= List of Turkish artists =

This is a list of notable Turkish artists.

== A ==
- Kuzgun Acar (1928-1976), sculptor
- Haluk Akakçe (born 1970), contemporary artist
- Onay Akbaş (born 1964), contemporary artist
- Ahmet Ziya Akbulut (1869–1938), painter
- Mehmet Aksoy (sculptor) (born 1939), sculptor
- Halil Altındere (born 1971), contemporary artist
- Hüseyin Bahri Alptekin (1957-2007), contemporary artist
- Avni Arbaş (1919–2003), painter
- Burak Arıkan (born 1976), contemporary artist
- Hale Asaf (1905–1938), painter
- Tomur Atagok (born 1939), painter and professor
- Ruzen Atakan (born 1966), Turkish-Cypriot painter

== B ==
- İbrahim Balaban (1921-2019), painter
- Bedri Baykam (born 1957), painter
- Turgut Berkes (1953-2018), rock musician, painter and writer
- Osman Hamdi Bey (1842–1910), painter, archaeologist and curator
- Sabiha Rüştü Bozcalı (1904–1998), visual artist and illustrator
- Fatma Bucak (born 1984), artist and photographer
- Erol Bulut (1955–2021), painter and professor

== C ==
- Taner Ceylan (born 1967), contemporary artist
- Hüseyin Çağlayan (born 1970), contemporary artist and fashion designer
- Sevgi Çağal (born 1957), painter and sculptor
- Nevin Çokay (1930–2012), painter
- Adnan Çoker (born 1927), painter
- Nusret Çolpan (1952–2008), painter, architect and miniature artist
- Antonio Cosentino (1970), painter, sculptor, contemporary artist
- Gürkan Coşkun (born 1941), painter also known as Komet

== D ==
- Şevket Dağ (1876–1944), painter
- Barış Dilaver (born 1975), ballet dancer, creator and filmmaker
- Abidin Dino (1913–1993), painter
- Burhan Doğançay (1929–2013), painter, photographer and former soccer player
- Ipek Duben (born 1941), contemporary visual artist

== E ==
- Nese Erdok (born 1940), painter
- Cevdet Erek (born 1974), contemporary artist and musician
- Ayşe Erkmen (born 1949), sculptor
- Bedri Rahmi Eyüboğlu (1913–1975), painter and poet

== F ==
- Ertuğrul Oğuz Fırat (1923–2014), painter, poet and composer

== G ==
- Leyla Gediz (born 1974), painter
- Bahadır Gökay (born 1955), painter and teacher
- Genco Gulan (born 1969), contemporary artist
- Bedia Güleryüz (1903–1991), painter
- Hatice Güleryüz (born 1968), contemporary artist
- Serkan Günes (born 1980), photographer
- Nazmi Ziya Güran (1881–1937), impressionist painter
- Mehmet Güreli (born 1949), writer, painter, director and musician

== H ==
- Haydar Hatemi (born 1945), painter and sculptor
- Emre Hüner (born 1977), contemporary artist

== İ ==
- Hülya Vurnal İkizgül (born 1966), mosaicist, sculptor and ceramic artist
- Erdal İnci (born 1983), new media artist
- Namık İsmail (1866–1902), painter

== K ==
- Müfide Kadri (1890–1912), painter
- Gülsün Karamustafa (born 1946), contemporary artist, filmmaker
- Ömer Ali Kazma (born 1971), contemporary artist
- Nur Koçak (born 1941), contemporary artist
- Servet Koçyiğit (born 1971), contemporary artist

== L ==
- Abdulcelil Levni (1680–1732), Ottoman court painter and miniaturist
- Hüseyin Avni Lifij (1886–1927), painter

== M ==
- Ali Miharbi (born 1976), contemporary artist

== O ==
- Ebru Özseçen (born 1971), contemporary artist
- Füsun Onur (born 1938), painter, sculptor
- Tankut Öktem (1940–2007), sculptor especially of monumental works
- Setenay Özbek (born 1961), artist
- Emre Ozdemir (born 1981) cartoonist
- Serkan Özkaya (born 1973), contemporary artist

== Ö ==
- Ahmet Öğüt (born 1981), contemporary artist

== P ==
- Ferik İbrahim Paşa (1815–1891), one of the first Western-style painters
- Halil Paşa (1857–1939), impressionist painter
- Hüseyin Zekai Paşa (1860–1919), painter
- Şeker Ahmet Paşa (1841–1907), painter of nature-related subjects
- Hayal Pozanti (born 1983), artist

== R ==
- Hoca Ali Riza (1858–1939), painter

== S ==
- Ibrahim Safi (1898–1983), impressionist painter
- Deniz Sağdıç (born 1982), painter
- Gizem Saka (born 1978), painter
- Fikret Mualla Saygı (1904–1967), avant-garde painter
- Muhittin Sebati (1901–1932), painter and sculptor
- Erinç Seymen (1980), painter
- Süleyman Seyyid (1842–1913), painter
- Kamil Sonad (born 1914), plaster sculptor, especially of female nudes
- Setenay Özbek (born 1961), painter and writer
- Fatih Sungurtekin (born 1977), painter, contemporary artist, conceptual artist

== T ==
- Hakan Topal (born 1972), contemporary artist
- Sali Turan (born 1949), modern painter
- Canan Tolon (born 1955), contemporary painter
- Yüksel Tamtekin (1930-2025), painter

== Y ==
- Nil Yalter (born 1938), contemporary artist
- Pınar Yolaçan (born 1981), photographer
- Metin Yurdanur (born 1951), sculptor

== Z ==
- Sarkis Zabunyan (born 1938), contemporary artist known as "Sarkis"
- Fahrelnissa Zeid (1901–1991), painter, collage and glass artist
