= List of Turkish women artists =

This is a list of women artists who were born in Turkey or whose artworks are closely associated with that country.

== A ==
- Hale Asaf (1905–1938), painter
- Tomur Atagok (born 1939), painter and professor
- Ruzen Atakan (born 1966), Turkish-Cypriot painter

== B ==
- Nezihe Bilgütay (Derler) (born 1926), miniaturist, Çini professional
- Fatma Bucak (born 1984), contemporary artist

== C ==
- Sevgi Çağal (born 1957), painter and sculptor
- Nevin Çokay (1930–2012), painter

== D ==
- Şükriye Dikmen (1918–2000), painter
- Ipek Duben (born 1941), contemporary visual artist

== E ==
- Nese Erdok (born 1940), painter

== G ==
- Leyla Gediz (born 1974), contemporary artist, based in Lisbon
- Bedia Güleryüz (1903–1991), painter
- Hatice Güleryüz (born 1968), contemporary artist
- Nilbar Gures (born 1977), contemporary artist, based in Vienna

== I ==
- Hülya Vurnal İkizgül (born 1966), mosaicist, sculptor, ceramist

== K ==
- Müfide Kadri (1890–1912), painter
- Nur Koçak (born 1941), contemporary artist
- Füreya Koral (1910–1997), ceramist

== M ==
- Melek Mazici (born 1956), painter based in Helsinki
- Şükran Moral (born 1962), contemporary artist, poet, critic based in Rome and Istanbul

== O ==
- Ayşe Ören (born 1980), architect, designer, sculptor
- Setenay Özbek (born 1961), artist

== P ==
- Hayal Pozanti (born 1983), artist

== S ==
- Gizem Saka (born 1978), painter
- Canan Şenol (born 1970), multidisciplinary visual artist

== T ==
- Hale Tenger (born 1960), contemporary artist
- Canan Tolon (born 1955), artist

== V ==
- Emel Vardar, contemporary sculptor and painter

== Y ==
- Nil Yalter (born 1938), contemporary artist
