= List of painters from Turkey =

This is a list of notable painters from, or associated with, Turkey.

== A ==
- Haluk Akakçe (born 1970)
- Ahmet Ziya Akbulut (1869-1938)
- Halil Altındere (born 1971)
- Avni Arbaş (1919-2003)
- Burak Arıkan (born 1976)
- Hale Asaf (1905-1938)
- Tomur Atagok (born 1939)
- Ruzen Atakan (born 1966)

== B ==
- İbrahim Balaban (1921-2019)
- Bedri Baykam (born 1957)
- Erol Bulut (1955-2021)

== C ==
- Taner Ceylan (born 1967)
- Sevgi Çağal (born 1957)
- Nevin Çokay (1930-2012)
- Adnan Çoker (born 1927)
- Nusret Çolpan (1952-2008)
- Gürkan Coşkun (born 1941)

== D ==
- Abidin Dino (1913-1993)
- Burhan Doğançay (1929-2013)

== E ==
- Nese Erdok (born 1940)
- Bedri Rahmi Eyüboğlu (1913-1975)

== F ==
- Ertuğrul Oğuz Fırat (1923–2014)

== G ==
- Bahadır Gökay (born 1955)
- Genco Gulan (born 1969)
- Hatice Güleryüz (born 1968)
- Nazmi Ziya Güran (1881-1937)
- Mehmet Güreli (born 1949)

== H ==
- Osman Hamdi Bey (1842-1910)
- Haydar Hatemi (born 1945)

== K ==
- Ömer Ali Kazma (born 1971)

== L ==
- Abdulcelil Levni (1680-1732)

== N ==
- Elif Naci (1898-1987)

== O ==
- Setenay Özbek (born 1961)

== P ==
- Halil Paşa (1857-1939)
- Hüseyin Zekai Paşa (1860-1919)
- Şeker Ahmet Paşa (1841-1907)

== R ==
- Hasan Rıza (1857−1913)
- Hoca Ali Riza (1858-1939)

== S ==
- Ibrahim Safi (1898-1983)
- Gizem Saka (born 1978)
- Fikret Mualla Saygı (1904-1967)
- Sarkis Zabunyan (born 1938)

== T ==
- Sali Turan (born 1949)

== See also ==
- A History of Modern Turkish painting
