= Turkish women in fine arts =

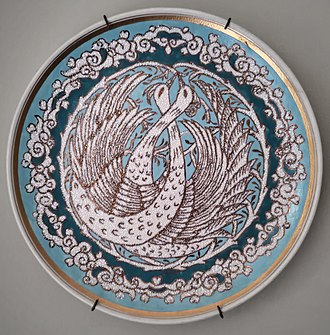
Nezihe Derler's painted Çini

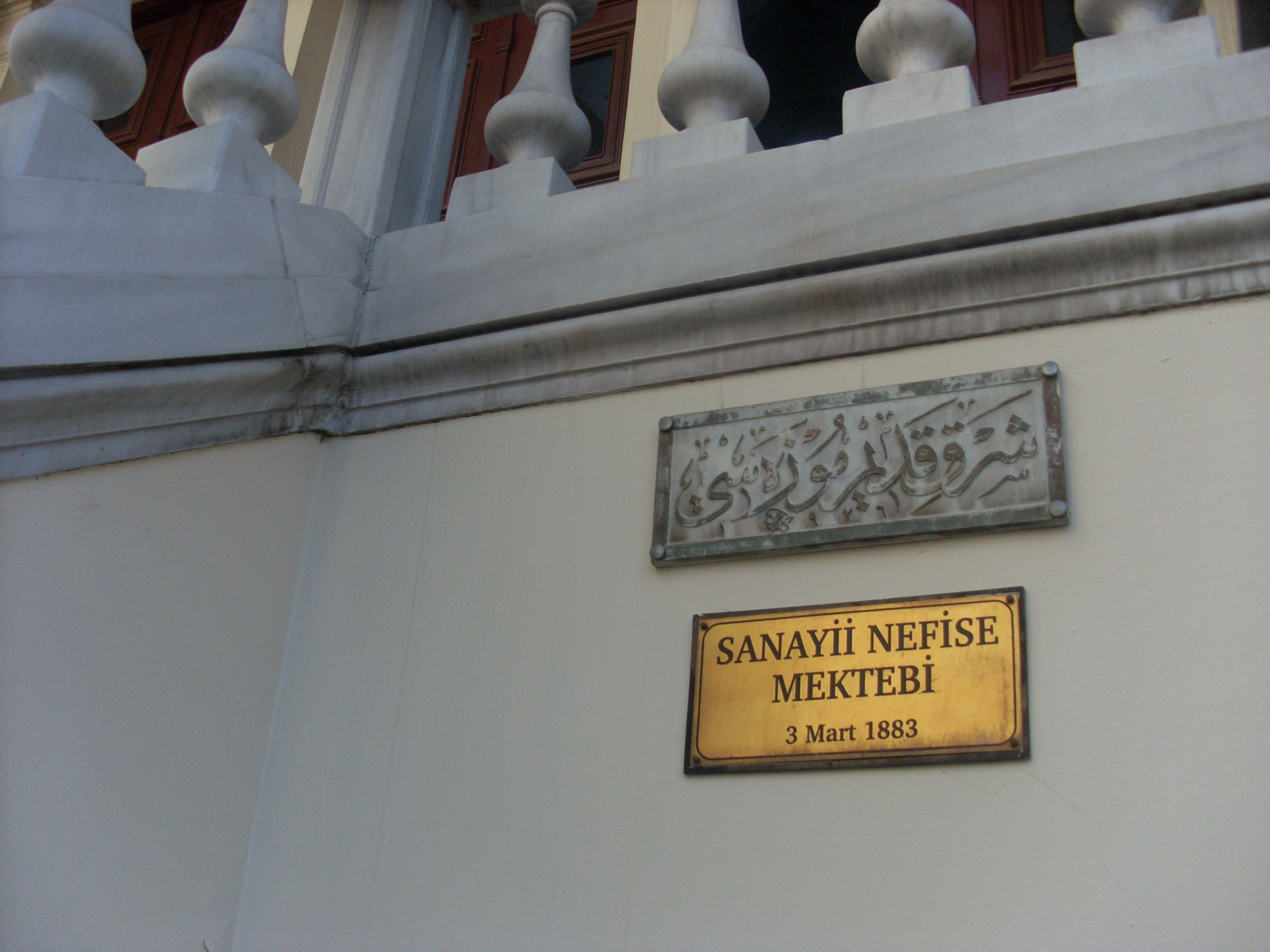
Sanayi-i Nefise

The first Turkish painters appeared no earlier than the mid-19th century during the Ottoman Empire era. (However, there were a few miniaturists before the 19th century.) The first art academy in Turkey was established in the 19th century but was meant only for male art students. Therefore, art remained gender-segregated until 1914, when an art school for women was established, but still, they could work under strict rules since working on nude models of the opposite sex was prohibited. The daughters of the enlightened people in Turkish society were allowed to participate in art privately, and they could not make it a career. Therefore, coming from such families, a girl child could get support from the family but only to practice art as a hobby and not as a profession. The portrayal of female artists in Turkey initially did not intend to show them as skilled people as their male counterparts could have been portrayed. It showed the female artists as people operating in the shadows of male artists and thus could not fit on the same continuum. The first Turkish woman painter was Müfide Kadri. (1889-1912) and the first Turkish woman sculptor was Sabiha Ziya Bengütaş. The first art academy for girls was Sanayi'i Nefise which became co-educational in 1914. During the Turkish Republic-era, art training was promoted by the government, and beginning in 1930 painting courses were added to the curriculum of the schools.

Women’s art in Turkey has thrived lately, and it has gained a lot of praise from women artists. In Turkey, women have taken a leading role in art not because they have been drawn or compelled to make art portraits but because of their individual and experimental attitude that has continued to thrive and made the women come up with artwork that defines the woman’s position in society. Schematic imagery is the tradition of Turkish art. Women have excelled in this art as they try to invent and experiment with new ideas that continue shaping Turkish fine arts. The most influential artist in Turkish art is Tomur Atagok, the most influential artist in Turkish art and particularly her work of the goddess. It is an essential piece of art that shows the power of women as she brings out different portrayals of women. Looking at this work, Atagok brings out a woman with protruding buttocks and large breasts to show the power of women in society. It shows the importance of the female body and brings out the identity of being a woman and the essential role of women in society.

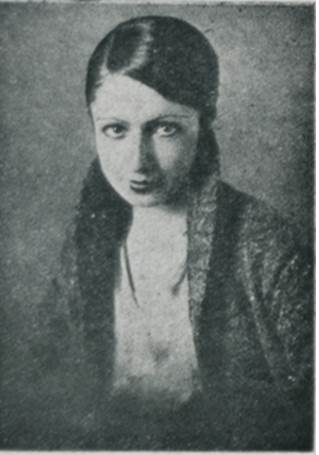
Hale Asaf

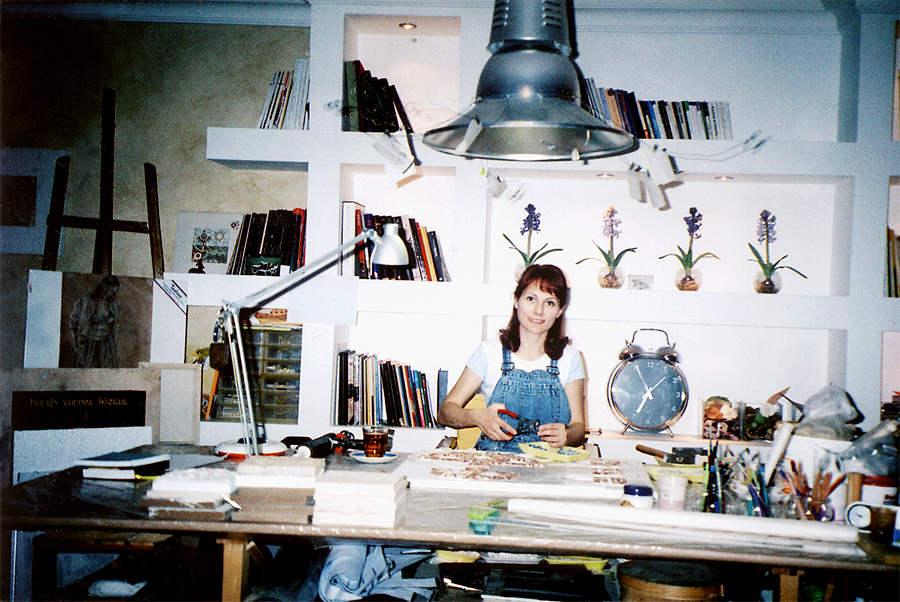
Hülya Vurnal İkizgül

== Painters ==
This is a list of female painters from Turkey, listed in alphabetical order by last name.

- Hale Asaf (1905-1938)
- Neşe Aybey (1930-2015)
- Zerzan Bengisu (1906-1978)
- Sabiha Bengütaş (1904-1992)
- Aliye Berger (1903-1974)
- Sevdiye Nilgün Acar (1958)
- Sevgi Çağal (1957)
- Nevin Çokay (1930-2012)
- Nazlı Ecevit (1900-1985)
- Neşe Erdok (1940)
- Hatice Güleryüz (1968)
- Nihal Güres (1962)
- Nilbar Güreş (1977)
- Hatice Kumbaracı Gürsöz (1945)
- Hülya Vurnal İkizgül (1967)
- Emel Korutürk (1915-2013)
- Mihri Müşfik (1886-1954)
- Hayal Pozanti (1983)
- Gizem Saka (1978) is a contemporary Turkish artist and an economist. She is a senior lecturer at the Wharton School of Business, University of Pennsylvania, and a visiting lecturer at Harvard University, teaching art markets.
- Nuran Tanrıverdi
- Funda İyce Tuncel (1968)
- Fahrunissa Zeid (1901-1991)
- Tomur Atagök (1939) is a feminist painter. She graduated with a B.F.A from Oklahoma State University.

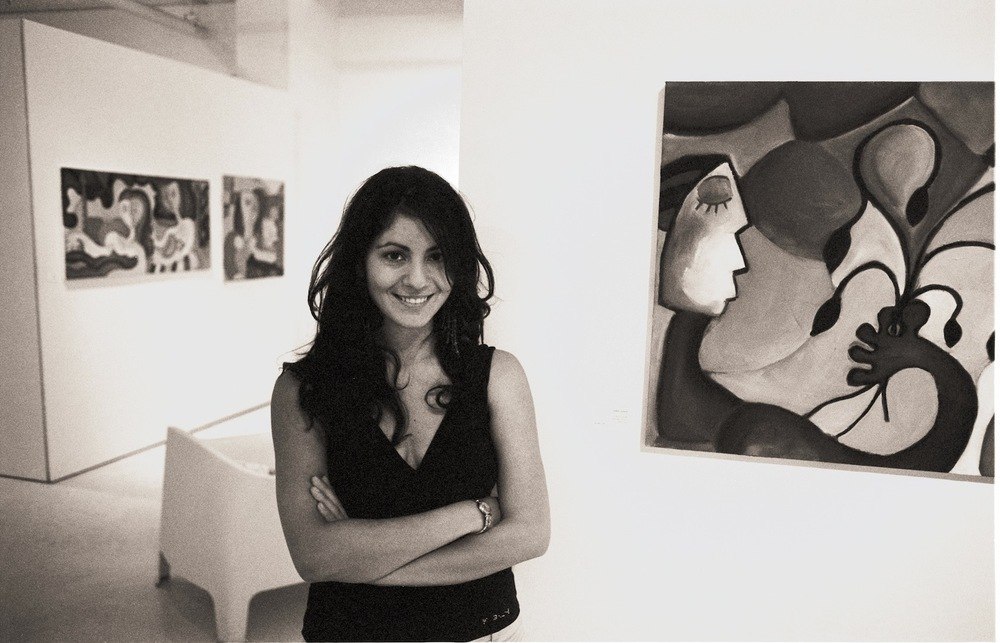
Gizem Saka

== Ceramicists ==
- Füreya Koral (1910–1997) was a pioneer ceramics artist in Turkey, known for her wall panels, but Koral worked in a variety of media such as tiles, statues, and plates, and also created household pieces.
- Jale Yılmabaşar (1939) painter and ceramicist.

== Multidisciplinary arts ==
This is a list of female artists from Turkey working within multiple art disciplines, and listed in alphabetical order by last name.

- Alev Demirkesen (1964) Miniature, Ceramics, Tezhip.
- Tomur Atagok (1939) painter, musicologist, author and professor.
- Nezihe Bilgütay (Derler) (1926) miniaturist, Çini professional.
- Gencay Kasapçı (1933 - 2017) painter who specialized in fresco, glass art and mosaic.
- Ayşe Ören (1980) architect, designer, sculptor and more, focused on the intersection between technology and art.
- Setenay Özbek (1961) writer, painter and filmmaker.
- Maryam Sahinyan (1911 - 1996) photographer, Turkey's first female studio photographer.
- Canan Tolon (1955) printmaking, painting, drawing, sculpture, and installation.

== See also ==
- Turkish art
- History of Modern Turkish painting
