= Hülya =

Hülya is a feminine Turkish given name. The name means "daydream" in Turkish.

== Etymology ==
It derived from the Arabic word "Khulya" (خوليا) meaning melancholia, from the Greek "(melan)xolía" (μελαγχολία) meaning "black bile".

== Given name ==
- Hülya Avşar (born 1963), Turkish actress
- Hülya Kat (born 1983), Dutch politician
- Hülya Koçyiğit (born 1947), Turkish actress
- Hülya Şahin (born 1974), Turkish female boxer
- Hülya Şenyurt (born 1973), Turkish female judoka
- Hülya Vurnal İkizgül (born 1966), Turkish mosaicist, sculptor and ceramic artist
