= Gencay Kasapçı =

Turkish artist (1933–2017)

- Born: 9 March 1933; Ankara, Turkey
- Died: 29 November 2017 (aged 84); Mersin, Turkey
- Known for: Glass art, mosaic, fresco
- Spouse: Abdullah Kasapçı
- Website: gencaykasapci.com

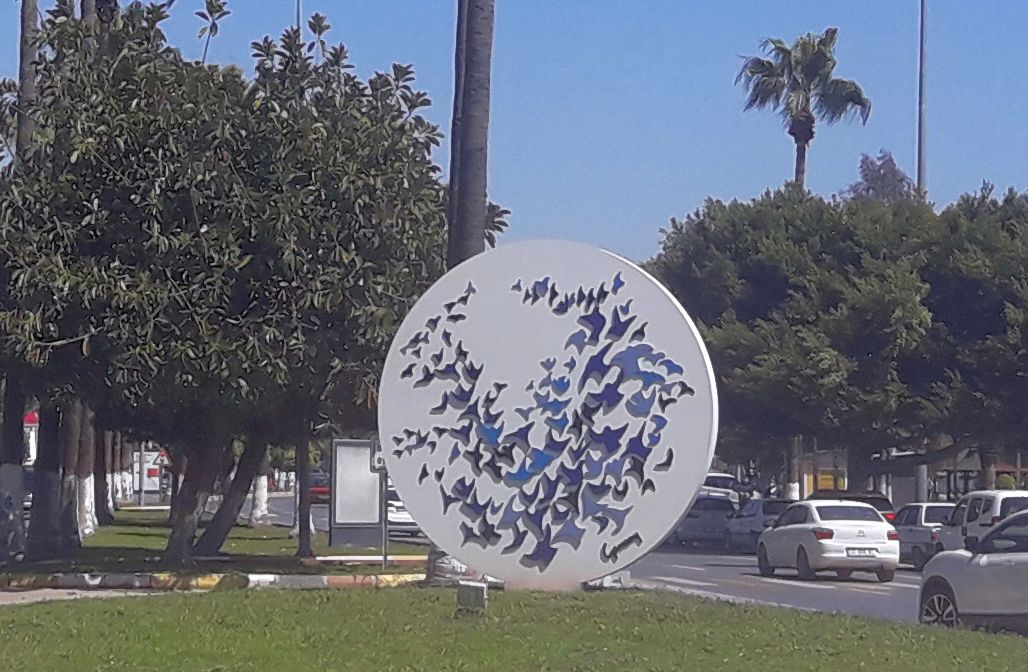
Freedom Monumentby Gencay Kasapçı in Mersin

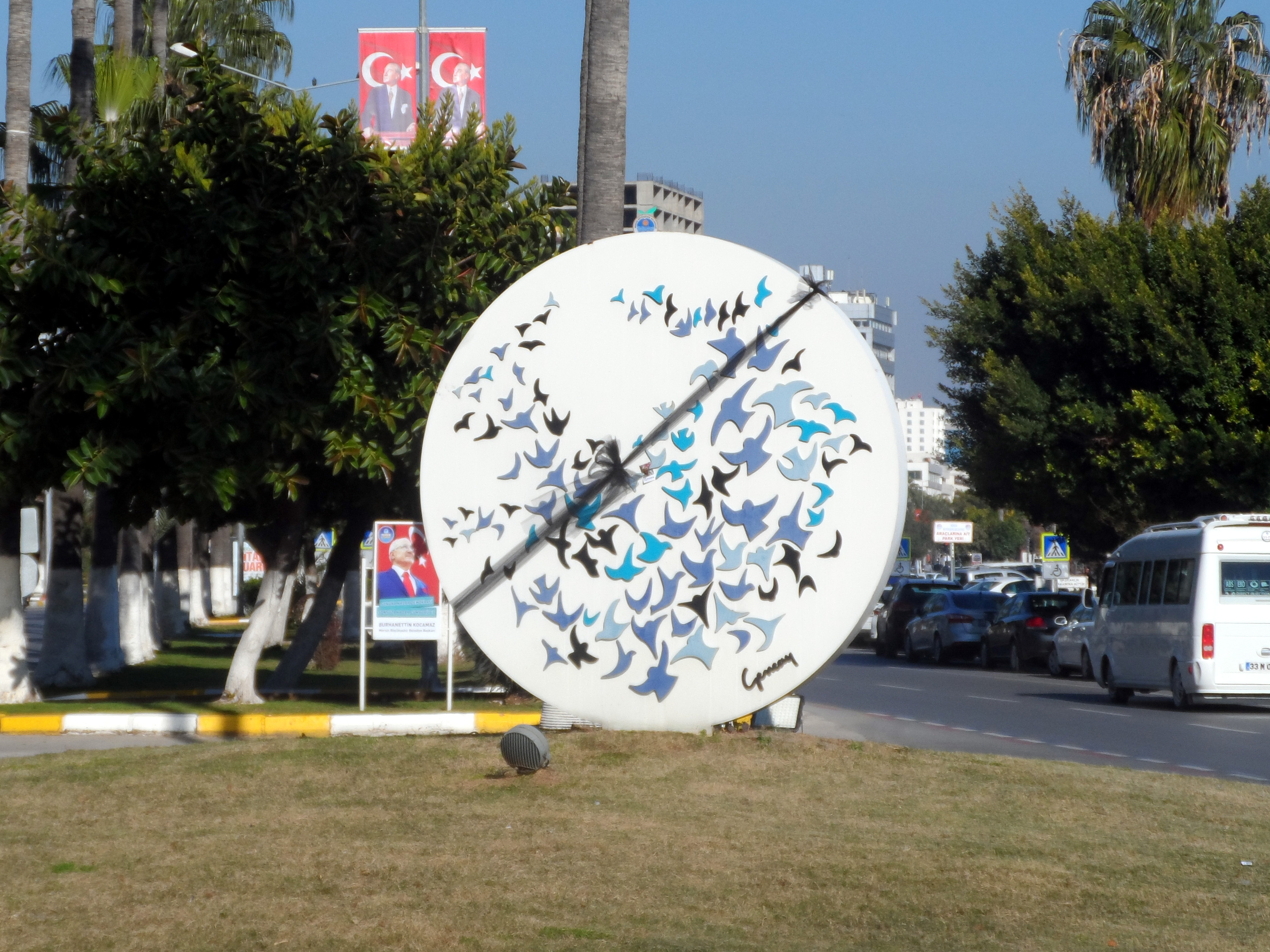
Freedom Monument by Gencay Kasapçı in Mersin (with black band after her death)

Gencay Kasapçı (9 March 1933 – 29 November 2017) was a Turkish painter who specialized in fresco, glass art and mosaic.

== Life ==
Gencay Ataseven was born to Vicdani Ataseven and Şaziment in Ankara, Turkey on 9 March 1933. After finishing primary and high school in Istanbul in 1950, she graduated from the Academy of Fine Arts (current Mimar Sinan University) in 1954.

She then returned to Ankara to study archaeology in 1957. Between 1959 and 1966 she lived and worked in Italy. In 1966 she returned back to Turkey. She married Abdullah Kasapçı, and later she settled in her husband's hometown Mersin. Gencay Kasapçı died in Mersin on 29 November 2017.

== Art ==
After winning a scholarship in 1959, she went to Italy and worked on fresco and mosaic under Prof. Collaccki in Florence. She stayed in Rome between 1960 and 1967, founding her own workshop. While in Italy, she illustrated some books for the publishers. In 1963, Kasapcı painted a mosaic wall of size 11 m^{2} (120 sq ft) for Ziraat Bank in Ankara. Some of her other artworks are ceramic murals in the Middle East Technical University faculty of Architecture, murals in Türkiye İş Bankası,'s headquarters in Ankara, Divan Hotel Ankara and Hotel Etap Marmara in Istanbul. Between 1976 and 1983, she was the art consultant and manager in "Vakko Art Gallery" in Ankara. In Mersin, Kasapcı designed and made the "Freedom Monument" in 1994 and "Orange Tree" statue in 1995. Between 1994 and 2000, she worked as an art consultant in the "Replica Art Gallery" in Istanbul. Her works can be seen in many collections both in Turkey and abroad. Some of her paintings were printed as cards by the TEMA Foundation, UNICEF and TAP. According to Hürriyet newspaper, she was the sole representative of the Zero art movement in Turkey.

== Achievements and awards ==
Kasapçı's awards are the following:

- 1960 International Gubbio Art Contest (2nd place)
- 1961 International Gubbio Ornament Contest (1st place)
- 1974 DYO Art Contest (1st place)
- 1980 "Award of Success" at Home Decoration Art Contest
- 1983 "Honorable Mention" at Vakko Art Contest
- 2003 "Award of Success" at 64th Art and Sculpture Contest by Ministry of Culture
- 2007 "Award of Profession" by Mersin Kızkalesi Rotary Club
- 2009 "Award of Profession" by Mersin Rotary Club
- 2011 Successful "Woman of the Year" Award by Mersin Soroptimist Club
- 2013 Mersin International Music Festival Art Award
- 2013 ÇAĞSAV Art Award
- 2013 "Respect to Master" Award by İzmir 5. International EgeArt
