= Canan Senol =

Turkish-Kurdish visual artist (born 1970)

- Canan Şenol
- Born: Canan Şahin; 1970 (age 55–56); Istanbul, Turkey
- Education: Marmara University
- Occupations: Visual artist, activist
- Website: www.cananxcanan.com

Canan Senol (Turkish: Canan Şenol; née Canan Şahin; born 1970), also known by the mononym Canan, is a Turkish multidisciplinary visual artist and activist, of Kurdish ethnicity. Her artwork addresses gender stereotypes, sexuality, and politics. She utilizes a variety of mediums in her practice including craft and digital techniques.

== Biography ==
Canan Şahin was born in 1970 in Turkey. She grew up in a rural part of Turkey. She studied at Marmara University, where she received a BA degree (1992) in business, and later studied painting at the same university.

She was married to a man with the name Şenol, however they divorced in 2010 and as an act of rebellion she continued to use his last name professionally which goes against local laws (sometimes uses her mononym).

Senol's artwork has been shown widely including, "Global Feminisms" (2007) group exhibition at the Brooklyn Museum in Brooklyn, New York.

Her work is held in public museum collections, including the Centre Pompidou, the Pinakothek der Moderne, the Davis Museum at Wellesley College, and Istanbul Modern.

== See also ==
- List of Turkish women artists
