= Ali Miharbi =

Turkish artist (born 1976)

- Born: 1976 (age 49–50); Istanbul, Turkey
- Education: Northwestern University, Chicago; Virginia Commonwealth University, Richmond, Virginia

Ali Miharbi (born 1976) is a Turkish kinetic and new media artist.

== Biography ==
He graduated from Northwestern University in the US, majoring in Electrical and Computer Engineering and Art Theory & Practice in 2000. In 2010, he completed his MFA in Kinetic Imaging at Virginia Commonwealth University. His work not only makes relationships about culture and technology visible, but also explores the modes of emotional and physical confinement that persist in the contemporary world. He creates graphic as well as sculptural work, including sound installations and dynamic systems driven by live or stored data and has been featured in exhibitions internationally, including in Turkey, the United States, Mexico, South Korea, Australia, Brazil, Germany, the Netherlands, Greece, and the United Kingdom.
