= Barış Dilaver =

Turkish ballet dancer and choreographer

- Born: December 2, 1975 (age 49); Istanbul, Turkey
- Occupation(s): Choreographer, Dancer, filmmaker

Barış Dilaver (born in Istanbul, Turkey in 1975) is a Turkish ballet dancer.

== Early life ==
Barış Dilaver was born on December 2, 1975, in Zeytinburnu, Istanbul. Initially aspiring to be a pianist while his twin sister aimed to become a ballerina, they both switched career paths after unsuccessful auditions. Dilaver's sister later became a successful singer in Turkey, whereas Dilaver pursued an international career as a ballet dancer.

At the age of 10, Dilaver started his dance training at the National Ballet School of Istanbul under Cem Ertekin. His early performances included roles in "Graduation Ball," and he later joined the Cagdas Ballet Company. By age 14, inspired by meeting dancer Nilay Yesiltepe, Dilaver secured sponsorships from Ardic Gursel and Nuray Atabay and auditioned in Germany, leading to further training at the John Cranko School in Stuttgart under Alex Ursuliak and Konstantin Rusau.

In 1994, Dilaver moved to Vienna at the invitation of Anne Wooliams, director of the State Opera Ballet, where he danced notable roles such as Puck in John Neumeier's "A Midsummer Night's Dream" and Mercutio in John Cranko's "Romeo and Juliet." He worked with esteemed choreographers Kenneth MacMillan, Renato Zanella, and William Forsythe, and was coached by ballet master Egon Madsen.

== Career ==
From 1993 to 2001, the prolific dancer performed in Germany, France, Ukraine, Hungary, Austria, Switzerland, Greece and his native Turkey. After this extensive touring, Baris decided to move from classical ballet to contemporary dance in order to widen his artistic horizons. In 2002, he choreographed a presentation for the Swarovski Crystal World, which took him to Germany and Austria. Soon after, he bought a video camera, started filming dancers, and became fascinated with multimedia as a means of expressing through his eye. He was soon to add another string to his artistic bow, when he started making films and documentaries for dance companies and opera houses and pursued two parallel careers – dance and filmmaking. He also founded his own film production company called db Dance Film.

In 2003, Baris created his first choreography at the Odeon Space in Vienna, which included other works by European choreographers and in which he performed in a short duet. He captured this event on film and produced Out There, A Play Through Time, which was later featured at the Vienna Short Film Festival. He went on to create over a dozen dance films and documentaries on dancers and dance venues, including the very first Black Dance Festival in Vienna, featuring performances by New York’s Opus Theater and the Dallas Ballet. He also filmed the International Impulse Dance Festival in Vienna, directed, choreographed and performed by Ismael Ivo (Mapplethorpe).

A few years earlier, Baris had seen Cirque du Soleil’s production Alegría in Vienna and immediately saw himself in one of the company’s shows. After contacting Cirque’s casting department in 2003, he was invited to Berlin a month later to audition for one of three coveted dance roles, and made the cut. He joined Cirque’s Dralion tour a year later.

In 2005, Baris danced in New Opera Vienna's production Seven Deadly Sins, which he captured on film, and later joined Cirque du Soleil’s innovative multimedia touring show Delirium, under the direction of American choreographer Mia Michaels. The show visited more than 150 cities across the United States, Canada, Mexico and Europe.

Baris Dilaver currently lives in Vienna, where he is pursuing his work as a choreographer and filmmaker.

== Later Life and Filmmaking ==
After a severe injury in 2007 ended his dancing career, Dilaver returned to Vienna. He produced and directed "Metamorphosis of Turk," a film exploring his identity and experiences as a Turkish artist in Europe. The film delves into the cultural and historical ties between Europe and Turkey, advocating for dialogue and understanding between diverse cultures.

== Dance education ==
- 1992–1994: John Cranko Schule, Stuttgart, Germany
- 1984–1989: Staatliche Ballettschule, Istanbul

Engagements

- 2005: Cirque du Soleil
- 2005: Neue Oper Wien
- 2004: Cirque Du Soleil
- 2004: Volksoper, Vienna
- 2002: Landestheatre, Linz
- 1999–2002: Volksoper, Vienna
- 1994–1997: Staatsoper, Vienna
- 1985–1989: Cagdas Ballett, Istanbul

Coaching/ Workshop:

- Vienna Volks Oper
- Tanz TheaterWien
- Move On Dance Center
- John Harris
- MQ Wien
- Video dance workshop
- Delirium Tour / Cirque du Soleil

== Filmography and documentaries ==
- Black Dance Festival
- Neue Oper Wien
- 7 Deadly Sins
- Ismael Ivo, Impulstanz (Mapplethorpe)
- Dallas Ballet
- Opus Theater New York
- Tanz Theater-Vienna (Fake Space)
- Joe Alegado (Smoke)
- Russell Adams
- NUD'EAU
- Air Pas de deux
- Donald Duck’s Sins
- Mask
- Out there a play through time ...
- Video dance workshop with Baris Dilaver
- Cirque du Soleil / Delirium - Through the eye of the Artist 1207

== Guest performance ==
- 2005 Cirque du Soleil
- 2004 Cirque du Soleil
- 2003 Odeon Theater
- 2002 Akropolis, Athen2002
- 2002 Landestheater, Linz
- 2001 Tanzsommer, Innsbruck
- 2001 Musical Theatre Basel
- 2001 Baden Baden
- 2001 Prinzregententheater, Munich
- 1998 Tanztheater Wien, Vienna
- 1998 Dance Festival Week Impuls, Vienna
- 1996 Budapest Opera House
- 1996 State Opera Kiew
- 1994 Conservatoire National Superieur de Musique, Lyon
- 1993 Rencontres International de la Dance, La Baule,
- 1993 International Dance Project, Bonn

== Notable Engagements ==
Cirque du Soleil (2004–2005) Neue Oper Wien (2005) Volksoper, Vienna (1999–2002) Landestheatre, Linz (2002) Cagdas Ballet, Istanbul (1985–1989) Filmography and Documentaries

Metamorphosis of Turk (Director and Producer) Multiple dance films and documentaries, including works on the Black Dance Festival and Impulse Dance Festival External Links
