= Sabiha Bengütaş =

Turkish sculptor (1904–1992)

Sabiha Ziya Bengütaş
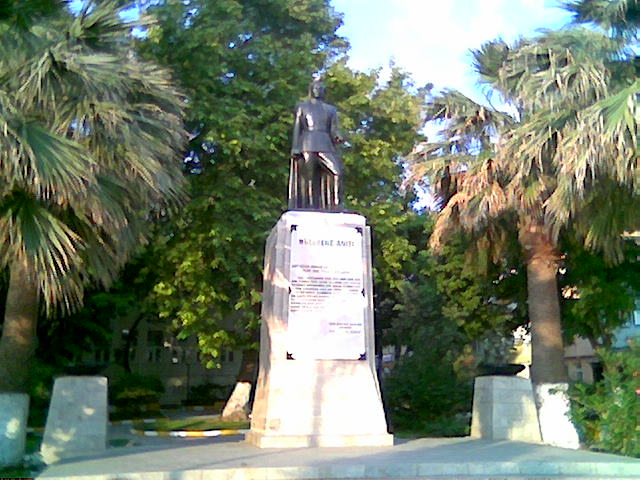
- Born: 1904; Istanbul, Ottoman Empire
- Died: 2 October 1992 (aged 87–88); Ankara, Turkey
- Known for: Sculpture
- Spouse: Şakir Emin Bengütaş

Sabiha Ziya Bengütaş (1904 – 2 October 1992) was a Turkish sculptor. She is the first woman sculptor of Turkey

== Life ==
Sabiha Ziya was born in Istanbul in 1904. She had a sister and an elder brother. She was schooled at Eyubsultan Numune School, now known as Eyüp Anatolian High School. She lived four years in Damascus, Syria (then a part of Ottoman Empire), where her father was assigned to due to his occupation. She continued her education there, attending a French Catholic school for one year. The family returned home and settled in Büyükada, where she completed her secondary education at Köprülü Fuat Pasha School. In 1920, he began studying fine arts in the Painting Department and the Sculpture Department of Istanbul Academy of Fine Arts (Ottoman Turkish: Sanayi-i Nefise Mektebi, current Mimar Sinan University). She was the first female student in the class. Feyhaman Duran was one of her teachers in the academy. In 1924, she won a state scholarship to study in the Academy of Fine Arts in Rome, Italy, where she was in the workshop of Ermenegildo Luppi (1877–1937).

In 1925, Bengütaş placed first in an examination held among sculpture students at the Academy of Fine Arts to select which student would be sent to study in Europe. However, because she was a woman, the position was instead given to the second-place finisher, Ratip Aşir Acudoğu. The following year, in 1926, she placed first in a separate examination held by the Taksim Monument Commission to select an assistant to be sent to work alongside Italian sculptor Pietro Canonica, who had been commissioned to create the Monument of the Republic in Taksim Square. A letter dated 21 March 1927, addressed to Canonica and held in the Osman Nuri Ergin archive, notes that Bengütaş had placed first in the examination, though it also raises her age as a consideration, as she was a 22-year-old woman at the time. She was ultimately sent to Italy and worked in Canonica's workshop for 18 months.

Later, she married Şakir Emin Bengütaş, a diplomat and the grandson of poet Abdülhak Hamit Tarhan. She often traveled abroad accompanying her husband. The couple settled at Maltepe neighborhood of Çankaya in Ankara after her spouse retired. She adopted a daughter named Nurol, who became company in her loneliness.

She died in Ankara on 2 October 1992.

== Art ==
In 1925, three busts by Sabiha Ziya were on display in an exposition at Galatasaray, Beyoğlu in Istanbul. The next year, her another three busts were exhibited in the exposition at the same place. Some of her sculptures are the busts of famous people such as poet Ahmet Haşim (1884?–1933), playwright and poet Abdülhak Hamit Tarhan (1852–1937), the first Muslim movie actress Bedia Muvahhit (1897–1994), general and statesman Ali Fuat Cebesoy (1882–1968), First Lady Mevhibe İnönü (1897–1992) and politician Hasan Ali Yücel (1897–1961).

In 1938, she won the first prize in two competitions for sculptures about Mustafa Kemal Atatürk (1881–1938), founder of modern Turkey, and İsmet İnönü (1884–1973), general and statesman. The statue of Atatürk was placed in the garden of former presidential palace of Çankaya Mansion and the statue of İnönü in Mudanya to commemorate the Armistice of Mudanya (1922). She was also the assistant of Pietro Canonica in the creation Monument of the Republic erected in Taksim Square, Istanbul in 1928.
