= Ebru Özseçen =

Turkish video artist (born 1971)

- Born: 1971 (age 54–55); İzmir, Turkey
- Website: https://ebruozsecen.net/

Ebru Özseçen (born 1971) is a contemporary Turkish artist whose work includes urban interventions, sculptures, photography, video and film installations, and drawings. Based in Europe, her practice often explores the psychological and sociological relationships between body and space, frequently incorporating elements of architecture and design.

== Early life and education ==
Born in İzmir, Turkey, Özseçen went to various schools to hone her craft as an artist. She graduated from the Interior Architecture and Environmental Design Department, School of Architecture, at Bilkent University in Ankara, Turkey, in 1994. Özseçen graduated from the same university with a master's degree from the Department of Fine Arts and the Institute of Economics and Social Sciences in 1996.

== Artwork and professional life ==
Özseçen is based in Europe.

Much of her work reflects her background in architecture, design, and contemporary art. Through this lens, Özseçen explores psychological and sociological aspects between space and the body in her art. Her work focuses on the dualities of life and society; examples include gender and public space. In her art, she also embraces fantasy and emptiness. Other work focuses on concepts such as time, perception, ratio, and measurements.

== Brief list of artwork ==
- Balls (1997): This is one of her earliest works. In this photograph, Özseçen displays glass balls and pendants on a chandelier. It was photographed in an antique store in London. These shapes are a theme that Özseçen comes back to throughout much of her work.
- Şerbet (1999–2010): A film depicting a stack of Burma baklava with syrup pouring off the sides in the form of a skyscraper. Şerbet, Turkish sugar water, is constantly circulated to keep the dessert wet. Özseçen displayed the film on a loop to signify eternal love.
- Glass Flowers (1999): Özseçen crafted a series of photographs designed to display the reproductive organs of a flower.
- Jawbreaker (2009): In this photograph, Özseçen snapped a shot the moment a candy ball was almost in the subject's mouth. She saw the mouth and the jawbreaker as one, a submissive fetish, where the jawbreaker must be removed from the mouth to allow for breathing.

== Exhibitions participated in ==
Ebru Özseçen has participated in these exhibitions:

- 1996 The Other, Findikli, Antrepo, Istanbul
- 1996 Deterritoralization, TÜYAP Tepebasi, Istanbul
- 1996 Dorm, Bilkent University Girl's Dorm, Ankara (solo)
- 1996 Kehanet, Bilkent University, Ankara
- 1996 You have the Midas touch, Macka Art Gallery, Istanbul
- 1997 The Big Blue, Coins, London
- 1997 Biennial of Young Artists of Europe and Mediterranean, Kapelitahdas, Helsinki
- 1997 Biennial of Young Artists of Europe and Mediterranean, Cavelerizza, Torino
- 1997 On life, beauty, translation and other difficulties..., The 5th Istanbul Biennial, Istanbul
- 1998 Open Ateliers, Rijksakademie, Amsterdam
- 1998 Scar, Netherlands Architecture Institute, Rotterdam
- 1998 Iskorpit, Haus der Kulturen der Welt, Berlin
- 1999 Iskorpit, Badischer Kunstverein, Karlsruhe
- 1999 17th World Wide Video Festival, Melkweg Cafe, Amsterdam
- 1999 Passion and Wave, The 6th International Istanbul Biennial, Istanbul
- 1999 Out of Nowhere, Artotek, Schidam/Leiden/ CBK, Dordrecht
- 1999 Arguments, Centre d'Art Contemporain, Geneve
- 2000 Friends and Neighbours, Limerick Biennial Ev+A, Limerick
- 2000 Arguments, Atatürk Cultural Center, Istanbul
- 2000 Springtime, Nikolaj Art Center, Copenhagen
- 2000 Strange Home, Kestner Museum, Hannover
- 2000 Das Lied von Der Erde, Museum Fridericianum, Kassel
- 2000 Ex Lux, Kunsthalle Tirol, Tirol
- 2000 Living The Island, Metropolitan Museum of Art, Busan
- 2000 City, Science and Technology Museum, Coimbra (solo)
- 2001 Les Interieur du Monde, Zaanstad Museum, Zaanstad
- 2001 Unlimited, nl-4, De Appel Foundation, Amsterdam
- 2001 The Big Blue, Tate Modern, London
- 2001 Locus Focus, Sonsbeek 9, Arnhem
- 2001 Graham, Özseçen, Trockel, Milchoff, Nürnberg
- 2001 Trans Sexual Express, Barcelona Triennale, Barcelona
- 2001 Regrets Reveries Changing Skies, Karsi Sanat, Istanbul
- 2001 Metropolis Now, Borusan Art Center, Istanbul
- 2001 Sugar Top Girl, Henry Urbach Architecture, New York (solo)
- 2002 Anniversary Show, Henry Urbach Architecture, NewYork
- 2002 Armory, Henry Urbach Architecture, New York
- 2002 Iconografias Metropolitanas, São Paulo Biennial, São Paulo
- 2002 Time: Nature, Galerie Tanya Rumpff, Haarlem
- 2002 Latent Space, Netherlands Architecture Institute, Rotterdam
- 2002 Time Light, Whistable Biennial, Whistable
- 2002 Metropolis Now, Reine Sofia Museum, Madrid
- 2002 Individual Geographies Global Maps, Nisantasi, Istanbul (public space)
- 2003 Shadows and Ghosts, Platform, Istanbul
- 2003 In den Schluchten des Balkan: Eine Reportage, Museum Fridericianum, Kassel
- 2004 Liste 04, Galerist, Basel
- 2004 Fading Lace, Plantage Kerklaan 30, Amsterdam (public space)
- 2004 Love it or Leave it, Vth Cetinje Biennial, Cetinje
- 2004 Les Points du Jour, Pont de Versailles, Paris (public space)
- 2005 o.T. [ City IV ], Galerie für Zeitgenössische Kunst, Leipzig
- 2006 Master Works of Media Art _ ZKM Collection, ZKM, Karlsruhe
- 2007 Inbetweeness, Ex Carceri del Complesso di San Michele a Ripa, Roma
- 2007 Modern and Beyond, Santral Istanbul, Istanbul
- 2007 Türkisch Delight, Städtische Galerie Backnang, Backnang
- 2007 Türkisch Delight, Städtische Galerie Nordhorn, Nordhorn
- 2007 Slow Space Fast Pace, Cork Art Trial, Cork (public space)
- 2008 Paradise Revealed : Reanimation of Place, The Pine's Garden St.Margaret's Bay, Kent (public space)
- 2008 Paradise Revealed : Reanimation of Place, The Charlton Shopping Centre Parking, Dover (public space)
- 2008 Old News 4, Midway Contemporary Art, Minneapolis
- 2008 Mahrem: Footnotes on Veiling, TANAS, Berlin
- 2008 Food For Thought, U-Turn Satellite Exhibitions, Stege Sukkerfabrik, Møn
- 2008 Who Killed The Painting?, Neues Museum, Nuernberg
- 2009 Embarkation, Town Centre Sign Boards, Dover (solo)
- 2009 Library Presentation, Dover Library, Dover Discovery Centre, Dover (solo)
- 2009 Who Killed The Painting?, Weserburg Museum Fuer Moderne Kunst, Bremen
- 2009 Coastal Currents, The Reading Room, 12 Claremont, Hastings
- 2009 Jawbreaker, Edition Block, Berlin (solo)
- 2010 Intriguing Pictures, Steinle Contemporary, Munich
- 2010 Starter, ARTER, Istanbul
- 2010 KISMET, TANAS, Berlin (solo)
- 2011 La Donna è Mobile, Maçka Modern, Istanbul
- 2011 Multipliziern ist Menschlich: 45 Jahre Edition Block 1966 – 2011, Edition Block, Berlin
- 2011 Art Beat Istanbul, Lütfi Kırdar Convention and Exhibition Centre, Istanbul
- 2011 Dream and Reality, Istanbul Modern, Istanbul
- 2011 Zwölf im Zwölften, TANAS, Berlin
- 2012 True Love Soul Mate, Rampa, Istanbul (solo)
- 2012 The Fertile Crescent, Mason Gross Galleries, New Brunswick, New Jersey
- 2014 Rainproof Ideas & More Editions, Edition Block, Berlin
- 2015 Challenging Identitites, Concordia, Enschede
- 2015 Symbiosis for Maxforum, Maxforum, Munich
- 2015 Histories and Stories, Neuer Berliner Kunstverein, Berlin
- 2017 Symbiosis, The Visual Science of Art, Humboldt University, School of Mind and Brain, Berlin
- 2019 Age of Gold , Galeri Nev, Ankara
- 2020 On Celestial Bodies, Arter, İstanbul
- 2022 This Play, Arter, İstanbul
- 2022 Beyoğlu in Purgatory, Chamber of Architecture, İstanbul
- 2023 Drei Hubwagen und ein Blatt Papier, Neues Museum, Nuernberg

== Collections housing artwork ==
- Collection Block, Møn/Berlin
- B.A.C.O.B. Collection, Brussels
- Rijksakademie, Amsterdam
- Science and Technology Museum, Coimbra
- Podesta Collection, Washington, D.C.
- Opymos Collection, Istanbul
- ZKM, Karlsruhe
- Vehbi Koç Contemporary Art Collection, Istanbul
