= Erol Bulut (painter) =

Turkish painter and professor (1955–2021)

- Self-portrait, 1992
- Born: 3 November 1955; İğneada, Turkey
- Died: 24 October 2021 (aged 65)
- Resting place: Zincirlikuyu Cemetery, Istanbul
- Education: State Academy of Fine Arts, now Mimar Sinan Fine Arts University (1981); Marmara University (proficiency in art, 1985)
- Known for: Painting
- Notable work: Dengenin Zorlanışı (1982); Cumhuriyet (1988); Bir Romantik Sanatçının Düşleri (1990); Düşler and Ham Meyveler series
- Spouse: Ümran Bulut
- Awards: Grand Prize, Tekel Painting Competition (1987); Special Jury Award, Grand National Assembly of Turkey (1988); First Prize, İstanbul'da Bir Kazlıçeşme Vardı (1989); First Prize, Ministry of Culture (1990)

Erol Bulut (3 November 1955 – 24 October 2021) was a Turkish painter and professor of painting at Marmara University in Istanbul, known for dreamlike figurative paintings that critics have associated with fantastic realism and surrealism. The art historian Tayfun Akkaya counted him among the important representatives of contemporary Turkish painting and credited him with bringing an innovation to contemporary painting through his "dream windows". His work, praised in the Turkish press for its original aesthetic approach, is the subject of three books: the critical study Erol Bulut ve Dünyası (Erol Bulut and His World, 2001), the monograph Erol Bulut (2024) and the memorial volume Bir Ömür Resim (A Lifetime of Painting, 2024).

By 2013 Bulut had held 23 solo exhibitions, including shows at the Ephesus Museum and the Antalya Museum, and his work was shown five times between 1983 and 1988 in the State Painting and Sculpture Exhibition, Turkey's leading national juried exhibition of the period. Between 1982 and 1994 he won eleven awards, among them prizes from the Grand National Assembly of Turkey, the Ministry of Culture and the state company Tekel, and first prize in a nationwide competition in 1989. His paintings are held in the collections of the Turkish parliament, the Ministry of Culture and Tourism and the Ephesus Museum, among others. Although he put artistic freedom ahead of self-promotion, several Turkish banks hosted solo exhibitions of his paintings and hold his works in their collections. Three years after his death, a memorial retrospective of 63 paintings from his Düşler (Dreams) and Ham Meyveler (Unripe Fruits) series was held in Istanbul and covered by The Art Newspaper Türkiye and the national press, including Cumhuriyet, Milliyet and Habertürk.

== Life and career ==
Bulut was born in İğneada in 1955. He graduated from the Painting Department of the Istanbul State Academy of Fine Arts, now Mimar Sinan Fine Arts University, in 1981, and in 1985 completed the sanatta yeterlik (proficiency in art), the doctoral-level degree in the Turkish fine arts system, at Marmara University. As a student he worked from 1977 to 1982 in the studio of the painter Dinçer Erimez; his fellow student Himmet Gümrah recalled that he produced some 500 drawings in two semesters.

In 1982 he joined the Department of Fine Arts Education at Marmara University's Atatürk Faculty of Education. He later chaired the department, and served as chair or member of juries for painting competitions, including the Tekel painting competition in 2002 and the painting competition of Istanbul's year as European Capital of Culture in 2010. During his military service in 1989–90 with the II Corps at Gelibolu, he produced paintings of the Gallipoli campaign, for which he received a commendation. He became an associate professor in 1995 and a full professor in 2001, and supervised more than thirty master's and doctoral theses in art education.

== Work ==
Bir Romantik Sanatçının Düşleri (Dreams of a Romantic Artist), 1990

From the 1980s onwards Bulut's paintings included two thematic series, Düşler (Dreams) and Ham Meyveler (Unripe Fruits). His Dengenin Zorlanışı (Balance Under Strain, 1982) received an honourable mention at the 16th DYO Painting Competition, a national competition held since 1967, and Taner Draman noted its "surrealist constructions and purified painterly technique". Other works discussed by critics include Cumhuriyet (Republic, 1988), one of the paintings on Atatürk and the history of the Republic for which Bulut was known, and Bir Romantik Sanatçının Düşleri (Dreams of a Romantic Artist, 1990).

By 2013 he had held 23 solo exhibitions, including shows at the Ephesus Museum in Selçuk and the Antalya Museum. He also took part in some ninety group exhibitions. Between 1983 and 1988 his work was shown five times in the State Painting and Sculpture Exhibition, the Ministry of Culture's national juried exhibition, which a 2017 study of the decade described as the most important art event of the period.

Bulut put artistic freedom ahead of popularity and awards. According to his former student Fatime Nuray Cengiz, free artistic production came before everything else in his studio, and the painter Mehmet Mahir described him as active in his artistic production but not in promoting himself. His work nonetheless found institutional support, notably from Turkish banks. İş Bankası, Akbank, Emlak Bankası, Garanti and Ziraat Bankası hosted solo exhibitions of his paintings in their art galleries, and İş Bankası, Ziraat Bankası and Akbank hold his works in their collections.

In 2013 he showed 70 paintings in Düşler ve Nü'ler (Dreams and Nudes) at the art gallery of the Caddebostan Cultural Centre in Istanbul, describing in his introduction a pursuit of dreamlike quality (düşsellik) in the relationship between figure and space.

== Critical reception ==
The art historian Tayfun Akkaya, author of a book-length study of Bulut's work, counted him "among the important representatives of contemporary Turkish painting". He credited Bulut with an innovation in contemporary painting through his "dream windows", created with "an entirely original creative power", described Dengenin Zorlanışı as a masterpiece and wrote that Bir Romantik Sanatçının Düşleri held an important place in contemporary Turkish painting. Noting that Bulut had generally been regarded as a fantastic realist with fantastic-surrealist tendencies, he argued that the paintings resisted classification under any single movement and described his approach as a contemporary neo-classicism with an aesthetic of international quality.

The art historian Ayla Ersoy called him "a metaphysical, fantastic or surrealist artist" who brought a new sensibility and perspective to the relationship between people and nature. The painter Mehmet Mahir wrote that Bulut's work long carried the influence of René Magritte's surrealist painting.

Coverage of his 2024 retrospective in The Art Newspaper Türkiye, the national press and Sanat Tasarım Gazetesi singled out his original aesthetic approach, his draughtsmanship and the "mysterious, mystical depth" of his paintings.

== Books on Bulut ==
In 2001 Sakarya University published Tayfun Akkaya's Çağdaş Resim Eleştirisinde Bir Metot Denemesi: Erol Bulut ve Dünyası (An Attempt at a Method in Contemporary Painting Criticism: Erol Bulut and His World), a 345-page illustrated study built around Bulut's painting. He also wrote the text accompanying Bulut's solo exhibition at the Ziraat Bankası Tünel Art Gallery in Istanbul, held from 30 December 2002 to 17 January 2003.

In August 2024 Paradigma Akademi published Erol Bulut, a 176-page monograph on the painter by Aylin Gürbüz and Görkem Utku Alparslan. Zeynep Öztürk's memorial book Bir Ömür Resim: Erol Bulut followed in November 2024 (see Legacy).

== Awards ==
Between 1982 and 1994 Bulut won eleven awards, three of them first prizes. In 1989 he won first prize in İstanbul'da Bir Kazlıçeşme Vardı (There Was Once a Kazlıçeşme in Istanbul), a nationwide painting competition held by the Bütün Zamanlar Art Gallery in Bakırköy on the theme of Kazlıçeşme. The jury, chaired by Dinçer Erimez, included Kemal Bilensoy, İsmail Tunalı and the painter Nevin Çokay.

Selected awards:

- 1982: Honourable mention, 16th DYO Painting Competition, for Dengenin Zorlanışı
- 1987: Grand Prize, Tekel Painting Competition
- 1988: Special Jury Award, National Sovereignty Painting Competition of the Grand National Assembly of Turkey
- 1989: First Prize, İstanbul'da Bir Kazlıçeşme Vardı, Bütün Zamanlar Art Gallery
- 1990: First Prize, Mevlana painting competition, Ministry of Culture

== Collections ==
Bulut's paintings are held in the collections of the Grand National Assembly of Turkey, the Ministry of Culture and Tourism, the Ephesus Museum, Tekel, Ziraat Bankası, Türkiye İş Bankası and Akbank, as well as in private collections.

== Selected exhibitions ==
Solo exhibitions

- 1982: Erenköy İş Sanat Gallery, Istanbul
- 1983: Akbank Art Gallery, Istanbul
- 1984: Konak İş Sanat Gallery, İzmir
- 1985: Turkuaz Art Gallery, Ankara
- 1986: Ephesus Museum, Selçuk
- 1996: Emlak Bankası Art Gallery, Istanbul
- 1998: Garanti Art Gallery, Istanbul
- 1998: State Fine Arts Gallery, Istanbul
- 2000: Vakko Art Gallery, Istanbul
- 2001: Antalya Museum, Antalya
- 2002–03 and 2007: Ziraat Bankası Tünel Art Gallery, Istanbul
- 2013: Düşler ve Nü'ler, Caddebostan Cultural Centre, Istanbul
- 2024: Bir Ömür Resim (memorial retrospective), DG Art Project, Istanbul

Group exhibitions

- 1982: 16th DYO Painting Competition exhibition
- 1983, 1984, 1985, 1986 and 1988: State Painting and Sculpture Exhibition
- 1983: International Mersin Festival painting exhibition, Mersin
- 1986 and 1988: National Sovereignty painting competition exhibitions, Grand National Assembly of Turkey
- 1988–1995: Tekel painting competition exhibitions
- 2016: Academic staff exhibition, Grand National Assembly of Turkey Dolmabahçe Art Gallery, Istanbul
- 2017: Zaman – Siz, Varna, Bulgaria

== Legacy ==
Şahit Melekler (Witness Angels), 2020, one of his last paintings

After his death, the academic Zeynep Öztürk spent a year preparing a memorial book, Bir Ömür Resim: Erol Bulut (A Lifetime of Painting: Erol Bulut). It examines his paintings, his life and his years at the faculty, and collects recollections by his wife, friends and students. The book was launched with a retrospective curated by Öztürk at Galeri DG Art Project in Istanbul, which opened on 30 November 2024 with 63 of his paintings. His former student, the painter and art educator Fatime Nuray Cengiz, wrote that his approach to art left a deep mark on the students he trained.

His prize-winning 1989 painting and its award plaque, now in the Ümran Bulut Collection, are reproduced in the catalogue of Kazlıçeşme'nin Altı Asırlık Hafızası (Six Centuries of Kazlıçeşme's Memory), an exhibition on the history of the district that opened at Kazlıçeşme Sanat in Zeytinburnu, Istanbul, in November 2026.

Artists and guests at the memorial exhibition Bir Ömür Resim at DG Art Project, Istanbul, 2024

== Personal life ==
Bulut was married to Ümran Bulut, who also taught in the Department of Fine Arts Education at Marmara University. He died in 2021 and is buried in Zincirlikuyu Cemetery in Istanbul.
