= Bahadır Gökay =

Turkish painter (born 1955)

Bahadır Gökay (born 1955 in Istanbul) is a Turkish painter. He graduated from the Department of Graphics in the State School of Higher Education of Applied Fine Arts Istanbul (now known as Marmara University, Graphic Design) in 1982. He was yet a student when he started working as an art director in distinguished advertising companies. He established his own company in 1984 and became the creative director of many significant brands.

In addition to his 13 solo exhibitions in Turkey, Greece and Kosovo, he also exhibited his work in Florence Biennale (Italy, 2005), The Biennial of Contemporary Art 'De Nittis' (Italy, 2007), VI. International Biennial of Drawing Plzeň and received The Honorary Certificate of the Highest Quality (Czech Republic, 2008), 1. Biennale d'Arte Moderna (Italy, 2008) and has participated in many group exhibitions in Turkey, Argentina, Greece and Germany. He has earned numerous awards in various competitions.

He is also one of the Turkey representatives of the International Association of Art (AIAP/IAA) which is in operational relationship with UNESCO.

He has established Erenus Art Gallery in Istanbul in 2001 and opened the gallery's Ankara branch in 2008. He continues working in his Atelier in Istanbul and also teaches drawing and painting at Erenus Art Gallery.

The recent biennials he took part in are:

- 2011 – 1st International Izmir Biennial of Arts (Grand Jury Prize)
- 2010 – 15th International Drawing Biennial Kosovo
