= Sali Turan =

Turkish painter (born 1949)

Sali Turan (born 1949, Trabzon) is a Turkish painter. He lives in Istanbul, Turkey.

== Biography ==
He studied painting at Atatürk Educational Institute, Istanbul 1970–74. He studied for his master's degree in painting at Istanbul State Academy of Fine Art 1976–81. From 1978 to 1986 he was a lecturer at Marmara University in Istanbul, Uludağ University in Bursa and Anadolu University in Eskişehir. He received his Doctorate in 1984. He became an associate professor in 1985 and in 1986 he resigned from the University and devoted himself to painting.

- 1994 Daniel Ferguson (a friend of Francis Bacon and author of his biography) suggested opening an exhibition in a gallery of his choice in London (100 paintings)
- 1996–2001 Study and working tour of Europe and the United States

=== Awards ===
- 1974 March prize at the Istanbul IAEE Exhibition.
- 1974 Inter-Studio prize at the Istanbul IAEE Exhibition
- 1978 Kartal Festival Achievement Award
- 1981 Ranked first in the Teaching Examination for Institutions of Higher Education
- 1988 Tekel Competition prize

== Selected exhibitions ==
- 2007 Gallery Akademist, Izmir
- 2006 Contemporary Istanbul, Kanat Bayazıt Art Gallery
- 2006 AKM Art Gallery, Istanbul
- 2005 Modern Art Gallery, Istanbul
- 2004 Hobi Art Gallery, Istanbul
- 2003 Antik Gallery, Istanbul
- 2001 National Arts Club Grand Gallery, New York
- 2001 Washington National Building Museum
- 2000 Atatürk Cultural Center Art Gallery, Istanbul
- 1998 Atelye Ulus, Istanbul
- 1994 Tüyap, Istanbul
- 1993 Kile Art Gallery, Istanbul
- 1990 Kile Art Gallery, Istanbul
- 1987 Sanat Yapım Gallery, Ankara
- 1986 Turban Hotel, Çeşme
- 1986 Kale Art Gallery, Bodrum
- 1982 Akbank Art Gallery, Bursa
- 1974 IAEE Exhibition, Istanbul
