= Ertuğrul Oğuz Fırat =

Turkish composer, painter, poet

- Born: 1 February 1923; Malatya, Turkey
- Died: 16 October 2014 (aged 91); Ankara
- Occupations: Composer, painter, poet

Ertuğrul Oğuz Fırat (1 February 1923 in Malatya – 16 October 2014 in Ankara) was a Turkish composer, painter and poet.

Fırat graduated from Istanbul University with a degree in law in 1948 and held a career as a judge until his retirement in 1979.

All through his life, Fırat was involved in the arts: music, writing, painting. He began to compose music and write his first poems and stories in the early 1940s, and took up painting in 1960.

== Selected works ==
Several Fırat scores are published by Seesaw Music.

Stage

- Cambot Ardışı, Ballet Suite for chamber ensemble, Op. 7 (1956)
- Anadolu'da Çırakman Ateşleri, Ballet Suite No. 1 for orchestra, Op. 41 (1970–1975)
- Anadolu'da Çırakman Ateşleri, Ballet Suite No. 2 for mixed chorus and orchestra, Op. 47 (1979)
- Gerçek Simge Oyun (Reality, Symbol, Genre), Multimedia Ballet for narrator, chorus, instrumental ensemble (flute, 2 cellos, 2 pianos), and dancers, Op. 53 (1977–1978)

Orchestra

- Orkestra Konçertosu No. 1 (Concerto for Orchestra No. 1), Op. 16 (1962–1963)
- Anısal Kaynaklar No. 1 (Memorial Sources No. 1), Concerto Grosso, Op. 19 (1964)
- Üç Dans (3 Dances), Op. 20 (1947–1965, revised 1986)
- Karpuz Yiyen Eşek, Op. 21 (1965, revised 1976)
- Ve Sana Işığı Sorarlar for ensemble of winds and percussion, Op. 40 (1969)
- Büyülü ve Susuz Arayışlar, Orkestra Konçertosu No. 2 (Concerto for Orchestra No. 2), Version I, Op. 45 (1968–1973)
- Atatürk Savaşta ve Barışta (Atatürk in War and Peace) for chamber orchestra, Op. 49 (1973); original version for piano solo, Op. 30
- Türkiye (Turkey), 9 Pieces, Op. 51 (1976–1977)
- Küğ (Music) for harpsichord or piano and string orchestra, Op. 52 (1978)
- Büyülü ve Susuz Arayışlar, Orkestra Konçertosu No. 2 (Concerto for Orchestra No. 2), Version II, Op. 57 (1979–1980); revision of Op. 45
- Anısal Kaynaklar No. 2 (Memorial Sources No. 2), Op. 69 (1982)

Concertante

- Diriliş (Revival) for cello and orchestra, Op. 8 (1956, revised 1979)
- Ölümsüz Olana Ağıt, Concerto No. 1 for violin and orchestra, Op. 27 (1965–1967)
- Kaynak Sonunu Bekliyordu, Concerto No. 1 for viola and orchestra, Op. 28 (1967, revised 1975)
- Çoğul Yalnızlık, Concerto No. 2 for violin and orchestra, Op. 34 (1968, revised 1983)
- Kanıtsız Günlerin Oldusu (A Vision of Days Past), Concerto No. 2 for viola and orchestra, Op. 35 (1968)
- Uygar Çığlıklarla (With Civilized Cries; Avec des crís civilisés), Concerto for bassoon and chamber orchestra, Op. 39 (1968–1969)
- Yitmiş Işık Çizgisi Ardından, Uyanış, Atatürk'ün anısına (Upheaval following a Lost Ray of Light), Concerto No. 1 in Commemoration of Atatürk for piano and orchestra, Op. 46 (1969–1972)
- Bir Sevinin Devingen Dirim Düzeni, Concerto for organ and orchestra, Op. 54 (1971–1978)
- Korkaklığa, Sessizliğe ve Ölüme Karşı Yanıtdır, Concerto No. 2 for piano and orchestra, Op. 56 (1979)
- Yivcil Morun Seslenişi (Crís du violet en spiral), Concerto for clarinet and orchestra, Op. 58 (1980); original version for clarinet and piano, Op. 24 (1966, revised 1971)
- Uzak ve Yakın Çağrılar, Concerto for trumpet and orchestra, Op. 59 (1980)
- Dönüşümler, Triple Concerto for oboe, clarinet, bassoon and orchestra, Op. 62 (1980)
- Anadolu Mayası (Leaven of Anatolia), Symphony Concertante for bass clarinet and orchestra, Op. 72 (1984); original version for clarinet and piano, Op. 17 (1963, revised 1981); revised in 1988 as Op. 80
- 1+2+3+4…Sonsuz, Concerto No.3 for violin and orchestra, Op. 73 (1984)
- Anadolu Mayası, Symphony Concertante for bass clarinet, cello and orchestra, Op. 80 (1988); original version for clarinet and piano, Op. 17
- Sevi Çığlıklarıyla Geçiyor for harpsichord and orchestra, Op. 82 (1991–1992)
- Coşku Basamakları, Triple Concerto for clarinet, bassoon, tuba and orchestra, Op. 94 (2001–2002)

Chamber music

- String Quartet No. 1 in F, Op. 1 (1945–1951)
- Trio No. 1 for violin, cello and piano, Op. 2 (1950–1951)
- Üçlü Sonat (Trio Sonata), Trio No. 2 for violin, clarinet and piano, Op. 2 (1953–1954)
- Eğlenceler (Amusements), 3 Short Pieces for clarinet and piano, Op. 4 (1954–1955)
- String Quartet No. 2, Op. 9 (1948–1950)
- String Quartet No. 3, Op. 10 (1954–1957); dedicated to Béla Bartók
- Sonatçık (Petite Sonata) for viola and piano, Op. 11 (1957–1958)
- Küçük Parçalar (Short Pieces) for viola and piano, Op. 12 (1956–1958)
- Devrimci Ortamda Sazların Cumhuriyeti, Trio No. 3 for flute, violin and piano), Op. 15 (1961, revised 1977)
- Anadolu Mayası for clarinet and piano, Op. 17 (1963, revised 1981); revised in 1984 for bass clarinet and orchestra, Op. 72
- Yivcil Morun Seslenişi (Crís du violet en spiral), Duo for clarinet (or violin) and piano, Op. 24 (1966, revised 1971); revised in 1980 for clarinet and orchestra, Op. 58
- Güneş Yaprakları, 9 Interconnected Pieces for cello and piano, Op. 26 (1967)
- Yokluk Evreninde Dönüşüm for violin and piano, Op. 29 (1966, revised 1968)
- Usançsız Tasarlama, 3 Pieces for cello and piano, Op. 31 (1967–1968)
- Ezgiler (Melodies), 4 Pieces for violin and piano, Op. 32 (1954–1968)
- Acı Gölgelerin Rastlantısında (In Coincidence of Sorrowful Shadows) for violin and piano, Op. 33 (1968, revised 1983)
- String Quartet No. 5, Op. 42 (1971, revised 1977); dedicated to Karol Szymanowski
- 1+2+3+4…Sonsuz, String Quartet No. 6, Op. 44 (1971, revised 1978)
- Anadolu Güneşleri (Anatolian Suns), 3 Movements for oboe and piano, Op. 48 (1963–1973)
- Tohum ve Kıvılcımlar for wind quintet, Op. 60 (1980)
- Uyumsuzluğun Uyum Odakları for flute, oboe, clarinet, bassoon, Op. 63 (1981)
- Süreklilik ve Orantı for solo bassoon, clarinet, trombone, glockenspiel, xylophone, viola, and organ or piano, Op. 65 (1981)
- Tükenmezlik Ardında, Quartet for 2 clarinets, bassoon and harp (or piano), Op. 66 (1981)
- Nice Seslerden Sonra for double bass and piano, Op. 68 (1982)
- Yivcil Morun Seslenişi (Crís du violet en spiral), Version III for flute (or violin or clarinet) and piano, Op. 74 (1984)
- Bağımsız Çığırgılar Ardışı, Trio No. 5 for clarinet, viola and piano, Op. 75 (1985)
- Göm Alkışlarını Geçmişin, Trio No. 6 for violin, cello and piano, Op. 76 (1985)
- Ağıtsal Dördül, String Quartet No. 7, Op. 78 (1986)
- Kalabalık Beyin Sormakla Çoğalmış for flute (or violin) and organ (or piano, cello and double bass), Op. 83 (1991–1992)
- Azalan Işıkta, Karmakarışık, String Quartet No. 8, Op. 85 (1995)
- Kemancı Ustanın Büyü Kırını (The Master Violinist's Magic Dance) for violin solo, Op. 88 (1997–1999)
- Irkılın Büyü Kırını for violin, horn, harpsichord and organ, Op. 89 (1999)

Keyboard

- İki Piyano için Küğ (Music) for 2 pianos, Op. 22 (1965)
- Atatürk Savaşta ve Barışta (Atatürk in War and Peace) for piano, Op. 30 (1961–1968); also orchestrated as Op. 49
- Yerel Ezgiler Üzerine İmgesel Danslar, 6 Pieces for piano, Op. 36 (1964–1969, revised 1983)
- Bölünmüş Uzantı, 2 Movements for piano, Op. 37 (1968–1969)
- Bağımsızlık Tutkusuna Sonat (Passion of Independence), Sonata for piano, Op. 38 (1969)
- Piyano İçin Üç Parça (3 Pieces for Piano), Op. 50 (1970–1978, revised 1985)
- Değişmeye Artık Zaman Kalmadı, 3 Meditations for organ, Op. 70 (1982)
- Franz Liszt'i Anış for piano and added equipment, Op. 77 (1986)
- Cehennemde Bir Mevsim Çalınmalıdır for piano, Op. 79 (1986)
- Karanlığın İçyüzüne Dört Bakış, Sonata for piano, Op. 84 (1994)
- Piyano İçin Altı Bölüm (6 Movements for Piano), Op. 86 (1996–1997)
- Çembalo için Deneysel İki Parça (2 Experimental Pieces) for harpsichord, Op. 87 (1997–1999)
- Küğdeki Resimler (Pictures on Music), Series I, 5 Movements for piano, Op. 91 (2000–2001)
- Küğdeki Resimler (Pictures on Music), Series II, 5 Movements for piano, Op. 92 (2001)
- Özgürlük Direnci, 3 Pieces for harpsichord, Op. 93 (2001)

Vocal

- Zamanın Örümceği for soprano and orchestra, Op. 6 (1955, revised 1978)
- Ir ve Çalgılar için Küğ (Music for Voice and Instruments), Op. 13 (1957, revised 1961)
- Irsal Dördül (Vocal Quartet), String Quartet No. 4 for voice and string quartet, Op. 14 (1957, revised 1961)
- Umursanmamış (The Uncaring), Trio No. 4 for alto, violin, clarinet and piano, Op. 25 (1966, revised 1977)
- Bağımsız Şarkılar (Independent Songs), 5 Songs for bass and piano, Op. 18 (1963)
- İneğe Övgü for voice and small ensemble, Op. 23 (1965)
- Ölümlerde Çöl-Çığlık for two voices and orchestra, Op. 55 (1979)
- Dranas'ın Yırı üzerine Şarkı for baritone and ensemble, Op. 61 (1980)

Choral

- Şangırtı, Symphony No. 1 for soprano, tenor, mixed chorus and orchestra, Op. 5 (1955, revised 1978)
- Irsal Senfoni No. 2 (Vocal Symphony No. 2) for a cappella chorus, Op. 43 (1970, revised 1978)
- Atatürk (Version I), Oratorio (Symphony No. 3) for speaker, soloists, mixed chorus and orchestra, Op. 64 (1970–1981)
- Türkiye (Turkey), 6 Local Songs for chorus and ensemble, Op. 67 (1982)
- Atatürk (Version II), Oratorio for speaker, soloists, mixed chorus and orchestra, Op. 71 (1983–1984)
- Germencik Çığırgıları, 9 Pieces for a cappella children or youth chorus, Op. 81 (1989)
- Eşliksiz Koro için Çığırgılar for a cappella chorus, Op. 90 (1999–2000)

Literary works

- Karmakarışık Öyküler Kitabı (Tangled Stories), Metis Yayınları, 1995.
- Seviçıra: Şiirler / Yırlar (1943–1992), Doruk, 1997.
- Çağdaş Küğ Tarihi İçin İmler I (Remarks on the History of Modern Music I), Yapı Kredi Kültür Sanat Yayıncılık, 1999.
- Ertuğrul Oğuz Fırat: Retrospektif, Yapı Kredi Kültür Sanat Yayıncılık, 1999.
- Umursanmamış: 1951–1999 yazılar, Pan Yayıncılık, 1999.
- Yılların Bitimsiz Gücü: Şiir, Akar Ofset, 2001.
