= Nur Koçak =

Turkish artist (born 1941)

Nur Koçak is a contemporary feminist Turkish artist who was born in Istanbul, Turkey in 1941. She is most well known for her works that comment on women's objectification in consumerist societies. She lives and works in Istanbul, Turkey.

== Education ==
Koçak attended TED Ankara College where she learned painting from Turgut Zaim. She continued her high school education in Washington DC, and was taught by the abstract-expressionist Leon Berkowitz. In 1960, she returned to Istanbul, where she studied under Adnan Çöker, Cemal Tollu and Neşet Günal in the Painting Department of the Istanbul Academy of Fine Arts. In 1970, she came first in the National Ministry of Education examinations and was sent to Paris on a scholarship to study painting at École des Beaux-Arts in the studio of Jean Bertholle. In 1974 Koçak returned to Istanbul and began teaching at the Istanbul State Academy of Fine Arts between 1975 and 1981.

== Works ==
While in Paris, she was influenced by the Situationists and their critique of consumerism. After studying French advertisements and their representation of the female body, she became particularly interested in the photo-realism movement and created her first series of paintings entitled Fetishist Objects/Woman as an Object to explore how mass media uses fetish objects and objectifies female images. She further developed her style in a following series, Pictures of Happiness, where she moved from painting and began to use recycled images into art pieces. She continued this theme in Family Album, a series that uses found images from her own past. Another change was "Vitrines," a series consisting of images of herself in the context of how women's bodies and images are displayed on commercial vitrines in 1980s Istanbul.

== Exhibitions ==
Nur Koçak participated at the International Triennial of Plastic Arts Belgrade in 1979 and the International Drawing Biennial Lisbon in 1979 and 1981. Her work was included in the Made in Turkey: Artists' Positions 1978-2008 Exhibition at the Ernst Barlach Museum in Wedel and the Drostei Museum in Pinneberg, Germany. Koçak has had 13 solo exhibitions and participated in group exhibitions in Turkey and abroad.

Koçak's work was included in the 2012 exhibition Dream and Reality: Modern and Contemporary Women Artists from Turkey and the 2013 group exhibition Past and Future at the İstanbul Modern.

In 2019, SALT presented, Our Blissful Souvenirs, a comprehensive exhibit of Nur Koçak's work at SALT Beyoğlu and SALT Galata. The exhibit covered Koçak's work from the 1960s and 2010s including selections of early drawings and photographs, and explored representations of women in popular culture and the impact on Turkey.
