= Ayşe Ören =

Turkish architect, designer and sculptor (born 1980)

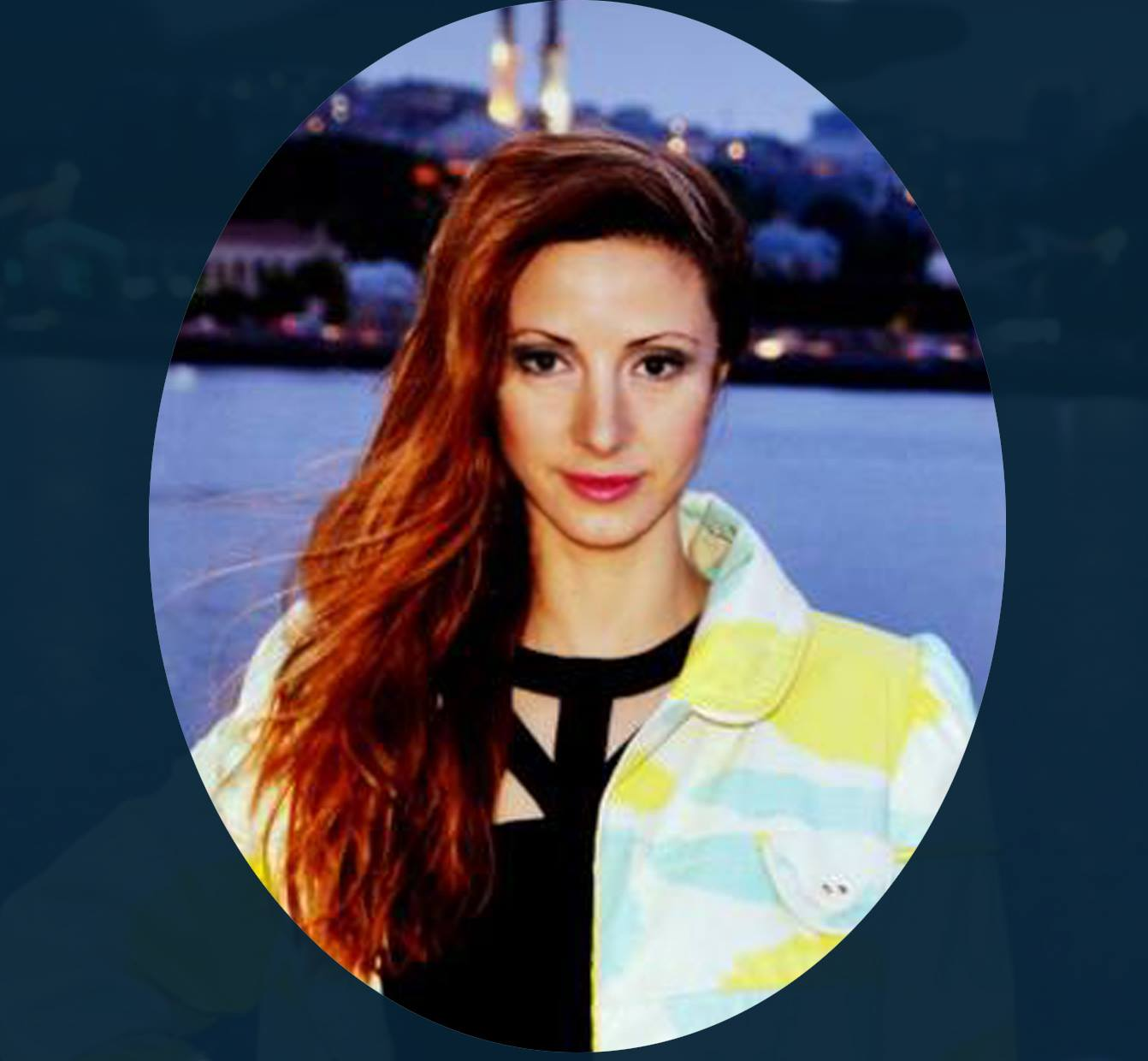
- Born: May 28, 1980 (age 46); Ankara
- Education: Bilkent University
- Occupation: Interior Architect
- Website: ayseoren.com

Ayşe Ören (born May 28, 1980) is a multidisciplinary artist, architect, and designer. Her works include abstract art, sculpture, furniture and product design, as well as graphic design. Educated as an architect, her broad interests span such fields as history, philosophy and psychology, and space architecture.

== Early life ==
After finishing high school at TED Ankara College Foundation Schools, she studied Architecture, Interior Architecture and Environmental Design at Bilkent University in Ankara, and graduated in 2006.

== Career ==
She was the first designer accepted into A Technopark (Boğaziçi University). Her works connect art and technology, drawing it into research and development.

She adopts multi-disciplinary approaches by interpreting them based on cultural experience and future needs.

She embarked on a project titled 'Smartables' that converts living spaces into comfortable, safe and manageable areas. She aims to build somatosensory bridges between cities and people.

== Select exhibitions ==
Solo exhibitions

- 2009 – Istanbul Design Week, Kiss Chair, Turkey
- 2010 – Istanbul Design Week, dönme dolap (ferris wheel), Turkey
- 2010 – JCI World Congress, Osaka Japan, Paradox

Group Exhibitions

- 2010 – 100% Design London
- 2012 – States of Matter Exhibition, Armaggan Art&Design Gallery, Istanbul
- 2013 – Ministry of Science, Industry and Technology, the 1st Edition of Technology Development Zones Summit
- 2013– AKIB (Mediterranean Exporters' Associations) Furniture R&D Project Exhibition Change (modular bookcase) Mersin, Turkey
- 2013– Innovation Week – Furniture R&D Modular Bookcase- Change
- 2013– Istanbul Design Week- Modular Bookcase, Change, with the Design Spirit Group, 40 Turkish Designers
- 2013– Ministry of Science, Industry and Technology- Techno-initiative summit- Modular bookcase Change, Istanbul, Turkey
- 2014– Jacop De Baan – Dream Design collaboration, overseas activities to introduce the Turkish designers internationally
- Dutch Design Week
- London Design Festival
- Istanbul Design Week
- 2014– Contemporary International- Galley MCDR, Sculpture Too Funky
- 2015– Design Spirit- 40 Turkish Designers, DDF and Development Agency, Products Greater and Rockets

== Recognition ==
- 2009 – Michael Jackson "Live Forever Monument" design competition – Off the Wall – People's Choice – World first prize – USA
- 2009 – British Council, Design Entrepreneur of the Year
- 2010 – Ministry of Science, Industry and Technology, the first designer to receive the Techno-initiative capital support
- 2010 – Boğaziçi University, Technopark, the first design company to be accepted amongst the Organizations and Technoparks
- 2010 – 10 Outstanding People of TOYP Turkey – Cultural Field – First Prize in Turkey
- 2012 – HayalEt Innovation, Business Development and Entrepreneurship Platform operated by Boğaziçi University, Business Development Training
