= Nilbar Güreş =

Turkish artist

- Born: 1977 (age 48–49); Istanbul, Turkey
- Website: nilbargures.org

Nilbar Güreş (b. 1977) is a Turkish contemporary artist known for her work in various mediums, including photography, video, and performance art. Nilbar Güreş work is characterized by a critical approach to traditional cultural narratives using mixed media to reflect elements from her Kurdish and Turkish heritage. "Her work deals with social questions such as cultural diversity or queer modes of life and highlights the possibilities of an open society". Güreş often uses textiles, collages, and staged photographs to challenge conventional roles imposed on women by society. Her work is influenced by her cross-cultural experiences, living and working between Turkey and Austria.

== Early life and education ==
Born in Istanbul, Turkey (b. 1977), Nilbar Güreş received a B.A. in painting from Marmara University. She continued her studies in Vienna at the Academy of Fine Arts where she received an M.A. in painting & graphics. She went on to further her studies at the Academy of Fine Arts specializing in Art and Textile Pedagogy.

== Career ==
- In 2026, Güreş represented the Turkish Pavillion in the 61st Venice Biennale, with her exhibition titled A Kiss on the Eyes. The exhibition was curated by Başak Doğa Temur.
- In 2023, she received the Outstanding Artist Award for Photography, from the Ministry for Arts And Culture, Vienna, Austria.
- In 2009, Güreş showed her series Unknown Sports at ‘What Keeps Mankind Alive’, the 11th Biennale in Istanbul. These works depicted women on different Gymansitic’s apparatuses or in different parts of the gym using kitchen ware and clothing to complete different tasks. In all of these pieces the women are presented as the main subject are strong and steady despite being in motion or balancing precariously on bowls and beams.
- In 2010 she released her series TrabZONE, the image Junction captures two women at a crossroad. This symbolization aligns with themes of racial identity and femininity that are present in her other pieces. In another piece in this series the wife is the main subject but her face is covered by household quilts that she is carrying. This piece follows the same suit as the other images in the series because none of the women’s faces are seen.
- That same year, she released the series that depicted women from just outside Istanbul with digital photographs. Some of these images emulated family portraits and others had women in obscure poses that represented different power dynamics.
- In 2014 her quilted piece was shown in a multi-sensory exhibit curated at the Van Abbemuseum.
- In 2017, Güreş expanded into the third dimension with a mixed media sculpture piece, Hey, Hairy Fire, Don’t Fall Asleep.
- 1m 2021, Güreş completed her most recent work, which was a black and white photography series, a territory that Güreş has yet to have published work in.

== Major works ==
Some of her notable works include "Clothed House", which features homes covered in traditional fabrics, and "Open Phone Booth", a commentary on public and private spaces in modern society.

== Awards and recognition ==
- 2023: Outstanding Artist Award for Photography, Ministry for Arts And Culture, Vienna, Austria; Research Grant, Ministry for Arts and Culture Austria
- 2021: Prix Maud Mottier Award, Switzerland
- 2018: De'Longhi Art Projects Artist Award, United Kingdom
- 2015: BC21 (Belvedere Contemporary) Art Award, Austria
- 2014: Msgr. Otto Mauer Award, Austria
- 2013: Professor-Hilde-Goldschmidt-Award, Austria
