= Setenay Özbek =

Turkish artist (born 1961)

Setenay Özbek (born 1961, in Istanbul, Turkey) is a Turkish-born artist, writer, and documentary filmmaker. Özbek is of Ubykh descent.

== Biography ==
Özbek was born in 1961 in Istanbul, Turkey to a family of Ubykh origin, from the Dechen (Adyghe: Дэчэн) clan. She attended Erenköy Girls High School. In 1990, she graduated from Marmara University, within the Faculty of Fine Arts in the Department of Performing Arts.

From 1983 to 1986, Özbek studied art informally at the "Istasyon Fine Art Academy", under the tutelage of several artists, Sabri Berkel, Hülya Düzenli, Erkan Özdilek and Ergül Özkutan. Her abstract expressionist paintings are created in both acrylic and oil paint, they have a bold appearance due to the contrasting colours and shapes. Since 1986, Özbek went on to branch out into documentary filmmaking.

In 2009, she was awarded first prize for the Bakrac Art Gallery 30th Year Painting Competition. In 2009, Fifth Tashkent Biennale of Contemporary Art, "The 3rd Runner up".

She is a member of International PEN Association of Writers and International Association of Art (A.I.A.A) to the United Nations Educational, Scientific and Cultural Organization (UNESCO).

In 2015, Özbek moved to the seaside town of Bodrum, Turkey and opened an art school for local children.

== Filmography ==
Films
Year	Title	Role	Type	Notes
1990	Nazar Boncuğu		Documentary	Turkish Radio and Television Corporation (TRT)
1989	Profesör Ergin İnan		Documentary	Turkish Radio and Television Corporation (TRT)
1988	Altın		Documentary	Turkish Radio and Television Corporation (TRT)

== Select art exhibitions ==
=== Solo exhibitions ===
- 2019 "Selection", Gallery Binyıl - Hamam Arts Hub HAH, Kuruçeşme, Istanbul, Turkey
- 2017 "Performance Artist", International Ataşehir Municipality Festival, Istanbul, Turkey
- 2017 "Selection", Frankie Istanbul, Sofa Hotel, Istanbul, Turkey
- 2016 "Imaginary Transformation", Kent Art Gallery, Ankara, Turkey
- 2014 "Inner Reminiscences", Anna Laudel Art Gallery, Istanbul, Turkey
- 2014 - "Inner Reminiscences", Art 350 Gallery, Istanbul, Turkey
- 2012 - "Inner Reminiscences", Berze Collectibles, Istanbul, Turkey
- 2012 - "Without Borders", Art 350 Gallery, Istanbul, Turkey
- 2011 - Gallery Espas, Istanbul, Turkey
- 2010 – TIGGES, Rechtsanwälte, Düsseldorf, Germany
- 2010 - Bakrac Art Gallery, Istanbul, Turkey
- 2009 - "Across Land And Time" International Art Studio "Radovan Trnavac Mica", Valjevo, Serbia
- 2009 - “Cosmos” Rep. of Turkey, Ministry of Foreign Affairs, Suna Çokgür Ilıcak Art Gallery, Ankara, Turkey
- 2008 - "Cosmos", Austria Consulate General Culture Office, Istanbul, Turkey
- 2008 - "Dedicated to the Moment" Gallery Binyil, Istanbul, Turkey
- 2007 - "Sincerity" Gallery Artist, Istanbul, Turkey
- 2007 – "Inner Reminiscences" Gallery-A, Istanbul, Turkey
- 2006 – 6. Ankara Fine Arts Fair, Gallery Binyil, Ankara, Turkey
- 2006 – İş Bankası Art Gallery, Izmir, Turkey
- 2005 – Ankara Fine Arts Fair, Galeri X, Ankara, Turkey
- 2005 – Art Istanbul 2005, Istanbul, Turkey

=== Group exhibitions ===
- 2021 - Merqez Art Space, Bodrum Marina Yacht Club, Bodrum
- 2021 - Contemporary Istanbul (Fall), Gallery Binyıl Parallel Exhibition, Istanbul, Turkey
- 2021 - Artcontact İstanbul, Tabularasa Transnational Art, Istanbul, Turkey
- 2021 - Contemporary Istanbul (Spring), Gallery Binyıl, Istanbul, Turkey
- 2020 - Contemporary Istanbul, Gallery Binyıl, Istanbul, Turkey
- 2019 - Ramart Platform, Turkish and Islamic Art Museum, Istanbul, Turkey
- 2019 - "Global Views Istanbul", Nişantaşı, Istanbul, Turkey https://globalviews.consulting/representing/#Setenay
- 2019 - 40 Artists, İstinye Park, Istanbul, Turkey
- 2018 - "Blue and Green", 20 Artists Exhibition, Alta Sanat, Bodrum, Turkey
- 2018 - Merey Collection Exhibition, Tophane-i Amire, Tophane, İstanbul, Turkey
- 2017 - Florence Biennale XI, Florence, Italy
- 2017 - Galleria Luz de la Vida, Malaga, Spain
- 2016 - In Honor of Barış Manço, Beşiktaş Municipality Gallery, Beşiktaş, Istanbul, Turkey
- 2014 - "War, Exile, Life" – KAFDAV, Gallery Uray, Çankaya Municipality, Ankara, Turkey
- 2013 - "9 artist / 9 works", Delegation of Turkey to the EU, Brussel, Belgium
- 2013 - "Free and 90, Republic Exhibition", Embassy of the Republic of Turkey, Berlin, Germany
- 2011 - Citibank A.Ş. and Gallery Espas, Citigold Select, Levent, Istanbul, Turkey
- 2011 - K.T.O. Konya Karatay University 1st International Art, Culture, Science Days, Konya, Turkey
- 2011 - Izmir 1st International Art Biennale, Izmir, Turkey
- 2011 - IROK Gallery, Horst, Netherlands
- 2010 - "Power of Dynamism", Gallery Binyıl, Istanbul, Turkey
- 2010 - WALL FOR PEACE – W - AFPIAAP, Sanski, Sarajevo, Bosnia and Herzegovina
- 2010 - "FEED_BACK," group exhibition, Los Angeles Center for Digital Art (LACDA), Los Angeles, California, United States, curated by: Roxanne Brousseau-Félio
- 2010 - "Comparison of Tomorrow in Turkey", Beşiktaş Art Gallery, Istanbul, Turkey
- 2010 - Fourth International Art Forum, Sharm El Sheikh, Egypt
- 2010 - Egypt Culture Centre, Istanbul, Turkey
- 2009 - 5th Tashkent International Biennale of Contemporary Art, Uzbekistan
- 2008 - "October Passage VII", Istanbul Technical University (ITU) Maslak, Istanbul
- 2008 - 3rd International Art Festival, Dryanovo, Bulgaria
- 2007 - International Art Camp, group exhibition and art auction, Association Saint Henri, Toulouse, France
- 2007 - "Uchisar Group Exhibition", French Cultural Association, Istanbul, Turkey
- 2007 - Adana Caucasian Culture Association, Adana, Turkey
- 2007 - INTES Art Gallery, Ankara, Turkey
- 2007 – "Caucasian Art and Cultural Heritage", Belgian North Caucasian Association, MuHKa Museum, Belgium
- 2007 – International Art Symposium and Group Exhibition, in Uchisar and Istanbul, Turkey
- 2007 – Baglarbasi Caucasian Culture Association, Istanbul / Turkey
- 2006 – Adana Caucasian Culture Association "An Invitation For The Peace", Adana / Turkey
- 2006 – 238th Summer Exhibition, Royal Academy of Arts, London, England (shortlisted)
- 2005 – Mersin University "October Passage IV", Mersin / Turkey

== Bibliography ==
- Özbek, Setenay (2002). Gecenin Mavisi (Blue Of The Night). Gendaş Kültür Publications. ISBN 975-308-359-9.
- Özbek, Setenay (2005). Hiç Kimse Bir Başkası Olamaz (No One Can Be Another). Cadde Publications. ISBN 975-6326-26-3.
- Berzeg, Sefer E. (2013). Çerkes-Vıbıhlar Soçi'nin İnsanları (Circassian-Ubyky People of Sochi). Ankara, Turkey: Kafdav Academic Research and Publications. ISBN 978-605-89687-4-5.
- Özbek, Setenay (2022). Kafdağı'nın Ateşi: Büyük Sürgün. Ankara, Turkey: Kafdav Literary Publications. ISBN 978-975-2403-19-2.

== See also ==
- List of Turkish painters
- List of Turkish writers
