= Canan Tolon =

Turkish-born artist (born 1955)

- Born: 1955 (age 70–71)
- Education: Ecole Française d’Istanbul, Napier University, Fachhochschule, Middlesex University/Architectural Association, University of California, Berkeley
- Website: www.canantolon.com

Canan Tolon (born 1955) is a Turkish-born artist who now lives and works in Emeryville, California. Tolon works in the mediums of printmaking, painting, drawing, sculpture, and installation.

She has exhibited internationally in Ankara, Istanbul, Kiev, London, Los Angeles, New York, Oakland and San Francisco. In 2010, one of Tolon's paintings, "Glitch VI" (2008) was a highlight at Sotheby's auction in Turkey, and in 2012, Art + Auction named Tolon one of the 50 Next Most Collectible Artists. A Los Angeles Times review in 2014 noted that Tolon's paintings "highlight our tendency to look for recognizable forms" and "also perhaps a comment on the degraded quality of our image landscape."

== Early life and education ==
Tolon was born in Istanbul in 1955 and spent her childhood in France. after graduating from the Ecole Française d’Istanbul (1975) She studied design and architecture at Napier University in Edinburgh, Scotland (1976), Fachhochschule, Trier, Germany (1979), Middlesex University/Architectural Association, London, England (1980) and University of California, Berkeley, where she earned her master in architecture (1983). Tolon then worked as an architect in France and in San Francisco.

== Collections ==
Tolon's work is held in the following public collections:

- British Museum, London
- İstanbul Modern, Istanbul IKSV (Istanbul Foundation for Culture and the Arts)

== Awards and residencies ==
- 1989: San Francisco Focus Design Award, San Francisco, California
- 1991: Artist in Residence, Bemis Foundation, Omaha, Nebraska
- 1992: Artist in Residence, Bemis Foundation, Omaha, Nebraska
- 1994: Western States Arts Federation (WESTAF)/NEA; Painting
- 1995: Artist in Residence, MacDowell Colony, Peterborough, New Hampshire
- 1996: Artist in Residence, The Camargo Foundation, Cassis, France
- 1997: Gamblin Fellowship Artist in Residence, Vermont Studio Center
- 1998: Berllanderi Sculpture Workshop, Wales
- 1998: Arts Council of Wales
- 1999: Center for Mediterranean Studies, Georgetown University, Washington, D.C.
- 2000: Cité internationale des arts, Paris, France
- 2007: Emeryville Public Arts Award, Emeryville, California
- 2012: The Kidder Residency in the Arts, Institute for the Humanities, University of Michigan, Ann Arbor
