= Müfide Kadri =

Turkish artist (1889/90–1912)

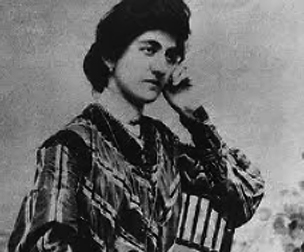
Müfide Kadri (date unknown)

Müfide Kadri Hanım (1889/90, in Istanbul – 1912, in Istanbul) was a Turkish painter and composer; one of the first female artists in Turkey and the first professional female art teacher in the Ottoman Empire. She created mostly portraits and scenes with figures.

== Biography ==
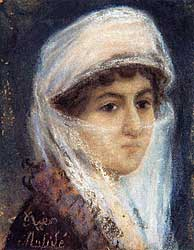
Self-portrait

She lost her mother while still a baby and was adopted by Kadri Bey, a distant relative of some distinction, and his wife, who was childless. She was taught entirely at home by private tutors, who discovered her artistic talent.

She began painting seriously at the age of ten and took lessons from Osman Hamdi Bey. Then, she received instruction in drawing and watercolors from Salvatore Valeri, an Italian- born Professor at the "Sanayi-i Nefise Mektebi" (School of Fine Arts, now part of the Mimar Sinan Fine Arts University). She also learned how to play piano, violin, and traditional instruments such as the oud and kemenche.

At the urging of Hamdi Bey, she sent some paintings to an exhibition in Munich, where they were awarded a gold medal. Shortly after, she became a music teacher at Istanbul Girls High School and was later assigned to teach art and embroidery. She also gave painting lessons to Abdul Hamid II's daughter at the Adile Sultan Palace. During this period, she also composed music to the words of various poets that was published in several cultural magazines.

Shortly after showing three of her works at a major exhibition held by the Istanbul Opera Society in 1911, she was diagnosed with tuberculosis, but it was too late to provide effective treatment and she died the following year. After her death, forty of her paintings were sold to benefit the "Ottoman Painters Society". Kadri Bey felt so much grief, he made an Umrah to Mecca and lived there until forced to leave when Ottoman rule was overthrown.

She was buried in Karacaahmet Cemetery. Her tombstone bears an inscription by the well-known calligrapher, İsmail Hakkı Altunbezer, and her life served as inspiration for the novel Son Eseri (Last Work) by Halide Edib Adıvar, published in serial form in the newspaper Tanin .

== Selected paintings ==
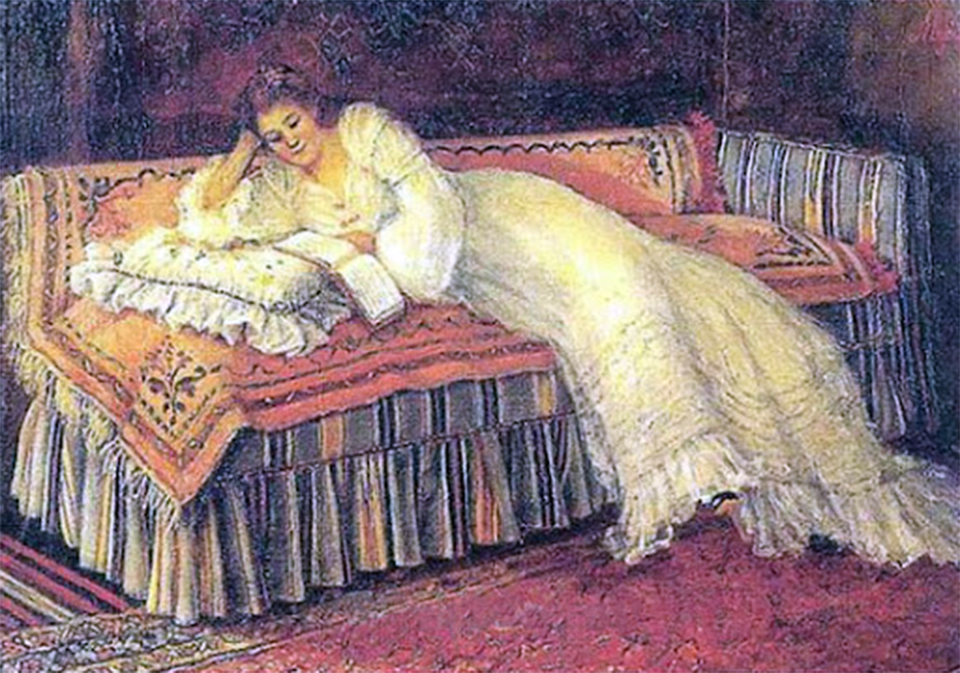
Woman Reading a Book

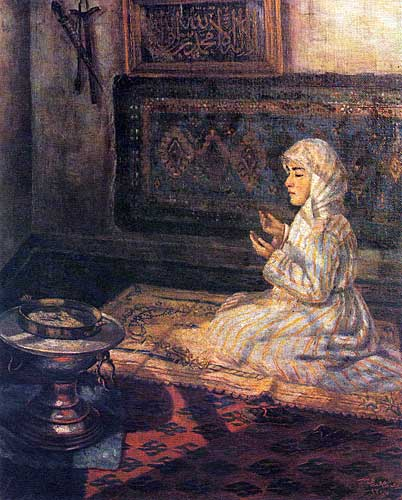
Praying Girl

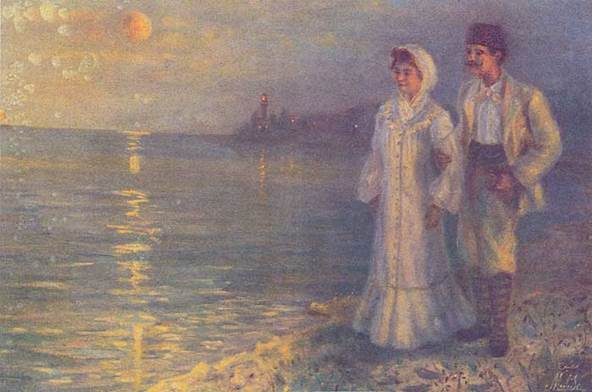
Lovers on the Beach

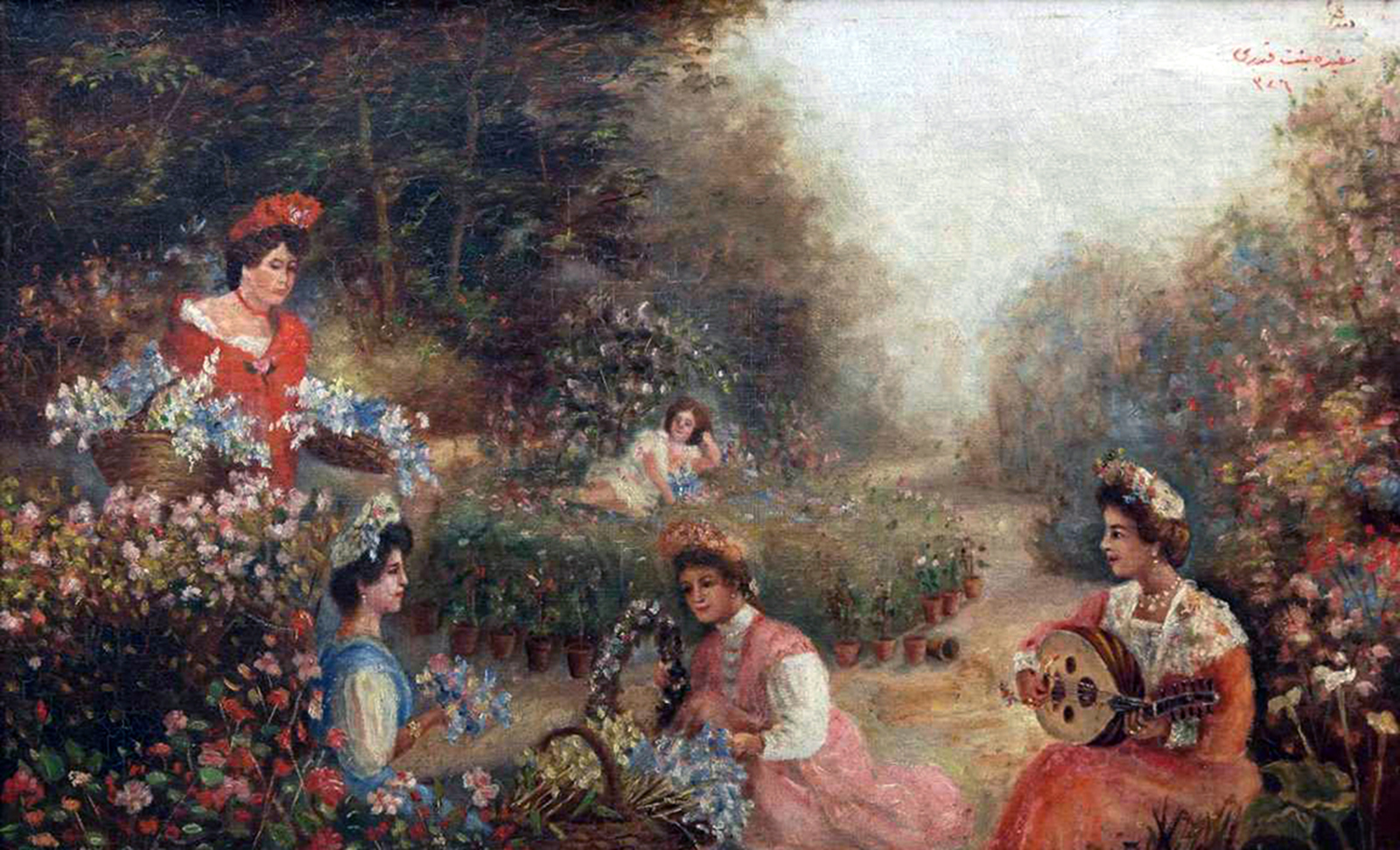
Woman Playing the Oud at the Picnic Area

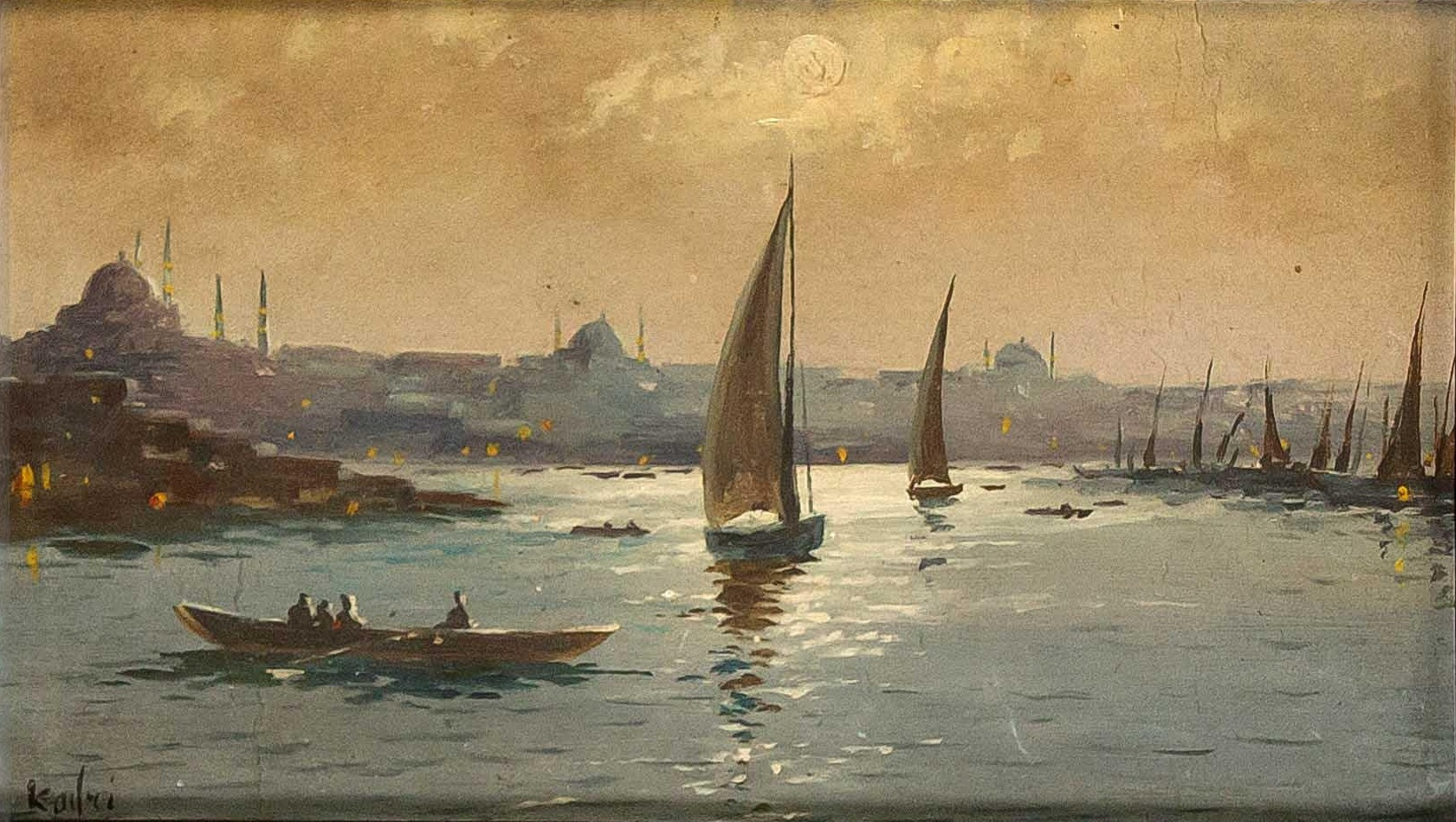
View of Istanbul on the Bosphorus
