= Hatice Güleryüz =

Turkish artist (born 1968)

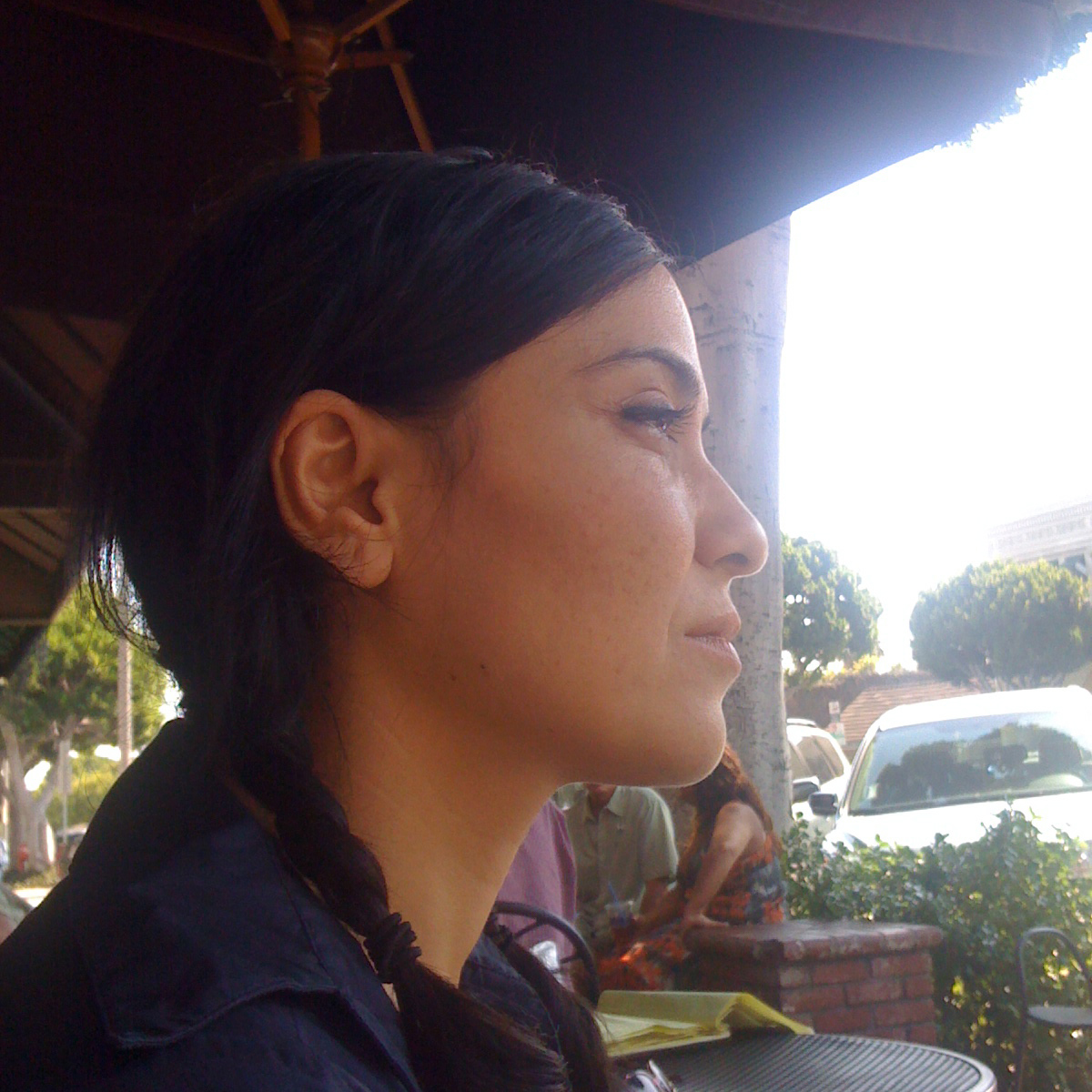
- Hatice Güleryüz, 2009
- Born: February 18, 1968 (age 58); Denizli, Turkey
- Education: Jan van Eyck Academie, Maastricht; Plymouth University, England; Willem de Kooning Academie, Rotterdam
- Known for: Photography, video, art books, and drawing
- Notable work: "The Bus in LA LA Land," 2008; "Strange Intimacies," 2005; "Intensive Care," 2001

Hatice Güleryüz (born February 18, 1968) is a contemporary Turkish artist. She has worked in video, film, photography, art books and drawing.

== Life and work ==
Hatice Güleryüz was born in Denizli, Turkey. She has a bachelor's degree in fine art from Dokuz Eylül University, in İzmir, Turkey, and an MA from Plymouth University in England. She did post-graduate work at the Piet Zwart Institute of the Willem de Kooning Academie in Rotterdam, and research at the Jan van Eyck Academie in Maastricht, both in The Netherlands.

Her work has been shown in museums, galleries and festivals in many countries, including the Centre Pompidou, Berkeley Art Museum and Pacific Film Archive, Freud Museum, and the 9th International Istanbul Biennial, 16 September to 30 October 2005.

Two of Güleryüz's Super 8 films, The First Ones (2000) and Intensive Care (2001) were included on the box set Radical Closures, a collection that "features works produced in response to situations of physical or ideological closure resulting from war and territorial conflicts" in the Middle East. It was compiled by Akram Zaatari.

== Published works ==
- Strange intimacies = Tuhaf yakınlıklar. Istanbul: [s.n.], 2006. ISBN 9789757363439.
