= Hülya Vurnal İkizgül =

Turkish artist (born 1967)

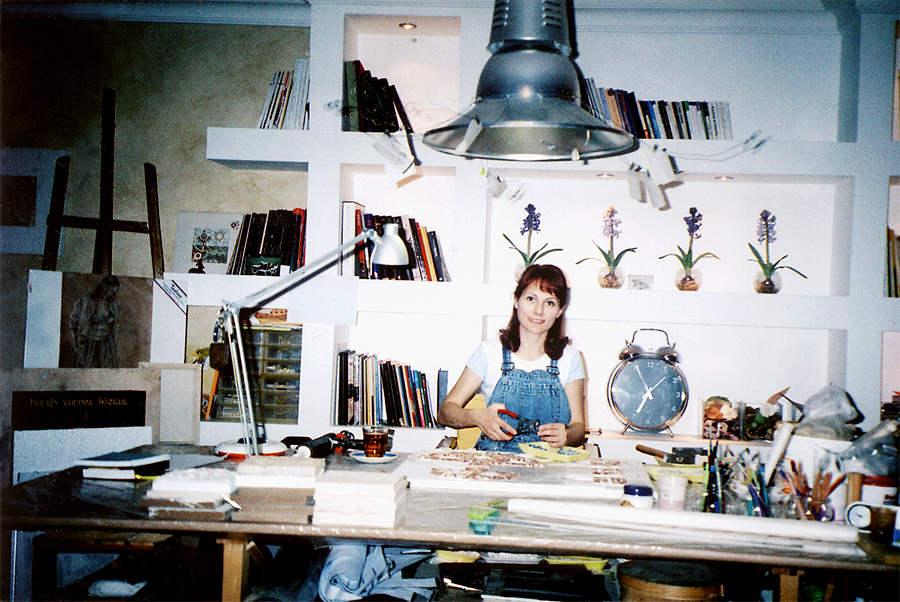
- Hülya Vurnal İkizgül in her workshop (2006)
- Born: 1967 (age 58–59); Istanbul, Turkey
- Known for: Mosaic, sculpture, ceramic
- Website: www.hulyaikizgul.com

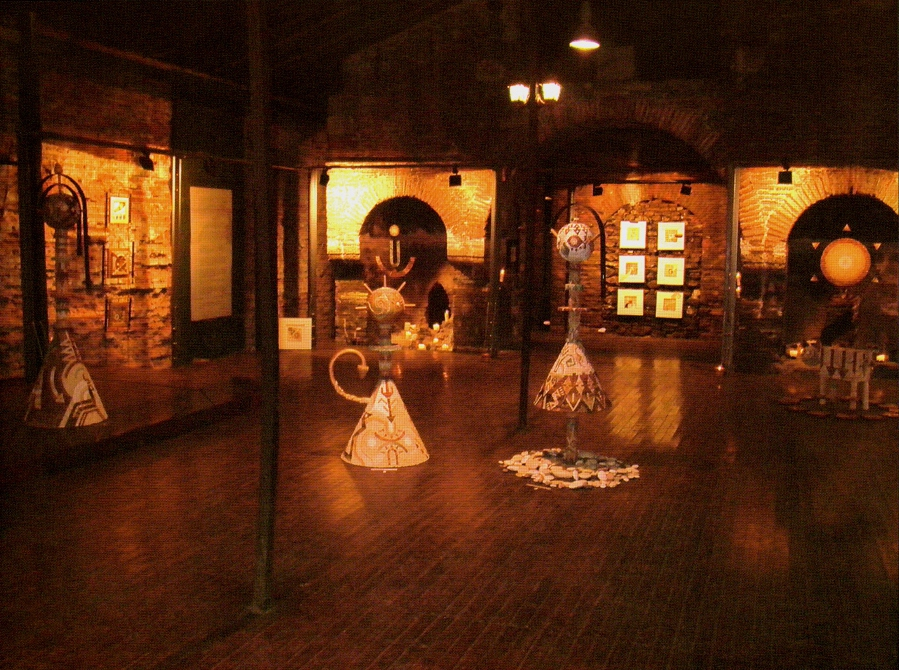
Exposition of Statut Mosaic, at Darphane-i Amire in Istanbul

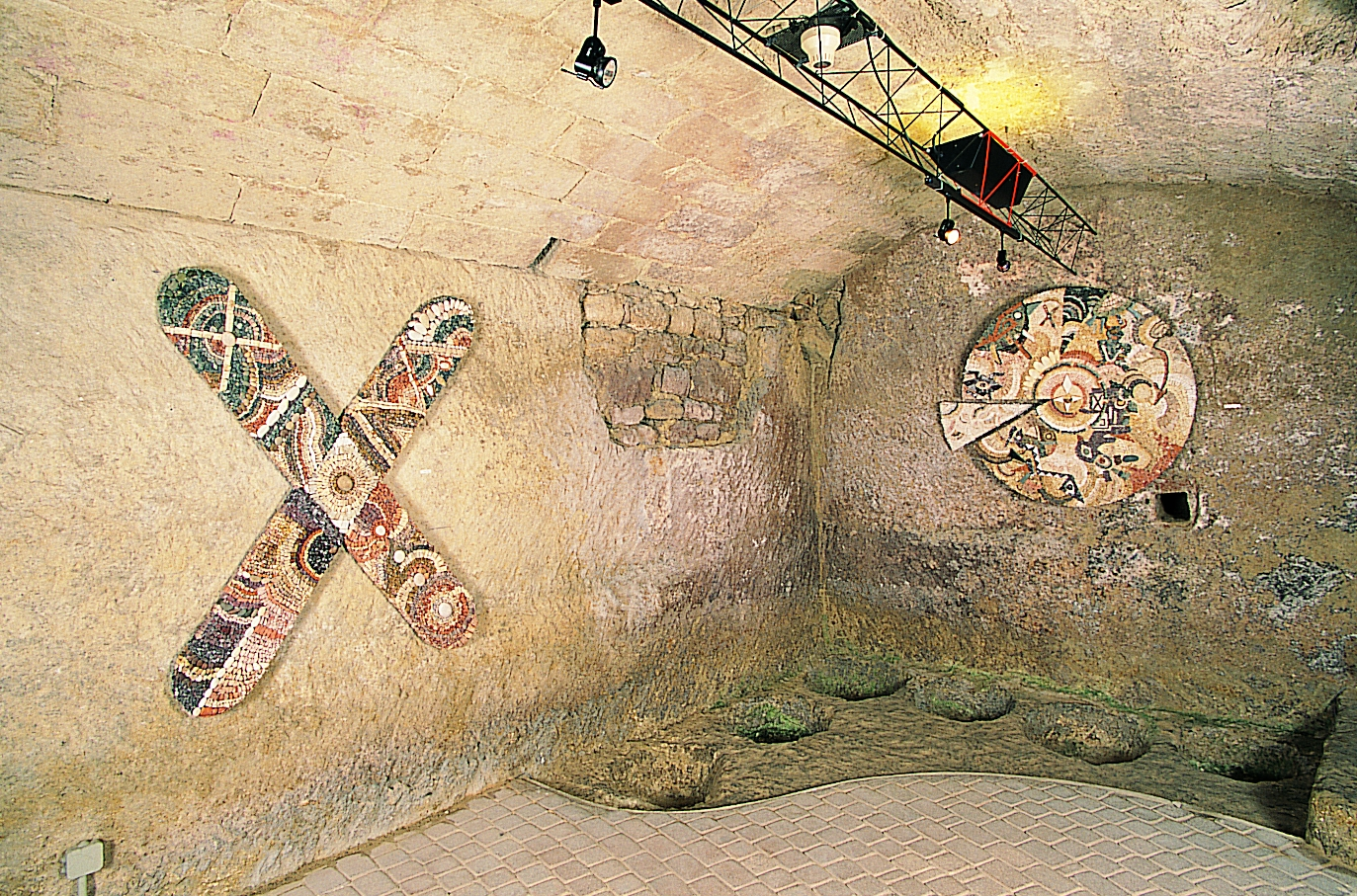
Works of Hülya İkizgül in the Museum of Archaeology of Istres, France

Hülya Vurnal İkizgül (born 1967) is a Turkish mosaicist, sculptor and ceramic artist.

== Biography ==
She was born in 1967 in Istanbul, Turkey. Following her graduation from the Faculty of Arts at the Marmara University in 1990, she made her master's degree in the same faculty. She worked in the Workshop of Mural under the direction of renowned painter Mustafa Pilevneli. She prepared her thesis on artists Eren Eyüboğlu and Bedri Rahmi Eyüboğlu, titled The Art of Mosaic and the Mosaics of Bedri Rahmi - Eren Eyüboğlu.

According to critics, Hülya Vurnal İkizgül creates mosaik works using stones of varying sizes and colors, often arranged into polychorme compositions. Her visual artworks are sometimes presented alongside poetry and music that she has composed, reflecting her involvement in multiple artistic disciplines. Critics have described her work as combining visual, musical, and literary elements into a unified artistic expression, with themes that evoke a dreamlike atmosphere.

From October 13 to October 29, 1992, she opened an "Exposition of Paintings and Mosaic Sculptures" at the historic Museum of Hagia Sophia (Ayasofya Museum) in Istanbul.

From 1 to October 31, 1994, as an invited artist representing of the modern art of mosaic, she exposed her "Mosaic Paintings and Sculptures" at the Museum of Archaeology of Istres in Marseille, France. Among ten prestigious exposures, it is noteworthy to also name that one of the "Paintings and Mosaic Sculptures" decorated the historical Darphane-i Amire (Imperial Mint) in Istanbul between October 16 and November 3, 2002.

Inter alia, she has three works at the Museum of Archaeology of Istres, in Marseille.
