= Ruzen Atakan =

Turkish-Cypriot artist (born 1966)

Ruzen Atakan (born 1966) is a Turkish-Cypriot painter and educator. Atakan was born in 1966 in Akıncılar, she is the daughter of a school teacher Kemal Atakan. She graduated from Gazi University Turkey, in 1988. She has had three solo shows and took part in mixed and group exhibitions in Cyprus as well as overseas. She teaches at Fine Arts Secondary School, Nicosia, Cyprus.

== Exhibitions ==
Ruzen participated in the following exhibitions:

- 1988 Group Exhibition in British Council, Ankara.
- 1990 Group Exhibition at Fluxus Art Gallery, Nicosia.
- 1991 1st Solo Exhibition at Fluxus Art Gallery, Nicosia.
- 1991 Contemporary Turkish Cypriot Painting Exhibition, London.
- 1994 2nd Solo Exhibition at Atatürk Cultural Center, Nicosia.
- 1994 Namık Kemal Painting Prize, Famagusta.
- 1997 3rd Solo Exhibition Atatürk Cultural Center, Nicosia.
- 1977 State Art and Sculpture Prize, Nicosia.
- 1999 Group Exhibition at Gotland University College, Gotland,
- 1999 Namık Kemal Painting Prize, Famagusta.
- 1999 Group Exhibition at Kunstmesse, Salzburg,
- 2001 Group Exhibition at IMKB, Istanbul.
- 2003 Bi-communal Exhibition at Hilton Hotel, Nicosia.
- 2003 Group Exhibition, İzmir International Fair, İzmir.
- 2004 4th Solo Exhibition, "April Exhibition", Iktisatbank Gallery, Nicosia
- 2011- Bedra du Romiu Group Exhibition, Laiki Bank Art Gallery and Various Group Exhibitions, Cyprus
- 2016 April Group Exhibition, Gallery Preporod, Sarajevo, Bosnia Herzegovina
- 2017 Exhibition entitled “BLENDED”, Stone House, Nicosia /Cyprus.
