= Hayal Pozanti =

Turkish-American painter (born 1983)

- Born: 1983 (age 42–43); Istanbul, Turkey
- Education: Yale University; Sabancı University; Robert College
- Website: hayalpozanti.com

Hayal Pozanti (born 1983, Istanbul, Turkey) is a Turkish-American artist, based in the United States. Pozanti became internationally known in the early 2010s for her bright abstract paintings of geometric forms, based on a hieroglyphic alphabet which Pozanti invented to reflect on the relationship between human behaviour, artificial intelligence and technology.

Since 2021, Pozanti's paintings have expanded into lush, swirling abstract landscapes evocative of nature and the tide of the subconscious. Her works are held in permanent museum collections worldwide.

== Life and work ==
Hayal Pozanti attended Robert College in Istanbul. After studying visual arts and visual communication design at Sabancı University, she went on to receive an M.F.A. at Yale University in painting and printmaking in 2011. During this time, she created a body of abstract work that allowed her to translate fragments of data into paintings. Informed by ancient Hebrew and Sumerian alphabets, Pozanti synthesized a visual language of hieroglyphs called 'Instant Paradise', which she describes as "a framework for understanding the effects of technology on human beings and culture".

Her work Ciphers (2015) was a direct rendering of data into a glyph alphabet of 31 characters. The paintings from Ciphers (2015) feature layered abstractions of the shapes, and were displayed in the gallery with abstract sculptures of similar shapes.

In 2015, Pozanti had her first major solo museum exhibition, Deep Learning at The Aldrich Contemporary Art Museum. Deep Learning debuted a series of paintings and digital animations based on the thirty-one character alphabet. Pozanti used the alphabet to generate shapes which never repeat themselves, mining data about the impact of technology on human lives.

Pozanti revisited the theme in her solo exhibition Instant Paradise (2017), using the lexicon as source material for her paintings, sculptures, animations and sound pieces. Each shape in Instant Paradise has been assigned a number and a letter from the English alphabet, allowing her to literally 'translate' information through a personalized encryption system. She has created a typeface from her characters, as well as phonemes that she resources for her animations and her sound pieces, respectively.

During the COVID-19 pandemic, Pozanti moved to a mountain town in Vermont, where she began to paint en-plein-air. Gradually, Pozanti's work shifted focus to ecological concerns. Inspired by the natural landscape of Vermont, her growing awareness of climate change-related disaster, and science fiction philosophies, Pozanti began painting with her hands rather than brushstrokes, using sustainable oil-sticks to shape forms across the canvas with her entire body. The angular ciphers in her work blossomed into vivid landscapes reminiscent of moving biological forms. Pozanti's work has been compared to the art of Wassily Kandinsky and Jean Arp.

Pozanti's work is held in museum collections worldwide, including Case Western Reserve University, the Cleveland Clinic, Eli and Edythe Broad Art Museum, Fidelity Investments, the JPMorgan Chase Art Collection, Los Angeles County Museum of Art (LACMA), the NewYork-Presbyterian Hospital, the San Jose Museum of Art, the Sheldon Museum of Art, the Soho House Art Collection, the Stanford University Medical Center, and the Hammer Museum.

Pozanti is represented by Timothy Taylor and Jessica Silverman Gallery. Her work has been featured in The Art Newspaper, The New York Times, The Paris Review, Vogue, and many other publications.

== Public art projects ==
In 2021, Pozanti created 'Instant Paradise', an 85-foot-long permanent art installation on the ceiling of the New York Public Library's largest circulating branch, the Stavros Niarchos Foundation Library. 'Instant Paradise' is composed of 95 pieces of fiberboard that were painted and arranged into 12 abstract clusters. Pozanti was inspired by a milestone of written communication throughout human history, from Mesopotamian clay writing tablets; the invention of paper in ancient China; to the World Wide Web.

Other public commissions include the Public Art Fund, New York, NY and Cleveland Clinic and Case Western, Cleveland. Pozanti's work has been presented in institutional solo shows at the Aldrich Contemporary Art Museum, Ridgefield, CT and the Brooklyn Academy of Music, New York.

== Exhibitions ==
=== Solo exhibitions ===
- 2023- The World for a Mirror, Timothy Taylor, New York, NY
- 2022 - Lingering, Jessica Silverman Gallery, San Francisco, California
- 2018 – Murmurs of Earth, Jessica Silverman Gallery, San Francisco, California
- 2017 – .tr, Dirimart, Istanbul, Turkey
- 2016 – Fuzzy Logic, Rachel Uffner Gallery, New York City, New York
- 2016 – Corpus, Levy.Delval, Brussels, Belgium
- 2015 – Deep Learning, Aldrich Contemporary Art Museum, Ridgefield, Connecticut
- 2015 – Scrambler, Halsey Mckay Gallery, East Hampton, New York
- 2015 – Ciphers, Jessica Silverman Gallery, San Francisco, California
- 2013 – Passwords, Duve, Berlin, Germany
- 2013 – New Paintings, Susanne Vielmetter Los Angeles Projects, Los Angeles, California
- 2012 – Co-Real, Jessica Silverman Gallery, San Francisco California

=== Group exhibitions ===
Pozanti's work has been featured in group exhibitions at Public Art Fund, Brooklyn Academy of Music, The Kitchen, MCA Santa Barbara, Cornell Fine Arts Museum, and the Sabanci Museum, Istanbul.
