= Neşe Erdok =

Turkish artist (born 1940)

Neş'e Erdok (born 1940 in Istanbul, Turkey) is a Turkish painter.

She is a contemporary-figurative artist, known for painting distorted figures with large hands and feet.
