= Sevgi Çağal =

Turkish artist (born 1957)

Sevgi Çağal (born February 17, 1957) is a Turkish painter and sculptor.

== Biography ==
Çağal was born on February 17, 1956, in Bursa and grew up in New York City, United States. She was educated in French linguistics at the New York University from 1974 to 1978, from where she received a BA degree. In 1976, Çağal studied history of arts in Paris, France. She completed her education with a MA degree in French linguistics and literature at NYU in 1980.

She moved to Turkey in 1987 and has lived in Istanbul since then. Between 1990 and 1998, Çağal worked in some art workshops of her masters. She opened her own workshop in 1997.

Her works are recognized by their round forms and vibrant color. They can be found in collections all over in Europe, USA and parts of Asia. Her works are recognized by their sensual, round forms. The previous works consisted of almost magnified detail of organic forms. Detail has always been important to her: she believes the essence of being is hidden in the detail. Apples, tulips and sensuouslandscapes are subjects of her work. She studied sculpture with Senan Eynullayev Ehedoğlu in 2005 and has been sculpting bronze sculptures since then. She has had more than forty solo exhibitions in Turkey, Europe and the United States. She lives and works in İstanbul and teaches painting.
