= Nevin Çokay =

Turkish artist (1930–2012)

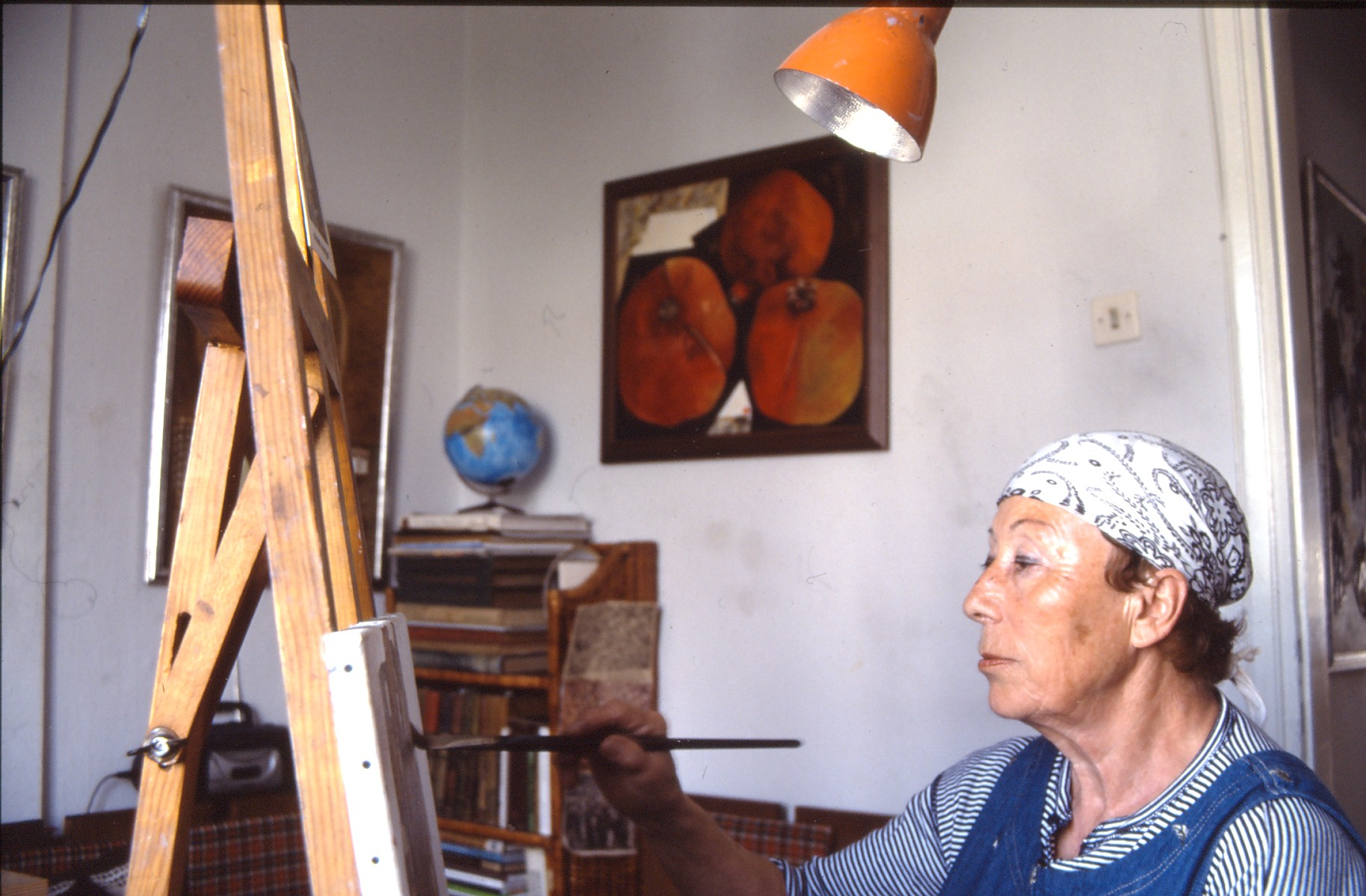
- Nevin Çokay in her atelier
- Born: 1930; Istanbul, Turkey
- Died: 24 July 2012 (aged 81–82); Foça, İzmir Province, Turkey
- Known for: Painting
- Movement: The Group Ten
- Website: www.nevincokay.com

Nevin Çokay (1930 – 24 July 2012) was a Turkish painter and high school teacher of art and history of art.

== Life ==
Çokay was born in Istanbul, and spent her childhood in different regions of Turkey. In 1947, she started to attend to the studio of Bedri Rahmi Eyüboğlu at the Academy of Fine Arts Istanbul, where she finished in 1953. She also joined The Group Ten. Her first exhibition took place in the Gallery "Maya" in Istanbul in 1953. Between 1950 and 1953 she was a member of the State Choir for Turkish folk music under the direction of Nedim Otyam. Beside her participation in concerts and folklore arrangements she also worked as a voice artist and acted in the film Yurda Dönüş.

After 1954 Çokay completely devoted herself to painting. Her paintings were shown in special exhibitions of the State Museum for Painting and Sculptures Istanbul and the Biennale for Young Artist in Paris. In 1961 she won the second prize of the Istanbul Art Festival. In 1979 she was invited to the Netherlands where her pictures were exhibited in different museums and galleries in Deventer, The Hague and Rotterdam for the duration of one year. Her paintings are held in public and private collections in Germany and the Netherlands, in the Istanbul State Art and Sculpture Museum, the Ministry of Culture and Tourism, the city administration of Istanbul, the University of Istanbul and the Umjetnicka Galerij in the former Yugoslavia.

Çokay worked 17 years as a teacher for art and art history in high schools and spent ten years giving private painting lessons in different gallery studios. In the last years of her life, she worked in her private studio in Foça, İzmir Province.

She died at the age of 82 in Foça on July 24, 2012. Çokay was married and had a son.

== See also ==
- Turkish women in fine arts
