= Tomur Atagök =

Turkish museologist, author and academic (1939–2025)

- Born: 6 May 1939; Istanbul, Turkey
- Died: 27 March 2025 (aged 85)
- Occupations: Painter; museologist; author; academic
- Years active: 1966–2025

Academic background
- Education: Robert College
- Alma mater: Oklahoma State University (B.F.A.); University of California, Berkeley (M.F.A.)

Academic work
- Institutions: Yıldız Technical University (1984–2025)

Tomur Atagök (6 May 1939 – 27 March 2025) was a Turkish painter, museologist, author and academic.

== Early life and education ==
Atagök was born in Istanbul, Turkey on 6 May 1939 and in 1959, she graduated from the American College for Girls. She continued her education in plastic arts at the Oklahoma State University with a bachelor of fine arts, and from 1962 until 1964 she studied at the California College of the Arts (CCA). She completed her master's degree in plastic arts in 1965 at the University of California, Berkeley.

== Artwork ==
Atagök's first solo exhibition was held in 1966, at the Istanbul State Fine Arts Gallery. She had numerous personal and collective exhibitions in countries all over the world, including the UK, France, Egypt, Algeria and the US. Some of her works are included in the Elgiz Collection and displayed at the Proje4L / Elgiz Museum of Contemporary Art in Istanbul. Apart from her work as an artist, she wrote numerous essays on Museum Studies, and organized and held multiple conferences with notable artists.

== Academic career ==
Atagök began working at MSU Sculpture and Painting Museum (Turkish: MSÜ Resim Heykel Müzesi) as Assistant Director in 1980. In 1984, she became the Director of Culture, Press and Foreign Relations at Yıldız Technical University. She became a professor in 1993. In 1989, she founded the first Museology department in Turkey, at Yıldız Technical University. She was the dean of the Art and Design Faculty in Yıldız Technical University, and the tutor of Museums and Museology course in the same department at the time of her death in March 2025.

She also attended artistic activities in Romania and Greece as a representative of Turkey and curated multiple exhibitions for the Turkish Ministry of Culture.

She wrote about Turkish women artists, her essay titled, "Contemporary Turkish Women Artists" was published in the e-journal, n.paradoxa in February 1997.

== Death ==
Atagök died on 27 March 2025, at the age of 85. (Note: Most sources give her age incorrectly as 86.)
