= Gizem Saka =

Turkish artist

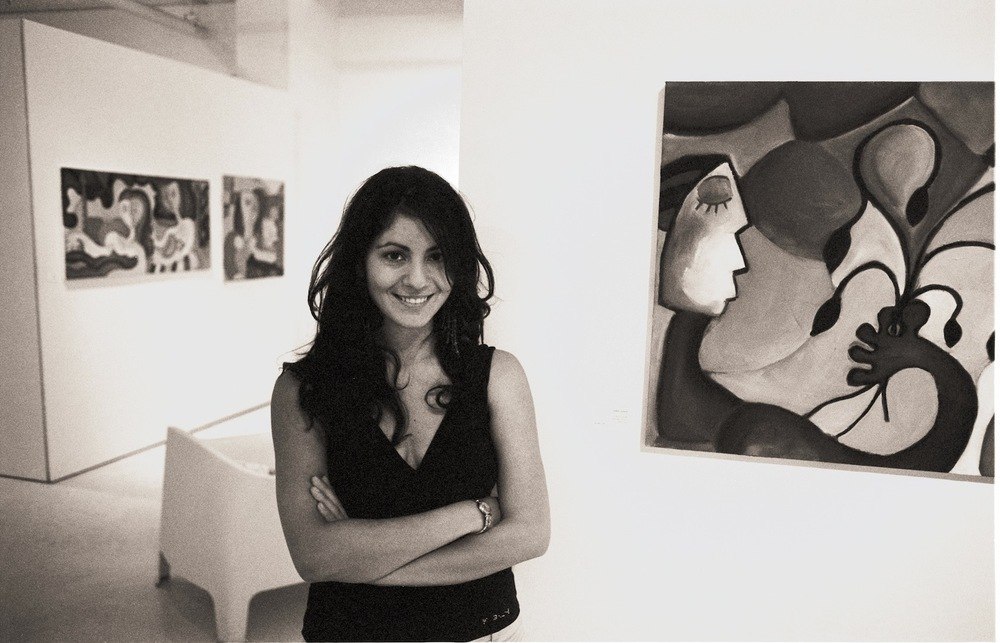
- Gizem Saka, Montreal, 2005
- Born: Gizem Saka; 9 April 1978; Istanbul, Turkey
- Known for: Painting, drawing, sculpture, ceramics, writing
- Notable work: Women, Istanbul Houses, Read My Fortune, Ottoman Iznik Tiles, Book Lovers, Literature in Painting

Gizem Saka (born 9 April 1978, Istanbul) is a contemporary Turkish artist and an economist. She is a senior lecturer at the Wharton School of Business, University of Pennsylvania, and a visiting lecturer at Harvard University, teaching art markets.

== Biography ==
Born and raised in Istanbul, Turkey, Gizem Saka obtained a Bachelor of Science degree in economics from Koç University in 1999. She moved to the United States the same year. In 2008, she received her PhD in behavioral and experimental economics from Cornell University.

While attending college, Saka started drawing and studied pottery and sculptural form. In 2000, she started taking classes at the department of Art and Architecture at Cornell University. In 2005, she had her first solo exhibition in Montreal's Gallery Gora. Since 2005, she has been exhibiting in international venues.

As a young athlete, Saka was the Turkish national champion in gymnastics and between 1989 and 1993, a member of the Turkish national gymnastics team.

== Art ==
Saka's art has the decorative elements of the Middle East and the colors of the Mediterranean. Saka uses her background as a muse. Her main themes are women, reading, Ottoman period Iznik tiles and figures. In an interview, she mentioned that due to the large number of women in her family, she mainly observed feminine joys and sorrows. Her ongoing "Women" collection includes observations of women in everyday life, either having tea, or chatting with friends, kissing their lovers, reading books, having coffee, looking at mirrors.

In the collection Istanbul Houses, Saka depicts naive, primitive cityscapes of her hometown. Her collection "Read my Fortune" was a visual imagery of espresso cups with ground coffee, used in certain cultures as a vessel of fortunetelling.

Her 2013 exhibit at Boston University consisted of large scale canvases depicting 16th century Ottoman sailing ships.

Her new collection is titled Literature in Painting where she lines the canvas as if in a notebook, and writes favorite passages from literary works.

Saka exhibits in local, not-for-profit venues, in international art fairs, galleries, and public spaces. Her paintings are in private collections all around the world.

== Exhibitions ==
- Boston University, MA.
- Berkshires Art Festival, MA.
- Wellesley Free Library, MA
- Paradise City Arts Festival, Northampton, MA
- Besiktas City Hall, Istanbul
- Cape Cod Arts Festival. Hyannis, Ma
- New York International Art Expo. NY.
- Lewiston Art Festival, NY
- Art for Autism, PA
- New York Art Expo, NY
- New York Art Expo, NY
- Bella Arte Gallery, PA
- Lance Armstrong Foundation, TX
- Palmer House Hilton, Chicago, IL
- Gallery Gora, Montreal,
- Gallery Bahariye, Istanbul

Also exhibited at:

- Benjamin Arts Gallery, Hagerstown, Maryland
- Artpic, Los Angeles
- Pittsburgh Center for the Arts, Pittsburgh, Pennsylvania
- Chez-Zee Gallery, Austin, Texas
- Vermont Book Shop, Middlebury, VT
- Lance Armstrong Foundation (Livestrong) fundraising gala, Austin, TX.
- Prints Gallery: Urban Station, Istanbul

== Academics ==
While a PhD student at Cornell University, Gizem Saka taught strategy at the Samuel Curtis Johnson Graduate School of Management; and global economics at the Tepper School of Business at Carnegie Mellon University. Between 2008 and 2011, she taught behavioral economics and experimental economics at Middlebury College in Vermont. In the academic year 2011–12, she taught at Wellesley College in Massachusetts.

Since 2011, she teaches business economics, art economics, and macroeconomics courses at the Wharton School of Business at the University of Pennsylvania.

Saka is interested in the intersection of art and economics, and teaches "Art Markets" at Harvard University.

Her graduate thesis "Essays on Procrastination, Commitment and Fairness", was published as a book. She wrote a blog for PsychologyToday.com on behavioral economics; and was a guest at National Public Radio's Vermont Edition with Jane Lindholm in 2011, "Exploring The Connection Between Altruism And Cheating".

She received the Howard and Abby Milstein, and Ernest Liu Family teaching awards at Cornell University.

== Presentations and public lectures ==
- 2013 – University of Pennsylvania, Neurosurgery Grand Rounds, "Consumer Judgment" lecture
- 2013 – Wharton School of Business, Huntsman Program in International Studies and Business Preceptorial. "Can a $5 garage sale painting ever be worth $40 million? The irresistible economics of the art world"
- 2012 – Davis Museum, MA "Exploring the relationship between economics and art through Sol LeWitt”
- 2011 – Babson College, MBA Lecture in Behavioral Economics
- 2011 – University of Vermont, Honors College, "The Pursuit of Knowledge: Disciplines, Universities, and Engagement,” Social Sciences Plenary Lecturer
- 2010 – University of Cambridge, UK, Interdisciplinary Social Sciences Conference
