= Say =

Say or SAY may refer to:

- Speech, the production of a spoken language

== Arts and media ==
=== Music ===
==== Songs ====
- "Say" (The Creatures song), 1999
- "Say" (John Mayer song), 2007
- "Say" (Method Man song), 2006
- "Say" (Ruel song), 2019
- "Say" (Ryan Cabrera song), 2008
- "Say (All I Need)", by OneRepublic, 2008
- "Say", by Cat Power from Moon Pix, 1998
- "Say", by the Corrs from In Blue, 2000
- "Say", by Grace from FMA, 2016
- "Say", by Johan Reinholdz, 2023
- "Say", by Thenewno2 from EP001, 2006

==== Other uses in music ====
- Say (album), by Misono, 2008
- Scottish Album of the Year Award

=== Other media ===
- Say (magazine), a magazine published by and for Aboriginal youth in Canada
- Sakuranbo Television, a Japanese television station in Yamagata Prefecture, Japan

== People ==
- Emel Say (1927–2011), Turkish painter
- Fazıl Say (born 1970), a Turkish pianist and composer
- Jean-Baptiste Say (1767–1832), a French economist
- Louis Auguste Say (1774–1840), a French businessman and economist, brother of Jean-Baptiste
- Marie Say (1857–1943), a French heiress and aristocrat
- Maurice George Say (1902-1992) British electrical engineer
- Rick Say (born 1979), an Olympic swimmer from Canada
- Thomas Say (1787–1834), an American naturalist and entomologist
- William Say (disambiguation), several people
- Zehra Say (1906–1990), Turkish painter
- Say Chhum, a Cambodian politician
- Say Piseth (born 1990), a Cambodian footballer

== Places ==
- Say, Niger, a town in southwest Niger
- Swanley railway station, Kent, National Rail station code

== Other uses ==
- saʿy, Islamic ritual travel between Safa and Marwa, partway between walking and running

== See also ==
- Said
- Saying
- Seay, a surname
- Says, Switzerland
