= Said, Iran =

Said (Persian: سعيد) may refer to:

- Said, Bavi
- Said, Ramshir
- Said, Shush
