= Said =

Said can refer to:

- Speech, or the act of speaking
- Saʽid, an Arabic male forename and surname
- Said (honorific), a honorific in Islamic culture
- Said, Iran (disambiguation), multiple places in Iran
- Port Said, a city in Egypt
- Saïd Business School of the University of Oxford

== See also ==
- Say (disambiguation)
- Saying
