= William Seay =

William Seay could refer to:

- William E. Seay (1921–2013), American politician from Missouri
- William W. Seay (1948–1968), American soldier and Medal of Honor recipient
