= Seay =

Seay is a surname. Notable people with the surname include:

- Abraham Jefferson Seay (1832–1915), American lawyer, soldier, judge, and politician
- Albert Seay (1916–1984), American musicologist
- Alice Wiley Seay (1858–1937), American social worker
- Bobby Seay (born 1978), American baseball player
- Charles M. Seay (1867–1944), American film director
- Clarence Seay (born 1957), American jazz bassist and composer
- Dick Seay (1904–1981), American baseball player
- Edward T. Seay (1868–1941), American lawyer and politician
- Esmeralda Seay-Reynolds, American model
- Frank Howell Seay (1938–2026), American jurist
- George Seay (born 1967), American businessman
- James Seay (1914–1992), American actor
- Joe Seay (1939–2019), American wrestling coach
- Johnny Seay (1940–2016), American country music singer
- Lloyd Seay (1919–1941), American stock car racing driver
- Mark Seay (born 1967), American football player
- SEAY (fl. 2000s–2020s), American vocalist and composer
- S.S. Seay (1899–1988), American activist, religious leader, and memoirist
- Sylvester Seay (born 1985), American basketball player
- Thomas Seay (1846–1896), American politician from Alabama
- Valencia Seay (born 1953), American politician from Georgia
- Virgil Seay (born 1958), American football player
- Vivian Seay (1881–1971), British Honduran nurse and activist
- Virginia Seay (1922–2015), American composer and musicologist
- William E. Seay (1921–2013), American politician from Missouri
- William W. Seay (1948–1968), American soldier and Medal of Honor recipient

== See also ==
- Governor Seay Mansion, in Kingfisher, Oklahoma
- Jammie Seay House, in Spartanburg, South Carolina
- Robbie Seay Band
- Seay Building at Centenary University, in Hackettstown, New Jersey
- Seay's Chapel Methodist Church, in Fluvanna County, Virginia
- Seay Hall at the Alabama A&M University, in Huntsville, Alabama
- Seay Auditorium at the University of Kentucky, in Lexington, Kentucky
- Seays, West Virginia, the former spelling of Teays, West Virginia
- USNS Seay, a U.S. Navy cargo ship
- W. N. Seay House, in Buena Vista, Virginia
- William Washington Seay House, in Wilson County, Tennessee
- Say (disambiguation)
- Sea (disambiguation)
- See (disambiguation)
- Shea (disambiguation)
