= Emel Say =

Turkish artist (1927–2011)

- Born: 1927
- Died: 17 February 2011 (aged 83–84)
- Known for: Painting
- Style: Miniature
- Spouse: Reşat Mursaloğlu (m. 1948; div. 1957)
- Children: 3

Emel Say (1927 – 17 February 2011) was a Turkish painter. She was the daughter of painter Zehra Say and the aunt of pianist Fazıl Say.

== Life ==
Emel Say was born in 1927. Her grandfather was a politician, who left the Committee of Union and Progress and opened a dance hall. Her mother Zehra Say was the first woman in modern Turkey to be married at an official wedding. Emel's mind was always on music. When she was fifteen, she received singing classes from Professor Carl Ebert, who had established the Ankara Conservatory. At first, Emel Say wanted to be an opera artist, but she changed her mind when she fell in love with a piece of land in Hatay, southern Turkey. She had to put her interest in music on hold when she married. Her husband Fuat Say, unlike the tolerance that Fuat Say had shown her mother Zehra, did not send Emel to school, nor was this really possible in Hatay at the time. Raising her three sons was the only thing she did until she divorced her husband when she was 30 years old.

After her divorce, her interest in music did not come to fruition; her mother got sick, so she had to focus on getting a job and income. She started her work life as the secretary of Fuat Bezmen. She worked for him for around ten years.

She worked in the United States for about five years.

When her mother, the famous painter Zehra Say, went into the later stages of Alzheimer's disease, she was no longer able to continue painting. Zehra made her daughter Emel promise to finish her painting Maui Adası (Island of Maui), which she had started to paint from a postcard Emel had brought back from a trip to Hawaii. She did not know how she could paint. At first, she cried but then she tried to paint and from that point on did not stop. She completed her mother's painting and it was displayed at an exhibition at the Çiçek Bar. There she was discovered by the sculptor Gürdal Duyar who at first asked what had happened to Maui Adası, and then when Emel told him that her mother had insisted she finish it, she tried at it. Duyar expressed to her that she was a natural talent and had been a painter within all along. If it was not for this reassuring encounter she may not have gone into painting at all in her life. She started painting after the age of 60.

Together with Duyar, who became a close friend of hers and other friends and family, she would often work on paintings and listen to music together late into the night. One of these nights, Duyar made a portrait for one of Fazıl's musician friends starting at midnight and finishing towards the morning as recalled by this friend of Fazıl's.

Say died in 2011.

== Art ==
She was a student in the studio of the painter Osman Özal. She, together with the other (former) students, would meet on Wednesdays at the İzmir Art and Sculpture Museum, and work in the studio there. They became known as the "Group Wednesday", and held collaborative exhibitions.

She and Duyar had exhibitions at the CEP Gallery in the time period between 1977 and 1990.

In 1995, her work, along with the work of Gürdal Duyar, was exhibited in the grand opening exhibition of the Asmalımescit Art Gallery.

=== Technique ===
She made many miniatures. One of the techniques she often used was using two different types of paint in the same painting, acrylic and gouache.

== Exhibitions ==
- Emel Say painting exhibition, Underground Art Gallery (till 20 May 1992)
- Asmalımescit Art Gallery grand opening exhibition (1995)
- Emel Say painting exhibition, Çatı Sanatevi (till 7 May 2000)
- Emel Say painting exhibition, Underground Art Gallery (till 21 May 2004)
- 9th exhibition, Çiçek Bar (till 18 December 2004)
- Mixed Exhibition of works by Osman Özals students, Dr. Selahattin Akçiçek Culture and Art Center in Konak, İzmir (till 15 April 2012) but extended?

== Friends and family ==
She is proud of how her mother, Zehra Say, even after her marriage, went to school and became an art teacher, which was quite an accomplishment at that time. She is also proud of her father Fuat Say for supporting his wife, her mother. Say's uncle's grandson, Fazıl Say, did make a career of his musical talent. When talking about him, she said that he is "A Genius!", "When he was just four years old, his mother had bought a small organ, like a toy... Fazıl started to play the songs on the radio with this organ. How many times could a composer the likes of him come to this Earth!"

She became friends with the poet and writer Gülsüm Cengiz around after her time in the United States. He was visiting her and Zehra at their home and they continued in conversation late into the night, and they learned about the 1960 military coup towards the morning after someone was banging on the door and they turned on the radio.

She was also close friends with Gürdal Duyar, and they had exhibitions together.

== Sources ==
- Cengiz, Gülsüm [in Turkish] (2014). Ağaçlar Çiçekteydi (in Turkish). Evrensel Basım Yayın. ISBN 6054834932.ISBN 9786054834938
- Yılmaz, İhsan (7 September 2022). "İdil Biret büstü nasıl bulundu" [How was the bust of İdil Biret found?]. Hürriyet.
