= Nusret Çolpan =

Turkish painter, architect and miniaturist (1952–2008)

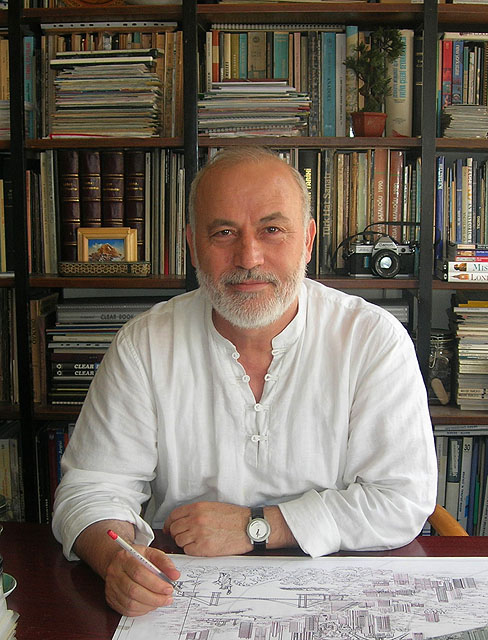
- Nusret Çolpan 2005
- Born: Nusret Çolpan; October 1, 1952; Bandırma, Turkey
- Died: May 31, 2008 (aged 55); Istanbul, Turkey
- Education: Suheyl Unver (Teacher), Yıldız Technical University, Architecture, Istanbul
- Known for: Painting, Drawing, Architecture

Nusret Çolpan (October 1, 1952 – May 31, 2008) was a Turkish painter, architect and miniaturist, renowned for his paintings in Ottoman miniature style depicting cities around the world, particularly Istanbul. He painted over 300 miniatures in his 30-year career.

== Life and work ==
Nusret Çolpan was born in 1952 in Bandirma; he attended high school in Zincirlikuyu Meslek Lisesi and worked as a waiter and at a newsstand. Çolpan's talent for painting was recognized before he moved to Istanbul. He became locally recognised for his microscopically detailed drawings of mosques on wooden spoons.

On the advice of Dr Suheyl Unver (to whom he was introduced by his uncle Ali Oztaylan) he studied in the department of architecture at Yıldız Technical University. There he was taught by Unver and Azade Akar, two of the leading authorities in Turkish illumination and miniature painting of the time.

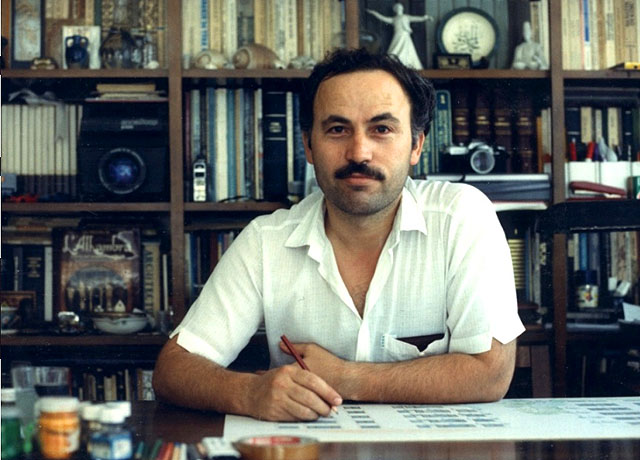
Nusret Colpan in the 80's

Subsequently, he worked on Ottoman illumination in a small atelier with his closest friend Semih Irtes in the Fatih district.

He travelled extensively in Europe and, after his return to Turkey, married Husniye Çolpan in 1979. In the same year, he opened a small interior decoration atelier, also in Fatih, and continued to paint. An interview with him was published in The Wall Street Journal in 1984. At the same time, his paintings started to be known and appreciated more widely.

He painted over 250 watercolor miniatures, mostly of cities, such as New York, Istanbul, Bukhara, Medina, Konya, and featured in many exhibitions until the year 1999. In that year he painted eight miniatures for the 700th anniversary of the foundation of the Ottoman Empire.

In 1999, on the occasion of the opening of the Istanbul Metro, he started to work at very large scales (over 20 meters) in collaboration with Iznik Foundation, producing many paintings on tiles. They are currently displayed in Beykoz Ferry Harbour, Kadir Has University, Ministry of Religious Affairs, Turkish Airlines, and overseas in Zabeel Park in Dubai, Canada, Thailand and Greece, making him known around the world. He continued to work into his last years. He also taught art in Cerrahpasa and at Yıldız.

Çolpan died of heart disease on May 31, 2008, in Istanbul.

== Art ==
Çolpan was inspired by Matrakci Nasuh, who lived during the period of Suleiman the Magnificent. Cities are the main subjects of most of Çolpan's paintings, but he also painted such subjects as Noah's Ark, the Battle of Preveza, the Fall of Constantinople and the Mevlana and Sema ceremonies.

Çolpan was notable for his use of spiral forms in many miniatures. He pioneered the painting of miniatures on tiles and in general revived the art of Turkish miniature painting after centuries of neglect.

== Awards ==
- Award of Turkey Ministry of Culture
- Award of Türk Kültürüne Hizmet Vakfı
- Mevlana Success Award
- Turkey Ministry of Foreign Affairs
- Türkiye Yazarlar Birliği Traditional Arts Success Award

== Exhibitions ==
Topkapı Palace

Press Museum

Atatürk Library

Municipality of Istanbul

Bandırma Art Center

Caferağa Medresesi

Cemal Reşit Rey Exhibition Hall

Tuğra Art Gallery

Ali Müfit Gürtuna Art Center

Kadir Has University

Taksim Art Gallery

Bursa Teyyare Culture Center
