= Ahmet Yakupoğlu =

Ahmet Yakupoğlu, formerly Ahmet Çalışel, (November 1920 – 2 October 2016) was a Turkish painter, ney player and Ottoman miniature and tezhip artist. In 1964, he changed his family name to Yakupoğlu.

== Biography ==
Yakupoğlu was born to Hacı Halil Ağa and Şefika Hanım in the Saray neighborhood of Kütahya in 1920. His interest in painting started when he was a child, observing picture books attentively. He started school in Derviş Paşa Elementary School in 1927. While still a student, he exhibited his paintings in art galleries. He had read all the books about the art of drawing and painting in the Vahid Paşa Public Library before he finished secondary school.

In 1941, he met Prof. Süheyl Ünver, who had come to the Vahid Paşa Public Library to carry out manuscript research. After graduating from Kütahya High School, he passed the entrance exam for the Mimar Sinan Fine Arts University without needing an interview. On the recommendation of Süheyl Ünver he studied in Feyhaman Duran's workshop at the Department of Paintings, and graduated from here in 1945. He learned Ottoman miniature-making, illumination, flute playing and musicology, from Süheyl Ünver and Ömer Halil Dikmen. After returning to Kütahya, he participated in museum studies as well as painting.

Yakupoğlu created approximately two thousand original paintings; half of them depict street scenes, recreation spots, old historical buildings and the people of Kütahya Province.

In later life he lived in İzmir with his adoptive daughter Havva Sökmener. He died on 2 October 2016 in Kütahya. On his death, he left his house, library and paintings to Dumlupınar University in Kütahya.

Because of his many talents and vast knowledge, he is sometimes called "the last Hezarfen" ("a thousand sciences" in Turkish), with reference to Hezârfen Ahmed Çelebi.

== Recognition ==
In 2010, he was honoured with the Distinguished Service Order of the Grand National Assembly of Turkey (Turkish: TBMM Üstün Hizmet Ödülü).

The Ministry of Culture and Tourism awarded hm the Grand Prize for Culture and Art (Turkish: Kültür ve Sanat Büyük Ödülü) in 2013. It was bestowed on him by the President of Turkey.
