= William Say =

William Say may refer to:

- William Say (MP for Camelford) (1604–c.1666), English politician and one of the regicides of King Charles I
- William Say (priest) (died 1468), English priest, Dean of the Chapel Royal and Dean of St Paul's
- William Say (MP for New Shoreham), English MP for New Shoreham (UK Parliament constituency), 1452
- William Say (MP for Hertfordshire), English MP for Hertfordshire (UK Parliament constituency), 1491, 1495
- William Say (engraver) (1768–1834), British printmaker
