= Said Salamat =

Said Salamat سعيدسلامات
- Village
- Location within Iran
- Coordinates: 31°25′12″N 48°58′56″E
- Country: Iran
- Province: Khuzestan
- County: Bavi
- Bakhsh: Veys
- Rural District: Veys

Population (2006)
  - Total: 285
- Time zone: UTC+3:30 (IRST)
  - Summer (DST): UTC+4:30 (IRDT)

Said Salamat (Persian: سعيدسلامات, also Romanized as Sa‘īd Salāmāt; also known as Sa‘īd, Salāmat-e Kūchak, Salāmat-e Kūchek, Salāmat-e Sa‘īd, and Salāmat-i-Kochek) is a village in Veys Rural District, Veys District, Bavi County, Khuzestan Province, Iran. At the 2006 census, its population was 285, in 49 families.
