= Zehra Say =

Turkish painter

Fatma Zehra Bilgin Say
- Born: February 18, 1906; Ankara, Ottoman Empire
- Died: December 16, 1990 (aged 84); Istanbul, Turkey
- Known for: Painting; First officially married Turkish woman
- Notable work: Maui Adası ("Island of Maui)
- Movement: Naturalism
- Spouse: Fuat Say (m. 1926)
- Occupations: Painter, art teacher
- Children: 2

Zehra Say (February 18, 1906 – December 16, 1990) was a Turkish painter and the first Turkish woman to be officially married under the 1926 Civil Marriage law. She is known as one of the pioneering women of Atatürk's Turkey for her modern look on women's equality. As an artist she is known for her paintings of nature, flowers and fruits. Her great love of nature reflected in her paintings as she depicted Istanbul in a different light. Her work is described as an realistic interpretation of nature. She is the mother of painter Emel Say and the great-aunt of pianist Fazıl Say.

== Life ==
Zehra Say was born in 1906 in Ankara as Fatma Zehra Bilgin. In 1925, she graduated from the İzmir Teacher School. After graduating from high school, she married the mathematics teacher, Fuat Say, on 18 February 1926. This was the first official wedding to, and Say therefore officially became the first Turkish woman to be married. They had two children together; Emel and Arkan Say.

After she was married, she continued her education at the Istanbul Fine Arts Academy (Turkish: İstanbul Devletlet Güzel Sanatlar Akademisi, İDGSA). She was educated in the atelier of Namık İsmail at the Painting Department of the academy, which she graduated from in 1929. After that, she became a painting teacher. While she was teaching painting at the İstanbul Cağaloğlu Girls' High School, she continued to study in the Decorative Arts Department of the Fine Arts Academy. She continued to teach art for 36 years, and between 1960 and 1970 went to the United States for some time to work on painting there.

Say did not open an exhibition for a long time, her first exhibition was in 1982 in Istanbul at A Galeri. She later had other exhibitions as well. These include ten personal exhibitions and many mixed exhibitions.

Due to Alzheimer's disease, she was not able to finish the painting titled Maui Adası ("Island of Maui"). She asked her daughter, Emel Say, who finished the painting for her. At that point, Emel Say was not a painter yet, however, she finished the painting and it was displayed at an exhibition where it was spotted by the famous sculptor Gürdal Duyar, who reassured Emel that she had done a good job, which may have started her career in painting.

Zehra Say died in 1990. She was the great-aunt of pianist Fazıl Say.

== Marriage ==
On 18 February 1926 when she was 20 years old and was already a teacher, she married her husband Fuat Say, also a teacher. The Turkish Civil Law on marriage was passed the day before on 17 February 1926. Their marriage certificate is written in old Turkish; Atatürk would introduce the new alphabet in 1928. The witnesses to the marriage where the deputy of Bolu and owner of the Kavaklıdere wine Tunalı Hilmi and the Deputy of Erzurum (Erzurum Mebusu) Mahmut Bey. This marriage is known as the first official marriage in the history of the Republic of Turkey.

The article on official weddings (Turkish: "resmi nikahla evlenilmesi") in the new Civil Law was prepared by the first Minister of Justice of Turkey Mahmut Esat Bozkurt.

The sculpture at the entrance of the Marriage Office at İzmir International Fair, depicting two doves, was erected in 2002 by the İzmir Metropolitan Municipality in honor of Zehra and Fuat Say for being the first officially married couple. The sculpture, which sits on a white marble foundation, is made from poured bronze and also depicts two interlocked wedding rings representing the unity of a woman and man in marriage. The sculpture was designed by the İzmir-born sculptor Bihrat Mavitan.

== Painting ==
Say is known for her depictions of Istanbul from a nature perspective. Her well known works, including mainly still life and landscape paintings, have been described as realistic interpretations of nature. Other Turkish artists in a similar field of interpretation include Şükriye Dikmen, Adnan Varınca Naile Akıncı, Şeref Bigalı, Cemil Eren, Kainat Barkan Pajonk, Muammer Öner, İbrahim Bozkuş, Oya Kınıklı, Fahrettin Baykal and Aysu Koçak.

== Recognitions ==
During his term as the Turkish Minister of Youth and Sport, Avni Akyol awarded Say with a plaque of recognition for her 50 year long service to Turkish art.

The 2016 documentary by Tarık Akan, Atatürk'ün Alev Çiçekleri, is about the reforms relating to women during the foundation of the Turkish Republic and follows the stories of the first generation of women of the Turkish Republic. It follows the story of Zehra Say among other women including Sabiha Gökçen, Muazzez İlmiye Çığ, Nüzhet Gökdoğan, Jale İnan, Halet Çambel, and Afet İnan during the early years of the Republic.

== Exhibitions ==
(An incomplete list)

=== Personal ===
- A Galeri, Istanbul (1982)
- Moda Deniz Kulübü Sanat Galerisi (Feb, 2 1985)
- Hobi Art Gallery, Istanbul (October 18-November 7, 1985) (5th)
- Tanak Art Gallery, Istanbul, (April 23-May 10, 1986)
- Sevgi ve doğa [Love and Nature], Tanak Art Gallery (December 1989)
- Sanatyapıṃ Atölye & Galeri, Ankara

=== Collaborative ===
- Yaratıcı Türk Kadınından Esintiler[Breeze of Creative Turkish Women], Atatürk Cultural Center (8 – 11 April 1987)
- 20. Yüzyılında İlk Yarısında Türk Kadın Ressamlarından[Turkish Women Painters of the First Half of the 20th century], Yıldız University Yüksel Sabancı Art Center (Apr, 21 1992)

== Sources ==
- GÜVENER, Yeşim (2015). EREN EYÜBOĞLU'NUN SANATI (MSc) (in Turkish). Istanbul: Mimar Sinan Fine Arts University.
