= Ottoman miniature =

Art form in the Ottoman Empire

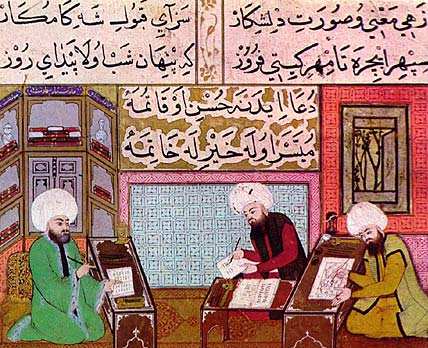
Ottoman miniature painters

Ottoman miniature (Turkish: Osmanlı minyatürü) is a style of illustration found in Ottoman manuscripts, often depicting portraits or historic events. Its unique style was developed from multiple cultural influences, such as the Persian Miniature art, as well as Byzantine and Mongol art. It was a part of the Ottoman book arts, together with illumination (tezhip), calligraphy (hat), marbling paper (ebru), and bookbinding (cilt). The words taswir or nakish were used to define the art of miniature painting in Ottoman Turkish.

While Ottoman miniatures have been very much inspired by Persian miniatures, Ottoman artisans developed a unique style that separated themselves from their Persian influences. Ottoman miniatures are known specifically for their factual accounts of things such as military events, whereas Persian miniatures were more focused on being visually interesting. The inclusion of miniatures in Ottoman manuscripts was more for the purpose of documentation, and less about aesthetics. Miniatures were used to demonstrate many important chronicles and themes, especially historical and religious events. Ottoman miniatures are particularly known for their specific and accurate details. This can be found in many miniatures of armies or court scenes.

Some Ottoman artists were more influenced by Persian miniatures than others. Ottoman miniatures with strong influences from the Persian style tended towards a more romanticized account of events, which strayed away from the more typical factual accounts of other Ottoman miniature paintings.

== Original procedure ==
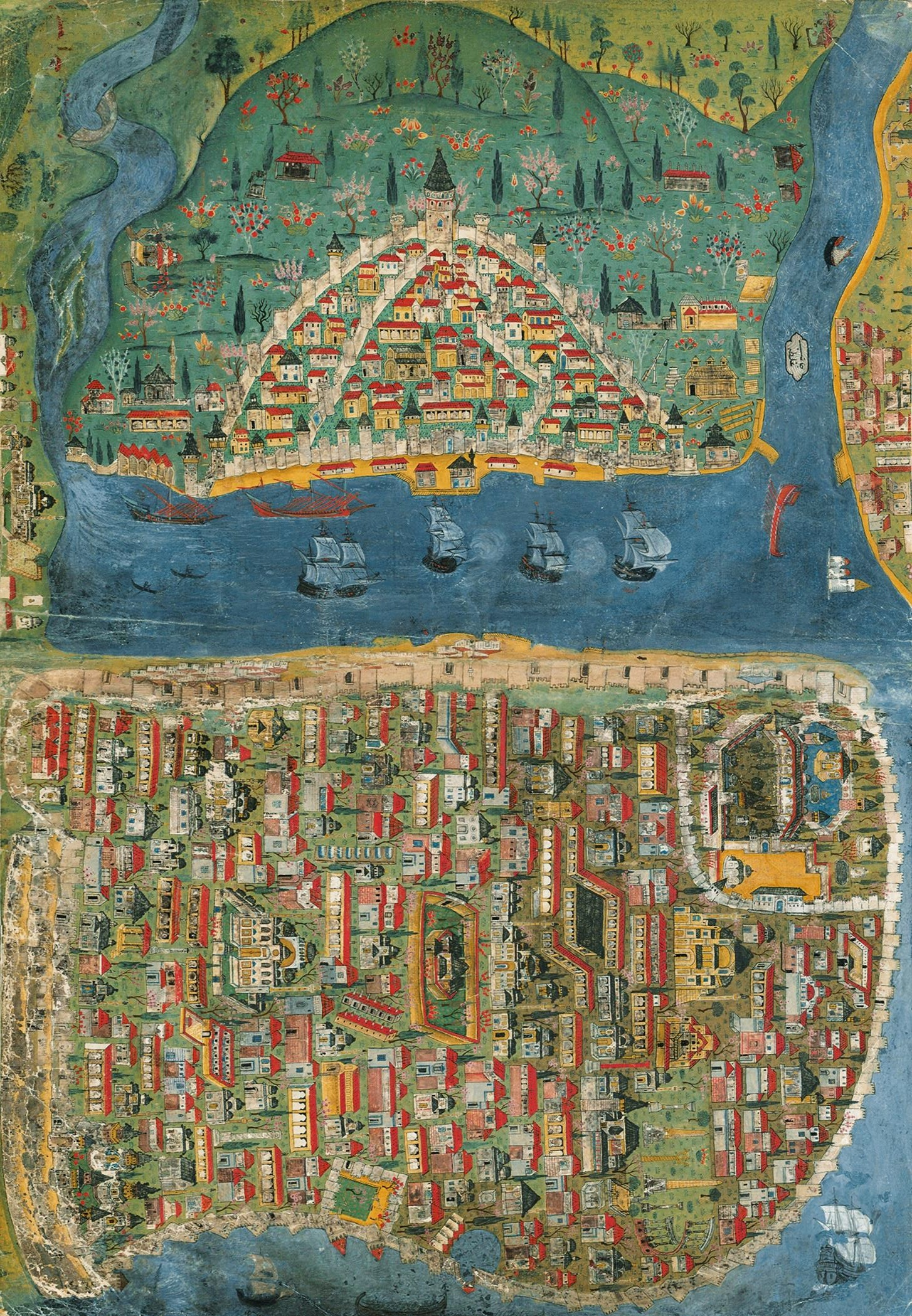
16th century map of Istanbul by the Ottoman polymath Matrakçı Nasuh

The head painter of the miniature typically designed the composition of the scene, and his apprentices drew the contours (which were called tahrir) with black or colored ink and then painted the miniature without making an illusion of third dimension. The head painter and the scribe of the text were named and depicted in some of the manuscripts, however the apprentices were not. In the thirteenth century, author portraits were very common in Islamic manuscripts. The portraits would depict the author of the manuscript as the largest figure, and would sometimes include other smaller figures that had contributed to the manuscript as well. At the end of the manuscript would be a colophon, which provided details about when the manuscript was completed and the author's name.

The colors for the miniature were obtained by ground powder pigments mixed with egg-white and, later, with diluted gum arabic. The produced colors were vivid. Contrasting colors used side by side with warm colors further emphasized this quality. The most used colors in Ottoman miniatures were bright red, scarlet, green, and different shades of blue.

The understanding of perspective was different from that of the nearby European Renaissance painting tradition. In many Islamic manuscripts, images depicted multiple perspectives, for example, both the inside and outside of a building could be displayed in one image. Additionally, miniature paintings were often used to articulate movement and time passing in a single image. Miniatures acted as illustrations to the text and utilized storytelling in their imagery which made them just as necessary as the text itself.

The Ottoman miniature painting tradition was unique in that artists did not strive to depict their subjects realistically. Some scholars believe that this style of painting developed from shadow puppetry, on account of the sharp geometric edges, as well as the intricate architectural designs. Additionally, the lack of third-dimensional shading and constant use of empty space suggest that shadow theater played a role in the development of Ottoman miniature painting.

== History and development ==
=== Early history ===
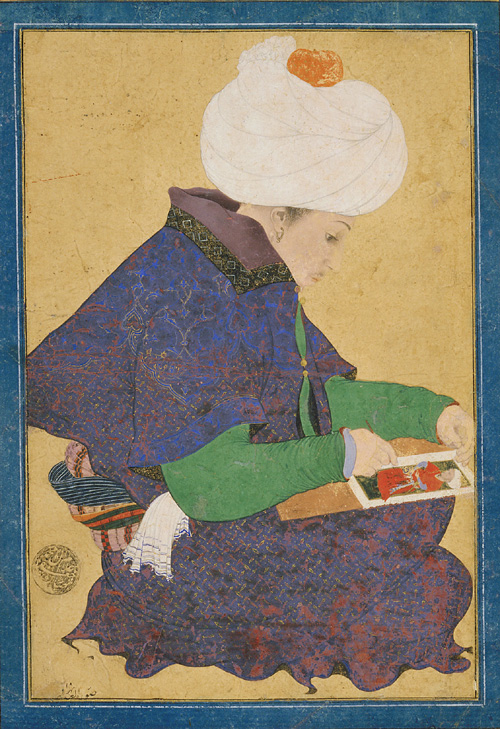
Portrait of a painter during the reign of Mehmed II

There is a relative lack of information about the book-making centers in the 15th century Ottoman Empire, but there is a record in the Ottoman Archives from 1525 that indicates a nakkaşhane (studio) in Istanbul. It references a complex hierarchical structure, which indicates that the studio had existed for likely 50 years before this record was written. This is not, however, to say that there is no evidence of production, for example: the existence of an album of calligraphy and drawings in 1481 also indicates a distinctly Ottoman studio in Istanbul. But there is no distinct evidence of illustration in the Ottoman Empire prior to the conquest of Istanbul in 1453.

The first indication of a flourishing school of painters laid out the fundamentals of Ottoman Miniature under Mehmed II in 1451-81 but there is much more evidence of productivity in the following reign of Bayezid II (1481-1512), and there are references to specific artists under his employment. The reign of Mehmed II (1451-81) is the first time that Ottoman miniature paintings are definitively created. It is worth noting that there is no archival documentation of the works, and the selection is rather limited. Esin Atil describes some of the miniatures executed during Mehmed's reign as "crude and provincial", resulting from a relative lack of examples, perhaps indicating a lack of illustrated books in imperial libraries.

For more information on painting under Mehmed II, see Nakkaş Sinan Bey.

The Safavid dynasty's stylistic and iconographic details had great influence on the style of Ottoman miniature painting. This is partially due to Selim I's conquest of Safavid Tabriz in 1514, in which he captured many manuscripts and brought them back to Istanbul, allowing the artists there to expand their iconographical and stylistic influence. Much of the illustrations in Ottoman manuscripts were constructed by referencing previous depictions of the subject, resulting in a heavy influence from past works. There were also some artists themselves moving from Tabriz and other cities in Iran to the Ottoman Empire.

The Nakkashane-i Irani (the Persian Academy of Painting) was founded in Topkapı Palace for imported Persian artists. The artists of these two painting academies formed two different schools of painting: The artists in Nakkashane-i Rum were specialized in documentary books, like the Shehinshahname, showing the public, and to some extent the private, lives of rulers, their portraits and historical events; Shemaili Ali Osman—portraits of rulers; Surname—pictures depicting weddings and especially circumcision festivities; Shecaatname-wars commanded by pashas. The artists in Nakkashanei-i Irani specialized in traditional Persian poetic works, like the Shahnameh, the Khamsa of Nizami, containing Layla and Majnun and the Iskendername or Romance of Alexander, Humayunname, animal fables, and anthologies. There were also scientific books on botany and animals, alchemy, cosmography, and medicine; technical books; love letters; books about astrology; and dream reading.

These early studios relied on the commissions of the wealthy and powerful, including governors, and even emperors. Massumeh Farhad argues that Mehmed II commissioned works in attempts to achieve immortality as influenced by extensive contact with the Italians.

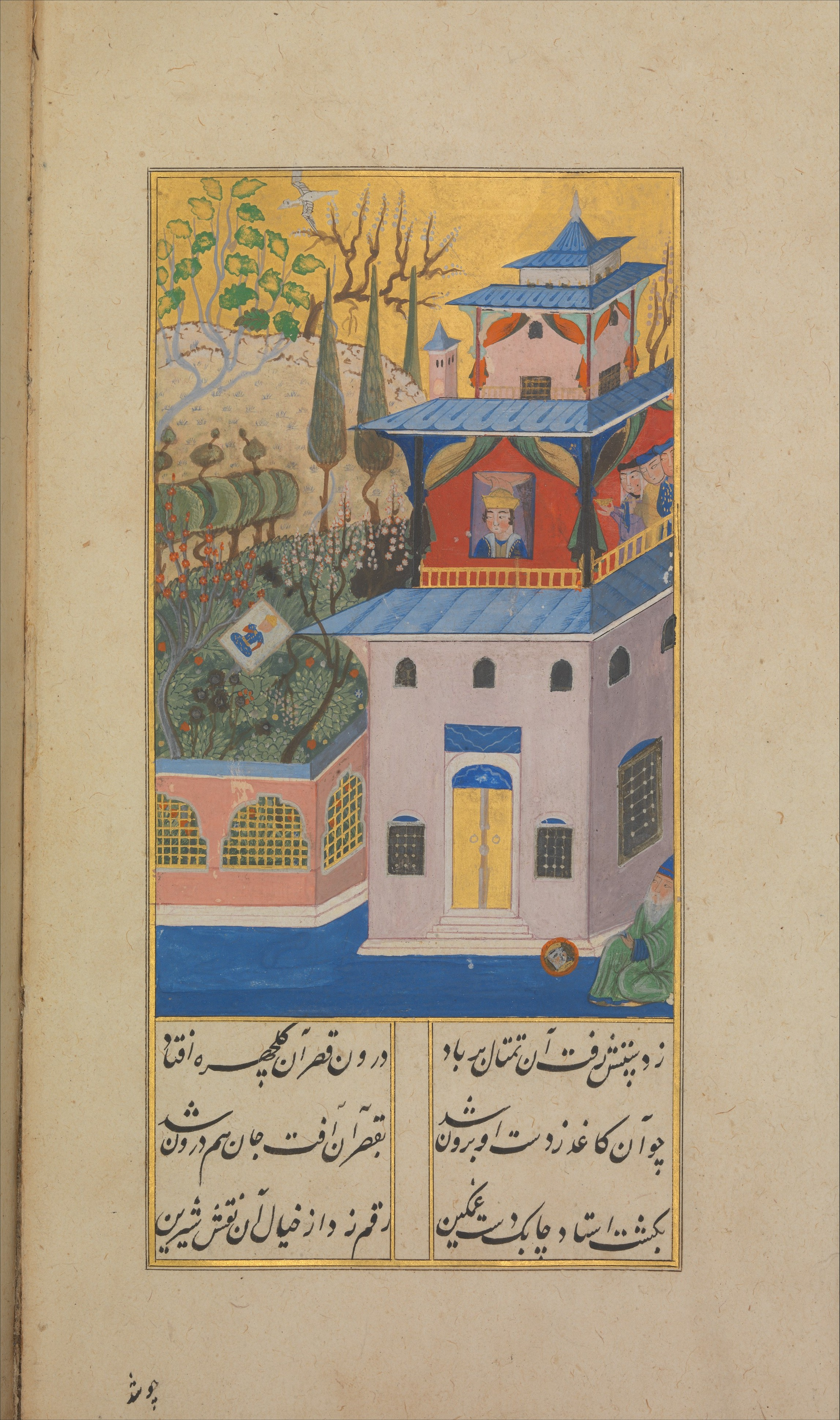
Scene from Hatefi's Khusrau & Shirin (painted by Suzi, 1498-99)

Frontispiece to a copy of Hatefi's Khusrau & Shirin (illustrations by Suzi, 1498-99)

Frontispiece to the Suleymanname of Uzun Firdausi (reign of Bayezid II)

=== Emergence of Imperial Style ===
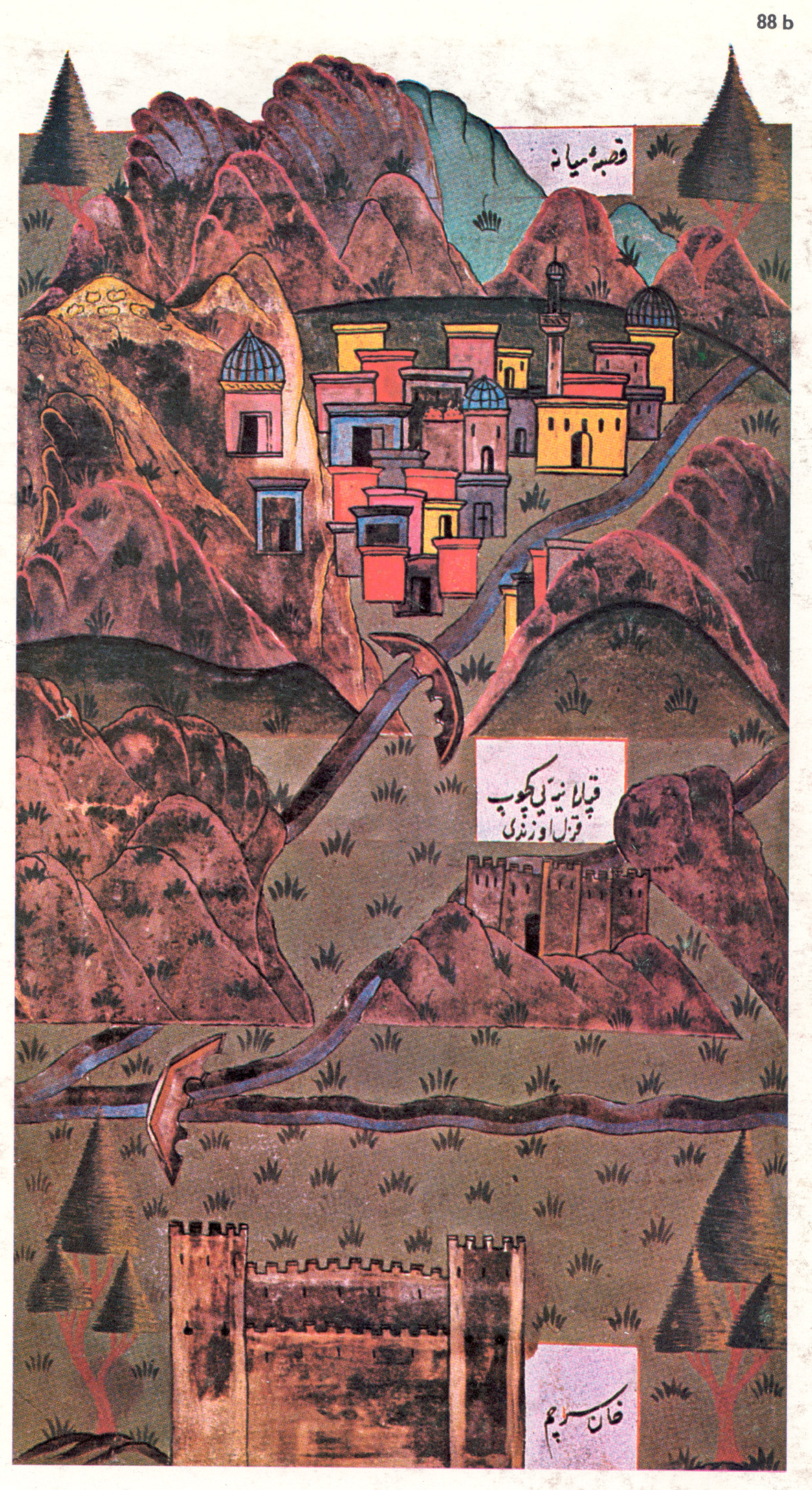
16th century map of Miyaneh by Matrakçı Nasuh

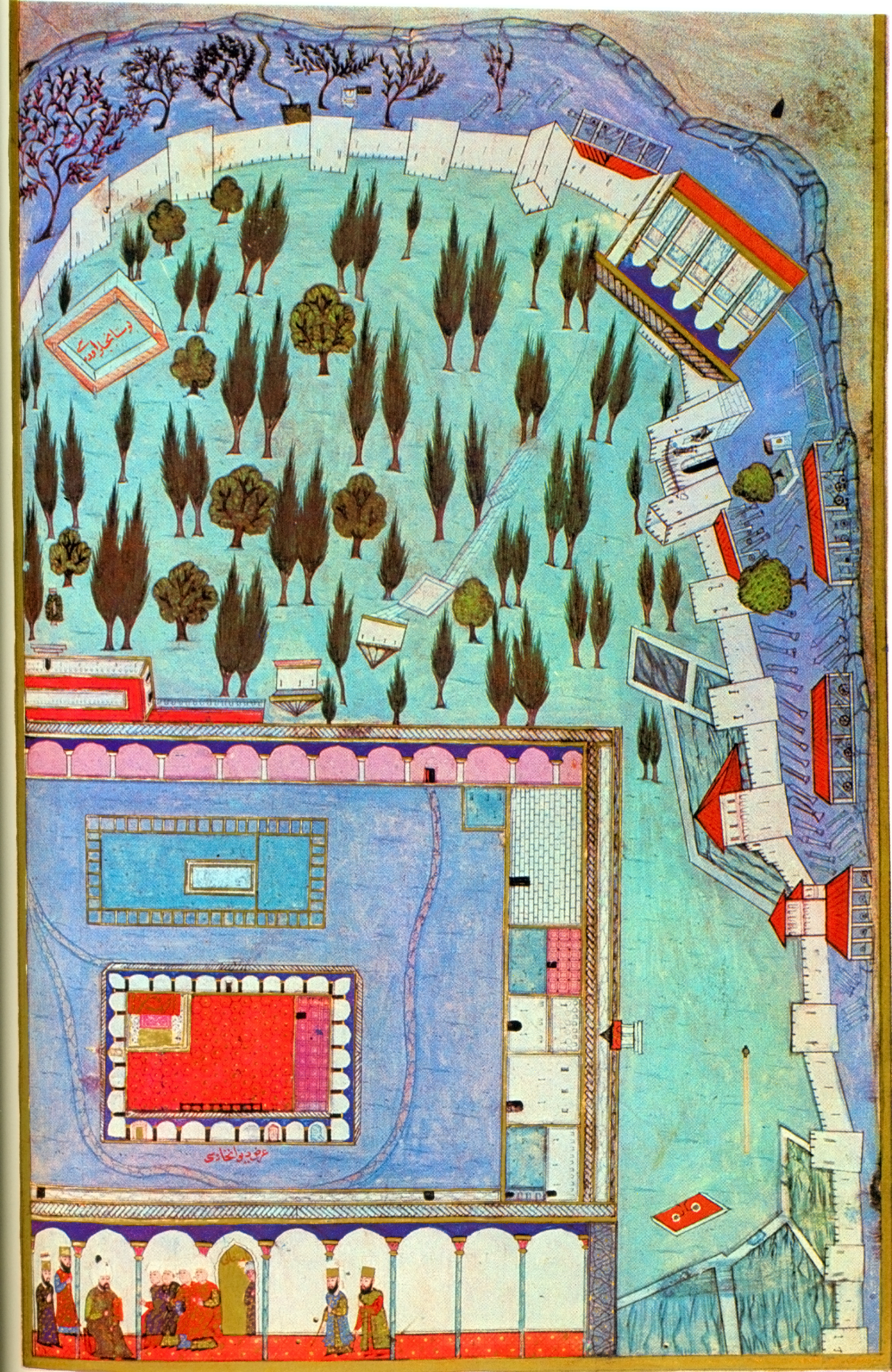
Topkapı Palace during the reign of Selim I

During the 1520s, the Ottoman miniature style settled, as exemplified by the Selimnâme, which was completed in 1524 and chronicled Sultan Selim 1's life, and contains contemporary costumes and events. In 1527 there were 29 miniaturists in the Ottoman Court Archives.

Two miniaturists aided in this development, Nakkaş Osman, and Matrakçı Nasuh. Nakkaş Osman seems to have exemplified the Ottoman visual language of miniature in the mid 1500s, which was characterized by a move away from Italian visual style towards the East. Matrakçı Nasuh was a famous miniature painter during the reigns of Selim I and Suleyman the Magnificent. In his work on Beyan-i Menazil-i Sefer-i Irakeyn-i Sultan Suleyman (Description of the stages of the campaign of Sultan Suleyman in the two Iraqs), c. 1537 (Istanbul University Library 5967), he created a new painting genre called topographic painting. He painted cities, ports, and castles without any human figures and combined scenes observed from different viewpoints in one picture.

During the reigns of Selim II (1566–1574) and Murad III (1574–1595), the classical Ottoman miniature style was created. The renowned miniature painters of the period were Nakkaş Osman, Ali Çelebi, Molla Kasım, Hasan Pasha, and Lütfi Abdullah.

Ottoman miniatures reached their peak in the last half of the 1500s, and compositions were largely based on the established representations in miniature, utilizing a 'vocabulary'. This style was partly characterized by a focus on everyday life, a relatively limited palette, bright colors, high levels of detail, and minimal use of the 3/4 perspective. By 1557 the number of miniaturists recorded in the Ottoman court increased to 35.

Near the end of the 16th century (1590), Baghdad's school of painting was flourishing. After the Mongols sacked the city it stopped being a center of illustrated book production, but it re-emerged as such in 1590 and there was a greater focus on everyday activities than in other locations. Not only was there a move away from fantastical depictions, but also from royal contexts, and many miniatures focused instead on daily life of lower classes as a result.

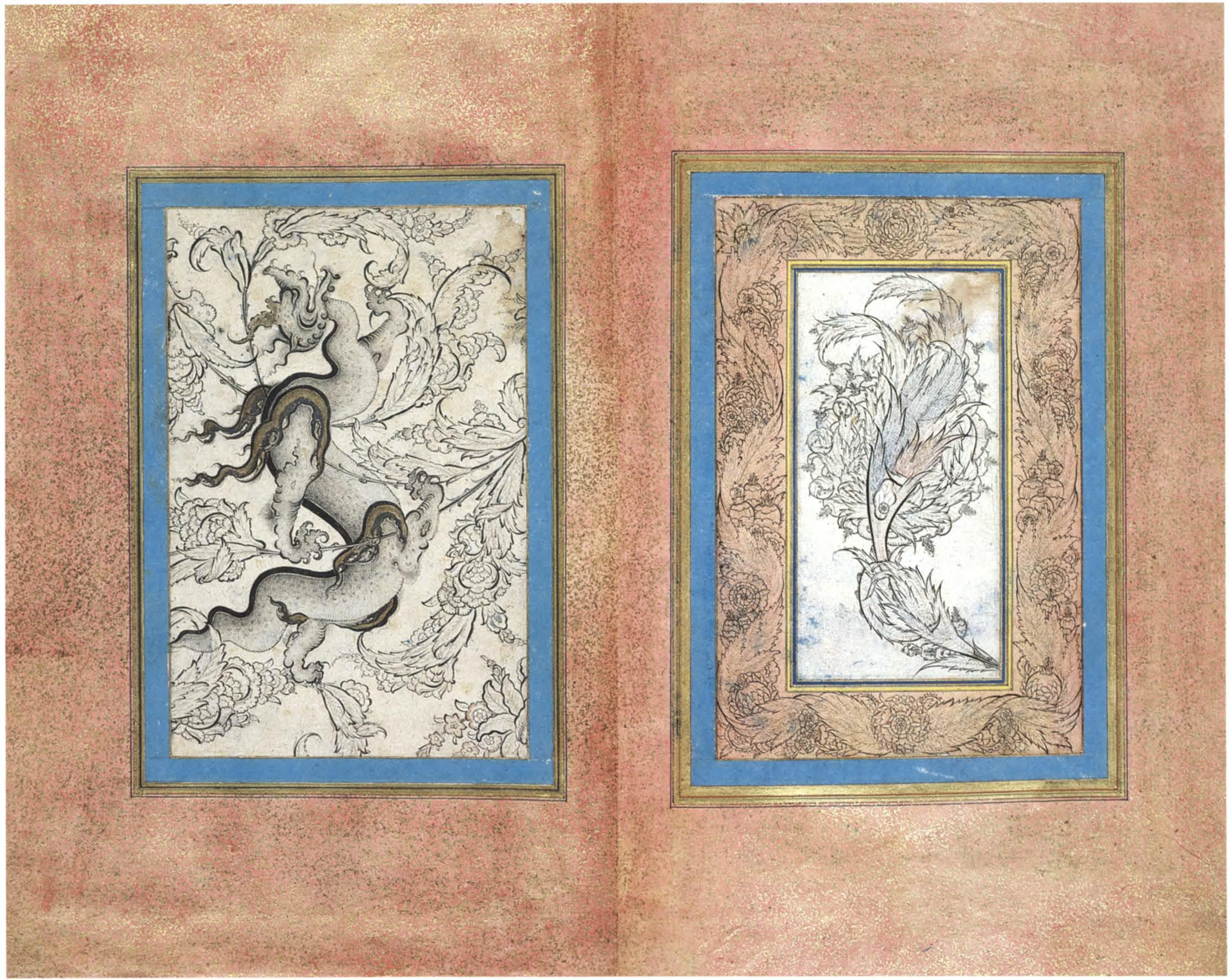
Dragon and hatayi blossoms in saz style (possibly by Şahkulu, mid-16th century)

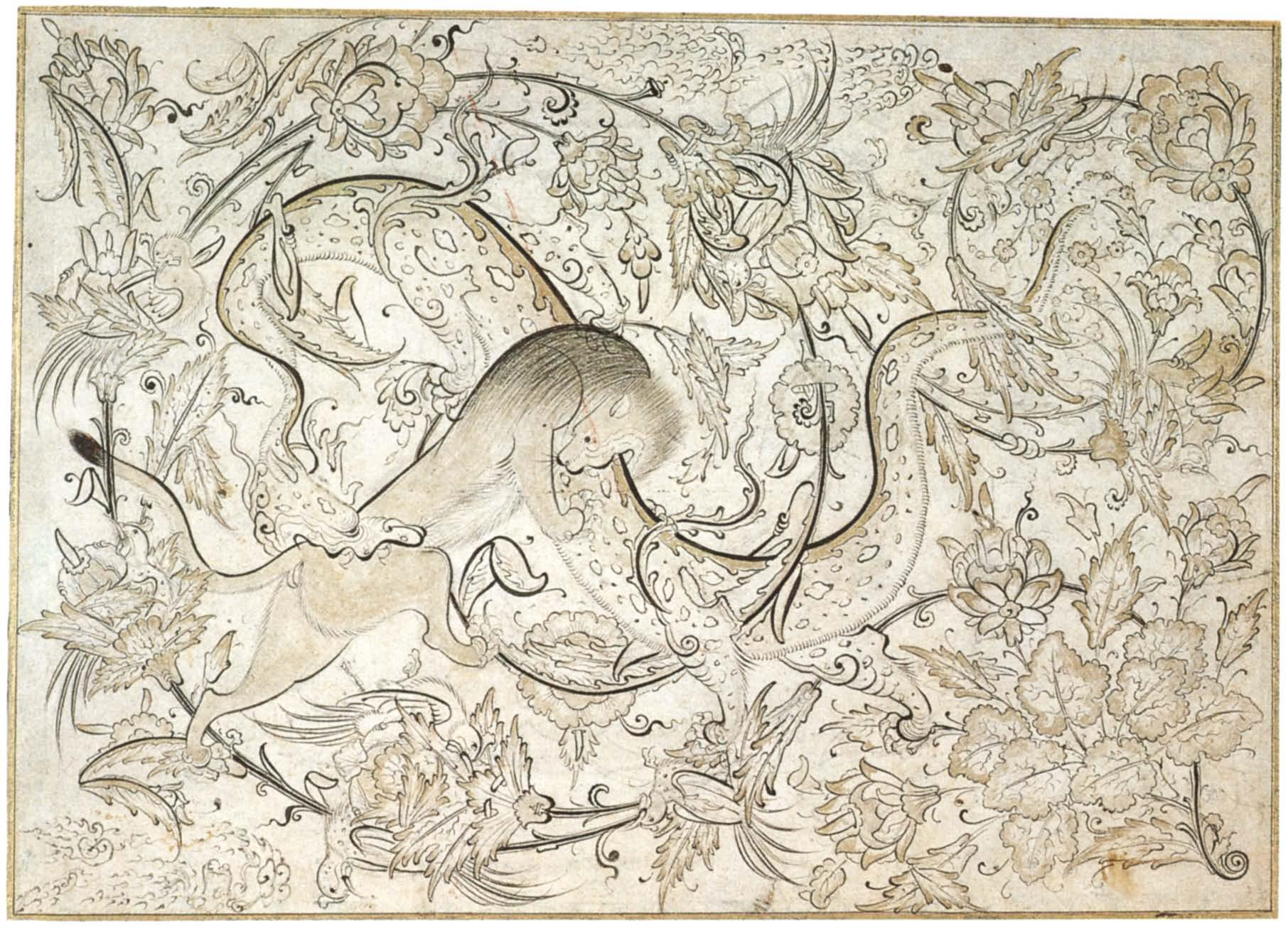
Combat between dragon & lion (attr Şahkulu)

=== Later shifts ===
In the 17th century, miniature painting was also popular among the citizens of Istanbul. Artists known as bazaar painters" (Turkish: çarşı ressamları) worked with other artisans in the bazaars of Istanbul at the demand of citizens.

Begüm Özden Firat suggests a shift away from imperial commission after the 18th century in his book "Encounters with the Ottoman Miniature". She says this was at least partly because of miniaturists in Istanbul who did not have to answer to the same constraints as imperially commissioned miniaturists, the expansion of materials available, the establishment of murakkas (a type of album which contained a wide variety of examples of a genre) of miniatures, and the rise of new miniature painting schools.

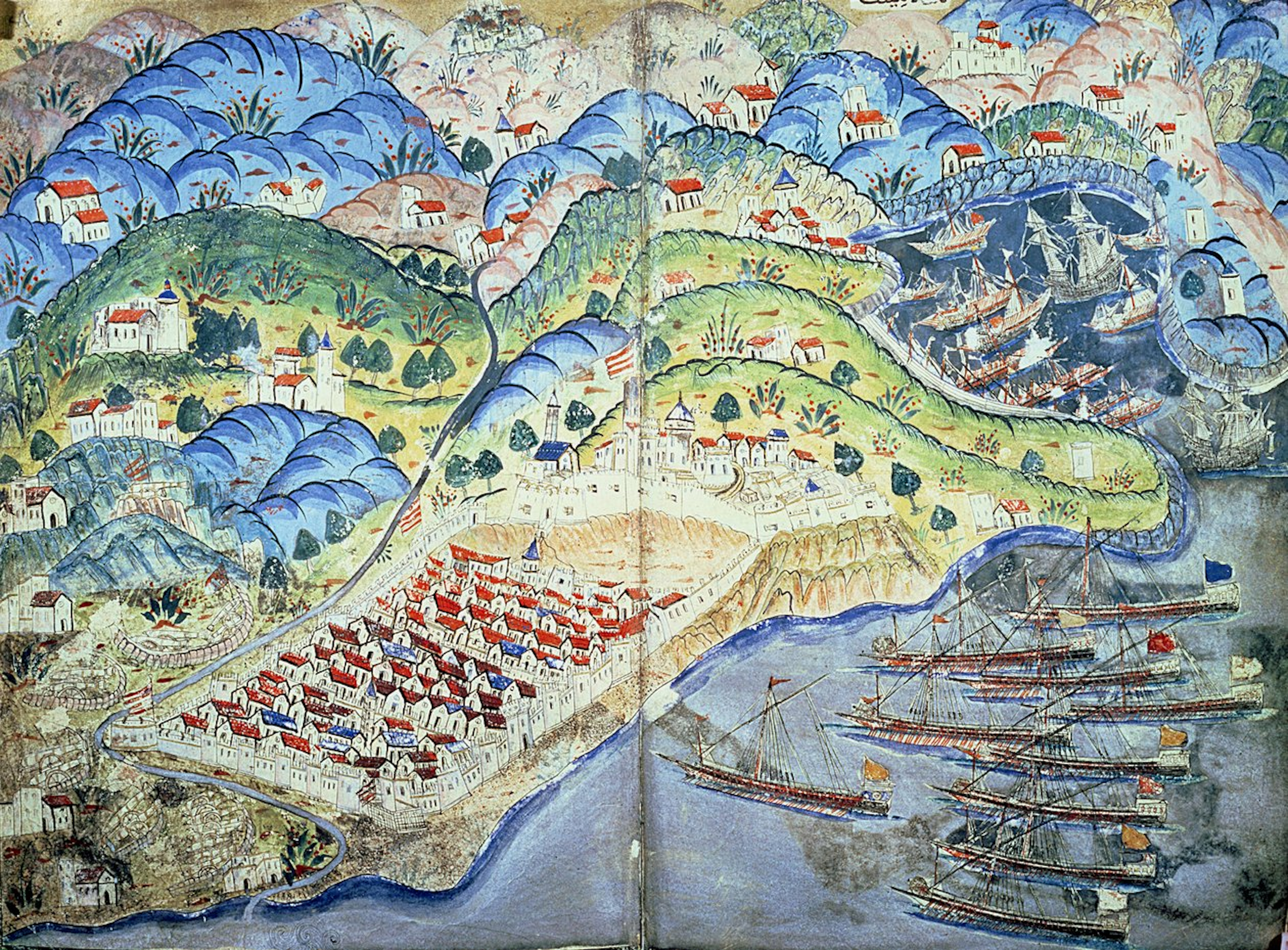
Siege of Nice (1543) by Matrakçı Nasuh

Matrakçı Nasuh, born in the Bosnian town of Visoko, was a Janissary who went through both the infantry and the devşirme system. He was a swordsman and sharpshooter who spoke five languages and was recruited into the Ottoman Navy.

Because of interactions with Europe (an increasing interest in European art and architecture) in the 18th century, methods and subjects of miniature painting changed. For example, artists began to utilize watercolor as opposed to the traditional gum arabic mixed with pigment. By the end of the 18th century, landscapes and oil portraits on canvas usurped the miniature as the dominant art form. Because of contact with Italy, the basic elements of Renaissance portraiture, such as portraying the whole body, volume in the torso, and shading of the face begin to be reflected in paintings from Istanbul. In the 18th century, the greater Western influence shifted the focus to one that was more subjective, to art rather than documentation.

A new cultural genre known in Ottoman history as the Tulip period occurred during the reign of Ahmed III. Some art historians attribute the birth of the unique style called Ottoman Baroque to this period. The characteristics of the period carried the influences of French baroque.

Abdülcelil Celebi, better known as Levni was a prominent painter during the 18th century, and exemplifies some of these shifts. Maryam Mesinch refers to the Sürname-i Vehbi as Levni's masterpiece, made to record the "circumcision feast of the sons of Sultan Ahmet III". Artisans, theatre groups, clowns, musicians, trapeze dancers, and citizens joined in the festivities.

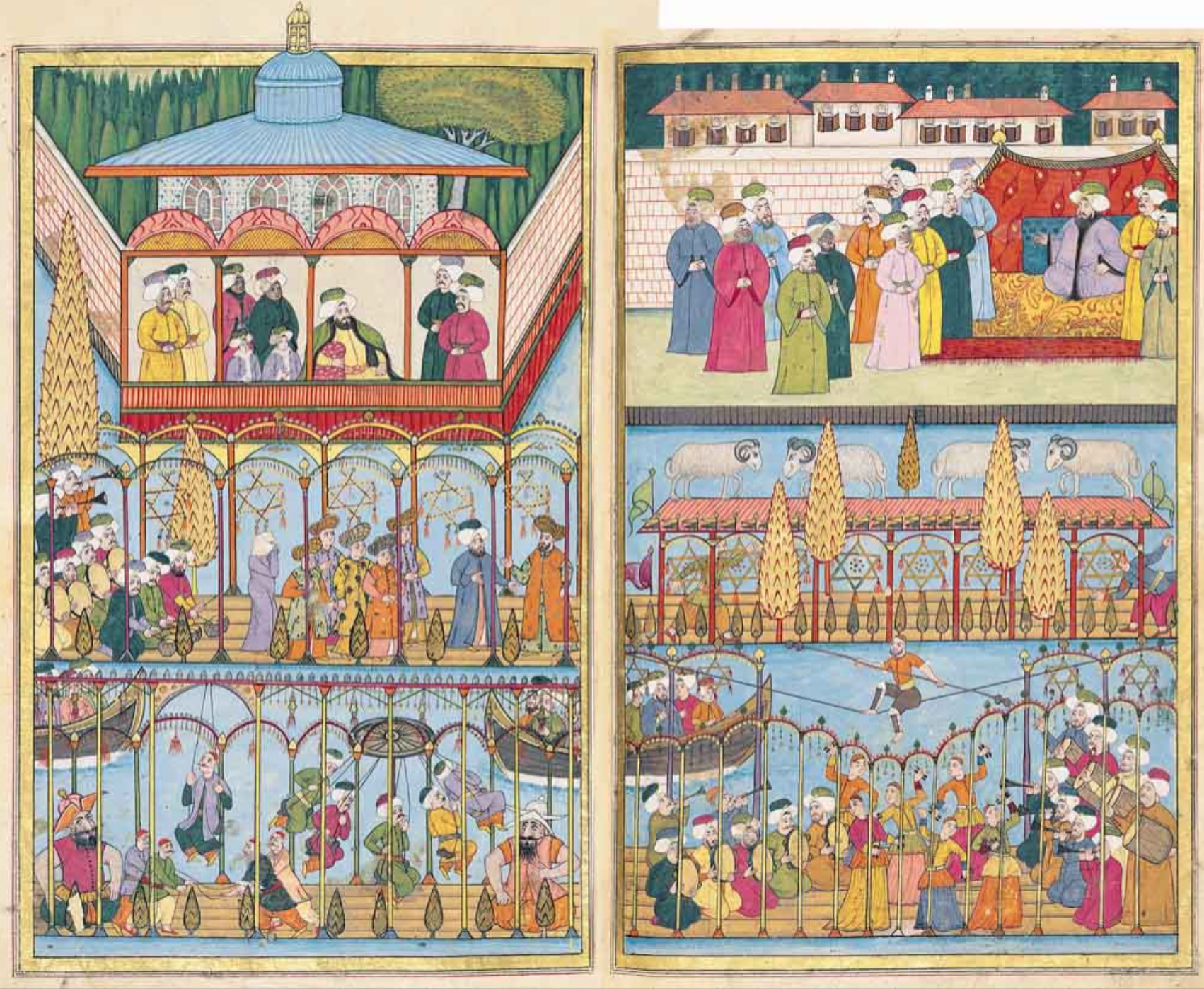
Scene from the Surname-ı Hümayun (Abdulcelil Levni, ca 1720)

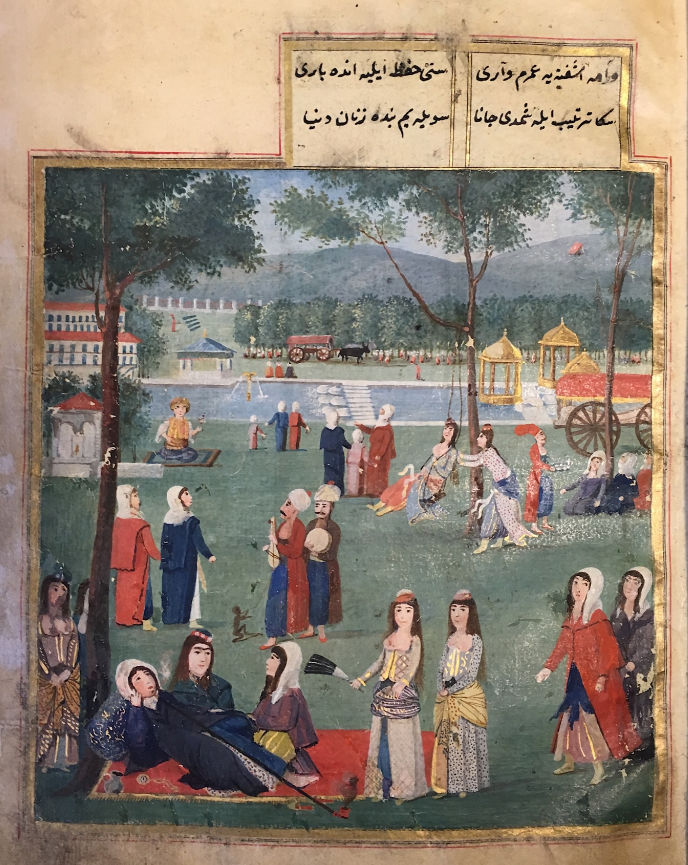
Sadabad gardens (from a copy of Zenanname), ca 1793

Locals Confront Woman (between 1799-1817)

=== Changing Function ===
After Levni, Westernization of Ottoman culture continued, and with the introduction of printing press and later photography, fewer illustrated were produced. From then on, wall paintings or oil paintings on cloth were popular. The miniature painting's function thus changed.

=== Contemporary Turkish miniature ===
After a period of crisis in the beginning of the 20th century, miniature painting was accepted as a decorative art by the intellectuals of the newly founded Turkish Republic, and in 1936, a division called Turkish Decorative Arts was established in the Academy of Fine Arts in Istanbul, which included miniature painting together with the other Ottoman book arts. The historian and author Süheyl Ünver educated many artists following the tradition of Ottoman book arts.

Contemporary miniature artists include Ömer Faruk Atabek, Sahin Inaloz, Cahide Keskiner, Gülbün Mesara, Nur Nevin Akyazıcı, Ahmet Yakupoğlu, Nusret Çolpan, Orhan Dağlı, and many others from the new generation. Contemporary artists usually do not consider miniature painting as merely a decorative art but as a fine art form. Different from the traditional masters of the past, they work individually and sign their works. Also, their works are not illustrating books, as was the case with the original Ottoman miniatures, but are exhibited in fine art galleries.

== Gallery ==
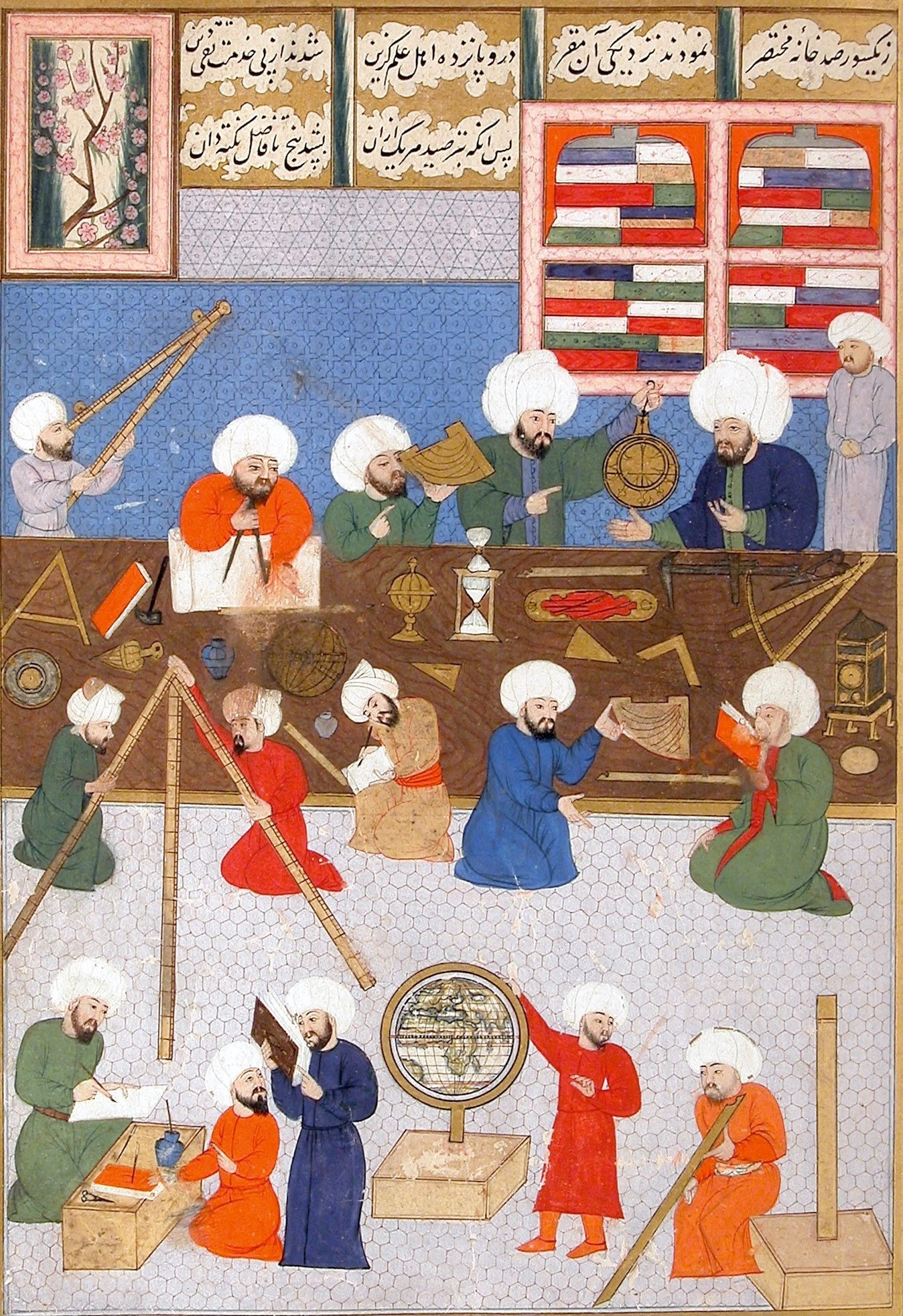
Ottoman astronomers at work around Taqī al-Dīn at the Istanbul Observatory

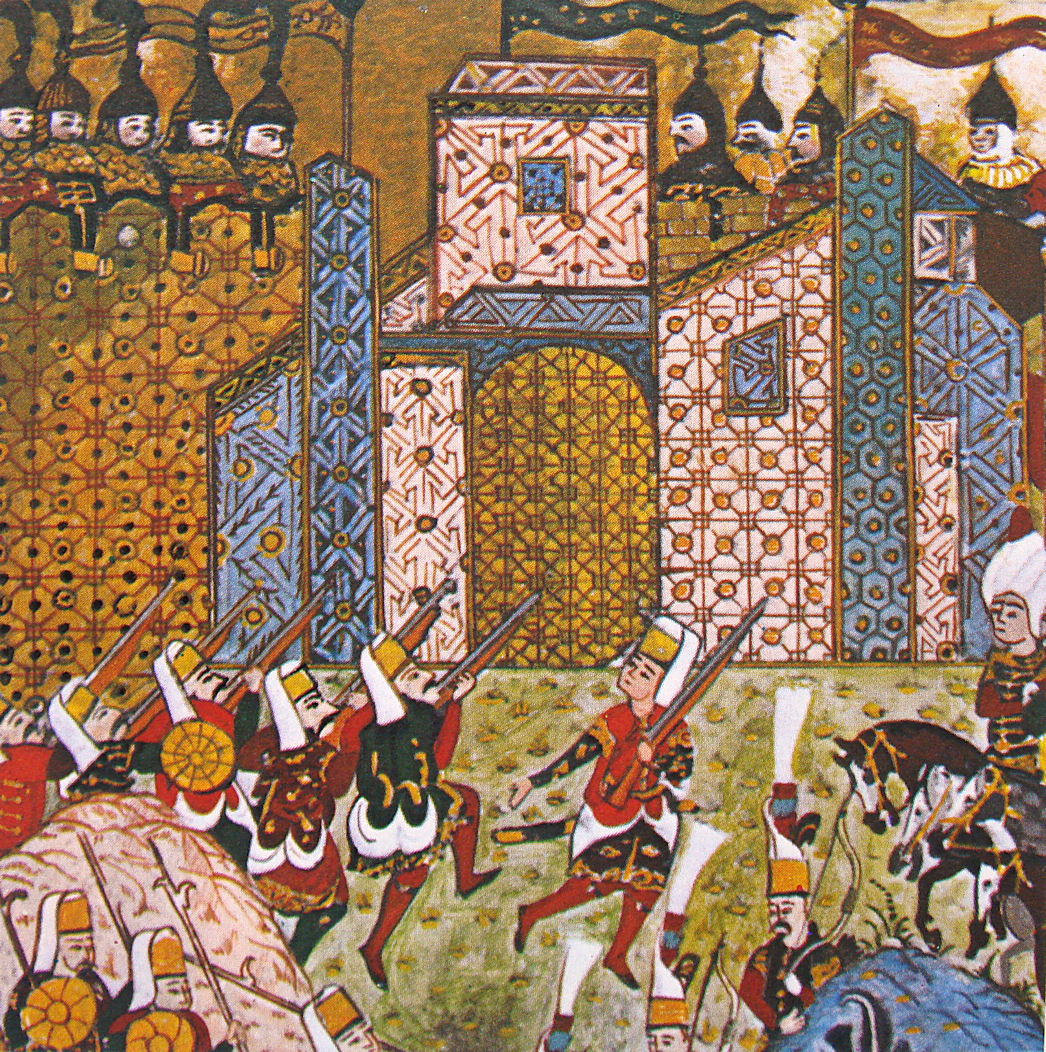
Ottoman Janissaries and the defending Knights of St. John during the Siege of Rhodes (1522)

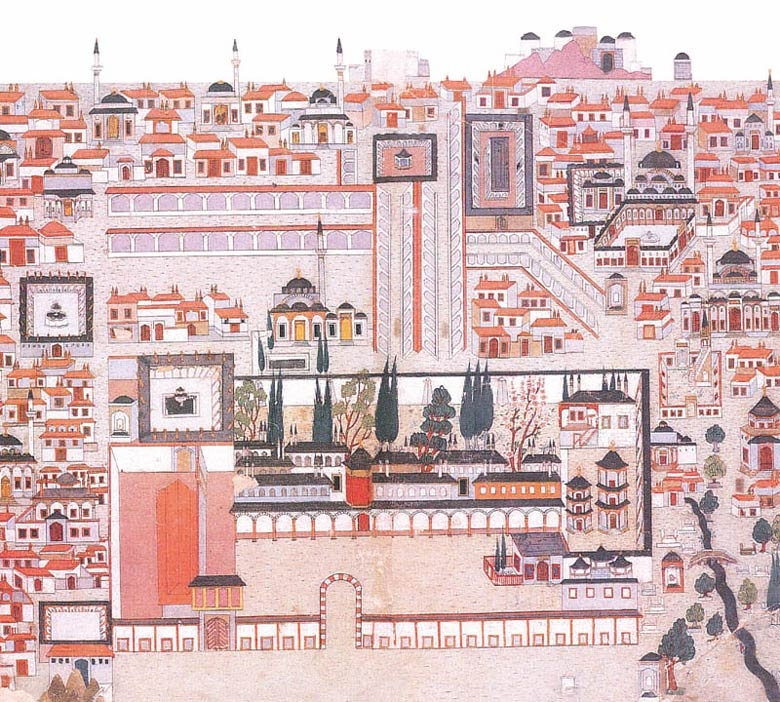
The city of Manisa, with the Manisa Palace built by Sultan Murad II

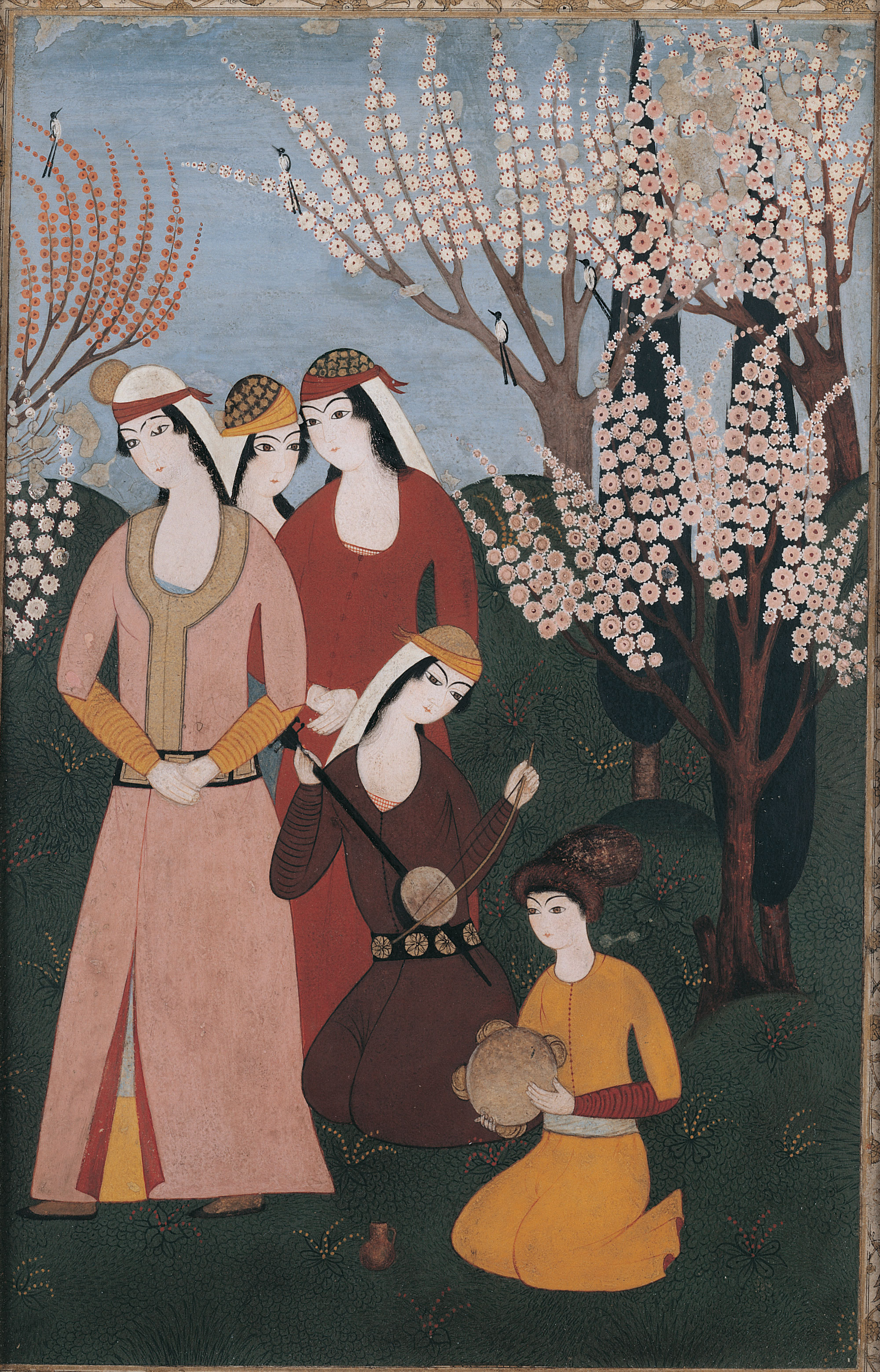
A Musical Gathering, Ottoman, 18th century

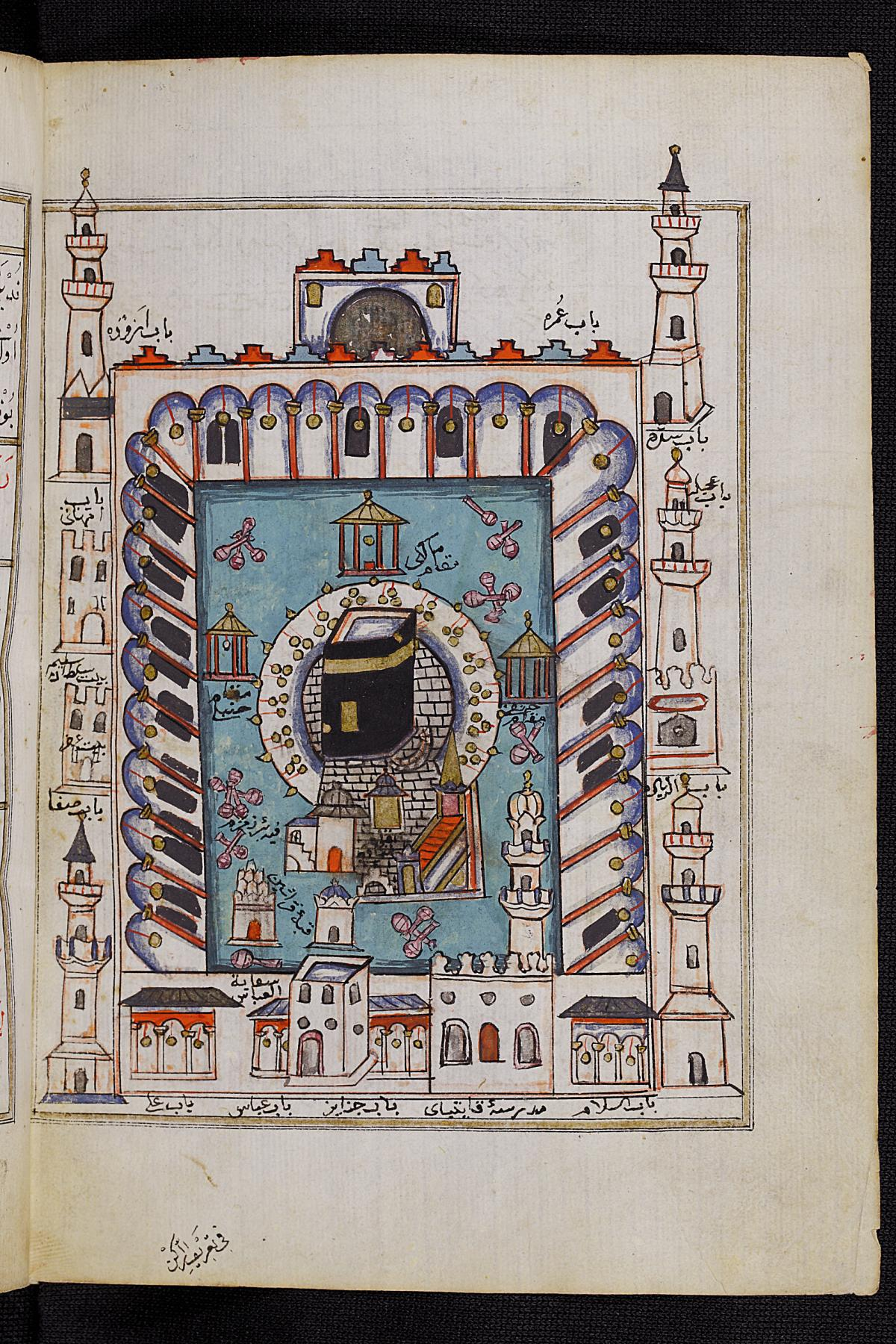
The Masjid al-Haram in Mecca depicted in the Kitāb-i Menāsik-i Hajj (1646)

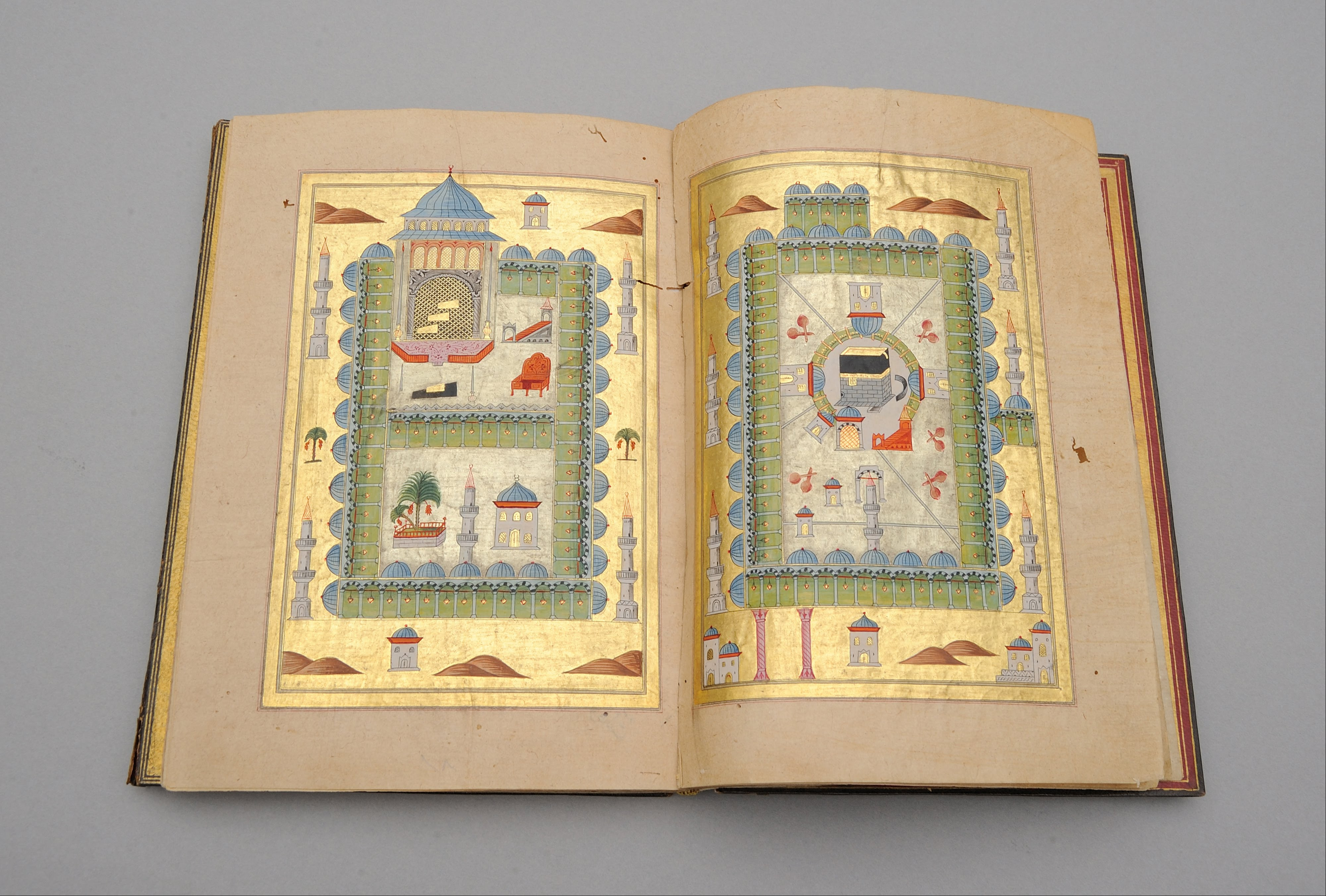
The Dala'il al-Khayrat of Muhammad al-Jazuli (Ottoman manuscript from 1801)

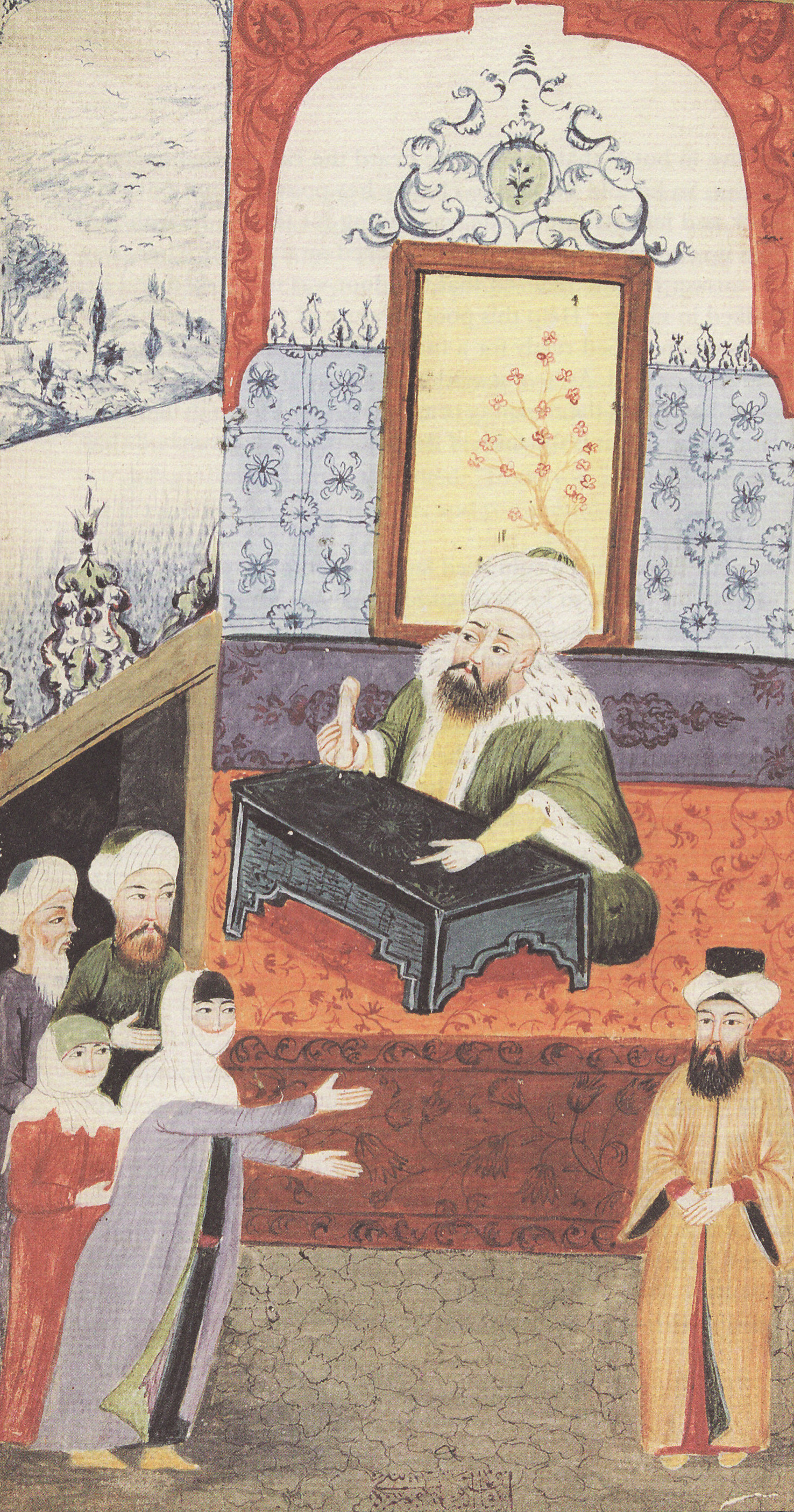
An unhappy wife is complaining to the Kadi about her husband's impotence

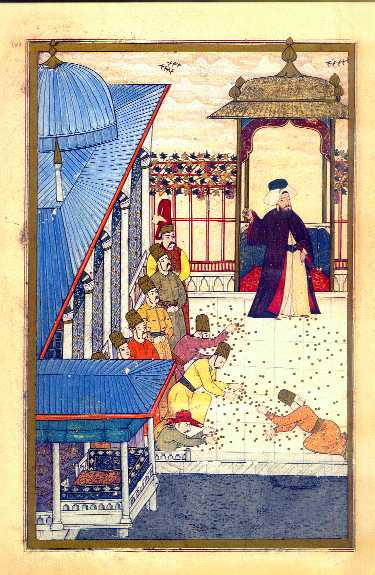
The Sultan strews gold coins, Surname-i Hümayun (16th century)

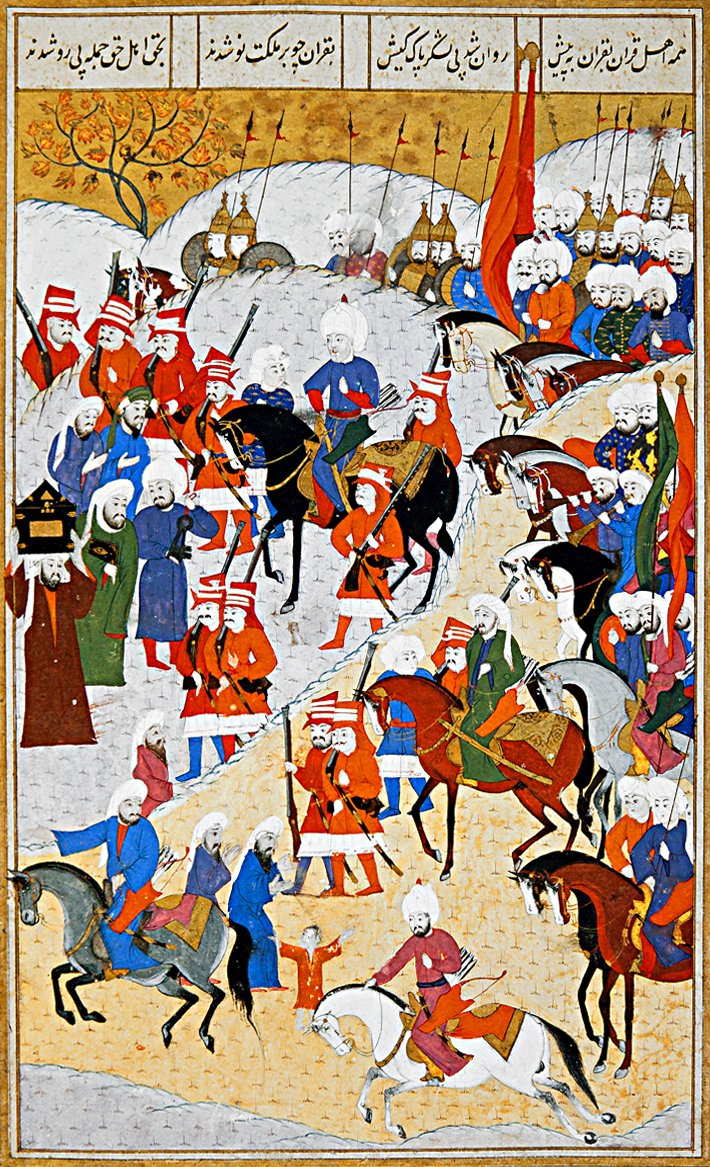
Ramazan Pasha, Beylerbeyi of Ottoman Algeria (16th century)

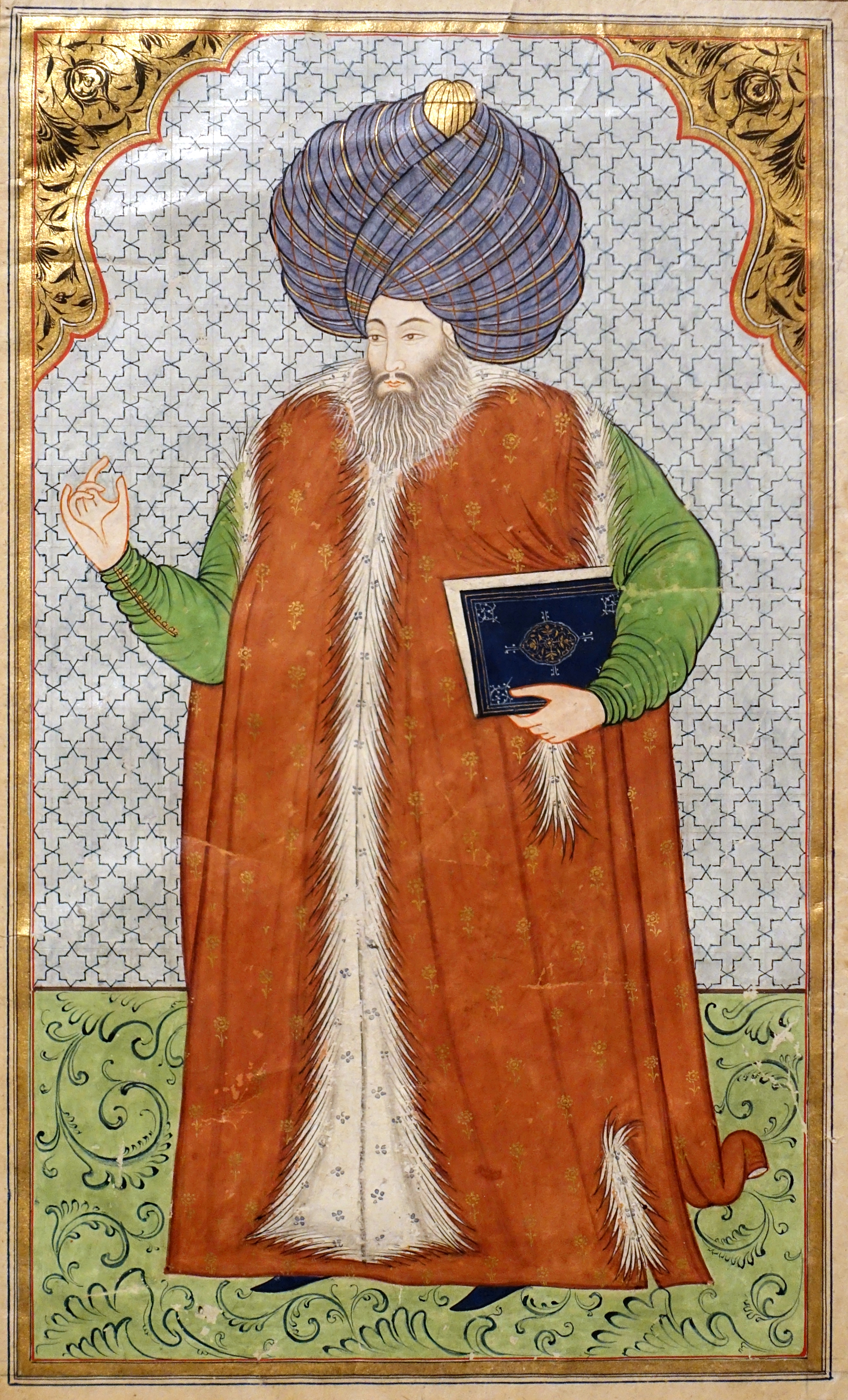
Ottoman official, Turkey, Istanbul, c. 1650

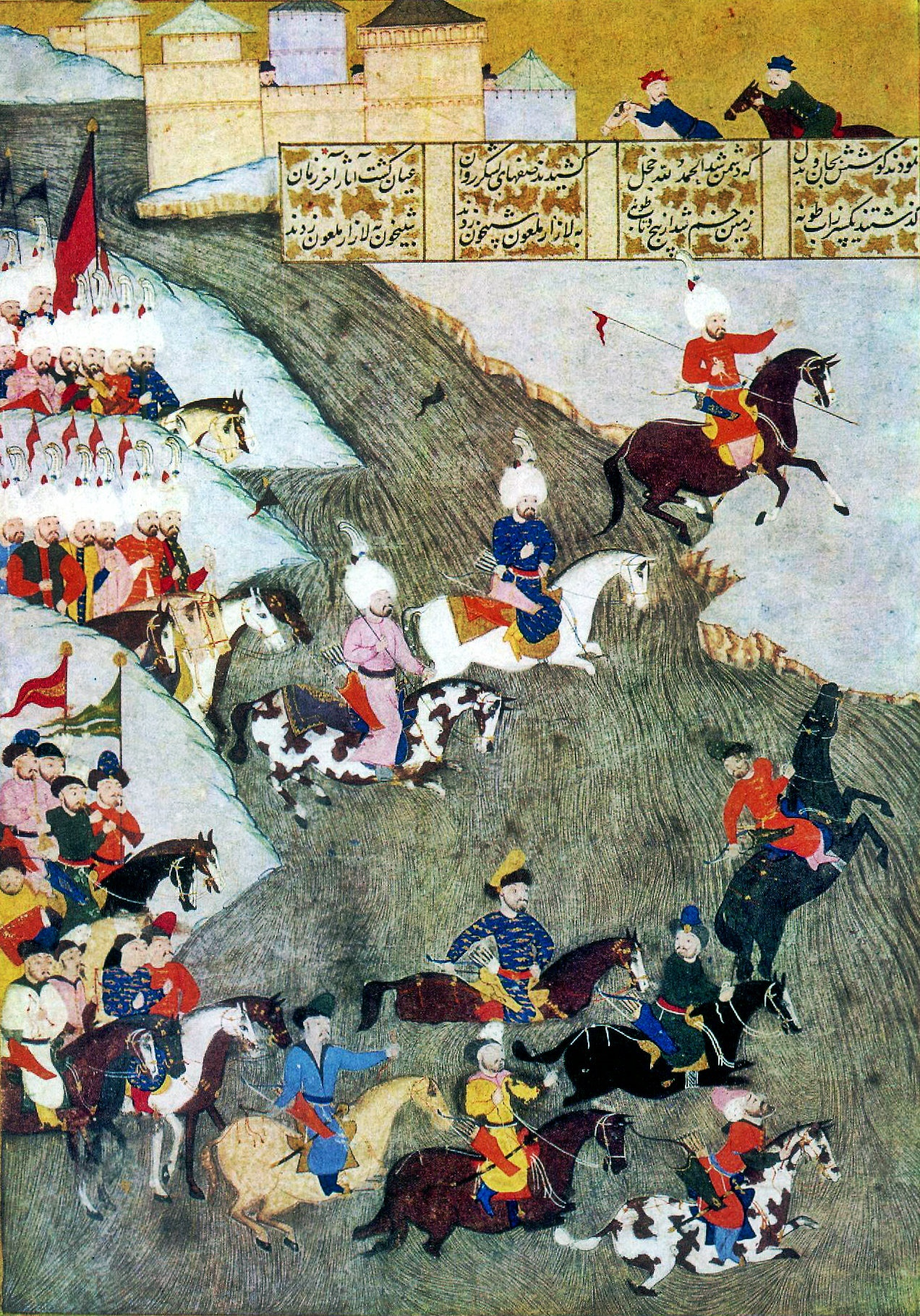
Siege of Szigetvár (1566)

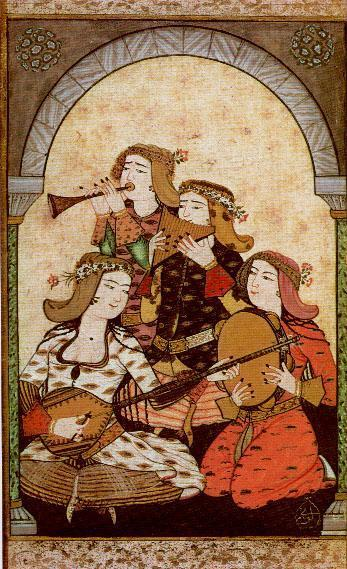
Female musical players, from the Surname-i Vehbi (c. 1720)

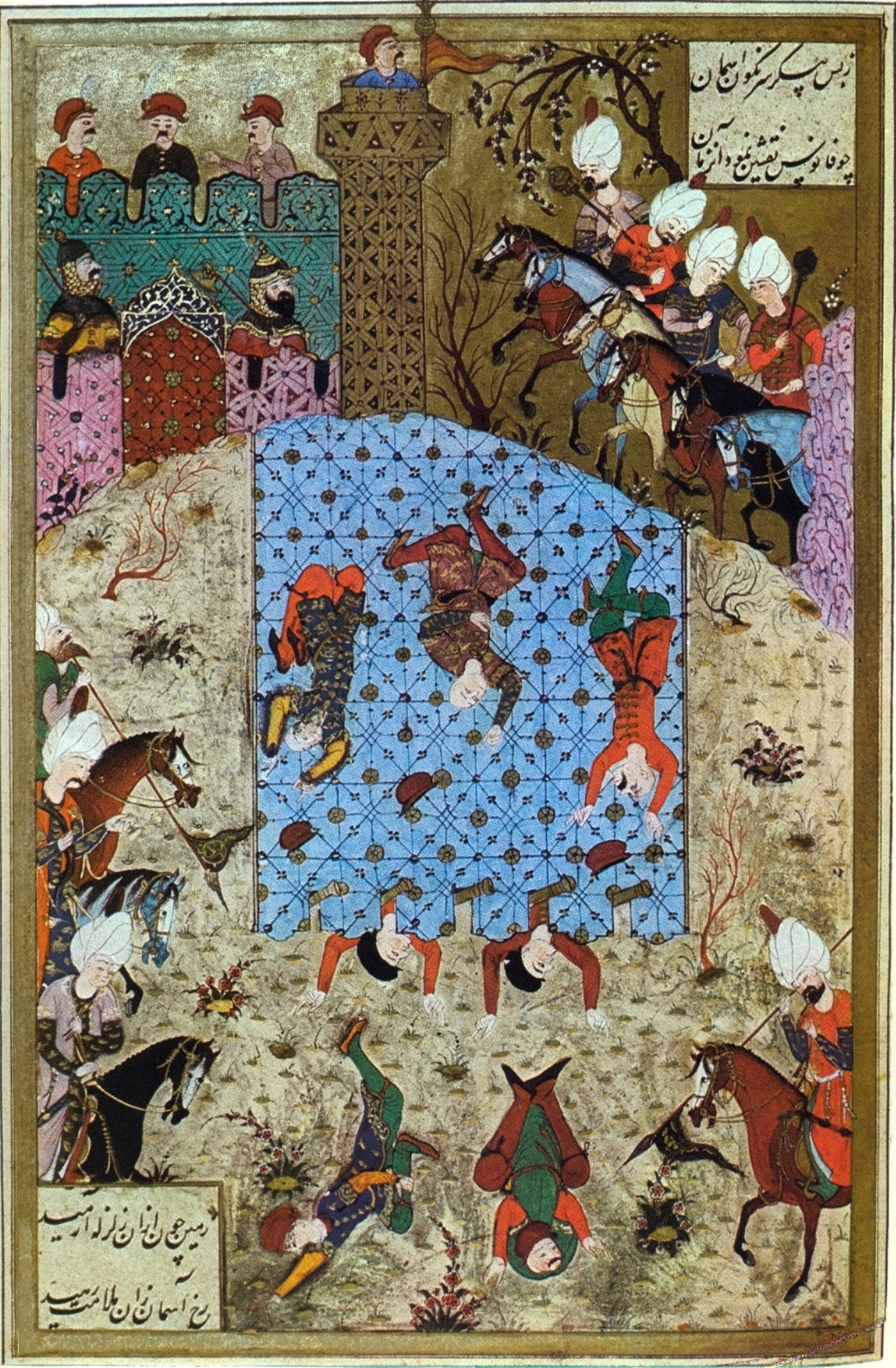
Capture of Buda (1526)

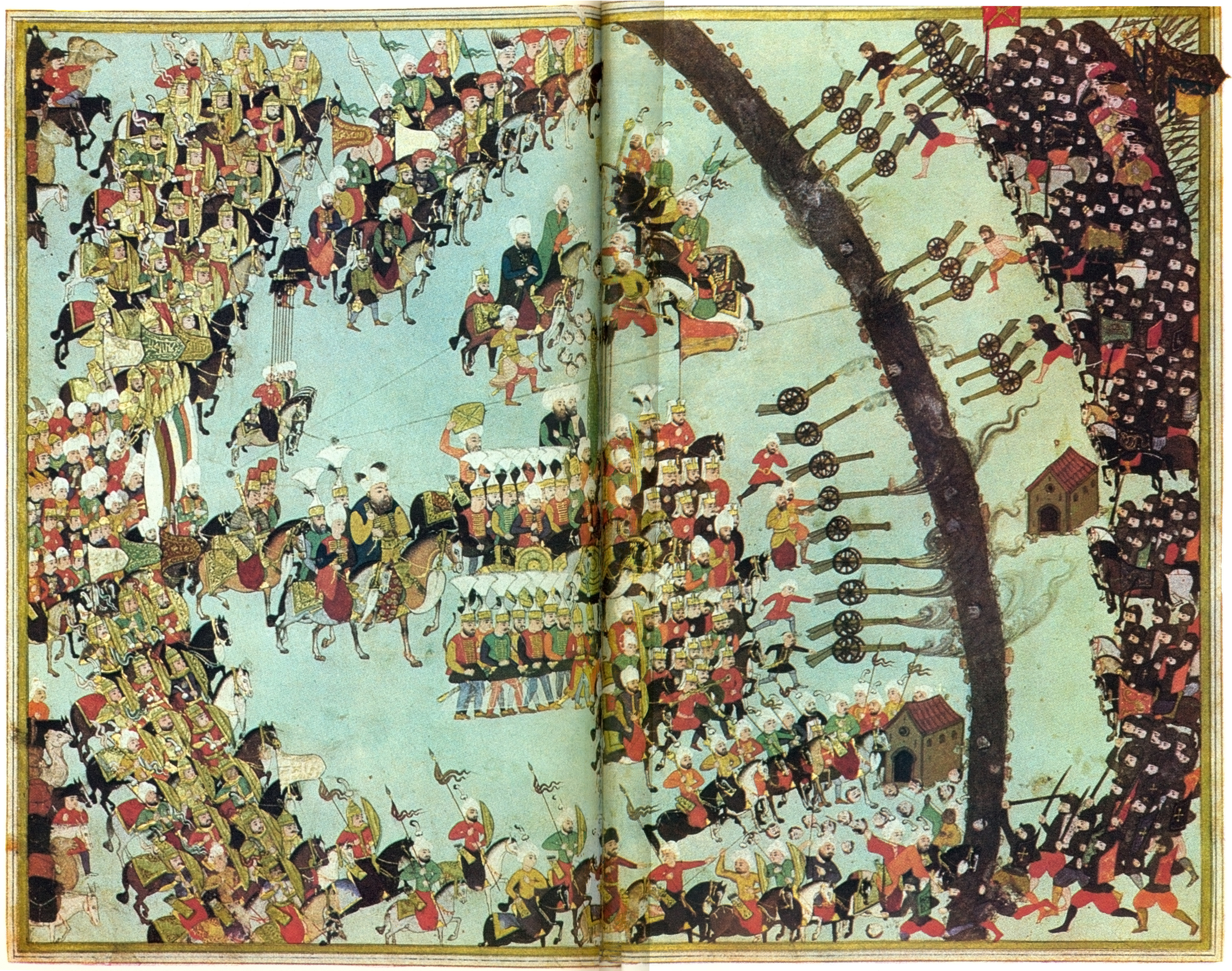
Battle of Keresztes (1596)

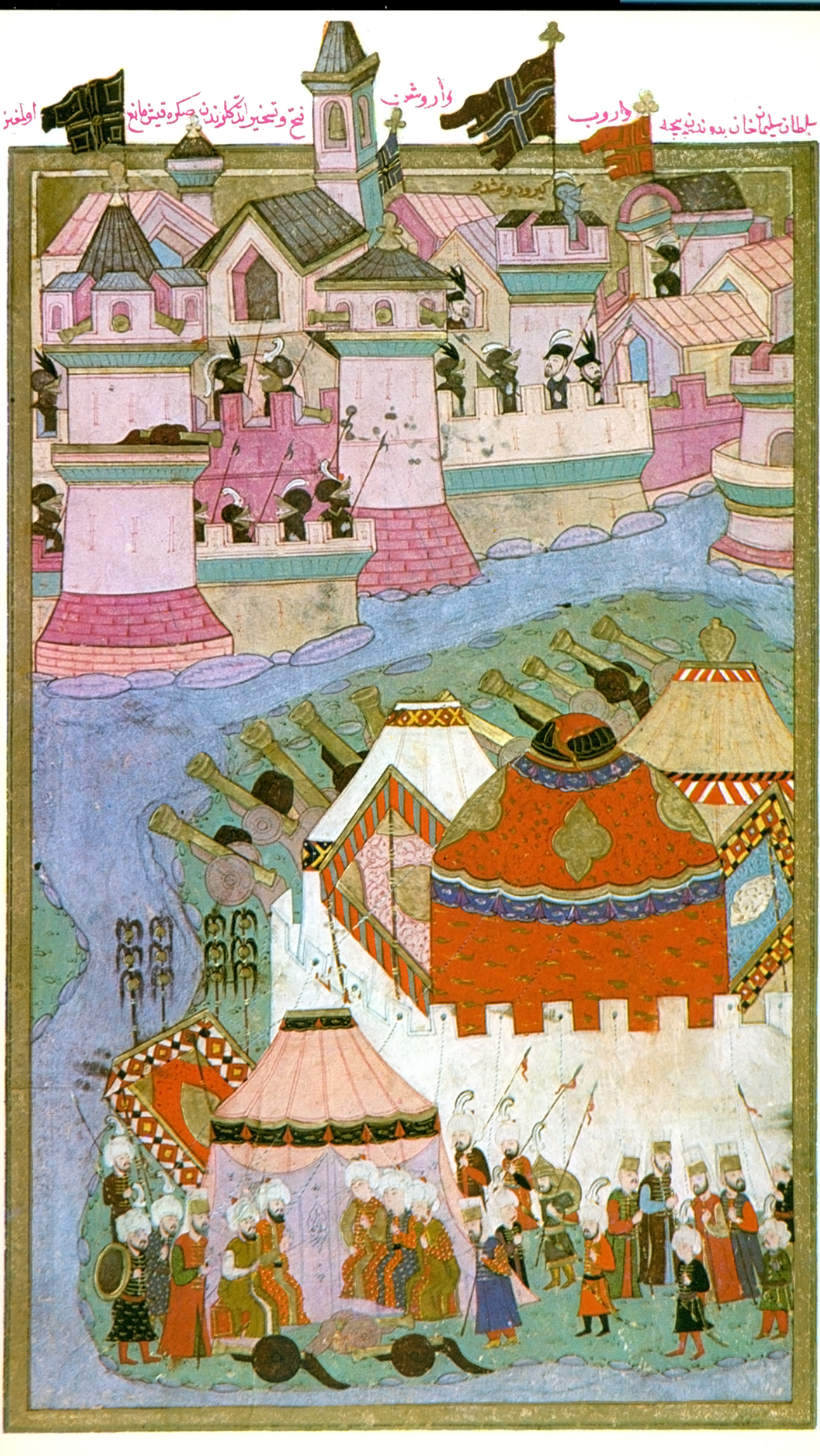
War council after the unsuccessful First Siege of Vienna (1529)

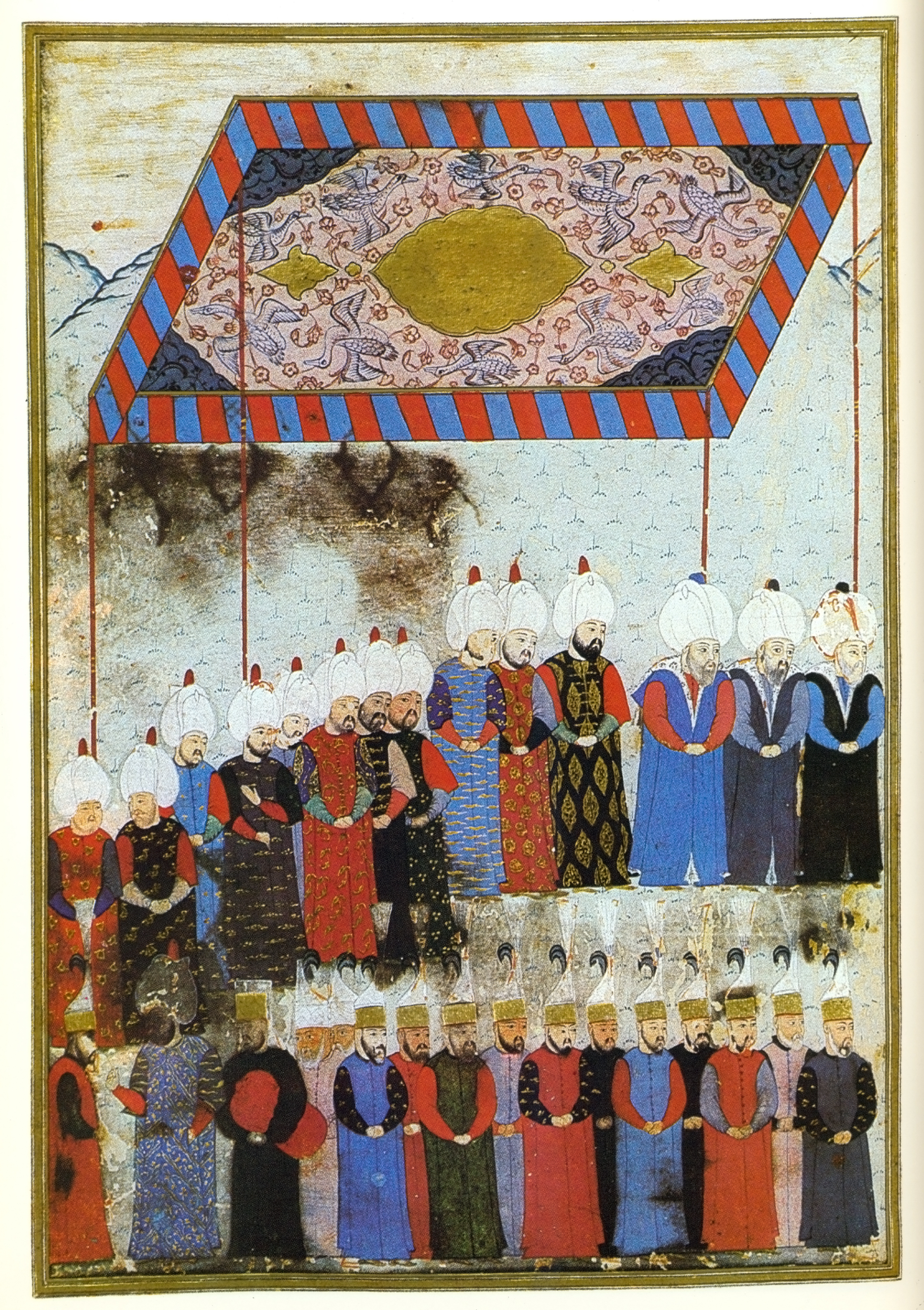
Selim II ascends to the throne

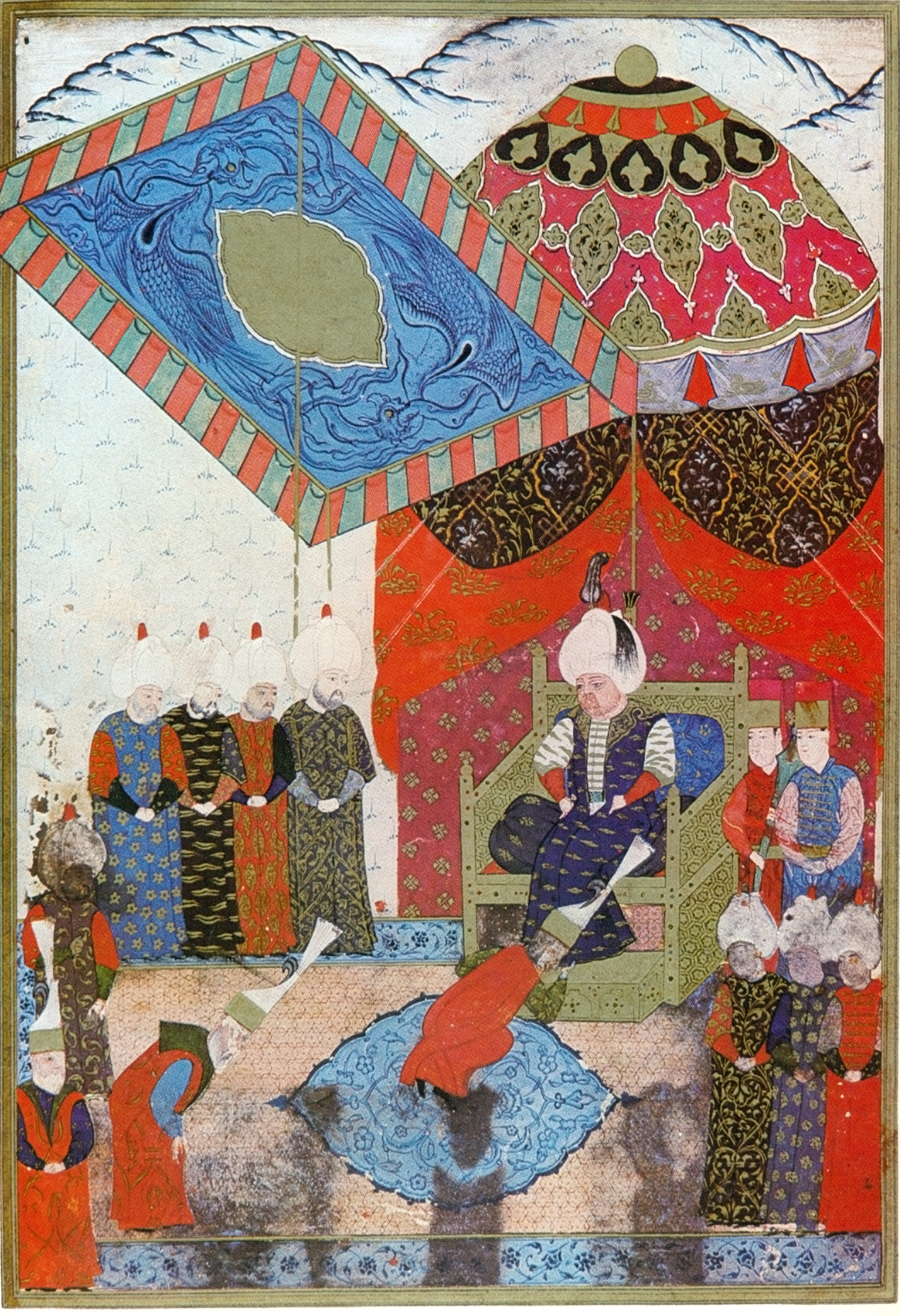
Selim II ascends to the throne

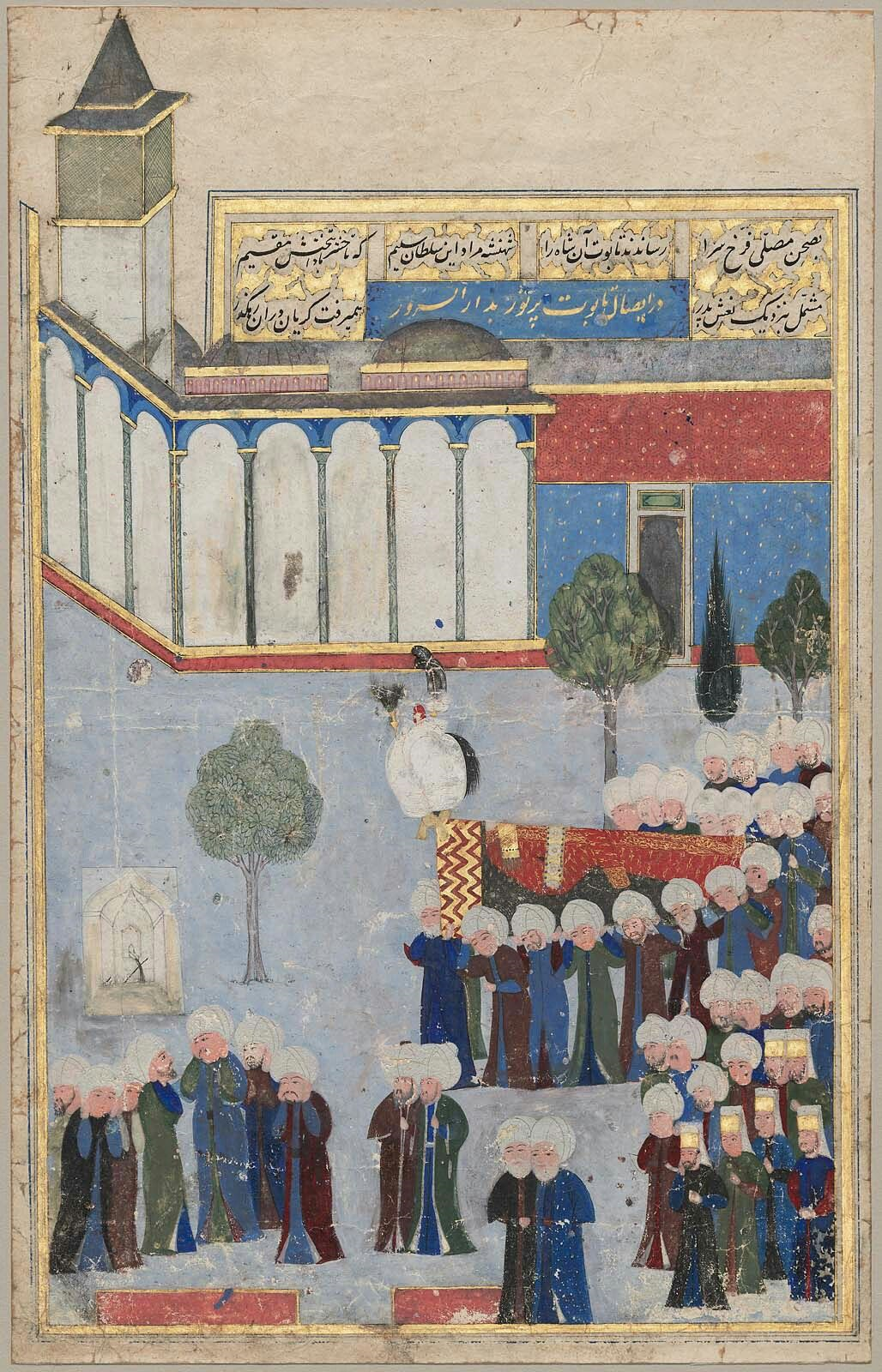
Funeral of Murad II

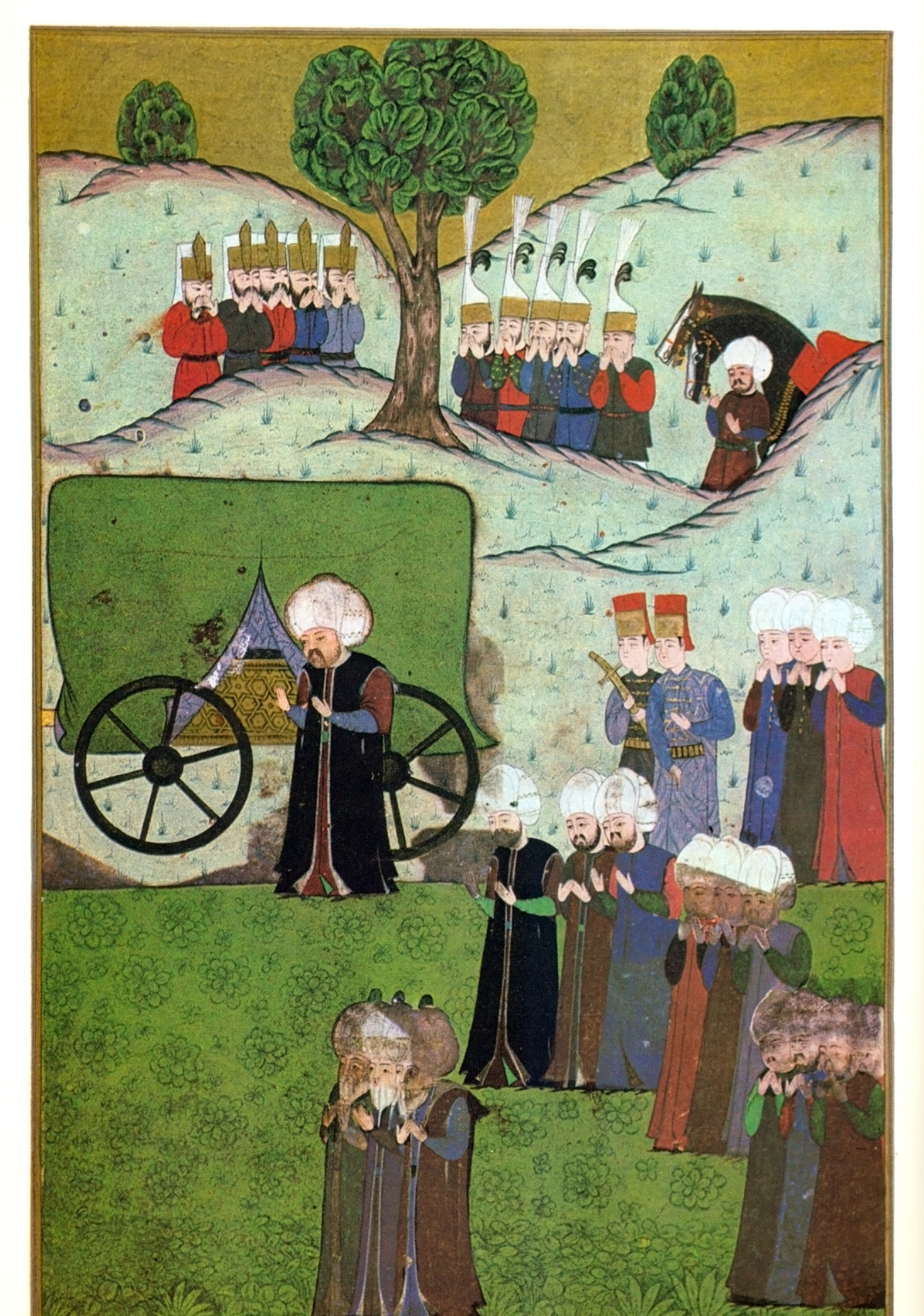
The body of Suleiman I arrives in Belgrade, Selim II is waiting for it

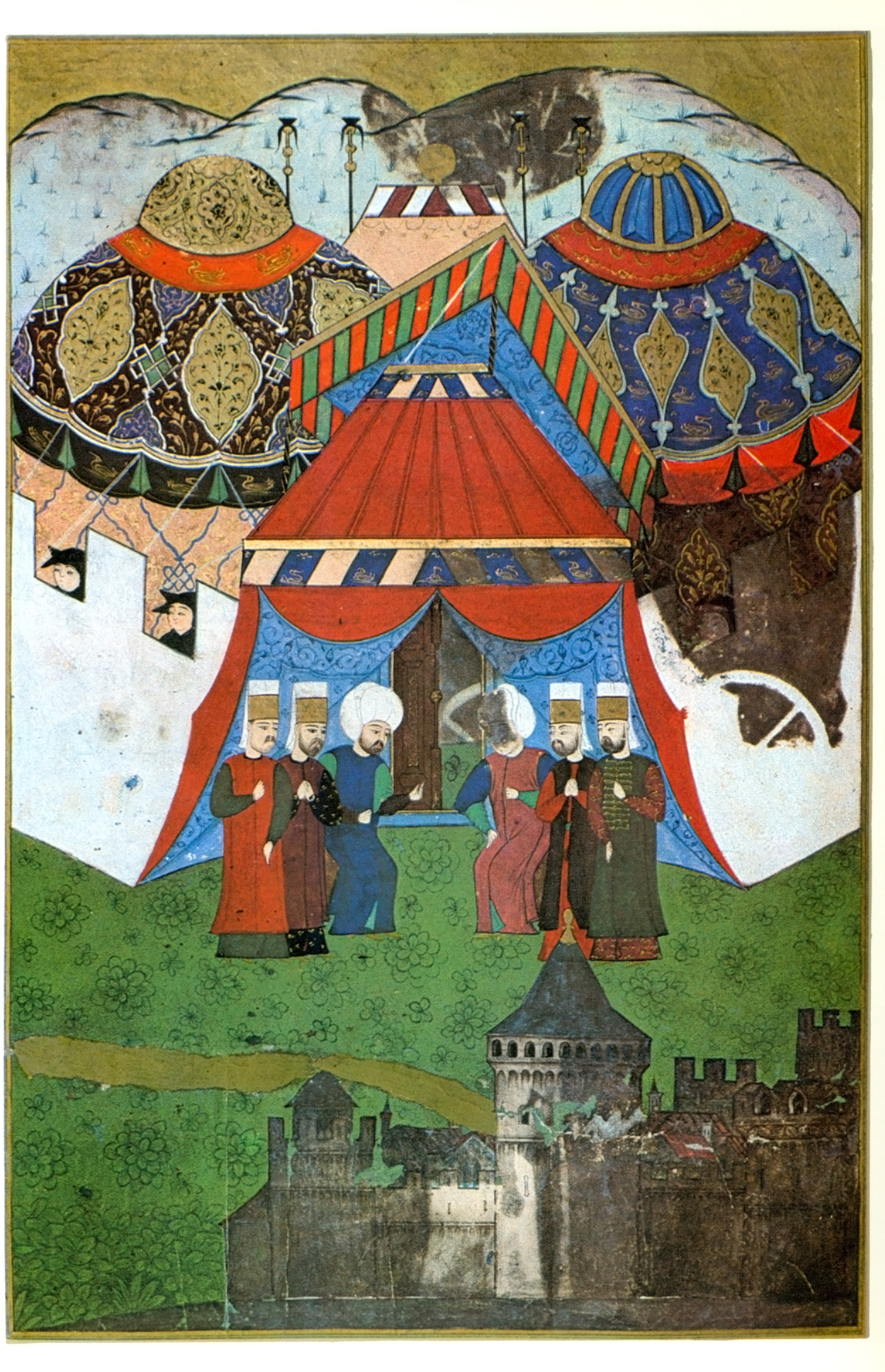
The body of Suleiman I arrives in Belgrade, Selim II is waiting for it

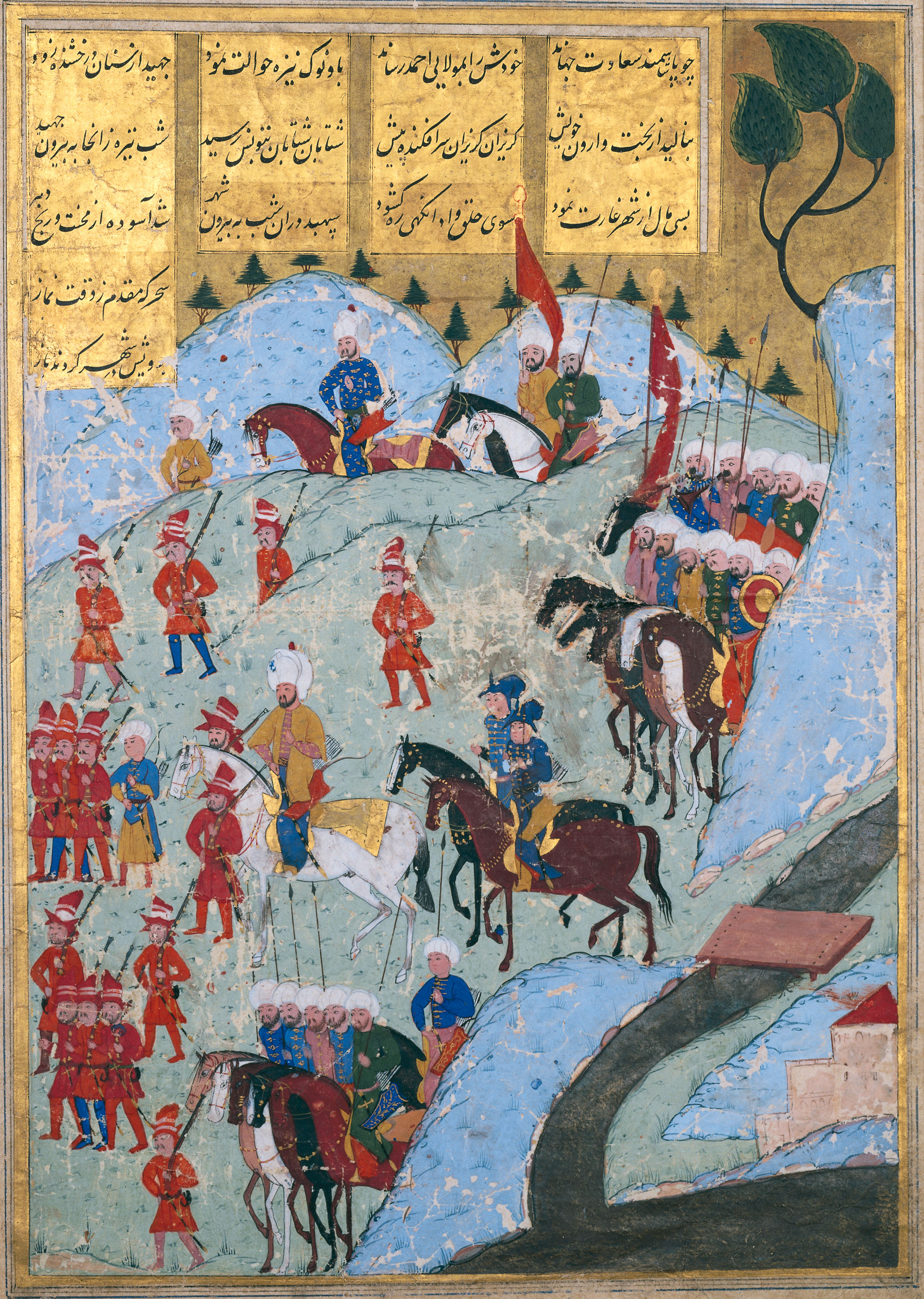
The Ottoman army marching on the city of Tunis in 1569

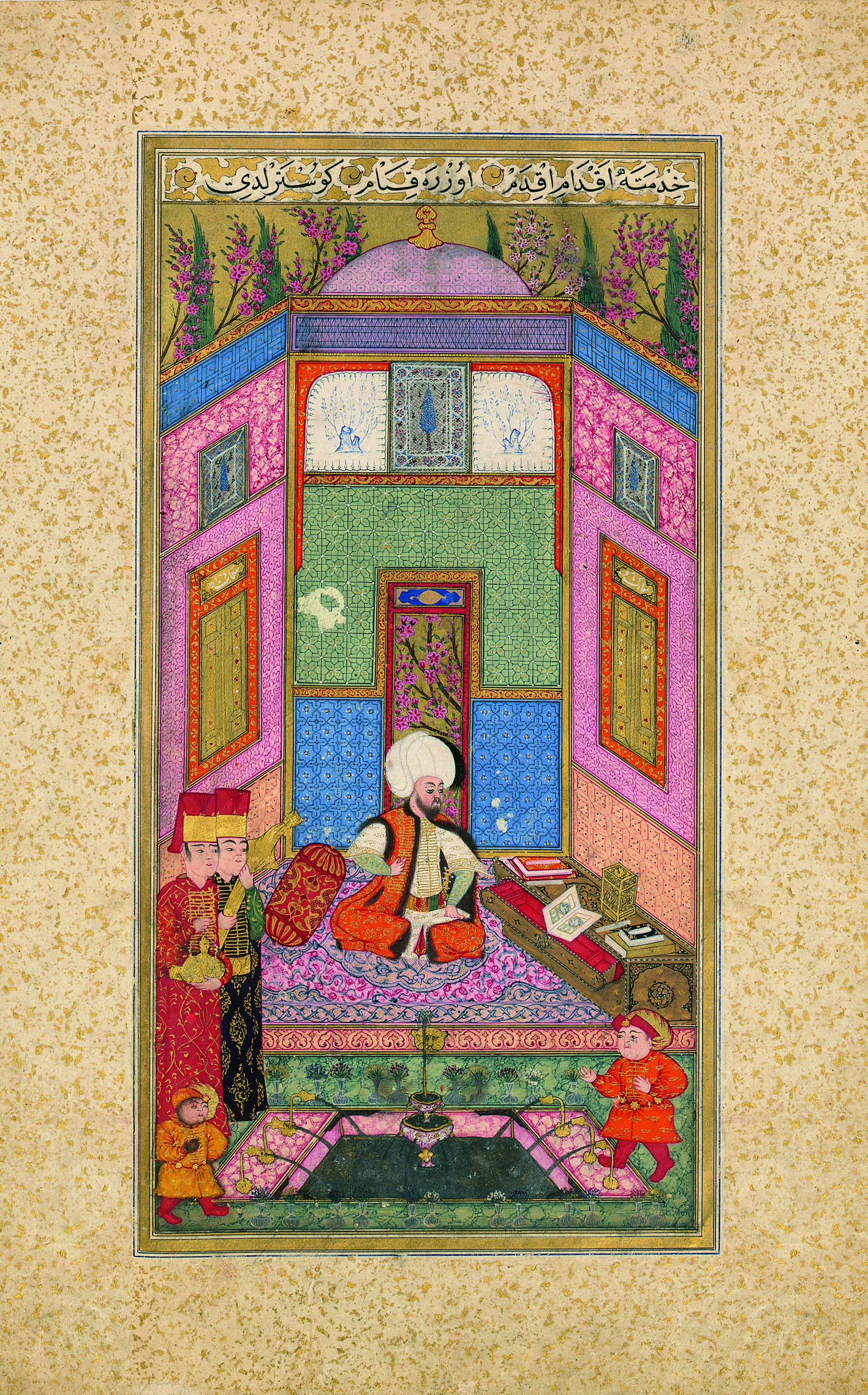
Sultan Murad III in The Book of Felicity (1582)

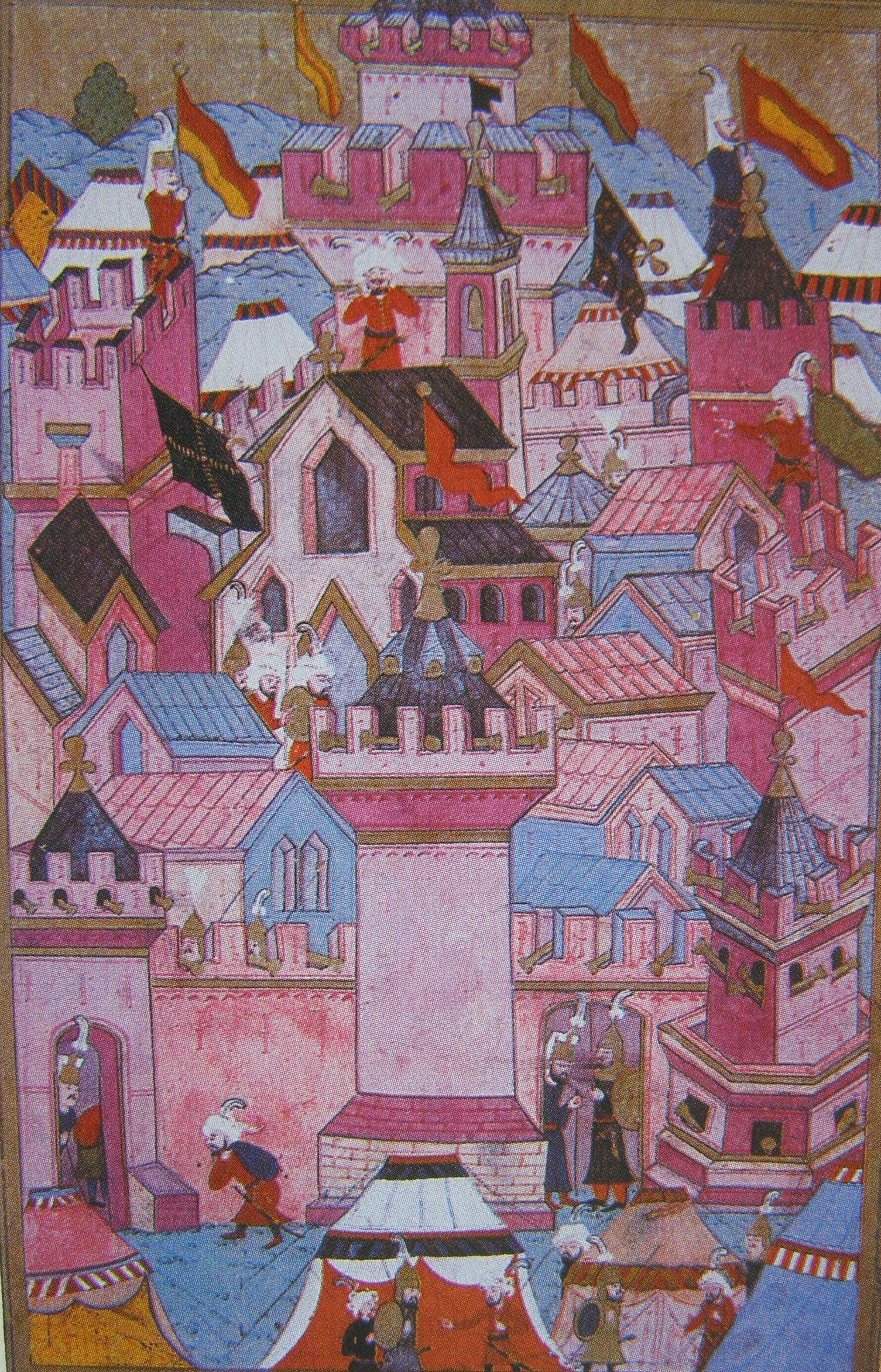
Siege of Esztergom (1543)

== See also ==
- Culture of the Ottoman Empire
- Persian miniature
- Mughal painting
- My Name Is Red, a historical-fiction novel involving Ottoman miniature artists

== Sources ==
- Aybey, Neşe (May 1979). "XX Yuzyilda Türk Minyatur Sanatı" [The Art of the Turkish Miniature in the 20th Century] (PDF). Sanat Dünyamız (in Turkish). Vol. 6, no. 16. Yapi Kredi Publications. pp. 37–42. Archived from the original (PDF) on 19 September 2018.
- Mesara, Gülbün [in Turkish]. "Türk Tezhip ve Minyatür Sanatı" (PDF) (in Turkish). pp. 9–21. Archived from the original (PDF) on 6 May 2017.
