= Reşat Mursaloğlu =

Turkish politician

Reşat Mursaloğlu (1915 – 21 December 1987) was a Turkish politician.

He studied at Ankara University, Law School, dropped out, however, in his senior year. He worked as a farmer and merchant. He served as district mayor of İskenderun Municipality, and was a deputy of Hatay Province from the Republican People's Party (CHP) in the 13th Parliament of the Grand National Assembly.

He was married and the father of three children.

Mursaloğlu died on 21 December 1987.
