= William E. Seay =

American politician (1921–2013)

William Earl Seay

Member of the Missouri House of Representatives

Personal details
- Born: December 13, 1921 Salem, Missouri
- Died: February 16, 2013 (aged 91) St. Louis, Missouri
- Party: Democratic
- Spouse: Shirley Anderson (m. 1950)
- Children: 3 sons, 1 daughter
- Occupation: attorney, military pilot

William Earl Seay (December 13, 1921 – February 16, 2013) was an American politician who served in the Missouri House of Representatives. He was first elected to the Missouri House of Representatives in 1964. He was educated at Salem High School, Central Methodist College, and the University of Missouri-Columbia. Between 1942 and 1946, Seay was a P-47 Thunderbolt fighter pilot in the U.S. Army Air Corps who served during World War II as a member of the First Air Squadron in the South Pacific. He also served seven terms as the prosecuting attorney for Dent County, Missouri.
