= List of ship launches in 1997 =

The list of ship launches in 1997 includes a chronological list of all ships launched in 1997.

Date	Ship	Class / type	Builder	Location	Country	Notes
3 January	Katrine Mærsk	K-class container ship	Odense Staalskibsvaerft	Lindø	Denmark	For Maersk Line
18 January	McFaul	Arleigh Burke-class destroyer	Ingalls Shipbuilding	Pascagoula, Mississippi	United States	
28 February	Sisler	Watson-class vehicle cargo ship	National Steel and Shipbuilding Company	San Diego, California	United States	
February	Rotterdam	Rotterdam-class amphibious transport dock	Koninklijke Schelde Groep	Flushing	Netherlands	
6 March	City of Cardiff	Dredger	Appledore Shipbuilders Ltd.	Appledore	United Kingdom	For United Marine Dredging Ltd.
14 March	Bonhomme Richard	Wasp-class amphibious assault ship	Ingalls Shipbuilding	Pascagoula, Mississippi	United States	
26 March	Superfast III	ROPAX ferry	Kvaerner Masa-Yards	Turku	Finland	For Superfast Ferries
27 March	Bob Hope	Bob Hope-class vehicle cargo ship	Avondale Shipyard	Avondale, Louisiana	United States	
March	SuperSeaCat Two	MDV1200-class monofull fast ferry	Fincantieri	Genoa	Italy	For Sea Containers
4 April	Kirsten Mærsk	K-class container ship	Odense Staalskibsvaerft	Lindø	Denmark	For Maersk Line
6 April	Betagas	LNG tanker	Appledore Shipbuilders Ltd.	Appledore	United Kingdom	For Betagas Partenreederei.
17 April	Disney Magic	cruise ship	Fincantieri	Marghera	Italy	For Disney Cruise Line
24 April	Superfast IV	ROPAX ferry	Kvaerner Masa-Yards	Turku	Finland	For Superfast Ferries
April	Chang Chien	Cheng Kung-class frigate	China Shipbuilding	Kaohsiung	Taiwan	
3 May	Donald Cook	Arleigh Burke-class destroyer	Bath Iron Works	Bath, Maine	United States	
3 May	Schleswig-Holstein	train ferry	Van der Giessen de Noord	Krimpen aan den IJssel	Netherlands	For Scandlines
10 May	Te Mana	Anzac-class frigate	Tenix Defence	Williamstown, Victoria	Australia	For Royal New Zealand Navy
20 May	Amber Lagoon	Amber Lagoon-class freight ship	Shanghai Shipyard & Chengxi Shipyard Company	Shanghai	China	For MACS Maritime Carrier Shipping
7 June	Peene Ore	bulk carrier	Daewoo Heavy Industries	Okpo	South Korea	
8 June	Aconit	La Fayette-class frigate			France	
1 July	Deutschland	train ferry	Van der Giessen de Noord	Krimpen aan den IJssel	Netherlands	For Scandlines
5 July	City of Chichester	Dredger	Appledore Shipbuilders Ltd.	Appledore	United Kingdom	For United Marine Dredging Ltd.
11 July	Mercury	cruise ship	Meyer Werft	Papenburg	Germany	For Celebrity Cruises
26 July	Watson	Watson-class vehicle cargo ship	National Steel and Shipbuilding Company	San Diego, California	United States	
31 July	Sovereign Mærsk	S-class container ship	Odense Staalskibsvaerft	Lindø	Denmark	For Maersk Line
9 August	Skåne	ro-ro/train ferry	Astilleros Españoles	Puerto Real	Spain	For SweFerry Ab
19 August	Yūdachi	Murasame-class destroyer			Japan	
21 August	Kirisame	Murasame-class destroyer			Japan	
28 August	Petrojarl Banff	FSPO	Hyundai Mipo Dockyard	Ulsan	South Korea	
1 September	Connecticut	Seawolf-class submarine	Electric Boat	Groton, Connecticut	United States	
1 September	Vision of the Seas	Vision-class cruise ship	Chantiers de l’Atlantique	Saint Nazaire	France	For Royal Caribbean International
18 September	Michishio	Oyashio-class submarine			Japan	
27 September	Neuwerk	multi-purpose vessel	Volkswerft	Stralsund	Germany	For Federal Ministry of Transport and Digital Infrastructure
27 September	Shanghai Express	London Express-class container ship	Samsung Shipbuilding & Heavy Industries	Koje	South Korea	For Hapag-Lloyd
29 September	Fulda	Frankenthal-class minehunter	Abeking & Rasmussen		Germany	For German Navy
2 October	Dahl	Watson-class vehicle cargo ship	National Steel and Shipbuilding Company	San Diego, California	United States	
4 October	Higgins	Arleigh Burke-class destroyer	Bath Iron Works	Bath, Maine	United States	
21 October	Fisher	Bob Hope-class vehicle cargo ship	Avondale Shipyard	Avondale, Louisiana	United States	
21 October	Purple Beach	Amber Lagoon-class freight ship	Shanghai Shipyard & Chengxi Shipyard Company	Shanghai	China	For MACS Maritime Carrier Shipping
24 October	Susan Mærsk	S-class container ship	Odense Staalskibsvaerft	Lindø	Denmark	For Maersk Line
October	Shenzhen	Type 051B destroyer	Dalian Shipyard	Dalian	China	
12 November	Porter	Arleigh Burke-class destroyer	Ingalls Shipbuilding	Pascagoula, Mississippi	United States	
15 November	Healy	Polar icebreaker	Avondale Shipyard	Westwego, Louisiana	United States	
29 November	Düsseldorf Express	London Express-class container ship	Samsung Shipbuilding & Heavy Industries	Koje	South Korea	For Hapag-Lloyd
November	Lesley PG	tanker	Appledore Shipbuilders Ltd.	Appledore	United Kingdom	For Giles W.Pritchard-Gordon & Co. Ltd.
Date unknown	Faoilean	Workboat	David Abels Boatbuilders Ltd.	Bristol	United Kingdom	For private owner.
Date unknown	Ferryman	Launch	David Abels Boatbuilders Ltd.	Bristol	United Kingdom	For private owner.
Date unknown	Kota Wajar	container ship		Singapore	Singapore	
Date unknown	MCS Lenie	Tug	David Abels Boatbuilders Ltd.	Bristol	United Kingdom	For Maritime Craft Services (Clyde) Ltd.
Date unknown	Scenic II	Passenger launch	David Abels Boatbuilders Ltd.	Bristol	United Kingdom	For Pulteney Cruises Ltd.
Date unknown	Taunt	Ferry	David Abels Boatbuilders Ltd.	Bristol	United Kingdom	For private owner.
Date unknown	Warbler	Ferry	David Abels Boatbuilders Ltd.	Bristol	United Kingdom	For private owner.
