= Phase III offensive =

Part of the Vietnam War (1968)

- Part of the Vietnam War
Date	17 August – 27 September 1968
Location	South Vietnam
Result	US / South Vietnamese victory

Belligerents
United States; South Vietnam	North Vietnam (Provisional Revolutionary Government of the Republic of South Vietnam) Viet Cong

Commanders and leaders
(United States) Creighton Abrams; Keith L. Ware †; Ellis W. Williamson; Carl A. Youngdale (South Vietnam) Cao Văn Viên	(North Vietnam) Lê Duẩn; Văn Tiến Dũng (Provisional Revolutionary Government of the Republic of South Vietnam) Hoàng Văn Thái; Chu Huy Mân

Units involved
(United States) III MAF; 1st Marine Division; (United States) I FFV; Americal Division; 1st Sqn., 1st ACR; (South Vietnam) I Corps; 51st Infantry; 21st & 37th Rangers; (South Vietnam) II Corps; 45th Infantry; 3 MIKE Companies; (United States) II FFV; 1st Infantry Division; 25th Infantry Division; 2nd Sqn., 11th ACR; (South Vietnam) III Corps; 5th Division; 6th & 8th Airborne; 1st, 2nd & 3rd Marine	Military Region 5; 2nd Division; 3rd Division; 368B Artillery Rgt.; 402nd Sapper Bn.; Group 44: R20, V25, T89 Battalions; 1st Division; 24th Infantry Rgt.; 40th Artillery Rgt.; 20th Sapper Bn.; B2 Front; 5th Division; 7th Division; 9th Division; Tây Ninh: D14 Bn.; Bến Tre: 516th & 550th Battalions; Mỹ Tho: 263rd & 514A Battalions

Casualties and losses
Unknown	US / South Vietnamese body count: 29,000+ killed or wounded
- Civilian: 1,036 dead 2,536 wounded

Phase III of the Tet Offensive of 1968 (also known as the August offensive or Third offensive) was launched by the People's Army of Vietnam (PAVN) and Viet Cong (VC) from 17 August to 27 September 1968. The offensive was divided into two waves of attacks from 17 to 31 August 1968 and from 11 to 27 September of that same year.

== Background ==
In late June 1968, COSVN and the commanders of Military Region 5 held a series of conferences to review the results of the May offensive, also in attendance was Lê Duẩn who had pushed for the original plan for the General Offensive–General Uprising. The majority of the attendees, including Chinese military advisers, regarded the May offensive as a failure and opposed any renewal of the offensive. Lê Duẩn supported by General Hoàng Văn Thái and General Chu Huy Mân then persuaded the attendees to support the launching of a third offensive by mid-August. The Chinese advisers opposed this decision and returned to China, while several of the Vietnamese who had voiced their opposition to the new offensive were fired. The offensives of May and August were primarily re-directed towards military targets, intending to blunt the perception that military victory was attainable for the United States (US).

On 24 July in Hanoi, Lê Duẩn met with senior leaders responsible for military affairs including PAVN chief of staff, General Văn Tiến Dũng to develop the operational plan for the offensive.

After considering the recommendations submitted by COSVN and Military Region 5, it was agreed that Tây Ninh Province with its proximity to base areas in Cambodia would be the main area of operations. Saigon would not be targeted because of the severe losses suffered by VC forces there in the Tet and May offensives and subsequent Allied security operations. The plan called for the 5th and 9th Divisions to draw the US 25th Infantry Division away from its positions between Tây Ninh and Dầu Tiếng allowing VC local force units to attack Tây Ninh. The 7th Division would attack Lộc Ninh in Bình Long Province to divert the US 1st Infantry Division and the Army of the Republic of Vietnam (ARVN) 5th Division from reinforcing Tây Ninh. Other PAVN/VC units would launch further diversionary attacks across the region.

In the Central Highlands the PAVN 1st Division was to seize the Duc Lap Camp and then move northeast to threaten Buôn Ma Thuột. The PAVN 24th Regiment would cut Highway 14 between Buôn Ma Thuột and Pleiku. The 95C and 101D Regiments would make diversionary attacks on Allied bases across Kon Tum Province, while in the lowland areas VC units would make attacks by fire and sapper attacks on Allied bases.

In central I Corps the PAVN 31st and 38th Regiments would attack the 1st Marine Division positions around Đà Nẵng allowing 6 VC local force battalions to penetrate and attack key installations across the city while the PAVN 368B Artillery Regiment would shell Da Nang Air Base.

In southern I Corps a reinforced regiment from the PAVN 2nd Division would attack Tam Kỳ and another reinforced regiment from the PAVN 3rd Division would attack Quảng Ngãi city.

Allied intelligence was able to detect the planning of the offensive, its timing and objectives. On 10 August COMUSMACV General Creighton Abrams reported to the US Joint Chiefs of Staff that the “current deployment of [allied] ground forces is satisfactory,” and he was “confident in our ability” to defeat the offensive. Abrams ordered increased air strikes on suspected PAVN/VC assembly areas, but specifically ordered his commanders not to be drawn out into the countryside, but rather to stay back and defend the population centers.

== Offensive ==
=== I Corps ===
==== Đà Nẵng ====
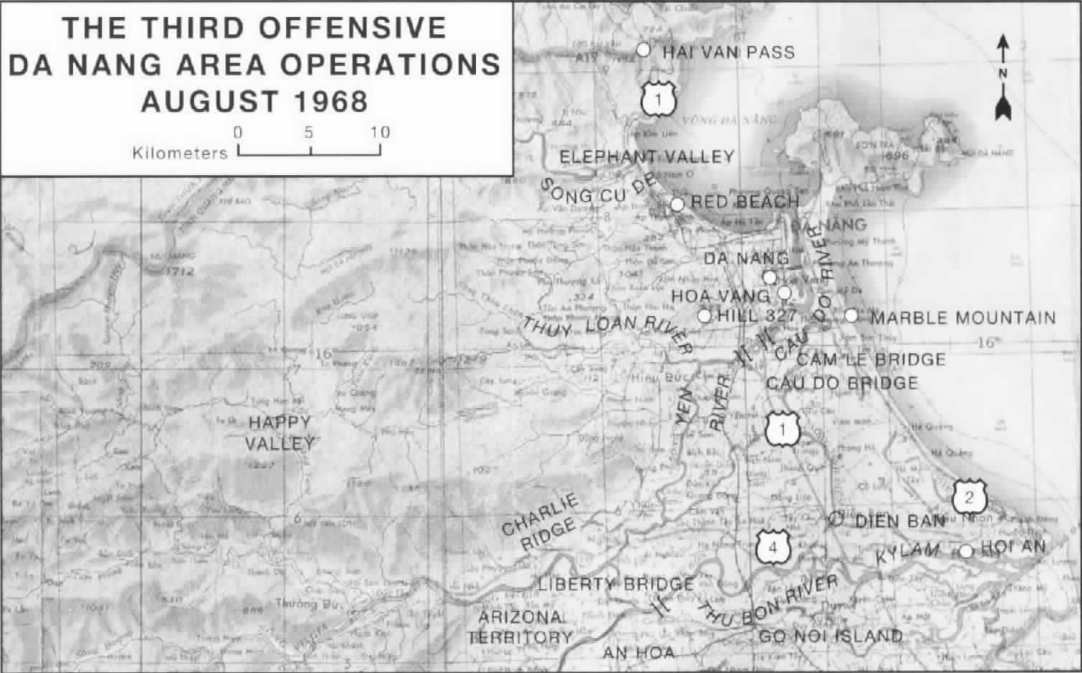
Đà Nẵng in the August Offensive 1968

On the night of 22–23 August, PAVN and VC attacked 36 bases, towns and cities across I Corps mainly with rocket and mortar fire. A VC sapper attack on Landing Zone Bowman (15.49°N 108.427°E) in the Que Son Valley killed five US and wounded 26 while the VC lost only one killed and one captured. In Đà Nẵng, a company from the R20 Battalion and a sapper platoon infiltrated Forward Operating Base 4, a compound just south of Marble Mountain Air Facility that contained a Military Assistance Command, Vietnam – Studies and Observations Group headquarters, several Special Forces teams and a MIKE Force company, killing 17 Special Forces soldiers (their largest one-day loss of the war) and wounding another 125 allied soldiers, 32 VC were killed.

At 01:00 on 23 August, the VC V25 and T89 Battalions tried to capture the Cẩm Lệ Bridge, 2 km south of Da Nang Air Base to allow follow-on units to attack the city. A platoon of US Marine Corps (USMC) Company D, 1st Military Police Battalion defended the bridge from their bunkers until they were relieved by the 1st Battalion, 27th Marines and ARVN Rangers. North of the bridge, a company from the VC 402nd Sapper Battalion tried to seize the Hòa Vang District, but were held back by Regional Force units who were also reinforced by Marines and Rangers. The 402nd Sappers fell back to the Cẩm Lệ Bridge, where they continued to fight for a further nine hours, but by late afternoon after air and artillery strikes they abandoned the position leaving 184 dead.

South of Đà Nẵng, (Note: the ARVN 51st Infantry Regiment operated independently from late 1965 till mid 1972) the ARVN 51st Regiment and two Ranger battalions with Marine air support repulsed probing attacks from the PAVN 31st and 38th Regiments, killing almost 300 PAVN before they withdrew to their bases on Go Noi Island.

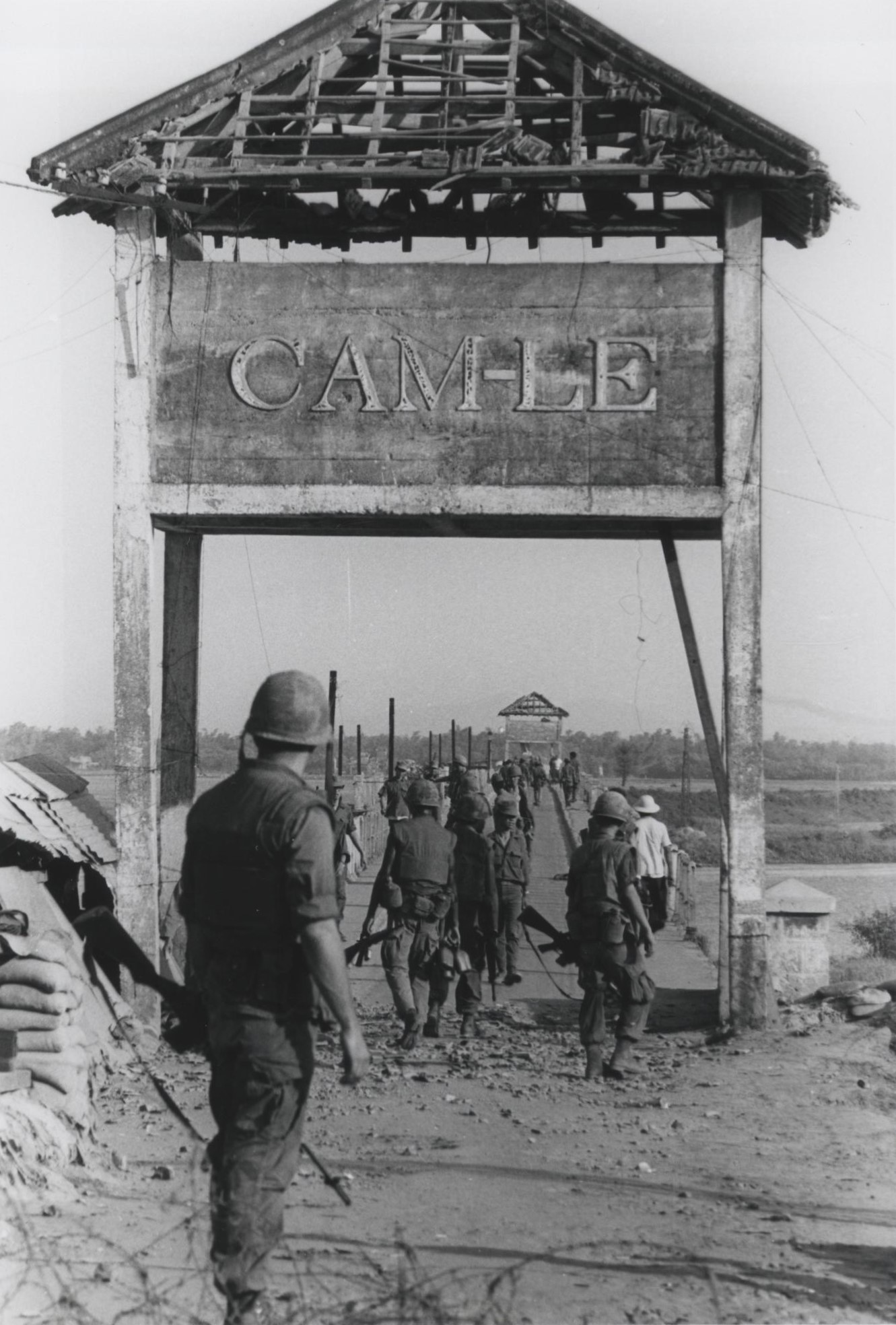
Cẩm Lệ Bridge reopened on 24 August

1st Marine Division commander MG Carl A. Youngdale ordered his units to block the retreat of the PAVN from Đà Nẵng in Operation Sussex Bay. At 08:15 on 29 August, Company M, 3rd Battalion, 7th Marines engaged a PAVN force 4 km south of Hill 55. Company D 1st Battalion, 1st Marines and Company G 2/27th Marines supported by tanks arrived to support the 3/7 Marines killing 42 PAVN for the loss of two Marines killed and 41 wounded. ARVN Rangers engaged a PAVN Battalion between the hamlets of Dong Lien and Ha Nong Tay (2) killing 80 PAVN for the loss of eight ARVN. Further south a PAVN platoon ambushed Company D, 1st Battalion, 5th Marines near the Yen River killing 12 Marines and wounding 18 for the loss of 25 PAVN dead.

At midnight on 30 August, Company H 2nd Battalion, 5th Marines ambushed a PAVN unit attempting to cross the Ky Lam River to Go Noi island killing 29 for no US losses. An ARVN Ranger unit swept the area later that day killing a further 31 PAVN/VC.

On 31 August, the 21st and 37th Ranger Battalions trapped a PAVN unit in a bend of the Ky Lam River with the 3rd Battalion, 5th Marines on the opposite bank killing 80 PAVN with one captured for the loss of seven ARVN dead and 45 wounded. At 20:00, Company H 2/5th Marines ambushed 30 PAVN as they attempted to cross the Ky Lam River on boats, killing all on board.

==== Quảng Ngãi ====
On the morning of 24 August, patrols from Troop A, 1st Squadron, 1st Cavalry Regiment engaged the 1st Regiment, 3rd Division 6 km west of Quảng Ngãi. Troops B and C of the 1/1st Cavalry and an infantry company from each of the 4th Battalion, 21st Infantry Regiment and the 2nd Battalion, 1st Infantry Regiment were sent to support Troop A. After four days of fighting, the 1st Regiment withdrew west to its mountain bases leaving 567 dead.

=== II Corps ===
The initiation of Phase IIl Offensive in Kontum Province was triggered by a feint at Ben Het Camp in the northwest on the night of 14 August by heavy weapons attacks of the PAVN 40th Artillery Regiment. Three days later, on the morning of 18 August, a battalion from the 101D Regiment attacked Dak Seang Camp 15 km to the north. The CIDG defenders repelled the assault, killing 35 PAVN and capturing 11. The following day, PAVN gunners hit the camp with mortar and recoilless rifle fire.

On 20 August, a battalion from the 24th Regiment assaulted an ARVN firebase on Highway 14 22 km north of Pleiku. The ARVN repelled the assault killing 87 PAVN for the loss of 9 ARVN dead.

On the night of 23–24 August, PAVN/VC artillery hit more than thirty locations across II Corps.

Also on the night of 23 August, the 66th Regiment and the 20th Sapper Battalion gathered near Duc Lap Camp in preparation for their attack on the base while the 320th Regiment established a blocking position on Highway 14 northeast of Duc Lap to intercept Allied ground units. In the ensuing Battle of Duc Lap from 24 to 27 August, with reinforcements from three MIKE Force companies and the 2/45th Battalion of the ARVN 23rd Division, the Camp garrison repelled the PAVN assault, suffering losses of 107 ARVN and 7 US killed. The I FFV estimated over 700 PAVN were killed, most from air and artillery strikes

=== III Corps ===
==== Tây Ninh ====
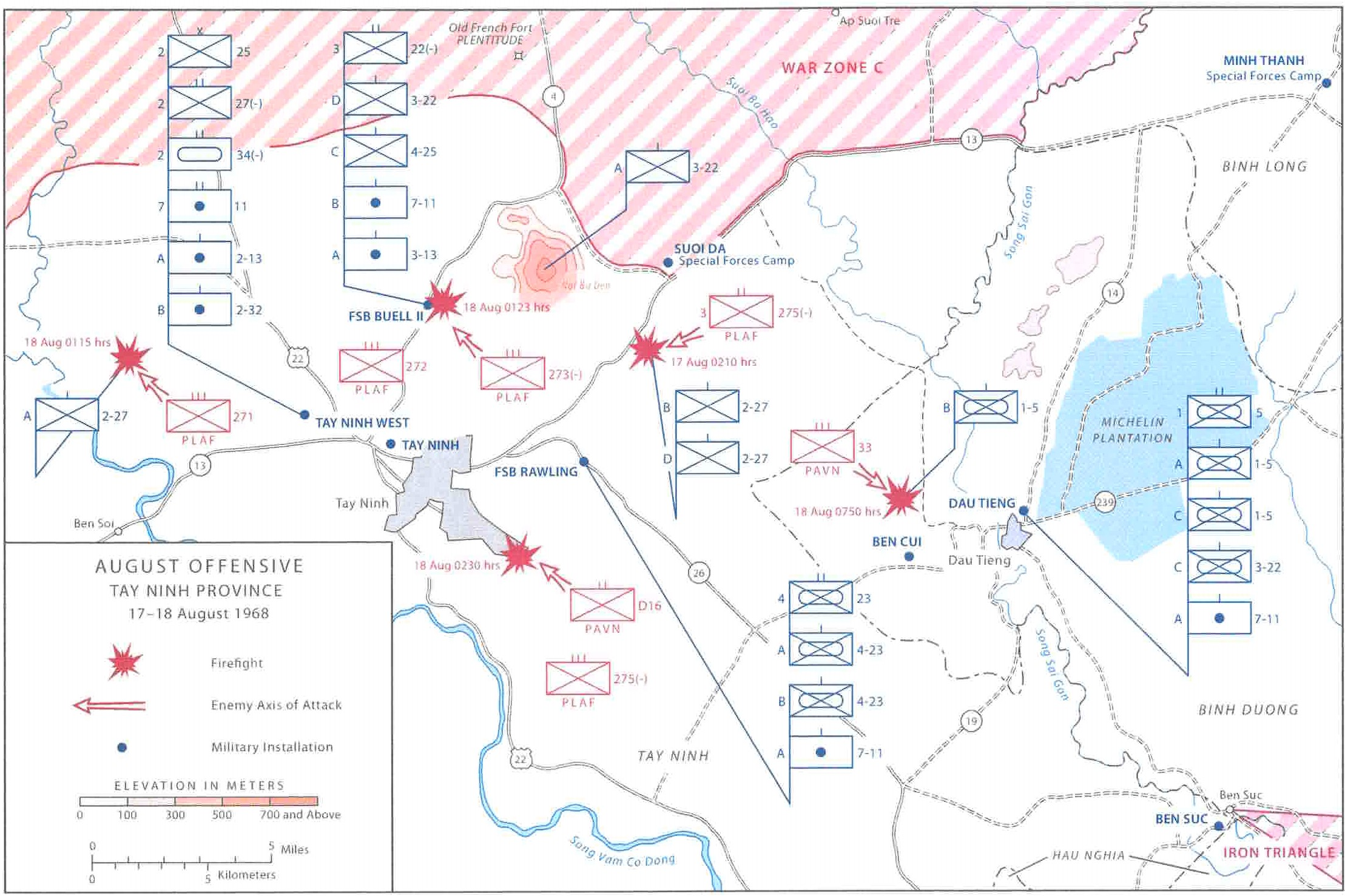
Phase III offensive, Tay Ninh Province, 17–18 August 1968

On the evening of 17 August a night ambush patrol from Company D, 2nd Battalion, 27th Infantry Regiment, operating between Nui Ba Den and Highway 13 3 km east of Tây Ninh, observed a VC unit marching toward the capital. They called in artillery fire and engaged the VC with small arms and the VC retreated to the north and east.

At midnight on 18 August a battalion from the 273rd Regiment, 9th Division, attacked Firebase Buell II (11.373°N 106.127°E) which was defended by 2 platoons from Company D, 3rd Battalion, 22nd Infantry Regiment, two platoons from Company C, 4th Battalion, 23rd Infantry Regiment and five M48 tanks from Company A, 2nd Battalion, 34th Armor Regiment. The PAVN hit the tanks with B40 Rocket-propelled grenades to no effect and were unable to penetrate the base perimeter. At dawn the PAVN withdrew leaving 104 dead and eight wounded.

At the same time 9th Division sappers climbed Nui Ba Den to attack the US communications station on its summit. The sappers penetrated the perimeter destroying several buildings and the electric generators that provided power to the base. At dawn the PAVN withdrew leaving 15 dead. US losses were eight dead and 23 wounded. New generators were flown in and the base became operational later that day.

Also during the early morning of 18 August the D14 Local Force Battalion and a company from the 275th Regiment attacked southeast Tây Ninh but were held back from the center by Regional and Popular forces and police. At dawn Companies A and B, 4/23rd Infantry moved from Firebase Rawlins III (11.292°N 106.187°E) to southeast Tây Ninh, and the ARVN Task Force 2-34 was deployed to the southwest. Once these blocking forces were in position the Regional and Popular Forces within the city began pushing the PAVN back to the south and by nightfall the D14 Battalion had withdrawn southeast away from the city.

At 09:30 on 18 August, 8 km southeast of Tây Ninh the 275th Regiment ambushed Troop A, 3rd Squadron, 4th Cavalry Regiment on Route 239 in the Cau Khoi Plantation. Company A, 1st Battalion, 5th Infantry Regiment, was dispatched south down Route 26 and attacked the VC flank, killing 34. US casualties totaled four dead and 17 wounded.

At midday on 18 August Company B 1/5th Infantry engaged a two battalion strong PAVN unit in the Bến Củi Rubber Plantation northeast of Tây Ninh. Company C 1/5th Infantry and its reconnaissance platoon were sent to reinforce Company B and with artillery and air support by 16:00 they had scattered the enemy force who left behind 92 dead, a field radio and three .50-caliber machine guns. Captured documents showed that the force comprised a battalion from the 33rd Regiment and the D24 Anti-Aircraft Battalion.

On the morning of 19 August, 1/5th Infantry regained contact with the 33rd Regiment in the Bến Củi Plantation. Companies B and C and the reconnaissance platoon, engaged PAVN who had reoccupied their previous fighting positions. After several M113 armored personnel carriers became bogged down the US advance halted and by dusk the 33rd Regiment withdrew further into the plantation. US losses were two killed and 24 wounded.

At 18:45 on 19 August, the 33rd Regiment ambushed a column of Company B 1/5th Infantry and Troop A 3/4th Cavalry as they moved along Route 239 through the Bến Củi Plantation towards Dầu Tiếng Base Camp. B-40 and recoilless rifle fire knocked out the two leading vehicles and Company B established a defensive position north of the road while artillery and air strikes were called in. At 20:45 a troop from the 3/44th Cavalry attacked the enemy flank allowing the column to disengage and move east, fighting its way through further ambushes with B-40s knocking out two M48s and two M113s. US losses were eight killed and 44 wounded while PAVN losses were estimated to be more than 200.

On the early morning of 20 August, a night ambush platoon from Company A, 2/27th Infantry, 2 km north of Tây Ninh Combat Base spotted a unit of VC. On engaging the unit with their personal weapons, the return fire indicated that they were facing a VC battalion. Air and artillery support was called in while the platoon fought to prevent the VC from overrunning their position. The VC withdrew at dawn leaving 155 dead, US losses were five killed and six wounded.

On the morning of 20 August, Company B, 4/23rd Infantry, was ambushed by elements of the 275th Regiment on Route 26 through the Cau Khoi Plantation. Company A deployed south down Route 26 from Firebase Rawlins III and the combined force made the VC disengage leaving 28 dead. US losses were four dead and seven wounded.

On the morning of 21 August as Company C and the reconnaissance platoon of 1/5th Infantry patrolled the northwest of the Bến Củi Plantation they were engaged by the 33rd Regiment. The PAVN aggressively closed on the US force sending in two battalions of infantry and knocking out the six lead M113s with B-40 rockets. The unit withdrew killing 182 VC for the loss of 18 US killed and 23 wounded. S. Sgt. Marvin R. Young would be posthumously awarded the Medal of Honor for taking command of his platoon after the commander had been killed and covering its withdrawal.

On the afternoon of 21 August Troop A 3/4th Cavalry and Company A 4/23rd Infantry, clashed with VC again in the Cau Khoi Plantation. US losses were three killed and five wounded.

On the night of 21 August the PAVN/VC launched simultaneous attacks on Firebases Buell II and Rawlins III. The 174th Regiment attacked Firebase Buell II which was defended by Companies C and D, 3/22nd Infantry, the attack was repulsed at a cost of 60 PAVN/VC killed and 11 wounded soldiers captured. US losses were 3 killed and 18 wounded. The 3rd Battalion, 275th Regiment attacked Firebase Rawlins III which was defended by Companies A and B, 4/23rd Infantry, the attack was repulsed at a cost of 25 PAVN/VC killed and four wounded soldiers captured. US losses were one killed and ten wounded.

On the morning of 22 August on Route 239 in the Bến Củi Plantation, Company B, 1/5th Infantry, reengaged elements of the 33rd Regiment killing 24 PAVN/VC for the loss of four US dead and 16 wounded.

On 22 August, 25th Infantry Division commander MG Ellis W. Williamson instructed his 2nd Brigade to move north to Dầu Tiếng and on 23 August the 2nd Brigade established its headquarters there and assumed operational control over 1/5th Infantry. Troop A, 3/4th Cavalry, and the 1st and 2nd Battalions, 27th Infantry, each minus one company were also placed under 2nd Brigade operational control. These reinforcements allowed the 1st Brigade to focus its efforts on the areas immediately surrounding Tây Ninh. The 2nd Brigade commander sent a task force comprising Companies A, B and D of the 2/27th Infantry, supported by elements of Troop A, 3/4th Cavalry to construct a new firebase named Schofield (11.253°N 106.285°E) on Route 239 halfway between the Bến Củi and Cau Khoi Plantations. The firebase became operational that evening, with two 105-mm. howitzer units, Battery A, 1st Battalion, 8th Artillery Regiment and Battery C 7th Battalion, 11th Artillery. After midnight on 24 August two battalions from the 33rd Regiment attacked Firebase Schofield in a four hour long assault. PAVN/VC losses were 103 dead and an unusually large number of weapons were captured including four machine guns, four 60-mm. mortar tubes, two recoilless rifles and 11 B-40 launchers. US losses were nine dead and 41 wounded, four M113s and two M48s were destroyed.

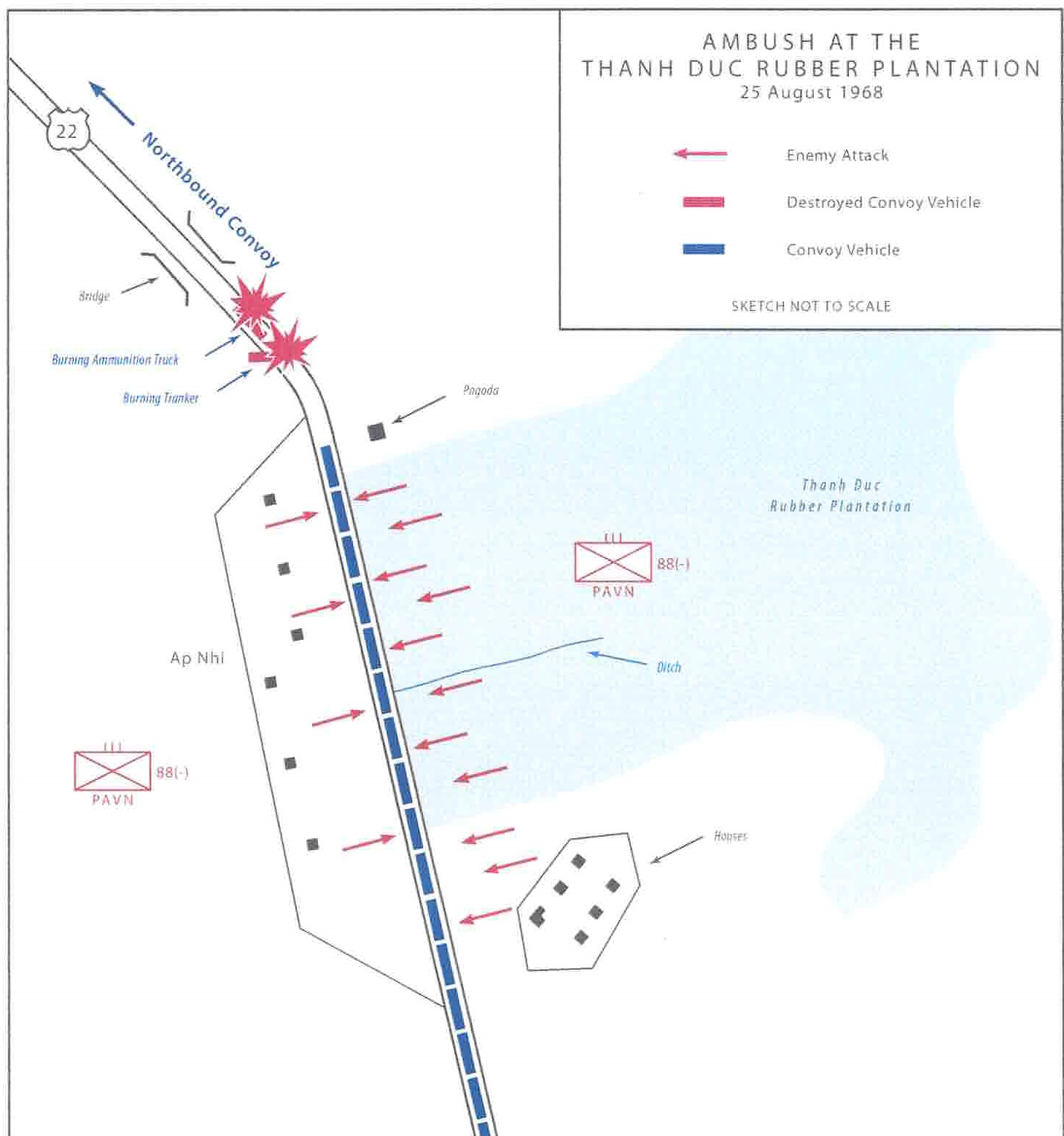
Thanh Duc Plantation ambush, 25 August 1968

On the afternoon of 25 August, an 89 vehicle supply convoy manned by troops from the 6th and 7th Transportation Battalions escorted by military police in gun-jeeps was moving along Highway 22 towards Tây Ninh Combat Base. As the convoy passed by the Thanh Duc Rubber Plantation approximately 10 km southeast of Tây Ninh they observed troops in ARVN uniforms in the trees to the east. The troops were actually the PAVN 88th Regiment in stolen uniforms who then opened fire on the convoy hitting it with mortars, B-40 rockets and machine gun fire. The lead vehicles were able to escape the ambush and sped north towards Tây Ninh, but an oil tanker was hit and burst into flames blocking the road for the 58 vehicles behind it. The drivers and MPs dismounted and returned fire from behind their vehicles or along the roadside. A relief force from the 4/23rd Infantry was sent to the ambush site with elements approaching from the north and south. At 14:00 Troop B 3/4th Cavalry, arrived at the southern end of the plantation and half the force was sent into the plantation to attack the PAVN left flank, while the others were sent to secure the convoy. At 14:15 helicopters landed Company C, 3/22nd Infantry, at the northern end of the ambush and they proceeded to attack the PAVN right flank. The counterattacks forced the PAVN deeper into the plantation and those vehicles that could move were sent north to Tây Ninh, while another 20 damaged vehicles awaited recovery. The PAVN withdrew as darkness fell and when US forces swept the plantation the next day they found 103 PAVN dead among the destroyed bunkers, US losses were 21 dead and 22 vehicles destroyed. For his actions during this battle Sgt. William W. Seay would be posthumously awarded the Medal of Honor.

After midnight on 27 August, the 275th Regiment attacked Firebase Rawlins III. The attack was easily repulsed by the defending 4/23rd Infantry who killed 58 PAVN and captured two wounded prisoners, three machine guns and five B-40 launchers for the loss of only eight wounded.

On 11 September the offensive against Tây Ninh was renewed when the 271st Regiment fired 200 mortar rounds at Firebase Buell II before launching an attack that was repulsed by the 3/22nd Infantry. PAVN/VC losses were nine killed, US losses were 17 wounded. Shortly afterwards the D14 Battalion attacked three Regional/Popular Forces posts to the north of Tây Ninh, opening a route for the 271st Regiment into the city. The Province Chief called for assistance and the ARVN 6th Airborne Battalion and an artillery battery were flown into the hamlet of Ven Ven on Highway 22, while the South Vietnamese 2nd and 3rd Marine Battalions and another artillery battery were flown in to set up another firebase 8 km further east. On the evening of 11 September the ARVN 3rd Airborne Brigade and the 4th Marine Battalion were landed by helicopter in the northeast suburbs of Tây Ninh to clear the area. When the PAVN/VC withdrew the following morning they left 21 dead.

Also on 11 September a battalion from the 275th Regiment attacked the position of Company A, 1/5th Infantry, of the 25th Infantry Division on the west of the Bến Củi Plantation. The attack continued throughout the night and Companies B and C and Company B, 3/22nd Infantry were sent to support Company A. The PAVN/VC withdrew at dawn leaving 100 dead, US losses were three killed and 18 wounded.

On 12 September the PAVN 88th Regiment, attempted a repeat of the 25 August ambush on Highway 22, 3 km north of that ambush site. The targeted convoy comprised 19 vehicles from the 48th Transportation Group including one M48 and an M113. The initial fire disabled a vehicle in the middle of the convoy and its crew and those of the following four vehicles dismounted and engaged the PAVN, while the front section drove north and the rear section pulled back from the ambush site. 25th Infantry Division M113s operating nearby quickly arrived at the ambush site as did helicopter gunships. The PAVN withdrew leaving 18 dead, while US losses were only one vehicle destroyed.

On 13 September, the 3rd Battalion, 272d Regiment attacked Firebase Buell II. After a 600-round mortar barrage the infantry attacked the base but were easily repulsed leaving 76 dead for no US losses. The VC retreated west taking refuge in a hamlet southwest of Tây Ninh where they were engaged late that day by the ARVN 2nd Airborne Battalion who killed 150 VC for the loss of nine dead and 17 wounded.

On 14 September, Company B, 4/23rd Infantry, engaged the 1st Battalion, 272nd Regiment 12 km east of Tây Ninh, killing 33 PAVN/VC. While patrolling Route 239 6 km west of Dầu Tiếng a 1/5th Infantry unit engaged a unit of the 275th Regiment killing 25 PAVN/VC.

Between 16 and 20 September, units from the 275th Regiment attacked 1/5th Infantry outposts in and around the Bến Củi Plantation losing more than 20 killed for no US losses. The 174th Regiment attacked units from the 4/23rd Infantry and the 3/22d Infantry near the Cau Khoi Plantation with no US losses.

After midnight on 20 September the 1st Battalion, 272nd Regiment, attacked a Regional Forces outpost in Phước Tân hamlet, 20 km west of Tay Ninh City, losing 35 killed in the brief assault. The 1st Marine Battalion was deployed to Phước Tân later that day to defend against any renewed assault. That evening the 271st Regiment attacked, the assault was repelled with air and artillery support, killing 128 VC with six captured. The ARVN 8th Airborne Battalion was also deployed to Phước Tân and on the night of 27 September the 272nd Regiment attacked again losing 150 killed.

==== Lộc Ninh ====
On the morning of 19 August PAVN 7th Division mortar crews shelled the Lộc Ninh Special Forces Camp. At dawn the 2nd Squadron, 11th Armored Cavalry Regiment, was sent to locate the PAVN and that afternoon they engaged the 5th and 6th Battalions, 165th Regiment, in the rubber plantations southwest of Lộc Ninh in a running two day battle. PAVN losses were 32 dead and 20 captured, while US losses were four dead and 31 wounded, with two M113s destroyed.

On 20 August, the 1st Battalion, 2nd Infantry Regiment was flown into Lộc Ninh to support the 2/11th ACR. Over the next four days the US forces engaged the 165th Regiment southwest of Lộc Ninh and then a battalion from the 320th Regiment northeast of Lộc Ninh, killing more than 200 PAVN for the loss of 12 US killed. On 25 August the PAVN units began withdrawing into their sanctuaries in Cambodia.

On the morning of 11 September the PAVN renewed the offensive by mortaring Lộc Ninh Special Forces Camp and the 1/2nd Infantry's adjacent base. At dawn two companies from 1/2nd Infantry began a sweep east of Lộc Ninh to locate the mortar positions. The infantry companies were engaged by entrenched PAVN 2 km east of Lộc Ninh losing five killed and 10 wounded before withdrawing. The next morning the 1st Battalion, 28th Infantry Regiment was flown into Lộc Ninh and three companies were sent in separate columns towards Hill 222 (11.888°N 106.629°E), 6 km north of the town. Around midday the columns were engaged by a battalion size PAVN force which they were only able to overcome with air and artillery support and the arrival of Troop E 2/11th ACR killing 121 PAVN and capturing three individual and nine crew-served weapons. Meanwhile, Companies C and D, 1/2nd Infantry headed east again, finding the PAVN bunkers deserted before coming upon and even larger occupied bunker complex 5 km east of Lộc Ninh which they were unable to capture despite air and artillery support. On 13 September the PAVN attacked Companies C and D to cover the withdrawal of the rest of their unit. After repelling this attack Companies C and D pursued the PAVN further east and at 13:00 they engaged the fresh 4th Battalion, 320th Regiment. Troop E, 2/11th ACR was sent to support the 1/2nd Infantry and the PAVN disengaged. Also on 13 September at Hill 222 the 1/28th Infantry, got into position to assault the hill, while three companies from the 2nd Battalion, 16th Infantry Regiment were landed in blocking positions east of the hill. At 13:00 as the helicopter carrying 1st Infantry Division commander MG Keith L. Ware flew in to observe the assault on Hill 222 it was hit by anti-aircraft fire 5 km south of Lộc Ninh and crashed killing all eight on board. The initial assault on Hill 222 was repulsed by intense PAVN fire and 1/28th Infantry was withdrawn to allow for more air and artillery preparation, but a follow-up attack was similarly repulsed and the PAVN launched their own counterattacks before the fighting ended as darkness fell. On the morning of 14 September, Companies B and C, 1/2nd Infantry, marched north to join the attack at Hill 222, but when the assault resumed later that day they found that the PAVN had abandoned the position overnight. Staff sergeant Terry P. Richardson of Company A, 1st Battalion, 28th Infantry would be awarded the Medal of Honor in 2026 for his actions on 14 September.

==== Saigon ====
On the night of 21–22 August, 22 122-mm. rockets hit Saigon, in the first such attack for two months. 17 civilians were killed and 69 wounded. One of the rockets hit the National Assembly building, causing severe damage.

=== IV Corps ===
On the night of 21–22 August VC units attacked 75 targets across IV Corps (South Vietnam). Of those attacks, 39 were attacks by fire and only seven of the ground attacks involved more than a single company. At Bến Tre an assault by the 516th and 550th Battalions was repulsed by the ARVN. On 24 August, the 263rd and 514A Battalions assaulted a district headquarters in Mỹ Tho Province, but their mortar crews hit their own infantry when their mortar baseplates sank into swampy ground.

== Aftermath ==
By the end of August, the US claimed that the PAVN/VC had lost approximately 8,700 killed in the offensive. General Abrams told his subordinates on 24 August that "He’s [the PAVN/VC] a prisoner of his own damn strategy, and he can’t find a good way out. He can’t admit it–that’s impossible for him." Abrams correctly predicted that the PAVN/VC would stagger their attacks across the various fronts to keep the offensive going for as long as possible, but that their strategy was hopeless given their declining capabilities.

The US claimed that the PAVN/VC lost 16,578 soldiers in August and a further 13,163 in September, while US losses over the same period were over 700 dead and an unknown number of ARVN/Allied troops although not all of these were involved in the Phase III offensive. MACV regarded the offensive as a "dismal failure" that had "foundered from the outset" indicating that the PAVN were approaching exhaustion.
