= USNS Hope =

USNS Hope is a U.S. Navy ship name. It may refer to:

- USNS Bob Hope (T-AKR-300), lead ship of the Bob Hope-class vehicle cargo ship
- USS Hope (AH-7), a Comfort-class hospital ship
- SS Hope, a Haven-class hospital ship

== See also ==
- USS Hope, a U.S. Navy ship name
- Bob Hope-class vehicle cargo ship
