= 1st Division (Vietnam) =

1st Infantry Division
- Active: 1965-1974
- Disbanded: 1974
- Allegiance: Vietnam
- Branch: People's Army of Vietnam
- Type: Infantry
- Size: Division
- Engagements: Battle of Dak To; Battle of Duc Lap; Easter Offensive in Mekong Delta

Commanders
- Notable commanders: COL Nguyễn Hữu An; COL Trần Văn Trân

The 1st Infantry Division was a division of the People's Army of Vietnam (PAVN), first formed from PAVN units in 1965.

== Vietnam War ==
The Division was formed on 20 December 1965 from three PAVN Regiments: 32nd (aka 320th), 33rd (aka 101B), and 66th (66A), under the control of the PAVN B3 Front in the Central Highlands.

The Division's 33rd and 66th Regiments were engaged in the Battle of Ia Drang from 14-18 November 1965, losing 1070-1753 killed.

In January 1966, the Division's formation consisted of three regiments - 320th, 66th and 88th - under commander Nguyễn Hữu An and commissar Hoàng Thế Thiện.

The Division was the target of Operation Paul Revere from 10 May to 1 August 1966, losing 546 killed and 68 captured.

The Division's 33rd Regiment and the independent 95B Regiment were the target of Operation Paul Revere IV from 20 October to 30 December 1966, losing an estimated 120 killed.

The Division and the 95B Regiment were the target of Operation Sam Houston from 12 February to 5 April 1967, losing 733 killed.

The Division was the target of Operation Francis Marion from 6 April to 11 October 1967, losing 1,530 killed. During the operation, the 88th Regiment received orders to march to the South, while the 174th Regiment was deployed from the North to replace it.

The Division was engaged in the Battle of Dak To from 3 to 23 November 1967, with three regiments (320th, 66A and 174th) under commander Nguyễn Hữu An and commissar Hoàng Thế Thiện. Supported by two B3 Front's independent regiments (the 24th and 33rd), the division carried out fierce close-quarters combat with the US 4th Infantry Division and 173rd Airborne Brigade. The division suffered 1,000-1,600 killed, while US forces sustained approximately 300-400 fatalities.

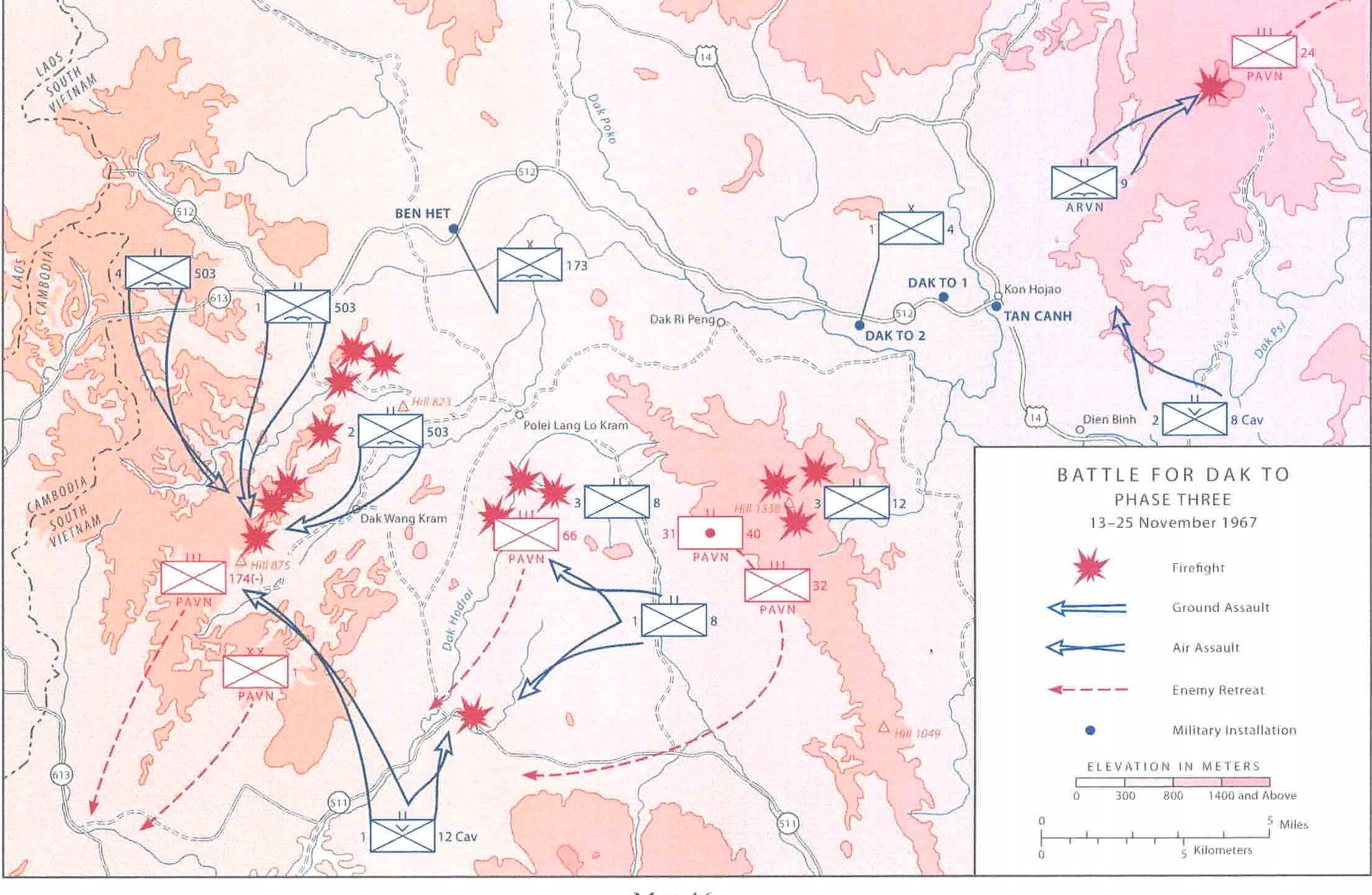
Battle of Dak To Phase 3, 13-25 November 1967

During Phase I of the Tet Offensive 1968, the 66th and 174th Regiments attacked Ben Het Camp, Tân Cảnh Base Camp and attempted to cut Highway 14 between Dak To and Kontum. The 174th's attack on Tân Cảnh took place on 30 January but by the end of the day they had been repelled for the loss of over 300 killed. On 8 February, the 174th attacked Tân Cảnh again and were repulsed for the loss of 150 killed. The 32nd attempted to cut Highway 19 at Thanh An on 1 February, losing 275 soldiers in the attack. Allied forces located its base camp on 5 February and killed a further 35 soldiers.

In March 1968, the 209th Regiment of the 312th Division marched from the North to the Central Highlands to replace the 320th Regiment in the Division formation.

Following Phase I of the Tet Offensive, Nguyễn Hữu An was appointed Chief of Staff of B3 Front, Vương Tuấn Kiệt replaced him as the division commander. In April 1968, the 325C Division, comprising two regiments (95C and 101D) under commander Chu Phương Đới and commissar Trần Văn Ân arrived the Central Highlands to relieve the 1st Division on Route 18 - west of Kontum.

In August 1968, as part of the Phase III Offensive, the Division was tasked with seizing Buôn Ma Thuột city in Darlak province. Being discovered by the Allied forces while assembling its all three regiments: 66th, 209th, and 95C (aka E2) around Buôn Ma Thuột, the Division changed their objective to Duc Lap Camp and nearby Duc Lap Sub Sector HQ while kept threatening the city. During the Battle of Duc Lap from 24 to 27 August, the Division's 66th Regiment lost more than 700 killed.

In 1969, the Division, now comprising the 209th, 95C and 101C (or 101D) Regiments under Sen. Col. Trần Văn Trân, was sent to the Southeastern Region of B2 Front; joining with the Central Highlands (B3 Front) and Central Lowlands (B1 Front) veteran regiments - 33rd (101B), 174th (174A), 10th (95A) and 20th (18B) - which had already been present in the region since 1968.

During the Easter Offensive in southern Cambodia and the Mekong Delta the Division was the only full PAVN division engaged in the fighting with three regiments in its formation: the 101D, 52nd (E46), and E44. The Division suffered heavy losses in the fighting at Kompong Trach, Cambodia from 22 March to the end of April and then was unable to achieve its objectives in the Mekong Delta.
