= August Offensive =

August Offensive may refer to:

- Battle of Sari Bair, the final British offensive of the Gallipoli Campaign from 6-21 August 1915
- Phase III offensive, the third phase of the Tet Offensive, in Vietnam, from 17 August to 27 September 1968
