= Leroy A. Mendonca =

United States Army Medal of Honor recipient

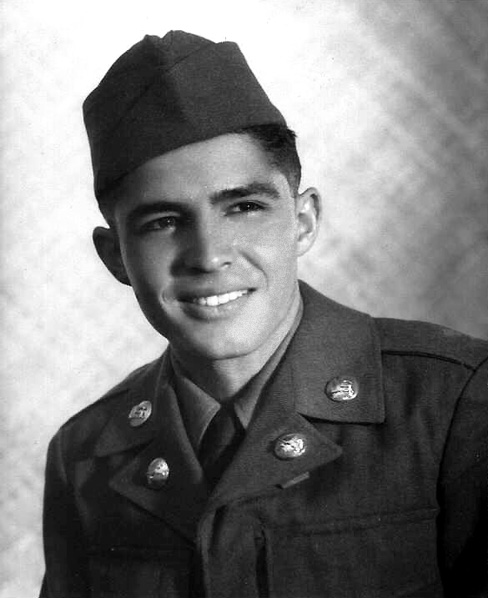
- Sergeant Mendonca
- Born: August 2, 1932; Honolulu, Hawaii
- Died: July 4, 1951 (aged 18) near Chich-on, Korea
- Burial place: National Memorial Cemetery of the Pacific, Honolulu, Hawaii
- Military career
- Allegiance: United States of America
- Branch: United States Army
- Rank: Sergeant
- Units: Company B, 7th Infantry Regiment, 3rd Infantry Division
- Conflicts: Korean War (DOW)
- Awards: Medal of Honor; Purple Heart

Leroy A. Mendonca (August 2, 1932 – July 4, 1951) was a soldier in the United States Army during the Korean War. He posthumously received the Medal of Honor for his actions on July 4, 1951.

== Early life ==
Leroy was born in Honolulu, Territory of Hawaii, on 2 August 1932, and was of Portuguese ancestry. While attending President William McKinley High School, he was an AJROTC cadet, and graduated in 1950.

== Medal of Honor citation ==
Rank and organization: Sergeant, U.S. Army, Company B, 7th Infantry Regiment, 3rd Infantry Division

Place and date: Near Chich-on, Korea, July 4, 1951,

Entered service at: Honolulu, T.H. Birth: Honolulu, T.H.

G.O. No.: 83, September 3, 1952

Citation:

Sgt. LeRoy A. Mendonca, distinguished himself by conspicuous gallantry above and beyond the call of duty in action against the enemy. After his platoon, in an exhaustive fight, had captured Hill 586, the newly won positions were assaulted during the night by a numerically superior enemy force. When the 1st Platoon positions were outflanked and under great pressure and the platoon was ordered to withdraw to a secondary line of defense, Sgt. Mendonca voluntarily remained in an exposed position and covered the platoon's withdrawal. Although under murderous enemy fire, he fired his weapon and hurled grenades at the onrushing enemy until his supply of ammunition was exhausted. He fought on, clubbing with his rifle and using his bayonet until he was mortally wounded. After the action it was estimated that Sgt. Mendonca had accounted for 37 enemy casualties. His daring actions stalled the crushing assault, protecting the platoon's withdrawal to secondary positions, and enabling the entire unit to repel the enemy attack and retain possession of the vital hilltop position. Sgt. Mendonca's extraordinary gallantry and exemplary valor are in keeping with the highest traditions of the U.S. Army.

== Honors ==
In 2001, the Bob Hope-class roll on roll off vehicle cargo ship USNS Mendonca was commissioned in the Military Sealift Command, and named in honor of Sergeant Mendonca.

== See also ==
- List of Medal of Honor recipients
- List of Korean War Medal of Honor recipients
