= Camp Livingston =

U.S. Army military camp during World War II in Louisiana

Coordinates: 31.444244°N 92.362232°W

Camp Livingston was a U.S. Army military camp during World War II. It was located on the border between Rapides and Grant Parishes, near Pineville, 12 mi (19 km) north of Alexandria, Louisiana.

== History ==
Camp Livingston was open from 1940 to 1945, and was first known as Camp Tioga. It was renamed Camp Livingston in honor of Chancellor Robert R. Livingston, a negotiator of the Louisiana Purchase and the brother of Edward Livingston, a US Senator and later the country's Secretary of State. It was home to many divisions (see List, below) and others during the war. In 1941 there was an aviation squadron of 250 African American men in the Army Air Corps performing service functions.

In fall 1941, prior to United States involvement in World War II, the camp was part of the Louisiana Maneuvers, a 400,000-man training exercise involving two imaginary countries fighting each other. The two armies faced each other across the Red River, over 3,400 square miles (8,800 km^{2}) of land, including part of East Texas.

Camp Livingston was designated as a garrison for infantry divisions. The 38th Infantry Division was known as the "Avengers of Bataan" and the 86th Infantry Division was the first American unit to cross the Danube River in Germany. Over 500,000 troops trained on the 47,000-acre (190 km^{2}) base during the war. On some old concrete walls in the site, beautiful artwork and graffiti has been discovered and is thought by locals in the area who have personally seen these drawings to have been drawn by Italian, or more likely German POWs - judging by the uniforms depicted in the artwork. They are very well drawn chalk portraits of what appears to be German soldiers - from the appearance of the uniforms portrayed.

An "Infantry Advanced Replacement Training Center" that provided six weeks of infantry training to men from inactivated antiaircraft and tank destroyer units was active at Camp Livingston from 13 November 1944 until 24 March 1945, when it was converted into a standard infantry replacement training center that gave fifteen weeks of basic infantry training to newly inducted men. After the end of World War II in Europe, in May 1945, the United States Congress passed a law stating that men under the age of nineteen had to have six months of military training before being sent overseas. Around the same time, the seventeen-week basic infantry training program that was in place prior to late December 1944 was restored. As a result, Camp Livingston, along with Camp Gordon, Georgia was re-converted to an Infantry Advanced Replacement Training Center in order to give either nine or eleven weeks of additional training to men under the age of nineteen who were graduates of the interim fifteen-week or restored seventeen-week training programs at the standard infantry replacement training centers.

During World War II, thousands of Japanese, German and Italian prisoners of war were kept in internment camps at Camp Livingston and Camp Claiborne. In 1942, the United States' first Japanese POW Kazuo Sakamaki arrived at Camp Livingston. Sakamaki was the only surviving crewman of a mini-submarine used in the attack on Pearl Harbor; he was captured by Corporal David Akui after abandoning his sub, which had run aground. The internees at the camps were used to supply logging and farm labor in the area. There was a POW cemetery located within Camp Livingston, and in 1947 the headstones were relocated to Fort Sam Houston, Texas; the bodies of the POWs were left in unmarked graves, where they remain today.

The camp also held between 800 and 1,100 US civilians of Japanese ancestry who were interned as potential fifth columnists after Pearl Harbor. Most of these men remained in confinement throughout the war, despite a lack of evidence to prove they posed a threat to homefront security.

Camp Livingston was deactivated in late 1945 and is now part of the Kisatchie National Forest.

== Today ==
The US Forest Service manages the property where the camp was previously located, and some of the original concrete streets can be accessed as some are used on a daily basis for traffic passing through the camp. The footings from many of the buildings are still in place as well as most of the original parking lots and parade areas. At least two of the swimming pools can be located and one of those up until recent years was used as an unauthorized civilian shooting range. The US Forest Service also maintains the Little Creek and Hickman Trails, which are multiple-use trail systems utilized by ATV enthusiasts throughout the area. The original water treatment plant that was built to serve the camp is still in operation today, and is now operated by Water Works District No. 3 in Rapides Parish.

== List of units stationed at Camp Livingston ==
- 28th Infantry Division
- 32nd Infantry Division
- 38th Infantry Division
- 86th Infantry Division
- 327th Military Police Escort Guard Company
- 93rd Engineer General Service Regiment
- 7th Transportation Battalion
- 240th Quartermaster Battalion
- 846th Tank Destroyer Battalion
- 46th Field Artillery Brigade
- 350th Field Artillery Group
- 351st Field Artillery Group
- 353rd Field Artillery Group
- 1692nd Engineer Combat Battalion
- 1693rd Engineer Combat Battalion
- 1694th Engineer Combat Battalion
- 527th Antiaircraft Artillery Automatic Weapons Battalion
- 510th Ordnance Heavy Maintenance Company
- 106th Cavalry Group
