= MV Leroy A. Mendonca =

Cargo ship of the United States Navy

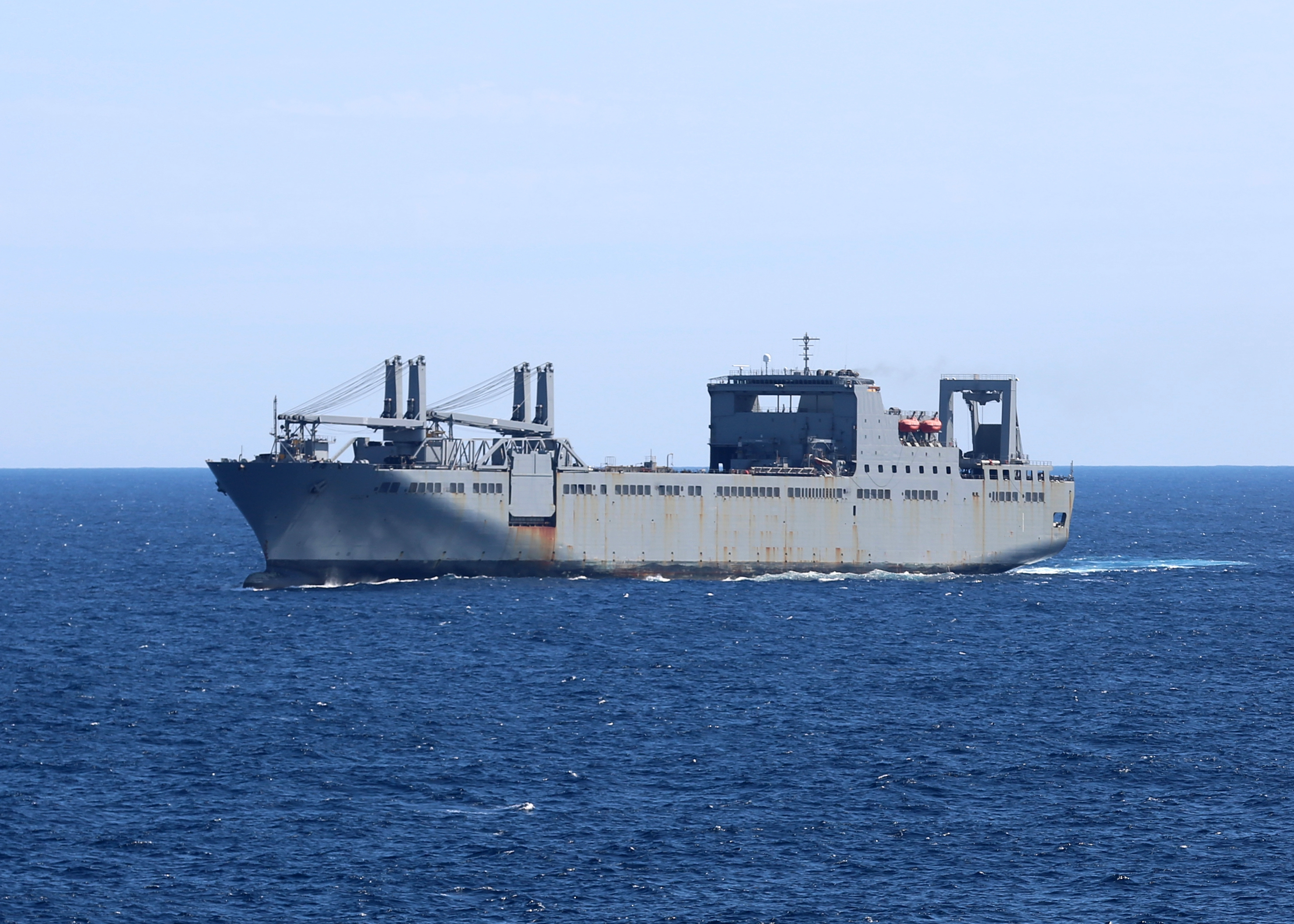
- Mendonca in the North Atlantic Ocean, 2019

History

United States
- Name: USNS Mendonca
- Operator: Military Sealift Command
- Builder: Northrop Grumman Ship Systems, New Orleans
- Laid down: 3 November 1997
- Launched: 25 May 1999
- Completed: 30 January 2001
- In service: 30 January 2001
- Out of service: 26 September 2022
- Stricken: 26 September 2022
- Identification: IMO number: 9147320; MMSI number: 338846000; Callsign: NBMK
- Status: Stricken, in Ready Reserve Force

General characteristics
- Class & type: Bob Hope-class roll on roll off vehicle cargo ship
- Displacement: 35,500 t.(lt); 62096 t.(fl)
- Length: 951 ft 5 in (290.0 m)
- Beam: 106 ft (32.3 m)
- Draft: 34 ft 10 in (10.6 m) maximum
- Propulsion: 4 × Colt Pielstick 10 PC4.2 V diesels; 65,160 hp(m) (47.89 MW)
- Speed: 24 knots (44 km/h)
- Capacity: 300,000 sq ft (28,000 m^{2}); 49,991 sq ft (4,644.3 m^{2}) deck cargo
- Complement: 26 reduced / up to 45 full, civilian mariners; 50 US Navy personnel

MV Leroy A. Mendonca, formerly USNS Mendonca (T-AKR-303), was a Bob Hope-class roll on roll off vehicle cargo ship of the United States Navy. She was built by Northrop Grumman Ship Systems, New Orleans and delivered to the Navy on 30 January 2001. They assigned her to the United States Department of Defense's Military Sealift Command. Mendonca is named for Medal of Honor recipient Sergeant Leroy A. Mendonca, and is one of 11 Surge LMSRs operated by a private company under contract to the Military Sealift Command. She was assigned to the MSC Atlantic surge force and is maintained in Ready Operational Status 4. On 26 September 2022, Mendonca left service and was stricken from the Naval Vessel Register.

On March 11, 2024, the vessel unloaded the Army's 3rd Armored Brigade Combat Team's 3000 pieces of equipment in the Greek port of Alexandroupolis.
