= 93rd Engineer General Service Regiment =

The 93rd Engineer General Service Regiment (93rd) was a segregated general services regiment of the United States Army. It was activated at Camp Livingston, Louisiana. The 93rd was one of several Army units composed entirely of Black enlisted personnel that constructed the Alaska-Canada highway.

== History ==
=== Activation and Formation ===
The 93rd was activated on 10 February 1941. Initially, the 93rd was designated as an engineer battalion. The 93rd consisted of all Black enlisted personnel and a cadre of White commissioned officers, with the exception of one Black commissioned officer, First Lieutenant Finis H. Austin. The 93rd first commander was Lieutenant Colonel John Zajicek. Many of the enlisted personnel had to be taught how to read and write in addition to learning basic soldiering skills.

=== The Louisiana-Texas Maneuvers ===
The 93rd took part in the Louisiana-Texas Maneuvers, a massive training exercise. The 93rd was tasked with building turnouts, inserting double-hinged gates, reinforcing or rebuilding bridges, building hardstands, building simulated minefields, and constructing prisoner-of-war camps. The 93rd was awarded a commendation for its demolition work and for the conduct of its motor echelon. After the conclusion of the Louisianan-Texas Maneuvers, the 93rd was responsible for cleaning up. They were tasked with rebuilding fences and smoothing fields that had been destroyed by tank tracks.

=== Louisiana to Alaska ===
==== Transition from Battalion to Regiment and Deployment ====
In November, 1941, Lt. Col. Zajicek, after becoming ill, was replaced by Captain Arthur M. Jacoby. On 6 November, the 93rd was re-designated as the 93rd General Services Regiment. The following day the 93rd was ordered to prepare for an overseas deployment.

==== Land Route ====
From Camp Livingston, the 93rd traveled to Camp Murray, Washington. While at Camp Murray the 93rd received its first regimental commander, Colonel Frank M Johnson. From Camp Murray, the 93rd made its way to Skagway, Alaska.

=== Construction of the Alaska-Canada Highway ===
==== The Supply Road ====
The 93rd was tasked with building a supply road to support the White soldiers of the 340th General Services Regiment. The supply road would start from Carcross, Yukon and end in Teslin, Yukon. On 6 May, soldiers of A company moved toward Crag Lake to begin construction of the supply road. The 93rd built seventy-three miles of road in one month and twelve days. After completing the first section of the supply road, the 93rd continued to extended the road by twenty-three miles and on 4 June they reached Tagish. From Tagish the 93rd further extended the road by thirty-three miles to Jake's Corner. On 17 June the 93rd reached Johnson's Crossing. Elements of the 93rd detached and back tracked to Jack's Corner. This detachment was tasked with building a connecting road from Jake's Corner to Whitehorse. The remainder of the 93rd continued extending the supply road from Johnson's Crossing to Nisutlin Bay.

==== New Orders ====
After reaching Nisutlin Bay, the 93rd received new orders. The 93rd was tasked with following behind the 340th as it built a single lane road and assisting with the construction of the Pioneer road. The 93rd would build and reconstruct bridges, installing culverts, grade, and widen the road. By 10 Augustc the 93rd had constructed one-hundred miles of road. By 16 October, the 93rd had constructed four bridges.

==== Completion of the Supply Road ====
In total the 93rd constructed two-hundred forty miles of road. 18 October, Command of the 93rd was transferred from Col. Johnson to Lieutenant Colonel Walter Hodge. On 10 December 1942, the 93rd ceased operations in the Yukon and on 25 December the regiment was reassigned to the Aleutians.

== Jim Crow ==
=== Louisiana ===
When the Black soldiers arrived at Camp Claiborne they were housed in a section of the camp called "Swampland," it was the least desirable area of the camp. Furthermore, the War Department believed that white southern officers were the best equipped to handle Black soldiers and would regulate them more effectively. Military police officers (MPs) not only patrolled areas of Camp Claiborne but also areas of Alexandria, Louisiana. MPs would not only enforce Army regulations but would enforce Jim Crow as well. In June 1941, a Black non-commissioned officer, Joe White, arrested by MPs and was beaten. After being taken to jail another MP assaulted him and stating, "I'm from Texas and I've been looking for a chance to whip a 'nigger' for a long time."

=== Canada ===
Not only did the Black soldiers of the 93rd experience racism in Louisiana but they also dealt with it in Canada. While stationed in Skagway, the Army forbade Black soldiers from interacting with locals and because Skagway did not have a Black post office, Black soldiers had to be escorted as a group under guard.

== Recognition ==
After the 93rd completed the supply road from Carcross to Teslin and alongside the 340th, constructed the Pioneer road, the regiment's contributions were not recognized. Even the 340th's official history failed to mention the contribution and efforts of the 93rd.

=== The Alaska Legislature ===
In 2017 the Alaska Legislature officially honored the contributions of the Black soldiers and their work in constructing the Alaska-Canada Highway.
