= Forward Operating Base 4 =

US military base in South Vietnam (1967–72)

Site information
- Type: Army
- Condition: abandoned

Location
- Coordinates: 16.007°N 108.262°E

Site history
- Built: 1967
- In use: 1967-72
- Battles/wars: Vietnam War

Garrison information
- Occupants: Military Assistance Command, Vietnam – Studies and Observations Group

Forward Operating Base 4 (also known as FOB 4) is a former Military Assistance Command, Vietnam – Studies and Observations Group (MACV-SOG) Command and Control North base. It was near the Marble Mountains southeast of Da Nang, Vietnam. Seabees from NMCB 12 built sea huts on the base in 1968.

== History ==
The base was located immediately north of the Marble Mountains and south of Marble Mountain Air Facility.

On the night of 22–23 August 1968, as part of their Phase III Offensive, a company from the Viet Cong (VC) R20 Battalion and a sapper platoon infiltrated the base, killing 17 Special Forces soldiers (their largest one-day loss of the war) and wounding another 125 allied soldiers. Thirty-two VC were killed.

== Current use ==
The base is abandoned and the area now consists of sand dunes with some commercial and residential development.
