= USNS Seay =

Cargo ship of the United States Navy

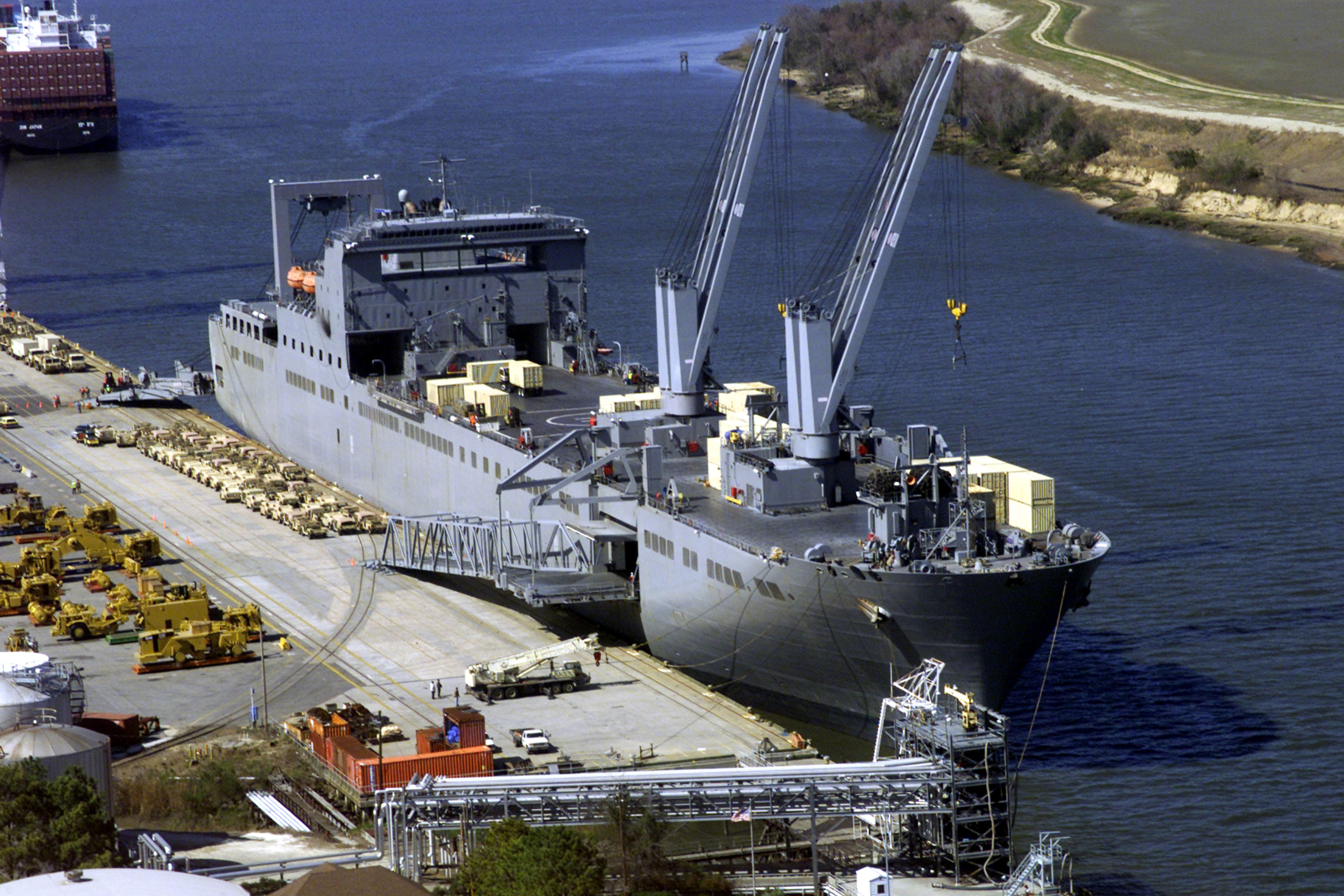

History

United States
- Name: USNS Seay
- Namesake: Army Sgt. William W. Seay
- Owner: United States Navy
- Operator: Military Sealift Command
- Awarded: September 27, 1994
- Builder: Northrop Grumman Ship Systems, New Orleans
- Laid down: March 24, 1997
- Launched: June 25, 1998
- Completed: 4 August 1998
- In service: March 28, 2000
- Identification: IMO number: 9116838; MMSI number: 338929000; Callsign: NZIN
- Motto: On Time On Target
- Status: in active service
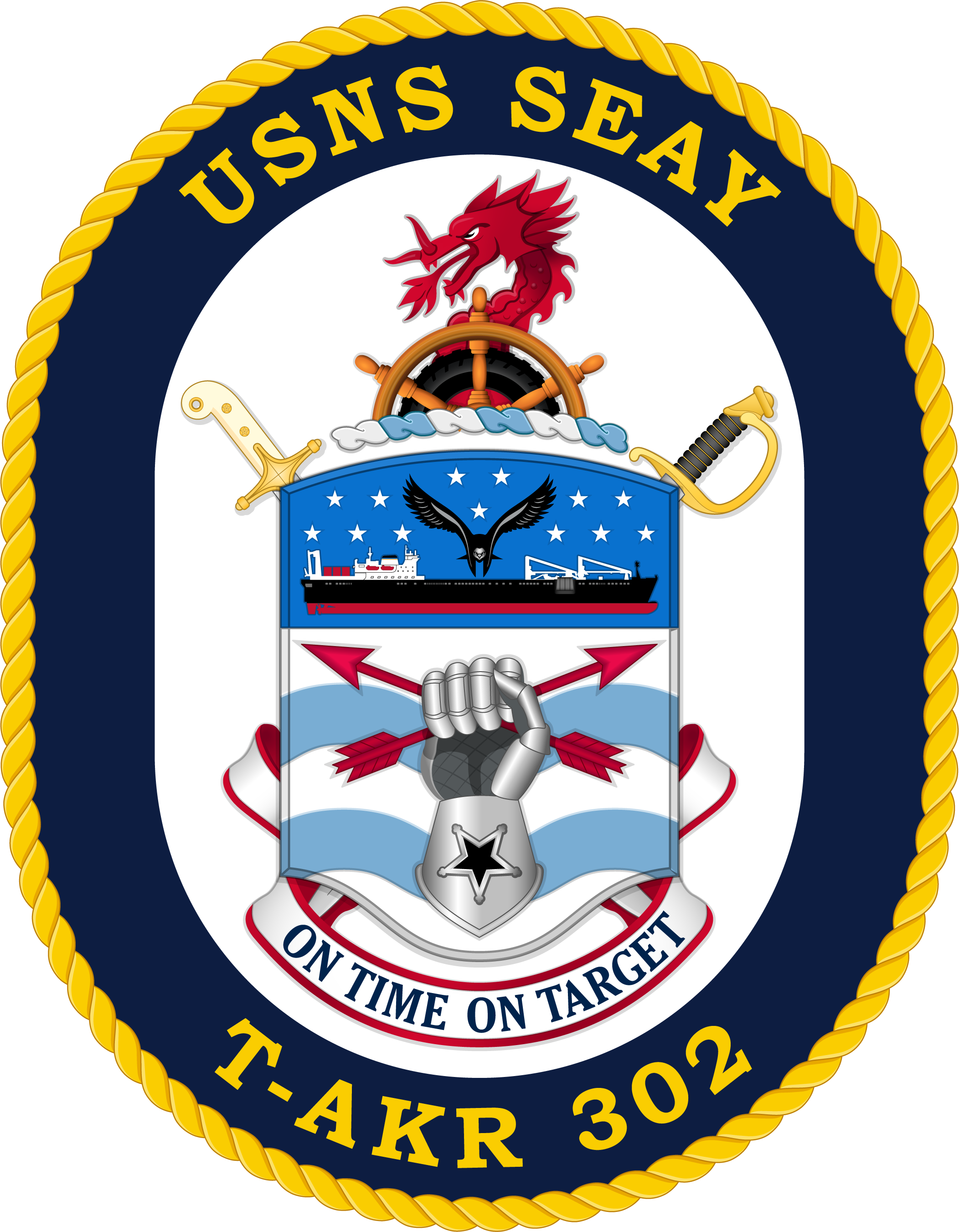
- Badge

General characteristics
- Class & type: Bob Hope-class vehicle cargo ship
- Displacement: 62,070 tons full
- Length: 951 ft 5 in (290.0 m)
- Beam: 106 ft (32.3 m)
- Draft: 34 ft 10 in (10.6 m) maximum
- Installed power: 65,160 hp(m) (47.89 MW)
- Propulsion: 4 x Colt Pielstick 10 PC4.2 V diesels; 2 × propellers
- Speed: 24 knots (44 km/h)
- Range: Not Disclosed
- Capacity: 380,000 sq ft (35,000 m^{2}) w/49,990 sq. ft. deck cargo
- Complement: 26 to 45 civilian crew; up to 50 active duty
- Armament: Unarmed
- Aviation facilities: Helicopter landing area

USNS Seay (T-AKR-302) is a Bob Hope-class roll on roll off vehicle cargo ship of the United States Navy. She is named after Sergeant William W. Seay, who received the Medal of Honor for heroism during the Vietnam War.

She was built by Northrop Grumman Ship Systems, New Orleans and delivered to the Navy on 28 March 2000. They assigned her to the United States Department of Defense's Military Sealift Command.

Seay has served in transportation efforts in both the Iraq and Afghanistan wars, mainly shuttling material between the mainland United States and European bases controlled by the US.

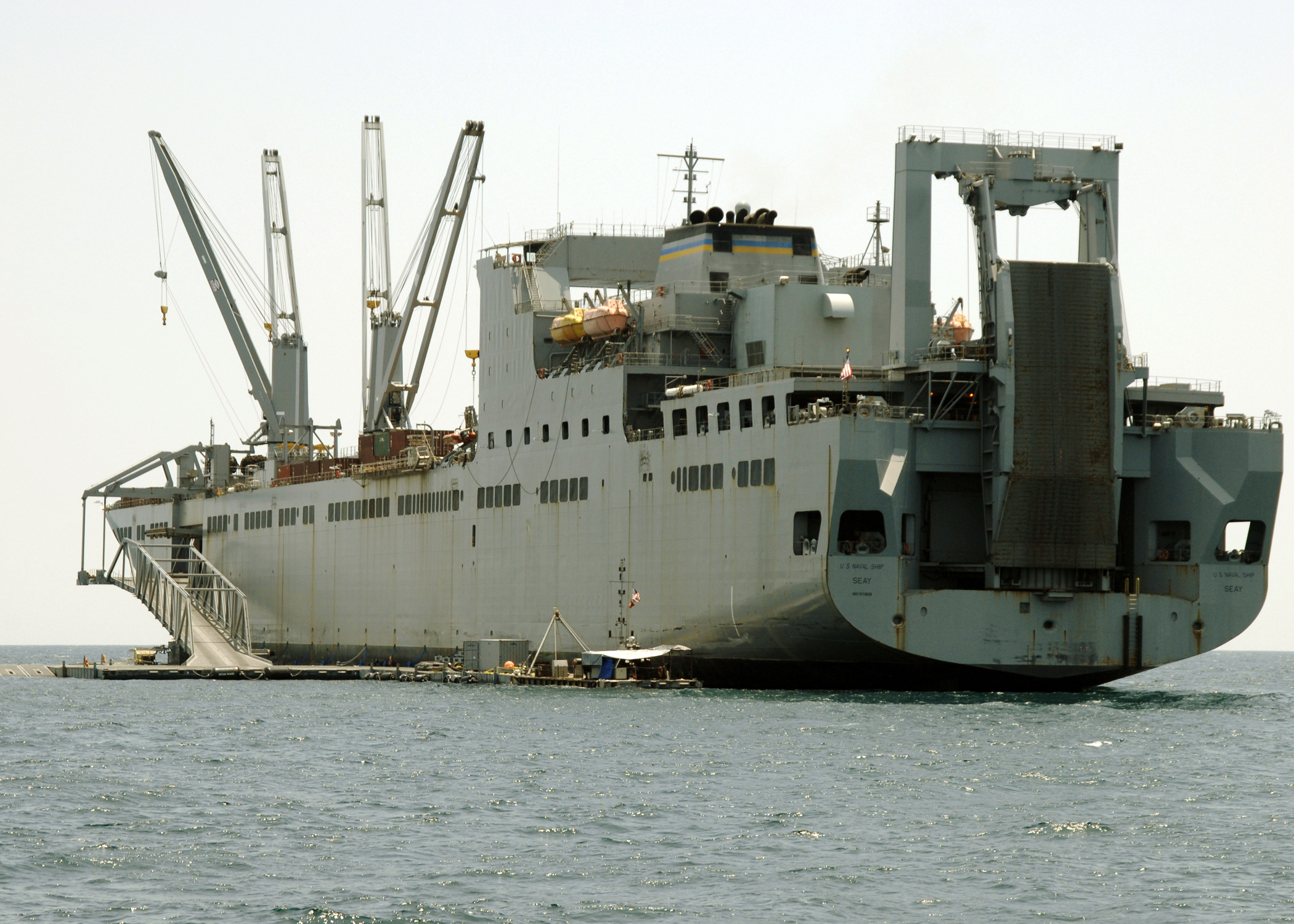
Seay at Camp Lejeune, N.C 2009

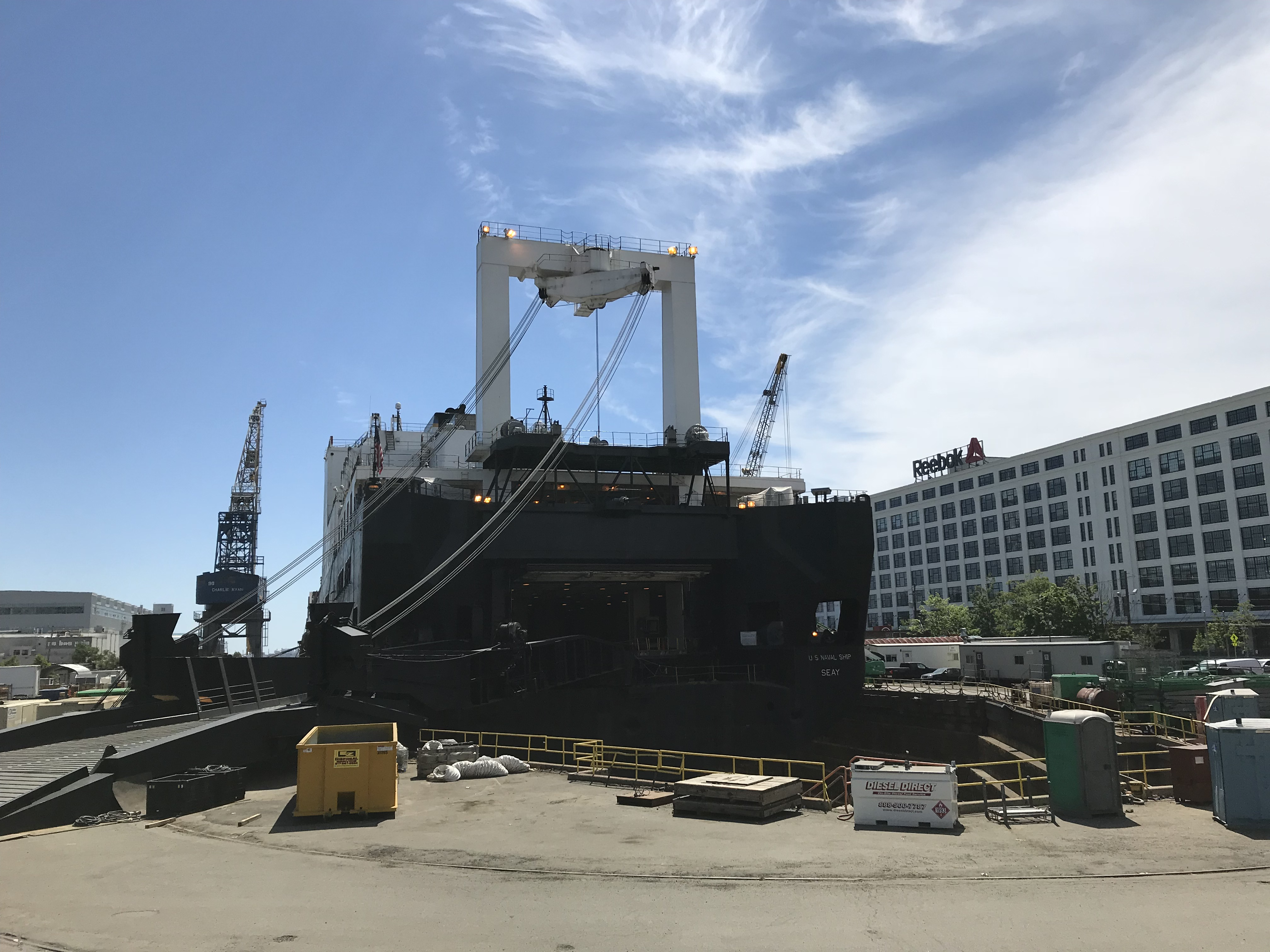
USNS T-AKR-302 Seay at the Boston Drydock for maintenance (June 10, 2018).
