= Herbert J. McChrystal =

United States Army general

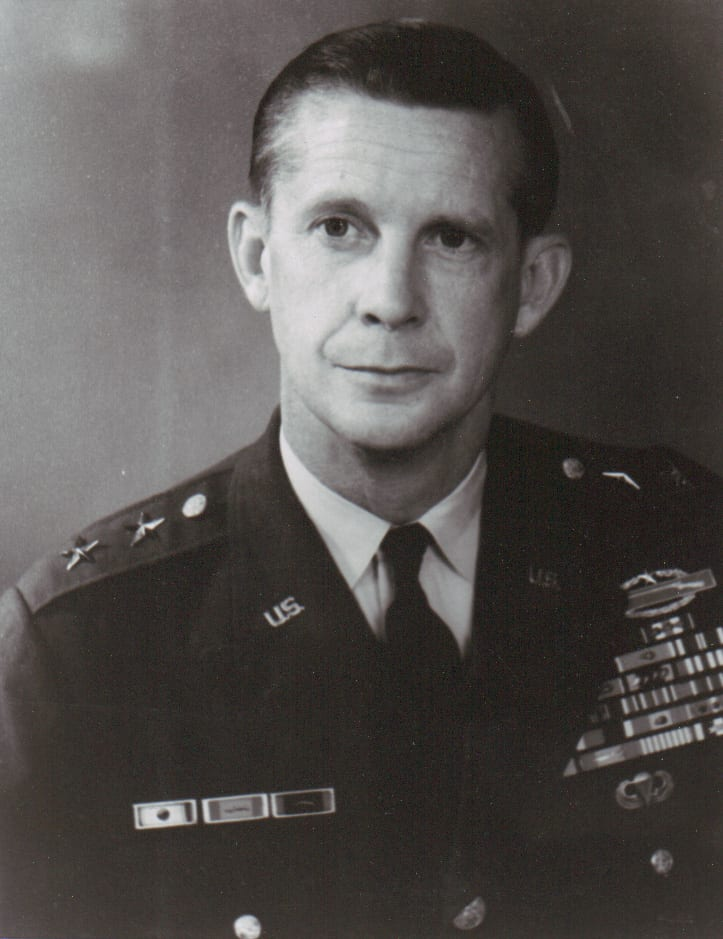
- Born: Herbert Joseph McChrystal Jr. May 30, 1924; Panama Canal Zone
- Died: December 10, 2013 (aged 89); Kingsport, Tennessee
- Relatives: General Stanley A. McChrystal (son)
- Military career
- Allegiance: United States of America
- Branch: United States Army
- Service years: 1945–1974
- Rank: Major General
- Commands: United States Army Test and Evaluation Command
- Conflicts: Korean War; Vietnam War
- Awards: Army Distinguished Service Medal; Silver Star (4); Legion of Merit (2); Distinguished Flying Cross; Bronze Star (2); Air Medal (10)
- Other work: Political-Military consultant to RAND Corporation (1974–1978)

Herbert Joseph McChrystal Jr. (May 30, 1924 – December 10, 2013) was a major general in the United States Army and the father of General Stanley A. McChrystal.

== Early years and personal life ==
Herbert Joseph McChrystal Jr. was born in 1924 in the Panama Canal Zone to Colonel Herbert McChrystal Sr. (1895–1954), who was stationed with the United States military and Hazel Marion (née Vosper) McChrystal. He married Mary Gardner Bright, with whom he had six children. Mary McChrystal died in 1971. He is a distant relative of Corporal Charles Edward McChrystal, US Army Corporal and Purple Heart recipient, who died in France during World War II.

== Career ==
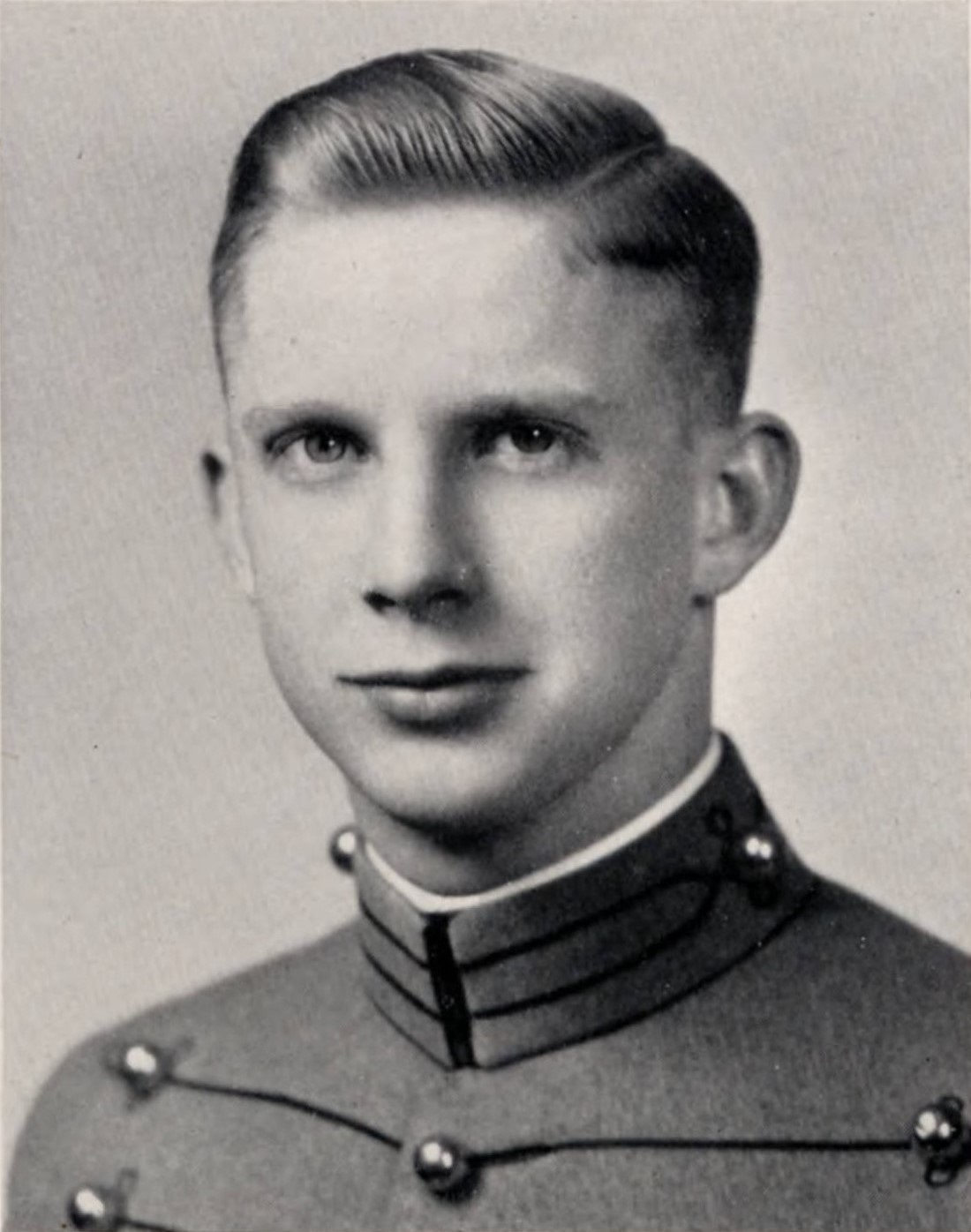
At West Point in 1945

After completing high school in Pullman, Washington, McChrystal graduated from New Mexico Military Institute Junior College in 1942 and the United States Military Academy in 1945, and was part of the occupying force in Germany after World War II.

He served a tour of duty in Korea with the 14th Infantry Regiment, part of the 25th Infantry Division, and received his first Silver Star.

McChrystal graduated from the advanced course at the Infantry School in 1952, the Command and General Staff College in 1955 and the National War College in 1965. After serving on the staff of the United States Army War College, he studied international relations at Georgetown University from August 1957 to February 1959.

He served two tours of duty in Vietnam. During his first tour, he commanded the 2nd Battalion, 18th Infantry Regiment, part of the 1st Infantry Division. His second tour was in 1968; he commanded the 2nd Brigade of the 4th Infantry Division and then was chief of staff for the 4th Infantry Division.

In the early 1970s he was director of the Planning and Program Analysis Directorate at the Pentagon. His final posting was leading the Test and Evaluation Command at Fort Hood, Texas.

He retired from the military on July 1, 1974. His decorations included the Distinguished Service Medal, four Silver Stars, two awards of the Legion of Merit, the Distinguished Flying Cross, the Bronze Star Medal with "V" device and oak leaf cluster, ten Air Medals and the Combat Infantryman Badge.

== Later life ==
After leaving the military, McChrystal spent four years as a political-military consultant to RAND Corporation, and worked for several years on the staff and faculty of the Florida Institute of Technology, where he also earned a Master of Business Administration in 1981. McChrystal taught computer courses and served as director of professional development. He founded the continuing education program at Florida Tech in 1980.

Later, he went on to form a logistics consultation firm with Nedra R. McChrystal, his third wife. They moved to Kingsport, Tennessee, in 2001.

McChrystal died on December 10, 2013, in Kingsport. He was interred at Arlington National Cemetery on June 18, 2014.

== Sources ==
- Times-News.net article on McChrystal
- Time Feb. 22, 1982
