= Bob Hope-class vehicle cargo ship =

American military ship class

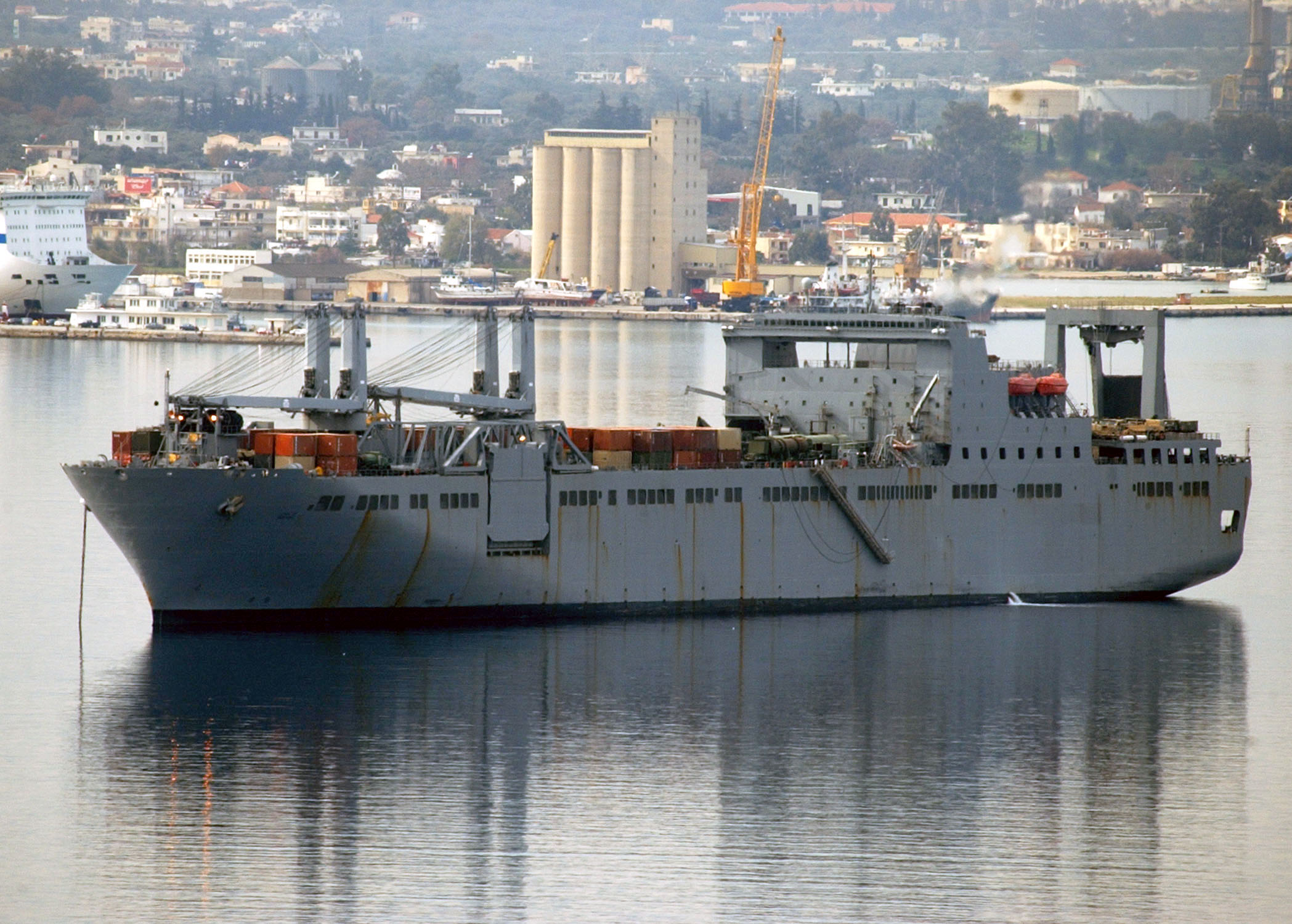
- USNS Bob Hope in harbor at Souda Bay in Crete, Greece

Class overview
- Builders: Avondale Shipyard
- Cost: US$265 million (1993) (equivalent to US$518.03 million in 2024)
- Built: 1993–2001
- In service: 1998–
- Completed: 7
- Active: 2 Active, 5 Ready Reserve Force

General characteristics
- Class & type: Large, Medium-Speed Roll-on/Roll-off
- Displacement: 62,069 tons full
- Length: 951 ft 5 in (290.0 m)
- Beam: 106 ft (32.3 m)
- Draft: 34 ft 10 in (10.6 m) maximum
- Propulsion: 4 × Colt Pielstick 10 PC4.2 V diesels; 65,160 hp (48.59 MW)
- Speed: 24 knots (44 km/h)
- Range: 15,000 miles
- Capacity: 380,000 sq ft (35,000 m^{2}), 1,000 wheeled or tracked military vehicles
- Complement: 26 to 45 civilian crew; up to 50 active duty
- Aviation facilities: Helicopter landing area

The Bob Hope-class vehicle cargo ship is a class of Large, Medium-Speed Roll-on/Roll-off cargo ship used for prepositioning of military vehicles and other materiel by the United States. The lead ship of this class is USNS Bob Hope (T-AKR-300).

== Ships ==
Ship	Hull. No.	Namesake	Laid down	Launched	Delivered	Status	Refs
Bob Hope	T-AKR 300	Bob Hope	29 May 1993	27 March 1997	18 November 1998	Stricken, Ready Reserve Force	
Fisher	T-AKR 301	Zachary Fisher	15 April 1996	21 October 1997	4 August 1999	Stricken, Ready Reserve Force	
Seay	T-AKR 302	William W. Seay	24 March 1997	25 June 1998	28 March 2000	Active	
Mendonca	T-AKR 303	Leroy A. Mendonca	3 November 1997	25 May 1999	30 January 2001	Stricken, Ready Reserve Force	
Pililaau	T-AKR 304	Herbert K. Pililaau	29 June 1998	29 January 2000	24 July 2001	Active	
Brittin	T-AKR 305	Nelson V. Brittin	3 May 1999	11 November 2000	11 July 2002	Stricken, Ready Reserve Force	
Benavidez	T-AKR 306	Roy Benavidez	15 December 1999	11 August 2001	10 September 2003	Stricken, Ready Reserve Force	
