= MV Fisher =

Cargo ship of the United States Navy

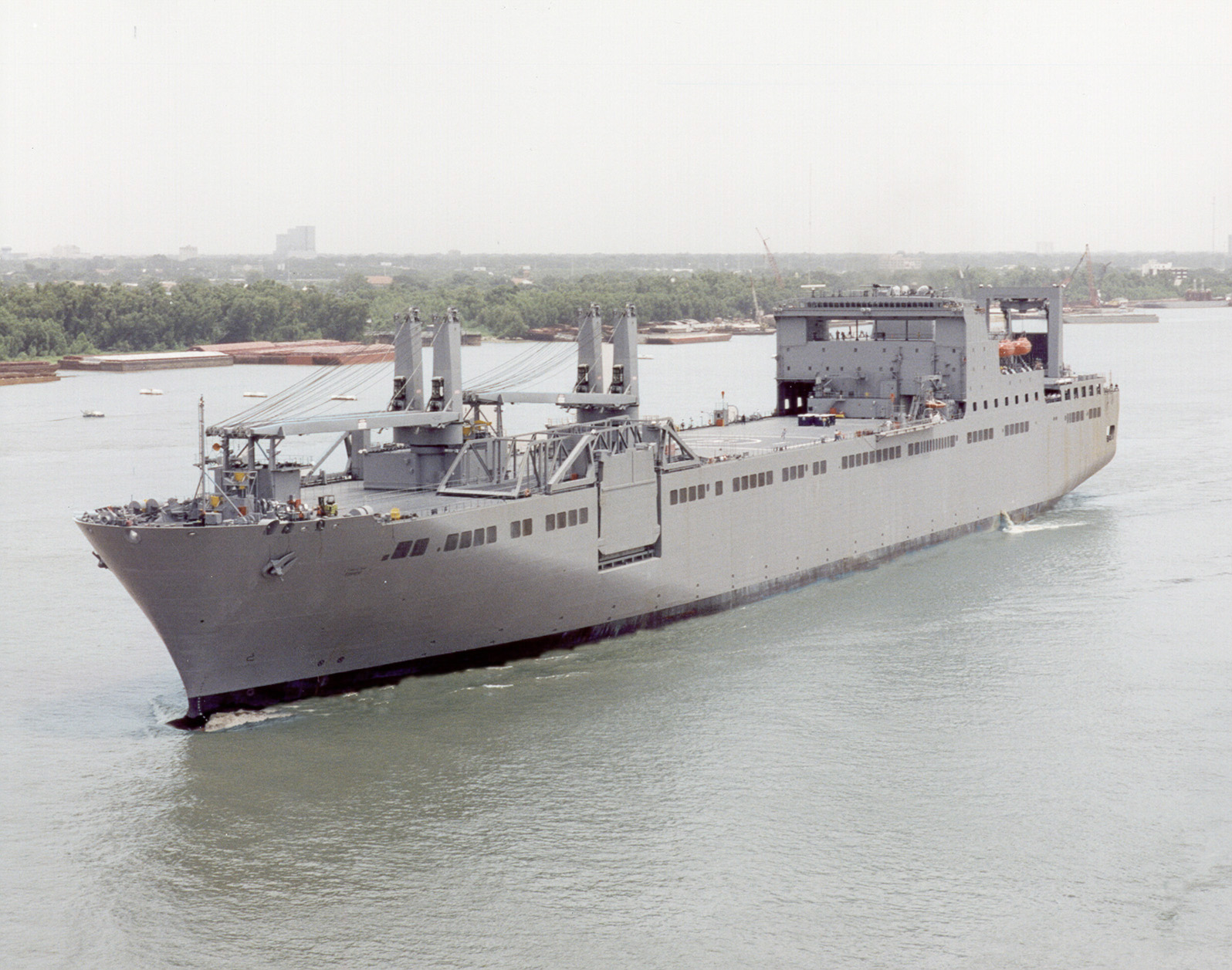

History

United States
- Name: Fisher
- Operator: Military Sealift Command
- Builder: Northrop Grumman Ship Systems, New Orleans
- Laid down: 15 April 1996
- Launched: 21 October 1997
- In service: 4 August 1998
- Stricken: 7 December 2022
- Identification: IMO number: 9116826; MMSI number: 366985000; Callsign: NHMX
- Status: Stricken, in Ready Reserve Force

General characteristics
- Class & type: Bob Hope-class roll on roll off vehicle cargo ship
- Displacement: 35,500 t.(lt); 62096 t.(fl)
- Length: 951 ft 5 in (290.0 m)
- Beam: 106 ft (32.3 m)
- Draft: 34 ft 10 in (10.6 m) maximum
- Propulsion: 4 × Colt Pielstick 10 PC4.2 V diesels; 65,160 hp(m) (47.89 MW)
- Speed: 24 knots (44 km/h)
- Capacity: 300,000 sq ft (28,000 m^{2}); 49,991 sq ft (4,644.3 m^{2}) deck cargo
- Complement: 30

MV Fisher (T-AKR-301) is a Bob Hope-class roll on roll off vehicle cargo ship of the United States Navy. She was built by Northrop Grumman Ship Systems, New Orleans and delivered to the Navy on 4 August 1998. They assigned her to the United States Department of Defense's Military Sealift Command. Fisher is named for Zachary and Elizabeth Fisher, and is one of 11 Surge LMSRs operated by a private company under contract to the Military Sealift Command. When not operational Fisher was formerly berthed at Baltimore. She is assigned to the MSC Atlantic surge force and is maintained at a 96-hour readiness status, however sits in Portland Harbor in Portland, Oregon.

Fisher was stricken from the Naval Vessel Register on 7 December 2022. As of April 30, 2024 she is moored in Portland, Oregon.
