= William W. Seay =

William Wayne Seay
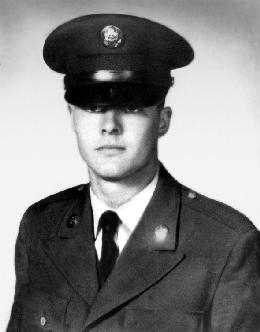
- Born: October 24, 1948; Brewton, Alabama, U.S.
- Died: August 25, 1968 (aged 19) near Ap Nhi, Republic of Vietnam
- Burial place: Weaver Cemetery, Brewton, Alabama
- Military career
- Allegiance: United States
- Branch: United States Army
- Service years: 1967–1968
- Rank: Sergeant
- Units: 62d Transportation Company (Medium Truck), 7th Transportation Battalion, 48th Transportation Group
- Conflicts: Vietnam War †
- Awards: Medal of Honor; Purple Heart

William Wayne Seay (October 24, 1948 – August 25, 1968) was a United States Army soldier and a recipient of the United States military's highest decoration—the Medal of Honor—for his actions in the Vietnam War.

== Biography ==
Seay joined the Army from Montgomery, Alabama in 1967, and by August 25, 1968, was serving as a Sergeant in the 62d Transportation Company (Medium Truck), 7th Transportation Battalion, 48th Transportation Group. On that day, a convoy of the 81 trucks escorted by eight Military Police gun jeeps left Long Binh Post for the 1st Brigade, 25th Infantry Division at Tây Ninh Combat Base. Traveling at the mandated convoy speed of 20 mph, the convoy passed through the village of Ap Nhi. Approximately 11:45, a battalion sized enemy force opened fire from the Ben Chu Rubber Plantation on their right. The lead 30 5-ton cargo trucks escaped the kill zone, but the enemy set two fuel tankers on fire at the front of the convoy and two ammunition trailers on fire at the rear trapping the convoy in between. The enemy fire forced the crews of the trucks and gun jeeps to quickly dismount and take cover leaving their M60 machine guns on their jeeps. The enemy then made a concerted effort to destroy the radios and M-60s on the gun jeeps, but one MP managed to get to his jeep and put in a call for help about 15 minutes into the fight. Meanwhile, SGT Seay and SP4 David Sellman took cover behind the trailers of their rigs and fought back. Seay left the cover of his position several times to toss hand grenades back and was finally wounded in the wrist. The nearest mechanized infantry security forces approached with M113 armored personnel carriers but the intense enemy fire would not allow them to enter the kill zone, so they established casualty collection points at both ends of the kill zone. Truck drivers and MPs either fought in small pockets like Seay and Sellman or maneuvered to the safety of the ends of the convoy. Seay found LT Howard Brockbank and four other soldiers where they treated his wound. He continued to fight back enemy assaults until he died from loss of blood. The ambush lasted for over nine hours and for his actions during the battle, Seay was awarded the Medal of Honor.

Seay, aged 19 at his death, was buried in Weaver Cemetery, Brewton, Alabama.

== Medal of Honor citation ==
Sergeant Seay's official Medal of Honor citation reads:

For conspicuous gallantry and intrepidity in action at the risk of his life above and beyond the call of duty. Sgt. Seay distinguished himself while serving as a driver with the 62d Transportation Company, on a resupply mission. The convoy with which he was traveling, carrying critically needed ammunition and supplies from Long Binh to Tay Ninh, was ambushed by a reinforced battalion of the North Vietnamese Army. As the main elements of the convoy entered the ambush killing zone, they were struck by intense rocket, machinegun and automatic weapon fire from the well concealed and entrenched enemy force. When his convoy was forced to stop, Sgt. Seay immediately dismounted and took a defensive position behind the wheels of a vehicle loaded with high-explosive ammunition. As the violent North Vietnamese assault approached to within 10 meters of the road, Sgt. Seay opened fire, killing 2 of the enemy. He then spotted a sniper in a tree approximately 75 meters to his front and killed him. When an enemy grenade was thrown under an ammunition trailer near his position, without regard for his own safety he left his protective cover, exposing himself to intense enemy fire, picked up the grenade, and threw it back to the North Vietnamese position, killing 4 more of the enemy and saving the lives of the men around him. Another enemy grenade landed approximately 3 meters from Sgt. Seay's position. Again Sgt. Seay left his covered position and threw the armed grenade back upon the assaulting enemy. After returning to his position he was painfully wounded in the right wrist; however, Sgt. Seay continued to give encouragement and direction to his fellow soldiers. After moving to the relative cover of a shallow ditch, he detected 3 enemy soldiers who had penetrated the position and were preparing to fire on his comrades. Although weak from loss of blood and with his right hand immobilized, Sgt. Seay stood up and fired his rifle with his left hand, killing all 3 and saving the lives of the other men in his location. As a result of his heroic action, Sgt. Seay was mortally wounded by a sniper's bullet. Sgt. Seay, by his gallantry in action at the cost of his life, has reflected great credit upon himself, his unit, and the U.S. Army.:

== Legacy ==
The Seay Army Reserve Center on Commanders Drive in Mobile, Alabama was dedicated and named in honor of William Seay for his heroic service. Lt.Col (dec) Arthur Jones Jr. was responsible for this name assignment and dedication. The Seay Auditorium at U.S. Transportation Command, Scott AFB, Illinois, is also named in his honor.

In 1998, the Military Sealift Command vehicle cargo ship USNS Seay was commissioned in his honor.

== See also ==
- List of Medal of Honor recipients
- List of Medal of Honor recipients for the Vietnam War
- Circle the Wagons, The History of US Army Convoy Security, Richard E. Killblane, Combat Studies Institute, 2006
- Convoy Ambush Case Studies Vol. I, Korea and Vietnam, Richard E. Killblane, US Army Transportation School, 2014
