= Duc Lap Camp =

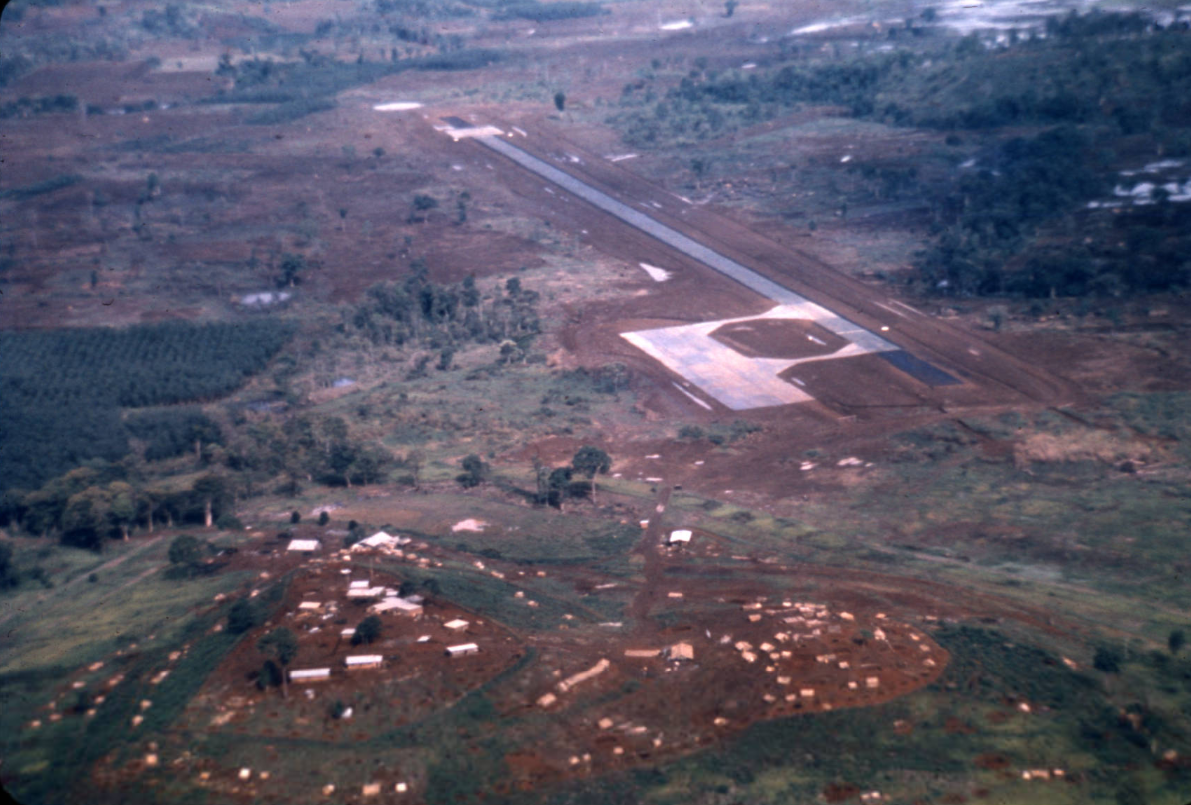
- Duc Lap Camp, 24 April 1967

Site information
- Type: Army Base

Location
- Coordinates: 12.428°N 107.675°E

Site history
- Built: 1966
- In use: 1966–72
- Battles/wars: Vietnam War; Battle of Duc Lap

Garrison information
- Occupants: 5th Special Forces Group

Duc Lap Airfield
- IATA: none; ICAO: none

Summary
- Elevation AMSL: 2,264 ft (690 m)

Runways
Direction	Length		Surface
Direction	ft	m	Surface
	3,300	1,006	crushed rock

Duc Lap Camp (also known as Duc Lap Special Forces Camp or Hill 722) is a former U.S. Army and Army of the Republic of Vietnam (ARVN) base southwest of Buôn Ma Thuột in the Central Highlands of Vietnam.

== History ==
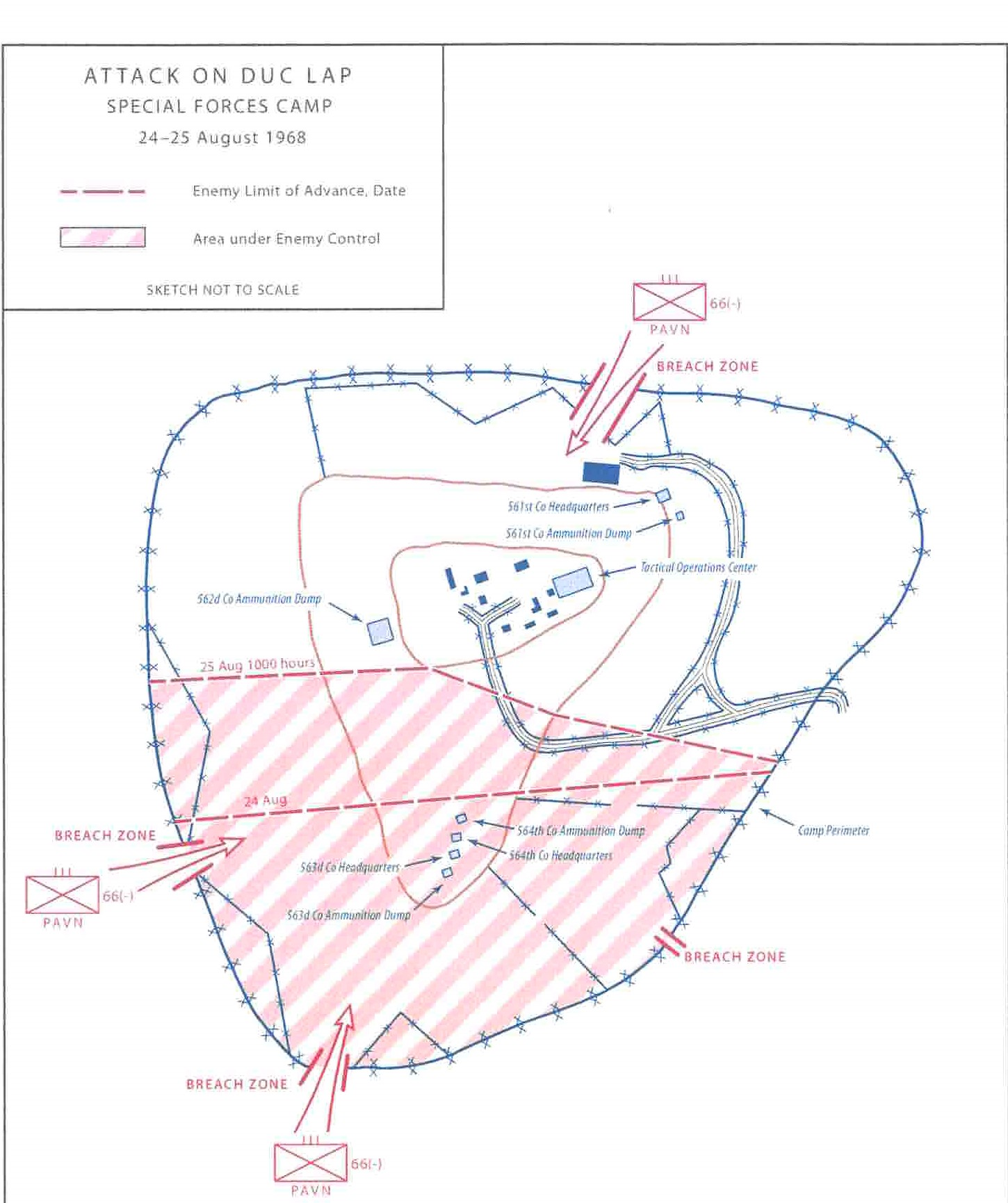
Attack on Duc Lap Special Forces Camp, 24–25 August 1968

The 5th Special Forces Group Detachment A-239 first established a base here in October 1966. The base was located 67 km southwest of Buôn Ma Thuột and approximately 14 km from the Cambodian border.

In August 1968, the base was manned by Special Forces, three members of the 403rd Radio Research Special Operations Detachment, 11 ARVN special forces and over 600 CIDG troops.

From 23 to 25 August 1968 the People's Army of Vietnam (PAVN) 95C Regiment attempted to overrun the base. The assault was defeated at a cost of six U.S., one ARVN, 37 CIDG, 20 civilians and over 303 PAVN killed.

The 20th Special Operations Squadron used Duc Lap as a forward base for operations into Cambodia.

In October 1969 the PAVN again besieged Duc Lap and Bu Prang Camp, with the siege only being broken by the ARVN in December.

In December 1970 the base was transferred to the Vietnamese Rangers.

== Current use ==
The base has reverted to jungle.
