= 7th Transportation Battalion (United States) =

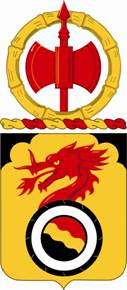
- Coat of Arms
- Country: United States
- Branch: United States Army
- Type: Transportation
- Size: Battalion

Insignia
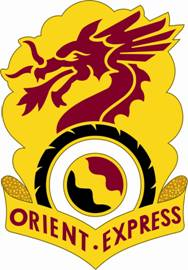
- Distinctive Unit Insignia

The 7th Transportation Battalion is a transportation battalion in the United States Army first constituted in 1943. The 7th Transportation Battalion participated in World War II, Vietnam and Desert Storm/Desert Shield.

== Lineage ==
Constituted 17 June 1943 in the Army of the United States as Headquarters and Headquarters Detachment, 7th Quartermaster Troop Transport Battalion

Activated 25 August 1943 at Camp Livingston, Louisiana

Redesignated 30 November 1943 as Headquarters and Headquarters Detachment, 7th Quartermaster Battalion, Mobile

Inactivated 14 November 1945 at Fort Leonard Wood, Missouri

Converted and redesignated 1 August 1946 as Headquarters and Headquarters Company, 7th Transportation Corps Truck Battalion

Redesignated 16 October 1952 as Headquarters and Headquarters Company, 7th Transportation Battalion, and allotted to the Regular Army

Activated 17 November 1952 at Camp Atterbury, Indiana

Redesignated 25 June 1959 as Headquarters and Headquarters Detachment, 7th Transportation Battalion

Inactivated 30 March 1972 at Fort Lewis, Washington

Activated 21 July 1974 at Fort Bragg, North Carolina

Inactivated 19 August 2011 at Fort Bragg, North Carolina

== Campaign participation credit ==
World War II: Rhineland; Central Europe

Vietnam: Counteroffensive, Phase II; Counteroffensive, Phase III; Tet Counteroffensive; Counteroffensive, Phase IV; Counteroffensive, Phase V; Counteroffensive, Phase VI; Tet 69/Counteroffensive; Summer-Fall 1969; Winter-Spring 1970; Sanctuary Counteroffensive; Counteroffensive, Phase VII; Consolidation I; Consolidation II

Southwest Asia: Defense of Saudi Arabia; Liberation and Defense of Kuwait; Cease-Fire

== Decorations ==
- Meritorious Unit Commendation (Army) for VIETNAM 1968–1969
- Meritorious Unit Commendation (Army) for VIETNAM 1969
- Meritorious Unit Commendation (Army) for SOUTHWEST ASIA 1990–1991
- Meritorious Unit Commendation (Army) for OPERATION IRAQI FREEDOM 2010-2011
