= MV Bob Hope =

Cargo ship of the United States Navy

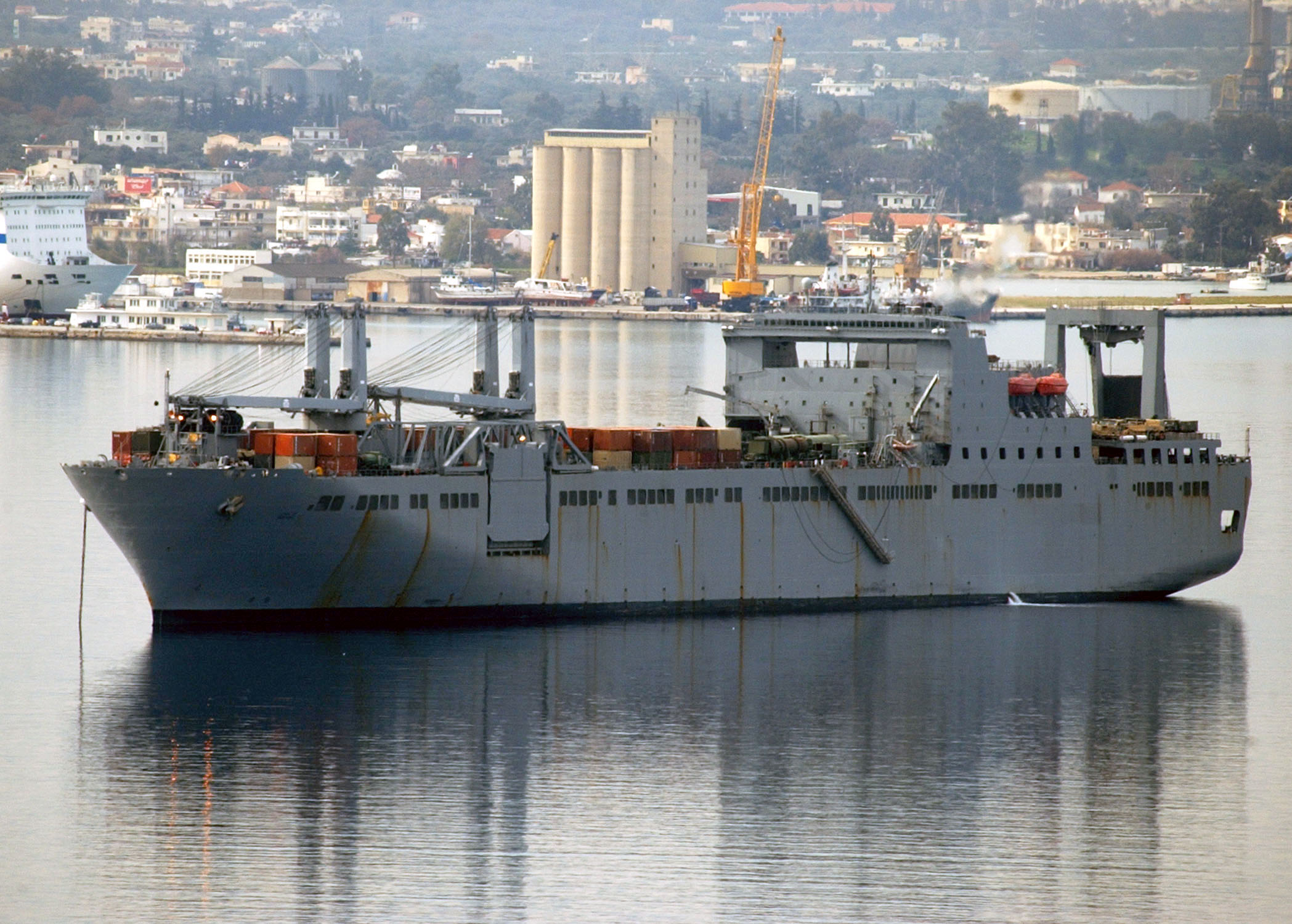
- Bob Hope in harbor at Souda Bay in Crete

History

United States
- Name: USNS Bob Hope
- Namesake: Bob Hope
- Awarded: 2 September 1993
- Builder: Avondale Shipyard
- Laid down: 29 May 1995
- Launched: 27 March 1997
- Completed: 18 November 1998
- In service: 18 November 1998
- Stricken: 19 December 2022
- Home port: Portland, Oregon
- Identification: IMO number: 9085297; MMSI number: 368836000; Callsign: NHNM
- Status: Active in Reduced Operational Status

General characteristics
- Class & type: Bob Hope-class vehicle cargo ship
- Displacement: 62,069 tons full
- Length: 951 ft 5 in (290.0 m)
- Beam: 106 ft (32.3 m)
- Draft: 34 ft 10 in (10.6 m) maximum
- Propulsion: 4 x Colt Pielstick 10 PC4.2 V diesels; 65,160 hp (48,590 kW) Falk Gear Power Transmission
- Speed: 24 knots (44 km/h; 28 mph)
- Capacity: 380,000 sq ft (35,000 m^{2})
- Complement: 26 to 45 civilian crew; up to 50 active duty
- Aviation facilities: Helicopter landing area

USNS Bob Hope (T-AKR-300), the lead ship of its class of vehicle cargo ships for United States Army vehicle prepositioning, is a naval ship of the United States named after Bob Hope, the entertainer. Very few ships of the United States Navy have been named after a person who was alive at the time of the christening.

The contract to build her was awarded to Avondale Industries on 2 September 1993 and her keel was laid down on 29 May 1995. She was launched on 27 March 1997, and delivered on 18 November 1998.

A non-combatant roll-on/roll-off (RORO) vessel crewed by U.S. civilian mariners under the Navy's Military Sealift Command, Bob Hope and other ships of the class are used to preposition tanks, trucks and other wheeled vehicles and supplies needed to support an army heavy brigade.

She has seen service delivering supplies and equipment to the Balkans and Iraq.

Bob Hope was transferred to the US Maritime Administration on 19 December 2022.

Bob Hope's new berth is Terminal #2 Berth 206 Portland, Oregon.

== Features ==
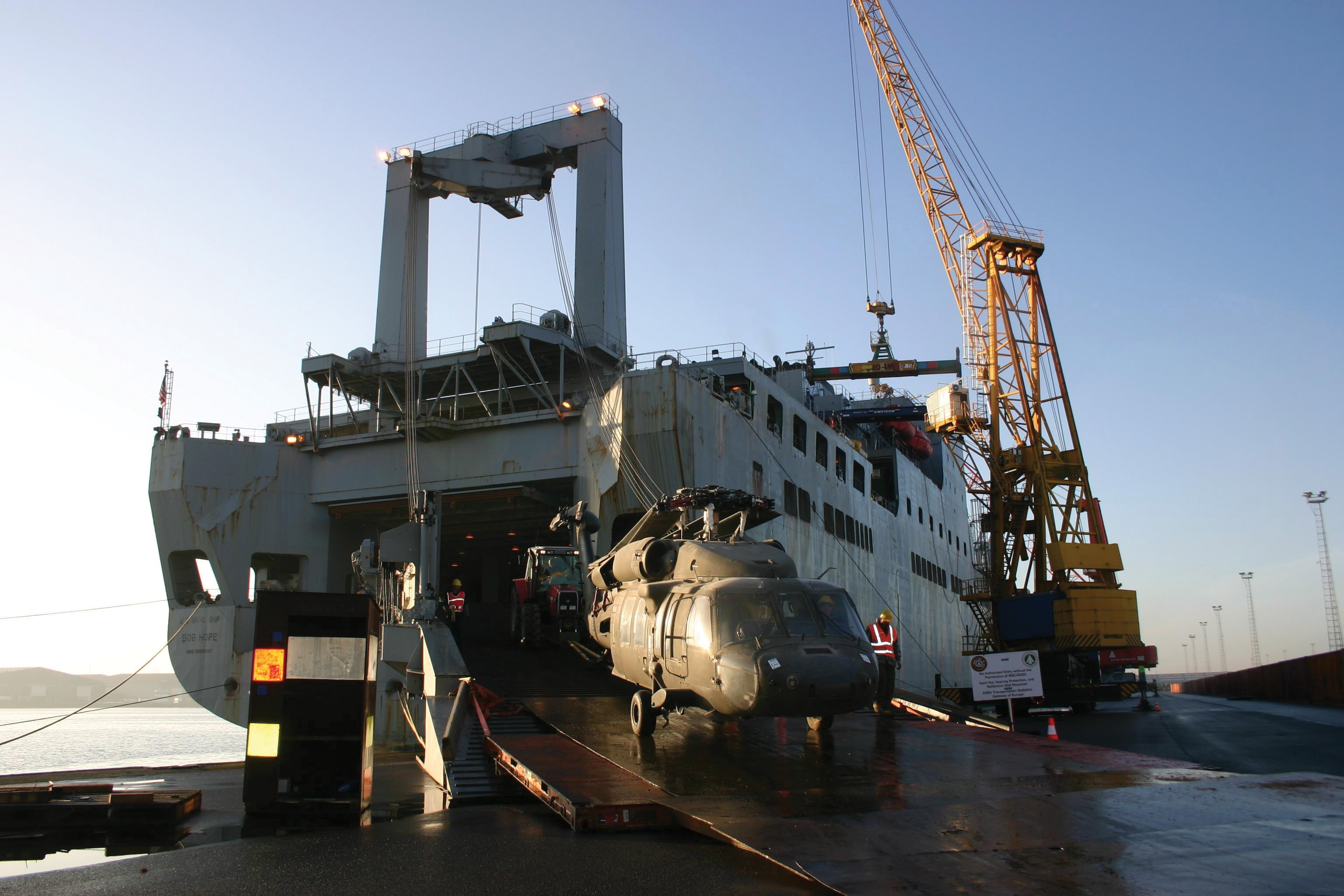
A helicopter being loaded onto Bob Hope in Antwerp, Belgium

The ship has two 110-ton Hagglunds deck crane pedestals mounted with twin cranes.
