= Meşher =

- Meşher

- Location within Istanbul
- Established: 2019
- Location: Istiklal Street, Beyoğlu, Istanbul, Turkey
- Coordinates: 41.030479°N 28.975731°E
- Type: Exhibition space
- Architect: Petraki Meymaridis Efendi (speculated)
- Owner: Vehbi Koç Foundation
- Website: www.mesher.org
- Location on Istiklal Street

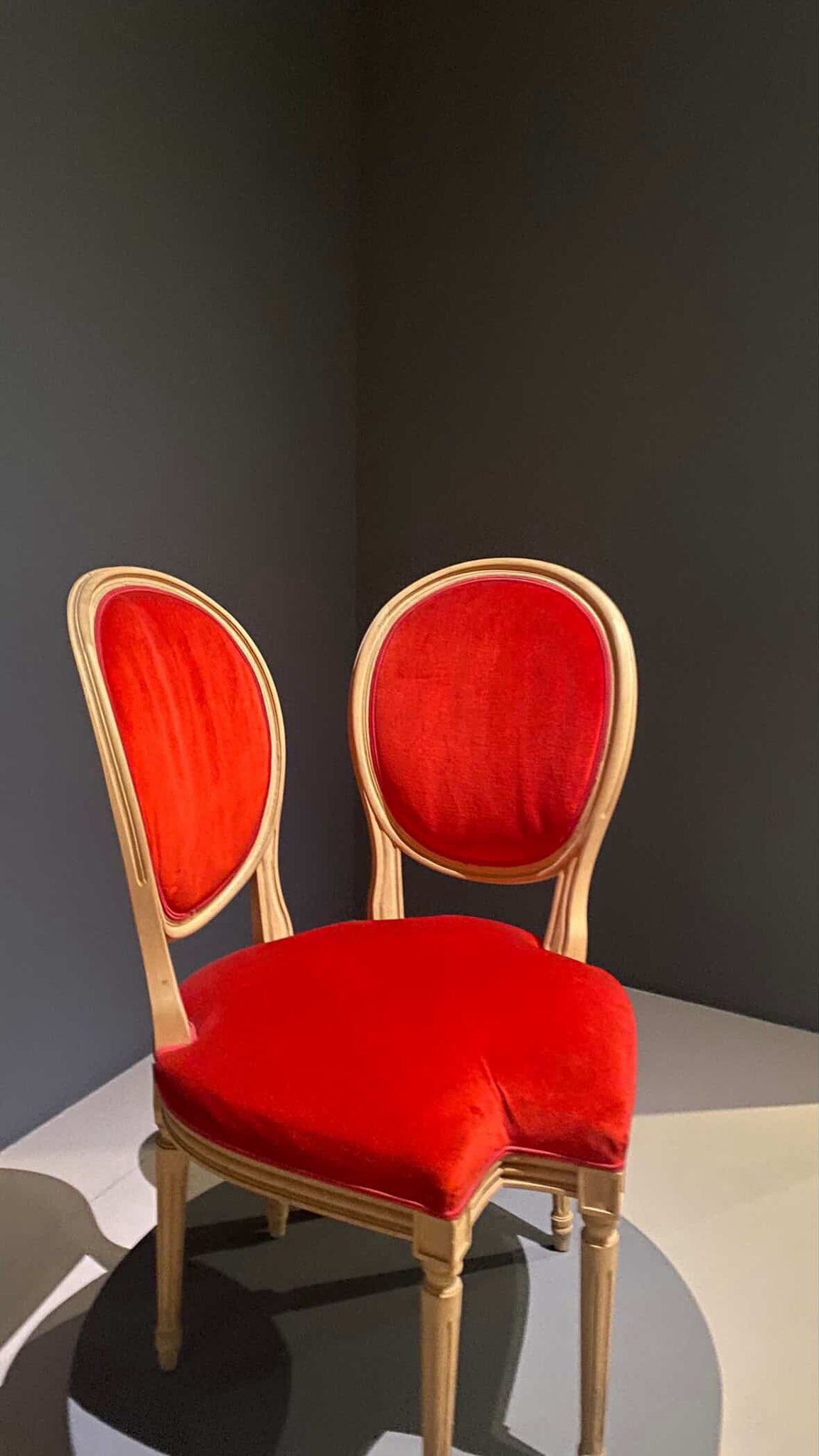
Gözde İlkin: Uyumlanma / Toplanma Meşher Müzesi 2023

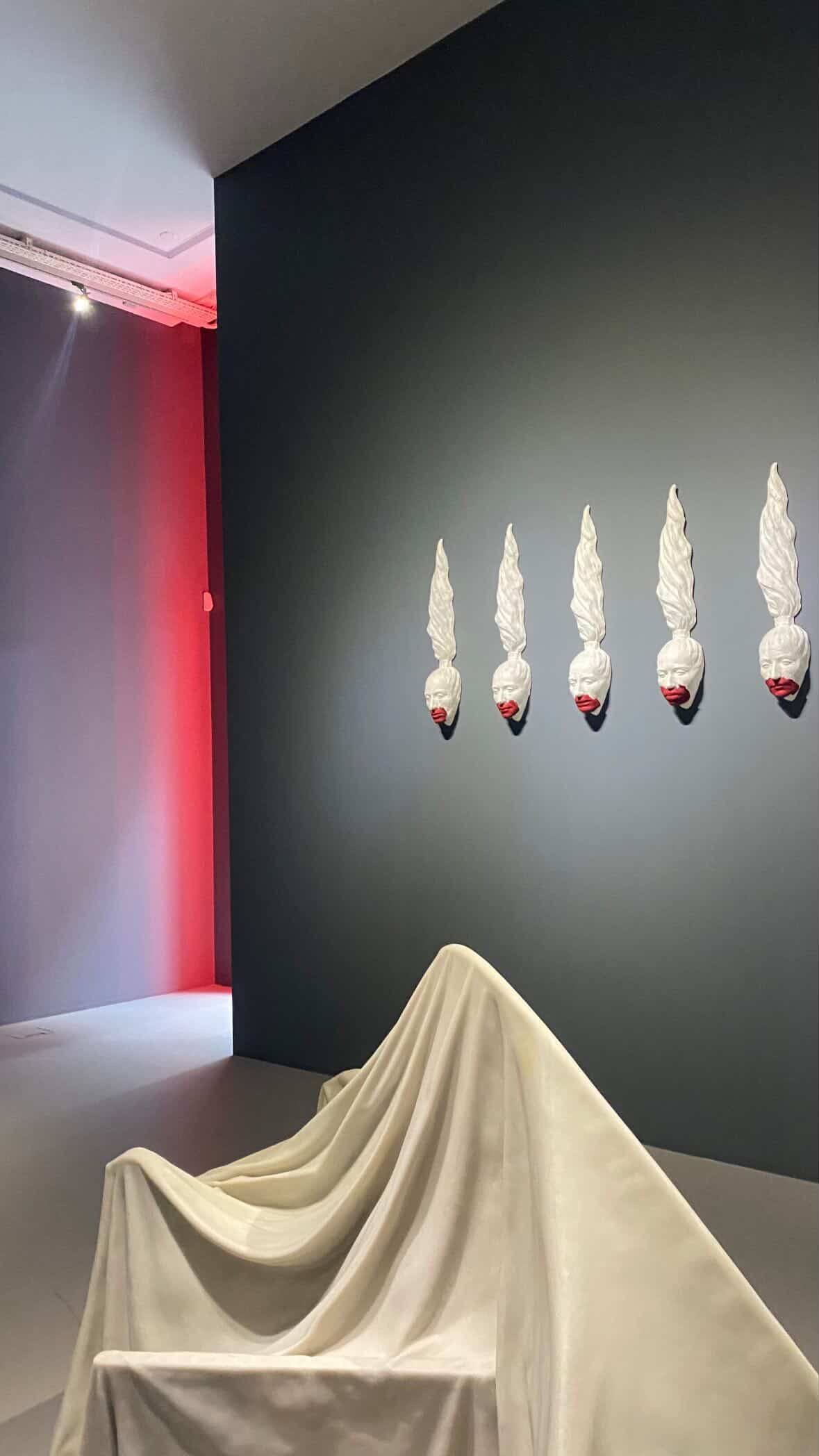
Ben Kimse.Sen de mi Kimsesin? 2022 Meşher Museum

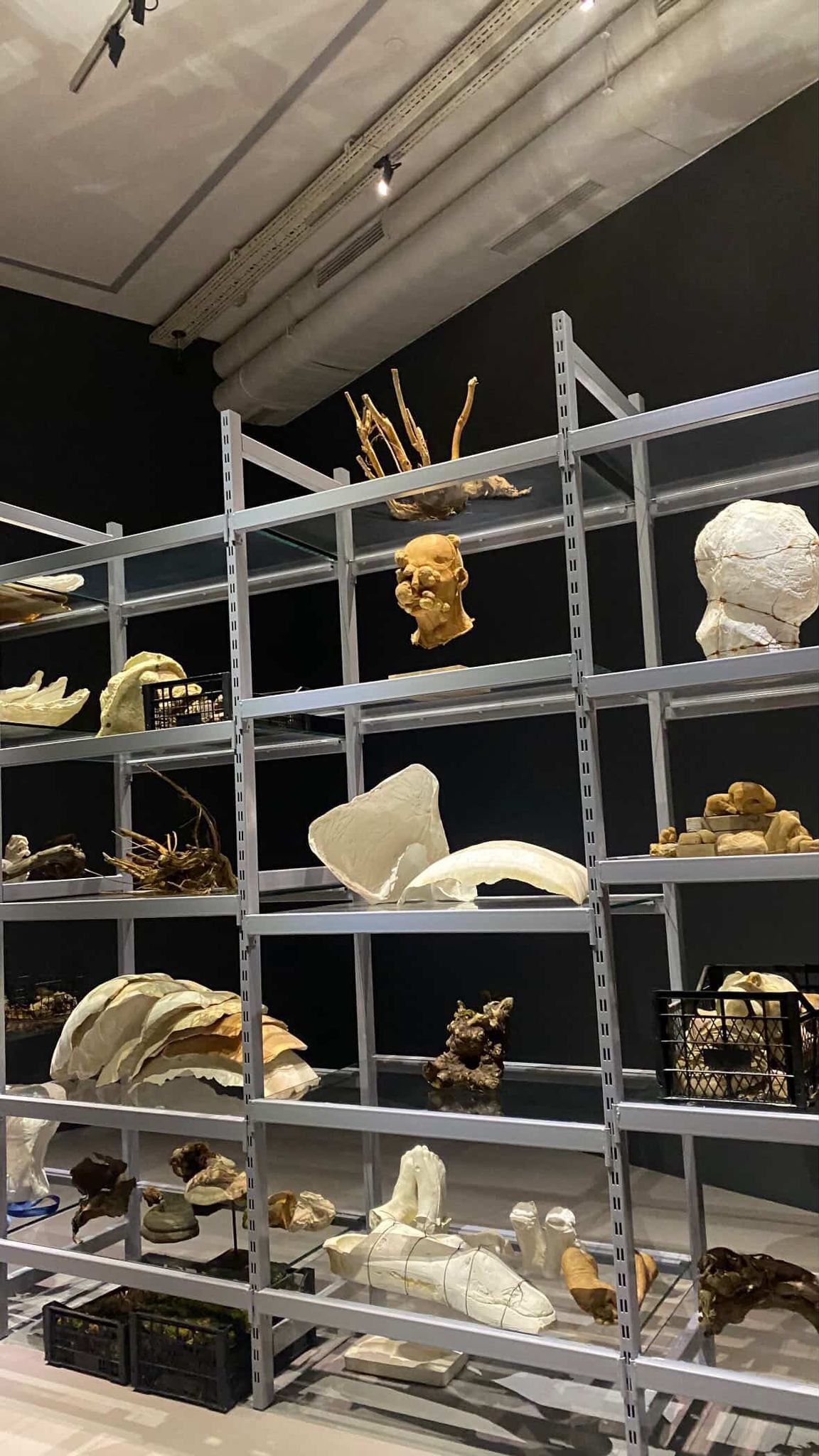
Gözde İlkin: Doğa-Kültür Kataloğu Meşher Müzesi 2023

Meşher is an art exhibition space on Istiklal Street in Istanbul, Turkey, operated by the private Vehbi Koç Foundation. Meşher was founded in 2019 in the building that formerly housed the Arter. The name Meşher is the Ottoman Turkish word (مشهر / مَشْهَرْ ) meaning exhibition or exhibition space.

== I-You-They: A Century of Artist Women (2021–2022) ==
The exhibition named I-You-They: A Century of Artist Women initially was held from 9 October 2021 to 27 March 2022 but was later extended another two months until 29 May 2022. It included pieces created by female artists who were based in Turkey and active between the years of the 1850s and the 1950s. It intends to recognize artists that are largely unrecognized in classic art history.

The exhibition was curated by Deniz Artun, and was created under patronage by Çiğdem Simavi. The exhibition displayed more than 200 artworks by women artists, some of whose names have been forgotten and others who are well-known. (Note: These artists include: Naile Akıncı, Nükhet Aksoy, Maide Arel, Hale Asaf, Perran Berrünnisa Atamdemir, Jülide Atılmaz, Can Ayan, Neşe Aybey, Şükran Aziz, Hatice Şahiye Barlas, Iraida Barry, Behice Nuri, Saime Belir, Belkıs Mustafa, Lerzan Bengisu, Sabiha Bengütaş, Nimet Berdan, Aliye Berger, Semiha Berksoy, Mevhibe Meziyet Beyat, Deniz Bilgin, Zerrin Bölükbaşı, Zabelle C. Boyajian, Sabiha Bozcalı, Halet Çambel, Refia Edren Çiray, Nevin Çokay, Hamiye Çolakoğlu, Gül Derman, Didar Tahsin, Şükriye Dikmen, Tiraje Dikmen, Güzin Duran, Ayhan Dürrüoğlu, Afife Ecevit, Nazlı (Emin) Ecevit, Efruz Cemil, Melahat Ekinci, Esma Ekiz, Emine Semiyye Hilmi, Selma Emiroğlu, Özden Akbaşoğlu Ergökçen, Nebahat Erkekli, Mari Ertoran (Kaloyan), Semiha Es, Esma İbret Hanım, Eren Eyüboğlu, Fatma Saime Cenap, Seniye Fenmen, Sühendan Fırat, Bilge Friedlaender, Lina Gabuzzi, Filiz Özgüven Galatalı, Ruzin Gerçin, Mari Gerekmezyan, Vildan Gizer, Nevide Gökaydın, Beyza Gönensay, Bedia Güleryüz, Hatice Süleyman, Hayriye Nuri, Seta Hidiş, Sara Farhi Huntzinger, Selime Işıtan, Mürşide İçmeli, Nasip İyem, Naciye İzbul, Sare İsmet Kabaağaçlı, İvon Karsan, Gencay Kasapçı, Nevzat Kasman, Sevim Kent, Türkan Kıran, Sabahat Kırlı, Füreya Koral, Hakkiye Koral, Emel Korutürk, Melike Abasıyanık Kurtiç, Müreccel Küçükaksoy, Harika Lifij, Mihri Rasim (Müşfik), Yıldız Moran, Muhterem Ömer, Muide Esad, Müfide Kadri, Nedime Ahmet, Nevin Edhem, Nimet Raif, Nüveyre Faik, Maryam Özacul (Özcilyan), Necla Özbay Özdemir, Rahime Yusuf Ziyaeddin, Rana Salih, Ruhiye, Safiye, Kristin Saleri, Mukaddes (Erol) Saran, Bedia Sarıkaya, Leyla Gamsız Sarptürk, Melek Celal Sofu, Harika Söylemezoğlu, İvi Stangali, Virginia Stolzenberg, Emel Şahinkaya, Maryam Şahinyan, Nasra Şimmeshindi, Şükûfe İbrahim, Tâciser Salih Şâkir, Cahide Tamer, Leman Tantuğ, Zekavet Bayer Taş, Frumet Tektaş, Celile Uğuraldım, Melahat Üren, Mary Adelaide Walker, Fahrelnissa Zeid and Elisa Pante Zonaro.) Most of the works had never been part of an exhibition before. According to co-curator of the exhibition Ebru Esra Satıcı "one of the objectives of this exhibition is to point out these...hidden treasures to researchers, art historians or scholars who are specialising on women's studies to conduct more research on these names and come up with new finds". The exhibition was split into three floors with their own themes; I, You and They. The first floor, I, focuses on the artists' theme of self-perception, reflections, or other forms of self-discovery and includes among others self-portrait photographs and other artworks. The second floor, You, is about motherhood among other themes, it is about the close environment of the artist, children or parents and displays artworks within that theme. The third floor, They, shows artworks around the theme of how society sees women including artworks that society expects women to paint featuring more domestic topics including flowers, children, food and plants.

== List of exhibitions ==
- 2019 – Beyond the Vessel, Myths, Legends, and Fables in Contemporary Ceramics around Europe, (September 13 – December 22)
- 2020 – Alexis Gritchenko – The Constantinople Years, (7 February – 1 November)
- 2021/2022 – I-You-They: A Century of Artist Women, (October 9, 2021 – May 29, 2022)

== Notes ==
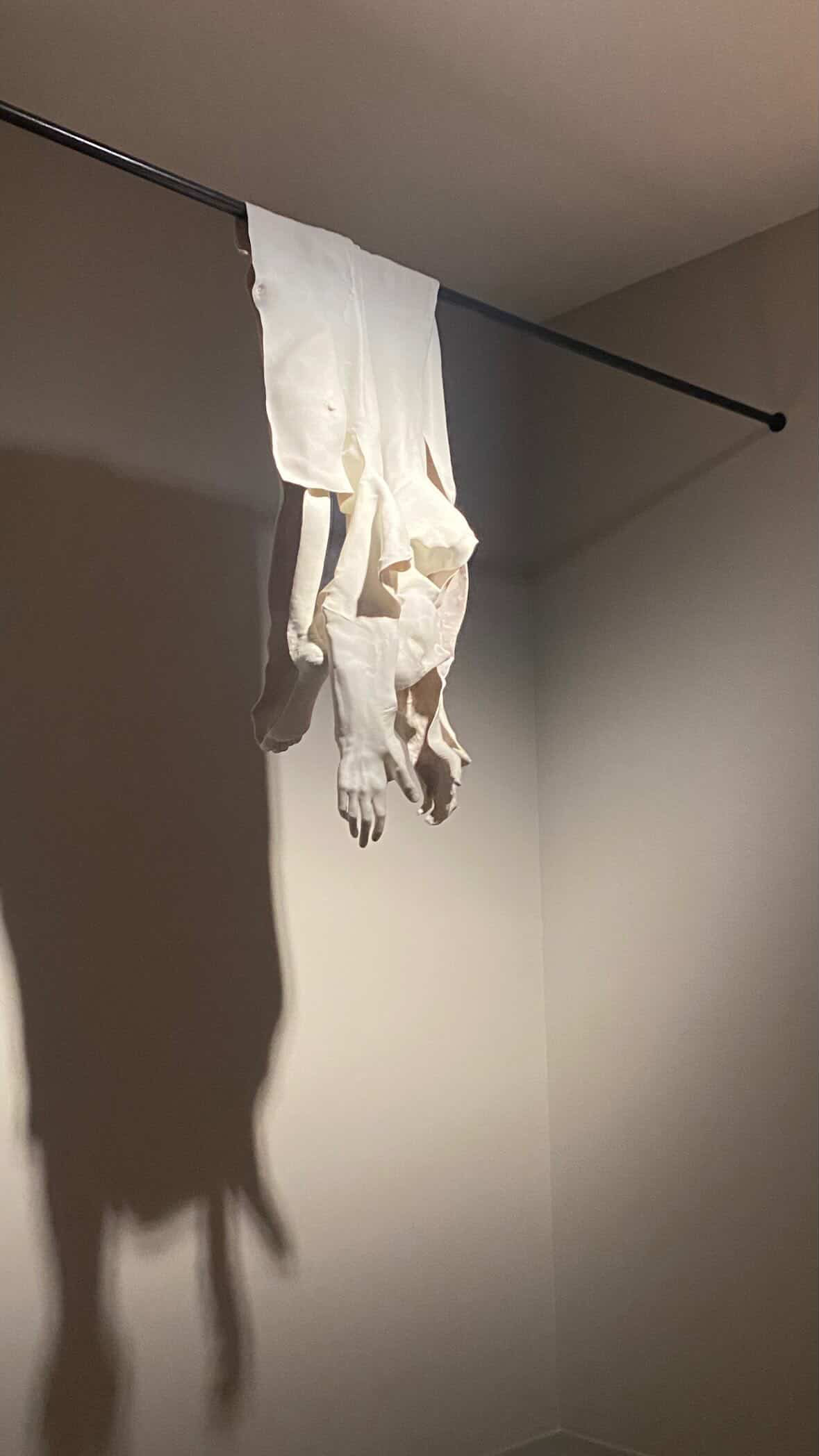
Mehtap Baydu ''Ben ve Her Şey Arasındaki Mesafe'' 2022 Meşher Museum
