= Fine Arts Union =

Artist collective based in Istanbul

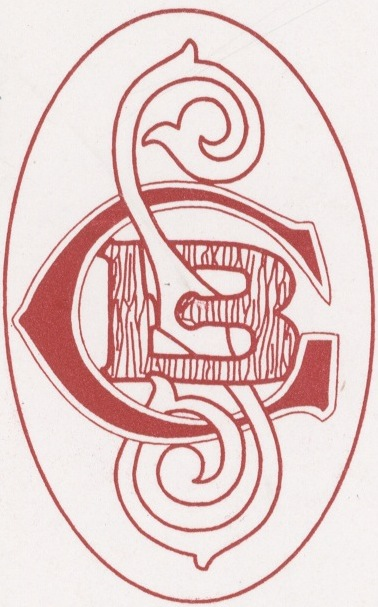
Fine Arts Union Logo as of at least 1999

The Fine Arts Union (Turkish: Güzel Sanatlar Birliği) is an organisation founded by İstanbul artists in 1909. In addition to the Architecture branch other branches were also available.

Hassa Architects Association, which means Architects Affiliated with the Palace during the Ottoman Empire, can be considered the first architectural organization of these lands. A union of architects in the modern sense is the Ottoman Engineers and Architects Association, which was founded in 1908 under the leadership of Architect Kemalettin Bey.

In the establishment of both the Ottoman Society of Engineers and Architects and the Fine Arts Union, the freedoms brought by the Second Constitutional Era, which was declared in 1908 was effective. The Second Constitutional Era and the accepted constitution therein brought freedom of association, which gave rise to the possibility of establishing both associations.

This organization, which was first established by the graduates of Sanayi-i Nefise Mektebi in 1909 under the name of Ottoman Painters Society, was reorganized as the Fine Arts Union as of March 9, 1927. Under this organization, there were painting, sculpture and ornamentation departments as well as the field of architecture. The architecture department of the Fine Arts Union later became the Istanbul branch of the Turkish Architects Association in 1934.

== Painting branch ==
One of the branches of the Fine Arts Union is the Painting Branch (Turkish: GÜZEL SANATLAR BİRLİĞİ RESİM DERNEĞİ). It changed names to Türk Ressamları Cemiyeti (Turkish Painters Society) in 1921, and to Güzel Sanatlar Birliği Resim Derneği in 1973. It was re-formed in 1985. As of 1985, its members were Naile Akinci, Nazan Akpinar, Maide Arel, Rahmi Artemİz, Neşe Aybey, Cafer Bater, Hüseyin Bılışık, Sabiha Bozcali, Adil Doğançay, Nazlı Ecevit, Ruzin Gerçın, Habib Gerez, Bedia Güler Yüz, Güler Haşımoğlu, Nüshet İslımyelı, Necdet Kalay, Gülseren Kayali, Zeki Kiral, Türkân Kiran, Gıyas Korkut, Ayşe Yazıcı Özel, Sibel Özkaygisiz, Kainat Barkan Pajonk, Numan Pura, Nermin Pura, Haluk Tezonar, Nesibe Türkömer, Naim Uludoğan, Nevin Göker Ulutaş, and Celal Üzmen. As of at least 2005, its members also include Nihal Güres and others.

== See also ==
- Hassa Mimarlar Ocağı
- Osmanlı Mühendis ve Mimar Cemiyeti
- Mimarlar Derneği
- Mimarlar Odası
