= Sevdiye Nilgün Acar =

Turkish artist

Sevdiye Nilgün Durmaz Acar
- Born: Sevdiye Nilgün Acar; 1958
- Education: Neşe Aybey, Nilgün Gencer
- Known for: Miniature

Sevdiye Nilgün Acar (born 1958) is a Turkish miniature artist.

She was born in 1958 and graduated from Şişli High School. She was educated in the art of miniature by her teachers Neşe Aybey and Nilgün Gencer.

Later she became a teacher at the Miniature Club at Kültür High School and taught there for some time.

She works on large format miniature paintings and has said that she particularly uses gouache, watercolor and gold leaf.

== Known exhibitions ==
- Boğazın En Güzel Kadını, Sinan Bey 2 (boat) in Aşiyan, (6 March - 14 March) 2016
- Sonradan, Türkiye Gazeteciler Cemiyeti Basın Müzesi Resim Sergisi, (11 April - 26 April) 2016
