= Contemporary Turkish miniature =

Current stage of Turkish miniature since 20th century

Contemporary Turkish miniature is the stage of the Turkish miniature art in Turkey from the mid-20th century to the present day. Contemporary Turkish miniature art is exactly the same art form as 16th-century Ottoman miniature; however, it is no longer just a book art and had developed into a fully standalone form of art with miniature artists depicting anything in any size they want while still using the same techniques as 16th-century miniature artists.

"The miniature painter of today observes, thinks and depicts in exactly the same way as his 16th century counterpart, but the manner of presentation, the lines and the colours vary in accordance with the individualstyle of the miniature painter himself, and we can see just as important differences between the various artists working today as between the great miniature painters of the past".

— Neşe Aybey

== Changes from Ottoman miniature ==
Contemporary Turkish miniature is the same art form as Ottoman miniature however the circumstances in which it was created differ. Turkish miniature does not at all mean that the artwork must be small to be miniature, historically miniatures had always been small as it was an Ottoman book art and therefore had to fit on the page of a book. Miniature paintings of the modern era however are often created as standalone paintings and can be large. Contemporary miniature artists create miniatures of whatever they like or are inspired by, this is different from the old miniature because the function of those were to illustrate written text on the page in the book that it was in. In the old days when miniature was still only a book art, the miniature artists would work in collaboration with each other with multiple artist working on one piece. Contemporary miniature art sees an artist create their own work entirely by themselves. They even make their own paper and prepare their own colors and gold leaf, this adds another degree of freedom.

== History ==
The art form of Turkish miniature was neglected as Turkish art was looking towards the west and the only miniature art produced were copies of old Turkish masterpieces. However this changed in the 1950s when there was movement in the revival of the classical Turkish arts of old with an emerging interest. Miniature artists started to make original pieces again, the same style as the old master pieces but entirely new works of art.

== What is classified as miniature? ==
What is considered to be a miniature today still follows the same criteria as the miniaturists of the 16th century. These are that the painting is not bound by criteria such as three dimensionality, perspective, shadows and light.

== Miniature education in Turkey ==
Miniature has been taught at the Department of Traditional Turkish Arts at the Istanbul Academy of Fine Arts (now Mimar Sinan Fine Arts University). This institution has been an important centre of knowledge for miniature in Turkey. Miniaturists Professor Tahirzade Hüseyin Behzad (1880–1961) taught at the academy from 1947 on. He taught a next generation of Turkish miniaturists such as Neşe Aybey (1930–2015), who later taught at the academy herself.

== See also ==
- Islamic miniature
- Ottoman miniature

== Sources ==
- Aybey, Neşe (May 1979). "XX Yuzyilda Türk Minyatur Sanatı" [The Art of the Turkish Miniature in the 20th Century] (PDF). Sanat Dünyamız (in Turkish). Vol. 6, no. 16. Yapi Kredi Publications. pp. 37–42. hdl:11498/40180. Archived from the original (PDF) on 2019-05-27.
- "Geleneksel Türk Sanatlar Bölümü" (in Turkish). MSGSÜ. p. Tarihçe.
- Artun, Deniz; Çetin, Şeyda; Satıcı, Ebru Esra (2021). I-You-They: A Century of Artist Women. Translated by Şengözer, Aykut (1 ed.). Vehbi Koç Foundation. ISBN 978-605-9606-26-4.
