= Yusuf Taktak =

Turkish artist

Yusuf Taktak (born 1951) is a Turkish artist and academic. He was a student of and later taught in Adnan Cokers atelier.

He has worked on wall paintings, participated in biennials in Turkey and internationally as well as group exhibitions. His art is known for working with geometric forms in the paint texture. Taktak considers colors as a prominent element in his artwork. He does not depict people in his works but makes the feeling of humanity and life felt through the art. He is a known name in avant-garde of the 1980s.

== Early life and education ==
He was born in 1951 in Bolvadin. In 1974 he graduated from the Istanbul Academy of Fine Arts, from the studio Joker Atelier of Professor Adnan Coker. He also studied at Salzburg Summer Academy (Note: Salzburg Summer Academy of Fine Arts) with Mario Deluigi.

== Career ==
In 1976 he initiated his career at the Istanbul Museum of Fine Arts and Sculpture. He also taught at the Istanbul Academy of Fine Arts, teaching at the Adnan Coker Atelier. He left these positions in the early 90s. From 1997 to 1998 he was a teacher at the Yeditepe University.

In 1989 he organised the exhibition about Osman Hamdi Bey at the Mimar Sinan University Painting and Sculpture Museum. The exhibition included the sculptures by Zühtü Müridoğlu, Gustav Deluye and Oskan Efendi of Osman Hamdi bey. In 2005 he initiated a position at the Yıldız Technical University and the faculty of art and design which he stayed at until 2017, he worked here along with working in his atelier. He works and lives in Istanbul.

Taktak has been credited with "playing an active role in the shaping of art" in Turkey and giving significant efforts in "framing the memory of Turkish art." During his time teaching he was the teacher of many Turkish artists such as Esti Saul.

He was among the artists to burn their works for a museum in commemoration of the Sivas Massacre. He is among the founders of the ASSOCİATİON INTERNATİONALE DES ARTS PLASTİQUES (Turkish: Uluslararası Plastik Sanatlar Derneği) His work is in the collection of the İstanbul Modern.

Taktak, along with Ahmet Öktem, Altan Gürman, Cengiz Çekil, Gülsün Karamustafa, Hüseyin Bahri Alptekin, Moni Salim Özgilik, Mustafa Altıntaş, Kutluğ Ataman, Nur Koçak, Sabiha Rüştü Bozcalı, Serhat Kiraz and Tomur Atagök has contributed to the artist archives of Salt Research.

== Recent personal exhibitions ==
- 2012 - Zamanlar İçinde
- 2014 - Zamansız
- 2015 - ZAM-ANLAMA
- 2016 - Kaybolan Uygarlıklar
- 2019 - Ellerim Tanıktır Zamana
- 2022 - yaZaman
