= Ayşe Kulin =

Turkish novelist and columnist (born 1941)

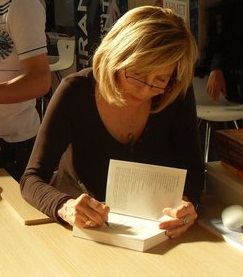
- Born: August 26, 1941 (age 85); Istanbul, Turkey
- Education: American College for Girls
- Writing career
- Language: Turkish
- Genres: Short story writer, screenwriter, novelist
- Website: aisenglish.weebly.com

Ayşe Kulin (born 26 August 1941) is a Turkish short story writer, screenwriter and novelist.

== Biography ==
Kulin was born in Istanbul in 1941. Her father, Muhittin Kulin, of Bosniak origin, was one of the first civil engineers in Istanbul who founded the State Hydraulic Works (DSİ); he was soon appointed first director of this institution. Her mother Sitare Hanım, a Circassian, was the granddaughter of one of the Ottoman economy ministers.

Kulin graduated from the American College for Girls in Arnavutköy, Istanbul. She released a collection of short stories titled Güneşe Dön Yüzünü in 1984. A short story from this called Gülizar was made into a film titled Kırık Bebek in 1986, for which she won a screenplay award from the Ministry of Culture and Tourism. Kulin worked as a screenwriter, cinematographer and producer for many films, television series and advertisements. In 1986, she won the "Best Cinematographer Award" from the Theatre Writers Association for her work in the television series Ayaşlı ve Kiracıları. In the 80s, she also took painting lessons from Yusuf Taktak.

In 1996, she wrote a biography of Münir Nurettin Selçuk titled Bir Tatlı Huzur. With a short story called Foto Sabah Resimleri she won the "Haldun Taner Short Story Award" the same year, and the "Sait Faik Short Story Award" the next year. In 1997, she was honored as the "Writer of the Year" by the İstanbul Communication Faculty for her biographical novel Adı Aylin, She won the same award the next year for her short story Geniş Zamanlar. In November 1999, she wrote a novel called Sevdalinka about the Bosnian War and in 2000, a biographical novel called Füreyya. In June 2001, she put out a novel titled Köprü about drama in Turkey's eastern provinces and how they shaped the republic's early history.

In May 2002, Kulin wrote a novel titled Nefes Nefes'e about the Turkish diplomats, who have saved the lives of Jews during the Holocaust in World War II.

She has been married twice. Her latest novels, "Hayat" and "Hüzün," describe her life with her spouses, Mehmet Sarper and Eren Kemahli. Both marriages ended in divorce, but she had four sons from these marriages. She joined Republican People's Party in 2025.

== English language bibliography ==
Several of Kulin's novels and one short story collection have been published in English language translation.

Photo "Sabah" Pictures

Photo "Sabah" Pictures (Turkish title: Foto Sabah Resimleri) is a 1998 collection of three inter-connected short stories, which was awarded the 1998 Haldun Taner Short Story Award, the 1999 Sait Faik Story Prize, and was republished in 2004 by Epsilon Yayınevi in English language translation by Martina Keskintepe.

- Editions
- Photo "Sabah" Pictures. Trans: Martina Keskintepe. Istanbul: Epsilon Yayınevi. 2004. ISBN 978-975-331-535-7.

Last Train to Istanbul

Last Train to Istanbul (Turkish title: Nefes Nefese) is a 2002 novel, which was republished in 2006 by Everest Yayınları in English language translation by John W. Baker.

- Editions
- Last train to Istanbul. Trans: John W. Baker. Istanbul: Everest Yayınları. 2006. ISBN 978-975-289-327-6.

Aylin

Aylin (Turkish title: Adı: Aylin) is a 1997 novel, which was republished in 2007 by Remzi Kitabevi in English language translation by Dara Çolakoğlu.

- Editions
- Aylin. Trans: Dara Çolakoğlu. Istanbul: Remzi Kitabevi. 2007. ISBN 978-975-14-1228-7.

Face to Face

Face to Face (Turkish title: Bir Gün) is a 2005 novel, which was republished in 2008 by Everest Yayınları in English language translation by John W. Baker.

- Editions*
- Face to Face. Trans: John W. Baker. Istanbul: Everest Yayınları. 2008. ISBN 978-975-289-531-7.

Farewell

Farewell (Turkish title: Veda) is a 2008 novel, which was republished in 2009 by Everest Yayınları in English language translation by Kenneth J. Dakan.

- Editions
- Farewell. Trans: Kenneth J. Dakan. Istanbul: Everest Yayınları. 2009. ISBN 978-975-289-619-2.

== Bibliography ==
- Güneşe Dön Yüzünü, 1984
- Bir Tatlı Huzur, 1996
- Adı: Aylin, 1997
- Geniş Zamanlar, 1998
- Foto Sabah Resimleri, 1998
- Sevdalinka, 1999
- Füreya, 2000
- Köprü, 2001
- Nefes Nefese, 2002
- İçimde Kızıl Bir Gül Gibi, 2002
- Babama, 2002
- Kardelenler, 2004
- Gece Sesleri, 2004
- Bir Gün, 2005
- Bir Varmış Bir Yokmuş, 2007
- Veda, 2008
- Sit Nene`nin Masalları, 2008
- Umut, 2008
- Taş Duvar Açık Pencere, 2009
- Türkan, 2009
- Hayat – Dürbünümde Kırk Sene (1941–1964), 2011
- Hüzün – Dürbünümde Kırk Sene (1964–1983), 2011
- Gizli Anların Yolcusu, 2011
- Bora'nın Kitabı, 2012
- Dönüş, 2013
- Hayal, 2014
- Handan, 2014
- Tutsak Güneş, 2016
