= İbrahim Çallı =

Turkish painter (1882–1960)

- Çallı İbrahim
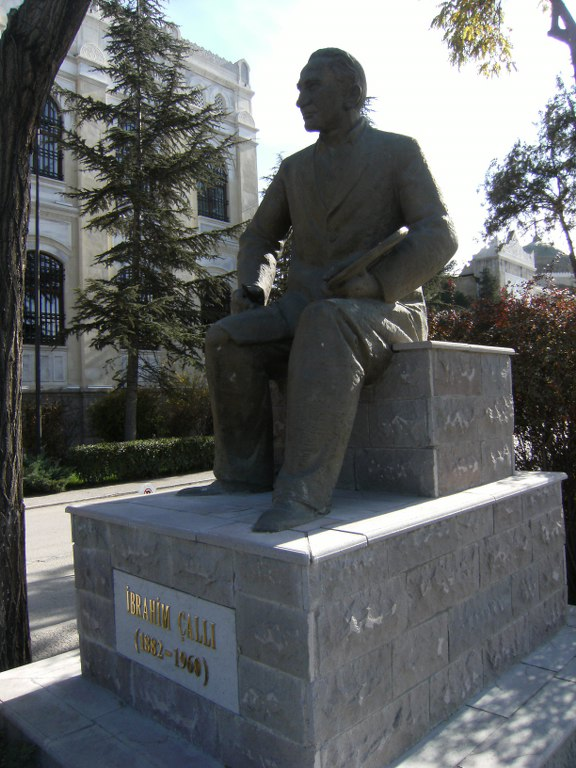
- Statue of İbrahim Çallı in State Art and Sculpture Museum in Ankara
- Born: July 13, 1882; Çal, Denizli, Ottoman Empire
- Died: May 2, 1960 (aged 77); Istanbul, Turkey
- Other name: Ibrahim Calli
- Education: Mimar Sinan Fine Arts University
- Occupations: Painter, educator
- Movement: Impressionism

İbrahim Çallı (13 July 1882 – 22 May 1960), popularly known as Çallı İbrahim, was a Turkish painter and educator. He was a founding members of the Society of Ottoman Painters. He trained many young painters as a professor at Mimar Sinan Fine Arts University (formerly Academy of Fine Arts, Istanbul) and they were called the 1914 Generation of artists, is also known as the Çallı Generation.

== Biography ==
İbrahim Çallı was born on 13 July 1882 in Çal, Denizli. He showed early interest in painting during his primary and secondary education which he finished in his hometown and in İzmir.

In 1899 he went to Istanbul where he worked in several jobs while he continued painting. Meanwhile, he took drawing lessons from an Armenian-origin Ottoman painter Roben Efendi at the Grand Bazaar. With the support of Şeker Ahmet Paşa he entered the Mimar Sinan Fine Arts University (formerly Academy of Fine Arts, Istanbul) in 1906. At the Academy of Fine Arts, Istanbul he studied under artist Bedri Rahmi Eyüboğlu.

Graduating the school with the highest degree after four years, Çallı was sent to France with a fellowship from government where he studied under Fernand Cormon. During his years in France he didn't pay much attention to upcoming movements like cubism, he embraced a free style close to impressionism. With the outbreak of World War I, he returned home and was appointed assistant to Salvatore Valeri at Mimar Sinan Fine Arts University. During the war he produced war-themed paintings in the studio founded by the War Minister Enver Pasha with other artists among them Ali Sami Boyar.

== Death and legacy ==
He retired in 1947 and he died of gastrointestinal bleeding on 22 May 1960 in Istanbul.

In 2014, his painting "Avluda Oturanlar" (English: "People Sitting in Courtyard") dated from 1913, sold for a record price at auction.
