= YKY =

YKY or yky may refer to:

- Yapı Kredi Yayınları, a Turkish publisher (founded 1992)
- Yakoma language, spoken in Central Africa (ISO 639-3:yky)
- Kindersley Regional Airport, Saskatchewan, Canada (IATA:YKY)
