= National Palaces Painting Museum =

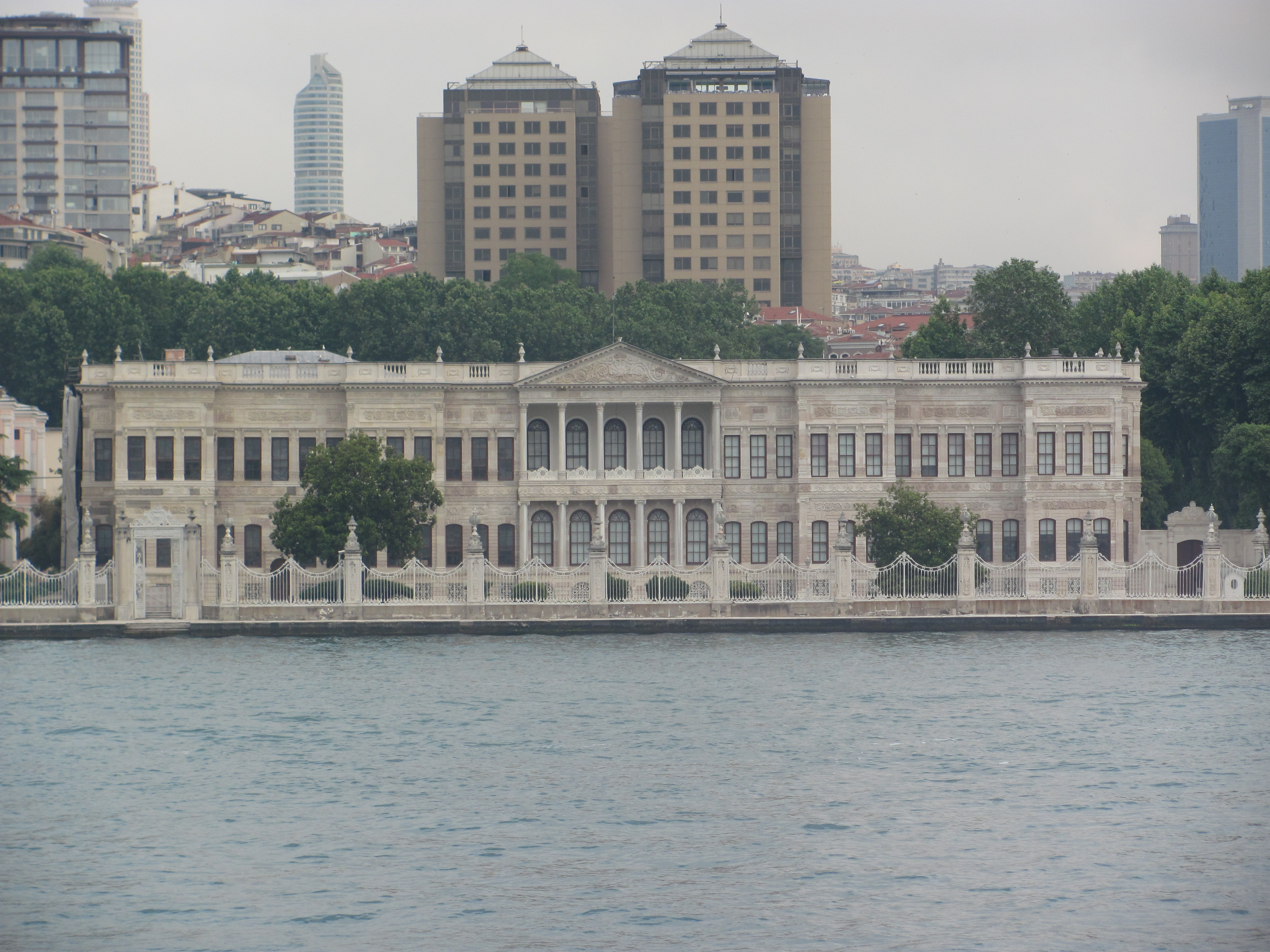
Museum as seen from the ferry to Beşiktaş

The National Palaces Painting Museum (Turkish: Milli Saraylar Resim Müzesi) is an art museum in Istanbul, Turkey, opened at the Crown Prince Residence of Dolmabahçe Palace in 2014. The museum exhibits approximately 200 pieces from the palace's collection of paintings by both Turkish and international artists of the 19th century. The museum is funded by the TBMM.

== History ==
The historical building previously housed the Istanbul Art and Sculpture Museum, which was founded during the term of Turkey's first president Mustafa Kemal Atatürk in 1937 and served as part of Mimar Sinan Fine Arts University. Following renovations in 2010-2014, 19th and early-20th century art from the palaces of the Ottoman dynasty were relocated here.

== Collections ==
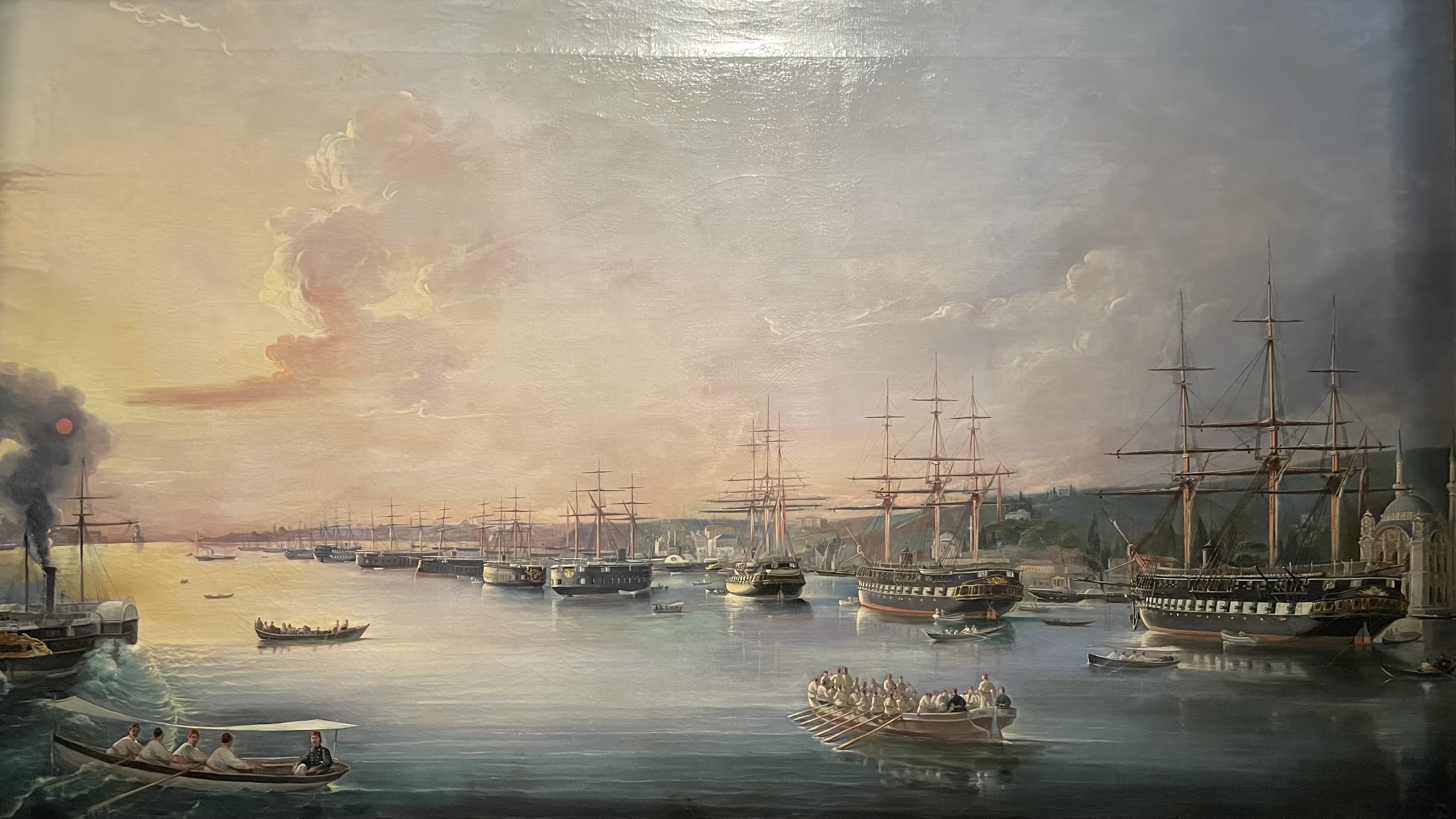
Ottoman fleet in front of Ortaköy Mosque in Istanbul

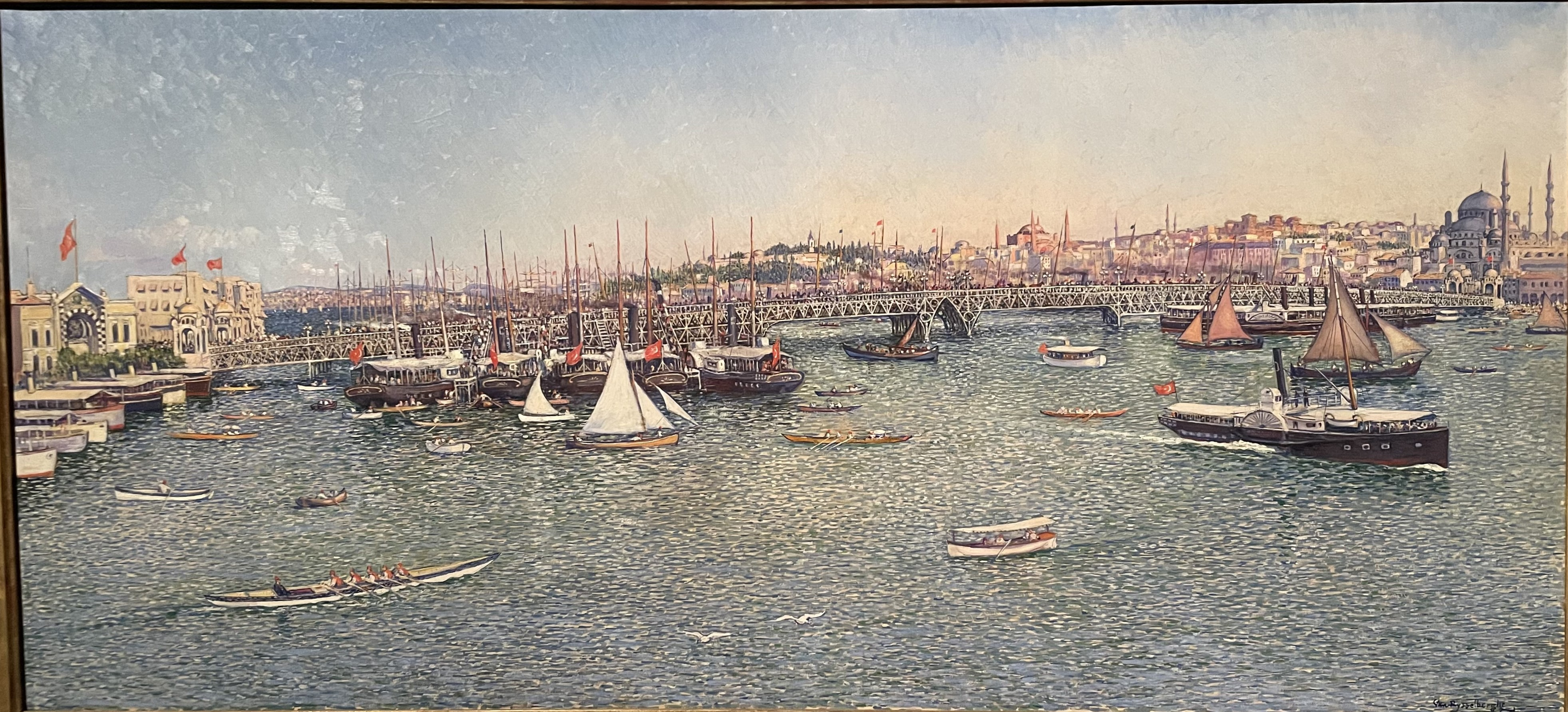
The Galata Bridge during the Ottoman era

Over 200 paintings are displayed in 11 sections.

=== Paintings by Turkish artists (1870-1930) ===
This collection consists of works by Ottoman/Turkish artists such as Şeker Ahmed Pasha, Osman Hamdi Bey, Hüseyin Zekai Pasha and Hodja Ali Rıza, who make up the second, third and fourth generation of Turkish painting in the Western sense.

=== Paintings by court painters ===
Works by artists such as Stanislaw Chlebowski and Fausto Zonaro, who respectively served Abdulaziz and Abdülhamid II as their court painters.

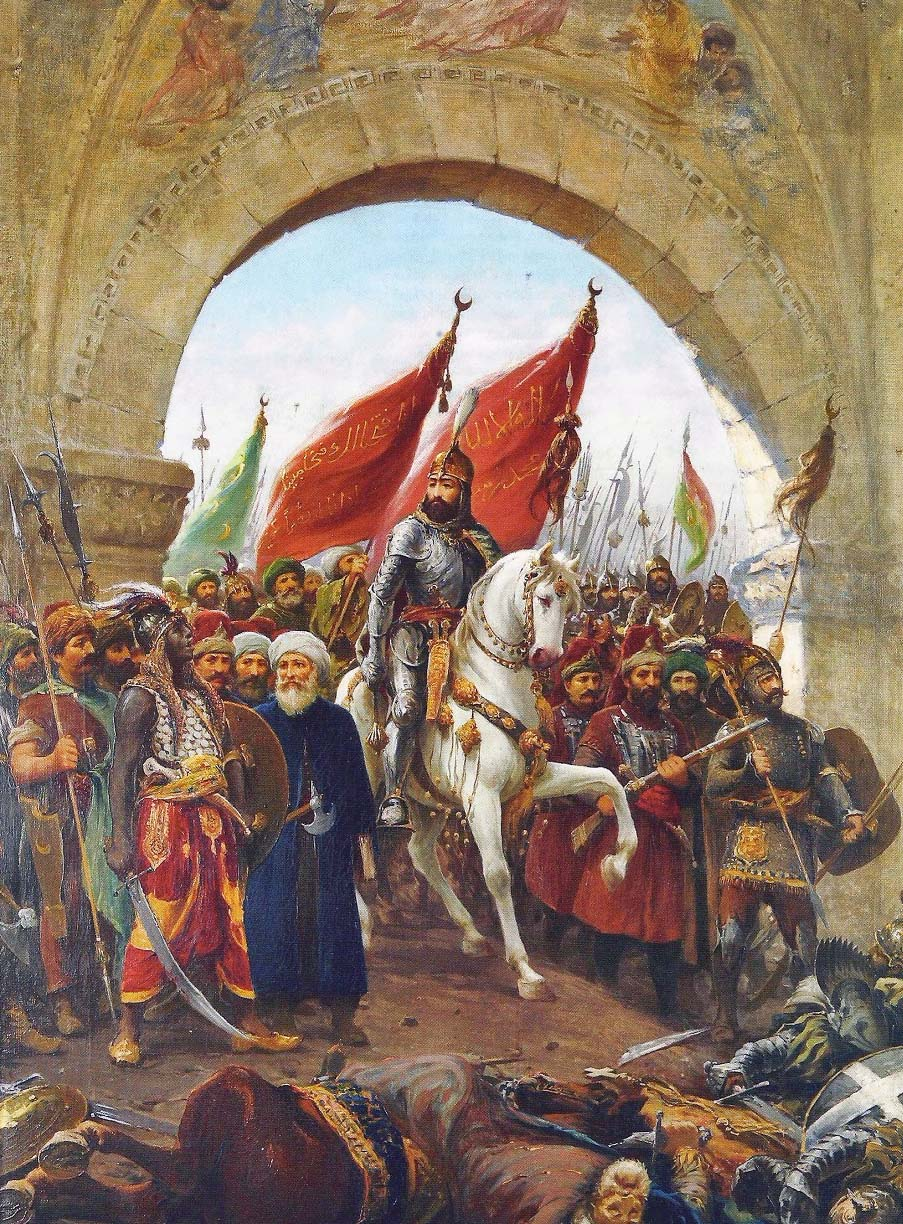
Mehmed II Entering Constantinople. Painting by Fausto Zonaro.

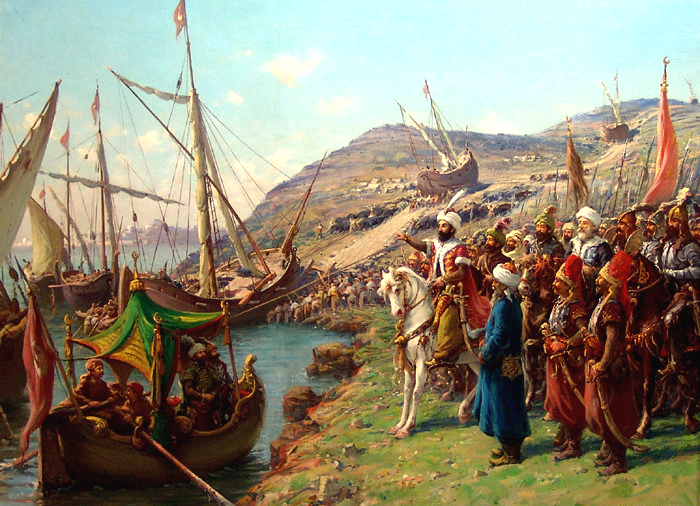
Mehmed II at the Siege of Constantinople. Painting by Fausto Zonaro.

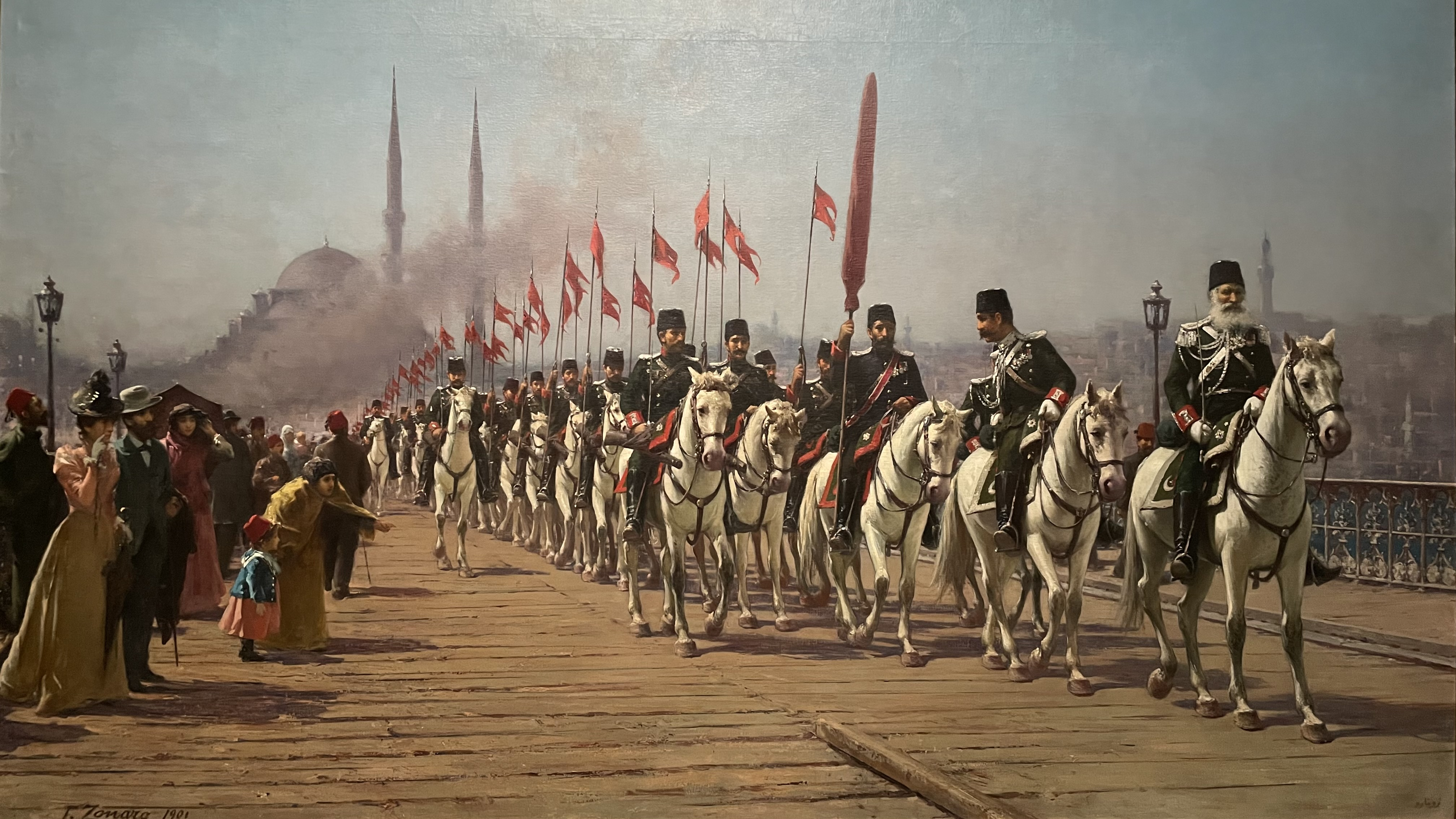
The Imperial Regiment of the Ertugrul on the Galata Bridge. Painting by Fausto Zonaro.

=== Paintings from Goupil Gallery ===
Two sections consist of paintings that were bought from the Goupil Gallery in Paris during the reign of Abdulaziz. The paintings that were bought in this era reflect the taste of Sultan Abdulaziz and his assistant Şeker Ahmed Pasha. A Western-style collection of paintings was brought together for the first time at the Dolmabahçe Palace during the reign of Sultan Abdulaziz.

=== Paintings by Ivan Aivazovsky ===
The Ceremony Hall, which is the most magnificent room of the structure with its stucco-lined walls and composite-headed plasters, is allocated to the Russian artist Aivazovsky.

=== Paintings by Abdülmecid II ===
The hall that exhibits this collection originally used to be the library of Abdülmecid II himself, who was born to become the last crown prince and caliph of the Ottoman dynasty. Interested in almost all branches of art, but particularly calligraphy and music, he remained a celebrated artist of Turkish painting.

=== Orientalist paintings ===
The museum has a rich collection of works by 19th century Orientalist painters.

== See also ==
- Istanbul Museum of Painting and Sculpture
- Pera Museum
- History of modern Turkish painting
- List of art museums
