= Maya Kulenovic =

Canadian artist working in painting and sculpture (born 1975)

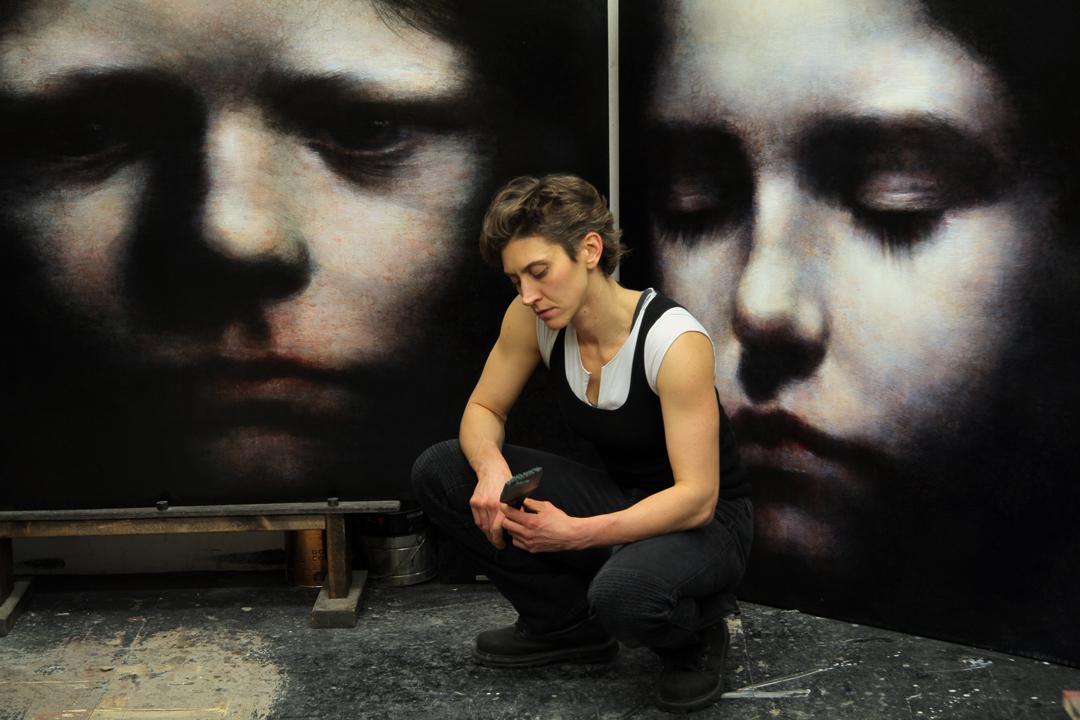
- Born: March 1, 1975 (age 51); Sarajevo, SFR Yugoslavia
- Education: Ontario College of Art and Design University, University of the Arts London, Mimar Sinan University
- Known for: Painting, Drawing, Sculpture
- Movement: Metamodernism, Contemporary Realism

Maya Kulenovic (born 1975) is a Canadian artist working in painting and sculpture. She lives and works in Toronto, Ontario, Canada and exhibits internationally.

== Biography ==
Kulenovic was born in 1975 in Sarajevo, SR Bosnia and Herzegovina, SFR Yugoslavia.

She studied at Ontario College of Art and Design University in Toronto, Ontario, Canada; Mimar Sinan University in Istanbul, Turkey; and Chelsea College of Art and Design (University of the Arts London) in London, England. She is also an alumna of Goodenough College in London, England.

A book about the work of Maya Kulenovic by Edward Lucie-Smith in Dutch and English was published by d'jonge Hond in the Netherlands in 2007.

Her second monograph, Maya Kulenovic: Fugue, with an essay by Mark Kingwell, was published in Toronto in 2017.

== Commentary ==
Whether with portraits, which she terms "faces"; architecture, referred to as "build" works; landscapes or still life images, Kulenovic's focus is to capture an ambience or psychological state. She deliberately explores ambiguity, and in her approach to the painted surface she works in glazed layers as well as destructive techniques to create images evoking a particular atemporal context. Although so very different in subject, the works have the same aura of loneliness, stillness and desire.

Her influences range from sculpture and painting to architecture, photography and film, and include Roman death masks, 19th-century daguerreotype photography, documentary films, stills from damaged motion pictures, Eugène Atget, Margaret Bourke-White, Rembrandt, Turner and Francis Bacon.

Edward Lucie-Smith wrote the following about Kulenovic's work: "No-one could describe Maya Kulenovic's paintings as 'photographic', but their place in the realist tradition is nevertheless secure. Her work is realist in the way that Rembrandt and Goya are realist. They attempt to explore the essence of human existence, and often come up with uncomfortable truths. These truths are conveyed through paintings that fall into very specific categories, related to the old hierarchy of genres that was discarded by the pioneering Modernists, in Kulenovic's work we find still life paintings, portraits (of a sort), landscapes and architectural compositions"

The still lifes, the architectural compositions, the faces and the landscapes are all, in their essence, attempts to identify and present a particular state of being. This quality is, as Edward Lucie-Smith states, "the thing that makes her work so haunting, and so unlike the work of any other artist of her own generation that I can immediately think of".

== Sources ==
- Edward Lucie-Smith, (translation by B. Ruijsenaars) "Maya Kulenovic" (d'jonge Hond/Netherlands 2008), 1 vol. Hardcover (128 p.), ISBN 90-8910-045-8
- Mark Kingwell, "Measure Yourself Against the Earth: Essays", pages 228-233, (Biblioasis, 2015) ISBN 1771960469
- Mark Kingwell, Anthony Collins, "Maya Kulenovic: Fugue", (Toronto, Ontario, Canada/2017), 1 vol. Hardcover (144 p.), ISBN 9780995899308
