= İstasyon Academy of Fine Arts =

İstasyon Academy of Fine Arts (Turkish: İstasyon Sanat Akademisi) is a private art institution founded by architect Ömer Ferda Düzenli and artist/painter Hülya Düzenli in Fındıklı, Istanbul in 1980. Artists Nurullah Berk and Sabri Berkel’s concepts on modern education and culture influenced the discipline and views of the institute.

İstasyon Academy/school of Fine Arts was the first institution to focus on widespread art education in Turkey. It was modeled after the workshops of Andre Lhote and Fernand Léger in Paris.

In its early years, sculptor Seyhun Topuz, artist/painter Tomur Atagök and artist/painter Gün İrk laid the foundations of its teaching doctrine. In later years, sculptor Mehmet Şenel, artist/painter Adnan Çoker and musician/composer Timur Selçuk further developed their work.

Modeled after the Bauhaus art school the institution created a system that combined industry-related art disciplines with the master-apprentice tradition.

== Disciplines taught ==
The disciplines taught in the institution are:

- Art for Adults
- Interior Design
- Fashion Design
- Advertisement / Graphic Design
- Jewellery Design
- Preparation for fine arts exams / Portfolio Training
- Design and Oil-paint Workshop
- Archaeology / Art History
- Art for Kids

Courses include:

- certificates that are approved by Ministry of Education of the Turkish Republic for employment;
- university diplomas, from 2 years in IAFA and 2 years in a contracted university in the United Kingdom;
- personal interest and recreation.

Students who take full-time education for two years have the opportunity to transfer and continue their studies at an advanced level at University of Portsmouth for Fashion, Graphic Design and Fine Art. Those who complete two years of coursework may attain university graduation at the end of four years. IAFA is recognized as a Foundation College in the universities in United Kingdom.
