= Nihal Güres =

Turkish artist and writer

- Born: Nihal Güres; 1962; Ankara
- Education: Sabri Berkel, Neşe Aybey
- Website: www.nihalgures.com (down)

Nihal Güres (born 1962 in Ankara) is a Turkish artist and writer.

She is also sometimes referred to as Nihal Gürses.

== Early life and education ==
Nihal Güres was born in 1962 in Ankara. She was educated in literature and language of Latin and Greek variety at the Istanbul University classical languages and filology department.

She received her art education from Sabri Berkel and Neşe Aybey.

She worked with Berkel on contemporary art the İstasyon art Academy and was educated in miniature by Aybey at the Basın Müzesi.

She had worked as a flight attendant at Turkish Airlines for some time, however quit this job after she got married and then started to take miniature lessons from the Master of Miniature Art, Neşe Aybey. Aybey then later directed her to the İstasyon art Academy where she met Sabri Berkel. From there under the guidance of Berkel she held her first exhibition in 1993.

== Career ==
She held her first art exhibition named Paintings and Light in 1992 at the Marmara Hotel Art Gallery in 1992 and since then has held more than 30 personal exhibitions, and has participated in about 50 collaborative exhibitions. She worked at the hand made paper atelier at Yildiz University with Remzi Koklu and at various art and friendship organisations with Semiha Berksoy. She is also a writer. She is the author books including UNTITLED 19.5/13.5 CM KAĞIT ÜZERİNE KARIŞIK TEKNİK (1994) and Ölünce de Kırmızı Ruj Sürüyor Musunuz? (2019), and has also written in Finansal Forum, Yaşasın Edebiyat and Sanat Çevresi. She writes about art and her travels around the world which have included Bali and Poland.

== Exhibitions ==
- Paintings and Light, Marmara Hotel Art Gallery, 1992
- Güzel Sanatlar Birliği Resim Derneği, 96.Yıl Bahar Sergisi, Taksim Art Gallery, ( -25 April) 2005
- Çok Çok Çok Mutlu Öpüşen Balıklar, İstanbul Sanayi Odası Sanat Galerisi, (11-28 August) 2015
- Fırça, Ayşe Takı Galerisi (14-30 June) 2021
- Parlak-Seksi-Trendi, Taksim Art Gallery (18 April)
- Geleneksel Adalı Ressamlar, Adalar Kültür Derneği, (27 August - 2 September) 2022

== Books ==
- Güres, Nihal (1994). UNTITLED 19.5/13.5 CM KAĞIT ÜZERİNE KARIŞIK TEKNİK. Istanbul: Çetin Yayınlar.
- Güres, Nihal (2019). Ölünce de Kırmızı Ruj Sürüyor Musunuz? (1st ed.). Kora Yayın. ISBN 9786055601775.
