= Erinc Seymen =

Turkish artist (born 1980)

Erinç Seymen (born 1980 Istanbul) is a Turkish artist.

== Life ==
He graduated from Mimar Sinan Fine Arts University, Painting Department in 2006 and received his MA from Yıldız Technical University Art and Design Faculty, with a thesis about Bob Flanagan.

He participated in conferences and his articles has been published in various magazines on topics such as militarism, nationalism and gender issues. Since 2002, he has participated in several solo and group exhibitions in Istanbul, Ankara, Vienna, Paris, London, Helsinki, Eindhoven and Lisbon. The group exhibitions he participated in are: "Along the Gates of Urban", K&S Galerie, Berlin (2004); "An Atlas of Events", Foundation Calouste Gulbenkian, Lisbon (2007); "I Myself am War!", Open Space, Vienna (2008); "Istanbul, traversée", Palais des Beaux Arts de Lille, Lille (2009); "Moods: A Generation that Goes off the Rails", École nationale supérieure des Beaux-Arts, Paris (2010). Erinc Seymen lives and works in Istanbul.

== Selected solo exhibitions ==
2009

- Art Forum Berlin (Galerist Solo Booth), Berlin / Germany
- Persuasion Room, Galerist, Istanbul / Turkey

2007

- Man Jam, Finnish Museum of Photography, Helsinki / Finland
- Gays Can Shoot Straight Too, Van Abbemuseum, Eindhoven / NL
- Hunting Season, Galerist, Istanbul / Turkey

2006

- Untitled, Masa Project, Istanbul / Turkey

2005

- Violation Exercises, Galerist, Istanbul / Turkey

2003

- Uncanny Distance, Galerist, Istanbul / Turkey

== Selected group exhibitions ==
2010

- Atesin Dustugu Yer, Depo, Istanbul / Turkey
- Port İzmir 2, İnternational Contemporary Art Triennial, Izmir / Turkey
- When Ideas Become Crime, Depo, Istanbul / Turkey
- Istanbul Cool! What's Happening in Contemporary Turkish Art Now, Leila Taghinia-Milani Heler (LTMH) gallery, New York / USA
- État D'ames, École nationale supérieure des Beaux-Arts, Paris / France

2009

- Istanbul Traversee, Lille 3000, Lille / France
- Materiak.picture, Operation Room, Istanbul / Turkey

2008

- Moment of Agency – Filmprogram, Kunsthalle Basel, Basel / Switzerland
- I Myself am War, Open Space, Vienna / Austria
- Save as.. Triennale Bosiva, Milano / Italy
- Reasonable, Hafriyat, Istanbul / Turkey
- Photonic Moments, Fotogalerie des Rathaus, Graz / Austria
- Photonic Moments, Gallery of the Cankarjev Dom Cultural Center, Ljubljana / Slovenia

2007

- Be a Realist, Demand the İmpossible!, Karşı Sanat, Istanbul / Turkey
- Istanbul Now, Lukas Feichtner Galerie, Istanbul / Turkey
- Border-Disorder, Kraljevo / Serbia
- An Atlas of Events, Calouste Gulbenkian Foundation, Antonio Pinto Ribeiro, Lisbon / Portugal
- Alternative Election Posters, Hafriyat, Istanbul / Turkey
- Working Space, Pera Museum, Istanbul / Turkey
- Flat Tire K2, Izmir / Turkey

2006

- Home and Away, UGM Gallery, Maribor / Slovenia
- Ardindan Degil Karşısına, Radikal Art, Bremen / Germany
- Topkapi, Künstlerhaus Guterabfertigund, Bremen / Germany
- Visions, Hotel Athens Imperial, Athens / Greece
- Works on Paper, Galerist, Istanbul / Turkey

2005

- Free Kick, Antrepo No.5, Istanbul / Turkey

2004

- Along the Gates of Urban, K&S Galerie, Berlin / Germany
- Along the Gates of Urban, Oda Projesi, Istanbul / Turkey
- Visitor, Galerist, Istanbul / Turkey

2003

- I'm too Sad to Kill You, Proje4L, Istanbul / Turkey
- Good, Bad and Ugly, Atölye 111, Bilgi University, Istanbul / Turkey

2002

- Under the Beach: the Pavement, Proje4L, Istanbul / Turkey
