= Sinem Banna =

Turkish artist (born 1968)

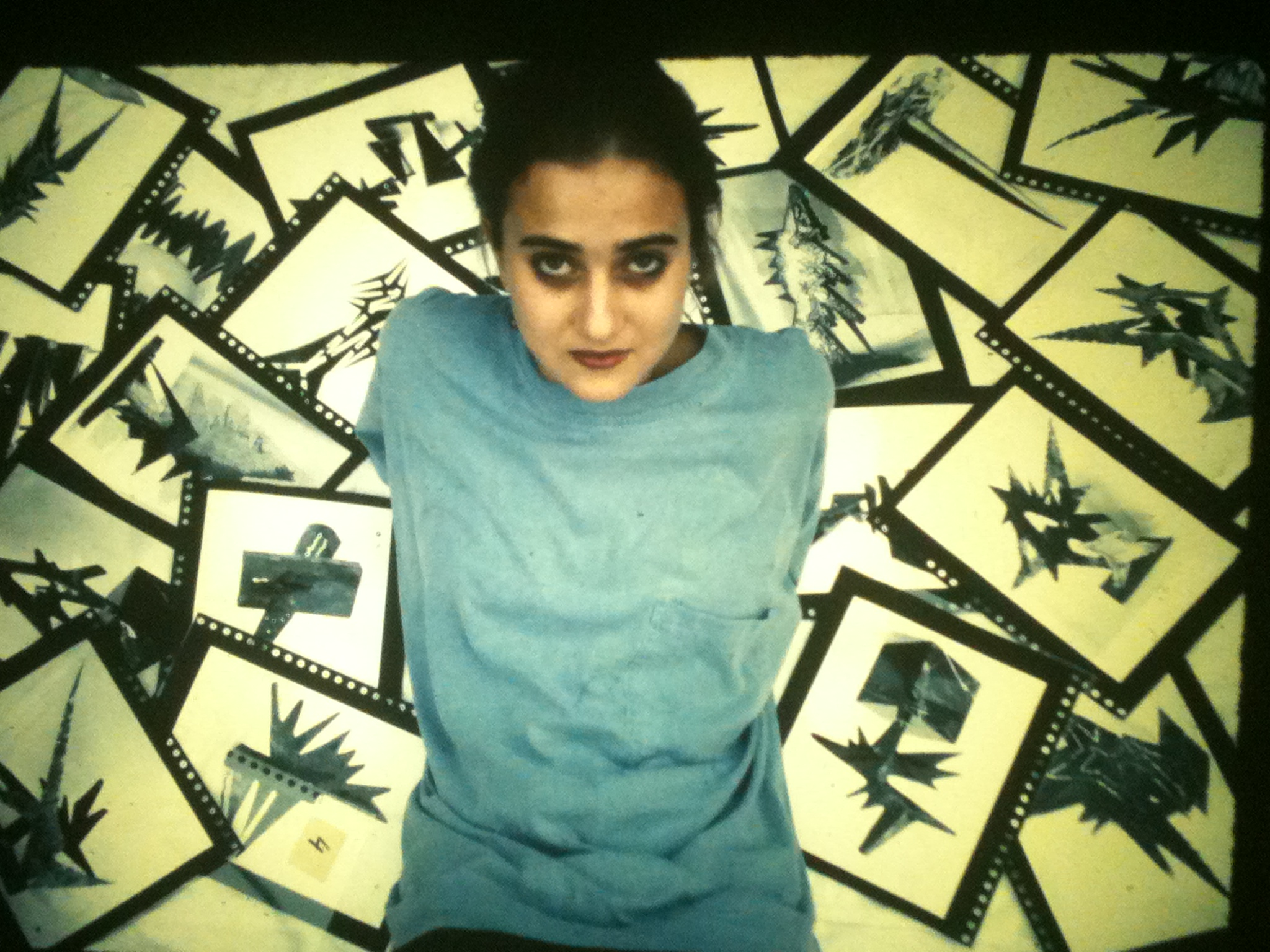
- Banna with a collection of images from her Fear Series, 1990
- Born: 1968 (age 57–58); Istanbul, Turkey
- Education: Mimar Sinan Fine Arts University, Istanbul, Turkey; Villa Arson, Nice, France; Sorbonne University, Paris, France; San Francisco Art Institute, San Francisco, California, United States
- Known for: Sculpture, Installation art, Conceptual art
- Website: sinembanna.com

Sinem Banna (/bɑːnə/; born 1968) is a Turkish-American artist currently living and working in both San Francisco, California, and her home town of Istanbul, Turkey and exhibits internationally.

Banna works in several disciplines, mainly sculpture and assemblage/collage, site specific installations, and murals. Her work often consists of three-dimensional compositions. A number of her works incorporate objects such as toy parts, tea glasses, and coffee beans so as to capture cultural signs and symbols in her work. She works frequently with Plexiglas constructions as well as light boxes.

== Biography ==
In 1989, Sinem Banna received her BFA in Ceramics and Glass at Mimar Sinan University in Istanbul, Turkey. She continued her training in France—first at the Villa Arson in Nice, and then at Sorbonne University in Paris. Banna then moved to the United States where she received her MFA in sculpture at the San Francisco Art Institute in California in 1994. In 1997, Banna was granted US citizenship through the First Preference EB-1 Visa for Extraordinary Ability in the arts— with the USCIS sourcing a Pulitzer, Oscar, and Olympic Medal, under examples of eligibility criteria.

== Career ==
=== Overview ===
Sinem Banna had her first solo exhibition in 1995 in Taksim Square in Istanbul, Turkey. Since then, she has shown her work throughout Europe and the United States. Exhibitions include those in the US cities of San Francisco, New York, New Mexico, and Los Angeles.

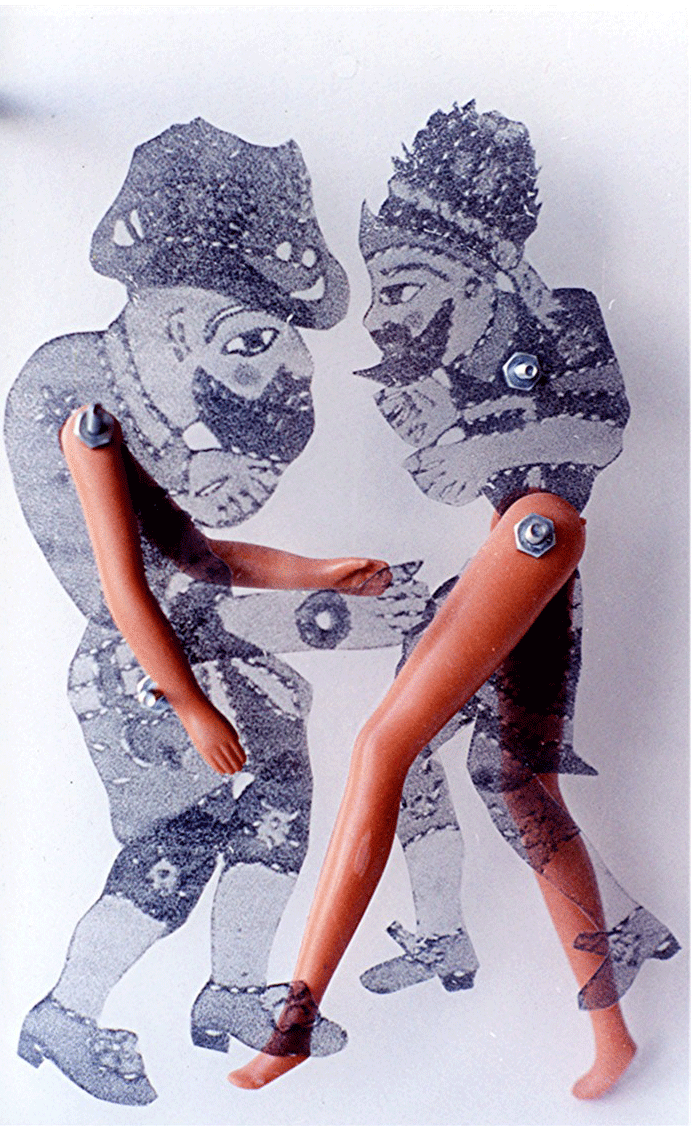
Banna's "Shadows at Noon" at the 2004 Athens Olympics. Artiade "Olympics of Visual Art" grant recipient.

Internationally, Banna's exhibitions include the European cities of Istanbul, Nice, Copenhagen, Elsinore, and the 2004 Athens Olympics where Banna was selected as a cultural ambassador of art for the United States and Turkey. Upon this, Banna showed her work "Shadows at Noon" at the 2004 Athens Olympics, and received a grant under The Artiade "Olympics of Visual Art".

Sinem Banna has been reported by US and international media-- including the New York Times, CNN Turkey, the San Francisco Examiner, SF Weekly, and newspaper distributors in Europe including Cumhuriyet, Milliyet, and Sabah. In addition to printed publications, Banna's lectures, talks, and interviews have appeared on news channels and public radio stations.

=== Selected public works and site-specific installations ===
==== 1994 ====
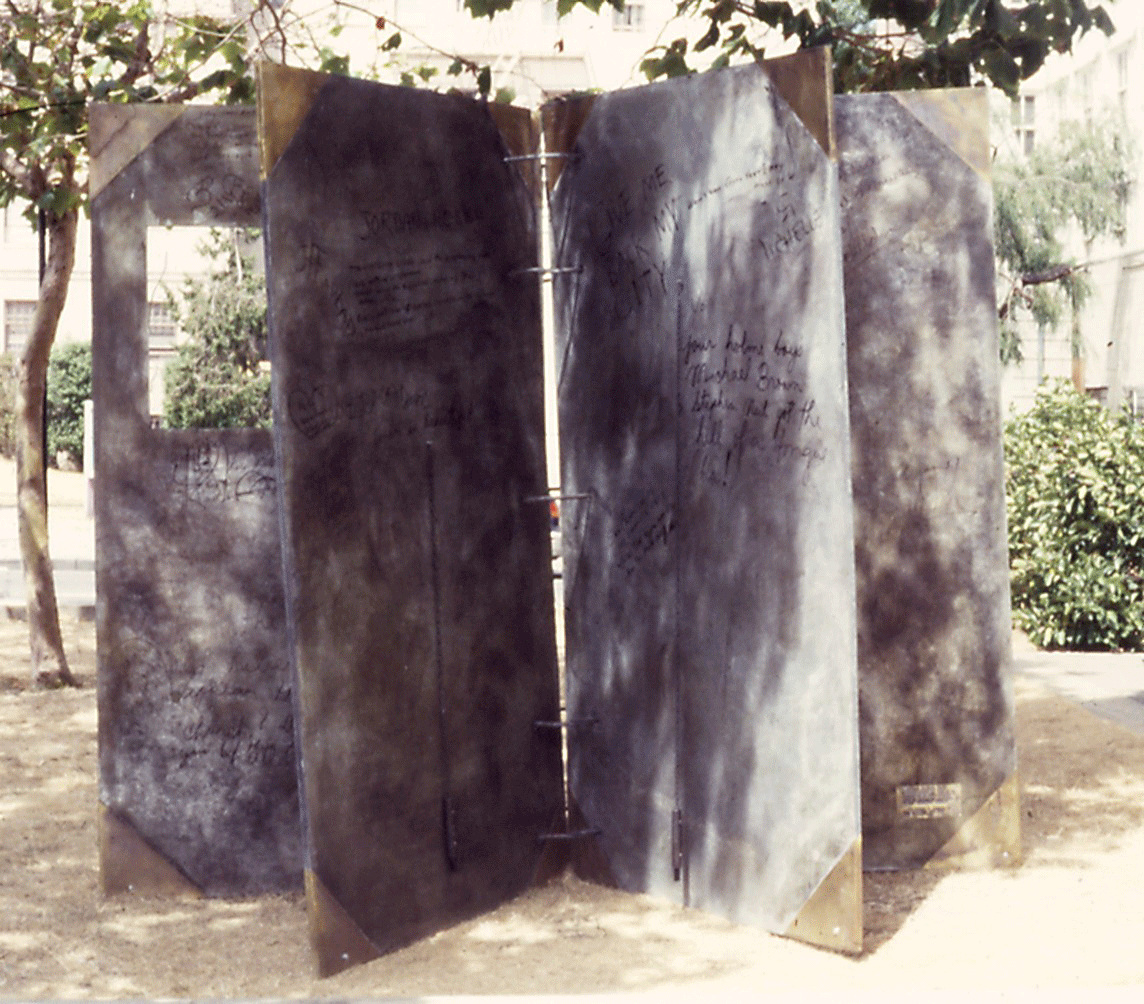
Sinem Banna, "Street Almanac", "San Francisco Talks with Different Voices" - outdoor site-specific installation located in front of the San Francisco Library in San Francisco, California.

Banna was awarded a Grant under the Lef Foundation for her work the "Almanac Project", "San Francisco talks with different voices". This outdoor site-specific installation was located in front of the San Francisco Library in Civic Center, San Francisco, California. The work, a metal almanac with a seven-foot tall page, invited viewers and the public to put down their thoughts, in writing, on the artwork—thus constructing one large book of the voices of the San Francisco Community.

==== 2006 ====
Banna was awarded a residency grant from the Silicon Valley Community Foundation The work, entitled "HEAR ME", is a permanent sculpture located in San Mateo Central Park, and was installed in 2009. The wood and metal bench surrounds a red maple tree and incorporates visual art and text from children in various educational programs in San Mateo County, aimed at children with autism, emotional challenges, and other special needs. The children who helped design the bench included students from the Wings Learning Center for autistic children, and the Edgewood Center for Children and Families, which serves emotionally abused or disturbed children. Banna also affixed 40 small silver bells to the bottom of the bench, which rang with any light breeze. The sculpture bench is five feet in diameter, and contains a circular seat consisting of 29 panels radiating outward; on which are imprinted children's words, phrases, and drawings. A smaller upper metal ring is placed four and a half feet high, hanging from which are the silver bells.

==== 2009–2012 ====
In conjunction with several different schools in the San Mateo Community and SMFC in California, Banna created several murals and site specific installations.

Of these include the following:

- "Always Hope"; site specific mural at the entrance of the dance studio at the Horrall School in San Mateo.
- "Opening Doors"; outdoor site specific community project consisting of works throughout art history recreated on 24 vintage doors by children, grades K-5, under the supervision and direction of artist in residence Sinem Banna. Located at the courtyard of the Horrall School, San Mateo.
- "Say Hi"; site specific mural located at Horrall School, San Mateo under the educational and interactive project.
- "Peace and Love"; collaborative site specific mural at Baywood Elementary School, San Mateo.
- "Say Hi II"; interactive mural study as community event located in Baywood Elementary School, San Mateo.
- "B.With"; site specific mural, assemblage of mixed media with tiles, located in Borel Middle School, San Mateo. Dedicated to the memory of sixth grade student, Miranda, who died due to leukemia in 2010. Consists of eighty-seven 4x4 tiles with the Class of 2012 8th graders each making their own tile, in addition to eighty to a hundred 4x4 tiles of Miranda's own art work, digitally imposed on the tile. Three five-foot penguins patterned after the penguins above Miranda's bed after her Make a Wish Foundation, Room Make Over. The dedication by Tammie Bosley, mother of Miranda, said "I keep reminding myself to take deep breathes; it is simply beautiful in so many ways. Every time I visit it, I find something new. It certainly has a life of its own,". Installation June 2012; Dedication August 2012.

==== 2013 ====
Banna was invited by the San Mateo Downtown Association for project "Meter Garden", consisting of parking meters for public art.

The project stations seven painted, decommissioned parking meters in the heart of downtown. The San Mateo Department of Public Works facilitated the project as well as its public display on East Third Avenue in San Mateo, California.

=== Professional activities ===
In 2005, Banna accepted a seat on the Board of Directors of the San Mateo City Arts Committee. In this same year she began work as curator of solo and group exhibitions throughout the US. Banna has worked as a lecturer as well as an educator for over 10 years at several different universities and educational institutions. Banna held several juror positions, and founded ‘Art Box' in 2006.

For over five years, Banna worked as an editor and as the United States representative for Art in Turkey magazine and Milliyet art magazine of Istanbul.

== Awards and honors ==
Award	Title	Location	Year
Golden Turk Awards	Nominated	United States	2013
San Mateo Foster City School District	Residency Grant	San Mateo, CA	2008-2011
City of San Mateo Arts Committee	Project Grant	San Mateo, CA	2009
Peninsula (Silicon Valley) Community Foundation	Residency Grant	San Mateo, CA	2006
Turkish Municipal Olympics Athens	Project Grant	Athens, Greece	2004
Istanbul Dibay Kimya	Project Grant	Istanbul, Turkey	2004
Elusive Mind, The Brain and Stamp	First Prize	Copenhagen, Denmark	1997
The LEF Foundation	Project Grant	San Francisco	1994
Secessions Gallery	Project Grant	San Francisco	1993
San Francisco Art Institute	Grant	San Francisco	1992
