= Nazmi Ziya Güran =

Turkish artist (1881–1937)

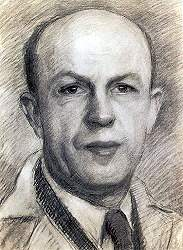
Self-portrait (c.1930)

Nazmi Ziya Güran (1881 – 11 September 1937) was a Turkish Impressionist painter and art teacher.

== Biography ==
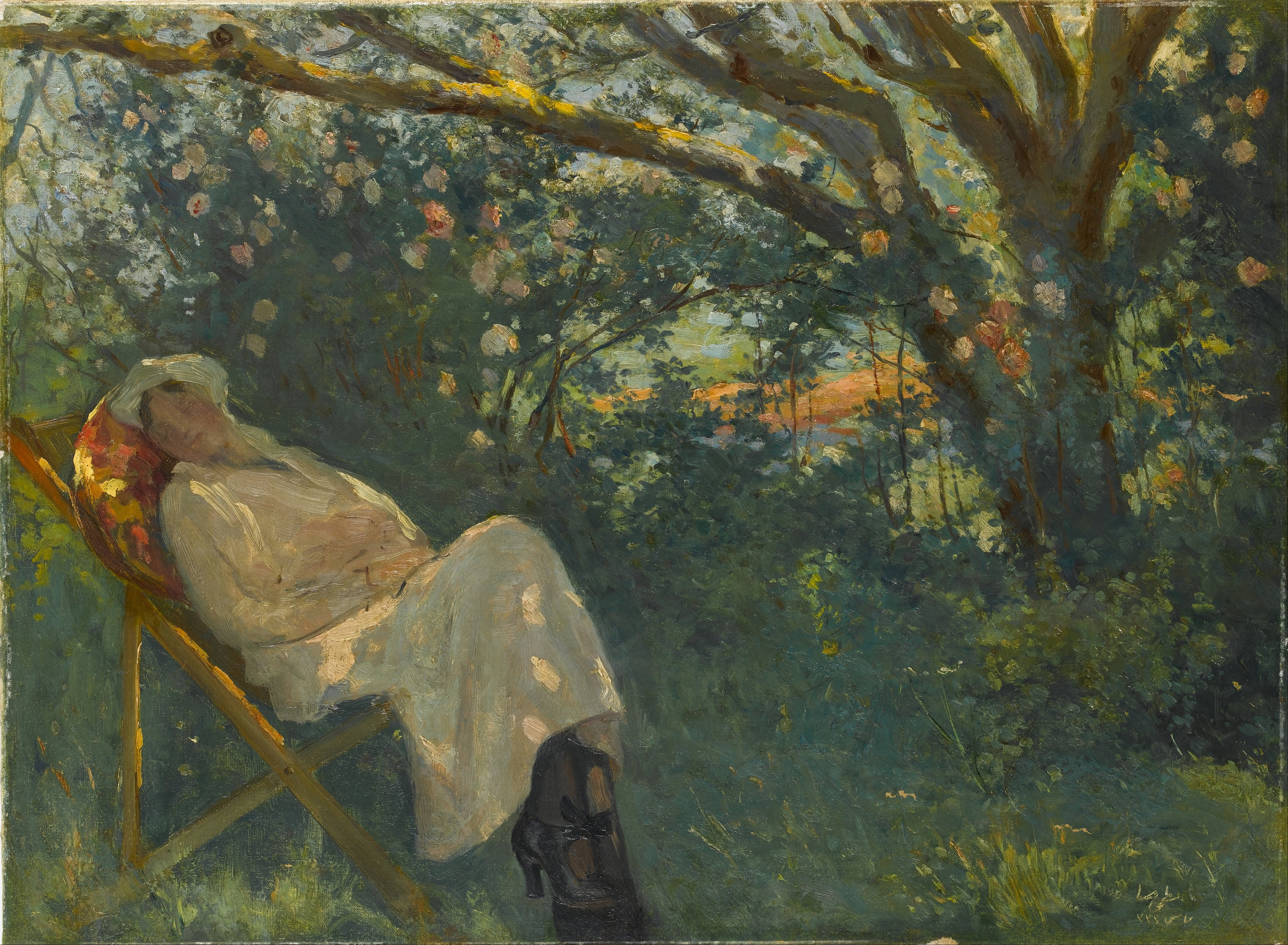
Lady in Pink on a Chaise Longue (1904)

He was born in Istanbul. His father was a civil servant. He attended Vefa Lisesi, Turkey's first non-military high school, then studied at the Civil Service Academy (now the Faculty of Political Science, Ankara University). Having been interested in art since he was a child, he asked his family to let him attend classes at the Istanbul Academy of Fine Arts, but his request was denied and he graduated from the Academy in 1901.

He did manage to obtain some private tutoring from Hoca Ali Riza then, following his father's death in 1902, he quietly enrolled at the Academy. He studied with the Italian Orientalist painter, Salvatore Valeri and the sculptor Osgan Efendi, but had some difficulty adapting to the school's conservative teaching methods and came into conflict with Osman Hamdi Bey, the Director. A meeting with the French painter Paul Signac, who visited Istanbul while sailing around the Mediterranean, may have influenced his desired style. The conflicts continued and, in 1907, when he submitted his final exam pictures, he found his graduation delayed by a year.

Tired of waiting, he went to Paris in 1908. After briefly attending classes at the Académie Julian, he worked in the studios of Marcel Baschet and Lionel Royer. Then, he enrolled at the École nationale supérieure des Beaux-Arts and studied with Fernand Cormon. He also made meticulous copies of paintings at the Louvre, spending two months on Antoine Coypel's portrait of Democritus, alone.

After travelling in Germany and Austria, he returned home in 1914, settling in İzmir, where he found employment at the Teacher's College and worked as an inspector for the provincial Directorate of Education. To help support his family during the war years, he turned to other activities, such as poultry farming and shoemaking. After the war, he served as Director of the "Industrial School of Fine Arts" for several non-consecutive years while continuing to pursue his landscape painting, often painting the same scene at different times of day to capture the changes in light. He also opened a private art school. In 1928, one of his paintings was purchased by King Amanullah Khan of Afghanistan.

Although he participated in the annual "Galatasaray Exhibition", he did not exhibit extensively until 1937, when he was given his own sections at a major exposition held by the Art Society. With great enthusiasm, he helped move and set up dozens of works. This much exertion in the August heat led to a case of extreme exhaustion, from which he never fully recovered, dying of a heart attack not long after.

== Selected paintings ==
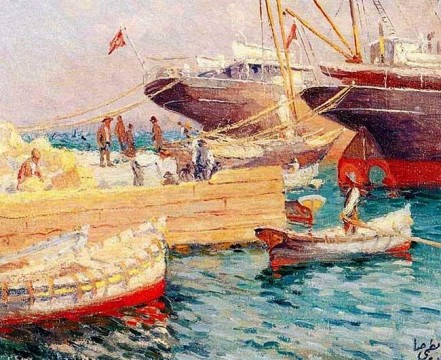
Harbor Scene

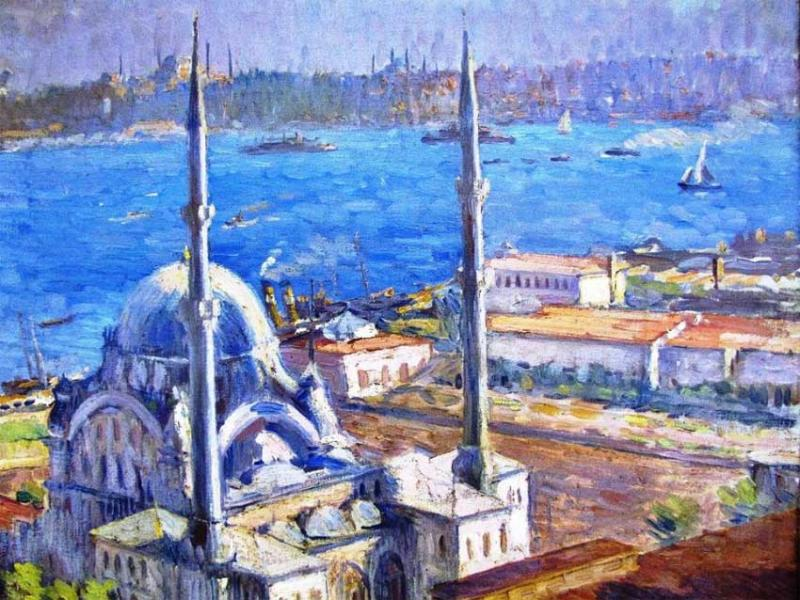
Nusretiye Mosque in Tophane

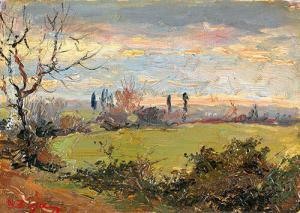
Landscape

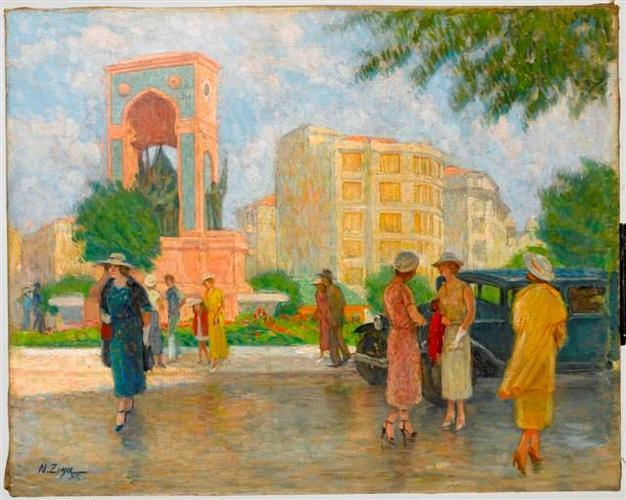
Taksim Square
