= Şükriye Dikmen =

Turkish artist (1918–2000)

- Born: Ayşe Şükriye Dikmen; 1918; Constantinople, Ottoman Empire
- Died: 16 September 2000 (aged 81–82)
- Education: Istanbul State Academy of Fine Arts; Ecole du Louvre
- Known for: Painting

Ayşe Şükriye Dikmen (1918 – 16 September 2000), was a Turkish painter. She is known for her portraits of women and young girls.

== Biography ==
Şükriye Dikmen was born in Constantinople in 1918. Her father was Cafer Fahri Bey from Batumi of Georgian descent and a microbiologist of the early Republican era. She is the older sister of painter Tiraje Dikmen, and the niece of Ali Dikmen, a member of the Ottoman parliament Meclis-i Mebusan, and later a member of the Grand National Assembly.

Dikmen received her pre-university education at the Robert College in Arnavutköy finishing in 1942. Six years later in 1948, she completed her education at the Painting Department of the Istanbul State Academy of Fine Arts, and then went to Paris, France. In 1953, she graduated from the Art history Department of the Ecole du Louvre in Paris, and worked three years with Fernand Léger and two years with Sengier Chastel and Roger Chastel. In 1953, she opened her first solo exhibition, and the next year she had her first solo exhibition in Turkey.

In 1957, Dikmen participated in the exhibition of contemporary Turkish arts exhibition in Edinburgh, Scotland, and then in similar exhibitions during 1962 in Paris, Brussels, and Vienna. In 1968, she organized a retrospective exhibition gathering both her old and new works.

She died on 16 September 2000.
