= Neşe Aybey =

Turkish painter and academic

- Born: Neşe Duyar; 2 March 1930
- Died: 4 January 2015 (aged 84); Istanbul, Turkey
- Resting place: Merkezefendi Cemetery, Istanbul
- Education: Mimar Sinan University
- Notable work: Şeküre ve Kara (1999)
- Movement: Contemporary Turkish miniature
- Spouse: Hasan Rauf Aybey
- Family: Gürdal Duyar (brother)

Neşe Aybey (née Duyar; 2 March 1930 – 4 January 2015), also written Neş'e Aybey, was a Turkish painter, miniaturist and academic in the field of miniature art, one of the Traditional Turkish Arts and part of the Ottoman Book Arts. She was the older sister of sculptor Gürdal Duyar.

== Biography ==
Neşe Aybey was born as Neşe Duyar on 2 March 1930 as the second child of Fikri Duyar and Nezahat Duyar (née Erişkin). She was the older sister of sculptor Gürdal Duyar (1935–2004) and younger sister of Erdal Duyar (1927–1975). She was married to Hasan Rauf Aybey (1921–2005), an internist-medical doctor and poet.

She graduated from the Academy of Fine Arts in Istanbul, where she was a student of Hüseyin Tahirzade Behzat in the 1940s, majoring dually in miniature and tezhip. She became a professional painter, miniaturist, and also authored Turkish Miniature art in the 20th Century (1979). Upon the establishment of the Chair of Traditional Turkish Crafts in 1976 at the Academy of Fine Arts and the re-establishment of the Traditional Turkish Arts department, which had been shut down in the political climate of the 1960 coup, she became a teacher of miniature at the academy. She has also taught miniature at other places such as the Basın Müzesi as well as at special courses at Atelye Gamsız for those preparing to enter the Mimar Sinan University entrance examinations, along with her brother Gürdal who specialised in sculpture and also Leylâ Gamsız, Mahmut Cuda, Avni Arbaş, Nevin Çokay, Güler Diler, Mesut Üldaş and Edis Tezel.

One of her original exhibitions (Note: Original Exhibition in this context means an exhibition of works that are originally imagined by her as opposed to works that are based on existing historical Ottoman, Persian, Indian or other miniatures which are common for miniature artists and academics studying miniature to re-make.) of paintings and miniatures was in 1999. Among this exhibitions miniatures and paintings was Şeküre ve Kara (1999) which was inspired by Orhan Pamuks book titled My Name Is Red. The exhibition was at Galeri 3K, alongside a painting exhibition by Nazan Akpınar, who was her friend. Among her paintings that took part in the exhibition I-You-They: A Century of Artist Women (2021–2022) at Meşher, was her painting Manolyalı Kız, which was used on the banner of the exhibition. It is made from Gouache on paper. Also a 1957 pencil drawing on tracing paper was in the exhibit. In her artwork she used traditional motifs, patterns and lines. She has also sketched carpet motifs.

She died on 4 January 2015. Her funeral was two days later on 6 January at the Merkez Efendi Mosque, and she was laid to rest at the Merkezefendi Cemetery.

== Publications ==
- Aybey, Neşe (May 1979). "XX Yuzyilda Türk Minyatur Sanatı" [The Art of the TURKISH MINIATURE in the 20th Century]. Sanat Dünyamız (Archived Is Missing Page 43) (in Turkish). Vol. 6, no. 16. Yapi Kredi Publications. pp. 37–43. hdl:11498/40180.

== Known exhibitions ==
- Fine Arts Union-Painters Society 67. Istanbul Mixed Exhibition, Tunnel Anadolu Bank Art Gallery Beyoğlu, (23 January – 9 February) 1985
- Resimlerle Yaşayanlar, Alarko Sanat Galerisi, (−23 December) 1988
- Neşe Aybey:Özgün Minyatür ve Resim Sergisi [Neşe Aybeys original miniature and painting exhibition], Galeri 3K, (3 November – 7 December) 1999
- 90th Anniversary of the Ottoman Painters Society, Istanbul Military Museum, (23 December 1999 – 10 January 2000) 1999–2000
- Fine Arts Union Exhibition, Taksim Pera Art Gallery, (3 – 24 October) 2004
- Fine Arts Union-Painters Society 96th Anniversary Spring Exhibition, Istanbul Metropolitan Municipality-Taksim Art Gallery, (12 – 25 April) 2005
- Fine Arts Union-Painters Society, Ataturk Cultural Center, (13 – 28 September) 2006
- Fine Arts Union-Painters Society 99th Anniversary Exhibition, Istanbul Metropolitan Municipality-Taksim Art Gallery, 2008
- Ben-Sen-Onlar: Sanatçı Kadınların Yüzyılı [I-You-They: A Century of Artist Women], Meşher, (9 October 2021 – 29 May 2022) 2021–2022
