= Maide Arel =

Turkish-born Armenian painter (1907–1997)

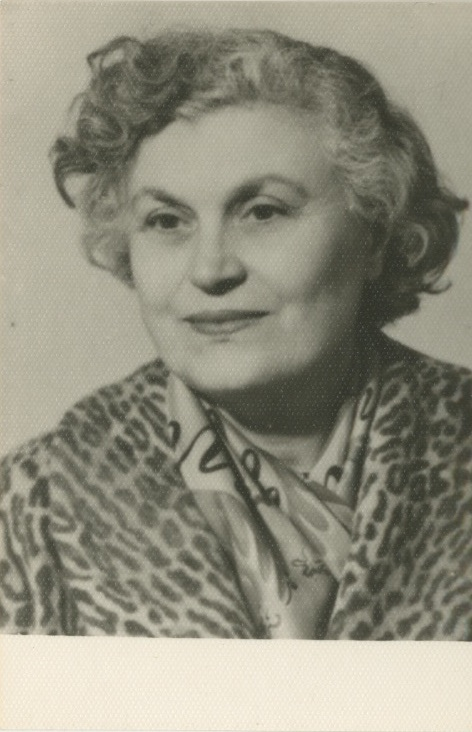
- Born: Mayde Feruhhan; 1907; Istanbul, Turkey
- Died: 9 February 1997 (aged 89–90); Istanbul, Turkey
- Other names: Maide Feruhhan, Mayde Arel
- Education: Mimar Sinan Fine Arts University
- Known for: painting
- Spouse: Şemsi Arel (1935–1982)

Maide Arel (1907–1997), also known as Mayde Feruhhan, was a Turkish-born Armenian painter. She is known for her work is abstract and stylized figures, similar to Cubism, often in dull colors.

== About ==
She was born as Mayde Feruhhan in 1907 in Istanbul, Turkey. She was the granddaughter of artist and designer Simon Dadyan and a descendant of Nazik Balyan and the Balyan family of architects.

Arel studied at Mimar Sinan Fine Arts University (formally known as İstanbul Devlet Güzel Sanatlar Akademisi) and graduated in 1935. Arel studied with Nazmi Ziya Güran, Mehmet Ruhi Arel, and Hikmet Onat. She married painter Şemsi Arel in 1935, the son of her painting professor Mehmet Ruhi Arel.

Between 1945 until 1950, she lived in Paris and studied in workshops with André Lhote, Fernand Léger, and Jean Metzinger. During her early career, her first period of paintings were primarily landscapes, and her work changed to abstraction after her return to Europe.

She died on 9 February 1997, and is buried in Istanbul, Turkey.
