= Hossein Taherzadeh Behzad =

Iranian painter

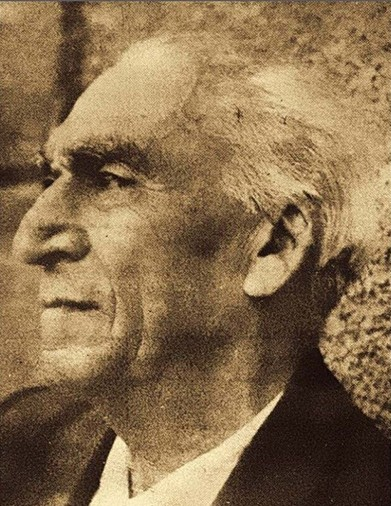
Photo of Hossein Taherzadeh Behzad

Hossein Taherzadeh Behzad (Persian: حسین طاهرزاده بهزاد; 1889–1962) was an Iranian miniaturist painter, calligrapher, educator, and carpet designer. He is considered one of the most important miniature artists of Iran, and has produced approximately 400 articles and artworks. In the present day his miniatures and carpet designs receive a great amount of attention.

== Biography ==
Tahirzade Behzad was born in 1889 in Tabriz, Qajar Iran. He received his training in painting at academies in Istanbul (now Mimar Sinan Fine Arts University) and Tbilisi (now Tbilisi State Academy of Arts), after which he returned to Iran.

He is credited with the development of an Iranian heroic national style to decorate the palaces of Reza Shah in collaboration with a team that consisted of craftsmen and architects. He created and/or directed the creation of these large scale wall murals which also lends credit to him as developing Pahlavi modernity. A section of the Negarestan Garden Palace was turned into a museum under the supervision of Behzad in 1930.

Behzad taught miniature painting and calligraphy at the State Academy of Fine Arts, Istanbul from 1947. Among his students at the academy were Neşe Aybey and others. He was honored with the nickname Müzeyyenü'l Sultan. In 2015 an exhibition in Tehran displayed the works of Behzad and the tools that he used in his work.

== Sources ==
- Artun, Deniz; Çetin, Şeyda; Satıcı, Ebru Esra (2021). I-You-They: A Century of Artist Women. Translated by Şengözer, Aykut (1 ed.). Vehbi Koç Foundation. ISBN 978-605-9606-26-4.
- Diba, Layla S. (2013). "The Formation of Modern Iranian Art: From Kamal-al-Molk to Zenderoudi". In Daftari, Fereshteh; S. Diba, Layla (eds.). Iran Modern. Asia Society Museum. pp. 42–65 – via Academia.edu.
- Diba, Layla S. (2025). "Border Crossings: Iranian Artists in Tsarist Russia and Georgia". In Amanat, Abbas; Gledhill, Kevin; Nejad, Kayhan A. (eds.). The Caspian World: Connections and Contentions at a Modern Eurasian Crossroads. Cornell University Press. pp. 247–268. ISBN 978-1501781292.
