= Tiraje Dikmen =

Turkish painter (1923–2014)

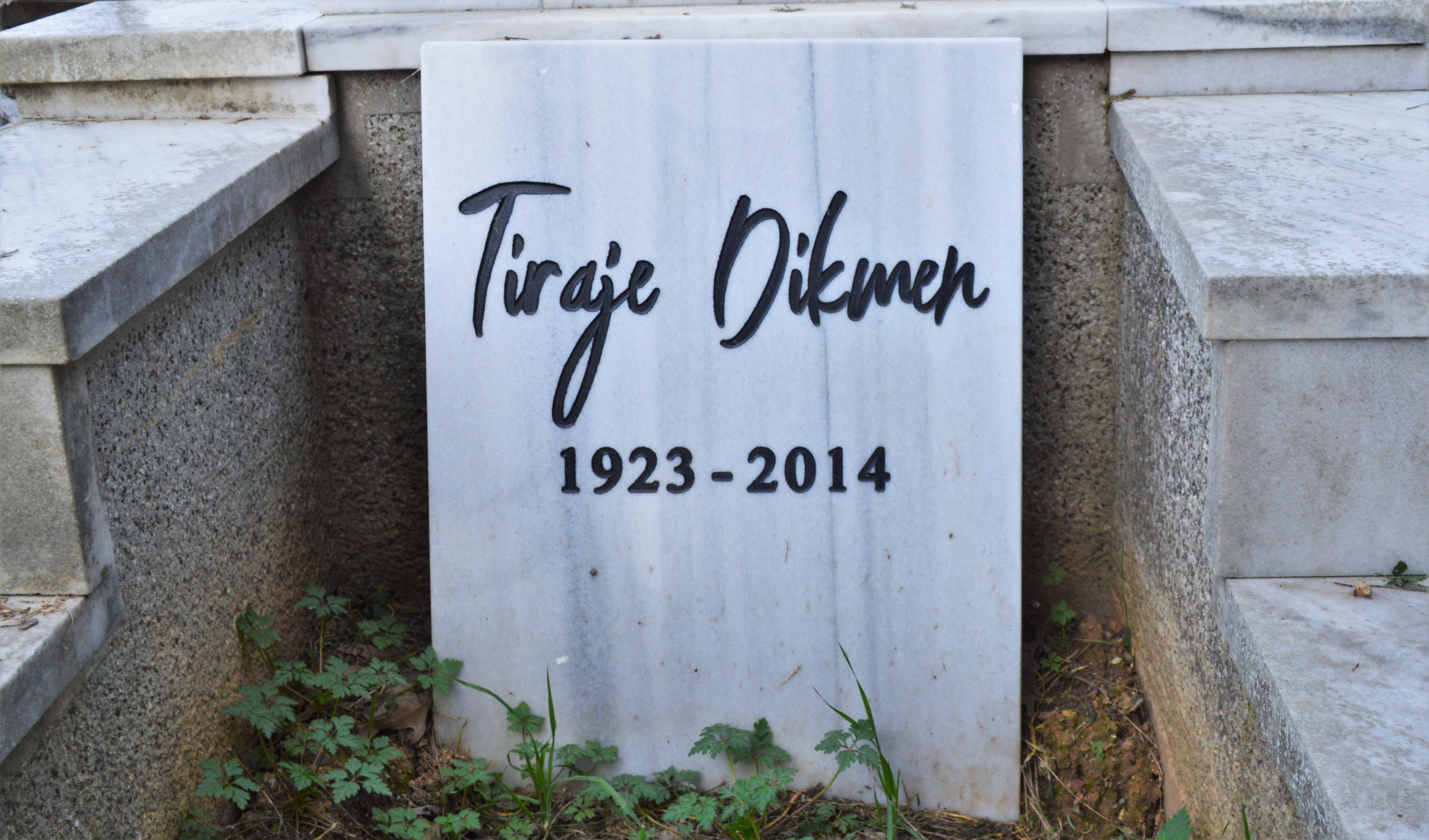
- Tiraje Dikmen's gravestone
- Born: Fatma Tiraje Dikmen; 21 September 1923; Istanbul, Ottoman Empire
- Died: 1 September 2014 (aged 90); Istanbul, Turkey
- Resting place: Tepeköy Cemetery
- Education: Mimar Sinan Fine Arts University
- Known for: Painting
- Movement: Surrealism

Fatma Tiraje Dikmen (21 September 1923 – 1 September 2014) was a Turkish painter of Georgian origin, known for her surrealist style and for her studies of color.

== Biography ==
Fatma Tiraje Dikmen was born in Istanbul on 21 September 1923 (although she later claimed she was born in 1925), at her family's villa in Büyükada. She was the daughter of Cafer Fahri Dikmen, originally from Batumi and Turkey's first microbiologist, and his wife Emine Halide Hanim. She had an older sister, Şükriye Dikmen, also a painter, and was the niece of Ali Dikmen, a politician member of Meclis-i Mebusan who took part in the Grand National Assembly.

Like her sister, she attended English and French schools, graduating in 1940 at Işık High School, and she approached painting because her family frequented artists such as Namık İsmail and Feyhaman Duran.

She initially studied economics at Istanbul University, graduating in 1946, and then took her doctorate in 1949 with a thesis entitled İstanbul'da Kadın İşçilerin Çalışma Koşulları ("Working conditions of women workers in Istanbul").

Parallel to her studies, between 1943 and 1949, encouraged by her family, she attended the State Academy of Fine Arts as an external student, following the courses of Léopold Lévy.

In 1949 she won a scholarship to study law and economics in Paris. She continued her lessons with Lévy because he returned to Paris in the same year. In this period she devoted herself to the study of the figure, carrying out internships at the Louvre Museum and the Museum of Popular Arts and Traditions and making several friends, including Max Ernst, Yves Bonnefoy, Man Ray, Jacques Herold.

In 1956 she organized her first exhibition, where she exhibited drawings and sketches. Max Ernst wrote a positive review of the exhibition and bought one of her drawings.

Later, Tiraje turned to the study of color and began to experiment with the surrealist style. At her second exhibition, at the Galerie Edouard Loeb, she exhibited oil paintings. In 1961 she exhibited in Istanbul, at the State Academy, in an exhibition entitled "Turkish artists in Paris", and in 1963 in Paris, at the Museum of Modern Art, in the exhibition "Contemporary Turkish Art".

In 1964 she exhibited in Paris at the Charpentier, in what is considered the most important Surrealist exhibition in history, and at the Galerie Birtschansky.

In 1966 Lévy died naming her his sole heir, leaving her his workshop and her paintings. Tiraje took charge of the laboratory for two years, dealing with the creation of the Lévy archive, but in 1968, deeply affected by the May 68, she decided to return to Istanbul, returning to live in the family villa in Büyükada.

In 1970 she organized her first solo exhibition in Istanbul. However, she never forgot Paris: she continued to run the Levy laboratory remotely and in her diary kept a note with her written "I never left Paris". In 1985 she organized her fourth solo exhibition, entitled "Memory of Times" at Ankara Gallery Nev, but later she moved away from exhibitions, dedicating herself to experimental works, mostly on the theme of migration.

Fatma Tiraje Dikmen died on September 1, 2014. She was buried in Tepeköy Cemetery in Büyükada.
