= Adnan Coker =

Turkish artist (1927–2022)

Adnan Coker (Turkish: Adnan Çoker; 20 October 1927 – 22 August 2022) was a Turkish abstract artist.

Coker was born in Süleymaniye in Istanbul on 20 October 1927. He graduated from the Academy of Fine Arts in Istanbul in 1951, and won the European Concourt Prize in 1955. He went on to study in Paris on a scholarship from the Turkish state. In Paris, he worked at the studios of André Lhote, Henri Goetz, and Hayter, as well as at the Emilio Vedova Studio at the International Salzburg Summer Academy.

Coker died on 22 August 2022, at the age of 94.

== Career ==
Coker was an instructor at the İstasyon Academy of Fine Arts from 1960 to 1995. He performed demonstrations of painting with music from 1961 to 1966. He has had more than 20 solo exhibitions, over 20 group exhibitions, and has been the recipient of eight national and two international awards.
