= Salvatore Valeri =

Italian painter

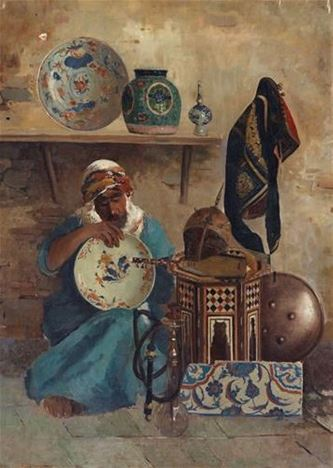
Antiques Dealer

Salvatore Valeri (1856 in Nettuno – 30 December 1946 in Nettuno) was an Italian painter who spent much of his career as an art teacher in Turkey.

== Biography ==
He studied painting at the Accademia di San Luca in Rome. In 1882, he moved from Italy to the Şişli district in Istanbul, where he opened a small workshop. Not long after, the School of Fine Arts and Crafts opened and, on the recommendation of the British Ambassador, Lord Dufferin, he was able to obtain a position as a teacher of oil painting. He would remain there until 1915. The school later became part of the Mimar Sinan Fine Arts University.

He exhibited at the Istanbul Salons of 1901, 1902 and 1903. His students included the sons of Sultan Abdul Hamid II and he was officially granted the title "Teacher of the Princes". He was especially well known for his portraits.

He married an Armenian woman; Maria Lekegian, the sister of one of his students, Gabriel Lekegian. They had a daughter named Italia. He was suspended from teaching during the Italo-Turkish War; returning upon its completion. Three years later, however, he and his family were forced to flee, due to the beginning of the Armenian genocide. He returned to his hometown, opened a private art school, and operated it until his death in 1946.
