= Yapı Kredi Yayınları =

Publishing house in Turkey

Yapi Kredi Publications
- Native name: Yapı Kredi Yayınları
- Industry: Publishing
- Founded: 1992; 34 years ago
- Headquarters: Istanbul, Turkey
- Parent: Yapı Kredi

Yapı Kredi Yayınları (also YKY or Yapi Kredi Publications) is a publishing house based in Istanbul, Turkey, and founded in 1992.

As of 2013 it has published 4000 titles in philosophy, literature, the arts, and children's books. It has printed more than 2 million copies in 2013. In January 2018, the publishing house released its 5000th book, titled Nâzım’ın Cep Defterlerinde Kavga, Aşk ve Şiir Notları (1937–1942), showcasing notes on conflict, love, and poetry found in Nâzım's pocket notebooks from 1937 to 1942.

It is a member of the Turkish Publishers Association.
