= Mimar Sinan Fine Arts University =

Turkish public university located in Istanbul

- Mimar Sinan Güzel Sanatlar Üniversitesi
- Type: Public
- Established: 1 January 1882; 144 years ago
- Founder: Osman Hamdi Bey
- Rector: Handan İnci Elçi
- Administrative staff: 500
- Undergraduates: 6,942
- Location: Istanbul, Turkey; 41.03°N 28.9892°E
- Campus: Urban
- Website: msgsu.edu.tr Building details
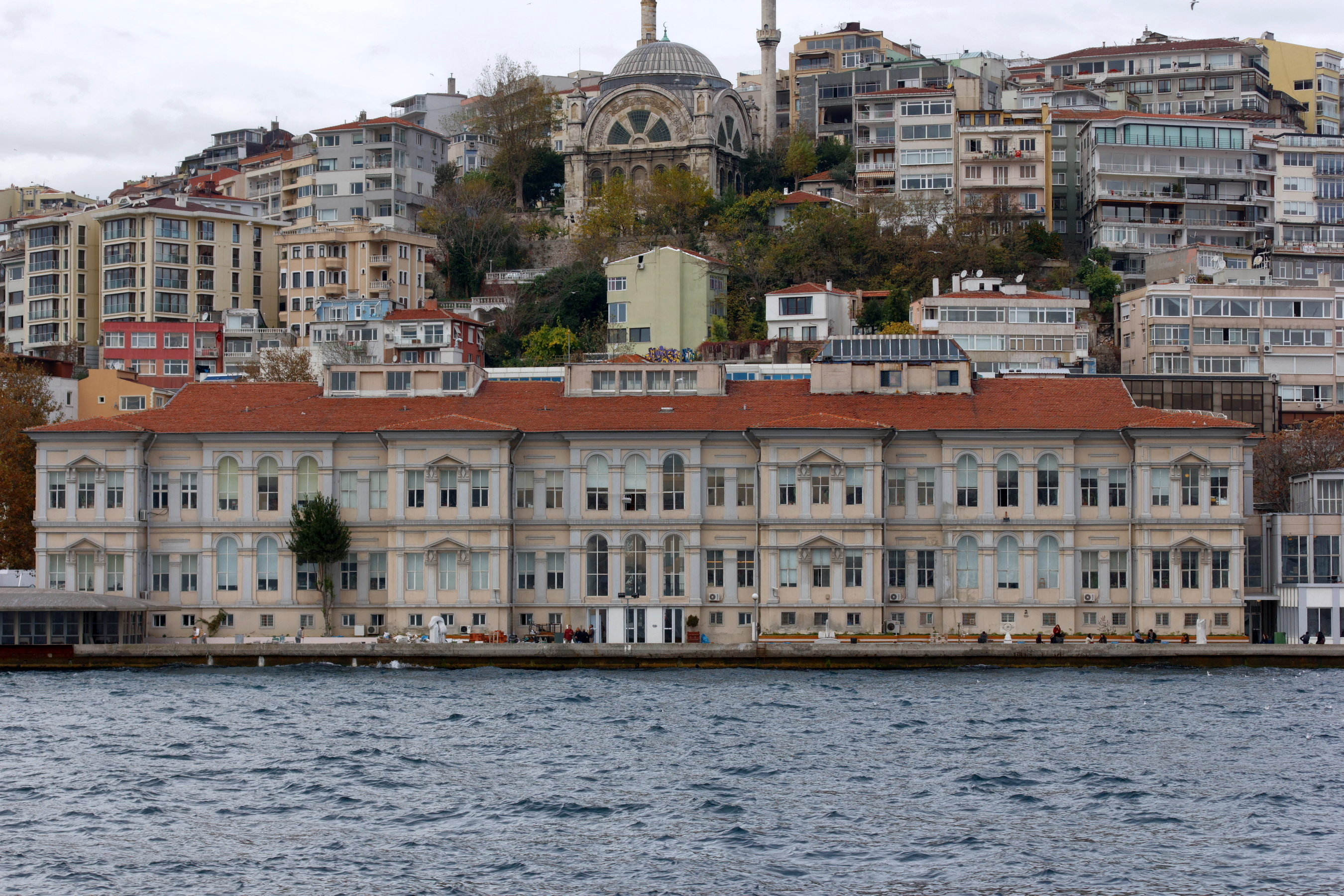
- The University as seen from across the Bosphorus

Mimar Sinan Fine Arts University (Turkish: Mimar Sinan Güzel Sanatlar Üniversitesi, or MSGSÜ) is a public art university in Istanbul, Turkey. The university's campus is located in the Fındıklı, Beyoğlu. The university was established in 1882 under the leadership of Osman Hamdi Bey.

== History ==
On January 1, 1882, the Ottoman Turkish painter, art historian, archaeologist, and museum curator Osman Hamdi Bey established the Imperial College of Fine Arts (Turkish: Sanayi-i Nefise Mekteb-i Âlisi, formally Mekteb-i Sanayi-i Nefise-i Şâhâne or Sanayi-i Nefise Mektebi), modeled after the Beaux-Arts de Paris. When it opened on March 2, 1883 with eight instructors and 20 students, the college was the Ottoman Empire's first educational institution for fine arts and architecture.

In 1914, the school became co-educational. In 1928, it was converted from a school to an academy, the first in Turkey, and its name was changed to the State Academy of the Fine Arts (Turkish: Devlet Güzel Sanatlar Akademisi). In 1969, it was renamed as the Istanbul State Academy of Fine Arts (Turkish: İstanbul Devlet Güzel Sanatlar Akademisi, or İDGSA), and gained administrative autonomy according to Law No. 1172 on Fine Arts Academies in Turkey.

On July 20, 1982, its status was changed again, and the academy became Mimar Sinan University (Turkish: Mimar Sinan Üniversitesi) in memory of the Ottoman chief-architect Mimar Sinan. Finally, in December 2003, the administration of the university changed its name to the Mimar Sinan Fine Arts University. Since 1982, the institution has been providing four-year educational programmes.

== Building ==
The buildings that house what is now the Mimar Sinan Fine Arts University were initially constructed in 1856 as the twin palaces of Münire Sultan and Cemile Sultan, the daughters of Sultan Abdülmecid. They subsequently housed the meetings of the Chamber of Deputies of the Ottoman Empire between 1910 and 1920.

== Basic Design Education Division ==
Following the Academy Reform and a student occupation in 1968, Basic Design Education (Turkish: Temel Sanat Eğitimi) was incorporated into the curriculum in 1969. The Basic Design Education Division was critical of the master-apprentice model and aimed to blur the distinction between handicrafts and fine arts. The co-founders of this division included Altan Gürman, Ercümend Kalmık, Ali Teoman Germaner, Erkal Güngören, Özer Kabaş, and Nuri Temizsoylu, who wanted to create a Bauhaus-inspired model to enable consistency and continuity in the education that first-year students received. This model aimed at encouraging students to explore, question and analyse different techniques, tools, and materials related to arts and design.

Following the 1980 coup d'état in Turkey, the administration and autonomy of universities changed, and Basic Design Education was removed from the curriculum in 1982. The Mimar Sinan Fine Arts High Schools in Istanbul and Ankara have no relation with Mimar Sinan Fine Arts University.

== Organisation ==
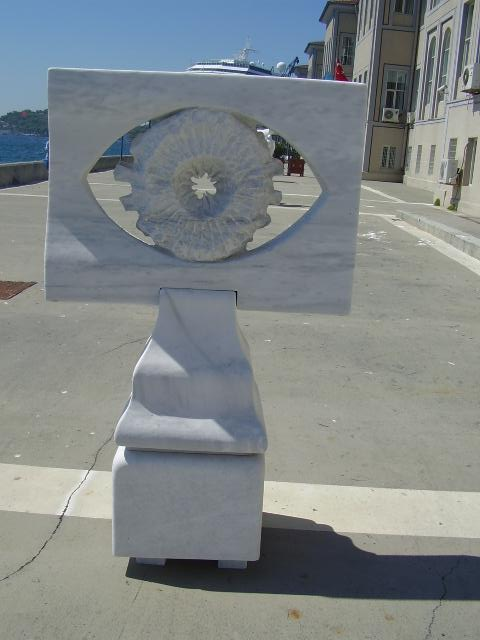
Eye in marble in grounds of university

- Faculty of Fine Arts: Photography, Traditional Turkish Handicrafts, Graphic Design, Sculpture, Painting, Stage Design and Stage Clothes, Ceramics Art and Glass Art, Cinema and TV, Textile Design and Fashion Design, Bookbinding, Tilework Restoration, Calligraphy, Rug and Old Textile Design, Restoration and Conservation of Art Works (Painting and Sculpture)
- Faculty of Architecture: Architecture, Urban Planning and Regional Planning, Industrial Design, Interior Architecture
- Istanbul State Conservatory: Music, Musicology, Performing Arts
- Vocational School: Textile Design, Architectural Restoration
- Faculty of Natural Sciences and Literature: Archeology, Pedagogy, Physics, Philosophy, Statistics, Mathematics, History of Art, Sociology, History, Turkish Literature
- Institute of Natural Sciences
- Institute of Social Sciences
- Institute of Fine Arts
- School of Informatics

== Notable people ==
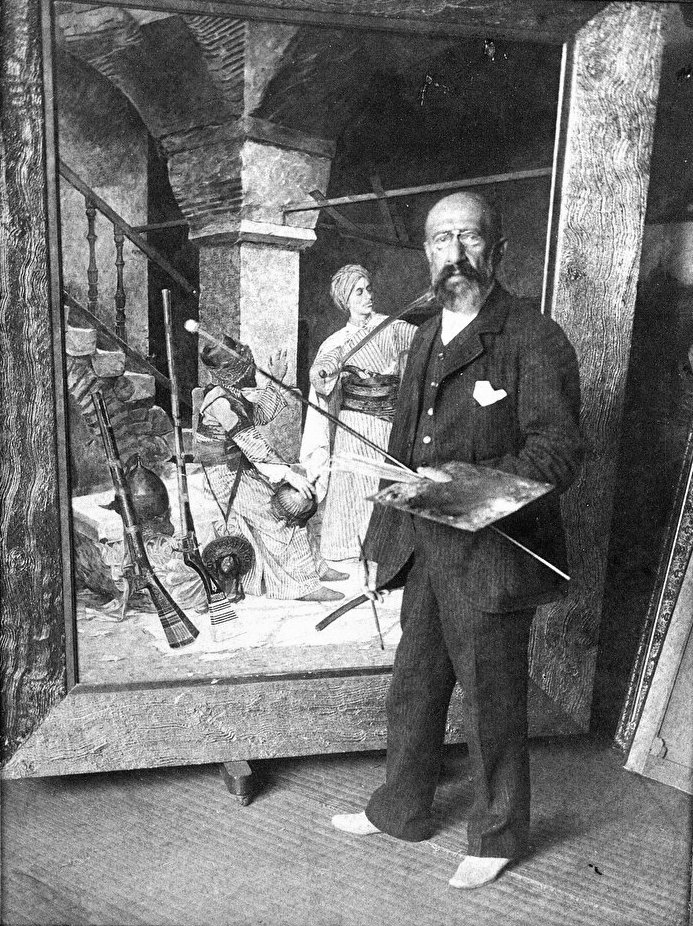
Osman Hamdi Bey

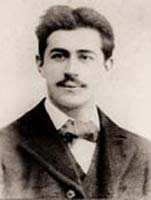
Vedat Tek

=== Notable faculty ===
- Osman Hamdi Bey — Painter, art historian and archaeologist
- Alexander Vallaury — French architect
- Salvatore Valeri — Italian painter
- Yervant Osgan — Ottoman Armenian sculptor
- İbrahim Çallı — Painter
- Filiz Ali — Pianist and musicologist
- Rudolf Belling — German sculptor
- Nuri Bilge Ceylan — Film director, screenwriter and photographer
- Adnan Coker — Painter
- Bedri Rahmi Eyüboğlu — Painter and poet
- Nazmi Ziya Güran — Painter
- Giulio Mongeri — Italian Levantine architect
- Vedat Tek — Turkish architect
- Bruno Taut — German architect
- Sedad Hakkı Eldem — Turkish architect
- Robert Vorhoelzer — German architect and city planner
- Ali Teoman Germaner — Sculptor
- Neşe Aybey — Miniaturist
- Hüseyin Tahirzade Behzat — Miniaturist

=== Notable alumni ===
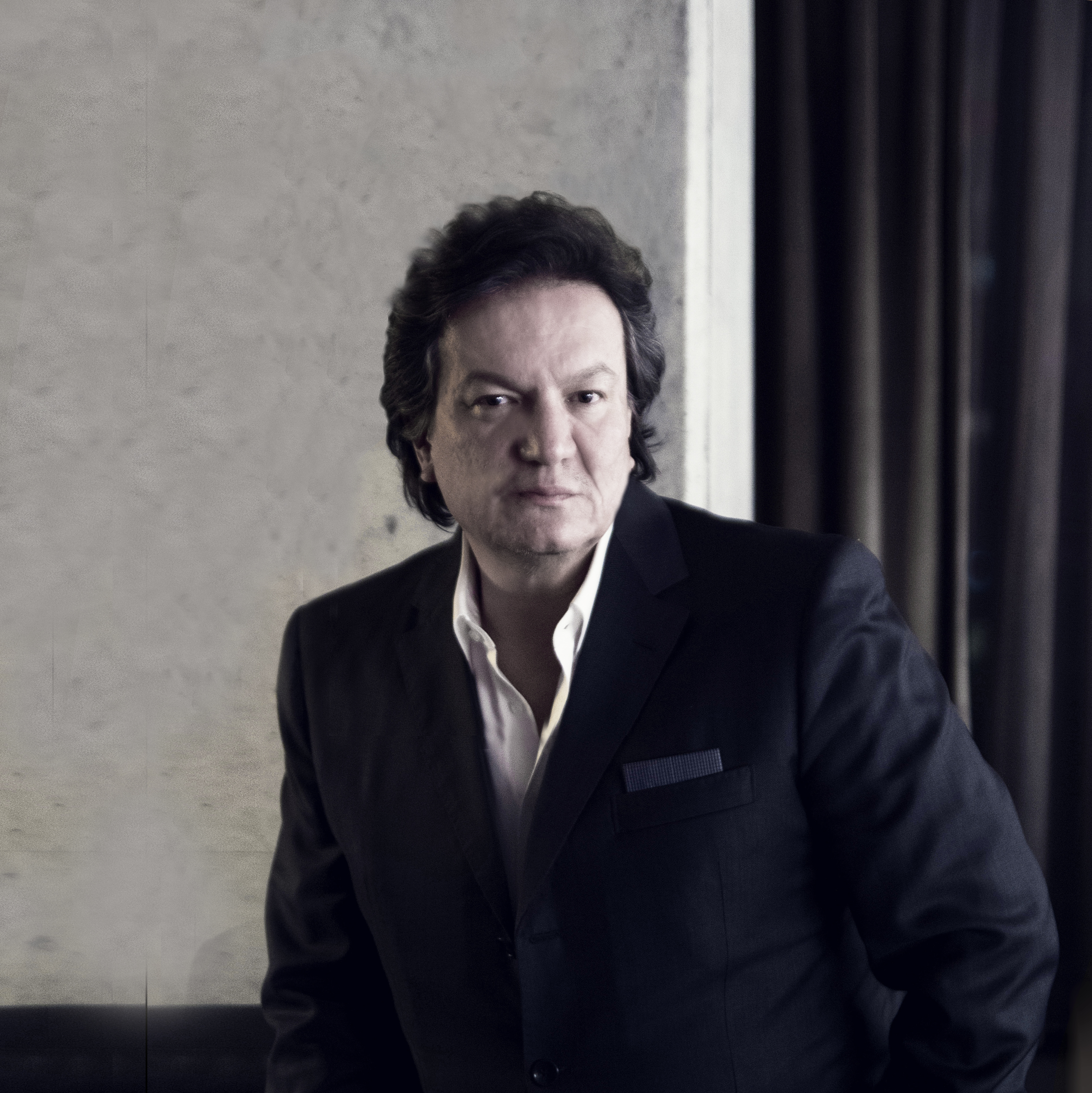
Emre Arolat

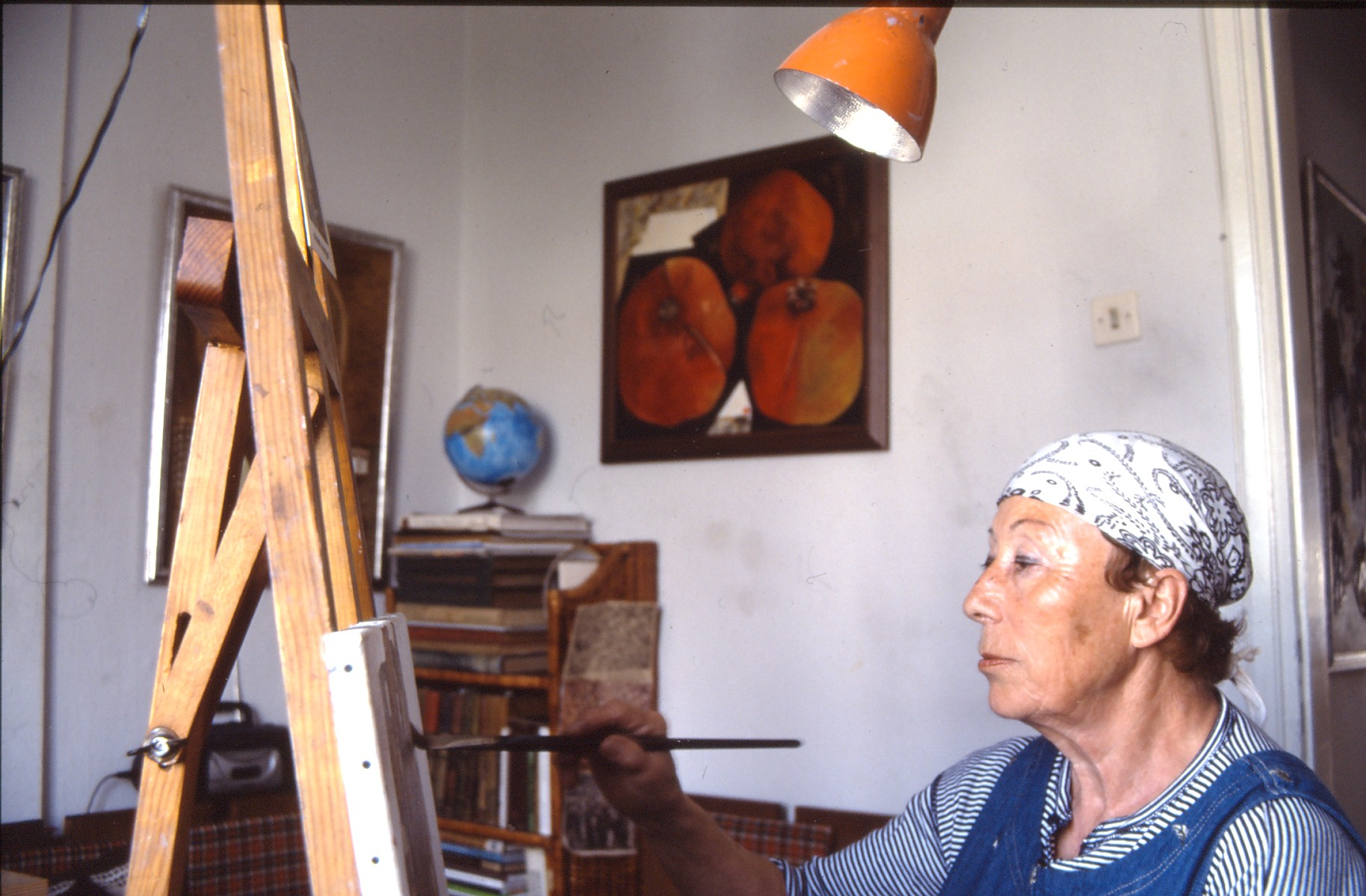
Nevin Çokay

- Sarp Akkaya — Actor
- Maide Arel — Armenian-Turkish painter, graduated in 1935
- Emre Arolat — Architect and professor
- Kutluğ Ataman — Film director
- Sinem Banna — Turkish-American sculptor
- Okan Bayülgen — Actor and TV personality
- Akbar Behkalam — German-Iranian painter and sculptor
- Burak Bilgili — Opera singer
- Sabiha Rüştü Bozcalı — Turkish visual artist and illustrator
- Erol Bulut — Turkish painter, graduate of the Painting Department and later professor of painting at Marmara University
- Tuba Büyüküstün — Actress and model
- Emel Cimcoz — Turkish painter and First lady of Turkey (1973-1980)
- Nevin Çokay — Painter
- Adnan Coker — Painter
- Tiraje Dikmen — Turkish painter
- Hande Erçel — Actress and model
- Halit Ergenç — Actor
- Yonca Evcimik — Pop singer
- Nazmi Ziya Güran — Painter
- Nejat İşler — Actor
- Nur Koçak — Artist
- Maya Kulenovic — Canadian painter (student from 1992 to 1995)
- Nazlı Deniz Kuruoğlu — Ballet dancer and Miss Turkey 1982
- Elif Naci — Painter
- Pınar Selek — Sociologist and human rights activist
- Erinç Seymen — Turkish artist
- Galip Tekin — Comic book artist

== See also ==
- National Palaces Painting Museum
- Istanbul Museum of Painting and Sculpture
- List of universities in Turkey
- Osman Hamdi Bey
- Mimar Sinan
