= List of contemporary Turkish poets =

This list includes the notable Turkish poets.

- Yahya Kemal Beyatlı (1884–1958)
- Ahmet Haşim (1885–1933)
- Faruk Nafiz Çamlıbel (1898–1973)
- Nazım Hikmet (1902–1963)
- Necip Fazıl Kısakürek (1904–1983)
- Hüseyin Nihâl Atsız (1905–1975)
- Sait Faik Abasıyanık (1906–1954)
- Asaf Hâlet Çelebi (1907–1958)
- Ahmet Muhip Dıranas (1908–1980)
- Cahit Sıtkı Tarancı (1910–1956)
- Rıfat Ilgaz (1911–1993)
- Orhan Veli Kanık (1914–1950)
- Oktay Rifat Horozcu (1914–1988)
- Fazıl Hüsnü Dağlarca (1915–2008)
- Baki Süha Ediboğlu (1915–1972)
- Melih Cevdet Anday (1915–2002)
- Behçet Necatigil (1916–1979)
- Cahit Külebi (1917–1997)
- İlhan Berk (1918–2008)
- Özdemir Asaf (1923–1981)
- Attila İlhan (1925–2005)
- Ümit Yaşar Oğuzcan (1926–1984)
- Asım Bezirci (1927–1993)
- Ahmet Arif, (1927–1991)
- Edip Cansever (1928–1986)
- Ece Ayhan (1931–2002)
- Cemal Süreya (1931–1990)
- Sezai Karakoç (born 1933)
- Gülten Akın (1933–2015)
- Onat Kutlar (1936–1995)
- Cahit Zarifoğlu (1940–1987)
- İsmet Özel (born 1944)
- Ahmet Emin Atasoy (born 1944)
- Ali F. Bilir (born 1945)
- Behçet Aysan (1949–1993)
- Enis Batur (born 1952)
- Lale Müldür (born 1956)
- Haydar Ergülen (born 1956)
- Seyhan Erözçelik (1962–2011)
- Ahmet Yalçınkaya (born 1963)
- Birhan Keskin (born 1963)
- Seyhan Kurt (born 1971)
- Kenan Yücel (born 1974)
- Nurduran Duman (born 1974)
- İbrahim Halil Baran (born 1981)
- Süreyya Aylin Antmen (born 1981)

== See also ==
- List of Ottoman poets
