= List of Turkish writers =

This is a list of Turkish writers who are Ottoman or Turkish nationals and who write in Turkish language.

== A ==
- İhsan Oktay Anar, novelist, story writer (born 1960)
- Sait Faik Abasıyanık, short story writer, novelist, poet (1906–1954)
- Halide Edib Adıvar, novelist, scholar politician (1884–1964)
- Agah Efendi, journalist (1832–1885)
- Adalet Ağaoğlu, novelist and playwright (1929–2020)
- Süreyya Ağaoğlu, lawyer (1903–1989)
- Zeynep Ahunbay, scholar (born 1946)
- Munejjim-bashi Ahmed Dede, courtier, poet, historian (died 1702)
- Ahmed Vefik Pasha, translator, playwright, statesman, dictionary writer, diplomat of Greek origin (1823–1891)
- Hikmet Temel Akarsu, novelist, short story writer, playwright, satirist (born 1960)
- Gülten Akın, poet (1933–2015)
- Alev Alatlı, economist, philosopher, novelist, columnist (born 1944)
- Sabahattin Ali, novelist, short story writer, poet, journalist (1903–1948)
- Melih Cevdet Anday, poet (1915–2002)
- Nezihe Araz, playwright, journalist, poet (1920–2009)
- Duygu Asena, journalist, women's rights activist (1946–2006)
- Nurullah Ataç, writer, poet and literary critic (1898–1957)
- Meltem Arıkan, novelist and playwright (born 1968)
- Yusuf Atılgan, novelist, short story writer and playwright (1921–1989)
- Doğan Avcıoğlu, journalist, politician (1926–1983)
- Şevket Süreyya Aydemir, historian, economist (1897–1976)
- Behçet Aysan, physician and poet (1949-1993)
- Samiha Ayverdi, Sufi mystic (1905–1993)

== B ==
- Vecihi Başarın, historian (born 1947)
- Pelin Batu, actress, poet, historian (born 1978)
- Enis Batur, poet, essayist, novelist, editor (born 1952)
- Ataol Behramoğlu, poet, essayist, translator (born 1942)
- Nazan Bekiroğlu, novelist (born 1957)
- İlhan Berk, poet (1918–2008)
- Asım Bezirci, critic, writer and poet (1927-1993)
- Aydın Boysan, architect, scholar, essayist (born 1921)
- Rıza Tevfik Bölükbaşı, philosopher, poet, politician (1869–1949)
- Sevim Burak, playwright, poet (1931–1983)
- Coşkun Büktel, playwright, screenwriter, novelist, critic (born 1950)

== C ==
- Edip Cansever, poet (1928–1986)
- Abdullah Cevdet, poet, philosopher, translator (1869–1932)

== Ç ==
- Ece Ayhan Çağlar (1931–2002), poet
- Semih Çalışkan (born 1986), novelist

== D ==
- Fazıl Hüsnü Dağlarca, poet (1914–2008)
- Radi Dikici, historian (1937-2021)
- Ahmet Muhip Dıranas, poet and playwright (1909–1980)
- Sulhi Dölek, satirist (1948–2005)

== E ==
- Erzurumlu Emrah (1775–1854), folk poet
- Ercüment Ekrem Talu (1886–1956), humorist, journalist
- Refik Erduran (1928–2017), playwright, journalist and writer
- Mehmet Akif Ersoy (1873–1936), poet, scholar, writer of the Turkish National Anthem

== F ==
- Fitnat Hanım (died in 1780), poet

== G ==
- Müjdat Gezen, theatre actor and writer (born 1943)
- Ziya Gökalp, sociologist, poet, political activist (1876–1924)
- Reşat Nuri Güntekin, novelist, storywriter and playwright (1889–1956)
- Osman Necmi Gürmen, novelist
- Hüseyin Rahmi Gürpınar, writer and politician (1864–1944)
- Deniz Goran, novelist (born 1974)

== H ==
- Kınalızâde Hasan Çelebi, poet and bibliographer (1546–1604)
- Ahmet Haşim, poet (1884–1933)
- Nazım Hikmet, poet, playwright, novelist, screenwriter, director (1902–1963)
- Abdülhak Şinasi Hisar, novelist and biographer (1887–1963)
- Oktay Rıfat Horozcu, poet and playwright (1914–1988)

== I ==
- Rıfat Ilgaz, teacher, writer and poet (1911–1993)

== İ ==
- Attilâ İlhan, poet, novelist, journalist, essayist, reviewer (1925–2005)

== K ==
- Orhan Veli Kanık, poet (1914–1950)
- Ceyhun Atuf Kansu, poet, author (1919–1978)
- Yakup Kadri Karaosmanoğlu, novelist, journalist, poet (1889–1974)
- Orhan Kemal, novelist (1914–1970)
- Yahya Kemal, poet, author, politician and diplomat (1884–1958)
- Yaşar Kemal, writer and human rights activist (1923–2015)
- Necip Fazıl Kısakürek, poet, novelist, playwright (1904–1983)
- Mehmet Fuat Köprülü, historian (1890–1966)
- Ayşe Kulin, novelist and columnist (born 1941)
- Pınar Kür, novelist, dramatist, and translator (1943–2025)

== M ==
- Aşık Mahzuni Şerif, folk musician, ashik, poet, composer (1940–2002)
- Murathan Mungan, novelist, short story writer, poet, playwright (born 1955)
- Emre Miyasoğlu, essayist and dramatist (born 1981)

== N ==
- Aziz Nesin, novelist, humorist, playwright, poet, short story writer (1915–1995)
- Nedîm, poet (1681–1730)
- Nef'i, poet and satirist (1572–1635)
- Nergisî, prose writer (c. 1580–1635)

== O ==
- Celil Oker, crime fiction writer (1952–2019)
- İsmet Özel, poet (born 1944)

== P ==
- Orhan Pamuk, novelist, screenwriter, scholar, Nobel laureate in Literature (born 1952)
- Pir Sultan Abdal, poet (c. 1480–1550)

== S ==
- Peyami Safa, journalist, columnist and novelist (1899–1961)

== Ş ==
- Elif Şafak, author, columnist, speaker and academic (born 1971)

== T ==
- Kemal Tahir, novelist and intellectual (1910–1973)
- Haldun Taner, playwright and short story writer (1915–1986)
- Ercüment Ekrem Talu, writer, humorist and a journalist (1886–1956)
- Ahmet Hamdi Tanpınar, poet, novelist, literary scholar and essayist (1901–1962)
- Fatma Aliye Topuz, novelist, columnist, essayist (1862–1936)

== V ==
- Vedat Türkali, screenwriter, playwright, novelist (1919–2016)

== Y ==
- Yunus Emre, poet and mystic (1238–1320)
- Mehmet Emin Yurdakul, poet (1869–1944)

== Z ==
- Halide Nusret Zorlutuna, poet and novelist (1901–1984)

== See also ==
- List of Turkish short story writers
- List of Turkish women writers
