= Poetry of Turkey =

Turkish poetry

There were a number of poetic trends in the poetry of Turkey in the early years of the Republic of Turkey. Authors such as Ahmed Haşim and Yahya Kemal Beyatlı (1884–1958) continued to write important formal verse whose language was, to a great extent, a continuation of the late Ottoman tradition.

By far the majority of the poetry of the time, however, was in the tradition of the folk-inspired "syllabist" movement (Beş Hececiler), which had emerged from the National Literature movement and which tended to express patriotic themes couched in the syllabic meter associated with Turkish folk poetry.

The first radical step away from this trend was taken by Nazım Hikmet Ran, who—during his time as a student in the Soviet Union from 1921 to 1924 was exposed to the modernist poetry of Vladimir Mayakovsky and others, which inspired him to start writing verse in a less formal style. At this time, he wrote the poem "Açların Gözbebekleri" ("Pupils of the Hungry"), which introduced free verse into the Turkish language for, essentially, the first time.

Much of Nazım Hikmet's poetry subsequent to this breakthrough would continue to be written in free verse, though his work exerted little influence for some time due largely to censorship of his work owing to his Communist political stance, which also led to his spending several years in prison. Over time, in such books as Simavne Kadısı Oğlu Şeyh Bedreddin Destanı ("The Epic of Shaykh Bedreddin, Son of Judge Simavne", 1936) and Memleketimden İnsan Manzaraları ("Human Landscapes from My Country", 1939), he developed a voice simultaneously proclamatory and subtle.

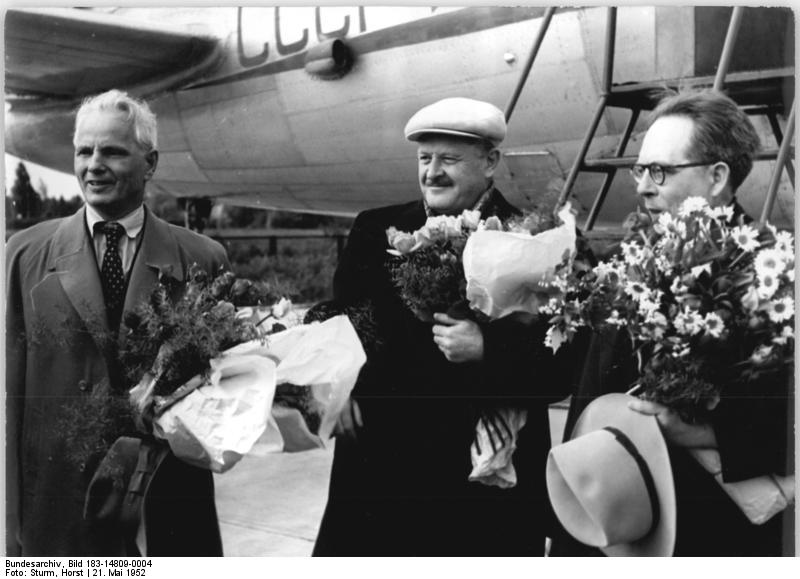
Turkish poet Nâzım Hikmet Ran (1902-1963)

Another revolution in Turkish poetry came about in 1941 with the publication of a small volume of verse preceded by an essay and entitled Garip ("Strange"). The authors were Orhan Veli Kanık (1914–1950), Melih Cevdet Anday (1915–2002), and Oktay Rifat (1914–1988). Explicitly opposing themselves to everything that had gone in poetry before, they sought instead to create a popular art, "to explore the people's tastes, to determine them, and to make them reign supreme over art". To this end, and inspired in part by contemporary French poets like Jacques Prévert, they employed not only a variant of the free verse introduced by Nâzım Hikmet, but also highly colloquial language, and wrote primarily about mundane daily subjects and the ordinary man on the street. The reaction was immediate and polarized: most of the academic establishment and older poets vilified them, while much of the Turkish population embraced them wholeheartedly. Though the movement itself lasted only ten years—until Orhan Veli's death in 1950, after which Melih Cevdet Anday and Oktay Rifat moved on to other styles—its effect on Turkish poetry continues to be felt today.

Just as the Garip movement was a reaction against earlier poetry, so—in the 1950s and afterwards—was there a reaction against the Garip movement. The poets of this movement, soon known as İkinci Yeni ("Second New"), opposed themselves to the social aspects prevalent in the poetry of Nâzım Hikmet and the Garip poets, and instead—partly inspired by the disruption of language in such Western movements as Dada and Surrealism—sought to create a more abstract poetry through the use of jarring and unexpected language, complex images, and the association of ideas. To some extent, the movement can be seen as bearing some of the characteristics of postmodern literature. The best-known poets writing in the "Second New" vein were Turgut Uyar (1927–1985), Edip Cansever (1928–1986), Cemal Süreya (1931–1990), Ece Ayhan (1931–2002), Sezai Karakoç (1933- ) and İlhan Berk (1918–2008).

Outside the Garip and "Second New" movements also, a number of significant poets have flourished, such as Fazıl Hüsnü Dağlarca (1914–2008), who wrote poems dealing with fundamental concepts like life, death, God, time, and the cosmos; Behçet Necatigil (1916–1979), whose somewhat allegorical poems explore the significance of middle-class daily life; Can Yücel (1926–1999), who—in addition to his own highly colloquial and varied poetry—was also a translator into Turkish of a variety of world literature.

== National Literature (1911–1923) ==
- Mehmet Emin Yurdakul (1869–1944)
- Ziya Gökalp (1876–1924)
- Omer Seyfettin (1884–1920)
- Refik Halit Karay (1888–1965)
- Halide Edib Adıvar (1884–1964)
- Resat Nuri Guntekin (1889–1956)
- Mehmet Fuat Köprülü (1890–1966)
- Yakup Kadri Karaosmanoglu (1889–1974)

== Garip Movement ==
- Orhan Veli Kanik (1914–1950)
- Oktay Rıfat Horozcu (1914–1988)
- Melih Cevdet Anday (1915–2002)

== Free verse ==
- Nazim Hikmet (1901–1963)

== Second New Movement ==
- Cemal Süreya (1931–1990)
- Ilhan Berk (1918–2008)
- Turgut Uyar (1927–1985)
- Edip Cansever (1928–1986)
- Ece Ayhan Çağlar (1931–2002)
- Sezai Karakoç (1933–2021)

== Folk ==
- Faruk Nafiz Çamlıbel, poet (1898–1973)

== Others ==
- Neyzen Tevfik, poet (1879–1953)
- Ahmet Haşim, poet (1884–1933)
- Yahya Kemal Beyatlı, poet (1884–1958)
- Abdülhak Şinasi Hisar, poet and novelist (1888–1963)
- Necip Fazıl Kısakürek, poet and essayist (1905–1983)
- Ahmet Muhip Dıranas, poet (1909–1980)
- Cahit Sıtkı Tarancı, poet (1910–1956)
- Fazıl Hüsnü Dağlarca, poet (1914–2008)
- Can Yücel, poet (1926–1999)
- Attila İlhan, poet (1925–2005)
- Ismet Özel, poet (1944– )
- Sabit İnce, poet (1954– )
- Hakan Sürsal, poet and novelist (1963– )
- Seyhan Kurt, poet and sociologist (1971)
- Aras Onur, poet, author (1982– )
- Yusuf Ziya Ortaç, poet (1896–1967)
