= Sedat Simavi Literature Award =

Turkish literary award

The Sedat Simavi Literature Prize is a Turkish literary award presented annually. It was established in 1977 by Sedat Simavi Foundation, in memory of author and journalist, Sedat Simavi. The prize is given also in nine different areas in sport, TV, radio, reporting, healthy, science, social sciences and visual arts.

== Award winners ==
- 2024 Şebnem İşigüzel
- 2023 Füruzan
- 2022 Selçuk Altun
- 2021 Orhan Pamuk
- 2020 Beşir Ayvazoğlu
- 2019 Hidayet Sayın
- 2018 Kamuran Şipal
- 2017 Cevat Çapan
- 2016 Haluk Oral
- 2015 Nilüfer Kuyaş
- 2014 Murat Gülsoy
- 2013 Hasan Ali Toptaş
- 2012 Ahmet Cemal
- 2011 Burhan Sönmez
- 2010 Adnan Binyazar
- 2009 Cemil Kavukçu
- 2008 Arif Damar
- 2007 Ahmet Oktay
- 2006 Tarık Dursun K.
- 2005 Latife Tekin
- 2004 Demir Özlü
- 2003 Selim İleri
- 2002 Tomris Uyar
- 2001 Erdal Öz
- 2000 Jale Parla
- 1999 Tahsin Yücel
- 1998 Nezihe Meriç
- 1997 Fakir Baykurt, Feyza Hepçilingirler
- 1996 Orhan Duru
- 1995 Nermi Uygur, Mîna Urgan
- 1994 Bilge Karasu
- 1993 Oktay Akbal, Vüs'at O. Bener
- 1992 Mehmet Fuat, Gülten Akın
- 1991 Cevdet Kudret, Fethi Naci
- 1990 Sabahattin Kudret Aksal
- 1989 Vedat Günyol
- 1988 İlhan Berk, Ferit Edgü
- 1987 Hilmi Yavuz
- 1986 Salâh Birsel
- 1985 Yaşar Kemal
- 1984 Turgut Uyar
- 1983 Pertev Naili Boratav, Haldun Taner
- 1982 No awarded
- 1981 Edip Cansever
- 1980 Oktay Rifat
- 1979 Adalet Ağaoğlu
- 1978 Melih Cevdet Anday
- 1977 Peride Celal, Fazıl Hüsnü Dağlarca

== See also ==
- List of literary awards
- List of years in literature
- Literary award
- Turkish literature
