= Turkish Writers' Union =

Turkish trade union and literary organization

- Türkiye Yazarlar Sendikası
- Abbreviation: TYS
- Formation: 4 February 1974; 52 years ago
- Type: Trade union and literary organization
- Purpose: Writers' professional rights and freedom of expression
- Headquarters: Istanbul
- Location: Turkey
- Members: 937 (2025)
- President: Adnan Özyalçıner
- Website: turkiyeyazarlarsendikasi.org

The Turkish Writers' Union (Turkish: Türkiye Yazarlar Sendikası, abbreviated TYS) is an independent trade union and literary organization for writers based in Istanbul, Turkey. The organization uses the English name Writers Syndicate of Turkey in some of its publications. It was founded on 4 February 1974 to defend writers' professional, economic and social rights and to campaign for freedom of speech and publication.

The union is sometimes confused with the Turkish Authors' Association (Türkiye Yazarlar Birliği), since the names of both organizations have sometimes been rendered in English as the "Writers Union of Turkey". The Turkish Authors' Association is a separate cultural association founded in 1978.

== History ==
=== Foundation ===
The union emerged in the political and cultural climate following the 1971 Turkish military memorandum, a period when books were banned or confiscated and writers and intellectuals were prosecuted. The initiative was led by Yaşar Kemal and Aziz Nesin. Seventy poets, novelists, journalists, playwrights and screenwriters attended the founding meeting on 4 February 1974.

The founding committee included Yaşar Kemal, Aziz Nesin, Bekir Yıldız, Adnan Özyalçıner, Leyla Erbil, Tomris Uyar, Turgut Uyar, Orhon Murat Arıburnu, Adalet Ağaoğlu, Nihat Behram and Ali Özgentürk. Yaşar Kemal was elected the first president, Bekir Yıldız the deputy president and Adnan Özyalçıner the general secretary. Aziz Nesin succeeded Yaşar Kemal as president in 1975.

During the late 1970s the organization campaigned for freedom of expression and developed relations with writers' organizations outside Turkey. It also organized a meeting of writers' organizations from the Balkan countries in Istanbul.

=== Closure and trial after the 1980 coup ===
Following the 1980 Turkish coup d'état, the activities of the union were halted along with those of other trade unions and civil society organizations. Aziz Nesin and the members of the executive board were prosecuted on the allegation that they had continued to operate an illegal organization. The proceedings attracted international attention because the defendants included several prominent Turkish writers and intellectuals.

After a trial lasting approximately three and a half years, the union's 18 executives were acquitted. The organization was re-established in 1987, with Aziz Nesin again serving as president.

=== Later development ===
Aziz Nesin was succeeded by Oktay Akbal in 1989. Under Akbal and his successor Ataol Behramoğlu, the union expanded its work concerning copyright, writers' social security and freedom of publication. During the presidency of architect and writer Cengiz Bektaş, it established an literature museum and archive, generally known as the TYS Edebiyat Müze-Belgeliği. The collection was later transferred to Kadıköy.

The union marked its 50th anniversary in 2024 with literary meetings, commemorative publications and public events in Istanbul.

At its 24th ordinary general assembly, held in Kadıköy on 14 June 2025, Adnan Özyalçıner was re-elected to the executive board and continued as president for the 2025–2027 term. The union reported 937 members in its 2023–2025 activity report.

== Aims and activities ==
According to its statutes, the union's stated purposes are to protect the labour and professional rights of writers; defend and develop their legal, social, cultural and economic rights; and pursue legal action in support of freedom of speech and writing.

Its activities have included:

- campaigning against censorship and restrictions on publication;
- issuing statements concerning freedom of expression and human rights;
- supporting writers in disputes with publishers;
- participating in book fairs and organizing literary meetings, readings and commemorations;
- publishing bulletins, books and commemorative volumes;
- maintaining an archive and museum collection devoted to Turkish literary history.

The organization has also cooperated with bodies such as PEN Turkey, the Turkish Publishers Association and the Turkish Journalists' Association on questions concerning freedom of the press and publication.

== Publications ==
A 1998 survey by the Friedrich Ebert Foundation recorded the union as publishing the monthly literary journal TYS Edebiyat and the newsletter TYS Aylık Bülten. Its later publications have included numbered bulletins, commemorative books and volumes devoted to writers and literary events.

== Presidents ==
The presidents of the union have been:

President	Term
Yaşar Kemal	1974–1975
Aziz Nesin	1975–1980
Activities halted following the 1980 military coup
Aziz Nesin	1987–1989
Oktay Akbal	1989–1995
Ataol Behramoğlu	1995–1999
Cengiz Bektaş	1999–2005
Enver Ercan	2005–2011
Mustafa Köz	2011–2019
Adnan Özyalçıner	2019–present
