= Yücel =

Yücel is a masculine given name and surname of Turkish origin. Notable people with the name include:

== Given name ==
- Yücel Çolak (born 1968), Turkish football manager
- Yücel Gündoğdu (born 1985), Turkish karateka
- Yücel İldiz (born 1953), Turkish football manager
- Yücel Oğurlu (born 1970), Turkish academic and professor of law
- Yücel Uyar (born 1960), Turkish football manager and former footballer
- Mustafa Yücel Özbilgin (1942–2006), Turkish supreme court magistrate

== Surname ==
- Can Emre Yücel (born 1983), Turkish football player
- Can Yücel (1926–1999), Turkish poet
- Deniz Yücel (born 1973), German-Turkish journalist
- Emrah Yucel (born 1968), Turkish designer of film and television posters
- Hasan Âli Yücel (1897–1961), former minister of national education of Turkey
- Keklik Yücel (born 1968), Dutch politician of Turkish descent
- Kenan Yücel (born 1974), Turkish poet and writer.
- Mert Yücel, Turkish musician
- Nedim Yücel (born 1979), Turkish basketball player
- Tahsin Yücel (1933–2016), Turkish writer
- Uğur Yücel (born 1957), Turkish actor, film director and producer
