= Aras Onur =

- Born: Onur Erkan; 23 April 1982 (age 44); Ankara, Turkey
- Status: Single
- Occupations: Author, poet, stagewriter, screenwriter
- Years active: 2004–present

Aras Onur (born 23 April 1982) is a Turkish author, poet, and columnist.

== Early life ==
Aras Onur was born in Ankara and is a graduate of TED Ankara College and University of Ankara. He started his literary career in the early 2000s. Openly gay, he has been often associated with local LGBT literature.

He is often identified as a socialist columnist in the media, although his conservative tendencies are also often noted.

Aras Onur was pointed as mastermind of "Kindle a Candle" protests, a wave of civil series of unrest in Turkey began on 11 September 2015. The protesters were led by a common manifest released by columnists of a national newspaper named Karsi, in which the slogan "Kindle a Candle, Stand Out" was captioned.

== Career ==
His first book of poetry was published in 2004, called Sudan Masallar, integrating a wordplay in Turkish which could be construed either as "tales from the water" or "arbitrary tales". His synopsis text for a short film (Gıyabında Cam Kadeh) ("The Wineglass in absentia" in English) was awarded the second place by Istanbul Bilgi University in 2007. During the same year one of his plays, Üç Kapı (Eng: "Three Doors"), made its theatrical debut. He was listed as one of the contemporary Turkish poets awaiting translation, among Cemal Sureya, Birhan Keskin, Turgut Uyar, and Edip Cansever.

He had written for Karsi columns for two years as the acting-editor until he resigned from office in October 2016, following to ban of accessing to paper's website.

== Corpus ==
=== Books ===
Year	Title	Class of Literature	Notes
2004	Sudan Masallar	Poetry	The initial foray of the author into poetry.
2014	Beylerbeyi'nde Son Tango	Poetry	
2015 (expected)	His Secret Diary	Novel	Roman-a-clef; based on a true story of a secret agent working for the Turkish intelligence agency.
2017	Direnc, Onur ve Dahasi	Academic	Editor for an LGBTQ rights book consisting of ten chapters.
2018	Pars ile Porsuk	Novel	Roman-a-clef; based on a true bromance story of a gay hero narrator and his buddy.
2018	Paris'ten Dondugumde	Poetry	

=== Stageplays ===
Year	Title	Role	Notes
2007	Three Doors	Stagewriter	Performed by a small theatre in 2007.
2015	The Unknown Accessory	Adaptor and co-writer	Based on a tale of Okan Cem Çırakoğlu. In production.

=== Released Works ===
Date	Title	Class	Issue
2007	Waiting for Godot	Adaptation of Samuel Beckett's stageplay	Kul Oyku
2014 Jan.	Cay / Tea	Poem	Hayal Quarterly Magazine, Issue 48
2014 Sep.	Juan	Short tale	Hayal Quarterly Magazine, Issue 51
2016 May	Die Why	Translated Poem	Off the Coast, Maine's International Poetry Journal Volume XXII, No.2
2016 June, 23	Leave Me Not, Geodesy, Lollipop	Translated Poems	Five 2 One Literary Magazine, #thesideshow 23 June 2016
