= Mustafa Aydoğan =

Turkish poet and writer

- Born: 1 June 1964 (age 60); Kahramanmaraş, Turkey
- Occupation: Poet
- Education: Gazi University
- Notable awards: Turkish Authors' Association - Poet of the Year (2012, Bugün Konuştuklarımız)

Mustafa Aydoğan (born 1 June 1964) is a Turkish poet and writer.

== Life and career ==
He graduated from Karamanlı Primary School in 1975 and Kahramanmaraş Imam-Hatip High School in 1982. He had his university education in Ankara. He graduated from Gazi University, School of Business Administration, in 1989. In 1990, he entered the Ministry of Finance as an Accounting Trainee Controller. He became Accounting Controller in 1993 and Accounting Chief Controller in 2000. He still continues to work in the same ministry.

In 1981, he published a literature magazine named Esra Yazları with his friends. His first poems and writings were published in this magazine. In the same years, he wrote on the art pages of some local newspapers published in Kahramanmaraş. In 1981, he corresponded with Cahit Zarifoğlu and sent his poems to him. One of the first poems he sent was published in Mavera magazine in 1982 and received letters of praise from Zarifoğlu.

He started to live in Ankara in 1984. His poems and writings have been published in many literary magazines. His works appeared in important literary magazines of his period such as Mavera, Yedi İklim, Dergâh, and Hece.

In 1997, he became one of the founders of Edebiyat Ortamı magazine. The magazine's publication stooped after one year of operation. In March 2008, Edebiyat Ortamı magazine started to be published again with Aydoğan as the editor-in-chief. In 2010, he published the Edebiyat Ortamı Poetry Yearbook as a supplement to the magazine. He continued to prepare this yearbook for five years. He led the preparation of the Edebiyat Ortamı Story Yearbook and had the yearbook published as a supplement to the magazine from 2011. He left the editorial staff of the magazine in early 2015.

In 2006, he published reviews in the book supplement of Yeni Şafak newspaper. He worked as a columnist for Yeni Söz and Milat newspapers for a short time.

His first poetry book Kendini Aynalarda Çoğaltan Şehir was published in 1997.

== Bibliography ==
=== Poetry ===
- Kendini Aynalarda Çoğaltan Şehir (1997)
- Bir Dolu Bakır Yaz (1999)
- Bahar Köpüğü (2004)
- Az Önce (2012)
- Bugün Konuştuklarımız (2012)
- Güneşin Ayak İzini Takip Et (2014)

=== Essays ===
- Yazma Sevinci (2014)
- Kitabın Kimliği (2015)

=== Assessments ===
- Yüzdeki Leke (2014)
- Aşk Yolcuları (2015)

=== Biography ===
- Yalnızlık Mahşeri Alaeddin Özdenören (2015)
- İnancın Parıltısı Nuri Pakdil (2018)

=== Anthology ===
- Kırk Şairden 40 Aşk Şiiri (2016)

=== Prepared for publication ===
- Şiir Beni Korkutmuştur- Alâeddin Özdenören'in Söyleşileri (2017)
