= Sabit İnce =

Turkish poet, writer and Islamic scholar (born 1954)

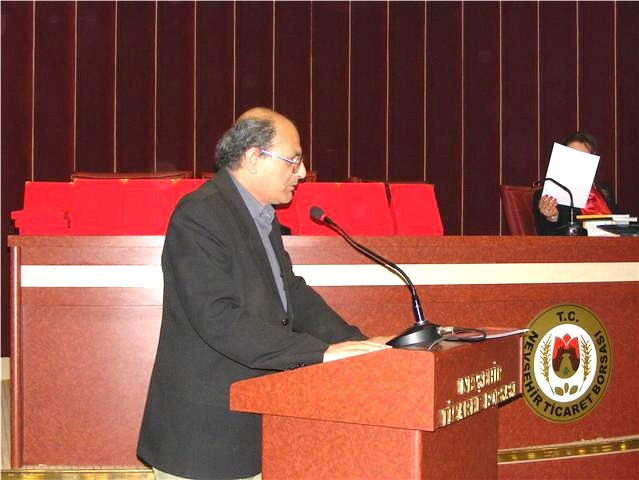
- Born: 27 August 1954 (age 71); Kozakli, Nevşehir, Turkey
- Education: Marmara University
- Occupations: Poet; Writer; Academic
- Spouse: Nurcan İnce
- Children: Nazende Demirel; Muhammed İnce; Çağrı İnce

Sabit İnce (born 27 August 1954 in Nevşehir) is a Turkish poet, writer and Islamic scholar.

== Early life ==
He graduated from economic administrative Faculty of Marmara University.

== Career ==
He was the editor-in-chief of the Papirus literary magazine. Sabit Ince is a member of the Second New Generation of Turkish poetry, an abstract and postmodern movement created as a backlash against the more popular-based Anadolu Hececileri movement. Love, mainly through its erotic entity, is a popular theme of ince's works. Sabit's poems and articles were published in magazines including Tore, Devlet, Deniz Postası, Bizim Anadolu , Tercüman, Hergün, Ortadogu, Kayseri Hakimiyet and Yeni Kayseri . "son dakika newspaper"

== See also ==
- List of contemporary Turkish poets
