= Yeditepe (magazine) =

Literary magazine in Turkey (1950-1984)

- Editor-in-chief: Hüsamettin Bozok
- Categories: Literary magazine
- Frequency: Biweekly; Monthly
- Publisher: Yeditepe Publications
- Founder: Hüsamettin Bozok
- Founded: 1950
- First issue: 1 April 1950
- Final issue: 1984
- Country: Turkey
- Based in: Istanbul
- Language: Turkish

Yeditepe (Turkish: Seven Hills) was a literary magazine which was published in Istanbul, Turkey, from 1950 to 1984 with a five-year interruption. Its title was a reference to both Istanbul and seven arts or traditional subdivision of the arts. It was one of the opposition media outlets in the 1950s and also, an influential literary magazine during its run.

== History and profile ==
The first issue of Yeditepe appeared in Istanbul on 1 April 1950. The founder and editor of the magazine was Hüsamettin Bozok. It was established based on the literary tradition of the Varlık magazine, but it focused more on the social side of literature.

Yeditepe was published by a company with the same name which was also owned by Bozok. It was started as a four-page biweekly literary journal, and from 1951 its page number was expanded, but its frequency was redesigned as a monthly. The magazine began to appear on a biweekly basis from 1952.

Major contributors of Yeditepe included Orhan Kemal, Yaşar Kemal, Samim Kocagöz, Melih Cevdet Anday, Oktay Rifat, Edip Cansever, and Adnan Özyalçıner. Cemal Süreya's poem Gül (Turkish: Rose) written in a new poetic style was first featured in the magazine. It was the only magazine which published poems of the Garip movement, also known as the First New Movement, and also of the Second New Movement. In Yeditepe various short stories were published. There were frequent articles on existentialism in the magazine between 1960 and 1970 when this philosophical approach was extremely popular in Turkey. The magazine also reported news about art galleries and exhibitions.

Yeditepe ceased publication in 1974 and was restarted in 1979. The magazine permanently folded due to financial problems in 1984 after producing a total of 439 issues.

A poetry prize with the same name was awarded by Hüsamettin Bozok between 1955 and 1967 and between 1976 and 1984.
