= Refik Restaurant =

Refik Meyhanesi

Restaurant information
- Established: 1954
- Closed: 2020
- Owner: Adopted children of Refik Arslan
- Previous owner: Refik Arslan (1954–2011)
- Location: Asmalı Mescit, Sofyalı Sk. No:7, 34430 Beyoğlu/Istanbul, Istanbul
- Coordinates: 41.0297640203473°N 28.974491940918377°E

Refik Restaurant was a tavern in Asmalı Mescit, Beyoğlu, Turkey founded by Refik Arlslan (1923–2011) in 1954.

Arslan ran the Refik for almost 70 years. The restaurant remained operational for some time after Refik Arslan died in 2011. Refik was known as "one of the last remaining 'real' tavern keepers". After his death it is noted that what used to be place of community changed into a generic for-profit restaurant, losing its magic. It eventually closed down in 2020.

== Significance among poets ==
Refik had long been known as a place where many well known poets would frequent. These include Refik Durbaş, Bekir Sami Sertöz, Özdemir Asaf, Ferit Edgü and Tezer Özlü. The last two of whose correspondence regarding the tavern has been documented:

Boğaz tepelerini, Asmalımescit'i, Refik Lokantası'nı ne kadar düşündüm ilk günlerde. Ama mektubun bana çok güç verdi, dünyayı gene kendi elimde sıkılacak bir limon gibi görmeye başladım… Sessiz sakin, ruhsuz insanlar (Zürich için). İstanbul'da ne var, ne yok? Beyoğlu doludur. İstanbul'a gelir gelmez Refik'e gideceğim…
How much I thought about the Bosphorus hills, Asmalımescit and Refik Restaurant in the first days. But your letter gave me a lot of strength, I started to see the world again like a lemon to be squeezed in my own hands... Quiet, soulless people (for Zürich). What's going on in Istanbul? Beyoğlu is probably full. As soon as I come to Istanbul, I will go to Refik…

— Tezer Özlü

The poet Özdemir Asaf would, as documented by fellow poet Refik Durbaş, fill his table with whites. These include rakı mixed with water, ayran or yoghurt, feta cheese and cauliflower.

As also people from other branches have been noted to have been there including Gürdal Duyar (sculptor).
