= Bilge Karasu =

Turkish writer (1930–1995)

- Born: 9 January 1930; Istanbul, Turkey
- Died: 14 July 1995 (aged 65); Ankara, Turkey
- Education: Istanbul University
- Occupations: Poet, philosopher
- Writing career
- Years active: 1924–1976
- Notable awards: TDK Translation Prize, Pegasus Prize, Sedat Simavi Literature Award

Bilge Karasu (9 January 1930 – 13 July 1995), was a Turkish short story writer and novelist.

== Biography ==
Bilge Karasu was born in 1930, in Istanbul. Bilge Karasu's parents, who later converted to Islam, were of Jewish origin, although he does not have any kinship with Emanuel Karasu, an Ottoman politician of Jewish origin. He studied at Şişli Terakki High School and at Istanbul University, Faculty of Literature, Department of Philosophy. He published articles on art criticism in the Forum magazine between 1954 and 1959.

In 1963, he returned from Europe, where he had studied on a Rockefeller scholarship. In 1964, he started to work as a translator at the General Directorate of Press, Broadcasting, and Tourism and in the foreign broadcasting service of Ankara Radio.

Karasu wrote radio plays for Ankara Radioı. He worked as a lecturer at Hacettepe University's Philosophy Department from 1974 until his death.

He lived in a small basement on Nilgün Street in Ankara for years. He died on 14 July 1995, at Hacettepe University Hospital, Ankara where he was being treated for pancreatic cancer. He is buried in Karşıyaka Cemetery.

== Bibliography ==
=== Stories ===
- Troya’da Ölüm Vardı (1963)
- Uzun Sürmüş Bir Günün Akşamı (1970)
- Göçmüş Kediler Bahçesi (1980)
- Kısmet Büfesi (1982)
- Lağımlaranası ya da Beyoğlu
- Susanlar (2008) (öykü, şiir, deneme, röportaj)

=== Novels ===
- Gece (1985)
- Kılavuz (1990)

=== Essays ===
- Ne Kitapsız Ne Kedisiz (1994)
- Narla İncire Gazel (1995)
- Altı Ay Bir Güz (1996) (ölümünden sonra yayınlandı)

=== Radio plays ===
- Peter Pan (Radyo için oyunlaştıran Bilge Karasu) (1967), Ankara Radyosu
- Sevilmek, (Ocak 1970), Ankara Radyosu
- Kerem ile Kediler, (Mart 1970), Ankara Radyosu
- Gidememek
- Aşk

=== Translations ===
- Abraham Lincoln, Emil Ludwing, 1953, Cep Kitapları
- Doktor Martino, William Faulkner, 1956, Yenilik Publications
- Bella'nın Ölümü, Georges Simenon, 1981, Karacan Publications
- Salgına İnanıyorum, Jean Cocteau, 1968, Türk Dili (Sinema Ozel Sayısı), Ankara: Volume: 196 (January 1968), p. 422-425
- İşin Özü Bir Öykü Anlatmaktır, Jean Renoir, Türk Dili (Sinema Ozel Sayısı), Ankara: Volume: 196 (January 1968), p. 426-428

== Awards ==
- 1963 Turkish Language Association Translation Award, The Dead Man, translated from D. H. Lawrence

== Books written about ==
- Bilge Karasu Aramızda (1997) (Prepared by: Füsun Akatlı, Müge Gürsoy Sökmen)
- Yazının da Yırtılıverdiği Yer (Bir Bilge Karasu Okuması) (2007); Author: Cem İleri; Metis Publications
- Bilge Karasu'yu Okumak (Prepared by: Doğan Yaşat), Metis Publications, 2013.
- Excavating Memory: Bilge Karasu’s Istanbul and Walter Benjamin’s Berlin (2020); Author: Ülker Gökberk; Academic Studies Press

== See also ==
- MEB 100 Türk edebiyatçısı listesi
