= Papirüs =

Literary magazine in Turkey (1960–1981)

- Editor: Cemal Süreya
- Categories: Literary magazine
- Frequency: Monthly; Triannual
- Founder: Cemal Süreya
- Founded: 1960
- First issue: August 1960
- Final issue: March 1981
- Country: Turkey
- Based in: Istanbul
- Language: Turkish

Papirüs (Turkish: Papyrus) was a literary magazine which was published in Istanbul between 1960 and 1981 with some interruptions. The magazine is known for its founder and editor Cemal Süreya who was a poet and its well-known contributors.

== History and profile ==
Papirüs was established by Cemal Süreya, and its first issue appeared in August 1960. Immediately after its start the magazine temporarily closed down due to financial problems. It was restarted in 1961 and managed to publish only three issues in that year. The magazine was republished in June 1966 and came out monthly until June 1970. In this period Tomris Uyar and Ülkü Tamer along with Cemal Süreya were instrumental in the reestablishment of the magazine.

Papirüs was restarted in 1980 as a triannual publication but permanently ceased publication in March 1981. The magazine produced a total of fifty-three issues during its run.

Papirüs mostly featured poems, book and journal reviews and contained a section for biographies. It published thematic special issues.

== Contributors ==
Major contributors of Papirüs included Sezai Karakoç, İsmet Özel, Ataol Behramoğlu, Behçet Necatigil, Haldun Taner, Leyla Erbil, Ahmed Arif, Ece Ayhan, Fazıl Hüsnü Dağlarca, Enis Batur, Nâzım Hikmet, Refik Durbaş, Salah Birsel and Yaşar Kemal. A conservative poet, Cahit Zarifoğlu, also contributed to the magazine.
