= George Messo =

George Messo (born April 10, 1969) is an expatriate English poet and translator who was born in rural Lincolnshire, near the town of Barton-Upon-Humber. He moved to Trabzon, Turkey, in 1998 and has since lived in Oman and Saudi Arabia. He was the editor of Near East Review from 2001 to 2007. Messo is a Fellow of the Royal Asiatic Society.

== Poetry ==
Messo's poetry collections are From the Pine Observatory (2000), Entrances (2006), Hearing Still (2009),Violades & Appledown (2012) and The Invention of Lars Ruth (2021). He appeared in the 2006 Stride anthology, The Allotment: New Lyric Poets, edited by Andy Brown, and the 2015 Bloodaxe anthology Lifesaving Poems edited by Anthony Wilson.

The Economist has associated Messo with the so-called Istanbul School, which includes the English poet and travel writer John Ash.

== Translation ==
Messo is a prominent translator of Turkish poetry. He was shortlisted for the Popescu Prize for European poetry translation in 2007 for his versions of İlhan Berk, A Leaf about to Fall: Selected Poems (2006) and again in 2011 for İkinci Yeni: The Turkish Avant-Garde (2009). Other books include both İlhan Berk's Madrigals (2008) and poetic trilogy, The Book of Things (2009), two major anthologies İkinci Yeni: The Turkish Avant-Garde (2009) and From This Bridge: Contemporary Turkish Women Poets (2010), as well as Gonca Özmen's The Sea Within (2011), Birhan Keskin's & Silk & Love & Flame (2013) and Orhan Veli's Complete Poems (2016). Messo is the editor of the Turkish Modern Poets Series for Red Hand Books, and the editor of the bi-lingual journal Turkish Poetry Today.
