= İlhan Berk =

Turkish poet (1918-2008)

- Born: 18 November 1918; Manisa, Ottoman Empire
- Died: 28 August 2008 (aged 89); Muğla, Turkey
- Occupations: Poet, essayist
- Writing career
- Period: 1935–2008
- Literary movement: Postmodern literature

İlhan Berk (18 November 1918 – 28 August 2008) was a leading Turkish poet. He was a dominant figure in the postmodern current in Turkish poetry (termed, "İkinci Yeni"; "The second new generation") and was very influential among Turkish literary circles.

== Biography ==
Berk was born in Manisa, Turkey in 1918, and as a child witnessed the Fire of Manisa. He received a teacher's training in Balıkesir. He graduated from the French Language Department of Gazi University in Ankara. Between 1945 and 1955, Berk served as a teacher. He later began to work for the publishing office of Ziraat Bank as a translator (1956–1969). He became specialized in the translation of poetry, notably by translating into Turkish works by Arthur Rimbaud and Ezra Pound. In his later years, Berk resided in Bodrum, where he died on 28 August 2008.

== Poetry ==
Berk's poetry evolved from the approach of an epical socialist to the dreamy vision of a lyrical and erotic individual. He made the "object" visible in its glory and aimed to break down the meaning. Berk's poetry takes its roots from mythology, and a synthesis of Western and Eastern poetry traditions, yet he accomplishes to create a unique and postmodern approach. Peter Riley, in an analysis of Berk's work published in The Fortnightly Review, suggests the poet sometimes "runs poetry itself to an extremity at which it can no longer function as language."

History, geography, visual arts, and cities such as Istanbul, Paris and Ankara feed Berk's poetry. His themes are supported by a sizable vocabulary that includes colloquial words as well as very specific ones, such as musical terms and local names of plants.

A significant body of Berk's work is now available in English, most notably A Leaf About To Fall: Selected Poems (2006), Madrigals (2008), The Book of Things (2009) and New selected poems 1947-2008 (2016); all translated by George Messo.

== Bibliography in English ==
- New selected poems 1947-2008, translated by George Messo. Shearsman Books. 2016. ISBN 978-1-84861-461-1.
- The Book of Things, translated by George Messo. Salt Publishing. 2009. ISBN 978-1-84471-523-7.
- İkinci Yeni: The Turkish Avant-Garde, translated by George Messo. Shearsman Books. 2009. ISBN 978-1-84861-066-8.
- Madrigals, translated by George Messo. Shearsman Books. 2008. ISBN 978-1-905700-73-8.
- A leaf about to Fall: Selected Poems, translated by George Messo. Salt Publishing. 2006. ISBN 978-1-84471-274-8.
- Selected Poems, translated by Önder Otçu. Talisman House Publications. 2004. ISBN 978-1-58498-033-9.
- History of a Face, translated by Talat S. Halman. Cross-Cultural Communications. 1991. ISBN 978-0-89304-285-1.

== Awards ==
- 1979 Turkish Language Association Award
- 1980 Behçet Necatigil Poetry Award
- 1983 Yeditepe Poetry Prize
- 1988 Sedat Simavi Literature Award

== See also ==
- List of contemporary Turkish poets

== Resources ==
- "İlhan Berk bibliography" (in Turkish). siirgen.com.
