= Baki Süha Ediboğlu =

Baki Süha Ediboğlu (1915 – September 15, 1972) was a Turkish poet and author.

== Biography ==
Ediboğlu was born in Antalya in 1915. He graduated from Istanbul Hayriye High School in 1936. He didn’t complete his education at Istanbul University, Faculty of Law or Ankara University, Faculty of Language, History and Geography. He began to work as a journalist and wrote for the newspapers Tan, Akşam, Cumhuriyet (1934–40), then he worked at Ankara Radio and at the General Directorate of Press and Broadcasting. After, he worked as the Chief Broadcaster for Istanbul Radio and as the Director of İzmir Radio (1950–56). He worked as an assistant director at Istanbul Radio (1966) and finally as a consultant.

His poems, stories and articles on various subjects were published in magazines and newspapers such as Servet-i Fünûn (1929), Ülkü, Aile(1942–48), Varlık (1934–70), and Cumhuriyet. He read selected poems for radio programs. He also wrote plays and stories for radio.

== Bibliography ==
Poetry

- "Cenup" (The South, 1942)
- "Gece Yağmuru" (Night Rain, 1947)
- "İşaret" (Sign, 1953)
- "Karanlıkta Geçen Gemiler" (Ships Sailing in the Darkness, 1958)

Short stories

- "Sel Geliyor" (A Flood is Coming, 1944)

Anthologies

- "Türk Şiirinden Örnekler" (Examples from Turkish Poetry, 1944)
- "Atatürk İçin Bütün Şiirler" (All Poems Written for Atatürk, anthology, in collaboration with Faruk Çağlayan, 1962)

Biographies

- "Falih Rıfkı Atay Konuşuyor" (Falih Rıfkı Atay is Speaking, 1946)
- "Ünlü Türk Bestekarları" (Famous Turkish Composers, 1962)

Memoirs

- "Bizim Kuşak ve Ötekileri" (Our Generation and Beyond, memoirs of 36 poets, 1968)

== See also ==
- List of contemporary Turkish poets
