= Ece Ayhan =

Turkish poet

Ece Ayhan Çağlar (September 10, 1931 in Muğla – July 12, 2002 in İzmir) was a contemporary Turkish poet. He used the name Ece Ayhan in his poems. He is one of the prominent figures of the II. New Movement, yet he preferred to refer to this movement as Civilian Poetry. His book Blind Cat Black and Orthodoxies features examples of homoerotic poetry in Modern Turkish literature.

Çağlar was among the contributors of the literary magazine Papirüs which was edited by Cemal Süreya.

== Selected works ==
- Kınar Hanım'ın Denizleri (1959) (Seas of Kinar Hanim)
- Bakışsız Bir Kedi Kara (1965) (A Blind Cat Black)
- Ortodokslular (1968) (Orthodoxies)
- Devlet ve Tabiat (1973)(Government and Nature)
- Yort Savul (Collection of the above works, 1977)
- Zambaklı Padişah (1981) (The Sultan's Lily)
- Defterler (Diaries, 1981) (Notebooks)
- Çok Eski Adıyladır (1982) (With Its Very Old Name)
- Kolsuz bir Hattat (Prose, 1987) (An Armless Calligrapher)
- Çanakkaleli Melahat'a İki El Mektup ya da Özel Bir Fuhuş Tarihi (1991) (Two Rounds Of Letter To Melahat Of Çanakkale or A Special History Of Prostitution)
- Sivil Şiirler (1993) (Civil Poems)
- Son Şiirler (1993) (Last Poems)
- Bütün Yort Savul'lar (Complete poetry, 1994)

== See also ==
- List of contemporary Turkish poets
