= Tomris Uyar =

Turkish author and translator

- Born: Tomris Gedik; 15 March 1941; Istanbul, Turkey
- Died: 4 July 2003 (aged 62); Istanbul, Turkey
- Resting place: Zincirlikuyu Cemetery, Istanbul
- Occupations: Writer, translator
- Partner: Cemal Süreya (1964–1967)

Tomris Uyar (15 March 1941 – 4 July 2003) was a Turkish writer and translator. She was born in Istanbul, the daughter of two lawyers and granddaughter of Republican People's Party politician Süleyman Sırrı Gedik. She was educated at the British Girls' Secondary School and at Arnavutköy American Girls' College, now called Robert College (1961). She graduated from the Journalism Institute affiliated to the Faculty of Economics of Istanbul University (1963).

The grave of the author, who died in 2003 due to esophageal cancer, is in Zincirlikuyu Mezarlığı.

== Life and career ==
Uyar, who is one of the founders of Papirüs magazine together with Cemal Süreya and Ülkü Tamer, has published her essays, criticisms and book introductions in magazines such as Yeni Dergi, and Varlık. She won the Sait Faik Story Award in 1979 with Yürekte Bukağı and in 1986 with Journey to Summer from her ten short story collections. Uyar's diaries, of which more than 60 translations have been published, have been published under the general title of "Gündökümü".

Completing her undergraduate study at İstanbul University at the Department of Journal, she continued her writing career with translation, stories and articles in various journals. In her own writings, Tomris Uyar used the techniques of “interior monologue-dialogue” and “stream of consciousness”, and made experimental innovations. By using stream of consciousness, she not only reflected the inner worlds of their characters but also worked on thefluency by omitting certain punctuation marks to catch her readers’ attention.

Uyar was a prolific writer of short stories, of which eleven volumes were published. She translated into Turkish works by authors including Virginia Woolf, Edgar Allan Poe, Jorge Luis Borges, Lewis Carroll, Antoine de Saint-Exupéry and Gabriel García Márquez.

In 1975 she and her husband Turgut Uyar won a Turkish Language Society (Türk Dil Kurumu) prize for their translation of Lucretius' natural encyclopedia De rerum natura (Evrenin yapısı, Istanbul 1974). In 1980 and 1987 she was one of two Turkish authors who were awarded the Sait Faik Short Story Award. In 1987 she received the Theater Art Development Foundation's annual award in memory of actor Avni Dilligil, and in 2002 the Dünya award for the best narrative volume of the year. In the same year she was awarded the Sedat Simavi Literature Award.

== Private life ==
The marriage of Tomris Uyar, who made his first marriage to the poet Ülkü Tamer in 1963, ended in 1964 after their daughter Ekin was drowned in milk. Tomris Uyar married the poet Turgut Uyar in 1969 and they had a son named Hayri Turgut Uyar. Hayri Turgut Uyar is now a lecturer at ITÜ(Istanbul Teknik Üniversitesi).

Edip Cansever is also in love with Tomris Uyar, who was in love with Cemal Süreya while he was married. In fact, at a raki table where he sat alone with Tomris, Cansever wrote on a napkin, "Tomris used to love rakı, and I used to love her..."

== Tribute ==
In 2020, Google celebrated her with a Google Doodle.

== Selected works ==
Short stories and other writings

- İpek ve bakır (Silk and Copper) – 1971
- Ödeşmeler (Paybacks) – 1973
- Dizboyu papatyalar (Kneehigh Daisies) – 1975
- Yürekte bukağı (Heartbreak) – 1979, winner of the 1980 Sait Faik prize
- Yaz düşleri / Düş kışları (Summer Dreams / Dream Winters) – 1981
- Gecegezen kızlar (Girls Wandering at Night) – 1983
- Yaza yolculuk (Journey to Summer) – 1985, winner of the 1986 Sait Faik prize
- Sekizinci günah (The Eighth Sin) – 1990
- Otuzların kadını (Woman of the Thirties) – 1992
- Aramızdaki şey (What is between us) – 1998
- Şiirde dün yok mu: Turgut Uyar üzerine yazılar (No yesterday in poetry? Articles on Turgut Uyar) – 1999

Diaries

- Gündökümü 75 (Dayscript 75) – 1976
- Sesler, yüzler, sokaklar (Voices, Faces, Streets) – 1981
- Günlerin tortusu (1980–1984): bir uyumsuzun notları (Sediment of the Days – Notes of a Misfit) – 1985
- Yazılı günler (1985–1988) (Written days) – 1989
- Tanışma günleri / anları: (1989–1995) (Meeting days / moments) – 1995
- Yüzleşmeler: bir uyumsuzun notları, 1995–1999 (Confrontations: Notes of a Misfit) – 2000

Compilations

- Gündökümü (1975–1980): bir uyumsuzun notları (Dayscript – Notes of a Misfit) – 1990
- Rus ruleti (Russian Roulette) – 1985
- İki yaka iki uç (Two Sides Two Ends: Short Stories) – 1992

== Bibliography ==
- Tayfun Demir: Türkische Literatur in deutscher Sprache. Eine Bibliographie mit Erläuterungen. Sekretariat für gemeinsame Kulturarbeit in NRW, Duisburg 1995, ISBN 3-89279-510-X, S. 80. (German)
- Luis Mitler: Contemporary Turkish writers. A critical bio-bibliography of leading writers in the Turkish Republican period up to 1980. Indiana University Press, Bloomington (Indiana) 1988, ISBN 0-933070-14-4, S. 259.
