= Leyla Erbil =

Turkish writer (1931–2013)

Leylâ Erbil
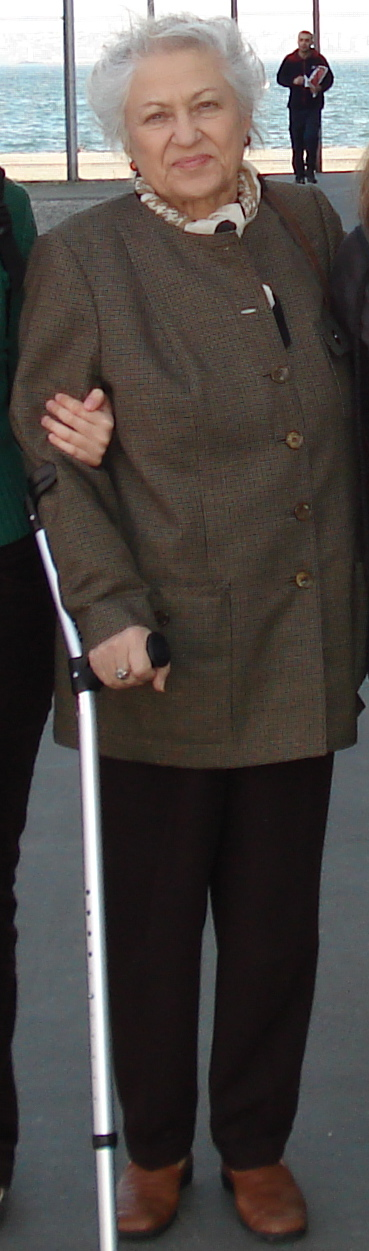
- Born: 12 January 1931; Istanbul, Turkey
- Died: 19 July 2013 (aged 82); Istanbul, Turkey
- Citizenship: Turkey
- Education: Istanbul University
- Occupation: Novelist

Leyla Erbil (12 January 1931 – 19 July 2013) was a Turkish writer. She was one of the leading female contemporary writers of Turkey, author of six novels, three collections of short stories and a book of essays. She was the first Turkish female writer to be nominated for a Nobel Prize in Literature by PEN International in 2002. Erbil was a co-founder of the Union of Turkish Artists and the Writers Syndicate of Turkey.

== Personal life ==
A second child in a family with three children, Leylâ Erbil was born on 12 January 1931 in Istanbul, Turkey, to Emine Huriye Hanim and Hasan Tahsin. She studied at the Kadıköy Girls School and attended the Department of English Language and Literature of Istanbul University. She married her first husband, Aytek Şay, in 1951 after her first year of university. The marriage, which did not last long, caused Erbil to take a break from her education; she returned to university shortly after they divorced. She met her second husband, Mehmet Erbil, while working as a secretary and translator at Scandinavian Airlines in 1953, and took yet another break from her education during her last year. They wed after a few short months, and she did not resume her education afterwards. The couple moved to İzmir, where in 1960 Leyla Erbil gave birth to her only daughter, Fatoş Erbil-Pınar. She later returned to live in Istanbul.

Erbil was diagnosed with Langerhans cell histiocytosis in 2005, and for eight years, she battled courageously with her illness. In 2013, however, she lost the battle. She died on 19 July 2013, at the age of 82 at Istanbul Hospital where she was being treated for liver failure and respiratory problems, which were side effects of her illness.

== Organizational affiliations and activism ==
In the 1960s she was involved in the activities and worked in the Office of Arts and Culture of the Workers Party of Turkey, which was the most influential socialist party at the time, until it has merged with the Communist Party of Turkey in 1988 and ceased to exist as an independent party. Erbil became one of the few founding members of the Union of Turkish Artists in 1970. Four years later, in 1974, she became a founder member of the Writers Syndicate of Turkey. As a founding member, she prepared the constitution for the syndicate with her friends. At this time, she was also a member of the PEN Writers Association.

In 1999, Erbil became a deputy candidate for the Freedom and Solidarity Party (ÖDP). After some disagreements with its ideals, Erbil left the party.

== Literary career ==
She began writing stories while working as a secretary and translator. Her first poetry was published in 1945, but she is known for her stories, which began to appear in various journals in the 1950s. Her stories are usually based on emotional and sociological conflicts of individuals and the society. Whether it is a love story or the story of a family or about the political and social developments of society, she usually presents contradictory states and situations. Breaking away from the traditional techniques of Turkish literature and the syntax of the Turkish language, Erbil developed a unique style and used different wordings of Turkish, taking inspiration from the teachings of Sigmund Freud. She searched for a new narrative voice to depict the existential struggles of the modern individual who clashes with society. Erbil is noted for her ability to observe individuals using different societal perspectives, and her stories are characterized by efforts to depict the multiple dimensions of reality.

Her first story Hallaç (Carder) came out in 1961. Her first novel Tuhaf bir Kadın (A Strange Woman), published in 1971, became a masterpiece. Casting a resolute female gaze over a male world and penned with an innovative language, the book's critical success earned Erbil comparisons with Virginia Woolf. The novel was considered a pioneer, as for the first time in Turkish literature it was confronting issues such as virginity, incest and sexual and physical abuse. A Strange Woman was published at a time when the word feminism had not yet entered the Turkish vocabulary and mindset; hence feminists consider the novel to be a first of its kind. Leyla Erbil made important headway in Turkish literature with the distinctive style and format she developed in this novel, paving the way for others to follow.

Another short story collection, Gecede (At Night) would reinforce her reputation as a majestic narrator of the female condition. Her following novels, Karanlığın Günü (The Day of Darkness) and Mektup Aşkları (Love letters) came during the dark era of the 80s, in 1985 and 1988 respectively. She dedicated the 90s to writing essays, before releasing in 2001 Cüce (Dwarf), another of her masterpieces replete with dark humour.

Kalan (The Remaining), published in 2011, related the tragedy of Istanbul's multicultural communities through the eyes of its cosmopolitan and rebellious female protagonist Lahzen.

In 2002, Erbil was nominated as a candidate for the Nobel Prize in Literature by the PEN Writers Association, making her the first Turkish woman to be nominated for the prize in that category.

Her works have been translated into English, French, and German languages. She was among the contributors of the literary magazine Papirüs which was edited by Cemal Süreya.

== Bibliography ==
Pieces written by Leyla Erbil
Year	Name	Translated name	Type
1961	Hallaç	Carder (alt. translation: Cotton Fluffer)	Short stories
1968	Gecede	At Night	Short stories
1971	Tuhaf Bir Kadın	A Strange Woman	Novel
1977	Eski Sevgili	Old Love	Short stories
1985	Karanlığın Günü	The Day of Darkness	Novel
1988	Mektup Aşkları	Love Letters	Novel
1998	Zihin Kuşları	Birds of the Mind	Essays
2001	Cüce	Dwarf	Novel
2005	Üç Başlı Ejderha	Three-Headed Dragon	Novel
2011	Kalan	The Remaining	Novel
2013	Tuhaf Bir Erkek	A Strange Man	Novel
