= Yeni Dergi =

Cultural magazine in Turkey (1964-1975)

- Editor-in-chief: Memet Fuat
- Categories: Cultural magazine
- Frequency: Monthly
- Founder: Memet Fuat
- Founded: 1964
- First issue: October 1964
- Final issue: 1975
- Country: Turkey
- Based in: Istanbul
- Language: Turkish

Yeni Dergi (Turkish: The New Magazine) was a monthly cultural magazine published in Istanbul, Turkey, between 1964 and 1975. The magazine featured both translations and original texts from different fields.

== History and profile ==
Yeni Dergi was first published in October 1964. Its publisher was De Publications, which was owned by Memet Fuat, a Turkish author, and the stated aim of the magazine was to enrich the knowledge base of the Turkish intellectuals. Memet Fuat was also the editor-in-chief of the magazine, which mostly featured translations of modernist literary work and contemporary critical theory from Western sources. The latter group of texts were about philosophy, aesthetics, politics, and psychology. The most frequent topics covered were existentialism and Marxist criticism. The magazine also published thematic issues, two of which were concerned with the work of Herbert Marcuse and Prague Spring. From 1969, Yeni Dergi contained fewer translated texts, and focused on original Turkish works. One of its leading contributors was Tomris Uyar. Conservative poet Cahit Zarifoğlu published articles in the magazine until 1971.

Yeni Dergi folded in 1975 after publishing a total of one hundred twenty-eight issue.
