= Sennur Sezer =

Turkish poet and literary person (1943–2015)

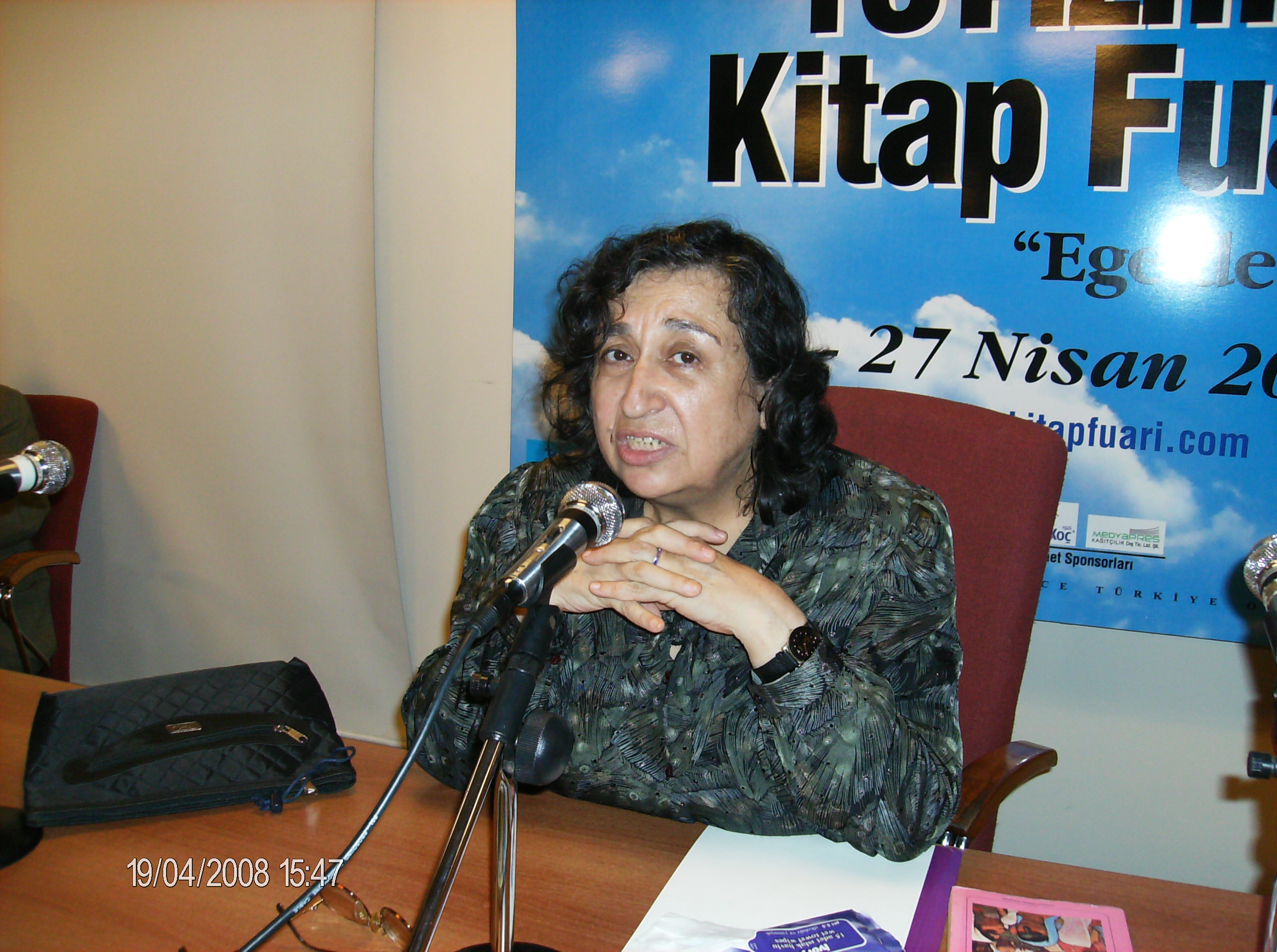
- Born: 12 June 1943; Eskişehir
- Died: 7 October 2015 (72 years old)
- Occupations: Poet, writer
- Writing career
- Period: Republic Era Turkish Literature
- Notable work: Gecekondu (1964) (debut)

Sennur Sezer (12 June 1943, Eskişehir – 7 October 2015, İstanbul) was a Turkish poet and documentary writer.

Her real name is Sennur Fatma Çelik. Her first poem was published in 1958 and her first book Gecekondu in 1964. She wrote many screenplays, especially for Turkish cinema under her real name as well as under a pseudonym and contributed to the writing of various encyclopedias and anthologies. As one of the founding members of the Labour party she supported all kinds of actions by women, workers and other groups of people seeking their rights and supported the actions taken by them such as strikes. She is the spouse of writer Adnan Özyalçıner whom she married in 1967.

== Life ==
She was born on 12 June 1943 in Eskişehir. She finished her primary education at Kadımehmet Primary School in 1953 and finished her middleschool education at Kasımpaşa middleschool in 1956. She published her first poem while she was a highschool student at Istanbul Girls High School in 1958. In 1959 she left during her second year studies at the Istanbul Girls High School and started to work at the Taşkızak Naval Shipyard. Her first book of poetry, Gecekondu, was published in 1964.

In 1965 she became an editor at Varlık Publishers, and published her second book of poems Yasak in 1966. She married Adnan Özyalçıner in 1967; they had two children. 1977’.

She wrote the lyrics Buruk Acı which was featured in the movie of the same name starring Türkan Şoray, Tanju Gürsu, and Muzaffer Tema as leads. The movie was based on the book written by Adnan Özyalçıner.

Until 1982 she worked as an editor and article writer at various publishing houses and encyclopedias.

Beginning with Günlük Evrensel and Evrensel Kültür she wrote in various magazines and newspapers, and continued to prepare the narratives for documentaries until Sezer died on 7 October 2015.

== Her poetry ==
Sezer's restless youth and the hardships she faced during that time reflect negatively upon her poems about family relations.

== Legacy ==
The Sennur Sezer awards are named after her.

== Poetry books ==
- Gecekondu (1964)
- Yasak (1966)
- Direnç (1977)
- Sesimi Arıyorum (1982)
- Kimlik Kartı (ilk üç kitap, 1983)
- Bu Resimde Kimler Var (1986)
- Afiş (1991)
- Kirlenmiş Kağıtlar (1999)
- Bir Annenin Notları (Seçme Şiirler 2002)
- Dilsiz Dengbej (2001)
- Akşam Haberleri (2006)
- İzi Kalsın (2011)

== Other works ==
- Keloğlan ile Köse (Story, with Adnan Özyalçıner)
- Şiir Gündemi (trials 1995)
- İstanbul'un Taşı-Toprağı Altın (İstanbul folklore together with Adnan Özyalçıner ) (1995)
- Anadolu'dan Öyküler (with Adnan Özyalçıner) (1995)
- Pencereden Bakan Çocuk (Çocuklara şiirler) (1995)
- Türk Safosu Mihri Hatun (Documentary scenario 1997)
- Osmanlı'da Fal ve Falnameler (1998)
- Ekmek Kavgası / Emek Öyküleri 1 (story selection together with Adnan Özyalçıner) (1998)
- Grev Bildirisi / Emek Öyküleri 2 (story selection together with Adnan Özyalçıner) (1998)
- Motorize Köleler/Emek Öyküleri 3 (story selection together with Adnan Özyalçıner) (1999)
- Dokumacının Ölümü /Emek Öyküleri 4 (Östory selection together with Adnan Özyalçıner) (1999)
- Hasır Ören Padişah (Masal, 1999)
- Az Masraflı ve Kolay Yemekler (2001)
- Nazım, Dünya ve Biz ( review, with Şükran Kurdakul 2002)
- ''Masal Evi (Adnan Özyalçıner ile birlikte)(2003)
- Bir Zamanların İstanbul'u (with Adnan Özyalçıner) (2005)
- Binbir Gece Masalları (Illustrated by Mustafa Delioğlu) (2006)
- Şahmaran (halk öyküsü 2007)
- '68'in Edebiyatı, Edebiyatın 68'i (inceleme ve seçki, 2008)
- Öyküleriyle İstanbul Anıtları (Volume 2, with Adnan Özyalçıner, 2010)

== Awards ==
- 1980 Kadınların Sesi Dergisi’nin 8 Mart Ödülü (Kadınlara yönelik yazıları ve şiirleri için)
- 1987 Halil Kocagöz Şiir Ödülü (Bu Resimde Kimler Var ile)
- 1990 Sıtkı Dost Çocuk Edebiyatı Ödülü (Keloğlan İle Köse ile)
- 1998 Pir Sultan Abdal Dernekleri Edebiyat Ödülü (Şiiri alanlara taşıdığı için)
- 2000 Oğuzkaan Koleji Şiir Ustaları Ödülü
- 2000 Yunus Nadi Şiir Ödülü (Kirlenmiş Kağıtlar ile)
- 2009 (Ş.Avni Ölez Şiir Emeği Ödülü)
- 2012 PEN Türkiye Şiir Ödülü
