= Mîna Urgan =

Turkish academic (1915–2000)

Mînâ Urgan
- Born: Mîna Urgan; 14 May 1915; Istanbul, Ottoman Empire
- Died: 15 June 2000 (aged 85); Istanbul, Turkey
- Education: Lycée Notre Dame de Sion Istanbul; Arnavutköy Girls' College (Robert College; Istanbul University
- Occupations: Academic, translator, writer and politician
- Children: 2

Mîna Urgan (14 May 1915 – 15 June 2000) was a Turkish academic, translator, author and socialist politician.

== Selected filmography ==
- Istanbul Sokaklarında (1931)
- Karım Beni Aldatırsa (1932)
- Kaçakçılar (1933)
- Aysel Bataklı Damın Kızı (1934)
- Aysel Bataklı Damın Kızı (1935)
- Nasreddin Hoca Düğünde (1940)
- Nasreddin Hoca Düğünde (1943)
- Yara (1947)
- Karaoğlan Camoka'nın intikamı (1966)

== Early life ==
Mîna Urgan was born to poet Tahsin Nahit and his wife Şefika in Istanbul on 14 May 1916. To another source, she was born on 1 May 1915. Her father died as she was three years old, and her mother made a second marriage with Falih Rıfkı Atay, a renowned journalist and writer. As the Surname Law was enacted in Turkey in 1934, her stepfather's close friend, the renowned author Necip Fazıl Kısakürek, suggested her the family name Urgan (literally "rope"), ironically stating that "it would match her because the socialist-minded young girl would be hanged one day anyway".

She was schooled in Lycée Notre Dame de Sion Istanbul, and finished the high school in the Arnavutköy Girls' College (Robert College). She was inspired by her stepfather Atay and enjoyed to be in his circle of people of letters and artists. She was one of the first female skiers and swimmers in Turkey. She graduated from Istanbul University studying French Philology. After doctorate studies in English literature, she continued her post-doctoral studies in the same university's School of English Philology. In 1949, she became an associate professor with her thesis "Harlequins in the era of Elizabeth I of England theater". She was appointed professor at the same faculty in 1960. She retired in 1977.

== Writing career ==
She translated works of Thomas Malory (c. 1415–18 – 1471), Henry Fielding (1707–1754), Honoré de Balzac (1799–1850), Aldous Huxley (1894–1963), Graham Greene (1904–1991), William Golding (1911–1993), John Galsworthy (1867–1933) and Shakespeare (1564–1616) into Turkish. Urgan gained fame with her autobiography Bir Dinozorun Anıları ("Memoirs of a Dinosaur"). The 1998 published book remained several weeks on the best seller list. Upon this success, she wrote another autobiography Bir Dinozorun Gezileri ("Travels of a Dinosaur"), which was published in 1999.

== In politics ==
Urgan entered politics in 1960. She was one of the charter members of the Workers Party of Turkey (TİP) and the Freedom and Solidarity Party (ÖDP). In the 1999 general elections, she ran for a seat in the parliament from the ÖDP. However, she did not reach her goal because her party failed to exceed the 10 percent threshold for parliamentary representation.

== Private life ==
Urgan was married to poet and actor Cahit Irgat (1916–1971). The couple were divorced later. She was mother of a son Mustafa Irgat (1950–1995), a poet and painter, and a daughter Zeynep Irgat, an actress. She died at the age of 84 in Istanbul on 15 June 2000. She was interred at Aşiyan Asri Cemetery following a memorial ceremony at the Istanbul headquarters of ÖDP, where the anthem of the international socialism The Internationale was played, a marching through the entire İstiklal Avenue was performed, and the religious funeral at Teşvikiye Mosque attended by renowned authors and artists.

== Awards ==
She was honored with the "Golden Book Award" in 1993. For her work Virginia Woolf, she received the "Sedat Simavi Literature Award" in 1995, and the "Association of People of Letters Honor Award" in 1996.

== Works ==
She translated the following books into Turkish:

1. Herman Melville: Moby Dick
2. Thomas More: Utopia (co-translated with Vedat Günyol, Sabahattin Eyuboğlu)
3. Thomas Malory: Arthur'un Ölümü ("Death of Arthur")
4. Henry Fielding: Tom Jones
5. Graham Greene: Meselenin Kalbi ("The Heart of the Matter")
6. Aldous Huxley: Ses Sese Karşı ("Point Counter Point")
7. William Golding: Sineklerin Tanrısı ("Lord of the Flies")
8. Clive Bell: Uygarlık ("Civilization") (co translated with Melih Cevdet Anday and Vedat Günyol)

The following are her own books. (Mostly biography):

1. Macbeth (1965)
2. Shakespeare ve Hamlet ("Shakespeare and Hamlet") (1984)
3. İngiliz Edebiyatı Tarihi ("History of English Literature") (5 volumes, 1986–1993)
4. Virginia Woolf (1995)
5. D. H. Lawrence (1997)
6. Edebiyatta Ütopya kavramı ve Thomas More ("Concept of utopia in literature and Thomas More")
7. Bir Dinozorun Anıları ("Memoirs of a Dinosaur", autobiography) (1998)
8. Bir Dinozorun Gezileri ("Travels of a Dinosaur", autobiography) )1999)
