= Gülten Akın =

Turkish poet (1933–2015)

Gülten Akın (23 January 1933 – 4 November 2015) was a female Turkish poet. Her poetry is considered to be culturally significant to Turkey.

Akin was born in 1933 in Yozgat, Turkey. She attended Beşiktaş Atatürk Anatolian High School and graduated from Ankara University Law School in 1955. She married her husband Yaşar Cankoçak in 1956, with whom she had five children. Because of her husband's position as the governor of various provincial districts in Turkey, she moved around several provinces of Turkey, working as a lawyer, assistant lawyer and teacher in many of them. In 1972, Akın and her family settled in Ankara, where she worked at the Turkish Language Association, the regulatory body of the Turkish language, and became a member of the Editorial Team at the Ministry of Culture. She worked for the reestablishment of free and democratic non-governmental organizations. She served as a founder and/or manager at several such Turkish organizations, such as the Human Rights Association, Halkevleri (community centers) and the Language Association (Dil Derneği).

Akın's first published poem appeared in the newspaper Son Haber in 1951. She subsequently appeared in several magazines, such as Hisar, Varlık, Yeditepe, Türk Dili and Mülkiye. While her early poems were about nature, love, separation, and yearning, her later poems were dominated by social issues.

Her poems are inspired a great deal by folklore. In the compilation book of her analytical writings on poetry, Şiiri Düzde Kuşatmak ("Surrounding Poetry with Simplicity"), Akın expressed her desire to get down to the level of the general populace in her poems, saying that she wanted to "put into words and writing the already-existing essence and form that exists among the people, and while promoting the poem, promoting the improvement of the lives and lifestyles of the people." Her poems have been translated into many languages, and more than 40 of her poems have been composed into songs. One of these songs is the 1993 "Deli Kızın Türküsü" (English: Crazy Girl's Ballad) by Sezen Aksu, which was also the title of the album it appeared on.

Akın also authored short plays.

Milliyet named her as having been the most influential Turkish poet since Fazıl Hüsnü Dağlarca.

== Poetic works ==
- Rüzgar Saati (Hour of the Wind) (1956)
- Kestim Kara Saçlarımı (I Cut My Black Hair) (1960)
- Sığda (In the Shallow) (1964)
- Kırmızı Karanfil (Red Clove) (1971)
- Maraş'ın ve Ökkeş'in Destanı (The Epic of Maraş and Ökkeş) (1972)
- Ağıtlar ve Türküler (Laments and Odes) (1976)
- Seyran Destanı (Epic of Seyran) (1979)
- İlahiler (Hymns) (1983)
- Sevda Kalıcıdır (Love Stays Forever) (1991)
- Sonra İşte Yaşlandım (Then I Aged) (1995)
- Sessiz Arka Bahçeler (Silent Back Gardens) (1998)
- Uzak Bir Kıyıda (On A Far Coast) (2003)

== Poems turned into songs ==
- Büyü Yavrum:
  - by Grup Yorum, 1987
  - by Edip Akbayram and Kemal Sahir Gürel, 1988
- Deli Kızın Türküsü:
  - by Sezen Aksu, 1993

== Awards ==
Akın has received many awards; some of them are:

- 1955 - Varlık poetry contest, 1st place
- 1964 - Turkish Language Association poetry contest
- 1972 - Turkish Radio and Television Corporation Artistic Awards Contest, Achievement Award
- 1976 - Yeditepe (magazine) poetry award
- 1991 - Halil Kocagöz Poetry Awards Award
- 1992 - Sedat Simavi Literature Award
- 1999 - Akdeniz Golden Orange Poetry Award
- 2003 - Dünya (newspaper) Book of the Year Award
- 2008 - Erdal Öz Literature Award
