= Seyhan Erözçelik =

Turkish poet

- Born: 13 March 1962; Bartın, Turkey
- Died: 24 August 2011 (aged 49); Istanbul, Turkey
- Occupation: Poet

Seyhan Erözçelik (13 March 1962 – 24 August 2011) was a Turkish poet.

== Biography ==
He was born in 1962 in Bartın, Turkey, a town in the Black Sea region. He studied psychology at Boğazici University and Oriental languages at Istanbul University. In 1986, he co-founded the Şiir Atı publishing house, which published over forty titles in the 1980s. He was a member of the Turkish PEN Center and Writer's Syndicate of Turkey.

His first poem, "Düştanbul" (Dreamstanbul), was published in 1982 and followed by a number of collections. He had also written poems in the Bartin dialect and in other Turkic languages, and had brought a modern approach to the classical Ottoman rhyme, aruz, in his book Kara Yazılı Meşkler (Tunes Written on the Snow, 2003). He had published a critical essay on the modern mystical poet Asaf Halet Çelebi, collected works of the forgotten poet Halit Asım, and translated the poetry of Osip Mandelstam and C. P. Cavafy into Turkish. He was awarded the Yunus Nadi Prize in 1991, the Behcet Necatigil Poetry Prize in 2004, and the Dionysos Prize in 2005.

== Bibliography ==
- Yeis ile Tabanca (Despair and Pistol, 1986)
- Hayal Kumpanyası (The Troop of Imagine, 1990)
- Kır Ağı (Hoarfrost, 1991)
- Gül ve Telve (Rosestrikes and Coffee Grinds, 1997)
- Şehir'de Sansar Var! (There is a Marten in Town!, 1999)
- Yeis (Despair, 2002)
- Kitaplar (Books, 2003, his collected poems including his previously unpublished poetry books Kitap, Bitti. (The Book is Over!) ve Kara Yazılı Meşkler (Tunes Written on the Snow))
- Yağmur Taşı (The Rainstone, 2004)
- Vâridik Yoğidik (Once We Were, We Weren't, 2006)
- Pentimento (Pentimento, 2011)

=== Translations ===
Seyhan Erözçelik's poetry has been translated into English by Murat Nemet-Nejat. Nemet-Nejat's translations were published in several American literary journals such as Bombay Gin, Talisman and Subtropics, as well as the online journals Jacket and Words Without Borders In 2010, Nemet-Nejat's English translation of Gül ve Telve came out from Talisman House. A recent piece by Efe Murad on Seyhan Erözçelik's semantic combinations and poetic syntax in his works came out in "Jacket".

- Rosestrikes and Coffee Grinds, translated by Murat Nemet-Nejat (Talisman House, 2010)

== External References ==
- For Seyhan Erozcelik's book in English Rosestrikes and Coffee Grinds
- A selection from his poetry in English published in Jacket 34
- Another poem by Erözçelik published online in Words Without Borders
