= Nergisî =

Ottoman writer (c. 1580 – 1635)

Nergisî, fully known as Nergiszade Mehmed Efendi (c. 1580 – 1635), was an Ottoman writer, calligrapher and official of the 17th century. He is considered to be one of the best writers of inşa (stylistic prose) in Ottoman literature.

== Education and career ==
Nergisî was born c. 1580 in Saraybosna (modern-day Sarajevo) in Ottoman Bosnia. His date of birth has not been documented clearly, but literary historians have discerned from his works that he must have been born between 1580 and 1585. After receiving his basic education in Saraybosna, he went to Constantinople, attending madrasa classes delivered by Kafzade Feyzullah Efendi, who taught him the art of calligraphy in the thuluth, taliq and naskh styles. He eventually had to drop out of education due to the financial difficulties caused by the death of his father, instead becoming an apprentice of Feyzullah Efendi and ending up as a müderris initially, and assisting with the tasks of kadis (judges). Eventually he became a kadi himself and served as the kadi in various towns in Rumelia (the modern-day Balkans) across the years, namely Gabela, Çaniçe, Mostar, Yenipazar, Elbasan, Banaluka and Manastır.

Nergisî spent the majority of his life in debt and moving around Rumelia, feeling unappreciated for his work, as is evident from his correspondence with other writers. He finally achieved the appreciation of Sultan Murad IV in the 1630s, with the Sultan appointing him as the official chronicler (vak'anüvis) for the expedition to capture Revan in 1635. After having set off from the capital to get to the front, Nergisî fell from his horse into a swamp near Gebze, and died in March/April 1635.

== Works ==
His magnum opus is Hamse-i Nergisî. A hamse is a collection of five major works of verse by an author, his hamse is notable as the only such work in prose form in Ottoman literature. It is unclear when the work was exactly collated as the first mention of a hamse was a century after Nergisî's death, however twelve manuscripts do survive with this title. The hamse consists of original works as well as translations into Ottoman Turkish.

The most notable part of the collection is Nihâlistân ("The Sapling Garden"), of which he composed two iterations. The second version is a collection of twenty-five short stories that are divided into five themes (generosity, love, various events, paying for one's deeds and repentance), each theme comprising a "nihal" ("sapling").

Nergisî's work is characterised by a flowery and verbose style, rich in imagery and complex in phrasing, with a high number of Arabic and Persian loanwords. The interplay of these factors prevented the readers' understanding of his work. After his death, his work was initially regarded some of the finest examples of Ottoman literature and widely emulated. This changed with the Tanzimat, whereby his style became criticised as too inaccessible and "unnatural". Namık Kemal commented that Saadi Shirazi's Gulistan was easier to understand then Nergisî's work, despite the former having been written in Persian. Büyük Larousse notes that "despite being very cultured with a broad imagination, he just could not be understood due to his excesses".

== English translation ==
Gisela Prochazka-Eisl has translated two stories ("The Conscientious Thief" and "A dog's testimony on the day of judgment") from the second iteration of the Nihâlistân-part of the Hamse-i Nergisî into English.
