= Adnan Özyalçıner =

Turkish author

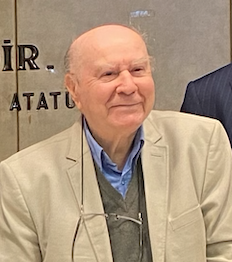
- Born: 18 February 1934 (age 91); Istanbul, Turkey
- Occupation: Writer, journalist
- Period: Republic era of Turkish literature
- Literary movement: Short story, novel, children's literature, essay
- Notable works: Panayır (debut)
- Spouse: Sennur Sezer (m. 1967; who died in 2015)

Adnan Çelik (born 1934 in İstanbul) is a Turkish author known as Adnan Özyalçıner.

His real name is Adnan Çelik. He is the son of Ayşe Hanım and weaver Ahmet Nuri Özyalçıner. He was born and raised in Istanbul to a family with Bosniak roots. He graduated from İstanbul Boys Highschool and studied Turkology at the Literature Faculty of İstanbul University. In 1967 he married poet Sennur Sezer. He worked more than 20 years as a proofreader at the Cumhuriyet newspaper. From 1974 to 1989 he was the secretary general of the Turkish Writers' Union. In 1981 he was brought to the position of Vice President of YAZKO. He worked as the editor-in-chief of literary magazines, including Yazko Literature, Yazko Translation and Hürriyet Gösteri.

== Works ==
=== Stories ===
A compilation of the first four-story books by the author, thinking of the youth, was published by Gendaş Publications in 1991 with the title Taş. The author's own selected stories from the books from Panayır till Sağanak was published by Dünya Publications in 2003.

- Panayır (1960)
- Sur (1963)
- Yağma (1971)
- Gözleri Bağlı Adam (1977)
- Cambazlar Savaşı Yitirdi (1991)
- Alaycı Öyküler (1991)
- Sağanak (1993) (First published in 1972 under the title Yıkım Günleri. In the new edition he added two new stories.)
- Yazdan Kalma Bir Gün (1999)
- Ayak İzleri (2000) (Interview Stories)
- Aradakiler (2001)
- İç (2008) (In collaboration with Aslı Solakoğlu)
- Alandaki Park (2014)

=== Children's books ===
- Kırmızı Çini Kase (1976)
- Garip Nasıl Okuyacak (1977)
- Ölümsüzleşen Bahçe (1980)
- Sabırtaşı Çatladı (1980)
- Anıtların Öyküleri (1981)
- Devlet Kuşu (1988)
- Anadolu'dan Öyküler (with Sennur Sezer 1995)
- Keloğlan ile Köse (with Sennur Sezer1989)
- Tarihten Öyküler (2003)
- Masal Evi (with Sennur Sezer 2005)
- Keloğlan Bir Gün (2008)
- Masal Okuyorum (Compilation, with Sennur Sezer 2012)

=== Novels ===
- IV. Murad ve Mirgün Bahçeleri (1997) (in later editions the name was changed to Güç ve Güzellik)

=== Analysis ===
- Tarihin Işıldağı (1989)
- İstanbul'un Taşı Toprağı Altın, İstanbul Yaşamı ve Folkloru (with Sennur Sezer, 1995)
- Üç Dinin Başkenti İstanbul (2003)
- Edebiyatın Ağır İşçisi Cevdet Kudret (Der., 2007)
- Edebiyatın Kırk Ayaklı Karıncası: Asım Bezirci (Haz., 2009)
- Gidelim Kağıthaneye (with Sennur Sezer, 2010)
- Benim Taşlıtarlam, İstanbulum 2 (with Adnan Özer, 2010)
- Karagümrüklü Yıllar, İstanbulum 3 (2010)
- Öyküleriyle İstanbul Anıtları (with Sennur Sezer, 2010)

=== Folk Stories ===
- Âşık Garip ile Şahsenem (2007)

=== Compilations ===
- Emek Öyküleri (with Sennur Sezer, 1999)
- Halk Şiirinden Seçmeler (with Sennur Sezer, 2007)

== Awards ==
- 1964 Sait Faik Hikâye Armağanı (Sur)
- 1972 Turkish Language Association Story Award (Yağma)
- 1978 Sait Faik Hikâye Armağanı (Gözleri Bağlı Adam)
- 1990 Sıtkı Dost Children's Literature Award (Keloğllan ile Köse)
- 1991 Haldun Taner Öykü Award (Cambazlar Savaşı Yitirdi)
- 1980 Contemporary Journalists Journalist of the Year
- 1993 Turkish Journalists Association Awards
