= Radi Dikici =

Turkish writer (1937–2021)

Radi Dikici (26 April 1937 – 26 January 2021) was a Turkish writer known for his works in the history of the Roman and Byzantine empires. He studied political science at Ankara University and worked as an auditor, later as an administrator in the industry.

== Works ==
=== Non-fiction ===
In Turkish

- This City Called Istanbul – The Ottoman's Istanbul Adventure 1453-1924 (2002)
- This Byzantium of Ours: Byzantium 330-1453 (2007)
- The History of the Byzantine Empire: Byzantium 330-1453 (2013)
- Four Istanbul (2014)
- Understanding Byzantium (2016)
- Müzeyyen Senar's Legend (2017)

In English

- Empress Theodora (Everest Yayınları, 2011)
- Four Istanbuls (2015)
- The History of the Byzantine Empire: Byzantium 330-1453 (January 2016)

=== Fiction ===
In Turkish

- Theodora (Remzi Kitabevi, 2009, ISBN 9789751413482)
- Constantine the Great, Helena and Fausta (2011)
- Bizans Imparatoru Büyük Theodosius [Byzantine Emperor Thedosius the Great] (Remzi Kitabevi, 2013, ISBN 9789751415769)
- Şans, Zafer ve... Emperor Heraclius (2015)

In English

- Empress Theodora (Everest Yayinlari, 2011, ISBN 9789752898356)
