= Asım Bezirci =

Turkish critic, writer and poet

Asım Bezirci (Erzincan, 1927 – Sivas, 2 July 1993) was a Turkish critic, writer and poet. He was killed, along with 34 others, during the Sivas massacre in Sivas, Turkey when a group of Islamists set fire to the hotel where the victims had gathered for the Pir Sultan Abdal festival.

== See also ==
- List of Turkish writers
- List of massacres in Turkey
