= Sezai Karakoç =

Turkish poet (1933–2021)

- Born: Ahmet Sezai Karakoç; 22 January 1933; Ergani, Diyarbakır, Turkey
- Died: 16 November 2021 (aged 88); Fatih, Istanbul, Turkey
- Occupations: Poet, writer, thinker, community leader
- Notable work: Monna Rosa (poem)

Ahmet Sezai Karakoç (22 January 1933 – 16 November 2021) was a Turkish writer, thinker, community leader, and poet.

== Biography ==
Karakoç graduated from the Faculty of Political Science at Ankara University and worked in the finance sector for many years. He was one of the pioneers of Turkish literature who aimed at bridging traditional Islamic beliefs and modern poetic techniques.

He sees three essential elements for a poet. These three elements he calls Peer Gynt’s triangle, according to Karakoç, exists in Henrik Ibsen’s play, Peer Gynt. These three elements are: Poet must be himself. To be himself a poet must transform. Second element: a poet must be self content. Poet must love his art while being transformed by it. Thirdly, to be self-content, one must feel joy. This joy comes not from living but from letting live.

Karakoç was among the contributors of the literary magazine Papirüs which was edited by Cemal Süreya.

== Bibliography ==
Poems

- "Şiirler I" (Monna Rosa)
- "Şiirler II" (Şahdamar-Körfez-Sesler)
- "Şiirler III" (Hızırla Kırk Saat)
- "Şiirler IV" (Taha'nın Kitabı, Gül Muştusu)
- "Şiirler V" (Zamana Adanmış Sözler)
- "Şiirler VI" (Ayinler/Çeşmeler)
- "Şiirler VII" (Leylâ ile Mecnun)
- "Şiirler VIII" (Ateş Dansı)
- "Şiirler IX" (Alınyazısı Saati)
- "Gün Doğmadan" (Toplu Şiirler)

Interviews

- "Tarihin Yol Ağzında"
- "Unutuş ve Hatırlayış"
- "Çıkış Yolu I"
- "Çıkış Yolu II"
- "Çıkış Yolu III"

- "Körfez" (Gulf, 1959)
- "Sesler" (Voices, 1968)
- "Zamana Adanmış Sözler" (Words Dedicated to Time, 1970)
- "Ayinler" (Rites, 1977)

== See also ==
- List of contemporary Turkish poets
