= Refik Durbaş =

Turkish poet (1944–2018)

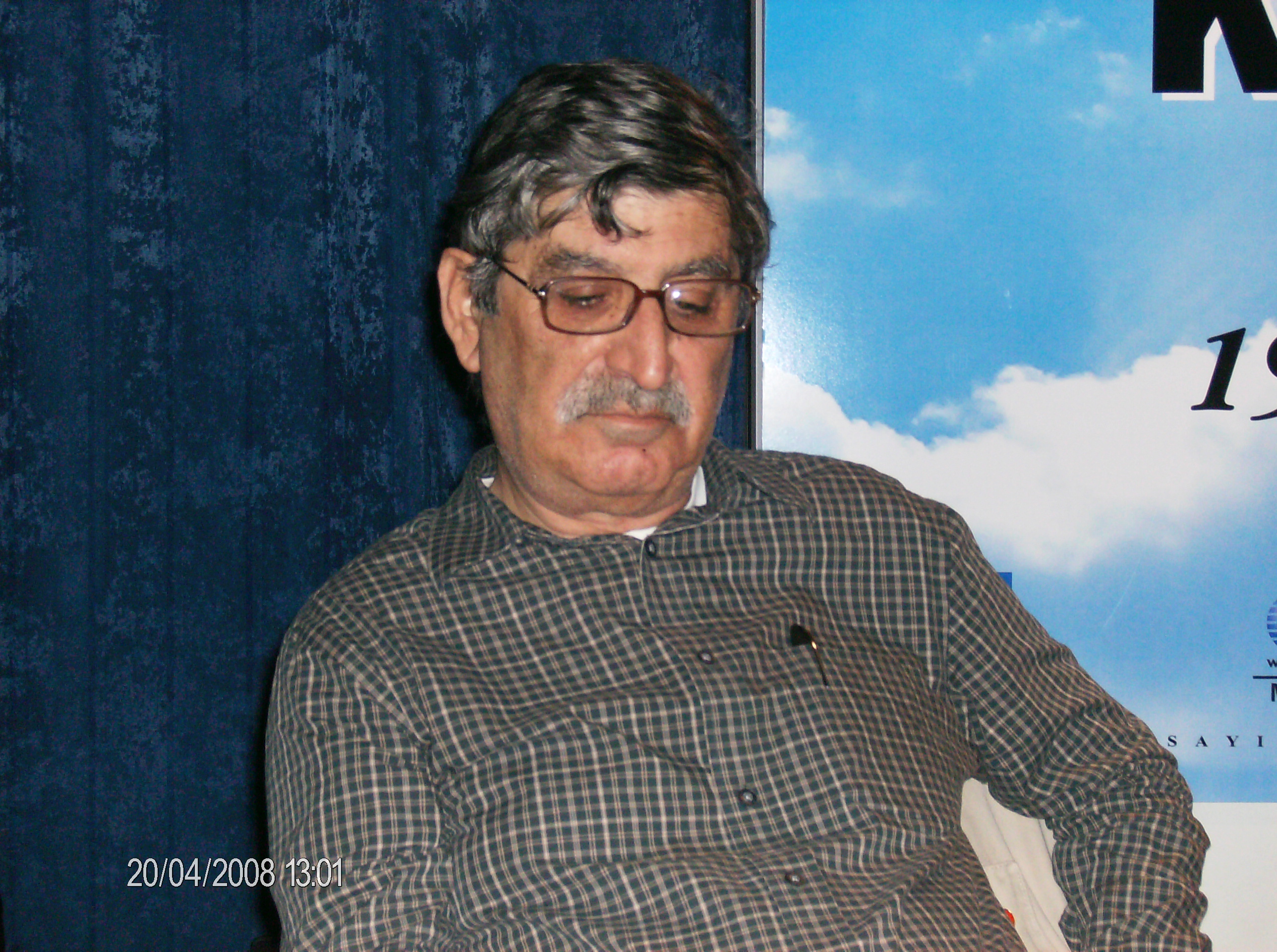
- Born: 10 February 1944
- Died: 1 December 2018 (aged 74)
- Citizenship: Turkey
- Education: Istanbul University Faculty of Literature
- Occupations: Poet, journalist, writer

Refik Durbaş (10 February 1944 in Pasinler – 1 December 2018 in Istanbul), Turkish poet, journalist and writer.

== Life ==
He was born in Erzurums Pasinler district. Graduated High School in İzmir. He left Istanbul University Literature Faculty Turkish language and literature department before completion. He worked different jobs between 1965 and 1968. He worked at Yeni İstanbul and Cumhuriyet newspapers as a proofreader.

His first poem was published in the İzmir in the Ege Ekspres newspapers art section. His poems in magazines like Devinim, Gösteri, Sanat Olayı, Soyut, Papirüs garnered him significant attention.Together with his friends, between 1962 and 1964 he published the Evrim magazine and in 1967 the Alan 67 magazine. In 1971 he gathered his first poems in the poetry book by the name of Kuş Tufanı. Between 1972 and 1974 he was the chief of the editorial office of Yeni A magazine. He prepared the art sections in newspapers. In 1992 he retired from Cumhuriyet newspaper. He continued work as a column writer for various newspapers.

Starting with the İkinci Yeni movement his style of poetry, over time, was directed towards public issues. With his own unique voice and metaphors, he was sharpening his demeanor from the beginning wrote poems that gave importance to form as much as meaning. He was known as the poet who reflected the world of bazaars, working girls, market places and tea houses. In his poetry, he also used old words skillfully interspersed in colloquial speech.

Durbaş, who was treated for lung cancer and was a dialysis patient on died on 1 December 2018 after being taken to the intensive care unit at Medeniyet University Hospital due to his deteriorating health condition. He was buried in Ümraniye Hekimbaşı Cemetery after the funeral ceremony held at Erenköy Galip Paşa Mosque on 2 December 2018.

== Works ==
=== Poems ===
- Kuş Tufanı (1971)
- Hücremde Ayışığı (1974)
- Çırak Aranıyor (1978)
- İkinci Baskı (1979)
- Çaylar Şirketten (1980)
- Denizler Sincabı (poems for kids, 1982)
- Kırmızı Kanatlı Kartal (poems for kids, 1982)
- Nereye Uçar Gökyüzü (1983)
- Siyah Bir Acıda (1984)
- Bir Umuttan Bir Sevinçten (1984, compiled poems 1)
- Yeni Bir Defter-Şiirler-Meçhul Bir Aşk (1985)
- Adresi Uçurum (1986, compiled poems 2)
- Geçti mi Geçen Günler (1989)
- Menzil (1992)
- Kimse Hatırlamıyor (1994, compiled poems 1)
- Nereye Uçar Gökyüzü (1994, compiled poems 2)
- İki Sevda Arasında Kara Sevda (1994)
- Tilki Tilki Saat Kaç (1995)
- Düşler Şairi (1997)
- İstanbul Hatırası (1998)
- Şayeste (2018)

=== Journalistic Reports ===
- Ahmet Arif Anlatıyor: Kalbim Dinamit Kuyusu (1990)

=== Analysis ===
- Şair Cezaevi Kapısında (1992)
- Galata Köprüsü (1995)
- İlhami Bekir'den Mektup Var (1997)
- Anılarımın Kardeşi İzmir (2001)

=== Essays ===
- Yazılmaz Bir İstanbul (1988)
- İki Sevda Arasında Karasevda (1994)
- Yasemin ve Martı (1997)

=== Anthologies ===
- Türk Yazınında Cezaevi Şiirleri (1993)
- Öykülerle İstanbul (1995)

=== Modernizations ===
- Yedi İklim Dört Bucak (1977, for kids from Evliya Çelebi)
- Şakaname (1983, for kids from Evliya Çelebi)
- Mavi Alacalı Baston (1983, for kids from Muallim Naci)

== Awards ==
- 1979 Yeditepe Şiir Armağanı, with Çırak Aranıyor
- 1983 Necatigil Şiir Ödülü, with Nereye Uçar Gökyüzü
- 1993 Halil Kocagöz Şiir Ödülü with Menzil
- 2014 PEN Türkiye Şiir Ödülü
- 2018 Behçet Aysan Şiir Ödülü
