= Yücel Gündoğdu =

Turkish karateka (born 1985)

- Born: August 10, 1985 (age 41); Istanbul, Turkey
- Nationality: Turkish
- Weight: 65 kg (143 lb)
- Division: −65 kg
- Style: Karate Kumite
- Team: Istanbul BB SK

Yücel Gündoğdu (born 10 August 1985) is a Turkish karateka competing in the kumite −65 kg division. He is a European champion and represents Istanbul BB SK.

== Career ==
Gündoğdu achieved his first major success in 2005 by winning gold medals in both the −60 kg and team kumite events at the European Cadet, Junior and U21 Karate Championships held in Thessaloniki, Greece. Later that year, he won the team kumite gold and an individual bronze in the −60 kg category at the World Junior & Cadet Karate Championships in Limassol, Cyprus.

In 2006, he became European champion in team kumite at the 2006 European Karate Championships in Stavanger, Norway. A year later, he won the European title in the −65 kg category at the 2007 European Karate Championships in Bratislava, Slovakia, and took bronze at the Italian Open.

Gündoğdu won the team kumite gold medal at the 2008 World Karate Championships in Tokyo, Japan. In 2010, he claimed multiple silver and bronze medals at the European Karate Regions Championships and the Balkan Championships.

In 2012, he took silver in team kumite at both the 2012 World Karate Championships in Paris, France, and the 2012 European Karate Championships in Tenerife, Spain. That same year, he won the −67 kg gold medal at the Balkan Championships in Herceg Novi, Montenegro.
