= Ali F. Bilir =

Turkish writer

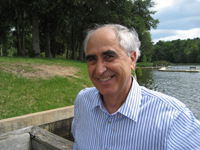
Ali F. Bilir

Ali F. Bilir (born in 1945 in Gülnar, Mersin, Turkey) is a poet, author and critic, and an active member of Turkish Authors Association. He attended the School of Medicine for a year, but graduated from the Faculty of Pharmacy, University of Istanbul, in 1969.

During his university years, he worked part-time at a tourist youth hostel in Istanbul as a reception clerk and later as a manager. In 1967, as an adventure, he toured Europe and North Africa, mainly on foot. For a while, he lived in Essex and London to improve his English language skills, doing various jobs. He participated in the student and youth movements of 1968.

In 1970, he published the literary magazine called “North.” Between 1995 and 2005, he was the arts and culture reporter for the local newspapers, “Katılım” and “Yeni Gazete.”

His poems, short stories and articles on various subjects have been published in local, regional, national, and international periodicals, magazines, and journals. His work has won many awards. Ali F. Bilir's last poetry book Migration Ballads is being granted by the Turkish government as one of the significant examples of Turkish written heritage. Migration Ballads is published by Plain View Press, U.S.A., in 2008, within the scope of TEDA project.

Ali F. Bilir is also a member of Turkish Authors Association (Edebiyatçılar Derneği), Türkiye Yazarlar Sendikası, The European Writers’ Council (EWC), Language Association of Turkey (Dil Derneği), National Federation of State Poetry Societies, and Big Bend Poets chapter of the Florida State Poets Association.

== Bibliography ==
Short Stories

- Üşüyen Sıcak Düşlerim (My Shivering Warm Dreams) 1994, E Yayınları

Poems

- Göç Türküsü (Migration Ballads) 1995, E Yayınları - Poems
- Güz Anımsamaları (Autumn Reminiscences) 2003, E Yayınları - Poems
- Migration Ballads, 2008, Plain View Press - Poems

Critique

- Eleştiriden Günceye (From Critique to Diary) 1996, E Yayınları

Compilations

- Mersin'de Aydın Olmak (Being an Intellectual in Mersin) 2005, Etik yayınları - (co-compiler:Orhan Ozdemir)

Research

- Orta Asya'dan Toroslar'a Gülnar (Gülnar – From Central Asia to Taurus Mountains) 2007, Etik Yayınları - (co-author: F. Saadet Bilir)

Monographies

- Abdülkadir Bulut, “Kasabalı Lorca” - Yaşamöyküsü, Şiir, Yazı, Söyleşi ve Mektupları… (Abdulkadir Bulut, “Lorca the Townsman” - His Life, Poems, Articles, Interviews, and Letters) 2010, E Yayınları - (co-author: F. Saadet Bilir)
- Abdülkadir Bulut'a Sevgi Sözleri (Love Words to Abdulkadir Bulut) 2010, E Yayınları - (co-author: F. Saadet Bilir)

== Awards ==
Ali F.Bilir's poems, short stories and articles on various subjects have been published in local, regional, national, and international periodicals, magazines, and journals. He has received many awards:

- 1990, Günes Magazine (Sweden), fiction story award, 3rd place
- 1993, Orhan Kemal fiction story award, 3rd place
- 1996, Ibrahim Yildiz poetry award, Honorable Mention for the book of Göç Türküsü (Migration Ballads)
- 1998, Samim Kocagöz fiction story award, 2nd place
- 2004, S. Avni Olez poetry award, Jury Special Prize, for the poetry book of Güz Animsamalari (Autumn Reminiscences)
- 2008, The people who make impressions on Mersin, awarded by the Mersin Governor's Office and the University of Mersin
