= Tahsin Yücel =

Turkish writer (1933–2016)

Tahsin Yücel (17 August 1933 – 22 January 2016) was a Turkish translator, novelist, essayist, literary critic, and Semiotics professor.

Born in Elbistan, Yücel studied at the Istanbul University, graduating in French philology. After completing his postgraduate studies, in 1978 he became professor in the same university. Tahsin Yücel made significant contributions to the establishment of linguistics and semiotics as scientific disciplines in Turkey.<ref>Ece, Ayse. "Tahsın Ahsın Çevırı". Istanbul University Press (in English and Turkish). Dilbilim Dergisi. p. 1./ref>

In addition to being author of essays, novels and short stories, Yücel was translator of about 70 novels from French into Turkish.
