= Birhan Keskin =

Turkish poet (born 1963)

- Born: 1963 (age 62–63); Kırklareli, Turkey
- Education: Istanbul University
- Occupations: Poet, editor
- Writing career
- Language: Turkish
- Period: 20th century, 21st century
- Genre: Poems
- Notable awards: Golden Orange Award (2005) Metin Altıok Poetry Award (2011)

Birhan Keskin (born 1963) is a Turkish poet.

Keskin was born and raised in Kırklareli, Turkey. She graduated in 1986 from Istanbul University with a degree in sociology and wrote her first poems in 1984. Between 1995 and 1998, she worked as an editor for the magazine Göçebe (Nomad) as well as for other publishing houses in Istanbul.

== Poetry ==
=== Poetry books in Turkish ===
- Delilirikler / Crazy Lyrics (İskenderiye Kütüphanesi Yayınları, 1991)
- Bakarsın Üzgün Dönerim / I May Return Unhappily (Era Yayıncılık, 1994)
- Cinayet Kışı + İki Mektup / Winter of Murder + Two Letters (Göçebe Şiir Kitapları, 1996)
- Yirmi Lak Tablet + Yolcunun Siyah Bavulu / 20 Polished Tablets + The Traveler’s Black Suitcase (YKY, 1999)
- Yeryüzü Halleri / States of the Earth (YKY, 2002)
- Y'ol / Road (2006)
- Soğuk Kazı (2010)
- Furkanın gülüşüne yazılan şiirler (2021)

=== Poems available in English ===
- The Winter of Murder / Cinayet Kışı (http://www.turkishpoetry.net/, 1996, translation by Nebile Direkcigil)
- & Silk & Love & Flame (Arc Publications, 2013, translation by George Messo) including the 3 poems "& Silk & Love & Flame", "Fig" and "Water"

== Awards ==
Birhan Keskin was the winner of the following awards:

- Golden Orange Award (2005)
- Metin Altıok Poetry Award (2011)
