= Cahit Zarifoğlu =

Turkish poet and writer (1940–1987)

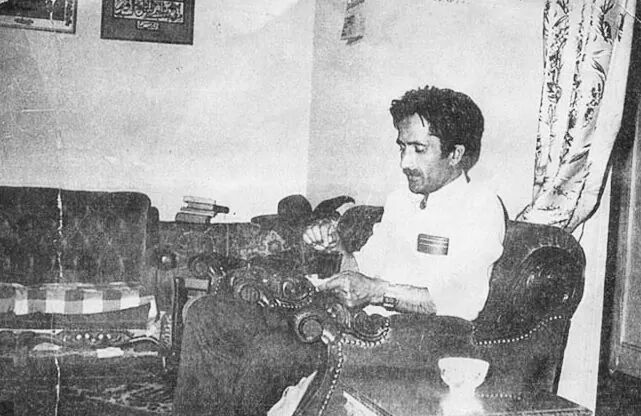
- Born: Abdurrahman Cahit Zarifoğlu; 1 July 1940; Ankara, Turkey
- Died: 7 June 1987 (aged 46); Istanbul, Turkey
- Writing career
- Genres: Poem, novel
- Notable works: Poems, Yaşamak
- Website: www.zarifce.com

Signature
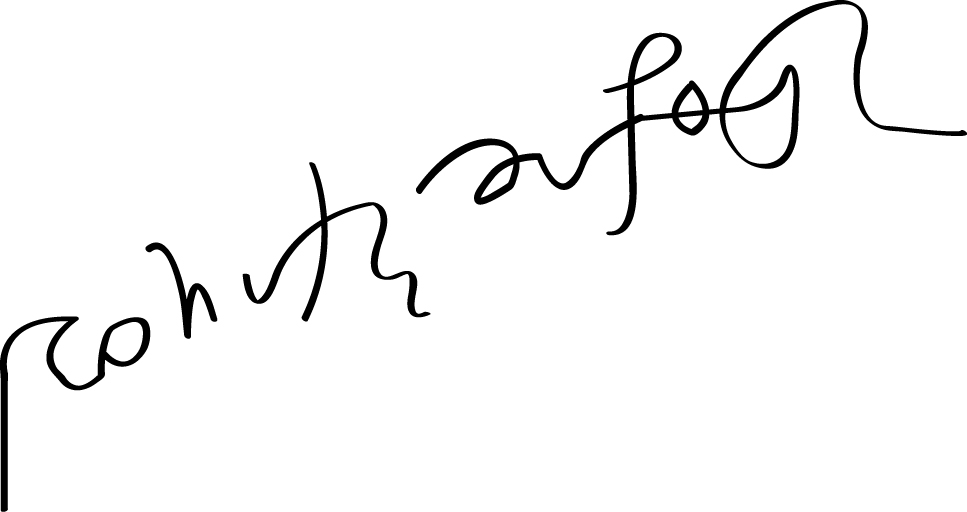

Abdurrahman Cahit Zarifoğlu (1 July 1940 – 7 June 1987) was a Turkish poet and writer.

== Life ==
Zarifoğlu was born in Ankara in 1940 and he grew up in Kahramanmaraş. He started writing poetry during his high school years at Kahramanmaraş High School. After high school, he went to Istanbul and studied German language and literature at Istanbul University. He published his poems in Diriliş magazine. He was a contributor to the magazines Yeni Dergi, Soyut, and Papirüs between 1961 and 1971. In 1976, he published some of his poems, stories, diaries and conversations in Mavera. He was also one of the founders of this magazine.

He worked as a teacher several times. When he was publishing the Mavera magazine, he was also working in TRT as a translator. He died in 1987. His grave is in Küplüce Cemetery in Beylerbeyi.

== Bibliography ==
=== Poetry ===
- İşaret Çocukları (1967)
- Yedi Güzel Adam (1973)
- Menziller (1977)
- Korku ve Yakarış (1986)
- Gülücük (1989)
- Ağaç Okul (1990)

=== Diaries ===
- Yaşamak (1980)

=== Stories and Novels ===
- İns (1974)
- Serçekuş (1983)
- Ağaçkakanlar (1983)
- Katıraslan (1983)
- Yürek Dede ile Padişah (1984)
- Savaş Ritmleri (1985)
- Motorlu Kuş (1987)

=== Theatre ===
- Sütçü İmam (1987)

=== Essays ===
- Bir Değirmendir Bu Dünya (1987)
- Zengin Hayaller Peşinde (2006)

=== Other ===
- Okuyucularla (2009)
- Mektuplar (2010)
