= Kenan Yücel =

Turkish writer (born 1974)

Kenan Yücel (born 1974) is a Turkish poet and writer.

== Biography ==
Yücel was born in 1974 in Bursa, Turkey. He spent his childhood and early youth in Bursa, and graduated from Marmara University, Faculty of Law (2001). He lives in Istanbul.

His poetry first met with its readers at "Başka" poetry review (1997). In various poetry magazines, his poems, critiques and writings on poetry are published. Critics expressed him as one of the poets of 2000s whose poetry has its problematic, and from his own individual life he works out social issues.

He is editor-inchief of "Ve" publishing house.

== Bibliography ==
=== Poetry ===
- Uzaklara Atılmış Bir Kedi Hüznü, Yitik Ülke Press, 2007, ISBN 978-9944-493-18-5
- Örselenmiş Ruhlar Bandosu, Şiirden Press, 2009, ISBN 978-975-9056-56-8
- Sabahsız Bir Gecenin Uykusuzu, Şiirden Press, 2011, ISBN 978-975-9056-96-4
