= İsmet Özel =

Turkish poet and writer (born 1944)

- Born: 19 September 1944 (age 81); Kayseri, Turkey
- Citizenship: Turkish
- Education: Hacettepe University
- Notable work: Evet, İsyan; Erbain; Üç Zor Mesele

İsmet Özel (born 19 September 1944, in Kayseri, Turkey) is a Turkish poet and writer.

== Biography ==
Özel was born in Kayseri in September 1944. His parents were Ahmet and Sıdıka Özel, and his father was a police officer from Söke. He attended primary and secondary school in Kastamonu, Çankırı and Ankara. In 1963, he attended classes at Faculty of Political Science, Ankara University, and graduated from the French language department of Hacettepe University in 1976.

Özel was among the contributors of the literary magazine Papirüs which was edited by Cemal Süreya.

== Bibliography ==
=== Poetry ===
1. Geceleyin Bir Koşu (A Run in the Night)
2. Evet, İsyan (Yes, Rebellion)
3. Cinayetler Kitabı (The Book of Murders)
4. Celladıma Gülümserken (Whilst I Smile at My Executioner)
5. Erbain (The Poems of 40 Years)
6. Bir Yusuf Masalı (A Yusef Fairytale)
7. Çatlıycak Kadar Aşkî (Enough Love to Crack)
8. Of Not Being A Jew

=== Books ===
1. Üç Mesele (Three Problems)
2. Zor Zamanda Konuşmak (Speaking in Hard Times)
3. Taşları Yemek Yasak (It is Prohibited to Eat the Stones)
4. Bakanlar ve Görenler (Lookers and Seers)
5. Faydasız Yazılar (Useless Writings)
6. İrtica Elden Gidiyor (Reaction is Getting Out of Hand)
7. Surat Asmak Hakkımız (Our Right to Frown)
8. Tehdit Değil Teklif (An Offer Not a Threat)
9. Waldo Sen Neden Burada Değilsin? (Waldo, Why Aren't You Here?)
10. Sorulunca Söylenen (Things That are Said When Asked)
11. Cuma Mektupları - 1 (Juma Letters -1)
12. Cuma Mektupları - 2
13. Cuma Mektupları - 3
14. Cuma Mektupları - 4
15. Cuma Mektupları - 5
16. Cuma Mektupları - 6
17. Cuma Mektupları - 7
18. Cuma Mektupları - 8
19. Cuma Mektupları - 9
20. Cuma Mektupları - 10
21. Tahrir Vazifeleri (Tahrir Missions)
22. Neyi Kaybettiğini Hatırla (Remember What You've Lost)
23. Ve'l-Asr
24. Tavşanın Randevusu (The Date of the Rabbit)
25. Bilinç Bile İlginç (Even the Conscious is Interesting)
26. Şiir Okuma Kılavuzu (Guide to Reading Poetry)
27. 40 Hadis (40 Hadith)
28. Henry Sen Neden Buradasın-1 (Henry, Why Are You Here?-1)
29. Henry Sen Neden Buradasın-2 (Henry, Why Are You Here?-2)
30. Kalıntürk (Thickturk)
31. Çenebazlık (Roistering)
32. Şairin Devriye Nöbeti 1 - Tok Kurda Puslu Hava (Poet's Patrol Duty 1 - A Smoky Day for a Satiated Wolf)
33. Şairin Devriye Nöbeti 2 - Bileşenleriyle Basit (Poet's Patrol Duty 2 - Simple with Its Components)
34. Şairin Devriye Nöbeti 3 - Neredeyizim (Poet's Patrol Duty 3 - Whereareweism)
35. Şairin Devriye Nöbeti 4 - Ebruli Külah (Poet's Patrol Duty 4 - Mottled Cap)
36. Şairin Devriye Nöbeti 5 - Evet mi Hayır mı? Sınıf Savaşı Evet Milli Mücadele Hayır (Poet's Patrol Duty 5 - Yes or No? Yes to Class Battles No to National Struggle)

=== Interview and Letters ===
1. Sorulunca Söylenen
2. Genç Bir Şairden Genç Bir Şaire Mektuplar (Letters from a Young Poet to a Young Poet, correspondence with Ataol Behramoğlu, 1995)

=== Translations ===
1. Siyasi Felsefenin Büyük Düşünürleri (Great Political Thinkers by William Ebenstein)
2. Gariplerin Kitabı (The Book of Strangers by Ian Dallas)
3. Osmanli İmparatorluğu ve İslami Gelenek (Ottoman Empire and Islamic Tradition by Norman Itzkowitz)
4. Bilim Kutsal Bir İnektir (Science is a sacred cow by Anthony Standen)
