= Asaf Halet Çelebi =

Turkish poet

Asaf Halet Çelebi (27 December 1907 – 15 October 1958) was a Turkish mystical poet. Although not very widely known, due to his erudite and often foreign-influenced style, he is considered to be Turkey's first surrealist poet.

== Biography ==
Çelebi was born in Istanbul, Ottoman Empire in 1907, as the son of Mehmet Sait Halet Bey, an official of the Ottoman Ministry of Internal Affairs. Asaf Halet's surname at birth was not Çelebi, but he adopted it due to his reverence to the 13th-century Persian poet and Sufi mystic, Rumi. Descendants of Rumi established the Sufi Mevlevi Order, which they led for over 700 years under the name or title Çelebi, translating to 'gentleman', 'well-mannered' or 'courteous'. Asaf Halet Çelebi, however, was not a descendant of Rumi.

Çelebi studied at Galatasaray High School in Istanbul. He started his higher education at the School of Fine Arts, which he left shortly after, and continued them at the Vocational School of Law.

After graduating, he worked at the Ottoman Bank and the State Maritime Administration. However, he has worked through most of his life as a librarian, and at the time of his death in 1958, he was employed as such at the Philosophy Department of the Faculty of Letters in Istanbul.

Asaf Halet Çelebi died on 15 October 1958, age 51, and is buried at the Beylerbeyi Küplüce Cemetery in Üsküdar, Istanbul.

== Literary work ==
In his youth Çelebi was still influenced by Ottoman court literature, but starting from 1937 he adopted Western poetic styles and techniques, such as free-form verse. In his poems one finds themes originating in the cultures of Persia and India.

As a librarian, Çelebi had a lot of time and opportunity to read, and his readings stood at the base of his poetic work. An often recurring theme of his poems are philosophical ideas which he found, for instance, in Buddhism. From there he took names and terms with vast philosophical connotations, such as Siddhartha and Mara, which, for the non-initiated, created an obstacle in understanding his work, although he did provide explanations in his prose.

During his youth, Çelebi wrote, without publishing them, poems in the classical Eastern formats of the ghazal and Rubaʿi quatrain. He only started publishing in magazines and newspapers in 1938, becoming known for his mix of Eastern "exotic, mystical and warm" qualities with an understanding of Western culture. He became the only Turkish abstract poet of his time, basing most of his poems on fairy tales, religions or oneiric symbols. Although a fellow supporter of 'pure poetry', Çelebi's work differs from that of Yahya Kemal Beyatlı in that he regards poems in a more holistic manner, and his disregard for storytelling sets him apart from the Garip movement. He even considers metre and rhyme unnecessary, but without renouncing form; instead, he searches for a new form, a position that puts him ahead of his time and makes him fit into the latest currents of today.

Çelebi had a deep understanding of Eastern and Western cultures. He wrote articles about Eastern civilisations and Persian literature, and researched Divan literature. His poetry was the result of his combined knowledge of philosophy, music, Ottoman culture, Persian culture and French poetry. This makes it a prerequisite for his readers to acquire a certain level of knowledge, too, before they can fully understand the quality of Çelebi's work.

Çelebi has translated Rumi's quatrains into Turkish and French, in 1939 and 1950, respectively.

== Bibliography ==
=== Poetry ===
- "He" (1942)
- "Lâmelif" (1945)
- "Om Mani Padme Hum" (1953)

=== Prose ===
- "Mevlâna" (1940)
- "Molla Câmi" (1940)
- "Eşrefoğlu Divanı" (1944)
- "Naima" (monography, 1953)
- "Ömer Hayyam" (1954)
- "Divan Şiirinde İstanbul" (anthology, 1953)

== See also ==
- List of contemporary Turkish poets
