= Talât Sait Halman =

Turkish writer and historian (1931–2014)

Minister of Culture of Turkey
- In office 13 July 1971 – 13 December 1971
- Succeeded by: Nermin Çiftçi

Personal details
- Born: 7 July 1931 Istanbul, Turkey
- Died: 5 December 2014 (aged 83) Ankara, Turkey
- Education: Robert College (BA); Columbia University (MA)
- Institutions: Columbia University; Princeton University; University of Pennsylvania; Bilkent University

Talât Sait Halman, GBE (7 July 1931 – 5 December 2014) was a Turkish poet, translator and cultural historian. He was the first Minister of Culture of Turkey. From 1998 onward, he taught at Bilkent University as the dean of the Faculty of Humanities and Letters.

== Biography ==
Halman received his B.A. from Robert College in Istanbul. In the mid-1950s he received his master's degree from Columbia University in political science, international relations and international law.

During his long academic career, Halman taught at Columbia University, Princeton University (1965–1971) and (1972–1980), the University of Pennsylvania and New York University, where he also served as Chairman of the Department of Near Eastern Languages and Literatures. He taught at Bilkent University in Ankara from 1998, rising to become the Dean of the Faculty of Humanities and Letters. While there, he helped to found a program in Turkish languages and literature with a goal of introducing new critical approaches.

His honors include Columbia University's Thornton Wilder Prize for lifetime achievement as translator, an honorary doctorate from the Boğaziçi University, a Rockefeller Fellowship in the Humanities, the UNESCO Medal, and "Knight Grand Cross, the Most Excellent Order of the British Empire").

In 1971, he served as Turkey's first minister of culture. During his tenure, he coordinated the whirling dervishes' landmark first tour of the US in 1971. In 1976 he oversaw the first American museum tour of historical and cultural artifacts from the Ottoman Sultans' palace. From 1980 to 1982, he served as the Turkey's first ambassador for cultural affairs. Based in New York, he inaugurated a comprehensive program of Turkish cultural activities. From 1991 to 1995 he was a member of UNESCO's Executive Board.

He served as a member of the Executive Committee of the PEN American Center and worked at the Center's Translation Committee. He was a long-time member of the Poetry Society of America and a member of the Editorial Board of World Literature Today from 1967.

In 1971, during her visit to Turkey, Queen Elizabeth II conferred a Knight Grand Cross (GBE) on Halman.

Halman was also a well-known translator into English as well as Turkish. His books in English include two collections of his poems ("Shadows of Love", published in Canada, and "A Last Lullaby", published in the United States), Contemporary Turkish Literature, Modern Turkish Drama, Living Poets of Turkey, three books of the 13th century Anatolian mystic folk poet Yunus Emre, Rumi and the Whirling Dervishes (with Metin And), Suleiman the Magnificent - Poet, Turkish Legends and Folk poems, Tales of Nasreddin Hodja, and others. His 1984 book on Celalettin Rumi preceded and contributed to the wave of Rumi enthusiasm in the United States in the 1990s. His books on Rumi, Nasrettin Hoca, and Turkish Legends books are widely available throughout Turkey. He also published books featuring selections from the work of Fazıl Hüsnü Dağlarca, Orhan Veli Kanık, Sait Faik Abasıyanık, and Melih Cevdet Anday. His renditions of three Turkish plays (I, Anatolia by Güngör Dilmen, Old Photographs by Dinçer Sümer, and In Ambush by Cahit Atay) have also been published.

His books in Turkish include nine collections of his original poems, two massive anthologies of the poetry of ancient times, a book of Ancient Egyptian poems, the selected poems of Wallace Stevens and Langston Hughes, an anthology of living American poets, a book of American woman poets, his verse translations of Shakespeare's Complete Sonnets, a book of Eskimo poems, a one-actor play featuring Shakespeare, etc. He has translated Robinson Jeffers' version of "Medea"', Neal Simon's "Lost in Yonkers"', Dear Liar" (based on George Bernard Shaw-Mrs Patrick Campbell letters) and Eugene O'Neill's "The Iceman Cometh" (for the two latters plays he won Turkey's top play translation awards.) He was the first Turkish translator of William Faulkner.

In poetry Talat Sait Halman found, as he is quoted in a biographical essay listed below: "freedom of intellectual and emotional exploration; freedom in creative prospects..." (Festschrift, p. 5)

== Festschrift ==
In 2000, Talat Sait Halman was honored on his 70th birthday with a Festschrift (a volume of scholarly articles compiled by colleagues as a tribute to an eminent scholar). His Festschrift, published by Syracuse University Press and edited by Jayne Warner, is titled, Cultural Horizons: a Festschrift in honor of Talat S. Halman. Volume I runs 617 pages and includes contributions by 71 scholars. Volume II is a Curriculum Vitae, running 184 pages and accounting for all of Professor Halman's vocational, literary and artistic activities and contributions (up to 1999) under five rubrics: (1) Monographs, (2) Prose, (3) Poetry, (4) Lectures, Speeches, Poetry Readings, Conferences and Special Programs, and (5) Media Events and Productions. In 2005, Professor Halman edited and translated (with Associate Editor Jayne L. Warner) an anthology of Turkish love poems covering the entire span of Turkish poetry. Nightingales and Pleasure Gardens: Turkish Love Poems (Syracuse University Press, 2005). The first section of "Premodern poems," includes love poems, mystical love poems, classical lyrics, poems by the Ottoman Sultans and poems of wandering folk-poets. In the second part of the book, Professor Halman provides "Love Poems from the Turkish Republic." In 2006 Syracuse also published a retrospective anthology of his collected poems, fiction, drama, essays and other writings, edited by Jayne Warner: The Turkish Muse: Views and Reviews.

== There are a Thousand Paths for the Intellect ==
As a man of such diverse talents and accomplishments, he has made his own version of a Turkish proverb his guideline. Punning on the common Turkish proverb "There is but one path for the mind" (Aklin Yolu Birdir) Professor Halman, in the spirit of tolerance modeled by Jelaluddin Rumi, asserts instead: "There are a thousand paths for the intellect." (Aklin Yolu Bindir). This transformed version of the proverb is the title of the introductory biographical chapter in the Festschrift Vol. I, pp. 2–36 (English version, pp. 2–19.) Aklın Yolu Bindir (published by Turkiye Bankasi, no date, but this volume appeared near the turn of the millennium) is also the title of an interview-format autobiography edited by Cahide Birgul. This biographical interview runs to 519 pages and also features many photos of Professor Halman and his family, both predecessors and progeny. The book also features other illustrations, newspaper cartoons, newspaper mentions, etc. Over the course of the last decade Professor Halman, together with his daughter Defne Halman, an actor, has presented many readings of Poems by the 13th-century Turkish 'Ur-poet' Yunus Emre (born 1321). One couplet that he has especially emphasized in many of his talks is from the following poem by Yunus Emre:

We regard no one's religion as contrary to ours

True love is born when all faiths are united as a whole.

== Family ==
Halman's father, Admiral Sait Halman served in the Turkish War of Independence (for which service he was decorated) and in World War II. (Festschrift, p. 4) Professor Halman's father Sait also published many translations and wrote many books on naval and military history including a monograph on the Piri Reis map, the oldest extant map showing the New World. Professor Halman's mother Iclal (Ijlal) was a member of the prestigious Nemlizade family. Both lineages sprang from the Trabzon area in Northeast Anatolia near the Black Sea. In fact the last name "Halman" is derived from the Byzantine era Greek name of the village Derin Kuyu ("Deep Well"); in the Byzantine era, the village was known as "Holamana." Atatürk interpreted the name to be a combination of two words: word hal (new, contemporary, even in some contexts a spiritual state) and man. When during the institution of the Surname Law, Turks were transitioning from Islamic naming patterns, choosing European style names, and self-selecting surnames, Atatürk expressed appreciation for Admiral Sait Halman's choice of a name befitting the vision of the new Turkish Republic. (Festschrift, p. 4)

As indicated on page four of Jayne Warner's biographical introduction in Professor Halman's Festschrift, in 1960 Professor Halman married Seniha Taskiranel. Professor Halman's daughter, Defne Halman, born May 13, 1972, is a well known media personality, actress and artist currently living and working in Turkey. His son, Sait Salim Halman (1966–1983) was extremely proficient in math and science.

Henry Glasse, co-director of Indiana University's Turkish studies program has written of Professor Halman: "At a time of narrowing vision, of fragmentation and cowardice in the academy, Talat Sait Halman offers a heroic model of the intellectual. He has given the world works of an astonishing range of topics while unifying his creations with stylish grace and preserving a high sense of responsibility. Talat Halman has written clearly and publicly about subjects that matter to humanity, and through his perfect translations, through books at once scholarly and popular, he has worked valiantly and elegantly to close the gap of ignorance that divides the United States and Turkey." (Festschrift, p. 86)

== Bibliography ==
- Cahide Birgul, Aklin Yolu Bindir (Turkiye Bankasi, no date.) (This is an interview format autobiography including many photos of family, as described in the article above.)
- Halman, H. Talat. "Yunus Emre," in Phyllis Jestice, ed. in Holy People of the World: A Cross-Cultural Encyclopedia. ABC-CLIO, 2004 ISBN 1-57607-355-6
- Halman, Talat Sait. The Humanist Poetry of Yunus Emre. (R.C.D. Cultural Institute, nd. [approx., 1972])
- Halman, Talat Sait, and Metin And. Mevlana Celaleddin Rumi and the Whirling Dervishes (Istanbul: Dost Yayinlari, 1983, 1992, ) ISBN 975-7499-09-9 (The back cover of this book was printed as the front cover of one of the earliest books by Coleman Barks, the prodigious Rumi translator, popularizer and performer of Rumi's poems.)
- Halman, Talat Sait. Yunus Emre and his Mystical Poetry. (Indiana University Press), 3rd. ed. 1991.
- Jayne Warner, ed. Cultural Horizons: a Festschrift in Honor of Talat Sait Halman Volume I (617 pages) Volume II (184 pages) (Syracuse University Press, 2001, 617 pages) ISBN 0-8156-8132-1 Published in Turkey by: Yapi Kredi Yayinlari.
