= Turgut Uyar =

Turkish poet

- Born: August 4, 1927; Ankara, Turkey
- Died: August 22, 1985 (aged 58); Istanbul, Turkey
- Occupation: Poet
- Notable work: Dünyanın En Güzel Arabistanı
- Spouses: Yezdan Şener (m. 1947; div. 1966) Tomris Uyar (m. 1969–1985)
- Children: 4

Turgut Uyar (August 4, 1927 – August 22, 1985) was a Turkish poet.

== Life ==
Turgut Uyar was born in Ankara on 4 August 1927 as the fifth of the six children of Fatma Hanım and Hayri Bey. His father served as a squadron leader in the Ottoman Army and his mother was a housewife. He attended primary school in different cities in Turkey. Then he went to military high school in Bursa. He married Yezdan Şener when he was going to university and he had three children, Semiramis, Tunga and Şeyda, from this marriage. He served as a personnel officer in Posof, Terme and Ankara. He published articles in the Forum magazine in the 1950s. He resigned from office in 1958 and divorced his wife in 1966. After moving to Istanbul, he married Tomris Uyar in 1969. He died on 22 August 1985 from cirrhosis.
