= Edip Cansever =

Turkish poet

Edip Cansever (pronounced [eˈdip ˈdʒanseveɾ]; 8 August 1928 – 28 May 1986) was a Second New Movement Turkish poet. Talât Sait Halman referred to Cansever as in the light of surrealist Asaf Halet Celebi and Orhan Sarıkaya characterized him as a nonconformist.

== Biography ==
Born in Istanbul, Turkey, Cansever attended Trade Academy for some time, and worked as an antiquity salesman in Grand Bazaar, Istanbul. Despite his denial, he is considered to be a member of second new generation:

The poetry of Edip Cansever has two main characteristics: Being the proof of his life and the result of his poetry craftsmanship. A new essence, a new verse form reaches the niveau of simpleness only after undergoing a layered process of craftmanship. Being an opposer of rigid forms makes him an artist of the Ikinci Yeni movement. His accomplished revolutionizing of rigid forms comes from the urge of the essence (Doğan Hızlan, 1983).

He developed objective correlative before T. S. Eliot's work was translated into Turkish, afterward being inspired by Eliot's development and stating he saw the concept as essential to his own poetry's "decoration".

== Works ==
- İkindi Üstü (1947)
- Dirlik Düzenlik (1954)
- Yerçekimli Karanfil (1957)
- Umutsuzlar Parkı (1958)
- Petrol (1959)
- Nerde Antigone (1961)
- Sonrası Kalır (1964)
- Çağrılmayan Yakup (1966)
- Kirli Ağustos (1970)
- Tragedyalar (1974)
- Ben Ruhi Bey Nasılım (1976)
- Sevda ile Sezgi (1977)
- Şairin Seyir Defteri (1980)
- Yeniden (Collected Poems, 1981)
- Bezik Oynayan Kadınlar (1982)
- İlkyaz Şikayetçileri (1984)
- Oteller (1985)

== Sources ==
Bibliography

- Ahmet Necdet, Modern Turk Siiri Yonelimler, Tanikliklar, Ornekler, Broy Publishing, October 1993.
