= Fazıl Hüsnü Dağlarca =

Turkish poet (1914-2008)

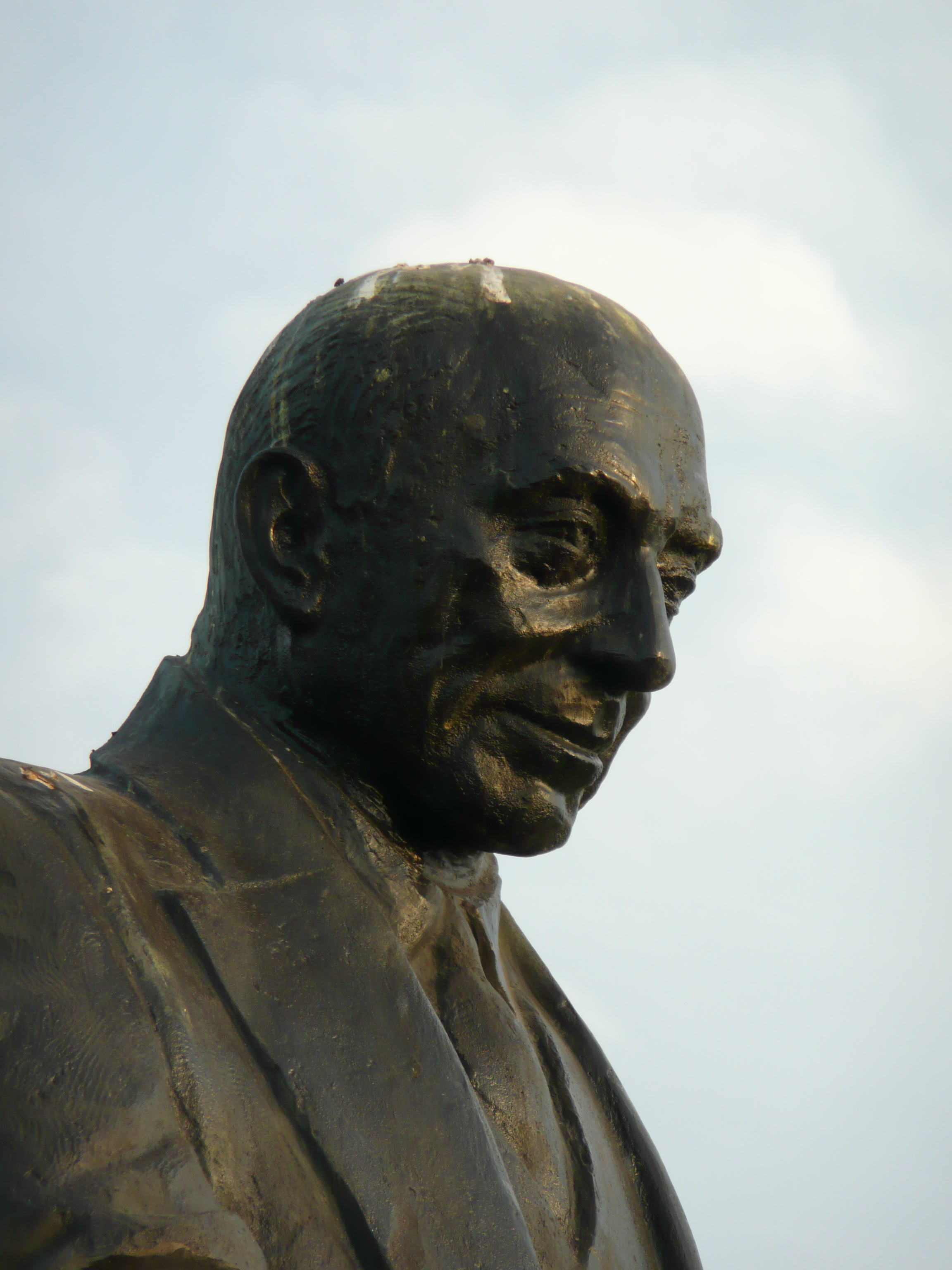
- Born: 26 August 1914; Istanbul, Ottoman Empire
- Died: 15 October 2008 (aged 94); Istanbul, Turkey
- Occupation: Poet

Signature
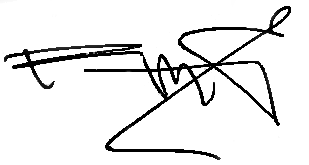

Fazıl Hüsnü Dağlarca (26 August 1914, Istanbul – 15 October 2008, Istanbul) was one of the most prolific Turkish poets of the Turkish Republic with more than 60 collections of his poems published as of 2007. He was a laureate of the Struga Poetry Evenings Golden Wreath Award.

== Biography ==
Dağlarca's purist use of the Turkish language brought a new dimension to contemporary Turkish literature. His poems treat themes such as the prehistory of mankind and the cosmos, but also antimilitarist themes and the Turkish War of Independence.

A selection of his poems have been translated into English by Talat Sait Halman (Selected Poems, Pittsburgh, PA: University of Pittsburgh Press, 1969).

Fazıl Hüsnü Dağlarca died on 16 October 2008 in İstanbul at the age of 94. He was laid to rest at the Karacaahmet Cemetery on 20 October 2008 following a funeral ceremony held in the Süreyya Opera House that was attended by politicians and high-ranking officials.

Dağlarca was among the contributors of the literary magazine Papirüs which was edited by Cemal Süreya.

== Bibliography ==
- Havaya Çizilen Dünya (1935)
- Çocuk ve Allah (1940)
- Daha (1943)
- Çakırın Destanı (1945)
- Taşdevri (1945)
- Üç Şehitler Destanı (1949)
- Toprak Ana (1950)
- Aç Yazı (1951)
- İstiklâl Savaşı – Samsun'dan Ankara'ya (1951)
- İstiklâl Savaşı – İnönüler (1951)
- Sivaslı Karınca (1951)
- İstanbul – Fetih Destanı (1953)
- Anıtkabir (1953)
- Asû (1955)
- Delice Böcek (1957)
- Batı Acısı (1958)
- Hoolar (1960)
- Özgürlük Alanı (1960)
- Cezayir Türküsü (1961)
- Aylam (1962)
- Türk Olmak (1963)
- Yedi Memetler (1964)
- Çanakkale Destanı (1965)
- Dışardan Gazel (1965)
- Kazmalama (1965)
- Yeryağ (1965)
- Viyetnam Savaşımız (1966)
- Açıl Susam Açıl (1967)
- Kubilay Destanı (1968)
- Haydi (1968)
- 19 Mayıs Destanı (1969)
- Hiroşima (1970)
- Malazgirt Ululaması (1971)
- Kuş Ayak (1971)
- Haliç (1972)
- Kınalı Kuzu Ağıdı (1972)
- Bağımsızlık Savaşı – Sakarya Kıyıları (1973)
- Bağımsızlık Savaşı – 30 Ağustos (1973)
- Bağımsızlık Savaşı – İzmir Yollarında (1973)
- Gazi Mustafa Kemal Atatürk (1973)
- Arka Üstü (1974)
- Yeryüzü Çocukları (1974)
- Yanık Çocuklar Koçaklaması (1976)
- Horoz (1977)
- Hollandalı Dörtlükler (1977)
- Balinayla Mandalina (1977)
- Yazıları Seven ayı (1978)
- Göz Masalı (1979)
- Yaramaz Sözcükler (1979)
- Çukurova Koçaklaması (1979)
- Şeker Yiyen Resimler (1980)
- Cinoğlan (19819
- Hin ile Hincik (1981)
- Güneş Doğduran (1981)
- Çıplak (1981)
- Yunus Emre'de Olmak (1981)
- Nötron Bombası (1981)
- Koşan Ayılar Ülkesi (1982)
- Dişiboy (1985)
- İlk Yapıtla 50 Yıl Sonrakiler (1985)
- Takma Yaşamalar Çağı (1986)
- Uzaklarla Giyinmek (1990)
- Dildeki Bilgisayar (1992)

== Sources ==
- Ahmet Necdet, Modern Türk Şiiri Yönelimler, Tanıklıklar, Örnekler, Broy Yayınevi, October 1993.
- Biyografi.net – Biography of Fazıl Hüsnü Dağlarca
- Siirdostu.com – Biography and Poetry of Fazıl Hüsnü Dağlarca
- Ahmet Soysal, "Arzu ve Varlık, Dağlarca'ya Bakışlar", Yapı Kredi Yayınları, 1999 (2nd edition: 2007)
- Ahmet Soysal, "Eşsiz Olana Yakınlık", Kanat Yayınları (2006)
- Yasemin Arpa, Dağlarca ile Söz Kuşlarından Kalan Parıltı, Yazı Kitap (2010)
