= Cemal Süreya =

Kurdish poet, writer, and translator

Cemâl Süreya
- Born: Cemalettin Seber; 1931; Erzincan, Turkey
- Died: 9 January 1990 (aged 58–59); Istanbul, Turkey
- Education: Faculty of Political Science, Ankara University
- Occupations: Poet, writer
- Spouses: Seniha Seber (m. 1954–1962) Zühal Tekkanat (m. 1967–1975) Güngör Demiray (m. 1975–1975) Birsen Sağnak (m. 1980–1990)
- Partner: Tomris Uyar (1964–1967)
- Children: 2
- Writing career
- Years active: 1953–1990

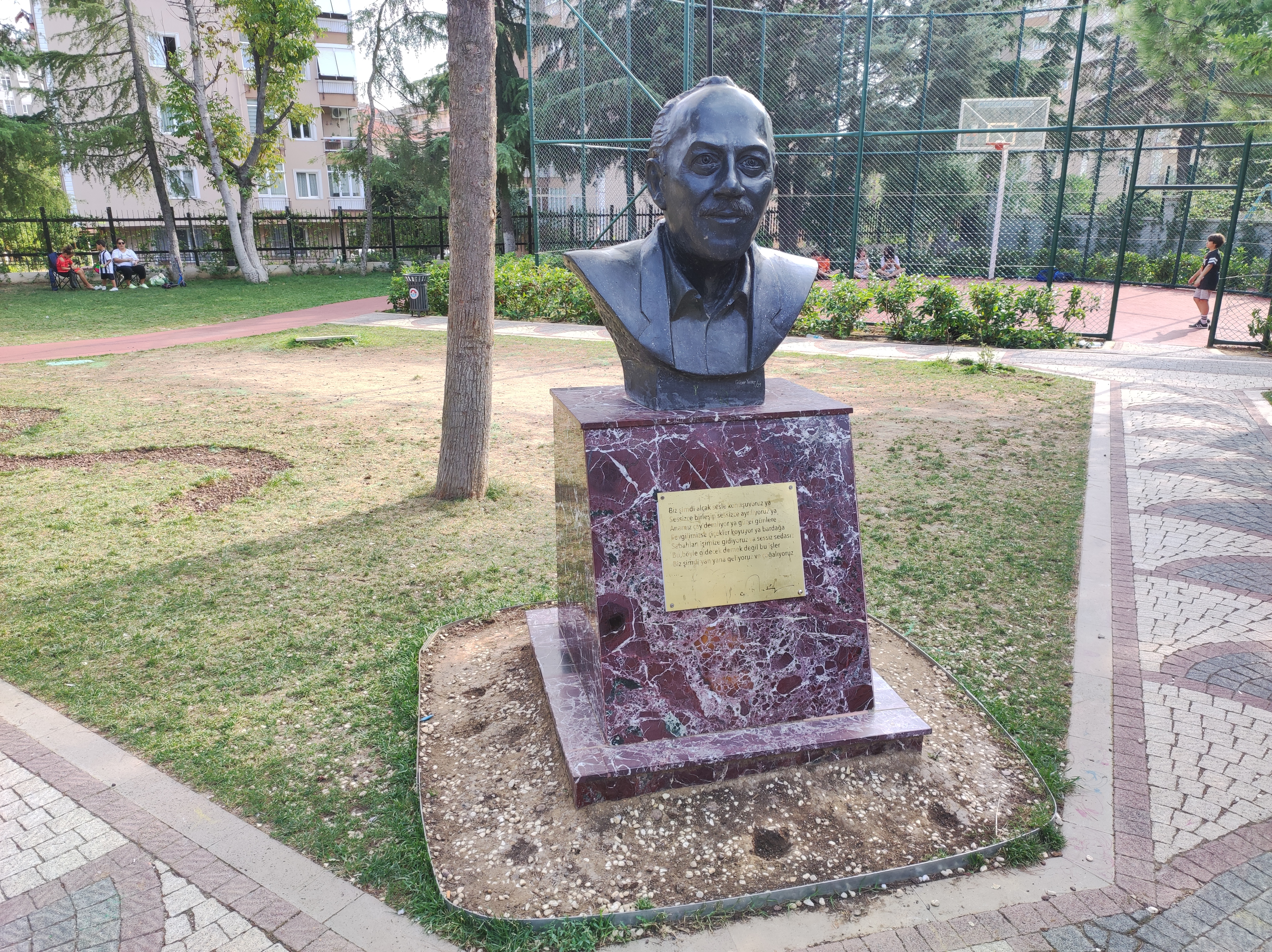
Bust of Cemal Süreya at a park named after him in Maltepe, Istanbul.

Cemal Süreya, known by his given name as Cemalettin Seber (1931, Erzincan – 9 January 1990, Istanbul), was a Zaza Kurd Alevi poet, writer, and translator. He was one of the pioneering poets of the İkinci Yeni (Second New Poetry) movement, a modernist movement in Turkish poetry. Although he made his first attempts at poetry with sketches in middle school and aruz in high school, his true poetic work began during his university years. In addition to his poetry collections; Üvercinka (1958), Göçebe (1965), Beni Öp Sonra Doğur Beni (1973), Uçurumda Açan (1984), Sıcak Nal (1988), Güz Bitigi (1988), and Sevda Sözleri (1990); he also wrote essays, critiques, diaries, and anthologies.

The most frequent themes in his works are love, women, loneliness, social and political criticism, death, the idea of God, portraits, and poetics in verse. He also translated nearly forty books from French into Turkish. With the exception of Onüç Günün Mektupları (1990), all of his articles and poems were first published in magazines and newspapers and then turned into books. Süreya, who held a socialist worldview, published the magazine Papirüs, in which he expressed his literary views and used it as a tool to express his ideas as an intellectual.

== Biography ==
Cemal Süreya, whose real name was Cemalettin Seber, was born in Pülümür, Erzincan (now in Tunceli Province) in 1931. His exact birthday is unknown. He was born into a Zaza Kurd Alevi-faith family that migrated from Pülümür to Erzincan. His Kurdish father, Hüseyin Seber, was born in Erzincan in 1905 and worked in the transportation business. His mother, Güllü Hanım, known as "Gülbeyaz", was born in Karatuş in 1915 into a Zaza family. His father died in a traffic accident in 1957 and his mother died at the age of twenty-three due to bleeding following a miscarriage.

In 1938, at age seven, Cemal Süreya and his family were among 181 families forcibly deported from Dersim (Tunceli) to Bilecik. He later described the experience in his poem '1938 Sürgün Şiiri'.

He graduated from the Political Sciences Faculty of Ankara University. He was the founder and editor-in-chief of the Papirüs literary magazine. Cemal Süreya is a notable member of the Second New Generation of Turkish poetry, an abstract and postmodern movement created as a backlash against the popular and colloquial Garip movement. Love, mainly through its erotic character, is a recurrent theme of Süreya's works. Süreya's poems and articles were published in magazines such as Yeditepe, Yazko, Pazar Postası, Yeni Ulus, Oluşum, Türkiye Yazıları, Politika, Aydınlık, and Somut. He is known to have been a primary influence on the poetry of Sunay Akın. He lost a letter "y" from his pen name – originally Süreyya – due to losing a bet with Turkish poet Sezai Karakoç.

== Bibliography ==
=== Poetry ===
- Üvercinka (1958)
- Göçebe (1965)
- Beni Öp Sonra Doğur Beni (1973)
- Sevda Sözleri (Terms of Endearment, 1984)
- Güz Bitiği (1988)
- Sıcak Nal (1988)
- Sevda Sözleri (1990)

=== Articles ===
- Şapkam Dolu Çiçekle (1976)
- Günübirlik (1982)
- Onüç Günün Mektupları (1990)
- 99 Yüz (1990)
- Günler (1991)
- Aydınlık Yazıları/Paçal (1992)
- Oluşum'da Cemal Süreya (1992)
- Folklor Şiire Düşman (1992)
- Papirüs'ten Başyazılar (1992)
- Uzat Saçlarını Frigya (1992)
- Aritmetik iyi Kuşlar Pekiyi (1993) – for children

=== Translations ===
- Kürtler: Sosyolojik ve Tarihi İnceleme by Basil Nikitin, translated into Turkish under the pseudonym C.S.

== See also ==
- List of contemporary Turkish poets
