= Şairler Sofası =

Sculpture by Gürdal Duyar and Park in Istanbul

Hallway of Poets
- Sofa Poets Park
- Şairler Sofası Şairler Parkı Şairler Sofası Parkı
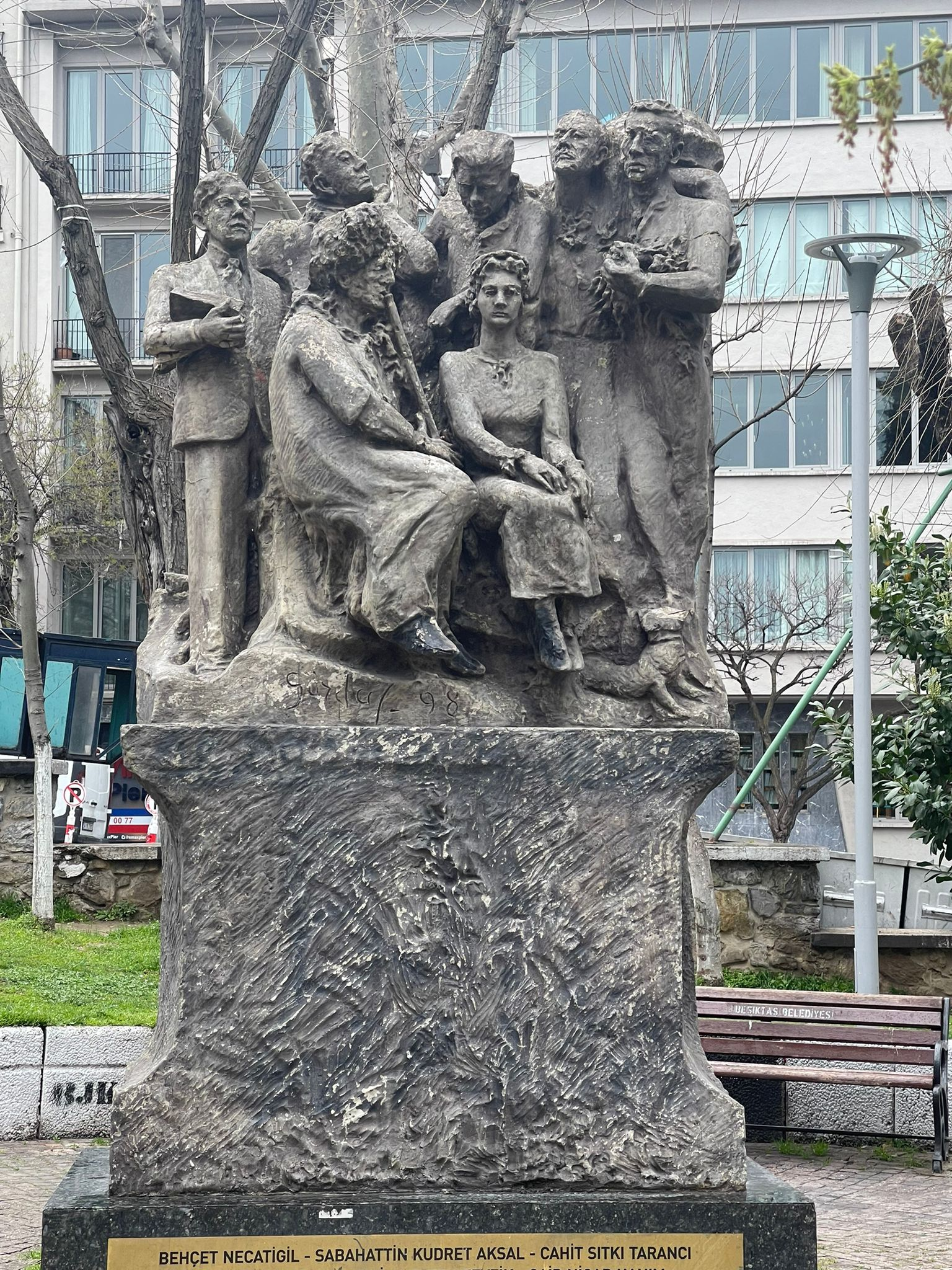
- The sculpture Şairler Sofası (1998) by Gürdal Duyar for which the park is named after. The sculpture depicts the poets Behçet Necatigil, Sabahattin Kudret Aksal, Cahit Sıtkı Tarancı, Oktay Rıfat, Orhan Veli, Neyzen Tevfik and Nigâr Hanım.
- Interactive map of Hallway of Poets
- Type: Urban park
- Location: Vişnezade, Beşiktaş, Istanbul, Turkey
- Coordinates: 41°04′21″N 29°00′03″E
- Created: 1998
- Designer: Gürdal Duyar (sculpture); Erhan İşözen (park)

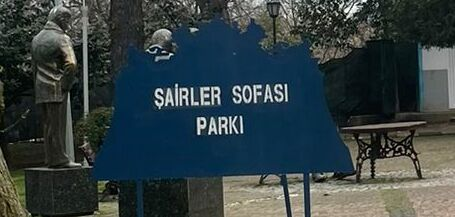
One of the entrances of the park with its name on the board

A part of Beşiktaş Vişnezade Park is oriented under the name "Şairler Sofası". Şairler Sofası is the 1998 sculpture by Gürdal Duyar whose name the park goes by. The depicted characters in the sculpture as well as the figures depicted in the other sculptures in the greater park are 19th and 20th century poets who have mostly lived in and around Beşiktaş. In the sculpture Şairler Sofası, Duyar has composed it such that the poets are "hand in hand" and "shoulder to shoulder". It includes the poets Behçet Necatigil, Sabahattin Kudret Aksal, Cahit Sıtkı Tarancı, Oktay Rıfat, Orhan Veli, Neyzen Tevfik and Nigâr Hanım together in one composition. The Architectural design of the park was done by Erhan İşözen. The park was opened in 1998 together with the first sculptures. at the inauguration of the park the mayor of Beşiktaş, Ayfer Atay, said that the park will be a place where books will be signed and poems will be read. The park has become a place where more poets and other members of Turkish society were honored with monuments over the years.

== The Sculptures ==
On the inauguration of the park in 1998, the park featured sculptures by Gürdal Duyar, Yunus Tonkuş and Namık Denizhan. Later on over the years new sculptures by them, and other sculptors, have been added to the park.

Year	Depicted Poet(s)	Name	Sculptor
1998	Behçet Necatigil Sabahattin Kudret Aksal Cahit Sıtkı Tarancı Oktay Rıfat Orhan Veli Neyzen Tevfik Nigâr Hanım	Şairler Sofası	Gürdal Duyar
1998	Nigar Hanım		Namık Denizhan
1998	Neyzen Tevfik		Namık Denizhan
1998	Behçet Necatigil		Namık Denizhan
1998	Orhan Veli Kanık		Namık Denizhan
1998	Melih Cevdet Anday		Metin Yurdanur
1998	Oktay Rıfat		Namık Denizhan
1998	Sabahattin Kudret Aksal		Yunus Tonkuş
1998	Özdemir Asaf	Özdemir Asaf Heykeli	Namık Denizhan
2002	Necati Cumalı	Necati Cumalı	Gürdal Duyar
	Cahit Külebi		
2016	Ataol Behramoğlu	Ataol Behramoğlu Heykeli	Ali Yaldır Zafer Dağdeviren Derya Ersoy
2017	Alâeddin Yavaşça		
1998	Cahit Sıtkı Tarancı	Cahit Sıtkı Tarancı	Namık Demizhan
	Süleyman Seba		Neslihan Pala

Following the death of Necati Cumalı in 2001 a sculpture of Cumalı by Gürdal Duyar was added to the park in 2002. Since the initial opening of the park the sculptures of the poets Süleyman Seba by Neslihan Pala has also been added. On 13 April 2016 the sculpture of Ataol Behramoğlu was inaugurated. It was sculpted by Ali Yaldır, Zafer Dağdeviren and Derya Ersoy. In 2017 the sculpture of Alâeddin Yavaşça was erected. At some point a sculpture of Cahit Külebi has also been added.

=== Photos ===
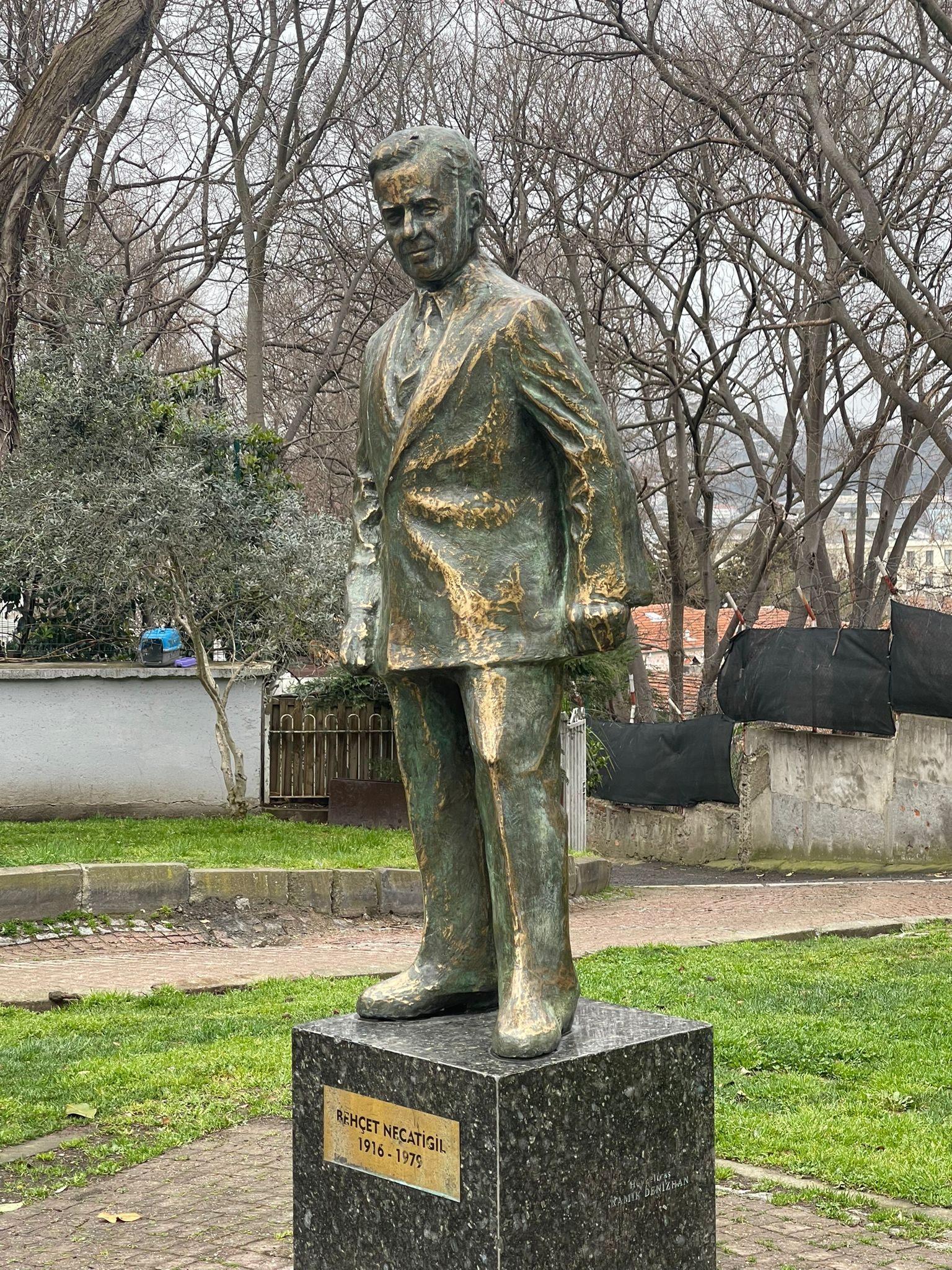
Sculpture of Behçet Necatigil by Namık Denizhan

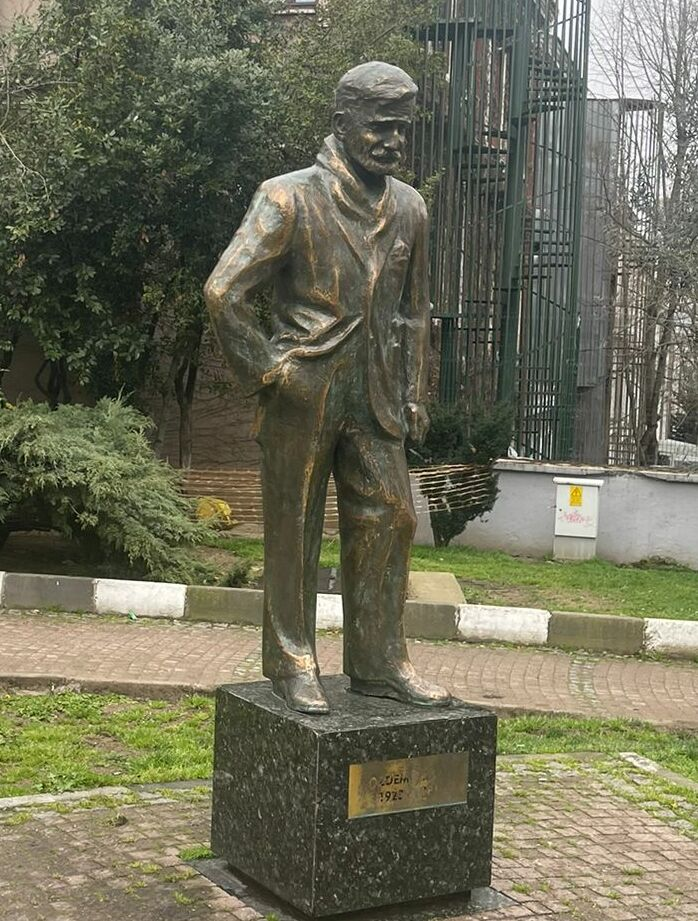
Sculpture of Özdemir Asaf by Namık Denizhan

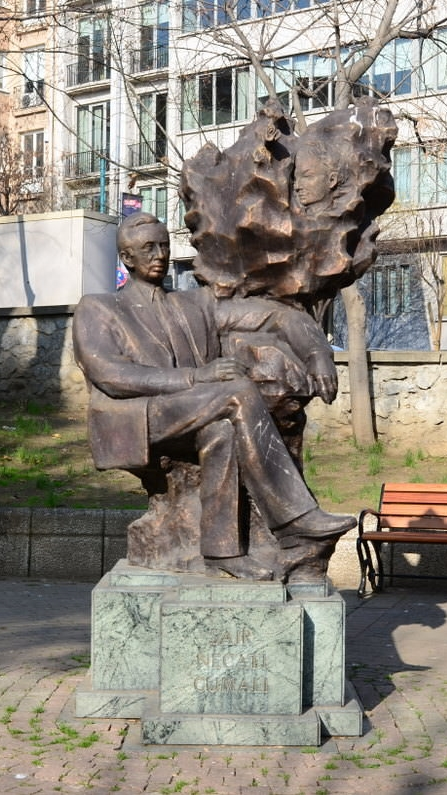
Sculpture of Necati Cumalı by Gürdal Duyar

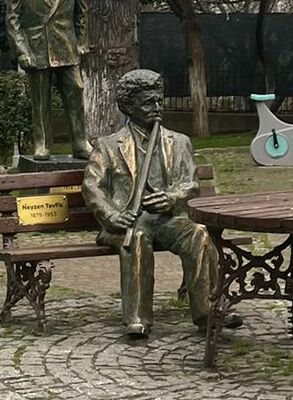
Sculpture of Neyzen Tevfik by Namık Denizhan

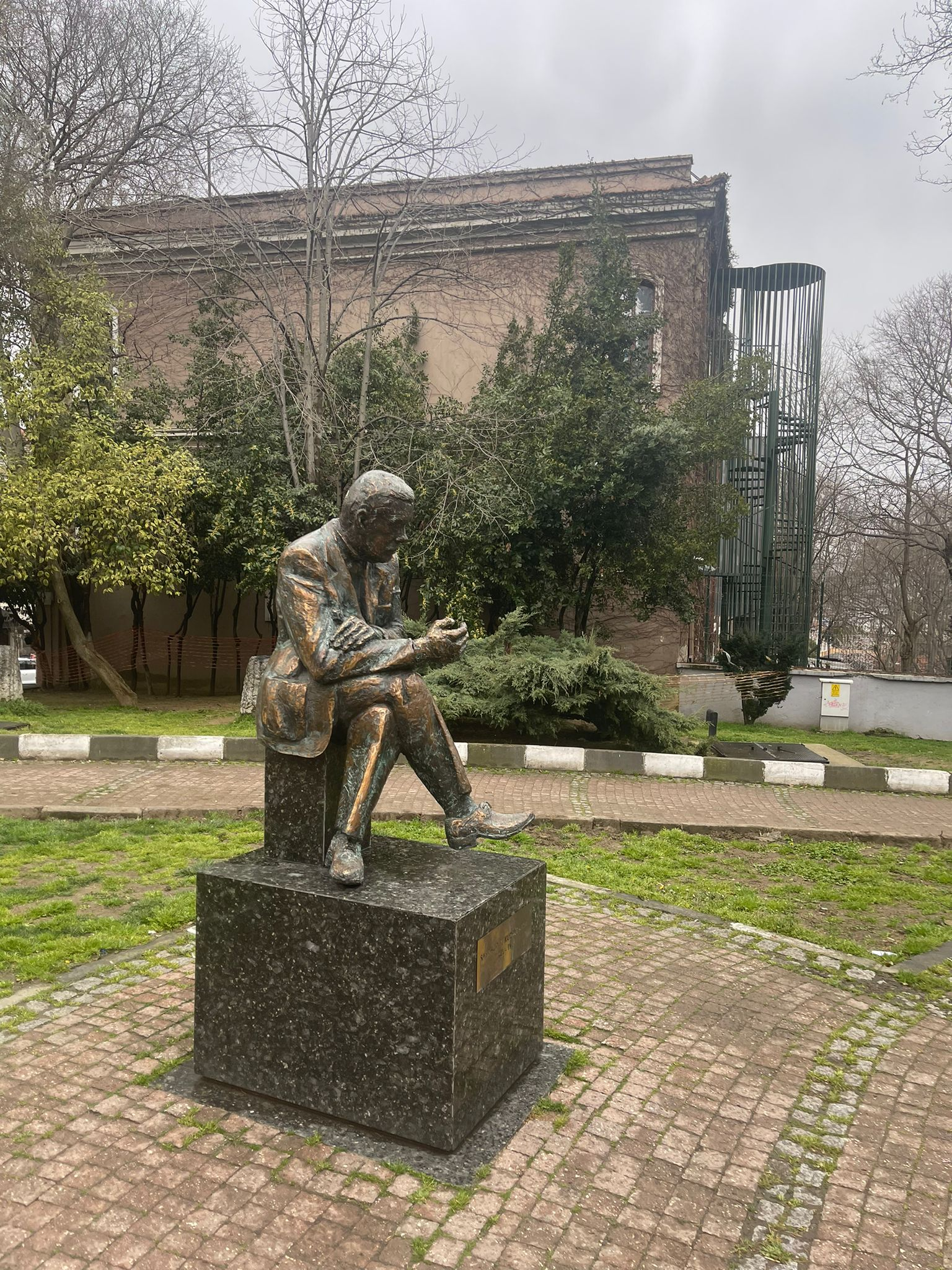
Sculpture of Sabahattin Kudret Aksal by Yunus Tonkuş

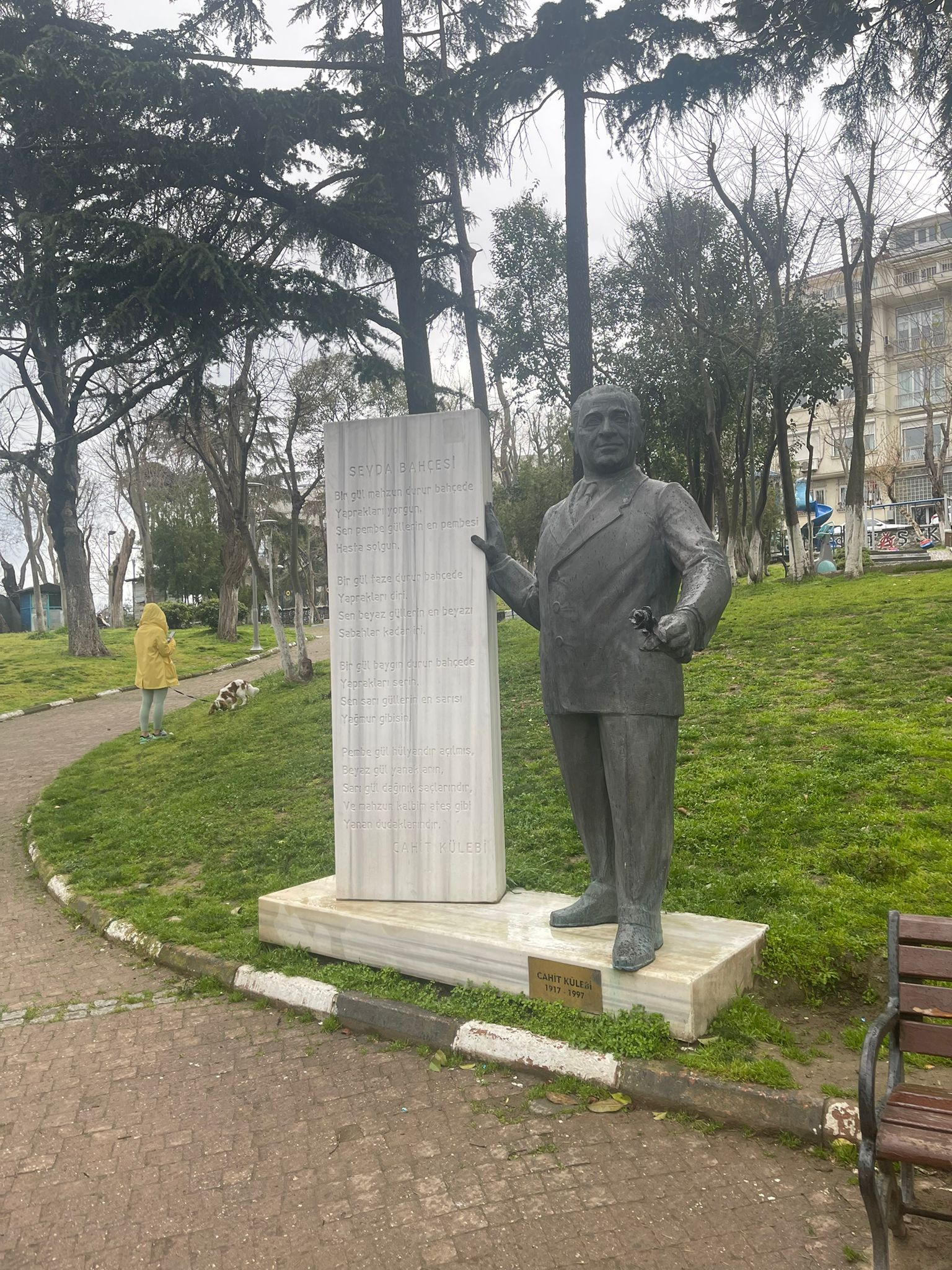
Sculpture of Cahit Külebi

== See also ==
- List of public art in Istanbul

== Sources ==
- Ertem, Raif (10 December 1998). "Şairler Sofası'nda Beşiktaş'ta" [At the Şairler Sofa in Beşiktaş]. Rasgele (in Turkish).
- Demir, Bülent (28 November 1998). "Akaret ler'de şairler parkı" [A Poets park in Akaretler] (PDF). Hürriyet Istanbul.
- Sezer, Sennur; Özyalçıner, Adnan (Oct 2010). Özmen, Gonca (ed.). Öyküleriyle İstanbul Anıtları [Istanbuls' Monuments Through their Stories]. II (in Turkish) (1 ed.). Beyoğlu/Istanbul: Evrensel Basim Yayin. ISBN 9786053312628 – via books.google.com.
- Demir, Bülent (13 January 2002). "Necati Cumalı heykeli Beşiktaş'ta" [The Necati Cumalı sculpture is in Beşiktaş] (in Turkish). NTV.
