= Erol Güney =

Turkish-Israeli journalist, translator and author

- Born: Mikhael Rottenberg; 29 August 1914; Odessa, Russian Empire
- Died: 12 October 2009 (aged 95); Tel Aviv, Israel
- Education: Istanbul University
- Occupations: Journalist, translator, writer

Erol Güney (born Mikhael Rottenberg; 29 August 1914 – 12 October 2009) was a Turkish-Israeli journalist, translator and author. He is known for translating Western classics into Turkish in the 1940s, including those of Fyodor Dostoyevsky, Anton Chekhov and Molière. He was deported from Turkey in the 1950s due to an article that he wrote about the Soviet Union and emigrated to Israel in 1956, where he lived until his death in 2009.

== Biography ==
Güney was born Misha Rottenberg in Odessa, to a Ukrainian Jewish family. His family emigrated to Turkey following the October Revolution in 1917. He graduated from St. Joseph High School and studied philosophy at Istanbul University. During this time, he acquired Turkish citizenship and changed his name to Erol Güney.

In the 1940s, he joined a translation bureau led by then-Minister of Education Hasan Âli Yücel and Sabahattin Ali. Güney, who was fluent in Turkish, Russian, English, and French, translated various works of Western literature, including Chekhov's The Cherry Orchard and Gogol's The Government Inspector. During his time at the translation bureau, he befriended figures of Turkish literature, including Sabahattin Eyüboğlu, Azra Erhat, Cahit Külebi, Orhan Veli Kanık, Necati Cumalı, and Melih Cevdet Anday.

Following the demise of Turkey's one-party period and Hasan Âli Yücel's resignation, the translation bureau lost its function and Güney left it to focus on journalism. He began working for Agence France-Presse. In 1955, he was exiled to Yozgat due to an article he wrote about the Soviet Union. Later, his Turkish citizenship was revoked and he was deported to France. In 1956, he emigrated to Israel and settled in Tel Aviv.

Güney continued to work as a journalist in Israel. He also started writing for the Istanbul-based Jewish newspaper Şalom. He became Yedioth Ahronoth's Washington, D.C. correspondent in the 1980s. He was blacklisted from entering Turkey until 1990; he frequently visited Istanbul afterwards.

Güney was married to Dora Güney, who emigrated to Israel with him. Both were close friends of poet Orhan Veli Kanık, who dedicated a well-known poem cycle to Güney and his cat, Edibe. He also had a daughter with a Parisian woman.

Güney died in Tel Aviv in 2009.

== Works about Güney ==
- Oral, Haluk and M. Şeref Özsoy (2005). Erol Güney'in Ke(n)disi / Göçmen-Çevirmen-Gazeteci-Sevgili. Istanbul: Yapı Kredi Yayınları. ISBN 9750808924.
- Yaşamın Sürüklediği Yerde- Erol Güney’in Yaşam Öyküsü, a documentary by Sabiha Bânu Yalkut-Breddermann
