= Yaprak (magazine) =

Literary magazine in Turkey (1949–1951)

- Editor-in-chief: Orhan Veli Kanık
- Frequency: Biweekly
- Founder: Orhan Veli Kanık
- First issue: 1 January 1949
- Final issue: 1 February 1951
- Country: Turkey
- Based in: Ankara
- Language: Turkish

Yaprak (Turkish: Sheet) was a biweekly magazine published in Ankara, Turkey, between 1949 and 1951. It is known for its founder and editor-in-chief Orhan Veli Kanık, a Turkish poet. The title of the magazine was a reference to its format since it was published on a single sheet.

== History and profile ==
Yaprak was established by Orhan Veli Kanık and was first published on 1 January 1949. The magazine was headquartered in Ankara and came out biweekly. Its contributors were leading figures, including Sabahattin Eyüboğlu, Mahmut Dikerdem, Melih Cevdet Anday, Bedri Rahmi Eyüboğlu and Cahit Sıtkı Tarancı. Of them, Mahmut Dikerdem financed the magazine in the initial period. In addition to art-centered articles Yaprak covered social and political articles. It called for the release of Nazım Hikmet Ran who had been in prison. The last issue of the magazine appeared on 1 June 1950. A special issue was published on 1 February 1951 after the death of Orhan Veli Kanık. It produced a total of 29 issues during its lifetime.

The full issues of Yaprak were archived by TUSTAV.
