= Varlık =

Turkish literary magazine

- Categories: Literary magazine
- Frequency: Monthly
- Founder: Yaşar Nabi Nayır; Sabri Esat Siyavuşgil; Nahit Sırrı Örik
- Founded: 1933; 92 years ago
- First issue: 15 July 1933
- Country: Turkey
- Based in: Istanbul
- Language: Turkish

Varlık is a monthly Turkish literature and art magazine. Established by Yaşar Nabi Nayır, Sabri Esat Siyavuşgil, and Nahit Sırrı Örik in 1933, it often publishes poetry and works of famous Turkish poets and writers.

== History and profile ==
Varlık was first published as a biweekly magazine in Ankara on 15 July 1933. The owner of the magazine was Sabri Esat Siyavuşgil during the initial years. He was also the cofounder of the magazine. The other founders include Yaşar Nabi Nayır and Nahit Sırrı Örik. In 1946 the magazine moved to Istanbul. The same year the publisher of the magazine, Varlık Publications, was founded. Following the death of Yaşar Nabi Nayır in 1981 his daughter, Filiz Nayır, began to edit the magazine. From 1983 to 1990 the magazine was edited by Kemal Özer, a Turkish author and poet.

Varlık has a unique significance in Turkish literature. Most Turks who have become famous in literature have become so through publishing their works in Varlık, such as Sait Faik Abasıyanık. Significant contributors include Cahit Sıtkı Tarancı, Orhan Veli Kanık, Nurullah Ataç, Ziya Osman Saba, Oktay Akbal, Mahmut Makal, Necati Cumalı, Fazıl Hüsnü Dağlarca, Behçet Necatigil, Cahit Külebi, Orhan Kemal, Haldun Taner and Tahsin Yücel. The magazine also introduced Turkish translations of works by Dostoevsky, Turgenev, Gogol, Kafka, Tolstoy, Steinbeck, Hemingway, Balzac, Malraux, Zola, Gide, Camus and Sartre. Since 2001 the magazine has been a member of the Eurozine network.

== See also ==
- List of literary magazines
