= Neyzen Tevfik =

Turkish poet and satirist (1879-1953)

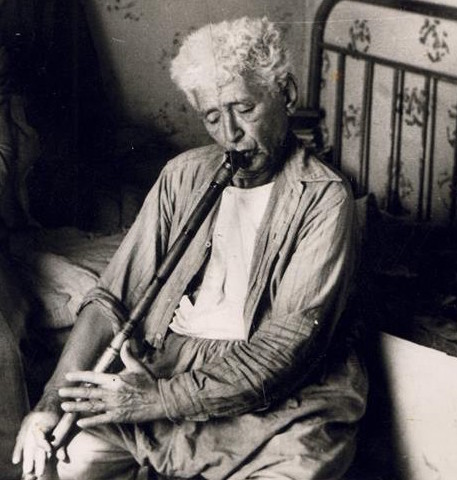
- Born: Tevfik Kolaylı; March 24, 1879; Muğla, Ottoman Empire
- Died: January 28, 1953 (aged 73); Istanbul, Turkey
- Occupations: Poet, satirist

Tevfik Kolaylı (March 24, 1879 – January 28, 1953), better known by his pen name Neyzen Tevfik (often misrendered as "Neyzen Teyfik"), was a Turkish poet, satirist, and neyzen (a "ney performer" in Turkish). Tevfik was born in Bodrum and died in Istanbul. In addition to his satire, he composed taksims and saz semais. He used satire against tyranny during the Ottoman period and against those who opposed revolutions during the Republic years. He wrote poems criticising injustice and corruption. He was frequently arrested.

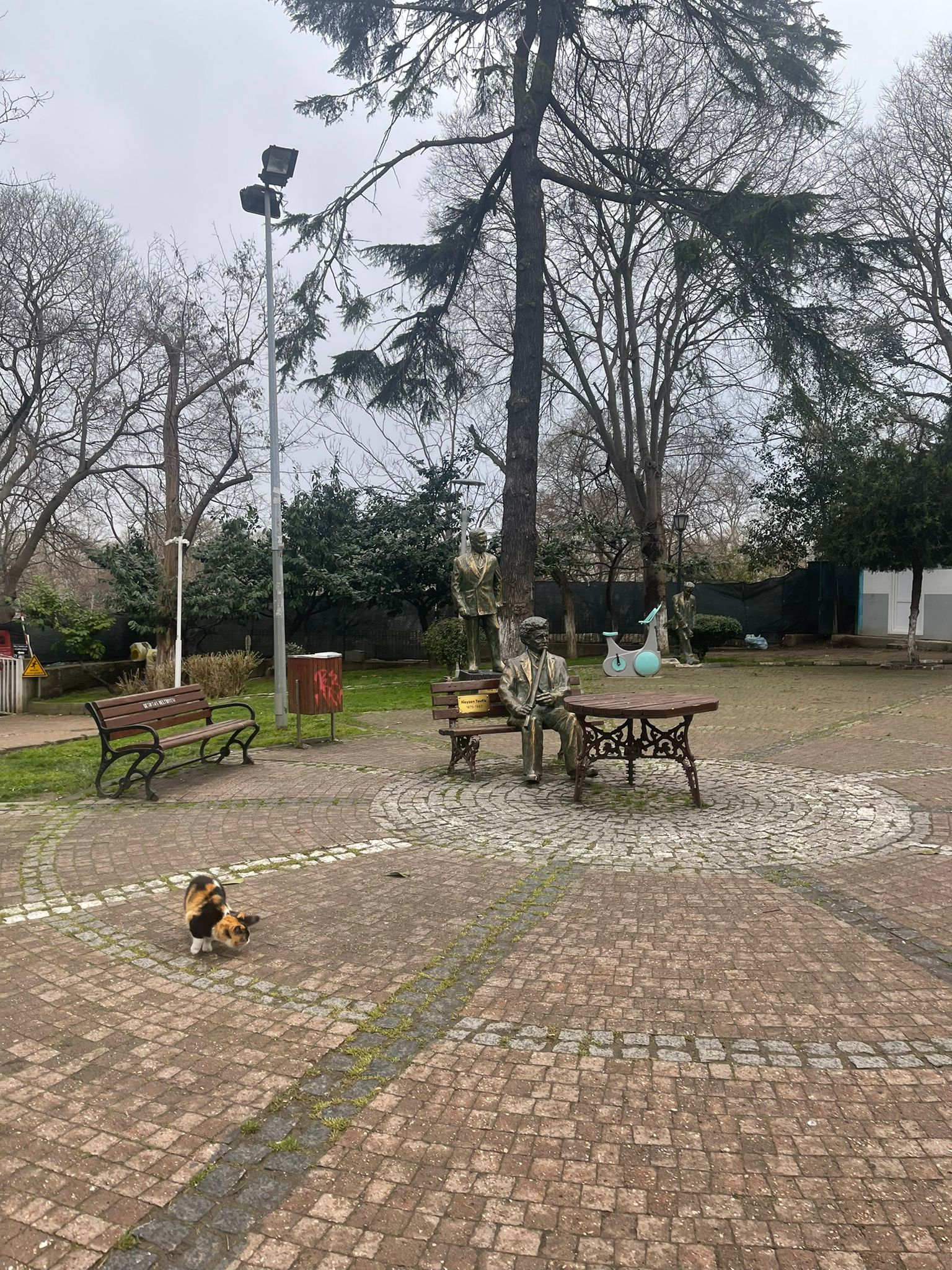
A bronze Neyzen Tevfik sits on a bench in the Şairler Sofası park in Vişnezade

== Biography ==
Tevfik learned Persian as a young man, and became a Mevlevi in İzmir. He then moved to Istanbul and continued his Mevlevi practice in Galata and Kasımpaşa. In 1902 he became a Bektashi dervish.

His interest in poetry influenced him into meeting with Mehmet Akif Ersoy. As was the case with many other intellectuals of his period, Tevfik's satirical poetry critical of the conservative sultan Abdul Hamid II resulted in his exile to Egypt in 1903, which he later visited again between 1908 and 1913.

Neyzen Tevfik's fame in popular Turkish culture is mainly due to his virtuosity with the ney. Moreover, he was also a heavy drinker while practicing a form of Islam as it was common among Bektashis. He therefore is also a symbol of a clash between the orthodox Islamic doctrine, and the Bektashi order that he was in, as illustrated in the following translation of his writing:

The disbeliever's book has neither beginning nor end. A few pages from its middle is all we ever grasp. For religion's sake and fear of blasphemy we endure woe. Reason cannot perceive where righteousness may go.

His religious views were highly mixed and tend to change in accordance with his mood. Yet, in his last years, he wrote a poem "Türk'e Birinci Öğüt" (First counsel to the Turk) in which a verse, regarding religious institutions mentioned before the verse, says:

"Varsa aslı bunların alemde siksinler beni." (If any of these are true, well, fuck me.)

Therefore, he can be considered a radical, if not directly atheist or non-theistic.

Yet, in a scholarly article that takes into account his overall life, including final utterings, shows that he was a genuine believer even though he criticized superficial religiosity:

"Hayatında kendisine maddî imkânlar sağlayacak kişilere iltifat etmemiş, bildiği ve inandığı gibi yaşamıştır. “Felsefemde yok ötem, ben çünki sırr-ı vâhidim / Cem‘-i kesrette yekûnen sıfr-ı mutlak olmuşum / Yokluğumla âşikârım, Ehl-i beyt’e âidim / Secdemin şeklindeki ism-i Muhammed şâhidim” mısraları ve ölümüne çok yakın bir zamanda kendisini ziyarete gelen Cemalettin Server’e söylediği, “Şahit ol Server, ben şuurlu bir müminim” sözü onun dinî inancı hakkında bir kanaat verir.".

Tevfik is featured in the sculptor Gürdal Duyars monument Şairler Sofası together with 6 other poets. Elsewhere in the same park, another sculpture of him by Namık Denizhan sits on a bench.

He belonged to the Bektashi Lodge and spent much of his life in inns in Istanbul. In his later years, he stayed in the 21st ward at Bakırköy Mental Hospital. He did not have a regular income, other than the monthly pension he received for a short time in the 1930s. Tevfik was epileptic. He drank lot of alcohol, especially Rakı.

== Poetry ==
- Hiç, 1919
- Dilara'ya Maktuplar ,1953
- "Azab-ı Mukaddes", 1949

== Music ==
- Nihavent Saz Semaisi
- Şehnazbuselik Saz Semaisi
- Taksimler, taş plak.
