= Oktay Rifat =

Turkish writer and playwright

- Born: Ali Oktay Rifat; 10 June 1914; Trabzon, Ottoman Empire
- Died: 18 April 1988 (aged 73); Istanbul, Turkey

Ali Oktay Rifat (10 June 1914 – 18 April 1988) was a Turkish writer and playwright, and one of the forefront poets of modern Turkish poetry since the late 1930s. He was the founder of the Garip movement, together with Orhan Veli and Melih Cevdet.

Oktay Rifat had a great influence on modern Turkish poetry, standing outside traditional poetic conventions and creating a new movement.

== Early life ==
Oktay Rifat was born on 10 June 1914 in the city of Trabzon, son of poet and linguist Samih Rifat, who was also governor of Trabzon.

He was raised in a family that included many artists and writers. His great-grandfather Macar Hurşid Bey was a composer well versed in both Turkish and western music, and his grandfather Colonel Hasan Rıfat Bey was interested in poetry.

He graduated from Ankara Erkek Lisesi (Ankara High School) in 1932, and while he was a student of Ahmet Hamdi Tanpınar in high school, he wrote his first poems. He completed a Bachelor of Law from the University of Ankara but he did not lose his interest in literature and his passion for writing. In 1937, he was appointed to Paris, France by the State Ministry to do his PhD, however came back after three years without completing his degree due to outbreak of World War II.

He moved to Istanbul in 1955, and started to work as a legal adviser for the Turkish State Railways in 1961. He retired in 1973, and died in Istanbul on 18 April 1988. He was interred at Karacaahmet Cemetery in Üsküdar district of Istanbul.

== Career ==
Oktay Rifat started writing poetry as a high school student, and his first poems were published between 1936 and 1944 in the literature journal Varlık (Existence).

In 1941, together with his friends Orhan Veli Kanık and Melih Cevdet Anday, he published the famous book Garip, which formed the first example of the Garip, or 'Strange' movement.

His poems, which use all the richness of his native Turkish language, include Karga ile Tilki (The Crow and the Fox), for which he won the Yeditepe Poetry Prize in 1955. His work rejected older, complex forms, favouring simplicity and fresh rhythms.

Oktay Rifat also published novels such as Bir Kadının Penceresinden (Through a Woman’s Window) and Danaburnu (Calf Nose), theatre plays such as Kadınlar Arasında (Among Women, first staged in 1948) and translated older works into Turkish from Latin and Greek.

== Bibliography ==
- Garip (with Orhan Veli and Melih Cevdet, 1941)
- Yaşayıp Ölmek Aşk ve Avarelik Üstüne Şiirler (1945)
- Güzelleme (1945)
- Aşağı Yukarı (1952)
- Karga ile Tilki (1954)
- Perçemli Sokak (1956)
- Âşık Merdiveni (1958)
- İkilik (Aşağı Yukarı ve Karga ile Tilki'nin ikinci baskısı,1963)
- Elleri Var Özgürlüğün (1966)
- Şiirler (1969)
- Yeni Şiirler (1973)
- Çobanıl Şiirler (1976)
- Bir Kadının Penceresinden (1976)
- Bir Cıgara İçimi (1979)
- Elifli (1980)
- Danaburnu (1980)
- Denize Doğru Konuşma (1982)
- Dilsiz ve Çıplak (1984)
- Koca Bir Yaz (1987)
- Bütün Şiirleri (1991)

== Awards ==
- 1954 Yeditepe Poetry Award – for Karga ile Tilki
- 1970 Turkish Language Institute Poetry Award – for his book Şiirler (Poems)
- 1970 Ankara ArtLovers Foundation Best Play of the Year and TRT Art Awards Competition Best Talent Award for his theatre play called Yağmur Sıkıntısı (Oppressive Air)
- 1980 Sedat Simavi Foundation Award – for poetry in the book Bir Cigara İçimi (Smoking a Cigarette)
- 1984 Necatigil Poetry Award- for his book Dilsiz ve Çıplak' (Mute and Naked)
- 1980 Madaralı Roman Award – for his novel Danaburnu

In 1998 he was honored with monuments in Istanbul. These include a statue made by Namık Denizhan and as an inclusion in the parks main sculpture, Gürdal Duyars' Şairler Sofası. Both artworks were erected in the Şairler Sofası Park in Istanbul and inaugurated in 1998 with opening of the park.
