= Garip =

Turkish poetry movement

For people with the surname, see Garip (surname).

Garip movement, Garipçiler or First New Movement; is a literary movement founded by Orhan Veli Kanık, Oktay Rifat, and Melih Cevdet Anday that rejects the established understanding in Turkish poetry and emphasizes the beauty of expression.

== History ==
=== Emergence ===
Orhan Veli Kanık, Oktay Rifat, and Melih Cevdet Anday, who were educated at Ankara Atatürk High School, returned to Ankara after completing their higher education in 1936, marking the trio's return to literature. The translations of Raymond Radiguet's Butterfly poem and Orhan Veli's Saksılar poem in the 101st issue of Varlık magazine, which they started publishing in 1936, are considered the first examples of this genre.

=== Periods of Garip Poetry ===
Period	Years	Note
I. Period	1937–1941	This period lasted from the first poems published in Varlık magazine until the publication of the Garip.
II. Period	1941–1945	This period lasted until 1945, when the three leading poets returned to literature after their military service.
III. Period	1945–1949	This period saw the three poets working independently.
IV. Period	1949–1950	This period continued as long as the Yaprak magazine.

==== I. Period ====
The period in which the first examples were given with the Butterfly and Saksılar poems in 1937. During this period, there was no consensus on the principles of the movement.

==== Garip ====
It is the first poetry book published by the three poets on Orhan Veli's recommendation. The preface of the book expresses their common views on poetry and outlines the principles of the Garip movement for the first time. According to them, embellishing or abstracting the expression harms the meaning.

The preface of the book differs between the first and second editions, showing Orhan Veli Kanık's changes in opinion.

Author	Number of Poems
Melih Cevdet	16
Oktay Rıfat	21
Orhan Veli	24
Toplam	61

Some of the 61 poems published in the book were previously published in periodicals such as Varlık magazine.

==== II. Period ====
This period, which started with the writing of the Garip book, ended with the trio distancing themselves from literature due to their military service.

===== III. Period =====
During this period, which began after the trio returned from military service, they started to act individually rather than together.

Author	Works
Orhan Veli	Vazgeçemediğim
Oktay Rıfat	Yaşayıp Ölmek, Aşk ve Avarelik Üstüne Şiirler
Melih Cevdet	Rahatı Kaçan Ağaç

==== IV. Period ====
This period revolves around the Yaprak magazine, in which the three writers were on the editorial board. This period ended a few months after the publication of the 28th issue of the magazine when Orhan Veli died.

==== After the Garip Movement ====
The Mavi magazine, around which writers opposing the syllabic meter gathered, was started by Teoman Civelek, Ülkü Arman, Güner Sümer, and Bekir Çiftçi in 1952. Later, Attila İlhan, Ahmet Oktay, and Yılmaz Gruda also published their works in this magazine. These writers later adopted a movement known as Mavi movement. The Mavi movement paved the way for the Second New Movement.

== Form ==
In the Garip foreword, the following views are mentioned:

- The interaction between different art forms should be opposed.
- Harmony in poetry can be achieved without rhythm and rhyme.
- All kinds of meaning and figures of speech should be abandoned in poetry.

Works were created in a manner that emphasized meaning, in reaction to syllabic meter poets, Nazım Hikmet's socialist realist political poetry, and Ahmet Haşim's pure poetry approach. They rejected the notion of poeticism.

It is claimed that the movement shares many similarities with Japanese haiku poetry and that Orhan Veli encountered Eastern poetry, particularly Japanese haiku, while translating Kikaku's poems from French to Turkish.

The Garipçiler are the only group in Turkish literature to adopt the dadaism movement.
