= Yıldız Moran =

Turkish photographer

Yıldız Moran (née Arun; 24 July 1932 – 15 April 1995) was a Turkish photographer who was active from 1950 to 1962. Her work has posthumously been shown in solo exhibitions at Pera Museum and at İstanbul Modern in Istanbul, and is held in the collection of the latter.

== Life and work ==
Moran attended Robert College in Istanbul, leaving in her senior year. Following the advice of her uncle, art historian Mazhar Şevket İpşiroğlu, she then moved to the UK and studied photography first at Bloomsbury Technical College and then at Ealing Technical College in London.

She was active as a photographer from 1950 to 1962, when she gave up photography to pursue lexicography.

Moran married poet Özdemir Asaf in 1963 and had three children in four years.

== Publications ==
- Fotoğrafcı. Istanbul: Adam, 1998. ISBN 975-418-508-5. Exhibition catalogue.
- Yıldız Moran: Zamansız Fotoğraflar / Timeless Photographs. Istanbul: Pera Museum, 2013. ISBN 978-605-4642-20-5. Exhibition catalogue. Text in Turkish and English.
- Yıldız Moran. Eczacıbaşı Photographers Series. Istanbul: Eczacıbaşi, 2017. Edited by Merih Akoğul. ISBN 978-605-61665-7-0. A retrospective. Text in Turkish and English.

== Exhibitions ==
- Timeless Photographs, Pera Museum, Istanbul, Turkey, 2013/14
- Yıldız Moran: A Mountain Tale, İstanbul Modern, Istanbul, Turkey, 2019

== Collections ==
Moran's work is held in the following permanent collection:

- İstanbul Modern, Istanbul, Turkey
