= Mahmut Dikerdem =

Turkish diplomat and writer (1916–1993)

Ambassador of Turkey to India
- In office 1968–1976

Ambassador of Turkey to Ghana
- In office 1964–1968

Ambassador of Turkey to Iran
- In office 1959–1960

Ambassador of Turkey to Jordan
- In office 1957–1959

Personal details
- Born: Mahmut Şerafettin; 6 January 1916 Istanbul, Ottoman Empire
- Died: 3 October 1993 (aged 77) Istanbul, Turkey
- Resting place: Karacaahmet cemetery, Istanbul
- Children: 2
- Education: Istanbul University

Mahmut Dikerdem (1916–1993) was a Turkish diplomat, writer and peace activist. He served as ambassador of Turkey in Jordan, Iran, Ghana, and India. He is known for being the founder and president of the Turkish Peace Association which was banned shortly before the military coup in Turkey on 12 September 1980.

== Early life and education ==
He was born Mahmut Şerafettin in Istanbul on 6 January 1916. His father, Şerif Bey, was an ethnic Kurd from Palu, Elazığ. Şerif Bey was a sergeant working in the rural police. He was appointed to a security post in Ereğli, Zonguldak, and married there a Turkish woman named Seniye Hanım whose father was the owner of the Çamlıca coal mine. Then they settled in Istanbul where they lived in Kadıköy. They had four children, and Mahmut was their youngest child. He had two sisters and a brother. His eldest sister was born in Ereğli and was the mother of the journalist Mehmet Ali Birand. His father died in 1924 when he was eight.

Dikerdem was one of the scholarship students at Galatasaray High School and graduated from it in 1935. One of his classmates at the high school was Haldun Taner who was a writer. Dikerdem obtained a degree in law from Istanbul University in 1938. He received his PhD in law in Geneva, Switzerland.

== Career and activities ==
Dikerdem joined the Ministry of Foreign Affairs in 1939 and worked there until his early retirement in 1976. The reason for his early retirement was the formation of the first National Front coalition government consisting of the Justice Party headed by Süleyman Demirel, the National Salvation Party headed by Necmettin Erbakan and the Nationalist Movement Party led by Alparslan Türkeş. Dikerdem held various posts at the Ministry such as director general of the Middle East and Cyprus Department between 1955 and 1957. In this capacity he was among the members of the Turkish delegation in the meetings on Cyprus held in London between 29 August and 6 September 1955. He was named as the ambassador of Turkey to Jordan in 1957 at the age of 41 becoming the youngest ambassador of Turkey. He was in office until late 1959 when he was appointed ambassador of Turkey to Iran. Immediately after the military coup on 27 May 1960 Dikerdem's term ended. In 1964 he was appointed ambassador of Turkey to Ghana which he held until 1968 when he was named as the ambassador of Turkey to India.

During his term at the Ministry he wrote for various publications such as Akşam newspaper and Yaprak magazine (1948–1950) using pseudonyms. His articles in Akşam were about foreign policy whereas his articles in Yaprak were on literature and arts. From 1960 he continued to publish articles in Yön, Öncü, and Forum.

After his retirement from diplomatic post in 1976 Dikerdem contributed to the newspapers Politika, Milliyet and Cumhuriyet. He published several books. His first book was entitled Bir Büyükelçinin Anıları (Turkish: Memoirs of an Ambassador) which was published in 1977. His other books included Hariciye Çarkı: Anılar (1989; Turkish: Wheel of Foreign Affairs: Memories), Ortadoğu’da Devrim Yılları (1990; Turkish: Years of Revolution in the Middle East), Direnenler: Barışın Savunmasıdır (1990; Turkish: Those Who Resist: Defense of Peace) and Barış Sosyalizm Yazıları (1991; Turkish: Peace Socialism Writings).

Dikerdem was elected to the presidential council of the World Peace Council in 1980, being its second Turkish member after Nazım Hikmet.

=== Peace Association and arrest ===
Dikerdem and other leftist figures established the Turkish Peace Association on 4 April 1977. He was elected as its president and served in the post for three terms. Shortly before the military coup on 12 September 1980 the Association was disbanded by the Istanbul martial law command on 5 September. Dikerdem and other members of the Association, including Orhan Apaydın, Orhan Taylan, Uğur Kökden, Şefik Asan, Niyazi Dalyancı, Ali Sirmen, Metin Özek, Mustafa Gazalcı, Haluk Tosun, İsmail Hakkı Öztorun, Kemal Anadol, Reha İsvan and Aykut Göker were arrested on 26 February 1982. Dikerdem was charged of making communist propaganda and of supporting strikes by workers. In November 1984 he was sentenced to eight-year imprisonment. He had been diagnosed with cancer during his detention in 1982 and was transferred from Maltepe military prison to Cerrahpaşa hospital before the announcement of the verdict. He was released in 1985 and was acquitted of all the charges against him in 1991.

When Dikerdem was in prison he was nominated for the Nobel Peace Prize in 1984, being the first Turkish citizen to be nominated. The European Parliament issued a resolution in October 1984 asking the immediate release of Dikerdem due to his deteriorating health.

=== Views ===
Dikerdem had a Marxist political stance. In his articles published in Cumhuriyet he argued that both Turkey and Cyprus should be demilitarized and that Turkey should follow a nonalignment strategy. Unlike other Turkish Marxists and socialists, he continued to support socialism after the collapse of the Soviet Union in 1991.

== Personal life and death ==
Dikerdem married twice and had two sons. He was diagnosed with prostate cancer in July 1982 when he was in prison. He died in Istanbul on 3 October 1993 and was buried there in Karacaahmet cemetery.
