= Ataol Behramoğlu =

Turkish poet, author, and Russian-into-Turkish literary translator (born 1942)

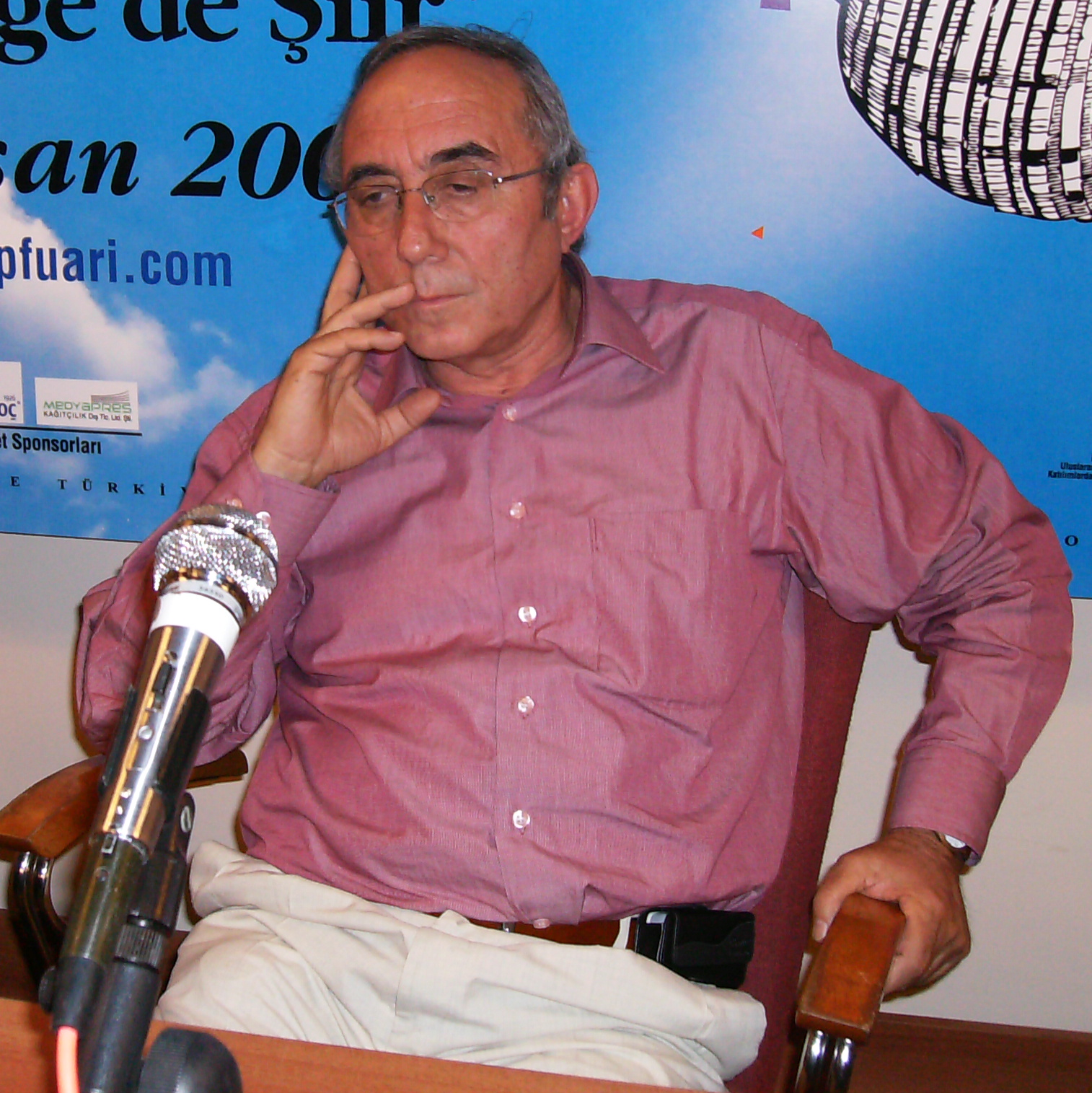
- Ataol Behramoğlu at a book fair in 2008
- Born: April 13, 1942 (age 84); Çatalca, Turkey
- Education: Ankara University
- Occupations: Poet, writer, translator
- Website: www.ataolbehramoglu.com.tr

Ataol Behramoğlu (born April 13, 1942) is a Turkish poet, author, and Russian-into-Turkish literary translator.

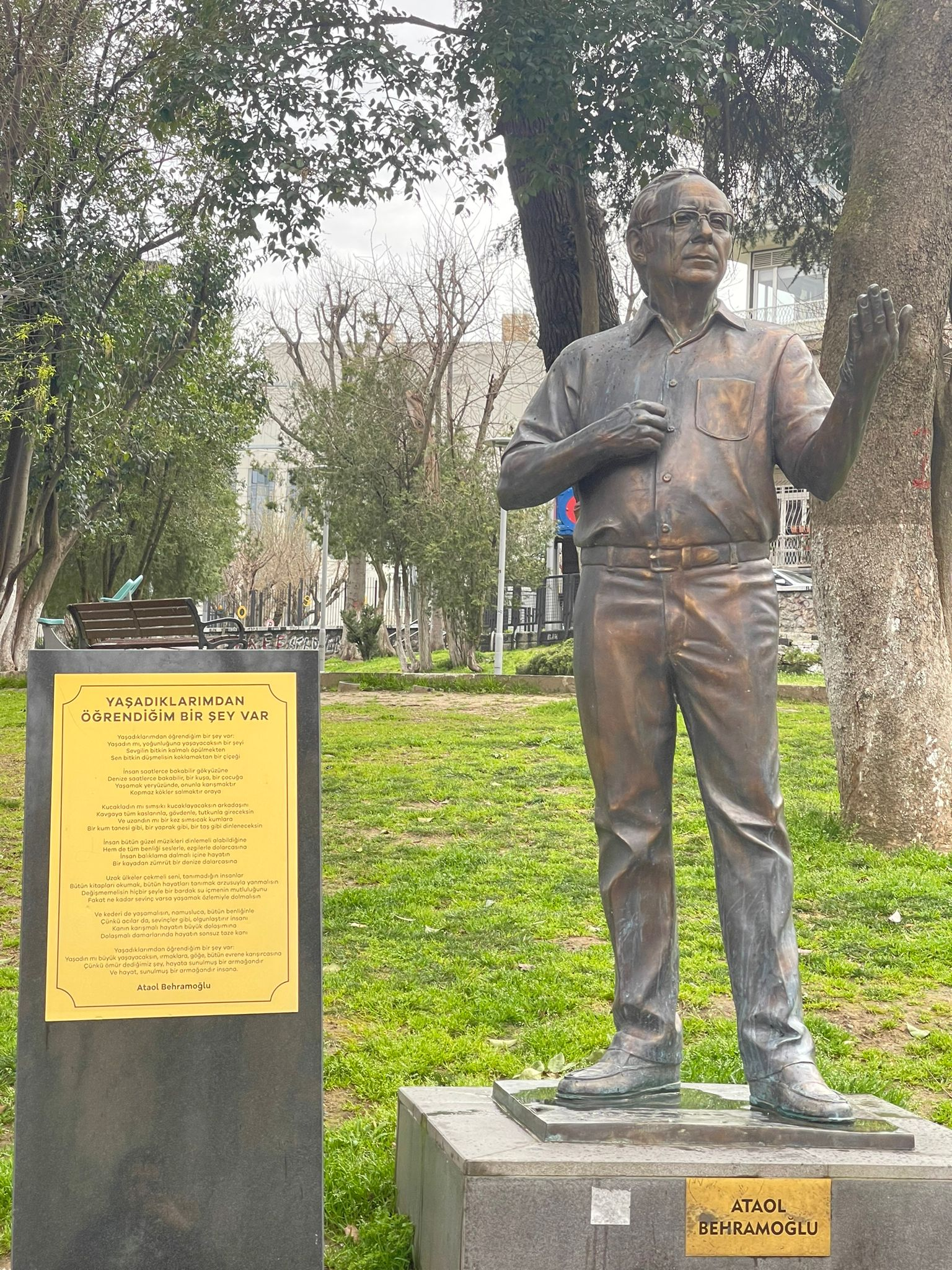
Sculpture of Behramoğlu in Şairler Sofası Park (Poets Park) in Maçka, Istanbul

== Life ==
Behramoğlu was born on April 13, 1942, in Istanbul. He wrote poems in honour of his father Hikmet Bahramoglu, originally from Azerbaijan, under the name "Bahramoglu". However, his first name was Ataol Gorus in honour of the Goris region where his father grew up.

Behramoğlu graduated from the Department of Russian Language and Literature at the University of Ankara in 1966. In 1970, he published his second book of verse, "One Day Definitely". Reprinted many times, this collection of poems was well received as a synthesis of the poetic tradition of Nazim Hikmet (1902-1963) with elements of symbolism and surrealism thrown in. Behramoğlu was among the contributors of the literary magazine Papirüs which was edited by Cemal Süreya.

He was asked to read his poems before packed audiences of students. In the autumn of 1970, he left Turkey to travel abroad to expand his studies of language and literature and lived in London and Paris until the autumn of 1972. In Paris, he met Pablo Neruda and Louis Aragon and fragments of "One Day Definitely" were published in Les Lettres Françaises, edited by Aragon. He participated in the founding of the Theatre de Liberté based in Paris and wrote texts for the "Légendes à Venir", the group's first performance. During this period, his translations of Alexander Pushkin’s Collected Novels and Short Stories (two volumes), the short stories of Maxim Gorky and the plays of Anton Chekhov were published in Turkey.

Between November 1972 and June 1974, he worked as a research assistant in Moscow State University's Faculty of Russian Philology, as the Chair of Russian and Soviet Literature. His third book of poetry, called "Poems of the Road, Longing, Courage and Struggle", was published in Turkey in 1974. During the 70’s, other collections of poems came out: "Neither Rain…Nor Poems" (1976), "During the Siege" (1978), "The Epic of Moustapha Suphi" (1979) and "Quatrains" (1980). During a trip to Greece in 1977, he met Yiannis Ritsos. With the return of democracy to Turkey, he returned to his country and worked as a dramaturge at the Istanbul Municipal Theatre.

=== 1980 Turkish coup d'état ===
Following the coup d'état on September 12, 1980, he was forced to resign from his post at the Istanbul Municipal Theatre and a new edition of his "Neither Rain… Nor Poems", published in 1981, was confiscated. Behramoğlu was detained and kept in custody for some time. In 1981, he collected a series of humorous and critical poems under the title "Wanted: A Good Citizen" and set these to music for a cabaret act. This work of political satire was staged several times and regarded as one of the first examples of Turkish political cabaret. A selection of Behramoğlu’s poetry was translated into Greek and published by Sinhroni Epohi along with a laudatory piece by Ritsos (1981). Well received in Greece, the book went through three reprints in two years. In Istanbul he published his own translations of poems by Louis Aragon (1897-1982), Bertolt Brecht (1898-1956), Attila József (1905-1937), Federico García Lorca (1898-1936), José Martí (1853-1895), Vladimir Mayakovsky (1893-1936), Pablo Neruda (1904-1973), Sándor Petőfi (1823-1849), Alexander Pushkin (1799-1837), Yiannis Ritsos (1909-1990) and others under the title "Ballads of Brotherhood".

In March 1982 he was arrested along with the other executive committee members of the Turkish Peace Association. Behramoğlu was kept under atrocious conditions in Maltepe Military Prison until November 1982, when they were conditionally released. He was awarded the Lotus Prize for Literature by the Afro-Asian Writers' Union in 1982. In November 1983, at a session of the Turkish Peace Association's trial, he was sentenced in absentia to eight years hard labour followed by thirty-two months of domestic exile which forced him to leave his country.

In 1984 he began to participate in the work of the Sorbonne’s National Institute for Oriental Languages and Civilisations at the Centre for Comparative Poetry in Paris . He represented Turkey at an International Poetry Festival organised in Rotterdam. In 1985, Behramoğlu was awarded an M.A. degree (Diplômes D’études Approfondies/D.E.A) from the Centre for Comparative Poetry for his work on the poetry of Nazım Hikmet and Vladimir Mayakovsky. In the same year, two new books of his poetry were published in Turkish in Germany: "Turkey, My Sad Country, My Beautiful Land" and "Letters to My Daughter". In 1986, the French language Turkish literary and cultural magazine Anka began publishing under his direction. In 1986 his essays and polemics about the problems of poetry were published under the title of "A Living Poetry". In 1987/88 his "Epic of Mustapha Suphi" was staged by the Turkish Theatre Group in Exile and restaged in several other European cities. At the Avignon Theatre Festival, it was acclaimed as the first play in Turkish (1989). While Behramoğlu was reading his poems and giving lectures to Turkish and other audiences in countries from Australia to Finland, his "The Anthology of Turkish Poetry of the Last Century" and "The Anthology of Russian Poetry" were published in Istanbul, after he had worked on them since the start of the 1980s. In 1988, a selection of his poems was translated and published in Hungary by the "Europa" Publishing House.

=== Return home ===
Finally acquitted of all accusations, he returned to Turkey in 1989. There he published his collected poems in three volumes (1991-1992), continuously reediting them. "Be Happy Nazım", a musical based on the later years of Nazım Hikmet's life, based on the memories of Hikmet's widow Vera Tulyakova and Hiket's own poems, was performed several times in Turkey and abroad. In 1992 Lozan, a documentary musical commenting on the historical events in Lausanne after the Turkish War of Independence, was performed by the Turkish State Theatre in Antalya and Istanbul (1993).

He worked as the president of the Turkish Writers Syndicate between 1995 and 1999, and as the literary and political critic for the daily newspaper Cumhuriyet from 1995.

His poems have been published in several foreign languages. In 2003, he was awarded "The Great Prize of Poetry 2003" by Turkish International P.E.N.

== Bibliography ==
Poems:

- Bir Ermeni General (1965)
- Bir Gün Mutlaka (1970)
- Yolculuk Özlem Cesaret ve Kavga Şiirleri (1974)
- Ne Yağmur... Ne Şiirler... (1976)
- Kuşatmada (1978)
- Mustafa Suphi Destanı (1979)
- Dörtlükler (1983)
- İyi Bir Yurttaş Aranıyor (1983) (played by Ankara Sanat Tiyatrosu)
- Türkiye Üzgün Yurdum, Güzel Yurdum (1985)
- Kızıma Mektuplar (1985)
- Şiirler 1959-1982 (1983)
- Eski Nisan (1987)
- Bebeklerin Ulusu Yok (1988)
- Bir Gün Mutlaka-Toplu Şiirler I(1991)
- Yaşadıklarımdan Öğrendiğim Bir Şey Var-Toplu Şiirler II (1991)
- Kızıma Mektuplar- Toplu Şiirler III (1992)
- Sevgilimsin (1993)
- Aşk İki Kişiliktir (1999)
- Yeni Aşka Gazel (2002)
- İki Ağıt (2007)
- Beyaz İpek Gibi Yağdı Kar (2008)
- Okyanusla İlk Karşılaşma (2008)
- Hayata Uzun Veda (2008)
- Beyaz İpek Gibi Yağdı Kar (2008)
- I've Learned Some Things (translated into English by Walter Andrews, 2008). ISBN 978-0-292-71969-9

Essays:

- Yaşayan Bir Şiir (1986), eklerle yeni basım 2007
- Şiirin Dili-Anadil (1995), reprint 2007
- Utanıyorum (1996)
- Mekanik Gözyaşları (1997)
- Nazım’a Bir Güz Çelengi (1997), reprint: Nazım Hikmet-Tabu ve Efsane(2008)
- İki Ateş Arasında (1998)
- Kimliğim İnsan (1999)
- Başka Bir Açı (2000)
- Gerçeklik Duygusunun Kaybolması (2001)
- Rus Edebiyatı Yazıları (2001)
- Rus Edebiyatında Puşkin Gerçekçiliği (2001)
- Kendin Olmak ya da Olmamak (2003)
- Yeni Ortaçağın Saldırısı (2004)
- Biriciktir Aşk (2005)
- Rus Edebiyatının Öğrettiği (2008)
- Sivil Darbe (2009)
- Benim Prens Adalarım (2010)

Memoirs:

- Aziz Nesinli Anılar (2008)

Travel Memoirs:

- Başka Gökler Altında (1996), reprint 2010
- Yurdu Teninde Duymak (2008)

Play:

- Lozan (1993)

Letters & correspondence:

- Genç Bir Şairden Genç Bir Şaire Mektuplar (İ. Özel'le mektupları,1995)
- Şiirin Kanadında Mektuplar (M. Demirtaş'la mektupları, 1997)

Children books:

- Yiğitler Yiğiti ve Uçan At Masalı (poem-tale)
- Dünya Halk Masalları (translation-adoption)
- Düşler Kuruyorum (book chapter)
- M. Zoşçenko-Lastik Papuçlar (translation)

Anthologies:

- Büyük Türk Şiiri Antolojisi (2 volumes, 1987, eklerle yeni basım)
- Dünya Şiiri Antolojisi (4 volumes, 1997 Ataol Behramoğlu-Özdemir İnce)
- Çağdaş Bulgar Şiiri Antolojisi (1983, Özdemir İnce-Ataol Behramoğlu, reprint 2008)
- Çağdaş Rus Şiiri Antolojisi (reprint, 2008)
- Uçur Diye, Ey Aşk (thematic love poems, 2007)

Translations:

- Anton Çehov-Büyük Oyunlar (Ivanov-Orman Cini-Vanya Dayı-Martı-Üç Kızkardeş-Vişne Bahçesi)
- Aleksandr Puşkin-Bütün Öyküler, Bütün Romanlar
- Aleksandr Puşkin-Seviyordum Sizi (poems)
- Maksim Gorki-Yaşanmış Hikâyeler
- Ivan Turgenev-Arefe
- Mihail Lermontov-Hançer (poems)
- Jose Marti-Göklerde Eriyip Gitmek İsterdim (poems)
- E. Babayev-Nâzım Hikmet
- V. Tulyakova-Nâzımla Son Söyleşimiz
- A. Fevralski-Nâzım'dan Anılar
- S. Viladimirov, D. Moldvaski-Mayakovski
- A. M. Şamsuddinov-Türkiye Ulusal Kurtuluş Savaşı Tarihi
- Fyodor Dostoyevski-Puşkin Üzerine Söylev
