= Sabahattin Kudret Aksal =

Turkish poet, playwright and short-story writer (1920–1993)

- Sculpture of Sabahattin Kudret Aksal
- Born: 25 April 1920; Istanbul, Ottoman Empire
- Died: 19 April 1993 (aged 72); Istanbul, Turkey
- Education: Istanbul University, philosophy
- Occupations: Poet, short-story writer, playwright, essayist, teacher
- Writing career
- Language: Turkish
- Notable works: Gazoz Ağacı; Yaralı Hayvan; Kahvede Şenlik Var; Şiirler

Sabahattin Kudret Aksal (25 April 1920 (Note: TEİS and a 2025 academic study give 25 March 1920. The Ministry of Culture and publisher Ve Yayınevi give 25 April, which is used here.) – 19 April 1993) was a Turkish poet, short-story writer, playwright and essayist. He also worked as a teacher and arts administrator. His early poetry was associated with the literary experimentation of the 1940s, while his later work increasingly addressed time, existence, loneliness and death. In fiction and drama he frequently examined family relationships and the inner lives of ordinary urban characters.

== Education and employment ==
Aksal was born in Istanbul. He attended Işık High School and initially enrolled in law at Istanbul University before transferring to philosophy. He graduated from the Faculty of Letters in 1943 and taught philosophy at several Istanbul schools until 1948.

His subsequent career combined public administration with literary and theatrical work. He served as a labour inspector and an inspector for Istanbul Municipality, became director of the Municipal Conservatory in 1959 and managed the Municipal Theatres in 1961. He later taught aesthetics and psychology at the conservatory and retired from municipal employment in the late 1970s. In 1980–81 he lectured on aesthetics at the State Academy of Fine Arts. He died in Istanbul on 19 April 1993 and was buried at Karacaahmet Cemetery.

== Literary career ==
Aksal's first poem appeared in Varlık in 1938, and his early fiction followed in 1940. His first play, Evin Üstündeki Bulut, was staged in 1948. He published widely in literary magazines and also translated poetry by Charles Baudelaire and Paul Éluard.

His earliest poems were influenced by the Garip movement and often conveyed everyday pleasures and individual hopes. After about 1960, his poetry became more philosophical and, at times, mystical. Time, humanity's place in the universe and the approach of death became recurring subjects. He continued to pay close attention to metre, rhyme, line construction and the formal concentration of short poems.

Aksal concentrated on short-story writing particularly during the 1950s. Gazoz Ağacı and Yaralı Hayvan draw on Istanbul settings, family life and characters alert to their own disappointments. His plays similarly move between domestic conflict and broader philosophical questions. Kahvede Şenlik Var, one of his best-known works, treats a courtship and marriage negotiation as both social comedy and an examination of material values.

== Awards ==
In 1955 Aksal shared the inaugural Sait Faik Short Story Award with Haldun Taner: Aksal was recognised for Gazoz Ağacı and Taner for On İkiye Bir Var. He received the Turkish Language Association Art Award for Yaralı Hayvan in 1957, the Ankara Art Lovers Association award for Kahvede Şenlik Var for 1965–66, the Yeditepe Poetry Prize in 1980 and the Sedat Simavi Literature Award for Buluşma in 1990.

YKY and TEİS also record Avni Dilligil theatre awards in 1980 and 1987 and the ENKA Story Award for "Vav'lar" in 1985. (Note: The Ministry of Culture biography gives 1981 for an Avni Dilligil award and 1990 for the ENKA award. YKY, TEİS and Ve Yayınevi give 1980/1987 and 1985 respectively, the chronology followed here.)

== Selected works ==
=== Poetry ===
- Şarkılı Kahve (1944)
- Gün Işığı (1953)
- Duru Gök (1958)
- Eşik (1970)
- Şiirler (1979)
- Zamanlar (1982)
- Buluşma (1990)
- Batık Kent (1993)

=== Short stories ===
- Gazoz Ağacı (1954)
- Yaralı Hayvan (1956)

=== Plays ===
- Evin Üstündeki Bulut (staged 1948)
- Şakacı (1952)
- Tersine Dönen Şemsiye (1958)
- Kahvede Şenlik Var (1966)
- Kral Üşümesi (1970)
- Bay Hiç – Sonsuzluk Kitabevi (1981)
- Önemli Adam (1983)

=== Essays ===
- Geçmişle Gelecek (1978)

== Style and critical standing ==
Aksal's poetry moved from the pleasures of everyday life towards questions of time and human existence. Critics have also remarked on his attention to language and the psychological lives of his characters. His plays drew on traditional forms as well as the theatre of the absurd.
