= Nigâr Hanım =

Ottoman poet

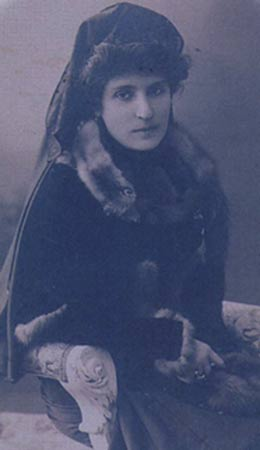
- Born: 1856; Istanbul, Ottoman Empire
- Died: 1 April 1918 (aged 61–62); Istanbul, Ottoman Empire
- Occupation: Poet
- Relatives: Macar Osman Pasha (father)
- Writing career
- Genre: Divan poetry
- Subject: Women's rights

Nigâr Hanım (1856 – 1 April 1918) (Ottoman Turkish: نگار خانم), also known as Nigar Bint-i Osman, was an Ottoman poet, who pioneered modern Western styles in a feminine mode. She is a major figure in post-Tanzimat Turkish poetry.

== Biography ==
Nigâr was born in Istanbul to Macar Osman Pasha (a.k.a. Adolf Farkas), an Ottoman nobleman of Hungarian origin. She was educated at the Kadıköy Fransız Mektebi (French School in Kadıköy), later receiving lectures at home from private teachers. She was able to speak eight different languages and play piano at a young age.

She was married at age fourteen, but divorced after a few years of great unhappiness. By this marriage she had a son, Feridun Bey, who became a French teacher at Robert College and a tutor of Şehzade Ahmed Nihad, a grandson of Sultan Murad V.

Her early poetry is in the traditional divan style, but later she was influenced by Recaizade Mahmut Ekrem and others, and adopted a more modernist stance, influenced by the Western poetry of her time. She was well versed in the cultures of East and West, and knew French, Greek, Arabic, and German.

Her book Efsus was the first poetry book written in Western style of poetry by a woman author. Her writing style, choice of themes and presentation reflects a very feminine sensibility. Apart from poetry, she wrote prose and made several translations.

In her personal life, she was an important and well-known figure in the society of her time. Apart from her career as a poet, her life-style, outgoing personality and choice of clothing had a wide influence on society and the perspective of women at the time.

She became increasingly isolated in the last years of her life, and was in great pain. She died 1918 in İstanbul.

== Awards and recognition ==
Her humanitarian work was recognised by the award of the Order of Charity (Şefkat Nişanı).

In 1998, when Şairler Sofası Park was inaugurated, she was featured in a sculpture by Gürdal Duyar along with 6 other famous poets. At the same time Namık Denizhan made a sculpture of her individually which is in the same park.

== Selected works ==
=== Poetry ===
- Efsus I
- Efsus II
- Nîrân
- Aks-i Sada
- Safahat-ı Kalb
- Elhan-ı Vatan

=== Play ===
- Tesir-i Aşk

=== Memoir ===
- Hayatımın Hikâyesi (1959)
