= Garip (surname) =

Garip is a surname. Notable people with the surname include:

- Emilia Nilsson Garip (born 2003), Swedish diver
- Tamer Garip (born 1962), Cypriot filmmaker
