= Özdemir Asaf =

Turkish writer (1923–1981)

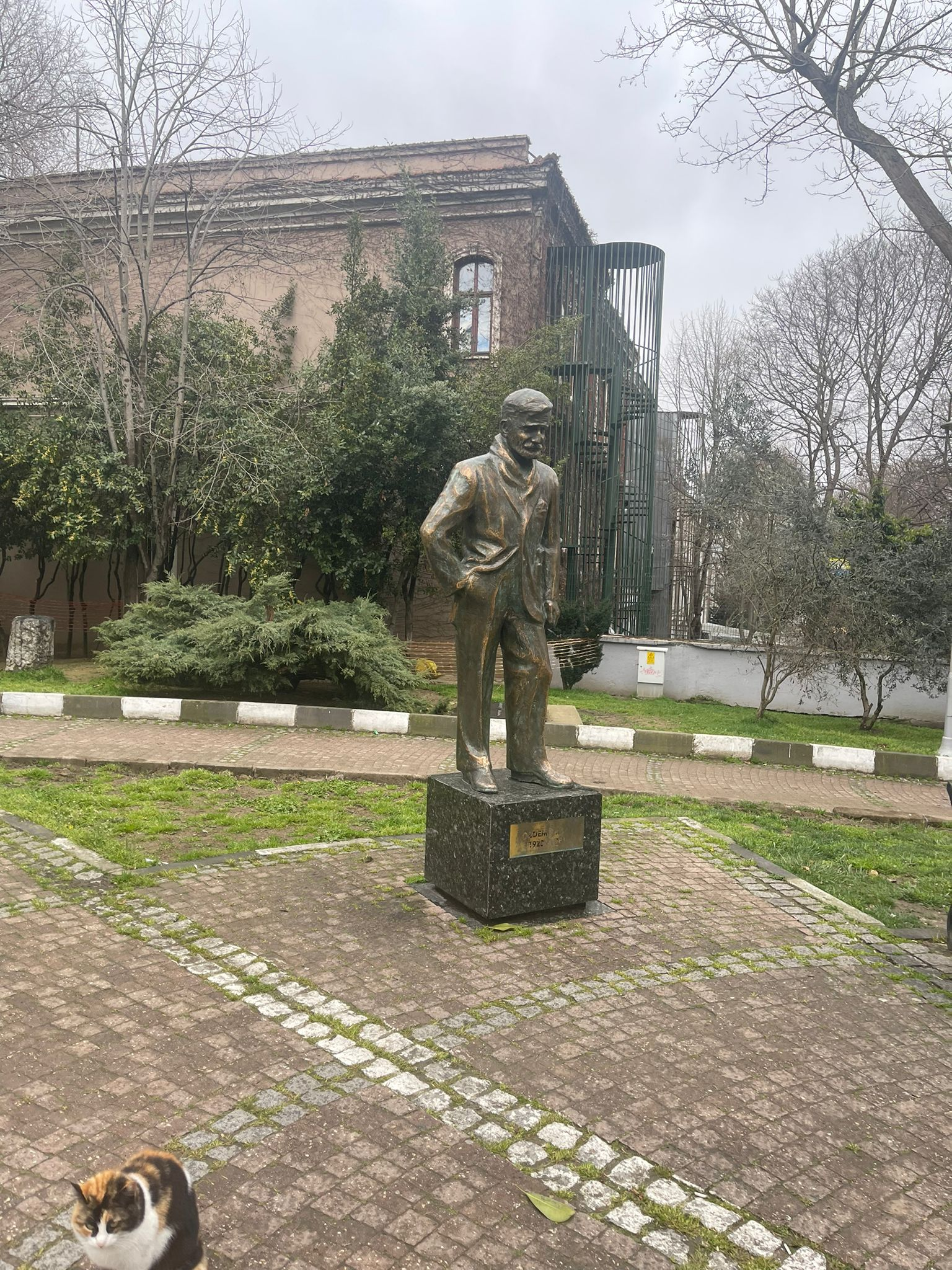
- Statue of Asaf by Namık Denizhan in the Şairler Sofası Park
- Born: Halit Özdemir Arun; June 11, 1923; Ankara, Turkey
- Died: January 28, 1981 (aged 57); Istanbul
- Education: Galatasaray High School; Kabataş High School; Istanbul University
- Occupations: Writer, poet
- Spouses: Sabahat Selma Tezakın; Yıldız Moran (e. 1962–1981)
- Children: Seda Arun; Gün Arun; Olgun Arun; Etkin Arun
- Relatives: Mehmet Asaf (father)
- Writing career
- Language: Turkish

Özdemir Asaf (11 June 1923, Ankara – 28 January 1981, Istanbul) was one of the prominent Turkish poets during the early Republican period.

== Biography ==
=== Life ===
He was born on 11 June 1923 in Ankara. His real name is Halit Özdemir Arun. His father, Mehmet Asaf, is one of the founders of the Council of State. In 1930, the year his father died, he entered the first part of Galatasaray High School. In 1941, in the 11th grade, he went to Kabataş High School for Boys with an additional exam and graduated in 1942. He attended the Faculty of Law, the Faculty of Economics (until the 3rd grade), and the Faculty of Journalism for one year. Meanwhile, he worked for Tanin and Zaman newspapers and made translations.

=== Career ===
His first article published in Servet-i Fünun (Uyanış) magazine. He is founder of Sanat Basımevi (1951) and published his books under the name of Yuvarlak Masa Yayınları. He became one of the founders of the Temel Hakları Yaşatma Derneği (Fundamental Rights Survival Association), which was founded in 1962 under the leadership of Mehmet Ali Aybar.

Together with Attila İlhan, he was the most loved poet of the literary matinees, which was the favorite activity of the 1950s. Özdemir Asaf, who visited the coastal cities of the Atlantic and the east of America in 1954, traveled almost all of Europe, starting from Lapland in 1959. In 1966, at the invitation of the Macedonian Writer's Union, he went to Yugoslavia and participated in the poetry congress.

== Bibliography ==
=== Poems ===
- Dünya Kaçtı Gözüme – 1955
- Sen Sen Sen – 1956
- Bir Kapı Önünde – 1957
- Yumuşaklıklar Değil – 1962
- Nasılsın – 1970
- Çiçekleri Yemeyin – 1975
- Ben Değildim – 1978
- Bugün ve Bugün (Yayımlanmamış şiirler) – 1984
- Benden Sonra Mutluluk (Yayımlanmamış şiirler)
- Çiçek Senfonisi (Toplu şiirler) – 2008
- Sen Bana Bakma, Ben Senin Baktığın Yönde Olurum – 2012
- Yalnızlığa Övgü (Yalnızlık Paylaşılmaz)
- Lavinia

=== Ethica ===
- Yuvarlağın Köşeleri – 1961
- Yuvarlağın Köşeleri-2 – 1988

=== Story ===
- Dün Yağmur Yağacak – 1987

=== Essay ===
- Özdemir Asaf'ça – 1988

=== Translations ===
- Reading Zindanı Baladı (Oscar Wilde) – 1968
- Seçme Şiirler
