= Behçet Necatigil =

Turkish translator (1916-1979)

- Born: 16 April 1916; Istanbul, Ottoman Empire
- Died: 13 December 1979 (aged 63); Istanbul, Turkey
- Occupations: Author, poet, translator

Behçet Necatigil (Mehmet Behçet Gönül) (16 April 1916 – 13 December 1979), Turkish poet, teacher and translator who is often considered to be one of the most important poets of modern Turkish poetry. His paternal family originated from Kastamonu, a city in Turkey's Western Black Sea region. His father, Mehmet Necati Gönül, was from the Çörekçiler family of Kastamonu. The family moved to Kastamonu when Behçet was young, and he completed his primary education there. His interest in literature is noted to have begun during his middle school years in Kastamonu. He later returned to Istanbul to continue his education and career. Throughout his writing life he stood apart from all literary movements, and was known as an independent poet and intellectual. Besides poetry, he has produced works in many fields of literature, such as theater, mythology, lexicography, novel translations and radio plays. He contributed greatly to the adoption of radiophonic play as a branch of literature in Turkey with his plays, translations and adaptations. The artist, who is known as the "Poet of Houses", is also known for his identity as a teacher as well as his literary work.

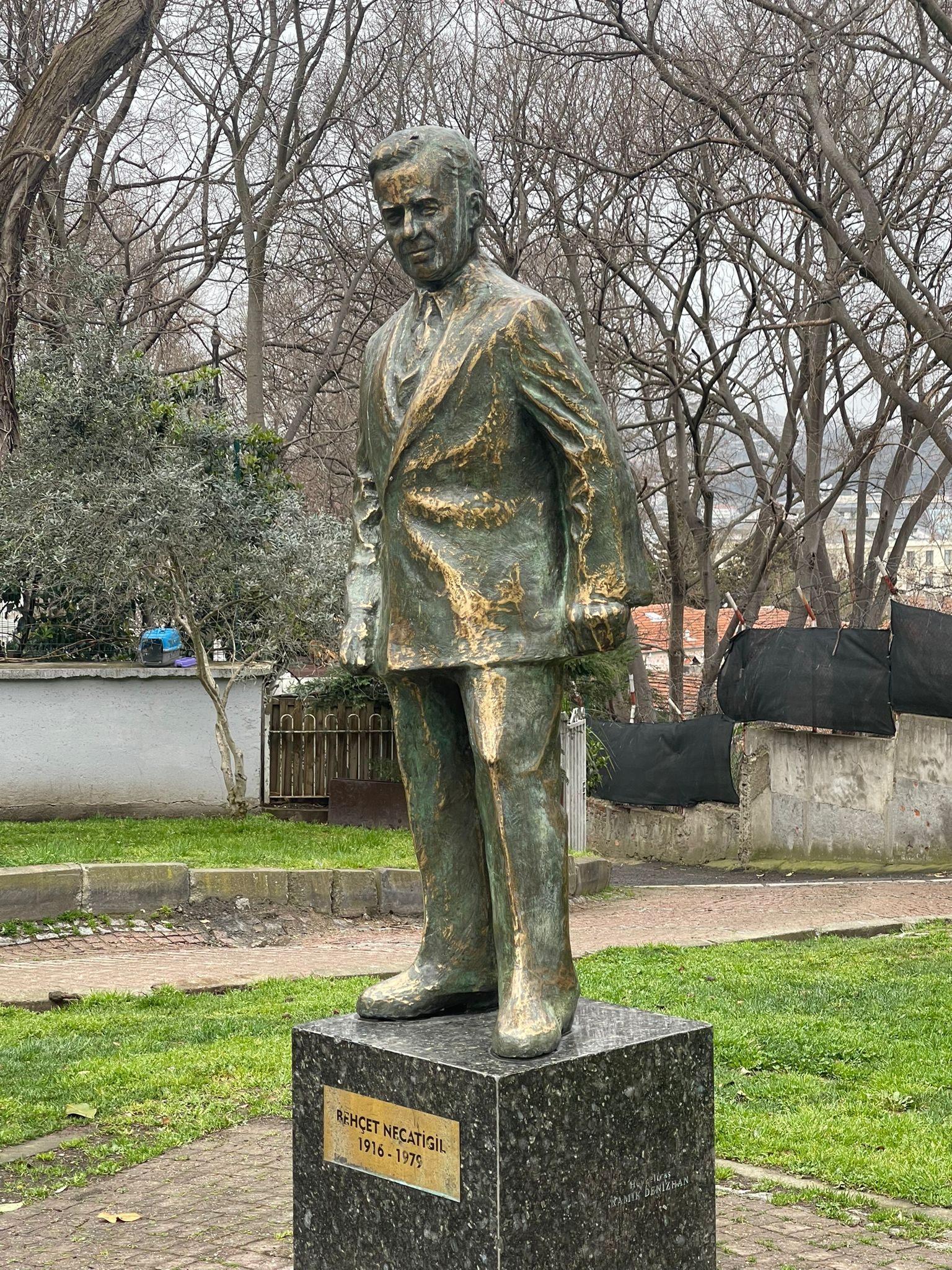
Behçet Necatigil sculpture by Namık Denizhan in Şairler Sofası Park

== Biography ==
Behçet was born in Istanbul, Ottoman Empire, in 1916. He graduated from the Istanbul Higher Teacher Training School (Turkish: İstanbul Yüksek Öğretmen Okulu) in 1940, and served as a teacher of literature at Kabatas Erkek Lisesi until the year 1972. His first poem was published in Varlık journal during his high school years in 1935. From then on, he continued to write poetry for over 40 years. Behçet is also well known for his radio dramas.

He was among the contributors of the literary magazine Papirüs which was edited by Cemal Süreya.

In the Şairler Sofası park in Vişnezade Istanbul there are two sculptures of him that were erected with the parks inauguration in 1998. These are an individual sculpture of him by sculptor Namık Denizhan, and the main sculpture of the park Şairler Sofası by sculptor Gürdal Duyar, in which he is featured alongside 7 other poets.

== Necatigil Poetry Award ==
To commemorate his life, an annual poetry award was instituted in 1980. It was given on the date of Necatigil's death (13 December) until 1993 but is now given at the date of his birth, which is 16 April.

== Bibliography ==
Poetry

- "Kapalıçarşı" (1945)
- "Çevre" (1951)
- "Evler" (1953)
- "Eski Toprak" (1956)
- "Arada" (1958)
- "Dar Çağ" (1960)
- "Yaz Dönemi" (1963)
- "Divançe" (1965)
- "İki Başına Yürümek" (1968)
- "En/Cam" (1970)
- "Zebra" (1973)
- "Kareler Aklar" (1975)
- "Beyler" (1978)
- "Söyleriz" (1980)

== Sample Poem ==
IN LOVE

Love, you put off till tomorrow

Timid, reverent, tongue-tied.

Unknown you remained

To all your kin.

Through concerns never ending,

(I know you never wanted it that way)

The feelings that welled in your heart

Never swelled

When a glance was enough to reveal everything.

You expected longer days to come

Speaking of love in minutes was ugly to you

That the years would pass in such a hurry,

In such a fuss never crossed your mind.

In your secret garden

There were flowers

blossoming at night, alone.

You regarded too trifling to give

Or somehow, you hadn’t enough time.

== See also ==
- List of contemporary Turkish poets
