= Tamer Garip =

Tamer Garip is a Cypriot director and filmwriter. He has written and directed 2 feature films, Code Name Venus [2012] and Dr. Dilara [2016], which premiered at Cannes Film Festival at the Marché du Film (a trade show).

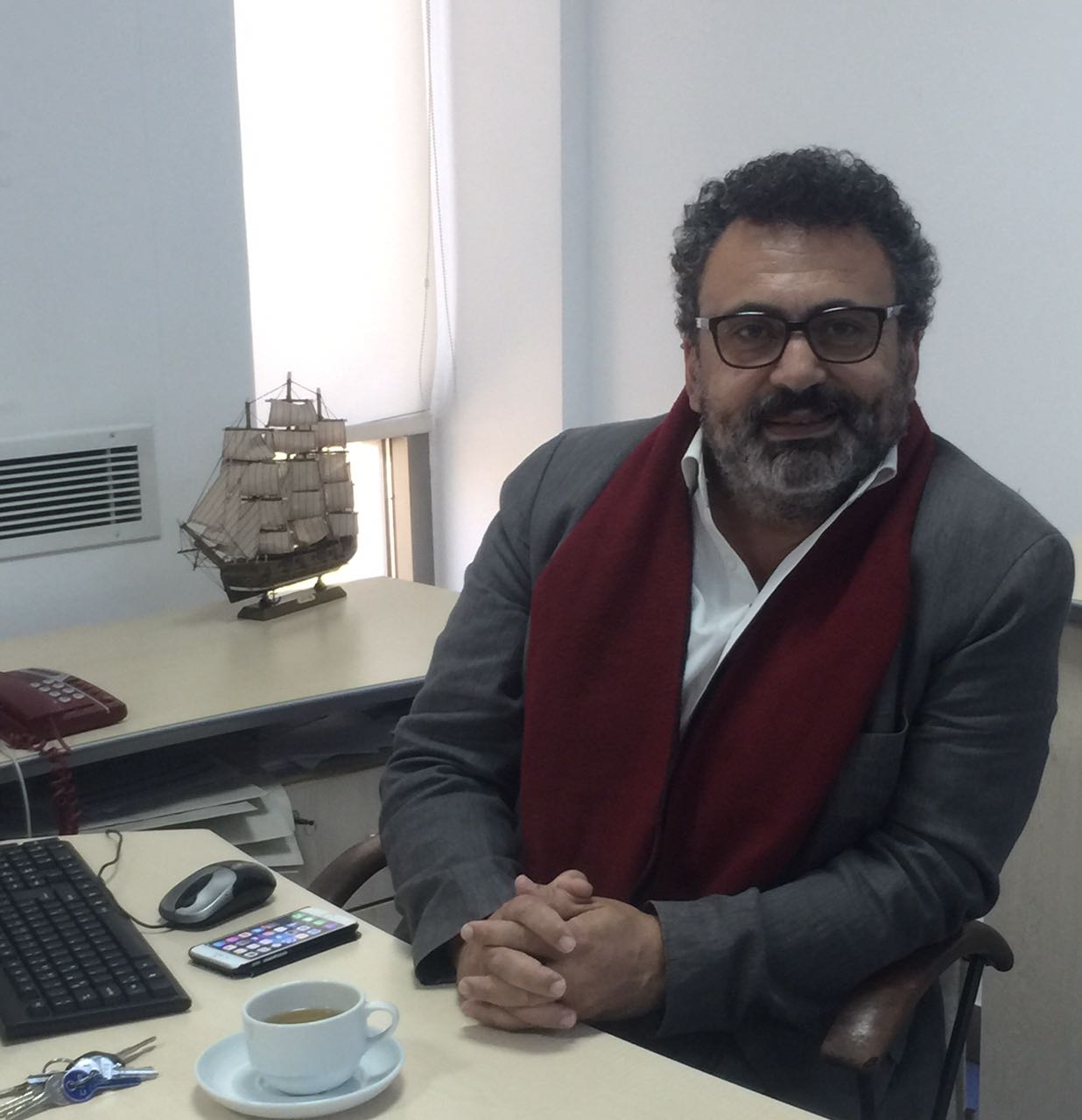
Tamer Garip

== Biography ==
Tamer graduated from Brighton University with a degree in Business Studies, and he studied Directing at Panico Film School in London UK (later merged with London Film Academy).

He was a Pioneer of Interactive Advertising while working on TV ads for Saatchi & Saatchi, BMP, TBWA on accounts such as Levis 501, Nissan, BA and many other blue chip companies in Soho, London during 1988-1992 .

In 1996, he won the best CD-ROM producer award and produced Future Vision Exhibition at Manchester for Barclays Bank Plc, as well as the first e-commerce internet banking for (Transpay) Barclays Bank Plc.

In 1999, he won the Most Innovative Technology Award for ‘Mywapworld’ and The 2nd Best Design Agency Award by Yell Awards of UK.

In 2001, he was elected as one of the most influential people in the internet industry and selected as one of the top 12 internet designers of UK by The Internet Magazine.

With the assistance of BBC and Sky TV, he set up the School of Creative Technologies in London and taught film making techniques to over 100 students in London during 2002–2004.

He was appointed as the CEO of Levent Group of Companies (one of the largest companies in North Cyprus) and Trustee of Cyprus International University from 2006 until 2011. During this time he transformed Levent Group and CIU into one of the fastest growing groups. In 2011 he joined Near East University and became the Head Of Innovation and the Head of Communication. Later he founded the Filmmaking Department and became a lecturer in Directing and produced many documentaries and TV shows.

His film Code Name Venus (Kod Adi Venus) was screened at Cinemas in Turkey, the United Kingdom and North Cyprus in 2013.

Tamer is currently shooting a documentary called ‘What is Art?’ and writing a film script inspired by Anais Nin.
