= Cahit Sıtkı Tarancı =

Turkish poet and author from Türkiye (1910–1956)

- Born: 4 October 1910; Diyarbakır, Ottoman Empire
- Died: 13 October 1956 (aged 46); Vienna, Austria
- Occupations: Novelist, Interpreter
- Spouse: Cavidan Tınaz (m. 1951–1956)
- Writing career
- Movement: Garip

Signature
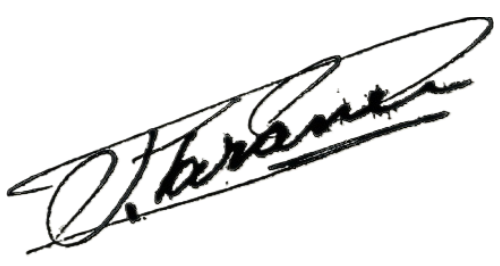

Cahit Sıtkı Tarancı (born Hüseyin Cahit; 4 October 1910 – 13 October 1956) was a Turkish poet. Identified with the poem "Otuz Beş Yaş", Tarancı adhered to the understanding of "art for art's sake". He mostly included the themes of joy of life and death in his poems; He also wrote poems about lost loves, happy loves, loneliness, the bitterness of the bohemian life he lived, and childhood longing. Many of his poems were set to music by different composers. In addition to his poetry books Ömrümde Sükût (1933), Otuz Beş Yaş (1946), Düşten Güzel (1952) and after his death "Sonrası"(1957) and Bütün Şiirleri (1983), he wrote various stories, and these stories were published on the 50th anniversary of Tarancı's death. It was published under the title " Gün Eksilmesin Penceremden" (2006). Most of the letters the poet wrote to his family members, friends and close friends, who also translated poems from French literature, were published under the names of Ziya'ya Mektuplar (1957) and Evime ve Nihal'e Mektuplar (1989).

== Biography ==
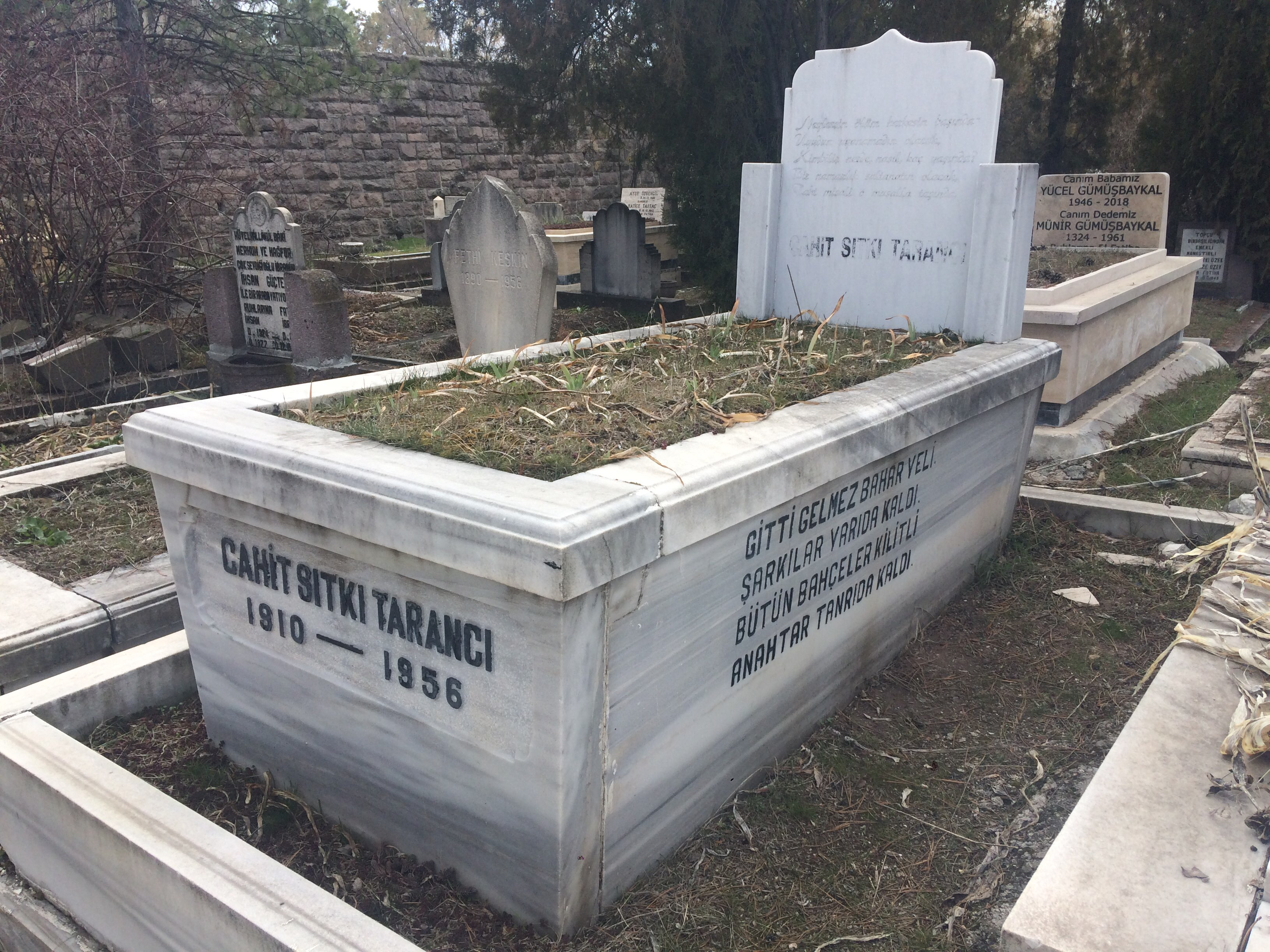
Grave of Cahit Sıtkı Tarancı in Cebeci Asri Cemetery, Ankara

Tarancı belonged to a well known clan family of Diyarbekir (present day: Diyarbakır) like his father Pirinççizâde Bekir Sıdkı and his uncle Pirinççizâde Aziz Feyzi.

Tarancı finished his secondary education in St. Joseph High School, then graduated from Galatasaray High School in Istanbul. After Tarancı finished high school, he continued his education in the School of Political Sciences in Istanbul between the years 1931 and 1935. Then he left for Paris, to study in the Institut d'Études Politiques de Paris, but he had to return to Turkey without completing his education in the wake of World War II in 1940.

From 1944 on, he worked as a translator in the state-owned news agency Anadolu Ajansı, the Turkish Grain Board (TMO) and the Ministry of Labor.

In 1951, he married Cavidan Tınaz. Following a severe illness in 1954, he became paralyzed. As the treatment of his health problem did not succeed in Turkey, he was taken to Vienna, Austria. He died on 13 October 1956 in a hospital there. His body was brought to Turkey and was laid to rest at the Cebeci Asri Cemetery in Ankara.

== Bibliography ==
=== Poetry ===
- Ömrümde Sükut (1933)
- Otuz Beş Yaş (1946)
- Düşten Güzel (1952)
- Sonrası (1957)

=== Prose ===
- Ziya'ya Mektuplar (1957)

== See also ==
- List of contemporary Turkish poets
