= Cahit Külebi =

Turkish poet and author (1917–1997)

Cahit Külebi

Cahit Külebi (20 December 1917, in Tokat – 20 June 1997, in Ankara) was a leading Turkish poet and author. He has an important place in contemporary Turkish poetry due to his attachment to folk poetry traditions. His poetry is enriched with simple yet ironic language, embellished with original descriptions.

== Biography ==
Külebi was born in Çeltek, a village of Zile, Tokat Province, Ottoman Empire in 1917. He completed his elementary school in Niksar and his secondary education in Sivas. His family took the surname Erencan after passing the surname law, and the poet later registered his pseudonym Külebi. Then he went to Istanbul and graduated from the Department of Turkish Language and Literature of The School of Higher Education of Teaching (1940). While he was studying at a teacher's school, he started using the pseudonym Külebi for the first time in these years, as he thought that Principal Fuat Köprülü would be angry with him for writing poems. He studied in the same class with Behçet Necatigil while he was at the teacher training school. Intern Literature teacher at Antalya High School; He taught literature at Ankara State Conservatory and Ankara Gazi High School. Also, Ahmet Hamdi Tanpınar taught at the school. Having finished his education, he worked as a teacher of literature in Antalya and Ankara. In the following years, he became the inspector of National Education. In 1964, he served as a cultural attaché of Turkey in Switzerland. When he returned home, he served as Chief Inspector of the Ministry of National Education and Deputy Undersecretary of Culture. He retired voluntarily in 1973. He was the General Secretary of the Turkish Language Association in the period after 1976. He worked at the Turkish Language Association until 1983. He died in Ankara in 1997.

== Bibliography ==
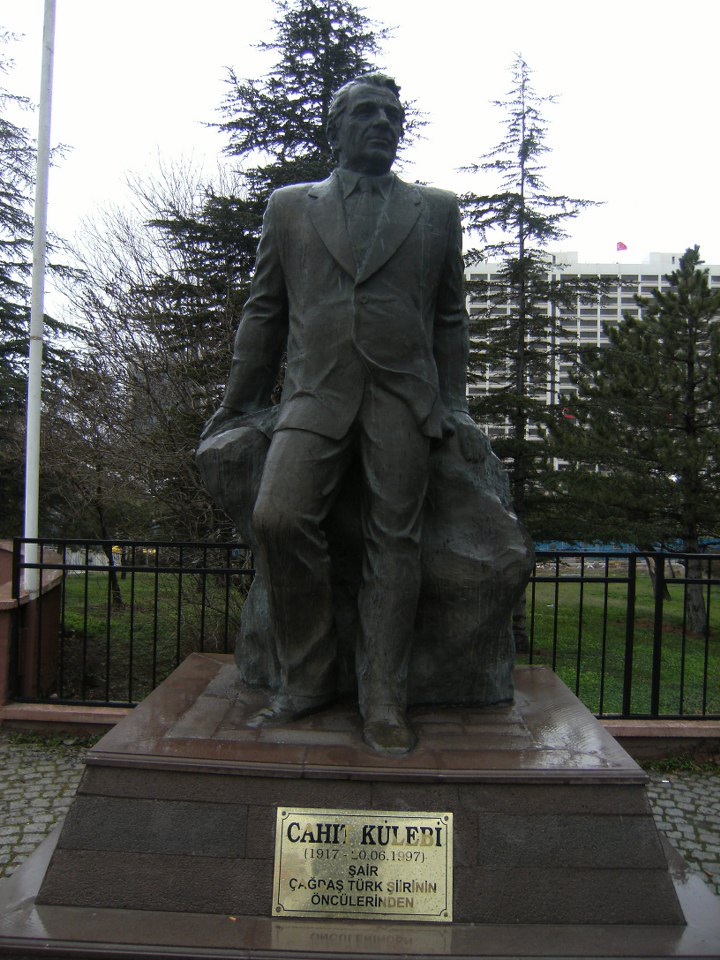
Statue of Cahit Külebi in front of the National Library of Turkey

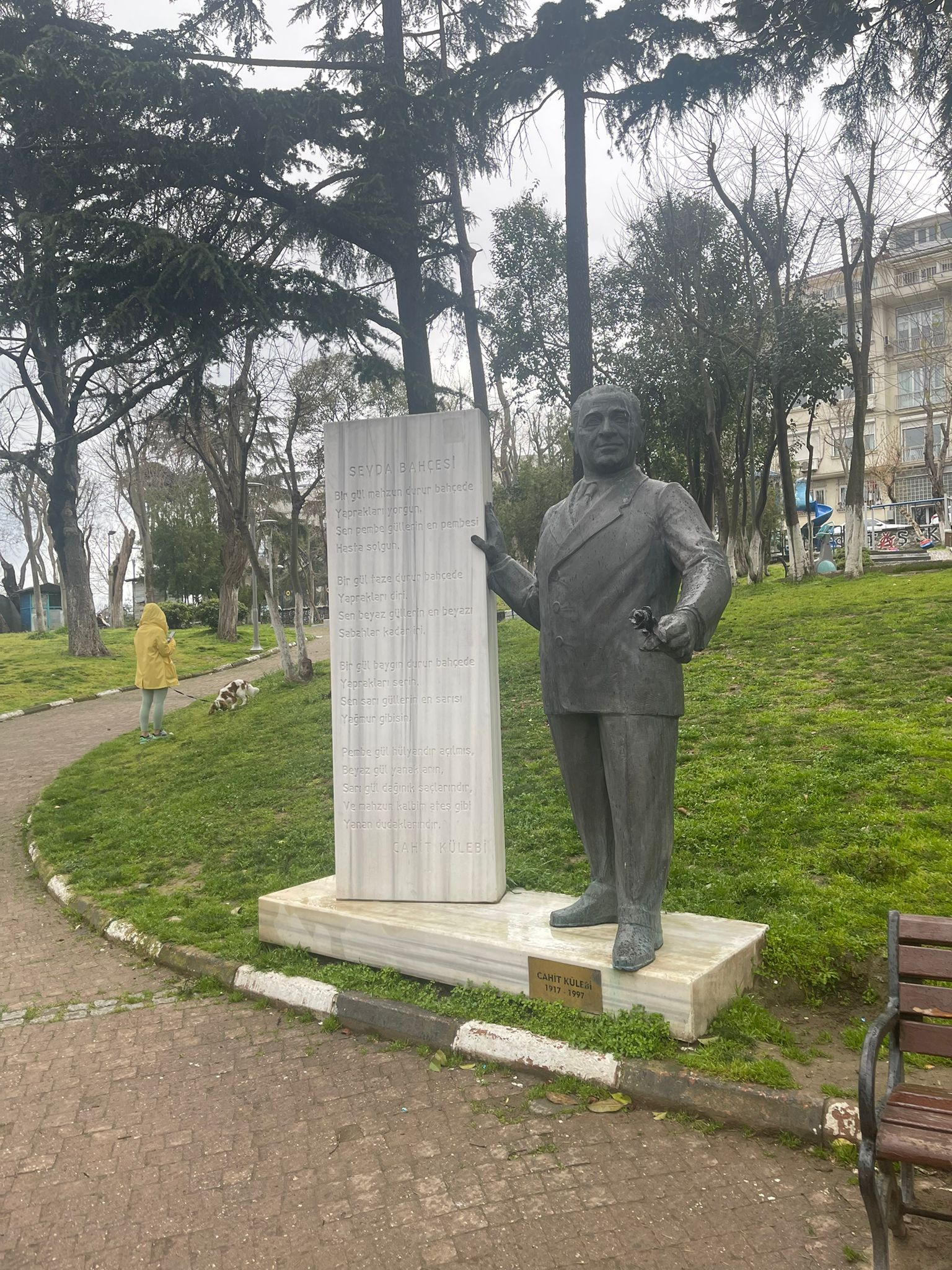
Statue of Cahit Külebi in Şairler Sofası Park

Poetry

- "Adamın Biri" (1946)
- "Rüzgâr" (1949)
- "Atatürk Kurtuluş Savaşında" (1952)
- "Yeşeren Otlar" (1954)
- "Süt" (1965)
- "Şiirler" (1969)
- "Türk Mavisi" (1973)
- "Sıkıntı ve Umut" (1977)
- "Yangın" (1980)
- "Bütün Şiirleri" (1982)
- "Güz Türküleri" (1991)
- "Bütün Şiirleri" (1997)
- "Güzel Yurdum" (1996)
- "Kamyonlar Kavun Taşır"

Memoirs

- "İçi Sevda Dolu Yolculuk" (1986)

Proses

- "Şiir Her Zaman" (1985)

Essays

- "Ecem'in Günlüğü" (1972)
