= Melih Cevdet Anday =

Turkish poet and author (1915–2002)

- Born: 13 March 1915 Istanbul, Turkey
- Died: 28 November 2002 (aged 87) Istanbul, Turkey

Melih Cevdet Anday (13 March 1915 – 28 November 2002) was a Turkish poet and author whose poetry stands outside the traditional literary movements. He also wrote in many other genres which, over six and a half decades, included eleven collections of poems, eight plays, eight novels, fifteen collections of essays, several of which won major literary awards. He also translated several books from diverse languages into Turkish.

== Biography ==
Melih Cevdet Anday was born in Istanbul in 1915 and lived there until his parents moved to Ankara in 1931. He graduated from Gazi High School and for a while began studying sociology in Belgium on a State Railways scholarship but had to return home in 1940 after the German invasion. Between 1942 and 1951, he worked as a publication consultant for the Ministry of Education in Ankara and then as a city librarian. During this time, he began his career as a journalist for several newspapers. After 1954, he worked as a teacher of diction for the Istanbul Municipal Conservatory, from which he retired in 1977. Between 1964 and 1969, Anday served on Turkish Radio Television's board of directors and also acted as a consultant to UNESCO.

== Literary career ==
As a poet, Anday was one of the leaders of the Garip movement, which also included Orhan Veli and Oktay Rifat. According to the preface of their joint collection, published in 1941, poetry should abandon the formalism and rhetorical classical style of previous centuries, making itself simple, colloquial, and matter of fact—an artless art designed to serve the common people.

However, present there even then was an uneasy acknowledgement of French Surrealism, and Anday was eventually to change his engaged style to a cerebral neo-surrealism as he cautiously navigated within and beyond the difficult political waters of his country. This culminated in what was regarded at the time as his masterwork, the four-sectioned long poem "Ulysses Bound" (Turkish: Kolları Bağlı Odysseus) of 1963. In this he deploys an original rhetoric of his own:

A slow world, in progress, with no memory
Visible only to the eye before there was an eye
Where nameless beings were advancing among other beings
Trees grew before trees were
And a star in the temple of the clouds
Opened wide the unharvested sky
To the bloody dawn of the epochs before there was reason.

Other sectioned poems of some length were to follow, including "On the Nomad Sea" (Turkish: Göçebe Denizin Üstünde, 1970) and "A poem in the manner of Karacaoğlan" (Turkish: Karacaoğlan’ın Bir Şiiri Üzerine Çeşitlemeler’de). But there were also many short poems of disarming simplicity such as "Sun" (I was just about to speak/ When suddenly the sun came out) and "Seagull" (Seagull, capital letter/ Scribbled by a child) whose thoughtful qualities journey beyond his earlier manner.

From henceforth his varied work began to earn Anday official recognition. In particular his play Mikado’nun Çöpleri (The Mikado Game) earned him several awards: Most Successful Playwright of the 1967–1968 Drama Season; the İlhan İskender Prize; Ankara Art Lovers Foundation for the Best Playwright in 1971–1972. Another play, Ölümsüzler ya da Bir Cinayetin Söylencesi (The Immortals or the Legend of a Murder) won the Enka Art Prize in 1980. His poetry collection Teknenin Ölümü (Death of the Boat) won the 1978 Sedat Simavi Foundation Literature Prize, and Ölümsüzlük Ardında Gılgamış (Gilgamesh Beyond Death) gained the 1981 Türkiye İş Bankası Prize. In 1971 UNESCO honoured him among other outstanding European authors. He also received the TÜYAP Honour Prize for 1991 and the 2000 Aydın Doğan Foundation Literature Award.

In 1994, the sculptor Metin Yurdanur cast a seated statue of him in bronze which is now sited in the park named after him at Ören on the Gulf of Gökova. Later in 1998, Yurdanur again sculpted him for a monument in the Şairler Sofası Park.

== Bibliography ==
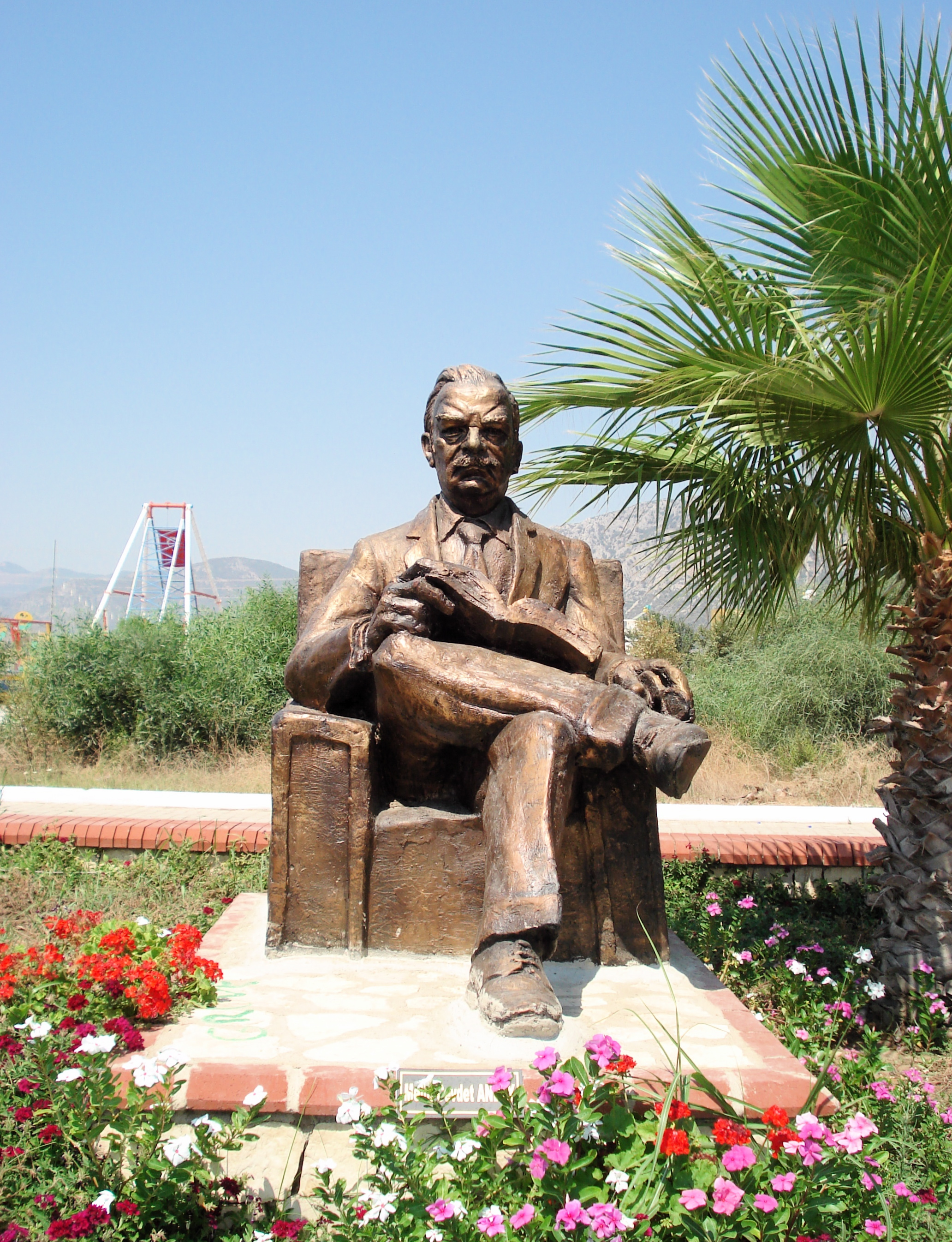
Metin Yurdanur's statue of the poet in Melih Cevdet Anday Park, Ören

Poetry

- Garip (Odd, 1941) with Orhan Veli and Oktay Rifat
- Rahatı Kaçan Ağaç (The Disturbed Tree, 1946)
- Telgrafhane (Telegram Office, 1952)
- Yan Yana (Side by side, 1956)
- Kolları bağlı Odysseus (Odysseus Bound, 1963)
- Göçebe Denizin Üstünde (On the Nomad Sea, 1970)
- Teknenin Ölümü (The death of a Boat, 1975)
- Sözcükler (Words, 1978)
- Ölümsüzlük Ardında Gılgamış (Gilgamesh Beyond Death, 1981)
- Güneşte (In the Sun, 1989)
- Yağmurun Altında (Under the Rain, 1995)
- Seçme Şiirler (Selected Poetry, 1997)

Novels

- Aylaklar (The Vagabonds, 1965)
- Gizli Emir (The Secret Command, 1970)
- İsa'nın Güncesi (The Diary of Christ, 1974)
- Raziye (1975)
- Yağmurlu Sokak (Rainy Street, 1991),
- Meryem Gibi (Like Mary, 1991)
- Birbirimizi Anlayamayız (We Cannot Understand Each Other, 1992)

Plays

- İçerdekiler (Insiders, 1965)
- Mikado'nun Çöpleri (The Mikado Game, 1967)
- Dört Oyun (Four Plays: Tomorrow in a Different Grove, Beware of the Dog, The Dead Want to Speak, and Inspectors,1972)
- Ölümsüzler (The Immortals: Complete Plays 1 and 2, 1981)

Essays

- Doğu-Batı (East-West, 1961)
- Konuşarak (Speaking, 1964)
- Gelişen Komedya (Developing Comedy, 1965)
- Yeni Tanrılar (The New Gods, 1974)
- Sosyalist Bir Dünya (A Socialist World, 1975)
- Dilimiz Üstüne Konuşmalar (Discussions about our Language, 1975)
- Maddecilik ve Ülkücülük (Materialism and Idealism, 1977)
- Yasak (The Ban, 1978)
- Paris Yazıları (Paris Writings, 1982)
- Açıklığa Doğru (Towards Openness, 1984)
- Sevişmenin Güdüklüğü ve Yüceliği (On the Deficiency and Loftiness of Love-Making, 1990)
- Yiten Söz (The Vanishing Word, 1992)
- Aldanma ki (Don't Be Fooled, 1992)
- İmge Ormanları (The Forests of Images, 1994)
- Geleceği Yaşamak (Living the Future, 1994)

Memoir

- Sovyet Rusya, Azerbaycan, Özbekistan, Bulgaristan, Macaristan (Soviet Russia, Azerbaijan, Uzbekistan, Bulgaria, Hungary, 1965)

== Translations into European languages ==
Anday's works have been translated into Russian, German, Hungarian, Romanian, French and English. Book-length translations include the novel Aylaklar into Bulgarian (Sofia 1966) and poetry selections into French: Ulysse Bras Attachés et autres poèmes, (Poésie-Club UNESCO, Paris, 1970) and Offrandes 1946–1989 (Editions UNESCO, 1998). US selections of poetry include On The Nomad Sea, (Geronimo Books, New York, 1974); Rain One Step Away, translated by Talat Sait Halman and Brian Swann, (Charioteer Press, Washington, DC, 1980); Silent Stones: Selected Poems of Melih Cevdet Anday (Northfield: Talisman House, 2017). The last of these, translated by poets Sidney Wade and Efe Murad, was winner of the 2015 Meral Divitçi Prize.

1.M.C.ANDAY. "EI" Magazine of European Art Center (EUARCE) of Greece, 8st issue 1994, p. 11 & 38–39

== See also ==
- Garip Movement
- List of contemporary Turkish poets
