= Orhan Veli Kanık =

Turkish poet (1914–1950)

Orhan Veli
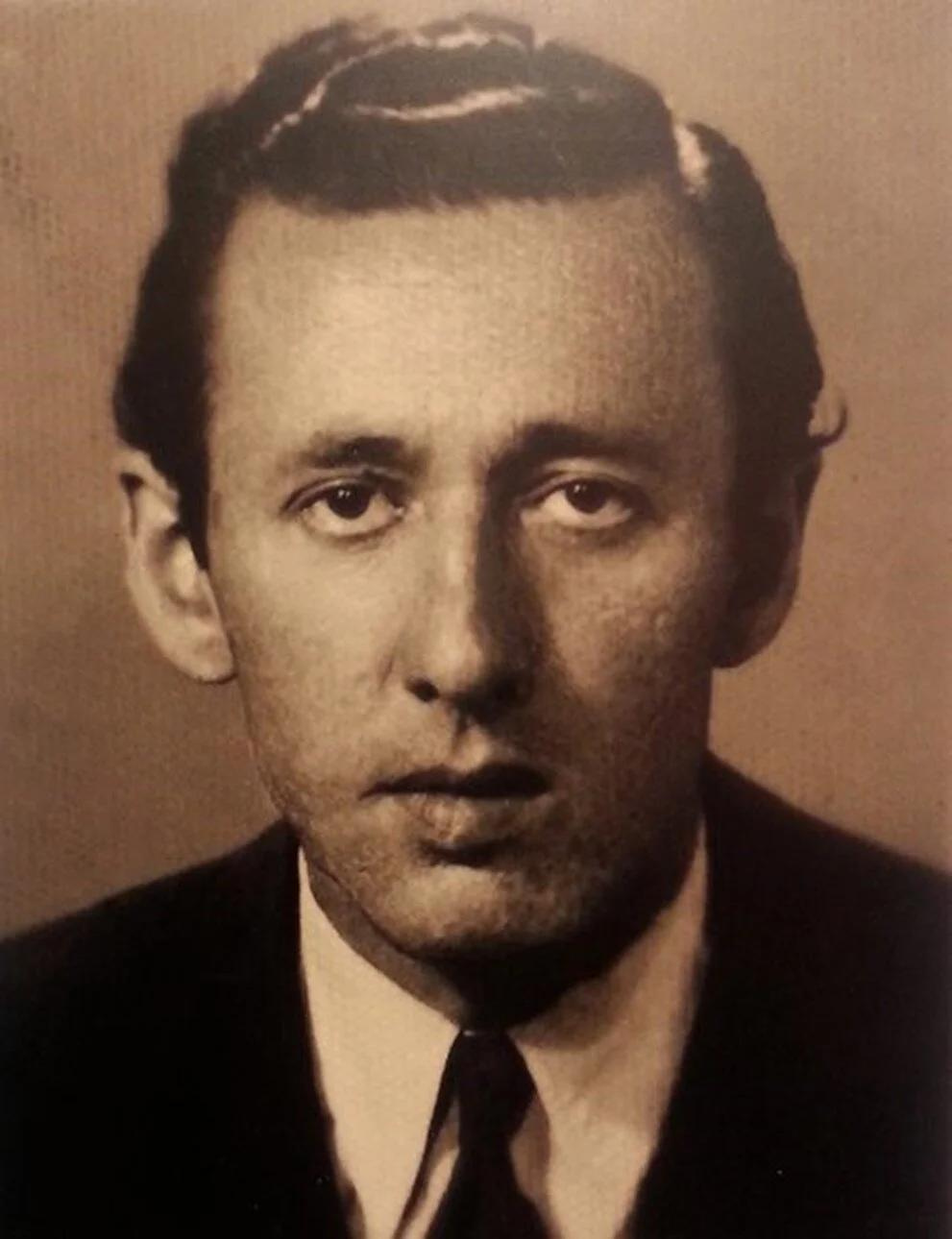
- Born: Orhan Veli Kanık; 13 April 1914; Beykoz, Istanbul, Ottoman Empire
- Died: 14 November 1950 (aged 36); Istanbul, Turkey
- Education: Istanbul University
- Occupation: Poet
- Writing career
- Period: 1936–1950
- Movement: Garip

Signature
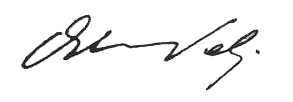

Orhan Veli Kanık or Orhan Veli (13 April 1914 – 14 November 1950) was a Turkish poet. He was one of the founders of the Garip Movement together with Oktay Rıfat and Melih Cevdet.

== Life ==
=== Childhood and education ===
Orhan Veli Kanık was born at number 9 Çayır Alley on the İshak Ağa Climb in Yalıköy Beykoz, on 13 April 1914. His father, Mehmet Veli, was the son of Fehmi Bey, a merchant from İzmir, and his mother was Fatma Nigar, Hacı Ahmet Bey's daughter from Beykoz. Veli spent his childhood years in Beykoz, Beşiktaş and Cihangir.

He graduated from high school in 1932. He was enrolled in the philosophy chair of Istanbul University's Department of Literature. In 1933 he was elected the president of the Department of Literature Students' Association. He dropped out of the university in 1935 without obtaining his degree. He continued with his teacher's assistant position at the Galatasaray High School for another year after dropping out of college.

=== Later life and literary career ===
Kanık moved to Ankara and was hired at Telegraph Department International Orders Bureau of the PTT, the Turkish national mail and telegraph service.

He left PTT in 1942 for his mandatory military service. He served until 1945 in Kavakköy in Gallipoli. He was discharged in 1945 as a lieutenant and started working in the Translations Department of the Ministry of Education.

=== Death ===
After Yaprak was shuttered Kanık moved back to Istanbul. On 10 November 1950 while visiting Ankara he fell down a hole dug in the street by the municipality. He returned to Istanbul two days later. On 14 November he felt sick while having lunch at a friend's house and was admitted to hospital. He was misdiagnosed and treated for alcohol poisoning, slipping into a coma at 20:00 the same evening. He died of a brain aneurysm at 23:30 in Cerrahpaşa Hospital, Istanbul.

For the 38th anniversary of his death a sculpture of him was inaugurated in Aşiyan Asri Cemetery where he is buried. In 1998 two more sculptures were made featuring him, this time in Vişnezade. He is featured in Gürdal Duyars Şairler Sofası which was erected in a park of the same name. The sculpture features him with six other Turkish poets. In the same park Namık Denizhans sculpture of Orhan Veli was also erected.

== Works ==
- Garip (Together with Oktay Rifat and Melih Cevdet, 1941)
- Garip (1945)
- Vazgeçemediğim (1945)
- Destan Gibi (1946)
- Yenisi (1947)
- Karşı (1949)
- Collected Poems (1951, 1975)

== Translations ==
Güneş/Sol, Leonardo da Fonseca (trad.), (n.t.) Revista Literária em Tradução, nº 2 (mar/2011), Fpolis/Brasil, ISSN 2177-5141
