= Vişnezade =

- Neighbourhood
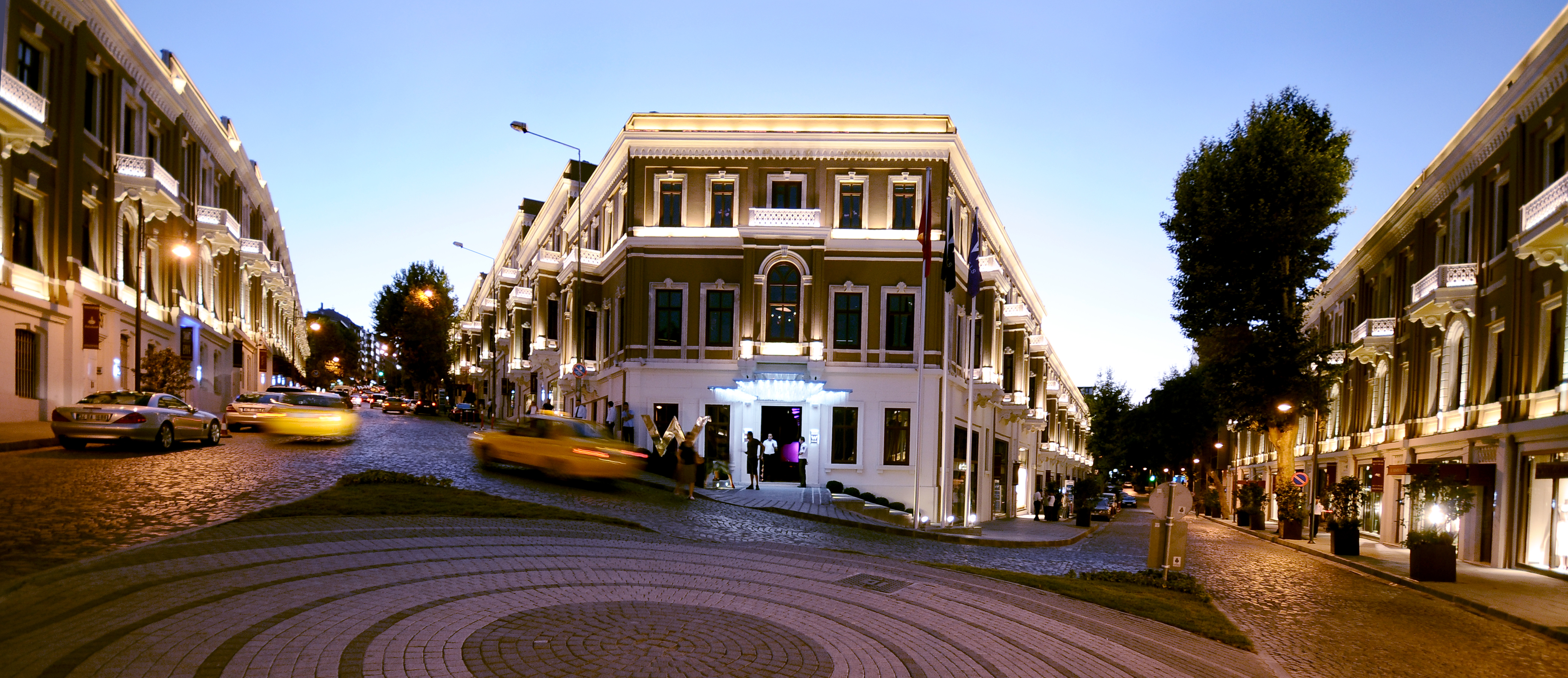

- Location within Turkey Location within Istanbul
- Coordinates: 41°02′32″N 28°59′57″E
- Country: Turkey
- Province: Istanbul
- District: Beşiktaş
- Population (2023): 7,959
- Time zone: UTC+3 (TRT)

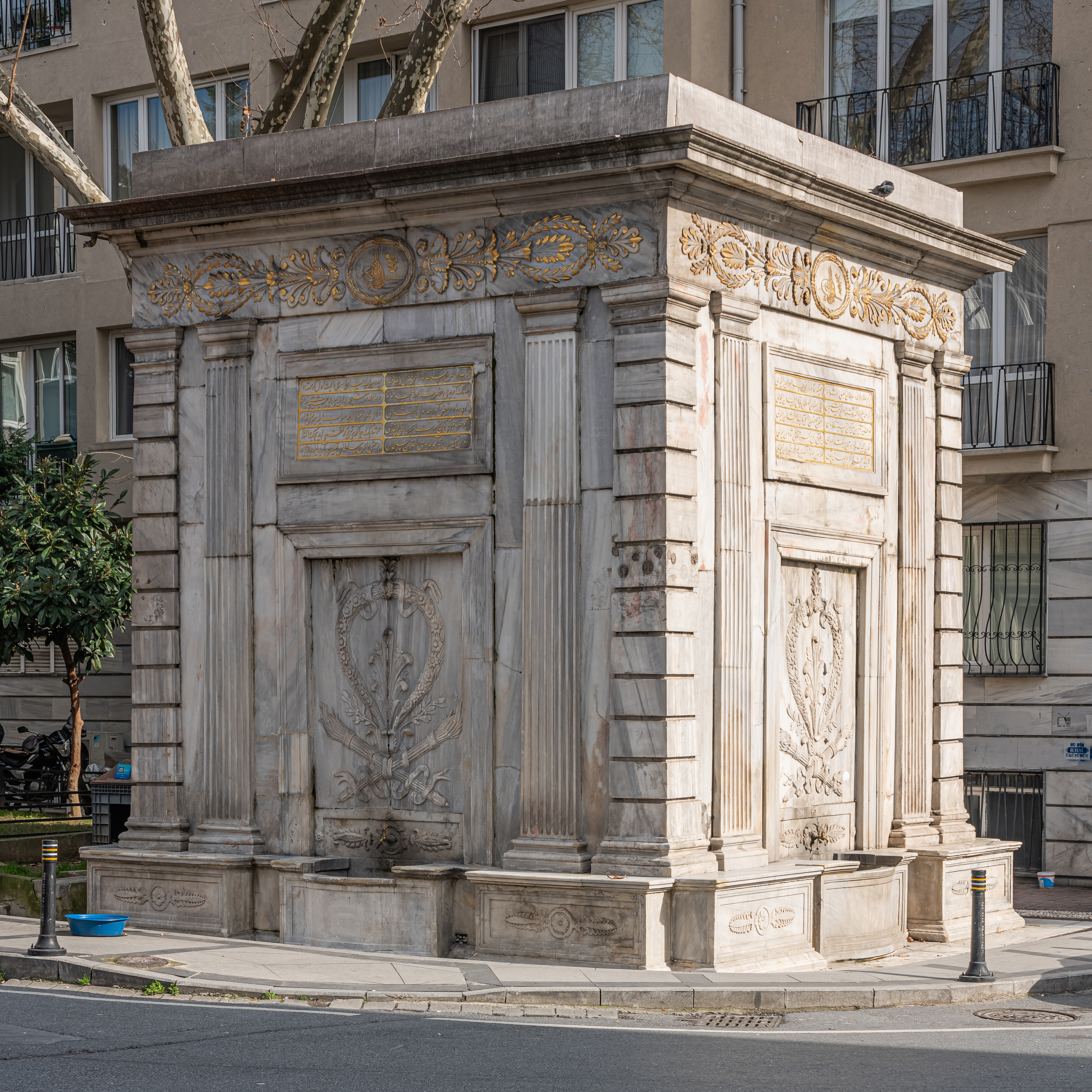
Vişnezade Fountain in Maçka

Vişnezade is a neighborhood in the municipality and district of Beşiktaş, Istanbul Province, Turkey. Its population is 7,959 as of 2023. Vişne translates to "sour cherry" from Turkish and the neighborhood is named after İzzeti Mehmet Efendi (1629-1681), an Ottoman statesman nicknamed Vişnezade who was known to cultivate sour cherry in the place of this neighborhood.

Vişnezade is the southernmost neighborhood of Beşiktaş district. Beyoğlu district is to the southwest, Sinanpaşa (Beşiktaş centrum) is to the north east and the Bosphorus is to the southeast. It includes multiple quarters, such as Akaretler, Dolmabahçe, Maçka, and Valideçeşme.

Vişnezade includes important structures such as Dolmabahçe Palace, the Akaretler rowhouses, Beşiktaş Stadium, Istanbul Technical University Maçka Campus, Maçka Park, and the mosque which bears the name of the neighborhood.
