= Metin Altıok Poetry Award =

Turkish poetry award

- Awarded for: Poetry
- Country: Turkey
- Presented by: Kırmızı Kedi Publishing House
- First award: 2008

The Metin Altıok Poetry Award (Turkish: Metin Altıok Şiir Ödülü) is a Turkish literary award given in the field of poetry by Kırmızı Kedi Publishing House in memory of the poet Metin Altıok, who was killed in the 1993 Sivas massacre.

== Recipients ==
Year	Recipient	Book	Jury	Source
2008	Haydar Ergülen	Üzgün Kediler Gazeli [Ghazal of Sad Cats]	Füsun Akatlı, Gülten Akın, Eray Canberk, Enver Ercan, Talât Sait Halman, Doğan Hızlan and Ülkü Tamer	
2009	Azad Ziya Eren	Ars Requiem and Bırakılma Koridoru [Corridor of Abandonment]	Füsun Akatlı, Gülten Akın, Eray Canberk, Enver Ercan, Talât Sait Halman, Doğan Hızlan and Ülkü Tamer	
2010	Hulki Aktunç	Sönmemiş Dizeler [Unextinguished Lines]	Füsun Akatlı, Gülten Akın, Eray Canberk, Enver Ercan, Talât Sait Halman, Doğan Hızlan and Ülkü Tamer	
2011	Birhan Keskin	Soğuk Kazı [Cold Excavation]	Eray Canberk, Ali Cengizkan, Talât Sait Halman, Doğan Hızlan, Ülkü Tamer, Güven Turan and Hilmi Yavuz	
2012	Tozan Alkan	Sana Şehir Gelecek [A City Will Come to You]	Eray Canberk, Ali Cengizkan, Talât Sait Halman, Doğan Hızlan, Ülkü Tamer, Güven Turan and Hilmi Yavuz	
2013	Cenk Gündoğdu	Issız [Desolate]	Doğan Hızlan, Hilmi Yavuz, Güven Turan, Talât Sait Halman, Ali Cengizkan, Eray Canberk and Ülkü Tamer	
2014	Gülten Akın	Beni Sorarsan [If You Ask About Me]	Doğan Hızlan, Hilmi Yavuz, Güven Turan, Talât Sait Halman, Ali Cengizkan, Haydar Ergülen and Eray Canberk	
2015	Salih Bolat	Atların Uykusu [The Sleep of Horses]	Doğan Hızlan, Hilmi Yavuz, Güven Turan, Ahmet Telli, Ali Cengizkan, Haydar Ergülen and Eray Canberk	
2016	Tuğrul Tanyol	Gelecek Günlerin Şarabı [The Wine of Coming Days]	Doğan Hızlan, Hilmi Yavuz, Ahmet Telli, Haydar Ergülen, Şükrü Erbaş, Ali Cengizkan and Eray Canberk	
2017	Ahmet Hicri İzgören	Aşktan Alır Rengini [It Takes Its Color from Love]	Doğan Hızlan, Hilmi Yavuz, Ahmet Telli, Haydar Ergülen, Şükrü Erbaş, Ali Cengizkan and Eray Canberk	
2018	Cevat Çapan	Son Duraktan Bir Önce [One Stop Before the Last]	Ahmet Telli, Ali Cengizkan, Eray Canberk, Haydar Ergülen and Şükrü Erbaş	
2019	Gökçenur Ç.	Giderken Öpmeseydin Keşke [I Wish You Had Not Kissed Me While Leaving]	Ahmet Telli, Ali Cengizkan, Eray Canberk, Haydar Ergülen, Hilmi Yavuz, Şükrü Erbaş and Doğan Hızlan	
2020	Hıdır Işık	Öpülmemiş Şehlâ [The Unkissed Hazel-Eyed Woman]	Ali Cengizkan, Eray Canberk, Haydar Ergülen, Hilmi Yavuz, Salih Bolat, Şükrü Erbaş and Doğan Hızlan	
2021	Seyyidhan Kömürcü	Kendinin Ağacı [The Tree of the Self]	Ali Cengizkan, Eray Canberk, Haydar Ergülen, Hilmi Yavuz, Salih Bolat, Şükrü Erbaş and Doğan Hızlan	
2022	İlhan Sami Çomak	Hayattayız Nihayet [We Are Alive at Last]	Doğan Hızlan, Hilmi Yavuz, Eray Canberk, Şükrü Erbaş, Ali Cengizkan and Haydar Ergülen	
2023	Selahattin Yolgiden	uyurken de görebiliyorsun geceyi [You Can See the Night Even While Sleeping]	Doğan Hızlan, Hilmi Yavuz, Eray Canberk, Şükrü Erbaş, Ali Cengizkan, Latife Tekin and Haydar Ergülen	
2024	Şeref Bilsel	Kâğıdın Ölümü [The Death of Paper]	Doğan Hızlan, Hilmi Yavuz, Eray Canberk, Şükrü Erbaş, Ali Cengizkan, Latife Tekin and Haydar Ergülen	
2025	Orhan Alkaya	Pâre [Piece]	Doğan Hızlan, Hilmi Yavuz, Eray Canberk, Şükrü Erbaş, Ali Cengizkan, Latife Tekin and Haydar Ergülen	
2026	Elçin Sevgi Suçin	Paralize Zaman Diyalogları [Dialogues in Paralyzed Time]	Doğan Hızlan, Hilmi Yavuz, Eray Canberk, Latife Tekin, Ali Cengizkan, Orhan Alkaya and Haydar Ergülen	
