= Pertevniyal High School =

Public high school in Istanbul, Turkey

- Pertevniyal Lisesi
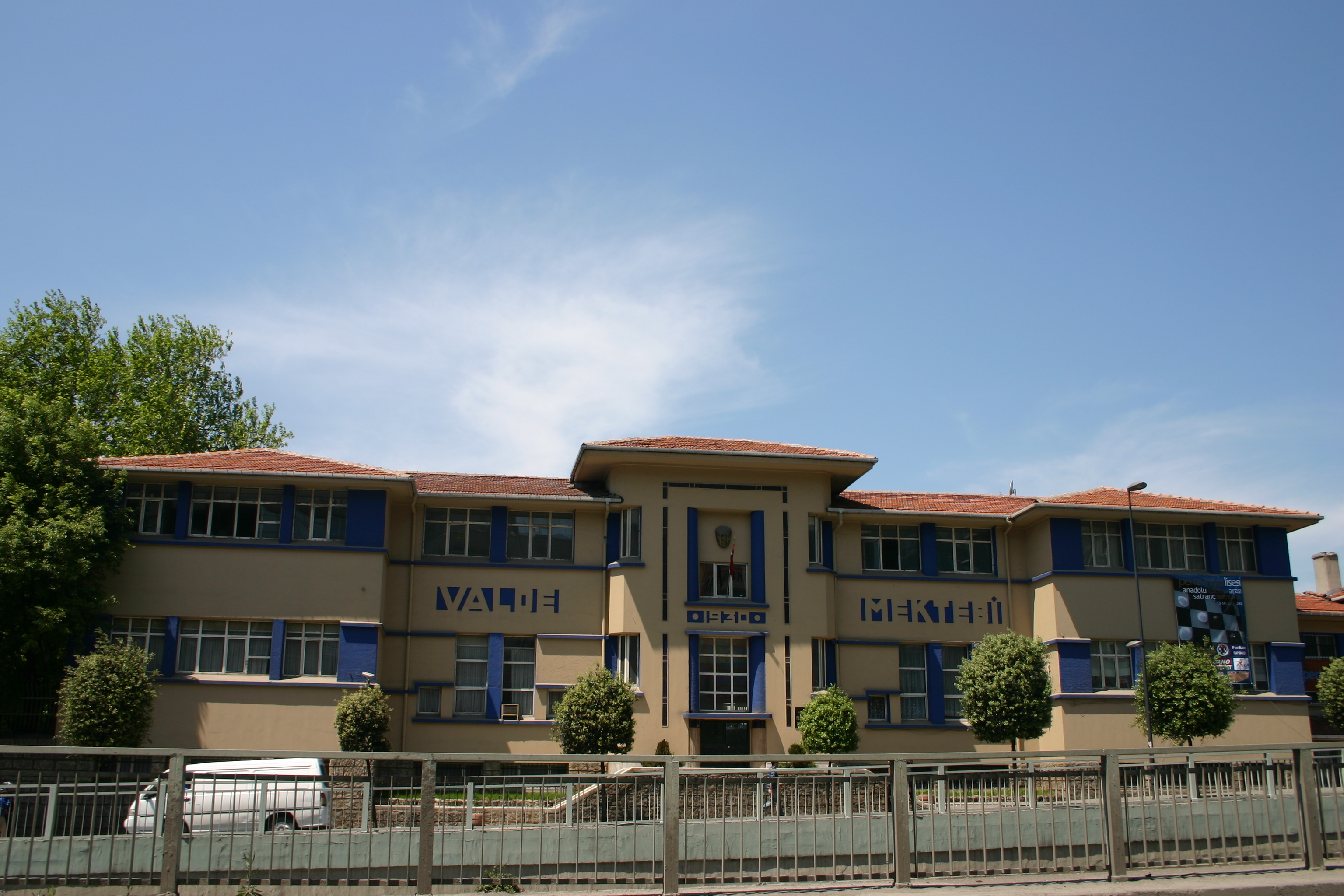
- The school's historic building in Aksaray, Istanbul

Location
- Aksaray, Fatih; Istanbul; Turkey; 41.01081°N 28.95292°E

Information
- Type: Public Anatolian High School
- Established: April 6, 1872; 154 years ago
- Founder: Pertevniyal Sultan
- Gender: Coeducational
- Language: Turkish, English

Pertevniyal High School (Turkish: Pertevniyal Lisesi), historically also known as Valde Mektebi, is a public Anatolian High School in the Aksaray quarter of Fatih, Istanbul, Turkey. Opened on 6 April 1872 as the Mahmudiye Mektebi, it is one of the oldest continuously operating secondary schools in Turkey.

The school was endowed by Pertevniyal Sultan, consort of Sultan Mahmud II and mother of Sultan Abdulaziz, who had it built next to the Pertevniyal Valide Sultan Mosque in her husband's memory. By 1999 it had produced close to 80,000 graduates, among them prominent Turkish writers, artists, journalists and politicians.

== History ==
=== Ottoman era ===
Construction of the school began together with that of the adjacent Pertevniyal Valide Sultan Mosque, after shops on the site were expropriated on the orders of Pertevniyal Sultan, who wished to dedicate a mosque to her own name and a school to that of her late husband, Sultan Mahmud II. The original two-storey, eight-room building cost 3,530 gold coins and took two years to complete. It opened on 6 April 1872 under the name Mahmudiye Mektebi, with a sıbyan (primary) school on the ground floor and a rüşdiye (middle) school upstairs.

The school became popular in part because the endowment's trustee paid each pupil an annual clothing allowance of 120 kuruş. After Pertevniyal Sultan died in 1883, the revenues of her waqf continued to fund the school.

The Mahmudiye Rüştiyesi operated for 39 years until its building was destroyed in the great Aksaray fire of 1911. Teaching then continued, under the same name, in a mansion in the nearby Sinekli Bakkal area.

=== Republican era ===
In 1930, Osman Bey, the trustee of the Pertevniyal Valide Sultan foundation, used the waqf's accumulated funds to erect a 17-room building — the first concrete structure on the site — on the plot of the former Forfor Mustafa Paşa mansion. Although planned as a primary school, it was converted into a lycée by decision of the Ministry of National Education because of local demand for secondary schooling, and the Ministry chose the name Pertevniyal Lisesi to honour the school's founder. Full secondary instruction under the new name began on 15 October 1930.

A four-classroom annex built in 1937 opened for teaching in the 1938–1939 school year; after the demolition of the Aksaray Post Office, this annex served as a post office from 1954 until it was returned to the school in September 1964. Between 1949 and 1951 the lycée classes were temporarily moved to the teachers' college building in Çapa, while the Aksaray campus operated as a middle school. To relieve chronic overcrowding, a larger modern building with 17 classrooms, four laboratories and a gymnasium was completed on the campus in 1968.

In November 1986 the school was relocated to the Higher Teachers' School building in Çapa during a comprehensive restoration, and the Ottoman Archives were installed in its historic Aksaray building. Following a sustained campaign by the school's administration, foundation, alumni and students, the school returned to its Aksaray campus in 1992. It was later designated a "super lycée" and, in 1998, an Anatolian High School.

== Campus ==
The school stands on Atatürk Boulevard in Aksaray, adjacent to the Pertevniyal Valide Sultan Mosque, in the historic centre of Istanbul. The campus consists of three buildings: the main administrative building (Building A), the oldest structure on the site, housing administrative offices, classrooms, a meeting room and a library; Building B, with classrooms and computer laboratories; and Building C, containing further classrooms, science laboratories, a gymnasium and a 300-seat conference hall.

== Academics and admissions ==
Pertevniyal is a coeducational state school. Admission is through Turkey's national High School Entrance System (LGS) examination, and the school regularly ranks among the most selective public high schools in Istanbul. Since 2021, the programme has lasted five years, including an English preparatory year. As of 2024, the school enrolled around 750 students taught by approximately 60 teachers.

== Traditions ==
The school community maintains one of Turkey's oldest alumni networks. The Pertevniyal Alumni Association (Pertevniyal Lisesi'nden Yetişenler Derneği) was founded in 1947, and a related education foundation and sports club also serve the school. Each October the association organises the traditional "Pilav ve Aşure Günü" (Rice and Aşure Day), a reunion that draws thousands of graduates to the school's courtyard, including many of its well-known alumni.

== Notable alumni ==
- Tevfik Fikret, poet, attended the school's predecessor, the Mahmudiye Rüştiyesi
- Hüseyin Rahmi Gürpınar, novelist
- Şevket Rado, journalist and writer
- Cemil Meriç, writer and translator
- Oğuz Tansel, poet and folklorist
- Fehmi Yavuz, professor of urban planning
- Çetin Özek, professor of criminal law
- Metin Erksan, film director
- Halit Kıvanç, broadcaster and sports commentator
- Aydın Boysan, architect and essayist
- Doğan Hızlan, literary critic
- Metin Akpınar, actor and comedian
- Zihni Göktay, theatre actor
- Ali Poyrazoğlu, actor and director
- Neco, singer
- Savaş Ay, journalist and television presenter
- Hüsamettin Özkan, politician, former Deputy Prime Minister of Turkey
- Yaşar Okuyan, politician, former Minister of Labour
- Seray Şahiner, writer
