= Elçin Sevgi Suçin =

Poet and writer from Turkey

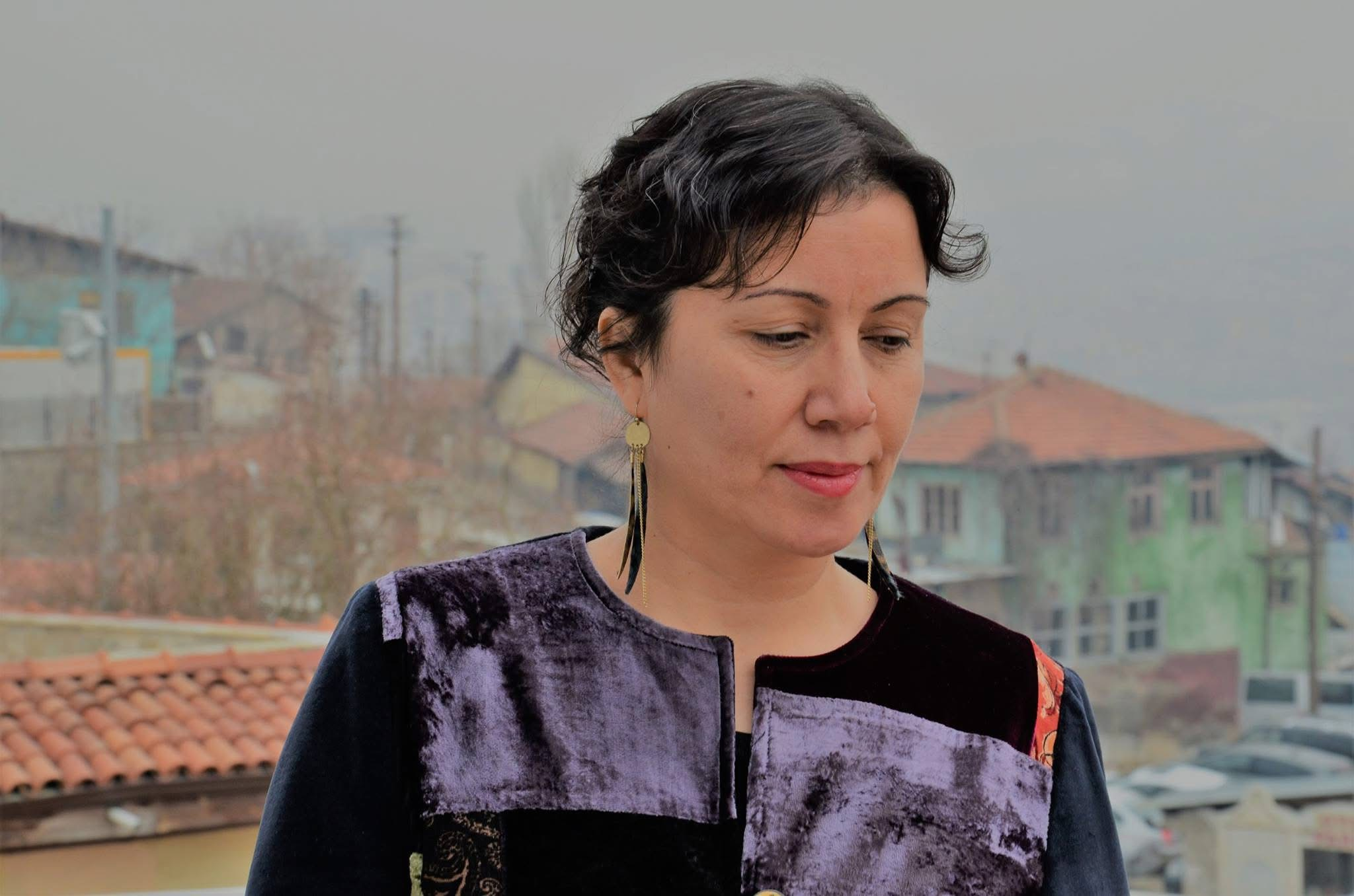
- Born: 1971 (age 54–55); Denizli, Turkey
- Occupations: Poet, writer, poetry critic
- Writing career
- Language: Turkish
- Notable awards: Metin Altıok Poetry Award (2026); Yunus Nadi Poetry Award (2024)

Elçin Sevgi Suçin (born 1971 in Denizli, Turkey) is a poet, writer and poetry critic from Turkey. She mainly writes poetry and literary criticism.

For her poetry collection 51. Bölge (Area 51), she received the Yunus Nadi Poetry Award in 2024. In 2026, she was awarded the Metin Altıok Poetry Award for Paralize Zaman Diyalogları (Dialogues in Paralyzed Time).

== Literary career ==
Her poems and literary criticism have appeared in various literary magazines, including Varlık and Sadece Şiir. In her critical writings, she has examined the poetics of several poets, including Gülten Akın, Lâle Müldür Özdemir İnce, Nilgün Marmara, Haydar Ergülen Veysel Çolak Gültekin Emre.

Her poems have been translated into several languages, including English, Arabic, Spanish, Italian, German, and Persian.

In 2025, Banipal featured Suçin as its "Guest Poet", publishing a selection of her poems in Spanish translation by Çağla Işıl Soykan. In the same year, her poetry collection Paralize Zaman Diyalogları (Dialogues in Paralyzed Time) was published in Albanian as Dialogjet e kohës së paralizuar.

== Critical reception ==
In a 2026 essay published in Varlık, Samet Polat analyzed Suçin's poetry through the concept of the "plurality of the subject". Polat argued that Dialogues in Paralyzed Time constructs a poetic field around existence, identity, social criticism, metapoetics and the poetics of space, presenting a fragmented and polyphonic lyrical subject rather than a purely autobiographical voice.

== Works ==
=== Poetry collections ===
- Paralize Zaman Diyalogları (English: Dialogues in Paralyzed Time). Everest Yayınları, Istanbul 2025, ISBN 978-625-369-386-2.
- 51. Bölge (English: Area 51). Everest Yayınları, Istanbul 2024, ISBN 978-625-369-113-4.
- Aşktan ve Savaştan Başka Nedir ki Hatırlanan? (English: What Else Is Remembered Except Love and War?). Kırmızı Yayınları, Istanbul 2015, ISBN 978-605-5411-73-2.
- Büyüklere Şiirler Büyüleyen Hayatlar (English: Poems Dedicated to the Master Poets). Kurgan Yayınları, Ankara 2012, ISBN 978-975-267-649-7.

=== Translated works ===
- Dialogjet e kohës së paralizuar. Translated into Albanian by Shyngyl Sylajmani and edited by Jeton Kelmendi. IWA Bogdani, Prishtina 2025, ISBN 978-9951-39-452-9.

== Awards ==
- Oeneumi Literary Award, 2026, for the best poetry cycle at the 30th International Poetry Festival “Ditët e Naimit” (Days of Naim) in Tetovo, North Macedonia.
- Metin Altıok Poetry Award, 2026, for Paralize Zaman Diyalogları.
- Yunus Nadi Poetry Award, 2024, for 51. Bölge.
