= Halit Kıvanç =

Turkish TV and radio presenter (1925–2022)

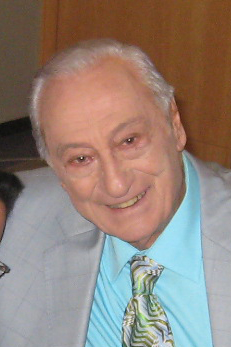
- Kıvanç in 2008
- Born: Halit Ahmet Kıvanç; 18 February 1925; Fatih, Istanbul, Turkey
- Died: 25 October 2022 (aged 97); Istanbul, Turkey
- Resting place: Zincirlikuyu Cemetery
- Education: Law
- Alma mater: Istanbul University
- Occupations: Television presenter; radio presenter; humorist; sports commentator; sports journalist; writer
- Spouse: Bülbin Kıvanç (m. 1955)
- Children: 1

Halit Ahmet Kıvanç (18 February 1925 – 25 October 2022) was a Turkish television and radio presenter, humorist, sports journalist and writer. He was best known as a sports commentator.

== Early years ==
Kıvanç was born in the Fatih district of Istanbul to trader Ahmet and his wife Leman, the youngest of five siblings. His precise birthday is not known, as at that time Turkey was still using the Rumi calendar and would not transition to the Gregorian calendar for another few months. However, official documents give his birthday as February 18, 1925.

Kıvanç completed his secondary education at Pertevniyal High School in Aksaray, Istanbul. At the last grade just before the graduation, he lost his father. His brother Kemal did not allow him to earn money for the family, instead he wished that Halit go to the university. Halit then studied law at Istanbul University. Following his graduation, he attended military service for duty.

In 1950, Halit Kıvanç entered civil service to become a judge. Following a brief period of apprenticeship, he was appointed judge in Kozluk, a small town in southeastern Turkey that became shortly before a district of then Siirt Province. He served at this post in a region of deprivation only for couple of months. Kıvanç resigned and returned to Istanbul to pursue a career as a journalist that offered him much more income.

== Career ==
Already during his university years, Halit Kıvanç was interested in journalism. His articles were published in the Law Faculty's periodical Guguk ("Cuckoo" for English). His vested interest in football, led him to write in the sports weekly Şut ("Shoot"). Later, his writings on humor got him ahead. His professional journalism career began as he was discovered by Yusuf Ziya Ortaç, the publisher of that time's notable illustrated satire and humor magazine Akbaba ("Vulture"), after his first joke was printed.

Kıvanç wrote sketches for the TRT's Radio Istanbul. Kıvanç became then a narrator as he was asked to tell the stories he wrote.

Kıvanç also wrote sports reports primarily in the newspapers Milliyet, Tercüman, Hürriyet and Güneş among others. His career as a sports commentator, which made him later famous, began as he was asked during a trip to comment on sports events that he reported in the daily Milliyet. He commented on Turkey's participation at major sports events like Olympic Games and various World championships on radio and television. Halit Kıvanç and two friends of his established in 1953 Turkey's first daily sports only newspaper Türkiye Spor. He gave up his career as a sports commentator in 1983 after the Turkish President's Football Cup.

Between 1963-1964, he was almost a year-long with the British Broadcasting Corporation (BBC) in the United Kingdom for training, just before television broadcasting was launched in Turkey.

In addition to all his engagements, Kıvanç was a popular on-stage presenter asked for musical events and contests. He hosted a talk show named "Halit Kıvanç'la Ustalar" (literally: "Masters with Halit Kıvanç") Sundays on the Turkish television channel NTV. Moreover, as a strong fan of Fenerbahçe S.K., he presented another talk show called "Efsanenin yeni 100 yılı" ("The Legendary's new century") at Fenerbahçe TV.

== Achievements ==
Halit Kıvanç is considered as the person of firsts in the Turkish journalism.

In 1952, he was sent to Italy by the newspaper Türkiye Ekspres Gazetesi to interview four Turkish footballers (Bülent Eken, Bülent Esen, Şükrü Gülesin, Lefter Küçükandonyadis), who played in Italian clubs. He took this opportunity and visited the Pope in Vatican, becoming the first ever Turkish journalist to be admitted.

At a contest during the World Humorists Conference held in the United States, he came in third.

Due to late application, he did not receive a speaker's booth at Wembley Stadium for broadcasting of the football game between England and Germany at the 1966 FIFA World Cup Final. He commented on the match, which lasted two-and-half-hours with overtime, on radio in Turkey by telephone. The next day, he was told that he became the first ever reporter to give a comment of a World football cup event on the phone.

In 2005, Halit Kıvanç celebrated his 50th anniversary in his career as a sports commentator at a special event organized by the government.

== Personal life and death ==
Kıvanç married in 1955 Bülbin, a pharmacist by profession. The couple had a son Ümit Kıvanç (born 1956), who was a columnist of the daily Radikal.

Kıvanç died on 25 October 2022, at the age of 97. Two days later, he was buried at Zincirlikuyu Cemetery.

== Bibliography ==
His memoirs are summarized in his book Gool Diye Diye (literally: "Shouting Goal!").

=== Own works ===
- Ve Allah Gazeteciyi Yarattı (1959) İstanbul Matbaası
- Kazulet Hanımın Minisi. (with Altan Erbulak) (1968) Altın Kitaplar
- Mikrofonunu Kordonuna Göre Uzat (1977) Meta Yayınları
- Beckenbauer Futbol Okulu. (translation) (1977) Kelebek Yayınları
- Gülmece Güldürmece (1978) (1st print).Kelebek Çocuk Kitapları
- Ve Karşınızda Halit Kıvanç (1979) (1st print) Milliyet yayınları 1980, Karacan yayınları
- Gelin Yarışalım (1982) Kelebek Yayınları
- Halit Kıvanç Anlatıyor Üç Yüz Otuz Üç Fıkra (1982) Karacan yayınları
- Gool Diye Diye (1983) Hürriyet Yayınları
- Hadi Anlat Bakalım Anılar 1 (1998) (3rd print ) Yorum Kitapları
- Bulutlarla Yarışan Kadın, Halit Kıvanç Sabiha Gökçen'le söyleşiyor (1998) Yapı Kredi Yayınları.
- Çok Affedersiniz Ama... (1999) Aksoy Yayıncılık
- Telesafir Bizde TV Böyle Başladı (2002) Remzi Kitabevi
- Kupaların Kupası Dünya Kupası 1930'dan 2002'ye (2002) Türkiye İş Bankası Kültür Yayınları
- Futbol! Bir Aşk... (2004) İletişim Yayınları. ISBN 9750502574
- Ağlama Palyaço Makyajın Bozulur Müjdat Gezen Kitabı (2006) Türkiye İş Bankası Kültür Yayınları. ISBN 9754588368

=== About him ===
- Engin, Aydın Bir Koltukta Kaç Karpuz Halit Kıvanç Kitabı, Türkiye İş Bankası Kültür Yayınları/Nehir Söyleşi Dizisi. ISBN 9789754584813

== Discography ==
45 rpm vinyl singles

- Şampiyonlar Şarkısı Side A- "Şampiyonlar Şarkısı" Vasfi Uçaroğlu Orchestra, Side B- "Şampiyonların 15 Golü" football matches commented by Halit Kıvanç (1965) Ezgi Plakları. 45-104 Spor Serisi No: 1
- Side A- Metin Geliyor Metin" fan music by Şevket Uğurluer, Side B- "Kralın Golleri" by Halit Kıvanç. (1966) Ezgi Plakları. 45-105
- Kıbrıs 74 (1974) Music concert of Ajda Pekkan and Modern Folk Trio presented by Halit Kıvanç. (1974) Balet Plak
