= Pertevniyal Sultan =

Valide Sultan of the Ottoman Empire from 1861 to 1876

- Valide Sultan

Valide sultan of the Ottoman Empire
- Tenure: 25 June 1861 – 30 May 1876
- Predecessor: Bezmiâlem Sultan
- Successor: Şevkefza Sultan
- Born: Besime c. 1812
- Died: 5 February 1883 (aged 70–71); Ortaköy Palace, Ortaköy, Constantinople, Ottoman Empire (present day Istanbul, Turkey)
- Burial: Pertevniyal Valide Sultan Mosque Aksaray, Istanbul
- Spouse: Mahmud II
- Issue: Abdulaziz; Şehzade Nizameddin (disputed)
Names
- Turkish: Pertevniyal Sultan; Ottoman Turkish: پرتو نهال سلطان
- House: Ottoman (by marriage)
- Religion: Sunni Islam

Pertevniyal Sultan (Ottoman Turkish: پرتو نهال سلطان, c. 1812 – 5 February 1883) was a consort of the Ottoman Sultan Mahmud II, and Valide sultan (queen mother) of their son, Sultan Abdulaziz.

== Early life ==
The family lineage of Pertevniyal Sultan is disputed. She was most likely of Circassian origin, but it was also written that she was of Romani or Kurdish descent. Her birthname was Besime. She was a close friend of Hoshiyar Qadin, consort to Ibrahim Pasha of Egypt, and mother of his son Ismail Pasha, Khedive of Egypt and Sudan from 1863 to 1879. She became a consort of Ottoman Sultan Mahmud II when he happened to notice her working in a hamam in Istanbul, and was given the title of "Second Ikbal". She gave birth to a son, Şehzade Abdulaziz, on 8 February 1830. She may have given birth to a second son in 1833, Şehzade Nizameddin, but according to other sources Nizameddin was the son of the consort Tiryal Hanım. As the mother of one of Mahmud's only two surviving sons, she was promoted to the rank of "Fifth Kadın".

== As Valide Sultan ==
=== Abdulaziz's accession ===
The final illness of Sultan Abdulmejid I in 1861 initiated a spate of rumors that a group in the palace wanted Murad to succeed to the throne instead of Abdulaziz. There seems to have been no truth in these allegations, but they nevertheless worried Abdulaziz and especially his mother, Pertevniyal. On the night when Abdulmejid died and the grand vizier, the kapudan pasha, and the commander-in-chief of the Army conducted Abdulaziz from the heir's suite to the ruler's suite in Dolmabahçe Palace, Pertevniyal thought that they were taking him prisoner. They waited in the sultan's suite until the imperial cliques were ready, and then escorted Abdulaziz to Topkapı Palace, the palace of his forebears, to await the gathering of the council of ministers, some of whom had to be summoned from their homes up the Bosphorus. Pertevniyal followed him there to reassure herself.

=== Influence over Abdulaziz ===
Pertevniyal exerted some influence over her son. When Abdulaziz took his trip to Europe, Pertevniyal was anxious about him the whole time he was away. On his way home he stopped at Ruse, Bulgaria, where Midhat was governor, with the intention of a month and acquainting himself with the Balkan country. But Pertevniyal, a possessive and short-sighted woman, wrote him to come home immediately. Sultan of Turkey though he was, he obeyed his mother's command.

Pertevniyal contributed to the instability of her son's rule by meddling in affairs of state. Especially unwise was her alliance with Mahmud Nedim Pasha, the sycophantic grand vizier whose recklessness and incompetence led to further financial chaos. There was such an outcry against Mahmud Nedim that he finally fell from power in 1876 and was succeeded by Midhat Pasha, who did his best to get the Empire on a sounder financial footing. There was sum of 100,000 Turkish lira unaccounted for in the budget, and Midhat discovered that it had been appropriated by Mahmud Nedim.

Privately Mahmud Nedim disclosed that the money had not been spent by him but had gone to the palace, presumably to the valide sultan. Mahmud Nedim was exiled from the capital for a while, but with the valide's power backing was soon able to return. Midhat's efforts at financial reform were blocked, and he was replaced by Mahmud Nedim. Finally, when talk of Abdulaziz's deposition was in the air, Pertevniyal sent a harem agha to Midhat requesting him to prepare a document giving his advice on how her son could save his throne. Midhat carefully composed such a document which was approved by the valide, but neither she nor anyone else had the courage at this point, with the sultan in a highly nervous state, to submit to him.

=== Diplomacy and engagements ===
Pertevniyal was invisible but instrumental in politics. In February 1863, she arranged for Isma'il to meet Abdulaziz in private in her palace. In summer of 1864, Isma'il's mother Hoshiyar Qadin traveled to Istanbul, to help her son. She arrived with proposed new heir in question, her grandson Tewfik Pasha, lots of money, and female diplomacy. In spring of 1866, they launched the greatest attack, in which the good offices of Pertevniyal may have been involved. In September 1867, Hoshiyar threw a dinner at her own palace in the shores of the Bosphorus in honour of Pertevniyal. Pertevniyal returned the hospitality with an invitation of Hoshiyar to the Dolmabahçe Palace.

In 1868, Empress Eugénie of France paid a visit to the Ottoman Empire. She was taken by the sultan to his mother in the Dolmabahçe Palace, but reportedly, Pertevniyal became outraged by the presence of a foreign woman in her harem, and greeted the Empress with a slap in the face, almost provoking an international incident. The visit of the Empress, however, did leave a lasting effect by making Western fashion popular among the harem women. In 1869, she met with the Princess of Wales Alexandra of Denmark, when the latter visited Istanbul with her husband Prince of Wales Edward (future Edward VII).

== Charities ==
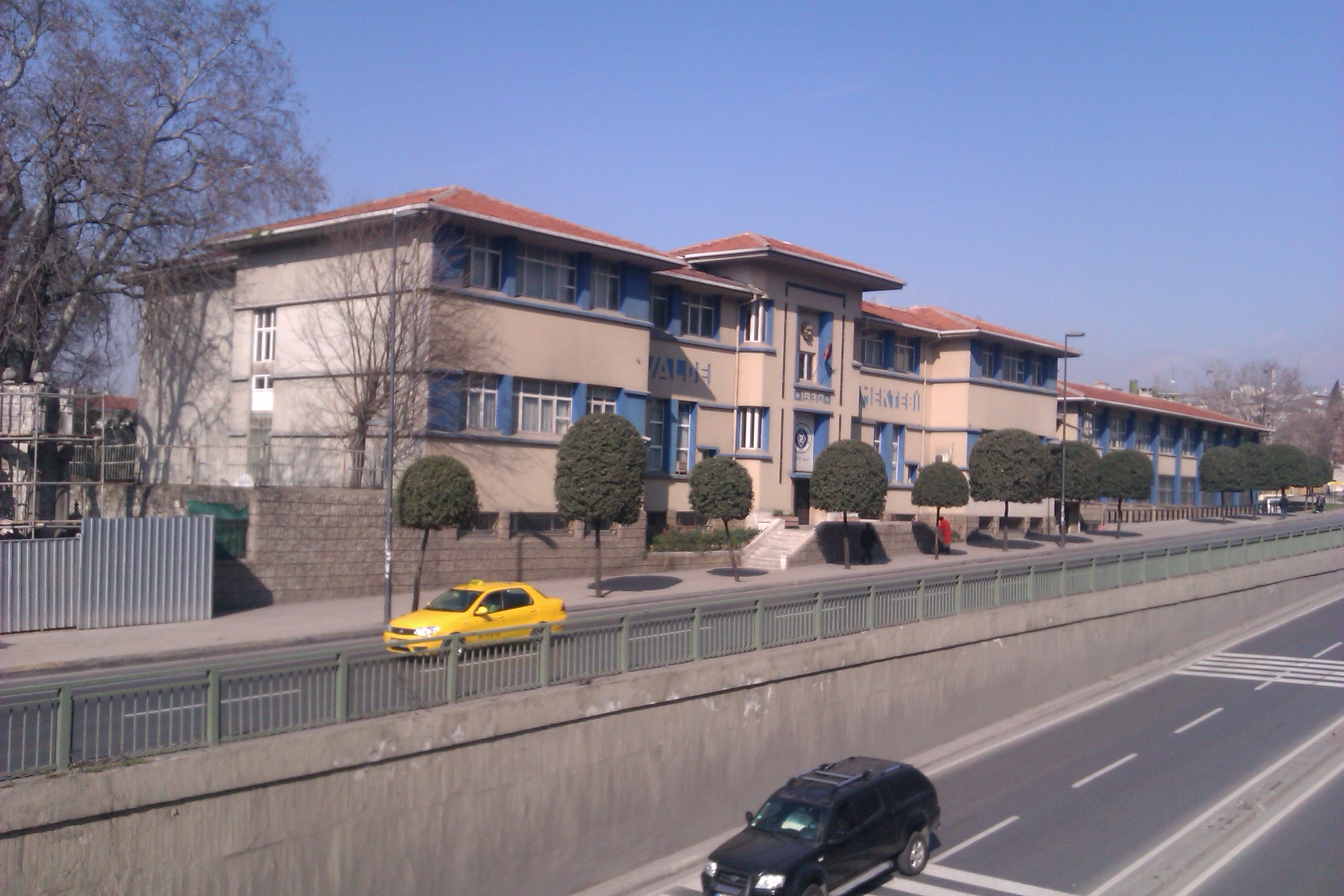
Pertevniyal Anatolian High School

She founded the Pertevniyal High School as well as Pertevniyal Valide Sultan Mosque in 1872. In the days when the Hejaz was part of the Empire, the Porte tried to improve the health situation there. Pertevniyal built hospitals in the Harem-i Sherif, and young Turkish doctors went out from Istanbul to man them.

Pertevniyal Sultan was a great philanthropist, and thanks to her influence, she had the opportunity to make her son do whatever she wanted. In order to provide income to the foundations that she intended to establish, lands called Fasil fields, she commissioned a fountain in front of the Kâtib Mosque in October 1862, and then it was removed from the square and moved to the entrance door of the mosque on the grounds that it narrowed the road. She also built three fountains, one in Suboyu (Bige) village and two on Karaköy road in Şebinkarahisar. In 1864, she built a shipbuilding pool (stone loom) in Tersane to cover her own income. The first Ottoman battleship came out of this loom.

== Involvement in Illicit Slave Trade ==
Pertevniyal Sultan was directly involved in the buying and selling of slaves to elite households of Istanbul and the harem, despite it having been made illegal in the empire over the previous decades. She targeted Circassians fleeing the genocide being committed by the Russian Empire. She instructing the governer of Trabzon to reserve girls from refugee shops for her before showing them to anyone else. She complained that they “vanished as soon as the ship arrived in the Bosphorus” with the best girls being taken by other slave traders. Note this slave trade would almost certainly have involved the buying and selling of Muslim slaves, which is illegal in Islamic, as well as Ottoman law.

== Last years ==
When Murad V ascended the throne after the deposition of Abdulaziz, he appointed his mother Şevkefza Kadın's reported chief ally, Damat Nuri Pasha, as Lord Pasha, after which Şevkefza and Damat were to have confiscated all the gold coins and jewelry hidden away by Pertevniyal in the harem of Dolmabahçe Palace. The sealed apartments of Pertevniyal were opened and from them eight chests of gold and four chests of debentures were removed. Eight porters were needed to lift each one of the chests with gold. It was said these eight chests contained 5,120 okkas of gold.

Midhat Pasha and the other ministers presumed that the former monarch's mother was one of those behind Hasan Bey's rebellion. So they transferred her to Topkapı Palace and cut off all her communication with the outside. Pertevniyal spent three full months moaning and wailing in the veritable prison of her rooms in Topkapı. A few times she sent word to Şevkefza, hoping that she would help put an end to her anguish, but Şevkefza was always afraid of anything that could stir up trouble.

Sultan Abdul Hamid II had loved Pertevniyal since he was a little boy. He was more devoted to her than to Perestu Kadın, who had raised him, and so as soon as he became Sultan his mind turned to the days of torment that Pertevniyal had passed in Topkapı Palace. He sent men to move her and her entourage to one of the villas in Ortaköy, thereby delighting her and repairing the injustice done her. He visited her every day until the day she died.

Pertevniyal was despondent after the death of her son. Her only pleasure and distraction lay in passing time by training young and lovely children (including Müşfika Kadın, later the eighth wife of Abdul Hamid II), gathering them about her and finding consolation in the things they did and their sweet behaviour. Pertevniyal Sultan had another habit between the dusk and the night time prayer. She would prostrate herself in worship, weeping loudly as she cried out, "I forgive everything, only I seek justice for the blood of my son!" Afterwards in her room she would have the Quran recited and then have the children say "Amen".

== Death ==
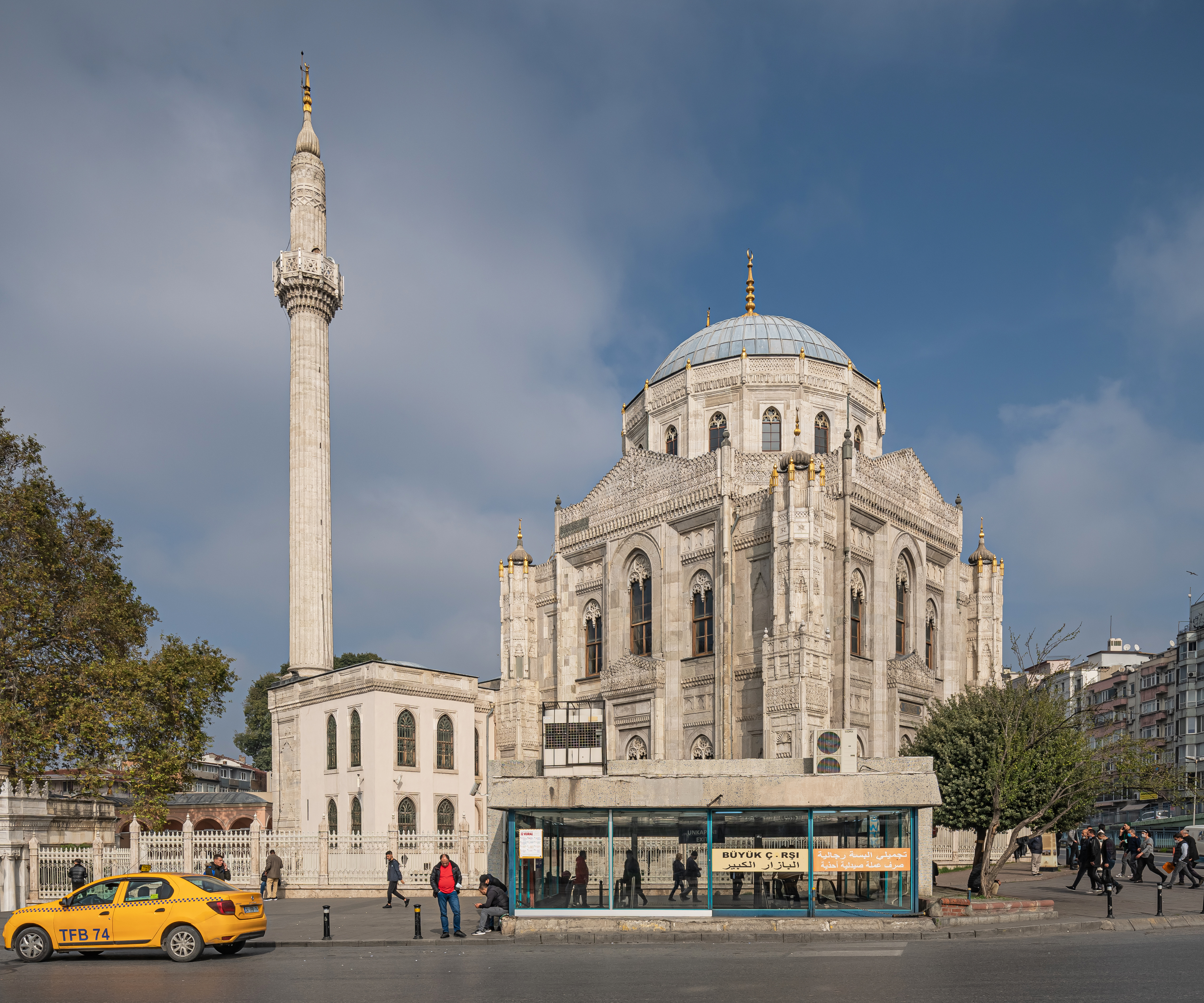
Pertevniyal Valide Sultan Mosque, Aksaray, Istanbul, resting place of Pertevniyal Sultan

Pertevniyal Sultan died on 5 February 1883 at the age of seventy in the Ortaköy Palace, Istanbul, and was buried at the Pertevniyal Valide Sultan Mosque in Aksaray, Istanbul.

== Issue ==
Together with Mahmud, Pertevniyal had at least one son:

- Abdulaziz (Istanbul, Turkey, 8 February 1830 - Çırağan Palace, 4 June 1876, buried in Tomb of Sultan Mahmud II, Fatih, Istanbul). 32nd Sultan of Ottoman Empire.

Maybe she was also the mother of:

- Şehzade Nizameddin (29 December 1833 – March 1838). Sources variously report that he was the son of either Pertevniyal Kadın or Tiryal Hanım.

== See also ==
- Pertevniyal Valide Sultan Mosque
- List of sultans of the Ottoman Empire
- Line of succession to the Ottoman throne
- Ottoman family tree

== Sources ==
- Brookes, Douglas Scott (2010). The Concubine, the Princess, and the Teacher: Voices from the Ottoman Harem. University of Texas Press. ISBN 978-0-292-78335-5.
- Davis, Fanny (1986). The Ottoman Lady: A Social History from 1718 to 1918. Greenwood Publishing Group. ISBN 978-0-313-24811-5.
- Mestyan, Adam (November 3, 2020). Arab Patriotism: The Ideology and Culture of Power in Late Ottoman Egypt. Princeton University Press. ISBN 978-0-691-20901-2.
- Sakaoğlu, Necdet (2008). Bu Mülkün Kadın Sultanları: Vâlide Sultanlar, Hâtunlar, Hasekiler, Kandınefendiler, Sultanefendiler. Oğlak Yayıncılık. ISBN 978-6-051-71079-2.
- Uluçay, M. Çağatay (2011). Padişahların kadınları ve kızları. Ötüken. ISBN 978-975-437-840-5.

Ottoman royalty
Preceded by Bezmiâlem Sultan	Valide Sultan; 25 June 1861 – 30 May 1876	Succeeded by Şevkefza Kadın
