= Gezgin =

GEZGIN, GEZGİN or Gezgin may refer to:

== Military ==
- Gezgin missile, Turkish cruise missile
- 211th air squadron ("Gezgin") stationed at Etimesgut Air Base, Turkey

== Surname ==
- Damla Gezgin (born 1990), Turkish national-level basketball player
- Hakkı Süha Gezgin (1895–1963), Turkish journalist, writer, translator, and teacher
- İsmail Gezgin (born 1965), Turkish archaeologist and author

== Other ==
- GEZGİN, ("GErçek Zamanda Görüntü İşleyeN"), a Turkish microprocessor, see RASAT
- Gezgin, a 1976 collection of poems by Turkish poet Metin Altıok
