= Milliyet Çocuk =

Children's magazine in Turkey (1972–1990)

- Categories: Children's magazine
- Frequency: Weekly
- Founded: 1972
- Final issue: 1990
- Country: Turkey
- Based in: Istanbul
- Language: Turkish

Milliyet Çocuk was a Turkish language children's magazine which existed between 1972 and 1990 with one-year hiatus.

== History and profile ==
Milliyet Çocuk was launched in 1972. The magazine was part of Milliyet group which was owned by Karacan family and produced Milliyet newspaper. Milliyet Çocuk was a supplement to Milliyet until 1974 when it became an independent publication. It featured several cartoon serials such as Larry Yuma by Carlo Boscarato and Claudio Nizzi and Lucky Luke by Morris and René Goscinny. The magazine folded in 1976 due to the low circulation levels. Next year Milliyet Çocuk was restarted as a weekly magazine, and the founding editor-in-chief was a Turkish poet, Ülkü Tamer. The magazine became a success soon after its restart and sold nearly 100,000 copies. In the second period Milliyet Çocuk featured work by significant literary figures. The magazine folded in April 1989.

Milliyet Çocuk was restarted on 5 January 1990, but it permanently ceased publication only after two issues.
