= Güven Turan =

Turkish writer (1943)

- Born: December 2, 1943 (age 82); Sinop
- Education: Ankara University
- Occupations: Poet, writer, translator
- Writing career
- Years active: 1981–present
- Notable awards: 2016 PEN Turkey Poetry Award

Güven Turan (born 2 December 1943 , Gerze), a Turkish poet, writer, translator.

== Biography ==
He was born in Sinop, Gerze in 1944, and completed his secondary education at Maarif College in Samsun. He graduated from Ankara University, Faculty of Language, History, and Geography, Department of English Language and Literature in 1968. He completed his master's degree at the same university in 1973 and worked as an English lecturer. 1976–1995 working advertising unit in Istanbul.

== Bibliography ==
=== Poem ===
- Güneşler... Gölgeler... (1981)
- Peş (1982)
- Sevda Yorumları (1990)
- Bir Albümde Dört Mevsim (1991)
- İkaros’un Uçuşu (1993)
- Toplu Şiirler (1995)
- 101 Bir Dize (1996)
- Gizli Alanlar (1997)
- Görülen Kentler (1999)
- İz Sürmek (2001)
- Cendere (2003)
- Çıkış (2008)

=== Story ===
- Düş Günler (1989)
- Zemberek (2009)

=== Novel ===
- Dalyan (1978)
- Yalnız mısın? (1987)
- Soğuk Tüylü Martı (1992)
- Bakır Çalığı (1994)
- Yazıyla Yaşamak (1996)
- Çerçevenin Dışından (2004)

=== Essay- criticism ===
- Kendini Okumak (1987)
- Bakır Çalığı (1994 / 2006)
- Yazıyla Yaşamak (1996)
- Çerçevenin Dışından (2004)
- Süregelen (2005)
- Kuleden Bakmak (2012)

=== Translations ===
- Aşk ve İsyan (K. Rexroth’tan seçme şiirler, 1991)
- Sınırsızdır Şiir (M. Holub’dan seçme şiirler, 1993)
- Seçme Şiirler (L. Glück’ten, 1994)
- Seçme Şiirler (W. C. Williams’tan, 1995)
- Seçme Şiirler (H. D.’den, 1995)
- Demir Adam/Demir Kadın: T. Hughes (2001)
- Raşid’in Dürbünü (J. Mahjoub, 2003).

== Awards ==
Güven Turan won the 1979 Turkish Language Association Novel Award with Dalyan, the 1990 Yunus Nadi Published Story Book Award with Dream Günler, the 1991 Yunus Nadi Unpublished Poetry Book Award with Four Seasons in an Album, the 2004 Golden Orange Poetry Award with Cendere' nude won.
