= Ülkü Tamer =

Turkish writer (1937–2018)

- Born: February 20, 1937; Gaziantep, Turkey
- Died: April 1, 2018 (aged 81); Bodrum, Turkey
- Occupations: Writer, translator, poet
- Writing career
- Language: Turkish

Ülkü Tamer, (20 February 1937–1 April 2018) was a Turkish poet, journalist, actor and translator.

== Biography ==
Born in Gaziantep, the artist is the eldest of three sons (Ülkü, Aykut, Tankut) of Hasan Tahsin Bey, one of the first weavers of Antep, and Fatma Hanım, who is known as the first bride of Antep from outside the province (Eskişehir). Ülkü Tamer's father, Hasan Tahsin Bey, said, "He is one of the resistance fighters who fought against the French in the siege of Antep. He was a member of the Mağarabaşı group, which melted the bullets in the mosques and made ammunition and fired bullets at the enemy, and was awarded the Independence Medal. He died on 1 April 2018 in Bodrum, Muğla.

He is one of the leading representatives of the Second New poetry movement that emerged in the 1950s. He has translated more than seventy books and prepared poetry anthologies. He served as the editor-in-chief of Milliyet Çocuk, a children's magazine.

== Bibliography ==
- Soğuk Otların Altında (1959)
- Gök Onları Yanıltmaz (1960)
- Ezra ile Gary (1962)
- Virgülün Başından Geçenler (1965)
- İçime Çektiğim Hava Değil Gökyüzüdür (1966)
- Sıragöller (1974)
- Seçme Şiirler (1981)
- Antep Neresi (1986)
- Yanardağın Üstündeki Kuş (1986, toplu şiirler)
- Güneş Topla Benim İçin (2014, Toplu Şiirler) Islık yayınları, ISBN 978-605-9018-13-5
- Lucia (2020, kitaplarına girmemiş şiirleri)

== Awards ==
He won the TDK 1965 Translation Award with his translation of Mythology from Edith Hamilton. He won the 1967 Yeditepe Poetry Award for his book "İçime Çektiğim Hava Değil Gökyüzüdür" (1966), the Endre Ady Award given by the People's Republic of Hungary for his translations in 1979, and the 1991 Yunus Nadi Award for his short story book "Alleben Öyküleri", In 2014, he was deemed worthy of the Melih Cevdet Anday Poetry Award with his book "Bir Name Is Journey".
