= Doğan Hızlan =

Turkish author (born 1937)

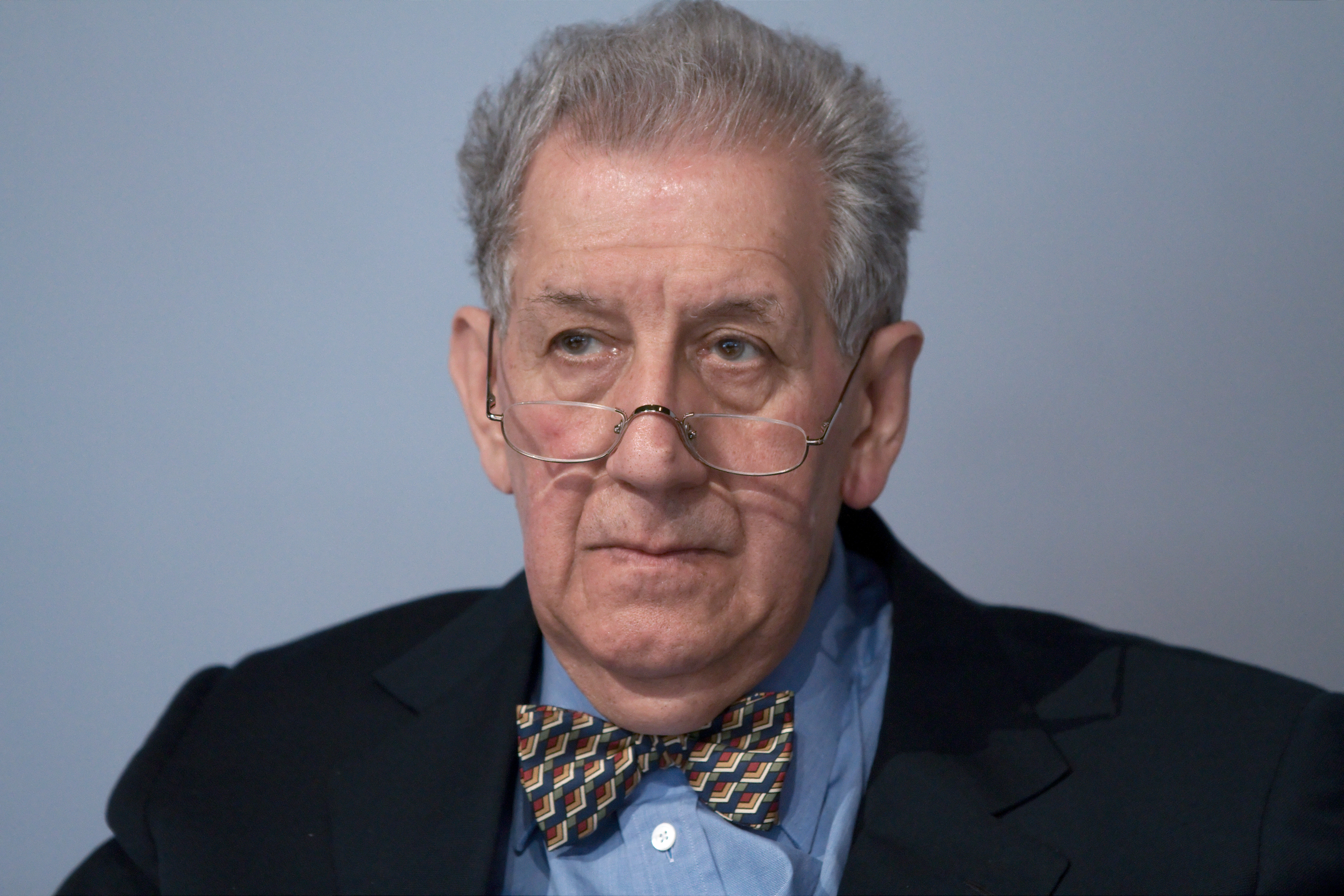
- Born: December 23, 1937 (age 88) Istanbul
- Occupation: Journalist, writer
- Language: Turkish
- Citizenship: Turkey
- Education: Istanbul University, Faculty of Law
- Years active: 1954–
- Notable awards: T.C. Cumhurbaşkanlığı Kültür ve Sanat Büyük Ödülü

Doğan Hızlan (born 23 December 1937, Istanbul) is a Turkish author.

He graduated from Pertevniyal High School, then completed his bachelor's degree in Istanbul University Faculty of Law. Doğan Hızlan, whose first work was published in 1954, directed the art pages of various literary magazines and newspapers, Cumhuriyet among them. He also published reviews in many newspapers and magazines.

In 1980, he prepared a collection of children's stories called Bayram Gömleği. He prepared all of Ercümend Behzad Lav's works for publication. Finally, together with İhsan Yılmaz, he published Celâl Sılay's Collected Poems under the name Hüsran Filizleri. His most recent book is Aynadaki Bakışlar, which consists of book writings published in Hürriyet Pazar.

In February 2012, a library was opened in the Antalya Atatürk Culture Park in his name and 20,000 books were donated to this library.

He still continues to write for Hürriyet Newspaper and to prepare and present the "Scrapbook" program on TRT 2. He continues to contribute to the development of Turkish literature.

== Bibliography ==
=== Written by Hızlan ===
- Yazılı ilişkiler : İnceleme-deneme eleştiri (Altın Kitap, 1983)
- Günlerde kalan : Çağdaş edebiyatımıza dipnotları (Gür, 1983)
- Sanat Günah Çıkarıyor (Bilgi, 1992)
- Kitaplar kitabı : eleştiri (YKY, 1996)
- Saklı su: deneme (YKY, 1996)
- Ne Kadar Mozart O Kadar Süt (Milliyet, 1996)
- Söyleşiler (Milliyet, 1997, 2001)
- Güncelin çağrısı (YKY, 1997)
- Düzyazı Ayracı (Kitaplar Kitabı II), review (YKY, 2001)
- Mavi Bereli : Edebiyat ve Dil Yazıları, deneme (YKY, 2001)
- Düzyazı Ayracı (YKY, 2001)
- On Birinci Kat Yazıları (Doğan, 2001)
- Şiir Çilingiri (Kitaplar Kitabı I), review (YKY, 2001)
- 1980–2000 Gösteri Yazıları (Doğan, 2001)
- Edebiyat Dönencesi : Yazılar (YKY, 2003)
- Yalnızlık Kahvesi (YKY, 2003)
- Eleği Duvardan İndirelim (Dünya, 2005)
- Aynadaki Bakışlar (Kitaplar Kitabı 3) (Doğan, 2006)
- Edebiyat Daima (Doğan, 2006)
- Sönmüş Kibritin İzinde (Doğan, 2006)
- Çalıntı Kitap Deposu (Kırmızı, 2007)
- Cağaloğlu – Hayatın ve Mesleğin Başladığı Yer (Heyamola, 2009)
- Beyoğlu'ndan Esintiler (with Tan Oral) (İKSV, 2008)
- Kitaplarla Kültür Turu (Kitaplar Kitabı 4) (Doğan, 2010)
- Anılarımda Yaşayanlar (YKY, 2010)
- Edebiyatımıza Dipnotlar (YKY, 2010)
- Yeniden Okumak (İş Bankası Kültür Yayınları, 2017)

=== Written about Hızlan ===
- Sevgili Doğan Hızlan. İstanbul: Hürriyet Yayınları, [t.y.]. 72s.
- Kabacalı, Alpay: Doğan Hızlan’la denemenin dönencesinde. İstanbul: Dünya Kitapları, Kasım 2006. 207s. (Yaşamdan Yansımalar)
- Kültür Kaşifi: Doğan Hızlan. İstanbul: Tüyap Tüm Fuarcılık Yapım, 2006. 155s.
- Sanki Bir Roman Kahramanı: “ Doğan Hızlan Kitabı ”. Hazırlayan : Söyleşi: Kürşat Başar. İstanbul: Türkiye İş Bankası Kültür Yayınları, 2006. 381s. (Nehir Söyleşi Dizisi)
- Kabacalı, Alpay: Kültürün Nabzını Tutan Doğan Hızlan. İstanbul: Gürer Yayınları, 2008. 208s. (Portreler: 6)

== Awards ==
- 2011: Presidential Culture and Arts Grand Awards

== Sources ==
- "Tanzimat'tan Bugüne Edebiyatçılar Ansiklopedisi", Cilt 1. Yapı Kredi Yayınları, Mart 2010, 3. baskı, sayfa 515. ISBN 978-75-08-0568-2
- 'Türk Edebiyatı İsimler Sözlüğü' maddesi
- Doğan Hızlan Kaynakçası (1954–2009) – prepared by: Bülent Ağaoğlu
