= İlhan Sami Çomak =

Kurdish poet (born 1973)

- Born: 1973 (age 52–53); Karlıova, Bingöl Province, Turkey
- Citizenship: Turkish
- Writing career
- Notable awards: Sennur Sezer poetry prize

İlhan Sami Çomak (born 1973) is a Kurdish poet from Karlıova in Bingöl Province in Turkey. He was arrested in 1994 and charged with membership of the banned Kurdistan Workers' Party (PKK). In jail, Çomak released eight books of poetry and became one of Turkey's longest serving political prisoners.

== Biography ==
In 1994, Çomak was studying geography at the University of Istanbul when he was arrested and charged with starting a forest fire and being associated with the Kurdistan Workers' Party (PKK). Çomak states that he eventually confessed to the charges under torture. He was tried by a State Security Court, which were known to give harsh sentences to people considered a danger to national security. The European Court of Human Rights ruled that Çomak's prosecution was unlawful in 2007.

Çomak's conviction was appealed in 2013 and 2016 but his life sentence was reconfirmed. Ipek Özel, who visited Çomak in prison, told Global Voices: "There was no military judge at the court this second time but the mentality of the military court and judge was there. They didn't listen to him, to his lawyers and to the witnesses at all."

In 2018, Çomak won the Sennur Sezer poetry prize for his 8th book of poems, Geldim Sana (I Came to You). In March 2020, supporters of Çomak wrote a letter to The Guardian calling on the UK government to put pressure on Turkey to release Çomak.

At the Diyarbekir book fair in 2019, a panel discussion was held about Çomak's work, with moderator C. Hakkı Zariç putting it in the context of a long line of Turkish prison authors including Nâzım Hikmet, Ahmed Arif, Arif Damar and Enver Gökçe.

In February 2020, an event was held at the Poetry Café in London to support Comak and call for his release. The event was organised by Norwegian PEN, whose advisor Caroline Stockford is helping to translate Çomak's poetry and publish it in English.

On 26 November 2024, Çomak was released from prison.
