= Pertevniyal Valide Sultan Mosque =

Mosque in Istanbul, Turkey

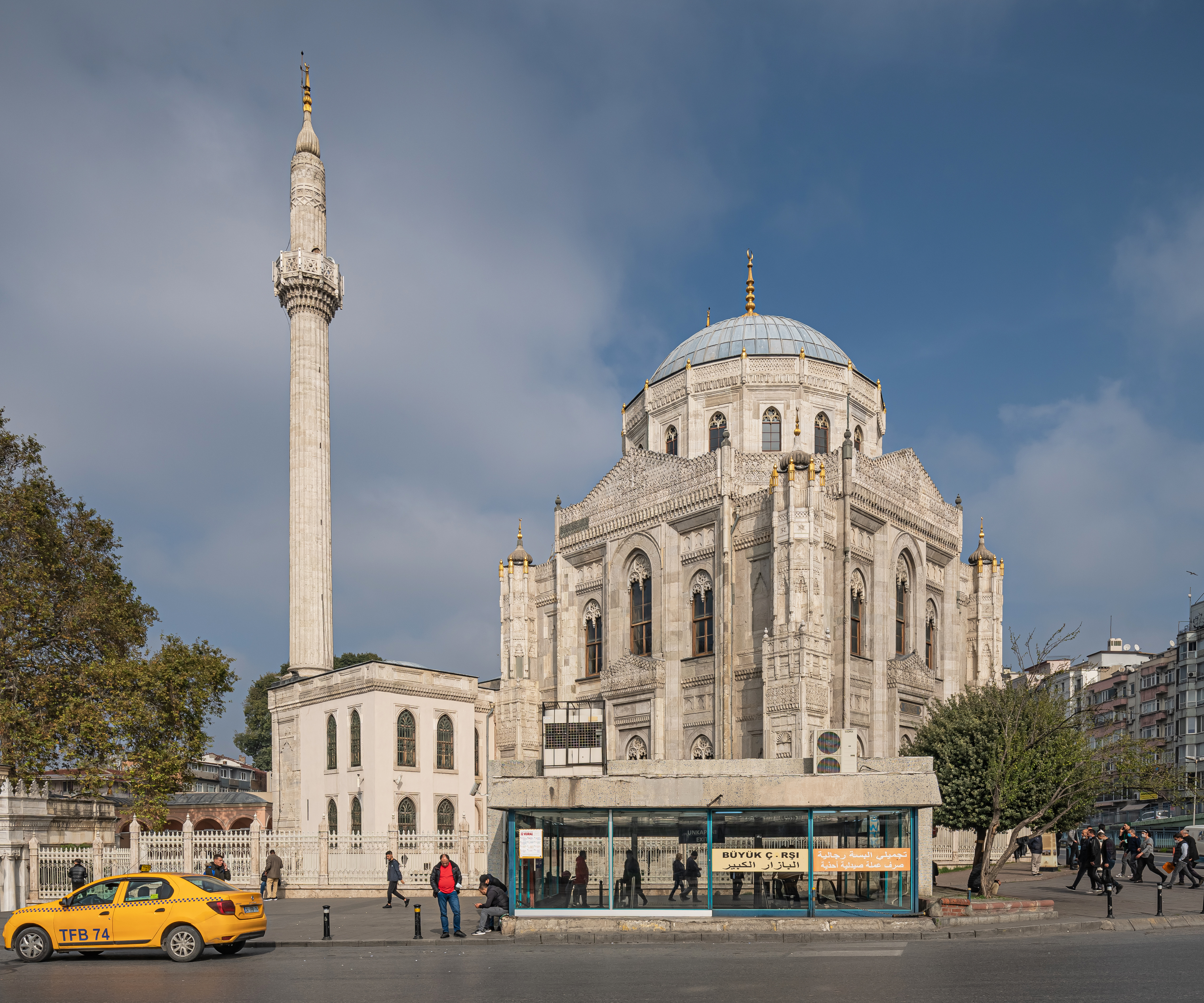

- Location within the Fatih district of Istanbul

Religion
- Affiliation: Islam

Location
- Location: Istanbul, Turkey
- Coordinates: 41°00′36″N 28°57′11″E

Architecture
- Type: Mosque
- Style: Ottoman, Gothic, Renaissance, Islamic
- Completed: 1872
- Minaret: 2

The Pertevniyal Valide Sultan Mosque, also known as the Aksaray Valide Mosque (Turkish: Pertevniyal Valide Sultan Camii, Aksaray Valide Sultan Camii), is a grand Ottoman imperial mosque in Istanbul, Turkey. It is located at the intersection of Ordu Street and Atatürk Boulevard in the Aksaray neighborhood beside the Pertevniyal High School (Turkish: Pertevniyal Lisesi) which was also built by the order of Sultana Pertevniyal in 1872. The mosque attracts 400-500 worshipers during regular prayer times and over 2,500 worshipers during Friday prayers.

The mosque's location was regarded as important to the Valide Sultan and royal family, as Aksaray was a vital commercial center during the Ottoman period. At the time what is now a busy pedestrian thoroughfare was known for its overwhelming beauty, with plentiful gardens and orchards.

== History ==
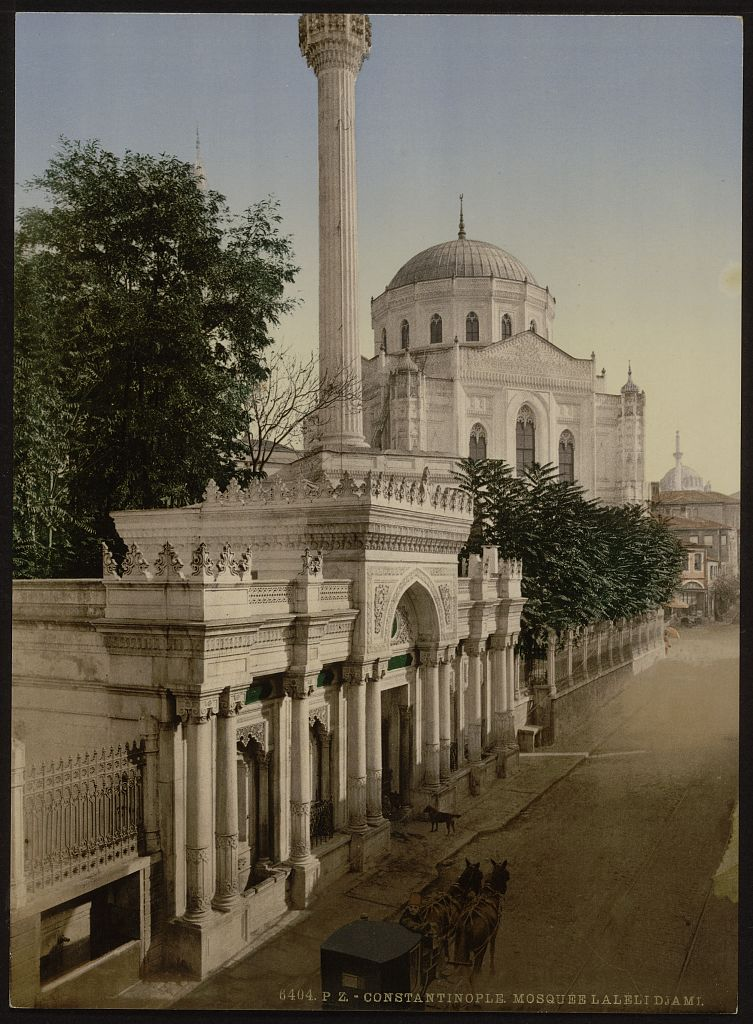
Pertevniyal Valide Sultan Mosque, Aksaray, Constantinople, Turkey. [between ca. 1890 and ca. 1900].

One of the last mosques built in Istanbul during the Ottoman Empire, the Pertevniyal Valide Sultan Mosque was created for Pertevniyal Sultan, a consort of Sultan Mahmud II and mother of Sultan Abdülaziz. It was probably designed by Sarkis Bey of the Ottoman Armenian Balyan family of architects. Construction began in November 1869, and the mosque was finished in 1871. An inscription above the gate leading to the courtyard gives the date. Other documents indicate that the foundations were created during different ceremonies in Sha'ban 1285/ November 1869. Pertevniyal Sultan died in 1883, thirteen years after the completion of the mosque, and was then buried within it.

The construction took three years to complete.

After numerous local roadworks, the mosque - approached via a grand gateway adorned with fountains - is now below the level of the surrounding streets.

The mosque was cleaned and restored in the 2010s.

== Architecture ==
The building is an example of Turkish Rococo with dollops of classical Ottoman, Moroccan, Gothic, Renaissance, and Empire styles. Some regarded the mishmash of styles as garish and short on classical Ottoman grandeur. The use of different elements shows the influence of the eclectic viewpoint common in the late Ottoman era. The design also seems to draw influences from Indian, North African, and Andalusian architecture.

=== Exterior ===
The mosque is the focal point of a complex that includes a tomb, sebil, fountain, time-keeper's room, library, and medrese.

The mosque itself follows the traditional plan with a square prayer-hall that measures 10 m x 10 m, and a single dome. This is separated from the walls and brought inward while being supported on a tall, 12-sided drum. Directly in front of the prayer hall is the portico where latecomers could pray and the sultan's loge. The mosque's east, west and south façades are all embedded with turrets and the outward-facing projections of their central sections are each capped with a triangular pediment. Each piece of the pediment has two rows with three windows as its featured design.

=== Interior ===
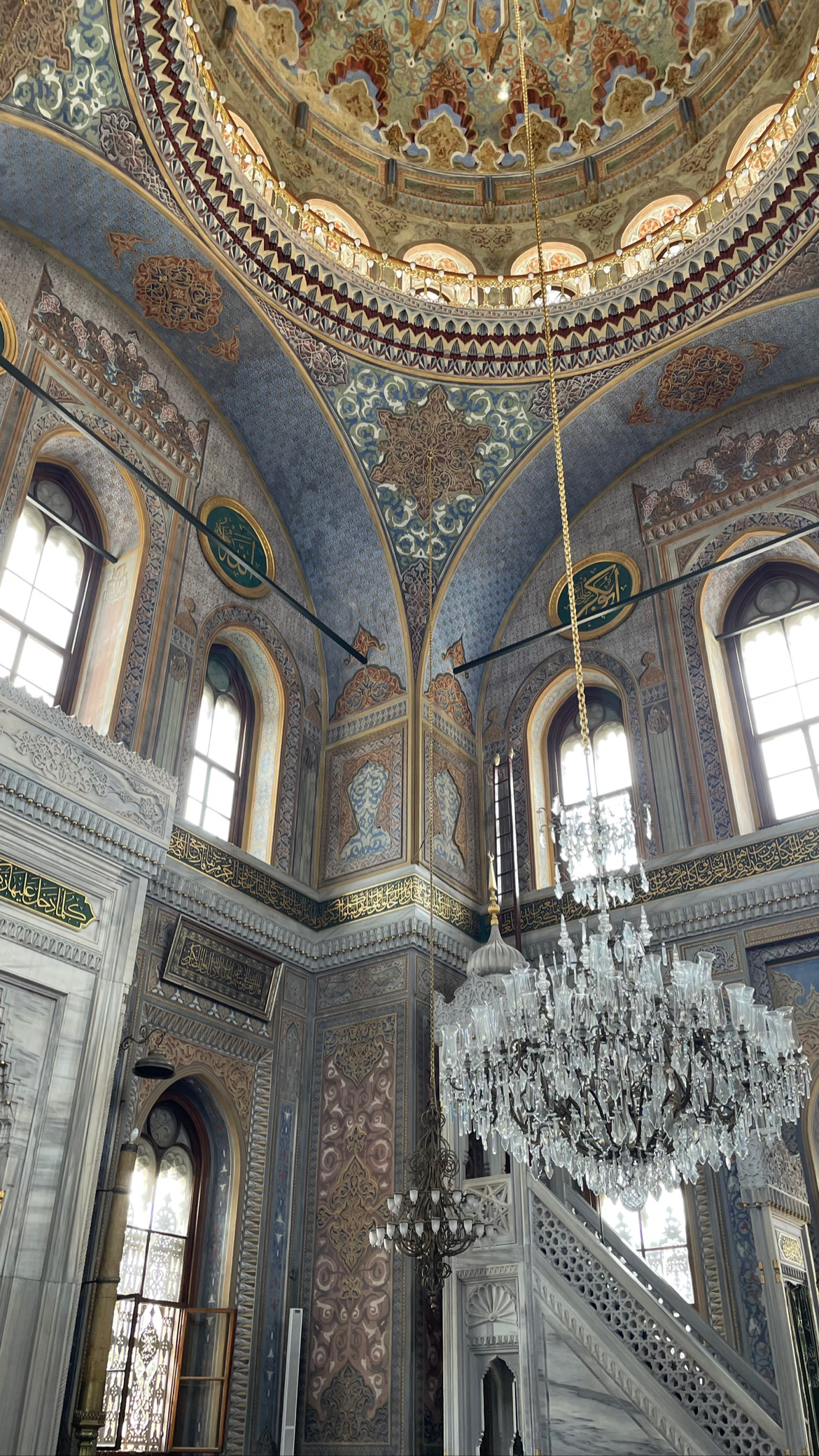
Interior of the Pertevniyal Valide Sultan Mosque

The interior is elaborately decorated with much use made of blue colouring. There are many classical Ottoman details on the walls including blind niches, muqarnas, arch motifs, arabesques, and Chinese-inspired floral arrangements. The interior also features a plain marble mihrab and minbar.

The tomb of Pertevniyal Sultan was located in the central mosque.

== Architect(s) ==
Some believe the mosque was designed by the Italian-Levantine architect Pietro Montani (1828-1887) while others believe it to have been created by Sarkis Balyan. Agop Balyan and Osep may also have had a hand in the design and construction of the mosque. The World Digital Library suggests it was designed by the Turkish Armenian architect Hakob Balyan.

== Modifications ==
In the year AH 1328/ AD 1911, the medrese of the Pertevniyal Valide Sultain Mosque complex burned down. The time-keeper's room, the sebil, and the tomb were removed during the renovation of Aksaray Square (1956–1959). Parts of the tomb were relocated to the graveyard beside the tomb of Sultan Selim III. Eventually the Valide Sultan's tomb was reconstructed from pieces of the original. Her body was relocated first to the Topkapı Palace, then to the tomb of Sultan Mahmud II, and finally to her own tomb. The mausoleum was eventually demolished in 1958.

== Mentions ==
A photo-chrome print of the Pertevniyal Valide Sultan Mosque is featured in the “Views of People and Sites in Turkey” from the catalog of the Detroit Publishing Company.

The Pertevniyal Valide Sultan Mosque is mentioned in The Architects of Ottoman Constantinople: The Balyan Family and the History of Ottoman Architecture by Alyson Wharton.

The mosque is mentioned in "RE-THINKING HISTORIOGRAPHY ON OTTOMAN MOSQUE ARCHITECTURE:NINETEENTH CENTURY PROVINCIAL SULTAN MOSQUES; A THESIS SUBMITTED TO THE GRADUATE SCHOOL OF SOCIAL SCIENCES OF MIDDLE EAST TECHNICAL UNIVERSITY" by Ceren Katipoğlu Özmen.

The mosque is featured in the Museum with No Frontiers.

== Gallery ==
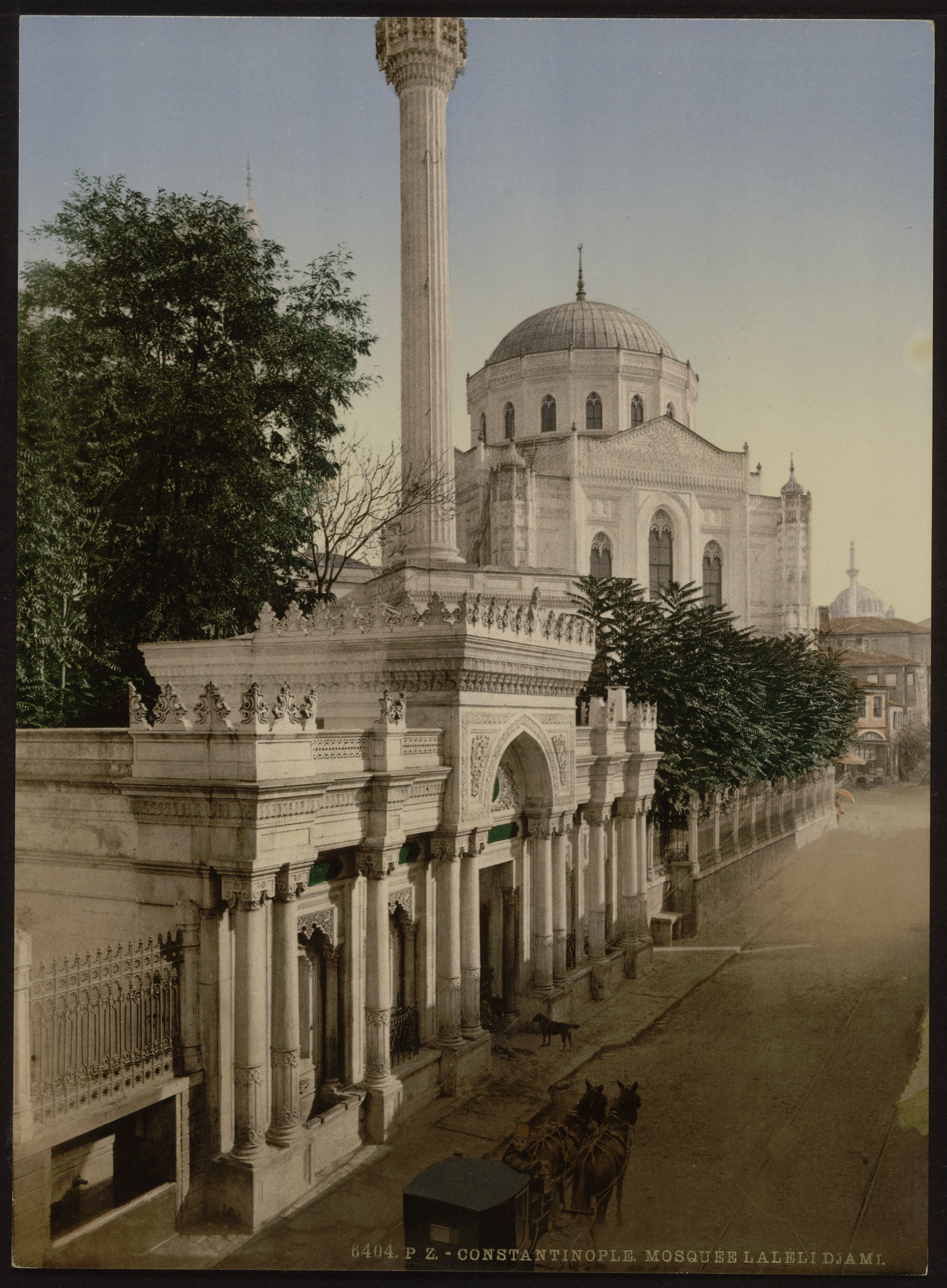
Pertevniyal Valide Sultan Mosque, around 1890-1900

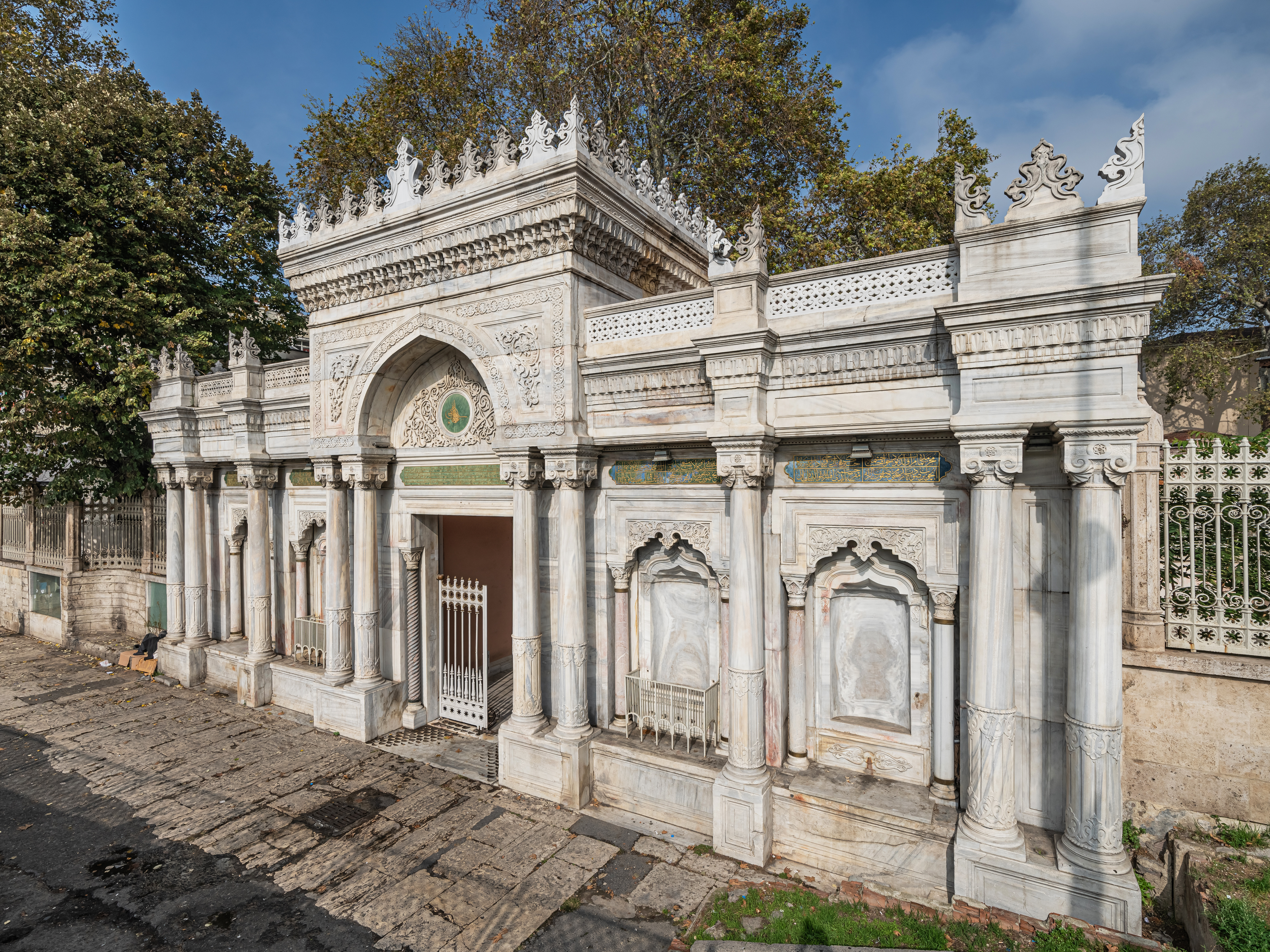
Entrance gate

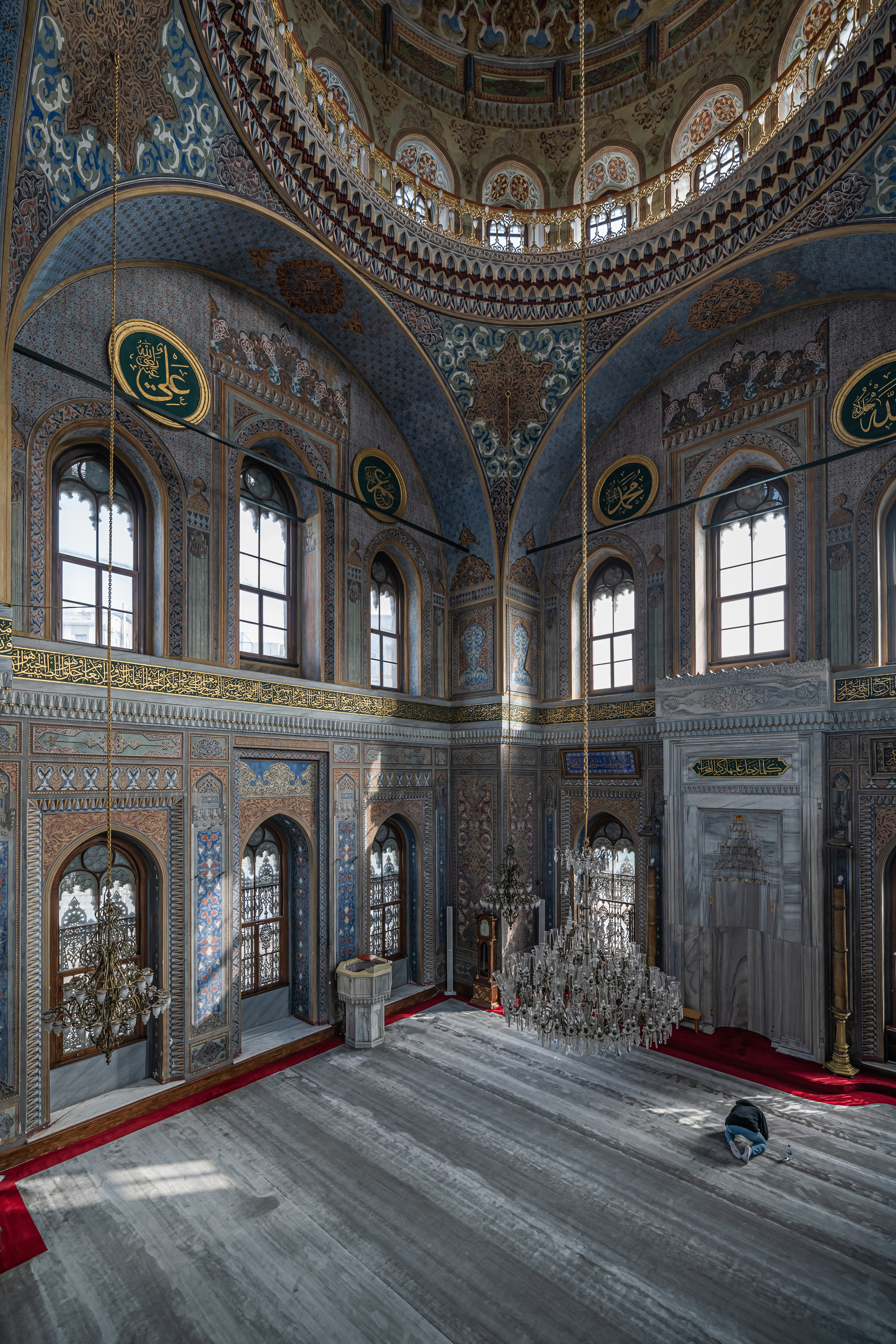
Interior view

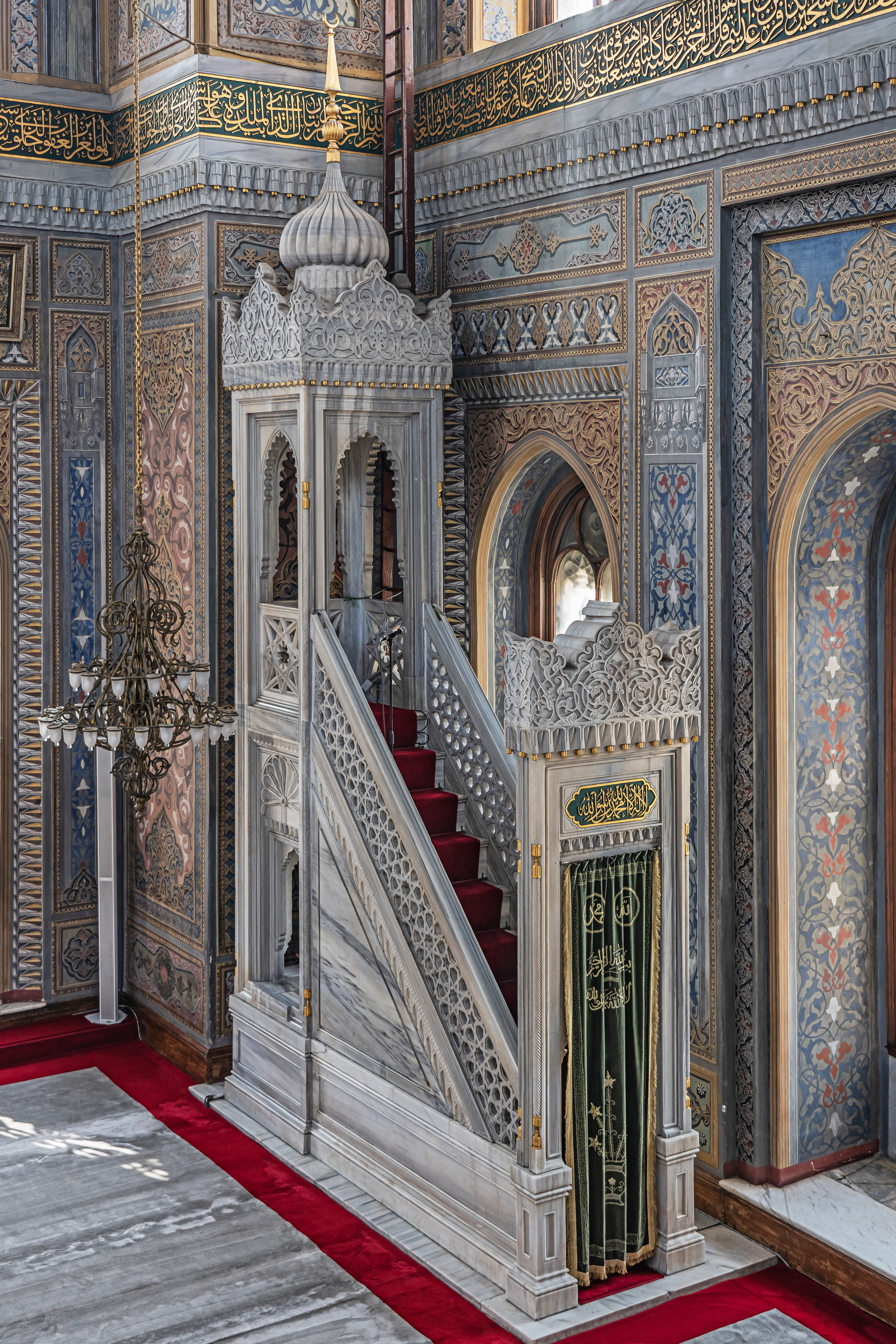
Minbar

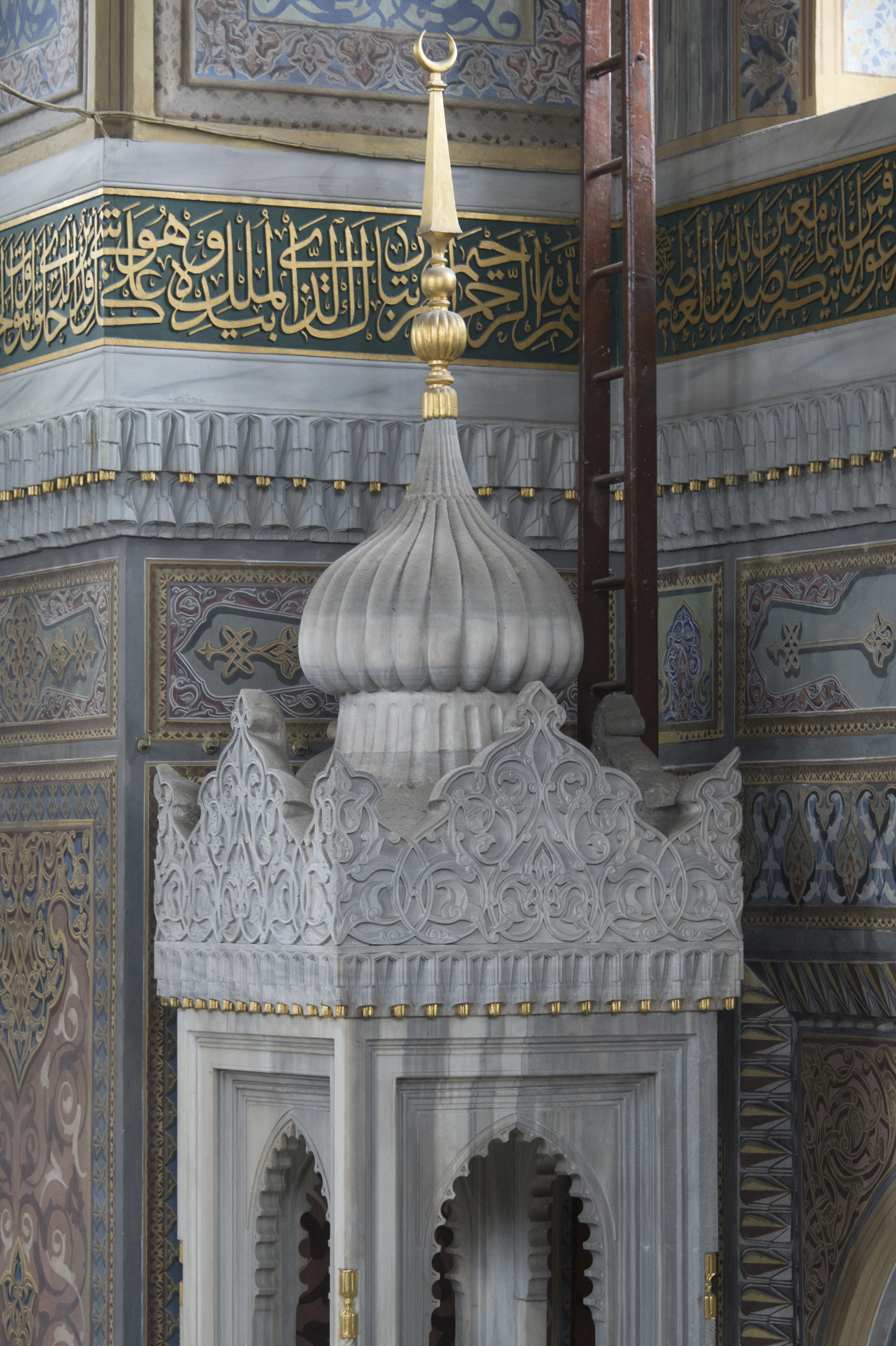
Top of minbar

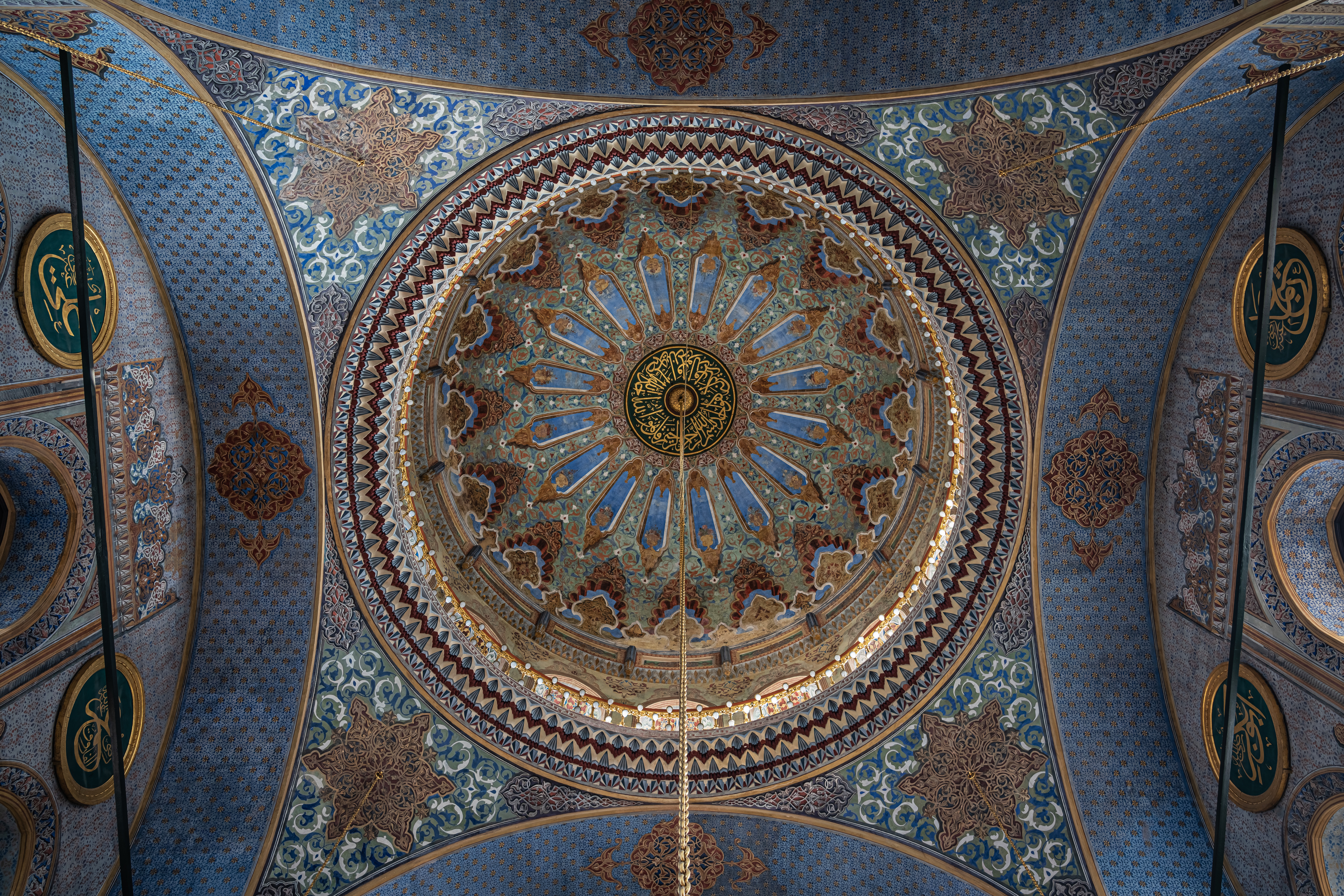
Dome interior

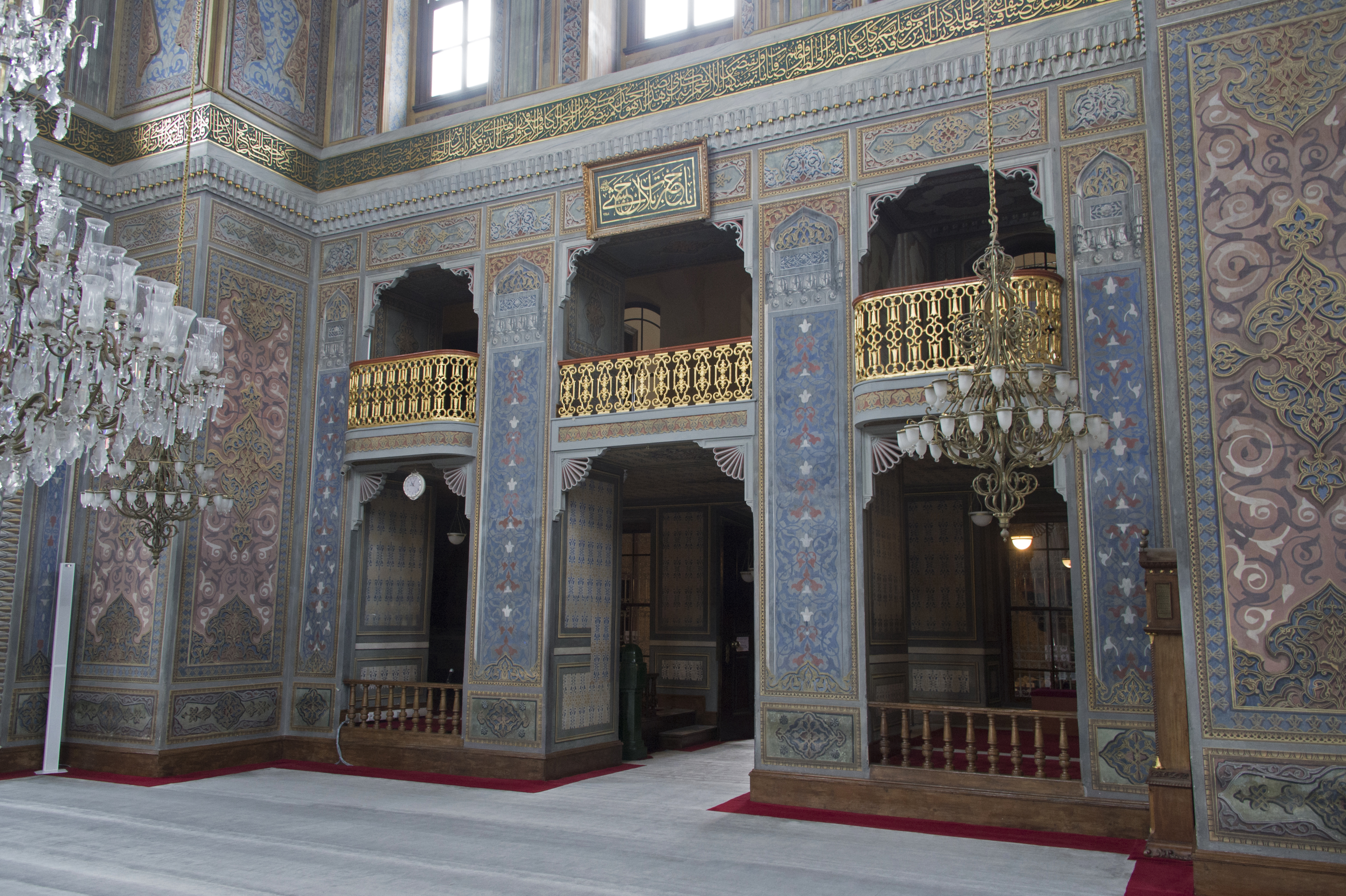
Interior towards entrance

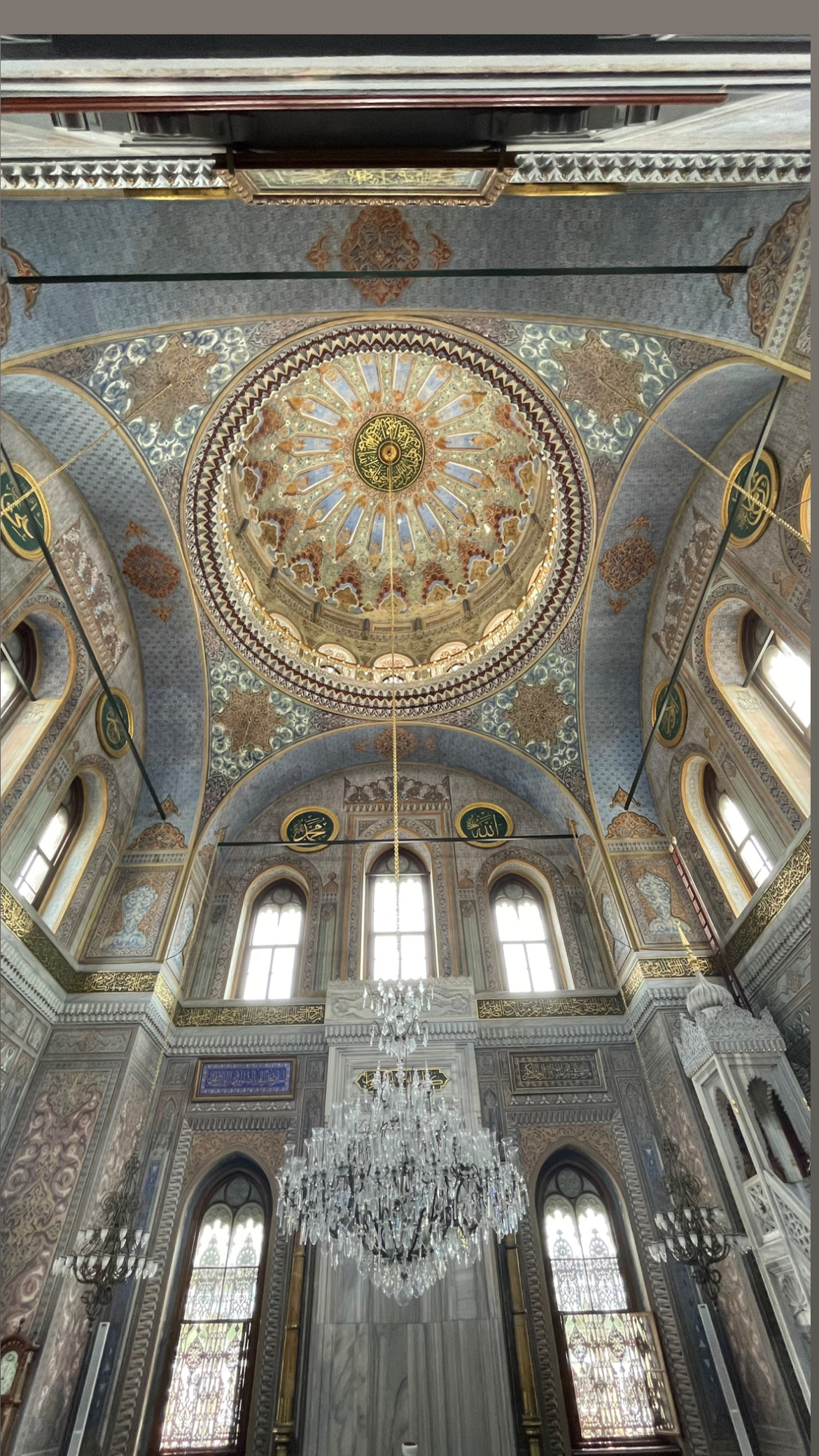
Dome Interior

== See also ==
- Ottoman architecture
- List of mosques
