= Metin Altıok =

Turkish poet (1941–1993)

Metin Altıok (March 14, 1941 – July 9, 1993) was a Turkish poet of Alevi faith, who - together with 34 other people, mostly Alevi intellectuals - fell victim to the 1993 Sivas massacre.

== Life ==
Metin Altıok was born in Bergama, İzmir Province, Turkey.

Metin Altıok studied philosophy at Ankara University. After graduating, he first worked as a civil servant and subsequently as a teacher.

He held teaching posts in various Anatolian cities, and taught for several years at the religious İmam Hatip school in the city of Bingöl.

Altıok published his first collection of poems, Gezgin ("Gadding about"), in 1976, which was followed two years later by Yerleşik yabancı ("Settled stranger") and eight additional collections until 1992. His works were awarded several literary prizes. In addition to his literary achievements, he drew with pen and charcoal.

On 2 July 1993, he was killed while attending a cultural festival in the central Turkish city of Sivas, when Islamist rioters set fire to the hotel in which the festival was held.

In 2003, the prominent Turkish composer Fazıl Say devoted an oratorio (Requiem for Metin Altıok) to Altıok, who was a friend of Say.

Since 2008, the Metin Altıok Poetry Award, listed by Cumhuriyet among Turkey's important literary awards, has been given in his memory by Kırmızı Kedi Publishing House.

== Bibliography ==
- Gezgin (1976)
- Yerleşik yabancı (1978)
- Kendinin avcısı (1979, Ahmet Telli ile 1980 Ömer Faruk Toprak Şiir Ödülü)
- Küçük tragedyalar (1981)
- İpek ve klabtan (1987)
- Gerçeğin öte yakası (1990, Cemal Süreya şiir ödülü)
- Dörtlükler ve desenler (1990)
- Süveyda (1991)
- Alaturka şiirler (1992)
- Şiirin ilk atlası (1992)
- Hesap işi şiirler (1993)
- Yel ve Gül (1993)
- Bir acıya kiracı (1998-Bütün Şiirleri)

== Literary awards ==
- 1979: Ahmet Telli Poetry Prize
- 1990: Cemal Süreya Poetry Prize
