= Haydar Ergülen =

Turkish poet (born 1956)

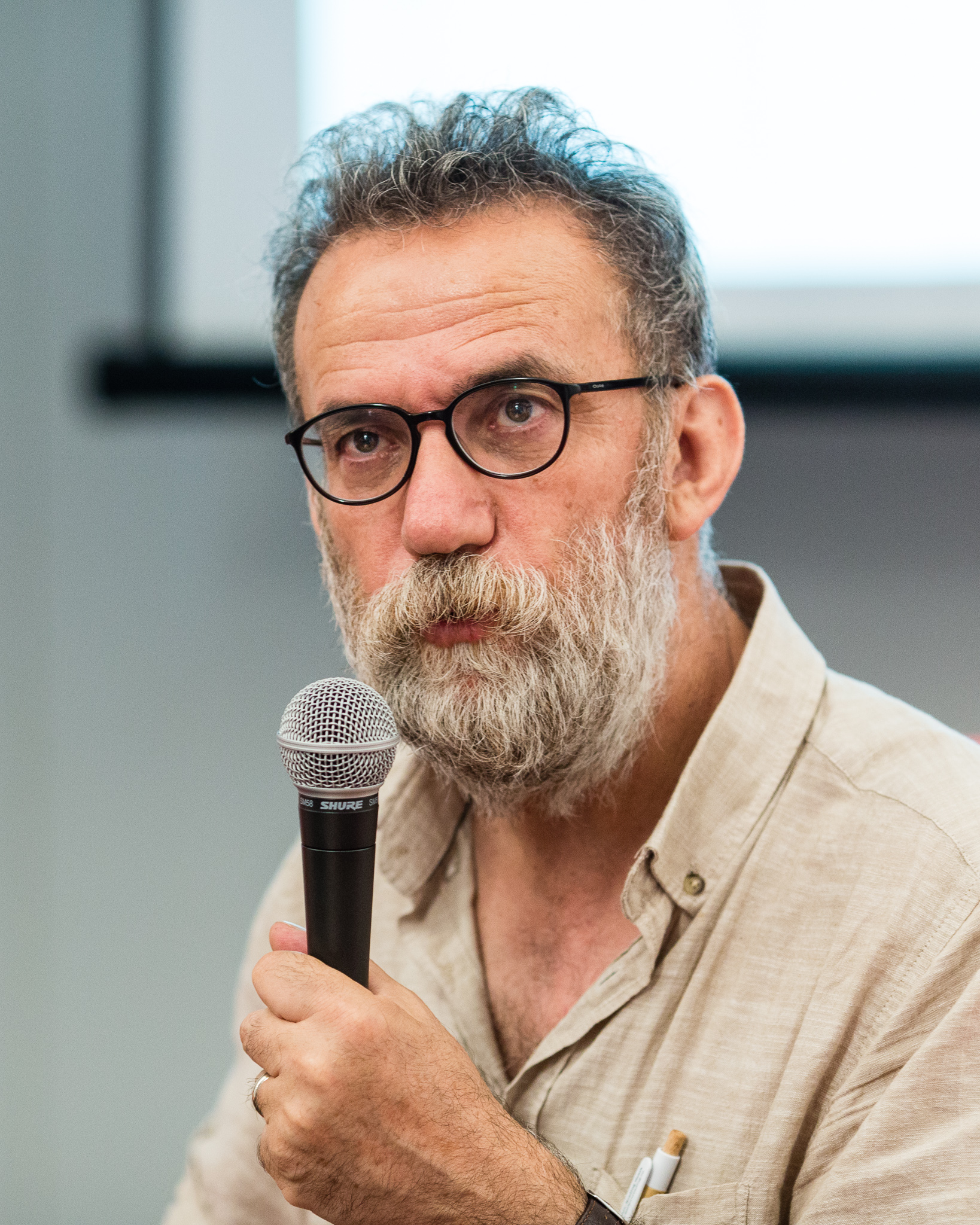
- Haydar Ergülen, 2018
- Born: 14 November 1956 (age 69); Eskişehir, Turkey
- Occupation: Poet

Haydar Ergülen (born 14 October 1956, in Eskişehir, Turkey) is a Turkish poet., he graduated from the Sociology Department at Orta Doğu Teknik Üniversitesi (Middle East Technical University) in Ankara.

After graduation from the university, he worked as an advertising copywriter. His first poetry book was published in 1981. As of 2020, his 17 poetry, 28 essay books have been published. Among his published poetry books are: Sokak Prensesi (Street Princess/1991), Eskiden Terzi (Once a Tailor), 40 Şiir ve Bir (40 Poems and One/1997), Karton Valiz (Cardboard Suitcase/1999).

With 40 Poems and One, Ergülen won the 1997 "Behçet Necatigil Poetry Award" as well as the "Orhon Murat Arıburnu Poetry Award". His "Once a Tailor" brought him the 1996 "Halil Kocagöz Poetry Award".

For some of his books, he used the pen name "Hafız".

== Published books in foreign languages ==
Haydar Ergülen's poems have been translated to various languages and published as books, in addition, inclusion in various other publications like anthologies etc.

His published books in foreign countries are:

- France:Carnet Intime (AL MANAR Editions, 2012) and Grenade ou Nar (L’Harmattan, 2015).
- Germany:Die Ecken deiner Stille(Elif Verlag, 2019)
- United Kingdom:Pomegranate Garden (Parthian Books, 2019)
- Italy: La Casa Nella Melegrana (Valigierosse, 2020).

== Other related activities ==
Haydar Ergülen is the director of the International Eskişehir Poetry Festival, International Nazım Hikmet Poetry Days, and İzmir International literature Festival. He gives lectures at universities on creative writing, poetry, Turkish Literature and philosophy. He organizes workshops on creative writing and poetry. He is the member of board PEN International in Turkey.
