= Aksaray, Fatih =

Aksaray
- Neighbourhood
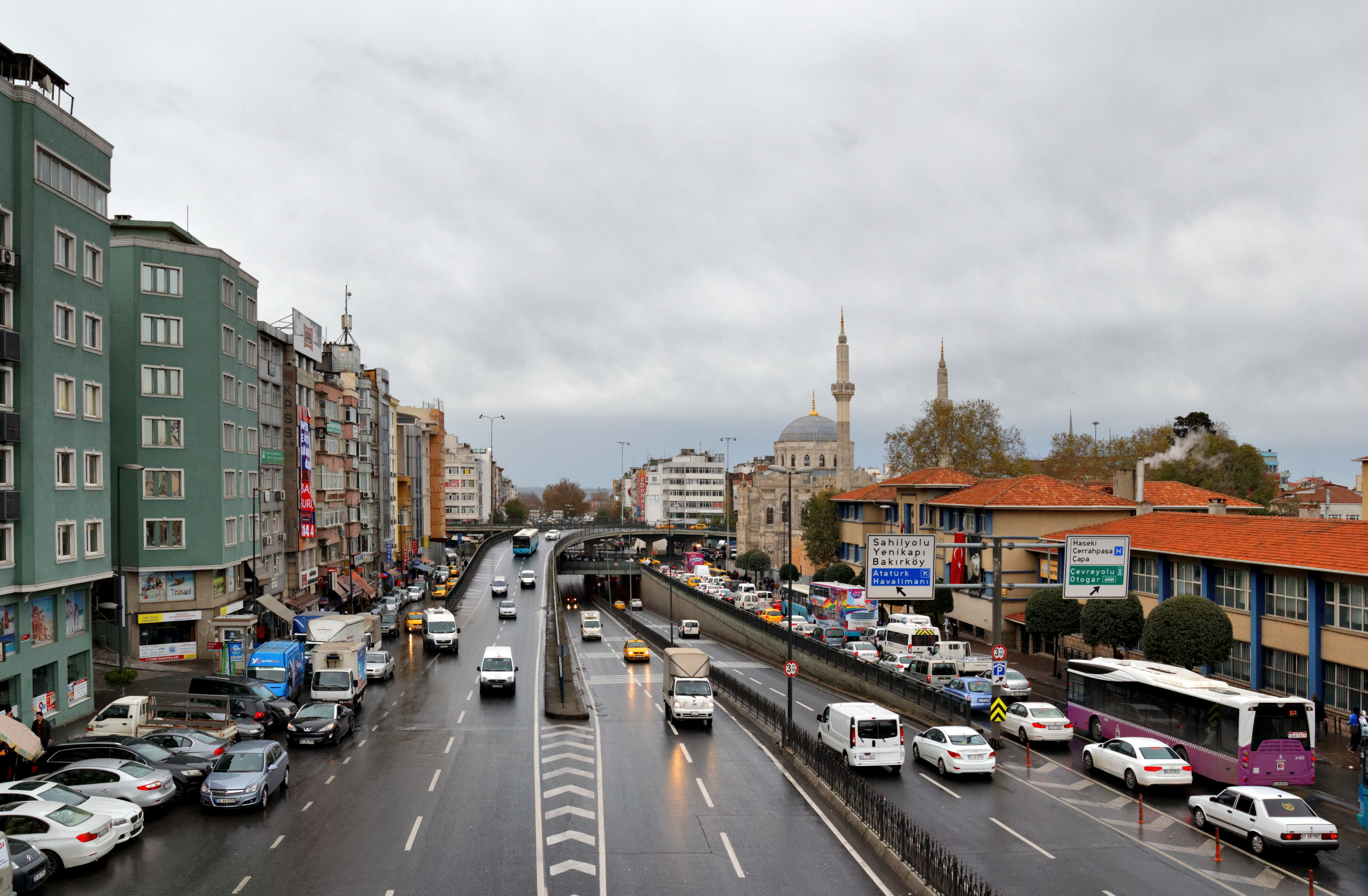

- Location within Turkey Location within Istanbul
- Coordinates: 41°00′36″N 28°57′10″E
- Country: Turkey
- Province: Istanbul
- District: Fatih
- Population (2022): 8,541
- Time zone: UTC+3 (TRT)
- Postal code: 34096
- Area code: 0212

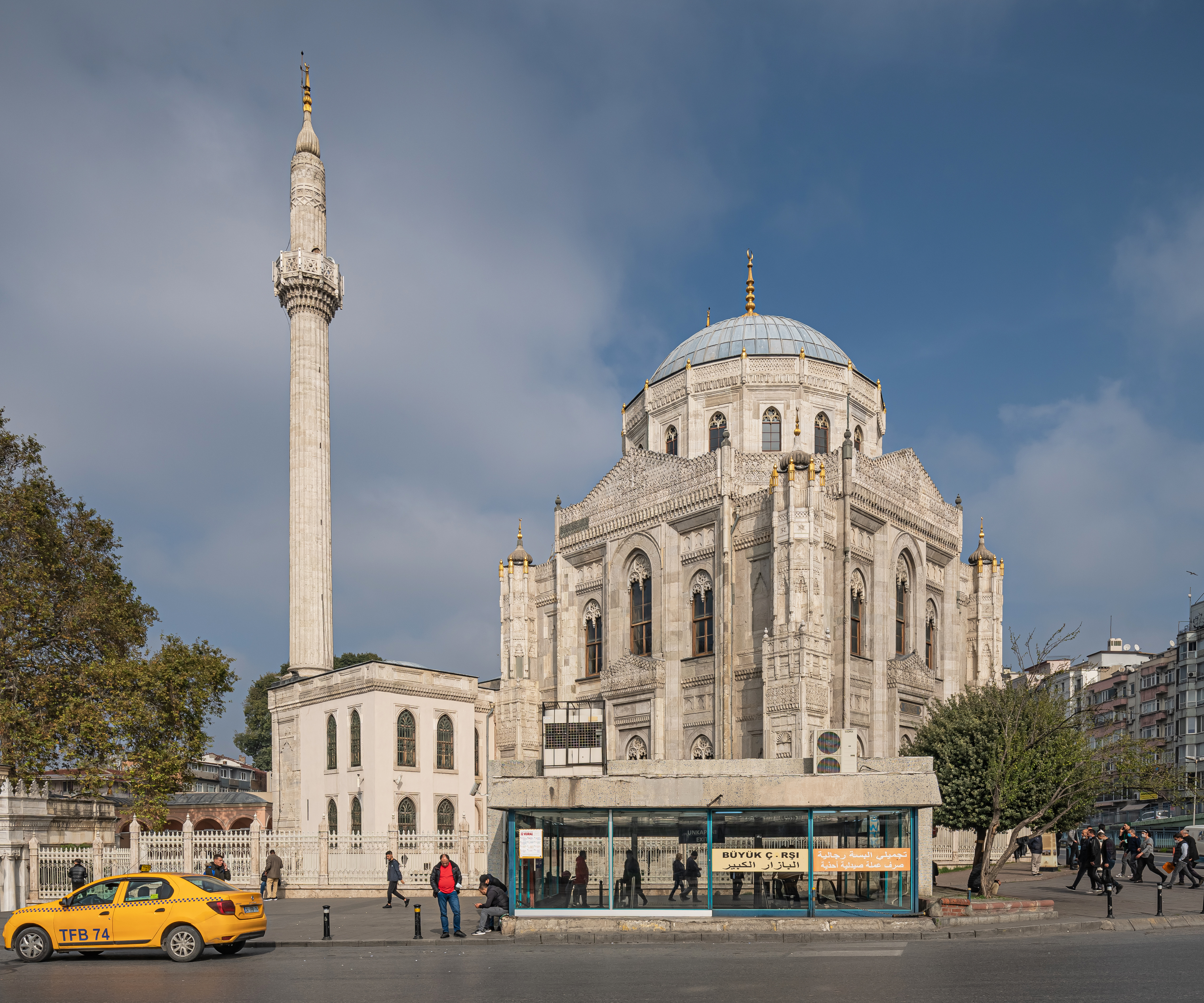
Pertevniyal Valide Sultan Mosque in Aksaray.

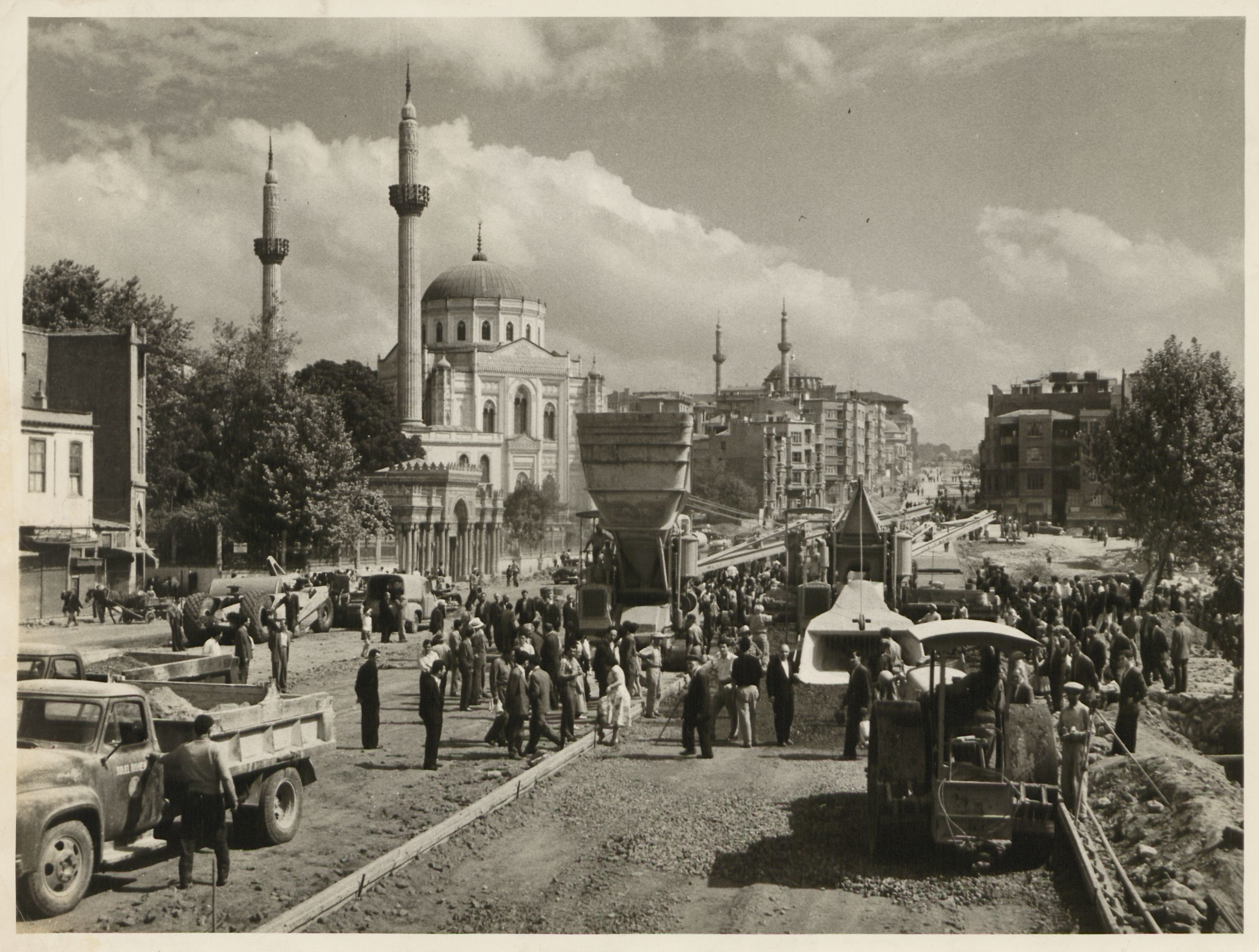
A photograph showing road construction work carried out in Aksaray in the 1950s.

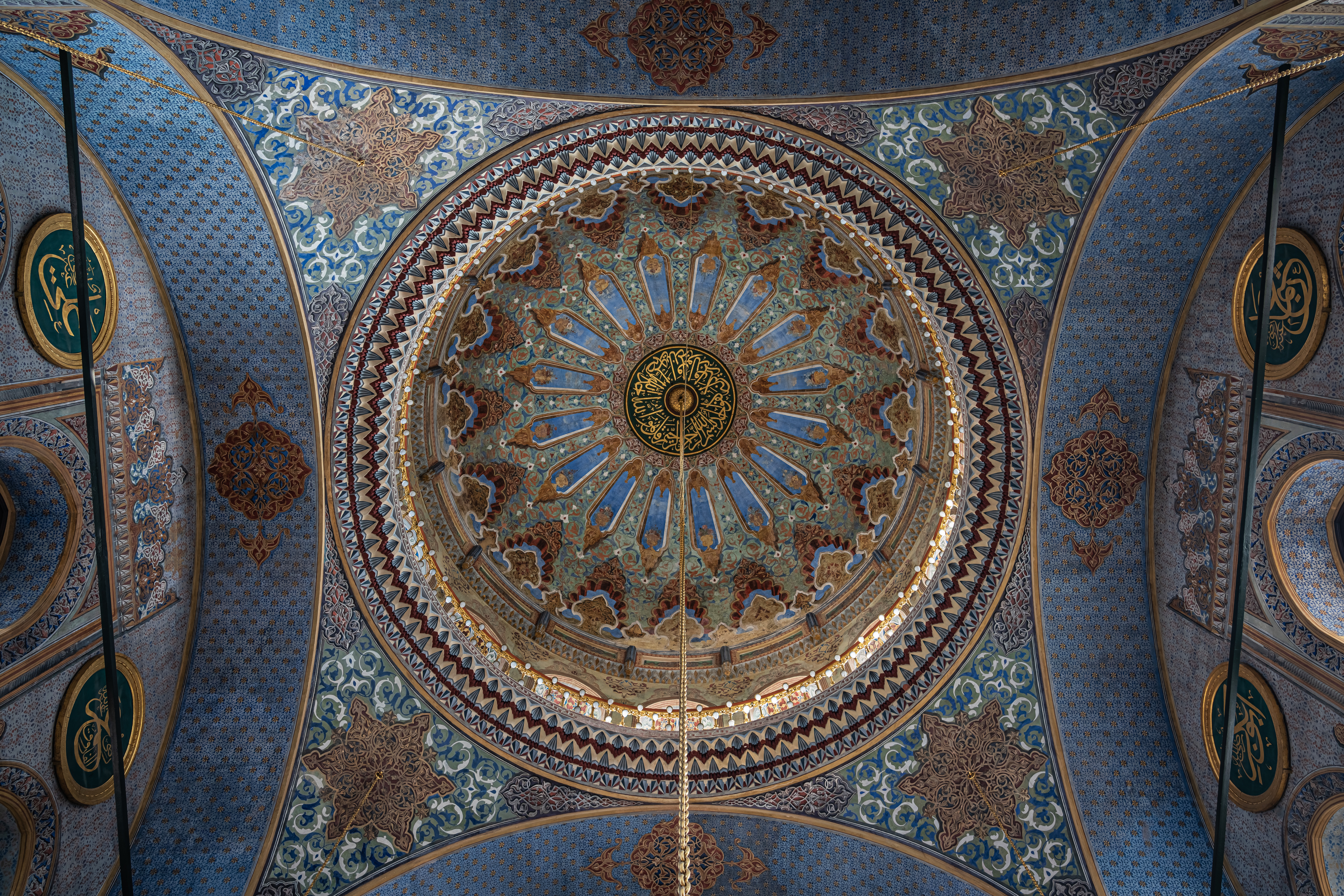
Interior of Pertevniyal Valide Sultan Mosque.

Aksaray (literally "White Palace" in Turkish) is a neighbourhood in the municipality and district of Fatih, Istanbul Province, Turkey. Its population is 8,541 (2022). It is so named because it was founded by migrants from Aksaray in central Turkey, brought here in the 15th century by Mehmet II to repopulate the city after its conquest.

Aksaray is a mainly modern neighbourhood centred on a busy square. It was historically known as Bóos, (Latin: Forum Bovis, Greek: ὁ Bοῦς, romanized: o Bous), It has a large population of migrants from the southeast of the country and many restaurants serve the cuisine of Şanlıurfa, Diyarbakır and Hatay. More recently it has also acquired a large population of Syrian refugees who have introduced their own cuisine to the mix. There are many shops and hotels here.

To the east, Aksaray borders the textile-retailing neighbourhood of Laleli while to the west, along Millet Caddesi, lies Çapa. To the south is Yenikapı and to the north Fatih. Busy Vatan Caddesi (AKA Adnan Menderes Bulvarı) runs northwest from Aksaray towards the City Walls, following the route of the lost Lycos river.

== Attractions ==
The Pertevniyal Valide Sultan Mosque stands by the busy road junction near Aksaray tram stop. Squeezed in between Aksaray and Yusufpaşa is the smaller, older and much less conspicuous Murad Pasha Mosque, built in 1473 in the early Ottoman architectural style perfected in Bursa.

On Aksaray Square the wooden Hindiler (Horhor) Tekkesi has been rebuilt behind an austere stone fountain. The small Camcılar (Glaziers) Mosque is also being rebuilt on the edge of the square.

A little way along Vatan Caddesi stands the Fenari İsa Mosque which started life as the early 10th-century Byzantine Church of Constantine Lips. Facing it across the road is the Yavuz Sultan Selim Medrese, a work of Mimar Sinan dating from 1549 now used as a clinic. Nearby is the tomb of one of Sultan Selim I's daughters, Şah-ı Huban, partially hidden by a stone schoolhouse. It, too, was designed by Mimar Sinan.

== Transport ==
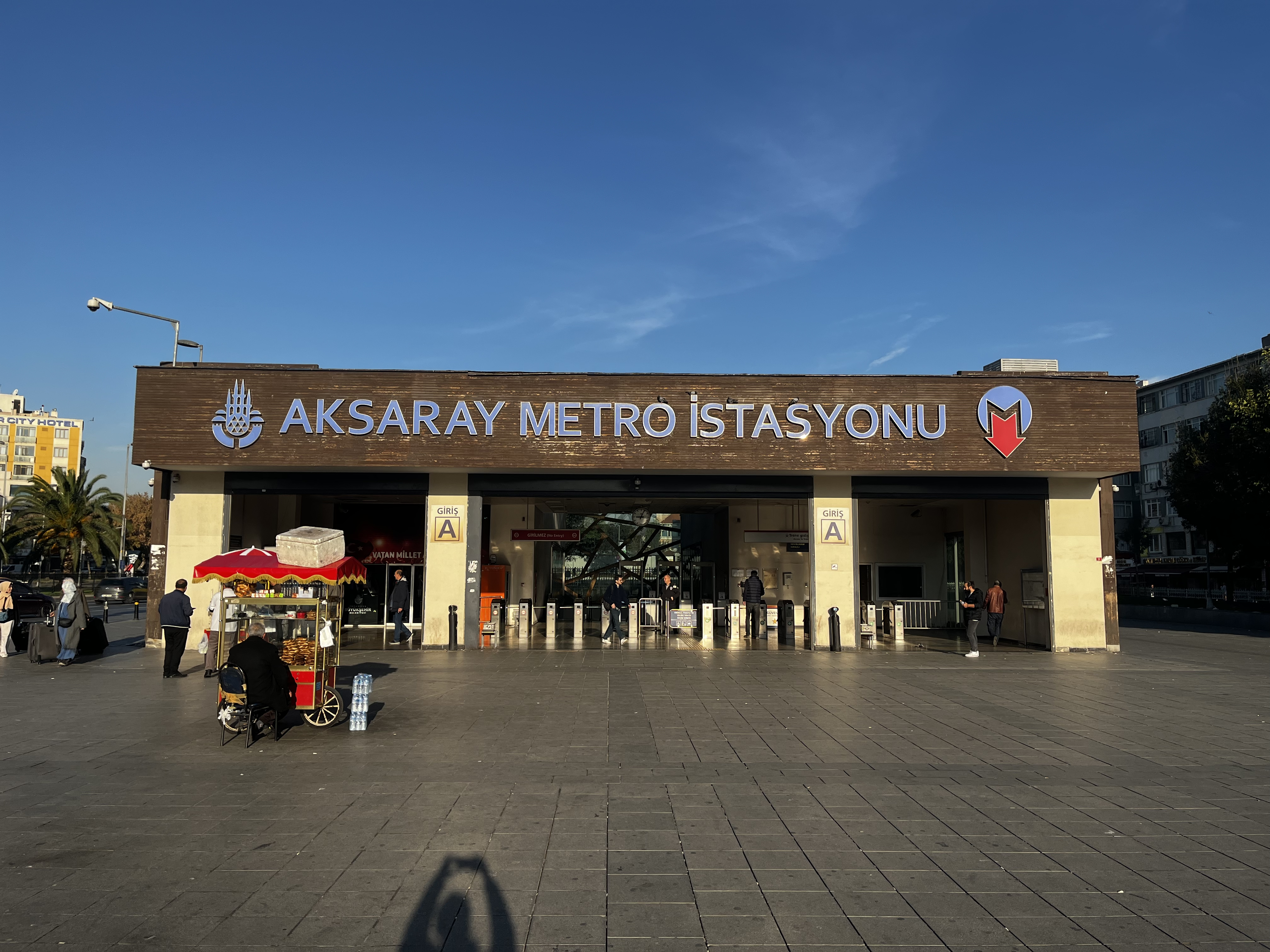
Aksaray Metro Station

Aksaray is the starting point for the M1 line which runs to the Atatürk International Airport, now no longer in use for passenger aircraft. The Otogar stop on the line serves the large inter-city bus terminus at Esenler.

Aksaray is also served by the T1 tram line.

== Hub for sex trafficking ==
Aksaray is said to be a hub for the sex trafficking of young women from Romania, Moldova and Ukraine. Some reports in the Turkish media have claimed that the neighbourhood is especially prone to prostitution because it is a "no man's land" between two adjoining police jurisdictions, Fatih and Eminönü.

== Sources ==
- Mamboury, Ernest (1953). The Tourists' Istanbul. Istanbul: Çituri Biraderler Basımevi.
