= Dəmirçi =

Dəmirçi or Damirchi or Demirchi or Damerchi may refer to:

- Dəmirçi, Masally, Azerbaijan
- Dəmirçi, Nakhchivan, Azerbaijan
- Dəmirçi, Shamakhi, Azerbaijan
- Damirchi-ye Kharabahsi, Ardabil Province, Iran
- Damirchi-ye Olya, Ardabil Province, Iran
- Damirchi-ye Sofla, Ardabil Province, Iran
- Damirchi, Hashtrud, East Azerbaijan Province, Iran
- Damirchi, Malekan, East Azerbaijan Province, Iran
- Damirchi, Meyaneh, East Azerbaijan Province, Iran
- Damirchi, Sarab, East Azerbaijan Province, Iran
- Damirchi Haddadan, East Azerbaijan Province, Iran
- Damirchi, Markazi, Iran
- Damirchi, Naqadeh, West Azerbaijan Province, Iran
- Damirchi, Shahin Dezh, West Azerbaijan Province, Iran
- Demirci, Manisa Province, Turkey

== See also ==
- Demirci (disambiguation)
- Dəmirçilər (disambiguation)
- Demirciler (disambiguation)
