= Demirchilar (carpet) =

Azerbaijani carpet

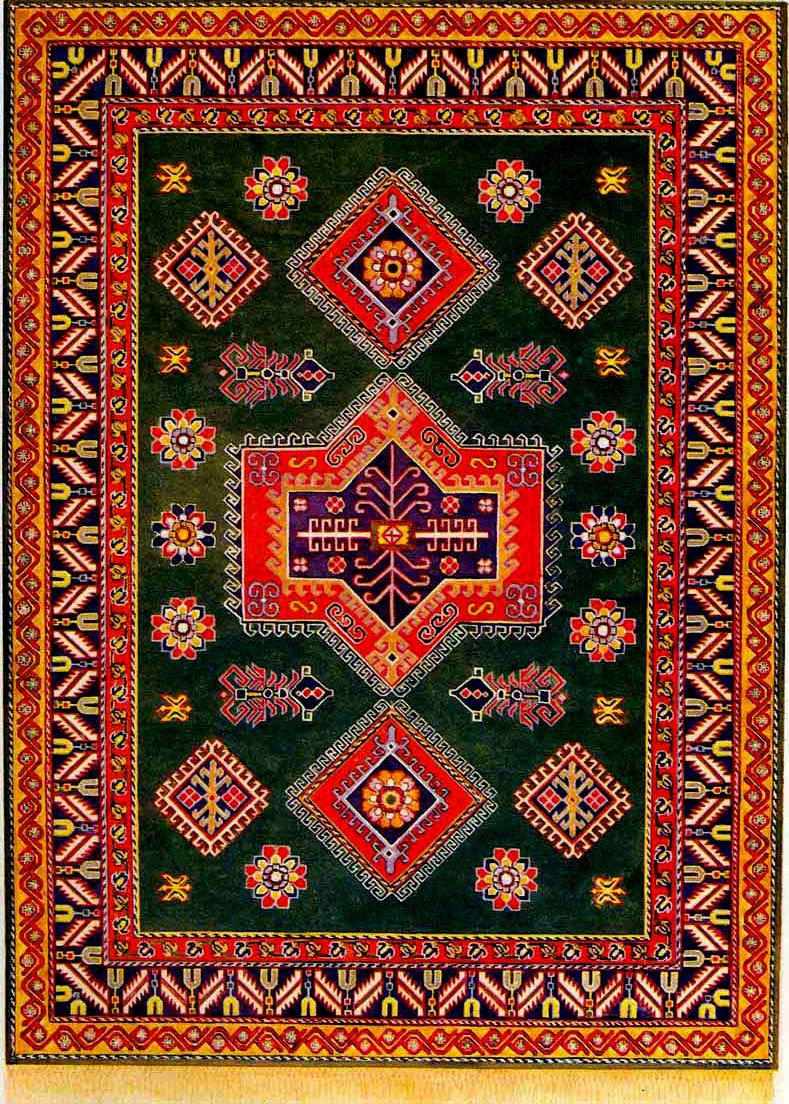
"Demirchilar" Carpet (19th century). Azerbaijan Carpet Museum, Baku

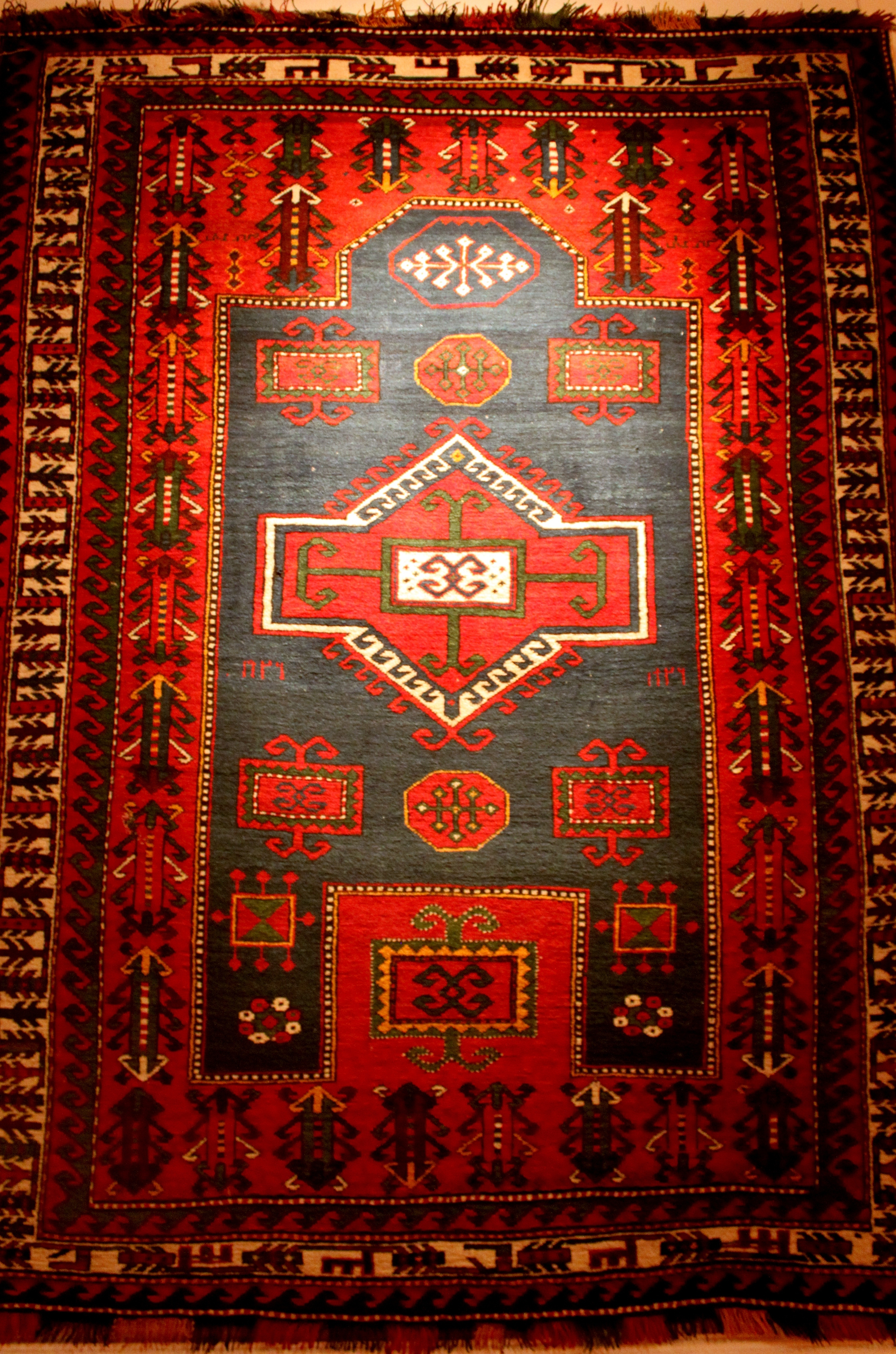
The Namazlik carpet "Demirchilar" (19th century). National Art Museum of Azerbaijan, Baku

"Demirchilar" (Azerbaijani: Dəmirçilər) - Azerbaijani carpets belonging to the Gazakh group of the Ganja-Gazakh type. The name of this carpet is associated with the name of the village of Demirchilar located 9 kilometres west of the city of Gazakh in Azerbaijan. Some carpet experts call this carpet "Demirchi Hasan". This carpet is also produced in the villages of Dash Salakhli, Kosalar, and Urkmazli from the Gazakh district. Demirchilar carpets are considered to be of the highest category carpets in the Gazakh group.

== Artistic features ==
The carpets known as "Demirchilar" have different structures. There are three main versions for this type of rug.

=== First version ===
The composition of the middle field of the carpets of the first version consists of polygonal gels. The composition is based on these gels which are built one after the other. The number of gels in the middle field is determined by the length of the carpet. In small carpets 2-3 gels are placed, in the elongated gyabas - there are more. The middle border known as "Surmadan" is characteristic for the "Demirchilar" carpets as a border strip.

=== Second version ===
The second version is made up of the carpets called by the carpet weavers the "Demirchi Hasan". These carpets mainly consist of namazlik rugs with tag-arch or mehrab. If earlier these carpets had a religious purpose, in particular, they were made for performing the namaz, then over time they became only a decorative item. The composition "Namazlyk" of the "Demirchilar" carpet is more original than that of other "Namazlyk" rugs. On its upper part, there is a geometrical tag for "mohur". A thin border - medakhil, which surrounds the middle field and forms a tag in the upper part of the carpet, closes in the lower part of the middle field into a square intended for the feet of the praying person. So, when praying, when performing the namaz, one must touch the ground with seven parts of their body - the forehead, hands, knees and thumbs. Thus, if they place their feet on a square-shaped "gedemgah" located in the lower part of the middle field, then their knees and hands should be on the gel, placed above the centre of the middle field, and their forehead will touch the mohura, which is located in the centre of the tag and is called"sajdagah". The craftsmen who weaved Namazlyk carpets in the old days, observing the rituals of the prayer, had to calculate in advance the distance between the “gademgah” - the place for feet and “sajdagah” - the place for mokhur (for more details, see the article “Namazlyk”).

=== Third version ===
It is made up of the carpets called “Mehrabsiz”, which means “without mehrab”. They are characterized by keto-like gels, located one after the other, starting from the lower part of the middle field to its end. Recently, large size carpets have been produced with one gel placed in the centre of their middle field.

== Technical features ==
The Demirchilar carpets are often woven in small sizes. Sometimes there are large carpets, in rare cases - there are elongated. The density of knots: on each square decimetre is from 26 × 26 to 30 × 30 knots (on each square meter - from 60 000 to 90 000). The pile height is from 8 to 12 millimetres.

== See also ==
- Azerbaijani rug
- Karabakh carpet
