= Dəmirçilər =

Dəmirçilər may refer to:

- Dəmirçilər, Khojaly, Azerbaijan
- Dəmirçilər, Qazax, Azerbaijan
- Dəmirçilər, Qubadli, Azerbaijan
- Dəmirçilər, Tartar, Azerbaijan

== See also ==
- Demirciler (disambiguation)
- Dəmirçi (disambiguation)
- Demirci (disambiguation)
