= Demirci (surname) =

Demirci (Turkish pronunciation: [demiɾdʒi]) is a Turkish surname meaning "blacksmith". Notable people with the surname include:

- İsmail Demirci (born 1984), Turkish actor
- Muhammed Demirci (born 1995), Turkish footballer
- Tan Tolga Demirci (born 1974), Turkish director and writer
- Utkan Demirci (born c. 1977), Turkish scientist

== See also ==
- Demirci (disambiguation)
