= Demirci (disambiguation) =

Demirci is a town and district of Manisa Province, Turkey.

Demirci (Turkish: "blacksmith") may refer to:

== People ==
- Demirci (surname)
- Demirdjian (surname)

== Places ==
- Demirci, Ayvacık
- Demirci, Çubuk, a village in the district of Çubuk, Ankara Province, Turkey
- Demirci, Gülağaç, a village in the district of Gülağaç, Aksaray Province, Turkey
- Demirci, Hınıs
- Demirci, Kovancılar
- Demirci, Kurucaşile, a village in the district of Kurucaşile, Bartın Province, Turkey
- Demirci, Nilüfer
- Demirci, Orhaneli
- Demirci, Şavşat, a village in the district of Şavşat, Artvin Province, Turkey

== See also ==
- Dəmirçi (disambiguation)
- Demirciler (disambiguation)
- Dəmirçilər (disambiguation)
