= Hitler's reference to the Armenian genocide =

Alleged reference to the Armenian genocide made by Adolf Hitler

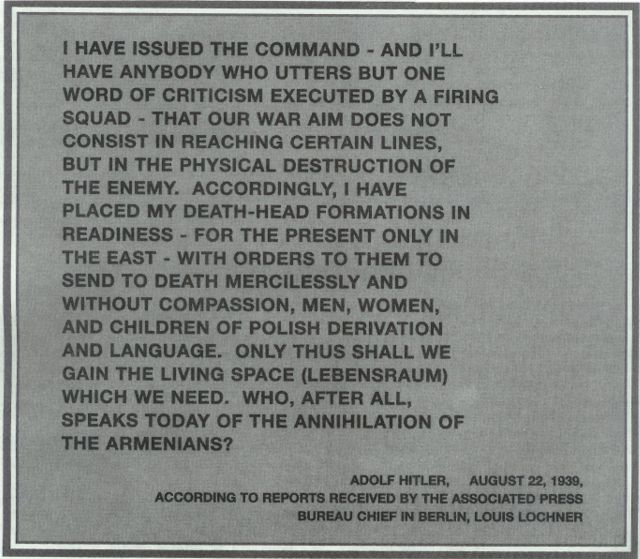
Quote by Adolf Hitler referencing the Armenian Genocide, displayed at the Holocaust Museum in Washington, D.C.

At the conclusion of his Obersalzberg Speech on 22 August 1939, a week before the German invasion of Poland, Nazi leader Adolf Hitler reportedly said "Who, after all, speaks today of the annihilation of the Armenians?" (German: Wer redet heute noch von der Vernichtung der Armenier?).

== Background ==
The Armenian genocide was the systematic murder of around 600,000 to 1.5 million ethnic Armenians in the Ottoman Empire during World War I. Germany was an ally of the Ottomans at the time and sent a large contingent of officers and soldiers to the Middle Eastern Theater. They would send back several reports about the massacres perpetrated against Armenians, but the news was largely censored and even denied by German government and press.

Abram L. Sachar, an American historian and founding president of Brandeis University, wrote that "the genocide was cited approvingly twenty-five years later by the Fuehrer... who found the Armenian 'solution' an instructive precedent". According to historian Stefan Ihrig, there is considerable evidence that the Nazi worldview was shaped by the Turkish Revolution and the lack of prosecution of Ottoman war criminals who committed the Armenian Genocide. During this same speech Hitler called the inhabitants of “East Asia and Arabia” derogatory terms and said they desired to be “flogged”, and mocked Turkey: “The little States cannot scare me. After Kemal’s death Turkey is governed by ‘cretins’ and half idiots.”

== Speech ==
In his Obersalzberg speech, Hitler states:

Our strength lies in our quickness and in our brutality; Genghis Khan has sent millions of women and children into death knowingly and with a light heart. History sees in him only the great founder of States. As to what a weak Western European civilisation asserts about me, that is of no account. I have given the command and I shall shoot everyone who utters one word of criticism, for the goal to be obtained in the war is not that of reaching certain lines but of physically demolishing the opponent. And so for the present only in the East I have put my death-head formations' in place with the command relentlessly and without compassion to send into death many women and children of Polish origin and language. Only thus we can gain the living space (lebensraum) that we need. Who after all is today speaking about the destruction of the Armenians?

== Nuremberg trial ==
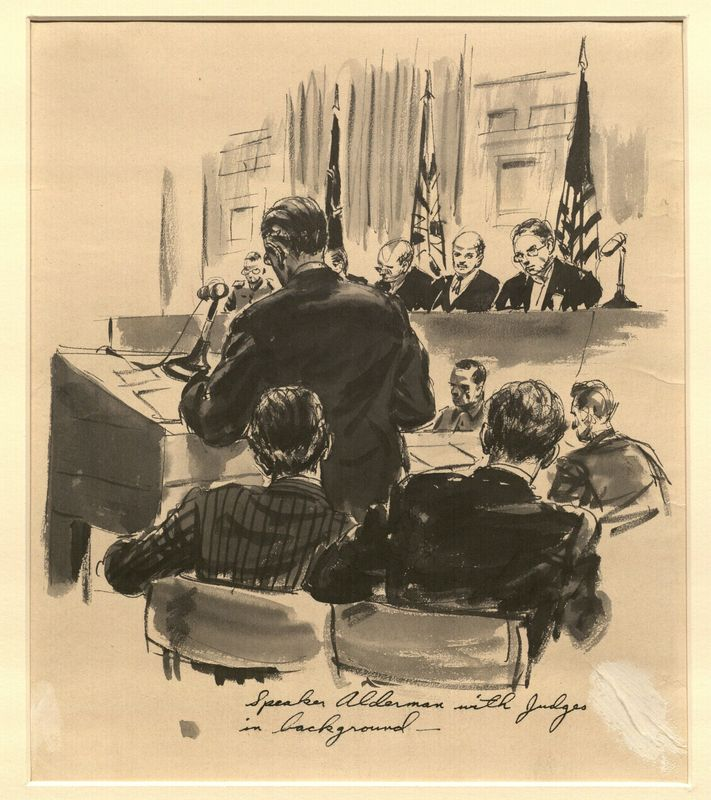
Courtroom portrait of Sidney Alderman at the Nuremberg trial

The Nuremberg War Crimes Tribunal obtained the first notes from the speech by Louis Lochner, a journalist who had been based at the Berlin bureau of the Associated Press during the war. The document was labelled "L-3", and was one of three documents purporting to record the words spoken by Hitler in the Obersalzberg speech. After the defence counsel of Grand Admiral Erich Raeder objected, that version was not admitted into evidence. In explaining its decision to the president of the court on 26 November 1945, Prosecutor Sidney Alderman stated:

The first of the three documents came into our possession through the medium of an American newspaperman, and purported to be original minutes of this meeting at Obersalzberg, transmitted to this American newspaperman by some other person; and we had no proof of the actual delivery to the intermediary by the person who took the notes. That document, therefore, merely served to keep our prosecution on the alert, to see if it could find something better. Fortunately, we did get the other two documents, which indicate that Hitler on that day made two speeches, perhaps one in the morning, one in the afternoon, as indicated by the original minutes, which we captured. By comparison of those two documents with the first document, we conclude that the first document was a slightly garbled merger of the two speeches.

However, the version of the speech with the Armenian reference was included in Nazi Conspiracy and Aggression, a collection of documentary evidence prepared by the American and British prosecuting staffs for presentation before the Nuremberg trials.

== Veracity ==
Lochner had possessed a written record of the speech since August 1939. He had shown the speech to Sir George Ogilvie-Forbes, a British diplomat serving as counsellor and chargé d'affaires in the British embassy in Berlin from 1937 to 1939. Ogilvie-Forbes then transmitted the speech back to London in a letter dated 25 August 1939. In the letter, Ogilvie-Forbes refers to Lochner's informant as "a Staff Officer who received it from one of the Generals present at the [Obersalzberg] meeting".

During the interrogation of German major general Karl Bodenschatz at Nuremberg on 7 November 1945, the interrogator recorded that Bodenschatz "expressed the view that the content of L-3 contained the thoughts of Hitler at this particular time and that he believed that document, L-3, was a copy of the speech that was delivered by Hitler on this particular day".

In his memoir Bis zum bitteren Ende (To the Bitter End), Hans Bernd Gisevius, a German diplomat and intelligence officer during World War II, wrote that Admiral Wilhelm Canaris, who had been present at Hitler's speech, had secretly taken notes of what was said. Richard Albrecht, a German social researcher and political scientist, published a three-volume study (2006–08) on 20th century genocides that contained the text of the original German version of the Armenian quote (the L-3 text) for the first time. Albrecht concludes that the L-3-document "must be regarded as the [version] which most likely sums up and expresses what Hitler said". According to Albrecht, L-3 is most credible because Canaris was the only witness who wrote down what Hitler said simultaneously. Kevork B. Bardakjian, an expert in Armenian studies, also argues that the L-3 document originated in the notes secretly taken by Canaris during the meeting of 22 August 1939 and that it is "as sound as the other evidence submitted at Nuremberg".

In his 1987 survey of the historiography of the Holocaust, Canadian historian Michael Marrus wrote that recent research pointed to the authenticity of the L-3 document. Christopher R. Browning, an American historian of the Holocaust, stated in 2004 that the L-3 document, which contains the Armenian quote, is not likely to be an accurate version of what Hitler said but an apocryphal version that was purposefully leaked by the Poles to gain the support of Western nations. German historian Tobias Jersak cites the statement as evidence that Hitler believed that crimes committed during wartime would be overlooked. According to this interpretation, Hitler planned to unleash genocide upon the outbreak of war: "war would serve as a cover for extermination and the fighting would conceal the real war aim".

Margaret L. Anderson, a professor of history at the University of California, Berkeley, said in 2010 that "we have no reason to doubt the remark is genuine" and that, regardless of whether it is, the Armenian genocide had achieved "iconic status... as the apex of horrors imaginable in 1939" and that Hitler used it to persuade the German military that committing genocide might provoke condemnation but would lead to no serious consequences for the perpetrator nation. Historian Stefan Ihrig writes that the document containing the Armenian reference and its provenance is "sketchy, and the sentence in question is absent in other accounts of the meeting" but he adds that it is possible "that others did not write down this remark". Ihrig argues elsewhere that the Armenian genocide partially inspired the Holocaust but that there is "no smoking gun".

== Legacy ==
The quote has often been cited, particularly by Armenians, to support the interpretation that Hitler was inspired by the Armenian genocide to commit atrocities. International law expert Alexis Demirdjian sees the remark as "a depressing reminder of the effects of impunity". The reference is now inscribed on one of the walls of the United States Holocaust Memorial Museum in Washington, D.C.

In 2009, the International Association of Genocide Scholars used the quote in a letter to U.S. president Barack Obama advocating recognition of the Armenian genocide.

Professor in international law Lily Svanberg, argues that the failure to implement the responsibility to protect doctrine lends weight to Hitler’s statement, as the absence of consequences allows perpetrators to draw inspiration from past atrocities, making his reasoning appear "scarily up-to date" in light of contemporary genocidal actions such as the forced expulsion of all Armenians from Nagorno-Karabakh in 2023.

In 2014, Palestinian poet Najwan Darwish responded to Hitler's Armenian reference in a poem:

“Who Remembers the Armenians?”

I remember them and I ride the nightmare bus with them each night and my coffee, this morning I'm drinking it with them

You, murderer -

Who remembers you?

— Nothing More to Lose (2014)

== Sources ==
- Dadrian, Vahakn (1995). The History of the Armenian Genocide: Ethnic Conflict from the Balkans to Anatolia to the Caucasus. Oxford: Berghahn Books. ISBN 978-157181666-5.
- Lochner, Louis (1942). What About Germany? (PDF). Dodd, Mead & Company.
- Travis, Hannibal (Winter 2013). "Did the Armenian Genocide Inspire Hitler?" (PDF). Middle East Quarterly. 20 (1): 27–35.
