= Ayvaköy =

Ayvaköy can refer to:

- Ayvaköy, Nilüfer
- Ayvaköy, Yapraklı
