= Kadıköy Anatolian High School =

Coordinates: 40.98278°N 29.02220°E

- Kadıköy Anadolu Lisesi; Mekteb-i Maarif
- Kadıköy Maarif College

Location
- Moda; Kadıköy, Istanbul; Turkey

Information
- School type: Public, Day & Boarding
- Founded: 1955
- Principal: Mahir Karahasanoğlu
- Language: English & Turkish; German as a second language
- Colors: Green and yellow
- Mascot: Gull
- Website: kadikoyanadolulisesi.k12.tr

Kadıköy Anatolian High School (Turkish: Kadıköy Anadolu Lisesi), also commonly known as Kadıköy Maarif College, abbreviated Kadıköy Maarif or KAL, is a high school in Moda, Istanbul. The education languages are Turkish and English.

== History ==
The original school building dates back to before World War I and was built by the Franciscan Capuchin Order. The building was inhabited by the followers of this sect for many years. After the National Ministry of Education decided to open a high school in Kadikoy district, negotiations that lasted many years took place between the ministry and the Capuchins. In 1955, the school opened as Kadıköy Maarif. In 1968, a second building was added to the school which served as a dormitory. In 1976 and 1977, two more buildings were added.

After a new education structure was established by the Ministry of Education, the School's name changed from Kadıköy Maarif Koleji to its present name, Kadıköy Anadolu Lisesi (KAL). Like Galatasaray High School and Istanbul High School, it used to have a 2-year English preparation period with a following independent curriculum, but in 2006 KAL adopted the regular 4-year lycee education following a 1-year prep period.

== Headmasters of the school ==
Headmaster	Years
Mete ASLAN (First Principal)	(Unknown Period)
Macit KILIÇERİ (Founding Headmaster)	1955–1958
Kamil GÜNEL	1958–1960
Vehbi GÜNEY	1960–1971
Süleyman ÖZYİĞİT	1971–1978
Selçuk EROĞLU	1980–1980
Yunus Emre ÖZULU	1980–1982
Hikmet DEMİRÇELİK	1982–1985
Yüksel KANYA	1985–1985
Turan Cavit ÖZ	1985–1986
Mustafa TÜRKÖZ	1986–1990
Orhan TEKİN	1991–1992
Mustafa TÜRKÖZ	1992–1993
Orhan TEKİN	1993–1994
Velittin DEMİRKOL (Substitute)	1994–1996
Mustafa TÜRKÖZ	1996–1999
Osman Nuri EKİZ	1999–2010
Semiha GEZER	2010–2012
Mehmet Kamil ÖNALAN	2012-2015
Halit CİTTIR	2015-2017
Zakire ALP (Substitute)	2017
Selman KÜÇÜK	2017-2018
Ali Fuat GÜNEY	2018-2024
Mahir KARAHASANOĞLU	2024-

== Kadıköy Maarif College Extracurricular Activities ==
=== Publications ===
- Martı (The Literature Magazine published quarterly)
- Echo (The School's Newspaper published monthly)
- Kadıköy Maarif (Quarterly Magazine published by Kalid, Writers are all graduates)

=== Sports ===
- Juggling
- Badminton
- Basketball
- Football (soccer)
- Fitness
- Handball
- Volleyball
- Skiing
- Table Tennis
- Tennis
- Ultimate
- Archery
- Golf

=== Music ===
- Choir
- Drums
- Flute
- Guitar
- Ney
- Piano
- Strings
- Jazz Orchestra (Phönix)

=== Clubs ===
- Musical Club (MüziKAL)
- Juggling Club
- Kemalist Idea Club (Atatürkçü Düşünce Kulubü)
- Art and Drawing
- Astronomy
- Anime and Japanese Language
- Chess
- Cinema
- Acapella Club (VoKAL Acapella)
- Civil Protection
- Computer and Informatics
- Film Making
- Folklore
- Engineering Applications Club (MUKAL)
- English Culture and Literature
- English Theatre Club (KALetc)
- Math
- Model United Nations
- Modeling
- Modern Dance
- Philosophy
- Press Club
- Photography
- Green Moon Club
- Robotics
- Science and Technology
- Social Sciences
- Sport
- Theatre (KALTT)
- MUKAL (Engineering Club)
- TÜBİTAK
- Turkish Culture and Literature
- Turkish Debating (Türkçe münazara)
- Travel and Sightseeing
- Tracking and Camping
- European Youth Parliament (EYP)
- Fitness and Weight Lifting (FitKAL)

== Notable alumni ==
- Can Gürzap, actor and author
- Mehmet Ufuk Uras, politician
- Utkan Demirci, scientist
- Acun Ilıcalı, artist
- Altan Erkekli, artist
- Nilgun Marmara, author
- Seyhan Erözçelik, author
- Bülent Ortaçgil, musician
- Hasret Gültekin, musician
- Mazhar Alanson, musician
- Mert Yücel, musician
- Derya Büyükuncu, swimmer
- Erdil Yaşaroğlu, cartoonist
- Ozan Çolakoğlu, musician
- Derya Büyükuncu, swimmer
