= Demirchyan =

Demirchyan or Demirchian or Demirjian (Armenian: Դեմիրճյան, Western Armenian Տէմիրճեան, derived from Turkish demirci [demir "iron" + ci "agentive suffix"], meaning "blacksmith") is an Armenian surname. Notable people with the surname include:

== Demirchyan ==
- Derenik Demirchian (1877–1956), Georgian-born Armenian poet, writer, translator and playwright
- Hovhannes Demirchyan (born 1975), Armenian footballer
- Karen Demirchyan (1932–1999), Soviet Armenian communist politician
- Stepan Demirchyan (born 1959), Armenian politician

== Demirjian ==
- Alexis Demirdjian (born 1976), Canadian lawyer
- Eddie Demirjian, Lebanese Armenian politician
- Hovig Demirjian (born 1989), Cypriot Armenian singer, also known by the mononym Hovig
- Karoun Demirjian (born 1981), American Armenian journalist
- Adam Demirjian, former member of The Brave Little Abacus
