= Hitler's Obersalzberg Speech =

1939 speech by Adolf Hitler

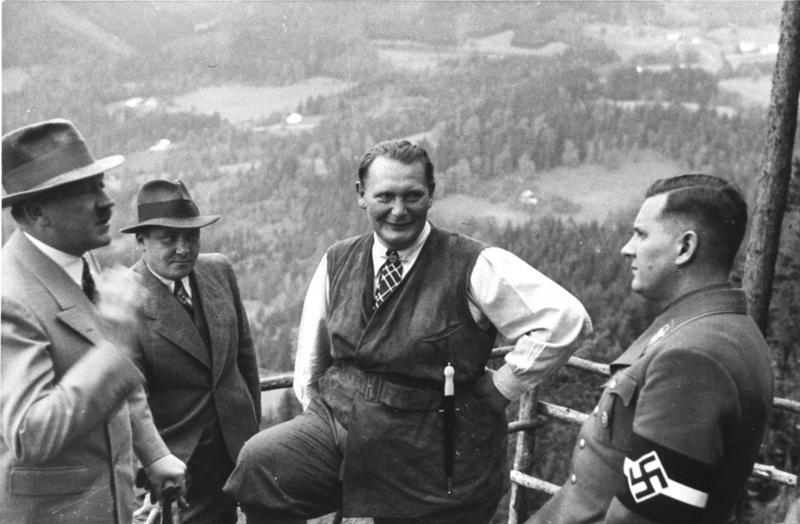
Hitler with Göring and von Schirach at Obersalzberg

The Obersalzberg Speech is a speech which Adolf Hitler delivered in the presence of Wehrmacht commanders at his Obersalzberg home on 22 August 1939, a week before the German invasion of Poland. Hitler urged his commanders to annihilate the enemy population with maximum brutality to gain living space (Lebensraum) for Germans. He reportedly uttered a premonition of the Holocaust: "Who, after all, speaks today of the annihilation of the Armenians?"

== Origin of the "Lochner" version of the Obersalzberg speech ==
In August 1939, American journalist Louis P. Lochner contacted American diplomat Alexander Comstock Kirk and showed him the text, but Kirk was not interested. Lochner next contacted British diplomat George Ogilvie-Forbes, who indeed transmitted it back to London on 25 August 1939. Canadian historian Michael Marrus wrote that Lochner almost certainly obtained the text from Admiral Wilhelm Canaris, chief of the Abwehr (German intelligence), who was present at the Obersalzberg Conference.

Three documents were grouped together during the Nuremberg trials that contained Hitler's speech on 22 August 1939 (1014-PS, 798-PS, and L-3,) and only document L-3 contained Hitler's reference to the Armenian genocide. Documents 1014-PS and 798-PS were seized by U.S. forces inside the headquarters of the Oberkommando der Wehrmacht (OKW) but the documents did not contain the Armenian quote. On 16 May 1946, during the Nuremberg trials, counsel for one of the defendants, Dr. Walter Siemers, requested that the court strike document 1014-PS, but his request was rejected. Document L-3 was brought to the court by Lochner.

According to Lochner, while he was stationed in Berlin, he received a copy of a speech by Hitler from his informant. Lochner later published the speech (in English translation) in his book What About Germany? (New York: Dodd, Mead & Co., 1942) as being indicative of Hitler's desire to conquer the world. In 1945, Lochner handed over to the Nuremberg prosecution a transcript of the German document he had received, and it was labeled L-3. Hence it is known as the L-3 document. The speech is also found in a footnote to notes about a speech that Hitler held in Obersalzberg on 22 August 1939 and was published in the German foreign policy documents When later asked at Nuremberg who his source was, Lochner said it was a German named "Herr Maasz" but gave vague information about him.

The Times quoted from Lochner's version in an unattributed article titled "The War Route of the Nazi Germany" on 24 November 1945. The article stated that the document had been brought forward by the prosecutor on 23 November 1945 as evidence. However, according to the Akten zur deutschen auswärtigen Politik (ser. D, vol. 7, 1961), the document was not introduced as evidence before the International Military Tribunal for undisclosed reasons, and is not included in the official publication of the documents in evidence. Two other documents containing minutes of Hitler's Obersalzberg speech(es) had been found among the seized German documents and were introduced as evidence, both omitting the Armenian quote.

In Nazi Conspiracy and Aggression (colloquially known as "the Red Set"), a collection of documents related to the Nuremberg trials which was compiled by the prosecutorial team, the editors describe the relationship between the relevant documents as follows:

Just one week prior to the launching of the attack on Poland, Hitler made an address to his chief military commanders, at Obersalzberg, on 22 August 1939. [Three reports of this meeting are available: (L-3; 798-PS and 1014-PS). The first of the three documents (L-3) was obtained through an American newspaperman, and purported to be original minutes of the Obersalzberg meeting, transmitted to the newspaperman by some other person. There was no proof of actual delivery to the intermediary by the person who took the notes. That document (L-3) therefore, merely served as an incentive to search for something better. The result was that two other documents (798-PS) and (1014-PS) were discovered in the OKW files at Flensberg [sic]. These two documents indicate that Hitler on that day made two speeches, one apparently in the morning and one in the afternoon. Comparison of those two documents with the first document (L-3) led to the conclusion that the first document was a slightly garbled merger of the two speeches, and therefore was not relied upon.]

In his book What about Germany?, Lochner offered the following English translation of the third paragraph of the document L-3:

Our strength consists in our speed and in our brutality. Genghis Khan led millions of women and children to slaughter – with premeditation and a happy heart. History sees in him solely the founder of a state. It's a matter of indifference to me what a weak western European civilisation will say about me. I have issued the command – and I'll have anybody who utters but one word of criticism executed by a firing squad – that our war aim does not consist in reaching certain lines, but in the physical destruction of the enemy. Accordingly, I have placed my death-head formation in readiness – for the present only in the East – with orders to them to send to death mercilessly and without compassion, men, women, and children of Polish derivation and language. Only thus shall we gain the living space (Lebensraum) which we need. Who, after all, speaks today of the annihilation of the Armenians? (Note: In the original German, the third paragraph reads as follows: Unsere Stärke ist unsere Schnelligkeit und unsere Brutalität. Dschingis Khan hat Millionen Frauen und Kinder in den Tod gejagt, bewußt und fröhlichen Herzens. Die Geschichte sieht in ihm nur den großen Staatengründer. Was die schwache westeuropäische Zivilisation über mich behauptet, ist gleichgültig. Ich habe den Befehl gegeben – und ich lasse jeden füsilieren, der auch nur ein Wort der Kritik äußert – daß das Kriegsziel nicht im Erreichen von bestimmten Linien, sondern in der physischen Vernichtung des Gegners besteht. So habe ich, einstweilen nur im Osten, meine Totenkopfverbände bereitgestellt mit dem Befehl, unbarmherzig und mitleidslos Mann, Weib und Kind polnischer Abstammung und Sprache in den Tod zu schicken. Nur so gewinnen wir den Lebensraum, den wir brauchen. Wer redet heute noch von der Vernichtung der Armenier?)

== See also ==
- Anti-Armenian sentiment
- Anti-Polish sentiment
- Anti-Slavic sentiment
- Expulsion of Poles by Germany
- Functionalism–intentionalism debate
- Hitler's Armenian reference, reportedly made during the speech
- Occupation of Poland (1939–1945)
- Total war#Germany
- War of annihilation
