= Nilüfer, Bursa =

District of Bursa Province, Turkey

Nilüfer
- District and municipality
- A view of Nilüfer from Özlüce neighborhood

- Logo

- Map showing Nilüfer District in Bursa Province

- Location within Turkey Location within Marmara
- Coordinates: 40°17′N 28°57′E
- Country: Turkey
- Province: Bursa

Government
  - Mayor: Şadi Özdemir (CHP)
- Area: 552 km^{2} (213 sq mi)
- Population (2022): 536,365
  - Density: 972/km^{2} (2,520/sq mi)
- Time zone: UTC+3 (TRT)
- Area code: 0224
- Website: www.nilufer.bel.tr

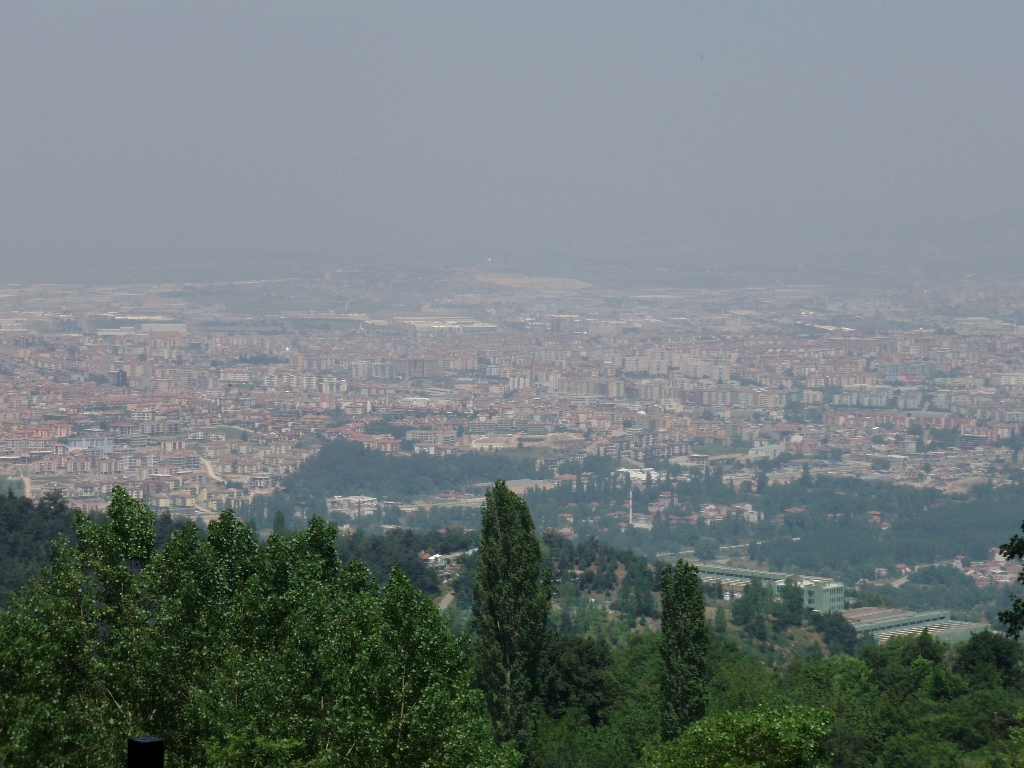
A view of Nilüfer from Uludağ road

Nilüfer (Turkish: [nilyˈfæɾ]) is a municipality and district of Bursa Province, Turkey. Its area is 552 km^{2}, and its population is 536,365 (2022). Established in 1987, it is one of the seventeen districts of Bursa Province. It is established as the main residential development area of Bursa in order to meet the housing needs as well as industrial and commercial structures.

== Name origin ==
The name of the district comes from Nilüfer River that passes through the district. Besides that also the name of the river comes from Nilüfer Hatun. According to traditional stories, Nilüfer Hatun ordered the building of a bridge over a river in Bursa and after the completion of bridge, both the river and the bridge were named "Nilüfer".

== History ==
Nilüfer district hosting the first settlement in Bursa Region as per some researchers, bears the traces of both Byzantine and Ottoman and the older periods in history. In Nilüfer; Tepecik Tumulus, Gölyazı and Tahtalı villages in Alaaddinbey Neighborhood and Aktopraklık Tumulus and Gölyazı islands region in Akçalar district are rich in historical findings. There are ruins of churches, mosques, baths, fountains, monasteries and castles in these regions together with historical remains and monument trees.

There are many historical structures scattered in different parts of Nilüfer. Mosques, bridges and baths from Ottoman region and church ruins remained from various times. Some of them are: H. Ioannes Theologos Church in Çatalağıl village, Saint Helena Church in Özlüce Neighborhood, Demirci Mosque, Yaylacık Mosque, Mihraplı Bridge. Also Misi village and Gölyazı district are the richest ancient settlement areas in Nilüfer. The history of the district goes back to 6th century B.C.

== Population ==
Due to being a new residential development area, Nilüfer has a high population growth rate with respect to other places.

Historical population
Year	Pop.	±% p.a.
1990	65,799	—
1997	140,672	+11.47%
2007	251,344	+5.98%
2012	339,667	+6.21%
2017	424,909	+4.58%
2022	536,365	+4.77%
Source: 1990 census, 1997 census and TÜIK (2007-2022)

== Composition ==
There are 64 neighbourhoods in Nilüfer District:

- 19 Mayıs
- 23 Nisan
- 29 Ekim
- 30 Ağustos Zafer
- Ahmetyesevi
- Akçalar
- Alaaddinbey
- Altınşehir
- Ataevler
- Atlas
- Ayvaköy
- Badırga
- Balat
- Balkan
- Barış
- Başköy
- Beşevler
- Büyükbalıklı
- Çalı
- Çamlıca
- Çatalağıl
- Çaylı
- Cumhuriyet
- Dağyenice
- Demirci
- Doğanköy
- Dumlupınar
- Ertuğrul
- Esentepe
- Fadıllı
- Fethiye
- Gökçe
- Gölyazı
- Görükle
- Gümüştepe
- Güngören
- Hasanağa
- İhsaniye
- İnegazi
- İrfaniye
- Işıktepe
- Kadriye
- Karacaoba
- Karaman
- Kayapa
- Kızılcıklı
- Konak
- Konaklı
- Korubaşı
- Kültür
- Kurtuluş
- Kuruçeşme
- Maksempınarı
- Minareliçavuş
- Odunluk
- Özlüce
- Tahtalı
- Üçevler
- Üçpınar
- Unçukuru
- Ürünlü
- Yaylacık
- Yolçatı
- Yüzüncüyıl

== Industry ==
Nilüfer comes first among the districts of Bursa in terms of the economical contribution it provides to Turkey. Because, Bursa Organized Industry Area, Nilüfer Organized Industry area and Beşevler Small Industry Site, which provide employment opportunities for a great amount of Bursa population take place within the borders of Nilüfer. There are many other industry areas and business centers in Çalı, Kayapa, Hasanağa, Akçalar and Görükle under the body of Nilüfer. Nilüfer provides employment opportunities to 80% of Bursa population and derives great income for Turkey. The most important sectors within the district are textile, automotive, machine, spare parts and related industry products.

== Cultural activities ==
The cultural activities in district are organized mainly by Nilüfer Municipality. The Municipality provides several hobby and art classes in several activities, such as; drawing, sculpture, acting, photographing, ornament design, ebru, mosaic etc. Also several plays, concerts, exhibitions and conferences are performed every year in culture centers (such as Konak Kültürevi, Uğur Mumcu Sahnesi, and Nâzım Hikmet Kültürevi) of the municipality. In summer time, several open-air public concerts are given by different musicians as a part of two summer festivals organized by Uludag University and Nilüfer Municipality. Also there are several local, traditional festivals held by villagers and other small communities in district. Most of them originate from traditional harvest festivals.

== Sports ==
In 2014, the Minareliçavuş Spor Tesisleri was opened consisting of two football fields. It is home to Yeşil Bursa AŞ playing in the TFF Third League.

== Main sights ==
- Misi Village
- Gölyazı District
- Mihraplı Bridge
- H. Ioannes Theologos Church
- Nilüfer Bridge
- Demirci Mosque
- Uluabat Lake
- Ayvaini Cave
- Saint Helena Church

== Twin Cities and Partnerships ==
Nilüfer Municipality is twinned with;

- Ardino, Bulgaria
- Braila, Romania
- Nizami, Azerbaijan
- Mykolayiv, Ukraine
- Cerro, Cuba
- Tōkai, Aichi, Japan
- Gazimağusa, Northern Cyprus
- Umeå, Sweden
- Ķekava, Latvia
- Peja, Kosovo
- Serres, Greece
- Lublin, Poland
- Gotse Delchev, Bulgaria
- Châlette-sur-Loing, France
- Hanau, Germany
- Asenovgrad, Bulgaria
- Adalar, İstanbul, Turkey
- Dinar, Afyon, Turkey
- Kırklareli, Turkey
- Tuzlukçu, Konya, Turkey
- Vezirhan, Bilecik, Turkey
- Tut, Adıyaman, Turkey

Nilüfer Municipality has also partnership agreements with;

- Balatonfüred, Hungary
- Braslav, Belarus
- Veria, Greece
