= Kadriye, Nilüfer =

Village in Turkey

Kadriye
- Neighbourhood
- Location in Turkey Kadriye (Marmara)
- Coordinates: 40.092222°N 28.868333°E
- Country: Turkey
- Province: Bursa
- District: Nilüfer
- Population (2022): 121
- Time zone: UTC+3 (TRT)

Kadriye is a neighbourhood in the municipality and district of Nilüfer, Bursa Province in Turkey. Its population is 121 (2022).
