= Başköy, Nilüfer =

Village in Turkey

Başköy
- Neighbourhood
- Location in Turkey Başköy (Marmara)
- Coordinates: 40.2121°N 28.7526°E
- Country: Turkey
- Province: Bursa
- District: Nilüfer
- Population (2022): 252
- Time zone: UTC+3 (TRT)

Başköy is a neighbourhood in the municipality and district of Nilüfer, Bursa Province in Turkey. Its population is 252 (2022).
