= Büyükbalıklı, Nilüfer =

Village in Turkey

Büyükbalıklı
- Neighbourhood
- Location in Turkey Büyükbalıklı (Marmara)
- Coordinates: 40°15′N 28°46′E
- Country: Turkey
- Province: Bursa
- District: Nilüfer
- Population (2022): 492
- Time zone: UTC+3 (TRT)

Büyükbalıklı is a neighbourhood in the municipality and district of Nilüfer, Bursa Province in Turkey. Its population is 492 (2022).
