= Görükle =

Campus of Uludağ University in Turkey

- Neighbourhood
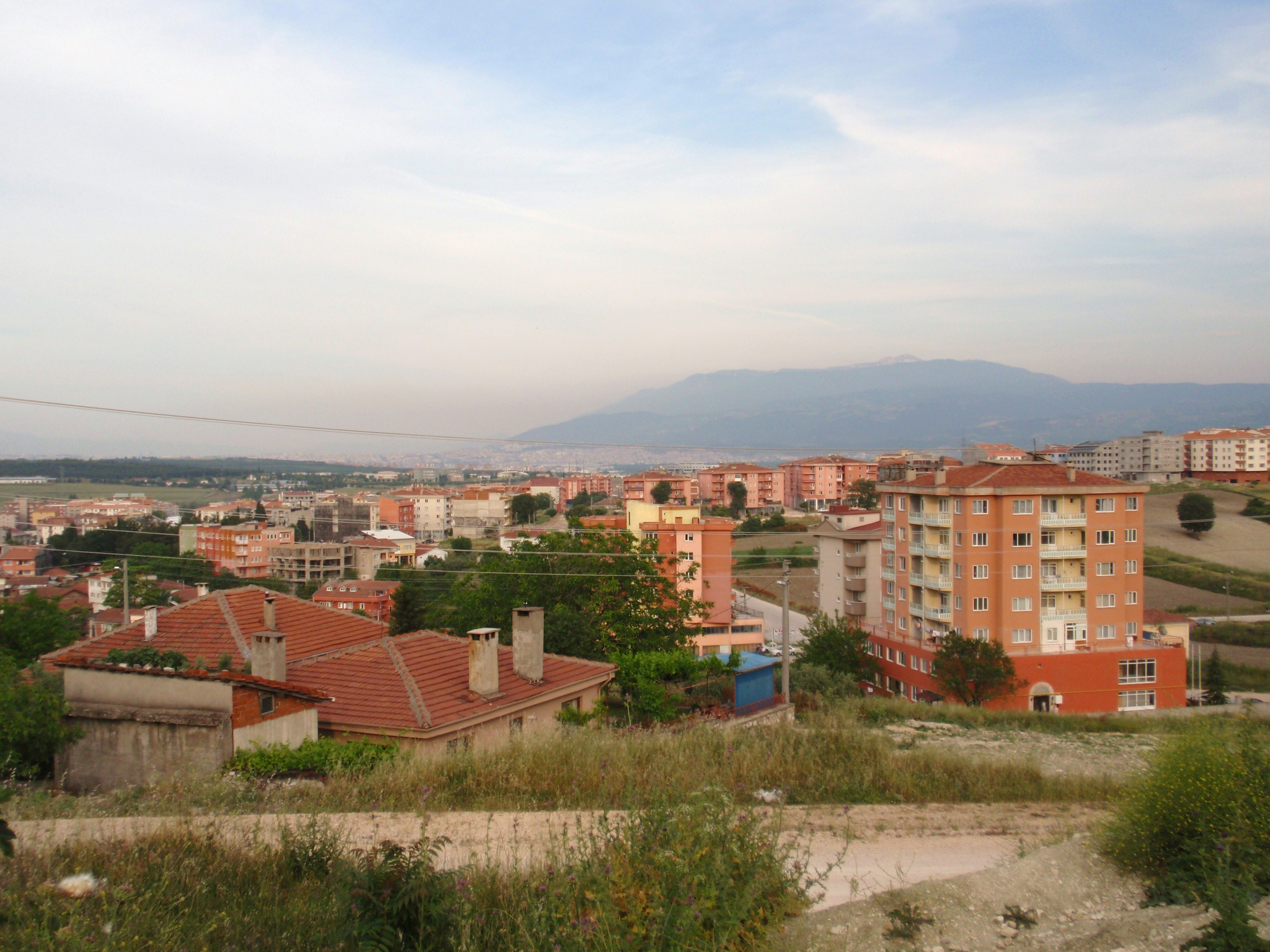
- A view of Uludağ from Görükle

- Location within Turkey Location within Marmara
- Coordinates: 40°14′N 28°50′E
- Country: Turkey
- Province: Bursa
- District: Nilüfer
- Population (2022): 35,882
- Time zone: UTC+3 (TRT)

Görükle is a neighbourhood of the municipality and district of Nilüfer, Bursa Province, Turkey. Its population is 35,882 (2022). It was an independent municipality until it was merged into the municipality of Nilüfer in 2008. It is a college town, being situated near the campus of Uludağ University and home to many college students.

The town is accessible by metro and shuttle buses from the central parts of Bursa. Shuttle buses regularly run to the nearby Uludağ University campus, and the town has places such as cafés and takeaways frequented by university students. It also has many private dormitory buildings, hostels, and apartment blocks where apartments are mainly rented to students.

== History ==
The place used to be a Greek village called Kouvouklia (or Kouvoukleia) in the Ottoman Empire and for several hundred years in the Byzantine Empire before that. The ethnic Greeks who had not already fled Kouvouklia were forced to leave in 1922 due to the population exchange between Greece and Turkey. In addition to college students, today's citizens include many descendants of Turks who emigrated from Greece as a result of the population exchange agreement in the 1920s after the Turkish War of Independence.
