= Nilgün Marmara =

Turkish poet (1958-1987)

- Nilgün Marmara Önal
- Born: 13 February 1958; Istanbul, Turkey
- Died: 13 October 1987 (aged 29); Istanbul, Turkey
- Resting place: Karacaahmet Mezarlığı, Istanbul
- Citizenship: Turkey
- Occupation: Poet

Nilgün Marmara (13 February 1958 – 13 October 1987) was a Turkish poet.

== Life ==
Nilgün Marmara was born on 13 February 1958, in Moda, Istanbul, as one of the two daughters of a Bulgarian Turk immigrant family. Her father Fikret Marmara, a Marxist, was an accounting manager. Her father immigrated from Pleven, Bulgaria, and her mother from Vidin to Istanbul.

She completed her high school education at Kadıköy Maarif College. She started her university life in Istanbul University Faculty of Literature, but could not continue there due to political reasons, took the exam again and won the English language and literature department of Boğaziçi University. She graduated from the university in 1985 with the thesis entitled Analysis of Sylvia Plath's Poetry in the Context of Suicide. After graduation she started working in a holiday village in Marmaris. Although she worked as a secretariat in different companies and as a civil servant in the Egyptian Consulate, her business life did not last long.

In 1982, she married industrial engineer Kağan Önal, whom she met through friends. Due to her husband's job, they lived in Libya for 16 months.

On 13 October 1987, at the age of 29, she committed suicide by jumping from the balcony of her house.

Ferda Erdinç, "She was a woman with a heavy seat, a child with six toes facing each other".Cemal Süreya in her work titled 841. Day, "Nilgün is dead. She killed herself by throwing herself out of the window of her house on the fifth floor, Ece Ayhan said. Zelda was a pretty different person. She seemed to me to change personality, even body, after a certain time in the evening. Her face was darkened, adding a beautiful but frightening glow to her eyes. She was also very young. I don't think she was thirty yet. This world was another life's waiting room or hangout. When I look back, I also find a pain on Nilgün's face.It's emerging today." Cezmi Ersöz, on the other hand, wrote and dedicated the book titled Forty Years, You Are Like One After His death. Also, Seyhan Erözçelik wrote the poem titled Nilgün's Göztaşı after Nilgün Marmara's suicide.

=== Discussions after her death ===
It was claimed that Nilgün Marmara did not commit suicide but was killed and that her husband, Kağan Önal, was negligent in the death of Nilgün Marmara.

Regarding the accusations brought against him, Kağan Önal said, "However, Nilgün was supposed to be treated, but she was running away from the doctor. She was not at home when the doctor came to visit her when she should have been. The doctor had waited. When she came, they talked... The doctor said to me, 'Your job is very difficult! She needs to be treated but she is very intelligent and cultured, meaning it is one of the most difficult cases...' Because to heal, she should not be engaging in intellectual activities. They were going to drown her with medication and she was going to become numb. In moderately cultured and intelligent cases, this disease would usually appear in their 20s, and lithium treatment for it would result in success. However, Nilgün was not of this type. Being treated, being convinced of this, being satisfied with the treatment were all separate problems. Therefore, she did not receive treatment. On the day that she died she had promised me that she would start the treatment again ." The book titled Red Brown Notebook, published after Nilgün Marmara's death, created a great controversy. Although the book says that Nilgün Marmara published her diaries, the only quote about her time in Libya was "Kağan is a dirty lecherous piece of shit, he goes to bars every day." and the book's biggest problem was how it portrayed her "Due to the way the book was edited and how omitting it was, Nilgün Marmara was falsely portrayed to be someone who is in great pain, only thinking of death and seldom poetry, has a sullen face, is cynical, and consequently was just her suicide, has not lived, basically someone who has not existed up until her suicide" It was published by Everest Publishing in 2016 with the following back cover letter, including the facsimile of the diary:

"The Notebooks, which have been published in full with the aim of putting an end to the series of misunderstandings, groundless suspicions, injustices and extreme comments that started since the diaries that Nilgün Marmara left behind were published without permission under the title Red Brown Notebook, removes the question marks about Nilgün Marmara. With Notebooks, "The speculations, fake news and false slanders revolving around the name Marmara are coming to an end. The notebooks also reveal a different portrait of Nilgün Marmara from the one known and assumed, by reflecting her view of daily life, her surroundings and relationships."[10]

Her notes other than her two diaries also got released in 2017 by Everest Publications with the title Papers.

== Works ==
=== Poetry ===
- Daktiloya Çekilmiş Şiirler (1988)
- Metinler (1990)

=== Journal ===
- Kırmızı Kahverengi Defter (1993, organized by Gülseli İnal)
- Defterler (2016)
- Kağıtlar (2017)

=== Research ===
- Sylvia Plath'ın Şairliğinin İntiharı Bağlamında Analizi (1985, It was translated into Turkish by Dost Körpe 20 years later. )
