= Çaylı, Nilüfer =

Village in Turkey

Çaylı
- Neighbourhood
- Location in Turkey Çaylı (Marmara)
- Coordinates: 40.276203°N 28.745527°E
- Country: Turkey
- Province: Bursa
- District: Nilüfer
- Population (2022): 322
- Time zone: UTC+3 (TRT)

Çaylı is a neighbourhood in the municipality and district of Nilüfer, Bursa Province in Turkey. Its population is 322 (2022).
