= Demirdjian =

Demirdjian (Armenian: Տէմիրճեան), Demiryan (Դեմիրյանը), is a common surname in Armenia originating from the Turkish word 'Demir', meaning iron.

In Turkish demirci (demir with the suffix -ci) means one who works with iron, therefore it can translate to the equivalent English surname 'Smith'. Demirdjian is the Armenized version of Demirci written in Latin script.

It can refer to the Armenian-American AGBU Manoogian-Demirdjian School in Los Angeles, California.

One writer who had the surname was Derenik Demirjian, who was almost 70 when his novel on the Vartanantz War made him a household name..

== Armenian Script ==
Դեմիրճյան (Eastern Armenian)

or

Տէմիրճեան (Western Armenian)

== See also ==
- John de Mirjian, American glamour photographer
- Demirchyan
