= Yaylacık, Nilüfer =

Village in Turkey

Yaylacık
- Neighbourhood
- Location in Turkey Yaylacık (Marmara)
- Coordinates: 40°10′23″N 28°54′11″E
- Country: Turkey
- Province: Bursa
- District: Nilüfer
- Population (2022): 2,022
- Time zone: UTC+3 (TRT)

Yaylacık is a neighbourhood in the municipality and district of Nilüfer, Bursa Province in Turkey. Its population is 2,022 (2022).
