= Hasanağa, Nilüfer =

Town in Nilüfer, Bursa Province, Turkey

Hasanağa
- Neighbourhood
- Location in Turkey Hasanağa (Marmara)
- Coordinates: 40°10′16″N 28°47′38″E
- Country: Turkey
- Province: Bursa
- District: Nilufer
- Population (2022): 1,638
- Time zone: UTC+3 (TRT)

Hasanağa is a neighbourhood of the municipality and district of Nilufer, Bursa Province, Turkey. Its population is 1,638 (2022). It was an independent municipality until it was merged into the municipality of Nilüfer in 2008. The village is a historical place. For Menthon, there is Lisus Wall in south-west of the village. Its name was Kızılcıklı in the past. A man named Hasan Ağa, the namesake of the town, built a school and a mosque in the village.

During the Greek invasion at the start of the Greco-Turkish War (1919–22), the village that was the future Hasanağa was burned by Greeks.

After the declaration the Republic of Turkey in 1923, the population of the village began to increase.
