= Kuruçeşme, Nilüfer =

Village in Turkey

Kuruçeşme
- Neighbourhood
- Location in Turkey Kuruçeşme (Marmara)
- Coordinates: 40.12587°N 28.822412°E
- Country: Turkey
- Province: Bursa
- District: Nilüfer
- Population (2022): 84
- Time zone: UTC+3 (TRT)

Kuruçeşme is a neighbourhood in the municipality and district of Nilüfer, Bursa Province in Turkey. Its population is 84 (2022).
