= Demirciler =

Demirciler may refer to:

== People ==
- Alperay Demirciler (born 1993), Turkish volleyball player

== Places ==
- Demirciler, Bayat
- Demirciler, Bolu, a village in the district of Bolu, Bolu Province, Turkey
- Demirciler, Borçka, a village in the district of Borçka, Artvin Province, Turkey
- Demirciler, Dursunbey, a village
- Demirciler, Kale
- Demirciler, İvrindi, a village
- Demirciler, Manavgat, a village in the district of Manavgat, Antalya Province, Turkey
- Demirciler, Mengen, a village in the district of Mengen, Bolu Province, Turkey
- Demirciler, Nazilli, a village in the district of Nazilli, Aydın Province, Turkey
- Demirciler, Serik, a village in the district of Serik, Antalya Province, Turkey

== See also ==
- Dəmirçilər (disambiguation)
- Demirci (disambiguation)
- Dəmirçi (disambiguation)
