= Atlas, Nilüfer =

Village in Turkey

Atlas
- Neighbourhood
- Location in Turkey Atlas (Marmara)
- Coordinates: 40.1224°N 28.8843°E
- Country: Turkey
- Province: Bursa
- District: Nilüfer
- Population (2022): 381
- Time zone: UTC+3 (TRT)

Atlas is a neighbourhood in the municipality and district of Nilüfer, Bursa Province in Turkey. Its population is 381 (2022).
