= Damirchi, Hashtrud =

Damirchi دميرچي
- Village
- Location within Iran
- Coordinates: 37°25′08″N 46°40′44″E
- Country: Iran
- Province: East Azerbaijan
- County: Hashtrud
- Bakhsh: Nazarkahrizi
- Rural District: Almalu

Population (2006)
  - Total: 42
- Time zone: UTC+3:30 (IRST)
  - Summer (DST): UTC+4:30 (IRDT)

Damirchi (Persian: دميرچي, also Romanized as Damīrchī) is a village in Almalu Rural District, Nazarkahrizi District, Hashtrud County, East Azerbaijan Province, Iran. At the 2006 census, its population was 42, in 7 families.
