= Karoun Demirjian =

American journalist

- Born: April 28, 1981 (age 45)
- Occupations: Multimedia international journalist and freelance reporter

Karoun A. Demirjian (born April 28, 1981) is a breaking news reporter for The New York Times. Previously, she was a multimedia international journalist and freelance reporter at the Washington Post covering defense and foreign policy, and before that was previously a correspondent based in the Post's bureau in Moscow. She has worked in Jordan, Russia, Israel, the West Bank, the Gaza Strip, and Germany. She is a classical soprano, and an amateur pianist and guitarist. She is fluent in Armenian and English, and conversational in Russian, German, Arabic, and Spanish.

== Early life ==
Karoun was born to Karen Der Parseghian and Ara Demirjian. Karoun grew up just outside Boston and studied piano and voice in a musical home. She was a church soloist (soprano) at St. Stephen's Church Armenian Apostolic Church of Watertown, Massachusetts, where her mother, Karen Demirjian, was a long-time choir member and assistant organist. In college at Harvard (WHRB) and Tufts (WMFO, the college radio station on College Avenue), she worked as a classical disc jockey and migrated into reporting the news. She sang in Harvard College Opera for several years and was its treasurer during her senior year, and she was a contributing writer for the Harvard Crimson in 2003. She completed two degrees: Harvard University, A.B., cum laude, History – 2003; Fletcher School of Law and Diplomacy, M.A. in Law and Diplomacy, International Law – 2006.

Demirjian was an intern at National Public Radio’s All Things Considered, from 2003 to 2006.

== Career ==
After graduation, Demirjian wrote freelance for The Christian Science Monitor. She worked for the Congressional Quarterly from 2008 to 2009, then at the United Nations, co-authoring reports on peacekeeping operations, disaster relief and emerging democracies, before she committed to her journalistic career. In 2010, she was a stringer in Israel, the West Bank and the Gaza Strip for the Associated Press. She then covered Capitol Hill for Congressional Quarterly and the Chicago Tribune, and also worked at the Tribune as a Metro reporter covering crime, the courts, and community news. As the Las Vegas Sun's only Washington correspondent, she reported on the White House, the federal courts, and Senate Majority Leader Harry Reid and the Nevada congressional delegation through two election cycles, and on national debates about energy, the economy, housing, defense, and immigration. In 2014 and for a year, Karoun Demirjian joined The Washington Post's bureau as a correspondent in Moscow, Russia while also working for NPR as a freelance reporter. Since 2015, she has been a freelance reporter covering defense and foreign policy for The Washington Post. She also can be seen as a political analyst for CNN and CNN International.

== Awards ==
Her articles were nominated for the Washington Press Club Foundation’s David Lynch memorial award for best regional coverage of Congress in 2012, 2013, and 2014, and her video packages have appeared on The Washington Post's website. She has received numerous fellowships, including a Fulbright Fellowship in Jordan, a Paul Miller Fellowship from the National Press Foundation (2013–2014), an Alfa Fellowship in Russia (2014–2015), and an Arthur F. Burns Fellowship in Germany and a Scripps Immigration Fellowship – each from the International Center for Journalists, and has served on the board of directors (2011–2014) of the national Regional Reporters Association.
