= Demirci, Nilüfer =

Village in Turkey

Demirci
- Neighbourhood
- Location in Turkey Demirci (Marmara)
- Coordinates: 40°10′48″N 28°56′16″E
- Country: Turkey
- Province: Bursa
- District: Nilüfer
- Population (2022): 14,824
- Time zone: UTC+3 (TRT)

Demirci is a neighbourhood in the municipality and district of Nilüfer, Bursa Province in Turkey. Its population is 14,824 (2022).
