= Damirchi, Naqadeh =

Damirchi دميرچي
- Village
- Location within Iran
- Coordinates: 36°56′16″N 45°28′33″E
- Country: Iran
- Province: West Azerbaijan
- County: Naqadeh
- Bakhsh: Central
- Rural District: Beygom Qaleh

Population (2006)
  - Total: 66
- Time zone: UTC+3:30 (IRST)
  - Summer (DST): UTC+4:30 (IRDT)

Damirchi (Persian: دميرچي, also Romanized as Damīrchī) is a village in Beygom Qaleh Rural District, in the Central District of Naqadeh County, West Azerbaijan Province, Iran. At the 2006 census, its population was 66, in 16 families.
