= Ürkməzli =

- Municipality
- Location within Azerbaijan
- Coordinates: 41°06′45″N 45°15′27″E
- Country: Azerbaijan
- Rayon: Qazakh

Population
  - Total: 1,151
- Time zone: UTC+4 (AZT)
  - Summer (DST): UTC+5 (AZT)

Ürkməzli (also, Urkmagly and Urkmezli) is a village and municipality in the Qazakh Rayon of Azerbaijan. It has a population of 1,151.
