= Dəmirçilər, Qubadli =

Dəmirçilər
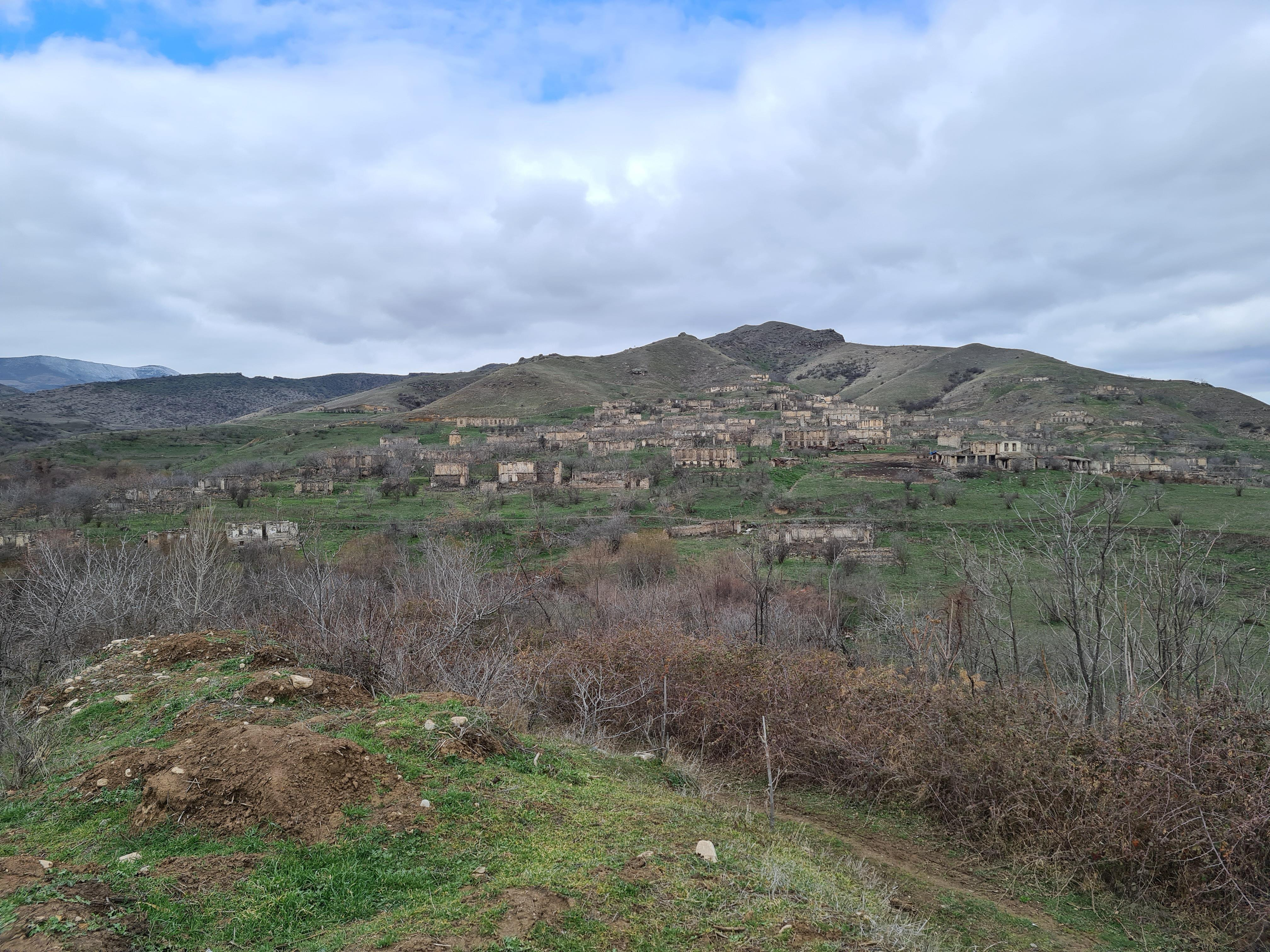
- Ruined state of the village following Armenian occupation

- Location within Azerbaijan
- Coordinates: 39°18′54″N 46°36′09″E
- Country: Azerbaijan
- District: Qubadli
- Time zone: UTC+4 (AZT)

Dəmirçilər (Damirchilar) is a village in the Qubadli District of Azerbaijan. It's located between the two rivers of Bargushad and Aghachay.

== History ==
The origin of this village's name comes from Turkish tribes which subsisted in this region over a period of history.

It was captured by Armenian troops in August 1993 during First Nagorno-Karabakh War and was renamed Yerkatavork (Armenian: Երկաթավորք). It was subsequently made part of the Kashatagh Province of self-proclaimed Republic of Artsakh. It was captured by Azerbaijan Army on 7 November 2020 during the Lachin offensive.

== Gallery ==
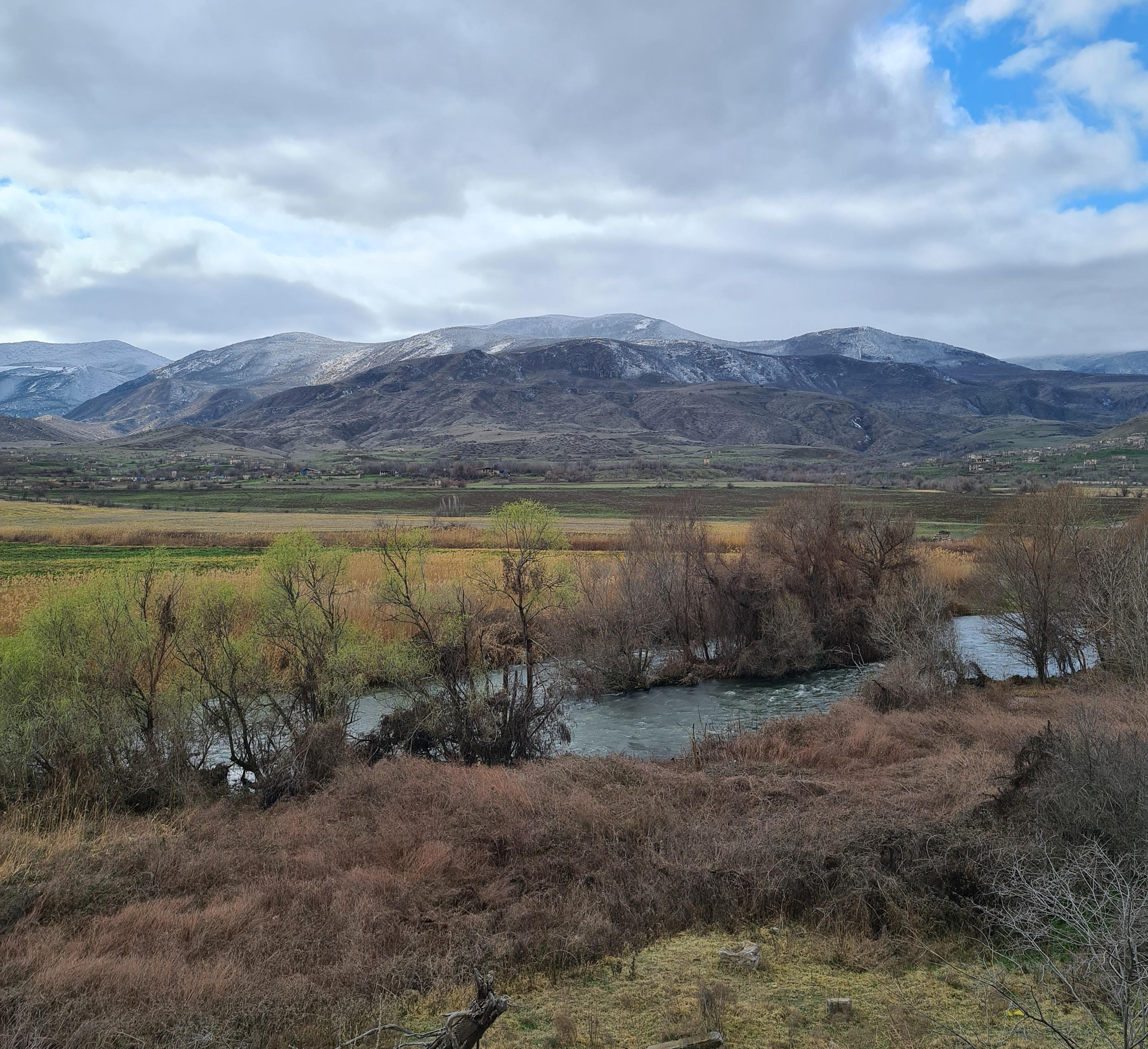
Nature around the village

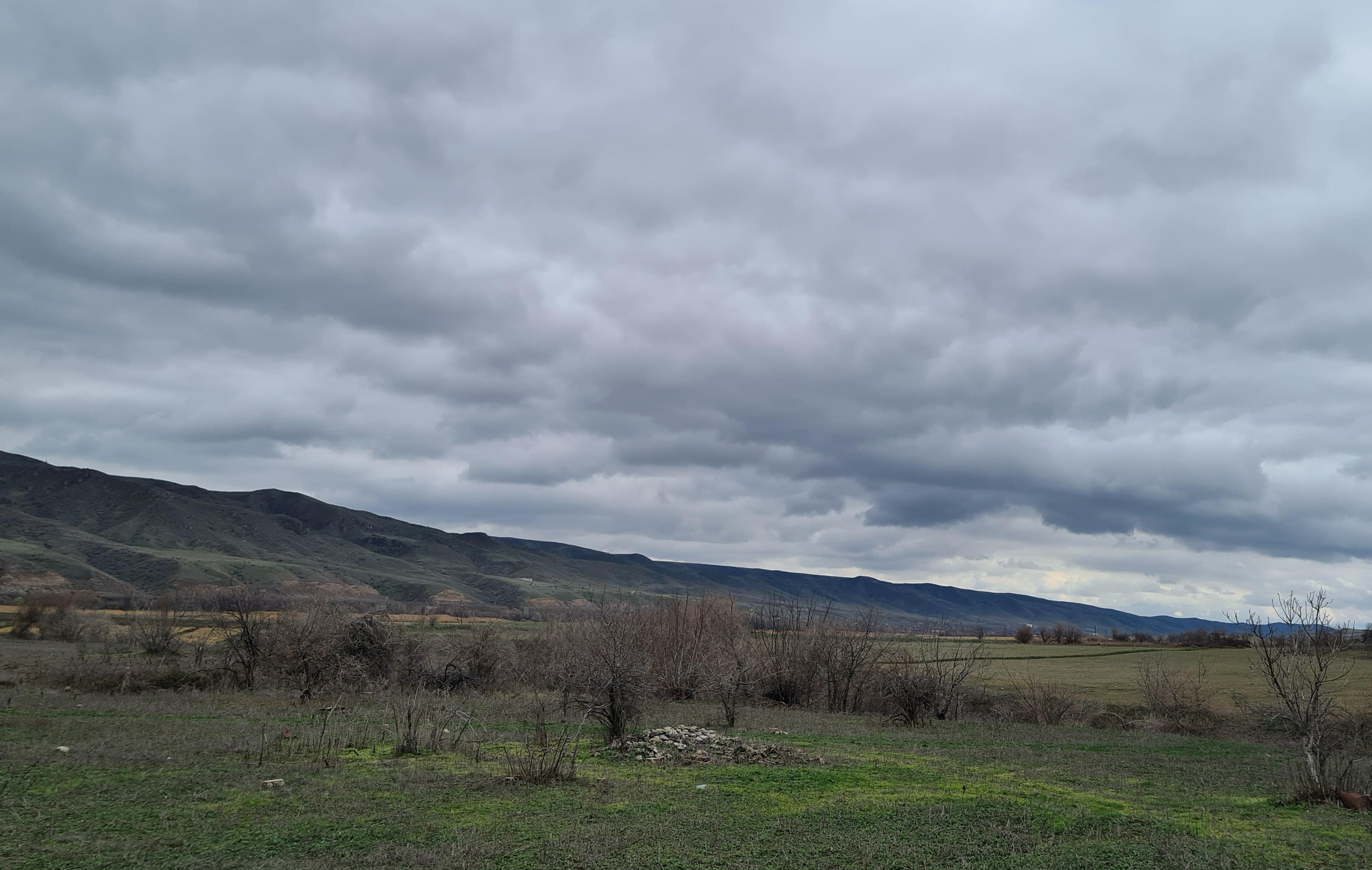
Nature around the village

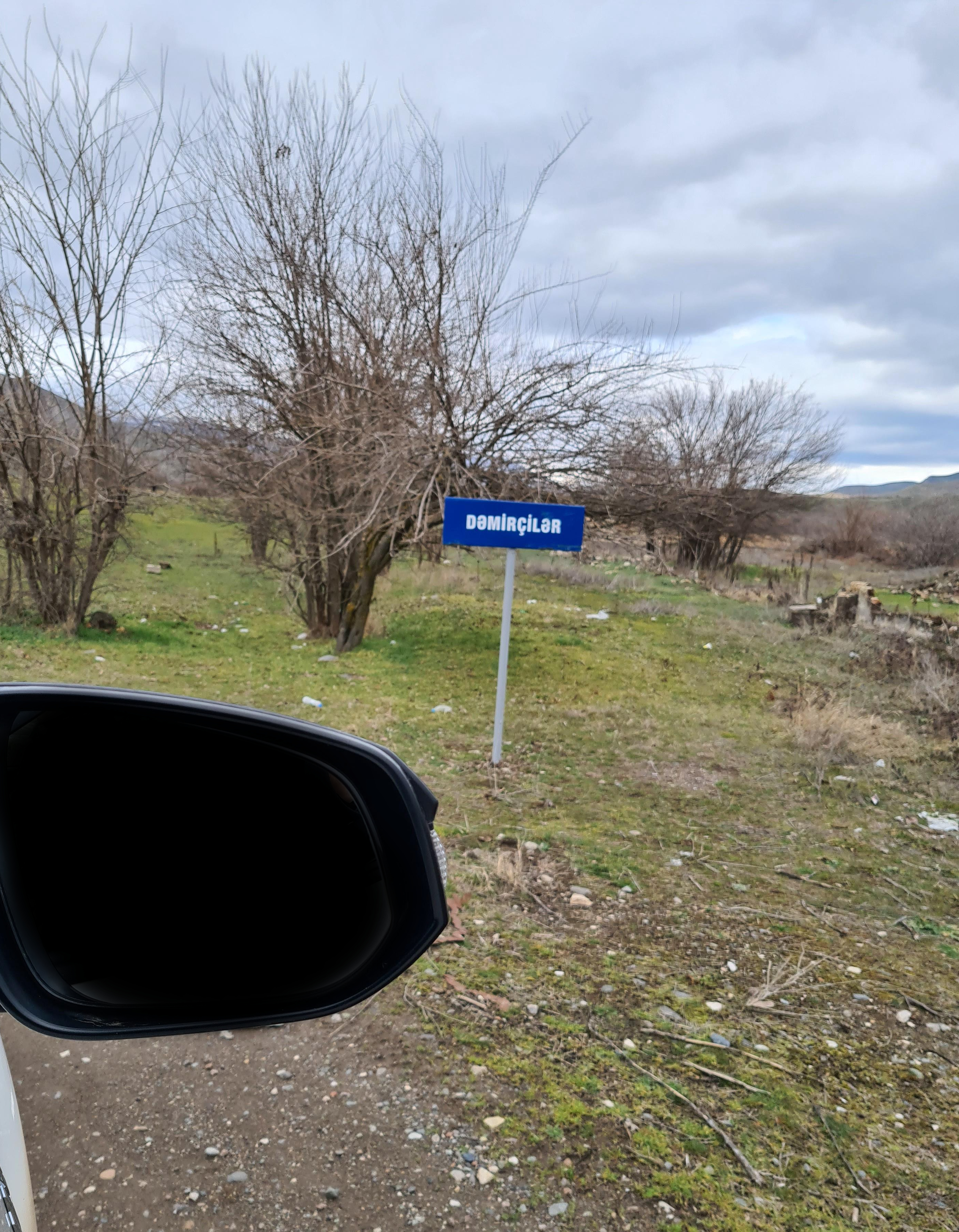
Sign at the entrance of Damirchilar

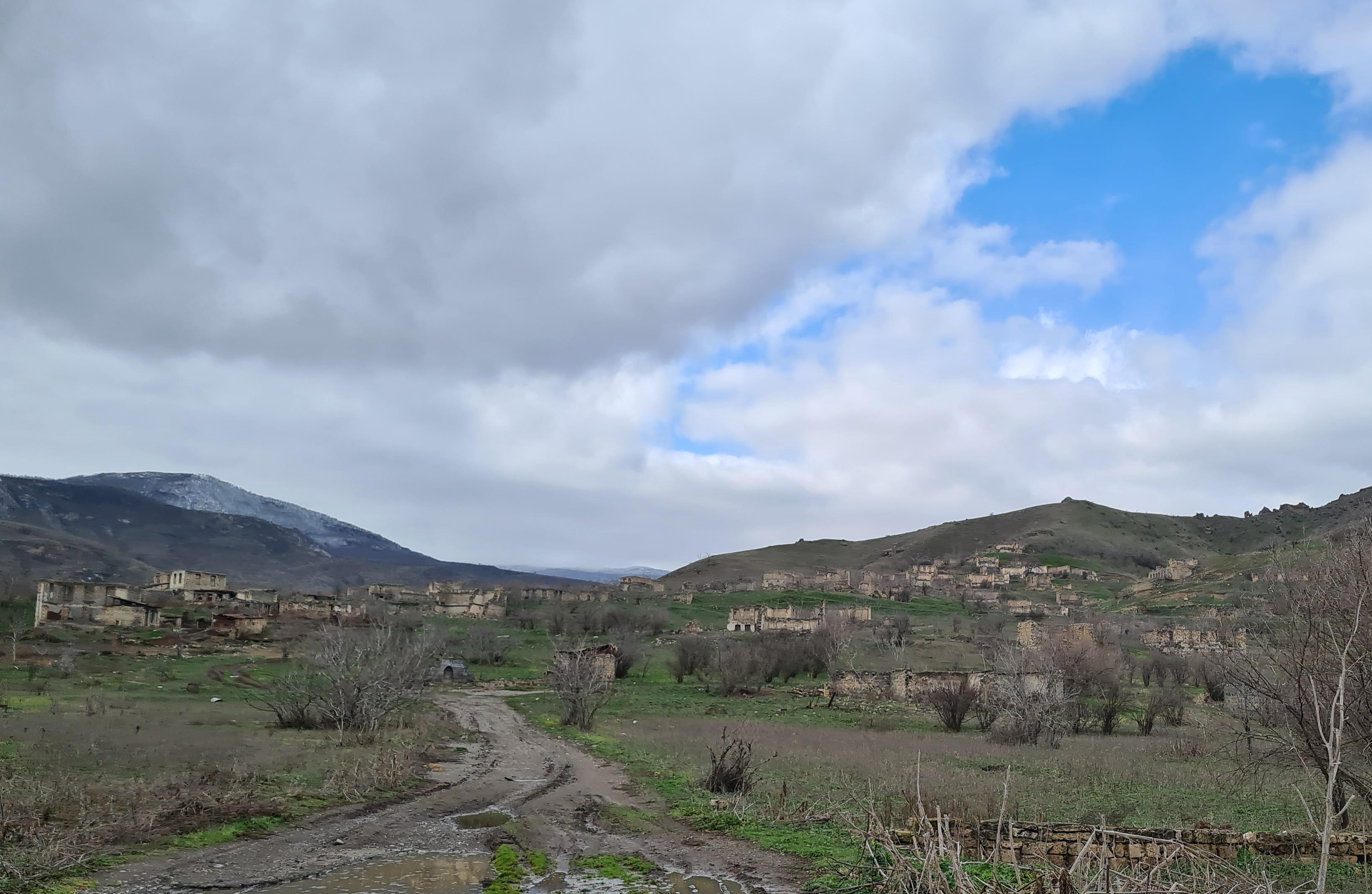
Ruined state of the Damirchilar village in the Qubadli District of Azerbaijan

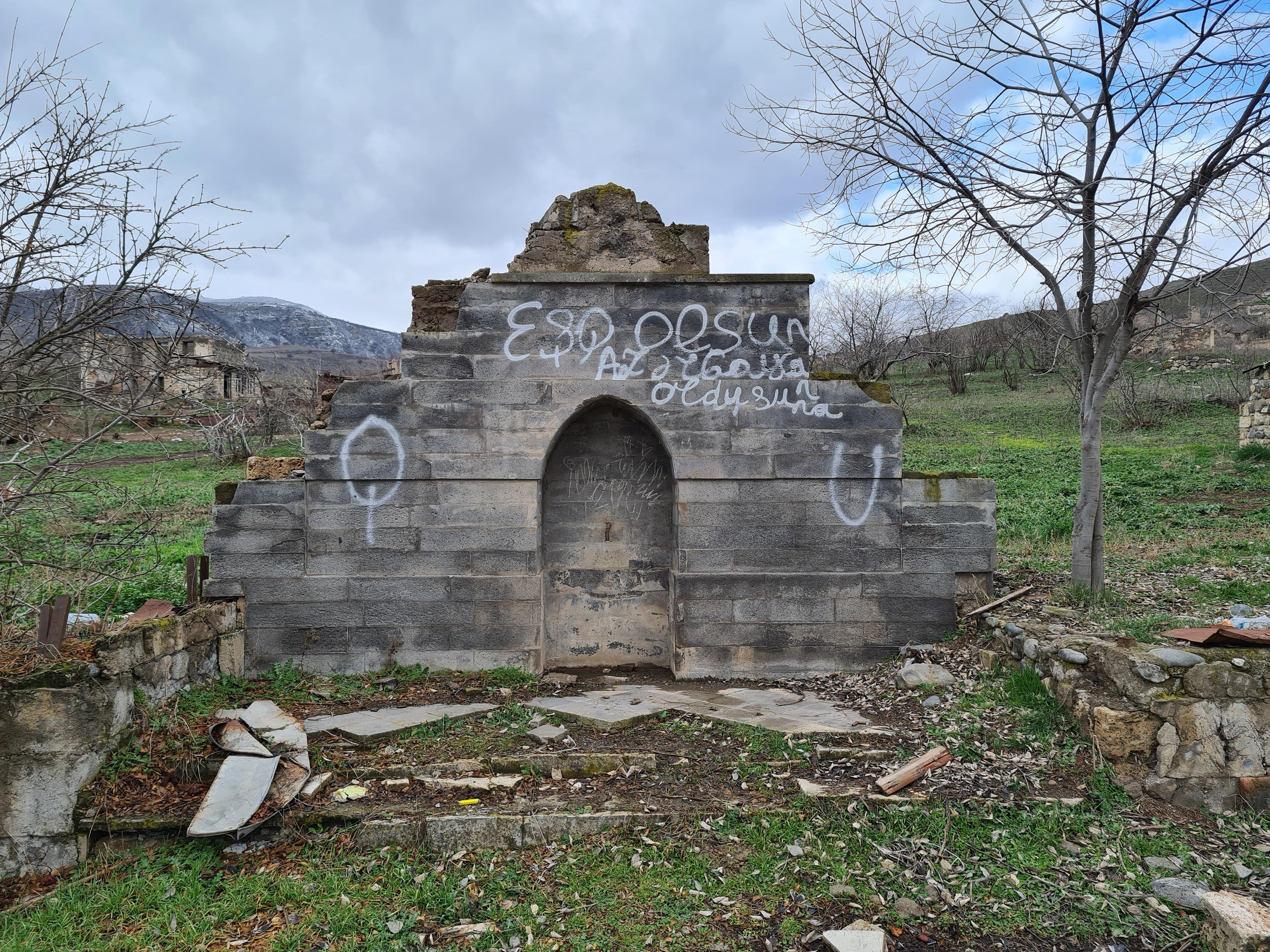
Ruined memorial spring in the village

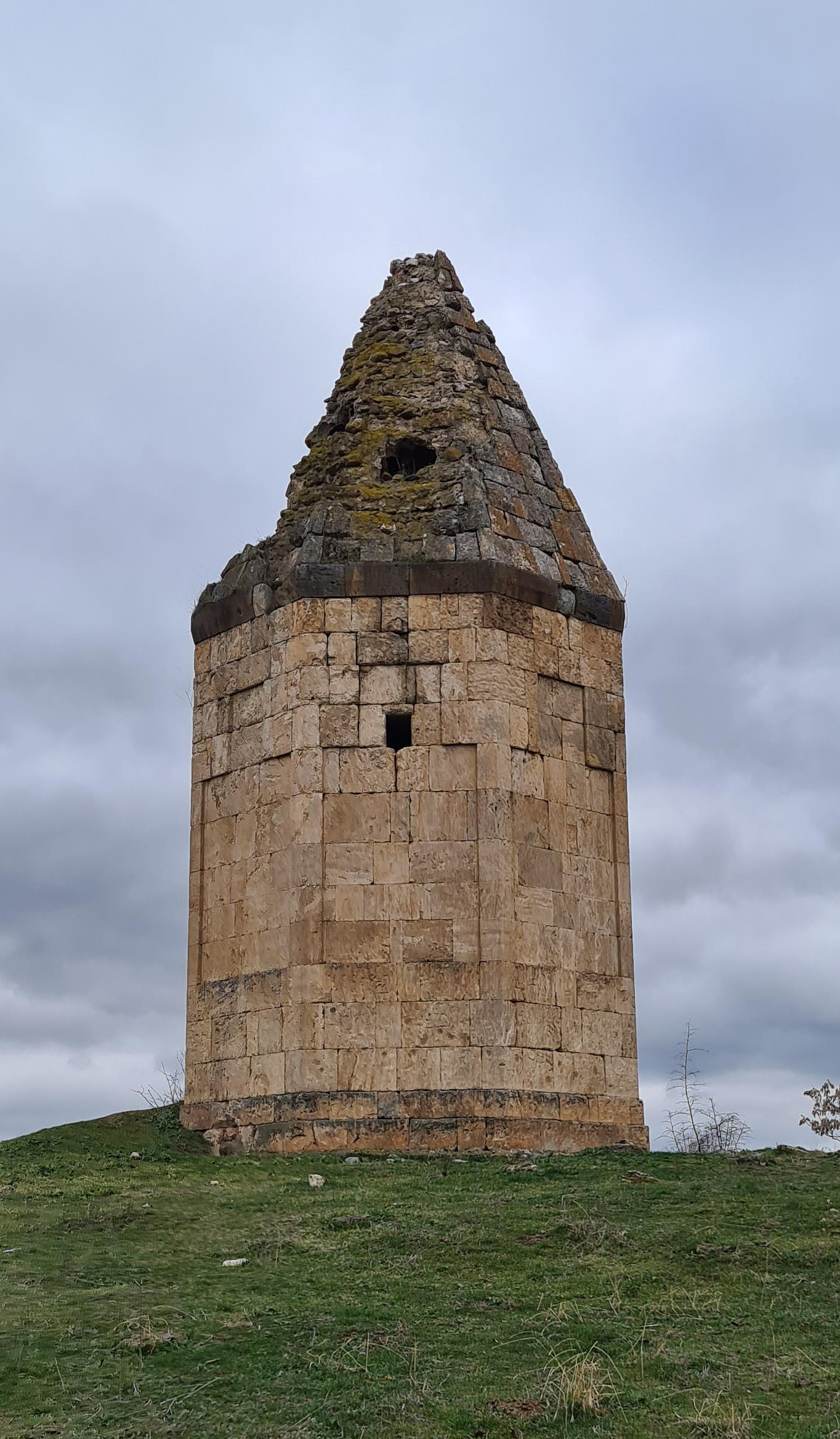
Back side of a Mausoleum near the village

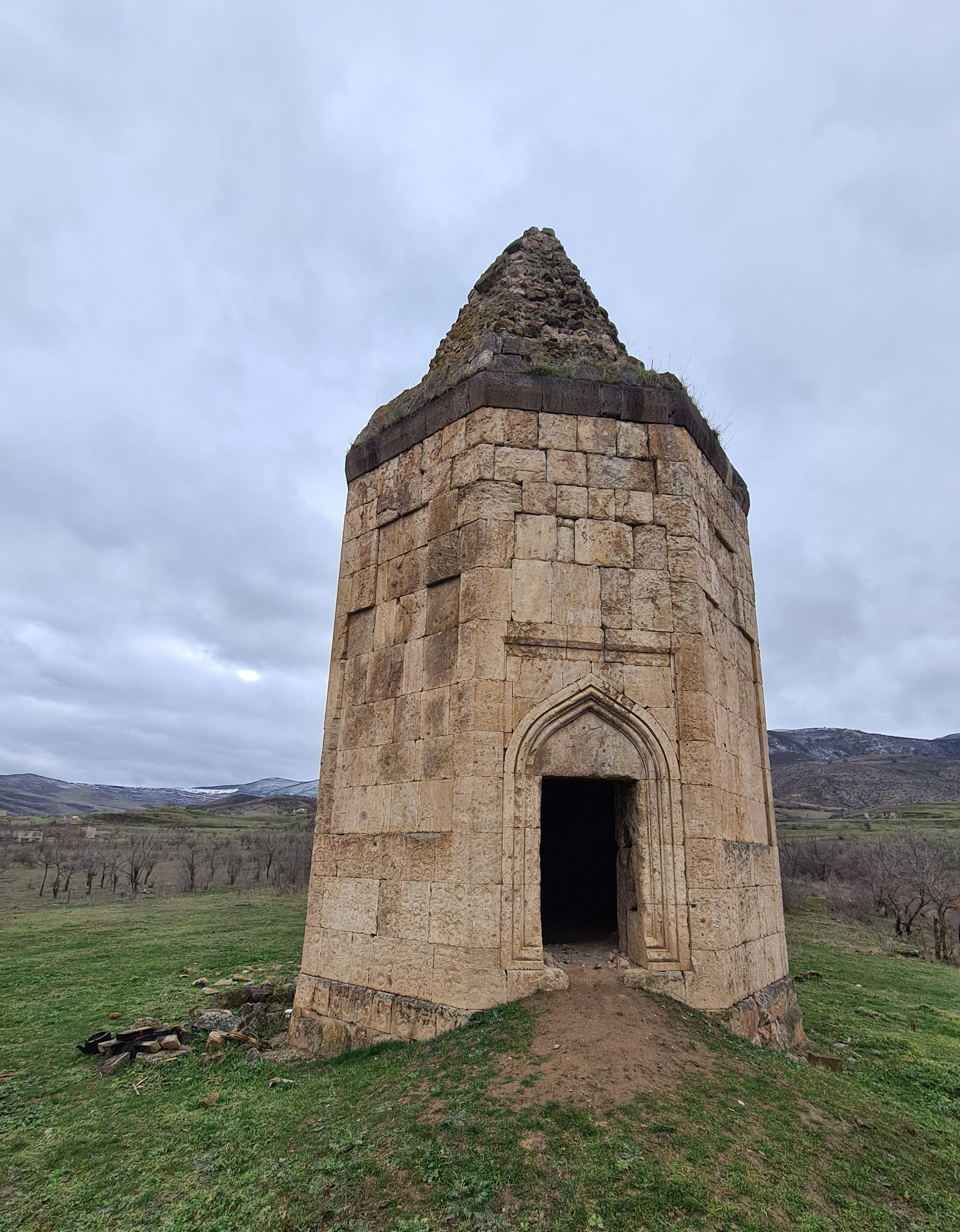
Front of a Mausoleum near the village

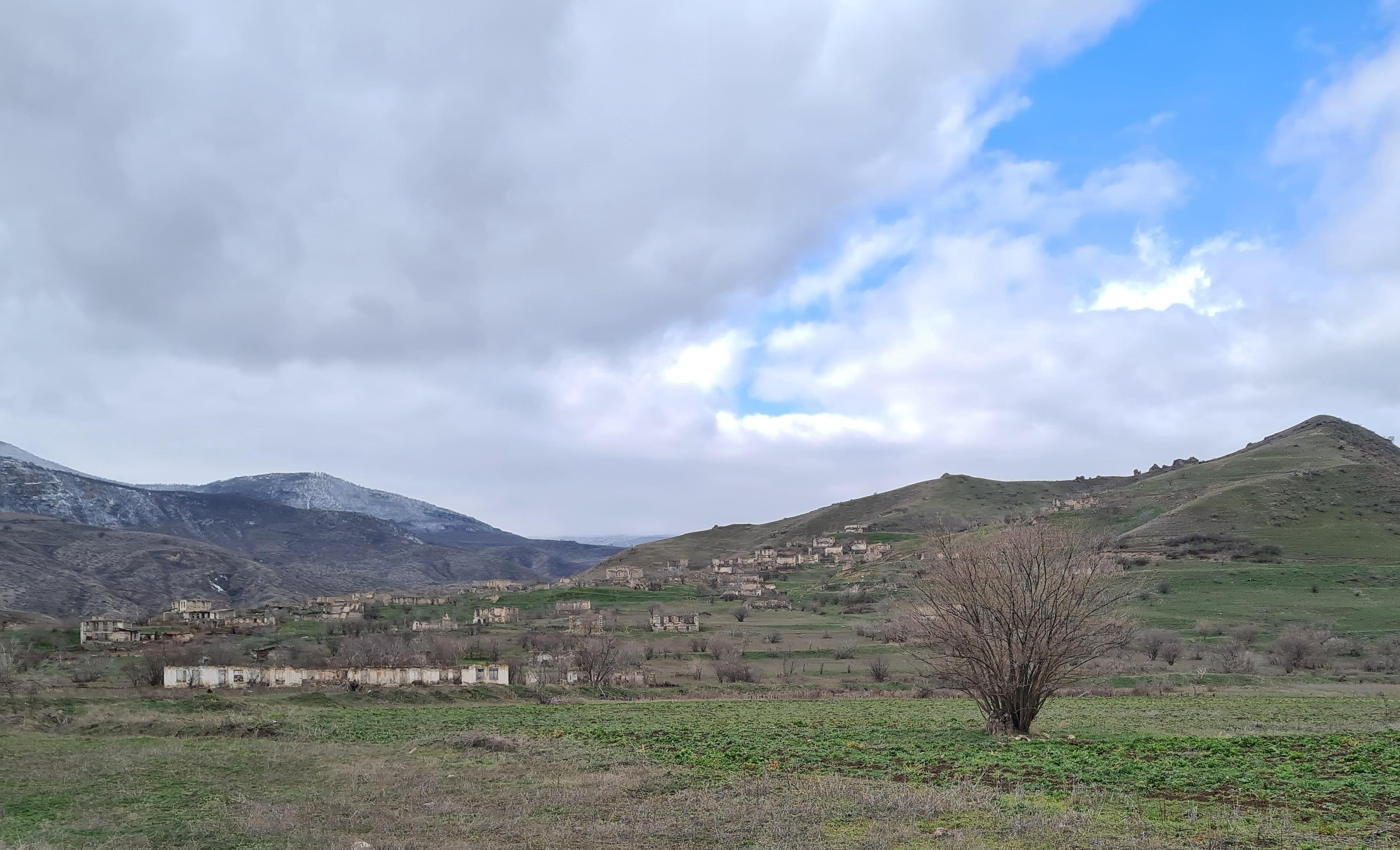
View of ruined state of Damirchilar village

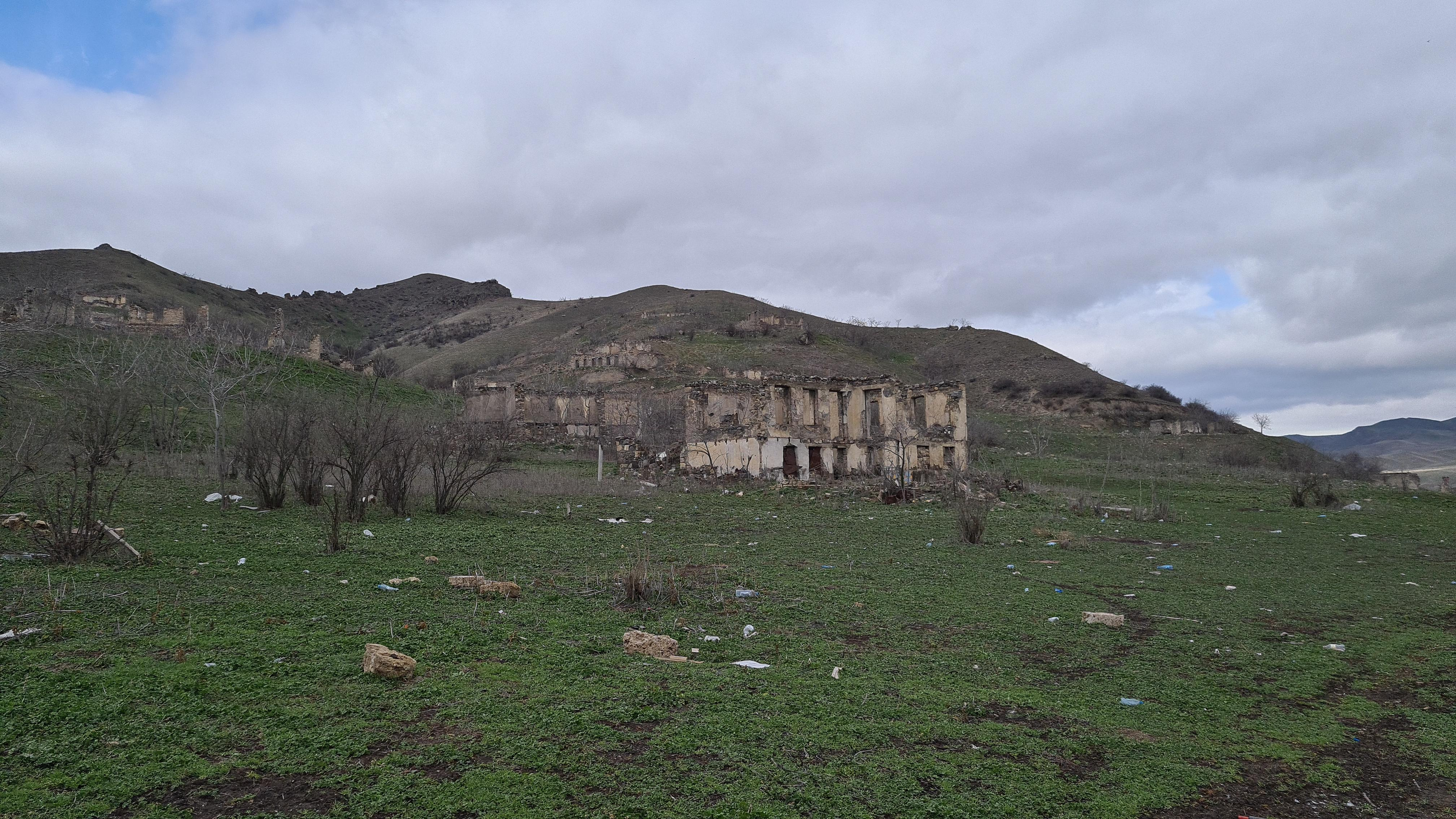
Ruined homes in the village

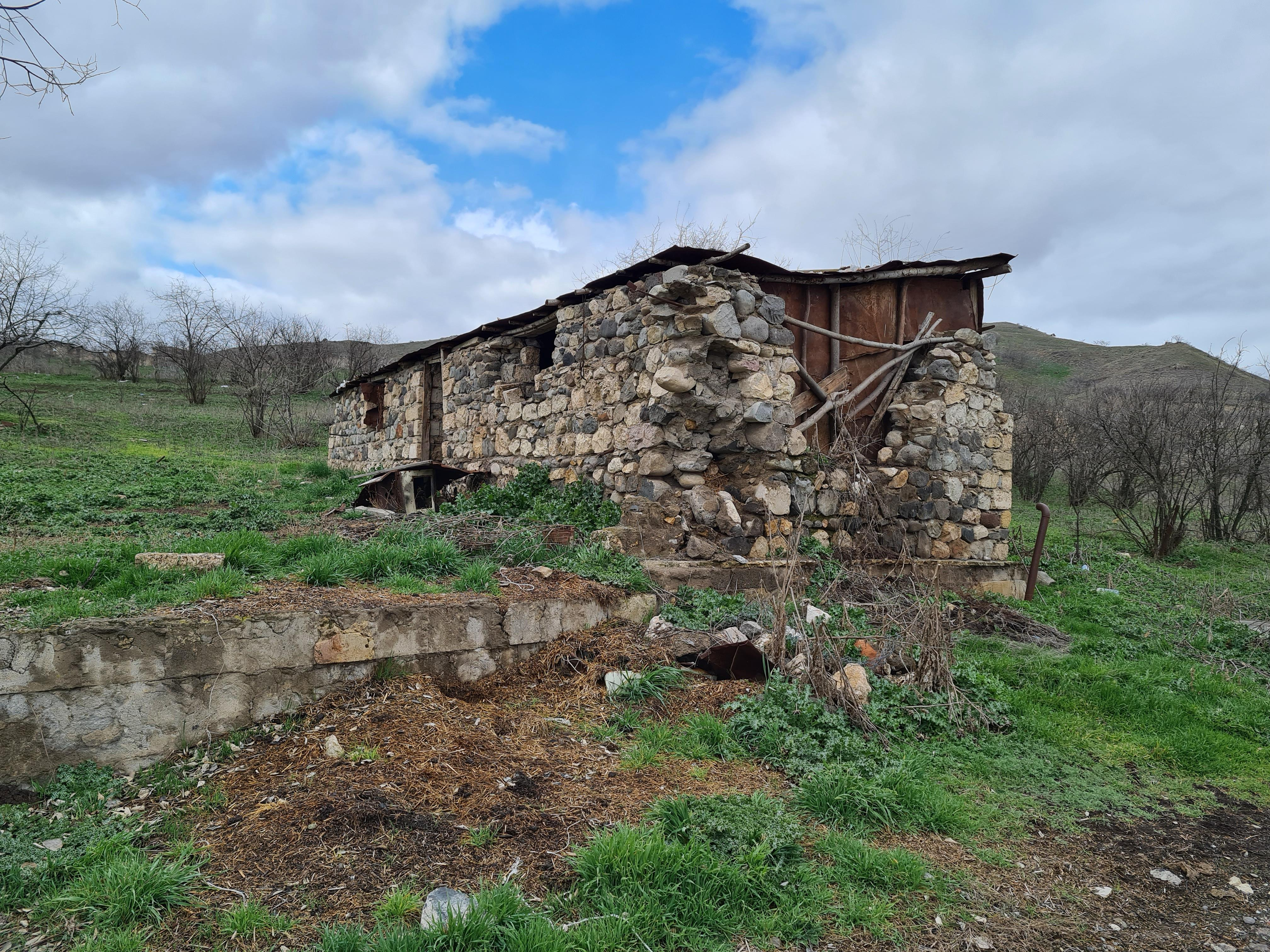
Destroyed house in the village

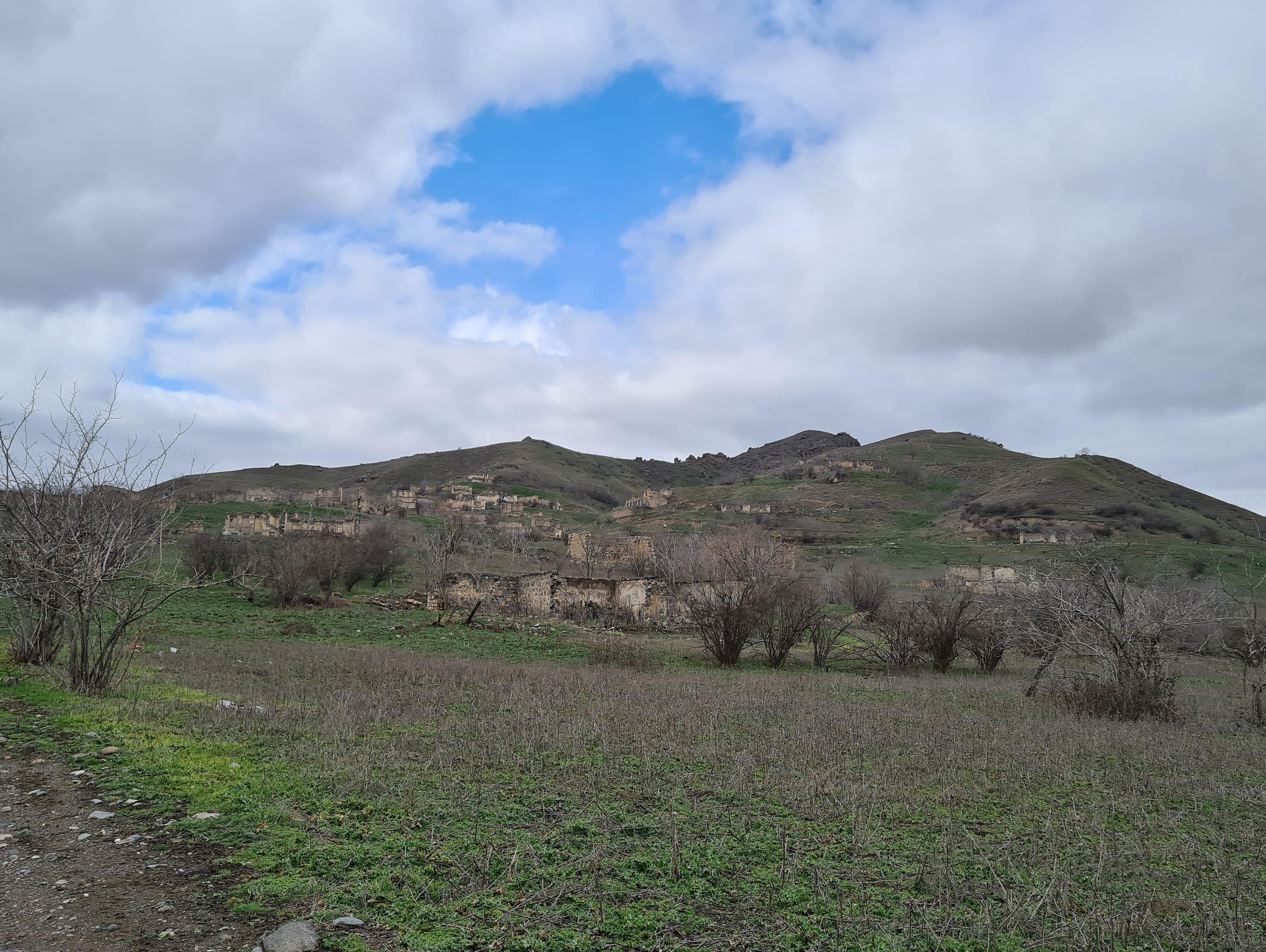
Ruined homes in the village
