= Dəmirçi, Masally =

Dəmirçi is a village and municipality in the Masally Rayon of Azerbaijan. It has a population of 1,918.

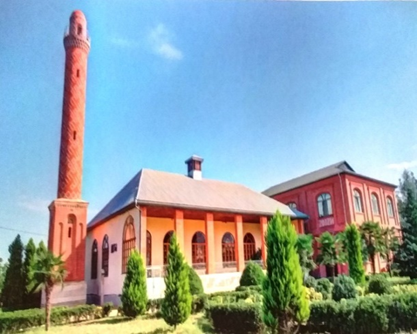
