= Kosalar, Qazax =

Kosalar
- Municipality
- Location within Azerbaijan
- Coordinates: 41°07′59″N 45°21′33″E
- Country: Azerbaijan
- Rayon: Qazakh

Population
  - Total: 3,869
- Time zone: UTC+4 (AZT)
  - Summer (DST): UTC+5 (AZT)

Kosalar is a village and municipality in the Qazakh Rayon of Azerbaijan. It has a population of 3,869.
