= Ayvaköy, Nilüfer =

Village in Turkey

Ayvaköy
- Neighbourhood
- Location in Turkey Ayvaköy (Marmara)
- Coordinates: 40.1267°N 28.7008°E
- Country: Turkey
- Province: Bursa
- District: Nilüfer
- Population (2022): 160
- Time zone: UTC+3 (TRT)

Ayvaköy is a neighbourhood in the municipality and district of Nilüfer, Bursa Province in Turkey. Its population is 160 (2022).
