= Tan Tolga Demirci =

- Born: Tan Tolga Demirci; 31 December 1974 (age 51); Istanbul, Turkey
- Citizenship: Turk
- Occupations: Filmmaker, director, writer
- Years active: 1999–present

Tan Tolga Demirci (born 31 December 1974) is a film director and writer. He graduated from Cinematography at Dokuz Eylül University in 1996. In the meantime, he has written an extended essay named "The Psychoanalysis of Horror Genre". This thesis became a book in 2006.

== Filmography ==
Year	Title	Language	Awards
1999	Anna		
2000	Are Trains Abandoned or the Stations?		
2001	Salt Lake		
2002	What About Prague?		
2003	Erses Apt. No: 8		
2003	Spontaneously Stories		
2003	Alphabetical Dreams		
2004	Klecks		
2005	The Brief of My Life		
2006	Gomeda		
2007	Felix Und Scorpion		
2011	Entrechat		
