= Utkan Demirci =

American academic

Utkan Demirci is a tenured professor and an academic entrepreneur at Stanford University at the departments of Radiology and Electrical Engineering (by courtesy). He served as the Interim Division Chief and Director of the Canary Center at Stanford for Cancer Early Detection in the Department of Radiology.

== Education ==
Demirci received his B.S. degree in electrical engineering in 1999 as a James B. Angell Scholar (summa cum laude) from University of Michigan in Ann Arbor. He received his M.S. degree in 2001 in electrical engineering, his M.S. degree in management science and engineering in 2005, and his Ph.D. in electrical engineering in 2005, all from Stanford University.

== Research ==
Before returning to Stanford, Demirci was an associate professor of medicine at Brigham and Women's Hospital, Harvard Medical School and at Harvard-MIT Division of Health Sciences and Technology serving at the Division of Biomedical Engineering, Division of Infectious Diseases and Renal Division. In 2006, he was named in the MIT Technology Review TR35 as one of the top 35 innovators in the world under the age of 35.

Demirci serves as the principal investigator for the Bio-acoustic MEMS in Medicine Lab (BAMM) at the Canary Center at Stanford University for Cancer Early Detection. He has published over 200 peer-reviewed journal articles, and seven edited books. He has received the NSF CAREER Award, and IEEE EMBS Early Career Award. He is a fellow of the American Institute for Medical and Biological Engineering (AIMBE), and Distinguished Investigator of the Academy for Radiology and Biomedical Imaging Research; and serves as an editorial board member for a number of peer-reviewed journals. His work in microfluidics has led to the development of FDA-approved platform technologies in medicine and many of his inventions have been industry licensed. The Zymot tool, that he has translated from his lab to the clinic has already been utilized in over 500,000 clinical cases, revolutionizing the processing and selection of sperm cells in IVF clinics and IUI applications. He is the co-founder of DxNow, Zymot, Levitas Bio, Hermes Bio and serves as advisor to early stage companies.
