= Alexis Demirdjian =

Canadian lawyers

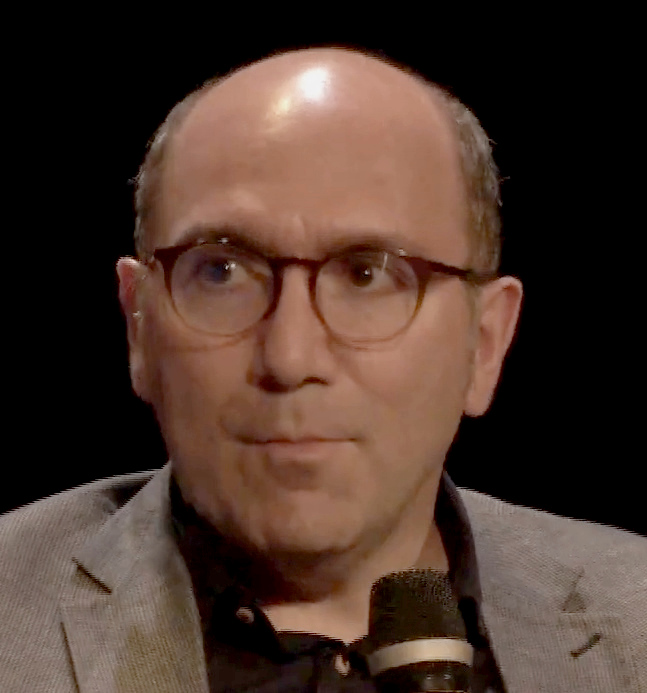
- Demirdjian in 2019

Alexis Demirdjian is a Canadian lawyer, currently serving as a Trial Lawyer for the Office of the Prosecutor at the ICC since 2015. He previously worked as a trial attorney at the ICTY's Office of the Prosecutor in The Hague. He was also part of the defence team of General Enver Hadzihasanovic between 2002 and 2005. He graduated from the Université du Québec à Montréal with a Masters in international law, after having completed his law degree (LL.B.) from the Université de Montréal. He is a member of the Barreau du Québec (Quebec Bar) since 2003.

== Professional experience ==
Throughout his career, Demirdjian has worked on several cases dealing with war crimes and crimes against humanity, in situations relating to leadership (both civilian and military authorities). In particular, in addition to working on the case of General Hadzihasavonic, he was part of the Prosecution trial team (at the ICTY) in the Vukovar 3 case (Mile Mrksic, Veselin Sljivancanin and Miroslav Radic), Bosnia and Herzegovina (Minister of Interior of the Serb Republic, Mico Stanisic, as well as his regional chief, Stojan Zupljanin) and Croatia (case of Goran Hadzic, Croatian Serb political leader). Since 2015, he's been part of the Prosecution trial team in the case of Laurent Gbagbo and Charles Blé Goudé at the International Criminal Court.

== Publications ==
Demirdjian has published articles about topics dealing with international criminal law procedure as well as on the Armenian genocide. He edited and co-authored an interdisciplinary volume called The Armenian Genocide Legacy for the centennial anniversary of the Armenian genocide. The book was published by Palgrave Macmillan in November 2015. At the same time, Demirdjian organized an international conference to discuss the papers contained in the book which was hosted in The Hague on 5–7 March 2015.

On the same topic, Demirdjian published an article in 2018 in the Journal of International Criminal Justice entitled "A Moving Defence: The Turkish State and the Armenian Genocide" dealing with the policy of denial of the Turkish government since the genocide of 1915 until present day.

Demirdjian has also published on the issue of State cooperation with international tribunals, converting part of his Masters thesis in an article published by the International Criminal Law Quarterly in 2010, entitled "Armless Giants: Cooperation, State Responsibility and Suggestions for the ICC Review Conference".

Demirdjian published a 2005 paper with Rodney Dixon, a member of Association of Defence Counsel of the ICTY, about plea-bargaining at the ICTY, where they noted that defense attorneys advising clients must be extremely resourceful in exploring all possible grounds for mitigation given the broad discretionary powers of the Trial Chambers. They noted that sentence reductions were unlikely due to the serious nature of the crimes brought before the Trial Chambers, adding that in most cases, the Trial Chambers would follow the recommendations of the OTP. They identified several key "mitigating circumstances" including the resources of the tribunal, protecting the interests of the victims and a genuine admission of guilt.

== Teaching ==
Since 2011, Demirdjian has been teaching on an annual basis international criminal law, in particular on the topic of "modes of liability" during summer course programs organized by Leiden University's The Hague campus and the Asser Institute.

As of January 2019, Demirdjian is an adjunct professor at Stockton University's School of General Studies and teaches - as part of the Masters of Arts in Holocaust and Genocide - a full semester online course entitled "Genocide, International Tribunals and Courts".
