= Dəmirçilər, Qazax =

Dəmirçilər
- Municipality
- Location within Azerbaijan
- Coordinates: 41°05′16″N 45°15′53″E
- Country: Azerbaijan
- Rayon: Qazakh

Population
  - Total: 1,341
- Time zone: UTC+4 (AZT)
  - Summer (DST): UTC+5 (AZT)

Dəmirçilər (also, Damirchilyar, Damirchilar, Demirchilar, and Demirchilyar) is a village and municipality in the Qazax District of Azerbaijan. It has a population of 1,341.
