= List of sculptures by Gürdal Duyar =

External image
- Bust of İdil Biret, in an article of Hürriyet newspaper.

This article lists a selection of works created by Gürdal Duyar.

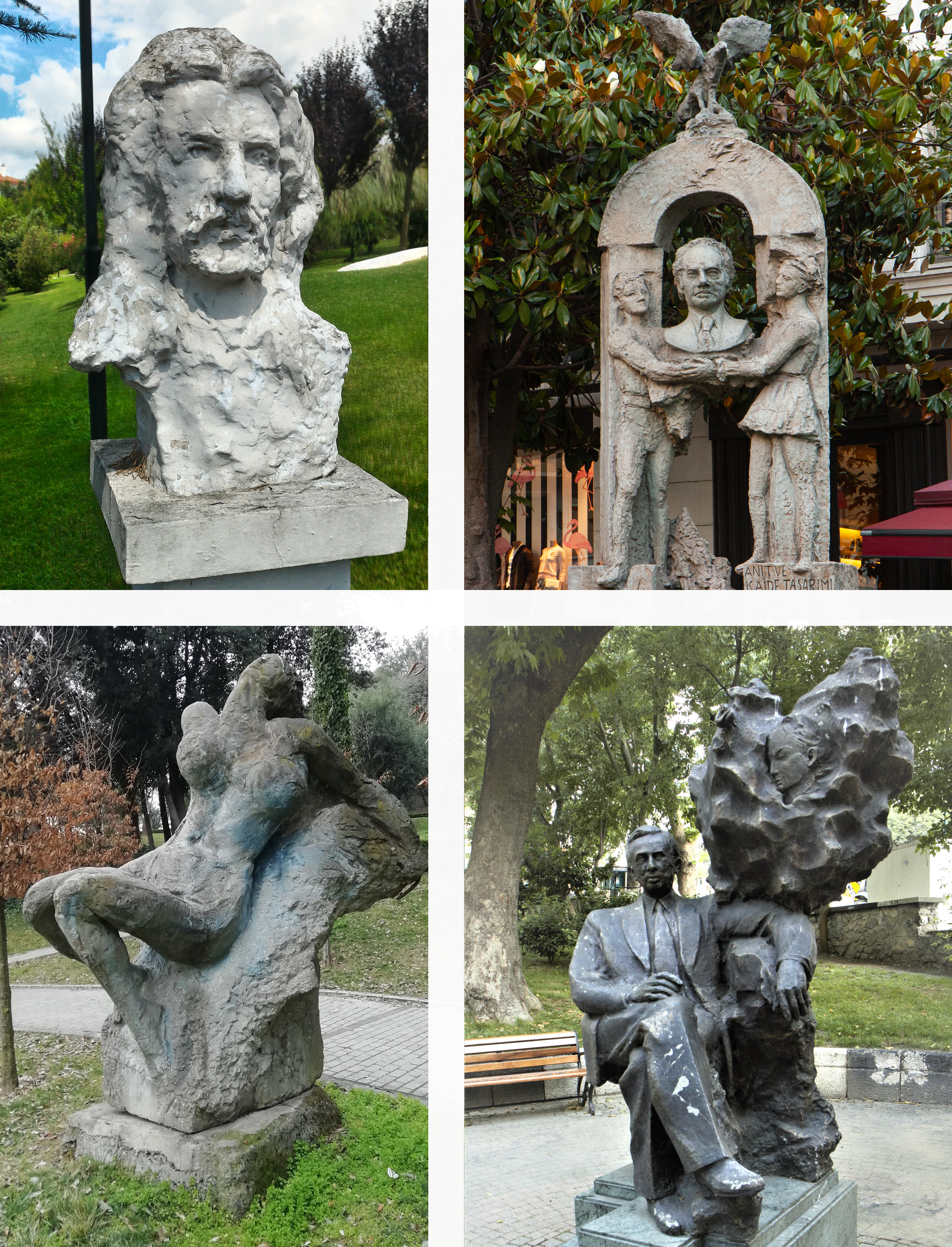
Sculptures by Gürdal Duyar

== Sculptures ==
Image	Name	Type	Location(s) (Note: including last known locations)	Date	Medium	Ref(s)
	Bust of Kuzgun Acar	Bust	Sanatçılar Park			(Note: date of the opening of the park)
	Güzel İstanbul ('Beautiful Istanbul')	Nude	Karaköy Square (10 March – 18 March 1974); Yıldız Park (3 May 1974 – present)	1974	Concrete	
	Bust of Barış Manço	Bust	Sanatçılar Park			(Note: erected with the opening of the park)
	Kadın Başı (Womans' head)	Bust	İstanbul State Art and Sculpture Museum	1952	Plaster	
	Bilge’nin portresi (Portrait of Bilge)		İstanbul State Art and Sculpture Museum		Plaster	
	Bust of İdil Biret	Bust	Dr. Baha Toygar Collection	1987		
External image: Uşak Atatürk Monument, uploaded to English Wikipedia.; External image: Uşak Atatürk Monument, postcard uploaded to Facebook.	Uşak Atatürk Monument	Monument	Uşak railway station	1965		
	Bust of Kemal Sunal	Bust	Sanatçılar Park			(Note: date of the opening of the park)
	Bust of Sadri Alışık	Bust	Sanatçılar Park			(Note: date of the opening of the park)
	Bust of Bedia Muvahhit	Bust	Sanatçılar Park	1980		
	Abdi İpekçi Peace Monument	Monument	Abdi İpekçi Street	2000	Bronze	
External image: Bust of Sait Faik Abasıyanık, in a photo by Kayhan Kaygusuz on a webpage of galaksi.anasonisleri.com.	Bust of Sait Faik Abasıyanık	Bust	Original mould: Dr. Baha Toygar Collection	1987	Plaster	
External image: Bust of Sait Faik Abasıyanık, in a photo by Kayhan Kaygusuz on a webpage of galaksi.anasonisleri.com.	Bust of Sait Faik Abasıyanık	Bust	Erected: Sait Faik Abasıyanık Museum	1987		
	Türkan Şoray Sculpture		Sanatçılar Park			(Note: date of the opening of the park)
	Şairler Sofası		Şairler Sofası Park	1998		
	Necati Cumalı	Monument	Şairler Sofası Park	2002		
External image: Figure by Gürdal Duyar, on the Sanat Mezat website.	Figure	Nude	Sanat Mezat Müzayedecilik			
External image: Figure by Gürdal Duyar, on the Sanat Mezat website.	Figure	Nude	Sanat Mezat Müzayedecilik			
External image: Kadın by Gürdal Duyar, on the Sancak Müzayede website.	Kadın	Nude	Sancak Müzayede	1999	Bronze	
External image: Süvari Atatürk Anıtı, uploaded to English Wikipedia.; External image: Süvari Atatürk Anıtı, uploaded to English Wikipedia.	Süvari Atatürk Anıtı ('Mounted Atatürk Monument')	Monument	Kültürpark,Kayseri	1974		
	Turkish War of Independence	Monument	Kayseri Square	1976		
External image: Figure by Gürdal Duyar, on the Alif Art website.	Figure	Nude			Bronze	
	Bust of Atatürk	Bust	Düzce	1962		
External image: Meçhul Asker anıtı in (Elibal 1973, p. 293), uploaded to English Wikipedia.	Meçhul Asker Anıtı; Monument to the Unknown Soldier	Monument	Uşak	1964		
External image: 1974 Photo of the Burhaniye Atatürk Monument in an archive by Salt Research.	Burhaniye Atatürk Monument	Monument	Burhaniye	1967	Bronze	
External image: A postcard of the Atatürk ve Madencilik Anıtı, on the efemeraturk website.	Atatürk ve Madencilik Anıtı; Atatürk and Mining Monument	Monument	MTA, Ankara	1971	Stone	
	İskenderun Ataturk Monument	Monument	İskenderun	1972	Bronze	
	Alaşehir Ataturk Monument	Monument	Alaşehir	1967	Bronze	
External image: Nü sculpture by Gürdal Duyar, on the Artium Modern website.	Nü; Nude	Nude	Artium Modern		Cement	
External image: Bust of Remzi Erişkin, in an Halkın Habercisi news article.	Bust of Remzi Erişkin	Bust				
External image: İsimsiz (Diptik), in the foundation collection of SantralIstanbul.	Untitled Diptych	Nude	SantralIstanbul			
External image: Kemal Özkan sculpture, uploaded by Gizem S. to FourSquare.	Kemal Özkan Circumcision Monument	Monument	Kemal Özkan Sünnet Sarayı; Konaklar, Meşeli Sok. No:25	1984		
External image: Bust of İsmail Dümbüllü, in a Diken article.	Bust of İsmail Dümbüllü	Bust	Kent Oyuncuları Foyer			
External image: Nude Figure, on the Alif art website.	Figure	Nude			Bronze	
External image: Terracotta nude, on the ART Point website.	Nü; Nude	Nude	ART Point Auctionhouse		Terracotta	
	Atatürk Mask	Mask	Gülhane Hospital	1971		
	Borazan İsmail Monument	Monument	Burhaniye	~1972		
External image: Clay Bust of Tevfik İhtiyar, in (Kaygın 2000, p. 2), uploaded to Gyazo.	Bust of Tevfik İhtiyar	Bust				
External image: Bust of Tevfik İhtiyar, (Aydoğan 2004, p. 26), uploaded to Gyazo.	Bust of Tevfik İhtiyar	Bust				
External image: Kompozisyon by Gürdal Duyar, in (Kaygın 2000, p. 21), uploaded to Gyazo.	Kompozisyon (Composition)	Nude	Antik Art Gallery			
External image: Figürin in (Kaygın 2000, p. 22) uploaded to Gyazo.	Figürin (Figurine)	Figurine	Antik Art Gallery			
External image: Kompozisyon in (Kaygın 2000, p. 23), uploaded to Gyazo.	Kompozisyon (Composition)	Nude	Antik Art Gallery			
External image: Kompozisyon in (Kaygın 2000, p. 24), uploaded to Gyazo.	Kompozisyon (Composition)	Nude	Antik Art Gallery			
External image: Ayfer Karamani’nin büstü uploaded by Karamani Ceramic Studio to Instagram.	Bust of Ayfer Karamani	Bust	Karamani Ceramic Studio	1980s		
External image: Bust of Gunnar Ekelöf, on the ekelut.dk website.	Bust of Gunnar Ekelöf	Bust	Swedish Research Institute			
External image: Zeki Muren uploaded by Murat Aybey to Instagram.	Bust of Zeki Müren	Bust				
External image: Işık Lisesi Ataturk kompozisyon uploaded by Murat Aybey to Instagram.	Özel Işık Lisesi Atatürk Monument	Relief	FMV Özel Işık Lisesi	1997		
External image: Bedri Rahmi Eyüboğlu uploaded by Murat Aybey to Instagram.	Bust of Bedri Rahmi Eyüboğlu	Bust	Sanatçılar Park			
External image: Ibrahim Çallı uploaded by Murat Aybey to Instagram.	Bust of İbrahim Çallı	Bust	Sanatçılar Park			
External image: Sadri Alışık uploaded by Murat Aybey to Instagram.	Bust of Sadri Alışık	Bust	Sanatçılar Park			
External image: Emin Onat uploaded by Murat Aybey to Instagram.	Bust of Emin Onat	Bust	Sanatçılar Park			
External image: Füreya uploaded by Murat Aybey to Instagram.	Bust of Füreya Koral	Bust				
External image: Don Quixote uploaded by Murat Aybey to Instagram.	Don Quixote					
	Bust of İlhan Berk	Bust				
	Bust of Avni Arbaş	Bust				
	Bust of Mahmut Cuda	Bust				
External image: Nurhan Övman in (Özgentürk 1995, p. 36) via Gyazo.	Bust of Nurhan Avman	Bust				
External image: Seyrani Monument on the Develi.gov website.	Seyrani Monument	Monument	Aşık Seyrani Square	1976		
	Tüm Tiyatro Sanatçıları Birliği Gift					
	Bust of Franz Schubert	Bust	White Villa at Emirgan Park	1983		

== Paintings ==
Image	Name	Type	Location	Date	Medium	Ref(s)
External image: Özdemir Asaf Portrait, on the artam website.	Portrait of Özdemir Asaf	Portrait	Artam Antik, Istanbul	1979	Oil on canvas	
External image: Kedi, on the artam.com website.	Kedi (Cat)			1996	Oil on cardboard	
External image: Still life by Gürdal Duyar, on Nefs Müzayede website.		Still life			Oil on cardboard	
External image: Nü by Gürdal Duyar, on artam muzayedecilik website.	Nü (Nude)	Nude		1996	Oil on cardboard	
External image: Savarona on Bebek Bay, on Istanbul Muzayede website.	Savarona on Bebek Bay	Landscape		1987	Oil on plywood	
External image: Nude, on Art Point website.	Nü (Nude)	Nude	Unknown Private Collection	1991	Oil on cardboard	
External image: Nude with flowers, uploaded to Artium Modern website.	Çiçekli Nü (Nude with Flowers)	Nude		1985	Oil on canvas	
External image: Selfportrait, on the Artium Modern website.	Selfportrait	Portrait			Oil on cardboard	
External image: Still life, on nefs muzayede website.	Still life	Still life		1985	Oil on duralite	
External image: Still life, on Artium Modern website.	Still life	Still life		1982	Gouache on paper	
External image: Nude, on the Artium Modern website.		Nude			Oil on canvas	
External image: Untitled in (Kaygın 2000, p. 26) uploaded to Gyazo.	Untitled		Antik Art Gallery			
External image: Painting in (Kaygın 2000, p. 25), uploaded to Gyazo.	Painting	Nude	Antik Art Gallery			
External image: Painting in (Kaygın 2000, p. 25), uploaded to Gyazo.	Painting	Nude	Antik Art Gallery			
External image: Painting in (Kaygın 2000, p. 25), uploaded to Gyazo.	Painting		Antik Art Gallery			
External image: Painting in (Kaygın 2000, p. 26), uploaded to Gyazo.	Painting	Still life	Antik Art Gallery			
External image: Peyzaj uploaded by torokules to Instagram.	Painting	Landscape		1983	Oil on duralite	
External image: Saz uploaded by Nişantaşı Müzayede to Instagram.	Saz	Still life	Nişantaşı Müzayede	1967	Oil on cardboard	
External image: İkili Nü uploaded by torokules to Instagram.	İkili Nü (Double Nude)	Nude		1996	Oil on cardboard	
External image: Painting uploaded by torokules to Instagram.		Nude			Oil on cardboard	
External image: Building uploaded by Aşkın Önder to Instagram.	Swedish Building	Landscape	Galeri Eksen			
External image: Painting uploaded by Murat Aybey to Instagram.		Nude				
External image: Painting uploaded by Murat Aybey to Instagram.		Nude				
External image: Building uploaded by Murat Aybey to Instagram.	Building	Landscape				
External image: Still life uploaded by Murat Aybey to Instagram.		Still life				
External image: Painting uploaded by Murat Aybey to Instagram.						
External image: Painting uploaded by Murat Aybey to Instagram.		Nude				
External image: Painting uploaded by Murat Aybey to Instagram.		Nude				
External image: Painting uploaded by Murat Aybey to Instagram.		Nude				
External image: Painting uploaded by Murat Aybey to Instagram.		Nude				
External image: Painting uploaded by Murat Aybey to Instagram.		Nude				
External image: Painting uploaded by Murat Aybey to Instagram.		Portrait		2004		
External image: Painting uploaded by Murat Aybey to Instagram.		Nude		1996		
External image: Painting uploaded by Murat Aybey to Instagram.						
External image: Painting uploaded by Murat Aybey to Instagram.				1996		
External image: Wolf uploaded by Murat Aybey to Instagram.	Wolf					
External image: Landscape uploaded by Aşkın Önder to Instagram.	Maiden's Tower	Landscape	Galeri Eksen		Oil	

== Sketches ==
Image	Name	Type	Location	Date	Medium	Ref(s)
External image: Ça - front cover, uploaded onto Pinterest.	Özdemir Asaf; Ça	Book cover				
External image: Şiirin Lüzumu Yok ! book cover, on idefix.com.	M. Yılmaz Öner; Şiirin Lüzumu Yok!	Book cover				
External image: Sketch and poem, on the Istanbul Antik Sanat website.	Desen ve Şiir (Sketch and Poem)	Poem		1972	Rapido Pen on Paper	
External image: Portrait, on the Sancak Müzayede website.	Portre (Portrait)	Portrait			Pencil on paper	
External image: Portrait of a woman, on the Artium Modern website.	Portrait of a woman	Portrait		1961	Ballpen on paper	
External image: Hayalet Oğuz, in an article on the Tarih website.	Hayalet Oğuz					
	Yalçın Küçük	Portrait		1984		
External image: Portrait of Turgut Uyar uploaded by Tekin Deniz to Instagram.	Turgut Uyar	Portrait		1978		
External image: Aliye Erişkin uploaded by mucize1001 to Instagram.	Aliye Erişkin	Portrait				
External image: Boy with oud uploaded by mucize1001 to Instagram.	Boy with Oud					
External image: Vivet Kanetti Uluç, Ömer Uluç and Can Yücel drawing uploaded by Sanatatak to Instagram.	Vivet Kanetti Uluç, Ömer Uluç and Can Yücel		Ömer Uluç Archive			
External image: Portrait in Papirüs 1978 uploaded by Ayşe Nur Kocatopçu Akı to Instagram.	Portrait of Ayşe Nur Kocatopçu Akı	Portrait		1978		
External image: Sketch of Atatürk uploaded by Murat Aybey to Instagram.	Portrat of Mustafa Kemal Atatürk	Portrait				
External image: Cat uploaded by Murat Aybey to Instagram.	Cat					
External image: Woman uploaded by Murat Aybey to Instagram.						
External image: Doll and Iron uploaded by Aşkın Önder to Instagram.	Doll and iron	Still life	Galeri Eksen			
External image: Sennur Sezer uploaded by sanatinicinden to Instagram.	Sennur Sezer	Portrait				
External image: Uğur Bekdemir uploaded by Uğur Bekdemir to Instagram.	Uğur Bekdemir	Portrait				
