= Gürdal Duyar =

Turkish sculptor (1935–2004)

- Born: 20 August 1935; Nişantaşı, Istanbul, Turkey
- Died: 18 April 2004 (aged 68); Nişantaşı, Istanbul, Turkey
- Resting place: Zincirlikuyu Cemetery
- Education: State Academy of Fine Arts
- Organization: Turkish High Sculptors Society
- Known for: Sculpture, painting, sketching
- Works: Abdi İpekçi Monument (2000); Güzel İstanbul (1974); Uşak Atatürk Monument (1965)
- Movement: Republic Era Turkish Sculpture (Turkish: Cumhuriyet Dönemi Heykel Sanatı)
- Family: Neşe Aybey (sister)

Gürdal Duyar (20 August 1935 – 18 April 2004) was a Turkish sculptor who is known for his monuments to Atatürk and his busts of famous people. His art is characterized as having a modern expressionist style that is balanced with abstraction. He is considered one of the pioneers of modern figurative sculpture in Turkey. Duyar was also a painter and is noted for his sketches, but his best-known works are the public sculptures placed in Istanbul's parks and public squares.

Duyar was a student of Rudolf Belling and Ali Hadi Bara at the State Academy of Fine Arts in Istanbul. After graduating, he spent some time abroad. At the start of his career as a freelance artist, Duyar worked on sculpture, especially busts, in Belgium, France and Switzerland. He later returned to Turkey, where he became known for his Atatürk monuments, including his Uşak Atatürk Monument (1965). He made several more Atatürk monuments in Turkey and held the first exhibition of his work in 1968.

Late in his career, many of Duyar's sculptures were damaged, removed or lost; these include the controversial 1974 removal of Güzel İstanbul. Duyar was a member of the joined the Turkish High Sculptors Society and was commissioned for several works; these include the Borazan İsmail Monument (1972), Kayseri Atatürk Monument (1974) and Âşık Seyrani Monument (1976). Duyar exhibited his sculptures and paintings, both individually and alongside other artists. His later major sculptures are Şairler Sofası (1998), Abdi İpekçi Peace Monument (2000) and Necati Cumalı (2002), and many of his busts that can be found in Sanatçılar Park. Duyar died in 2004 in Istanbul at age 69.

== Early life and work ==
The sculpture Kadın Başı, exhibited in the İstanbul State Art and Sculpture Museum.

Gürdal Duyar was born on 20 August 1935 in Istanbul; he was the youngest child of Fikri Duyar and Nezahat Duyar (née Erişkin). His older siblings were Erdal Duyar (1927-1975) and Neşe Aybey (1930-2015). His sister Neşe became a well-known miniature artist who graduated from and later taught at the State Academy of Fine Arts.

Duyar attended the İstanbul Haydarpaşa School. After finishing middle school in 1951, he took high-school-level classes at the sculpture faculty of the State Academy of Fine Arts, which was possible due to a special government regulation. At the academy, which in now Mimar Sinan Fine Arts University, he was a student of German sculptor Rudolf Belling. In 1952, Duyar entered the high-sculpture division of the academy and studied in the atelier of Ali Hadi Bara. At the academy he also learned from Zühtü Müridoğlu, and İlhan Koman. When Duyar was 17, one of his sculptures was exhibited in the Painting and Sculpture Museum at Dolmabahçe Palace and at 19, he had a work exhibited in the State Painting and Sculpture Museum. He graduated from the academy in 1959 and became a freelance artist.

After finishing his studies at the academy, Duyar worked in Belgium, France and Switzerland for some time, sculpting busts and studying architecture. During this time abroad he developed his stonework skills while working with the sculptor León Perrin, a close friend of Le Corbisier. One of his works was erected on Paris' Place de la Concorde. One of his early major busts was a 1.5-metre (4.9 ft)-tall bust of Atatürk that was commissioned by the Düzce municipality in 1962. (Note: At the time, it was the largest bust of Atatürk in Turkey.) His early plaster busts Portrait of Bilge (Turkish: Bilge’nin portresi) and Head of a Woman (Turkish: Kadın Başı) were also exhibited at İstanbul State Art and Sculpture Museum.

== Career breakthrough (1963–1973) ==
The Uşak Atatürk Monument (1965) in its original location c. 1990. The sculpture has since been moved.

Duyar returned to Istanbul around 1963. (Note: The poet Cemal Süreya mentions that works of Duyar from the 1960s can also be found in the house of Nahit Hanım.) At that time, a campaign by the newspaper Milliyet was raising money to erect monuments to Atatürk in some provinces of Turkey. Duyar was the youngest participant in the competition to select the sculptors of these monuments. He was one of eight winners and was allocated to Uşak province. Duyar's design was an 7.5-metre (25 ft)-tall sculpture depicting a caped Ataturk with his left hand raised and right hand in motion.

Duyar's Atatürk monument was different from typical Atatürk monuments of the time, which were in a more-established academic style. The sculpture was erected on 10 November 1965 in the same park that also contains Duyar's Monument to the Unknown Soldier (1964). The Uşak Atatürk Monument was Duyar's first major commission. During the next decade, he was commissioned to create many similar monuments around Turkey. (Note: These monuments include: Burhaniye (1967); a bronze Atatürk sculpture for Burhaniye/Edremit, which was 3 metres (9.8 ft) tall. The sculpture was removed with a bulldozer some years after it was made.; Alaşehir (1967); a bronze Atatürk sculpture at Alaşehir is 3 m (9.8 ft) tall. It depicts Atatürk in civilian dress.; Atatürk Mask (1971) was made for Gülhane Hospital in Ankara and is 0.9 m (3.0 ft) tall.; Atatürk ve Madencilik Anıtı (1971) (The Atatürk and Mining monument) stands in the garden of the General Directorate of Mineral Research and Exploration (Turkey) in Ankara. The 3.50-metre (11.5 ft) stone sculpture responds to classic monumental sculpture ideals.; İskenderun (1972); Atatürk Monument for İskenderun is 3 m (9.8 ft) tall, is made of bronze, has a stone base and depicts Atatürk wearing civilian dress.) becoming well known as a sculptor of Atatürk.

Duyar's first personal exhibition was at the Taksim Art Gallery in 1968 and his second was held in 1970. He also participated in group exhibitions, including those organised by the Turkish High Sculptors Society, of which he was a member.

Monument to the Unknown Soldier (1964).

The Burhaniye Atatürk Monument (1967) before it was removed.

The Ataturk and Mining Monument (1971) in the garden of the MTA in Ankara.

The İskenderun Ataturk Monument (1972).

== Mid-career (1973–1987) ==
Güzel İstanbul (1974) on Karaköy Square in 1974, prior to its removal.

As the 50th anniversary of the Turkish Republic neared, celebrations were planned. Duyar, by this time an established sculptor and well known in Istanbul, was chosen as one of several sculptors to make works for the occasion. Duyar proposed a sculpture named Güzel İstanbul that would personify Istanbul as a nude woman whose arms would be bound by a chain, representing the defensive chain constructed by the Byzantines to close off the Golden Horn from the Ottoman fleet. The woman would be depicted breaking the chain, representing both the Ottoman takeover of Istanbul from Byzantine rule and the emancipation of women. The organising committee accepted the proposal and the sculpture was erected in 1974 in a public square in Karaköy.

The sculpture became the subject of heated debate due to its nudity, leading to its removal after nine days at the behest of a conservative faction of the national coalition government. According to Seyhun Topuz, this affair almost brought an end to the coalition. Güzel İstanbul was eventually moved to Yıldız Park where it is placed with its back towards the park and its face towards a wall in a damaged state. The Association of Turkish Sculptors organized a nude-centric exhibition as a protest against the removal of Güzel İstanbul.

The Mounted Atatürk Monument (1974) in its original location on Republic Square in Kayseri.

Around 1972, Duyar made a monument for the town Burhaniye to memorialise Borazan İsmail, a Çanakkale and Independence War fighter who had recently died. (Note: Burhaniye was saved from destruction by the efforts of Borazan İsmail during the Turkish Independence War. The sculpture was removed around 1992 by the mayor at the time.) A sculpture named Süvari Atatürk Anıtı (Mounted Atatürk Monument) was erected on Kayseri's Republic Square in 1974. It was covered in a tarp for years and was later moved to the Kültürpark. In 1976, Kayseri municipality commissioned Duyar to place a modern Atatürk sculpture next to the old Atatürk sculpture of the city. The sculpture depicted the War of Independence and incorporated a depiction of Mustafa Kemal Atatürk wearing a kalpak. Despite being appreciated at the time of its completion, it was found split in two, and was left in that state. (Note: Other sources state that it was removed in the mid-90s on the grounds that it was being damaged, or that it was removed in 1992 by civil authorities.) The same year, the mayor of Develi Mehmet Özdemir commissioned Duyar to make a sculpture of the Develi-born Turkish folk poet Âşık Seyrani. This sculpture was erected on 30 April 1976 in a park in front of Çarşı Mosque and became a symbol of Develi district. (Note: It stands 2.40 metres (7.9 ft) high, weighs 3,000 kilograms (6,600 lb), and cost 55,000 lira. During the renovations of the mosque and the park, the sculpture was moved to the old market square of Develi.)

Throughout the 1970s, some of Duyar's sculptures were moved or hidden following the removals of Güzel İstanbul and the War of Independence Monument in Kayseri, such as the sculpture of Tamburi Cemil Bey in Emirgan Park, which was removed at the behest of a manager; (Note: Several years prior to 1995, Duyar had made a sculpture of the composer Tanburi Cemil Bey, which should have been located at the White Villa in Emirgan Park. It was missing on his visit to the park around November 1995. It had been removed at the behest of a manager.) and the sculpture of Borazan İsmail in Burhaniye, which was removed at the behest of the mayor. Some of his earlier Atatürk monuments were also removed, such as his 1967 Burhaniye monument.

Duyar was involved in a 1980 design interventions for the Grand National Assembly of Turkey in Ankara as a jury member involved in the evaluation of the submitted proposals. (Note: Duyar was the only jury member from the field of sculpture. He was joined by the Architects Doğan Kuban, Ziya Payzın, Nezih Eldem, Sadun Ersin, and Interior Architect Orhan Akyürek; as well as calligrapher Emin Barın, painter Devrim Erbil and ceramicist Sadi Diren.)

Duyar continued to sculpt busts, such as one of theatrical actor Bedia Muvahhit; she had portraits painted before but had rejected offers to be depicted in sculpture. She accepted an offer by Duyar in 1980 and posed at Duyar's workshop in three-hour-long sessions. Muvahhit was also later gifted a sculpture Duyar was commissioned to make. (Note: Duyar was also chosen by Tüm Tiyatro Sanatçıları Birliği, a union of all Turkish theater actors, to sculpt a gift to the older generation of actors in appreciation of their efforts over the years. The sculpture was to be presented by the younger generation of theater actors at Istanbul Sanat Merkezi (Istanbul Arts Center).) Duyar also sculpted a bust of short-story writer Sait Faik Abasıyanık, which now stands in front of Abasıyanık's former house in Burgazada that is now a museum. Duyar's other busts include one of Franz Schubert that has decorates the concert hall of the White Villa at Emirgan Park since 1983, and a bust of İdil Biret.

In 1984, Kemal Özkan, a renowned circumcision doctor, commissioned Duyar to make a sculpture for the garden of a building in Levent, which was inaugurated on 18 September that year. In 1985, Duyar held an exhibition, displaying almost 30 years of his work including six drawings, 16 busts, 30 figures and 60 previously unseen oil paintings. Over the next few years, he held several other exhibitions and participated in group exhibitions.

== Later career (1987–2004) and death ==
In the late 1980s, Duyar discovered Emel Say, who was not yet an established artist. She had finished a painting of Maui by her mother Zehra Say, a famous painter who had been unable to finish the work due to Alzheimer's disease. When Duyar saw the painting at an exhibition at Çiçek Bar, he asked who had altered it. Say replied she had retouched it a little but Duyar replied; "it seems that you have been a painter all along". Duyar had a significant influence on Say's career, and hers and Duyar's works were exhibited together at the inaugural exhibition of Asmalımescit Art Gallery in 1995.

In 1995, Duyar's bronze sculptural relief of the poet Gunnar Ekelöf was placed in the garden of the Swedish Research Institute in the grounds of the Swedish Consulate General in Istanbul. (Note: In conjucntion with Duyar's work, a selection of Ekelöf's poems were translated into Turkish from French by Hüseyin Baş and published as Emgion Prensi İçin Divan in 2003.) Duyar initially did not want to make the sculpture but after visiting an atelier by invitation of the architect Erkan Güngören, he accepted the commission. The sculpture was originally located in the Çiçek Bar and was moved to the Swedish Consulate General. In 1997, on the 111th Anniversary of the Fevziye Mektepleri, an Atatürk monument by Duyar was inaugurated in the Nişantaşı Campus of the Özel Işık Lisesi school.

In 1998 Duyar sculpted Şairler Sofası for the Hall of Poets park within Vişnezade, which was opened that year. The sculpture depicts the poets Behçet Necatigil, Sabahattin Kudret Aksal, Cahit Sıtkı Tarancı, Oktay Rıfat, Orhan Veli, Neyzen Tevfik and Nigâr Hanım together. (Note: As of the day of the inauguration of the park, Duyars main sculpture was accompanied by those created by Yunus Tonkuş, and Namık Denizhan. The design for the park was done by Architect Erhan Işözen.)

In 2000, Şişli municipality commissioned Duyar to create a monument to the editor-in-chief of Milliyet Abdi İpekçi to be erected where the journalist was killed 20 years earlier. Duyar's 3.5-metre (11 ft)-tall Abdi İpekçi Peace Monument, a bronze sculpture on a 70-centimetre (28 in) granite base. It depicts two students—one male and one female—holding a bust of İpekçi, and above it, a dove on the top of an arch symbolizing peace. The municipality erected the monument on 1 February 2000 in Nişantaşı on what is now called Abdi İpekçi Avenue.

In 2001, Beşiktaş municipality commissioned Duyar for a sculpture to memorialize writer Necati Cumalı shortly after his death. The sculpture, which was sponsored by Türkiye İş Bankası, was to be placed in Şairler Sofası park. Duyar created a bronze sculpture of Cumalı, which was inaugurated in a ceremony in 2002 on the 81st anniversary of Cumalı’s birth. Cumalı's wife Berrin expressed her appreciation of the sculpture, stating Cumalı was "born again today". Akatlar İstanbul Artists Park was opened on 13 June 2003, and incorporates many of Duyar's sculptures, including busts of artists Kemal Sunal, Barış Manço, Sadri Alışık, Bedia Muvahhit and Kuzgun Acar.

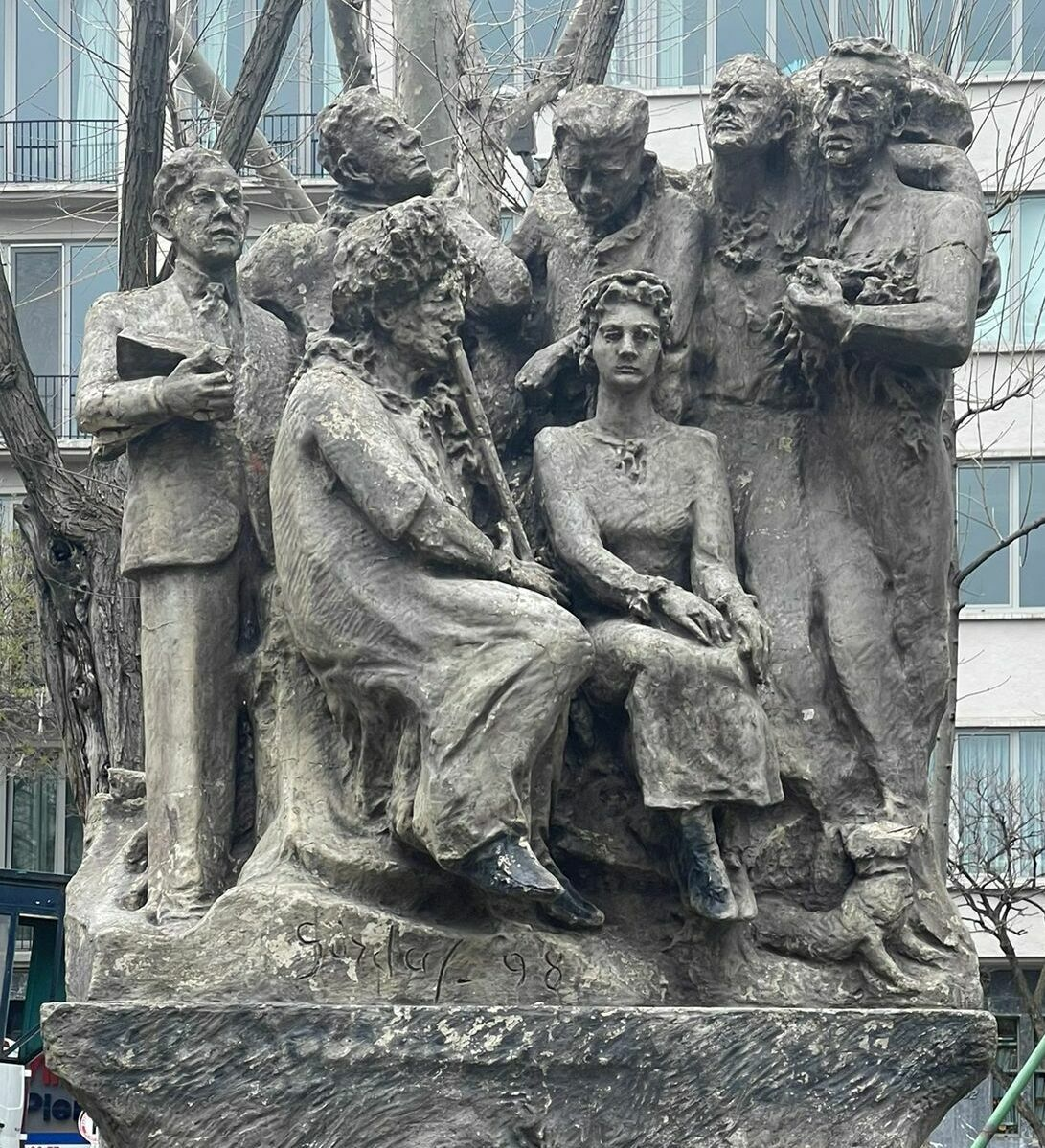
Duyar's Şairler Sofası (1998) in 2022

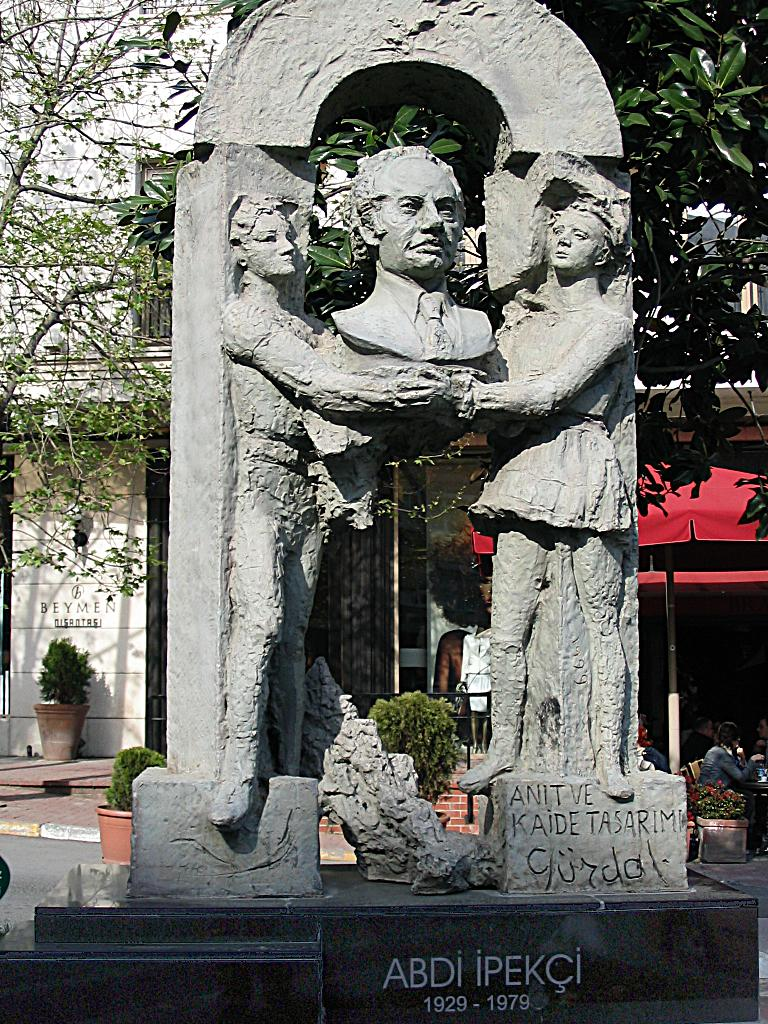
The Abdi İpekçi Peace Monument (2000) in 2006

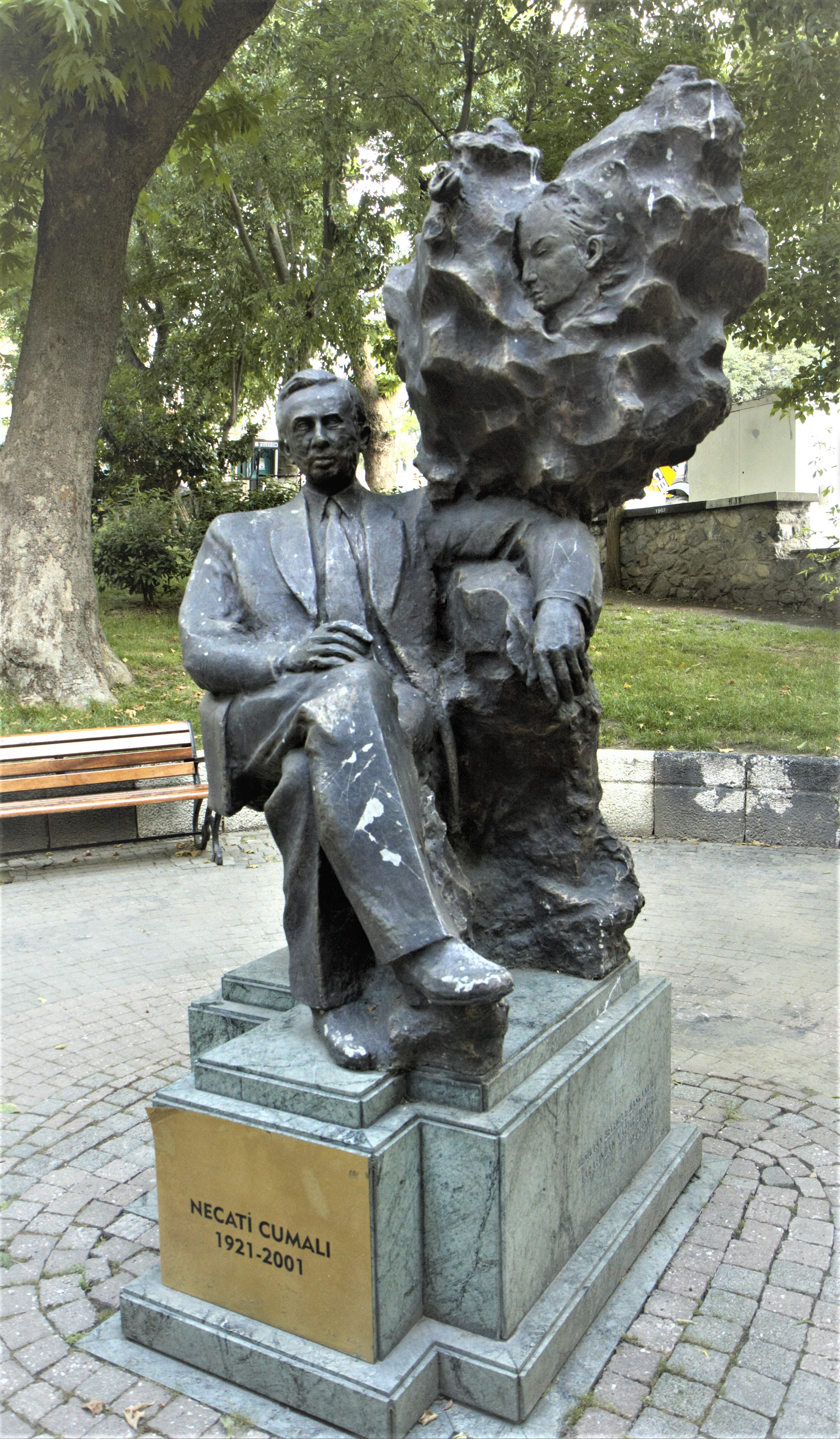
Duyar's Necati Cumalı sculpture (2002) in 2017

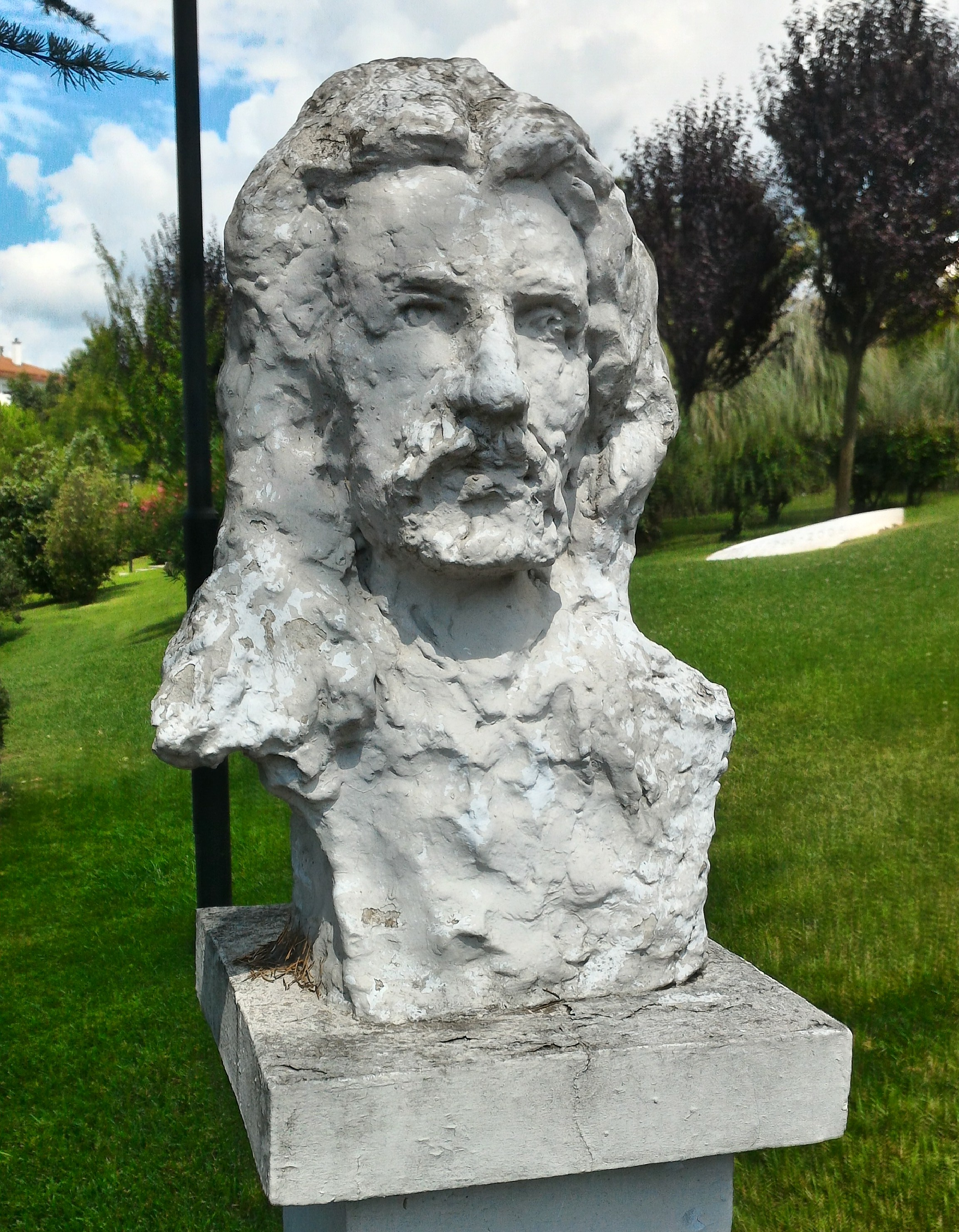
Duyar's bust of Barış Manço in 2019.

On 18 April 2004, after a month of treatment at the American Hospital in Istanbul, Duyar died due to lung cancer. The sculptors association organized a memorial ceremony for him in the morning at Vişnezade poets park in Beşiktaş. Then after the noon prayer at Teşvikiye Mosque, he was laid to rest at Zincirlikuyu Cemetery.

== Style and position in sculpture history ==
Duyar is a primary example of the Turkish school of sculpture, which was formed under the influence of Zühtü Müridoğlu and Ali Hadi Bara. This school saw the rise of abstractionism, and the use of non-classical tools and methods of sculpture. Duyar and his classmates, including Kuzgun Acar, Ali Teoman Germaner, Füsun Onur and Tamer Başoğlu, increased the dynamism of sculpture in Turkey and expanded its role in the art world. They are known as the pioneers of abstract sculpture in Turkey.

Duyar was well known for his monumental sculptures of Atatürk, busts and other sculpted portraits. He experimented with new techniques and sought to use the natural flow of his materials. His monuments were considered contemporary in style, in contrast with the more-widespread traditional monuments in Turkey. Duyar was talented in figurative sculpture, and his strong artistic ability was apparent in his drawing skills and was honed in his busts. According to critic Nebil Özgentürk Duyar "thinks with his hands and portrays his thoughts in with clay". According to fellow sculptor Hüseyin Gezer, Duyar was especially successful with busts. The character of the subject would be convincingly and expressively realized, and the busts would remain within the fluid boundaries of fine art. Duyar's ability to capture the character of his subjects and the balance in his compositions was noted by critics, some of whom described his work as expressionist. For figurative sculpture and busts, Duyar was lauded as one Turkey's top artists.

=== Drawing ===
Duyar's drawings have been treated as secondary to his sculpture but his talent was noted during his lifetime. Duyar sketched a lot, often late at night, and would leave the sketch behind. At Refik restaurant, which was frequented by poet Özdemir Asaf, Duyar sketched Asaf and left the drawing behind. The work was later used as the cover of Asafs book Ça. The cover of the book Şiirin Lüzumu Yok! by M. Yılmaz Öner and the cover of the 1984 Yalçın Küçük book were also sketched by Duyar.

=== Legacy ===
Duyar's legacy is strongest in Istanbul, where many of his sculptures continue to stand, and discourse continues around those of his works that were removed or damaged. The removal of the Güzel İstanbul sculpture remains controversial. Duyar influenced a generation of pioneering Turkish sculptors; he and his contemporaries introduced abstract and modernist concepts to the classical Turkish sculptural tradition. Duyar's influence was especially strong in monumental sculpture.
