= Turkish High Sculptors Society =

Art collective of Turkish sculptors

The Turkish High Sculptors Society was founded on 22 April 1948.

Turkish sculptors could not or had not become united to be organized professionally for a long time until the Sculptors Society was founded in 1948 as Turkish Sculptors Society (Turkish: Türk Heykeltıraşlar Cemiyeti) by Ali Hadi Bara, Nusret Suman, Yavuz Görey, Kamil Sonat, Hüseyin Anka, Ratip Aşir, Kenan Yontuç, Turgut Pura, Hakkı Atamulu and Burhanettin Durupınar. In 1961, the name was changed to Turkish High Sculptors Society (Turkish: Türk Yüksek Heykeltıraşlar Cemiyeti). Through those years, until at least 1974, the organisation continued to operate without being able to be recognised as a functioning and effective professional body according to some sources. Other sources have stated that the society has undoubtedly been a necessary organisation for the international art scene of sculpture and has become a large collection of artists that has even brought forth an important exhibition (1968) with the efforts of İsmail Gökçe, who was the president of the society for some time. Muzaffer Doğan Ertoran was also the president for some time.

In 1988 it was re-established in a second period by Ali Teoman Germaner, Namık Denizhan, Tamer Başoğlu, Berika İpekbayrak, Meriç Hızal, Rahmi Aksungur, Şahabettin Köksal as the Sculptors Society (Turkish: Heykeltıraşlar Derneği).

The Turkish High Sculptors Society organises exhibitions every year, supporting sculpture and sculptors.

== Known Members ==
- Namık Denizhan
- Füsun Onur
- Gürdal Duyar
- Şadan Bezeyiş
- Nermin Sirel

== Known exhibitions ==
- 1968 Sculpture Exhibition, Municipal Art Gallery Taksim, 1968
- Türkiye Yüksek Heykeltraşlar Cemiyeti, Taksim Art Gallery, (16 October - ) 1969
- Türkiye Yüksek Heykeltraşlar Cemiyeti, Taksim Art Gallery, (9 January - 25 January) 1973

== Sources ==
- ELİBAL, GÜLTEKİN (1973). Ataturk ve Resim Heykel (in Turkish) (1st ed.). Istanbul: İŞ BANKASI KÜLTÜR YAYINLARI 121. pp. 69, 234, 284, 291–292, 307.
- Alsaç, Birsen; Alsaç, Üstün (June 1993). "II. Bölum: Yontu. ii. Cumhuriyet Dönemi" [Section II: Statue. ii. Republic Era]. Türk Resim ve Yontu Sanatı [The Art of Turkish Painting and Statue]. Cep Üniversitesi 123 (in Turkish) (1st ed.). Istanbul: İletişim Yayınları. pp. 70–75. ISBN 975-470-341-8.
