= Uşak Atatürk Monument =

Sculpture of Atatürk in Uşak, Turkey

- tr: Uşak Atatürk Anıtı, tr: Hükümete 5 çay heykeli
- The Uşak Atatürk Monument in its original location
- Artist: Gürdal Duyar
- Year: 1965
- Dimensions: 7.5 m (25 ft)
- Condition: moved
- Location: Uşak
- 38°39′51.2″N 29°24′24.6″E

The Uşak Atatürk Monument is a caped Atatürk sculpture in Uşak, Turkey by Gürdal Duyar that was inaugurated in 1965. The sculpture was one of 8 Atatürk monuments erected after winning a competition initiated by a campaign of the Milliyet newspaper. It is one of the best-known early examples of Gürdal Duyars' style of modern figurative sculpture, and is one of Turkeys first modern figurative Atatürk monuments. It was originally created for its initial location on a high plinth in a park called government square in front of the governors building, but has since been moved to a new location onto a new-lower plinth near the Uşak railway station.

The Uşak Atatürk monument as appears pictured in Berk & Gezer (1973), p. 197.

== Sculpture ==
It was originally erected in a park in Uşak where Gürdal Duyars' Monument to the Unknown Soldier (1964) was also located. This was the same location as, or it was later moved to, the government square in front of the governors building. Its current location appears to be near the Uşak train station where it was moved to without its original plinth. The new, lower, base has a plaque with a quote from Mustafa Kemal Atatürk about the railways Demiryolu refah ve uygarlik yoludur meaning "Railways are the way of prosperity and civilization."

=== Style ===
The way that the Uşak Atatürk sculpture plays with mass and texture are important. It diverges from typical Atatürk monuments of the time which were of a more established academic style. It depicts a caped Atatürk with his left hand raised and right hand in motion. The monumental sculpture towers at 7.5 m (25 ft).

The spatial design around the area of the monument was designed by Erhan Demirok. Its original place was in the same park that also contains Gürdal Duyars' Monument to the Unknown Soldier (1964).

== History ==
=== Campaign ===
The Milliyet newspaper, following the coup of 27 May 1960, initiated a campaign to erect Atatürk monuments in 11 provinces where there were no Atatürk monuments.

The campaign succeeded in raising 429,856 Lira.

=== Competition ===
28 sculptors participated in the competition. Gürdal Duyar who was the youngest, was among sculptors including Hakkı Atamulu, Şadi Çalık, Hüseyin Gezer, Hüseyin Anka, Zühtü Müritoğlu, Mustafa Nusret Suman, and İsmail Gökçe to sign up for the competition. The competition went on from 3 March to 14 May 1964.

On 26 May 1964 the organisation of judges met at the Beyoğlu Development Institute. The jury, headed by Rudolf Belling was met with 29 design proposals. However they were met with 28 1 meter tall Atatürk sculpture proposals, and one bust by Gürdal Duyar. The jury decided unanimously that they would be choosing a sculptors and not their design proposals to be erected per se, and that the sculptor should be suited to the place that the given Atatürk sculpture would be erected, and that the sculptor would make a design based upon the surroundings of the place where the sculpture would be erected. The designs were reduced to 18 which were inspected and a further 10 passed onto the next round. Then the jury removed two more for only 8 sculptors to remain. Gürdal Duyars was one of the remaining 8. The results were that Nusret Suman, Hakkı Atamulu, Şadi Çalık and Zühtü Müridoğlu were selected unanimously and Gürdal Duyar, Hüseyin Gezer, İsmail Gökçe and Hüseyin Anka Özkan by a majority vote.

The jury then decided to move forward by giving these sculptors suggestions for the creation of the new designs.

Gürdal Duyar was allocated to Uşak, Nusret Suman to Bingöl, Hüseyin Gezer to Tunceli, Hüseyin Anka Özkan to Van, Şadi Çalık to Bitlis, İsmail Gökçe to Mardin, Zühtü Müridoğlu to Muş, and İsmail Gökçe to Giresun. The commission for the one in Giresun was given to İsmail Gökçes after the original sculptor selected to have their work sculpted in Giresun, Hakkı Atamulu, changed their mind about making the sculpture.

=== Development ===
The chosen sculptors then proceeded to travel to their allocated provinces to inspect the surroundings and environment of the locations that the sculptures were to be erected. They also observed the material and historical relevance of the locations and developed their designs accordingly.

=== Further examination ===
The state arts jury gathered for the first examination on 19 February 1965 to inspect the proposals. The proposals that were deemed appropriate were those for Tunceli (Gezer), Uşak (Duyar), and Muş (Müridoğlu). The proposals for Mardin (Gökçe), Bingöl (Suman), Bitlis (Çalık), Giresun (Atamulu) and Van (Özkan) were deemed inappropriate, and were given suggestions on what to improve.

At the second gathering of the jury on 7 April 1965 the remaining proposals were passed, and all the sculptors were given the go-ahead to create the life sized versions of their sculpture designs.

These life sized sculptures were gathered in the garden of the Galatasaray High School and were again inspected by a jury on 15 June 1965. The jury accepted the design for Tunceli (Gezer), rejected the design for Giresun (Atamulu) and provided further suggestions for the remaining proposals.

The remaining sculptures were again inspected on 23 June 1965 and were accepted.

=== Erection ===
Gürdal Duyar's Uşak Atatürk Monument was erected on 10 November 1965, and the other sculptures were also erected through 1965 and 1966.

=== Reception ===
The Uşak Atatürk Monument was Duyar's first major breakthrough on the road to gaining recognition as an established sculptor.

The sculpture became known colloquially as the hükümete 5 çay heykeli because of a phrase Atatürk had said when he visited Uşak.
