= Necati Cumalı =

Turkish writer of novels, short-stories, essays and poetry (1921-2001)

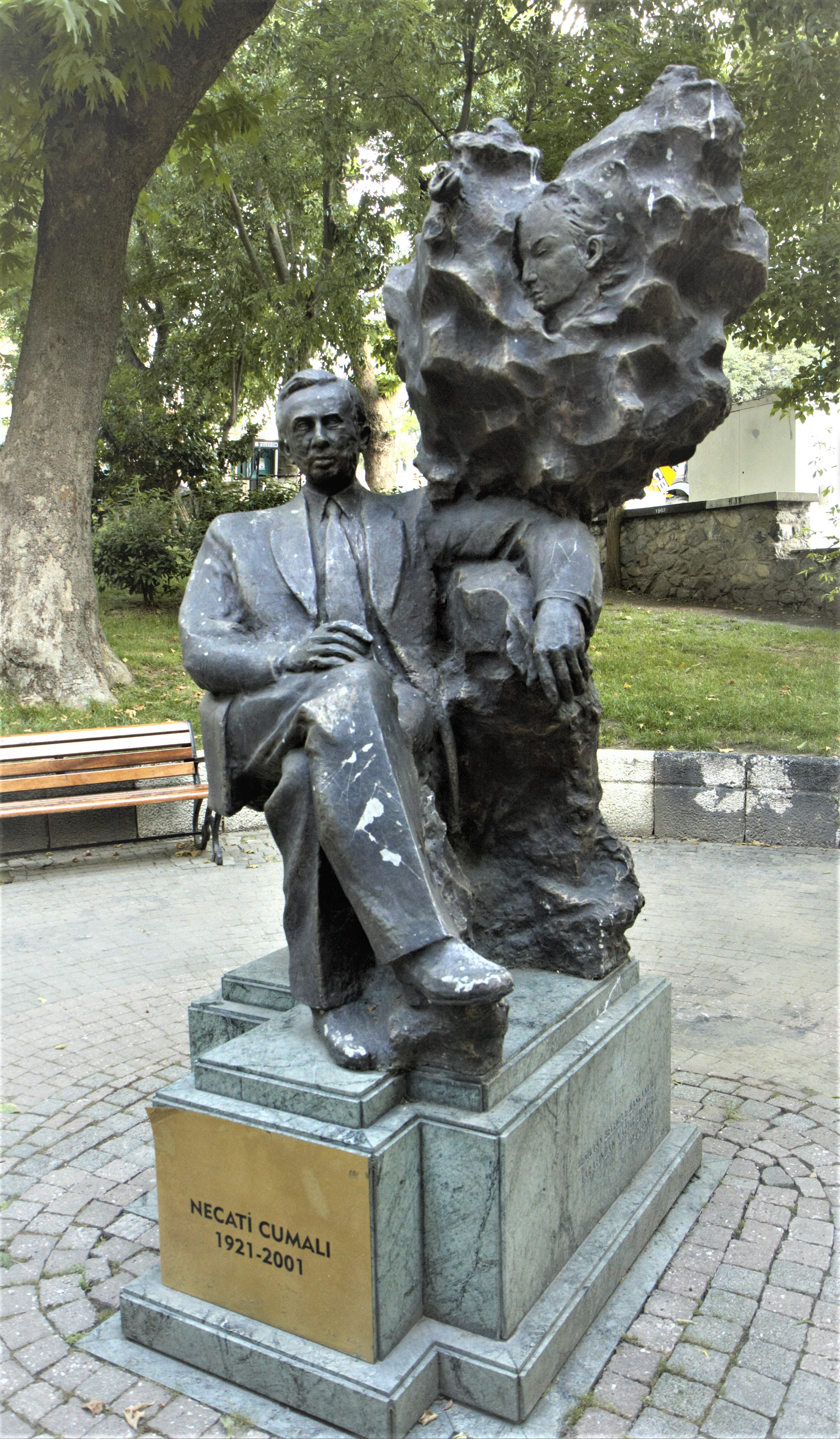
- A sculpture of Cumalı by Gürdal Duyar in Vişnezade Park, Beşiktaş
- Born: 13 January 1921; Florina, Greece
- Died: 10 January 2001 (aged 79); Istanbul, Turkey
- Education: Ankara University
- Occupations: Writer, poet

Necati Cumalı (13 January 1921 – 10 January 2001) was a Turkish writer of novels, short-stories, essays and poetry. He was born in Florina, Greece to a Turkish family who had settled in Urla near İzmir in the framework of the 1923 agreement for the population exchange between Greece and Turkey.

== Biography ==
He grew up in Urla and did his studied in İzmir. He started his law education at İstanbul University then completed it in the Law School of the University of Ankara. He started writing poetry while he was still a student and his poems were published as of early 1940s in such prominent Turkish literary periodicals as Varlık and Servet-i Fünun. Toward the end of that decade, while he was doing his military service, he also started writing short stories in which the profound influence of another important Turkish writer, Sabahattin Ali, could be felt. This, and the themes of social consciousness obvious in his works could be the reason for which he was sometimes cited in the same title as other "writers of the left", although he never actively engaged in political issues.

His vivid portrayal of women in his works was particularly noted.

Author of about 15 books of poetry, and that many books of short-stories and novels, as well as plays, Necati Cumalı died of liver cancer on 10 January 2001 in Istanbul three days before his 80th birthday.

His valuable collection of books was donated to Koç University after his death.

In 2002 a sculpture of Necati Cumali by the sculptor Gürdal Duyar was erected in the Şairler Sofası Park, a park in the Vişnezade neighborhood of Beşiktaş, Istanbul.

== Works ==
One of his best known works is the short-novel, "Dry Summer" (Susuz Yaz), adapted by the film director Metin Erksan to cinema in 1964, starring Hülya Koçyiğit and Erol Taş, and which won the Golden Bear award in Berlin Film Festival that year.

Another famous novel by Necati Cumalı is "Devastated Hills: Macedonia 1900" (Viran Dağlar: Makedonya 1900), where he relates the history of his own family which descended from a long line of Turkish Beys (Cuma Beyleri, "the Beys of Djuma"), with the turmoil in the Balkans providing the background. This novel has been adapted (not very faithfully) for the television by Michel Favart in 2001 as a multinational ARTE production under the title "Le dernier Seigneur des Balkans".

His poetry was translated into French by Tahsin Saraç. German Translations:Ö Der Mann aus Akhisar, Kitab-Verlag Klagenfurt, 2007 Des Balkans letzter Bey (Viran Daglar), Kitab-Verlag Klagenfurt, 2009

== Bibliography ==
- Sea rose: a play in three acts, Ankara: Ministry of Culture, 1991. ISBN 9789751708939, OCLC 26072810
- Çalıkuşu; oyun 3 bölüm, Reşat Nuri Güntekin'in romanından oyunlaştıran Necati Cumali. İstanbul, İnkılâp ve Aka Kitabevleri, 1963. OCLC 23550881
- Yalnız kadın: hikâyeler, İstanbul: Sander Yayınları, 1976. OCLC 977800156
- Aşk da gezer: roman, İstanbul: Çağdaş Yayınları, 1998. ISBN 9789757720249, OCLC 70234832
- Ay büyürken uyuyamam, İstanbul: Cumhuriyet, 2004. ISBN 9789756747100, OCLC 70276936

== Gallery ==
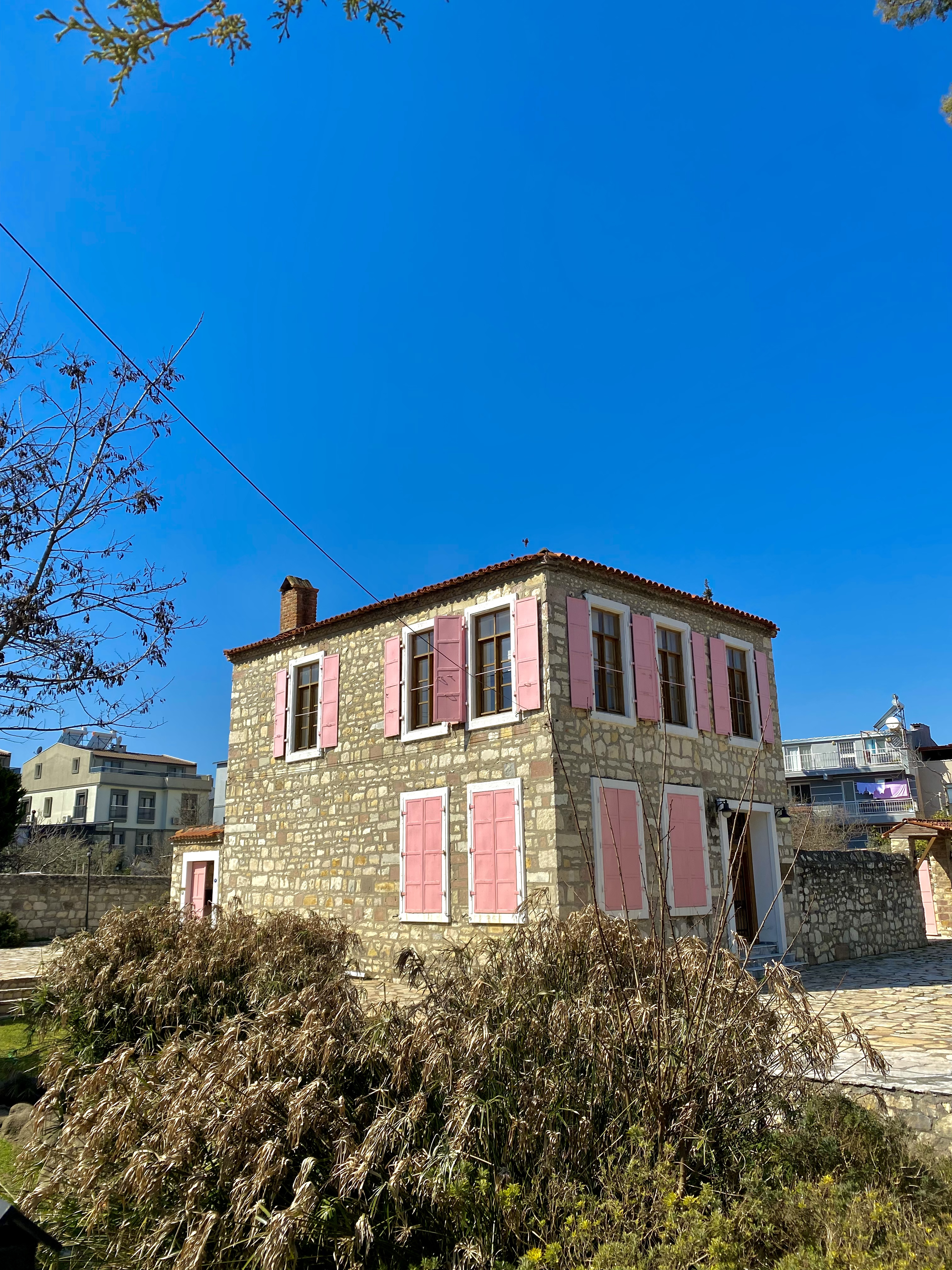
Necati Cumalı Memorial House located in Urla / İzmir

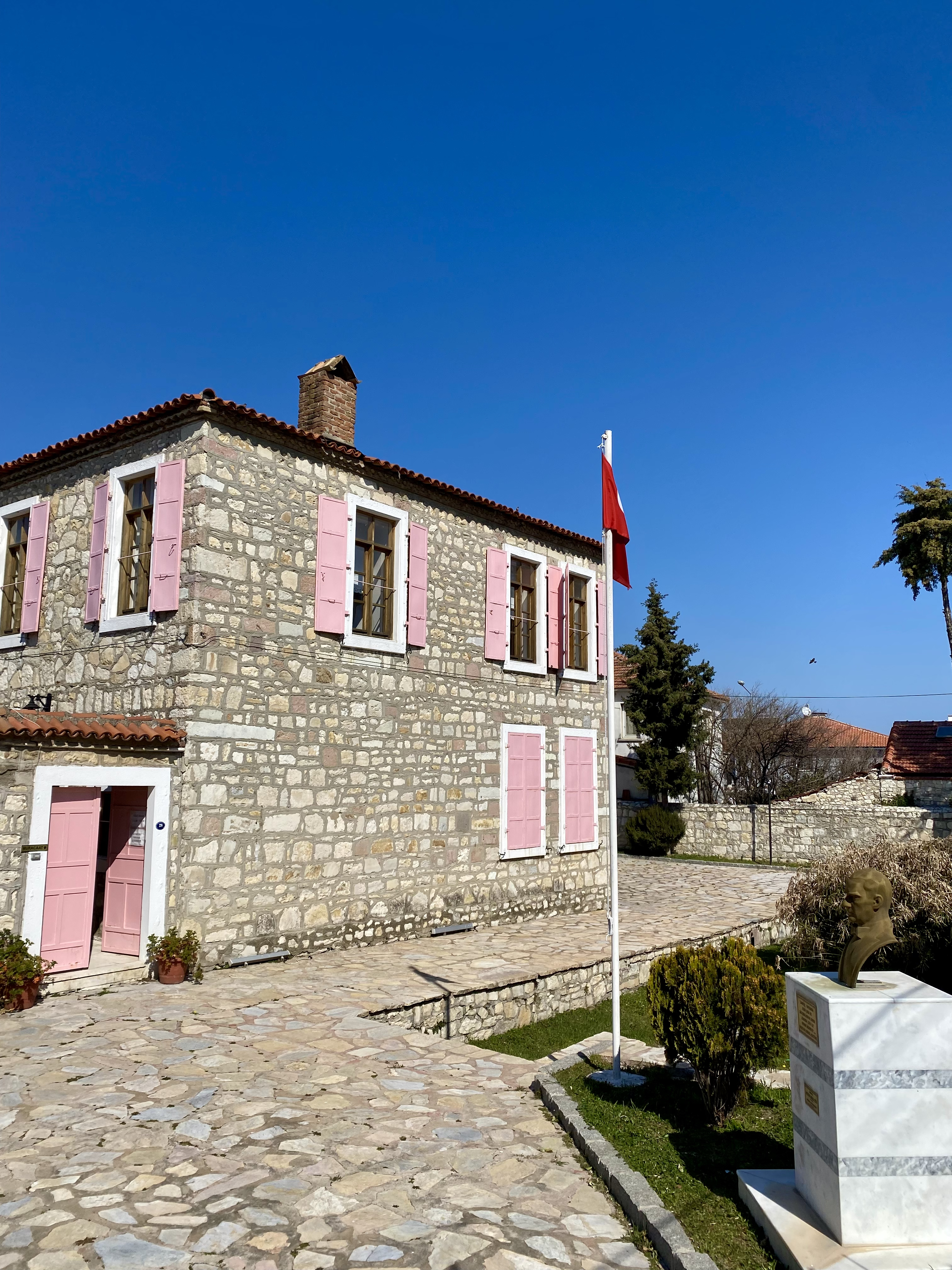
Front of the Necati Cumalı Memorial House
