= Ali Teoman Germaner =

Turkish sculptor

- Born: 1934; Istanbul, Turkey
- Died: 23 February 2018 (aged 83–84)
- Other name: Aloş
- Education: Istanbul State Fine Arts Academy
- Known for: Sculpture

Ali Teoman Germaner (1934 – 23 February 2018), was a Turkish sculptor. He is also known as Aloş.

== Life ==
He was born in 1934 in Istanbul. Between 1949 and 1954 he was educated in the İDGSA Sculpture Department in the studios of Rudolf Belling, Zühtü Müridoğlu and Ali Hadi Bara. In 1960 he went to Paris with a scholarship from the French government. Between the years 1961 and 1965 he could be found at the École des Beaux-Arts. He studied sculpture in the studio of René Collamarini and gravür in the studio of W. S. Hayter.

In 1965 he started teaching at the Mimar Sinan University Fine Arts Faculty sculpture department. In 1970 he became a docent, and in 1976 a professor.

After founding the academies serigrafi and gravür studio on the graphics department notable artists graduating from this studio became Alaettin Aksoy, Aydın Ayan, Hüseyin Bilgin, Gören Bulut, Gül Derman, Devrim Erbil, Güngör İblikçi, Gündüz Gönlönü, Mehmet Güler, Süleyman Saim Tekcan, Zahit Büyükişleyen, Erol Deneç, Nail Peyza, Ergin İnan, Utku Varlık, Mustafa Pilevneli, Hasan Pekmezci, Hayati Misman, Fevzi Karakoç, Hüsamettin Koçan, Atilla Atar, Ali İsmail Türemen, Kadri Özayten'in.

He died on 23 February 2018. His burial was at Nakkaştepe Cemetery.

== Art ==
In Ali Teoman Germaner's wood and bronze sculptures, unreal creatures and supernatural beings appear as products of a fantastic understanding of formation. The aim of creating new opportunities in the free form and free shaping of contemporary sculpture in Türkiye is the main determining factor of these works. There are 6 main figures in his sculptures: human, horse, snake, seashell, spine and incense burner.

== Works ==
=== Books ===
- Aloşnâme, YKB Sanat Yayıncılık, 1999 (Sketches).

== Awards ==
- 29. Devlet Resim ve Heykel Sergisi 56456
