= Nermin Farukî =

Turkish sculptor

Nermin Sirel Faruki(1904–1991) was a Turkish sculptor, and one of Turkey's first female sculptors. She was born in Istanbul. She received education in the Istanbul Academy of Fine Arts painting department and later at the Berlin Fine Arts Academy. Along with sculpture she also worked on paintings. Nermin Farukî was born as Nermin Faruki. Nermin Farukî was the daughter of the Ottoman Empires first perfume producers, Ahmet Farukî.

She was a member of the Turkish High Sculptors Society.

== Art education ==
When she was a student at Sanayi-i Nefise Mektebi (Istanbul Academy of Fine Arts), Nermin Farukî studied under the supervision of İhsan Özsoy. Faruki, later on, went to Germany and continued her studies there at Berlin Fine Arts Academy. At first, her work was mainly influenced by German neoclassicism, until she moved towards different fields, such as using copper panels and creating more abstract sculptures. During her time in Germany, Nermin Farukî studied alongside other Turkish artists who were in Germany between 1915 and 1930. One of these artists was her husband, Ali Nijat Sirel, who worked alongside Faruki on some of her artwork. Other artists she would have studied with includes: Mehmet Mahir Tomruk, Namık İsmail, Ratip Aşir Acudoğlu, Nurettin Ergüven, Kenan Temizan, Cemal Tollu, İhap Hulusi Görey, Belkis Mustafa, Ali Avni Çelebi, Zeki Kocamemi, Mahmut Cuda, Ali Karsan, Saip Tuna, Mustafa Nusret Suman, Fahreddin Arkunlar, Hakkı İzzet and Malik Aksel.

== Work ==
In 1950, İraida Barry, Nusret Suman and Nermin Farukî open an exhibition at the Friends of Art Society.

In 1957, Farukî opened her first solo art exhibition in Istanbul City Gallery. In 1956 the art piece she made for the Spring and Flower Day was honored with the first place award. At the Second Istanbul Festival she once again won the first place award for her artwork. Later in 1989 Pamukbank Nisantasi Art Galery of Turkey, held an exhibition called Nermin Faruki, Painting and Sculpture Art Exhibition. In the beginning her sculpture style was influenced by her German schooling with an emphasis on lighting and highlights in her busts. In her later works she placed abstract forms on copper plates.

== Sources ==
- ELİBAL, GÜLTEKİN (1973). Ataturk ve Resim Heykel (in Turkish) (1st ed.). Istanbul: İŞ BANKASI KÜL TÜR YAYINLARI 121.
