= Abdi İpekçi =

Turkish journalist, intellectual and human rights activist (1929–1979)

- Born: 9 August 1929; Istanbul, Turkey
- Died: 1 February 1979 (aged 49); İstanbul, Turkey
- Education: Galatasaray High School; Istanbul University
- Occupation: Editor-in-chief
- Years active: 1954–1979
- Spouse: Afife Sibel Dilber (m. 1956)
- Children: 2
- Relatives: İsmail Cem (cousin); Cemil İpekçi (cousin)

Abdi İpekçi (9 August 1929 – 1 February 1979) was a Turkish journalist, intellectual and human rights activist. He was murdered when he was editor-in-chief of one of the main Turkish daily newspapers Milliyet which then had a centre-left political stance.

== Biography ==
Abdi İpekçi was born in Istanbul, Turkey to a wealthy and respected Dönmeh family of Thessaloniki origin. After finishing high school at Galatasaray High School in 1948, he attended law school at Istanbul University for a while. He started his professional career as a sports reporter for the newspaper Yeni Sabah, and transferred later to Yeni İstanbul. In 1954, he joined the newspaper Milliyet as its publishing manager, and was promoted to editor-in-chief in 1959.

A respected journalist, he was a proponent of the separation of religion and state, and an advocate of dialogue and conciliation with Greece, as well as of human rights for various minorities in Turkey. İpekçi favored left-leaning causes and groups outside of the main secularist, center-leftist and Kemalist Republican People's Party. Known internationally as a political moderate, he continuously criticized the political extremism that fueled the violent polarization at the time before the 1971 Turkish military memorandum.

== Murder ==
On 1 February 1979, two members of the ultra-nationalist Grey Wolves, Oral Çelik and Mehmet Ali Ağca (who later shot Pope John Paul II), murdered Abdi İpekçi in his car on the way back home from his office in front of his apartment building in Istanbul. Ağca was caught due to an informant and was sentenced to life in prison. After serving six months in a military prison in Istanbul, Ağca escaped with the help of military officers and the Grey Wolves, fleeing first to Iran and then to Bulgaria, which was then a base of operation for the Turkish mafia.

According to reporter Lucy Komisar, Mehmet Ali Ağca had collaborated with Abdullah Çatlı in this 1979 murder, who "then reportedly helped organize Ağca's escape from the prison, and some have suggested Çatlı was even involved in the Pope's assassination attempt". Ağca later became famous for his failed assassination attempt on Pope John Paul II on May 13, 1981. According to Reuters, Ağca had "escaped with suspected help from sympathizers in the security services".

Writer and politician Çetin Altan, alleged that a journalist colleague who was a former admiral intelligence officer of the chiefs of staff, Sezai Orkunt, had informed him that the clandestine Counter-Guerrilla murdered İpekçi at the behest of the CIA's station chief in Turkey. İpekçi had learned that the counter-guerrilla were inducting civilians into a clandestine anti-communist organization without the knowledge of the Turkish chief of staff. He knew that the counter-guerrilla were subordinate to the CIA, whose station chief at the time was Paul Henze. İpekçi thus asked Henze to stop the CIA's illegal activities. Other sources also name Henze as the instigator of İpekçi's murder.

Abdi İpekçi was interred at the Zincirlikuyu Cemetery. He is survived by his wife Sibel, daughter Nükhet and son Sedat.

== Legacy ==
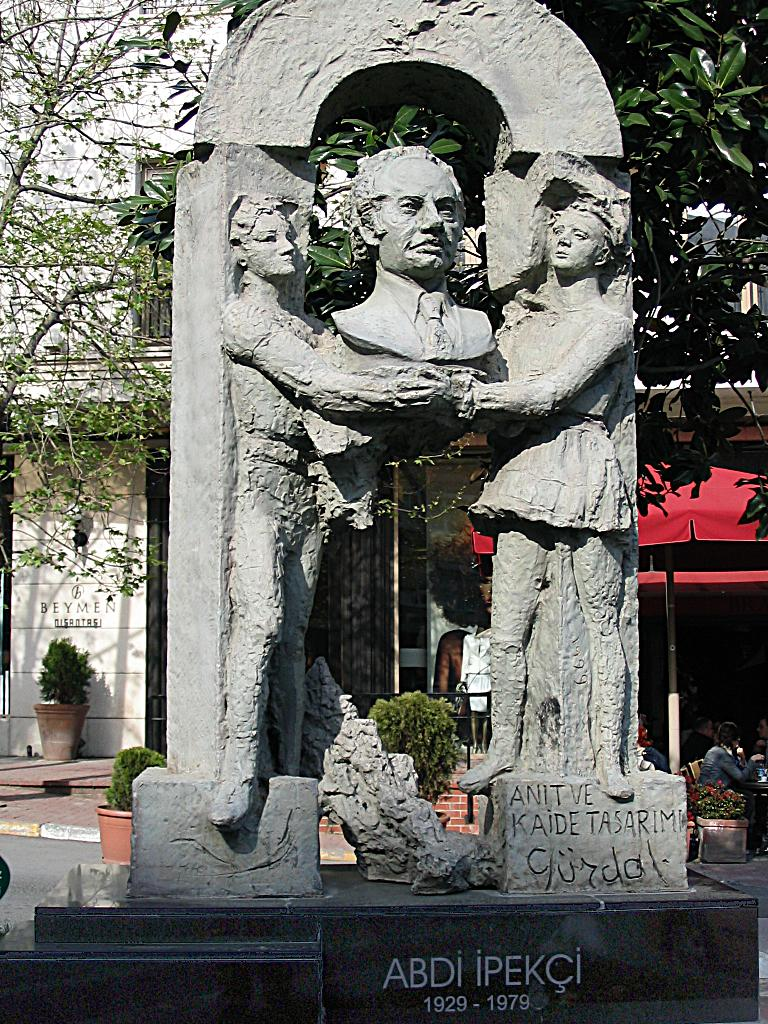
Abdi İpekçi Peace Monument

The street on which he lived and was murdered was renamed Abdi İpekçi Avenue. On 1 February 2000, a statue erected by the Municipality of Şişli near the place where he was murdered was unveiled in his commemoration. It was designed by the architect Erhan İşözen, and the 3.5 m high bronze sculpture created by Gürdal Duyar stands on a 0.70 m high granite base. The memorial depicts İpekçi's bust held by one male and one female student with a dove atop symbolizing peace.

Turkey's former multi-purpose indoor sports arena, the Abdi İpekçi Arena located in Istanbul, was also named after him.

The İpekçi Peace and Friendship Prize was established in 1981 to honor people who improved the relations between Greece and Turkey. The award is presented every two years on a rotational basis in Athens and Istanbul. Recipients have included the writer Dido Sotiriou in 1983 and the photographer Nikos Economopoulos.

In 2000, İpekçi was named as one of the International Press Institute's 50 World Press Freedom Heroes of the past 50 years.

== See also ==
- List of assassinated people from Turkey
- List of journalists killed in Turkey
