= Barbaros Monument =

Memorial in Istanbul, Turkey

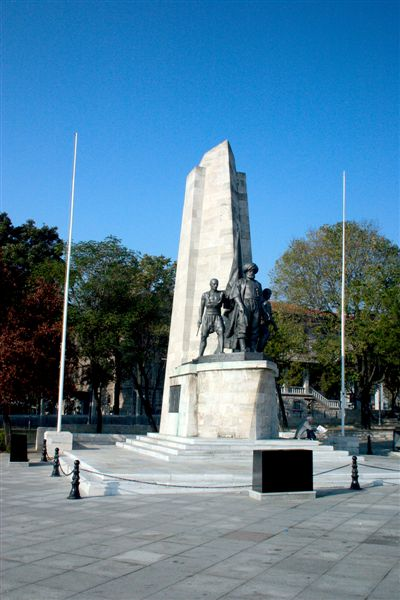
- 41°2′29.7″N 29°0′22.9″E
- Location: Istanbul, Turkey

The Barbaros Monument is installed in Istanbul.

== See also ==
- List of public art in Istanbul
