= Sanatçılar Park =

Public park in Istanbul

Artists' Park
- Etiler Sanatçılar Parkı Akatlar Sanatçılar Parkı; İstanbul Akatlar Sanatçılar Parkı; Cüneyt Arkın Sanatçılar Parkı Beşiktaş Sanatçılar Parkı
- Sanatçılar Parkı
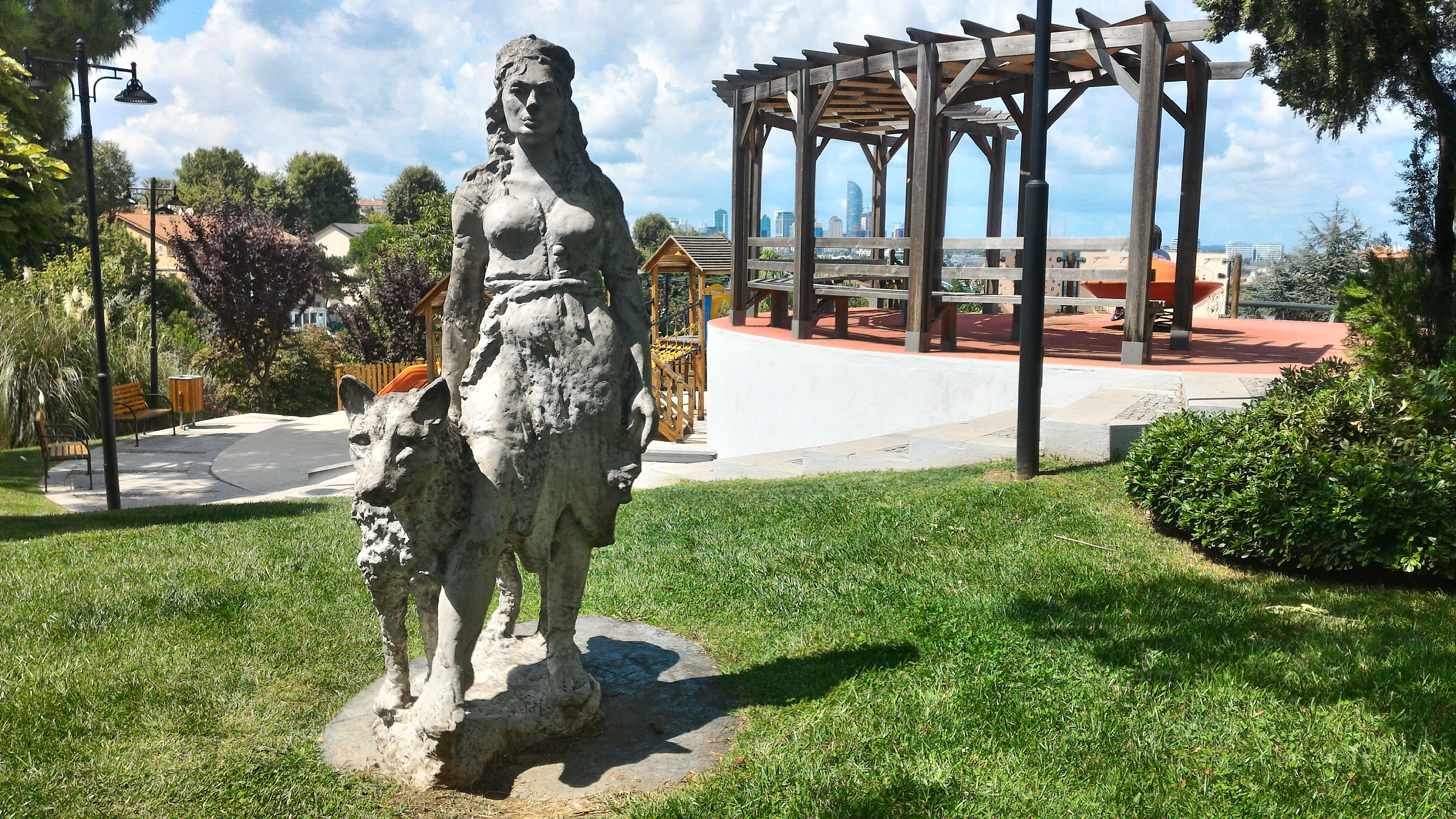
- A sculpture of Türkan Şoray, by Gürdal Duyar in the park.
- Interactive map of Artists' Park
- Type: Urban park
- Location: Akatlar, Beşiktaş, Istanbul, Turkey
- Coordinates: 41°04′57″N 29°01′46″E
- Area: 118.61 acres (48.00 ha)
- Created: 2003
- Operator: Beşiktaş Municipality
- Open: All year
- Website: http://en.besiktas.bel.tr/entry/sanatcilar-park/

The Akatlar Sanatçılar Parkı or Artists' Park is a public park operated by the Beşiktaş municipality in Akatlar, Beşiktaş. It is the home of many sculptures of famous Turkish artists and also hosts theater performances and other activities.

The park aims to show a piece of all 7 branches of art through the many busts and hand imprints of famous Turkish artists found inside the park. These include busts of Kemal Sunal, Barış Manço, Sadri Alışık and Bedia Muvahhit which were sculpted by Gürdal Duyar. (Note: At least 17 of the busts in the park are by Gürdal Duyar as of 2004.) The park also has a lot of green space and includes a 1500m2 running track and has other sports oriented areas. The park is free to enter.

In July 2022 the park was renamed to Cüneyt Arkın Sanatçılar Parkı in memory of Arkın who died June 2022.

The park was opened in 2003, is about 480 decare in size.

There is a cafeteria located in the park that is operated by the Beşiktaş municipality. It is known as the Sanatçılar Kafe and is open from 8 A.M. to 11 P.M.

On the 59th anniversary of the death of Nâzım Hikmet he was honored in a ceremony at the park where his poems were read.

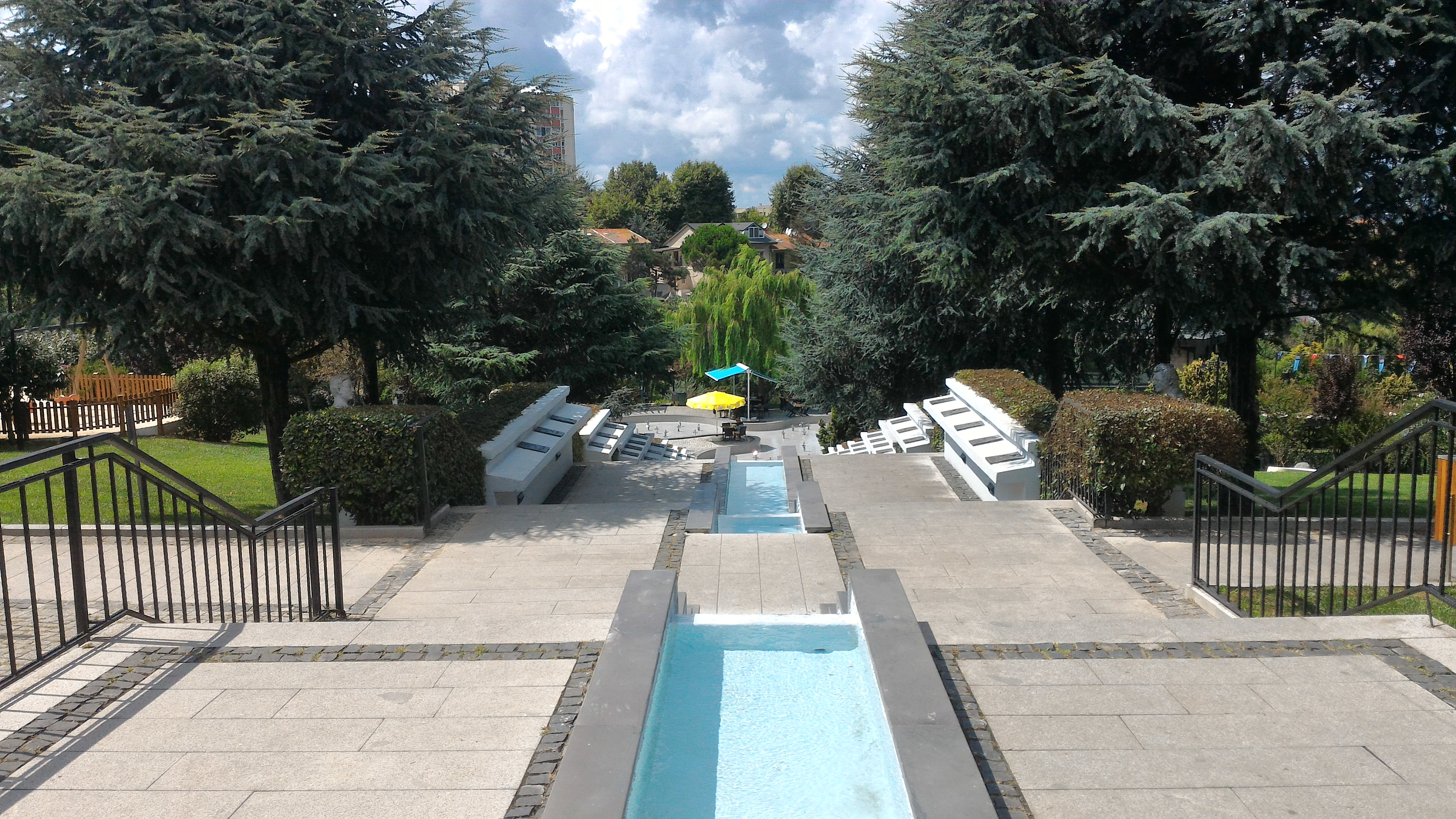
Entrance of the park

== Gallery ==
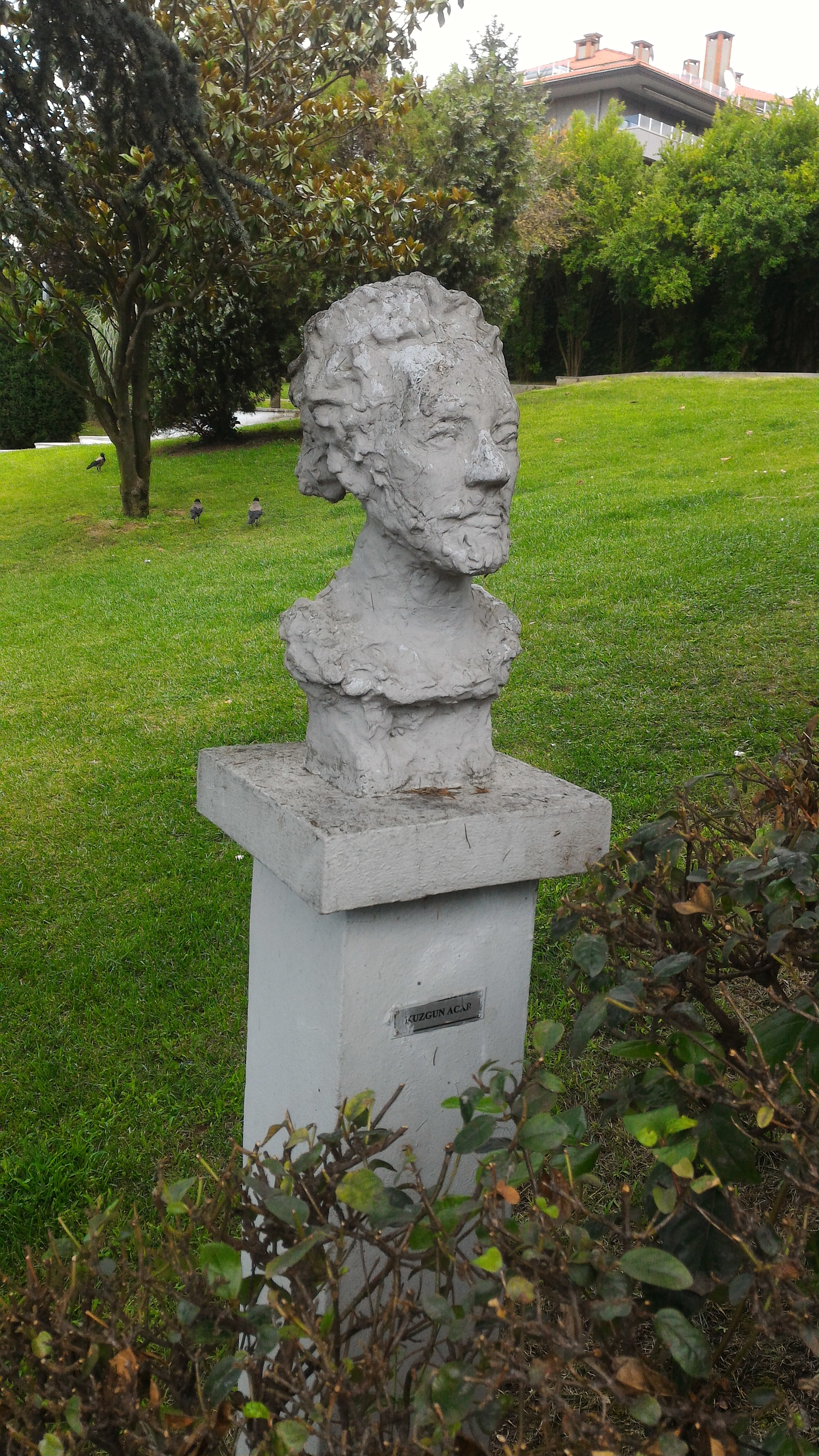
Bust of Kuzgun Acar by Gürdal Duyar

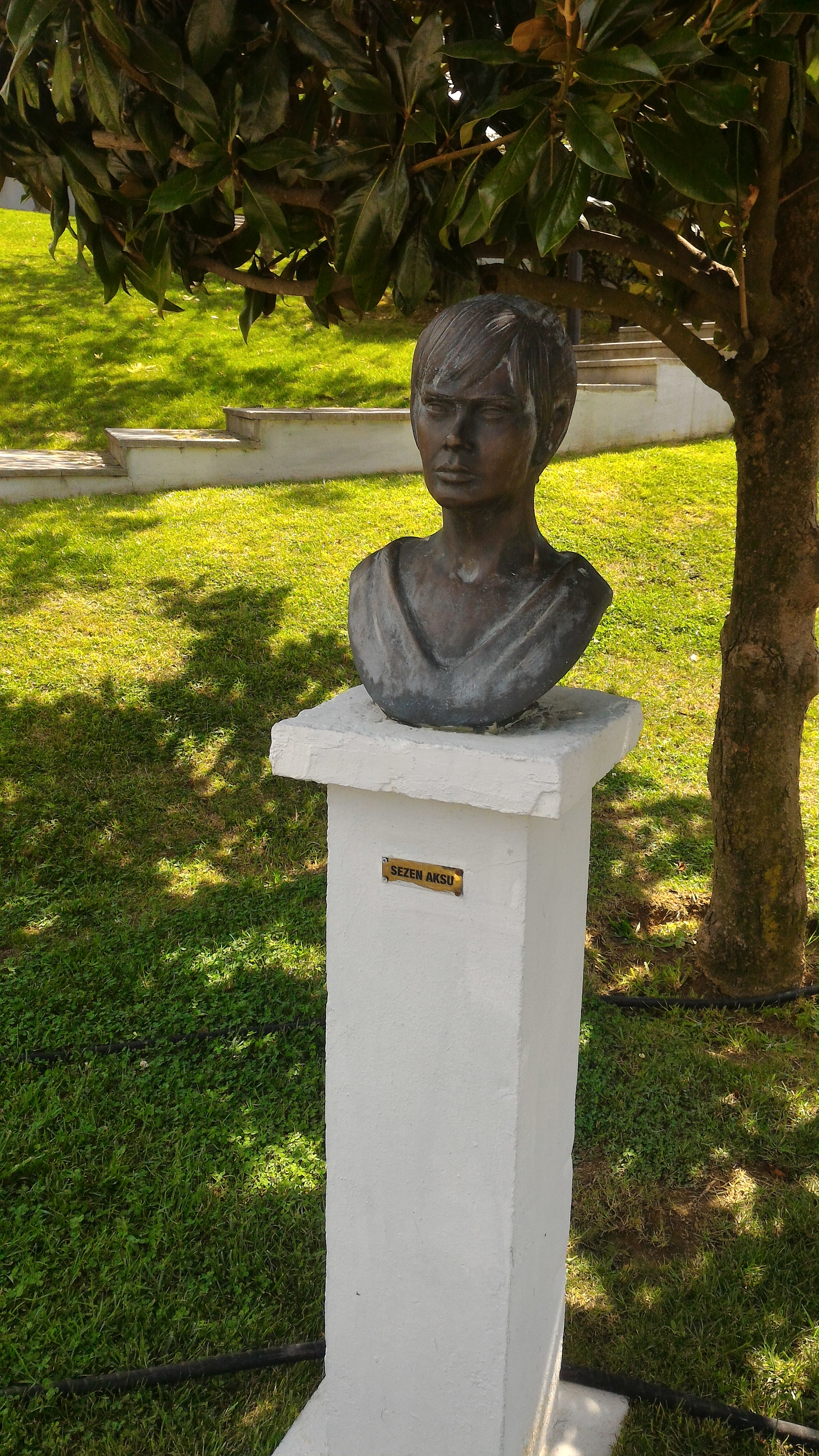
Bust of Sezen Aksu in the park.

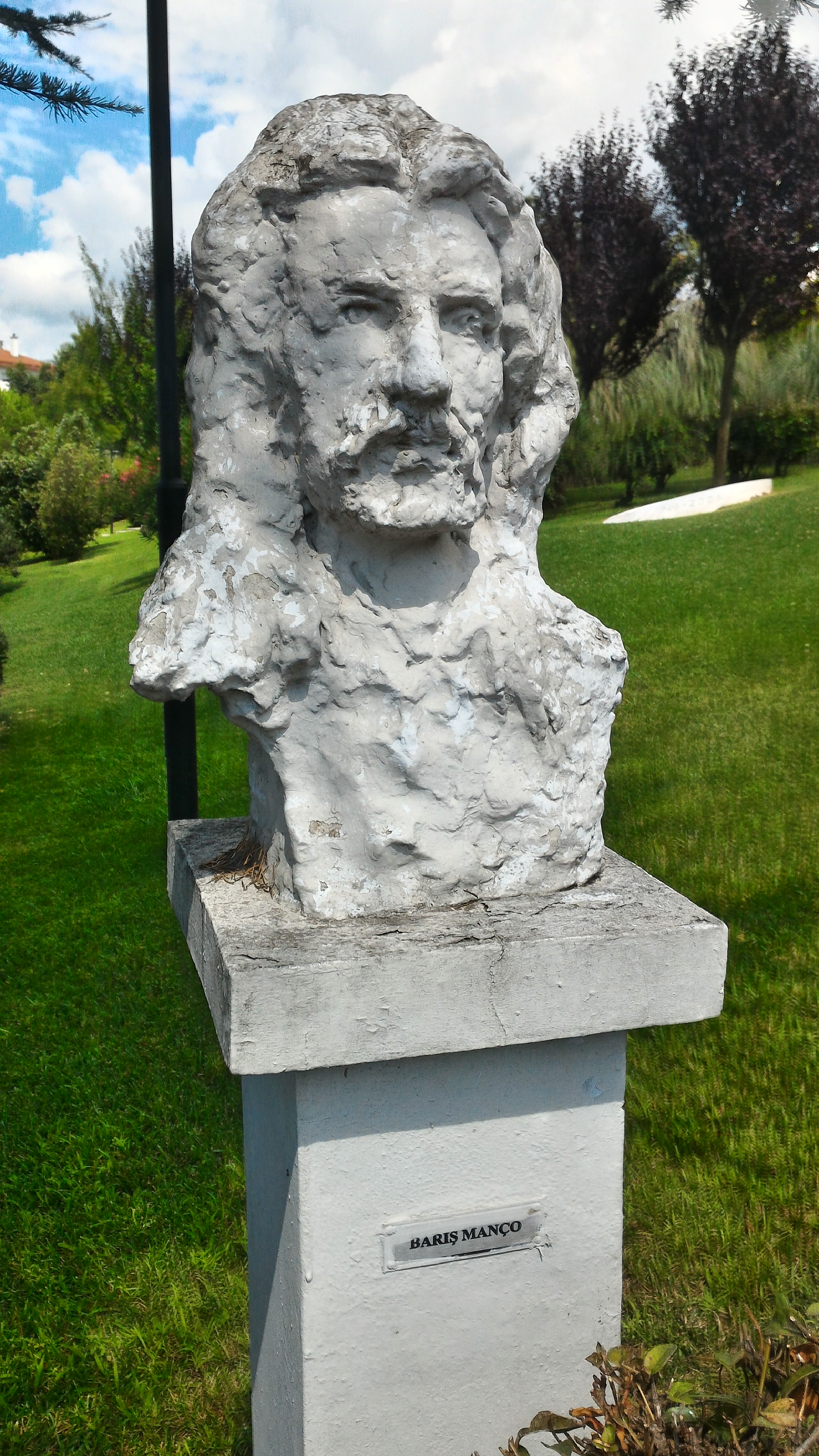
Bust of Barış Manço by Gürdal Duyar.

== Sources ==
- Özgentürk, Nebil (22 May 2004). "Heykeltıraşın ölümü" [Death of a sculptor] (in Turkish). Istanbul. Sabah.
