= Necati Cumalı (sculpture) =

Monument of a Turkish writer

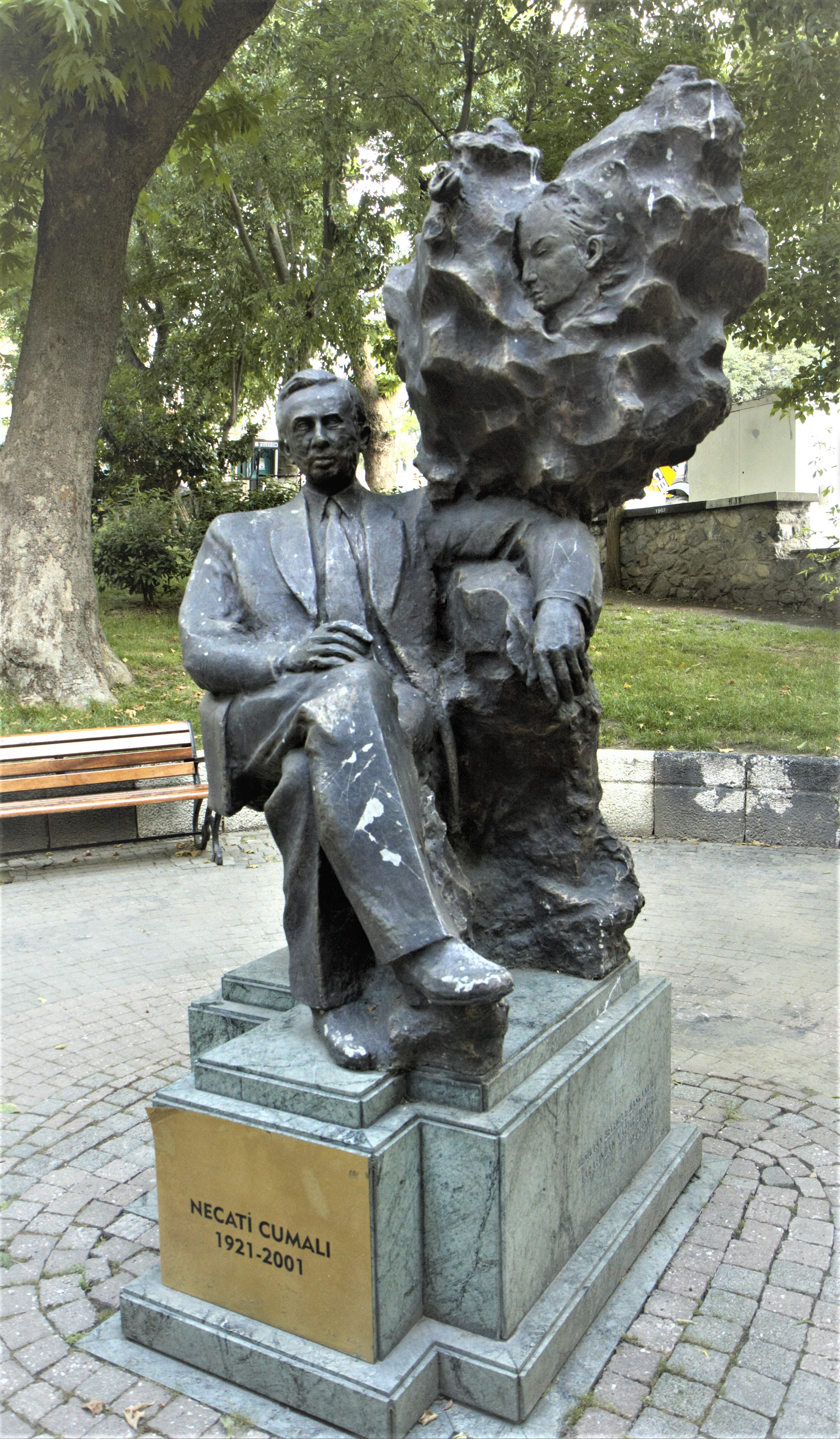
- The sculpture in 2017.
- Location: Sofa Poets Park
- Coordinates: 41°02′31.4″N 29°00′02.6″E
- Designer: Gürdal Duyar
- Type: sculpture
- Material: Bronze
- Completion date: 2002
- Opening date: 13 December 2002; 22 years ago
- Dedicated to: Necati Cumalı
- KE No: 7028

The Necati Cumalı sculpture is a monument in commemoration of Turkish writer Necati Cumalı. The sculpture was erected in 2002 after his death. It was an initiative of the Beşiktaş municipality who commissioned the sculptor Gürdal Duyar.

== History ==
A photo of the inauguration ceremony of the sculpture in 2002.

The mayor of Beşiktaş Yusuf Namoğlu had met with Cumalı and told him of his intentions for a sculpture. Cumalı told Namoğlu in which pose and by which sculptor he would like the sculpture to be made and then they decided on the location together. Cumalı died 15 days later.

The sculpture was completed in one year by Gürdal Duyar after Necati Cumalı had died. It was inaugurated on the birthday of Necati Cumalı on 13 January in 2002. The opening ceremony saw Namoğlu give a speech.

== Description ==
The sculpture is located in the portion of Vişnezade Park that goes by the name Sofa Poets Park.

The sculpture depicts Cumalı sitting with his right leg crossed over his left leg. He is looking forward. His right arm is in his lap while his left arm rests on something. Above his left arm there is rose with a face relief inside it. The face is of Cumalı's wife Berrin.

The sculpture sits on a stone plinth.

The sculpture was sponsored by İşbank.

== Reactions ==
Berrin Cumalı, the widow of Necati Cumalı said that Necati Cumalı was 'born again' in reaction to the sculpture. She also noted the love between them through mentioning her face depicted in the rose next to the body of Cumalı in the sculpture.

== Photos ==
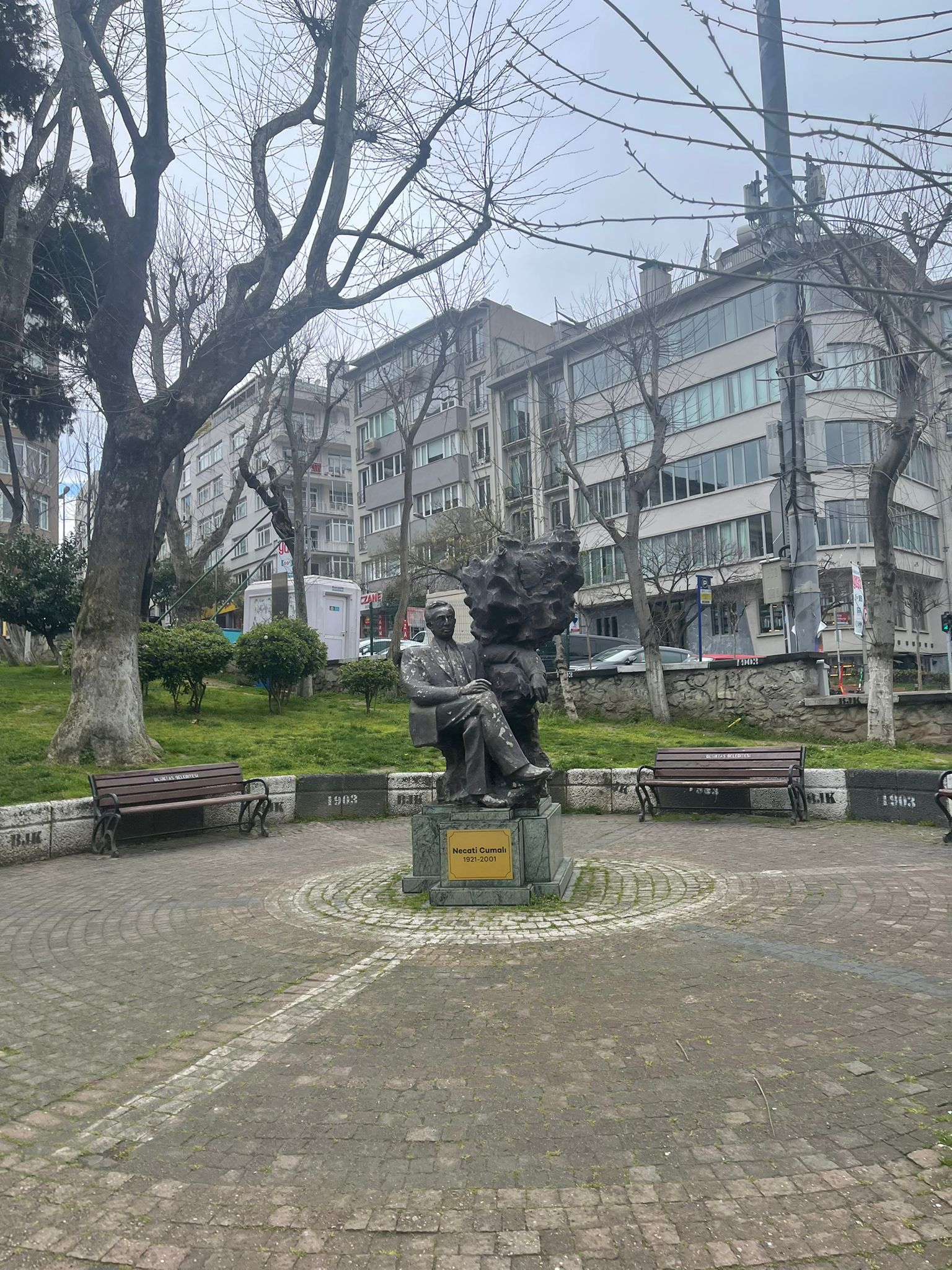

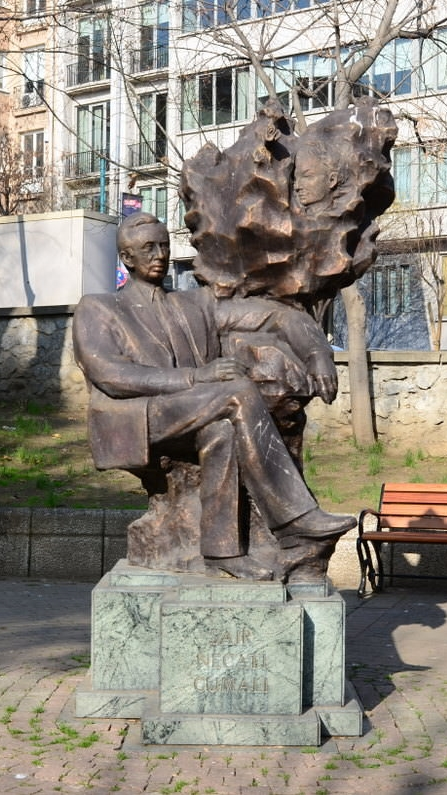

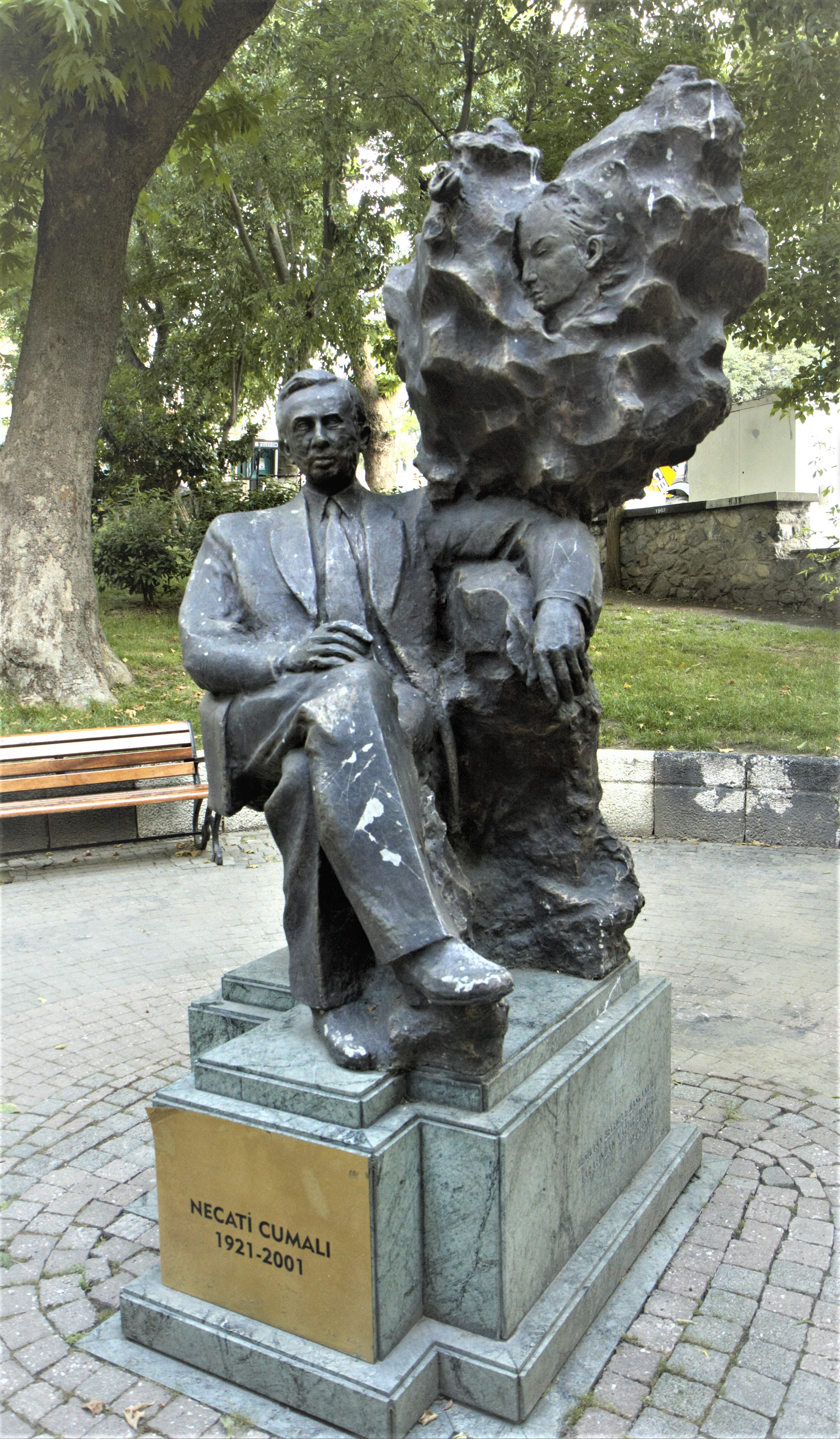
The sculpture in 2017.

== External sources ==
- "Açık Alan Heykelleri" [Outdoor Sculptures]. besiktasgorselsanatlar.com (in Turkish). Beşiktaş Municipality. 2016. Archived from the original on 29 September 2017.
- Demir, Bülent (13 January 2002). "Necati Cumalı heykeli Beşiktaş'ta" [The Necati Cumalı sculpture is in Beşiktaş] (in Turkish). NTV.
- Gazetesi, Yeni Mesaj (14 January 2002). "Beşiktaş'a Necati Cumalı heykeli". Archived from the original on 22 June 2018.
- Cangül, Caner (13 January 2014). "Şairler Sofası Parkı'nın Şairleri - burada istanbul var". www.istanbulium.net.
