= Mounted Atatürk Monument (Kayseri) =

Statue in Kayseri, Turkey

- tr: Süvari Atatürk Anıtı
- The Kayseri Atatürk Monument in its original location.
- Artist: Gürdal Duyar
- Year: 1974
- Condition: moved
- Location: Kayseri
- Owner: Kayseri Municipality

The Mounted Atatürk Monument Süvari Atatürk Anıtı is as equestrian statue of Atatürk by Gürdal Duyar that was erected in 1974 on the Republic Square in Kayseri. It was covered in a tarp for years and was later moved to the Kültürpark.
