= Zühtü Müridoğlu =

Turkish sculptor

- Born: 26 January 1906; Istanbul, Ottoman Empire
- Died: 21 August 1992 (aged 86); Istanbul, Turkey
- Resting place: Ottoman
- Education: Sanayi-i Nefise Mektebi
- Known for: Sculpture
- Awards: Sedat Simavi Vakfı; 1977; Atatürk Sanat Armağanı; 1981

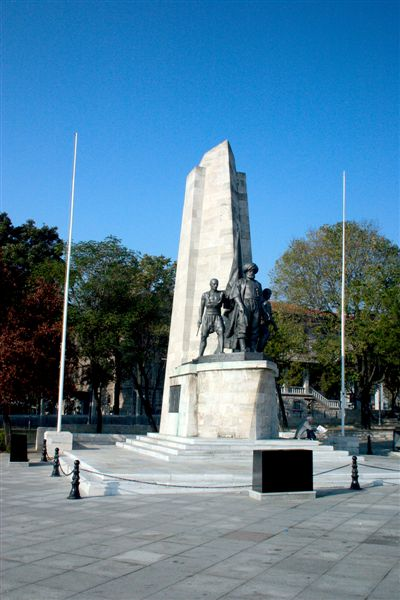
The Barbaros Monument that Müridoğlu made together with Ali Hadi Bara

Zühtü Müridoğlu (26 January 1906 – 21 August 1992) was a Turkish sculptor and one of the first sculptors of the Republican generation.

He attended the Sanayi-i Nefise Mektebi, and was a student of İhsan Özsoy, there from 1924 to 1928. Graduating at the end of that period, he earned a scholarship to Europe and went to Paris, France. He studied art history at the Louvre and aesthetic lessons at Sorbonne. After returning to Turkey, he worked as a teacher from 1932 to 1936. He was one of the founders of the artists collective called D Grubu ("D Group"). In 1936, he worked at the Istanbul Archaeological Museum as a sculptor. In 1939, he taught at the Ankara Gazi Eğitim Enstisüsü, and later at the Fine Arts Institute in Istanbul. After staying in Paris again from 1947 to 1949, he came back to the Academy, and started to teach in his own atelier. In 1955, he opened the Ağaç Uygulama Atölyesi, and became a professor in 1969. In 1971, he retired, however, continued to participate for a long time. Later, he won the Sedat Simavi Vakfı award in 1977, and Atatürk Sanat Armağanı Award in 1981.

He opened his first personal exhibition in 1932, which focused on monument design. After 1953, he moved more in the abstract direction. He used many materials collected from nature, such as tree branches. After 1975, he returned to his original style.

Müridoğlu was among the contributors of the cultural magazine Yeni Adam.

== Notable works ==
- Barbaros Monument (1942), in collaboration with Ali Hadi Bara
- Zonguldak Mounted Atatürk and İnönü Monuments (1946)
- Man head, located at the Istanbul Painting and Sculpture Museum
- Sitting woman
- Low Reliefs at the Anıtkabir (1953)
- Copper Reliefs at the Anıtkabir and Istanbul Painting and Sculpture Museum
- Yaşamak, tree
- ikizler
- Büyükada Atatürk Monument (1965)
- Muş Atatürk Monument (1965)

== Sources ==
- "Zühtü Müridoğlu (1906 – .... )". kimkimdir.gen.tr. Archived from the original on 21 April 2018.
- Kuzucular, Şahamettin (14 April 2012). "Zühtü Müridoğlu". edebiyatvesanatakademisi.com. Archived from the original on 19 April 2018.
- "Zühtü Müridoğlu". biyografya.com.
