= Burhaniye Atatürk Monument =

Sculpture by Gürdal Duyar

- The Burhaniye Atatürk Monument
- Artist: Gürdal Duyar
- Year: 1967
- Dimensions: 3 m (9.8 ft)
- Condition: removed and lost
- Location: Burhaniye

The Burhaniye Atatürk Monument was a bronze Atatürk sculpture by Gürdal Duyar in Edremit, Burhaniye, Turkey. It represents the events around the struggles of the Kuva-yi Milliye during the Turkish War of Independence.

== Description ==
The sculpture depicts Atatürk standing and looking forward. His left arm is open and extended slightly backwards and down beside him with his hand at about hip-height; which is open and has the fingers spread out. His right hand is closed and over his heart in the middle of his chest.

The sculpture was 3 metres (9.8 ft) tall and was made of bronze. Through the sculpture Gürdal Duyar tells a story of the many legendary events during the national struggle of the Kuva-yi Milliye in Burhaniye during the Turkish War of Independence. It is noted that tourists would often take a break at the sculpture and take photos of it. The sculpture became loved by many people of Burhaniye. One of these people was an old gardener who brought back seeds from The Netherlands and planted red, pink, marbled and white poppies that surpassed knee height. Poppies are also symbolic as a flower to remember the dead of war with.

== History ==
The sculpture was to be erected in Edremit, Burhaniye. The area where the sculpture was to be erected was designed by E. Demirok. The sculpture was inaugurated in 1967.
