= Abdi İpekçi Peace Monument =

Sculpture by Gürdal Duyar in Istanbul

- Abdi İpekçi Barış Anıtı
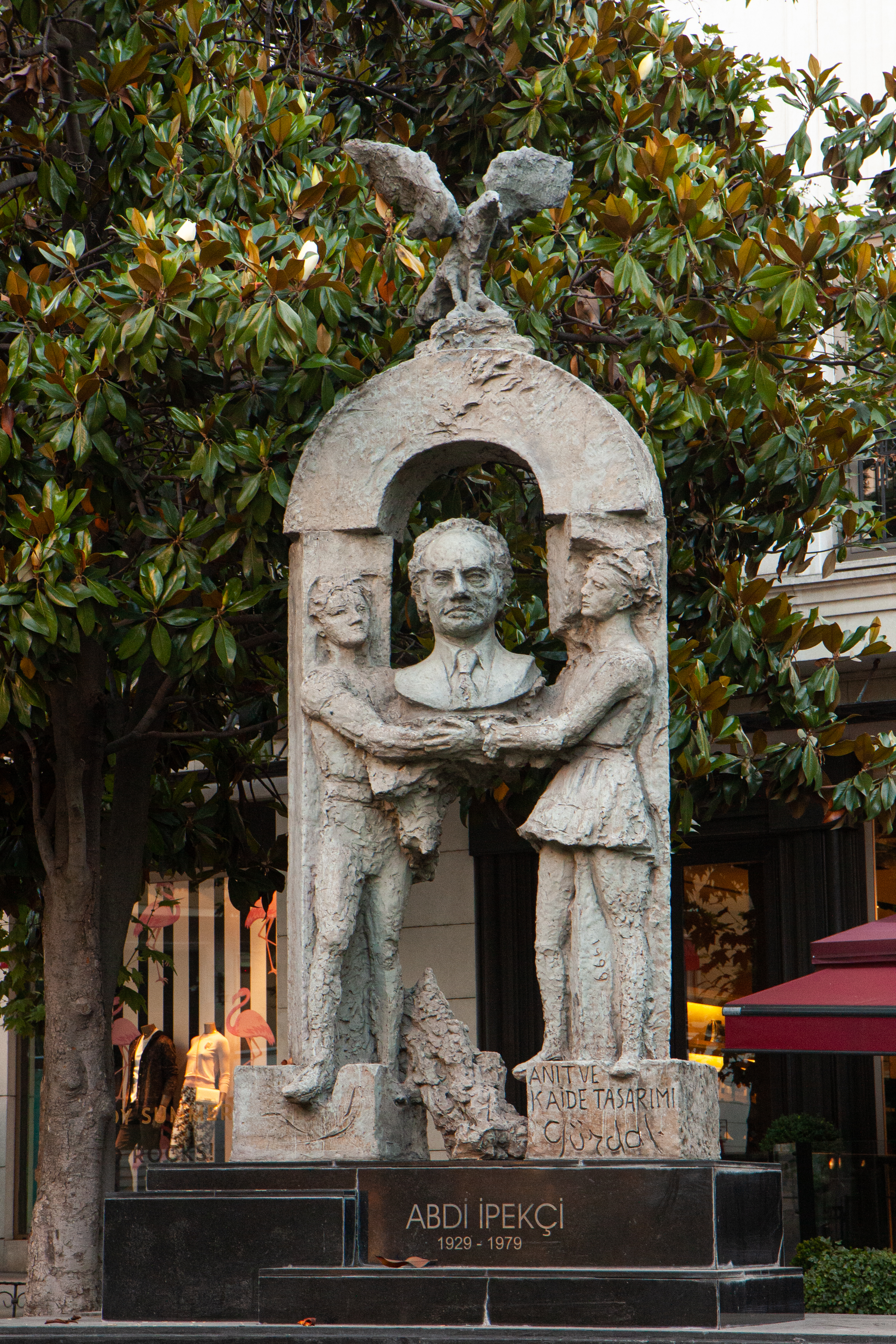
- The monument in 2017.
- Interactive map of Abdi İpekçi Peace Monument
- Location: Abdi İpekçi Street
- Coordinates: 41°02′58″N 28°59′30″E
- Designer: Gürdal Duyar
- Type: sculpture
- Material: Bronze
- Height: 3.5 metres (11 ft)
- Completion date: 1999
- Opening date: 1 February 2000; 25 years ago
- Dedicated to: Abdi İpekçi
- Website: www.sisligezirehberi.com/rehber/abdi-ipekci-baris-aniti/
- Inventory Code: TR.ANT.34.35.14.001

The Abdi İpekçi Peace Monument is a monument sculpted by Gürdal Duyar, commissioned by the Şişli Municipality in 2000 in honor of the editor-in-chief of the Milliyet newspaper Abdi İpekçi and erected at the place where he was assassinated in Istanbul, Turkey, in 1979.

The monument, which was erected on 2000, follows the renaming of Emlak Street to Abdi İpekçi Street in 1979, the Abdi İpekçi Peace and Friendship Prize in 1980, and the Abdi İpekçi Arena in commemorating İpekçi.

== Description ==
The sculpture is located close to the middle of the Abdi İpekçi Street. The sculpture was made by the sculptor Gürdal Duyar. The bronze sculpture is 3.5 metres (11 ft) tall and stands on top of a 70 centimetres (28 in) granite plinth. The composition of the sculpture consists of two children, a boy and a girl, holding up a bust of İpekçi. Behind the boy and girl are two columns supporting an arch, on top of which there is a dove that represents peace.

The monument is located near the location of Abdi İpekçi's former house at the place where he was shot and killed by an assassin in 1979.

== Erection ==
The inauguration ceremony of the monument in 2000.

The project was done by architect Erhan İşözen upon the request of the Şişli municipality. The sculptor Gürdal Duyar brought the project to life. The monument was inaugurated on the 21st anniversary of Abdi İpekçi's assassination, following a ceremony at İpekçi's grave at the Zincirlikuyu Cemetery. The inauguration was attended by İpekçi's family, close friends, and colleagues such as the editor-in-chief at the time of the Milliyet newspaper Yalçın Doğan and President of the Turkish Journalists Association Nail Güreli. Doğan and Güreli made speeches during the inauguration ceremony. During the ceremony Güreli said that the system didn't let much light be shed onto the assassination and that the assassins were being protected, stating: "The negligence of the rulers of the country led to the murder of İpekçi and many journalists by dark forces. This ignorance must end now. Unfortunately, such an effort is not evident." Andreas Politakis, founder of the Abdi İpekçi Peace and Friendship Prize, sent a wreath to the ceremony which was on 1 February 2000. On the wreath it was written that "Abdi İpekçi's vision for Turkish-Greek rapprochement comes true 21 years later." The ceremony, which was attended by the Mayor of Şişli Municipality Mustafa Sarıgül, had a large crowd.

== Later events ==
In 2006, journalists who opposed the release of İpekçi's murderer Mehmet Ali Ağca participated in the Abbas Güçlü ile Genç Bakış program which was held in front of Abdi İpekçi's monument. The program Abbas Güçlü ile Genç Bakış was broadcast from the street for the first time. Before the program in which many journalists reacted to this decision, guests left red carnations at İpekçi's monument and commemorated İpekçi.

On 3 May 2018, World Press Freedom Day, the Press Council members flew pigeons in front of the Abdi İpekçi Monument.

İpekçi is remembered in ceremonies in front of the monument such as at the 43rd, and the 44th anniversary of his assassination.

== See also ==
- List of public art in Istanbul
