= Abdi İpekçi Street =

Street in Istanbul, Turkey

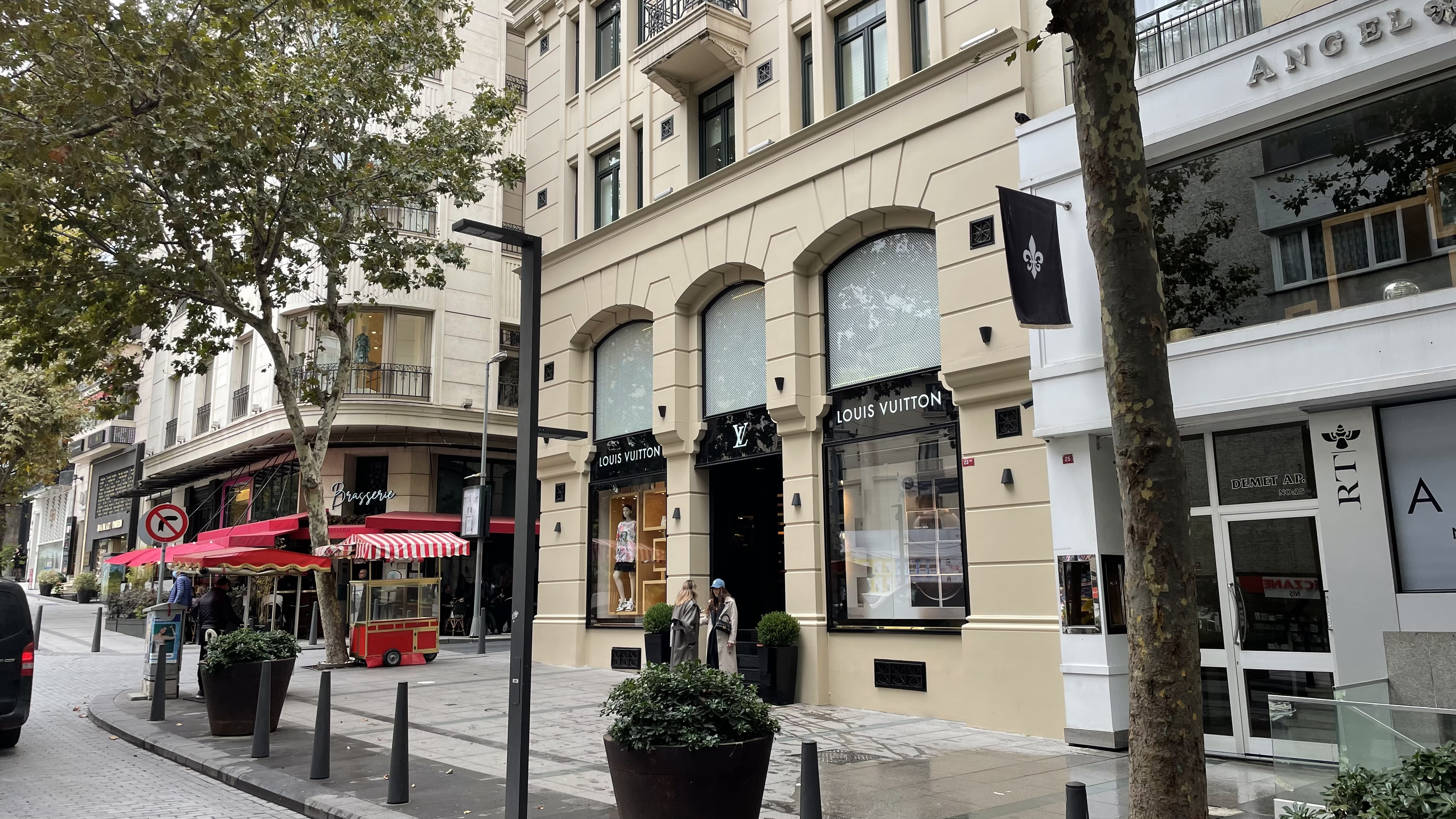
- Interactive map of Abdi İpekçi Street
- Native name: Abdi İpekçi Caddesi (Turkish)
- Former name: Abdi İpekçi Street
- Length: 700 m (2,300 ft)
- Location: Maçka-Nişantaşı, Şişli, Istanbul, Turkey
- Postal code: 34367
- Coordinates: 41.04991°N 28.99168°E
- From: Bayıldım Caddesi
- Major junctions: Mim Kemal Öke Caddesi, Bronz Sokak, Atiye Sokak, Teşvikiye Bostanı Sokak, Eytam Caddesi, Altın Sokak and Profesör Doktor Feyzi Feyzioğlu Sokak
- To: Vali Konağı Caddesi

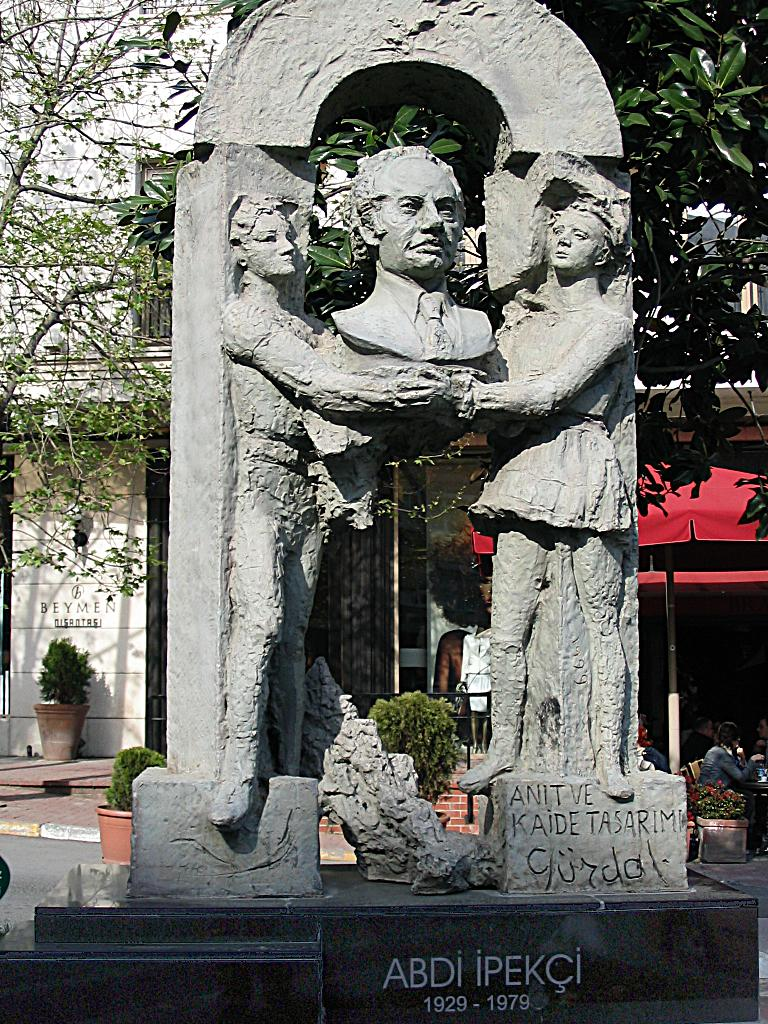
The memorial for Abdi İpekçi on the street.

Abdi İpekçi Street or Abdi İpekçi Avenue (Turkish: Abdi İpekçi Caddesi) is one of the premier shopping streets of Istanbul, Turkey, located in the Şişli district. It runs along the Maçka and Teşvikiye neighborhoods, extending from Bayıldım Caddesi/Maçka Caddesi to Vali Konağı Caddesi in the Nişantaşı quarter, crossing Mim Kemal Öke Caddesi, Bronz Sokak, Atiye Sokak, Teşvikiye Bostanı Sokak, Eytam Caddesi, Altın Sokak and Profesör Doktor Feyzi Feyzioğlu Sokak on its length of around 700 m in a generally northern direction.

During the last decade, the street in the prestigious neighborhood developed into a place hosting luxury retail shopping venues. With a monthly lease price of about $3500 m², it is currently the most expensive street for retail stores in Turkey. A variety of exclusive and expensive shops offering Turkish and international designer labels, restaurants of international cuisine and cafés line both sides of the street.

The street was renamed after Abdi İpekçi, the renowned journalist and the editor-in-chief of the major Turkish newspaper Milliyet. İpekçi was murdered on February 1, 1979, in his car in front of his apartment residence in this street by Mehmet Ali Ağca, who later gained further notoriety for his failed assassination attempt on Pope John Paul II. A memorial near the place, where İpekçi was murdered, was unveiled in 2000.

Some of the many shops include:

- Hugo Boss
- Chanel
- Louis Vuitton
- Giorgio Armani
- Cartier
- Prada
- Hermès
- Gucci
- Ermenegildo Zegna
- Dior
- Tod's
- DKNY
- Escada
- Burberry
- Max Mara
- Salvatore Ferragamo
- Gianfranco Ferré

== New Year celebration ==
Open-air New Year's Eve welcome in the decorated street is newly becoming traditional as an alternative to the celebration at the more crowded Taksim Square.

== See also ==
- İstiklal Avenue
- Bağdat Avenue
- List of upscale shopping districts
