= Yalçın Küçük =

Turkish academic (1938–2026)

Personal details
- Born: 1 July 1938 İskenderun, Turkey
- Died: 6 April 2026 (aged 87) Ankara, Turkey
- Citizenship: Turkey
- Education: Faculty of Political Science, Ankara University
- Occupation: Academician

Yalçın Küçük (1 July 1938 – 6 April 2026) was a Turkish socialist writer, economist, historian and media pundit, recognized for his historical studies on the late-Ottoman and Republican periods in the history of Turkey and Soviet economic development from a Marxist perspective and also his interest in crypto-Judaism in Turkey (Sabbateanism) and criticism of the Justice and Development Party.

== Background ==
Küçük was born in Iskenderun. His father's ancestry is Turkoman while his mother's is Caucasian. He went to the Kabataş High School, followed by Ankara University. He graduated in 1960 with a degree in political science.

== Career ==
His first job was in the State Planning Organization, where he eventually oversaw the Long Term Planning department. In 1966 he found a position at the Middle East Technical University. He was fired after the 1971 military memorandum. Before the coup he wrote calling for a "Socialist Revolution" and a socialist administration in Turkey in the leftist publications Yön, Emek, Ant. He is also well known for his bitter criticisms of another strategy called "National Democratic Revolution" (Turkish: Milli Demokratik Devrim).

In 1973, he became a reserve officer at the Polatlı Artillery school (the military service is compulsory in Turkey) and served in the 1974 Turkish military operation in Cyprus. Afterward he ran the economy department of the established newspaper, Cumhuriyet. He also ran the economics bulletin of the Anka news agency.

He soon devoted himself to leftist causes, such as editing the newspaper Yürüyüş and relaunching of the Workers Party of Turkey (Turkish: Türkiye İşçi Partisi). The party kicked him and some others out in 1978; so, they launched a magazine called Socialist Power (Turkish: Sosyalist İktidar) the next year.

In 1979 he joined Ankara University but was again dismissed after the next coup, in 1980. He returned to academia at Gazi University, and retired in 1987.

== Retirement from academia ==
In his retirement, he continued to write for Social Liberation (Turkish: Toplumsal Kurtuluş) and Always Forward (Turkish: Hep İleri). In 1993, he interviewed the leader of the Kurdistan Workers' Party, Abdullah Öcalan in Syria's Bekaa Valley. Numerous photographs were leaked depicting Öcalan providing Küçük with a tour of the camp, and dining with him.

Küçük's photographs with Abdullah Öcalan were in fact published in his own books and journals edited by Küçük himself in the 1990s during his contact with PKK. He asserted on various TV channels and in interviews that these photographs were neither secret nor a cause for shame. As a social scientist and a socialist he analyzed what he claimed was the most powerful insurgency against the Turkish state. Kurdish political organizations other than the PKK claimed that Küçük "Kemalized" Öcalan by persuading him to turn his back on separatism.

He left Turkey for Paris in 1993 as a protest against the election of Süleyman Demirel to the presidency and brothel owner Matild Manukyan becoming a top taxpayer, but returned after the 1997 "post-modern" coup. However, he was sentenced to two years in prison for spreading separatist propaganda (his interviews with Öcalan). He briefly had a show on Sky Türk called Pens and Swords (Turkish: Kalemler ve Kılıçlar) but it got pulled allegedly after complaints from the government and the former chief of general staff, Yaşar Büyükanıt.

His houses in Karakusunlar, Ankara and Balat, Istanbul were searched in January 2009 in the context of the ongoing Ergenekon investigation. His lawyer, Dursun Ermiş, arrived at Küçük's home in Ankara to field journalists' questions. The search warrant was issued by the Ninth Heavy Penal Court in İstanbul. The police were searching for documents pertaining to the Ergenekon network. After the end of the 5 year custody limit, he was released from the prison in 2014.

== Death ==
Kücük died on 6 April 2026, at the age of 87. Two days later, he was buried at Cebeci Asri Cemetery.

== Selected bibliography ==
Küçük was a prolific writer:

- Türkiye üzerine Tezler - 5 volumes (Thesis' about Turkey)
- Aydın Üzerine Tezler - 5 volumes (Thesis' about intellectuals)
- 100 Soruda Planlama Kalkınma ve Türkiye (Planning - Development in 100 question and Turkey)
- Endüstrileşmenin Temel Sorunları: Sovyet Deneyimi (Basic problems of industrialisation: the soviet experience)
- Yeni Bir Cumhuriyet için (For a new republic)
- Bilim ve Edebiyat (Science and Literature)
- Qua Vadimus - Nereye Gidiyoruz? (Where are we going?)
- Sovyetler Birliğinde Sosyalizmin Kuruluşu (Foundation of socialism in Soviet Union)
- Sovyetler Birliğinde Sosyalizmin Çözülüşü (2010) (Collapse of socialism in Soviet Union)
- Küfür Romanları (Novels of Insult)
- Estetik Hesaplaşma (Aesthetical Payoff)
- İtirafçıların İtirafları (Confessions of confessors)
- 21 Yaşında Çocuk: Fatih Sultan Mehmet (A 21-year-old boy: Mehmet the Conqueror)
- Ermeni Rahiple Mektuplaşmalar (Letters to an Armenian priest)
- Emperyalist Türkiye (Imperialist Turkey)
- Kürtler Üzerine Tezler (Thesis on Kurds)
- Kürt Bahçesinde Sözleşi (Interviews in kurdish garden)
- Tekeliyet 1–2 (Monopoly 1–2)
- Tekelistan (Monopolyland 1–2)
- İsimlerin İbranileştirilmesi / Tekelistan - 1 / Türk Yahudi isimleri Sözlüğü (Hebrewation of names / Monopolyland 1 / Turkish - Hebrew names dictionary)
- Tarih 1–2 (History 1–2)
- İsyan 1–2 (Rebellion 1–2)
- Şebeke 1 (Network 1)
- Putları Yıkıyorum - Önsözler 1 (I'm breaking the idols - Prewords 1)
- Türkiye Büyülü Hapishanem (Turkey, my magical prison)
- Ders 1: Küçülme Savaş (Lesson 1: Don't get minimize, make war)
- Devlet ve Hürriyet (State and Freedom)
- Caligula: Saralı Cumhur (2007) (Epileptic Public)
- Sol Müdahale (2007) (Left Intervention)
- Aforizmalar (2008) (Aphorisms)
- Epilepsi ile Orgazm: Mediko-Politik (2008) (Epilepsy and Orgasm: Medico-Politic)
- Çöküş (2010) (Decadence)
- Haberci (2010) (The Precursor)
- Fitne (2010) (The Cabal)
- Hasta Despot (2010) (Ailing Despot)
- Cumhuriyet'e Karşı Küfür Romanları (2011) (Novels of Insult Against The Republic)
- Çıkış - Ansiklopedi 1 (2014) (Exodus - Encyclopedia 1)
- Fitne - Gizli Tarih (2015) (The Cabal - Classified History)
