= Ali Hadi Bara =

Turkish sculptor

- Self portrait of Hadi Bara
- Born: September 9, 1906; Tehran, Iran
- Died: August 30, 1971 (aged 64); Istanbul, Turkey
- Education: Fine Arts Academy in Istanbul
- Known for: Sculpture

Ali Hadi Bara (September 9, 1906 – August 30, 1971) was a Turkish sculptor and one of the first artists of the Republican generation in Turkey.

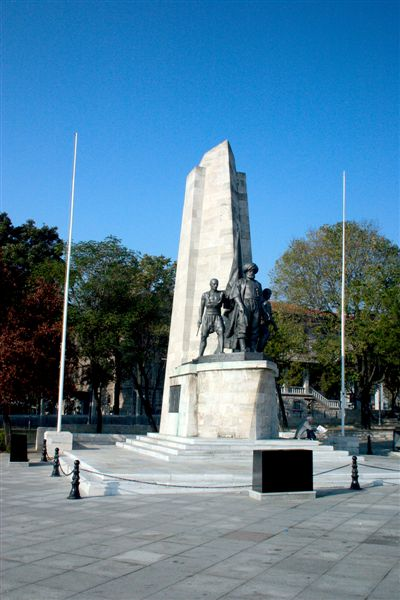
Monument to the famous Ottoman admiral, Barbarossa Hayreddin by Ali Hadi Bara

== Biography ==
Ali Hadi Bara was born in Tehran but moved with his family to the Ottoman Empire when he was young. From 1923 to 1927 he studied at the Fine Arts Academy in Istanbul. Following this he went to Paris and studied sculpture with Henri Bouchard and Charles Despiau. In 1930 he returned to Istanbul and the Fine Arts Academy to become an assistant teacher. He visited Paris between 1949 and 1950, after which he ceased to create figural works and instead turned to creating non-figural sculpture. From 1950 until his death in 1971 he worked at the Academy in Istanbul.

== Works ==
- Adana Monument (1935)
- Monument to Atatürk (1937)
- Statue of 16th-century Ottoman admiral Barbarossa in Beşiktaş, Istanbul. (1946 on 400th anniversary of Barbarossa's death)
- Monument of Atatürk and Ismet Inönü on Horseback in Zonguldak

== Exhibitions ==
- Venice Biennale (1956, 1958)
- São Paulo Biennial (1957, 1961)
- Exposition Internationale de Sculpture Contemporaine at the Musée Rodin, Paris (1961)
- Turkish High Sculptors Society exhibition at the Taksim Art Gallery (1973)

== Bibliography and external links ==
- D. Erbil: ‘The Development of Turkish Sculpture of the Republican Period’, The Transformation of Turkish Culture: The Atatürk Legacy, ed. G. Renda and C. M. Kortepeter (Princeton, 1986), pp. 131–44
- Consulate General Republic of Turkey: Sculpture
