= Index of Turkey biography-related articles =

== A ==
Abdullah Gül - Abdülhalik Renda - Abdülkadir Koçak - Abdullah Öcalan - Abidin Dino - Adalet Ağaoğlu - Adem Dursun - Adem Kılıççı - Adile Naşit - Adnan Menderes - Adnan Oktar – Adnan Özyalçıner - Agop Dilaçar - Ahmet Çalık - Ahmet Davutoğlu - Ahmet Ertegün – Ahmet Ferit Tek - Ahmet Fikri Tüzer - Ahmet Gündüz Ökçün - Ahmet Hakan - Ahmet Hamdi Tanpinar - Ahmet Köksal - Ahmet Mete Işıkara - Ahmet Kaya - Ahmet Necdet Sezer - Ahmet Özal - Ahmet Özhan - Ahmet Piriştina - Ahmet Taner Kışlalı - Ahmet Ümit - Ahu Antmen - Ajda Pekkan - Alev Alatlı – Alev Demirkesen – Aleyna Tilki - Ali Babacan - Ali Çetinkaya - Ali Dinçer - Ali Erdemir – Ali Fuat Cebesoy - Ali İhsan Göğüş- Ali Koç - Ali Rana Tarhan - Ali Rıza Binboğa - Ali Sabancı - Ali Sami Yen - Ali Teoman Germaner – Aliye Berger - Alparslan Türkeş - Alpay (singer) - Alpay Özalan - Ara Güler - Arda Turan - Arif Mardin - Arzum Onan - Aslı Erdoğan - Asuman Özdağlar - Atagün Yalçınkaya - Atay Aktuğ - Atilla Altıkat – Atila Emek - Atilla Karaosmanoğlu - Avni Arbaş – Aydın Boysan - Aydın Doğan -Aydın Güven Gürkan - Aydın Yılmaz - Ayfer Tunç - Aykut Kocaman - Ayla Dikmen - Ayla Erduran - Aydilge - Aylin Livaneli - Aysel Baykal - Aysel Çelikel - Aysel Gürel - Aysel Özakın - Aysel Tuğluk - Ayşe Arman - Ayşe Hatun Önal - Ayşe Kulin - Ayşe Saffet Rıza Alpar - Ayşe Sibel Ersoy - Ayşegül Sarıca - Ayşenur Zarakolu - Ayten Alpman - Aziz Nesin - Aziz Sancar - Azra Akın - Azmiye Hami Güven

== B ==
Bahadır Demir - Bahire Bediş Morova Aydilek - Bahriye Üçok - Barış Manço - Bedia Muvahhit -Bedrettin Tuncel - Bedri Karafakıoğlu –Behçet Uz - Behice Boran - Behiç Erkin - Behiye Aksoy - Behram Kurşunoğlu - belkıs Akkale - Berkant - Besim Üstünel – Bilge Olgaç – Binali Yıldırım - Birgül Ayman Güler - Birgül Oğuz - Birhan Keskin - Buket Uzuner - Burcu Güneş - Bülent Ecevit - Bülent Eczacıbaşı - Bülent Ersoy - Bülent Korkmaz – Bülent Ulusu

== C ==
Cahit Arf - Cahit Berkay - Cahit Karakaş - Cahit Külebi - Cahit Sıtkı Tarancı - Can Bartu - Canan Bayram - Canan Karatay - Candan Erçetin - Celal Atik - Celal Bayar – Celal Şahin - Celalettin Arif - Cem Karaca – Cem Özdemir - Cemal Gürsel - Cemal Madanoğlu - Cemal Mersinli - Cemal Nadir Güler - Cemal Reşit Rey - Cemal Süreya - Cemal Tural - Cemil Bilsel - Cemil Çiçek - Cemil Sait Barlas - Cevdet Sunay - Ceyhun Atuf Kansu - Cezmi Kartay

== Ç ==
Çetin Alp - Çetin Altan - Çetin Tekindor - Çevik Bir - Çiğdem Talu

== D ==
Damla Günay - Demet Akalın - Demet Sağıroğlu - Demir Sabancı – Deniz Artun – Deniz Seki – Derya Can Göçen - Devlet Bahçeli - Dilek Akagün Yılmaz-Doğan Avcıoğlu - Doğan Hızlan – Doğu Perinçek - Duygu Asena

== E ==
Ebru Gündeş - Ece Temelkuran - Edibe Sözen - Ekrem Alican - Elif Şafak - Elvan Abeylegesse – Emel Esin - Emel Gazimihal - Emel Korutürk - Emel Say - Emel Sayın - Emel Vardar - Emin Boztepe - Emin Çölaşan - Emine Sare Aydın - Emine Semiye Önasya - Emine Ülker Tarhan - Enis Batur – Enver Ziya Karal - Ercüment Ekrem Talu - Erdal İnönü – Erdoğan Teziç - Erkin Koray - Erol Büyükburç -Erol Çevikçe – Erol Evgin - Erol Gelenbe - Erol Sabancı - Ersan Erdura - Ertuğrul Osman – Erol Önderoğlu - Esat Sagay - Esin Afşar - Esin Harvey - Etem Erdinç

== F ==
Fahrettin Altay - Fahrettin Kerim Gökay - Fahri Korutürk - Fahri Özdilek - Fahri Tatan – Fahrunissa Zeid - Faik Ahmet Barutçu - Fakihe Öymen - Falih Rıfkı Atay - Faruk Sükan - Fatih Akın - Fatih Kısaparmak - Fatih Terim - Fatin Rüştü Zorlu – Fatma Esma Nayman - Fatma Hikmet İşmen - Fatma Refet Angın – Fatma Şakir Memik - Fazıl Küçük – Fehmi Yavuz- Ferda Güley - Ferhat Ozcep - Feridun Karakaya – Ferit Melen - Feriha Sanerk - Ferruh Bozbeyli – Fethi Okyar - Fethiye Çetin - Fethullah Gülen - Fevzi Çakmak - Feza Gürsey- Figen Yüksekdağ - Fikret Mualla – Fikri Sağlar - Filiz Koçali - Filiz Vural - Firuz Kanatlı – Fuat Ağralı - Fuat Köprülü - Fuat Sirmen- Fulya Kantarcıoğlu – Funda İyce Tuncel - Füreya Koral - Füruzan - Füruzan İkincioğulları - Füsun Önal

== G ==
Gazi Yaşargil - Gencay Gürün - Gencay Kasapçı - Gökçen Efe - Gül Çiray - Gül Gölge - Güldal Mumcu - Güler İleri - Güler Duman - Güler Sabancı – Gülkız Ürbül - Gülriz Sururi - Gülsin Onay - Gülsün Sağlamer - Gülşen Bubikoğlu - Gülten Akın - Gülten Kışanak - Günseli Başar – Gürdal Duyar - Güzin Dino

== H ==
Hacı Ömer Sabancı - Hacı Sabancı - Hafız Selman İzbeli - Hakan Balta - Hakan Şükür - Hale Asaf - Halide Edib Adıvar - Halide Nusret Zorlutuna - Halil Mete Soner – Halime Çavuş - Halil Mutlu – Haluk Pekşen - Hamdi Apaydın – Hamdullah Suphi Tanrıöver- Hami Mandıralı - Hamza Yerlikaya - Hasan Âli Yücel - Hasan Fehmi Ataç - Hasan Mutlucan - Hasan Orbay - Hasan Polatkan – Hasan Saka - Hasan Şaş - Haydar Ergülen – Hatice Kumbaracı Gürsöz - Hatice Sabiha Görkey - Hedo Türkoğlu – Hikmet Bayur- Hikmet Bilâ - Hikmet Çetin - Hikmet Sami Türk - Hikmet Şimşek - Hilmi Özkök – Hilmi Uran - Huriye Baha Öniz - Hüdai Oral - Hüseyin Gezer - Hüseyin Kıvrıkoğlu - Hüseyin Çelik - Hüseyin Numan Menemencioğlu - Hüseyin Rahmi Gürpınar

== I ==
Işıl German - Işıl Yücesoy – Işılay Saygın

== İ ==
İbrahim Kutluay - İbrahim Tatlises - İclal Ersin - İdil Biret - İhsan Eryavuz - İhsan Sabancı - İlhami Sancar - İlhan Berk – İlker Başbuğ - İlhan Koman - İlyas Seçkin – İlhan Selçuk - İnci Aral - İnci Asena - İpek Ongun - İsmail Acar - İsmail Akçay - İsmail Bilen - İsmail Cem - İsmail Rüştü Aksal - İsmet İnönü - İsmet Özel - İsmet Sezgin - İstemihan Talay

== J ==
Jale Arıkan - Jale İnan - Jale Yılmabaşar - Janet Akyüz Mattei

== K ==
Kara Fatma - Kaya Erdem - Kayahan – Kazım Karabekir - Kazım Orbay - Kazım Özalp - Kemal Arıkan – Kemal Atatürk - Kemal Derviş - Kemal Güven - Kemal Kılıçdaroğlu - Kemal Kurt - Kemal Satır - Kemal Sunal - Kemal Tahir - Kemal Türkler - Kemal Unakıtan - Kenan Evren - Kenan Yontunç - Kerime Nadir - Koray Ariş - Kutlug Ataman

== L ==
Lale Aytaman - Lale Mansur - Lale Müldür - Lale Oraloğlu - Lale Orta - Latife Tekin - latife Uşaklıgil - Lebit Yurdoğlu – Lefter Küçükandonyadis - Leman Altınçekiç - Lerzan Bengisu - Leyla Alaton - Leyla Gamsiz Sarptürk - Leyla Gencer - Leyla Zana

== M ==
Macit Özcan - Mahir Cagri - Mahir Tomruk – Mahmut Esat Bozkurt – Makbule Atadan - Mari Gerekmezyan - Mazhar Müfit Bey - Mehmet Ağar - Mehmet Akif Ersoy - Mehmet Ali Ağca – Mehmet Ali Erbil - Mehmet Aslantuğ - Mehmet Baydar - Mehmet Emin Karamehmet - Mehmet Eymür - Mehmet Günsur - Mehmet Fuat Köprülü - Mehmet Nadir - Mehmet Nazif Günal - Mehmet Okur - Mehmet Öz - Mehmet Sabancı – Melahat Okuyan - Melda Bayer- Melih Kibar – Meral Akşener – Meral Okay - Meltem Arıkan - Meriç Sümen - Mesrur İzzet Bey - Mesude Hülya Şanes Doğru - Mesut Yılmaz – Mete Akyol - Metin Ersoy - Metin Kacan - Metin Oktay - Metin Toker – Metin Yurdanur- Mîna Urgan – Muazzez Tahsin Berkand - Muazzez İlmiye Çığ - Muhittin Serin - Murathan Mungan - Mustafa Akaydın - Mustafa Altioklar - Mustafa Aydın - Mustafa Denizli - Mustafa İnan – Mustafa Necati - Mustafa Ok - Mustafa Sandal - Mustafa Suphi - Mustafa Üstündağ (actor) - Mustafa Üstündağ (politician) - Muzzy İzzet - Müfide İlhan - Müjdat Gezen - Mümtaz Ökmen - Mümtaz Soysal - Münir Nurettin Selçuk

== N ==
Naci Erdem - Naci Tınaz - Naim Süleymanoğlu – Naim Talu - Namık Kemal Yolga - Nazım Hikmet - Nazan Bekiroğlu - Nazlı Deniz Kuruoğlu - Nebil Özgentürk - Necdet Karababa - Necdet Kent - Necdet Mahfi Ayral - Necdet Calp – Necdet Uğur - Necmettin Erbakan - Necmettin Sadak - Nejat Eczacıbaşı – Nermin Abadan Unat - Nermin Farukî - Nesrin Nas - Nermin Neftçi - Nesrin Sipahi – Neşe Aybey – Neşe Erberk - Neşet Ertaş - Nevin Yanıt - Nevit Kodallı - Nezihe Araz - Nezihe Bilgütay Derler - Nihal Güres - Nihat Ergün - Nihat Erim - Nijat Sirel - Nil Burak - Nilüfer Göle - Nilüfer Yumlu - Nimet Baş - Nur Serter - Nuray Hafiftas - Nurduran Duman - Nurcan Taylan - Nuri Bilge Ceylan - Nuran Tanrıverdi - Nusret Suman - Numan Kurtulmuş - Nur Tatar - Nurcan Taylan - Nurettin Canikli - Nursen Güven - Nurullah Ataç - Nükhet Duru - Nükhet Ruacan

== O ==
Oğuz Aral - Oğuz Atay - Oğuz Yılmaz – Okay Gönensin - Oktay Sinanoğlu – Onur Kumbaracıbaşı - Orhan Alp - Orhan Karaveli - Orhan Mersinli - Orhan Pamuk - Orhan Veli – Osman Bölükbaşı - Osman Esim Olcay - Oya Araslı – Oya Baydar - Oya Germen

== Ö ==
Ömer Çelik - Ömer Faruk Tekbilek - Ömer Halisdemir - Ömer Kavur - Ömer Sabancı - Önder Sisters - Özgü Namal

== P ==
Pakize Tarzi - Patriarch Bartholomew I - Peride Celal - Perihan Mağden - Perran Kutman - Peyami Safa - Pınar Selek

== R ==
Rabia Kazan - Rahşan Ecevit - Rahmi Koç – Ramize Erer - Rauf Denktaş - Rauf Orbay – Recep Peker - Recep Tayyip Erdoğan – Refet Bele - Refik Erduran - Refik Halit Karay – Refik Koraltan - Refik Saydam - Remziye Hisar - Reşat Nuri Güntekin - Reşit Galip - Reşit Süreyya Gürsey – Rüzgar Erkoçlar

== S ==
Sabiha Bengütaş - Sabiha Gökçen - Sabiha Gökçül Erbay – Sabiha Sertel - Sabire Aydemir - Sabit Osman Avcı - Sadık Kutlay - Sadi Irmak - Saffet Arıkan - Safiye Ali - Safiye Ayla - Saim Bugay - Sakıp Sabancı - Samet Ağaoğlu - Sedat Artuç – Seha Meray - Selim Gökdemir - Selim Sarper - Selma Emiroğlu - Selma Rıza - Semih Şentürk - Semih Terzi- Semiha Es - Semiha Berksoy - Semiha Yankı - Semra Aksu - Semra Ertan - Semra Sezer - Semra Özal - Semra Özdamar - Selma Gürkan - Sennur Sezer - Serdar Bilgili - Serkan Aykut - Serkan Balcı - Sertab Erener - Sevdiye Nilgün Acar - Sevgi Soysal - Sevil Atasoy - Sevil Sabancı - Sevim Tekeli - Seyhan Kurt - Seyhun Topuz - Seyit Çabuk - Seyit Torun - Seyyal Taner - Sezen Aksu - Sıddık Sami Onar - Sibel Egemen - Sibel Kekilli - Suat Derviş - Suat Hayri Ürgüplü – Suat Berk - Sulhi Dölek - Suna Kan – Suna Tanaltay – Suzan Zengin - Süleyman Demirel - Süleyman Genç - Süleyman Soylu - Süreyya Ayhan

== Ş ==
Şadi Çalık - Şahamettin Kuzucular - Şarık Arıyak - Şahamettin Kuzucular - Şahap Sıtkı - Şefika Kutluer – şekip Akalın - Şemsettin Günaltay - Şenay Yüzbaşıoğlu - Şenol Güneş – Şevket Altuğ - Şevket Aziz Kansu - Şevket Pamuk - Şevket Sabancı - Şevket Süreyya Aydemir - Şükrü Saracoğlu – Şükrü Kaya - Şule Gürbüz -

== T ==
Tahsin Aykutalp - Talât Sait Halman - Tamer Başoğlu - Taner Sagir - Tanju Çolak - Tanju Okan - Taner Öner - Tansu Çiller – Tarık Galip Somer - Tarkan – Tayfun Talipoğlu - Tayfur Sökmen - Tekin Arıburun - Tevfik Esenç - Tevfik Gelenbe –Tevfik İleri - Tevfik Rüştü Aras - Tezer Özlü - Timur Selçuk – Tomur Atagök - Tugay Kerimoğlu - Tunc Hamarat - Turan Emeksiz – Turgay Şeren - Turgut Özakman - Turgut Özal - Turhan Erdoğan - Turhan Feyzioğlu - Tülay German – Türkan Akyol - Türkan Örs Baştuğ

== U ==
Uğur Ersoy – Uğur Mumcu - Uğur Yücel - Ulvi Cemal Erkin

== Ü ==
Ümit Besen - Ümit Haluk Bayülken - Ümit Kocasakal - Ümit Yaşar Oğuzcan - Ümmiye Koçak

== V ==
Vahit Melih Halefoğlu - Vasıf Çınar - Vecihi Hürkuş – Vehbi Koç

== Y ==
Yahya Kemal Beyatlı - Yakup Kadri Karaosmanoğlu - Yaşar Kemal - Yavuz Görey – Yervant Voskan - Yıldırım Akbulut - Yıldız Eruçman - Yılmaz Güney - Yusuf Akçura - Yusuf İzzet Birand - Yusuf Kemal Bey - Yusuf Taktak

== Z ==
Zehra Çırak - Zehra Say - Zeki Alasya - Zeki Muren - Zeki Sezer - Zeki Velidi Togan - Zekiye Keskin Satir - Zerrin Bölükbaşı - Zerrin Güngör - Zeynel Abidin Erdem – Zeynep Ahunbay - Zeynep Değirmencioğlu - Zeynep Oral - Ziya Gökalp - Zühtü Müridoğlu - Zübeyde Hanım - Zülfü Livaneli
