= Turkish women in public service =

Women in Turkish public service refers to staffed personnel serving in public service in Turkey. According to State Personnel Office, there were 593,000 women in public services out of 1,741,000, which makes up 34% of the total. However, this figure does not include public enterprises. Women are primarily concentrated in education and medicine.

== Women in higher positions ==
The distribution of female employees in authoritative positions is as follows:

- Ambassadors: 11.6%
- Judges: 34.4%
- Governors, general directors etc.: 9.9%

== Civil servants and military officers ==
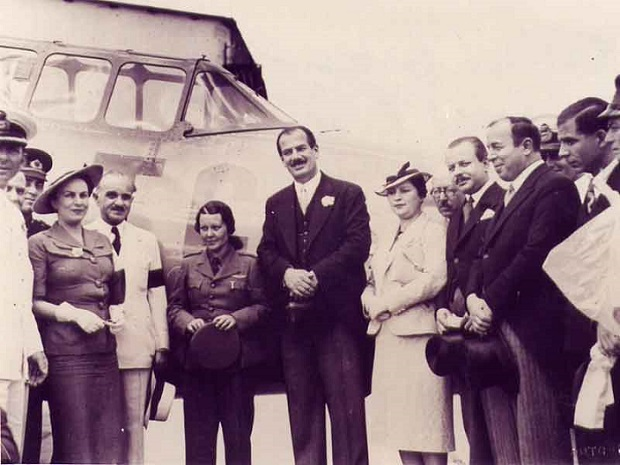
Sabiha Gökçen during her 1938 Balkan tour.

Some female civil servants are shown below:

- Sabire Aydemir (1910–1991) First veterinarian
- Fatma Refet Angın (1915-2010) First high school teacher
- Edibe Subaşı (1920–2011) First female acrobacy pilot in Turkey and one of the founders of Turkish Stars.
- Yıldız Eruçman Became the first female parachuter of Turkey in 1935 jumping from a Russian R-5.
- Nezihe Viranyalı One of the first female pilots of Turkey.
- Leman Bozkurt Altınçekiç (1932, Sarıkamış, Kars – 4 May 2001, İzmir) Retired Air Colonel. The first female jet fighter pilot of the Turkish and NATO Air Forces.
- Lale Aytaman (born 1944) First provincial governor (vali) (1991–1995)
- Tansel Çölaşan (born 1943) Chief prosecutor of Turkish Council of State (2006–2008)
- Sumru Çörtoğlu (born 1943) President of Turkish Council of State (2006–2008)
- Filiz Dinçmen (born 1939) First ambassador (1993–1997)
- Sabiha Gökçen (1913–2001) First military pilot [1936–1955)
- Tayyibe Gülek (born 1968) Prime minister's advisor and pipe line coordinator (1994–1999)
- Birgül Ayman Güler (born in 1961) Trainer in TODAİE
- Zerrin Güngör (born 1955) President of Turkish Council of State (From 2013)-
- Gencay Gürün (born 1932) State theater general secretary (1979–1984)
- Seniha Hızal (1897–1985) First education inspector
- Remziye Hisar (1902–1992) Director of Biochemistry department of Health Institute (1936–1947)
- Füruzan İkincioğulları (born 1933) President of Turkish Council of State (1994–1998)
- Birgen Keleş (born 1939) expert in Planning Organization.
- Melahat Ruacan (1906–1974) First member of Court of Cassation
- Feriha Sanerk (1923–2010) First chief constable (1953–1974)
- Nur Serter (born in 1948) expert in Ministry of Interior and educator in TODAİE
- Ayşe Sezgin (born 1958) Turkish coordinator in European Union talks (at present Turkish Ambassador to Vienna)
- Emine Ülker Tarhan (born 1963) Investigation judge of Court of Cassation (2001–2011)
- Tülay Tuğcu (born 1942) President of the Constitutional Court (2005–2007)
- Özlem Türköne (born 1976) Expert in public procurement authority
- Ayfer Yılmaz (born 1956) Undersecretary of treasury
- Fulya Kantarcıoğlu (born in 1949), member of the Constitutional Court
- Emel Gazimihal (1912-1998), first female speaker
- Ayşe Saffet Rıza Alpar (1903-1081), first university rector
