= Mehmet Bahri =

Turkish sculptor

Mehmet Bahri (c. 1800s–c. 1900s) was an Ottoman and Turkish painter and sculptor.

Bahri was educated at the Sanay-i Nefise Mektebi and was a student of Osgan Efendi. He was close friends with fellow student and sculptor İsa Behzat. After graduating from the Sanay-i Nefise in Istanbul he became the director of the Sanay-i Nefise workshop in Egypt. He is recognised as one of the first sculptors of Turkey.

== Work ==
He was along with Ihsan Özsoy, Isa Behzat and Mahir Tomruk, one of the first four students and graduates of the sculpture department at the Sanay-i Nefise Mektebi, and part of the first generation of Turkish sculptures following Osgan Efendi. He is described as a more decorative worker.

The newspaper of the Ottoman Painters Society featured Bahris works at the time. He was noted for the detail in his technique which was liked to that of Behzat while also giving an important place to the psychological aspect of the subjects portrayed in his sculpture. On the occasion of the exhibition for the 100th anniversary of the Sanay-i Nefise Mektebi two of Bahris sculptures in particular were noted for their qualities: Gülen Adam and Düşünce. They "combine an expressive academic understanding with a humorous depiction of emotions". A card in front of Gülen Adam reads, made in the Ottoman workshop. He continued the tradition of Oskan Efendi.
