= Işık Kansu =

Turkish journalist and writer

Işık Kansu (born 1956, Turhal), Turkish journalist and writer. He is the grandson of Nafi Atuf Kansu, former member of the Turkish Grand National Assembly and former Secretary General of the CHP, and the son of Ceyhun Atuf Kansu, physician, poet and writer.

== Awards ==
- 1998 - Çağdaş Gazeteciler Derneği Mustafa Ekmekçi Gazetecilik Ödülü
- 1999 - Kamu İşletmeciliğini Geliştirme Merkezi (KİGEM) Vakfı Ödülü
- 2003 - Çağdaş Gazeteciler Derneği Uğur Mumcu Araştırmacı Gazetecilik Ödülü
- 2003 - Bülent Dikmener Haber Ödülü
- 2010 - Dil Derneği Onur Ödülü
- 2012 - Türkiye Gazeteciler Cemiyeti Ödülü - commendable
- Antalya Belediyesi Uğur Mumcu Ödülü,
- Türk Tabipleri Birliği Gazetecilik Ödülü,
- Ziraat Mühendisleri Odası ve Harita ve Kadastro Mühendisleri Odası Gazetecilik Ödülü,
- Mülkiyeliler Birliği Onur Ödülü’nün de yer aldığı çeşitli ödüllere değer görüldü.
