= Apaydın =

Family name

Apaydın is a Turkish surname that may refer to the following notable people:

- Hamdi Apaydın (1862–1936), Turkish politician
- Serdar Apaydın (born 1966), Turkish basketball player and coach
- Zekai Apaydın (1884–1947), Turkish civil servant, diplomat and politician
