= Saim =

Saim is an Arabic masculine given name. Notable people with this name include:

== Given name ==
- Saim Arıkan (1906–1997), Turkish wrestler
- Saim Ayub (born 2002), Pakistani cricket player
- Saim Bugay (1934–2008), Turkish sculptor
- Saim Koca (born 1966), Turkish cross-country skier
- Saim Kokona (1934–2012), Albanian cinematographer
- Saim Polatkan (1908–1991), Turkish equestrian
- Saim Sezgin (born 2009), Turkish/German Basketball player
