= Şahap =

Şahap is a Turkish masculine given name. Notable people with the name include:

- Şahap Kavcıoğlu (born 1967), Turkish banker and politician
- Şahap Kocatopçu (1916–2012), Turkish engineer, businessman and politician
- Şahap Sıtkı (1915–1991), Turkish writer
