= 2008 Justice and Development Party closure trial =

Closure trial of a Turkish party

2008 Justice and Development Party (AKP) closure trial
- Court: Constitutional Court of Turkey
- Full case name: Chief Public Prosecutor of the Supreme Court of Appeals of Turkey, in the name of the People of the Republic of Turkey, v. Justice and Development Party
- Decided: 30 July 2008
- Transcript: Indictment (Turkish)

Court membership
- Judges sitting: Haşim Kılıç (President); Osman Alifeyyaz Paksüt; Fulya Kantarcıoğlu; Şevket Apalak; Zehra Ayla Perktaş; Mehmet Erten; Necmi Özler; Ahmet Akyalçın; Serruh Kaleli; Sacit Adalı; Serdar Özgüldür

Case opinions
- The Justice and Development Party not guilty of violating the principle of secularism. However, the party has become "a center for anti-secular activities", and the state shall only fund 50% of the party's activities, reduced from 100%.

Keywords
- Secularism, party closure

The closure trial of the ruling Justice and Development Party (AKP) of Turkey was a court case in 2008 to close the party and ban its 71 leading members from politics for five years, based on the charge that the party violated the principle of separation of religion and state in Turkey. The closure request failed by one vote, as only 6 of the 11 judges ruled in favour, with 7 required; however, 10 out of 11 judges agreed that the AKP had become "a center for anti-secular activities", leading to a loss of state funding for the party.

== Background ==
Islamic parties, which were effectively predecessors of the AKP, had been previously closed for violating the separation of religion and state, including the National Order Party (1971), National Salvation Party (1981), Welfare Party (1998) and Virtue Party (2001).

== Proceedings ==
=== Preliminary hearings ===
On 18 March 2008, documents requesting a closure trial of the ruling AKP were presented to the Constitutional Court of Turkey. On 31 May 2008, the Constitutional Court announced that it would accept the indictment of the Chief Public Prosecutor of the Supreme Court of Appeals, Abdurrahman Yalçınkaya, and hear the case concerning the closure of the party. As for banning politicians, the indictment cited 61 speeches and actions by Erdoğan, 16 for Arınç, and 10 for Gül when he was Minister of Foreign Affairs. Rapporteurs of the Constitutional Court then prepared a report for the judges to deliberate. Head rapporteur and Associate Professor Osman Can argued in his 70-page report that the documents presented to the Court should be revised; he said that the statements and evidence presented to the Court about Abdullah Gül (during his time as Foreign Minister) should be revised since Gül was now the President of Turkey.

In a rare unanimous vote, the indictment to take up the case was accepted by all of the 11 judges. The prosecutor had also asked for 71 politicians to be banned from politics for five years, including Prime Minister Recep Tayyip Erdoğan, President Abdullah Gül, and former Speaker of the Parliament Bülent Arınç. While there was disagreement on Gül, with 7 votes for and 4 against his inclusion, the other 70 names were agreed on unanimously. After close to five hours of deliberations, the 11 judges of the Constitutional Court decided in a rare unanimous ruling to take up the case for closing the AKP and banning the prime minister and dozens of lawmakers from politics. Of the 11 judges, 7 would have sufficed to close down the AKP and ban its 71 figures from politics.

The members of the Constitutional Court were:

Position	Name
President of the Constitutional Court	Haşim Kılıç
Members of the Constitutional Court	Osman Alifeyyaz Paksüt; Fulya Kantarcıoğlu; Şevket Apalak; Zehra Ayla Perktaş; Mehmet Erten; Necmi Özler; Ahmet Akyalçın; Serruh Kaleli; Sacit Adalı; Serdar Özgüldür

=== Trial ===
On 28 July 2008, 6 members voted for closure (Osman Alifeyyaz Paksüt, Fulya Kantarcıoğlu, Şevket Apalak, Zehra Ayla Perktaş, Mehmet Erten, and Necmi Özler), while 5 voted against (Haşim Kılıç, Sacit Adalı, Serruh Kaleli, Ahmet Akyalçın, and Serdar Özgüldür). The last vote was submitted two days later, after 10 members had already voted, by the President of the Constitutional Court Haşim Kılıç on 30 July 2008 at 6:00 pm. If he had voted for closure, the result would have been 7:4 for closure and the case would have succeeded. However, Kılıç voted against the closure, thus making the final vote 6:5, one short of the 7:4 needed for closure.

The second voting on the state funding of the AKP resulted in 10 out of 11 members voting to cut public funding for the party. The Court decision cut the state funding of the AKP by 50%. The only vote against cutting the funding was given by President of the Constitutional Court, Haşim Kılıç.

With only 6 members voting for a closure (7 would have been needed), the Court rejected the demands of the prosecutor and did not ban the party. The court gave its verdict on 9 July 2009 rejecting the demand, and the case against the Justice and Development Party was terminated. The European Union were relieved with the decision by Turkey's highest court not to ban the ruling AKP. Joost Lagendijk, a member of the European Parliament who works on matters regarding Turkey said: "Everybody is very happy with this decision, otherwise it would have created a hell of a situation for Turkey."

== See also ==
- 2021 Peoples' Democratic Party closure case
