= Sirel =

Family name

Sirel is an Estonian language surname meaning "lilac". Notable people with the surname include:

- Indrek Sirel (born 1970), commander of Estonian Defence Forces
- Jaanus Sirel (born 1975), Estonian footballer
- Nijat Sirel (1897–1959), Turkish sculptor
