= Birand =

Birand is a Turkish surname, and it may refer to:

- Mehmet Ali Birand (1941–2013), Turkish journalist, political commentator and writer
- Şükrü Birand (born 1944), Turkish football player
- Yusuf İzzet Birand (1902–1968), Turkish military physician, academic and politician as a senator
