= Koray Ariş =

Turkish sculptor

- Born: 1944 (age 81–82); Adana, Turkey
- Education: Istanbul State Academy of Fine Arts
- Known for: Sculpture

Koray Ariş (born in 1944) is a Turkish sculptor. He graduated from Şadi Çalıks atelier at the Istanbul State Academy of Fine Arts. He is known for his abstract sculptures made from metal, wood, leather, and other materials which have earned him a special place in Turkish sculpture.

== Biography ==
Ariş was born in 1944 in Adana, Turkey. He graduated from the atelier of Şadi Çalık at the Istanbul State Academy of Fine Arts sculpture department. Between 1969 and 1971 he worked in the sculpture atelier of Emilio Greco of the Rome University of Fine Arts. He founded his own atelier in Rome and then later in Istanbul and has participated in many personal and collaborative exhibitions.

His first solo exhibition was in Rome a year after when he opened his studio there in 1971. In the following years his works were displayed in many cities in Europe including Florence, Budapest and Belgrade. He returned to Turkey in 1975, where he started teaching at the Fine Arts Academy. After two years, he quit and left the academy, which is when he opened his Istanbul studio. For more than 25 years his works have been exhibited regularly in Istanbul and Ankara. In 2001, he designed masks for the Fire of Anatolia dance group/show, which has traveled with the show around the world since then.

The exhibition "Memory and Scale: 15 Artists of Modern Turkish Sculpture" at Istanbul Modern included works by Ariş.

== Personal exhibitions ==
- 1972 Galleria La Nuova Pesa, Rome
- 1973 Galleria L'indiano, Florence
- 1976 DGSA Osman Hamdi Salonu, Istanbul
- 1980 Galeri Bİ-Ze, Istanbul
- 1985 Maçka Sanat Galerisi, Istanbul
- 1986 Galeri Nev, Ankara
- 1988 Maçka Sanat Galerisi, Istanbul
- 1991 Galeri Nev, Ankara, Istanbul
- 1994 Galeri Nev, Istanbul
- 1998 Akbank Aksanat Galerisi, Istanbul
