= Yervant Voskan =

Ottoman sculptor and teacher (1855–1914)

Osgan Efendi Yervant Osgan Yervant Oskan Yervant Osman Efendi
- Երվանդ Հակոբի Ոսկան; Երվանդ Ոսկան
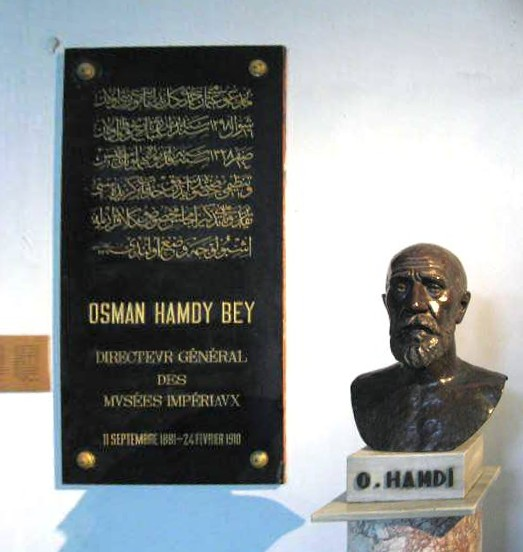
- Bust of Osman Hamdi Bey by Yervant Voskan
- Born: Yervant Voskan; 1855; Istanbul, Ottoman Empire
- Died: 1914 (aged 58–59); Istanbul, Ottoman Empire
- Known for: Sculpture, painting

Yervant Voskan (1855 in Istanbul – 1914 in Istanbul) was an Armenian painter, sculptor, instructor, and administrator. He is the first known sculptor in modern Turkish sculpture history and as the first sculpture teacher at the Sanay-i Nefise he educated the first generation of Turkish sculptors.

== Early life and studies ==
Yervant Voskan was born in 1855 in Samatya, Istanbul into an Armenian family as the son of writer Hagop Voskan (1825 – 1907). His grandfather was Voskan Gotogyan of Erzurum, a foundryman at the Imperial Mint. After receiving his primary education from his father, he attended the Catholic Makruhyan Armenian School in Beşiktaş and the Pera Hayr Ananya school. In 1866, with the support of his family, he went to Venice to study at the Moorat-Raphael College. There he was a student of Luigi Qura. Later he continued his studies in Rome at the Rome Imperial Art School as a student of Enrico Bektti and Cirolana Mazzini. In 1878 he was sent to Paris on a state scholarship to be educated in sculpture.

== Career ==
Upon his return to the Ottoman Empire in 1881 he aided in the founding of the department of sculpture at the Sanâyi-i Nefîse Mekteb-i Âlisi in 1883. It was one if the schools first departments and Voskan was its first teacher. He began teaching sculpture in the academy on March 1, 1883. At the time, he was the only professor of sculpture in the Ottoman Empire. The first time period was spent looking for students to teach as it was difficult at the time to find students who wanted to study sculpture. Eventually İhsan Özsoy, İsa Behzat, Mehmet Bahri and Mesrur Izzet would become Osgan Efendis first students and would be the first representatives of Turkish sculptors in sculpture history. In his 32 years at the school, Oskan would teach the first generation of Turkish sculptors. Voskan is credited with educating the first generation of sculptors of the Republic of Turkey.

=== Archeological work ===
Along with Osman Hamdi Bey, Voskan conducted the first scientific based archaeological in the history of the Ottoman Empire. His archaeological research included the Commagene tomb-sanctuary in Nemrut Dağı in south-eastern Anatolia and the Alexander Sarcophagus in Sidon. He was the chief restorer of the Sarcophagus.

=== Retirement and death ===
Yervant Voskan eventually retired from the academy in 1908 and died only 6 years later.
