= Nursen Güven =

Turkish artist

- Education: Mimar Sinan Fine Arts University
- Spouse: Güvenç Güven

Nursen Güven is a Turkish artist. She is Turkey's first and only female muralist. Her husband is Güvenç Güven, one of the most important representatives of İznik Çini. She teaches at Haliç Çini Merkezi and Ayvansaray Eğitim Birimi. In 1995 she and her husband opened their own workshop.

== Education ==
In 1972 she entered and in 1980 graduated from the industrial design department of the State Fine Arts Academy. After this, due to her interest in traditional Turkish arts, she entered into the Traditional Turkish Arts Department at the Mimar Sinan University. There she was educated in calligraphy, tezhib, miniature, Çini, Klasik Cilt, Carpet/Rug and old cloth patterns. In 1985 she graduated with a masters in Klasik Cilt.

She received her calligraphy education from Hattat Mahmut Öncü and Emin Barın and also learned from Hasan Çelebi and Ali Alparslan. She was educated in illumination by Tahsin Aykutalp. She was educated in miniature by Neşe Aybey and klasik cilt by İslam Seçen and carpetry by Yusuf Durul and drawing by Aydın Uğurlu.

== Exhibitions ==
- 1988 - Beyoğlu Municipality Art Gallery
- 1989 - Yapı Kredi Bank Beyoğlu Gallery Collaborative Exhibition
- 1990 - Basın Museum Art Gallery
- 1991 - Konya Dostlar Group Exhibition
- 1996 - Aniques and Art Fair at the Swiss Hotel
