= Kemal Atatürk Memorial, Canberra =

War memorial in Canberra, Australia

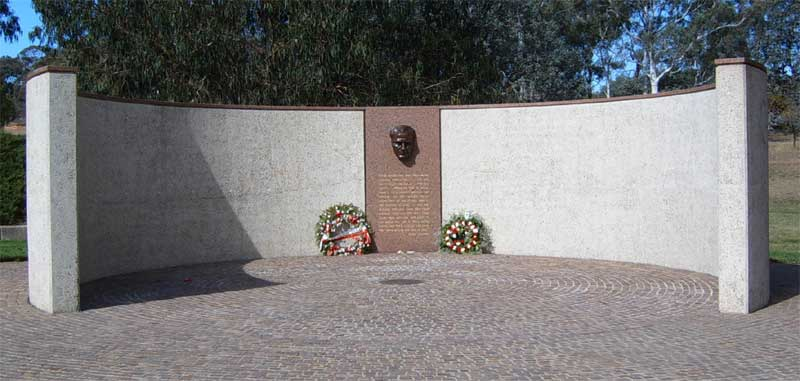
- Kemal Atatürk Memorial in Canberra.
- Interactive map of Kemal Atatürk Memorial, Canberra
- Location: Canberra, Australia
- Coordinates: 35.283°S 149.148°E
- Designer: PDCM Pty Ltd
- Material: Granite
- Completion date: 1985

The Kemal Atatürk Memorial is a memorial directly opposite the Australian War Memorial on Anzac Parade, the principal memorial and ceremonial parade in Canberra, the capital of Australia.

It is named after Mustafa Kemal Atatürk (1881–1938) who, as a Lieutenant Colonel, commanded the Ottoman 19th Infantry Division when it resisted the Australian and New Zealand Army Corps (ANZAC) at Arı Burnu on the Gallipoli peninsula in 1915 during World War I. He started the Turkish War of Independence, and went on to be the founder of the Republic of Turkey and its first president, receiving the honorific Atatürk ("Father of the Turks") by the Turkish parliament.

In 1985, seventy years after the Gallipoli Campaign, the Turkish Government recognised the name "Anzac Cove" for the place on the peninsula where the Australian and New Zealand troops landed on 25 April 1915.

In return for this gesture, the Australian Government established the memorial garden, around the Kemal Atatürk Memorial, that honours the heroism and self-sacrifice of the Turkish and Anzac soldiers who took part in that bitterly fought campaign. This is the only memorial to an enemy commander on Anzac Parade.

== Design ==
The memorial consists of a crescent shaped wall on a circular paved area. The form of the wall reflects the crescent moon and five-pointed star of the Turkish flag. In the centre of the memorial is a time capsule containing soil from the battlefields of Gallipoli. It was designed originally by architecture firm PDCM.

Centrally located in the wall is a bronze likeness of Atatürk – a gift of the Turkish government by Turkish sculptor Hüseyin Gezer. The inscription, attributed to Atatürk, pays tribute to his former foes and reflects his understanding of the cost of war:

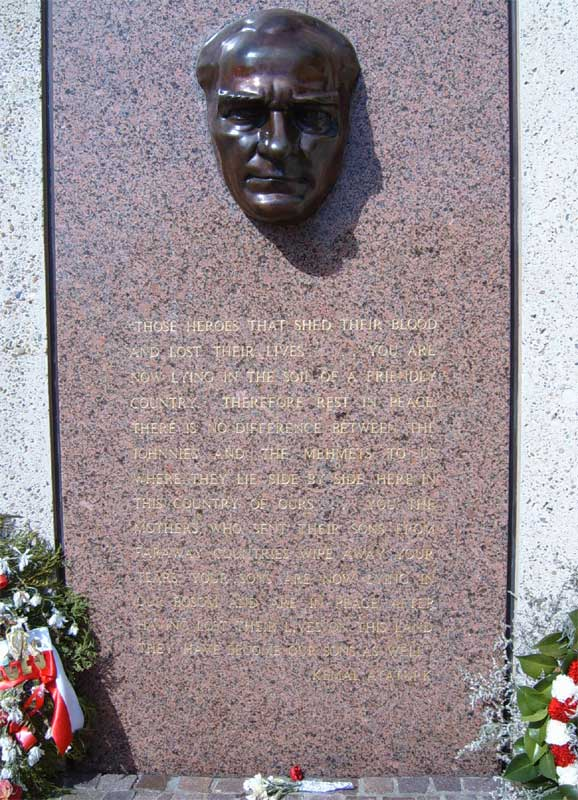
Bust of Mustafa Kemal Atatürk with inscription of his words.

Those heroes that shed their blood and lost their lives... you are now lying in the soil of a friendly country. Therefore, rest in peace. There is no difference between the Johnnies and the Mehmets to us where they lie side by side here in this country of ours... You the mothers who sent their sons from far away countries wipe away your tears. Your sons are now lying in our bosom and are in peace. After having lost their lives on this land they have become our sons as well.

The quote is supposed to honour all former enemy soldiers who have died in Turkey. However, the quote is fake. Atatürk never said this, it was made up by Şükrü Kaya for diplomatic reasons. In fact, Atatürk considered the ANZACs to have been invaders and considered them morally inferior to the Turks.

Surrounding the memorial are pine trees Pinus halepensis grown from seed collected from the Gallipoli lone pine.

== 2007 refurbishment ==
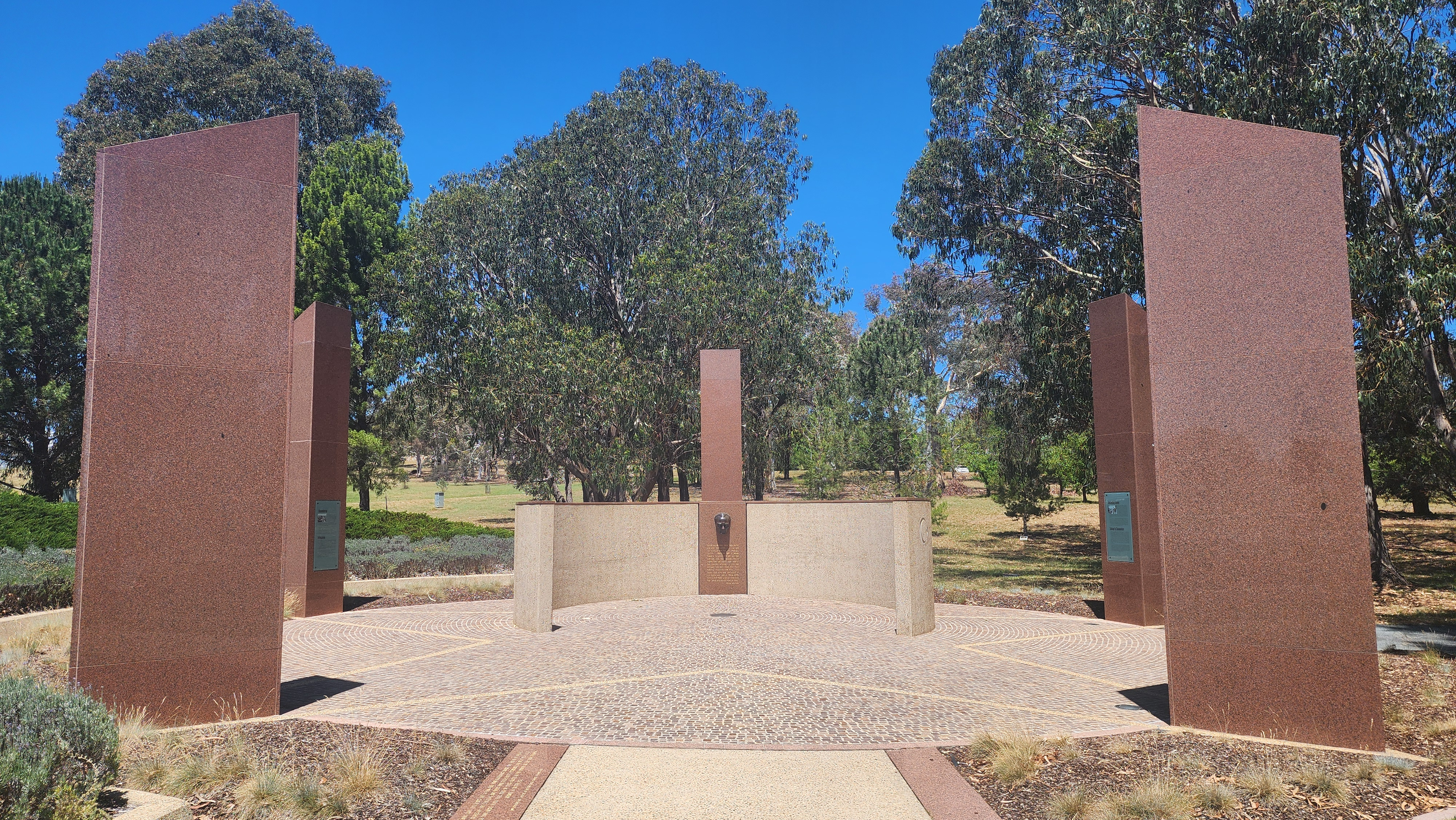
Memorial, after refurbishment in 2007

The memorial was refurbished in 2007 and rededicated in time for Anzac Day (25 April). The pavement was altered to incorporate a larger five pointed star motif as used in the flag of Turkey, to match the existing wall in the form of the crescent moon. At the points of the star five pink-granite columns matching the granite used for the central sculpture. The columns are lit at night. The flags were moved from the side to the front of the memorial. The memorial was designed by PDCM Pty Ltd.

== See also ==
- Atatürk monuments and memorials
