= Saim Bugay =

Turkish sculptor

Saim Bugay (1934–2008) was a Turkish sculptor.

== Life ==
=== Early life and education ===
He was born in 1934 in Mersin, Turkey. He attended the Istanbul State Fine Arts Academy from 1962 to 1967 and was educated in the studio of Şadi Çalık.

=== Building experience in Europe ===
Between 1969 and 1975 he traveled though Europe and took this opportunity to study and examine wood sculpture in the different countries he visited. In France on a state scholarship he had master classes on tree sculptures.

=== Teaching ===
He taught at the Istanbul State Fine Arts Academy from 1975 till he retired in 2002.

=== Death ===
He died in 2008 in Istanbul and was buried in the Zincirlikuyu Cemetery.

== Works ==
His first abstract sculptures which he made from working iron. In his tree sculptures he showed importance to a symmetric fetish or emblem. He conveyed different messages in his sculptures. He is considered to be one of the successful representatives of the middle class in this field.

His works can be found in the İstanbul State Art and Sculpture Museum as well as in private collections in Turkey and abroad.

=== Some of his works include ===
- Uzay (1967), İstanbul State Art and Sculpture Museum
- Güneş (1968), İstanbul State Art and Sculpture Museum
- Sazçalan (1968), İstanbul State Art and Sculpture Museum
- Güneş 21 (1970), France
- Çocuklar (1983)

== Exhibitions ==
He had 10 personal exhibitions. Seven were in France and three were in Turkey. He also participated in collaborative exhibitions.

== Awards ==
In 1969 he won the first place award in the sculpture division of State Painting and Sculpture Exhibition.

== Sources ==
- Kuzucular, Şahamettin (25 June 2012). "Saim Bugay". edebiyatvesanatakademisi.com. Edebiyat ve Sanat Akademisi.
- ÖZALP, Feyza (30 July 2015). "SAİM BUGAY VE ÇAĞDAŞ HEYKEL SANATIMIZA KAZANDIRDIKLARI". bilenlerdenol.wordpress.com.
