= Hüseyin Gezer =

Turkish sculptor

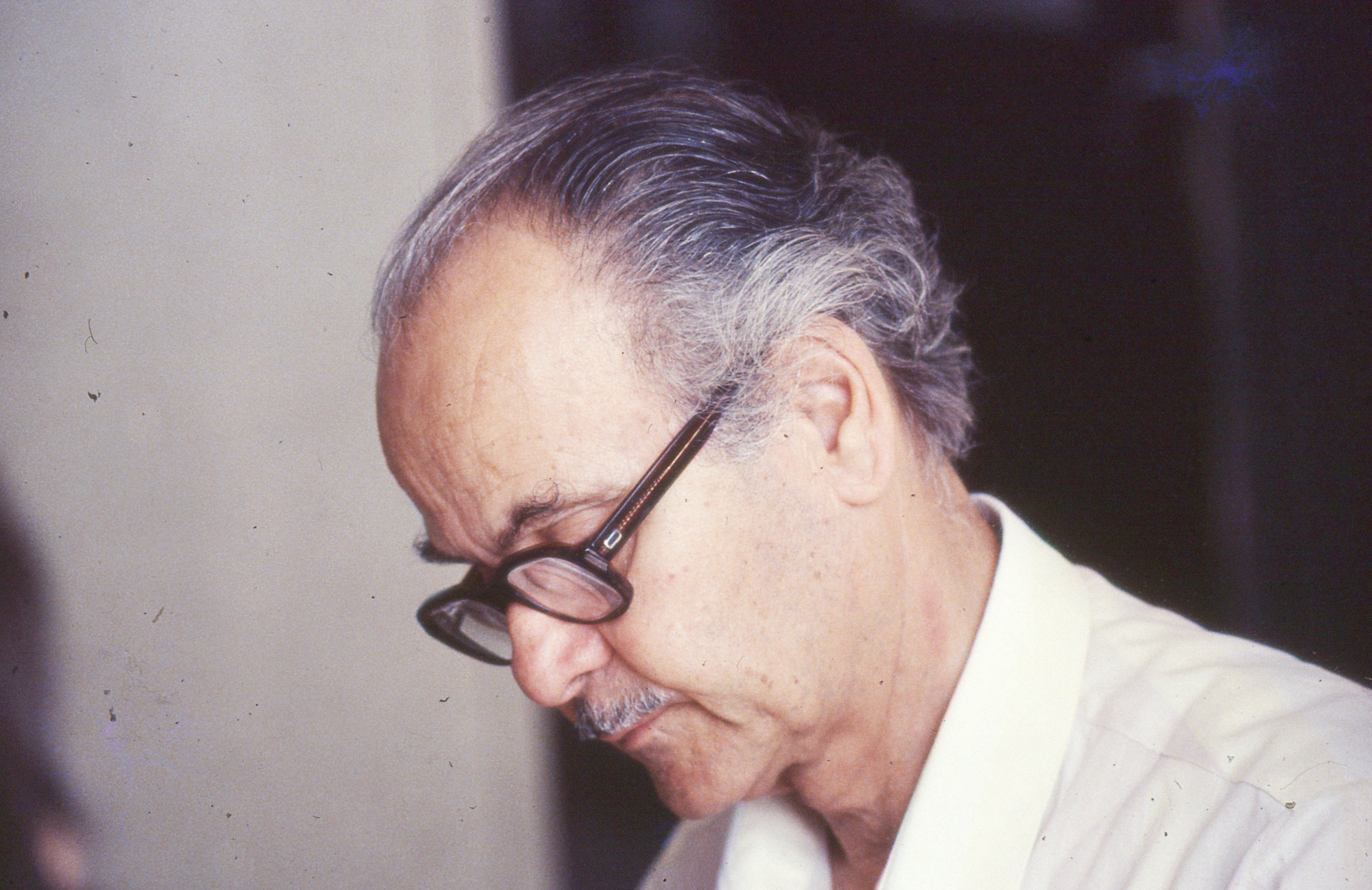
- Born: 1920; Mut, Mersin, Ottoman Empire
- Died: 27 August 2013 (aged 92–93); Istanbul, Turkey
- Education: Istanbul Academy of Fine Arts
- Known for: Sculpture

Hüseyin Gezer (1920 – 27 December 2013), was a Turkish sculptor.

He was born at Kıravga village of Mut district in Mersin Province in a village 1920.

He attended elementary school in Mut, middle school in Silifke and graduated from Necatibey Pedagogical School in Balıkesir in 1940. After a year of teaching, he completed his military service. The Minister of National Education Hasan Âli Yücel decreed that his mandatory service be postponed, and ensured that he could attend the Sculpture Department of Istanbul Academy of Fine Arts in 1944. He became a student of Rudolf Belling, and graduated in 1948.

Gezer went to Paris, France on a scholarship, and at worked at the studio of Prof. Marcel Gimond (1894–1961) in the Julian Academy. After going back home, he returned to the Fine Arts Academy as assistant in the Sculpture Department in 1950. He served as a teacher of modeling and patterning of sculpture and ceramics, studio teacher, assistant director, director and finally department head. Also between 1969 and 1976, he was a director at the Istanbul Painting and Sculpture Museum. In accordance with the new law surrounding educational institutions, he received the title of "professor".

== Works ==
His main works are:

- Türbanlı Kadın (Turbanned woman)
- Çıplak Kadın (Naked woman)
- Çocuk ve Ana (Child and Mother)
- Efe'nin Aşkı
- Köprülü Mehmet Paşa bust
- Atlılar
- Yahya Kemal Head
- Yahya Kemal Sculpture (1968) (Beşiktaş Yahya Kemal Park)
- Atatürk Head bust (Displayed at the Atatürk Monument in Canberra)
- Geyve, Karabük, Akhisar, Balıkesir, Antalya, Polatlı, Atatürk monuments
- Mut Karacaoğlan Statue
- Police Martyrs Monument (Ankara)
- 50. Years Atatürk busts (2 first place awards in the contest)
- Torch-wielding Atatürk bust at the Bilkent University Entrance

== Sources ==
- Şahamettin Kuzucular (29 December 2012). "Heykelci Prof. Hüseyin Gezer Hayatı ve Heykelleri". edebiyatvesanatakademisi.com.
- "Hüseyin Gezer". biyografiya.com.
- "Hüseyin Gezer Kimdir?". nkfu.com. 15 January 2018.
