= Alev Demirkesen =

Turkish artist

- Alev Demirkesen
- Born: 1964 (age 61–62); Istanbul
- Education: Neşe Aybey (miniature); Tahsin Aykutalp (tezhip); Mimar Sinan Fine Arts University
- Movement: Traditional Turkish Arts

Alev Demirkesen (born 1964 in Istanbul), is a Turkish artist who works in the field of Turkish decorative arts. Her works include ceramic decoration, miniature and illumination.

She believes that when something breaks it is no longer of the same value.

== Early life and education ==
Alev Demirkesen was born in 1964 in Istanbul. She attended the Mimar Sinan University, Department of Fine Arts and eventually graduated from there. She did her masters in the same department at the same university.

She was educated in the Turkish decorative arts of miniature, illumination (Tezhip), drawing and ceramic decorations. She received education of these arts inside and outside the university from Neşe Aybey, Tahsin Aykutalp, Emin Barın, Cahide Keskiner and Kerim Silivrli.

== Career ==
In 2003, she started teaching at the Sakarya University, in the Traditional Turkish Arts Department.

== Exhibitions ==
Demirkesen has participated in group exhibitions both in Turkey and internationally and has also held personal exhibitions.

=== Personal exhibitions ===
- 1st Personal Exhibition:
- 2nd Personal Exhibition:
- 3rd Personal Exhibition:
- 4th Personal Exhibition:
- 5th Personal Exhibition:
- 6th Personal Exhibition: Gökyüzü Mektupları, Ramada Istanbul Asia Hotel Art Gallery (22-29 March) 2019
- 7th Personal Exhibition: Reng - i Ahenk, Ramada Istanbul Asia Hotel Art Gallery (26 January 2020) 2020
- Alev Demirkesen Solo Sergi 2021

=== Collaboration exhibitions ===
- Bahar-ı Alem, Sakarya University, (-3 April) 2022
