= Kerime Nadir =

Turkish novelist and author (1917–1984)

Kerime Nadir Azrak
- Born: 5 February 1917; Istanbul, Ottoman Empire
- Died: 20 March 1984 (aged 67); Istanbul, Turkey
- Education: Saint Joseph High School
- Occupation: Novelist

Kerime Nadir Azrak (5 February 1917 – 20 March 1984) was a Turkish novelist and author.

== Life ==
Kerime Nadir was born in Istanbul, Ottoman Empire on 5 February 1917. Her father was a financial officer Nadir Azrak. She graduated from the French St. Joseph High School in İstanbul in 1935. In addition, she took private lessons. She married twice, each lasted briefly. She spent the summer months in her youth years at her aunts' mansions in Beylerbeyi and Çamlıca.

She died of cancer in Maçka Palace Hotel, where she resided, on 20 March 1984.

== Writing career ==
She began her literary career by publishing her poems and short stories in the periodicals Servet-i Fünun ("Wealth of Knowledge"), Uyanış ("Awakening") and Yarım Ay ("The Half Moon") in 1937. The same year, her novel Yeşil Işıklar ("Green Lights") was published. Later, her stories and novels with the genre of love and romance were serialized in the publications Yedigün ("Seven Days"), Aydabir ("The Monthly") and Hayat ("Life"). She made her popular fame with her emotional love novels.

Her novel Hıçkırık ("Sob"), published in 1938, became one of the most popular novels of its time. She became one of the best-selling fiction authors of the Republican era. At her death, 40 of her 67 novels were printed in over 200 editions, and were sold in more than five million copies. Her novel Posta Güvercini ("The Carrier Pigeon") was translated into French. About 30 of her novels were adopted into screenplays for cinema and television serials.

In general, the female heroes of her novels came out as the characters, who did not understand the giddy, dizzy and self-love men. The women were characters, who did not love herself and others, were in unrequited love and upset men, or drifted as were very easily deceived by men. The men were characterized as friendly, romantic and emotional.

== Criticism ==
She was criticized for writing about wealthy people, and being ignorant to social problems. But on the other hand, according to some critics, she helped to raise the reading habit in Turkey.

== Her novels ==
Her works are the following. Unless otherwise specified, they are all novels.

- 1937 – Yeşil Işıklar
- 1938 – Hıçkırık
- 1939 – Günah Bende mi?
- 1940 – Seven Ne Yapmaz
- 1941 – Gönül Hırsızı
- 1943 – Sonbahar
- 1943 – Gelinlik Kız
- 1943 – Mücrim (Short stories)
- 1945 – Uykusuz Geceler
- 1945 – Aşka Tövbe
- 1946 – Kahkaha
- 1946 – Balayı
- 1948 – Ormandan Yapraklar
- 1948 – O Gün Gelecek mi?
- 1949 – Aşk Rüyası
- 1950 – Posta Güvercini
- 1953 – Ruh Gurbetinde
- 1955 – Pervane
- 1956 – Son Hıçkırık
- 1957 – Kırık Hayat
- 1957 – Esir Kuş
- 1958 – Sonbahar
- 1959 – Aşk Bekliyor
- 1960 – Gümüş selvi
- 1962 – Boş Yuva
- 1962 – Bir Aşkın Romanı
- 1963 – Dehşet Gecesi
- 1964 – Suya Düşen Hayal
- 1966 – Mücrim (short stories)
- 1966 – Saadet Tacı
- 1967 – Sisli Hatıralar
- 1972 – Güller ve Dikenler
- 1973 – Zambaklar Açarken
- 1973 – Karar Gecesi
- 1973 – Dert Bende
- 1976 – Kaderin Sırrı
- 1979 – Bir Çatı Altında
- 1981 – Romancının Dünyası (autobiography)
