= İsa Behzat =

Turkish sculptor

İsa Behzat Bey
- Born: 1875; Üsküdar, Constantinople, Ottoman Empire
- Died: 1916 (aged 40–41); Constantinople, Ottoman Empire
- Known for: Sculpture, oil painting, porcelain works

İsa Behzat Bey (1875–1916) was a Turkish sculptor. He is known for his portraits, busts and reliefs, and being one of the art forms first Turkish practicers. He was an important pioneer in the field of fine arts leading up to the Foundation of the Turkish Republic.

== Biography ==
İsa Behzat was born in 1875 in Üsküdar, Constantinople, the son of composer Haydar Bey. In 1893 he started to attend the Sanâyi-i Nefîse Mektebi, known today as the Mimar Sinan Fine Arts University, and graduated in 1898 from the department of sculpture. Afterwards he became a painting teacher in İzmir and worked in the "Evkaf Fen Heyeti" on studying old works and artifacts. He also worked as a painting teacher in Kavala and then in 1913 he became the head of the Yıldız Porselen Fabrikası or Yıldız Porcelain Factory. Apart from sculpting he also showed interest in theater from time to time. He also has a theater creation named Yıldırım Bayezit.

Some of his notable works include:

- Saz Şairi (plaster)
- Yahudi (plaster relief) a.k.a. "Kitap Okuyan Yahudi", Istanbul Painting and Sculpture Museum
- Sakallı Adam Başı (sculpture), Istanbul Painting and Sculpture Museum
- the bust of Sultan Abdülaziz (plaster)

He was one of Turkish sculptor Osgan Efendi's first students. He was influenced by Osgan Efendi but also had his own naturalist and strong expression in his works.

== Sources ==
- Çoker, A. (1983). Osman Hamdi ve Sanayi-i Nefise Mektebi.
