= Jale Yılmabaşar =

Turkish painter and ceramicist

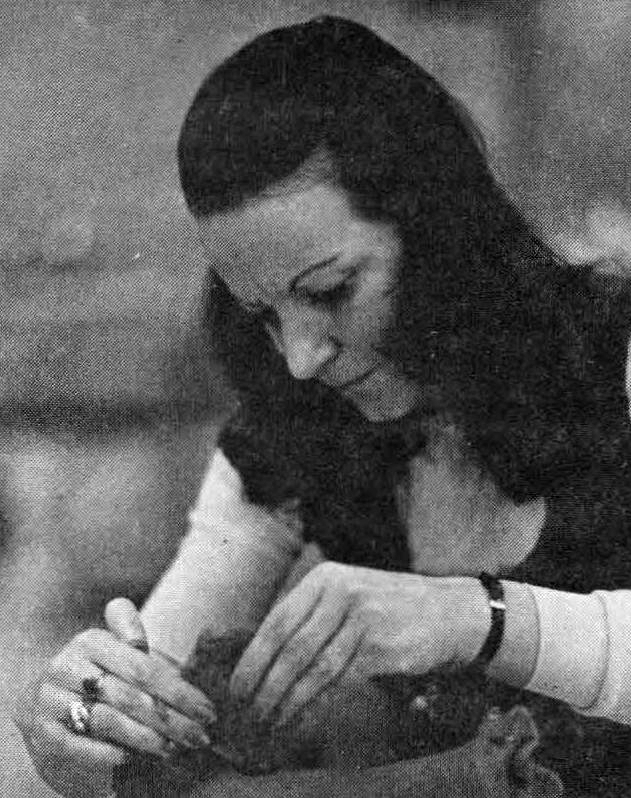
- Yılmabaşar circa 1974
- Born: 1939 (age 85–86); Samsun, Turkey

Jale Yılmabaşar (born in Samsun, Turkey, 1939) is a Turkish painter and ceramicist.

== Early life and education ==
Yılmabaşar was born in 1939 in Samsun, Turkey. Yılmabaşar's career as a ceramic artist began while studying in the United States at Albany Union High School under an AFS scholarship. In addition to ceramics and painting, Yılmabaşar also studied ballet for a large portion of her life. After high school, Yılmabaşar returned to Turkey, where she studied ceramics at the State Academy of Fine Arts and the Istanbul Graduate School of Practical Fine Arts. She also studied painting and graphic design at Munich Academy. She graduated from the Department of Ceramic, School of Practical Fine Arts in the year 1962. After graduation she held internship in the Arzberg Schonwald Ceramic Factory in Germany. Yılmabaşar also lectured at the University of Miami for one year in 1964. She served as a professor at Marmara University for many years.

== Exhibitions ==
Yılmabaşar held art exhibitions all over the world. Her first personal exhibition, "Jale's Roosters" was held in 1963. After this, she went on to open and attend exhibitions in Paris, Munich, London, and Moscow, among other places. Because of her work, Yılmabaşar was called upon to create many ceramic panels for hotels and institutes worldwide. In 1968, she was awarded a gold medal in the International Ceramic Competition in Italy, In 1969 she received a gold metal at the International Handcrafts Fair in Germany. She was also elected as one of the six best ceramic artists in the world in 1972.

In 1998, she received the title "State Artist" from the Ministry of Culture of Turkey. One year later, she opened the most inclusive exhibition of her work, "15 years with Pictures", in which she showed fifteen years of her art and ceramic work. This exhibition was held in the Istanbul Atatürk Culture Center.
