= Ümmiye Koçak =

Turkish woman (born 1957)

- Born: 1957 (age 68–69); Çelemli, Adana Province, Turkey
- Occupations: Screenwriter, drama actress
- Years active: 2001 – present
- Awards: New York Eurasian Film Festival (2013) and many others

Ümmiye Koçak (born in 1957) is a Turkish screenwriter and actress.

== Biography ==
She was born in the village of Çelemli of Adana Province in 1957. She completed the primary school in her village. But she couldn't pursue education further. After marriage in 1982, she moved to Arslanköy, a small settlement in Mersin Province, where she still lives. Arslanköy is a mountainous settlement in the Toros Mountains about 50 km (31 mi) north of Mersin. She is the mother of three.

== Theatre and movie career ==
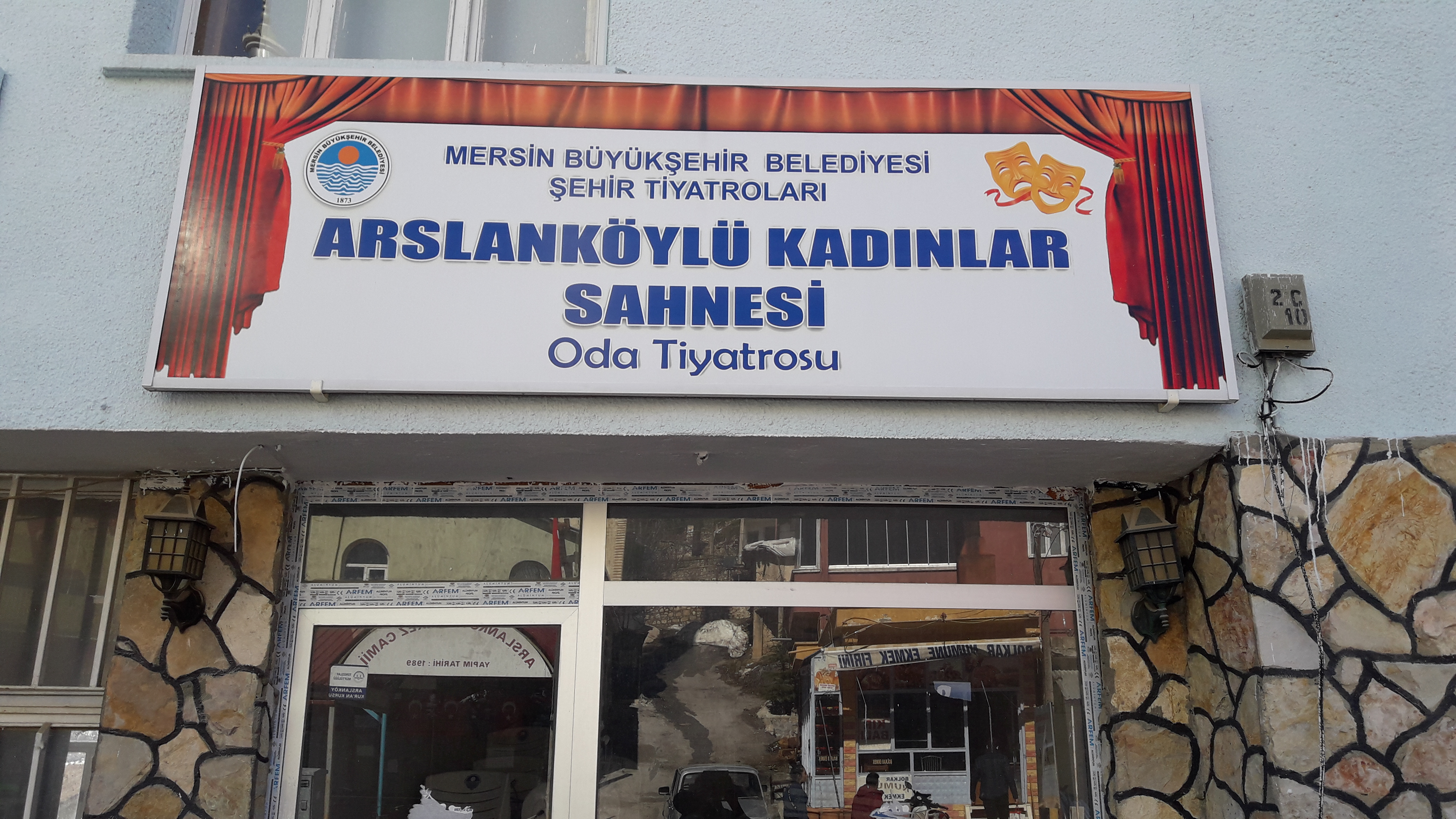
Arslanköy theatre, 2020

Although insufficiently educated, she was fond of reading. In 2001, she established a women's theatre named Arslanköy Kadınlar Tiyatro Grubu ("Arslanköy Women's Theatre Group") in her small town. In 2006, the group participated in the International Sabancı Theater Festival in Adana.

She then wrote a movie screenplay named Yün Bebek ("The Woolen Doll") about the life of the village women. She also directed the film, which earned her fame. In 2013, the film participated in the 2nd New York Eurasian Film Festival and was awarded. She later played in television serials. The plot reflects the tragedy of a village woman named Hatice and her daughter Elif. Hatice's second husband Ali and especially Ali's mother continually abuse Hatice and Elif. Elif, who suffers oppression, gets relief when she finds a woolen doll. Ayşe Armut, Öznur Armut and Seher Cuvadir starred in the film. There is no male character in the film except for a silhouette in one scene. The debut of the film was during the 49th International Antalya Film Festival in 2012 as a non-competing film. Later, the film was also televised in the television channel Turkish Radio and Television Corporation (TRT).

In 2017, she participated in a television commercial of Turk Telecom with the Portuguese footballer Cristiano Ronaldo.

== Select works ==
=== Screenplays ===
- Erik Eşkisi
- Ozon Tapakası
- Kara Kuyu
- Doktor Beleş
- Turunçgil Hayattır
- Çicekler Solmasın
- Hasret Çiçekleri

=== Short stories ===
- Vatan Sevgisi
- Irazca’nın Düşleri
- Kanayan Yara
- Kader
- Obruk
- Ayaksız Ayakta Durmak
- Baba Ben Geldim
- Muhtar Adayı Hasret Ana.

== TV serials participations ==
- İstanbul Hanımın Çiftliği
- Hayat Devam Ediyor
- Hanımın Çiftliği
- Kasaba
- Seher Vakti.

== Awards ==
- Adana International Theatre Award
- Ankara International Theatre Award
- Darüşşafaka Education Initiatrive Award
- Bornova International Woman Artists festival Award
- Toros Koleji Education Award
- Kader NGO Oppose to Violence to women Award
- Mersin Industrialist and Business People Annual Art Award
- TİKAV- 2012 Mother's School Award
- Samsun NGO Initiative Award
- New York Eurasian Film Festival Award
