= Kamuran Gürün =

Turkish diplomat (1924–2004)

Kamuran Gürün (1924 – 20 July 2004) was a Turkish diplomat.

Kamuran Gürün was born in Istanbul in 1924. He studied at Galatasaray High School's School of Political Science and at Ankara University's Faculty of Political Sciences. In 1948, he entered the Foreign Ministry. After serving in various internal and external posts of the Ministry, he was appointed Assistant Secretary-General for Economic Affairs, serving between 1963-1967. In addition, he was appointed to the newly established Inter-Ministerial Economic Committee of the General Secretariat.

In 1967 he was appointed as ambassador to Bucharest. In the same year he married Gencay Gurun. In 1970 he became a member of the OECD Permanent Delegation. In 1972, he was appointed to the Turkish Embassy in Athens. In 1976 he returned to the headquarters of the High Counsel. In 1978 he was appointed as Secretary General of CENTO, and then as the Secretary General of Ministry of Foreign Affairs in 1980 (Counsellor).

He retired in 1982, voluntarily. He got frequently involved in radio and television between the years 1984-86. He held appointments on the Faculty of Political Sciences in Ankara (1983–85), followed by Marmara University Institute in the European Community (1986), giving lectures on Revolutionary History and Turkish Foreign Policy. Between 1986-1994 he wrote a column in the newspaper Hürriyet on foreign policy. He is also the author of The Armenian File: The Myth of Innocence Exposed, in which he denies the Armenian genocide.

He died on 20 July 2004, aged 80 and was buried in Zincirlikuyu Cemetery.
