= Gencay Gürün =

Turkish art director, diplomat and politician

Personal details
- Born: 1932 (age 93–94) Istanbul, Turkey
- Party: True Path Party (DYP)
- Other political affiliations: Democrat Turkey Party
- Spouse: Kamuran Gürün (married 1967–2004)
- Education: Ankara University School of Law, London School of Economics
- Occupation: Diplomat, art director, theatre owner, politician

Şekibe Gençay Gürün (born 1932) is a Turkish art director, diplomat and politician.

== Early years ==
Gencay Gürün was born to Fahri and his spouse Naime in Istanbul in 1932. She graduated from Lycée Français Sainte Pulchérie Istanbul, Lycée Notre Dame de Sion Istanbul and the School of Law of Ankara University. She went to England for a Master's degree in International relations and Diplomacy at the London School of Economics. She returned to Turkey and began serving in the Foreign Ministry. She served in the Common Market Department and later was appointed consul in Paris, France. In 1967, she married Kamuran Gürün (1924–2004), an ambassador and abandoned her diplomatic career. Due to her husband's occupation, she stayed in Bucharest, Romania and Athens, Greece.

== Theatre ==
In 1976, the couple returned to Ankara, and in 1979 Gencay Gürün began serving in the Turkish State Theatres as the secretary general and the chief dramaturge. In 1984, she moved to Istanbul to serve as general art director of Istanbul City Theatres. In 1994, she retired from the public service. The next year, Gürün founded her own theatre "Tiyatro İstanbul". In her theatre, she was both a translator and director.

== Politics and later ==
Gürün joined the True Path Party (DYP), and by the 1995 general election held on 24 December, she was elected as a deputy from İzmir Province in the 20th Parliament. However, on 19 October 1996, she resigned from her political party. Although she briefly joined the Democrat Turkey Party (DTP) on 14 July 1997, she chose to be independent on 12 November 1998. She did not run for a seat in the parliament in the next term.

Her husband died in 2004. She is currently a member of High Commission of the Press Council.

== Director ==
She directed the following plays:

- Pierrette Bruno: Le Charimari (Turkish: Çılgın Sonbahar )
- Bernard Slade: Same Time, Next Year (Turkish: Seneye Bugün)
- Pierre Barillet and Jean-Pierre Gredy: Lily & Lily ( Turkish: Çetin Ceviz)
- Pierre Barillet and Jean-Pierre Gredy: Peaux de vaches (Turkish: Acaba Hangisi)
- Oscar Wilde: An Ideal Husband (Turkish: İdeal Bir Koca)
- Neil Simon: Chapter Two (Turkish: Yeni Baston)
- Neil Simon: The Odd Couple (Female Version) (Turkish: Tuhaf Bir Çift)
- Jasmina Reza: Art (Turkish: Sanat)
- A. R. Gurney: Sylvia
- Marc Camoletti: Pyjamas Pour Six (Turkish: Çılgın Haftasonu)
- Kressmann Taylor: Address Unknown (Turkish: Adreste Bulunamadı)

== Awards ==
- Chevalier des Arts et des Lettres from the French Government
- Honorary doctorate from Boğaziçi University
- Avni Dilligil The Best Director Award
- The Woman of the Year by the Turkish Women Association
- Muhsin Ertuğrul Special Prize
