= Füruzan İkincioğulları =

President of the 6th division
- In office 15 February 1990 – 30 March 1994
- Preceded by: Süleyman Türkoğlu
- Succeeded by: Gürbüz Önbilgin

President of the Council of State
- In office 30 March 1994 – 4 February 1998
- Preceded by: Hüseyin Metin Güven
- Succeeded by: Erol Çırakman

Personal details
- Born: February 4, 1933 (age 93) Ödemiş, İzmir Province, Turkey
- Education: Ankara University, Law School
- Profession: Jurist

Fürüzan İkincioğulları (born 4 February 1933) is a high-level jurist and the first female President of the Council of State in Turkey.

Fürüzan İkincioğullar was born in Ödemiş ilçe (district) of İzmir Province on 4 February 1933. She graduated from the Law School of Ankara University in 1957. On 25 December 1958, she was appointed to the Council of State. On 13 April 1974, she was elected member of the council board. On 15 February 1990, İkincioğulları was elected as the president of the Council of State's 6th Division. On 30 March 1994, she was elected as the president of Council of State. She retired on 4 February 1998.

İkincioğulları was the first president of the Council of State. After İkincioğulları, two other women were also served as the president, Sumru Çörtoğlu (2006–2008) and Zerrin Güngör (2013–present).

Court offices
Preceded by Hüseyin Metin Güven	President of the Council of State; 30 March 1994 – 4 February 1998	Succeeded by Erol Çırakman
