= Nezihe Bilgütay Derler =

Turkish miniaturist

- Born: Nezihe Bilgütay; 1926 (age 99–100); Heybeliada
- Education: Istanbul Girls High School; State Fine Arts Academy
- Known for: Çinitr:Çini
- Spouse: Haşım Derler

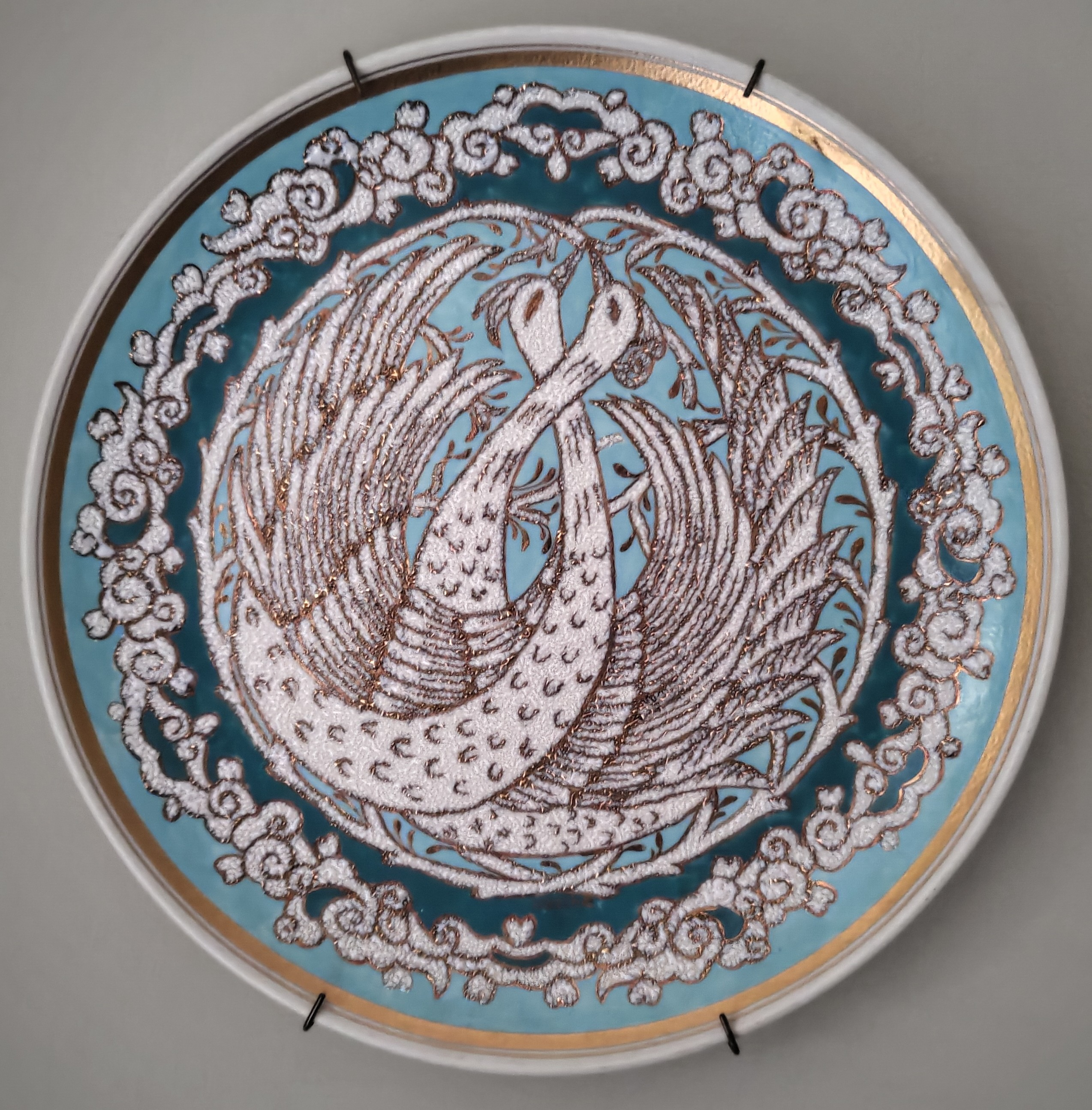
Çini made by Derler

Nezihe Bilgütay Derler (born 1926 on Heybeli Ada) is a Turkish miniaturist, known for her Çini, a traditional Turkish artform made on a layer of fusion between glass and porcelain. Her Çini patterns are widely used.

Derler learned the artform at the Academy of Fine Arts, from its first teachers of the republican era, Feyzullah Dayigil (1910–1949) and Muhsin Demironat (1920–1983), who themselves were pivotal in the 20th century rediscovery of the forgotten logic in the patterns of the traditional Çini artform. Derler passed on this knowledge to the next generation of artists, through her lessons and produced exemplars of Çini art.

She taught the art of Çini as an educator at the Mimar Sinan Fine Arts University. She played an important part in the development of the Çini artform in Turkey from where it was to the state that it is in today. She taught the next generation of Çini artists such as Mehmet Gürsoy. She continues to teach outside the university after her retirement.

"In Bilgütays' work one will come across many miniature like compositions as she is a graduate of the miniature main art branch. One will also see the combination of underglazed, bossed and overglazed in her ceramic exemplars ranging from panels to plates and vases".

— Sitare Turan

== Personal life ==
Nezihe Bilgütay Derler was born in 1926 on Heybeliada, of the Princes' Islands as one of a few siblings. Her father, who was a sailor, died when she was just 6 months old. When she was 10 years old, her mother died, leaving her without any parents. She and her siblings were subsequently raised by their maternal aunt. Money was tight during her youth, she had to work while attending Istanbul Girls High School to make ends meet. After graduating from high school she was directed to the Istanbul Fine Arts Academy by a teacher who saw potential in her.

At the academy she was a student in the Department of Turkish Ornamentation. She majored in miniature taught by the Tabriz born Hussein Tahirzade Behzad (1887–1962) who taught at the academy from 1947 till his death in 1963. She also minored in tezhip (Ottoman illumination) which was taught by Muhsin Demironat (1907–1983). She was classmates with Neşe Aybey (1930–2015). She graduated from the academy in 1957.

== Career ==
From 1952 to 1960 she Derler worked on map paintings.

In 1960 she worked in a İznik style underglazed decor atelier with Muhsin Demironat, and ceramic artists Melike Abasıyanık (1930–2021), Şükran Ölcen and Nasip İyem (1921–2011).

Until 1966 she worked on Çini application, ceramic moulds and reliefs in Eczacıbaşı Arts Ateliers' factory in Kartal, Istanbul. She received offers from Yıldız Porcelain to come work there but relented and stayed at Eczacıbaşı until they rebuffed their offer and accepted to let her to work on whatever and whichever way she wants which finally convinced her to leave Eczacıbaşı for Yıldız Porcelain.

From 1966 to 1975 she was the chief of the workshop at the Sumerbank Yıldız Porcelain Industries hand crafts atelier. The graphical designs of the products produced by tr:Yıldız Porselen Fabrikası Yıldız Porcelain were all designed by Derler between those years.

In 1967, together with Muhsin Demironat she made a panel with miniatures which won the silver medal at the International Ceramics Exhibition and Competition which was later bought by the now defunct Senate of the Republic of Turkey.

Starting part time in 1976 Derler eventually became a full time teacher at the Çini main art branch in Department of Traditional Turkish Arts at the Istanbul Academy of Fine Arts where she was a teacher until 1997

In 2005 Derler moved to Bodrum. After the death of her partner Haşım Derler she moved to İzmir.

Much of Derlers work is on display at her home in İzmir and the rest is in private collections across the world. The most of her work in a single place is likely in the collection of businessman Necip Tatari who was enthousiastic about art, he made a building specially for housing the works that Derler made from him, mostly panels.

Although a trained miniaturist she is most regarded for her Çini however her training as a miniaturist does come to light in her Çini designs.

== Exhibitions ==
- Mehmet Akif Ersoy Sanat Merkezi, 13–31 October 2018

== Sources ==
- Akbaş, Merve (6 January 2019). "Mercan kırmızısı için 10 yıl emek verdim". Yeni Şafak.
- Baysan, Münire (11 October 2021). "Yaşayan İnsan Hazineleri Bağlamında Çini Sanatçısı Naciye Nur Avlupınar ve Sanatsal Faaliyetleri". Folklor/Edebiyat (Research article). 27 (106): 199–210. doi:10.22559/folklor.1719. S2CID 236737758.
- Çamaş, M.Talha (November 2011). "Türk motiflerine adanmış bir ömür, Nezihe Bilgütay Derler" (PDF). Darüşşafaka Rezidans. Vol. 3, no. 6. Maslak-Sarıyer/İstanbul: Darüşşafaka Society. pp. 24–27.
- Marmara, Tuba (May 2019). "2.3". YILDIZ PORSELEN VEJVUT SERİSİ İLE WEDGWOOD JASPER SERİSİ ÜRÜNLERİNİN KARŞILAŞTIRILMASI (Masters Thesis) (Report). Sakarya University. p. 66.
- "Our Residence Donors". darussafaka.org. Darüşşafaka Society.
- Serin, Muhittin (2012). "2. Sanat" (PDF). İslâm Ansiklopedisi. Vol. 41. Türkiye Diyanet Vakfı. pp. 578–581.
- Turan, Sitare; Dönmez, Nuray (2018). DÜN KÂŞÎ-EVÂNÎ, BUGÜN ÇİNİ SERGİSİ (PDF). Pendik Municipality. ISBN 978-605-2138-46-5.
- Turan, Sitare (April 2021a). "Nezihe Bilgütay Derler Hakkında". sanal-sergi.msgsu.edu.tr. Mimar Sinan Güzel Sanatlar Üniversitesi.
- Turan, Sitare (April 2021b). "Nezihe Bilgütay Derler Sergisi". sanal-sergi.msgsu.edu.tr. Mimar Sinan Güzel Sanatlar Üniversitesi.
