= Emel Gazimihal =

Turkish radio presenter (1912–1998)

- Born: Emel Öget; 1912
- Died: 1998 (aged 85–86); Istanbul, Turkey
- Resting place: Zincirlikuyu Cemetery, Istanbul
- Occupation: Radio presenter
- Known for: First Turkish female speaker
- Spouse: Tahsin Gazimihal

Emel Öget Gazimihal (1912–1998) was the first female radio presenter in Turkey.

== Biography ==
Emel Öget was born in 1912. Her father's name was Fevzi Öget. She married Tahsin Gazimihal.

In 1937, she was serving for the Turkish PTT in Istanbul. In the 1930s, Turkish Radio and Television Corporation (TRT) was not yet established, and the radio broadcasting was under the responsibility of the Turkish PTT. After an audition, she was recruited as the news speaker of Ankara Radio. She went to Ankara and immediately began working without any preliminary training. She recalls that in the early days of the radio, there was no standard acoustic treatment in the studio and the walls were covered by carpets.

On 1 October 1937, she was sent by the government to London, England to take training at the BBC (British Broadcasting Corporation) for six months. She returned to Turkey to continue as the only permanent female speaker. She served in Ankara Radio as a news speaker, and during World War II the Turkish people learned the course of the war by her voice. In 1951, she returned to Istanbul, and served about ten years in Istanbul Radio. She retired in 1962.

Emel Gazimihal died in 1998, and was buried at Zincirlikuyu Cemetery.
