= Mesrur İzzet Bey =

Ahmet Mesrur Durum (6 May 1873 – 18 December 1952), was a Turkish sculptor, painter, and designer of money, stamps and medallions.

He is one of the first Turkish sculptors. He is the artist who designed Turkey's first coins, many stamps and the design of the historically very important İstiklal Madalyası.

== Life ==
He was born in 1873 to his father who was a vilayet muhasebecisi, in Bosna where his father was stationed. Ahmet İzzet Ebu Şeneb Bey, his mother was Nafia Hanım'dır. The artist who at birth was named Ahmet Mesrur, with the coming of the surname law took the surname Durum and before then was known as Mesrur İzzet.

After the Emirgan Rüştüyesi he was educated in 1886 as the Tıbbiye İdadisi followed by the Tıbbiye Mülkiyesi.

However, after some time he left and joined the sculpture department of the Sanayi Nefise Mektebi where he was one of the first students of that department.

The sculptures he made in 1894 for his graduation examination were broken in the Istanbul Earthquake and his exam had to be repeated and then he finished the school in first place.

Upon this achievement he won the right to be educated in Paris funded by the state but this did not culminate sue to the death of his mother.

At the Yıldız Çini Fabrikası (Porselen Fabrika-i Hümayun) established in 1892 he started working as a model assistant. And at the same time continued his art and joined the 1902 exhibition at the Pera Passage Oriental II. İstanbul Salonu. He was among the founders of the Osmanlı Ressamlar Cemiyeti.

At the Yıldız Çini which had been closed for some time after the Abdülhamid, he started working again in 1911, and became the general director in 1914. While he was the director he established a çini school in the factory. The artist, who was modelling at the Darphane, after World War 1 had to leave his position at the Yıldız Çini Factory. At a shop in the Grand Bazaar he worked on antique sales and porcelain repairs. Ha made models and drawings of stamps, money and medallions.

In 1921 he married Ayşe Raciha Hanım, and this marriage brought the three children Mustafa Metin (1922), Saliha Sema (1925) and Saliha Semra (1927) into the world.

The artist worked for the republic for its first years and made the designs of the first coins, many stamps and medallions for the young republic. To be awarded the İstiklal medallion in 1923 he won the competition held by the İstanbul Darphane Directorate. Among his other works are: the100 para, 5 and 10 kuruş that came into circulation in 1924, 25 kuruş, which was introduced in 1925 and called "buffalo eye", Bursa Sergisi Madalyası, Belediye Madalyası, Abide-i Hürriyet Madalyası, İzmir Dokuz Eylül Sergisi Madalyası, İstanbul 1930 yılı ikinci yerli mallar sergisi madalyası, Bursa 10 July 1933 Yerli Mallar Sergisi Madalyası and the Ulusal Ekonomi Artırma Kurumu Madalyası.

When Surname Law appeared İzzet Bey took the name “Durum”. Among İzzet Beys works are sculptures, paintings, and porcelain vases. Part of his life was spent doing antique shop activities in the Grand Bazaar. A knowledgeable antique dealer and collector, Izzet Bey was a master at restoring ancient artifacts.

He died on December 18, 1952, and his tombstone reads "Sculptor of the İstiklal Madalyası".
