= Muhittin Serin =

Muhittin Serin (born 1945) is a Turkish hattat (islamic calligrapher) and professor.

== Early life ==
Muhittin Serin was born on 3 August 1945 in the Dimorta-Üzümören District of Tokat.

== Education ==
He graduated from the Islam Institute in 1970. He earned his doctorate from the Marmara University in 1983 in the field of Turkish-Islamic Arts.

== Career ==
In 1983 he became an assistant professor at the Marmara University and associate professor in 1992. Then he served as a professor from 1998 till the beginning of 2012. Since October of 2012 he has been working at the 29 Mayıs University.

Between 1983 and 2016 he wrote 50 articles for the İslâm Ansiklopedisi. He wrote on for museum exhibitions on the topic of Islamic calligraphy including at the Indiana University Fine Arts Museum, and presented a paper for a calligraphy festival organised by the Iran Ministry of Culture and Contemporary Arts Museum.

Professionally he is known as a calligrapher and a professor.

Books and publications in Turkish Language

• Hat Sanatımız (İstanbul 1982). “The art of islamic calligraphy”

• Hat Sanatı ve Meşhur Hattatlar (İstanbul 1999, 2003, 2008, 2010), “The art of islamic calligraphy and famous calligraphers”

• Hat Sanatı Târihi / Ekoller ve takipçileri 2 volumes (İstanbul 2019). “ The history of the art of islamic calligraphy”

• Calligrapher Aziz Efendi (İstanbul 1988, 1999);

• Calligrapher Şeyh Hamdullah (İstanbul 1992, 2007);

• Calligrapher Kemal Batanay (İstanbul 2006);

• Calligrapher Sâmi Efendi: Celî Ta‘lîk, Târih Manzûmesi (İstanbul 2014);

• Calligrapher Ahmed Şemseddin Karahisarî: Mushaf-ı Şerîf’i (İstanbul 2015);

• Kıbletü’l-Küttâb Şeyh Hamdullah: Mushaf-ı Şerîf (İstanbul 2016);

• Calligrapher Şekerzâde Seyyid Mehmed Efendi: Mushaf-ı Şerîf ( İstanbul 2018);

• Calligrapher Şevki Efendi Sülüs: Nesih Meşk Murakkaı (İstanbul 1996, 2018)

• Calligrapher Kazasker Mustafa İzzet Efendi: Sülüs Nesih Meşk Murakkaı (İstanbul 1996, 2020);

• Calligrapher Hulûsî Efendi :Ta’lîk Meşk Murakkaı (İstanbul 1999, 2021);

• Calligrapher Halim Efendi : Dîvânî, Celî Dîvânî, Rik’a Meşk Murakkaı (İstanbul 2000, 2014), Meşk Mecmuası (İstanbul 2017, 2019).
