= Yusuf İzzet Birand =

Turkish politician

Senate of the Republic
- In office 15 October 1961 – 12 February 1968

Personal details
- Born: 1902 Karaman, Ottoman Empire
- Died: 12 February 1968 (aged 65–66) Ankara, Turkey
- Party: Justice Party (AP)
- Other political affiliations: Republican People's Party (CHP)
- Education: Medicine
- Alma mater: Istanbul University, Military Medicine School
- Occupation: Politician, senator
- Profession: Physician, academic
- Known for: Rector of Ankara University

Yusuf İzzet Birand (1902 – 12 February 1968) was a Turkish military physician, academic and politician as a senator. He served as the rector of Ankara University.

== Early life ==
Yusuf İzzet was born in Karaman in 1902. After completing his primary and secondary education, he entered Istanbul University as a military student. After graduating from the School of Medicine in Istanbul University, he completed his internship in the Gülhane Military Medicine School and on 11 August 1924, he graduated as a military physician in the rank of a lieutenant.

== Physician career ==
In the following years, he was promoted to the ranks First lieutenant, Captain (1927), Major (1936) and Lieutenant colonel (1941). In 1941, he was assigned by the government to the School of Medicine at Ankara University. On January 19, 1946, he resigned from the military service, and was appointed professor at the Orthopedic Clinic the next day. During his academic service, he was elected the 6th rector of the university. On 23 September 1957, he resigned to enter politics. However, he became unsuccessful in the 1957 general election held on 27 October, and returned to his academic profession. He was appointed professor at the Orthopedic Clinic of Ege University on 30 January 1958. Between 1 March 1958 and 28 December 1959, Birand served as the Dean of the Faculty of Medicine. He resigned from his academic post on 28 April 1961 to run a seat for the newly established senate.

== Politics ==
In the 1961 senate elections, he was elected into the Senate of the Republic from the Justice Party (AP) of İzmir Province. He was re-elected in the 1964 senate elections on 7 June. However, he left his political party on 23 June 1964, and joined the Republican People's Party (CHP) keeping his seat after the 1966 elections until his death on 12 February 1968.
