= Nur Serter =

Turkish politician

Prof. Dr. Fatma Nur Serter

Vice rector
- In office 1998–2004

Deputy of Istanbul
- In office 2007–2015

Personal details
- Born: Fatma Nur Aytekin; 10 November 1948 (age 77) Istanbul, Turkey
- Party: Republican People's Party (CHP)
- Children: 1
- Education: Istanbul University; London School of Economics
- Occupation: Politician, academic, civil servant, writer

Fatma Nur Serter (born 10 November 1948) is a female Turkish academic and politician. She is advocates for the ban on hijab.

== Life ==
Fatma Nur Aytekin was born to Mehmet Emin and Fahrinüssa in Istanbul, Turkey on 10 November 1948. She finished the Üsküdar American Academy for Girls, and graduated from the School of Economics of Istanbul University in 1970. She is married and mother of one.

== Academic career ==
She joined the academic faculty of her school. In 1974, she obtained her PhD degree. She also studied in the London School of Economics. In 1982, she became an associate professor, and in 1988 full professor. Between 1998-2004, she was the Vice rector of Istanbul University.

== Political career ==
She joined the Republican People's Party (CHP). In the elections held on 22 July 2007 and 12 June 2011, she was elected as a deputy from Istanbul Province in the 23rd and the 24th Parliament of Turkey. In this period, she was the member of Inter-Parliamentary Union. In 2004, following the resignation of Emine Ülker Tarhan, another woman politician from CHP, she was also expected to resign. However, she made a statement that she will stay in CHP.

== Books ==
According to her Kitapyurdu page, the books written by Serter are the following:

- Dinde Siyasal Islamın Tekeli ("The Monopoly of the Political Islam in the Religion")
- Giydirilmiş İnsan Kimliği ("Embedded Human Personality")
- 21. Yüzyıla Doğru İnsan Merkezli Eğitim ("Human Based Education Towards 21st Century)
- 21 Yüzyılda İnsan Merkezli Eğitim ("Human Based Education in the 21st Century")
- Işığı Kim Söndürdü? ("Who Turned the Light Off?")
