= Şahap Sıtkı =

Turkish writer and translator (1915–1991)

Şahap Sıtkı İlter
- Born: April 2, 1915; Niğde, Ottoman Empire
- Died: September 3, 1991 (aged 76); Istanbul, Turkey
- Education: Ankara University, Law School
- Occupation: Writer
- Spouse: Ümit Hanım
- Children: 2
- Writing career
- Pen name: Şahap Sıtkı
- Language: Turkish
- Genres: Short story, novel
- Notable awards: "Short Story Prize" by Turkish Language Association

Şahap Sıtkı İlter (2 April 1915, in Niğde – 3 September 1991, in Istanbul), pen name Şahap Sıtkı, was a Turkish writer of novels, short stories and translator. He is better known for his short story books including: Acı, Çırılçıplak, and Bulut Gelir Pare Pare.

Sıtkı graduated from Antalya High School in 1936 and the Ankara University, Law School in 1941. After high school, he started working also while attending university and continued working until he retired in 1951.

== Published works ==
=== Short stories ===
- Cirilciplak (1957)
- Bulut Gelir Pare Pare (1958)
- Gulen Ayva Ağlayan Nar (1959)
- Şubat Gecesi (1964)
- Acı (1970)

=== Novels ===
- Gün Gormeyen Sokak (1958)
- Toprak (1962)
- Gökkuşağı (1965)
- Horoz Değirmeni (1967)
- Kimin İçin (1967)
