= Tahsin Aykutalp =

Turkish miniature artist

Tahsik Aykutalp working on a piece of calligraphy pre-2013.

Tahsin Aykutalp (1926 - 16 December 2013) was a Turkish miniature artist and teacher of tezhip.

He is recorded as saying "There is a miniature technique in all my cells".

== Early life ==
Dündar Tahsin Aykutalp was born in Istanbul in 1926 to his father Hayri Bey and mother Mevhibe Hanım, who was from the Kayi Tribe. His grandfather was Nakkaş Mevlüt Ağa. He gets his name Dündar from one of the generals of Fatih Sultan Mehmed who was named Dündar Bey. His early childhood was spent in the Silivrikapı district of Fatih where he also completed his primary education at a primary school named Yirmidördüncü İlkokulu. He attended middleschool at Mevlanakapı Ortaokulu. At this school his art teacher Sa'im Bey noticed Aykutalps talents in drawing and upon Sa'im Beys suggestion Aykutalp does the entry exam for the State Fine Arts Academy. Of the 400 participants of this exam he achieves the first place and is accepted to the Fina Arts Academy in 1946. Although being technically two months too old, upon the encouragement of some of the teachers he enters the Traditional Turkish Arts department. At the academy he is educated inder Cevat Dereli, Mustafa Halim Özyazıcı, Necmeddin Okyay, Feyzullah Dayıgil, İsmail Yümnî and Beykozlu Hüseyin Hoca. He graduated in 1951.

After his graduation he commences his mandatory military service. He serves 6 months in Ankara and 6 more months in Siirt as an officer. He marries Saadet Hanım in 1956 and produces one female and one male offspring with her. The decide to name their son, the male offspring, İsmet; their daughter, the female offspring is named Hayri.

== Career ==
Aykutalp starts his career working for the Istanbul Municipality for six and a half years. In 1960 he is invited by the Iraqi Government to teach at an institute affiliated with Baghdad University. He teaches there for another six and a half years, teaching tezhip, çini and carpet lessons, until the 1967 Arab-Israeli war. Upon his return to Turkey he teaches for some time at the Fatih Boys College and Ahmet Rasim Middleschool.

For the 1975-76 academic year he is appointed as a tezhip teacher at the Mimar Sinan Academy of Fine Arts, Traditional Turkish Arts Department. Here he becomes one of the founders of the Traditional Turkish Handicrafts Department along with teachers such as Neşe Aybey, Nezihe Bilgetay and İslam Seçen. He teaches in his field, tezhip, until 1993 the year which he retires. After that he continued to teach for some time as a part-timer.

In 1999 he got a severe sickness and stopped working as a teacher at the university.

== Legacy ==
He died 16 December 2013 and his body was lifted in the funerary procession from the Fatih Mosque, Istanbul and buried in İstanbul-Eyüp at the Eyüp Sultan Graveyard.
