= Sabire Aydemir =

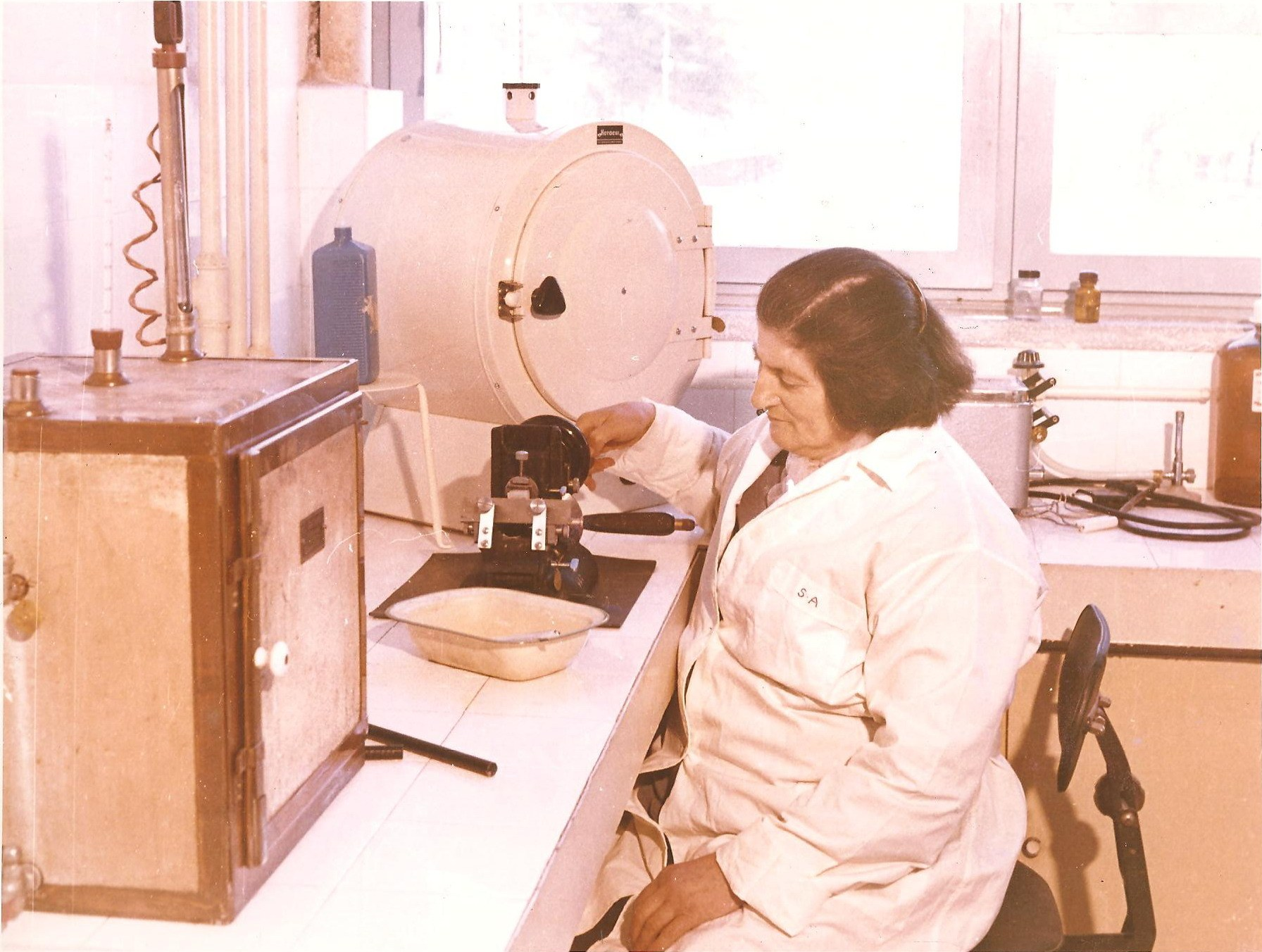
- Sabire Aydemir in her lab in Samsun
- Born: 1 February 1910; İnebolu, Ottoman Empire
- Died: 4 July 1991 (aged 81); Ankara, Turkey
- Education: Ankara University
- Occupation: Veterinary surgeon
- Known for: One of the first Turkish female veterinary surgeons

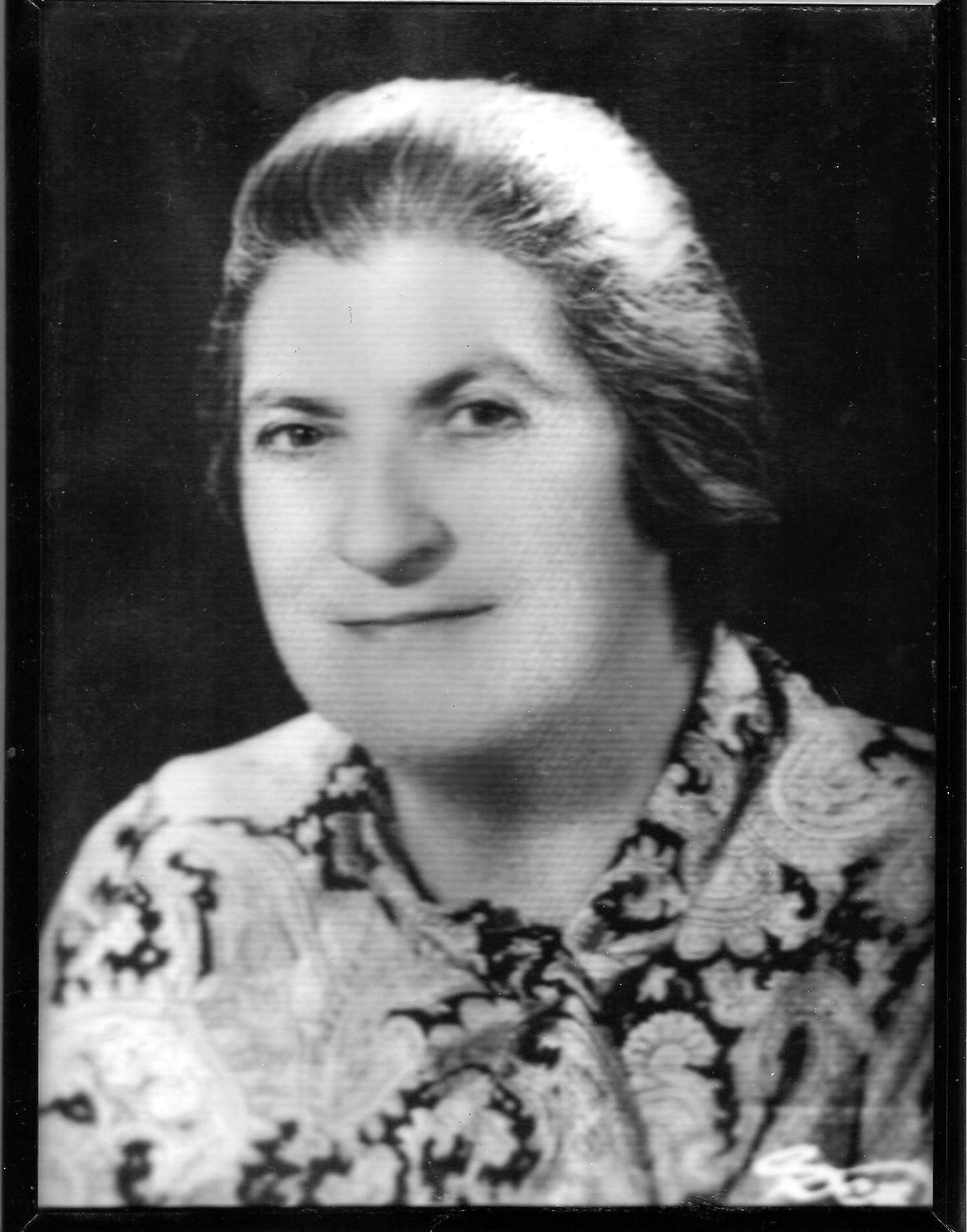
Sabire Aydemir in 1970s

Sabire Aydemir (1 February 1910 – 4 July 1991) was one of the first female Turkish veterinary surgeons. (Note: Merver Ansel who graduated from the Veterinary Medicine at Ankara University in 1935 is now recognized as the first female Turkish veterinary physcician.)

== Life ==
She was born in the İnebolu district of Kastamonu Province, Ottoman Empire in 1910. She completed primary school in her hometown and graduated high school at Erenköy Girls High School in Istanbul in 1933. She was married and mother of two, a son and a daughter. She died in 1991.

== Career ==
Her graduation from the high school coincides with the first year female students were admitted to the School of Veterinary Medicine at Ankara University. She completed her education in Veterinary medicine in 1937 as one of the ten female students. She served in the Refik Saydam Public Hygiene Institute for five years on bacteriology and earned the title of bacteriology expert.

Later she served in Pendik Bacterioogy institute in İstanbul and Etlik Veterinary Control and Research Institute in Ankara. Next, she volunteered to serve in another city, and she was appointed chief of the Rabies Laboratory in the Veterinary Control and Research Institute in Samsun.

== Legacy ==
On 1 December 1984, which was the 50th anniversary of full suffrage for Turkish women, she was invited to the Turkish parliament for receiving a plaque for being the first woman in a profession. In 2016, long after her death, she was awarded an honorary prize by the Turkish veterinarians Association
