= Nijat Sirel =

Turkish sculptor

Ali Nijat Sirel
- Born: 1897; Amasya, Ottoman Empire
- Died: 1959 (aged 61–62); Istanbul, Turkey
- Education: Sculpture
- Alma mater: Munich Fine Arts Academy, Sanayi-i Nefise Mektebi.
- Known for: sculpture

Ali Nijat Sirel (1897–1959) was a Turkish sculptor. The Bursa Atatürk Monument that he made in 1931 together with Mahir Tomruk is considered one of his best works. He is one of the first sculptors to take over monument sculpture in Turkey from foreigners. He is an important figure for Turkish sculpture as he and Mahir Tomruk are among the teachers to first educate the Republic-era Turkish sculptors.

== Biography ==
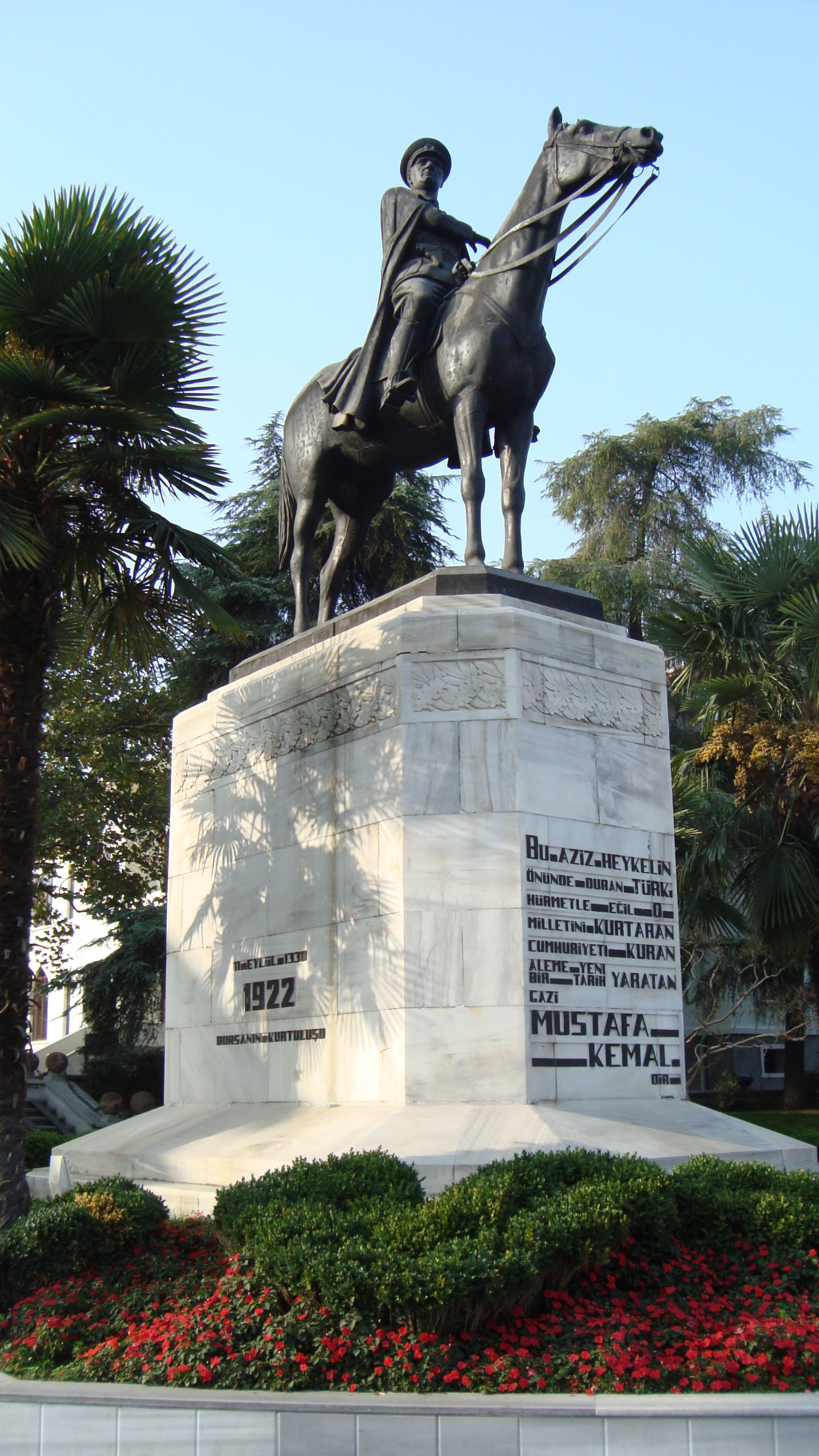
Bursa Atatürk Monument

Sirel was born in 1897 in Amasya. In 1915, he was sent to Germany on a state scholarship to study sculpture. He was educated at the Munich Fine Arts Academy, after which he returned home.

In 1922, he started to work in İzmir High School as an art teacher. In 1927, he was appointed as a sculpture teacher at the Fine Arts Academy Istanbul and gave lessons alongside Rudolf Belling. In 1952, Sirel became the head of the academy. He died in Istanbul in 1959.

He sculpted many monuments starting with the Bursa Atatürk Monument that he created with Mahir Tomruk in 1931. Following, he made the Çanakkale Atatürk Monument (1933), Kocaeli Ataturk Monument, Bolu Ataturk Monument, and together with Hakkı Atamulu the Atatürk and İnönü monuments in Malatya.
