= Leman Altınçekiç =

First female jet pilot of NATO and the Turkish Air Force

- Leman Altınçekiç in the 1950s
- Born: Leman Bozkurt; 1932; Sarıkamış, Turkey
- Died: 4 May 2001 (aged 68–69) İzmir, Turkey
- Allegiance: Turkey
- Branch: Turkish Air Force
- Rank: Colonel
- Known for: First female jet pilot in NATO

Leman Bozkurt Altınçekiç (1932 – 4 May 2001) was a Turkish pilot. She was the first female accredited jet pilot in the Turkish Air Force and NATO.

== Early years ==
Leman Bozkurt was born in 1932 in Sarıkamış, Kars Province to a Karapapak family. After graduating from an all-girls high school in Istanbul, she applied to the İnönü Training Center of the Turkish Aeronautical Association in the İnönü district of Eskişehir Province to be trained as a glider pilot.

== Military service ==
When the Turkish Air Force decided to enroll women in 1954, she applied to enlist in the air force. She was the very first female student in the military school in İzmir. She was trained on propeller aircraft between 1955 and 1957. In an interview she says that in the early days, the school had no boarding facility for the female students and she had to stay as a guest in the house of an officer's family. On 30 August 1957, she graduated as a military pilot. Although, five other female students were also accepted to the school after her, she was the only female student to join the aviation unit in the Eskişehir military base. She was trained in Eskişehir as a jet pilot and earned the rank of second lieutenant on 22 November 1958. Up to 1967 she flew in a Republic F-84 Thunderjet and a Lockheed T-33. In her later years she served in staff duty. She retired as a senior air colonel.

== Private life ==
In 1959, Leman Bozkurt married Tahir Altınçekiç, a colleague in Eskişehir. She died on 4 May 2001 in İzmir. She was laid to rest in Karabağlar Cemetery.

== Legacy ==
On 1 December 1984, which is the 50th anniversary of full suffrage for Turkish women, she was invited to the Turkish parliament and received a plaque for being the first woman in the profession.
