= Rafet Angın =

First female high school teacher of Turkey

Fatma Rafet Angın (18 March 1915 – 30 January 2010) was the first female high school teacher of Turkey. She was awarded Turkey's Teacher of the Year title in 1981.

== Biography ==
She was born on 18 March 1915. She was born to her mother Halime in Gelibolu, during the Naval operations in the Dardanelles Campaign. Her father Hafız Şerif, was one of the Turkish nationalists. She chose teaching as her profession. During Atatürk's visit to her school in 1928, she spoke to Atatürk saying, she intends to be a school teacher. Upon Atatürk's suggestion, she chose the History branch. In 1936, she graduated from Gazi Institute for Education in Ankara, current Gazi University, as a History teacher. After serving in various high schools, she was appointed as the school principal in Antakya high school. She also served in Balıkesir and Gaziantep high schools as school principal. She took part in the Village Institutes program.

In 1981, she was recognized with the "Teacher of the Year" award. The following year, although she officially retired, she continued teaching and also served as a consultant of the Ministry of National Education. In 2006, she was awarded honorary doctorate degree by Yıldız Technical University.

Rafet Angın later then died on 30 January 2010 in Istanbul.

== In popular culture ==
In the Turkish TV serial Hayat Bilgisi, Angın was characterized as the teacher of the hero.

== Legacy ==
There is a junior high school in Istanbul named after Fatma Refet Angın.
