= Ceyhun Atuf Kansu =

Turkish doctor, author and poet (1919-1978)

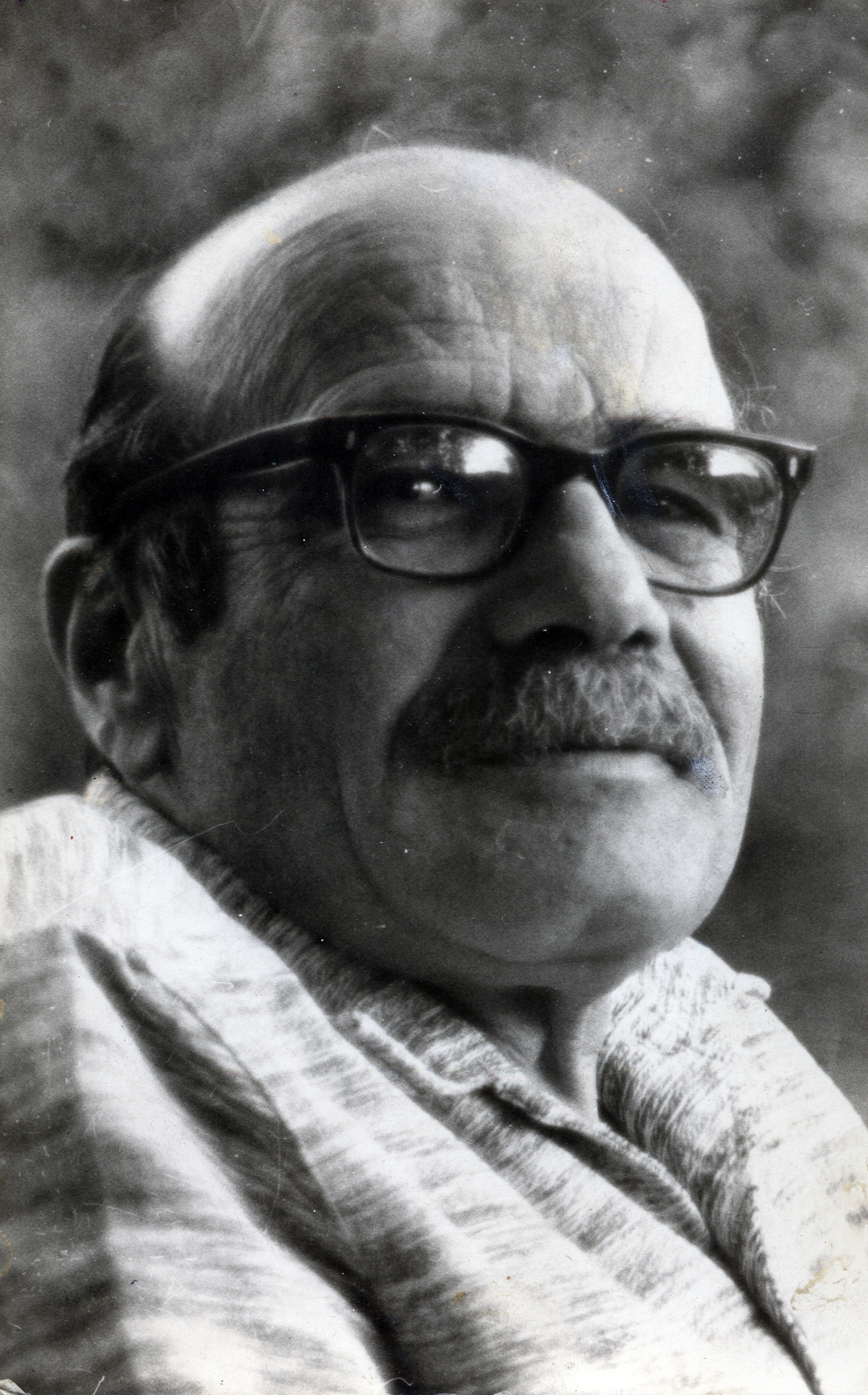
- Born: Ceyhun Atuf; December 7, 1919; Istanbul, Ottoman Empire
- Died: March 10, 1978 (aged 58); Ankara, Turkey
- Education: Istanbul University
- Occupations: Pediatrician, poet, author
- Years active: 1944-1978

Ceyhun Atuf Kansu (1919-1978) was a Turkish pediatrician, author and poet.

== Life ==
Ceyhun Atuf was born to Nafi and Müfdalein Istanbul, Ottoman Empire on 7 December 1919. After the death of his mother his father moved to Ankara, the capital of the nationalists. He graduated from the Gazi High School in Ankara in 1938, and the School of Medicine of Istanbul University in 1944. He served in the Numune Hospital in Ankara. During this time, he opened a private clinic for the children in a poor neighborhood of Ankara. Then for eleven years, he served as a pediatrician in the clinic of the Sugar Refinery of Turhal in Tokat Province. After 1959, he returned to Ankara to serve in the Clinics of the Sugar Refineries there. He died on 10 March 1978.

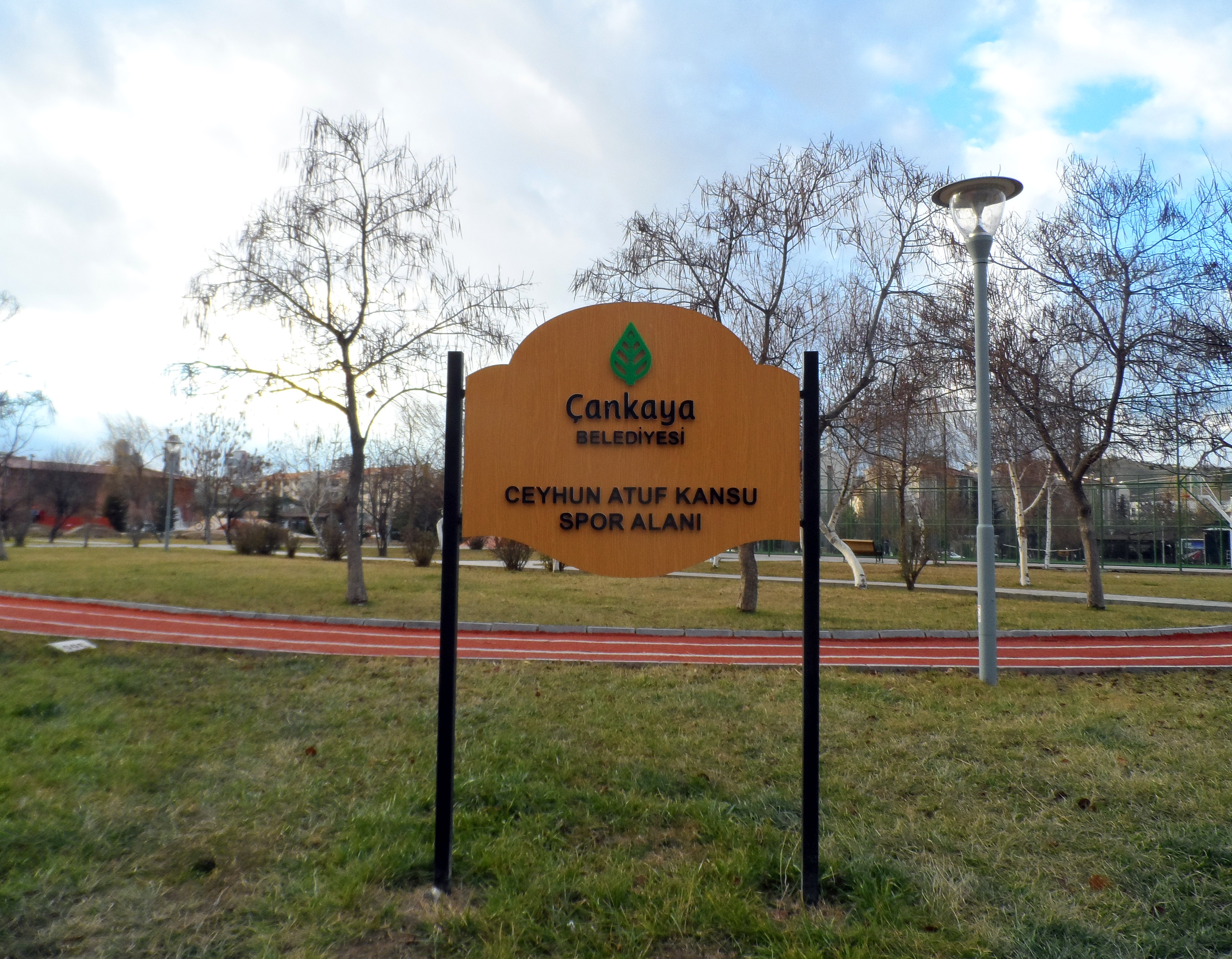
Ceyhun Atuf Kansu Play field in Ankara

== Literary career ==
Already during the early years of his career, he devoted himself to the children. Later, he also got interested in social issues and national independence. His books, some published after his death, are the following:

- 1966: Atatürkçü Olmak ("Being Kemalist")
- 1969: Atatürk ve Kurtuluş Savaşı ("Atatürk and the National War of Independence")
- 1970: Buğday, Kadın, Gül ve Gökyüzü ("Woman, Rose and the Sky")
- 1971: Balım Kız Dalım Oğul ("My Daughter the Honey, my Son the Branch")
- 1972: Halk Önderi Atatürk ("Leader Atatürk")
- 1972: Sevgi Elması ("The Apple of Love")
- 1973: Cumhuriyet Ağacı ("The Tree of the Republic")
- 1973: Cumhuriyet Bayrağı Altında ("Under the Flag of the Republic")
- 1991: Bir Kasabadan Resimler ("Photographs from a Town")
- 1991: Güneş Salkımı ("Bunch of Sun")
- 1994: Halk Albümü ("People’s Album")
- 1996: Söylevi Okurken ("While Reading the Speech")
- 2004: Kardeş Sofrası ("Brother’s Table")

He also wrote professional books:

- 1954: Turhal Dolaylarında Çocuk Bakımı("Childcare around Turhal")
- 1959: Anneler Soruyorlar ("Mothers ask")
- 1961: Kasabalar ve Köylerde Çocuk Bakımı ("Childcare in towns and villages")

== Legacy ==
The "Ceyhun Atuf Kansu Poetry Award Contest" is an annual prize established by the municipality of Çankaya after his death. There are a street, a park and a play field all in Ankara named after him.
