= Hamdi Apaydın =

Turkish politician (1862–1936)

Ahmet Hamdi Apaydın
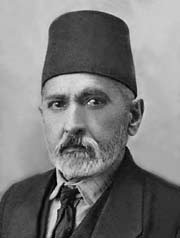
- Ahmet Hamdi Apaydın (from the parliament page)

MP of the first parliament of Turkey
- In office 23 April 1920 – 15 April 1923

Personal details
- Born: 1862 Erzurum, Ottoman Empire
- Died: 28 October 1936 (aged 73–74) Amasya, Turkey
- Citizenship: Turkish
- Party: Republican People's Party (CHP)
- Children: Nimet, Hasan, Reşat, Enver
- Occupation: Politician, civil servant

Ahmet Hamdi Apaydın (1862 – 28 October 1936) was a Turkish politician. His name during the Ottoman era was Miralayzade Ahmet Hamdi (Ahmet Hamdi, the son of the Colonel) But after the Surname Law in Turkey in 1934, he took the surname Apaydın and dropped the epithet Miralayzade.

== Life ==
He was born in Erzurum in 1862 during the Ottoman Empire era. His father Hasan was a colonel in the Ottoman army. He completed his primary education in Erzurum and secondary education in Sivas and Amasya. He began his professional life as a clerk in 1881. Next year he voluntarily attended the army. But he resigned from the army in 1894 while he was a lieutenant. In 1897, he returned to his former profession as the chief clerk in the royal farm's directorate. During the First World War he established an institution for the orphans of the war.

He was married and the father of a daughter and three sons. He died on 28 October 1936 in Amasya.

== Political life ==
After the First World War, he supported the Turkish National Movement during the Turkish War of Independence. He established the Association for Defence of National Rights (Turkish: Müdafaa-i hukuk Cemiyeti) in Amasya. When Mustafa Kemal (later Atatürk) visited Amasya to declare his famous circular on 12 June 1919, he was one of the welcomers. He was elected as the Amasya MP from the Republican People's Party (CHP, then known as Halk Fırkası) in the First Parliament of Turkey on 23 April 1920. In the parliament he was elected to the committee of Finance. After the war, he did not run for the next elections held in 1923 and returned to Amasya.
