= Ayşe Saffet Rıza Alpar =

Turkish chemist and academic

- Born: 17 April 1903
- Died: 1 February 1981 (aged 77); Ankara, Turkey
- Education: University of Hamburg
- Known for: President of Karadeniz Technical University
- Scientific career
- Fields: Chemist
- Workplaces: Istanbul, Trabzon

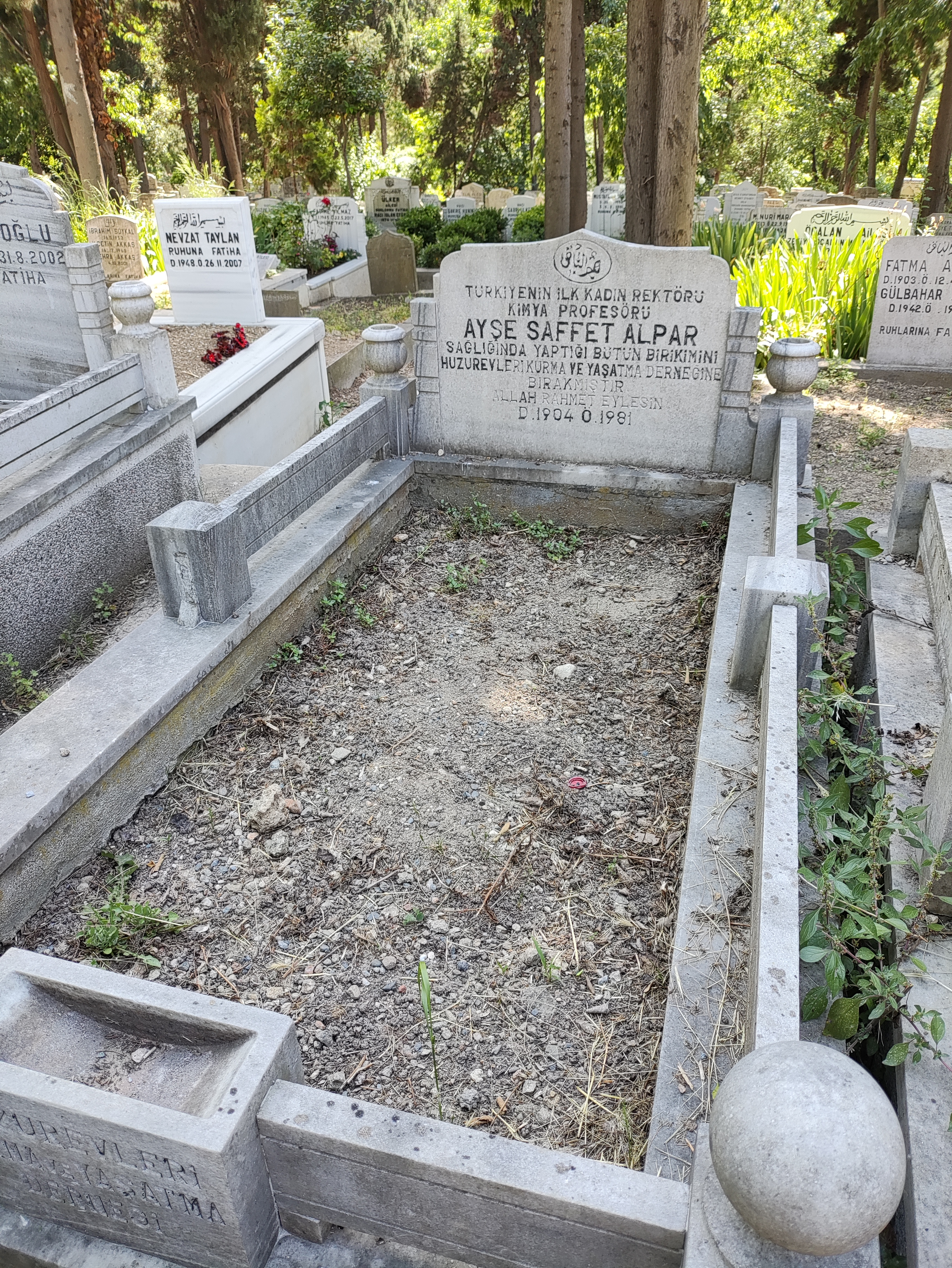
Ayşe Saffet Alpar's grave in Kozlu Cemetery.

Ayşe Saffet Rıza Alpar (17 April 1903 - 1 February 1981) was the first female university rector in Turkey. She is also the second female chemist of the country after Remziye Hisar.

Ayşe Saffet Rıza was born to Hasan Rıza Pasha on 17 April 1903. Her father was a general of the Ottoman Empire, the commander during the Siege of Scutari (1912–13) in the First Balkan War. Following the killing of her father in 1913, she was raised in the German Empire. She came to Turkey for studying in Kandilli High School for Girls. For university, she traveled once more to Germany to study chemistry in University of Hamburg. In 1932, she obtained her PhD. The next year, she began her academic career in Istanbul University. In 1941, she became associate professor, and in 1950 full professor. Later, she moved to Karadeniz Technical University. She served as a dean of the faculty of Basic Sciences. In 1972, she was elected rector of the university. She was the first female rector in Turkey. In 1974, she retired.

After her retirement, she joined the Nationalist Movement Party (MHP). She died on 1 February 1981.

== Legacy ==
Before her death, she donated a senior center in Istanbul to the Ministry of Family and Social Policy.

== Books ==
In addition to her translations, she authored following books:

- 1944: Su ve Teknolojisi ("Water and Its Technology")
- 1946: Kimyasal Teknoloji ("Chemical Technology")
- 1946: Sinai Kimya Analiz Metodları ("Methods of Industrial Chemical Analysis")
- 1951: Su ve Teknolojisi: İçme Suyu ("Water and Its Technology: Drinking Water")
- 1968: Organik Sınai Kimya ("Organic Industrial Chemistry")
