= Feriha Sanerk =

Turkish police chief

Police chief
- In office 1953–1974

Personal details
- Born: 1 July 1923 İzmir, Turkey
- Died: 19 November 2010 (aged 87) Antalya, Turkey
- Education: Faculty of Political Science, Ankara University

Şerife Feriha Sanerk (1 July 1923 – 19 November 2010) was the first female police chief in Turkey.

== Life ==
She was born in İzmir, Turkey on 1 July 1923. In 1945, she graduated from the Faculty of Political Sciences of Ankara University. In 1946 she succeeded in the entrance examination of the Ministry of Interior and was appointed as a vice commissar. In 1951, she received a certificate from the police in-service training center. After completing the training, she was appointed police chief. She served as the Director of Legal Affairs, Director of the Media Relations and the Director of Research Center. She also taught in the Police Training Center. She retired in 1974.

She was married to Adnan Sanerk and gave birth to two daughters. In later years, one of her daughters Nurdan Canca was also appointed police chief. She died on 19 November 2010 in Antalya, and was laid to rest in Uncalı Cemetery.

== Legacy ==
On 27 November 2008, she received an honor plaque from Women's Congress. In the Turkish documentary film Nisvan, she was depicted by Elif Tayhan.
