= Mahir Tomruk =

Turkish sculptor

Mehmet Mahir Tomruk
- Mehmet Mahir Tomruk
- Born: 1885
- Died: 1949 (aged 63–64)
- Education: Sanayi-i Nefise Mektebi
- Known for: sculpture

Mehmet Mahir Tomruk (1885–1949) was a Turkish sculptor who is one of lead figures in pre-Republic sculpture. He is one of the sculptors to be educated in the Sanayi-i Nefise in the time before the foundation of the Turkish Republic where ha later taught many famous sculptors. His busts are considered powerful works in the scope of fine art and his style is reminiscent of the effects of German Neo-classicism.

In 1916, he graduated from the Sanayi-i Nefise Mektebi where he was the student of İhsan Özsoy.

He worked in the Munich Fine Arts Academy in the atelier of Prof. Kurtz and Prof. Belecker. He stayed in (Germany) for 10 years until he returned home in 1924, and was appointed to a teaching position at the Sanayi-i Nefise.

From 1933 to 1948 he taught in his atelier.

In 1937, Nijat Sirel was one of Tomruks students at the Mimar Sinan Fine Arts University. Together with Sirel, Tomruk had created the Bursa Atatürk Monument in 1931.

He taught many well known sculptors including Ali Hadi Bara and Zühtü Müridoğlu.
