= Zerrin Güngör =

Zerrin Güngr

President of the Council of State
- Incumbent
- Assumed office 18 July 2013
- Preceded by: Hüseyin Karakullukçu

Deputy President of the Council of State
- In office 12 June 2012 – 18 July 2013
- Preceded by: Semra Kayır
- Succeeded by: Mehmet Solgun

Personal details
- Born: March 20, 1955 (age 71) Kırşehir, Turkey

Zerrin Güngör (born 1955, in Kırşehir) is the president of the Turkish Council of State (Turkish: Danıştay).

She was born on 20 March 1955 in Kırşehir. After finishing Kırşehir high school she moved to Ankara for higher education. After graduating from Academy of Economics and Finance in 1976, she served in tax courts of Bolu and Ankara. In 1999, she was appointed to the Turkish council of state. In 2008 she became the a member of the council board and in 2012 she was elected as the deputy president of the council. On 18 June 2013, the former president was retired and after many election cycles, Zerrin Güngör was able to receive 80 votes, higher than the minimum number of votes necessary to be elected.

She is married and the mother of two.

Zerrin Güngör is the third woman president in the history of the council. Two former woman presidents were Firuzan İkincioğulları and Sumru Çörtoğlu.

== See also ==
- Legal System in the Republic of Turkey

Legal offices
Preceded by Hüseyin Karakullukçu	President of the Council of State of Turkey; 2013-present	Succeeded by
