= Şadi Çalık =

Turkish sculptor

Mehmet Şadi Çalık Bey
- Born: 1917; Heraklion, Greece
- Died: 24 December 1979 (aged 61–62); İzmir, Turkey
- Resting place: Bornova Hacılar Kiri cemetery
- Known for: Sculpture
- Spouse: Müfide Cumalı

Şadi Çalık (1917 – 24 December 1979) was a Turkish sculptor. He is famous for his abstract sculpture.

Çalık was born in Heraklion, on the island of Crete, in 1917. In 1923, during the Population exchange between Greece and Turkey, he moved to İzmir with his family. Between 1932 and 1939, he worked in the atelier of the painting teacher Abidin Elderoğlu in İzmir on drawing. In 1939, he started in the Sculpture Department of the Fine Arts Academy of Istanbul. In 1940, he created the first piece that was ordered from him, "Atbaşları". With many busts, he created, he showed that he could do quality work quickly and with ease. At the Fine Arts Academy, he was a student of Rudolf Belling between 1940 and 1948.

From 1950 to 1951, he worked in Paris, France. He self funded his trip to Paris, where he learned much about sculpture, there he worked at the abstract sculpture Atelier at Rue Grand Chaumiere. He worked freelance until 1959, and then started teaching at the Fine Arts Academy. In 1971, he was appointed a professor there.

He won several national sculpture competitions.

== Style ==
In 1950, Çalık started to make abstract sculptures. He started with traditional classic sculpture and slowly moved more towards abstract sculpture with time.

== Personal life ==
He married Müfide Cumalı, the sister of Necati Cumalı, on 1 September 1951, and they moved to Istanbul together. In 1952, their daughter, Siren, was born. Later, they also had a son, Osman Çalık.

He was friends with the artists Cevat Şakir, Sabahattin Eyüboğlu, Azra Erhat, İlhan Koman and others.
