= Fulya Kantarcıoğlu =

Vice Undersecretary of the Ministry of Justice
- In office 27 February 1992 – 20 October 1994

Member of the Council of State
- In office 20 October 1994 – 19 December 1995

Member of the Constitutional Court
- In office 19 December 1995 – 17 February 2013

Personal details
- Born: February 17, 1948 (age 78) Ankara, Turkey

Fulya Kantarcıoğlu (born 17 February 1948) is a Turkish female jurist. She was a member of supreme courts.

== Early life and education ==
Fulya Kantarcıoğlu was born in Ankara, Turkey on 17 February 1948. After finishing her primary and high school education, she graduated from the School of Law of Ankara University in 1969. She is married and mother of two.

== Career ==
She started to serve at the Council of State (Turkish: Daniştay) of Turkey on 27 October 1970. On 7 March 1973, she was assigned as a reporter at the Constitutional Court of Turkey (Turkish: Anayasa Mahkemesi). On 27 February 1992, she was appointed the Vice Undersecretary of the Ministry of Justice. On 20 October 1994 she was elected to the Council of State as a member. On 19 December 1995, she was appointed by the President Süleyman Demirel to the membership of the Constitutional Court. She retired on 17 February 2013.
