= Şahamettin Kuzucular =

Turkish Poet, Author

Şahamettin Kuzucular (born 1961), is a Turkish, poet, author and editor-in-chief of the Edebiyat ve Sanat Akademisi (ESA) literally meaning "Literature and Art Academy". He is noted for his prose poetry.

== Education and personal life ==
Kuzucular was born in 1961 in the city of Sivas where he completed his primary and secondary education. Following this he was accepted into the Literature Faculty of the Ankara University and graduated from there in 1985. After some time working in commerce he went to do his Military service where he served in Bilecik and Izmir. During his military service he did a pedagogical exam which he passed, and this allowed him to start working in Kars after the end of his military service. In 1989 he married and completed a master's degree at Sivas Cumhuriyet University. He then started to teach at Hatay Dörtyol.

== Career ==
He is one of the major representatives of prose poetry in Turkey along with Mehmet Rauf, Edip Cansever, Enis Batur, İbrahim Şinasi, Yakup Kadri Karaosmanoğlu, Ahmet Oktay, Halit Ziya Uşaklıgil, Tevfik Fikret and Cenap Şahabettin.

He currently is a teacher at Hatay Dörtyol. He is also the president of the Edebiyat Sanat ve Sanatçılar Derneği (ESAS-DER) "Literature Art and Artists Society", and editor-in-chief of the Edebiyat ve Sanat Akademisi (ESA) literally meaning "Literature and Art Academy", the latter of which he founded in 2009. According the Kuzucular, ESA us the most serious source of information on Traditional Turkish Arts and Fine arts.

== Works ==
- Özleşim " Özleşmeyi Özleyen Öznelerin Eylemesi", – 2008
- Dörtyol Hatay Çukurova Tarihi ve Türkmenleri,- 2012
- İlk Kurşun – 2017
- Çukurova Gâvurdağı Tarihi ve Türkmenleri – 2018
- Alaçıktan Gökdelene – March 2018
- Eşref Bey İle Zühre Han – January 2018
- Ahi Baba Çıkmazları – November 2021
