= Galataport =

Port and mixed-use complex in Istanbul

Coordinates: 41.024833°N 28.981010°E

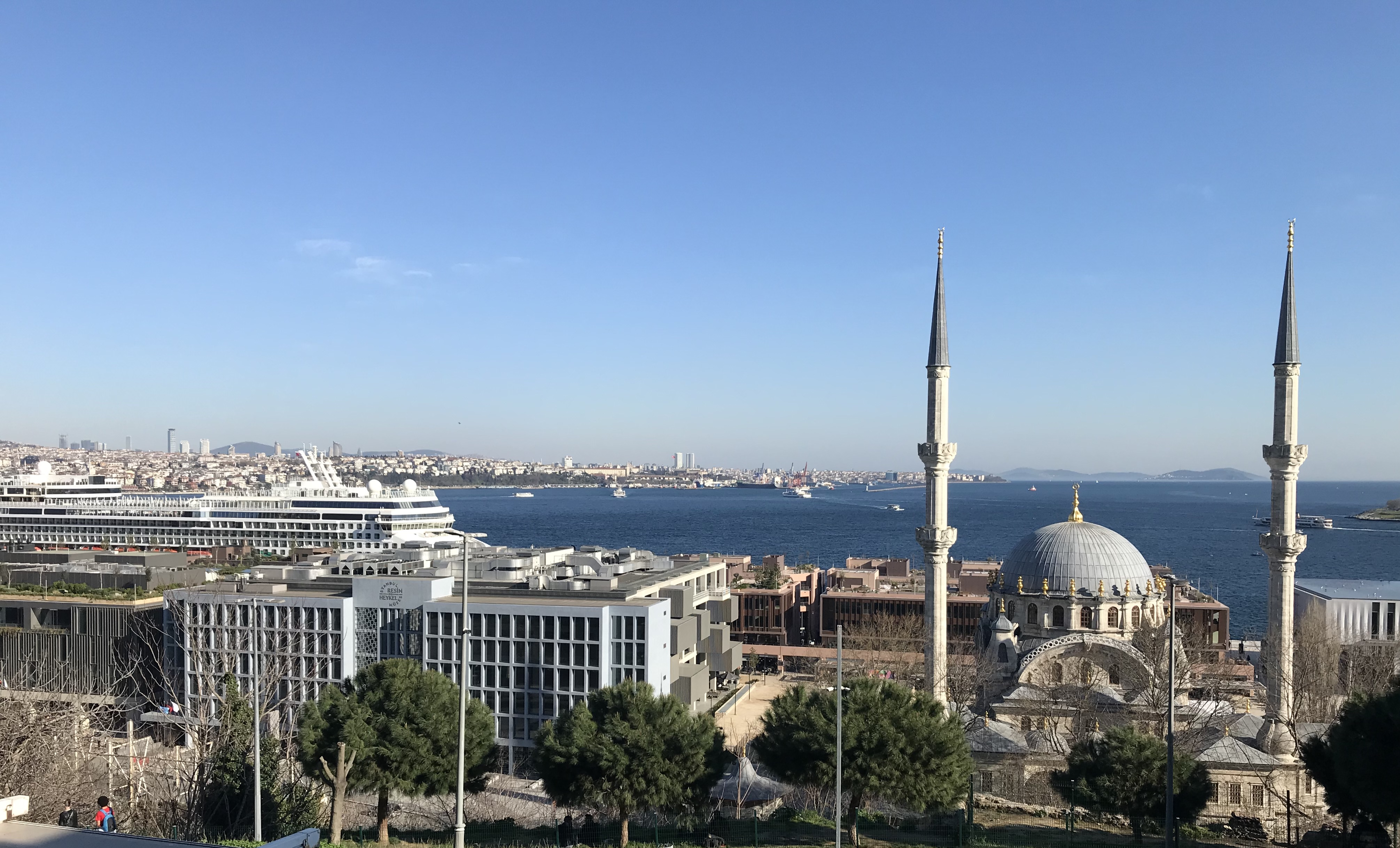
- Overview of Galataport from Cihangir, with the Istanbul Painting and Sculpture Museum on the left and Nusretiye Mosque on the right. The Asian side of Istanbul and the Princes' Islands are visible in the background.

Project
- Construction started: 2016
- Completed: 2022
- Construction cost: US$1.8 billion
- Status: Complete
- Developer: Doğuş Group; Bilgili Holding
- Architect: Renzo Piano; Emre Arolat; Dror + Gensler; TO Studio; BEA Architects; Autoban; Norm Architecture
- Operator: Istanbul Port Management and Investments Inc
- Website: galataport.com

Physical features
- Major buildings: Istanbul Modern Art Museum, Istanbul Museum of Painting and Sculpture, The Peninsula Istanbul, shops, restaurants
- Public spaces: Public square
- Transport: Cruise terminal

Location
- Interactive map of Galataport
- Country: Turkey
- City: Istanbul
- Neighbourhood: Karaköy
- Address: Kılıçali Paşa Mahallesi, Meclis-i Mebusan Caddesi, No: 8, İç Kapı No:102, 34433, Beyoğlu, İstanbul

Area
  - Total: 40 ha (99 acres)

Galataport is a 400,000-square-metre (4,300,000 sq ft) mixed-use development located along 1.2 km (0.75 mi) of shore in the Karaköy (formerly called Galata) neighbourhood of Istanbul, Turkey on the European shore of the Bosporus strait near its confluence with the Golden Horn right in the heart of the city. It includes the city's cruise ship terminal, around 250 shops and restaurants, a Peninsula hotel, the Istanbul Modern art museum, and other cultural and entertainment facilities; the complex also hosts festivals.

== History ==
=== Origins ===
Galataport lies just a little way northeast of the ferry terminal at Karaköy which was the city's original terminal for passenger ships. By the late 20th century that site was no longer suitable to accommodate the growing number of ever larger cruise ships wanting to drop anchor in the city so a new site was sought. The location selected had long been home to warehouses associated with the port but most of these had fallen out of use. By the end of the 20th century it was best known as being the location of the Istanbul Modern art gallery (housed in an old warehouse) and a string of nargile (water-pipe) cafes popular with young people.

=== Development of the Port ===
The project to develop Galataport was a joint venture between Turkey's Doğuş Group and Bilgili Holding, who, between them, invested over US$1.8 billion in the venture. The development now occupies 1,200 metres (3,900 ft) of shoreline, part of it on reclaimed land.

After delays caused in part by the COVID-19 pandemic, the terminal started to open in 2021, with the first ship docking there in October 2021. By 2022 the terminal was entirely open to ships.

== Components ==
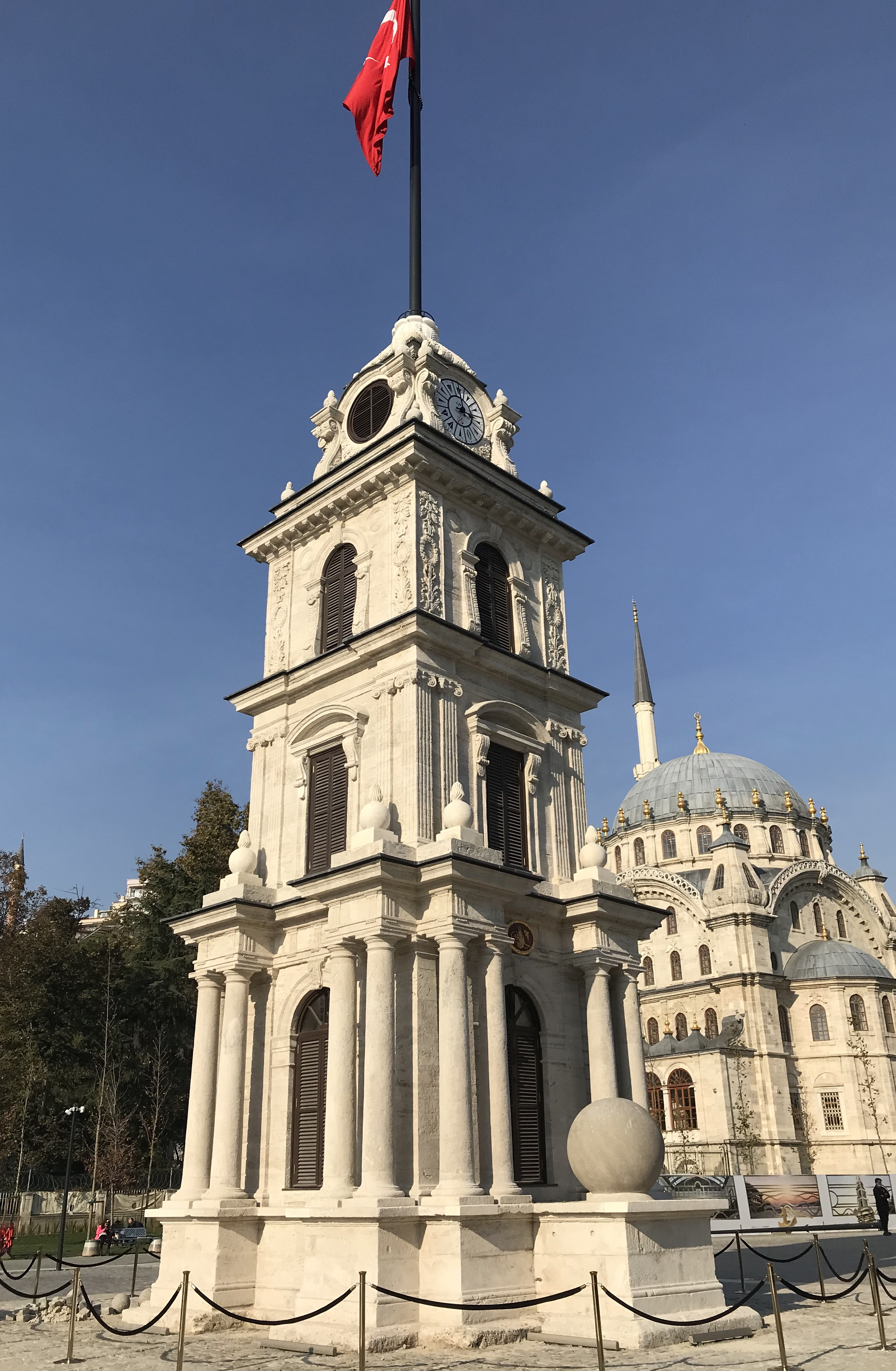
The restored Nusretiye Clock Tower on the public square and the Nusretiye Mosque behind it

=== Cruise terminal ===
The cruise terminal covers 29,000 sq metres of land and spreads along 1.2 kilometres of shore, with views across the water to the historic peninsula of Istanbul with Topkapı Palace and the Ayasofya Mosque at its heart. It has space for three large cruise ships to dock side by side behind specially designed screens that rise to ensure that no one can leave the ships without passing through the Customs and Immigration facilities but that are retracted when no ships are in port. Customs and Immigration facilities are located underground, with most of the overground space taken up by shops, restaurants and offices. Many international chains such as Starbucks and Burger King have opened branches here alongside Turkish chain stores such as Kahve Dünyası, D&R and Baylan.

=== Public square ===
Development of the port area includes the creation of a new square covering the site of an old military parade ground and centred on Istanbul's first free-standing clocktower. The water side of the square is occupied by the new Renzo Piano-designed home for the Istanbul Modern art gallery, scheduled to open in the autumn of 2022. The north side of the square is occupied by a newly constructed building for the Istanbul Painting and Sculpture Museum (Turkish: İstanbul Resim ve Heykel Müzesi), a collection of mainly 19th and early 20th-century Turkish works of art moved here from its old home beside the Dolmabahçe Palace and was opened in the autumn of 2022. The west side of the square is occupied by the Ottoman baroque Nusretiye (Victory) Mosque, dating back to the 1820s, and by the William James Smith-designed Tophane Pavilion (Turkish: Tophane Kasrı), dating back to 1852 and built to provide a base for the sultan while he was viewing his troops in the square. On the southern side of the square is the Mimar Sinan-designed 16th-century Kılıç Ali Paşa Mosque and the Tophane Fountain, erected in 1732.

The square is large enough to accommodate a stage for concerts and other organised activities.

=== Shopping and dining ===
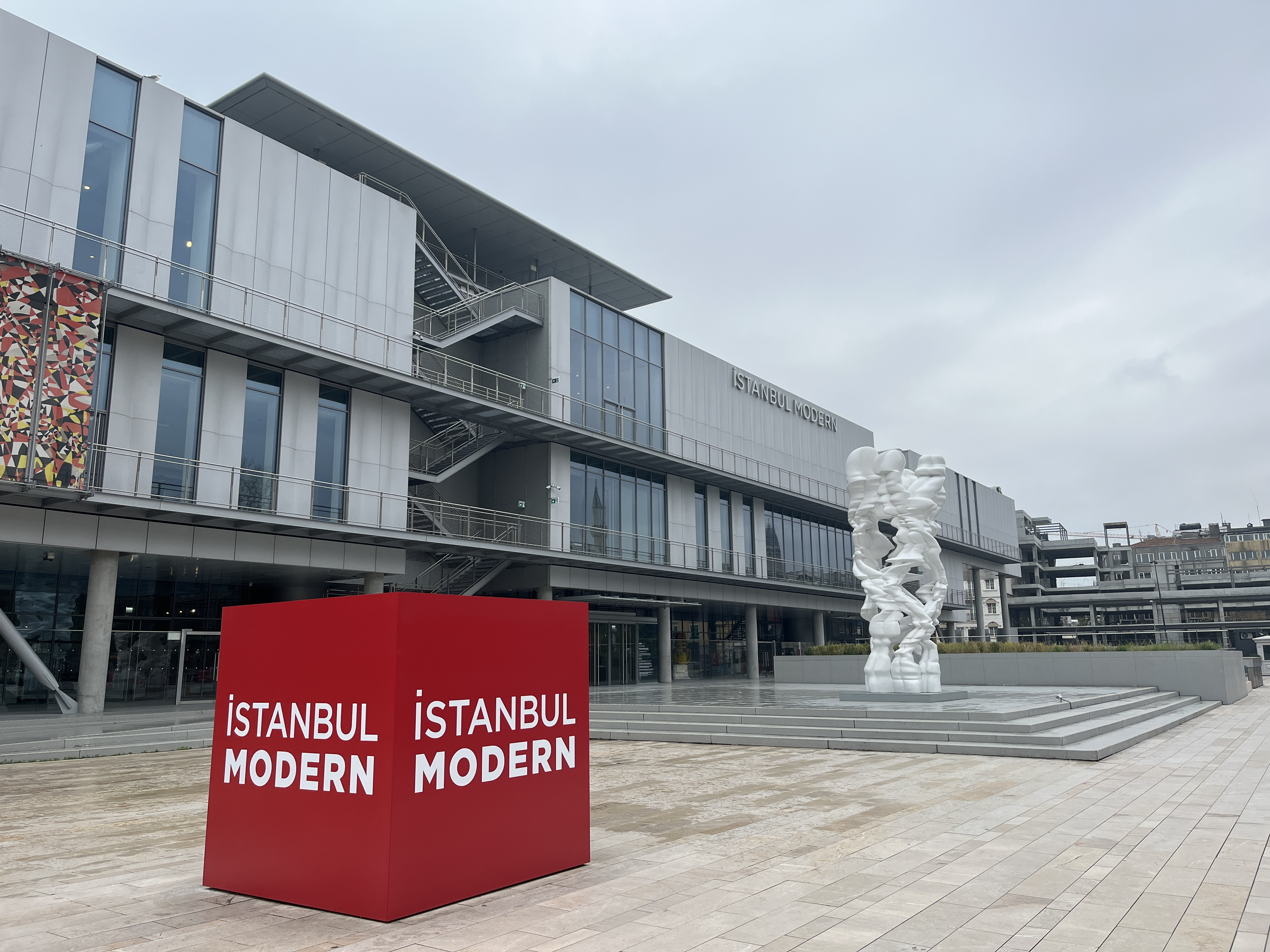
The Istanbul Modern Art Museum designed by Renzo Piano

The shore area connecting the main part of the cruise terminal to the Karaköy ferry terminal and the Galata Bridge has also been redeveloped as part of the Galataport project.

The shopping and dining complex consists of one large group of modern buildings (block at the northern end of Galataport, as well as the Paket Postanesi ("package post office"), designed by S. Saboureaux and opened in 1911, has been restored to house shops and exhibition space. All in all, these areas are 52,000 sqm in area.

There are 250 shops and restaurants and other food service outlets in total.

=== Other ===
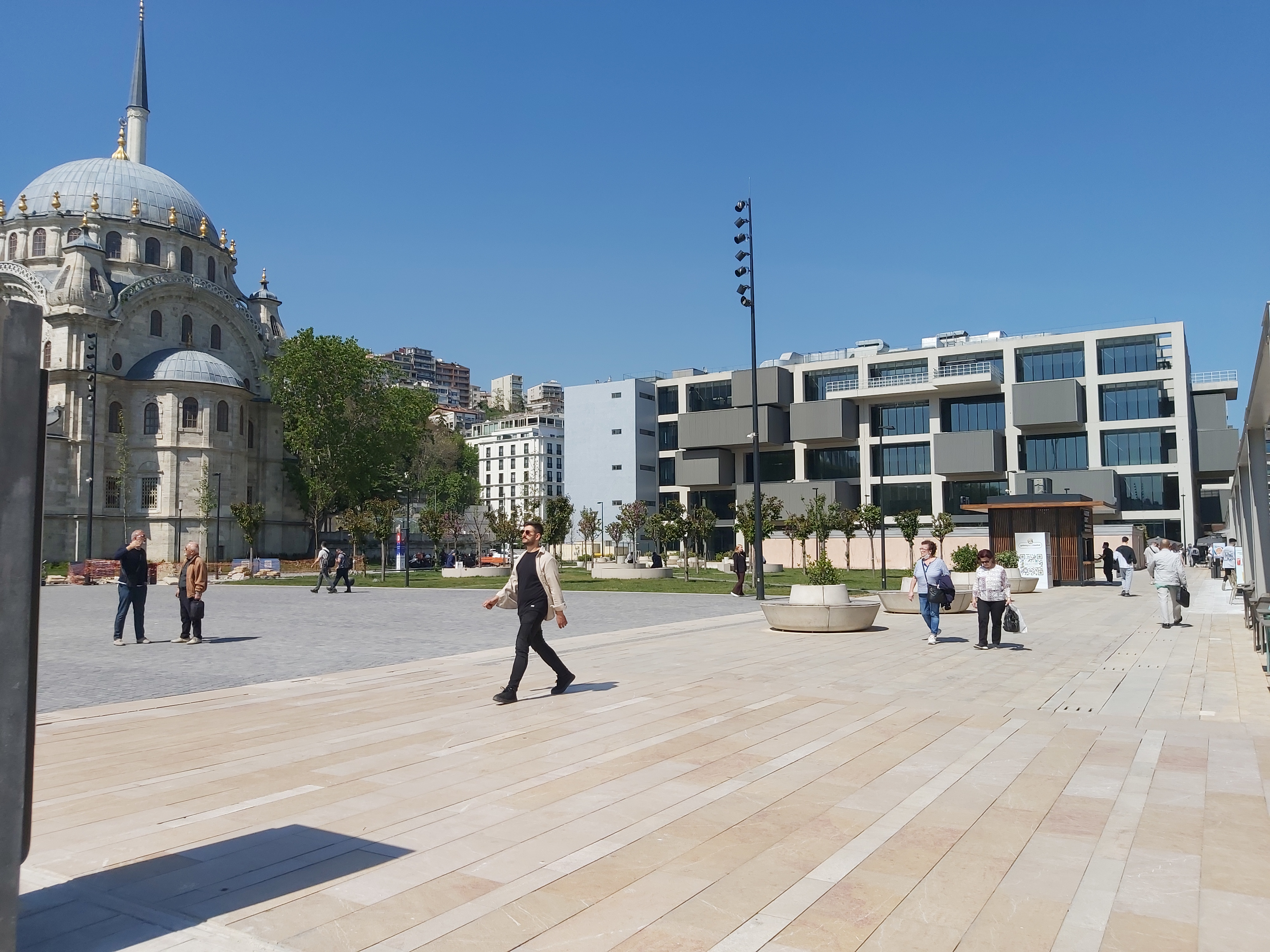
The Istanbul Museum of Painting and Sculpture of the Mimar Sinan Fine Arts University

Galataport also incorporates:

- The Istanbul Modern art museum
- The İstanbul State Art and Sculpture Museum of the Mimar Sinan Fine Arts University
- A Peninsula hotel, built in the old Karaköy Passenger Terminal (Yolcu Salonu) building designed by Rebii Gorbon in 1936 It has a landmark tower on its roof that originally had a clock designed by Mustafa Şem-i, a watchmaker at the court of Sultan Abdülhamid II.
- Other nearby buildings, including the old Customs Building (Turkish: Gümrük Binası) dating back to 1895, are still in the process of being renovated and found new uses.
- 43,000 sqm of office space
- A parking garage for 2,400 cars

== Impact ==
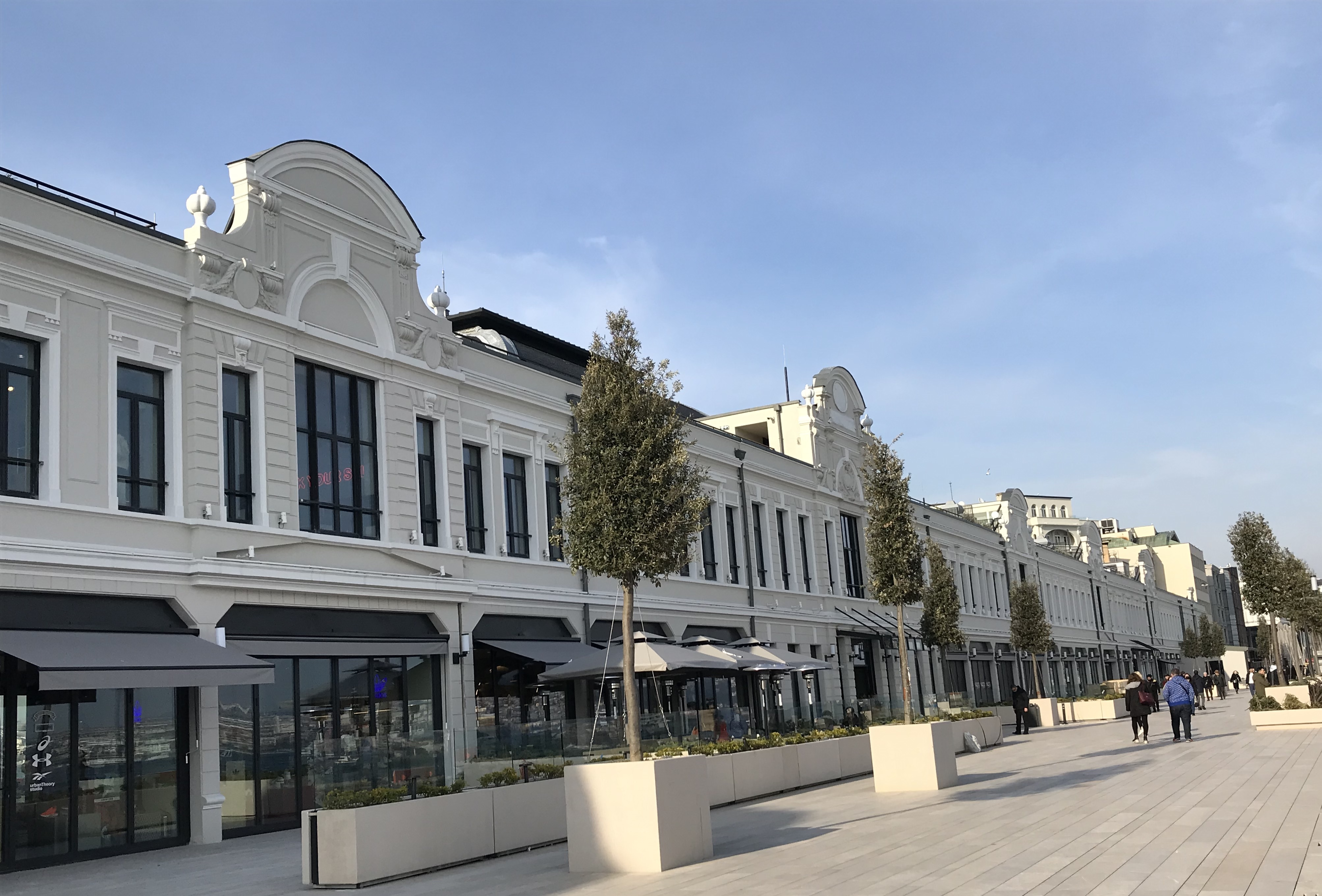
The restored Paket Postanesi (Parcel Post Office) building is now a symbol of Galataport

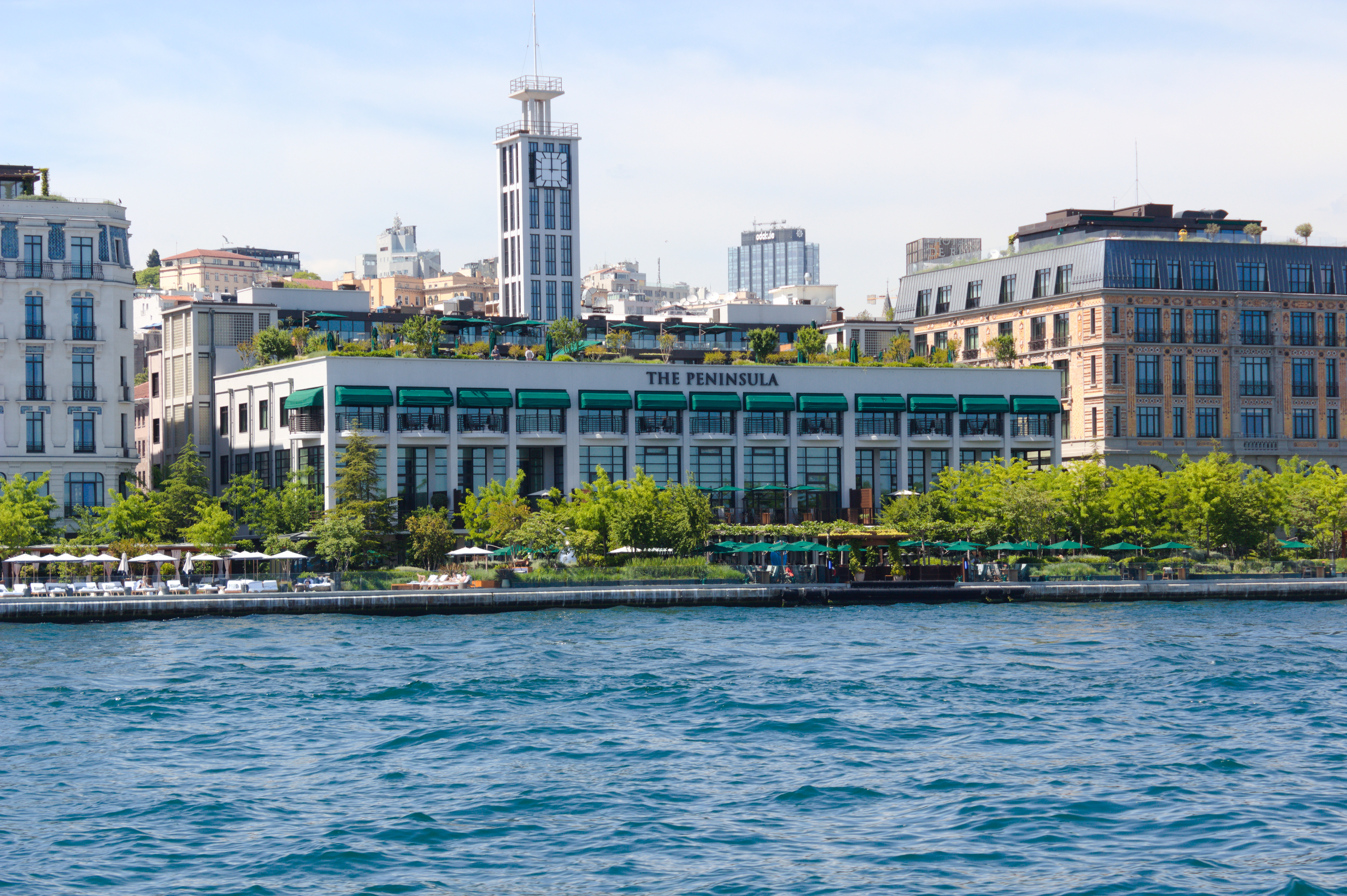
The Peninsula Istanbul, formerly the Karaköy Seaport Passenger Lounge, was renovated as part of the Galataport project

Galataport is a transformative project for Istanbul. Not only will it greatly increase the number of tourists coming into the city in large groups but the adjoining areas of Karaköy and Tophane are already changing as shops and restaurants shift their focus from catering to locals to catering to tourists. In the years leading up to the opening of the new cruise terminal a large number of new hotels had already opened in these areas alongside many properties rented out through Airbnb. These trends are only likely to accelerate now that the port is open.
