= Ostreodes =

Town of ancient Thrace

Coordinates: 41°01′26″N 28°58′36″E

Ostreodes was a town of ancient Thrace, inhabited during Roman times.

Its site is located below Tophane in European Turkey.
