= Nusretiye Clock Tower =

Historic clock tower in Istanbul, Turkey

Coordinates: 41.026711°N 28.982875°E

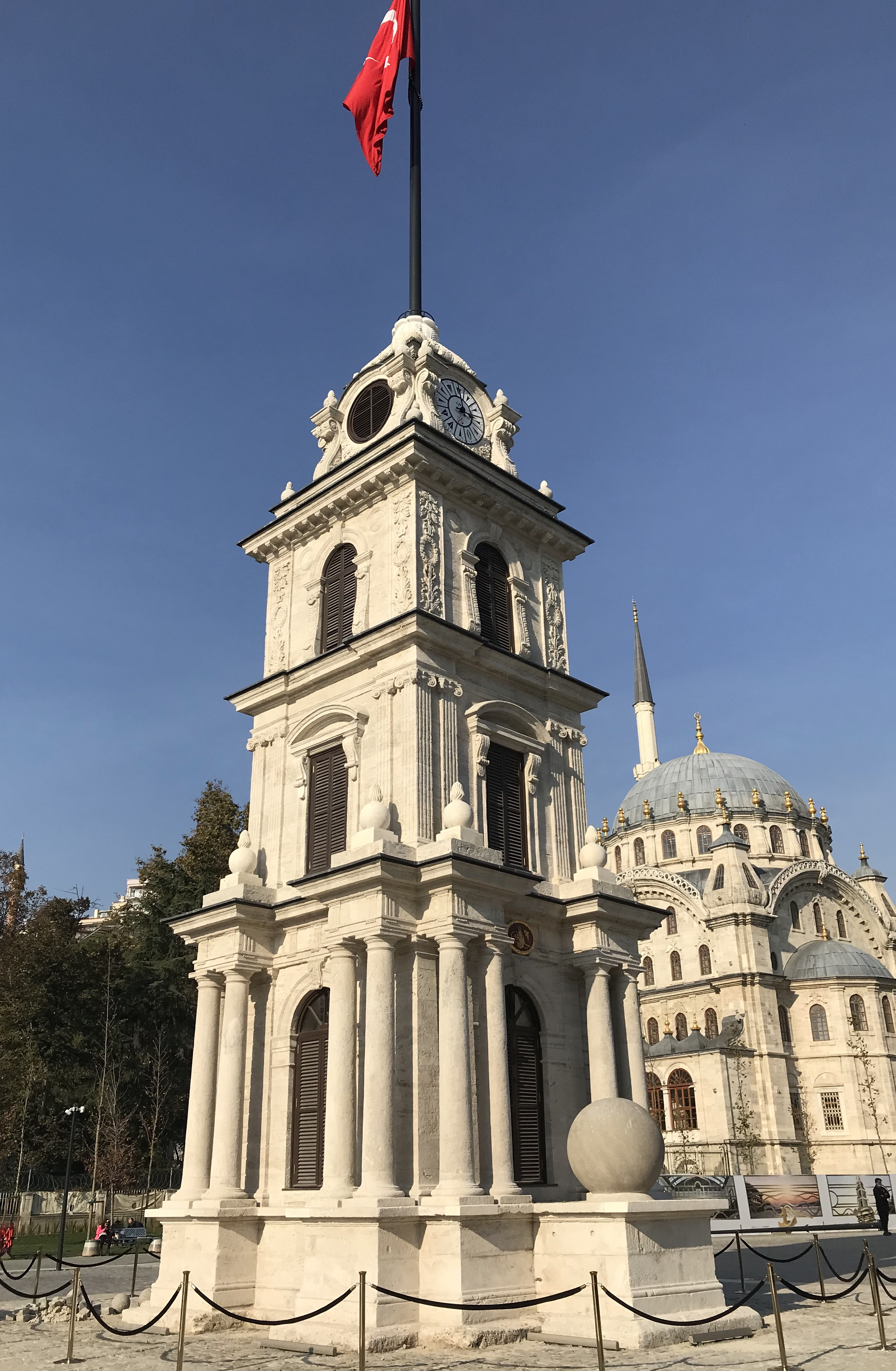
- Interactive map of the Nusretiye Clock Tower area

General information
- Architectural style: Neo-classical
- Location: Turkey

Design and construction
- Architect: Garabet Amira Balyan

Nusretiye Clock Tower, aka Tophane Clock Tower, is a clock tower situated at Tophane, a neighborhood in Beyoğlu district of Istanbul, Turkey, next to Nusretiye Mosque and Tophane Kiosk at the European waterfront of Bosphorus. It was ordered by the Ottoman sultan Abdulmejid I (1823–1861), designed by architect Garabet Amira Balyan and completed in 1848.

Designed in neo-classical style, the four-sided, three-story clock tower is 15 m (49 ft) high. A tughra of Sultan Abdülmecid I is installed above the entrance. The original clock and the clock face are in a state of disrepair. The clock tower along with Nusretiye Mosque and the Tophane Kiosk survived the urban renewal and highway construction program of the mid-1950s. İt is now in front of the İstanbul Modern museum.

== See also ==
- List of columns and towers in Istanbul
