= On the Path to Revolution =

Painting by Zeki Faik İzer

- İnkılâp Yolunda (Turkish)
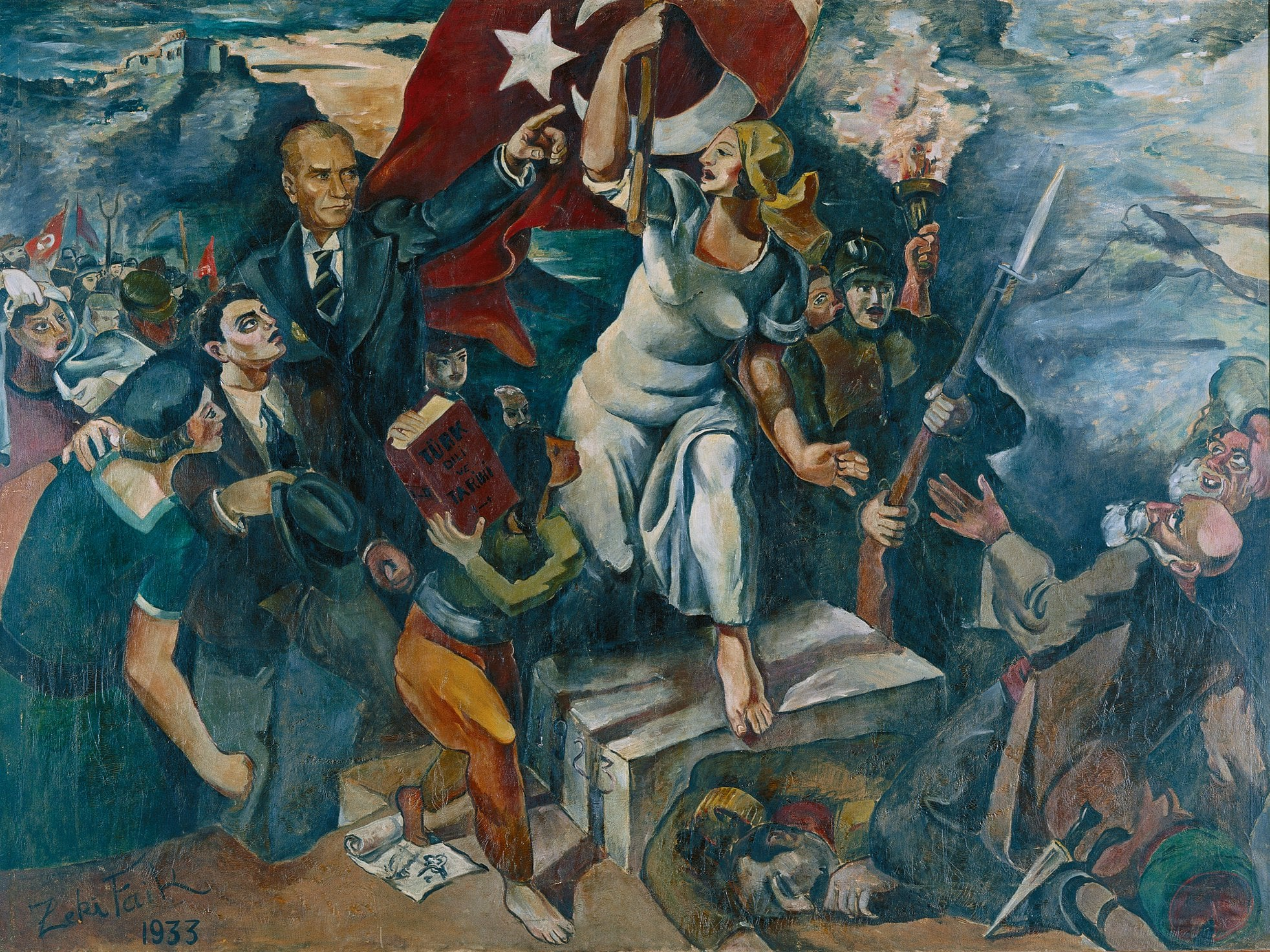
- Artist: Zeki Faik İzer
- Year: 1933
- Medium: Oil on canvas
- Dimensions: 176 cm × 237 cm (69.2 in × 93.3 in)
- Location: Istanbul Museum of Painting and Sculpture

On the Path to Revolution (Turkish: İnkılâp Yolunda) is a painting by the Turkish artist Zeki Faik İzer depicting the Turkish Revolution on the tenth year of the Republic, in an inspiration by Eugéne Delacroix's Liberty Leading the People.

An unnamed Turkish woman, a reference to Marianne, leads the Turkish flag, stepping on a marble that has the year 1923 carved. Next to her, Mustafa Kemal Atatürk in his civilian dress points forward. A child carries a book titled "Turkish Language and History", also treading on a firman written in Arabic script inherited from the Ottoman Empire. On the contrary to the Ottoman dress, the man and the woman on the left are in western wear, symbolizing the Hat Revolution. The Turkish soldier behind the woman fights people who are supposed to be radical Islamists and bigots that Kemalism considers to be enemies of the regime.

== History ==
Commemorating the tenth year of the Republic of Turkey, the Turkish government determined to hold a series of Revolutionary Exhibitions (Turkish: İnkılâp Sergileri), starting from the capital Ankara. Zeki Faik İzer, who was a part of the D Grubu, an artist collective based in Istanbul, intended to create an artefact that would represent the values of the recent Turkish Revolution.

According to İzer, the idea for the piece belongs to Ali Hadi Bara, a prominent Turkish sculptor. It was later presented at the Istanbul Museum of Painting and Sculpture, which was visited by Mustafa Kemal Atatürk ─ according to Halil Dikmen, Turkish painter and the museum director, he showed a deep interest at the symbolism behind On the Path to Revolution. It was criticized among the art community for being an "imitation", yet İzer acknowledged that it was inspired by Eugéne Delacroix and he "intended to make younger generations recognize him". He also expressed that he, in Delacroix, found freedom and the presence of a romantic work.

== See also ==
- Kemalism
