= Runner (sculpture) =

2017 artwork by Tony Cragg

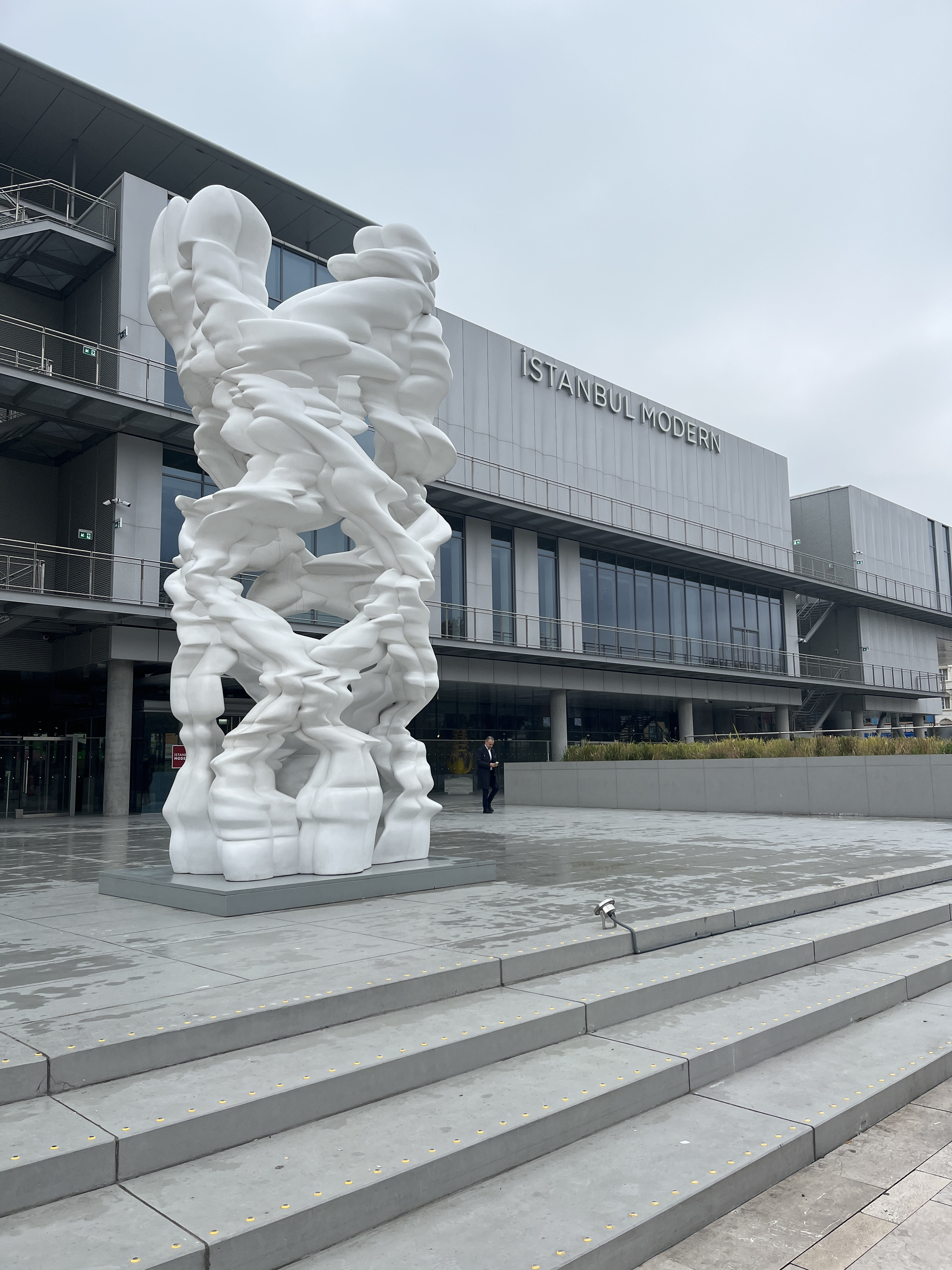
- The sculpture outside the Istanbul Modern in 2013
- Artist: Tony Cragg
- Year: 2017
- Medium: fiberglass

Runner is a fiberglass sculpture by English-German artist Tony Cragg, from 2017. It was installed outside the Istanbul Modern, in Turkey. The 6-meter-tall white artwork is on loan to the museum by the artist on a longterm basis.

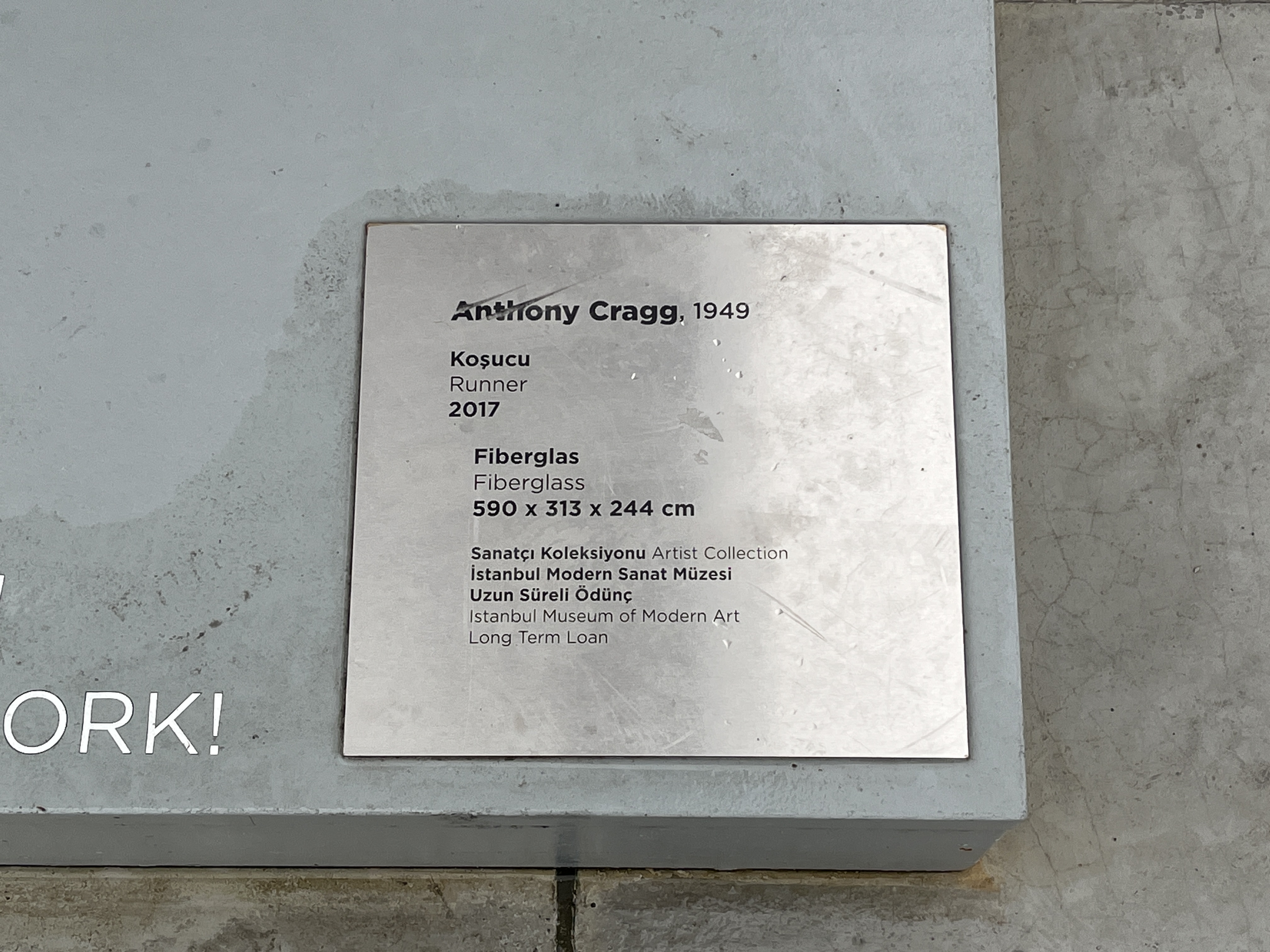
Plaque for the sculpture

For Runner, the artist wanted to "show the inner life under a rigid surface, making that energy and motion perceivable". Oya Eczacıbaşı, chair of the museum's board, said: "We are honored to receive this sculpture as a long-term loan ahead of the opening of our museum's new building. I believe that this sculpture by Cragg, an artist whose works attract curiosity and interest from every generation, will become one of the symbols of Istanbul Modern's new building."

== See also ==
- 2017 in art
