= Istanbul Museum of Painting and Sculpture =

Istanbul Painting and Sculpture Museum
- İstanbul Resim ve Heykel Müzesi
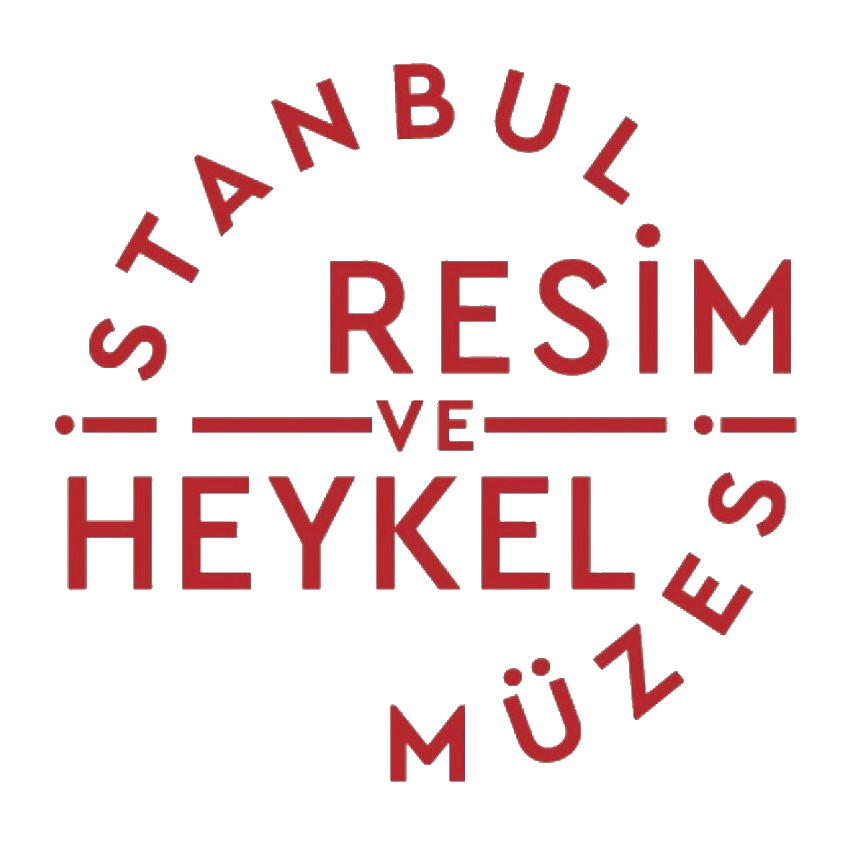

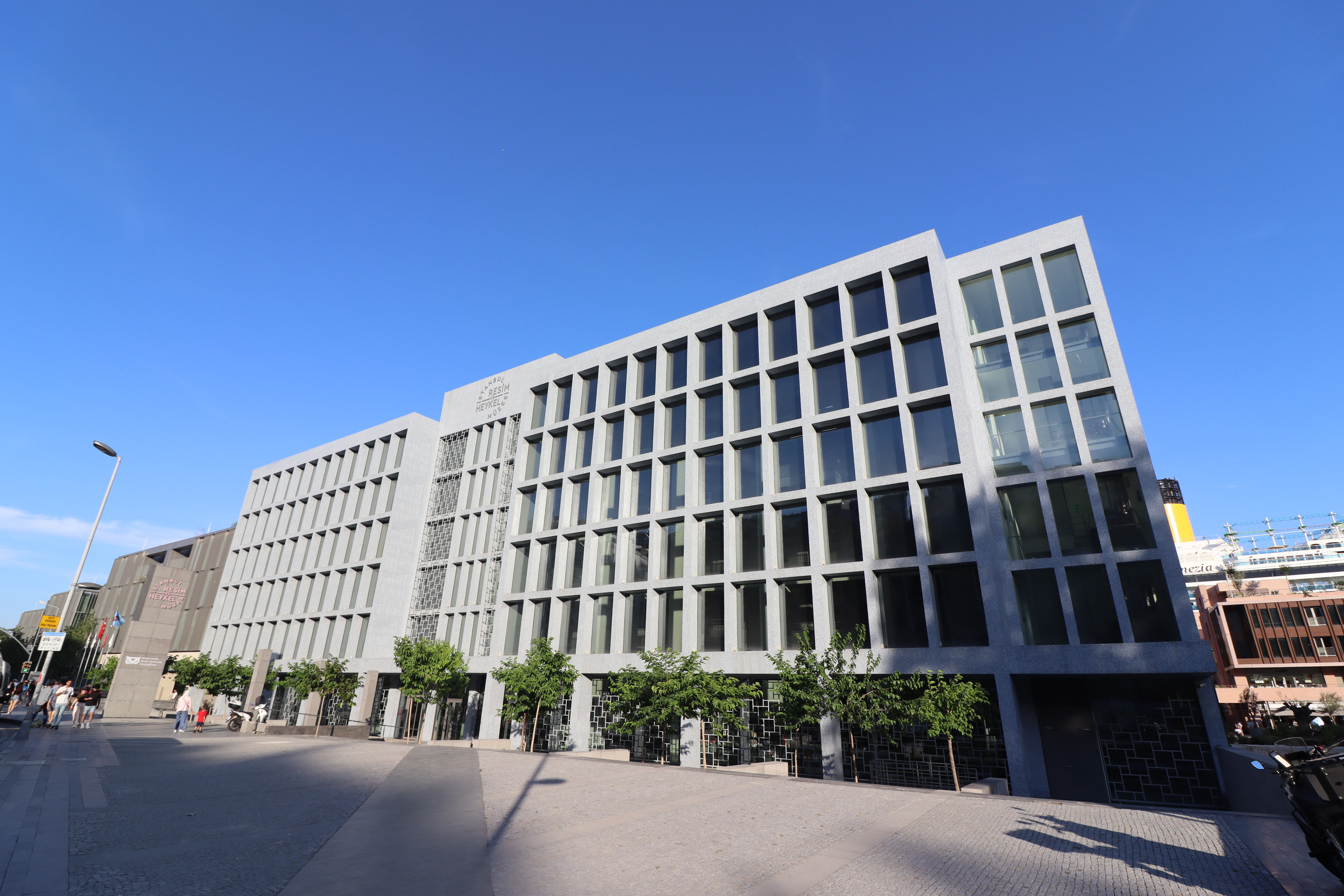

- Location within Istanbul
- Established: 1937; 89 years ago
- Location: Vişnezade, Beşiktaş, Istanbul, Turkey
- Coordinates: 41°02′19″N 28°59′56″E
- Type: Art museum
- Website: irhm.msgsu.edu.tr

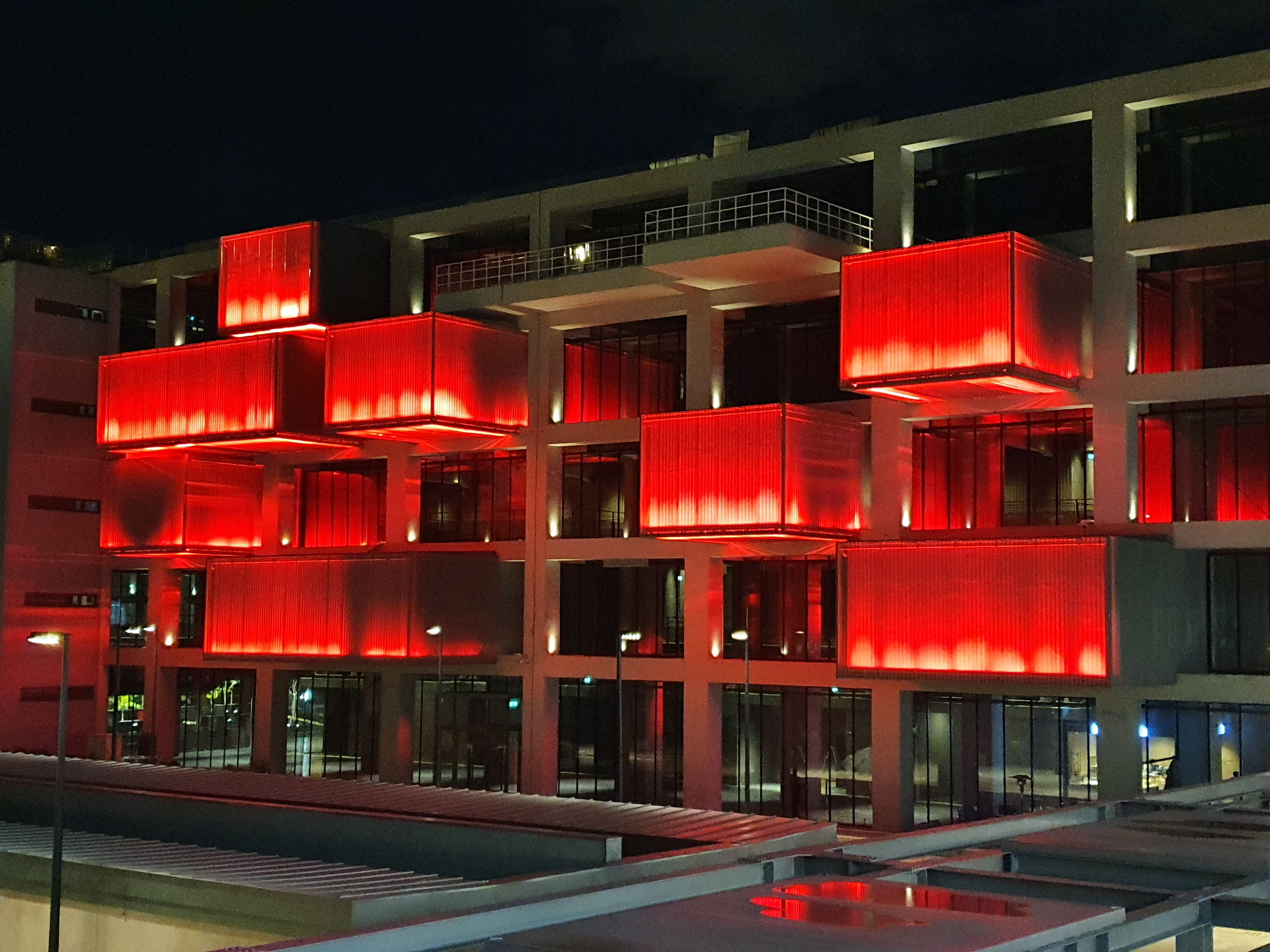
Istanbul Museum of Painting and Sculpture at night

The Istanbul Painting and Sculpture Museum (Turkish: İstanbul Resim ve Heykel Müzesi) is a museum in the Tophane area of European Istanbul, Turkey. It is part of the large Galataport complex.

The museum was originally housed in the mansion of the crown prince attached to the Dolmabahçe Palace in the Beşiktaş neighbourhood of Istanbul.The building housing it dated back to 1856. On 20 September 1937, Mustafa Kemal Atatürk, the founder of the Turkish Republic, suggested its conversion into a museum since the imperial family had been driven into exile with the coming of the Turkish Republic.

It has now been moved into a new gallery on the edge of the Galataport where it is very close to the Istanbul Modern gallery, turning the area into an artistic hub for the city. The building chosen - Antrepo No 5 - was originally designed to serve the old port at Karaköy by the Turkish architect Sedad Hakkı Eldem. It has been demolished and rebuilt with Sedad Hakkı Eldems design in mind to serve as an art gallery by the Emre Arolat firm of architects.

The museum started to open in December 2021 and is expected to fully open in September 2022.

== Museum Contents ==
The new museum exhibits Turkish painting and sculpture from late Ottoman times through to modern times. A whole gallery is devoted to the work of Osman Hamdi Bey, the founder of Istanbul's first school of art and himself a painter.

Another gallery exhibits examples of modern calligraphy alongside examples of Turkish abstract art, developed from the 1940s onwards, by such artists as Şemsettin Arel and Abidin Elderoğlu. who were influenced by traditional calligraphy.

Another gallery shows paintings developed by Turkish artists send on 'Homeland Journeys' (Yurt Geziler in Turkish) into Anatolia in the early years of the Turkish Republic so that they could reflect the culture of the whole country and not just that of Istanbul, the artistic capital, in their work .

Another gallery displays copies of paintings hanging in overseas museums made by Turkish artists in the early days of the Republic when Osman Hamdi Bey and his brother, Halil Edhem Eldem, thought this would help develop a new figurative art tradition for the country.

== Notable paintings at the museum ==
- On the Path to Revolution
