= Tophane =

Quarter of Istanbul, Turkey

- Quarter
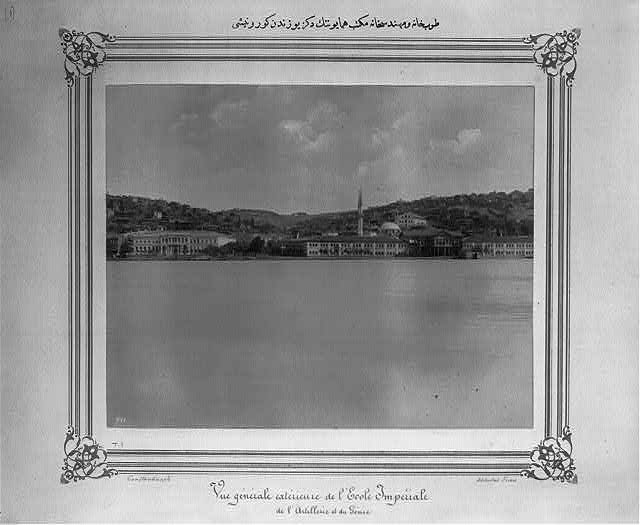
- Tophane skyline seen from Bosphorus

- Location within Istanbul
- Coordinates: 41.02739°N 28.98228°E
- Country: Turkey
- Region: Marmara
- Province: Istanbul
- District: Beyoğlu
- Time zone: UTC+3 (TRT)
- Postal code: 34425
- Area code: 0212

Tophane (Turkish pronunciation: [topˈhane]) (lit. "Armoury") is a quarter in the Beyoğlu district of Istanbul, Turkey, running downhill from Galata to the shore of the Bosphorus where it joins up with Karaköy to the southwest and Fındıklı to the northeast.

In the Ottoman era, it was the city's first industrial zone.

Despite rapid gentrification, parts of Tophane remain conservative and there have been clashes over some developments in the area. In 2021 the large new Galataport cruise terminal opened at the point where Tophane reaches the shore, bringing the likelihood of even faster change to the area.

== History ==
Tophane acquired its name from the Tophane-i Amire armoury (Ottoman Turkish: طوپخانه امیری; English: Imperial armoury), which was first built in the reign (1451–1481) of the Ottoman Sultan Mehmed II. Its main purpose was the manufacture of cannons and cannonballs. It appears in an engraving by Antoine Melling (1763–1831). The foundry was built on the site of the lost churches of St Claire and Aya Photini.

The original foundry was rebuilt during the reign of Sultan Süleyman the Magnificent and then again in 1803 during the reign of Sultan Selim III. Part of that structure still survives with tiny carved cannons on its facade commemorating its original purpose. It is now used for temporary art exhibitions. Other parts of the barracks were demolished in 1958 when the main coastal road was widened. Excavations on the inland side of the coast road are uncovering some remains of the old barracks buildings.

Today the foundry building houses the Tophane-i Amire Culture and Art Center, a part of the Sabancı Vakfı that organises temporary art exhibitions.

The small clock tower, one of the first in Istanbul, was added to the complex in 1848-49. It is now the focal point of a new square created as part of the Galataport project.

The baroque Nusretiye (Victory) Mosque was built for Sultan Mahmud II between 1823 and 1826; its name commemorates the "Auspicious Incident" when he overthrew the powerful Janissary corps.

The landmark Kılıç Ali Pasha Complex (Külliye) was commissioned by the Ottoman Admiral Kılıç Ali Pasha and designed by the renowned architect Mimar Sinan. It consists of a mosque, medrese, hamam, türbe, and sebil that were constructed between 1578 and 1587.

Nearby, the large free-standing Tophane Fountain between the Nusretiye and Kılıç Ali Pasha Mosques was commissioned by Mahmud I and built in 1732. It stands on the site of the old military parade ground.

In 2022 the Tophane Pavilion (Tophane Kasrı), designed by William James Smith in 1852 to provide the sultan with a base from which to inspect his troops, was undergoing renovation.

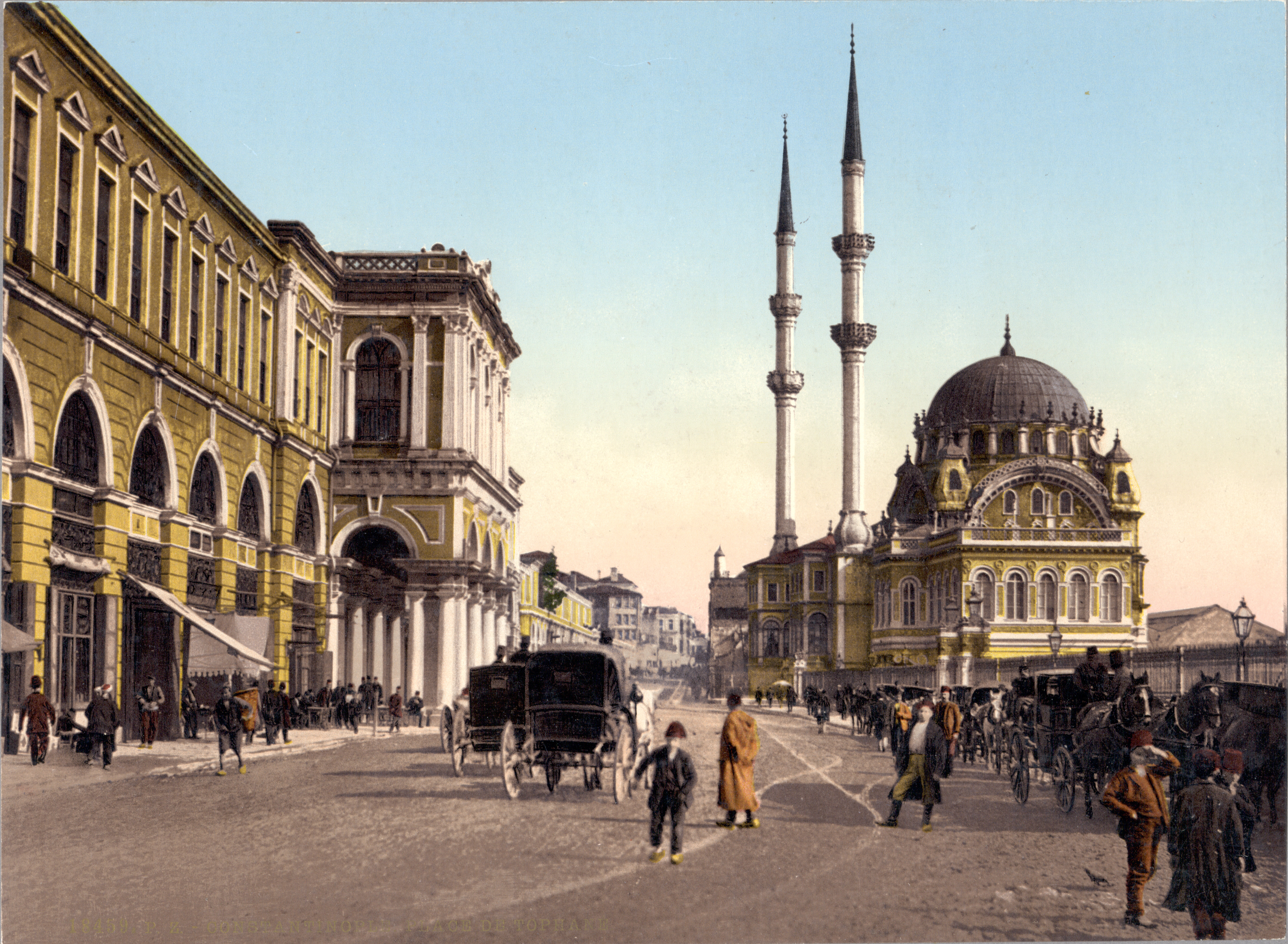
Tophane Square, with the Tophane Barracks on the left and the Nusretiye Mosque on the right, in ca. 1890–1900.

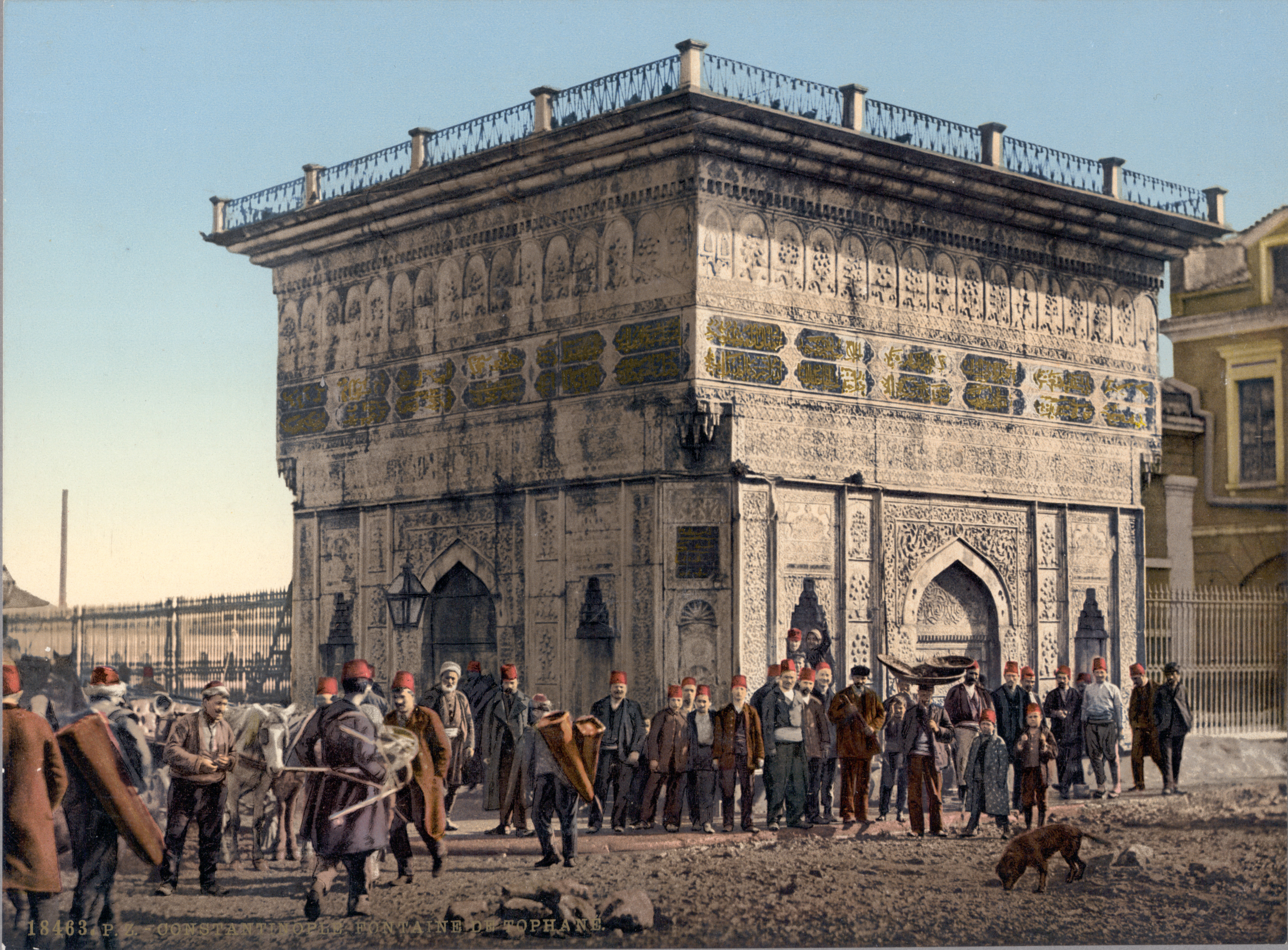
Tophane Fountain in ca. 1890–1900.

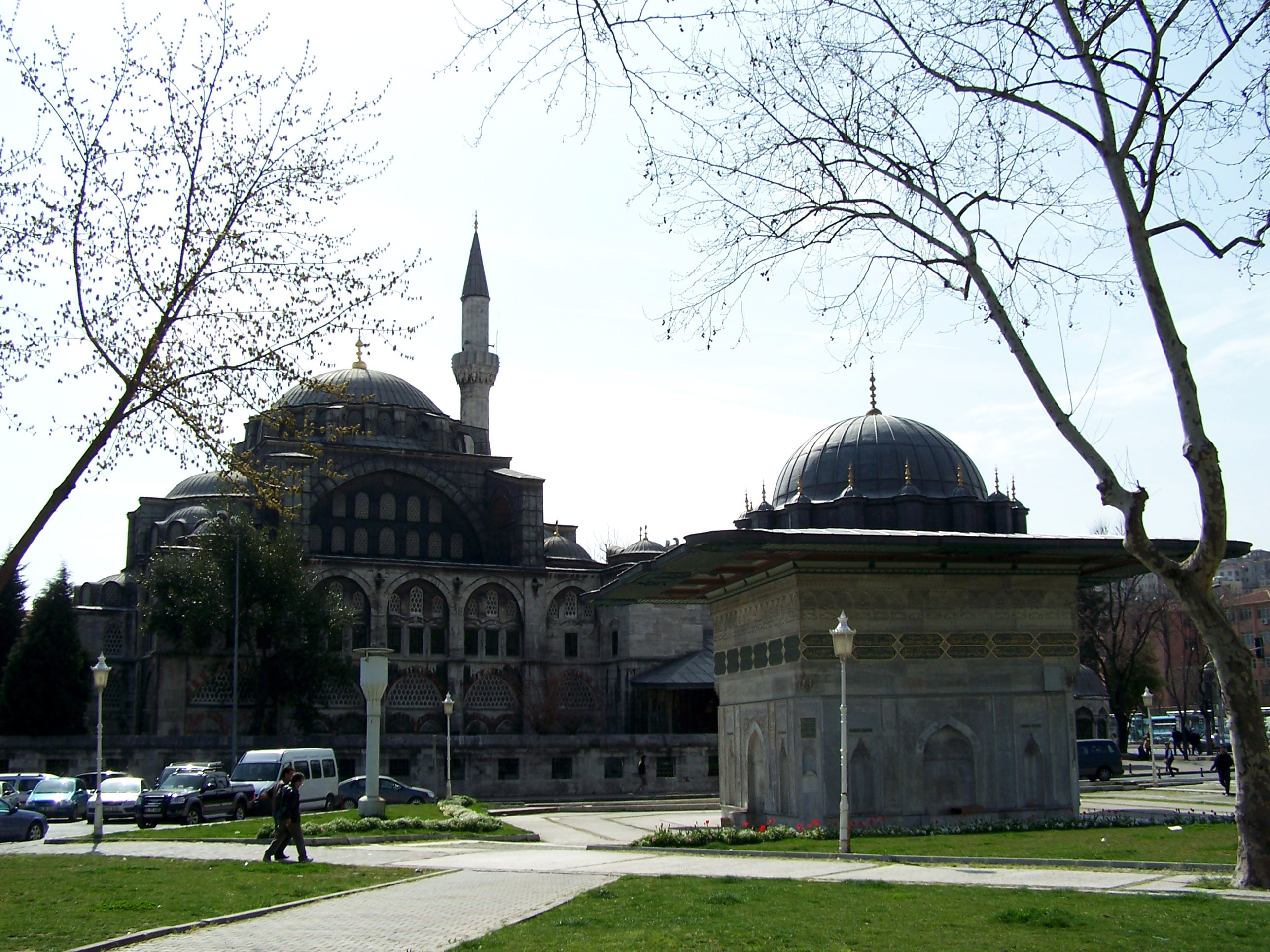
Kılıç Ali Pasha Mosque and Külliye in Tophane.

Tophane Fountain in late 19th Century

Tophane late 19th Century

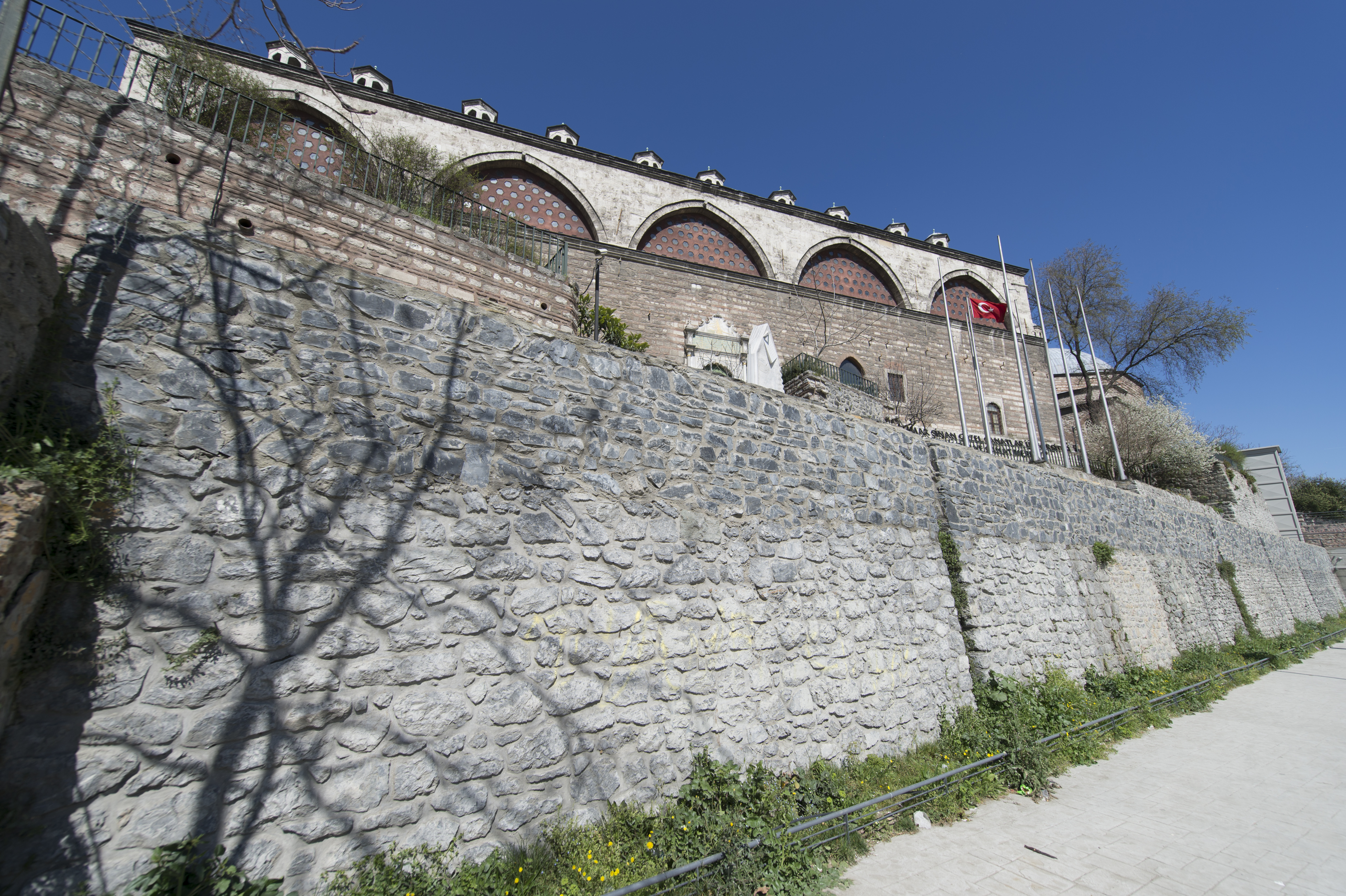
Istanbul Tophane exterior

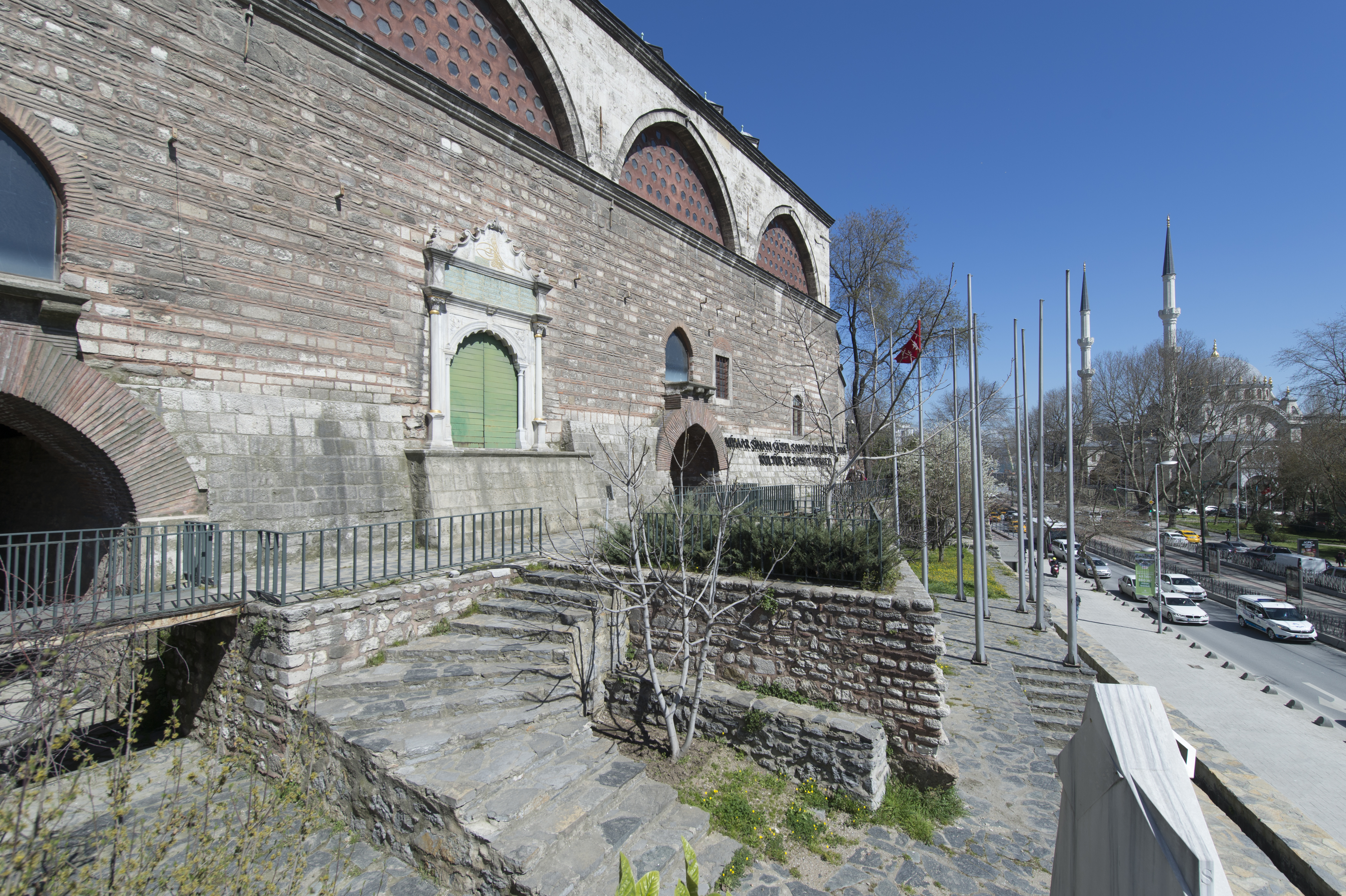
Istanbul Tophane exterior

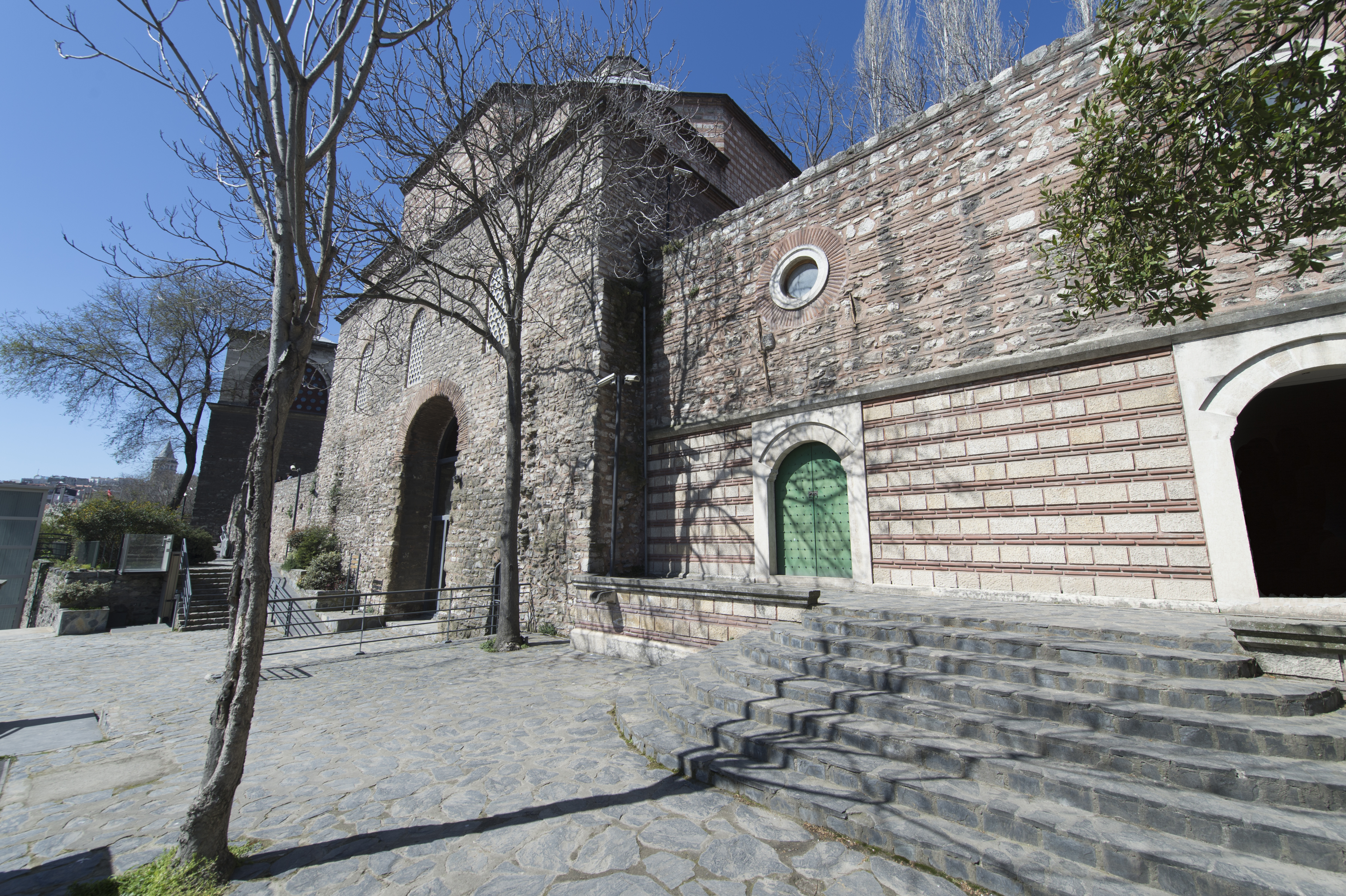
Istanbul Tophane exterior

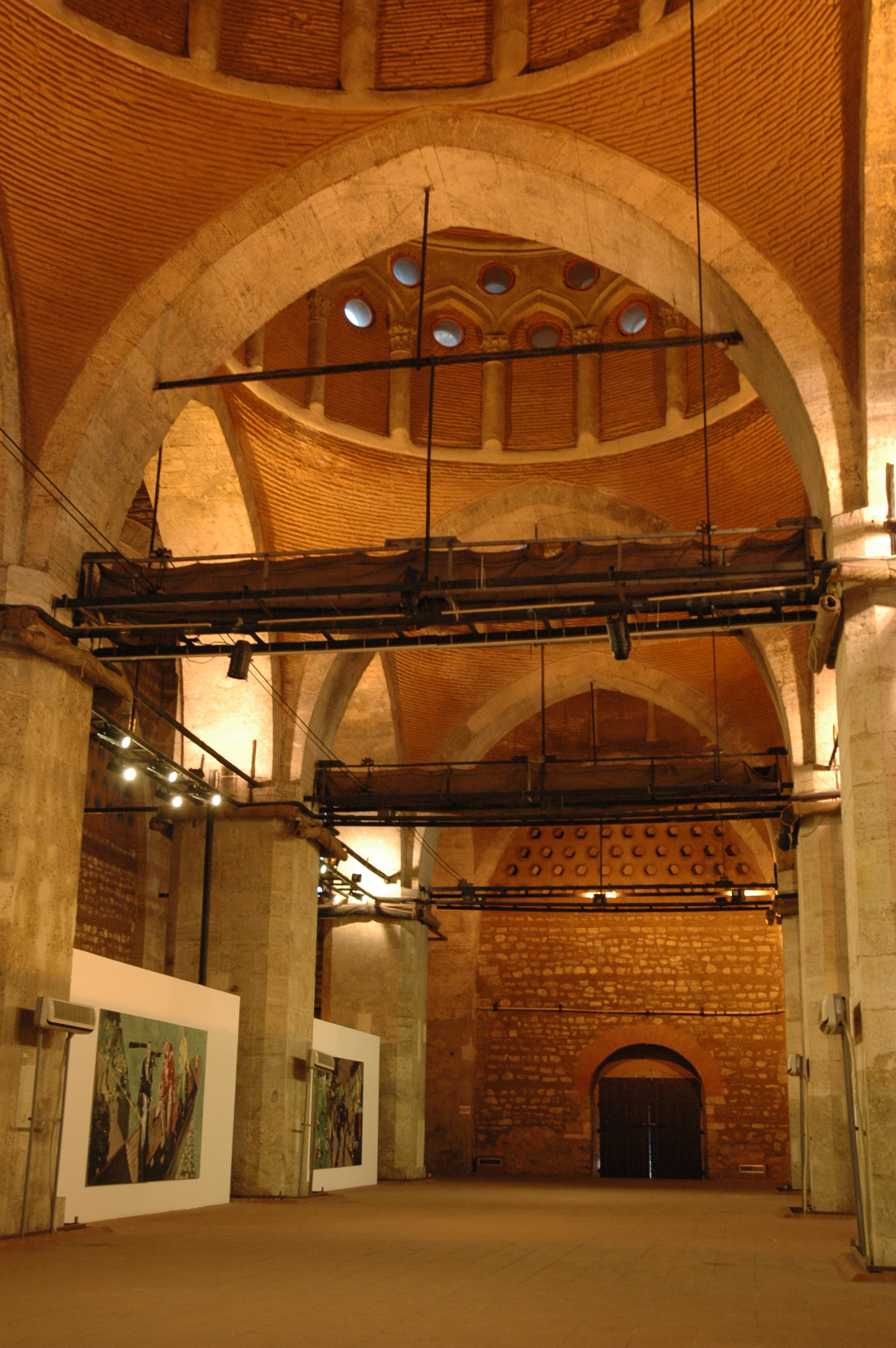
Istanbul Tophane interior

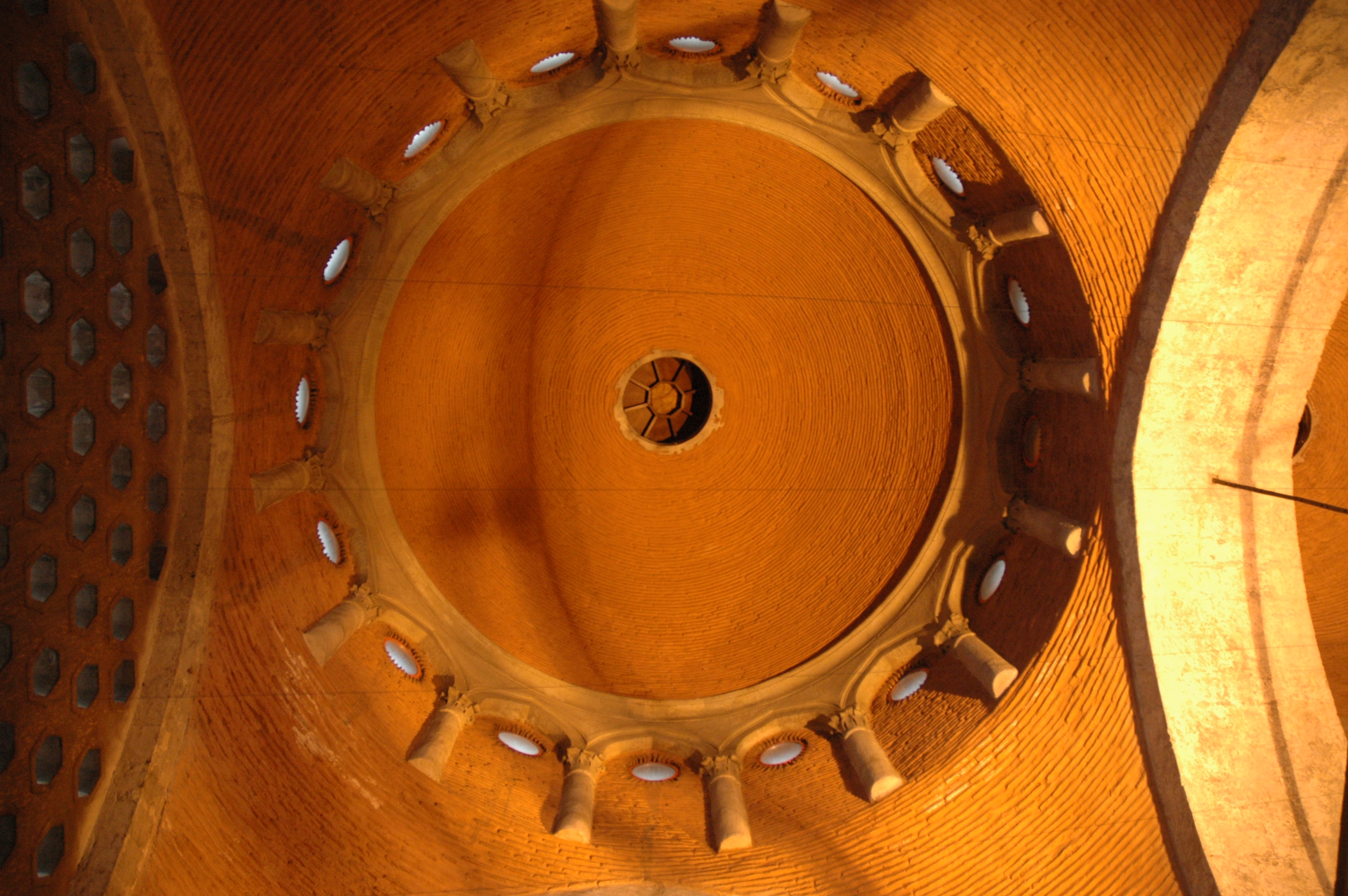
Istanbul Tophane interior

== Population ==
At one time Tophane was home to many Greeks, Armenians and Jews but in the early twentieth century many migrants from the Eastern Anatolian provinces of Siirt, Bitlis, Erzincan, Erzurum arrived to take their place and work in the dockyards and industrial zone.

== Galataport ==
After the opening of the waterfront Galataport cruise terminal and shopping complex in 2022, the area has undergone gentrification and has become a major tourist destination.

The Istanbul Modern, a contemporary art museum established in 2004, is one of several cultural organisations now incorporated into the Galataport area as well as the Istanbul Painting and Sculpture Museum.
