= Nusretiye Mosque =

Mosque in Beyoğlu, Istanbul, Turkey

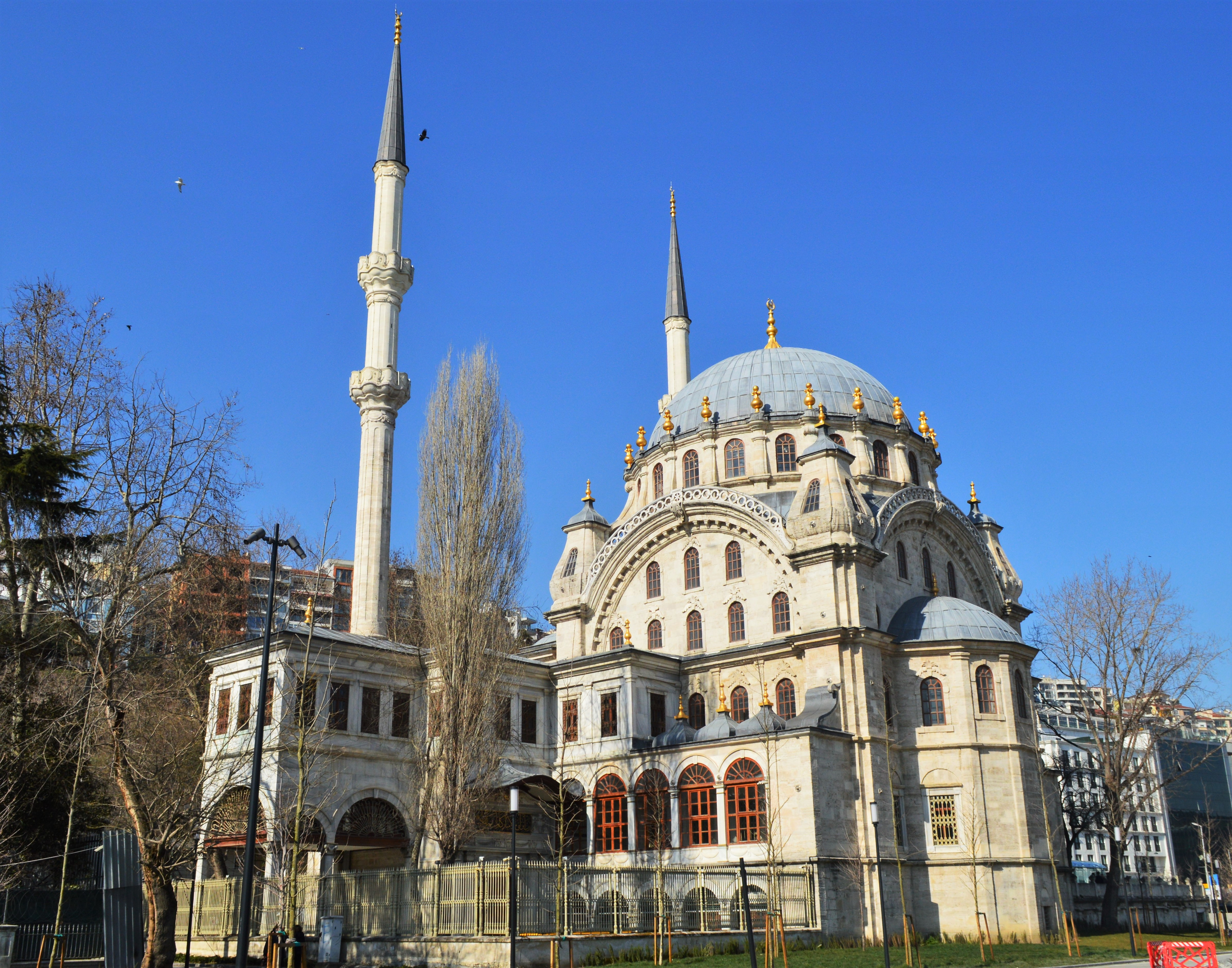

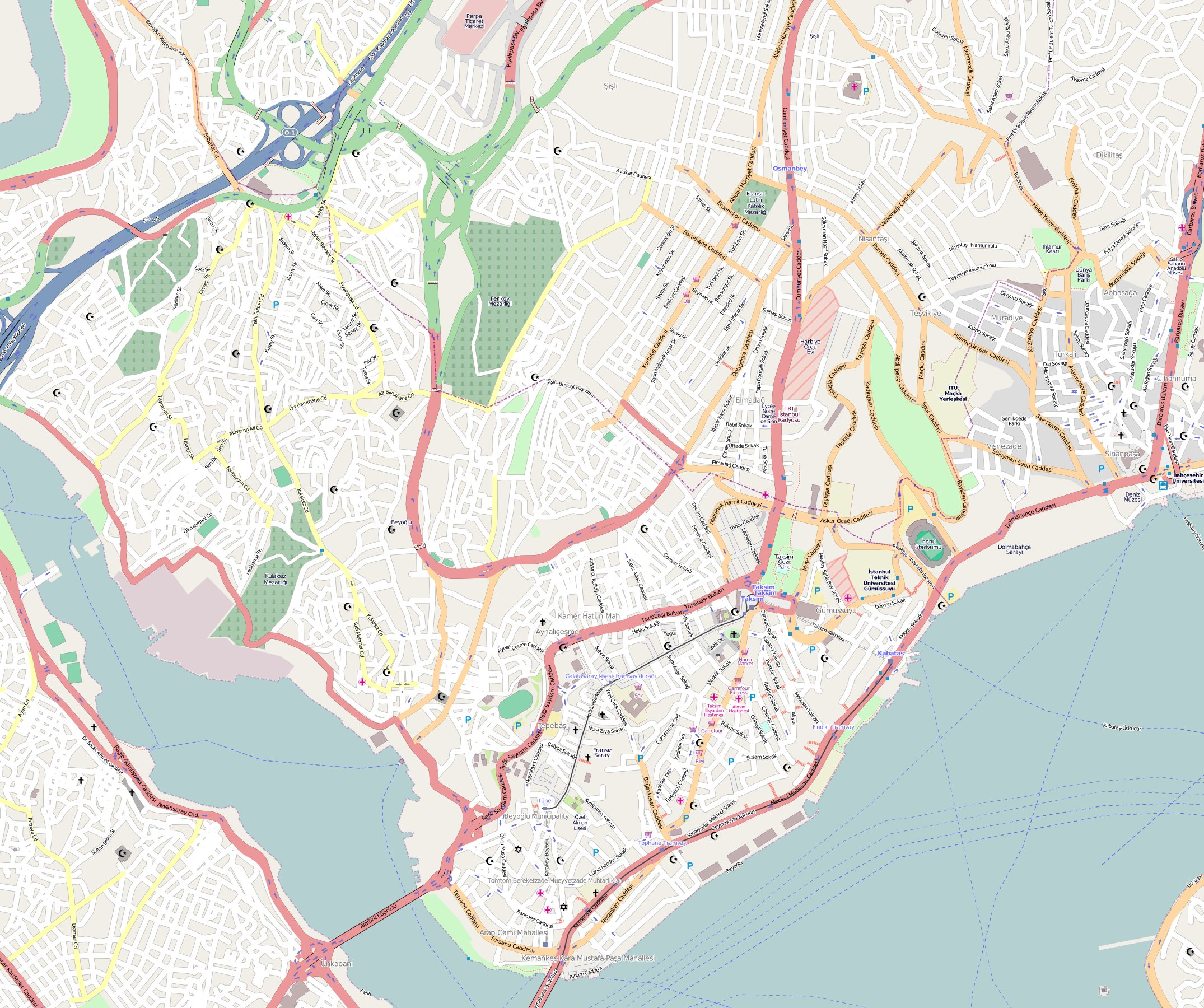
- Location in the Beyoğlu district of Istanbul

Religion
- Affiliation: Islam

Location
- Location: Istanbul, Turkey
- Coordinates: 41°01′38.38″N 28°58′59.38″E

Architecture
- Architect: Krikor Balyan
- Type: Mosque
- Style: Ottoman Baroque, Neoclassical
- Groundbreaking: 1822
- Completed: 1826
- Minaret: 2

The Nusretiye Mosque (Turkish: Nusretiye Camii) is an ornate mosque located in Tophane district of Beyoğlu, Istanbul, Turkey. It was built in 1823–1826 by Sultan Mahmud II.

== Historical background ==
The mosque was commissioned by Mahmud II and built between 1822 and 1826 in the Tophane neighbourhood. Its name commemorates the "victory" which Mahmud II won by destroying the Janissaries in 1826, the year of the mosque's completion. Mahmud II also built a new artillery barracks and parade ground near the mosque at the same time, replacing the barracks which had been built on this site by his predecessor Selim III and which had been recently destroyed by the Janissaries. This continued Tophane's association with the age of reforms initiated by Selim III.

Sometime between 1835 and 1839 Mahmud II erected what is now the oldest clock tower in Istanbul, the Tophane Clock Tower, near the mosque. The tower was rebuilt in more monumental form by Abdulmejid in 1848 or 1849.

== Architecture ==
The mosque is the first major imperial work by Krikor Balian, from the prominent Balian family of Armenian-Ottoman architects. It is sometimes described as belonging to the Empire style, but is considered by scholar Godfrey Goodwin and Doğan Kuban as one of the last Ottoman Baroque mosques. Ünver Rüstem describes the style as moving away from the Baroque and towards an Ottoman interpretation of Neoclassicism. Goodwin also describes it as the last in a line of late imperial mosques that started with the Nuruosmaniye Mosque in the 18th century.

The mosque follows the model of Selim III's imperial mosque in Üsküdar, as seen in some of its details and in the portico and double-winged imperial pavilion fronting the mosque. The mosque was innovative in other details such as the greater use of vaults and stairways, the use of wood instead of stone for elements like stairs, and in the decoration of the dome where the traditional circular Arabic inscription is replaced with a vegetal foliate motif. Despite its relatively small size the mosque's tall proportions creates a sense of height, which may the culmination of a trend that began with the Ayazma Mosque. From the outside, the mosque's most notable details are the extreme slenderness of its minarets and its two Rococo-style sebils which have flamboyantly undulating surfaces.

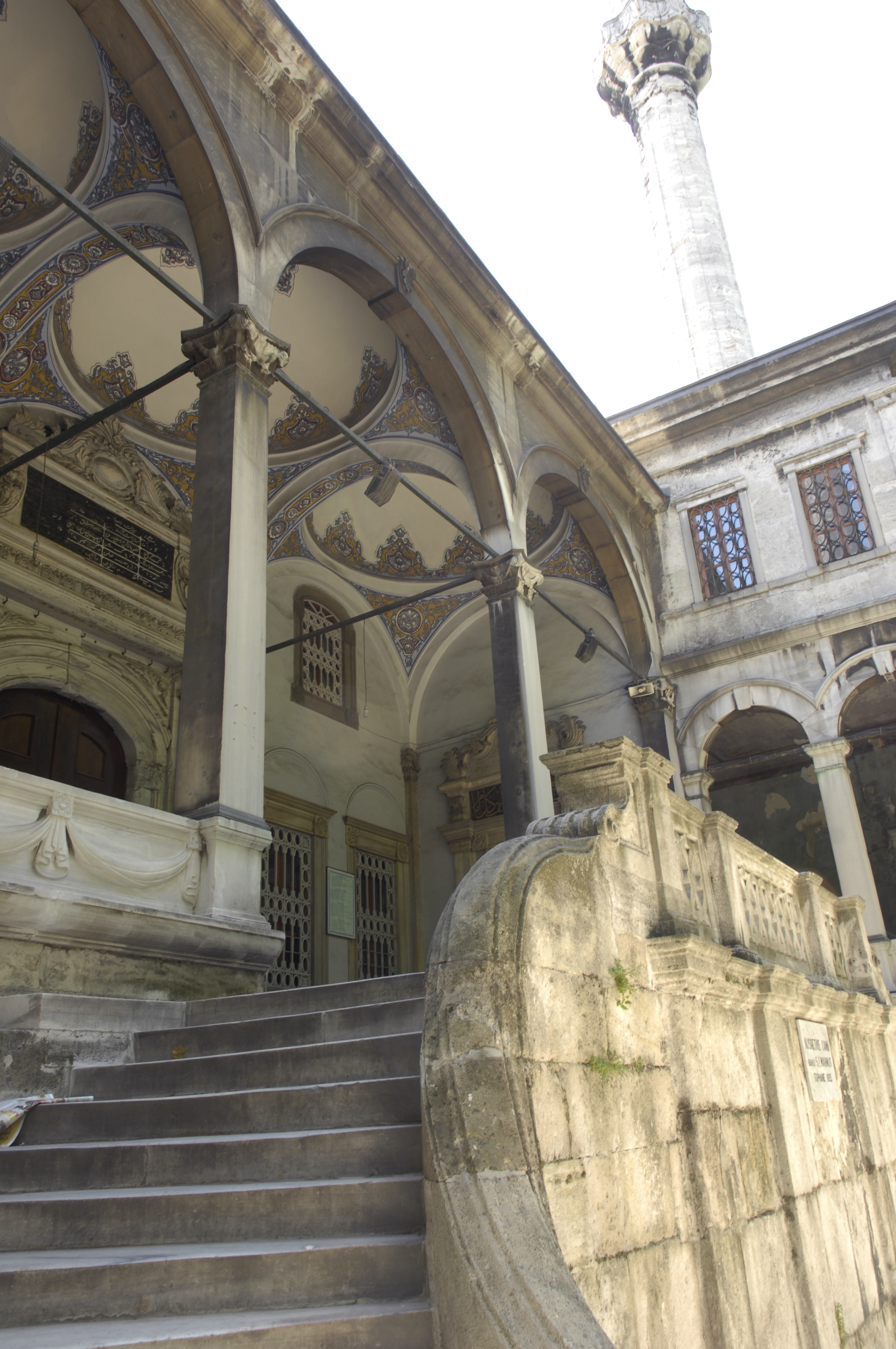
Front porch and stairs at the mosque entrance

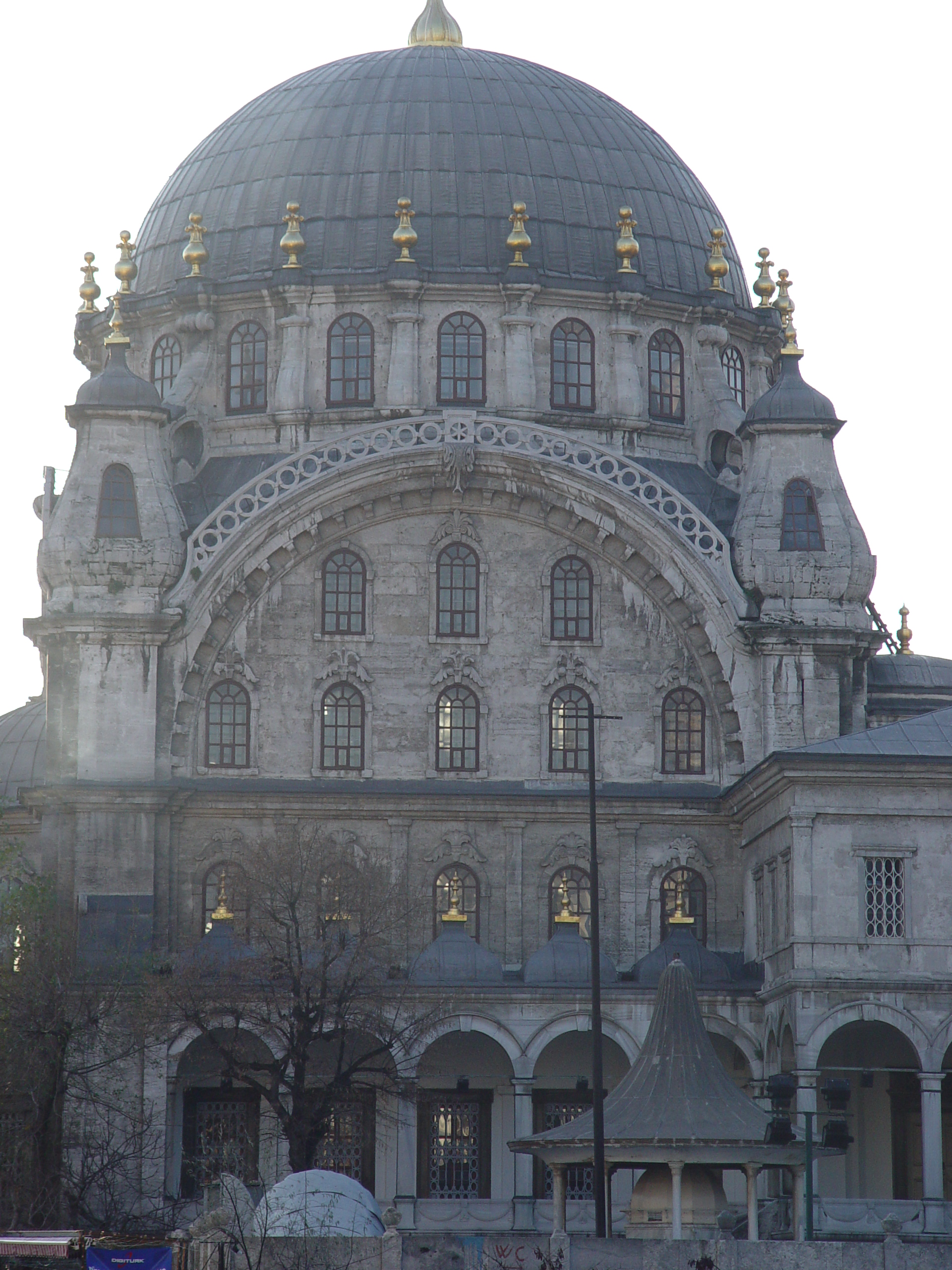
Side view of the mosque

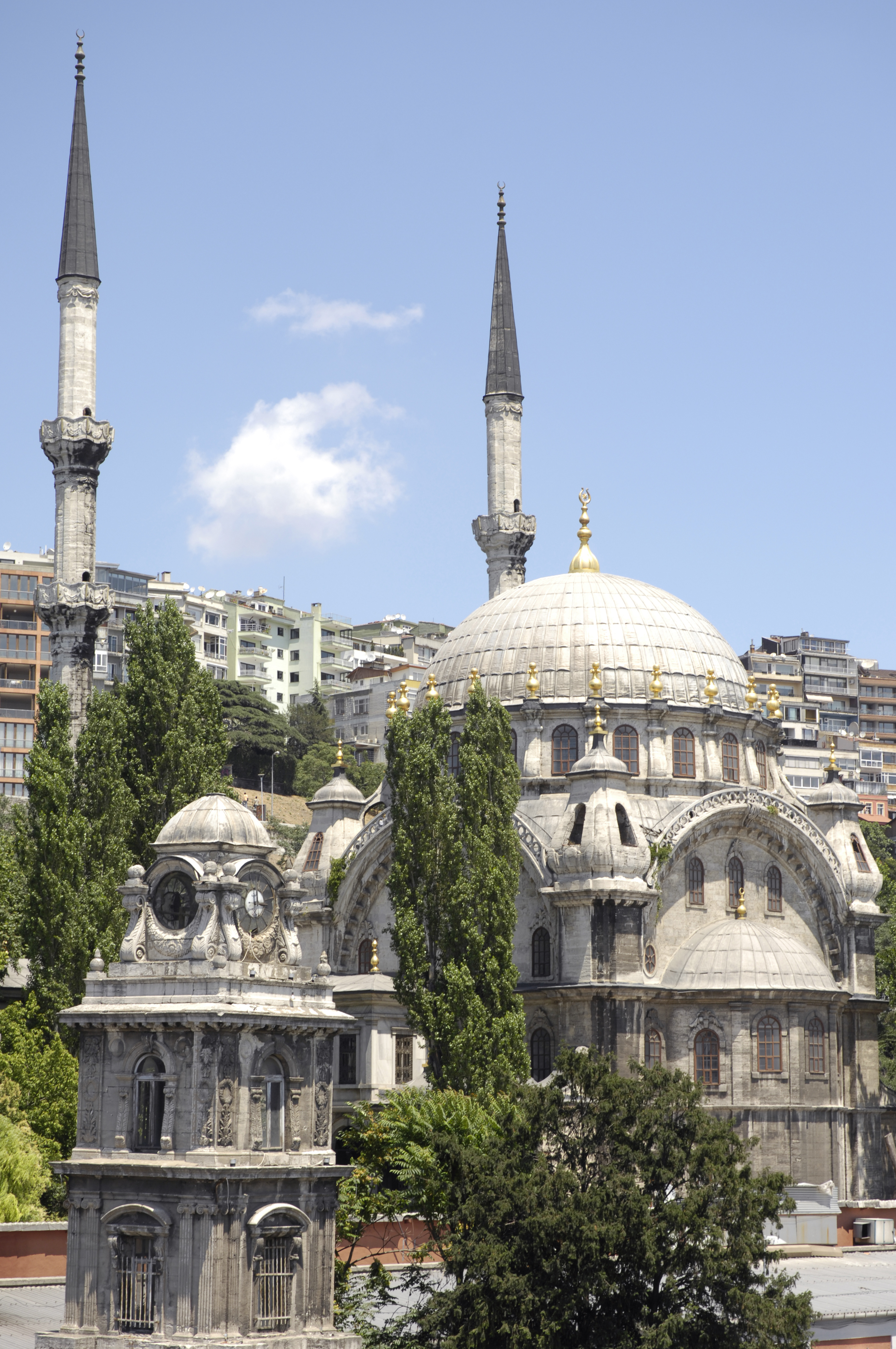
Nusretiye Mosque seen from (then) Istanbul Modern museum

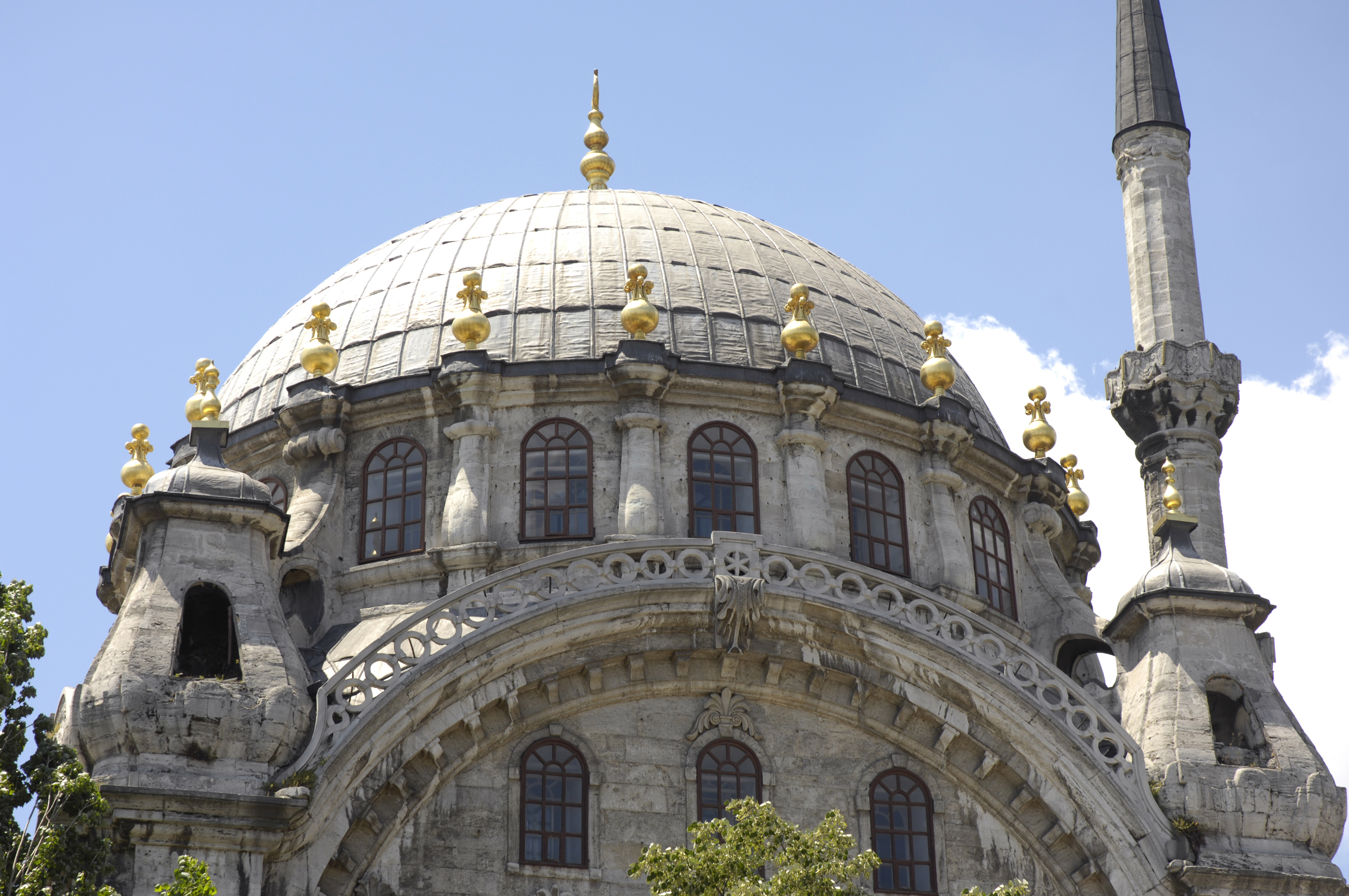
Detail of the dome

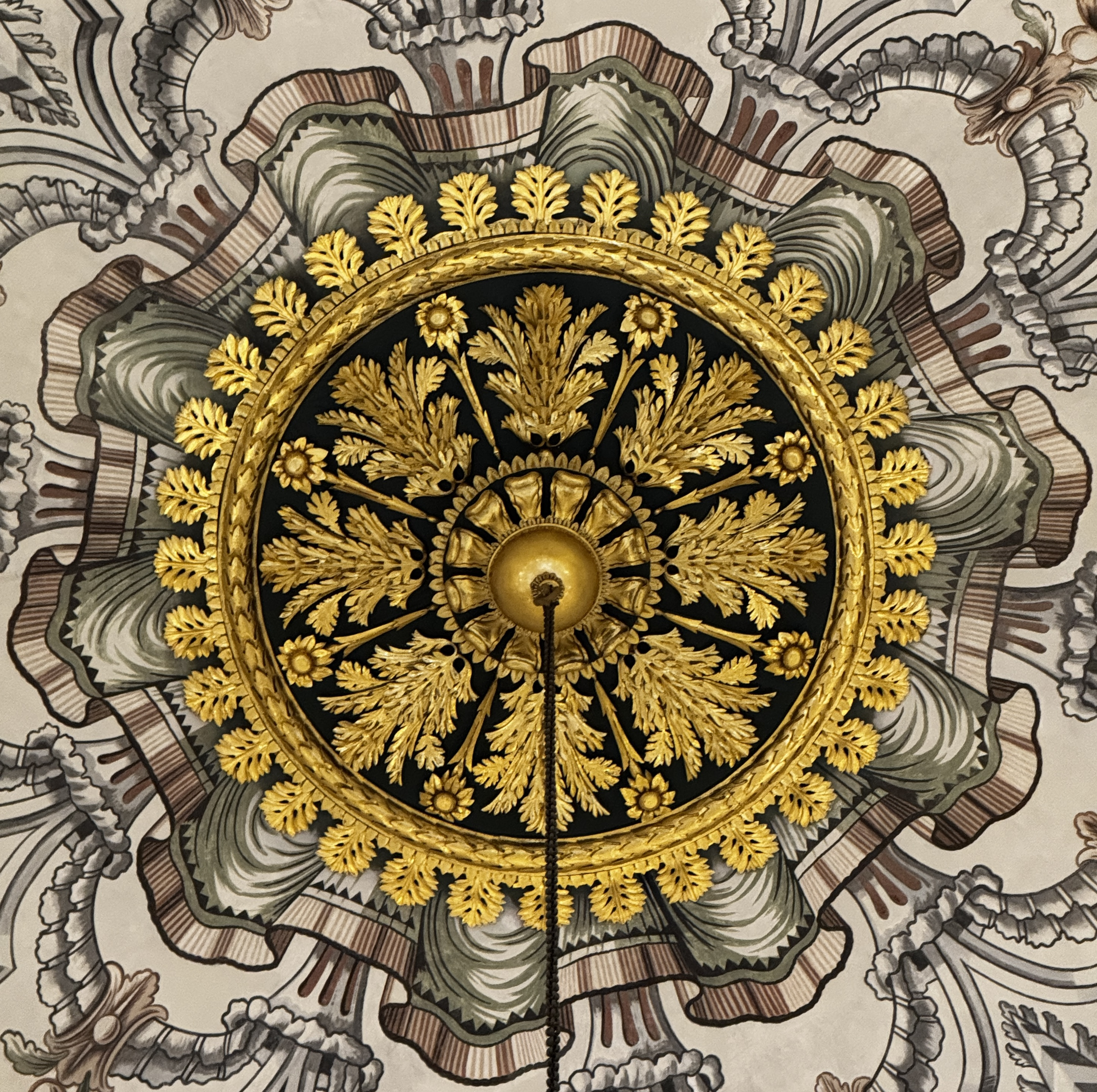
Decoration at the apex of the dome's interior

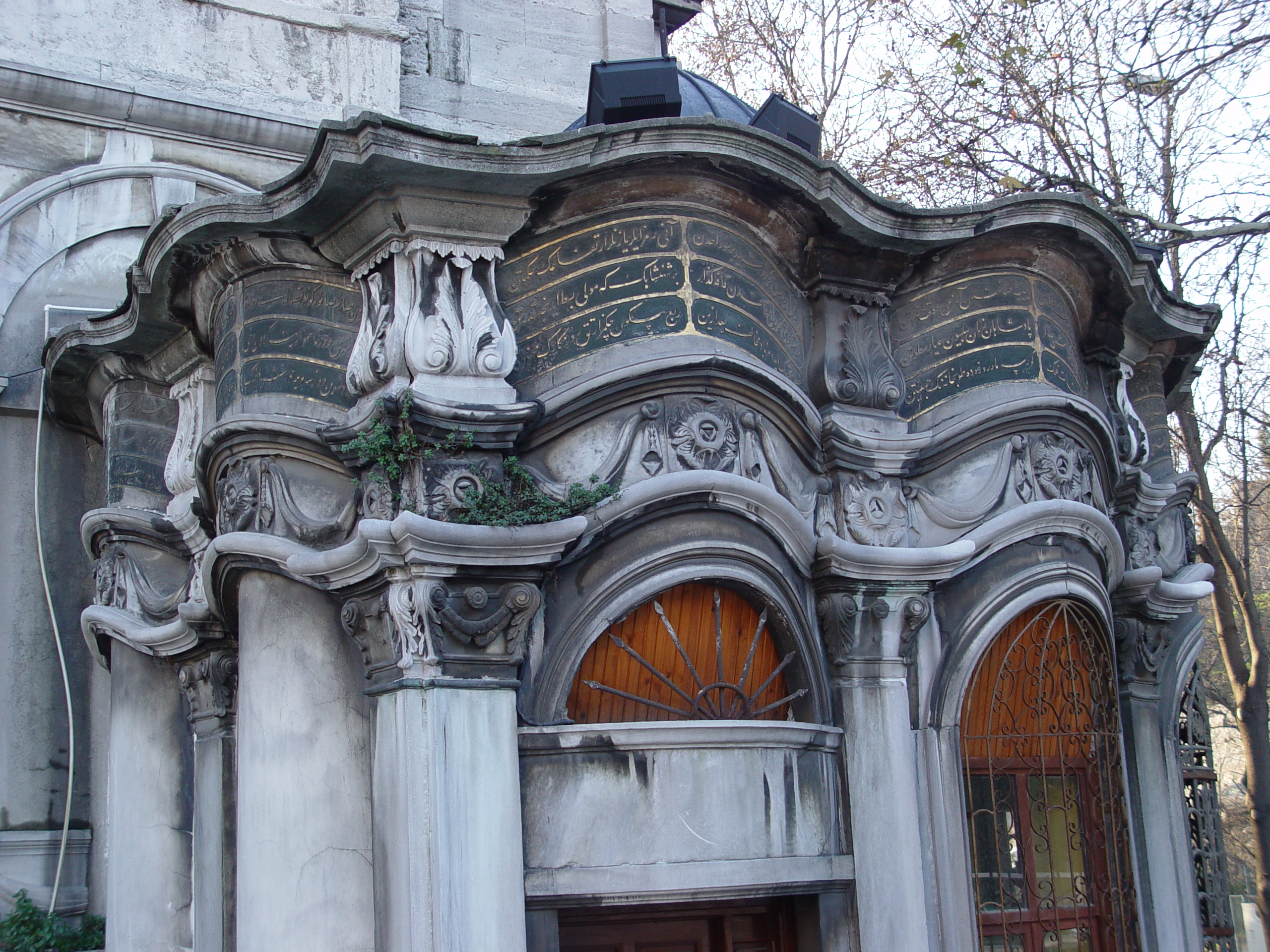
Sebil of the mosque

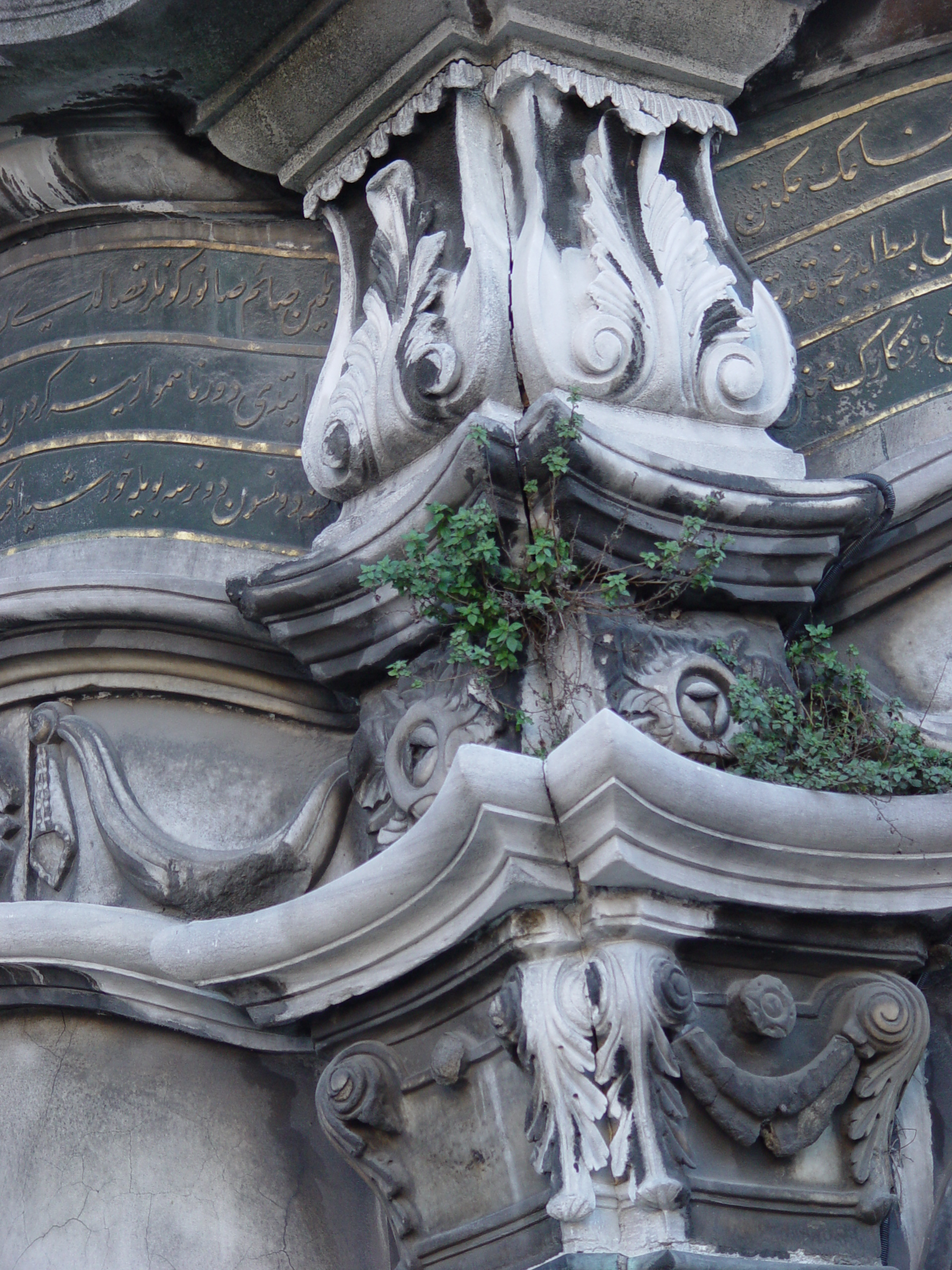
Detail of sebil

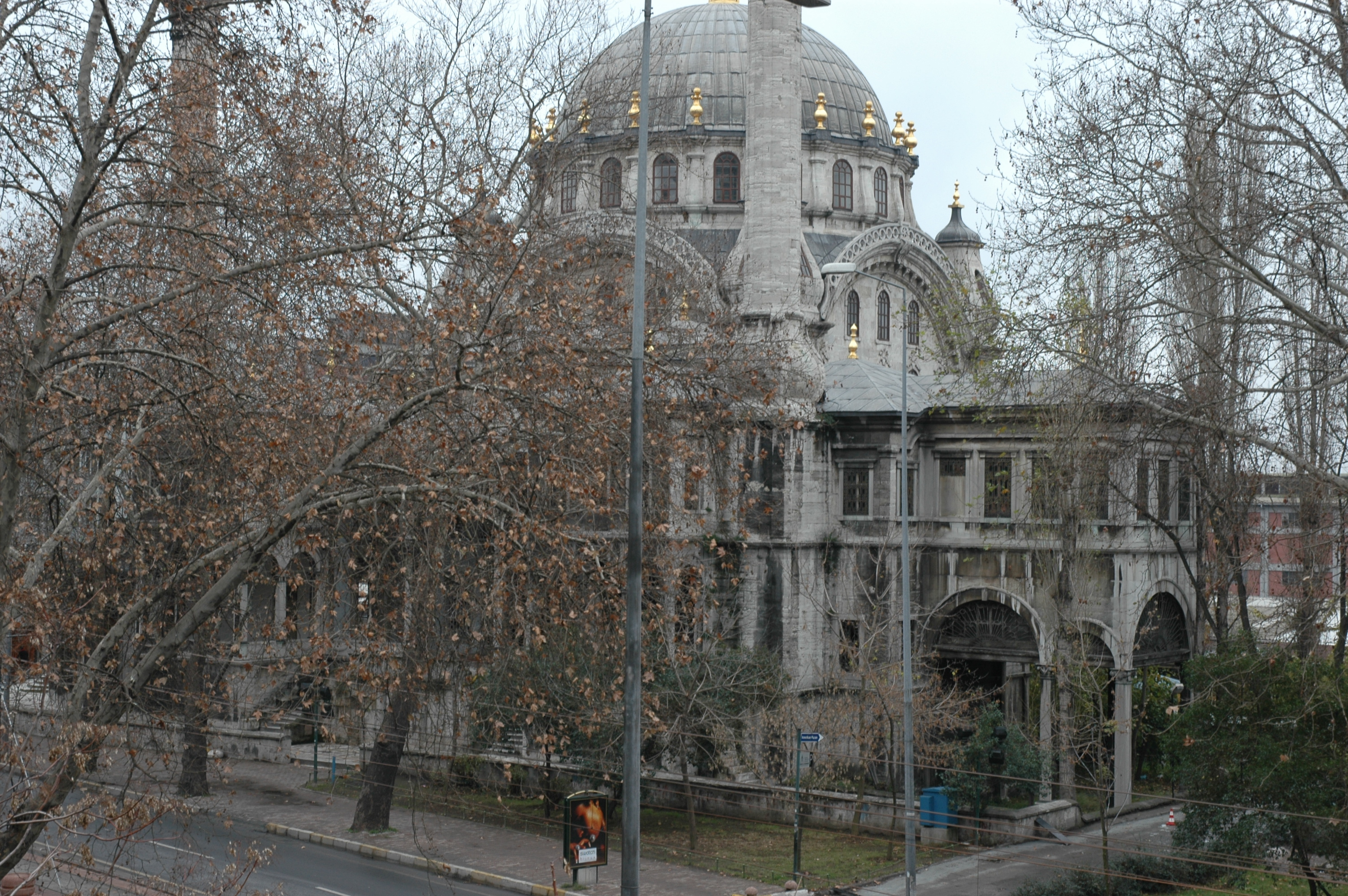
The mosque seen from Tophane (from the main street)

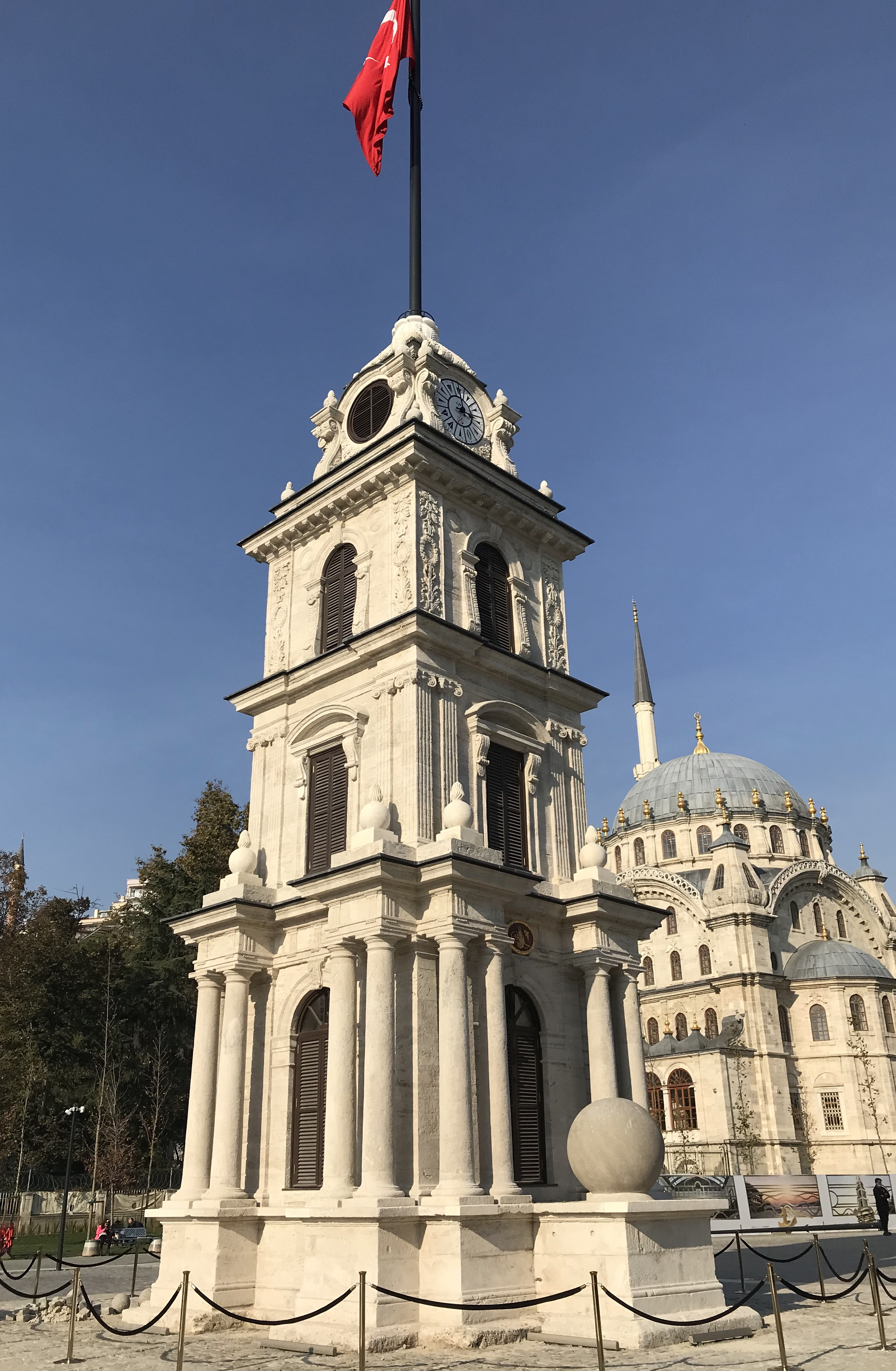
Tophane Clock Tower

== See also ==
- List of mosques
- Ottoman architecture
- Tophane Fountain
