= Güzel İstanbul =

Sculpture by Gürdal Duyar

- Oh Beautiful Istanbul
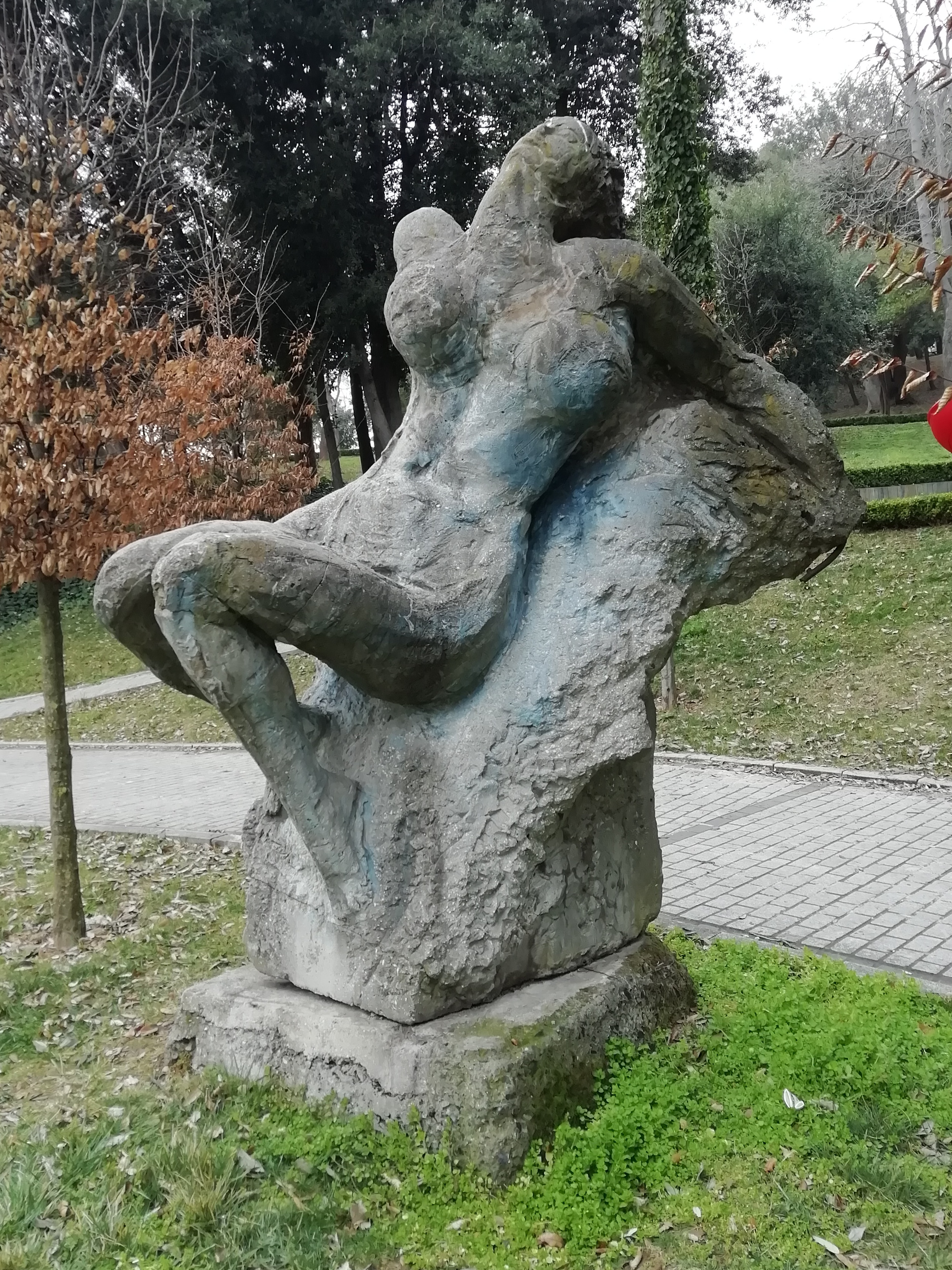
- Güzel İstanbul in the Yıldız Park (c.2020)
- Artist: Gürdal Duyar
- Year: 1974
- Medium: poured concrete
- Dimensions: 4.8 m × 1.7 m × 1.5 m (190 in × 67 in × 59 in)
- Weight: 7,000 kilograms (15,000 lb)
- Condition: damaged, parts missing
- Location: Karaköy Square, Istanbul (formerly); Yıldız Park, Istanbul

Güzel İstanbul (Beautiful Istanbul) is a concrete public sculpture of a nude female figure by Gürdal Duyar that is located in Yıldız Park in Istanbul, Turkey.

The sculpture was commissioned in 1973 as one of 20 sculptures installed in Istanbul as part of an initiative by the Istanbul Municipality to celebrate the 50th anniversary of the Turkish Republic. Güzel İstanbul represents Istanbul as a nude female figure; its plinth was adorned with figurative motifs referencing the history of Istanbul.

Güzel İstanbul was originally located at Karaköy Square. Several Turkish media outlets and traditional conservative politicians considered the sculpture obscene and called for its swift removal. In March 1974, a controversy surrounding the sculpture's installation temporarily strained Turkey's governing coalition. Following nine days of intense public debate, Güzel İstanbul was removed from its plinth and toppled on 18 March. It was significantly damaged and abandoned, and remained in Karaköy Square for over a month. On 2 May, Güzel İstanbul was moved to Yıldız Park, where it was re-erected on a makeshift plinth. As of 2023, the sculpture remains in Yıldız Park; no conservation work has been undertaken to return the work to its original condition.

The original location of the sculpture, inside the triangle formed by the intersection of Bankalar Caddesi and Kemeraltı Caddesi.

== Commission ==
Güzel Istanbul in its original state in 1974 on Karaköy Square.

In 1972, the Istanbul governor's office formed a Board for the Celebration of the 50th Anniversary of the Republic, which would occur the following year. A joint initiative of the Istanbul Metropolitan Municipality, the Istanbul Fine Arts Academy and the State College of Fine and Applied Arts formed the board's Fine Arts Committee, which included Şadi Çalık, Mustafa Aslıer and Hüseyin Gezer. The committee commissioned 50 sculptures to celebrate the anniversary; they would be sculpted by 50 artists and placed in several public spaces in Istanbul, including parks and squares.

Due to insufficient funding, the number of sculptures was reduced to 20 and the Board introduced more stringent qualifications to eliminate 30 artists; the sculptor had to be living in Istanbul and either have received a state award or have had established their personality in the arts sphere. In addition to Duyar, selected artists included Kuzgun Acar, Tamer Başoğlu, Zerrin Bölükbaşı, Ali Teoman Germaner, Yavuz Görey, Zühtü Müritoğlu, Füsun Onur, Kamil Sonad, Nusret Suman and Seyhun Topuz.

The committee did not provide stylistic or thematic guidelines, opting for diversity and suggesting each artist submit a work in their idiosyncratic style to represent the diversity of contemporaneous Turkish sculpture. The sculptors were told the placement of their proposed sculpture would be not be predetermined; but would be installed in a park, a square, or on a roadside. The design proposals were to be submitted to the State Art and Sculpture Museum on 20 August 1973.

Gürdal Duyar submitted the sketches for his proposal; a nude which he named Güzel Istanbul ("Beautiful Istanbul"). His proposal was approved during a meeting of the board that was attended by provincial and municipal representatives. The board selected his proposal to be placed in Karaköy Square. The design and the nudity were not considered an issue at any point in the process.

The sculpture has alternatively been called Ah Güzel İstanbul ("Oh Beautiful Istanbul)".

== Design ==
Duyar's concept was to create an allegory of Istanbul through a nude female figure whose arms would be bound by a chain, representing the defensive chain constructed by the Byzantine Empire to close off the Golden Horn from the Ottoman fleet in 1453. Duyar's portrayal of a woman attempting to break the chains was intended to represent the Ottoman conquest of Constantinople, which was later renamed Istanbul. Duyar said he had identified Istanbul, his home city, with the natural beauty of the female body.

In Duyar's final design, the female figure leans slightly backwards with her arms wrapped behind her, and her head is inclined backwards as she looks at the sky. The hands are shackled with a chain, which is not visible from the front. The upper part of the sculpture rests on a plinth that is decorated with reliefs depicting pomegranates, figs, honeysuckle and a bee. According to Duyar, the pomegranates in the relief represent Istanbul's many legends; figs its divinity; honeysuckle its air; and the bee its population density, dynamism and abundance. In addition to its historical and political symbolism, Duyar's work has also been interpreted as a universal representation of the emancipation of women. The sculpture, when first installed, was 4.8 metres (15.7 ft) high and used 7,000 kilograms (15,000 lb) of poured concrete.

== Erection and removal ==
On 10 March 1974, Güzel İstanbul was erected in Karaköy Square, Istanbul, a crowded and open space near the northern end of the Galata Bridge. It garnered particular attention that led to a campaign against it. Ahu Antmen said this was due to its placement in a crowded open space while Onat Kutlar said this was due to the sensuality or realism present in Duyar's sculptures, including Güzel İstanbul.

=== Güzel İstanbul Affair ===
Other nude sculptures had previously been installed in public areas of Istanbul, (Note: An example is Kâmil Sonads nude sculpture which was erected in Gülhane Park earlier under the same initiative.) and around this time there were numerous nude sculptures on display in İstanbul State Art and Sculpture Museum. None of these had been found indecent or objectionable or caused any controversy. It has been suggested the officials involved Duyar's commission had not anticipated the sculpture's nakedness would cause controversy. The installation of Duyar's sculpture was met with an immediate backlash and calls for its removal by politicians due to its perceived indecency, particularly by members of the National Salvation Party, traditional conservatives who were part of the recently formed coalition government. The ensuing controversy and public debate, which was precipitated by major media outlets and fueled by prominent Turkish political figures, is referred to as the Güzel İstanbul Affair (Güzel İstanbul Olayı). (Note: In his 1984 book, Republic Era Turkish Sculpture, Hüseyin Gezer refers to the Güzel İstanbul affair.)

An anti-Güzel İstanbul campaign occurred in the media; for 10 days, the press described the sculpture as indecent and erotic. The newspaper Sabah presented strong opinions; on 21 March 1974 it printed a front-page article that said the sculpture was corrupting the morals of Muslim Turks. This led to the sculpture appearing on the government's agenda; Deputy-Prime Minister Necmettin Erbakan stated it was immoral, and on 17 March suggested its removal. The Minister of the Interior, Oğuzhan Asiltürk, said the sculpture should be removed because it disgracefully represented Turkish mothers. The mayor of Istanbul Ahmet İsvan stated he disliked the sculpture because he found it tasteless, not because it was a nude. The Governor of Istanbul Namık Kemal Şentürk stated he was unable to judge the sculpture on an artistic level but that the choice of location had been wrong and thus he had the sculpture removed.

Republican intellectuals and others defended the sculpture and its right to remain, leading to an intense debate. Seyhun Topuz, a sculptor who also participated in the 50th Anniversary sculptures, said Güzel İstanbul almost ended Turkey's less-than-two-months-old governing coalition. (Note: The CHP-MSP coalition would break up later that year.) The CHP (Republican People's Party), the other party in the coalition, supported the MSP (National Salvation Party) position the sculpture is indecent to avoid political friction. In doing so, the CHP took a position that opposed its own views and ethical values. Scholar Hüseyin Gezer defended the sculpture's right to stay and stated there is a "difference between a naked woman and a nude sculpture".

=== Removal and public backlash ===
Cartoon by Erdoğan Bozok as appeared in Milliyet Sanat issue 73 (29 March 1974).

On the night of 18 March 1974, nine days after its installation, Güzel İstanbul was removed from Yıldız Park. In a midnight "sledgehammer operation", the sculpture was broken off its plinth and damaged: its arm was broken off and its plinth motifs destroyed. It was removed from the park and placed on a pile of sand near the Kumkapı municipal construction aggregate site. The front page of the newspaper Milliyet showed a photograph of people posing on top of the empty plinth on the night the sculpture was removed, as well as the rubble resulting from the plinth's destruction. An article in the newspaper Sabah stated the goal of their campaign to have the sculpture removed had been accomplished and that the paper was the voice of the people concerning the matter. This was countered by articles in the newspapers Milliyet and Cumhuriyet, which described the sculpture's right to remain as a necessity for democracy.

Some Turkish intellectuals reacted to the events. Burhan Felek criticized the removal, saying a sculpture should not be removed just because a minister does not like it, and that there is not a referendum of beliefs for every issue. Melih Cevdet Anday criticized the government for choosing what the people should and should not like. Hıfzı Veldet Velidedeoğlu stated dominance of the mentality that puts forward religious conservative traditions in the context of fine arts would regress Turkey to a desert of bigotry. Güzel İstanbul was also defended by cartoonists and caricaturists such as Erdoğan Bozok, Altan Erbulak, Nejat Uygur, Yalçın Çetin, Ferruh Doğan, and Nehar Tüblek, who published cartoons commenting on its removal. One of the cartoons represented those who would remove the sculpture as backwards and outdated, another criticized the politicization of art, and another criticized the censorious mindset; and others asked why fake issues were being fabricated in the news.

Cartoonists and artists who opposed the removal considered protesting it by covering all sculptures in Istanbul in black cloth but they cancelled their protest. The removal from Karaköy Square was seen as an infringement of freedom of expression in art; in protest, the Association of Turkish Sculptors organized an exhibition around the theme of nudity to show that the creative will of artists would not be inhibited. Many sculptors participated in the show, including Füsun Onur, who made an assemblage titled Nü (Nude).

The debate about Güzel İstanbul spread beyond Istanbul; provinces Manisa and Zonguldak offered to have Güzel İstanbul erected in their cities. Güzel İstanbul was one of 20 sculptures that were intentionally damaged or removed.

=== Charges ===
On 20 March 1974, the Istanbul Public Prosecutors Office, considering the articles published about the sculpture in newspapers as charges, opened an inquiry to decide whether the sculpture was obscene. According to a news report, if the sculpture was found to be obscene, the 50th Anniversary Committee would face prosecution under articles 426 and 576 of Turkish law. In a 2010 publication, Mustafa Aslıer, who was a member of the committee reflected on the events that led to the removal of Güzel İstanbul; he had been implicated in the statements and publications by the press and the MSP that led to the charges.

== Relocation ==
On 3 May 1974, through the quiet intervention of Bülent Ecevit, (Note: According to the judgement of Mustafa Aslıer who reflected on the events in a special meeting on 31 March 2007 as documented in (Antmen 2009, p. 374), it was the quite/unpublicized intervention of Bülent Ecevit that removed the sculpture from the Kumkapı municipal construction site and brought the sculpture to Yıldız Park) Güzel İstanbul was taken to Yıldız Park and left lying on its side underneath a tree. The move ended the heated political and public debate regarding the sculpture which had lasted almost two months, although Güzel İstanbul was left in an poor physical condition. In the subsequent months, photographs of the sculpture lying on its side in the park appeared; several newspapers published opinion pieces — including articles by Burhan Felek and Bedi Faik — describing the sculpture being left in this state and asking why the process was disrespectful to the artwork and the artist. The statue was eventually mounted onto a new makeshift plinth without the motifs, all of which had been destroyed. (Note: Its dimensions in the current state are 274 cm x 170cm x 150cm.) As of 2021, the sculpture stands in an inconspicuous corner near the park's Ortaköy entrance. According to some press accounts, it has not been well maintained; parts of its concrete are crumbling and its inner structure is exposed.

== Later events ==
Gürdal Duyar, the sculptor of Güzel Istanbul, said little about the statue's fate and did not participate in the controversy. In 1995, Turkish journalist Nebil Özgentürk asked Duyar about the repeated removals of the artist's work. Duyar said his role as the artist was limited to creation of sculptures, adding: "Our job is making sculptures; removing, breaking or changing their location is a different area of expertise".

In 2017, the Istanbul Municipality obscured the sculpture by surrounding it with a fence made of saplings following complaints from parents about its visibility from a nearby playground. After news of this censorship spread, a campaign on social media criticized the censorship and succeeded in having the saplings removed.

== See also ==
- List of public art in Istanbul
