= 50th Anniversary of the Republic Sculptures =

Group of 20 public sculptures in Istanbul

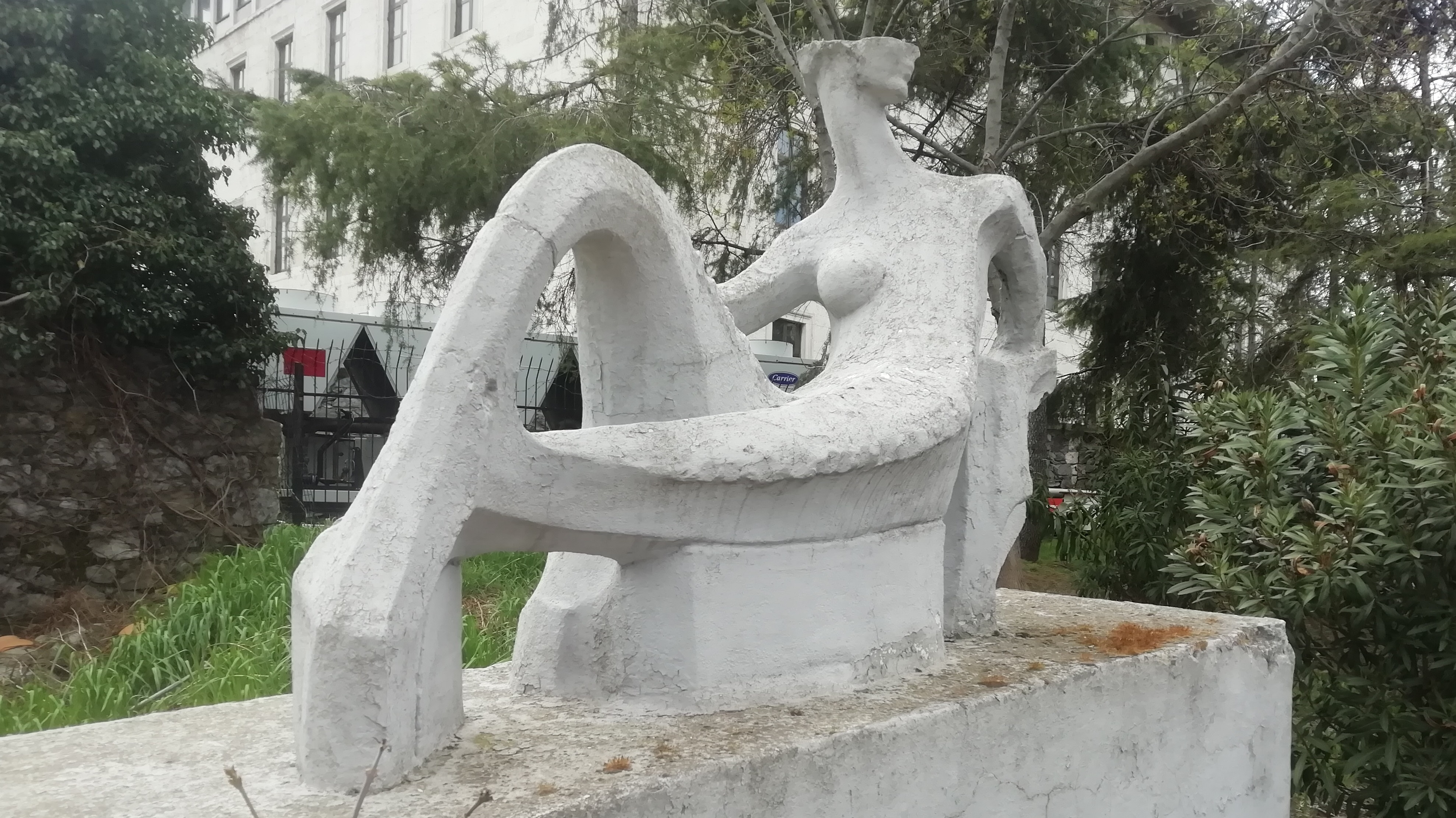
Figür by Zerrin Bölükbaşı

The 50th Anniversary of the Republic Sculptures (Turkish: Cumhuriyetin 50. Yılı Heykelleri) are 20 sculptures erected in Istanbul that were created by selected Turkish sculptors to mark the 50th anniversary of the Turkish Republic. The sculptures were erected in various parks and squares in Istanbul in around 1973. Many of them were damaged, destroyed, lost, or moved, and only a handful remain today.

It was difficult for Turkish sculptors to get their works seen in the years between 1950 and 1960; what sculptors needed was for their sculptures to be displayed in public spaces. There were very few public sculptures, other than monuments, in Turkey until 1973. In May 1972, the Committee for the 50th Anniversary of the Republic Celebrations gathered at the headquarters of the Governor of Istanbul. It initially planned to commission 50 sculptures to mark the anniversary; however, due to limited funds the number was reduced to 20. On 13 September 1973, the sketches and photographs sent by the 20 selected artists were approved by the board members of the committee. The initiative was a turning point for Turkish sculpture. For the first time, sculptors were given a chance, outside the scope of monuments, to create sculptures for predetermined locations. This allowed a shift towards modern sculpture. The result of the project was 20 sculptures erected in public spaces in Istanbul by important sculptors which reflected their original sculpting style.

Many of the sculptures were lost, damaged or removed (or both), some only a few days after they were erected. Güzel İstanbul, by Gürdal Duyar, was found by certain traditional conservatives to be "indecent"; it was removed from Karaköy Square and eventually taken to Yıldız Park. İşçi by Muzaffer Ertoran was targeted in attacks. The fate of Nusret Suman's Mimar Sinan is unknown. İkimiz by Namık Denizhan was removed due to "damage from external factors". Birlik by Mehmet Uyanık was demolished by a municipal compressor gun in 1986. Yükseliş by Bihrat Mavitran was destroyed for road construction in 1984. Yağmur by Ferit Özşen was damaged and eventually removed. Abstract sculptures which were lost include one by Füsun Onur which was removed during Bedrettin Dalan's municipal tenure in 1985, one by Seyhun Topuz which collapsed due to "natural causes" in 1984, and one by Tamer Başoğlu which disappeared in 1986, while those by Yavuz Görey and Metin Haseki were probably stolen for their bronze and copper.

== Sculptures ==
The 50th Anniversary Sculptures
Image	Name/Type	Sculptor	Location	Medium	Notes	Ref(s)
	İşçi Heykeli ('Workers Statue')	Muzaffer Ertoran	Tophane	Concrete	Attacked and damaged for years and eventually removed in 2016	
	Güzel İstanbul ('Beautiful Istanbul')	Gürdal Duyar	Karaköy Square (10–18 March 1974); Yıldız Park (3 May 1974 – present)	Concrete	Installed 10 March 1974. Removed from Karaköy and damaged in the process after public debate about its appropriateness. Later it was moved to Yıldız Parkı, where it was eventually re-erected.	
	Yağmur ('Rain')	Ferit Özşen	Arnavutköy Akıntı Burnu	Iron	Removed in 1987 when the road parallel to the beach was widened	
*A sample of Haseki's style. Not the actual sculpture.	Abstract: Negative Form	Metin Haseki	Gümüşsuyu Park, Dolmabahçe	Copper	Stolen the same day or a week after it was inaugurated	
	Abstract:Yükseliş ('Ascension')	Bihrat Mavitan	in front of the Hilton Hotel in Harbiye	Aluminium	Lost in 1979 during road construction	
	İkimiz ('The Two of Us')	Namık Denizhan	Taksim Gezi Park	Concrete	Removed following the 1980 Turkish coup d'état. It was removed by Denizhan himself after being damaged by external causes – or, according to some rumors, it was removed at the order of a colonel who was acting as the Mayor of Şişli at the time.	
	Abstract	Haluk Tezonar	Maçka	Concrete	Stands in its original location, As of 4 April 2021.	
	Abstract	Ali Teoman Germaner	Bebek Park	Copper	Stands in its original location, As of 4 March 2022.	
	Bahar ('Spring')	Hakkı Karayiğitoğlu	Emirgan Park	Concrete	First placed in front of the Istanbul Metropolitan Municipality, then removed and placed in a few different locations, the last being in front of the Yellow Kiosk in Emirgan Park where it remains today.	
	Abstract: Dayanışma ('Solidarity')	Zühtü Müridoğlu	Fındıklı Park	Concrete	Stands in its original location, As of August 2019.	
	Abstract: Yankı ('Echo')	Hüseyin Anka Özkan	Gümüşsuyu Park	Sheet metal	In 2012 the sculpture underwent conservation efforts. Stands in its original location As of April 2019.	
	Abstract	Füsun Onur	Fındıklı Park	Aluminium	Removed in 1985 during organisations of the Fındıklı Park	
	Abstract	Yavuz Görey	Taşlık Park, Beşiktaş	Bronze	May have been stolen for its material, disappearing around 1984; or it was destroyed in 1984 when struck by a lorry.	
	Birlik ('Unity')	Mehmet Uyanık	Barbaros Boulevard, Beşiktaş	Concrete	Removed in 1986 by being broken down with a compressor following a statement by the mayor of Beşiktaş calling the sculpture "unnecessary" and "meaningless".	
	Mimar Sinan (Mimar Sinan)	Nusret Suman	Saraçhane Park, Fatih	Concrete	Lost in 1980	
	Abstract	Seyhun Topuz	4. Levent	Iron	Collapsed from natural causes in 1984; some years later it was removed entirely during roadworks.	
	Figür ('Figure')	Zerrin Bölükbaşı	Orduevi Garden, Harbiye	Concrete	First erected in front of the Muhsin Ertuğrul stage and later relocated to the garden of the Harbiye Orduevi with its expansion. At some point it was moved to behind the İstanbul Radyoevi, where it stands today.	
	Abstract: Bediha Muvahhit Anısına (In Honor of Bediha Muvahhit)	Tamer Başoğlu	Yenikapı, Fatih	Iron	Stolen by scrap dealers or was otherwise removed in 1986	
	Abstract: Tavus ('Peacock')	Kuzgun Acar	Gülhane Park, Eminönü	Iron	Removed from Gülhane Park in 1984 by the Parks and Gardens Directorate	
	Çıplak ('Nude')	Kamil Sonad	Gülhane Park, Eminönü	Concrete	Removed during renovation of the park	

== Recent events ==
In 2011, seven of the sculptures were cleaned and restored as part of the "sculpture project". Hüseyin Anka Özkans' Yankı was reportedly restored to its original state. As of September 2011, it was planned to restore the Abstract in Maçka, Bahar in Emirgan Park, the Republic 50 Years Monument in Galatasaray Square, Dayanışma in Fındıklı Park, Figür in front of the Muhsin Ertuğrul Theater, and the abstract sculpture at Bebek children's park.

== Sources ==
- Antmen, Ahu (1 Apr 2009). "Türk Kültüründe Beden ve "Güzel İstanbul" Olayı". Electronic Journal of Social Sciences (in Turkish). 8 (30). Cahit Aydemir: 366–375. ISSN 1304-0278. Archived from the original on 21 March 2023.
- Ece, Özlem (July 2011). "Istanbul'da Kamusal Alanda Sanat Uygulamaları İçin Öneriler" (PDF). iksv.org (in Turkish). Istanbul: Istanbul Foundation for Culture and Arts. Archived (PDF) from the original on 13 May 2018.
- Sönmez, Begüm (2015). 1980 Lerde Kamusal Alan Heykelleri: Ankara ve İstanbul (MSc) (in Turkish). Ankara: Hacettepe University. Archived from the original on 2022-11-13.
- Şendul, Zahide (2021). Türkiye'de Kamusal Alanda Soyut Heykel Uygulamalarinin Öncüleri Olarak Cumhuriyet'in 50. Yilinda İstanbul'da Yapilmiş Heykeller (PDF) (MSc) (in Turkish). Edirne: Trakya University. Archived (PDF) from the original on 7 March 2023.
