= Hulusi (name) =

Hulusi is a masculine Turkish given name, it may refer to:

== Given name ==
- Hulusi Akar (born 1952), Turkish Army general
- Hulusi Behçet (1889–1948), Turkish dermatologist and scientist
- Hulusi Kentmen (1912–1993), Turkish actor
- Hulusi Salih Pasha (1864–1939), Ottoman grand vizier
- Hulusi Sayın (1926–1991), Turkish Gendarmerie general
- İhap Hulusi Görey (1898–1986), Turkish graphic artist
- Mehmet Hulusi Conk (1881–1950), Ottoman Army officer
- Salih Hulusi Pasha (1864–1939), Grand Viziers of the Ottoman Empire

== Surname ==
- Ahmed Hulusi, Turkish Islamic philosophical and religious author

== See also ==
- Hulusi, free reed wind instrument from China
