= Atatürk, His Mother and Women's Rights Monument =

Monument in İzmir, Turkey

- Atatürk, Annesi ve Kadın Hakları Anıtı
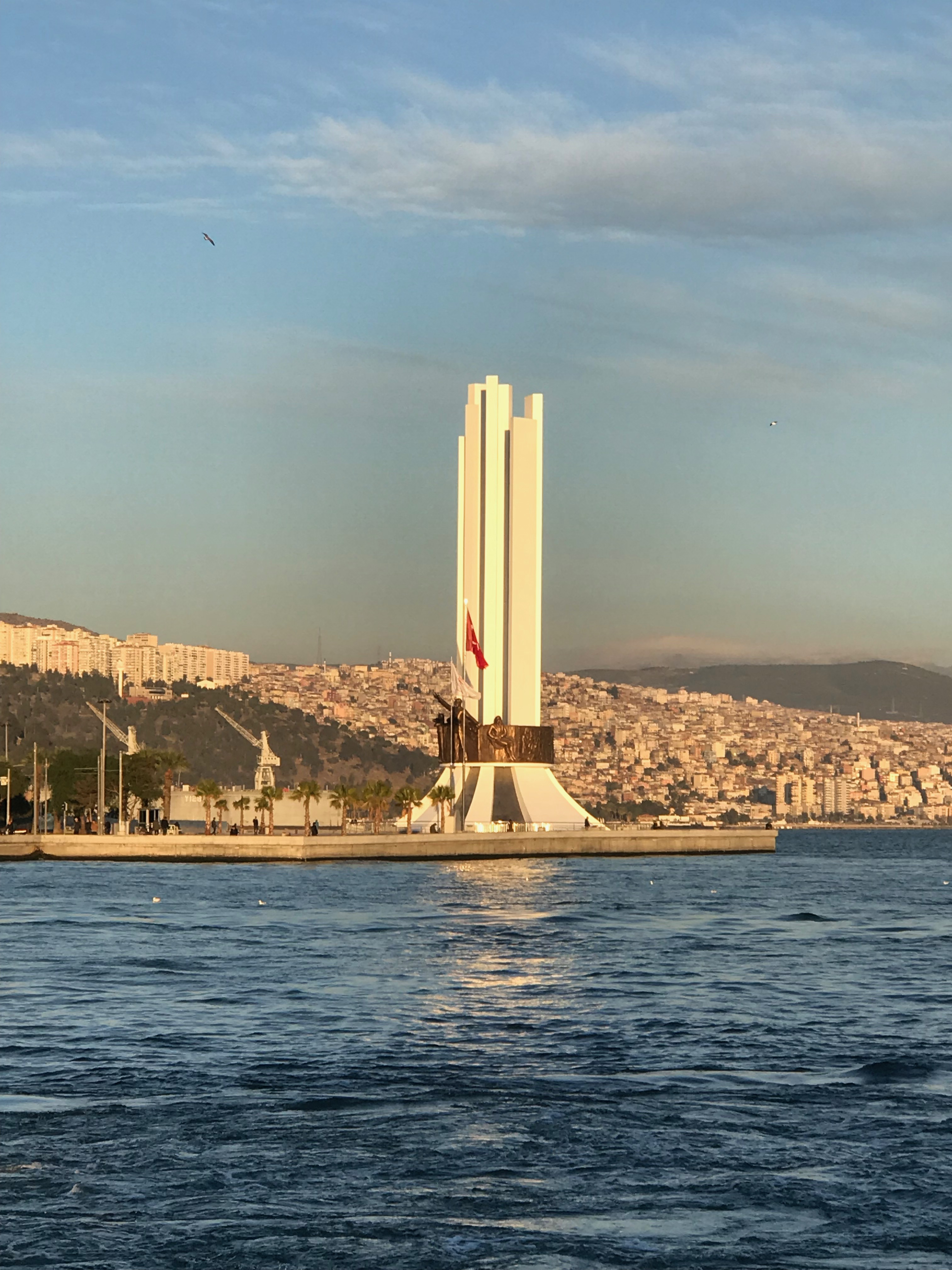
- Interactive map of Atatürk, His Mother and Women's Rights Monument
- Location: Karşıyaka, İzmir, Turkey
- Coordinates: 38°27′20″N 27°7′27″E
- Designer: Tamer Başoğlu; Erkal Güngören
- Material: Concrete; bronze
- Height: 41.7 m (137 ft)
- Beginning date: 1972
- Completion date: 1973
- Opening date: 26 October 1973
- Restored date: 2017–2018
- Dedicated to: Mustafa Kemal Atatürk; Zübeyde Hanım; Women's rights

Atatürk, His Mother and Women's Rights Monument (Turkish: Atatürk, Annesi ve Kadın Hakları Anıtı) is a monument located at Constitution Square in Karşıyaka district of İzmir, Turkey.

== History ==
A design competition was organized in May 1971 to build a monument dedicated to Mustafa Kemal Atatürk in Karşıyaka. Competition results announced on 10 November 1971 revealed that sculptor Tamer Başoğlu and architect Erkal Güngören won the contest. The monument, which was decided to be built in memory of the 50th anniversary of the proclamation of the Republic and estimated to cost 1.2 million liras, started to be built in 1972 with the donations of people of Karşıyaka and was opened on 26 October 1973 with a ceremony.

In May 2015, it was announced that the monument worn out due to negligence and corrosion will be demolished and replaced by a larger one. The Governorship of İzmir reported that the monument "poses a risk to life and property safety". İzmir No. 1 Cultural Heritage Preservation Regional Board paved the way for the renewal of the monument by stating that it is not a "historical monument". After the tender held in April 2017, a contract was signed with the contractor company for a price of 6.8 million liras. The demolition of the monument took place on 12 June 2017. The lawsuit filed for the annulment of the municipality's demolition decision was rejected by the administrative court. The monument, which was completed after a year of construction work, was opened on 12 May 2018. The Respect for Women Museum, which was created on an area of 110 m^{2} (1,200 sq ft) under the monument, was opened to visitors on 3 November 2018. The life stories of a hundred women, who had a place in the history of the republic, were included in the museum. The monument received both the European Award and the International Award at the 2018 International Property Awards in the categories of Mixed-use Development and Best Public Services Development.

== Design ==
The monument consists of seven concrete pillars that come out of the ground curvilinearly and rise upright after passing through the bronze belt. The pillars, originally planned to be six with reference to the fundamental principles of Kemalism, were brought to seven after the objection of Osman Kibar, the Mayor of İzmir of the Justice Party. The rise of the pillars symbolize the development of women's rights in Turkey. The bronze belt features the reliefs of Mustafa Kemal Atatürk, Zübeyde Hanım, and Turkish women.

While the original monument was 15.54 m (51.0 ft) tall, the bronze belt, starting from 3.8 m (12 ft) above the ground, was 1.4 m (4.6 ft) wide and 6.5 m (21 ft) in diameter. The lowest pillar of the renovated monument is 35.5 m (116 ft) and the highest one is 41.7 m (137 ft) tall, and the bronze belt, which starts from 9 m (30 ft) above the ground, is 3.5 m (11 ft) wide.
