= Delphin (Thrace) =

Town of ancient Thrace

Coordinates: 41°01′48″N 28°59′11″E

Delphin or Karandas was a town of ancient Thrace, inhabited during Roman times.

Its site is located north of Fındıklı in European Turkey.
