= Molla Çelebi Mosque =

Ottoman mosque in Beyoğlu, Istanbul, Turkey

Molla Çelebi Mosque (Molla Çelebi Camii) Fındıklı Mosque (Fındıklı Camii) The Hazelnut
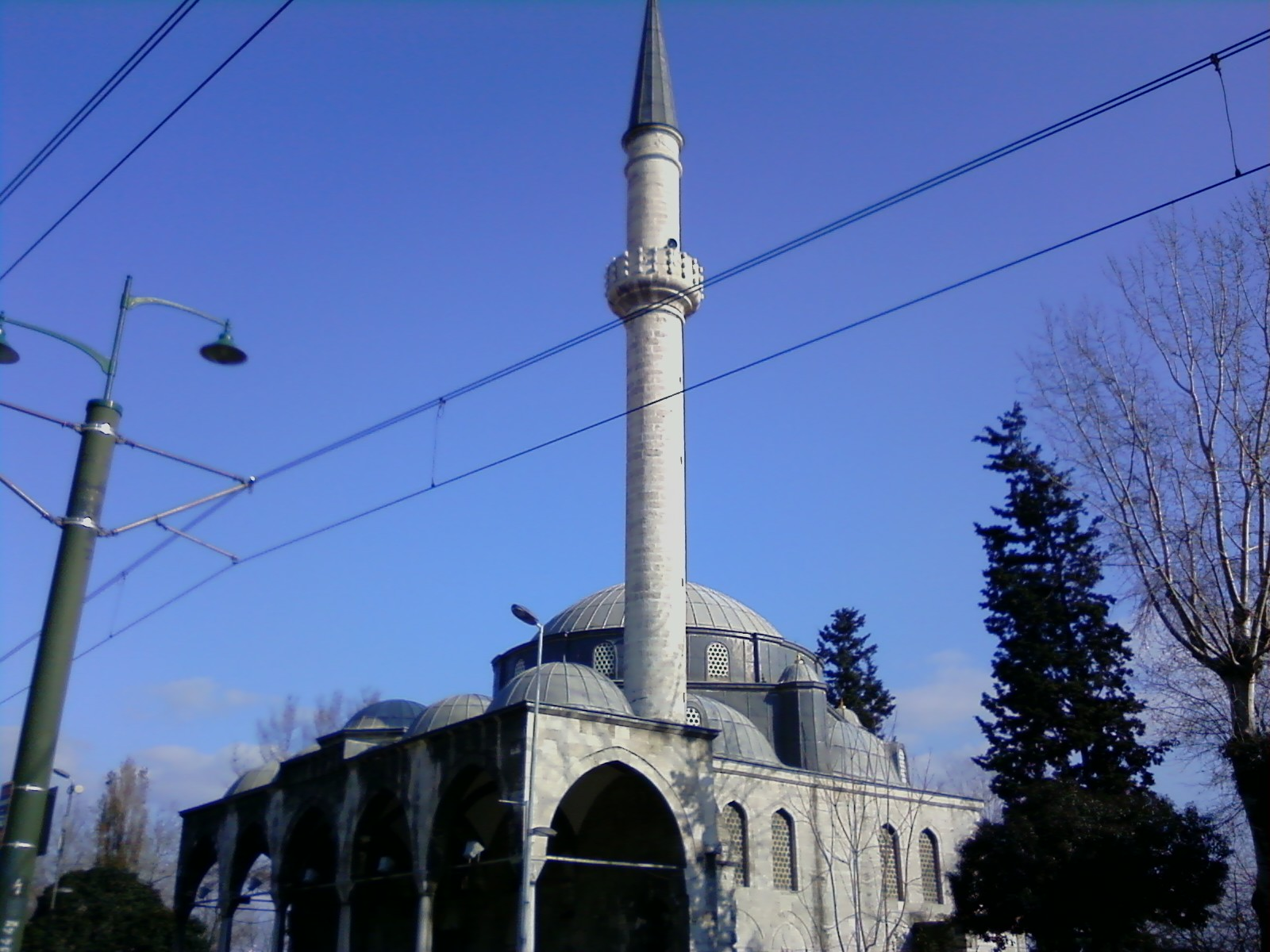

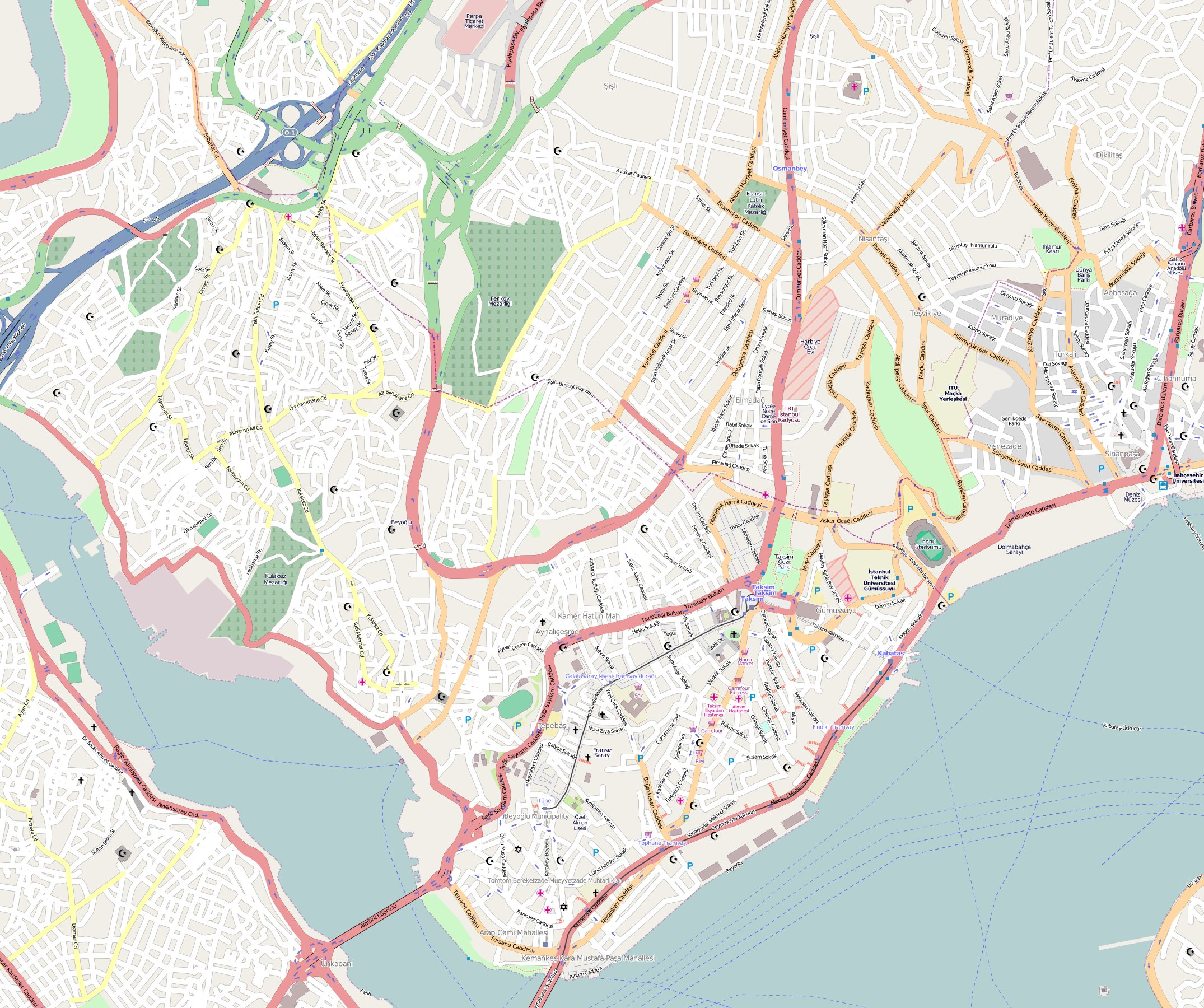
- Location within the Beyoğlu district of Istanbul

Religion
- Affiliation: Sunni Islam
- District: Beyoğlu
- Region: Turkey
- Ecclesiastical or organisational status: In use
- Leadership: Kazasker Mehmet Vusuli Efendi, Retired Chief Judge of Istanbul
- Status: Active

Location
- Location: Istanbul, Turkey
- State: Istanbul
- Coordinates: 41.0321°N 28.9906°E

Architecture
- Architect: Mimar Sinan
- Type: Mosque
- Style: Ottoman architecture
- Groundbreaking: c. 1570
- Completed: 1584

Specifications
- Dome dia. (outer): 11.8 m (39 ft)
- Minaret: 1

The Molla Çelebi Mosque (Turkish: Molla Çelebi Camii), sometimes known as the Fındıklı Mosque (Turkish: Fındıklı Camii) is a 16th-century Ottoman mosque located in the Fındıklı neighbourhood of the Beyoğlu district of Istanbul, Turkey. It was commissioned by Kazasker Mehmet Vusuli Efendi, chief judge of Istanbul and designed by the imperial architect Mimar Sinan. The mosque is located on the Bosphorus waterfront, close to the Kabataş ferry port and Dolmabahçe Mosque.

== Geography ==
The mosque is located in Istanbul in the Fındıklı district of Beyoglu county in the Meclisi Mebusan Street, on the lower shores of the European Bosphorus, at Fındıklı. The Molla-Celebi mosque, also known as “Findikli Camii” or “the Hazelnut”, as viewed from the waterside, near the Kabataş funicular and ferry stations, looks very elegant and impressive, particularly under the reflection of the evening sun over the Bosphorus Straits.

== History ==
The mosque was designed by renowned architect of Turkey, Sinan Sinan under the directive of Mehmed Vusuli Efendi, who was the lead tasker and then Chief Justice of Turkey who was also renowned as a “savant and poet”. According to the government sources, the mosque was built between 1561 and 1562. However, there is doubt about the dating sequence. Another reliable reference puts its constriction period between 1570 and 1584.

== Architecture ==
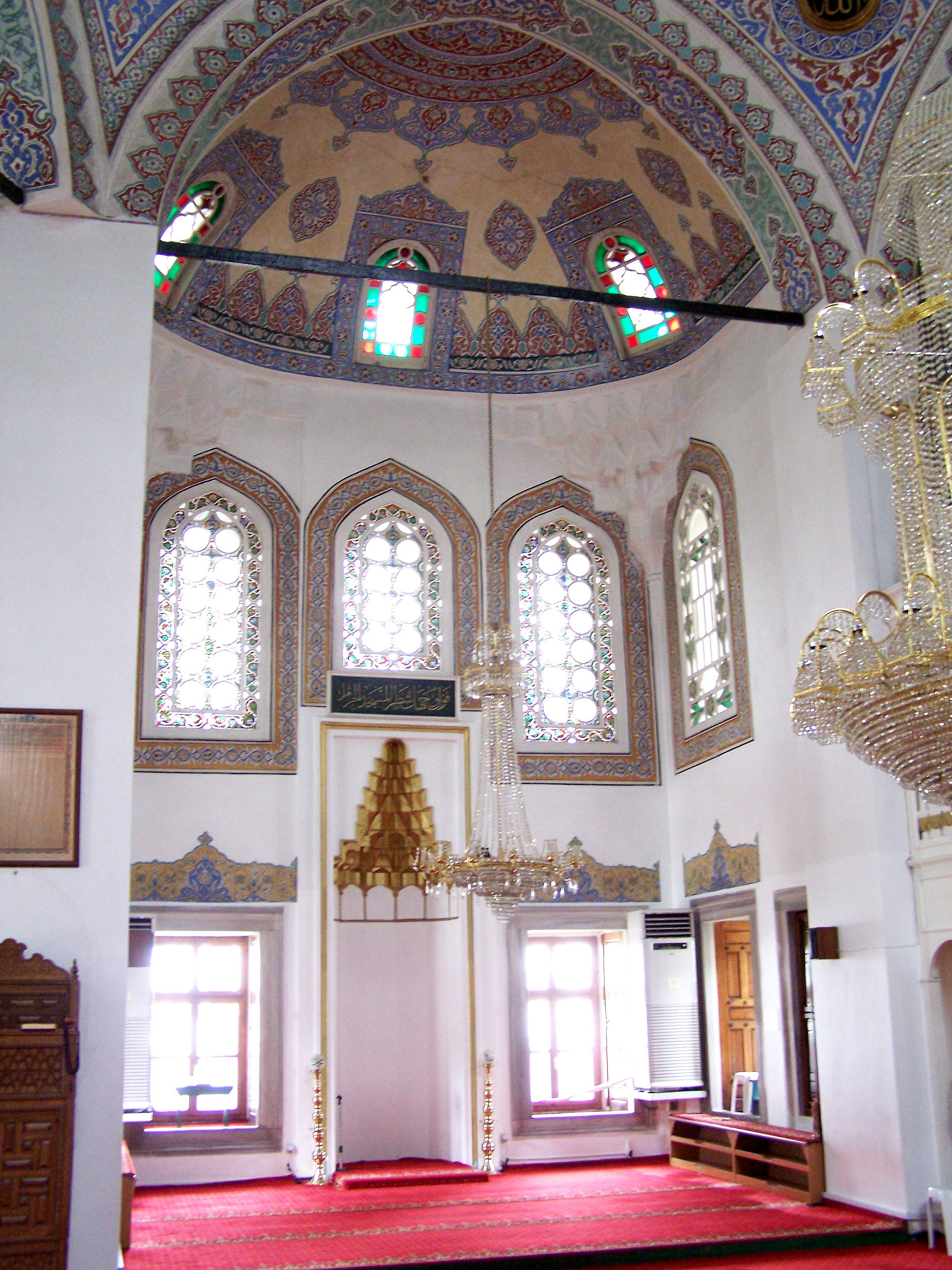
Interior

The mosque was initially built as a small complex, with a hexagonal plan designed by the architect Mimar Sinan. Principally, the mosque was built in two sections, the central prayer hall of size of 18.90 by 16.40 metres (62.0 by 53.8 feet), and the mihrab yeri (chancel) of size of 8.80 by 4.60 metres (28.9 by 15.1 feet). The pillars are built into the walls and between the pillars there are four small semicircular domes in the east–west direction and the central dome, which is the central prayer section. This section is also covered by semicircular dome of 11.8 metres (39 feet) diameter and covered with six arches built between the six embedded columns; the rectangular apse in which the mihrab is built projects out. In addition there are ten windows, placed above the lower part of the dome. The window gaps, placed in two vertical.

The mosque structure is built entirely in the Classical Ottoman Architectural tradition. The minbar or the pulpit in the mosque, is a unique special feature from where the imam addresses prayer meetings, which is embellished with kalem işi, polychrome wall paintings. The mihrab (niche) is also embellished in the same style as the minbar. There is a slim minaret built at the arcaded entrance, which has four domes. The mosque facing the street, has the minaret to its right corner. The minaret has a sherefe (minaret balcony). The extensions on the sides are covered by semi domes as it provides better continuity for both the cover system and the interior. the mihrab is for the first time is located in an apse that projects from the middle portion of the qibla wall. This interior layout design compensates for the lack of depth on the north–south axis.

== See also ==
- List of Friday mosques designed by Mimar Sinan
