= Fındıklı, Beyoğlu =

Quarter of Istanbul, Turkey

Coordinates: 41°2′N 28°59′E

Fındıklı
- Quarter
- Interactive map of Fındıklı
- Country: Turkey
- Region: Marmara
- Province: Istanbul
- District: Beyoğlu
- Time zone: UTC+3 (TRT)
- Area code: 0212

Fındıklı is the northernmost neighbourhood of the Beyoğlu district of Istanbul, Turkey, on the European coast of the Bosphorus. Tophane is to the south and Kabataş to the north. Towards the water it is a mainly business and hotel district although it becomes residential in the streets running uphill towards Gümüşsuyu. Fındıklı is served by the T1 tram service.

Along the waterfront, the quarter is home to the Mimar Sinan Fine Arts University, which is housed in what were once the Twin Palaces (Çifte Saraylar) of Münire Sultan and Cemile Sultan, the daughters of Sultan Abdülmecid. The small Fındıklı Park beside it contains sculptures created by the students of the university. The Twin Palaces briefly housed the Ottoman Parliament (Meclis-i Mebusan)

The waterfront Molla Çelebi Mosque was designed by the Ottoman architect Mimar Sinan in 1561-62. It was once part of a complex with a dervish lodge (tekke) and hamam but these were both lost to the widening of the Meclis-i Mebusan coast road.

The imposing free-standing Hekimoğlu Ali Paşa Fountain stands at the point where Fındıklı merges with neighbouring Kabataş. It was built in 1732 for Hekimoğlu Ali Paşa who served as grand vizier twice and originally stood on higher ground on the inland side of the road before being moved when the coast road was widened.
