= Kamil Sonad =

Turkish sculptor

- Born: 1914; Istanbul, Turkey
- Occupation: Sculptor

Kamil Sonad (1914, year of death unknown) was a Turkish sculptor.

Sonad was born in Istanbul in 1914, a student of Rudolf Belling. After graduating in 1948, he worked as a teacher.

His early work began with classical nudes, aiming to represent the modern woman of the Republic of Turkey. Much of his early work was in plaster.

For the 50th anniversary of the Turkish Republic, 20 statues were installed in Istanbul; one of these was created by Sonad.
