= Zerrin Bölükbaşı =

Turkish sculptor (1919–2010)

Zerrin Bölükbaşı (1919–2010) was a Turkish sculptor. She was of the first Turkish female sculptors, and the first woman sculptor to work on abstract sculptures.

== Life ==
=== Early life ===
Zerrin Bölükbaşı was born as Zerrin Ark to İhsan and Nevzat Hanım in Bakırköy, Istanbul, then in the Ottoman Empire in 1919. Her mother Nevzat was an educated woman, who graduated from the German school and her father İhsan Ark worked in real estate business. In 1926, she entered the Bakırköy Primary School, and after she finished the school, the family moved to Kadıköy in Istanbul. There, she continued her schooling in Kadıköy American High School.

=== At the Academy ===
Celal Esat Arseven, who was in a close relation to her recommended her to attend the State Fine Arts Academy, and she officially registered there in 1938 to the Sculpture department. From 1937 to 1941 she worked at the academy sculpture department in the studio of Rudolf Belling. She was a student in the sculpture Department at the same time as Sadi Çalık, İlhan Koman, Hüseyin Gezer, Yavuz Görey and Rahmi Artemis. Together with Belling, they are some of the most important figures in establishing modern Turkish sculpture.

Starting in 1941, she taught Art History at the academy two consecutive academic years. She graduated from the first part of the academy, and did not do the second part because of this. Although she graduated, she continued to work in the painting and sculpture classes at the academy and continued her work.

=== Marriage ===
In 1944, she married Nazif Bölükbaşı, the son of poet and writer Rıza Tevfik Bölükbaşı. Bölükbaşı was the executive assistant of the Governor of Istanbul. In 1948, they had a son, Ahmet. Bölükbaşıs job required him to travel often and because of this, Zerrin often had opportunities to travel as well.

=== Beyoğlu City Gallery ===
Likely starting around 1954, she took on the management of the Beyoğlu City Gallery for nine years. She held her first personal exhibition at this gallery in 1956.

== Works ==
In 1958, her sculpture, "Dansöz", won the second place award in an international competition attended by 27 nations in Paris, France. In 1963, her sculpture, "Arab Head" won a fourth place award in Berlin, Germany. In 1969, she won the second place award of the State Painting and Sculpture Exhibition in Ankara.

== Exhibitions ==
Some of her exhibitions include:

- 1956 Beyoğlu City Gallery, Istanbul
- 1961 2nd Contemporary International Sculpture exhibition, Musée Rodin, Paris
- 1986 Ankara Tanbay Art Gallery
- 1990 Destek Art Gallery, Istanbul
