= Seyhun Topuz =

Turkish sculptor (born 1942)

- Born: 1942 (age 83–84); Balıkesir, Turkey
- Education: State Fine Arts Academy
- Known for: Sculpture
- Style: Abstract, geometric
- Awards: Aydın Doğan Foundation Sculpture Award, 2008
- Website: seyhuntopuz.com

Seyhun Topuz (born 1942) is a Turkish sculptor who works in a geometric abstract narrative.

== Life and works ==
Topuz was born in 1942 in Balikesir and attended Law School. When her second academic year started she stopped with Law School and started to study for the Art School exams. She was accepted to the State Fine Arts Academy, MSGSÜ, and graduated from its Higher Sculpture Department. Between 1974 and 1978 she worked as an assistant in that same department. In the 1970's she opened her first personal exhibition. In 1973 Topuz was one of the 20 artists chosen to make works in commemoration of the 50th anniversary of the Turkish Republic and her artwork stayed at 4. Levent for a limited time. In 1977 she completed the degree of academic qualification with thesis in her field on (Turkish: "heykelde ışık ve saydamlık") "light and transparency in sculpture" Between 1978 and 1980 and also 1983 to 1984 she continued her sculpture career in New York City. Between the years 1978–1980 she worked together with Art Students League sculptor Jose De Cleft. In 1987 she participated in the Istanbul Biennial. In 1990 the Ankara Art Foundation Turkish: Ankara Sanat Kurumu awarded her the Sculptor of the Year Turkish: Yılın Heykel Sanatçısı award. In 1999 she opened a personal exhibition in Istanbul. One year later her works went on exhibit in the Ayşe and Ercümend Kalmık Museum (Turkish: Ayşe ve Ercümend Kalmık Müzesi). Her later exhibitions took place at the Istanbul Maçka Art Gallery and Galeri Nev in Ankara. In 2006 she celebrated 35 years in art. Around those years her works were exhibited as part of the exhibition named "Memory and Scale: 15 Artists of Modern Turkish Sculpture" (Turkish: "Bellek ve Ölçek: Modern Türk Heykelinin 15 Sanatçısı”) at Istanbul Modern. In 2008 she was awarded the Aydın Doğan Foundation Sculpture Award. While she received the award she said: "I'm happy, a woman artist and sculptor is receiving an award".

In her art career Topuz worked much on square, circle and triangle formed abstract-geometric iron creations. Besides iron she also tried out materials such as timber, stone and plexiglass. In some of his works she made reference to Russian Constructivists and Naum Gabo's search for global forms. In the 1990s her works with iron masses shaped in such a way that sharp edges would form by cutting and folding different polygonal forms were approaching a more minimalist style. Some of her floor sculptures consist of black iron plates. In her wall sculptures she preferred fiberglass over iron. Especially in recent times she worked with "broken rectangles" affected by circular movements. Her floor sculptures generally conformin to gravity with a downwards motion, however some in contrast reach up.
