= Fındıklı Park =

Park in Istanbul, Turkey

- Fındıklı Parkı
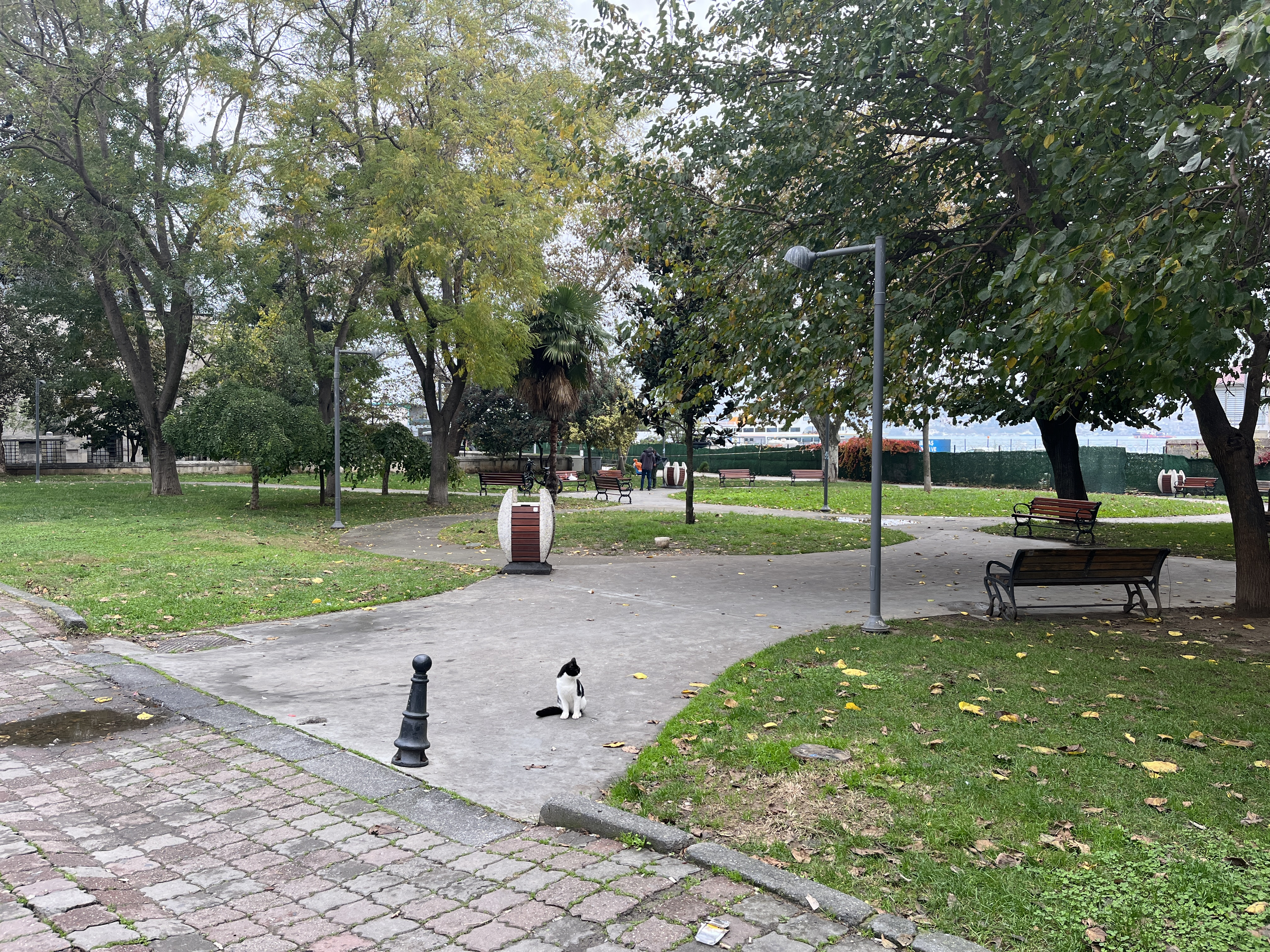
- The park in 2023
- Interactive map of Fındıklı Park
- Location: Beyoğlu, Istanbul, Turkey
- Coordinates: 41°01′52″N 28°59′24″E

Fındıklı Park (Turkish: Fındıklı Parkı) is a park in Beyoğlu, Istanbul, Turkey.

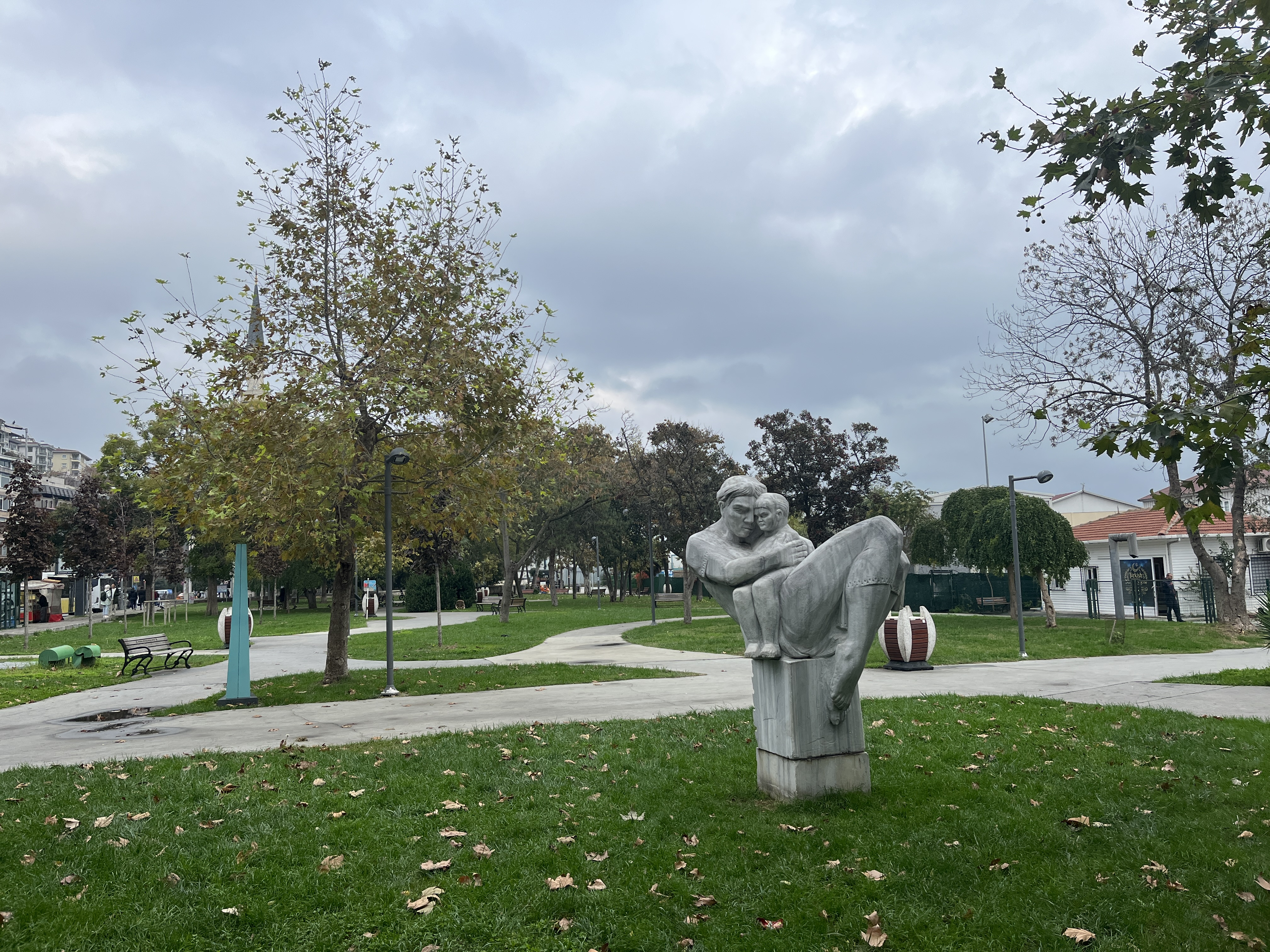
Dayanışma ('Solidarity') by Zühtü Müridoğlu

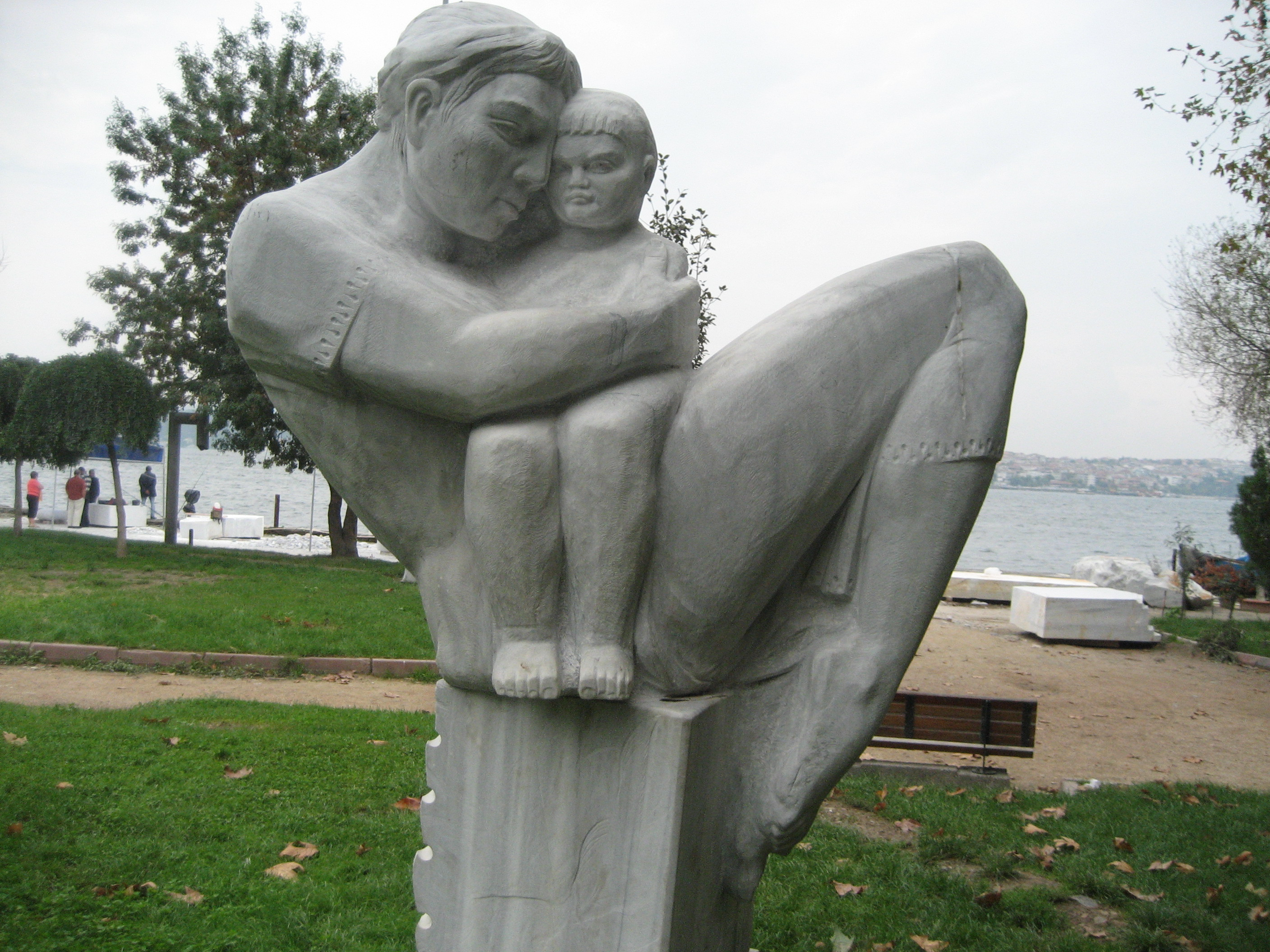
Dayanışma

== See also ==
- 50th Anniversary of the Republic Sculptures
