= Kuzgun Acar =

Afro-Turk sculptor

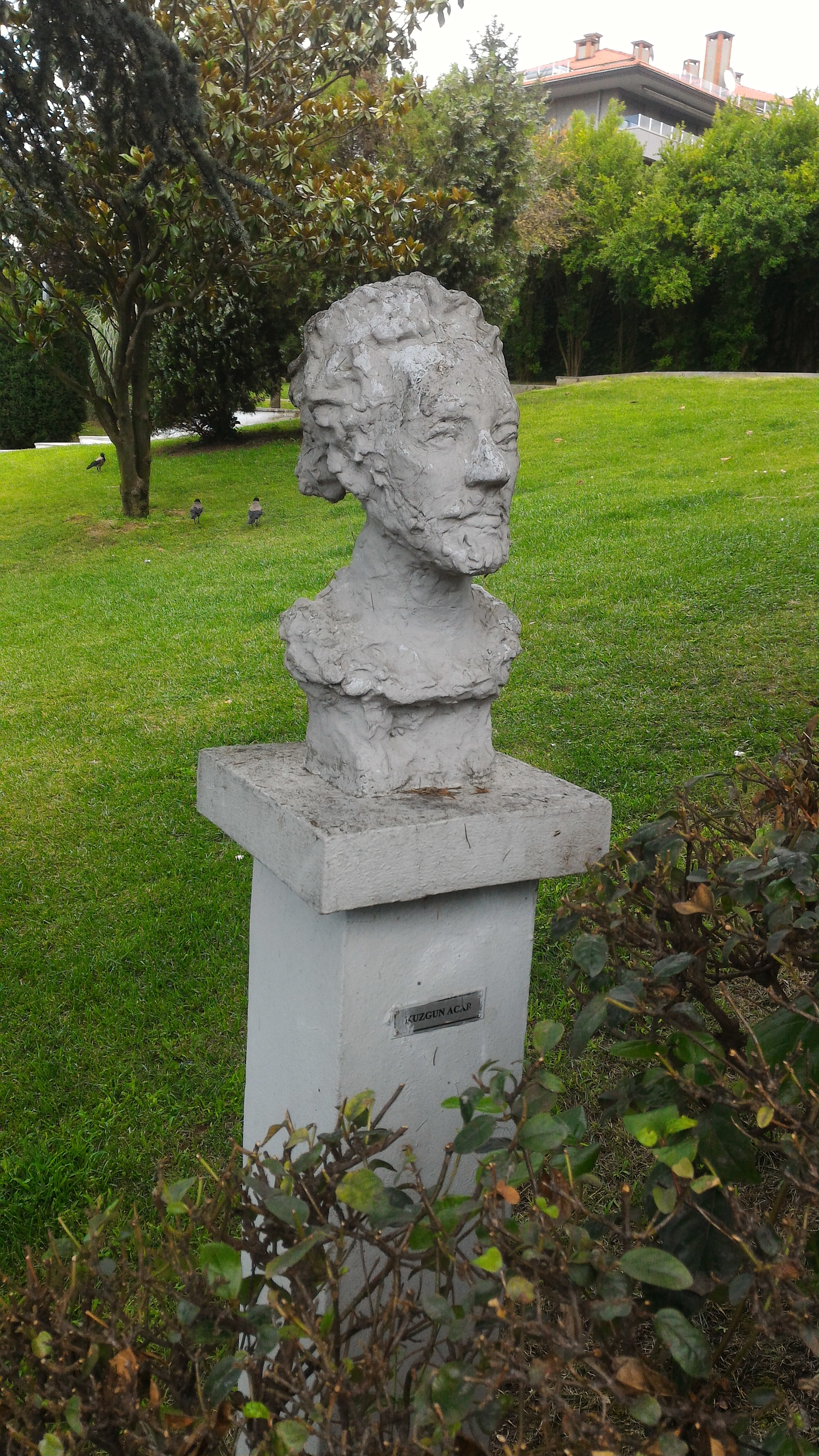
- Bust of Kuzgun Acar by Gürdal Duyar, at the Akat Artists' Park (Akat Sanatçılar Parkı) in Beşiktaş, Istanbul
- Born: Abdülahet Kuzgun Çetin Acar; 28 February 1928; Istanbul, Turkey
- Died: 4 February 1976 (aged 47); Istanbul, Turkey
- Resting place: Zincirlikuyu Cemetery
- Known for: Sculpture
- Notable work: Kuşlar (1967)

Abdülahet Kuzgun Çetin Acar (28 February 1928 – 4 February 1976) was an Afro-Turk sculptor well known for his works in metal. He is best known for his abstract sculptures and is considered one of the pioneers of modern sculptures in Turkey. One of his famous sculptures is Kuşlar ("The Birds"), which he created in 1967.

== Private life ==
Kuzgun Acar was born in Istanbul to Nazmi Acar and his wife Ayşe Zehra, who was a sub-Saharan African woman of either West or Central African origin, arriving from a Libyan port, or from Ethiopian origin . Although his father Nazmi Acar was a well-to-do businessman he initially refused Kuzgun, perhaps because of his dark skin color (the forename Kuzgun involves a pun; it means "Raven" in Turkish and seems to make reference to the saying “The raven sees her young as a falcon”). Kuzgun and his mother (who soon afterwards divorced her father) lived in poverty during his childhood and youth. He graduated from high school at İstanbul Sultanahmet Ticaret Lisesi. In 1948 entered the sculpture department of the Academy of Fine Arts (now Mimar Sinan Fine Arts University). He became a student of Rudolf Belling (1886–1972). In his academy years, influenced by Hadi Bara (1906–1971), he developed an abstract style. In 1953 he graduated from the academy. He married Münire Abdusef in 1955. After divorcing, in 1965 he got married for a second time to Bige Berker, who bore him a son named Yunus in 1966. He married for a third time in 1971 to Fersa Pulhan.

Acar died on 4 February 1976, aged 47, from intracerebral hemorrhage, following his fall from a ladder while he was working on a wall relief. He is buried at the Zincirlikuyu Cemetery.

== Career ==
He worked with wire mesh, making sculptures reminiscent of Naum Gabo (1890–1977). He taught painting at Istanbul Atatürk High School and painting-sculpturing at the high school he finished. He displayed his sculpture works in wire at a personal exhibition in the American news Center in 1957. Between 1958 and 1960, he experimented making various forms with wire, nails, metal bars and scrap by gas welding. He performed experiments in enameling.

His work, created with nails, was awarded the first prize at the Biennale de Paris in 1961. This award became a turning point for him, because he won one of the two scholarships allocated to foreign young artists by the Paris Biennale. Acar went to Paris on the scholarship and worked there for one year. His work was displayed at the Musee d'Art in 1962. His work and his designs were acquired by the museum.

After returning to Turkey, he won the first prize with his iron sculpture at the 23rd State Painting and Sculpture Exhibition in 1962. He took part at the Museum of modern art in Le Havre and Galerie Lacloche in Paris with his private exhibitions in 1962 and 1963. His next exhibitions were for his paintings at the Deutsches Kulturzentrum in Istanbul, and for his sculptures at the Musée Rodin in Paris in 1966.

In 1966, he created his well-known public works Kuşlar ("The Birds") in Istanbul and Türkiye ("Turkey") in Ankara.

In 1968, he produced masks for street theater company of Mehmet Ulusoy. In 1975, he accompanied the Turkish theater company to Paris and created the masks for the play The Caucasian Chalk Circle. The 140 masks made of steel and rubber used in World War II are among his important works.

== Politics ==
After Acar joined the socialist Workers Party of Turkey in the 1960s, his works did not find buyers, so he had to earn a living as a fisherman and barkeeper. He accompanied the street theater Devrim İçin Hareket ("Movement for Revolution"), which played at squares, strikes and protest rallies in 1968. He joined a group of foreign mountaineers to Eastern Anatolia for the shooting of a documentary movie promoted by the daily Milliyet's campaign "Boğaz'a Değil Zap Suyu'na Köprü" ("A Bridge to the River Zap, not to the Bosphorus"). In 1972, he was detained by the military regime of 1971.

== Works ==
Kuşlar (1967)

Acar's metal sculpture Kuşlar ("The Birds") was selected to be displayed on the front facade of the İMÇ İstanbul Manifaturacılar Çarşısı (Istanbul Manufacturers Bazaar), located on Atatürk Boulevard between the Valens Aqueduct and the Unkapanı neighbourhood. After hanging there for some time, the sculpture was damaged due to exposure to the elements, and was taken down to be restored. When it was taken down, it was noticed that the damage was more severe than initially thought. The very extensive restoration efforts led by Asst. Prof. Özer Aktimur took three years. It was on display, for the first time in a museum environment, until 23 October 2016 and then was returned to its original place at the "İMÇ" building.

Masks

Acar made 140 masks for the Kafkas Tebeşir Dairesi.

Türkiye (1966)

Some of Acar's works at public places caused controversy, and were removed and put in storage. His large-scale metal sculpture crafted in 1966 and titled "Türkiye", which stood in front of the Emek Business Center in Kızılay, Ankara, and depicted the lost lands in Anatolia due to becoming arid, was removed later, put in a storage and was subsequently sold for scrapping. Crafted in 1974, his 13 m-high (43 ft) metal relief composition made of automobile parts and scrap iron, which was placed on a wall at the social facilities of "Maden-İş Sendikası" ("Miners Union") in Gönen and depicted a worker, his family and employer, was removed after the 1980 military coup and put in storage. In 1997, as it was remembered, it was taken out from storage and was put in its original place. Crafted in 1975, his giant sculpture in the form of a hand in honor of former governor of Antalya Haşim İşcan was removed some time later and put in storage. It was then erected at Karaalioglu Park in Antalya.

== Tribute ==
On 28 February 2021 Google celebrated his 93rd birthday with a Google Doodle.
