= Yavuz Görey =

Turkish sculptor (1912–1995)

- Born: 27 August 1912; Geneva, Switzerland
- Died: 1995 (aged 82–83); Istanbul, Turkey
- Known for: Sculpture

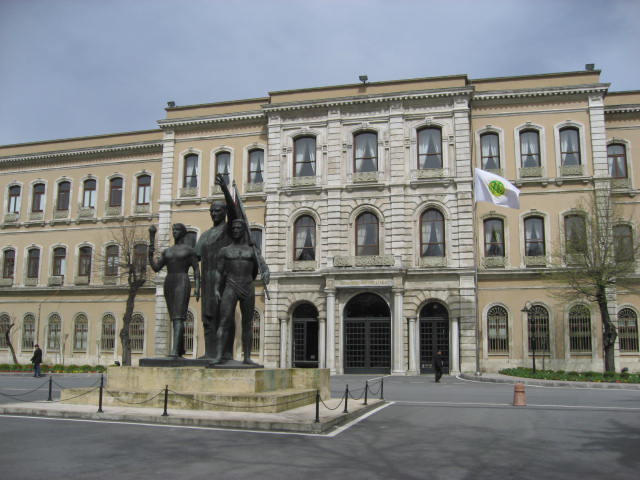
Atatürk and the Youth Monument by Yavuz Görey in front of the Istanbul University Rectorate

Yavuz Görey (27 August 1912 – 1995) was a Turkish sculptor.

== Life ==
Yavuz Görey was born in Geneva, Switzerland on 27 August 1912. He is the brother of graphic artist İhap Hulusi Görey (1898–1986).

After attending the primary and middle school at Lycée Saint-Joseph, Istanbul and Galatasaray High School, he graduated in 1929. He studied mathematics at University of Liège. He took painting lessons at the Antwerp Fine Arts Academy in Belgium. He completed his higher education at the Istanbul Fine Arts Academy, where he was a student in Namık İsmail's studio for a year, in 1940. He became an instructor at the Architecture Faculty of Istanbul Technical University. He died in 1995 in Istanbul.

== Career ==
He worked with an abstract understanding and became known for his figurative busts and sculptures. He was influenced by German sculptor Rudolf Belling (1886–1972) while working with him at the Istanbul Fine Arts Academy. He was one of the sculptors, who was invited by the Municipality of Istanbul to create a sculpture(s) to be put in the parks and squares of the city to celebrate the 50th anniversary of the Republic.

He died in Istanbul.

=== Works ===
- Atatürk head at Istanbul Painting and Sculpture Museum
- Kavalalı Mehmet Ali Paşa statue (1944)
- İranian Prince Eşref bust
- Samsun central bank reliefs (1949)
- Istanbul University, Atatürk and the Youth Monument (1953)
- King Faisal II bust in Iraq
- Erfelek Atatürk monument
- Çınarcık Atatürk monument
- Rize Atatürk monument
- Devrek Atatürk monument (1962)
- Aksaray/Niğde Atatürk sculpture (1965)
- Bartın Atatürk sculpture (1968)
- Dumlupınar Great Atatürk monument (1973)
- Burdur monument (1976)
