= Karaköy Square =

Area in Karaköy, Istanbul, Turkey

- Square
- Karaköy Meydanı
- Location: Karaköy, Istanbul, Turkey
- Location within Istanbul
- Coordinates (Center of the square): 41.022628°N 28.974944°E

Karaköy Square is an area in Karaköy at the north end of the Galata Bridge on the northern bank of the Golden Horn. It is between the opposing directions of the Kemeraltı Street which temporarily splits at Karaköy Square. The metro stop on a part of the square is called Karaköy Station.

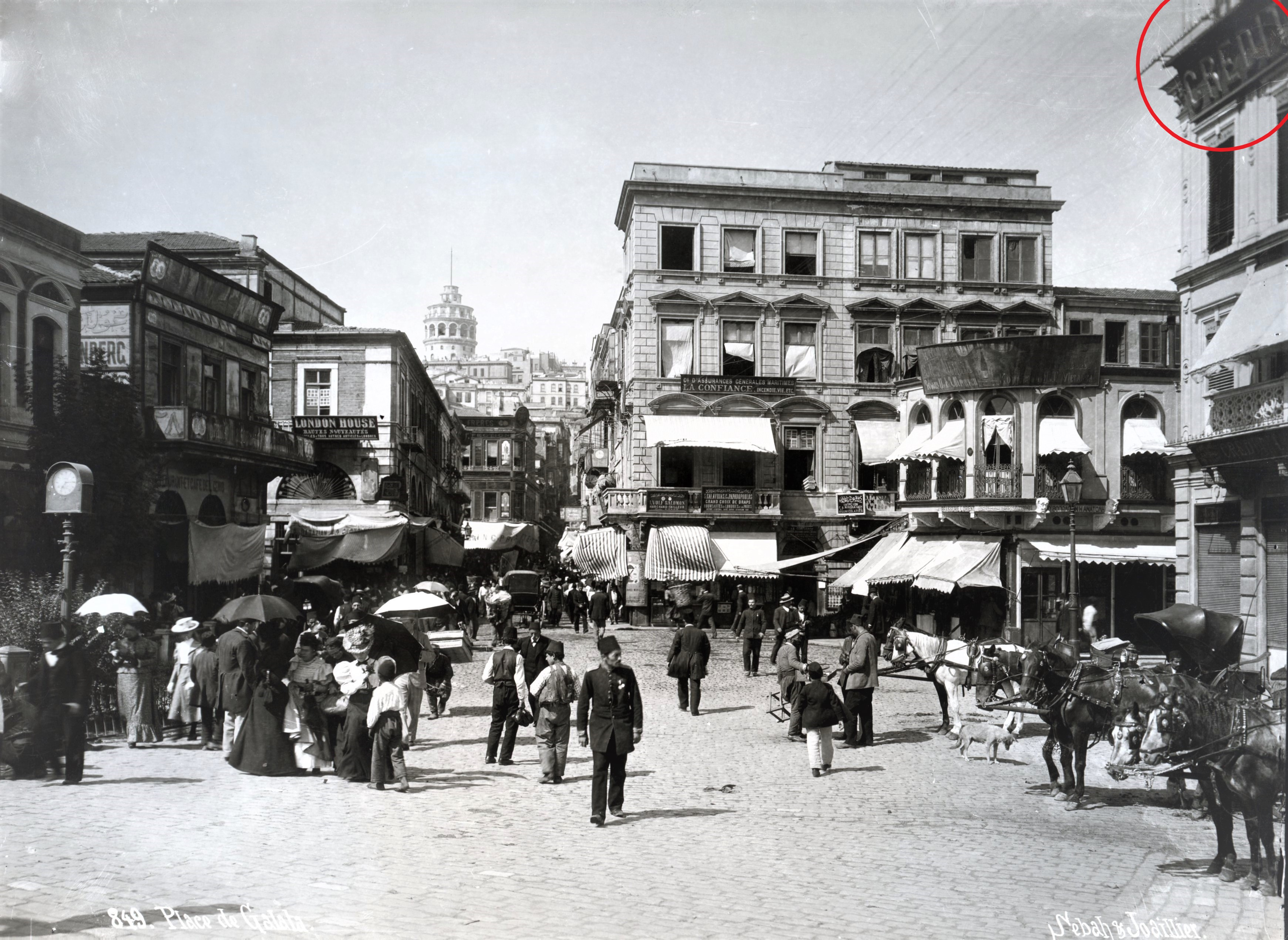
The Square at the end of the 1800s

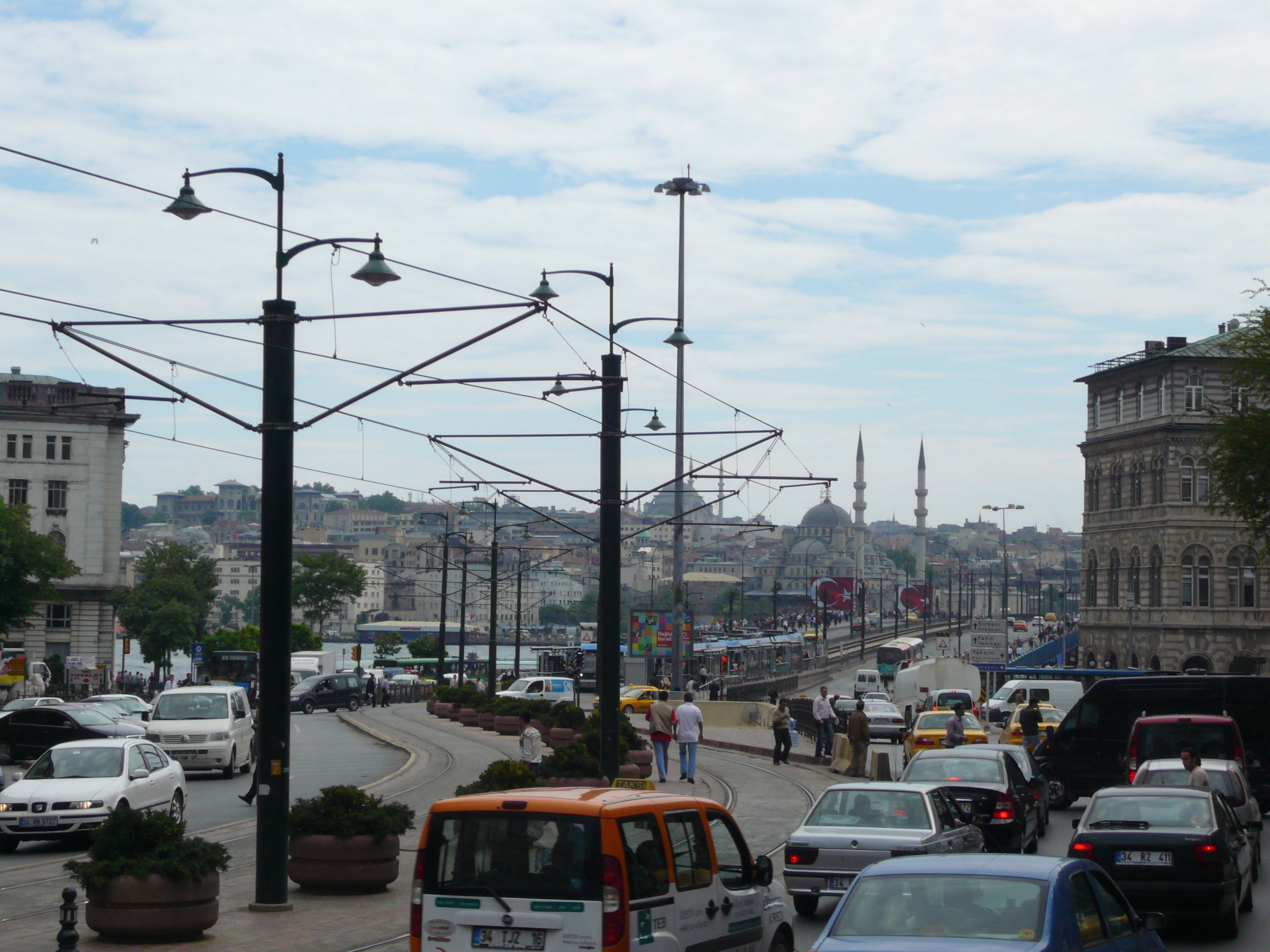
From the square looking towards the Galata Bridge

== Sources ==
- "Yüzyıllık Hikayeler | Karaköy Meydanı". www.yuzyillikhikayeler.com.
- ".KARAKÖY MEYDANI" (in Turkish).
