= Füsun Onur =

Turkish artist (born 1938)

Füsun Onur (born 1938) is a Turkish artist, based in Istanbul. She uses everyday materials in her painting and sculpture to reflect on space, time, rhythm and form.

== Early life and education ==
Onur was born in Kuzguncuk, Istanbul. She attended the Department of Sculpture at the Istanbul Academy of Fine Arts, where she was a student of Ali Hadi Bara. Rewarded a Fulbright scholarship, she continued her master's degree in sculpture at Maryland College of Art, Department of Sculpture where she graduates in 1967.

== Works ==
Onur's early works come in the form of abstract geometric sculptures. However, starting from 1971 she used found objects and light, transparent or reflective materials to create rhythmic compositions that examine space and time. Having lived and worked in the same house on the Bosphorus where she was born, her childhood memories and objects (clothes, toys, furniture, photographs) as well as found objects collected from its vicinity are materials she often rearranges in her works.

In response to a series of open air exhibitions in Istanbul, such as in the gardens of the Museum of Archeology (1976 and 1977) and Dolmabahce Palace (1977), her work developed towards site-specificity and gradually embraced the installation form. Expanding the boundaries of both sculpture and painting, works such as Floral Counterpoint (1982) and Third Dimension in Painting (1982) create immersive spatial experiences. In parallel, her interest in the language of musical composition took center stage starting from Cadence (1995) and Prelude (2001) in Istanbul's Maçka Sanat Galerisi, and became a prominent feature of some of her works in the 2000s such as Opus II - Fantasia (2001, Kunsthalle Baden-Baden).

== Exhibitions ==
Her work has been shown in solo and group exhibitions at Maçka Sanat Galerisi (1987, 1991, 1995, 2000, 2012), Istanbul Modern (2011), Augarten Contemporary, Vienna (2010), Van Abbemuseum, Eindhoven (2005), ZKM, Karlsruhe (2004), Lunds Konsthal (2003), and the Kunsthalle Baden-Baden (2001). She has participated in documenta (13), the Istanbul Biennial (2011, 1999, 1995, 1987), the Moscow Biennale (2007) and an unofficial collateral exhibition for the 58th Venice Biennale (2019).

ARTER in Istanbul hosted her first comprehensive survey exhibition entitled Through the Looking Glass in 2014. Curated by ARTER's Exhibitions Director Emre Baykal, the exhibition brought together more than forty works, ranging from early abstract geometric drawings to installations that employ daily objects such as toys, textiles, and furniture.

Onur was selected to represent Turkey at the 59th Venice Biennial in 2022 with an exhibition titled Once upon a time.... The exhibition was accompanied by a comprehensive eponymous monograph covering her entire career with commissioned essays by 26 leading figures from the international art world, co-published by Istanbul's IKSV, Yapi Kredi Yayinlari and Mousse publishing.

== Writings ==
Onur often accompanied her exhibitions with artistic statements addressing the public directly rather than relying on critics' views. In a 1987 artist talk at Maçka Sanat Galerisi, she said, “The artwork ends with the explanation of the artist.” According to Beral Madra, rather than imposing a meaning, this was intended as an invitation for the viewer to engage freely with the works to arrive at their own interpretations and narratives. The artist also wrote texts on exhibitions at Taksim Art Gallery. In her writing on a 1976 artwork by Cengiz Çekil, Onur also criticizes critics for their "irresponsible, effortless, arbitrary habit of appreciation or lack thereof."

== Collections and documentation ==
Onur's work has been part of public collections, including Tate Modern in London, MAK in Vienna, and Van Abbemuseum, among others.

In a conversation with curator Özge Ersoy, collector Agah Uğur states that Musical Chair, a 1976 work by Onur is the pivotal work for his collection. Emblematic of the artist's intention to challenge traditional sculpting materials in the 1970s, the work consists of a wooden box with a tiny red chair on top. Uğur says that the work's exhibition history is crucial, as the work was rejected from the State Art and Sculpture Exhibition in 1976, with an Academy painting department tutor calling it “a child’s toy.”

In a conversation with curators Carolyn Christov-Bakargiev and Hans Ulrich Obrist, published in conjunction with documenta (13), Onur states, “I forget, İlhan [her sister] remembers and asks.” Onur's sister Ilhan plays a major role in the preservation of her artworks, "If Ilhan was not involved, there would not even be the photographs. There would be nothing."
