= Ahu Antmen =

Turkish writer, translator, academic and columnist (born 1971)

Ahu Antmen Akiska (born 1971 in Mersin) is a Turkish writer, translator, academic and columnist.

== Biography ==
She got her degree between the years 1989-1994 at İstanbul Üniversitesi Faculty of Communications. Between the years 1994-1995, she completed her master's degree at the University of London Goldsmiths College Department of Cultural Studies. She achieved her doctorate between the years 2002-2005 at the Mimar Sinan Fine Arts University -Faculty of Arts and Sciences at the Art History Department. She works as a professor at the Marmara University Fine Arts Faculty; She gives lectures on 20th Century Art, Art Criticism and Theory, Contemporary Art Practice and Contemporary Turkish Art. At the same time she is also on duty as a professor at the Sabancı University Art and Social Sciences Faculty. Antmen conducts research on issues such as; representations of cultural transitions, transformations and translations; use of the body as a sociopsychological tool in performance; gender inequality in art history; self, identity and gender issues in modern and contemporary art and has organized exhibitions on these issues.

== Works ==
=== Books ===
- Aloş 1957 - 2007 Retrospektif/ Zamanların Belleği - Ali Teoman Germaner'in Yaşamı ve Sanatı (2007)
- Aloşname: Bir Heykeltıraşın Felsefe Taşı (2016)
- Kimlikli Bedenler (2017)
- Sanat/Cinsiyet Sanat Tarihi Ve Feminist Eleştiri (2020)
- 20. Yüzyıl Batı Sanatında Akımlar (2019)

=== Translations ===
- Ağırbaşlı İki Hanımefendi (1996), Jane Bowles
- Aşk Üzerine (2020), Alain De Botton
- Beyaz Küpün İçinde (2019), Brian O'doherty
- Dali (2005), Gilles Neret
- Gauguin (2005), İngo F. Walther
- Görmek ve Fark Etmek (2018), Alain De Botton
- İngiliz Casus (2020), Michael Ondaatje
- Kimsenin Konuşmadığı Dil (2002), Eugene Mirabelli
- Pablo Picasso/ Yüzyılın Dahisi (2005), İngo F. Walther
- Soluk Alma Dersleri (1993), Anne Tyler

=== Compilations ===
- İçerdeki Yabancı - Hale Tenger (2007), Yapı Kredi Publications
- Türkiye Sanat Yıllığı 2001 (2002), Yapı Kredi Publications
