= İhap Hulusi Görey =

Turkish graphic artist

İhap Hulusi Görey (November 28, 1898, in Cairo – March 27, 1986, in Istanbul), was the first international Turkish graphic artist best known for his illustrations on posters and labels of several Turkish brands in the Republican era.

== Early life ==
Ihap Hulusi's father was a well-known architect in Cairo and he wanted his son become a successful diplomat. For this Ihap Hulusi was sent to English schools in Cairo. However, his primary interest was in painting. In the meantime, he took lessons in painting by mail from Germany. In 1920, after graduating from the high school, Ihap Hulusi went to Munich, Germany, and studied painting for five years specializing in illustrations.

Following his return, İhap Hulusi's father enrolled him to the Ministry of Foreign Affairs in Istanbul against his will. So Ihap Hulusi dropped off after a while and devoted himself to commercial graphic art.

== Career ==
Ihap Hulusi's first work was the illustration for a toothpaste advertisement poster. In 1929 he established his first workshop in Istanbul and designed 1930 the famous bottle label for the Turkish liquor Raki brand "Kulüp Rakısı". This artwork on the bottle label is still in use today.

With the Latin alphabet reform in 1928, Atatürk commissioned him in 1934 to make illustrations in order to promote the adoption of the new Turkish alphabet. The graphic artwork showed Atatürk teaching the new Turkish alphabet to a little girl, Atatürk's adoptive daughter Ülkü.

His first private exhibition was held in 1935 in Istanbul. Several exhibitions followed at home and abroad. Ihap Hulusi Görey's work became well-known and he performed illustrations for state and private companies until 1977. He worked without interruption for 45 years designing the tickets for the Turkish State lottery, which came out three times a month. He designed the bottle labels of various products of the Turkish State Monopoly 35 years long. He illustrated also posters for the famous brands like the British whisky John Haig, Italian Cinzano and Fernet Branca.

Görey designed also logos for some companies, which helped them get easily recognized and well known. In his late life he was much involved in performing calligraphy.

He was called the "man who illustrated the Republic" or the "king of the graphic art". Ihap Hulusi Görey died on March 27, 1986, in Istanbul. He was survived by his fourth wife Naşide after 27 years of marriage.

Ender Merter, a Turkish advertisement businessman, who collects the works of Ihap Hulusi Görey since 1993, exhibited in 2002 Görey's original drawings, aquarelles, calligraphies and personal belongings in the Rahmi M Koç Museum.
