= Tamer Başoğlu =

Turkish sculptor

Tamer Başoğlu (born 1938) is a Turkish sculptor.

== Early life and education ==
He was born in 1938 in Nazilli. In 1960, he graduated from the Sculpture Department of the Istanbul State Fine Arts Academy. With a state scholarship, he continued his studies in Italy. In 1964, he returned to the academy as an assistant. In 1968, he participated in the Salzburg Summer Academy, working with Kirschner and Emilio Vedova.

== Career ==
In 1970, he earned the title of associate professor, and in 1976, he was promoted to professor. In 1983, he was appointed as the Head of the Department of Sculpture at Mimar Sinan Fine Arts University, a position he held until 1990. He then served as the Dean of the Faculty of Fine Arts from 1990 to 1994. Between 1994 and 2000, he was the Rector of the university.

Following his tenure as Rector, he served as the President of the Council of Fine Arts Branches in Universities under the Council of Higher Education.

In 2012, he joined Işık University as a full-time professor in the Department of Industrial Product Design at the Faculty of Fine Arts.

== Awards ==
He received a total of 20 awards. Among these, he regarded the bronze medal at the Alexandria Biennale and the Grand Prize in the Sculpture Division of İş Bank.
