= Rudolf Belling =

German sculptor (1886–1972)

- Rudolf Belling
- Born: 26 August 1886; Berlin, German Empire
- Died: 9 June 1972 (aged 85); Munich, West Germany
- Known for: sculpture
- Movement: Expressionism, Abstract art

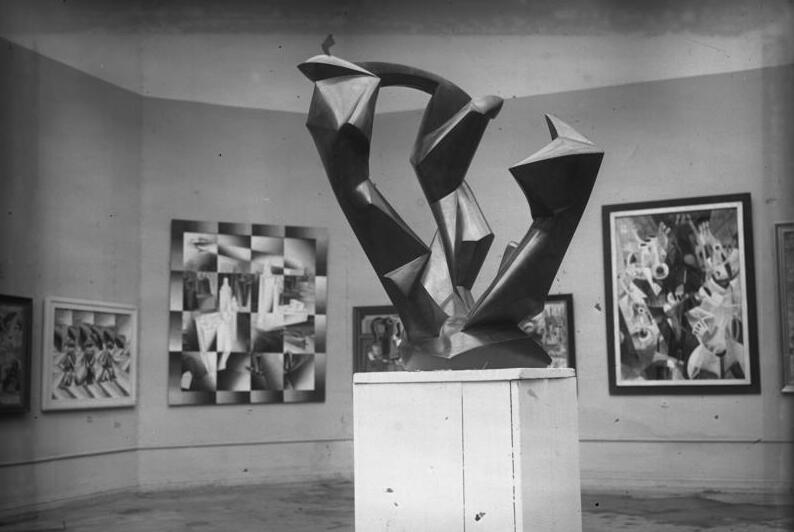
Rudolf Belling's sculpture "Dreiklang" (triad) on display in Berlin, 1929

Rudolf Belling (26 August 1886 - 9 June 1972) was a German sculptor. His work was part of the sculpture event in the art competition at the 1932 Summer Olympics.

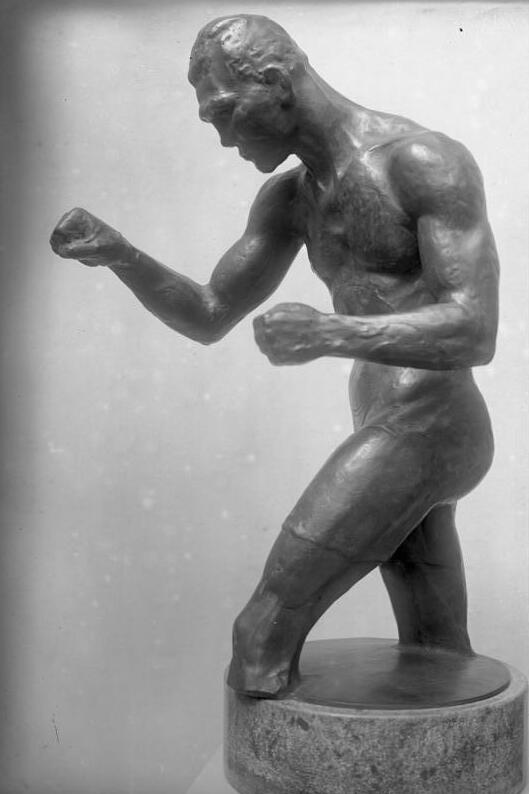
Max Schmeling by Belling, (photo 1931)

== Artistic theories ==
At the very beginning of the 20th century Rudolf Belling's name was something like a battlecry. The composer of the "Dreiklang" (triad) evoked frequent and hefty discussions. He was the first, who took up again thoughts of the famous Italian sculptor Benvenuto Cellini (1500–1570), who, at his time, stated, that a sculpture should show several good views. These were the current assumptions at the turn of the century. However they foreshadow an indication of sculpture being three-dimensional.

Rudolf Belling amplified: a sculpture should show only good views. And so he became an opponent to one of the German head scientists of art in Berlin, Adolf von Hildebrandt, who, in his book, The problem of Form in Sculpture (1903) said: "Sculpture should be comprehensible – and should never force the observer to go round it". Rudolf Belling disproved the current theories with his works.

His theories of space and form convinced even critics like Carl Einstein and Paul Westheim, and influenced generations of sculptors after him. It is just this point which isn't evident enough today.

== Departure from Germany ==
From 1933 on, Belling had no chance to work in his home country. His works were marked as degenerate art, many of them were melted down or smashed. As his political opinions were also not in conformity with the Nazi regime, he was banned from working as well as from his membership of the Prussian Academy of Arts, Berlin. The academy president advised him in the name of the Prussian Minister of Education and Arts to resign.

In 1935, Rudolf Belling stayed for eight months in New York City, where he had an exhibition in the Weyhe Gallery with his most important works from the Modern Classic Period. He also gave courses of lectures on modern sculpture and his own theories. America offered him the possibility to live his life there.

He returned to Germany because his nine-year-old son Thomas was in danger there since his mother, Rudolf Belling's first wife, had been Jewish. He succeeded in saving his son and emigrated once again, in 1937, this time to Istanbul, Turkey. He lived and worked there for thirty years.

From 1937 to 1954 he was a lecturer at the Academy of Fine Arts in Istanbul, re-organizing the department of sculpture and mediating introductions towards modern art, basing his work on traditional studies. In 1939, he managed to fly out his son illegally from Berlin to Turkey. In 1942, he married his second wife Yolanda Carolina Manzini, who was from an Italian-German family, and in 1943, his daughter Elisabeth was born.

From 1943 to 1944 he made a statue of İsmet İnönü realised in bronze, even though even the plinth was ready, due to the change of government in 1950 the statue was not erected. It was finally erected in 1982 in the Maçka Park. This statue is particularly notable as the first statue made of İnönü and it was (at least as of 1993) the 2nd largest İnönü statue in existence after the statue that was erected in the mid-1980s in the garden of İnönü's house in Ankara.

From 1951 to 1966, he was a lecturer at the Istanbul Technical University, at the department of architecture. He was a member of the selection committee that judged submissions for relief designs being made for the Anıtkabir which went on from 1951 to 1953. 1955, he got the Federal Cross of Merit. He was called back to the academy in West Berlin only in 1956, the same year the works which stayed in New York could be received back with the help of the Foreign Office.

At the age of eighty, he decided to return to West Germany again, where he lived in Krailling, near Munich. He died in Munich in June 1972, being highly decorated by the German government with the Federal Cross of Merit with Star.

The archive is meanwhile managed by his daughter Elisabeth Weber-Belling.
