= Culture of Turkey =

Turkish culture
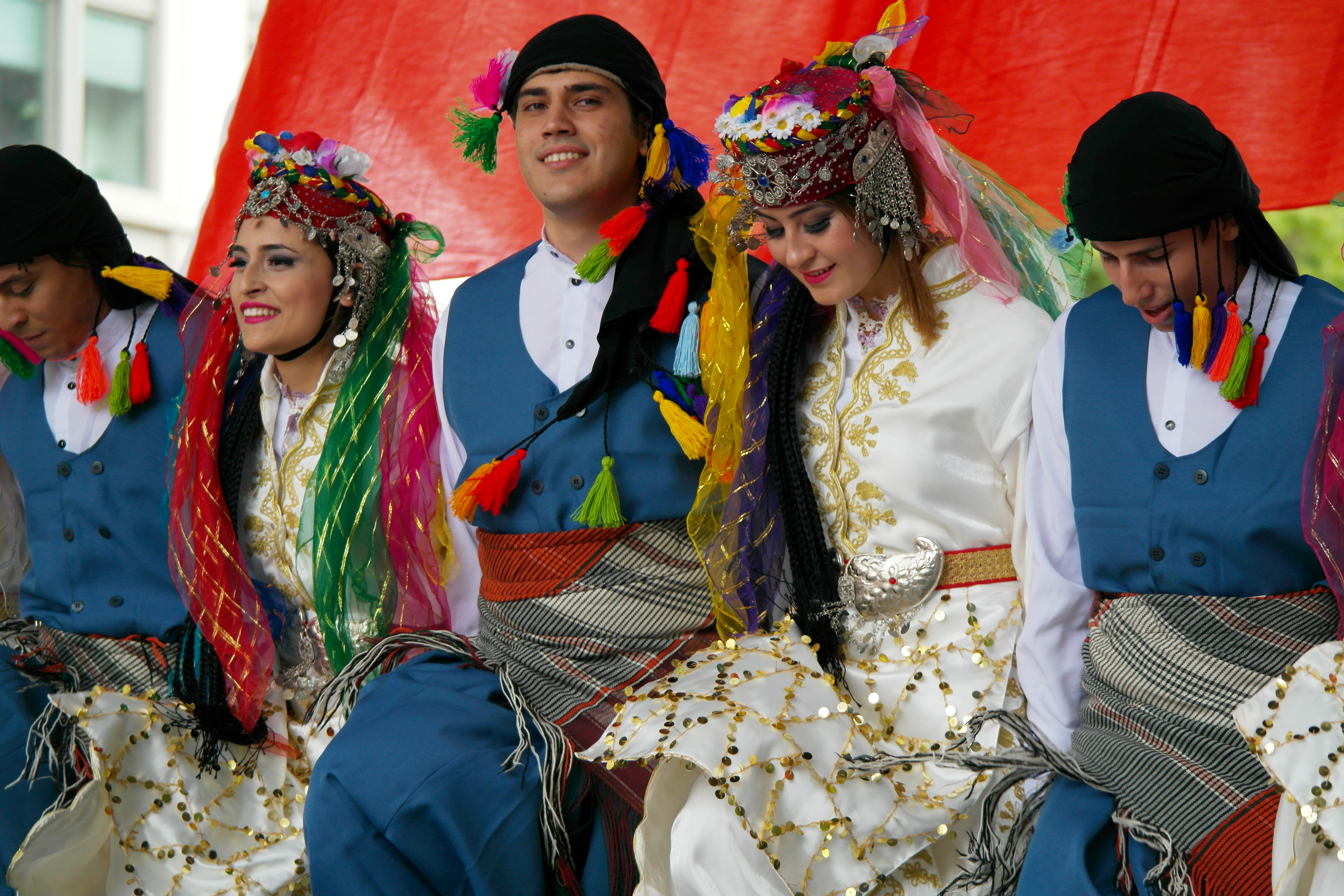
- Folk dance at a Turkish culture festival in Washington, D.C., 2013

The culture of Turkey (Turkish: Türkiye kültürü) or the Turkish culture (Türk kültürü) has been formed by its historical legacy, geographical position, and diverse population. Straddling Europe and Asia, Turkey has been a nexus of civilizations, including the Hittites, Romans, Byzantines, and Ottomans. This confluence has created a unique cultural identity that blends Eastern and Western traditions. Modern Turkish culture reflects this synthesis, evident in its art, architecture, cuisine, and social customs. Turkey has various local cultures. Aspects such as folk dances, food or music differ from region to region.

== Background ==
=== Anatolian heritage ===
Before the rise of the Ottoman Empire, Anatolia was home to various civilizations, such as the Hittites, Phrygians, Urartians, Greeks, and Byzantines. These cultures contributed to the region's rich archaeological and architectural legacy, including temples, theaters, and fortresses that continue to influence Turkish cultural expressions today.

=== Ottoman legacy ===
The Ottoman Empire, spanning over six centuries, left an indelible mark on Turkish culture. It fostered advancements in architecture, literature, music, and cuisine with diverse regional influences from the Balkans, Mediterranean and the Middle East. The empire's cosmopolitan nature and the multi-religious millet system encouraged a multicultural society, the remnants of which are still evident in contemporary Turkey.

=== Republican Era ===
Following the establishment of the Republic in 1923, Mustafa Kemal Atatürk implemented sweeping reforms aimed at modernizing Turkey. These included the adoption of the Latin alphabet, secularization of the state, gender equality, promotion of Western attire and education. These changes significantly reshaped Turkish cultural and social life.

== Society and identity ==
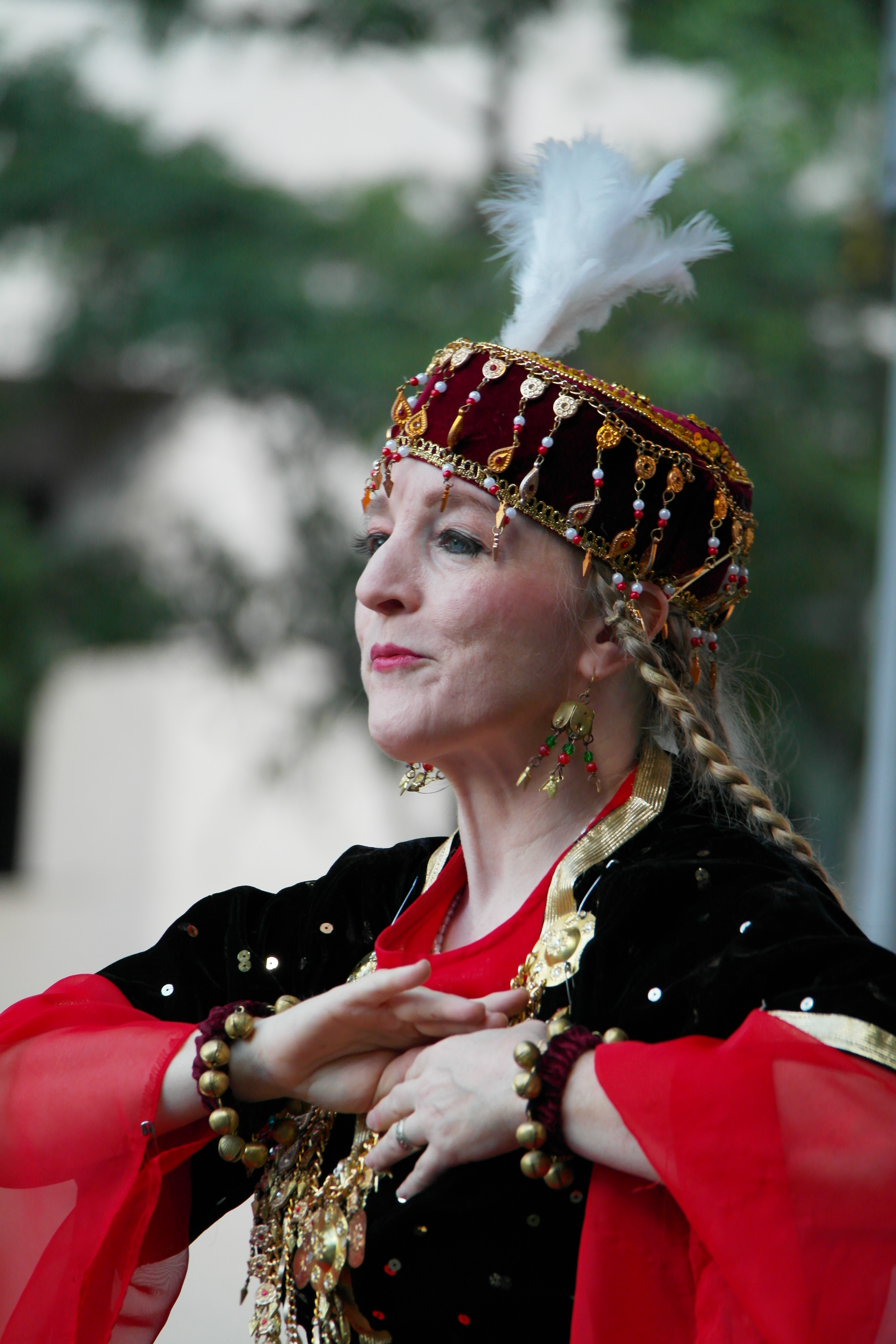
A woman in traditional clothing

=== Ethnicity and language ===
Turkey's population is predominantly Turkish, with significant Kurdish, Arab, Laz, Albanian, Circassian, and Armenian minorities. While Turkish is the official language, Kurdish and other minority languages are spoken, reflecting the country's ethnic diversity. Language policies have evolved, with increased recognition of minority languages in media and education. The Turkish language underwent major reforms in the early Republic, including the adoption of the Latin alphabet in 1928 and the purification of vocabulary from Arabic and Persian terms. These reforms aimed to increase literacy and promote national unity. Today, Turkish remains the dominant language, although minority languages such as Kurdish and Armenian are also spoken and increasingly recognized in media and education.

=== Religion and secularism ===
Islam is the predominant religion in Turkey, yet the state has maintained a secular constitution since the republic's founding. In recent years, scholars have noted a shift towards increased religious influence in public life, with some arguing that secularism has become more symbolic than practical.

=== Family and gender roles ===
Traditional family structures in Turkey emphasize patriarchal authority and extended kinship networks. However, urbanization and modernization have led to changes, with nuclear families becoming more common and women's participation in education and the workforce increasing. World's first female fighter pilot, Sabiha Gökçen and first jet pilot, Leman Altınçekiç were both officers in Turkish Armed Forces

=== Regional and urban variation ===
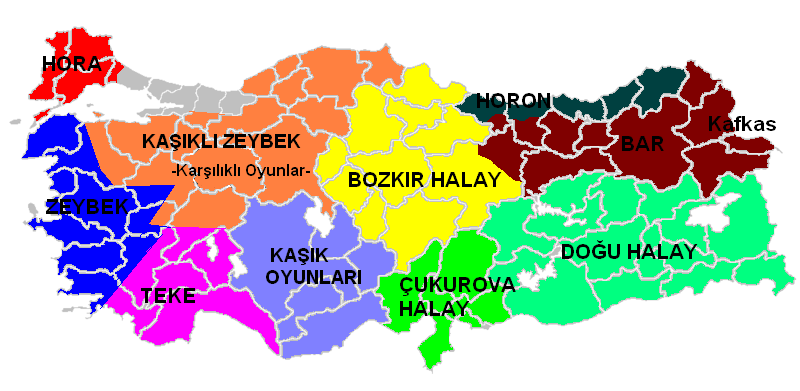
Turkish folk dance regions

Turkish society is not homogenic and cultural practices in Turkey vary significantly between regions. Urban centers like Istanbul and Ankara exhibit more Westernized lifestyles, while rural areas often maintain traditional customs and social norms. These differences reflected in dialects, cuisine, and social behaviors as well as physical appearance.

== Arts and literature ==
=== Literature ===
Namık Kemal was a prominent Turkish poet, novelist, playwright and journalist of the late-19th-century Ottoman Empire.

Turkish literature is the collection of written and oral texts composed in the Turkish language, either in its Ottoman form or in less exclusively literary forms, such as that spoken in the Republic of Turkey today. Traditional examples for Turkish folk literature include stories of Karagöz and Hacivat, Keloğlan, İncili Çavuş and Nasreddin Hoca, as well as the works of folk poets such as Yunus Emre and Aşık Veysel. The Book of Dede Korkut and the Epic of Köroğlu have been the main elements of the Turkish epic tradition in Anatolia for several centuries.

The two primary streams of Ottoman literature were poetry and prose. Of the two, the Ottoman Divan poetry, a highly ritualized and symbolic art form, was the dominant stream. The vast majority of Divan poetry was lyric in nature: either ghazals or qasidas. There were, however, other common genres, most particularly the mathnawi (also known as mesnevî), a kind of verse romance and thus a variety of narrative poetry. The tradition of Ottoman prose was exclusively non-fictional in nature; as the fiction tradition was limited to narrative poetry.

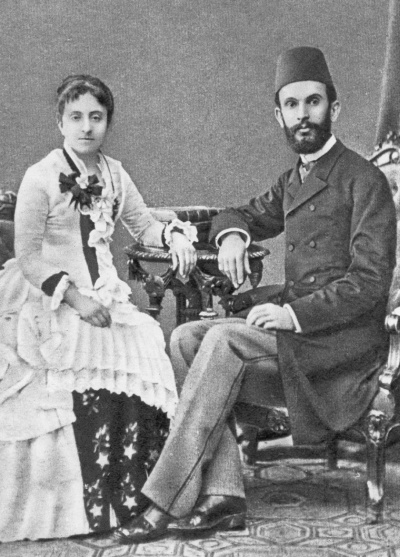
Sami Frashëri (1850–1904) and his wife Emine, May 1884.

The Tanzimat reforms of 1839–1876 brought changes to the language of Ottoman written literature and introduced previously unknown Western genres, primarily the novel and the short story. Many of the writers in the Tanzimat period wrote in several different genres simultaneously: for instance, the poet Namık Kemal also wrote the important 1876 novel İntibâh (Awakening), while the journalist İbrahim Şinasi is noted for writing, in 1860, the first modern Turkish play, the one-act comedy "Şair Evlenmesi" (The Poet's Marriage). Most of the roots of modern Turkish literature were formed between the years 1896 and 1923. Broadly, there were three primary literary movements during this period: the Edebiyyât-ı Cedîde (New Literature) movement; the Fecr-i Âtî (Dawn of the Future) movement; and the Millî Edebiyyât (National Literature) movement. The Edebiyyât-ı Cedîde (New Literature) movement began with the founding in 1891 of the magazine Servet-i Fünûn (Scientific Wealth), which was largely devoted to progress (both intellectual and scientific) along the Western model. Accordingly, the magazine's literary ventures, under the direction of the poet Tevfik Fikret, were geared towards creating a Western-style "high art" in Turkey.

==== Poetry ====
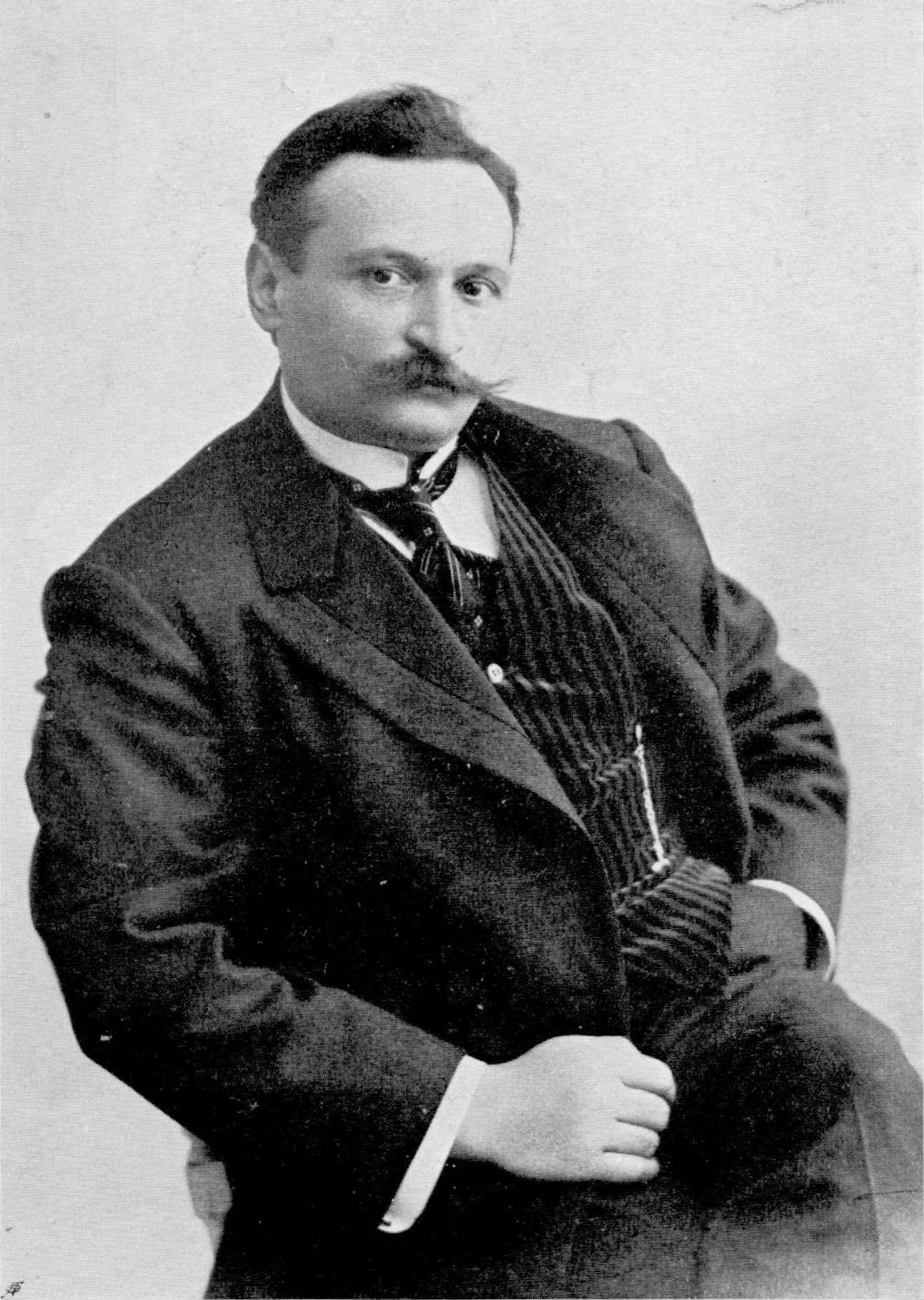
Tevfik Fikret (1867–1915) was a prominent Turkish poet of the late Ottoman era.

The 'folk poetry' as indicated above, was strongly influenced by the Islamic Sunni and Shi'a traditions. Furthermore, as partly evidenced by the prevalence of the still-existent ashik ("aşık" or "ozan") tradition, the dominant element in Turkish folk poetry has always been song. The development of folk poetry in Turkish—which began to emerge in the 13th century with such important writers as Yunus Emre, Sultan Veled, and Şeyyâd Hamza—was given a great boost when, on 13 May 1277, Karamanoğlu Mehmed Bey declared Turkish the official state language of Anatolia's powerful Karamanid state; subsequently, many of the tradition's greatest poets would continue to emerge from this region.

There are, broadly speaking, two traditions of Turkish folk poetries;

- the aşık/ozan tradition, which—although much influenced by religion, as mentioned above—was, for the most part, a secular tradition;
- the explicitly religious tradition, which emerged from the gathering places (tekkes) of the Sufi religious orders and Shi'a groups.

Much of the poetry and song of the aşık/ozan tradition, being almost exclusively oral until the 19th century, remains anonymous. There are, however, a few well-known aşıks from before that time whose names have survived together with their works: the aforementioned Köroğlu (16th century); Karacaoğlan (1606?–1689?), who may be the best-known of the pre-19th century aşıks; Dadaloğlu (1785?–1868?), who was one of the last of the great aşıks before the tradition began to dwindle somewhat in the late 19th century; and several others. The aşıks were essentially minstrels who traveled through Anatolia performing their songs on the bağlama, a mandolin-like instrument whose paired strings are considered to have a symbolic religious significance in Alevi/Bektashi culture. Despite the decline of the aşık/ozan tradition in the 19th century, it experienced a significant revival in the 20th century thanks to such outstanding figures as Aşık Veysel Şatıroğlu (1894–1973), Aşık Mahzuni Şerif (1938–2002), Neşet Ertaş (1938–2012), and many others.

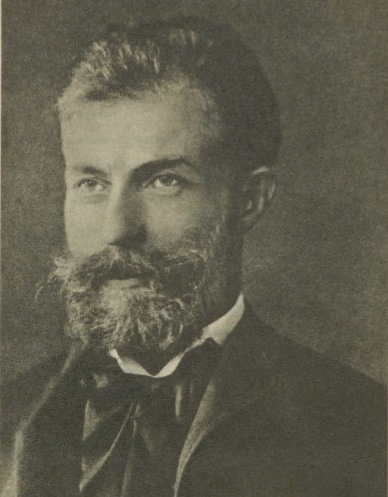
Recaizade Mahmud Ekrem (1847–1914) was another prominent Turkish poet of the late Ottoman era.

Ottoman Divan poetry was a highly ritualized and symbolic art form. From the Persian poetry that largely inspired it, it inherited a wealth of symbols whose meanings and interrelationships—both of similitude (مراعات نظير mura'ât-i nazîr / تناسب tenâsüb) and opposition (تضاد tezâd)—were more or less prescribed. Examples of prevalent symbols that, to some extent, oppose one another include, among others:

the nightingale (بلبل bülbül) — the rose (ﮔل gül) the world (جهان cihan; عالم 'âlem) — the rosegarden (ﮔﻠﺴﺘﺎن gülistan; ﮔﻠﺸﻦ gülşen) the ascetic (زاهد zâhid) — the dervish (درويش derviş)

In the early years of the Republic of Turkey, there were a number of poetic trends. Authors such as Ahmed Hâşim and Yahyâ Kemâl Beyatlı (1884–1958) continued to write important formal verse whose language was, to a great extent, a continuation of the late Ottoman tradition. By far the majority of the poetry of the time, however, was in the tradition of the folk-inspired "syllabist" movement (Five Syllabists or Beş Hececiler), which had emerged from the National Literature movement and which tended to express patriotic themes couched in the syllabic meter associated with Turkish folk poetry.

The first radical step away from this trend was taken by Nâzım Hikmet, who—during his time as a student in the Soviet Union from 1921 to 1924—was exposed to the modernist poetry of Vladimir Mayakovsky and others, which inspired him to start writing verse in a less formal style.

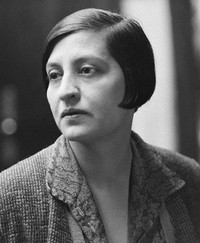
Halide Edip Adıvar was a novelist, teacher, and a nationalist and feminist intellectual.

Another revolution in Turkish poetry came about in 1941 with the publication of a small volume of verse preceded by an essay and entitled Garip (meaning both "miserable" and "strange"). The authors were Orhan Veli Kanık (1914–1950), Melih Cevdet Anday (1915–2002), and Oktay Rifat (1914–1988). Explicitly opposing themselves to everything that had gone in poetry before, they sought instead to create a popular art, "to explore the people's tastes, to determine them, and to make them reign supreme over art".[21] To this end, and inspired in part by contemporary French poets like Jacques Prévert, they employed not only a variant of the free verse introduced by Nâzım Hikmet, but also highly colloquial language, and wrote primarily about mundane daily subjects and the ordinary man on the street. The reaction was immediate and polarized: most of the academic establishment and older poets vilified them, while much of the Turkish population embraced them wholeheartedly.

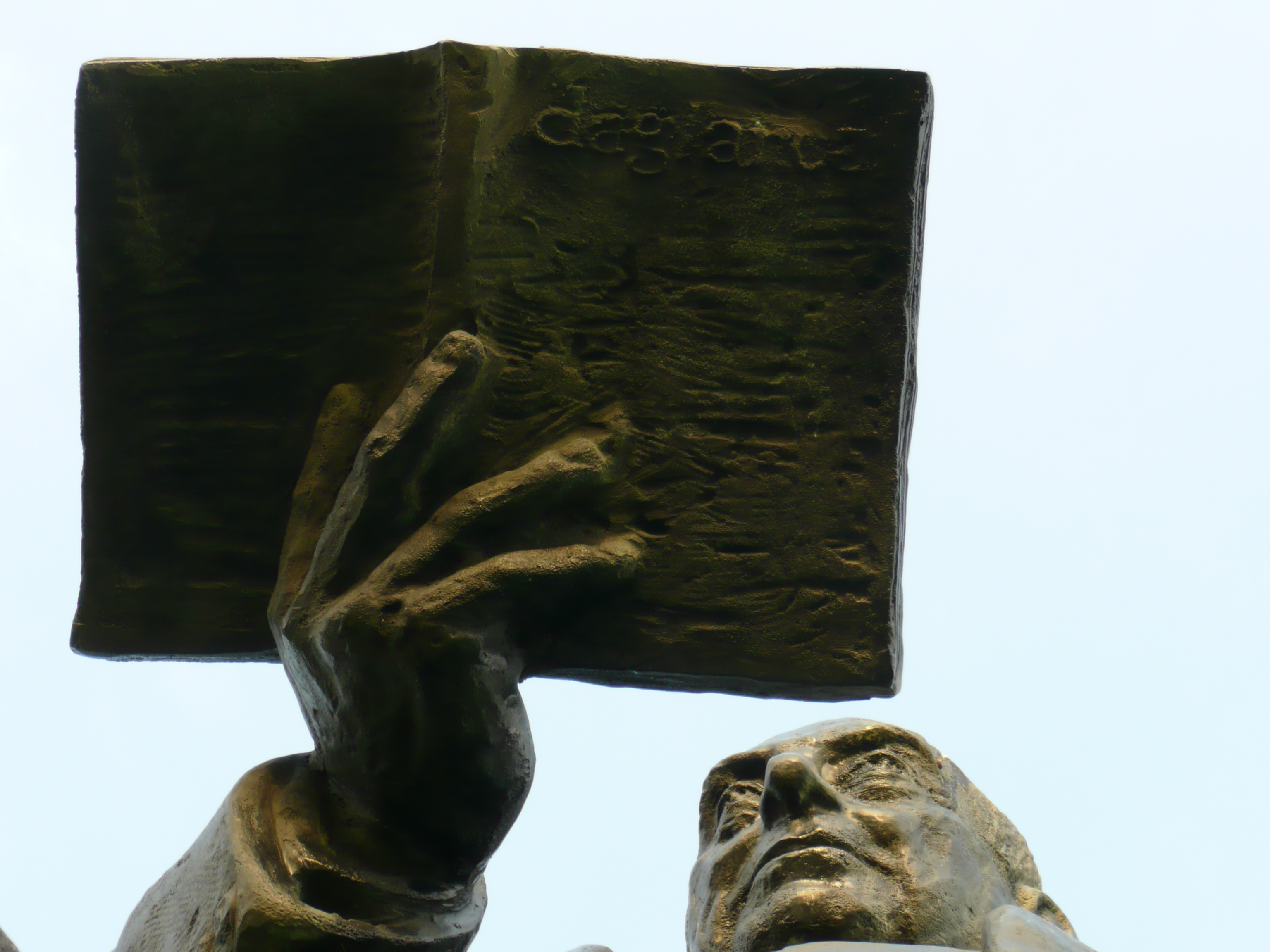
Fazıl Hüsnü Dağlarca was one of the most prolific Turkish poets of the Turkish Republic with more than 60 collections of his poems published, laureate of the Struga Poetry Evenings Golden Wreath Award.

Just as the Garip movement was a reaction against earlier poetry, so—in the 1950s and afterwards—was there a reaction against the Garip movement. The poets of this movement, soon known as İkinci Yeni ("Second New"[22]), opposed themselves to the social aspects prevalent in the poetry of Nâzım Hikmet and the Garip poets, and instead—partly inspired by the disruption of language in such Western movements as Dada and Surrealism—sought to create a more abstract poetry through the use of jarring and unexpected language, complex images, and the association of ideas. To some extent, the movement can be seen as bearing some of the characteristics of postmodern literature. The best-known poets writing in the "Second New" vein were Turgut Uyar (1927–1985), Edip Cansever (1928–1986), Cemal Süreya (1931–1990), Ece Ayhan (1931–2002), and İlhan Berk (1918–2008).

Outside of the Garip and "Second New" movements also, a number of significant poets have flourished, such as Fazıl Hüsnü Dağlarca (1914–2008), who wrote poems dealing with fundamental concepts like life, death, God, time, and the cosmos; Behçet Necatigil (1916–1979), whose somewhat allegorical poems explore the significance of middle-class daily life; Can Yücel (1926–1999), who—in addition to his own highly colloquial and varied poetry—was also a translator into Turkish of a variety of world literature; and İsmet Özel (1944– ), whose early poetry was highly leftist but whose poetry since the 1970s has shown a strong mystical and even Islamist influence.

==== Prose ====
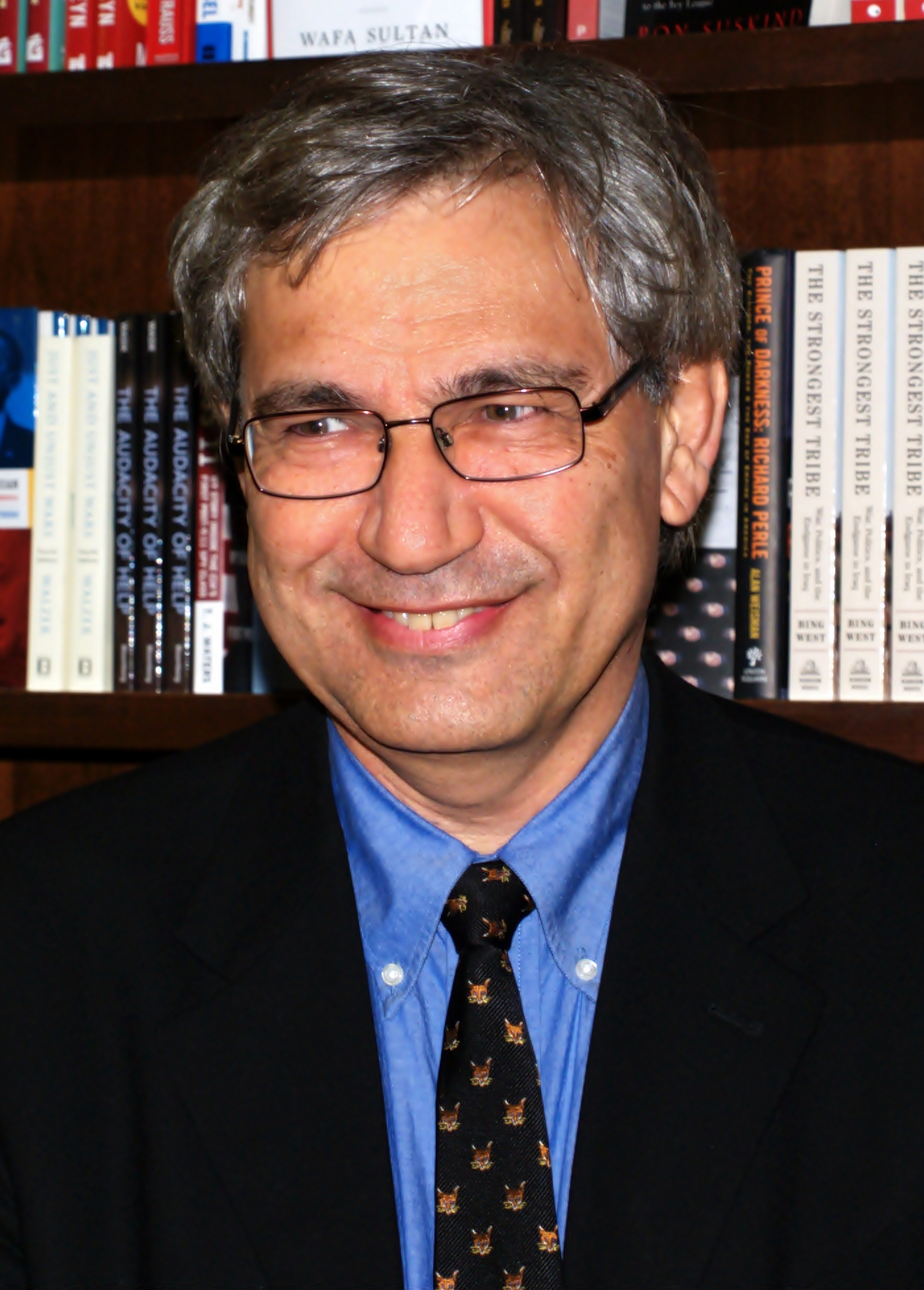
Orhan Pamuk, winner of the 2006 Nobel Prize in Literature.

The style of the current novelists can be traced back to the Genç Kalemler journal in the Ottoman period. Young Pens was published in Selanik under Ömer Seyfettin, Ziya Gökalp and Ali Canip Yöntem. They covered the social and political concepts of their time with the nationalistic perspective. They were the core of a movement which became known as the "national literature."

With the declaration of the Turkish Republic in 1923, Turkish literature became interested in folkloric styles. This was also the first time since the 19th century that Turkish literature was escaping from Western influence and began to mix Western forms with other forms. During the 1930s, Yakup Kadri Karaosmanoğlu and Vedat Nedim Tör published Kadro, which was revolutionary in its view of life.

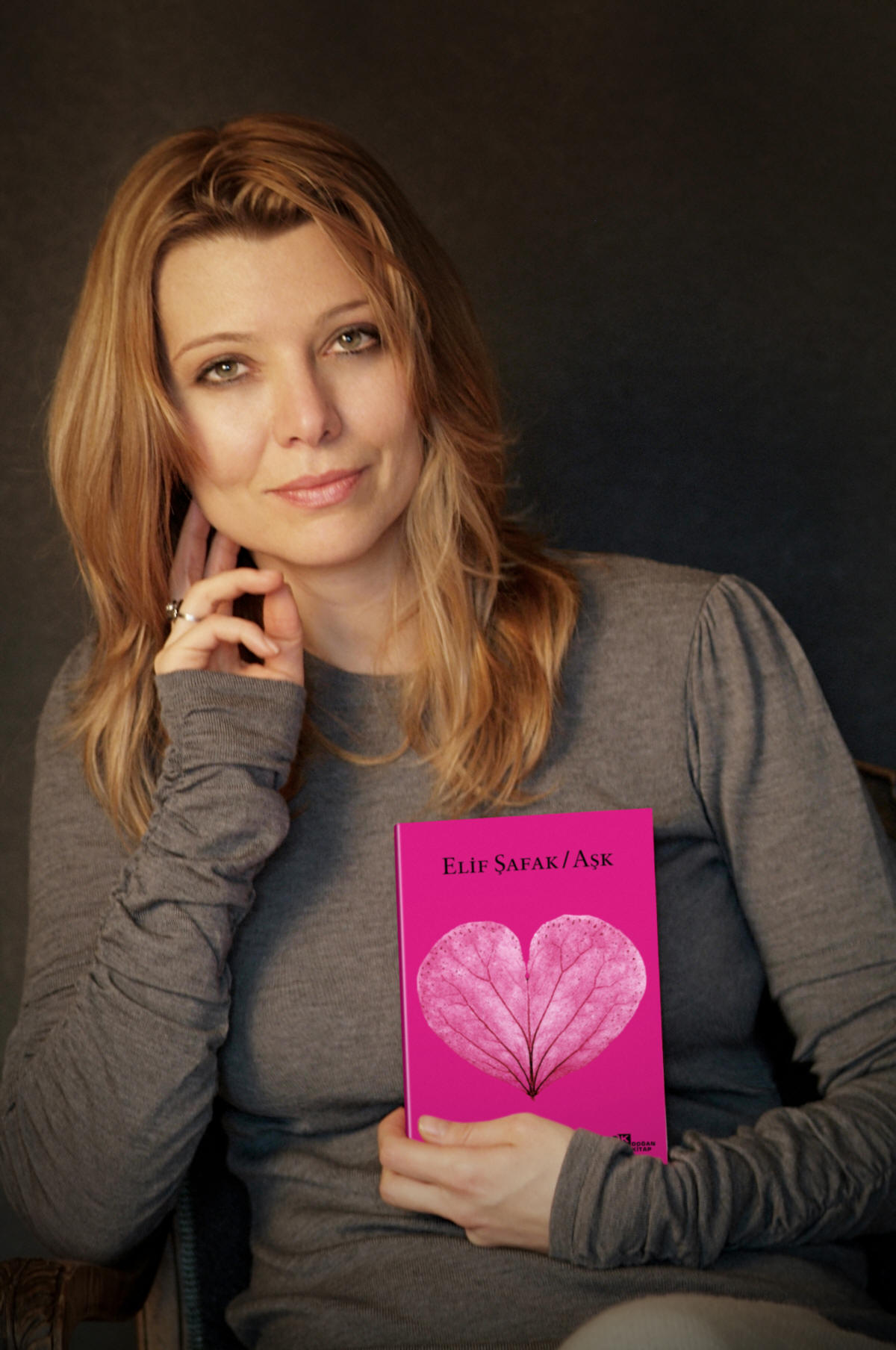
Elif Şafak, a prominent writer and LGBT activist.

Stylistically, the early prose of the Republic of Turkey was essentially a continuation of the National Literature movement, with Realism and Naturalism predominating. This trend culminated in the 1932 novel Yaban (The Wilds) by Yakup Kadri Karaosmanoğlu. This novel can be seen as the precursor to two trends that would soon develop: social realism, and the "village novel" (köy romanı). The social realist movement was led by the short-story writer Sait Faik Abasıyanık. The major writers of the "village novel" tradition were Kemal Tahir, Orhan Kemal, and Yaşar Kemal. In a very different tradition, but evincing a similar strong political viewpoint, was the satirical short-story writer Aziz Nesin. Other important novelists of this period were Ahmet Hamdi Tanpınar and Oğuz Atay. Orhan Pamuk, winner of the 2006 Nobel Prize in Literature, is among the innovative novelists, whose works show the influence of postmodernism and magic realism. Important poets of the Republic of Turkey period include Ahmet Haşim, Yahya Kemal Beyatlı and Nâzım Hikmet (who introduced the free verse style). Orhan Veli Kanık, Melih Cevdet Anday and Oktay Rifat led the Garip movement; while Turgut Uyar, Edip Cansever and Cemal Süreya led the İkinci Yeni movement. Outside of the Garip and İkinci Yeni movements, a number of other significant poets such as Fazıl Hüsnü Dağlarca, Behçet Necatigil and Can Yücel also flourished.

The mix of cultural influences in Turkey is dramatized, for example, in the form of the "new symbols of the clash and interlacing of cultures" enacted in the novels of Orhan Pamuk, recipient of the 2006 Nobel Prize in Literature.

=== Visual arts ===
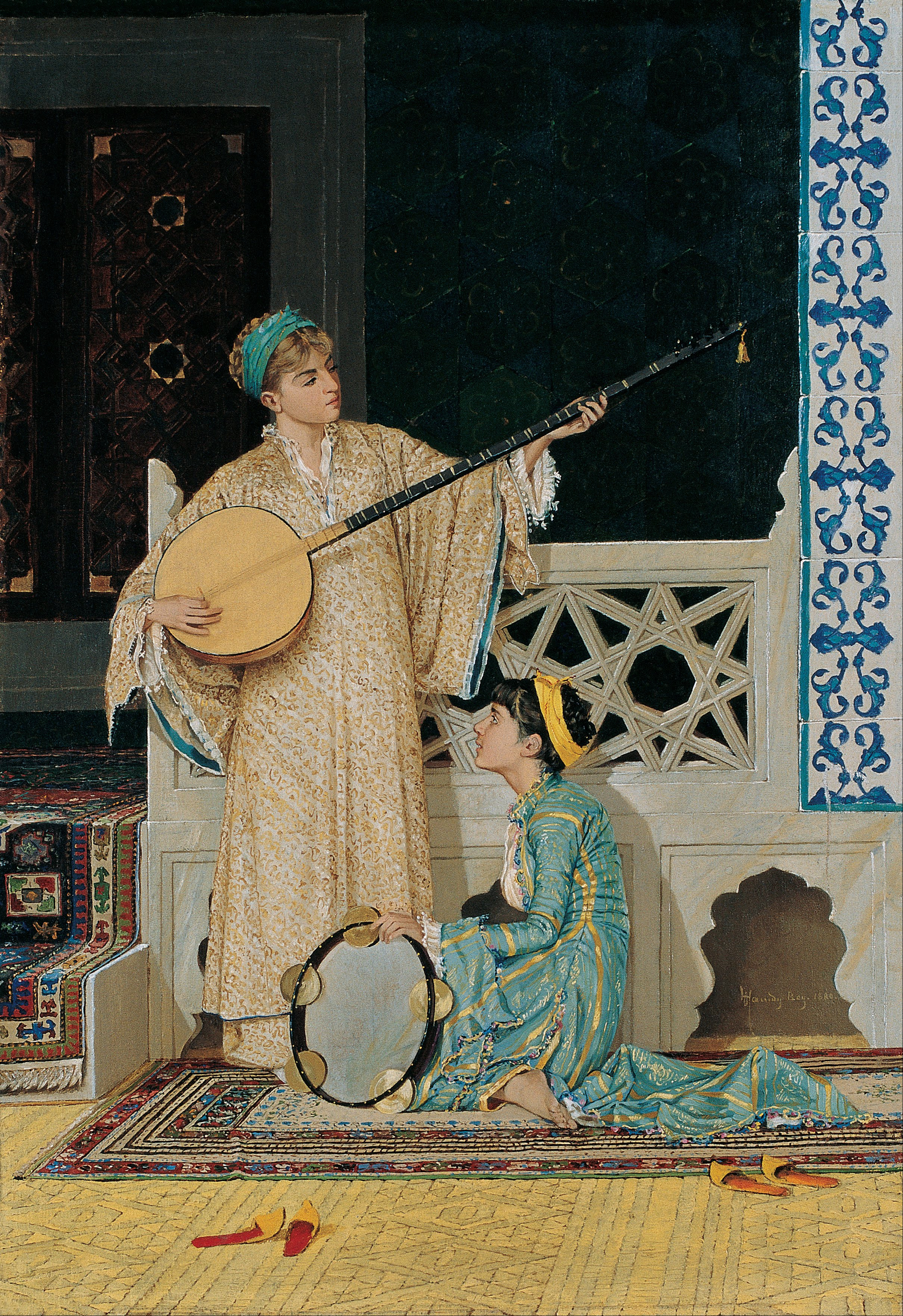
'Two Musician Girls' of Osman Hamdi Bey.

Traditional Turkish visual arts include calligraphy, miniature painting, and tilework, often featuring intricate geometric patterns and floral motifs. Contemporary Turkish artists have expanded into various mediums, blending traditional themes with modern techniques to address social and political issues.

Ottoman miniature is linked to the Persian miniature tradition and is likewise influenced by Chinese painting styles and techniques. The words tasvir or nakış were used to define the art of miniature painting in Ottoman Turkish. The studios the artists worked in were called nakkaşhane. The understanding of perspective was different from that of the nearby European Renaissance painting tradition, and the scene depicted often included different time periods and spaces in one picture. They followed closely the context of the book they were included in, more illustrations than standalone works of art. Sixteenth-century artists Nakkaş Osman and Matrakçı Nasuh are among the most prominent artists of this era.

Turkish painting, in the Western sense, developed actively starting from the mid 19th century. The first painting lessons were scheduled at what is now the Istanbul Technical University (then the Imperial Military Engineering School) in 1793, mostly for technical purposes. In the late 19th century, human figure in the Western sense was being established in Turkish painting, especially with Osman Hamdi Bey. Impressionism, among the contemporary trends, appeared later on with Halil Pasha. Other important Turkish painters in the 19th century were Ferik İbrahim Paşa, Osman Nuri Paşa, Şeker Ahmet Paşa, and Hoca Ali Riza.

=== Architecture ===
Turkish architecture reflects its diverse history, from ancient Anatolian structures to Byzantine churches and Ottoman mosques. Iconic examples include the Hagia Sophia and the Blue Mosque in Istanbul. Modern architecture in Turkey often combines Western styles with traditional elements, creating a unique aesthetic.

==== Seljuk era ====
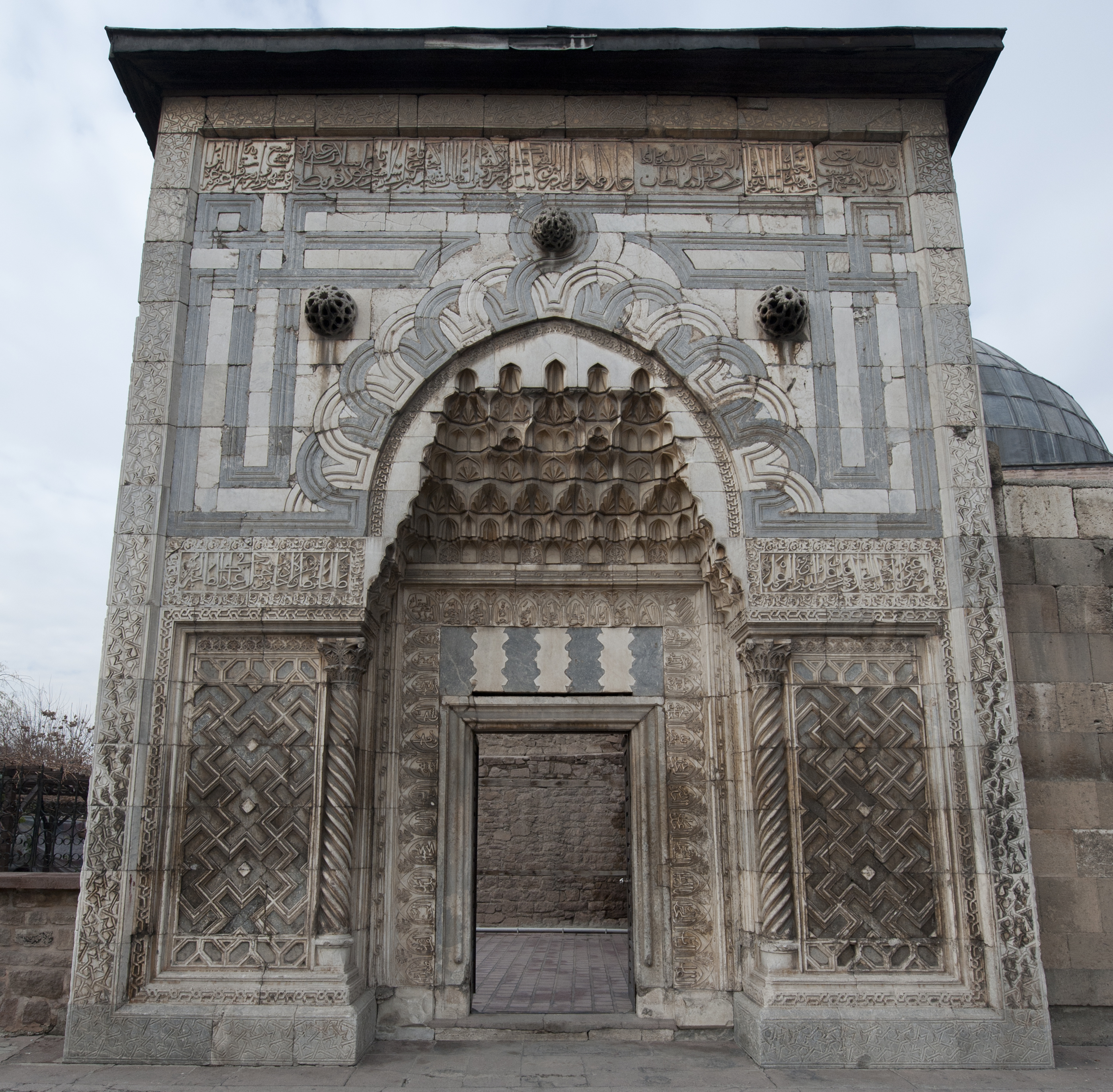
Entrance portal of the Karatay Madrasa in Konya (c. 1251)

Architecture under the Anatolian Seljuks incorporated an eclectic mix of influences, adopting local Byzantine, Armenian, and Georgian elements and combining them with designs from Islamic Syria, Iran, Iraq, and Central Asia. Their monuments were largely built in dressed stone, with brick used for minarets. Decoration was concentrated around certain elements like entrance portals and took the form of elaborate stone carving (e.g. the Ince Minareli Medrese and the Divriği complex), occasional ablaq stonework (e.g. Alâeddin Mosque in Konya), and large surfaces covered in tilework (e.g. Karatay Medrese). As Anatolia fragmented into Beyliks during the later 13th and 14th centuries, architecture became even more diverse, particularly in western Anatolia, where proximity to the Byzantine and Mediterranean worlds encouraged further experimentation and syncretism.

==== Ottoman era ====
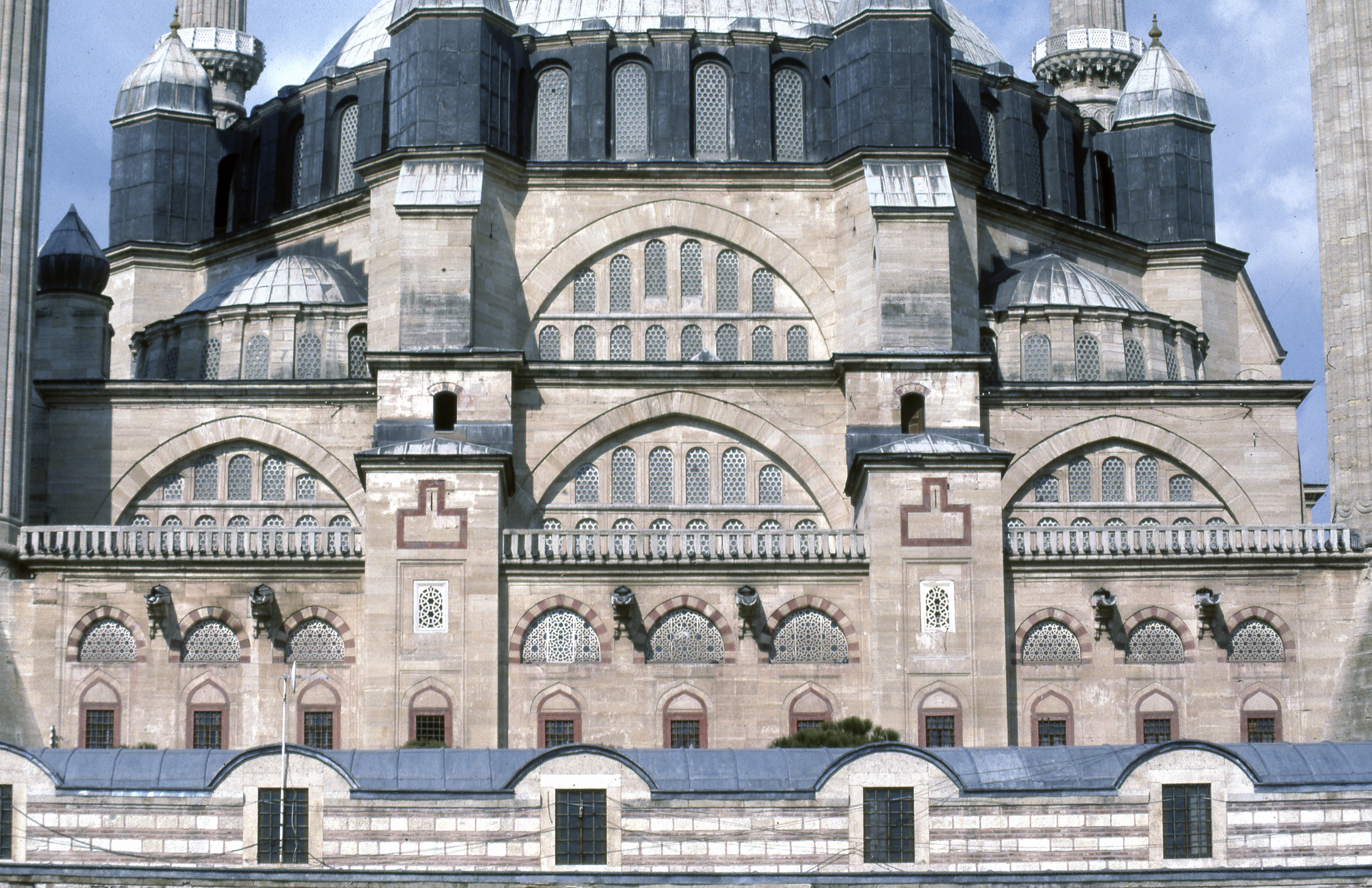
Selimiye Mosque in Edirne (1568–1574)

The architecture of the early Ottomans experimented with different building types, including single-domed mosques, multi-domed buildings, and religious buildings with T-shaped floor plans. This eventually evolved into the Classical Ottoman style that was consolidated during the 16th and 17th centuries. This style, drawing strong influence from the Hagia Sophia, produced grand imperial mosques designed around a central dome and a varying number of semi-domes. This period is also associated with the most famous Ottoman architect, Mimar Sinan (d. 1588). Among his over 300 designs across the empire, his most important works include the Şehzade Mosque in Istanbul, the Süleymaniye Mosque in Istanbul, and the Selimiye Mosque in Edirne. In decorative arts, Iznik tiles reached their artistic peak and were used in many buildings.

After the 17th century, Ottoman architecture was increasingly open to outside influences. Shifts during the Tulip Period were followed by the appearance of the Ottoman Baroque style in the 1740s. In the 19th century, Western European influences increased and architects such as the Balyans produced eclectic works like the luxurious Dolmabaçe Palace. In the early 20th-century, a kind of Ottoman revivalism known as the First National Architectural Movement was led by architects like Mimar Kemaleddin and Vedat Tek.

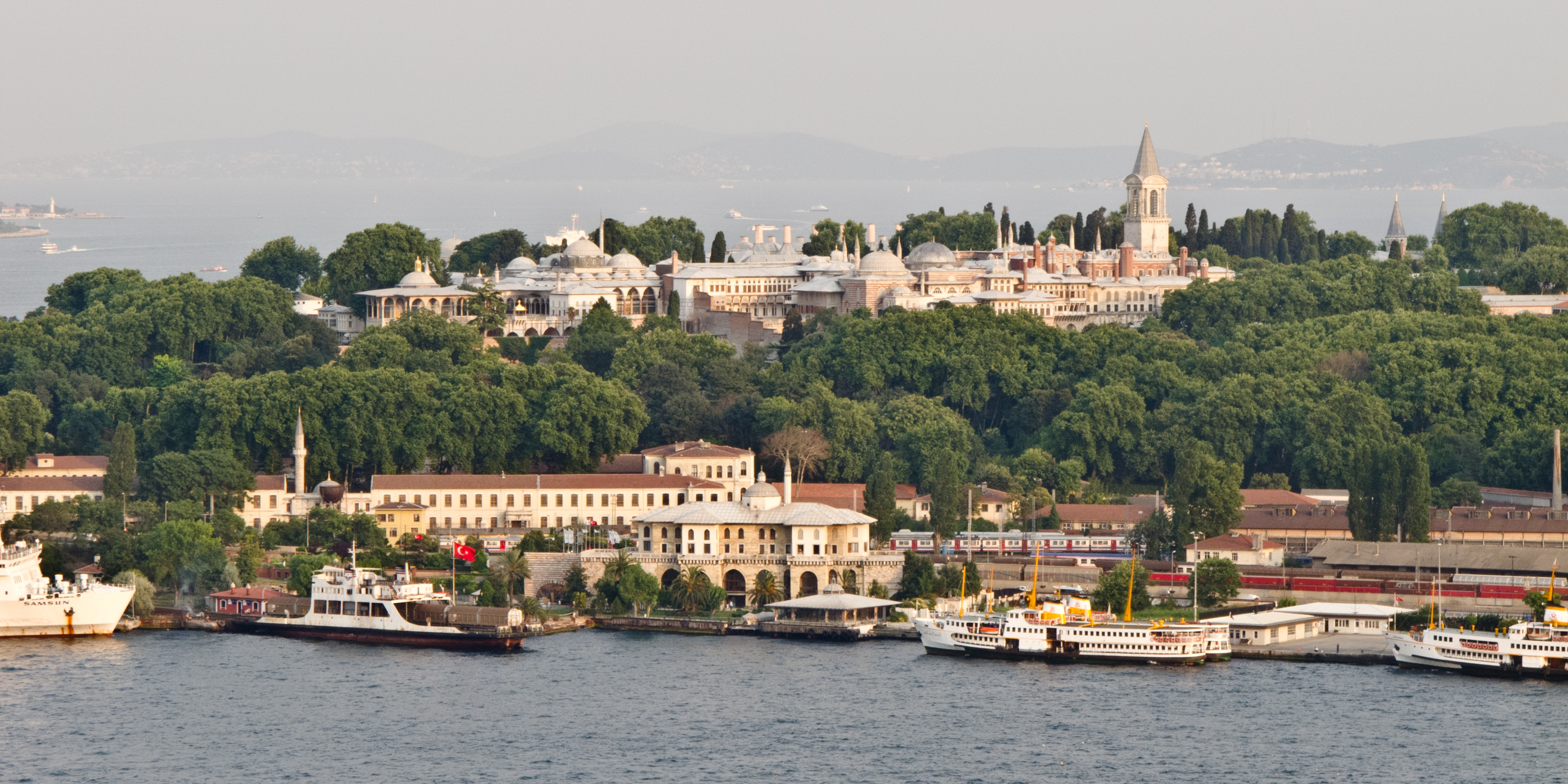
Topkapı Palace in Seraglio Point

Dolmabahçe Palace in Istanbul, built by the Balyan family

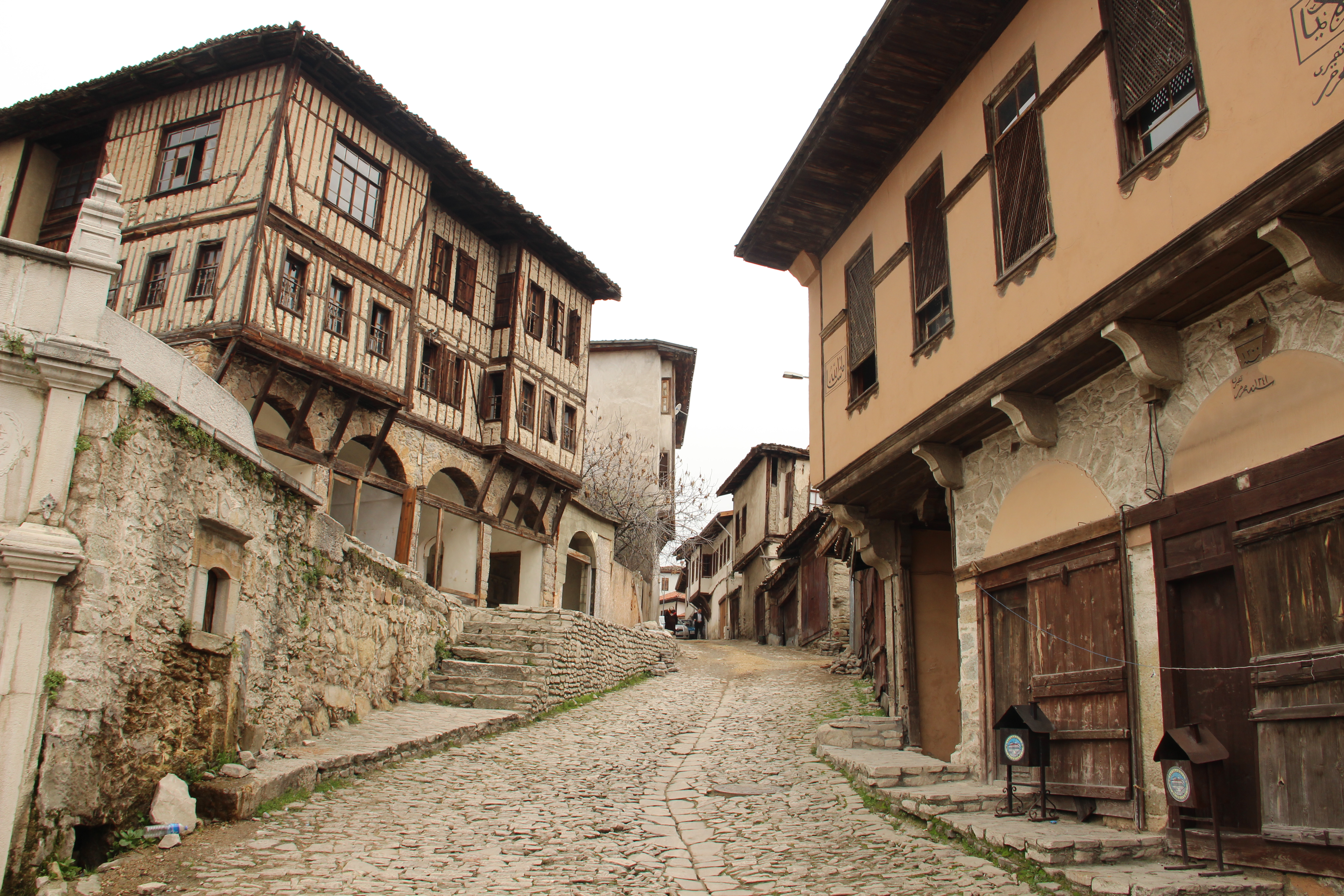
With its traditional Turkish houses, Safranbolu is a tentative UNESCO World Heritage site

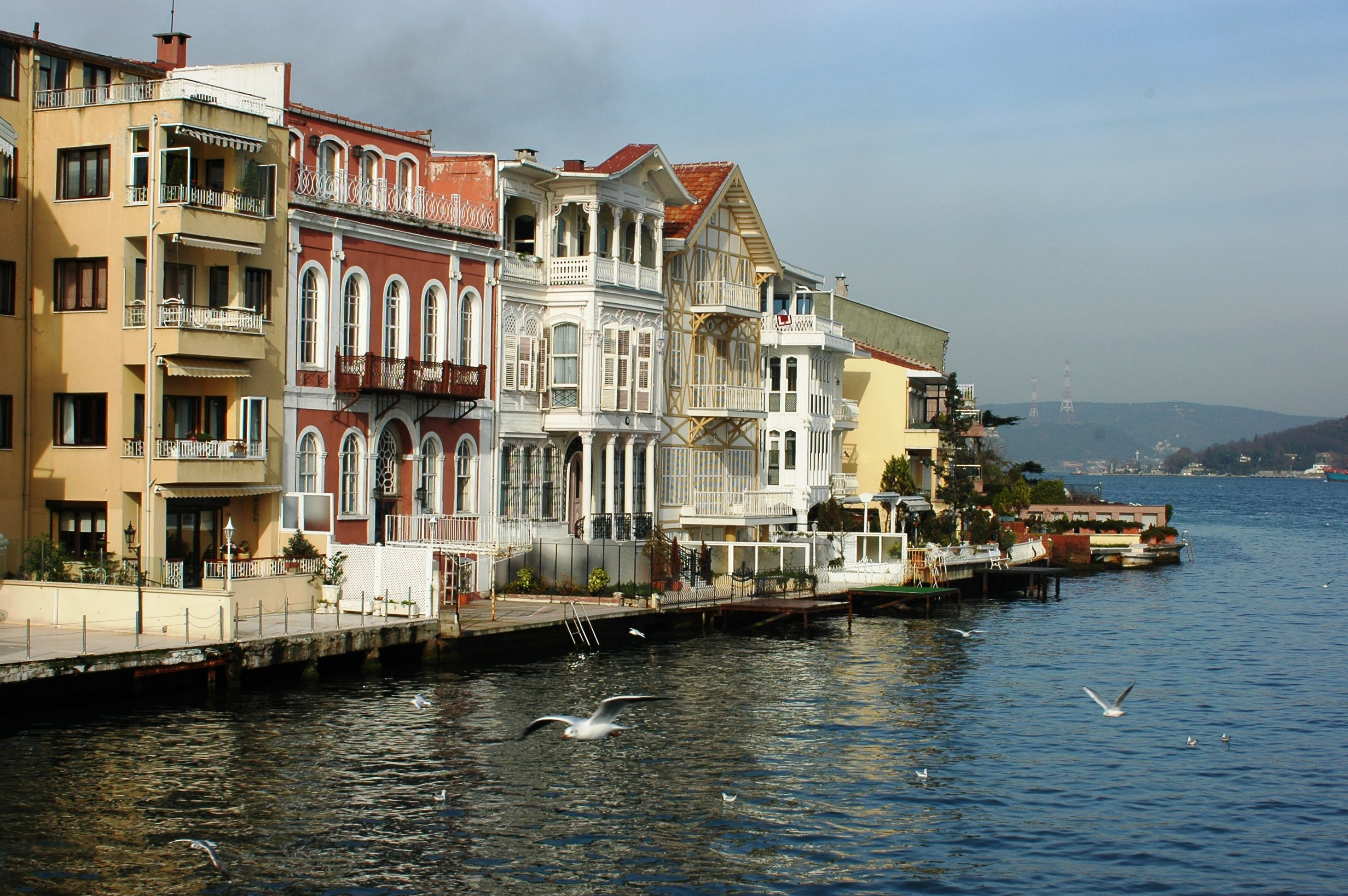
Yalıs along Sarıyer

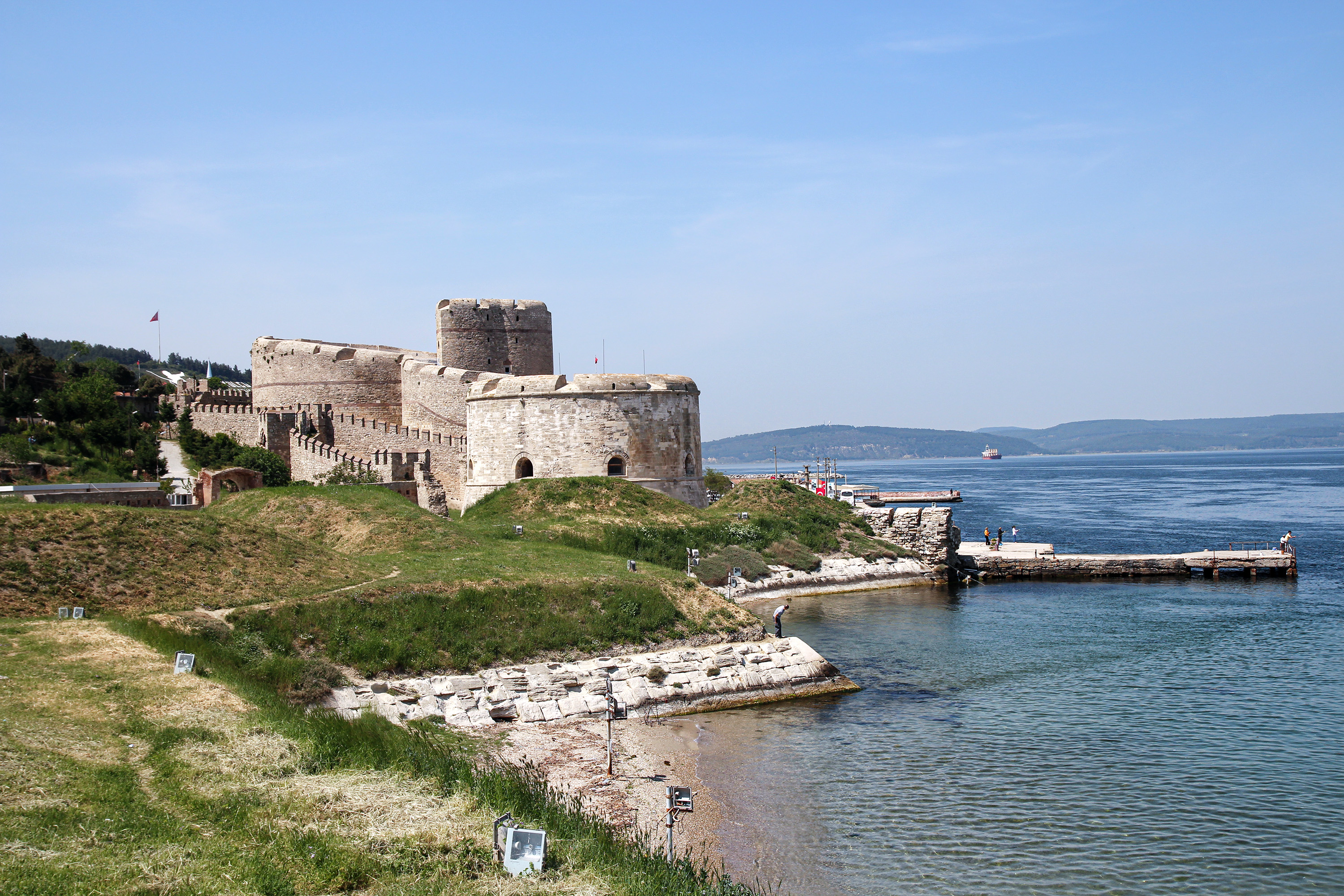
Kilitbahir in Gallipoli

==== Republican era ====
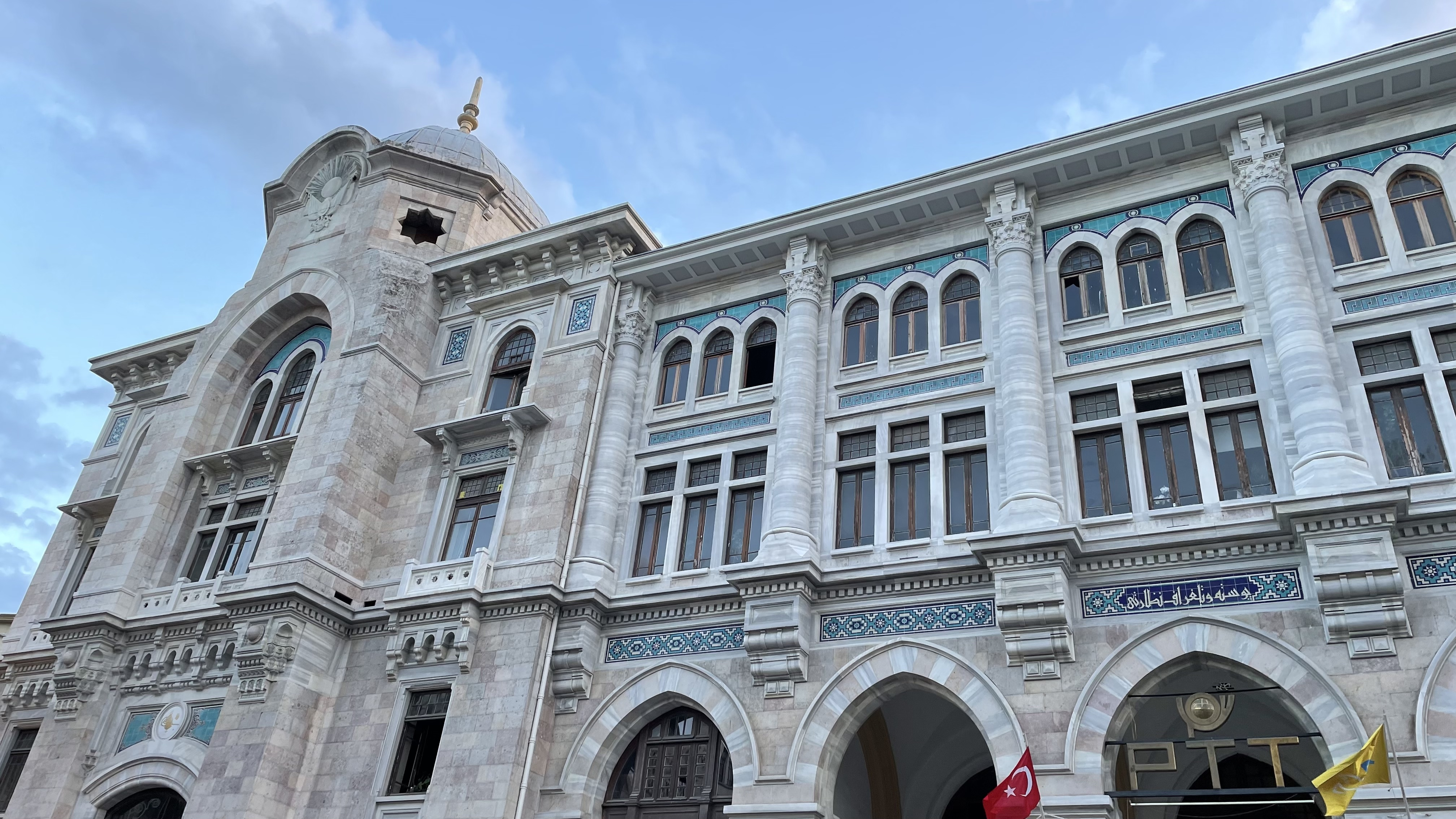
Grand Post Office in Istanbul, an example of the first national architectural movement.

In the first years of the Turkish Republic, founded in 1923, Turkish architecture was influenced by Ottoman architecture, in particular during the First National Architectural Movement. However, from the 1930s, architectural styles started to differ from traditional architecture, also as a result of an increasing number of foreign architects being invited to work in the country, mostly from Germany and Austria. The Second World War was a period of isolation, during which the Second National Architectural Movement emerged. Similar to Fascist architecture, the movement aimed to create modern but nationalistic architecture.

Starting from the 1950s, isolation from the rest of the world started to diminish, leading to Turkish architects being increasingly inspired by their counterparts in the rest of the world. However they were constrained by the lack of technological infrastructure or insufficient financial resources till the 1980s. Thereafter, the liberalization of the economy and the shift towards export-led growth, paved the way for the private sector to become the leading influence on architecture.

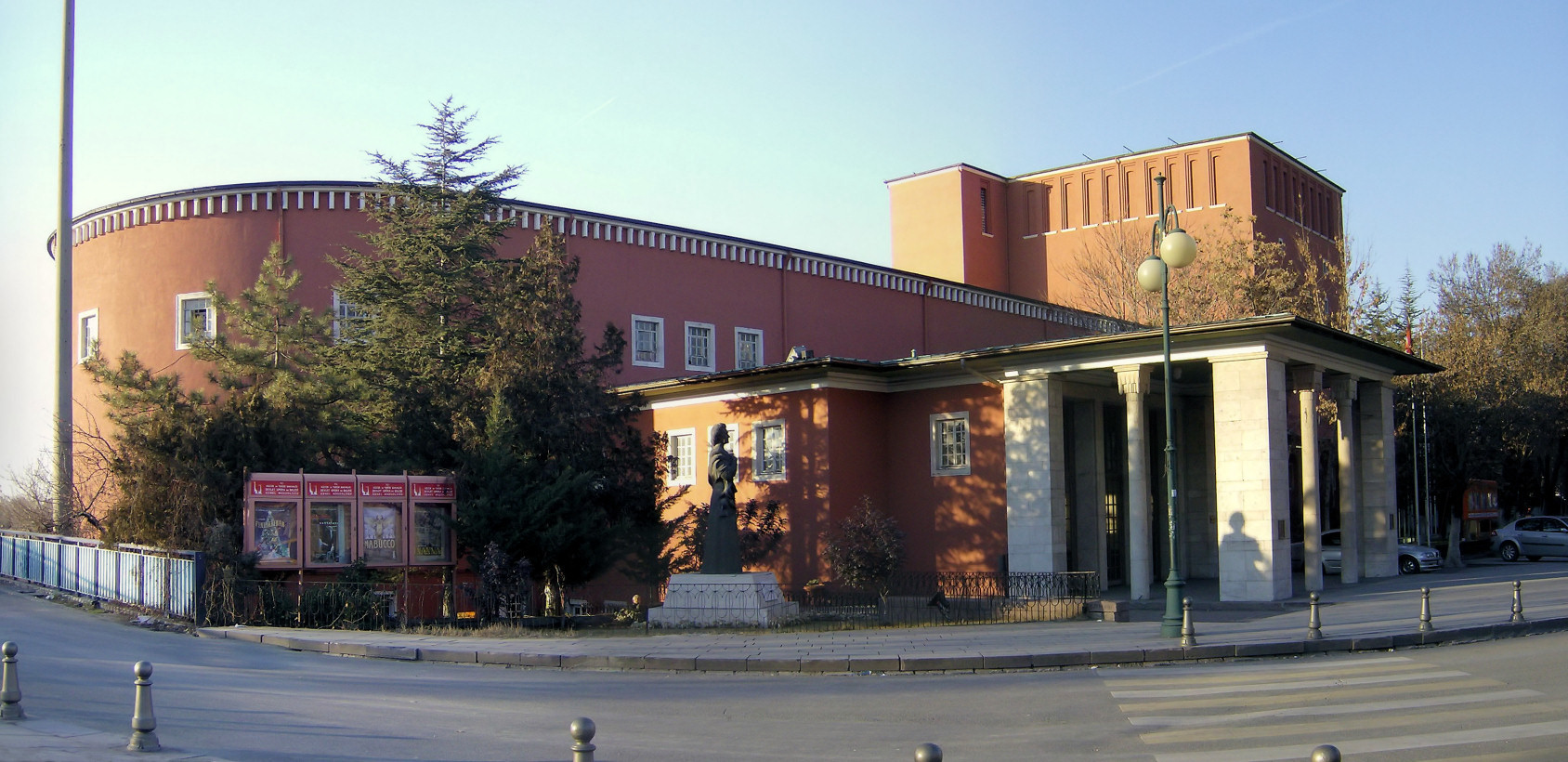
Ankara Opera House, designed by Şevki Balmumcu (1933–34) and renovation by Paul Bonatz (1946–47).

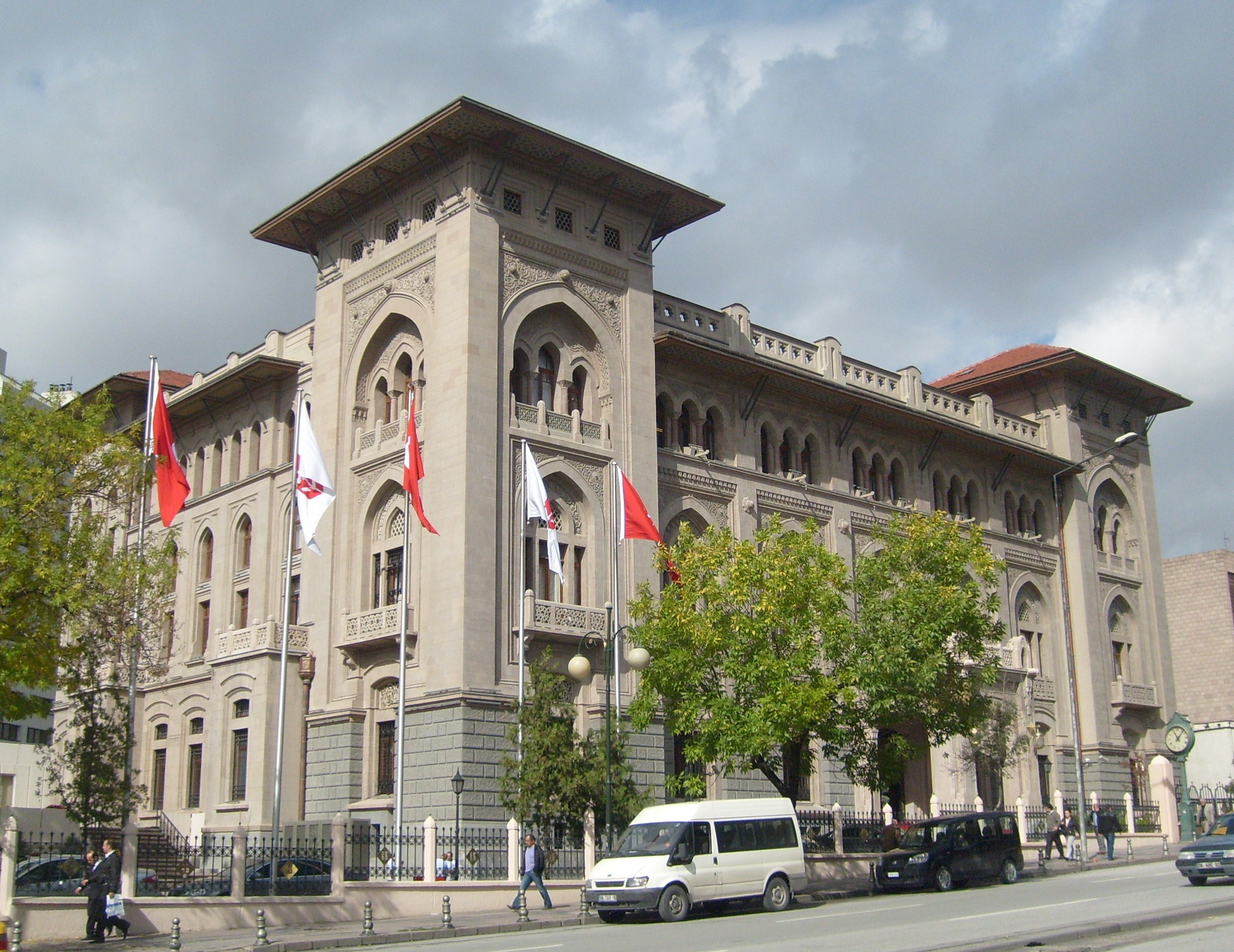
First Ziraat Bank Headquarters (1925–29) in Ankara designed by Giulio Mongeri is an important symbol of the First National Architectural Movement.

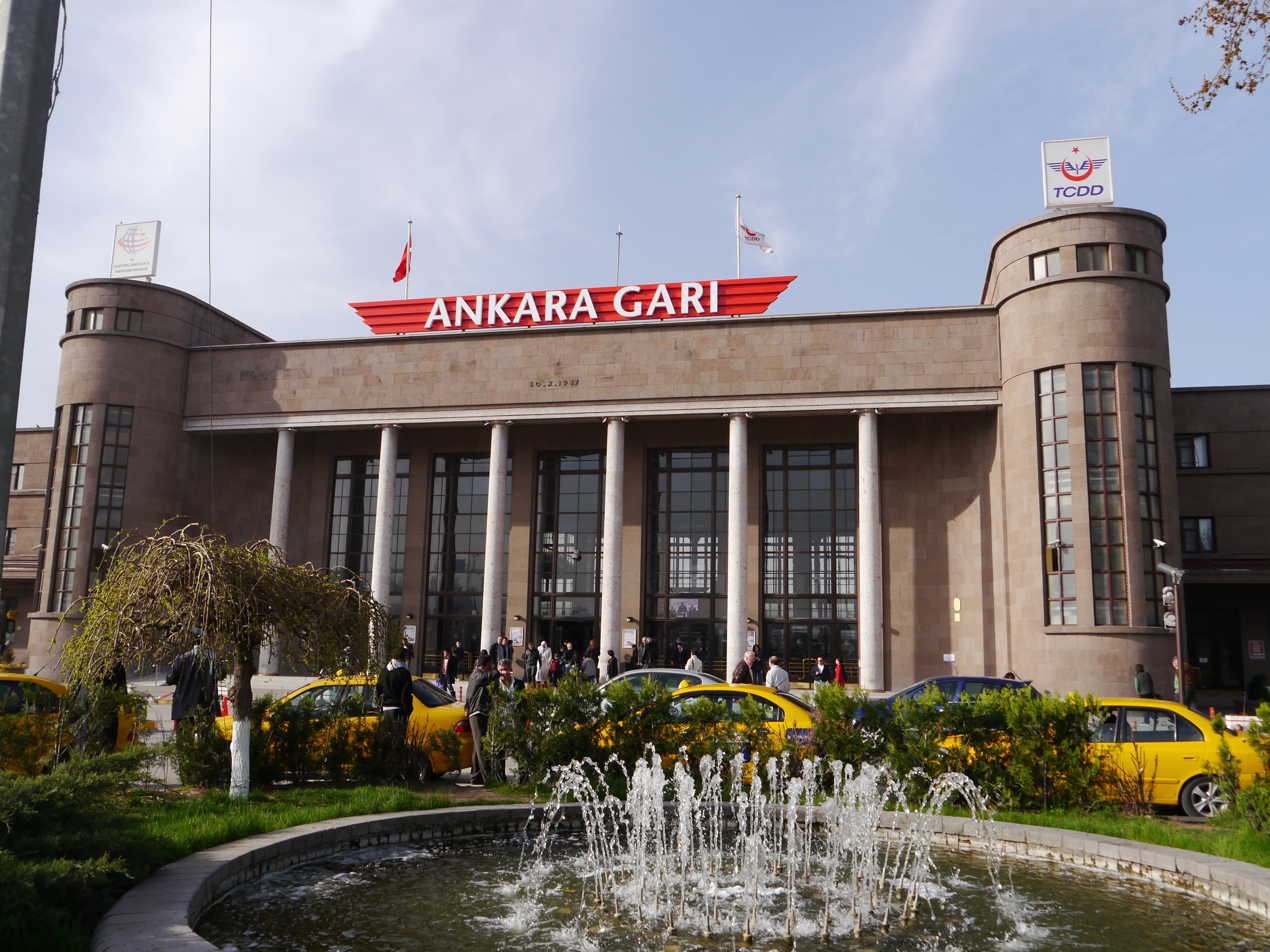
Designed by Şekip Akalın, Ankara Central Station (1937) is a notable art deco design of its era.

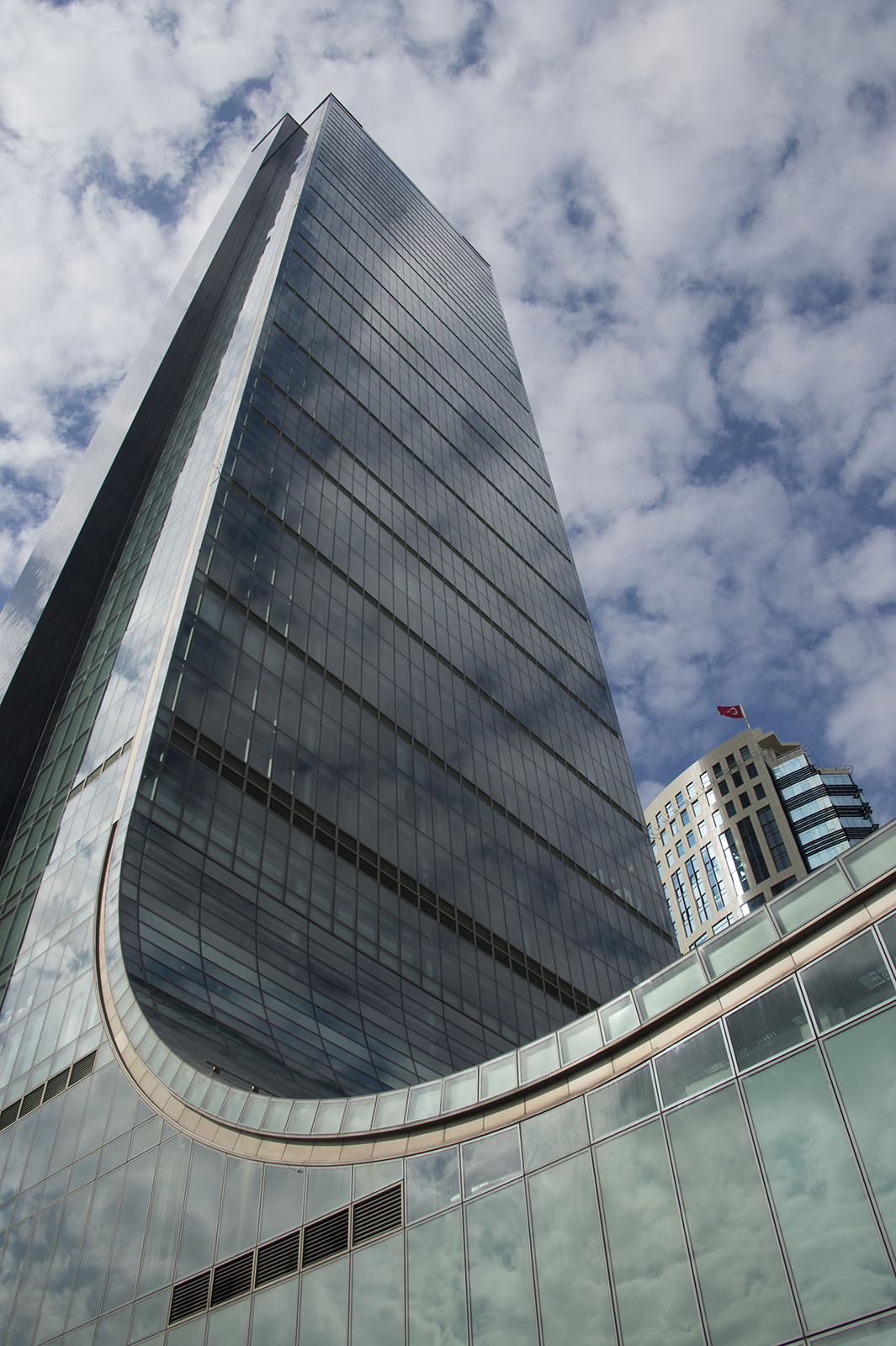
Istanbul Sapphire (2006–11) is the tallest building in Turkey and 4th in Europe.

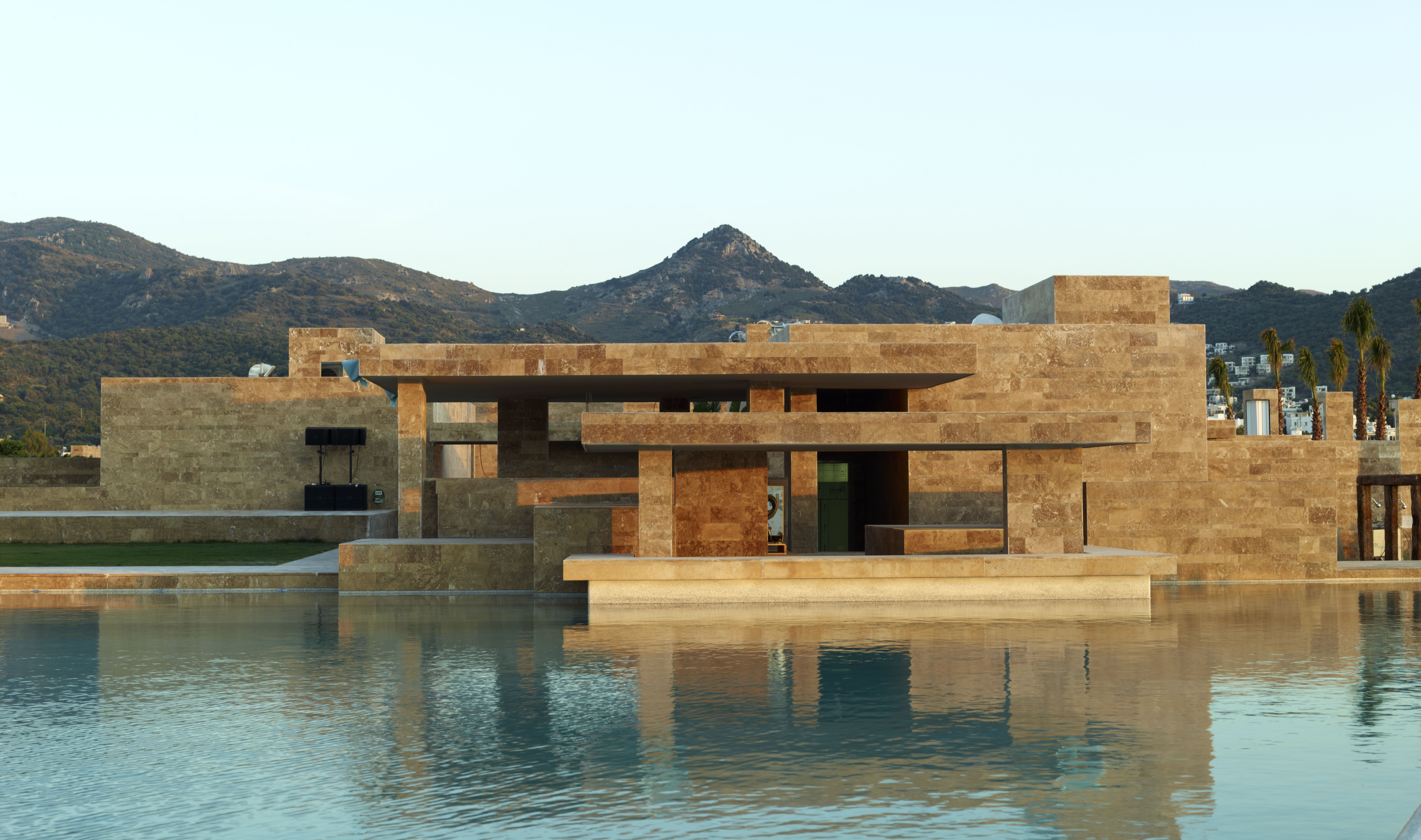
Yalikavak Palmarina in Bodrum (2014) designed by Emre Arolat

=== Performing arts ===
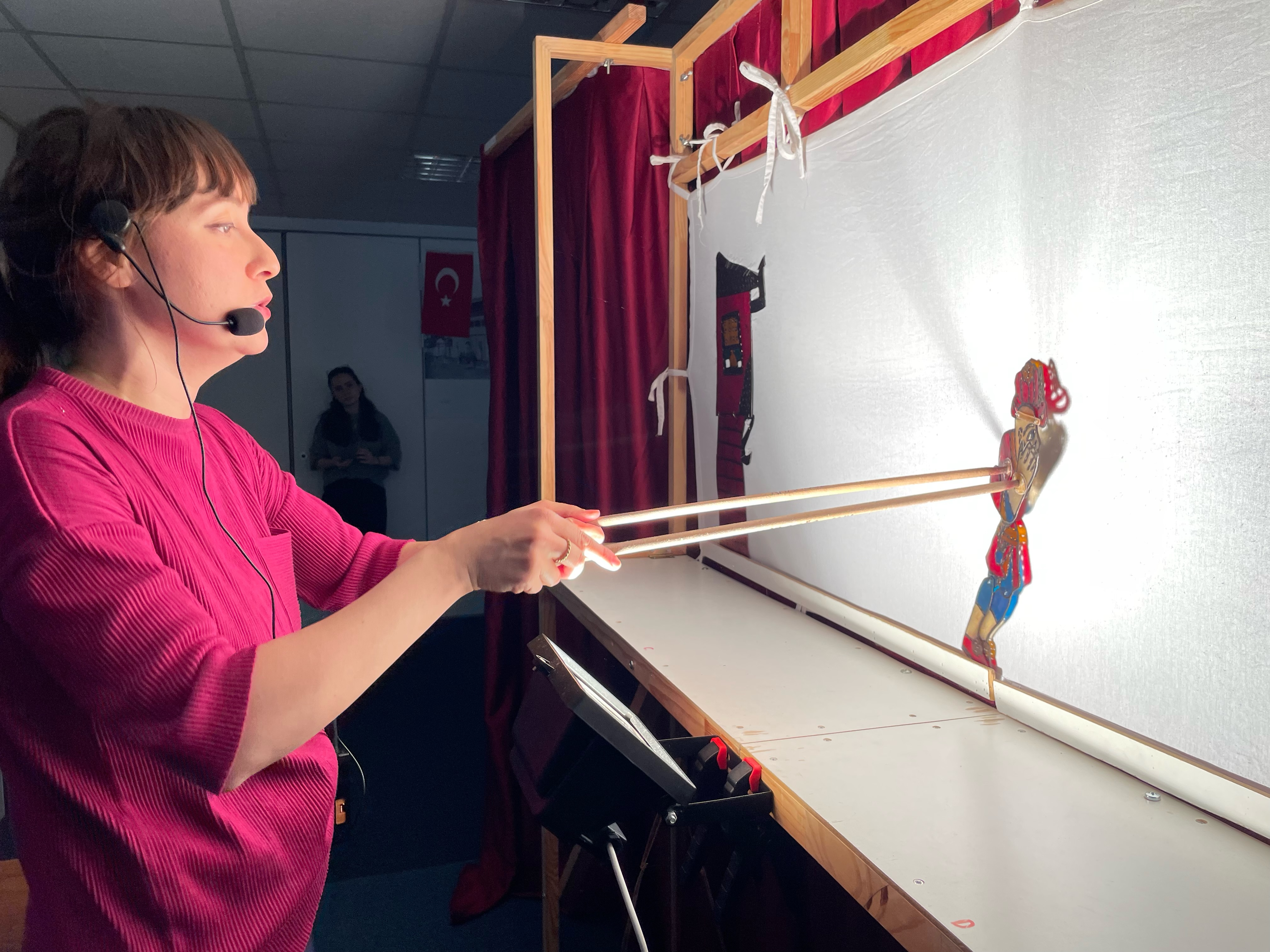
Karagöz and Hacivat are the lead characters of Turkish shadow play, popularized during the Ottoman period.

The performing arts in Turkey encompass traditional forms like shadow puppetry (Karagöz and Hacivat), dances, stand-up/storytellers - meddahs, as well as opera, contemporary theater and cinema. Turkish films and television series have gained international acclaim, contributing to the country's cultural export.

== Music and media ==
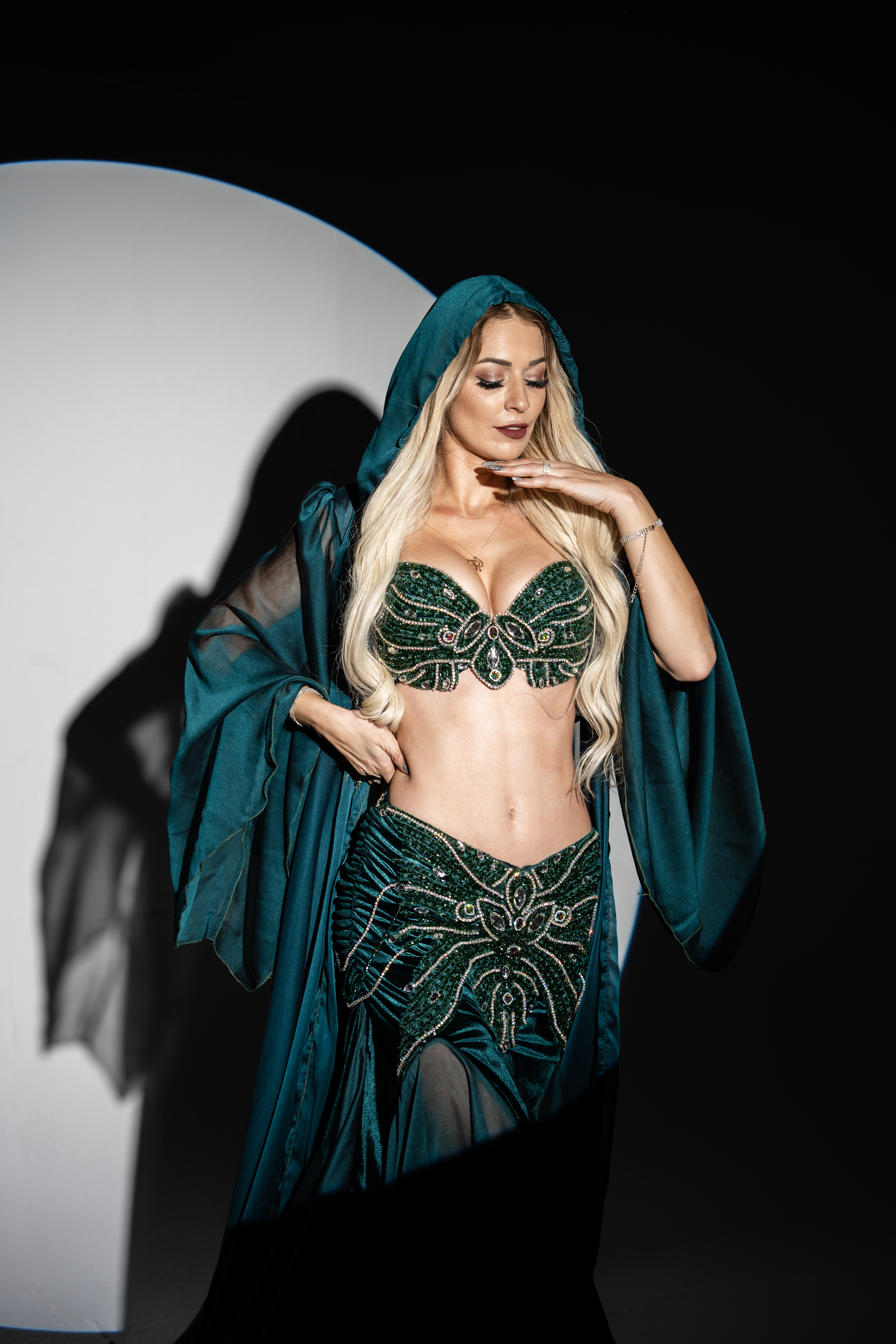
A Turkish belly dancer

=== Music traditions ===
Turkish music is characterized by a blend of Central Asian, Middle Eastern, and Balkan influences. Although classifying genres of Turkish music can be problematic, three broad categories can be considered. These are "Turkish folk music", "Turkish art music", and international music styles.

The 80s saw rock music establishing itself in Turkey, mainly spearheaded by Anatolian rock. In the 90s, the resurging popularity of pop music gave rise to several international Turkish pop stars. Another main genre was arabesque during that era. Early 2000s has seen the rap music scene shining while 2010s was a hotspot for alternative and indie music with the help of so-called Üçüncü yeniler. The 2020s introduced electronic music artists rising in popularity, following the international trend.

=== Media and cinema ===
Turkey's media landscape is diverse but has faced challenges regarding press freedom. Social media platforms have become significant channels for public discourse, especially among younger populations. However, government regulations and censorship have raised concerns about media independence. Turkish television dramas have achieved global popularity, known for their emotional storytelling and high production values. Research indicates that their narrative structures and emotional arcs contribute to their international appeal.

Turkish film directors have won numerous prestigious awards in the recent years. Nuri Bilge Ceylan won the Best Director Award at the 2008 Cannes Film Festival with the film Üç Maymun. This was the fourth time that Ceylan received an award at Cannes, following the awards for the film Uzak (which was also nominated for the Golden Palm) at the festival of 2003 and 2004, and the film İklimler (also nominated for the Golden Palm) at the 2006 Cannes Film Festival. These three films, along with the other important works of Ceylan such as Kasaba (1997) and Mayıs sıkıntısı (1999) have also won awards at the other major international film festivals; including the Angers European First Film Festival (1997 and 1999), Ankara Film Festival (2000), Antalya Golden Orange Film Festival (1999, 2002 and 2006), Bergamo Film Meeting (2001), Berlin Film Festival (1998), Brothers Manaki Film Festival (2003), Buenos Aires International Festival of Independent Cinema (2001), Cannes Film Festival (2003, 2004 and 2006), Chicago Film Festival (2003), Cinemanila Film Festival (2003), European Film Awards (2000), Istanbul Film Festival (1998, 2000, 2003 and 2007), Mexico City Film Festival (2004), Montpellier Mediterranean Film Festival (2003), San Sebastián Film Festival (2003), Singapore Film Festival (2001), Sofia Film Festival (2004), Tokyo Film Festival (1998) and the Trieste Film Festival (2004).

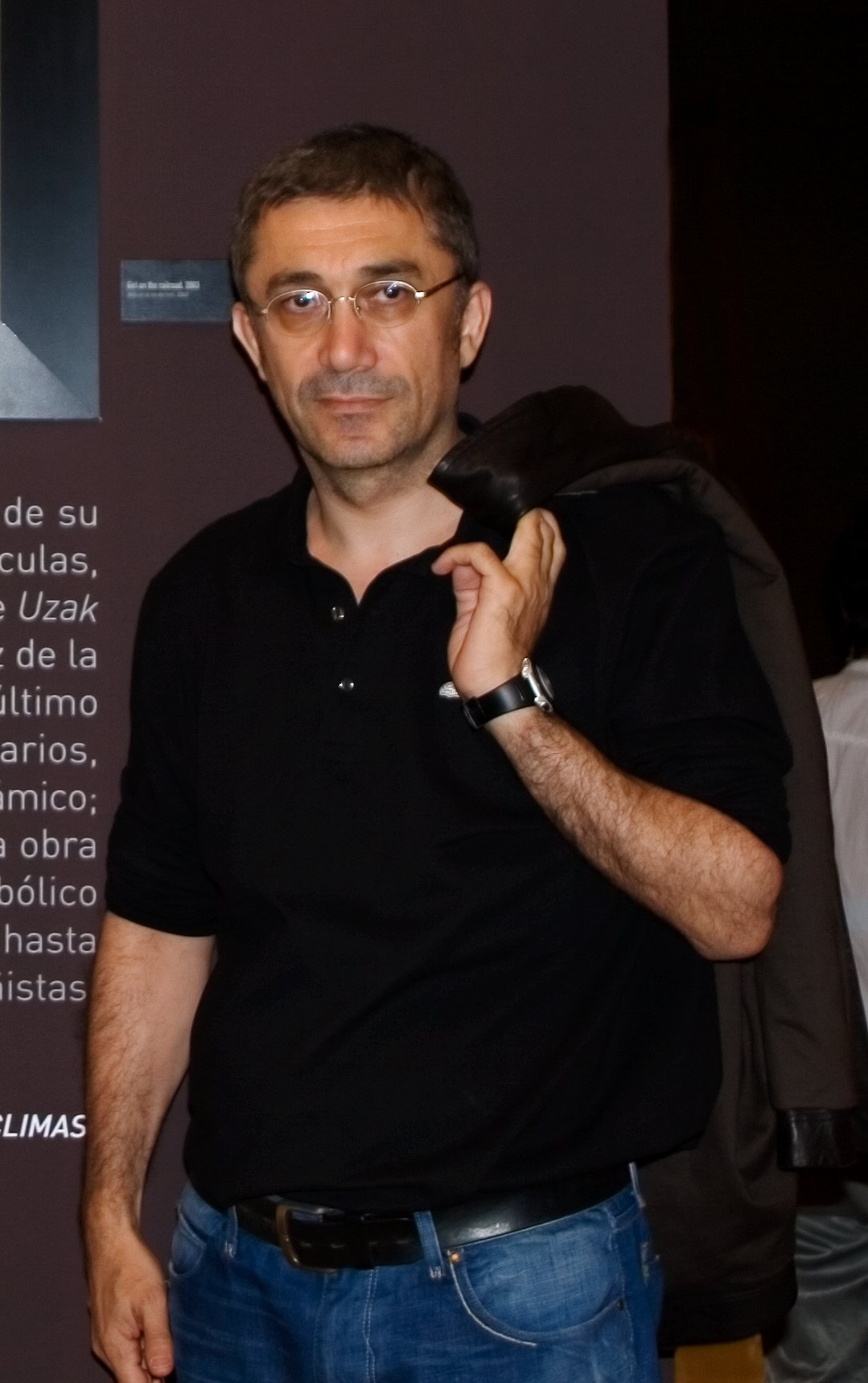
Nuri Bilge Ceylan

More recently, Semih Kaplanoğlu won the Golden Bear at the 60th Berlin International Film Festival with his Honey (2010 film); the third and final installment of the "Yusuf Trilogy", which includes Egg and Milk. This was the second time a Turkish film wins the award; first one being Susuz Yaz by Metin Erksan in 1964.

Turkish film director Fatih Akın, who lives in Germany and has dual Turkish-German citizenship, won the Golden Bear Award at the 2004 Berlin Film Festival with the film Head-On. The film won numerous other awards in many international film festivals. Fatih Akın was nominated for the Golden Palm and won the Best Screenplay Award at the 2007 Cannes Film Festival; as well as the Golden Orange at the 2007 Antalya Film Festival; the Lino Brocka Award at the 2007 Cinemanila Film Festival; the Best Screenwriter award at the 2007 European Film Awards; the Best Direction, Best Screenplay and Outstanding Feature Film awards at the 2008 German Film Awards; the Best Feature Film and Best Screenplay awards at the 2008 RiverRun Film Festival; the 2008 Bavarian Film Award; and the Lux Prize by the European Parliament, with the film The Edge of Heaven. Other important films of Akın, such as Kurz und schmerzlos (1998), In July (2000), Solino (2002), and Crossing the Bridge: The Sound of Istanbul (2005) won numerous awards.

Another famous Turkish film director is Ferzan Özpetek, whose films like Hamam (1997), Harem Suare (1999), The Ignorant Fairies (2001), Facing Windows (2003), 'Sacred Heart (2005) and Saturn in Opposition (2007) won him international fame and awards. The film Facing Windows (2003) was particularly successful, winning the Best Film and Scholars Jury awards at the 2003 David di Donatello Awards, the Crystal Globe and Best Director awards at the 2003 Karlovy Vary International Film Festival, the 2003 Silver Ribbon for Best Original Story from the Italian National Syndicate of Film Journalists, the Festival Prize at the 2004 Foyle Film Festival, the Audience Award at the 2004 Rehoboth Beach Independent Film Festival, and the Canvas Audience Award at the 2004 Flanders International Film Festival.

== Cuisine ==
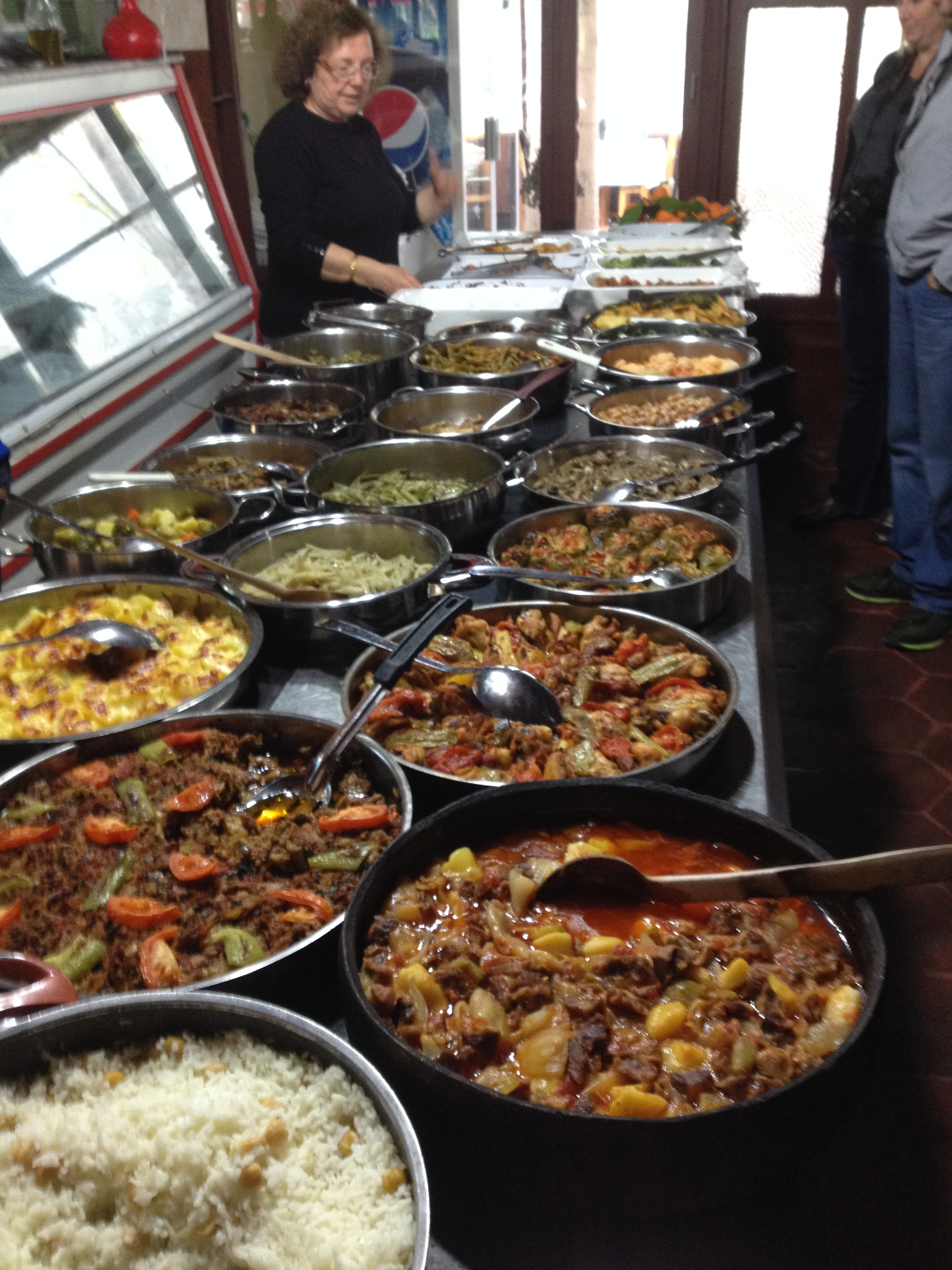
Selection of Turkish food

Turkish cuisine has been influenced by Balkan, Central Asian, Mediterranean and Middle Eastern cuisines.

Food plays a central role in Turkish social life, with customs such as sharing tea or coffee forming key aspects of hospitality. Meals are often family-centered, and guests are traditionally offered food or drink as a sign of respect and generosity. Turkish tea (çay), coffee (kahve) and rakı (a unique alcoholic beverage) hold cultural significance beyond their culinary value, often associated with ritual, conversation, and social bonding.

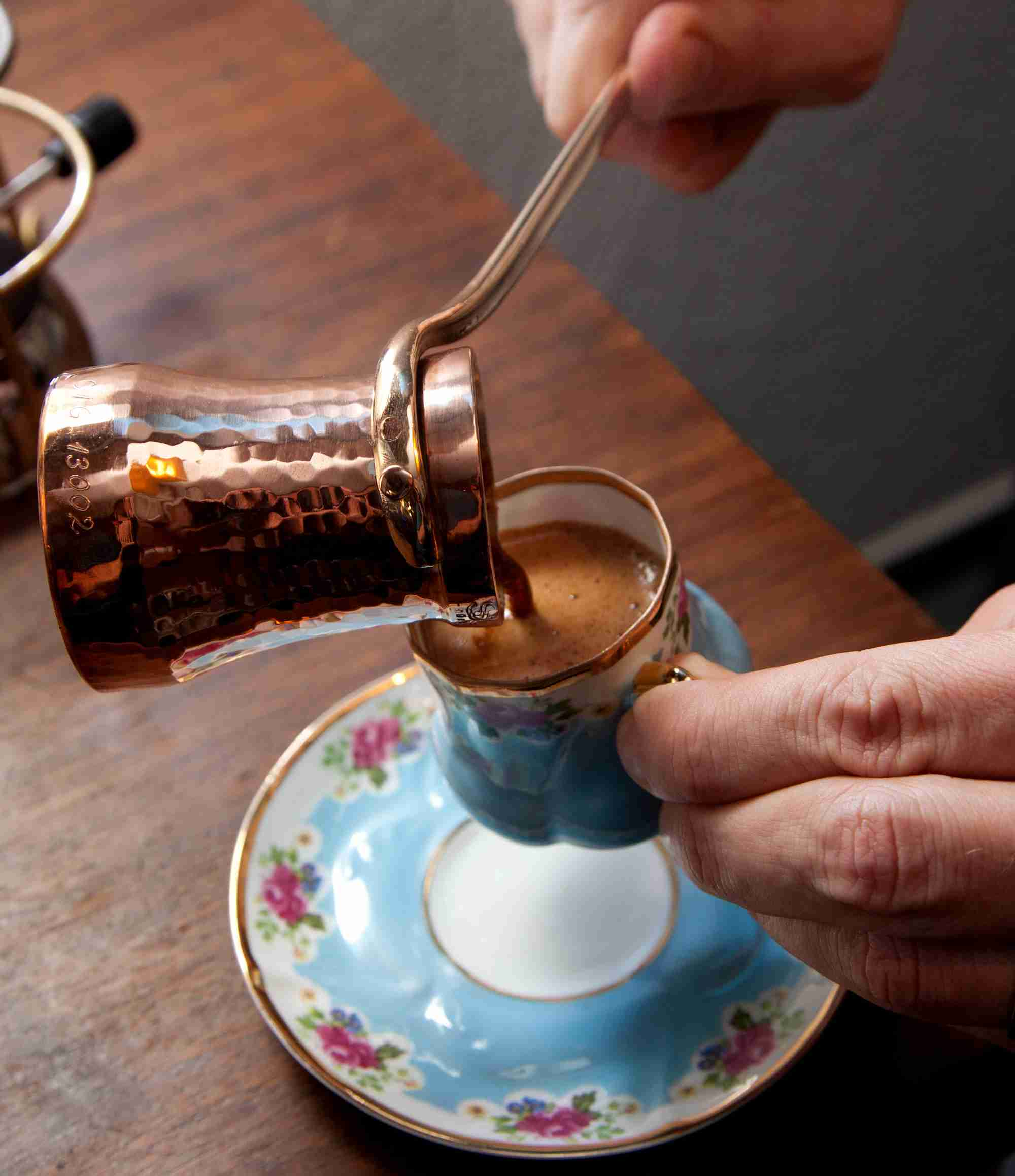
Turkish coffee

Taken as a whole, Turkish cuisine is not homogenous. Aside from common Turkish specialities which can be found throughout the country, there are also region-specific specialities. The cuisines of the Aegean, Marmara and Mediterranean regions display basic characteristics of Mediterranean cuisine as they are rich in vegetables, herbs and fish. Especially in the western parts of Turkey, where olive trees are grown abundantly, vegetable dishes with olive oil - ladera - mezes are popular. The Black Sea region's cuisine (northern Turkey) is mostly based on corn and anchovies. Central Anatolia is famous for its pastry specialities such as keşkek, mantı (especially of Kayseri) and gözleme. The Southeastern Anatolia is famous for its kebabs and dough-based desserts such as baklava, kadayıf and künefe. Eastern Anatolia is known for its soups.

The name of specialities sometimes includes the name of a city or a region (either in Turkey or outside). This suggests that a dish is a speciality of that area, or may refer to the specific technique or ingredients used in that area. For example, the difference between Urfa kebab and Adana kebab is the use of garlic instead of onion and the larger amount of Aleppo pepper that kebab contains.

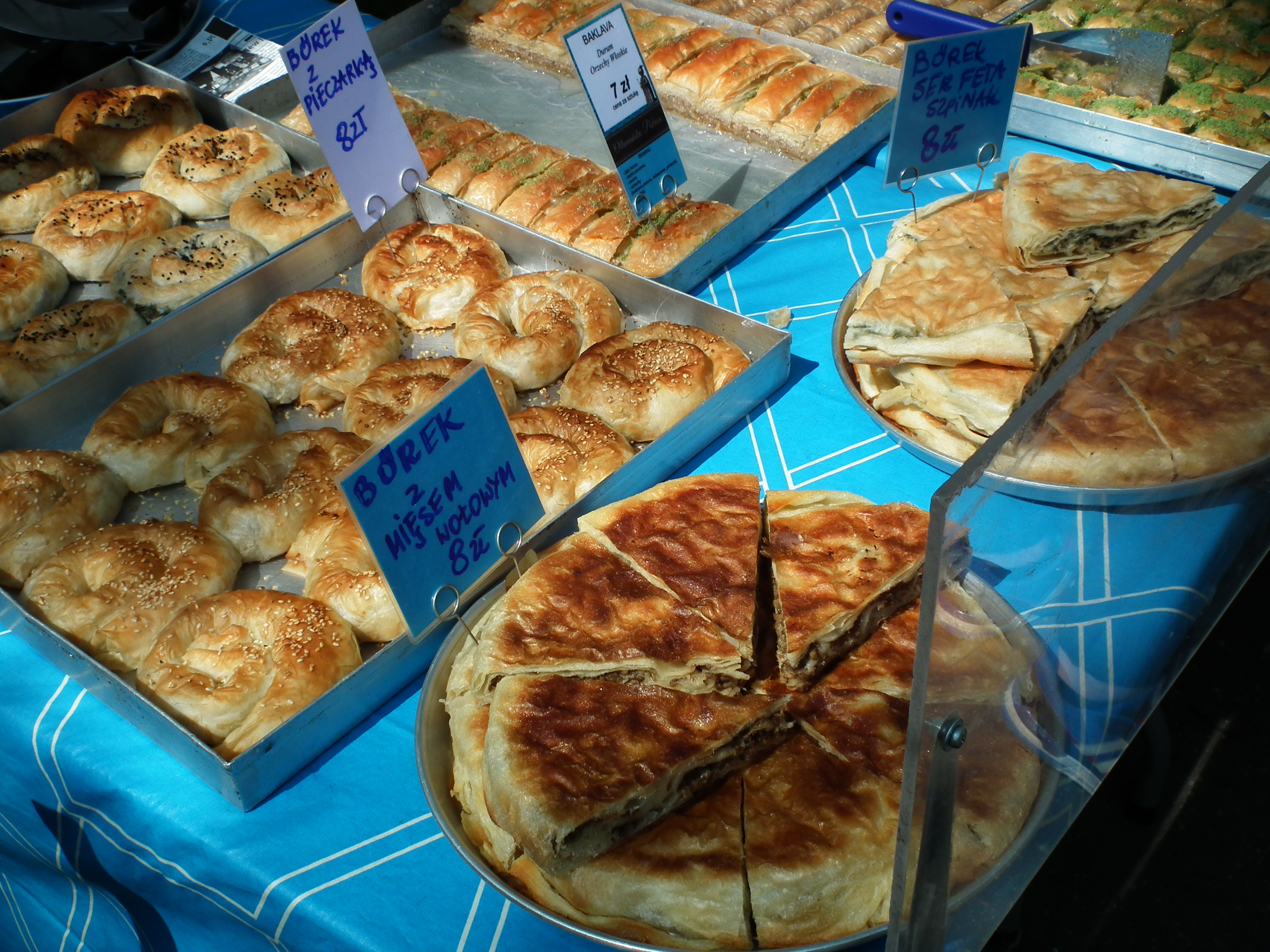
Börek and Baklava

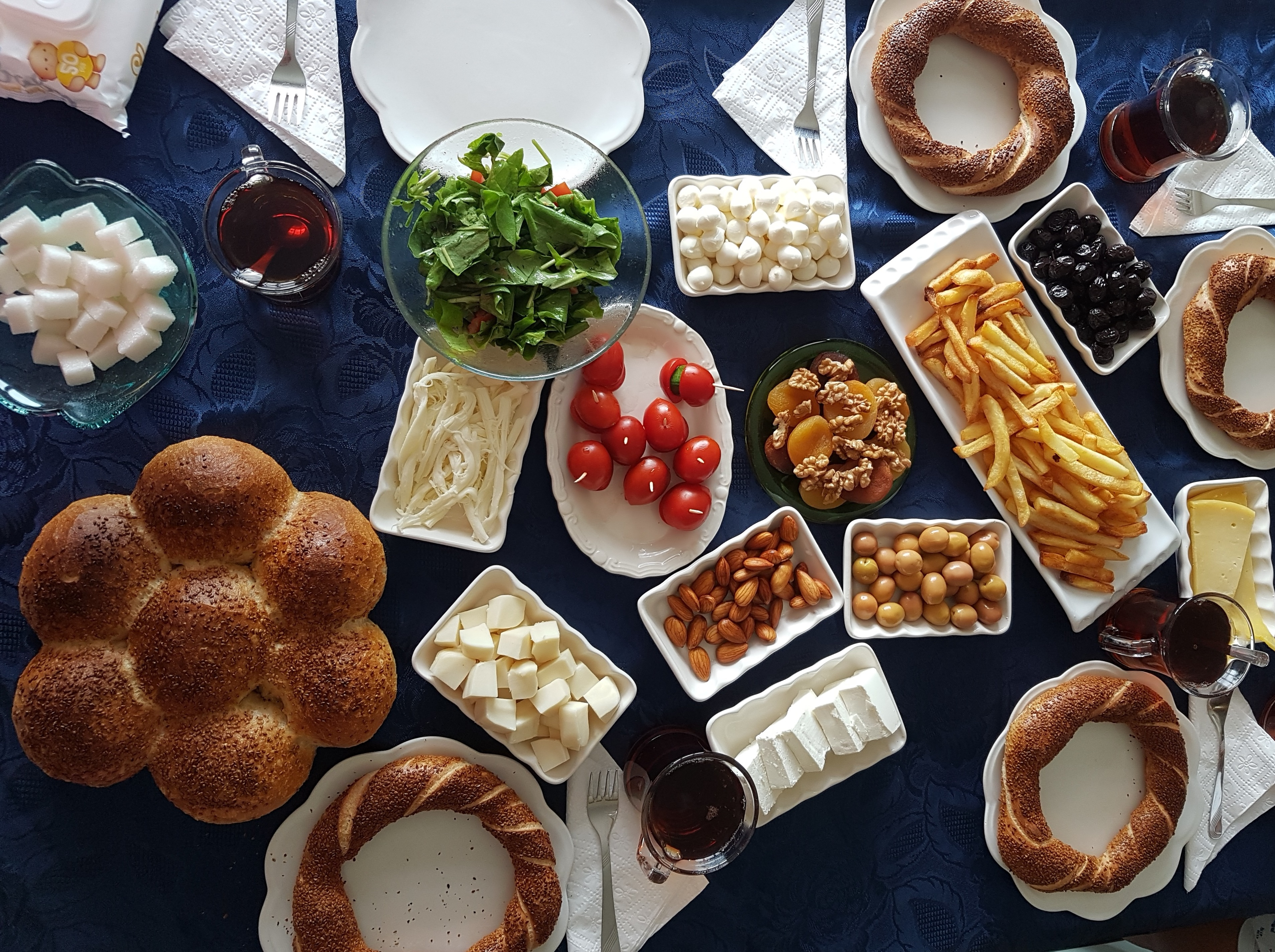
Turkish breakfast, including Simit and Turkish tea

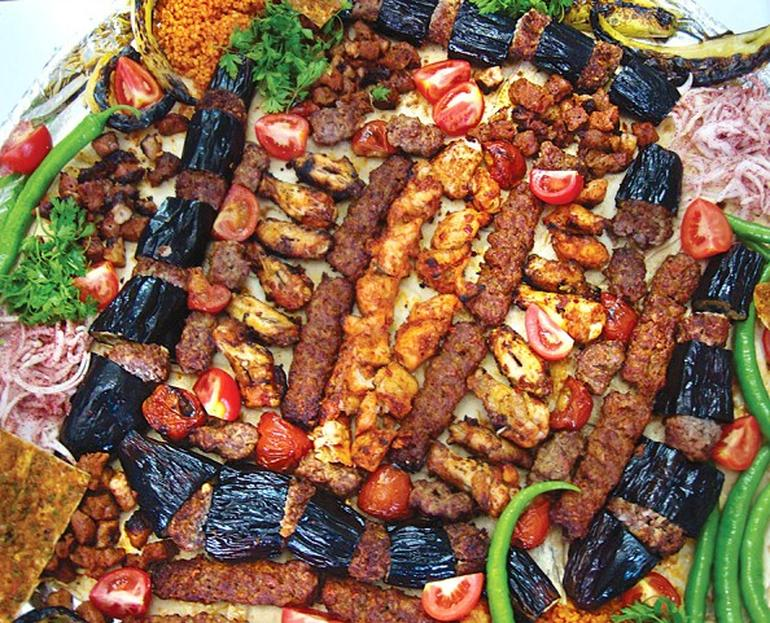
Variety of kebabs, including şiş kebap and adana kebap

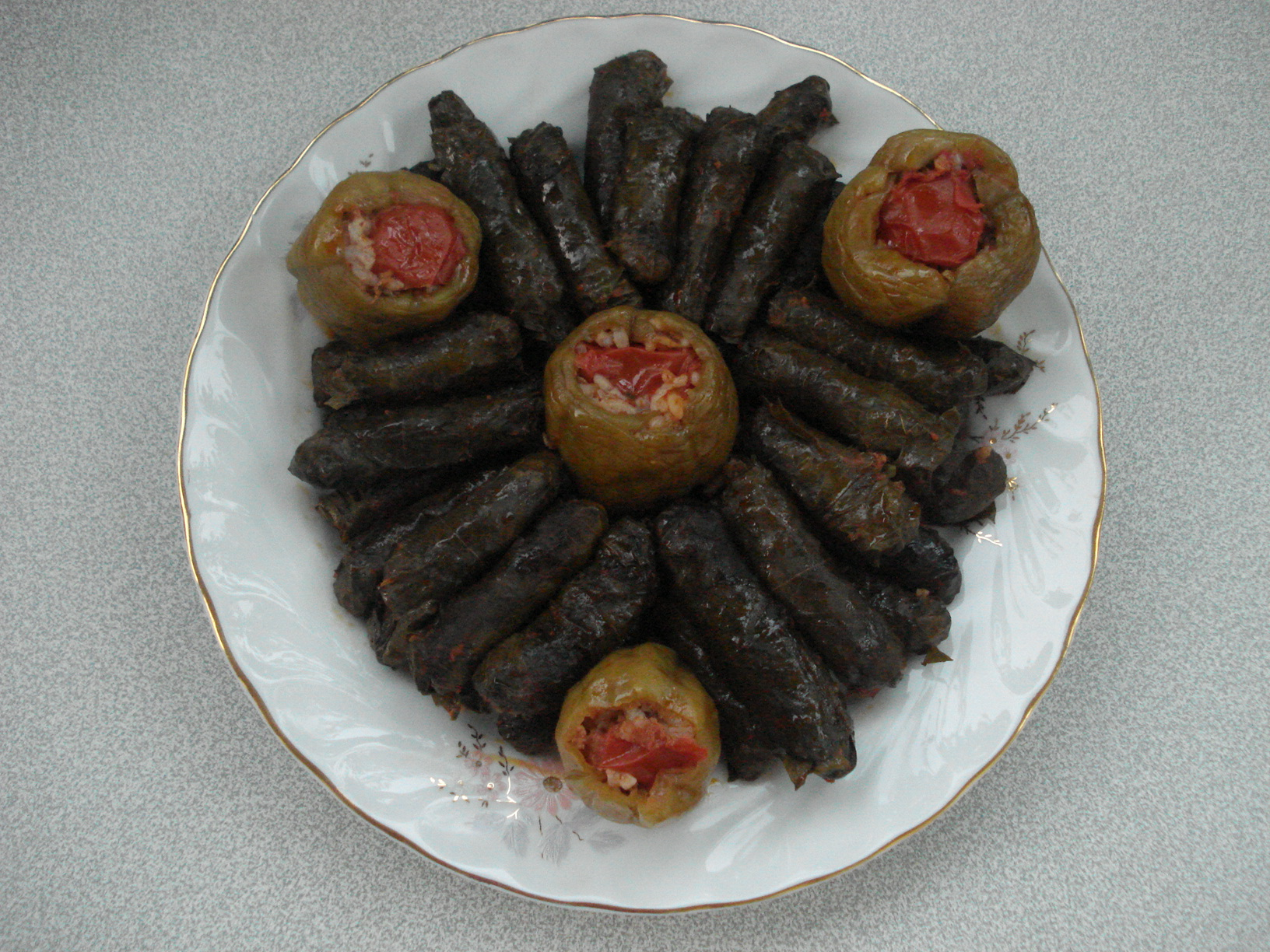
Dolma and sarma

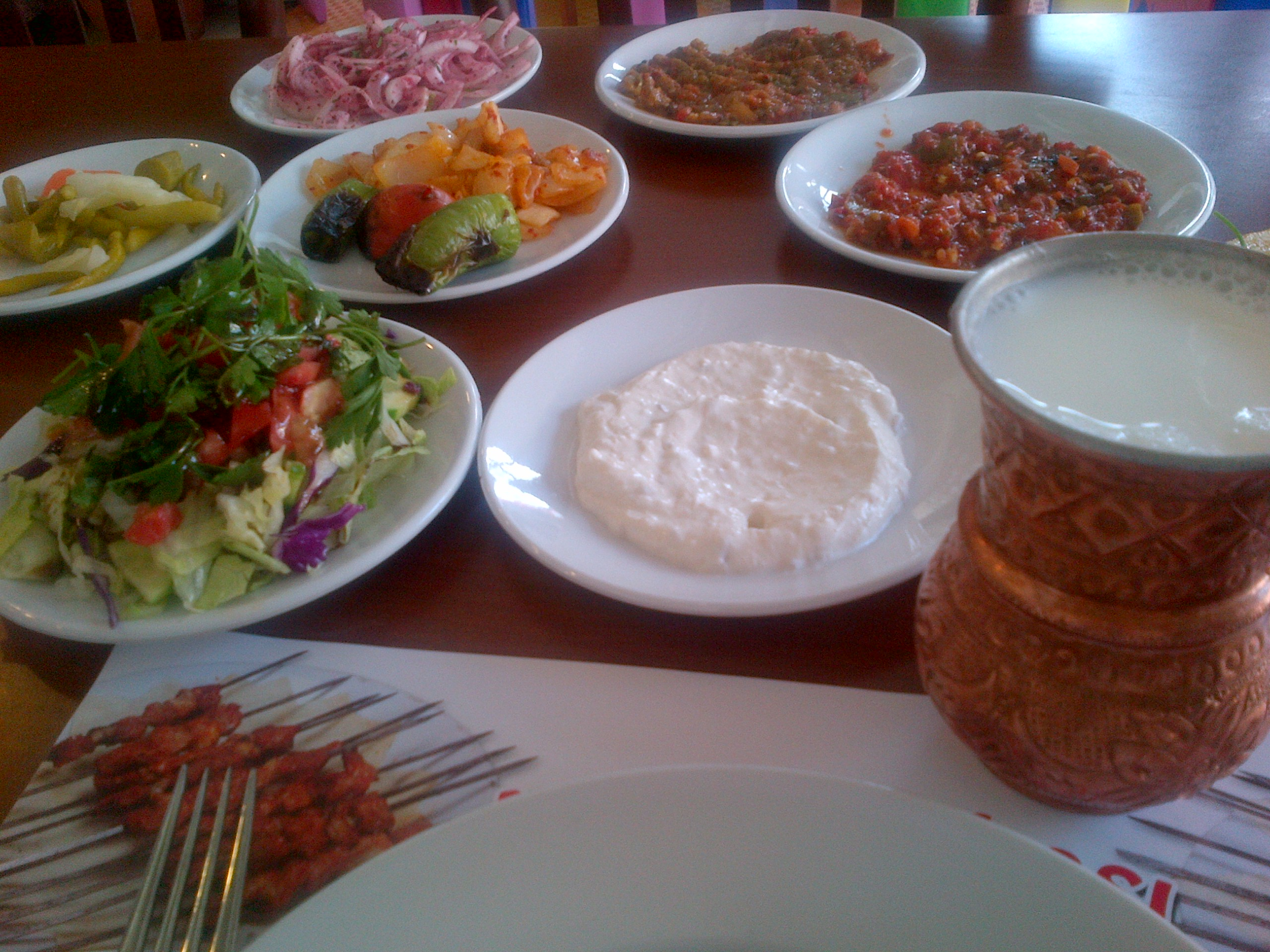
Mezes with Ayran

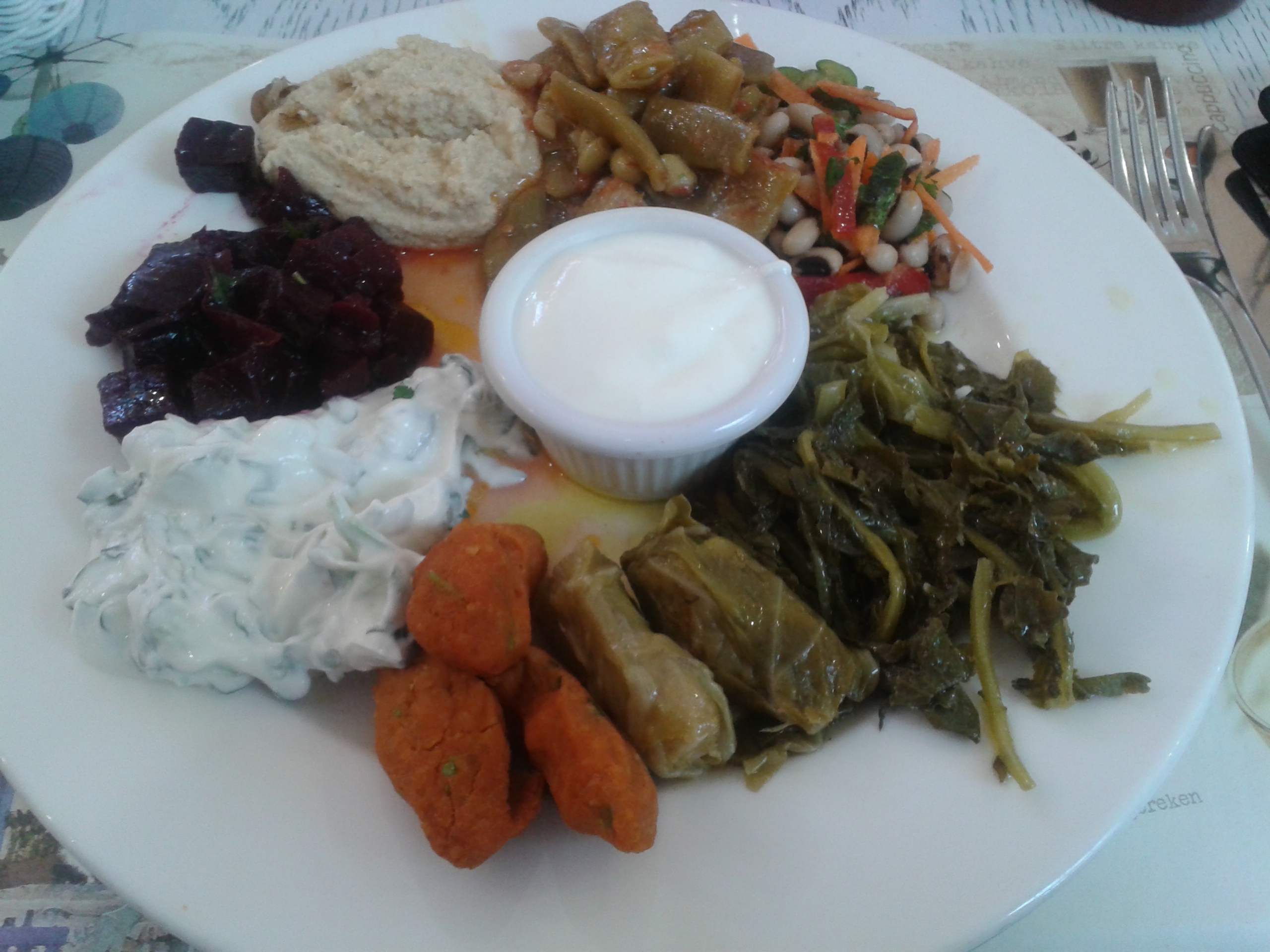
Turkish vegetarian food, zeytinyağlı

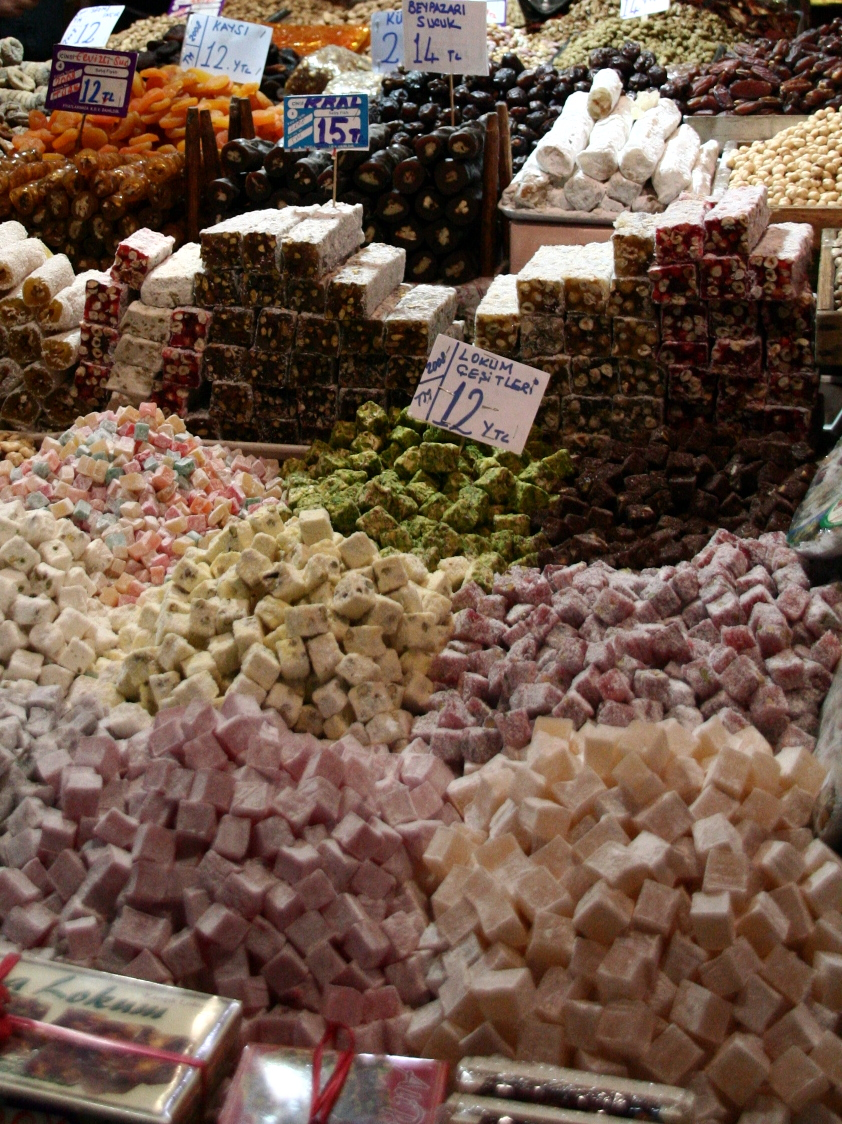
Turkish delight

== Traditions and daily life ==
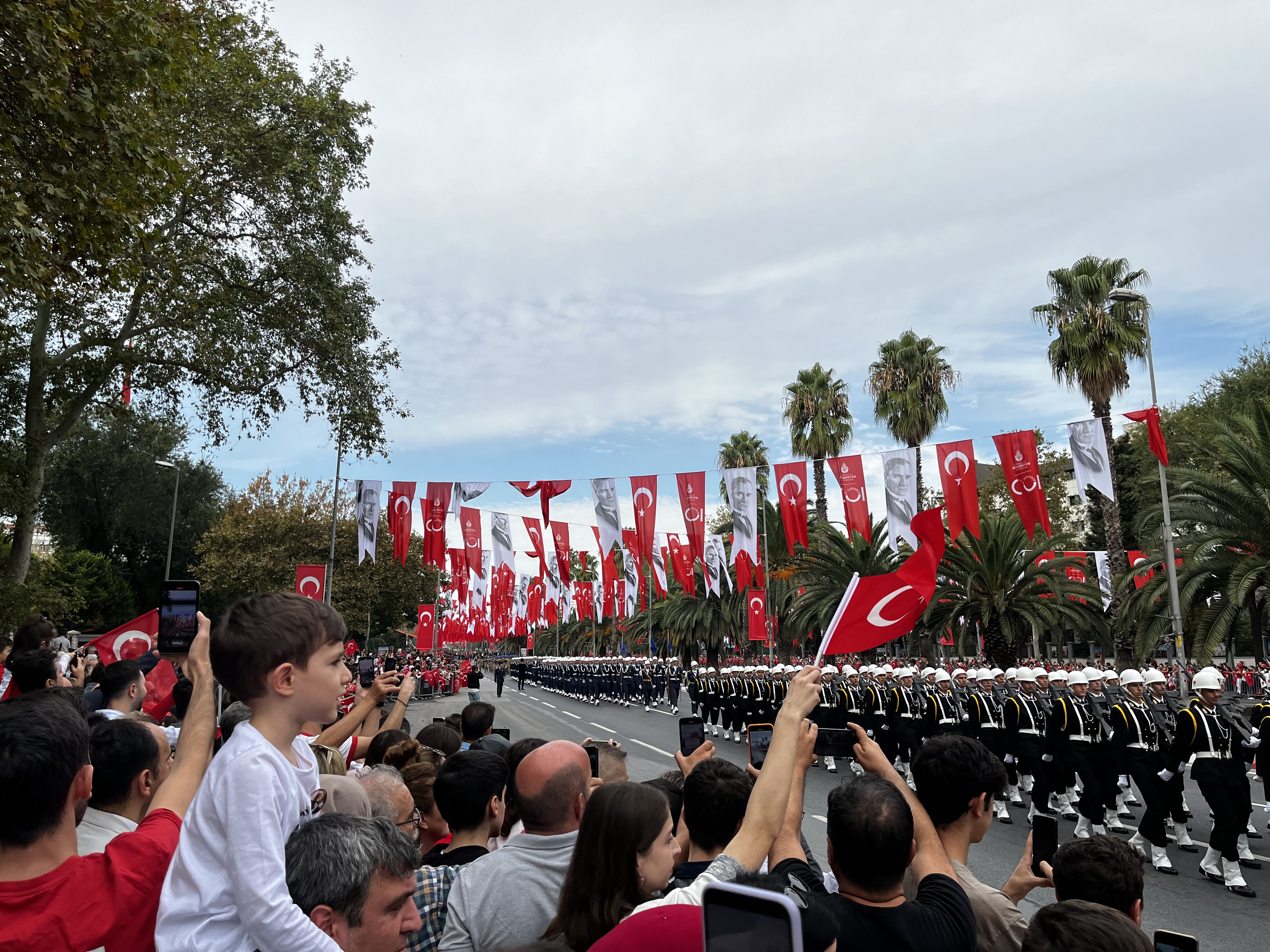
100th year anniversary in Republic Day

=== Holidays and festivals ===
Turkey observes a mix of national, secular, and religious holidays. National holidays, such as Republic Day (October 29), celebrate historical milestones, while religious holidays like Ramadan Bayram (Eid al-Fitr) and Kurban Bayram (Eid al-Adha) are widely observed with family gatherings and communal meals. Public celebrations often include parades, folk performances, and ceremonies.

Christmas is known in Turkish as Noel, although the majority of the Turks do not celebrate it as such, the idea is not thoroughly an alien one. The festivity traces its roots where Santa Claus was born in Turkey and is known as Noel Baba. It has for a long time been a tradition that Noel Baba would bring gifts to children on New Year's Eve. Easter or Paskalya was also fused into society in some regions, although not directly.

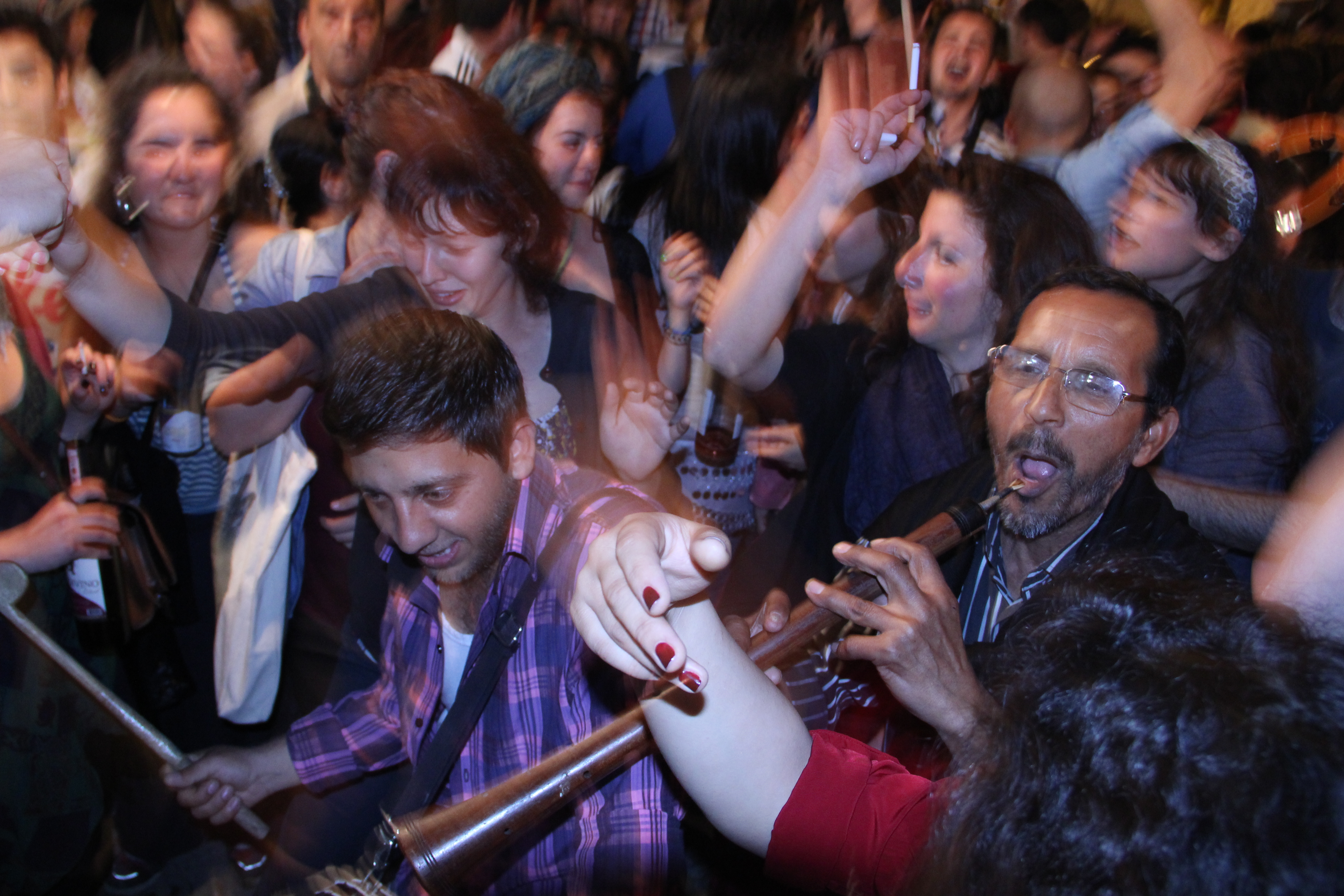
Hıdırellez celebrations

One of the other common celebrations in Turkey is Nowruz. This celebration is done on the pretext of the beginning of spring and the beginning of the new year. The establishment of Nowruz has a long history, so much so that it has been celebrated in different parts of Central Asia for the past three thousand years, especially in the Middle East. In different parts of Turkey, especially the Kurdish regions of this country, Nowruz is considered one of the most important cultural and historical traditions of these regions. Lighting a fire, wearing new clothes, holding a dance ceremony, and giving gifts to each other are some of the activities that are done in this celebration. Another well received festival is Hıdırellez, which is also observed widely in the Balkans.

=== Customs and rituals ===
Life-cycle rituals—birth, marriage, and death—are marked by various traditional practices. Weddings, in particular, are elaborate events that may span several days, involving music, dancing, and symbolic customs such as henna nights (kına gecesi). Funerals typically follow Islamic customs, with community involvement in mourning and remembrance.

=== Folk culture ===
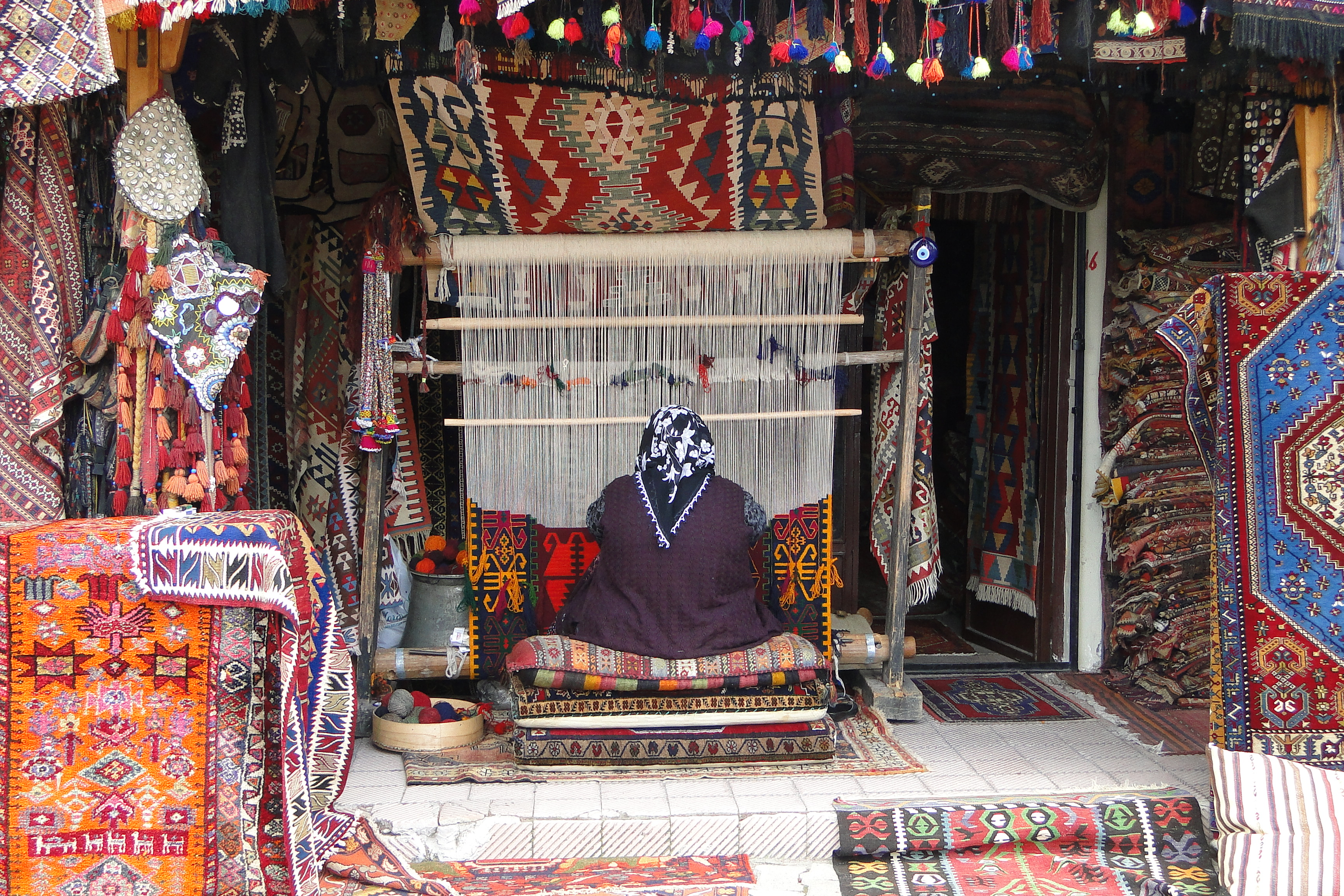
A lady handweaves a carpet in Cappadocia

Folk traditions persist in rural areas and include oral storytelling, music, dances, and handicrafts. Regional clothing, embroidery, and carpet weaving reflect local identities and histories. Folk dances such as the zeybek (Aegean region) or horon (Black Sea) are performed during festivals and communal events, serving as expressions of cultural heritage.

Carpet (halı) and tapestry (kilim) weaving is a traditional Turkish art form with roots in pre-Islamic times. During its long history, the art and craft of weaving carpets and tapestries in Turkey has integrated numerous cultural traditions. Apart from the Turkic design patterns that are prevalent, traces of Persian and Byzantine patterns can also be detected. There are also similarities with the patterns used in Armenian, Caucasian and Kurdish carpet designs. The arrival of Islam in Central Asia and the development of Islamic art also influenced Turkic patterns in the medieval period. The history of the designs, motifs and ornaments used in Turkish carpets and tapestries thus reflects the political and ethnic history of the Turks and the cultural diversity of Anatolia. However, scientific attempts were unsuccessful, as yet, to attribute a particular design to a specific ethnic, regional, or even nomadic versus village tradition.

== Education and science ==
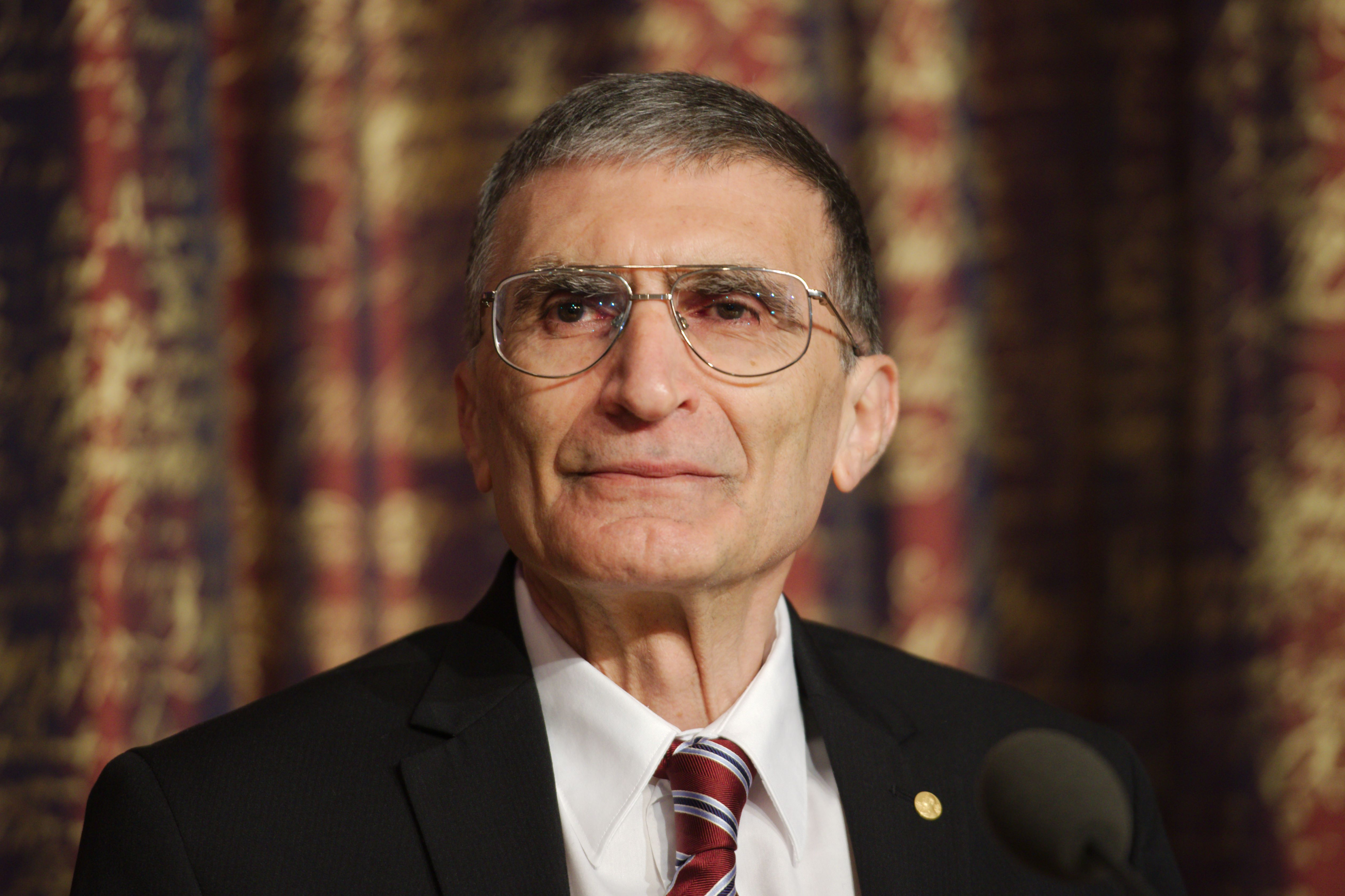
Aziz Sancar was awarded the Nobel Prize in Chemistry

=== Education ===
Turkey has a centralized education system, with compulsory education lasting 12 years. Higher education has expanded significantly since the 1980s, with the emergence of numerous private and public universities. Despite improvements, disparities in access to quality education persist between urban and rural areas. Istanbul University (1453) and Istanbul Technical University (1773) are among the oldest universities in continuous operation

=== Science ===
Scientific research in Turkey has expanded significantly in recent decades, particularly in fields such as engineering, biotechnology, and defense technology. The government has increased funding for research and development through institutions like TÜBİTAK (The Scientific and Technological Research Council of Türkiye), supporting innovation and international collaboration. Universities and tech parks across the country, notably in Ankara and Istanbul, serve as hubs for academic and applied research. Despite progress, challenges remain in retaining scientific talent and enhancing global competitiveness.

== Sports and recreation ==
=== Traditional sports ===
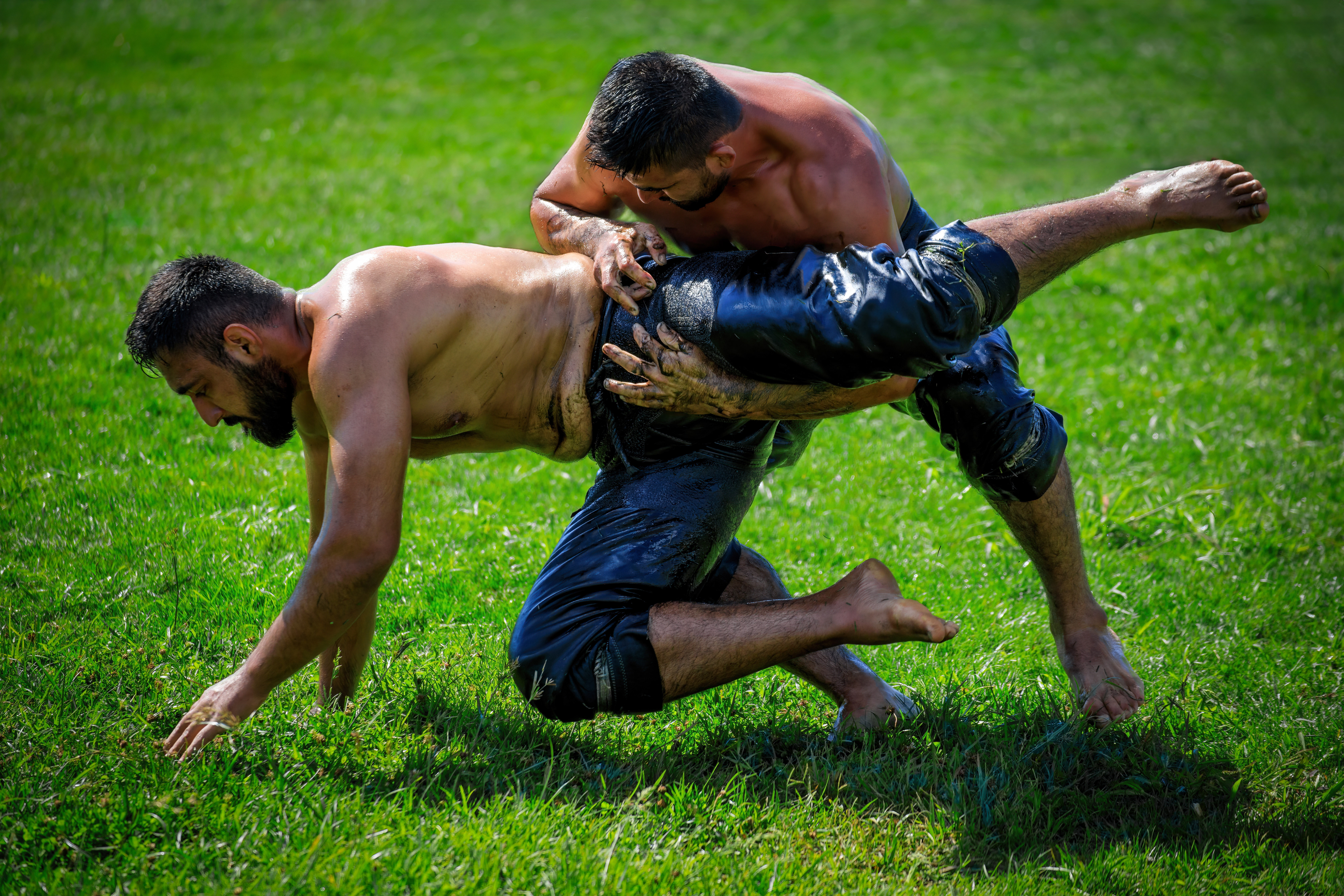
An oil wrestling tournament

Traditional Turkish sports include oil wrestling (yağlı güreş), archery, and equestrian games such as cirit. These sports, many of which date back to Central Asian Turkic tribes, are celebrated at regional festivals and cultural heritage events. Kirkpinar, the oldest oil wrestling tournament, is held annually in Edirne.

Oil wrestling (yağlı güreş) has been considered Turkey’s national sport for centuries. The Kırkpınar oil wrestling tournament, held in Kırkpınar, Edirne, is the sport’s best-known event. It is also the world’s oldest continuous continuously running sport event, having taken place every year since 1362.

=== Modern sports ===
The most popular sport in Turkey is football. Turkey's top teams include Fenerbahçe, Galatasaray and Beşiktaş. In 2000, Galatasaray cemented its role as a major European club by winning the UEFA Cup and UEFA Super Cup. Two years later the Turkey national team finished third in the 2002 FIFA World Cup held in Japan and South Korea, while in 2008 the national team reached the semi-finals of the UEFA Euro 2008 competition.

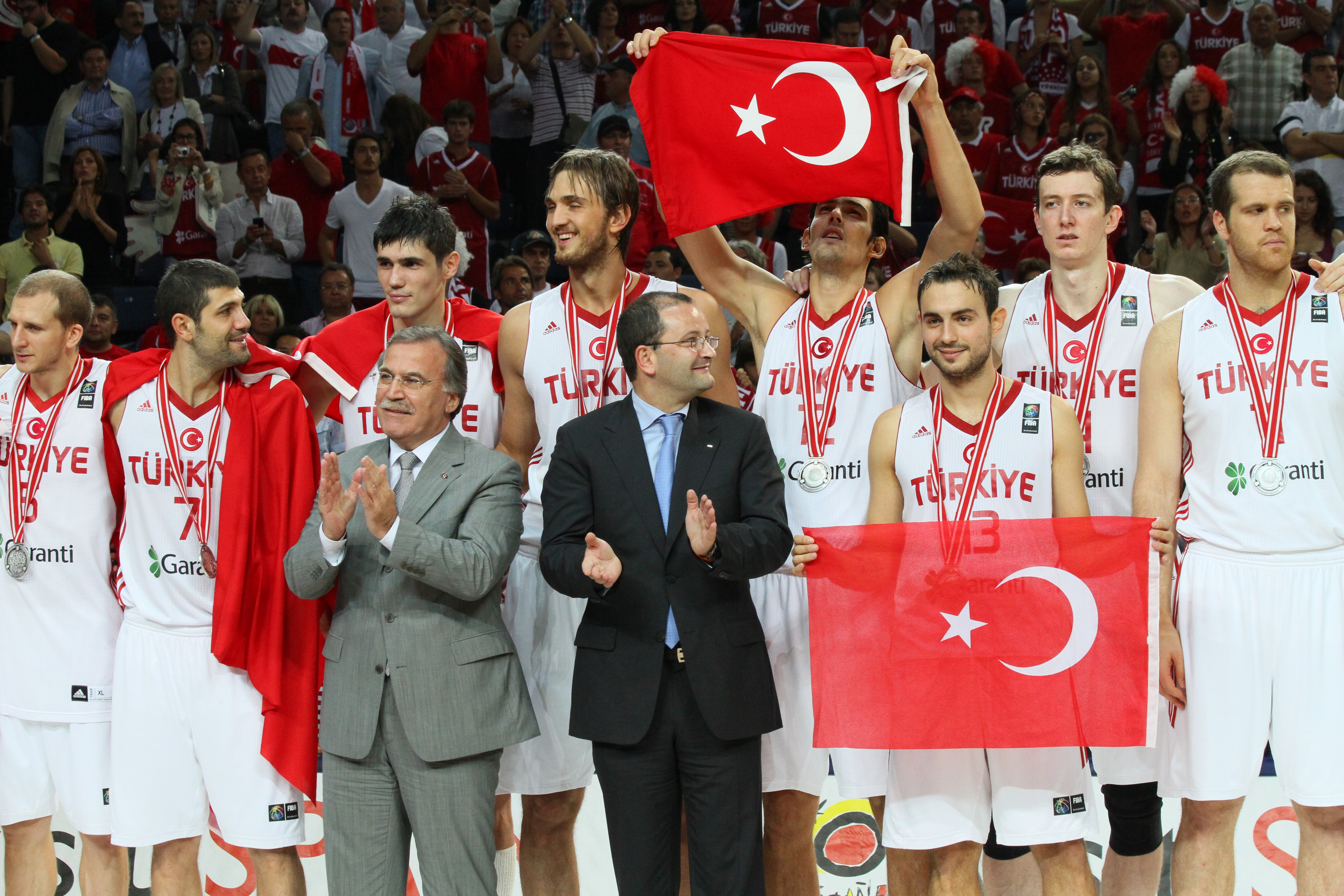
Turkish national basketball team won the silver medal in the 2010 FIBA World Championship.

Other mainstream sports such as basketball and volleyball are also popular. Turkey hosted the 2010 FIBA World Championship international basketball tournament and reached the final. The men's national basketball team finished second in Eurobasket 2001; while Efes Pilsen S.K. won the Korać Cup in 1996, finished second in the Saporta Cup of 1993, and made it to the Final Four of Euroleague and Suproleague in 2000 and 2001. Turkish basketball players have also been successful in the NBA. In June 2004, Mehmet Okur won the 2004 NBA Championship with the Detroit Pistons, becoming the first Turkish player to win an NBA title. Okur was selected to the Western Conference All-Star Team for the 2007 NBA All-Star Game, also becoming the first Turkish player to participate in this event. Another successful Turkish player in the NBA is Hidayet Türkoğlu, who was given the NBA's Most Improved Player Award for the 2007–2008 season, on April 28, 2008. Basketball has received further attention and media coverage in the 2010s with Fenerbahce Basketball and Anadolu Efes S.K. making 6 straight Euroleague Final Four appearances combined, along with winning the Euroleague title in 2017 and 2021 respectively.

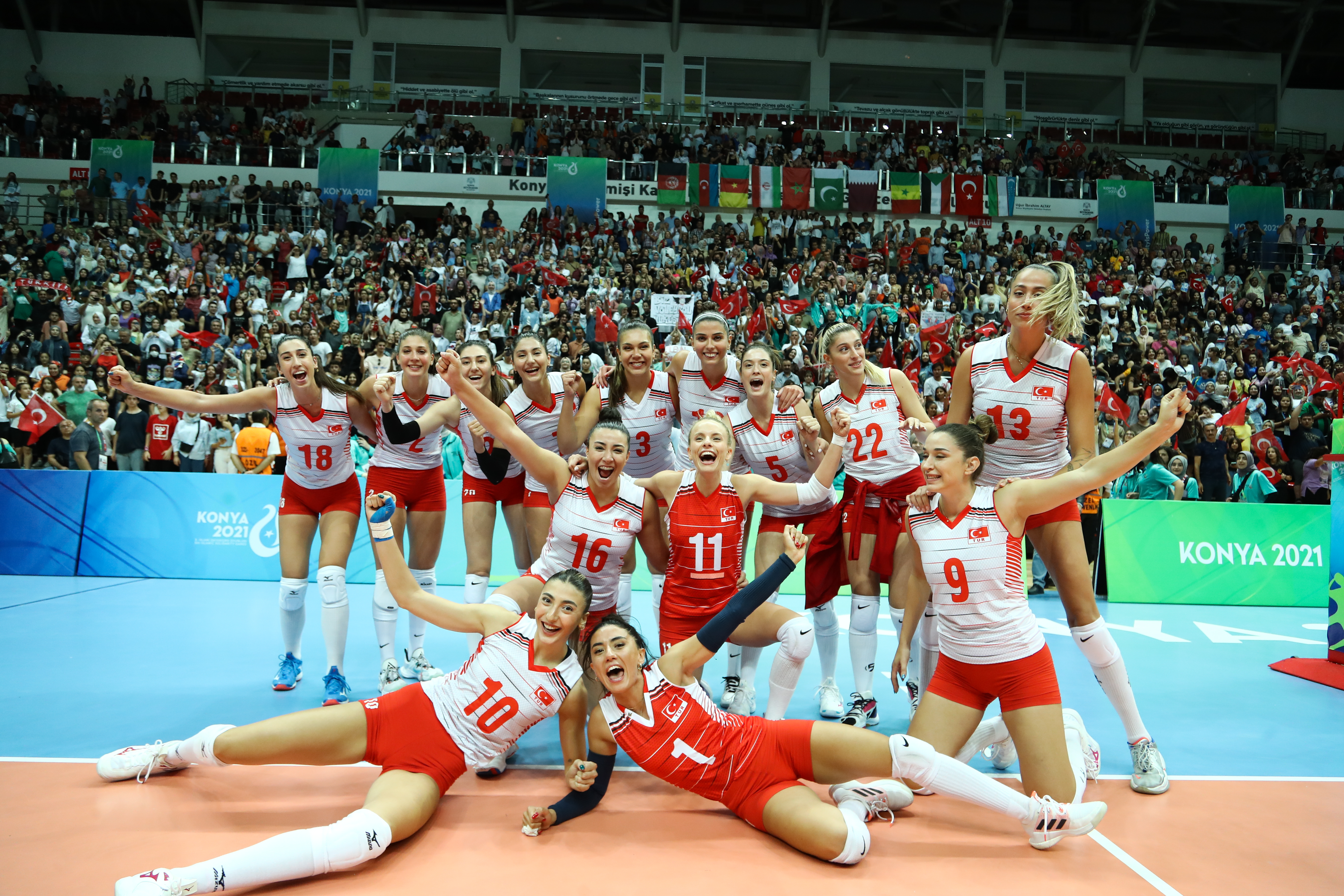
Turkey women's national volleyball team won 22 consecutive matches in 2023. In that period, they completed the Nations League, European Championship and Olympic Qualification Round / FIVB World Cup matches undefeated. Being the first team to do so in history.

Women's volleyball teams such as Eczacıbaşı, Vakıfbank, and Fenerbahçe have been the most successful by far in any team sport, winning numerous European championship titles and medals. In the 2012–13 Season, Vakıfbank İstanbul won all 52 games and reached five championship trophies Vakıfbank İstanbul won 6 games in Turkish Women's Volleyball Cup, 12 games in CEV Women's Champions League, 29 games (22 league, 7 play-off games) in Turkish Women's Volleyball League, 1 game in Turkish Women's Volleyball Super Cup and 4 games in FIVB Volleyball Women's Club World Championship, and never lost in the 2012–13 Season. In addition, they won all 51 games they played in year 2013. Having started Turkish Women's Volleyball League's 2013–14 Season with 13 wins and 2013–14 CEV Women's Champions League with 8 wins, they extended their winning streak to 73 games as of January 23, 2014.

Motorsports have become popular recently, especially following the inclusion of the Rally of Turkey to the FIA World Rally Championship calendar in 2003, and the inclusion of the Turkish Grand Prix to the Formula One racing calendar in 2005. Other important annual motorsports events which are held at the Istanbul Park racing circuit include the MotoGP Grand Prix of Turkey, the FIA World Touring Car Championship, the GP2 Series and the Le Mans Series. From time to time Istanbul and Antalya also host the Turkish leg of the F1 Powerboat Racing championship; while the Turkish leg of the Red Bull Air Race World Series, an air racing competition, takes place above the Golden Horn in Istanbul. Surfing, snowboarding, skateboarding, paragliding, and other extreme sports are becoming more popular every year. Seda Kaçan secured the championship title in the DSG class of the 2024 TCR European Endurance, becoming the first woman to do so.

International wrestling styles governed by FILA such as Freestyle wrestling and Greco-Roman wrestling are also popular, with many European, World and Olympic championship titles won by Turkish wrestlers both individually and as a national team. Another major sport in which the Turks have been internationally successful is weightlifting; as Turkish weightlifters, both male and female, have broken numerous world records and won several European, World and Olympic championship titles. Naim Süleymanoğlu and Halil Mutlu have achieved legendary status as one of the few weightlifters to have won three gold medals in three Olympics. Boxing follows the same trend with Buse Naz Çakıroğlu and Busenaz Sürmeneli having wom medals, also Ibo Aslan competing in UFC.

Other notable mentions include Zeynep Sönmez (WTA Tour winner) and Selen Eryüce (Ironman Triathlon winner). Turkey hosted the 2005 Summer Universiade in İzmir and the 2011 Winter Universiade in Erzurum.

=== Leisure and tourism ===
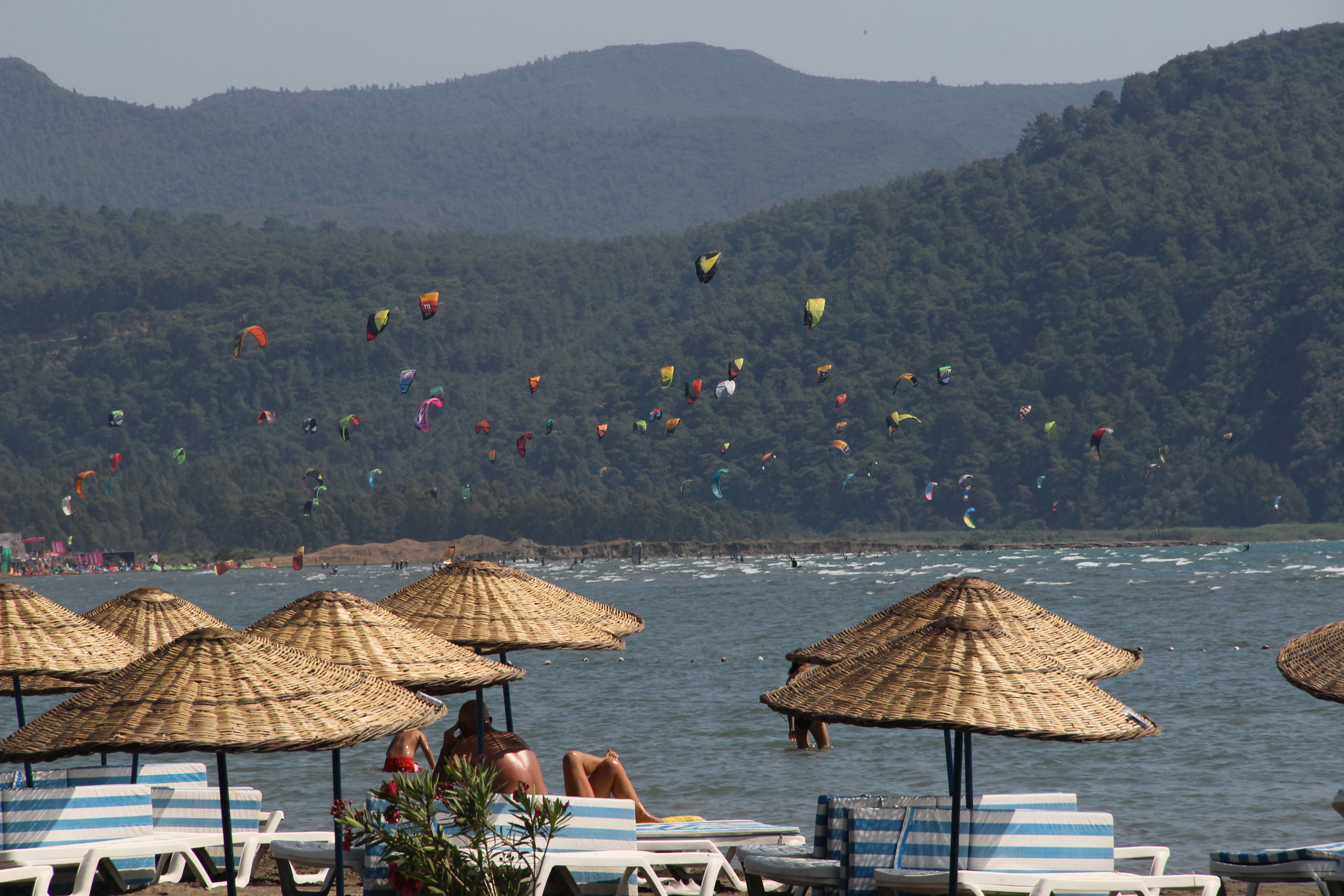
Kitesurfers in Akyaka, Muğla

Recreational activities in Turkey include hiking, skiing, beach tourism, and thermal spas. The country’s diverse geography—from the Mediterranean coast to the mountains of Eastern Anatolia—offers a wide range of outdoor pursuits. Domestic tourism has grown significantly in recent years, contributing to regional cultural exchange. Yazlık - 'summer house' is a common concept among society for spending holidays.

== Global influence and diaspora ==
=== Cultural exports ===
Turkey has become a major exporter of cultural products, particularly television series, cuisine, and fashion. Turkish dramas are broadcast in over 150 countries, often depicting family, love, and honor in ways that resonate with global audiences. Turkish coffee and dishes such as baklava and döner kebab have also gained international recognition.

=== Diaspora and international presence ===
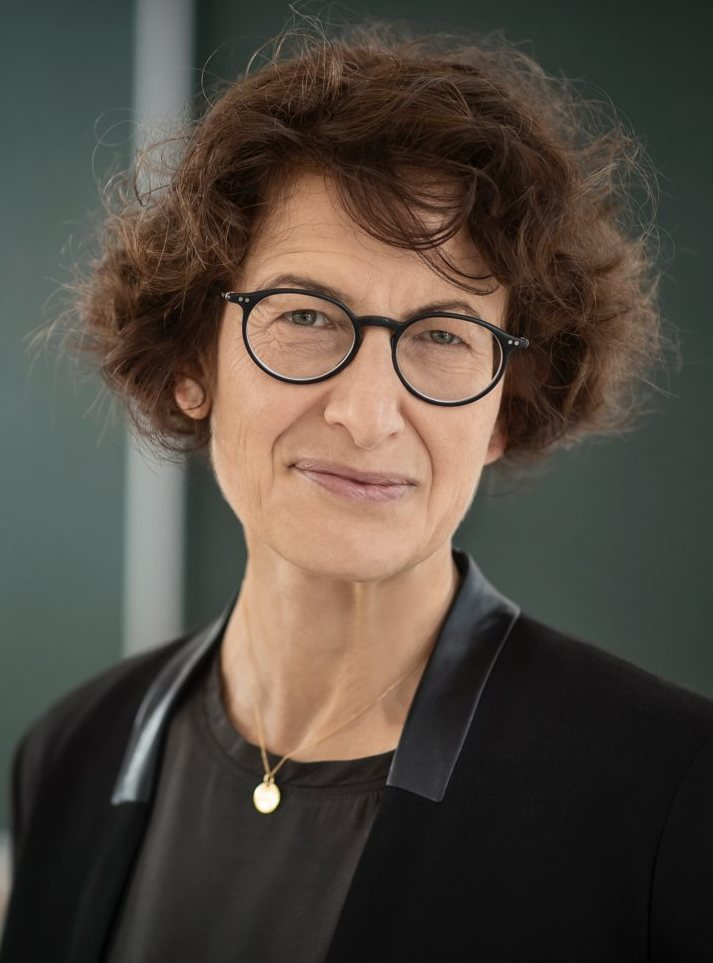
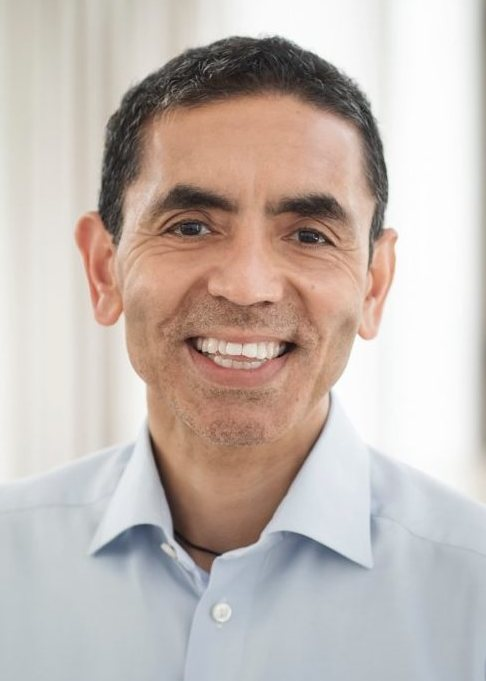
Özlem Türeci & Uğur Şahin, the duo co-founded BioNTech, the company that developed one of the first COVID-19 vaccines. They’re widely celebrated for their groundbreaking work in mRNA technology and cancer research.

Significant Turkish diaspora communities exist in Germany, the Netherlands, Austria, and North America. These communities maintain cultural ties to Turkey while also contributing to the multicultural landscapes of their host countries. Issues of integration, identity, and transnational belonging are key topics in diaspora studies.

Turkey’s cultural diplomacy efforts include the Yunus Emre Institutes, which promote Turkish language and culture abroad. Participation in international events, such as the Venice Biennale or UNESCO heritage programs, highlights Turkey’s desire to assert itself as a global cultural actor.

== See also ==
- List of Intangible Cultural Heritage elements in Turkey
- List of museums in Turkey
- Cornucopia (magazine)
- Victorian Turkish baths
- Another Look at East and Southeast Turkey
