= History of modern Turkish painting =

The history of modern Turkish painting can be traced back to the modernization efforts in the Ottoman Empire during the Tanzimat period, in the 19th century. This article contains a brief history of Turkish painters and art movements from the mid-19th century to the present.

== Mid-19th century to early 20th century ==
Turkish painting, in the Western sense, developed actively starting from the mid-19th century.

- Ferik İbrahim Paşa (1815–1891)
- Osman Nuri Paşa (c.1839–1906)
- Osman Hamdi Bey (1842–1910)
- Şeker Ahmet Paşa (1841–1907)
- Halil Paşa (c.1857–1939)
- Hoca Ali Riza (1864–1939)

The very first painting lessons were scheduled at the Mühendishane-i Berri-i Humayun (Military School of Engineering) in 1793 mostly for technical purposes. Artists who formed the 19th-century art milieu were often from Ottoman military schools. Additionally, local Christian and "Levantine" artists, as well as foreign painters who lived in Istanbul and other parts of the Ottoman Empire, contributed to the art milieu in 19th century Turkey. Some Turkish artists, such as Osman Hamdi Bey, Şeker Ahmet Paşa, Süleyman Seyyid and Halil Paşa were educated in arts abroad. Others, such as Hüseyin Zekai Paşa, Hoca Ali Riza, and Ahmet Ziya Akbulut were educated within the country.

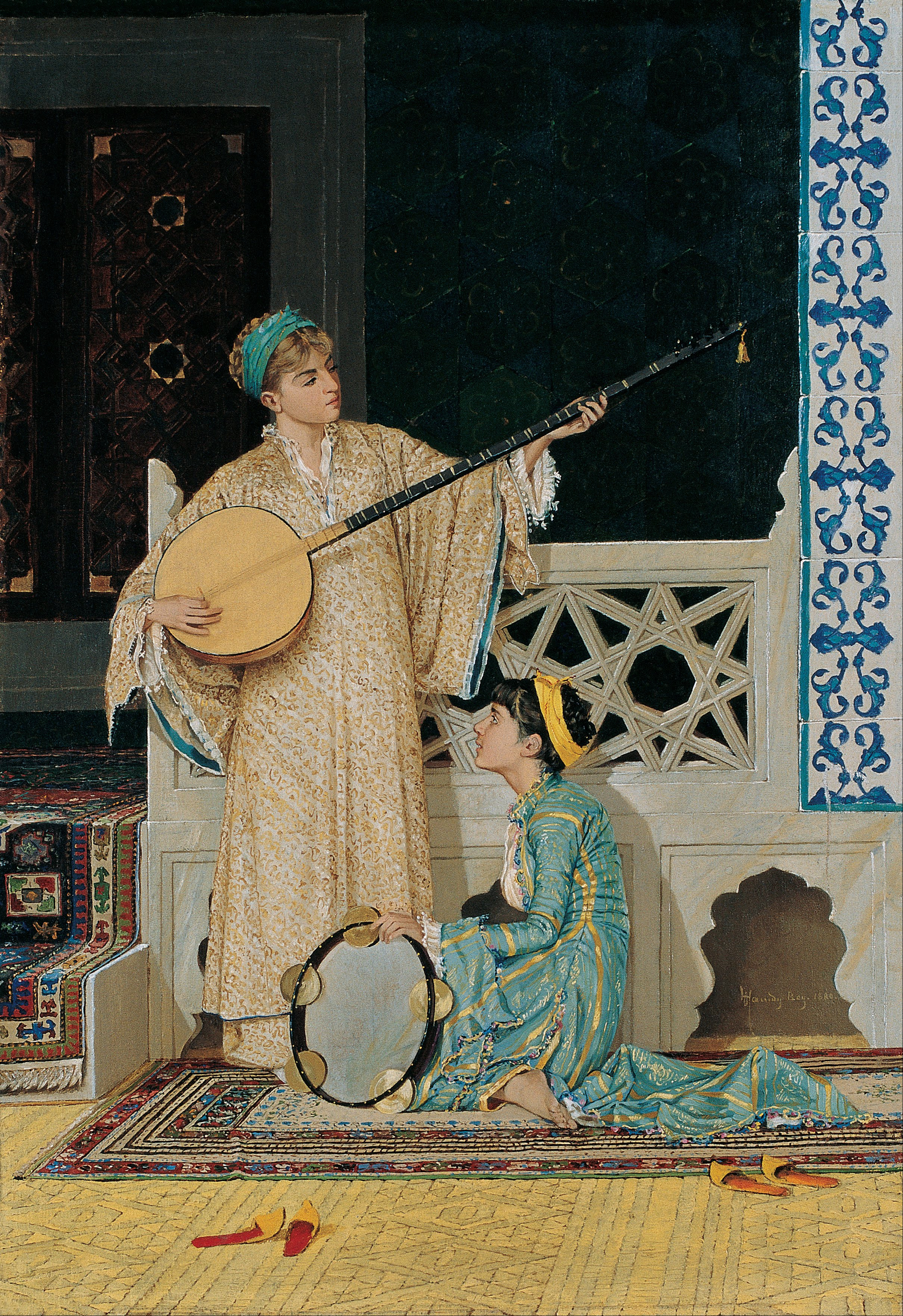
Two Musician Girls by Osman Hamdi Bey

The Tortoise Trainer by Osman Hamdi Bey, 1906

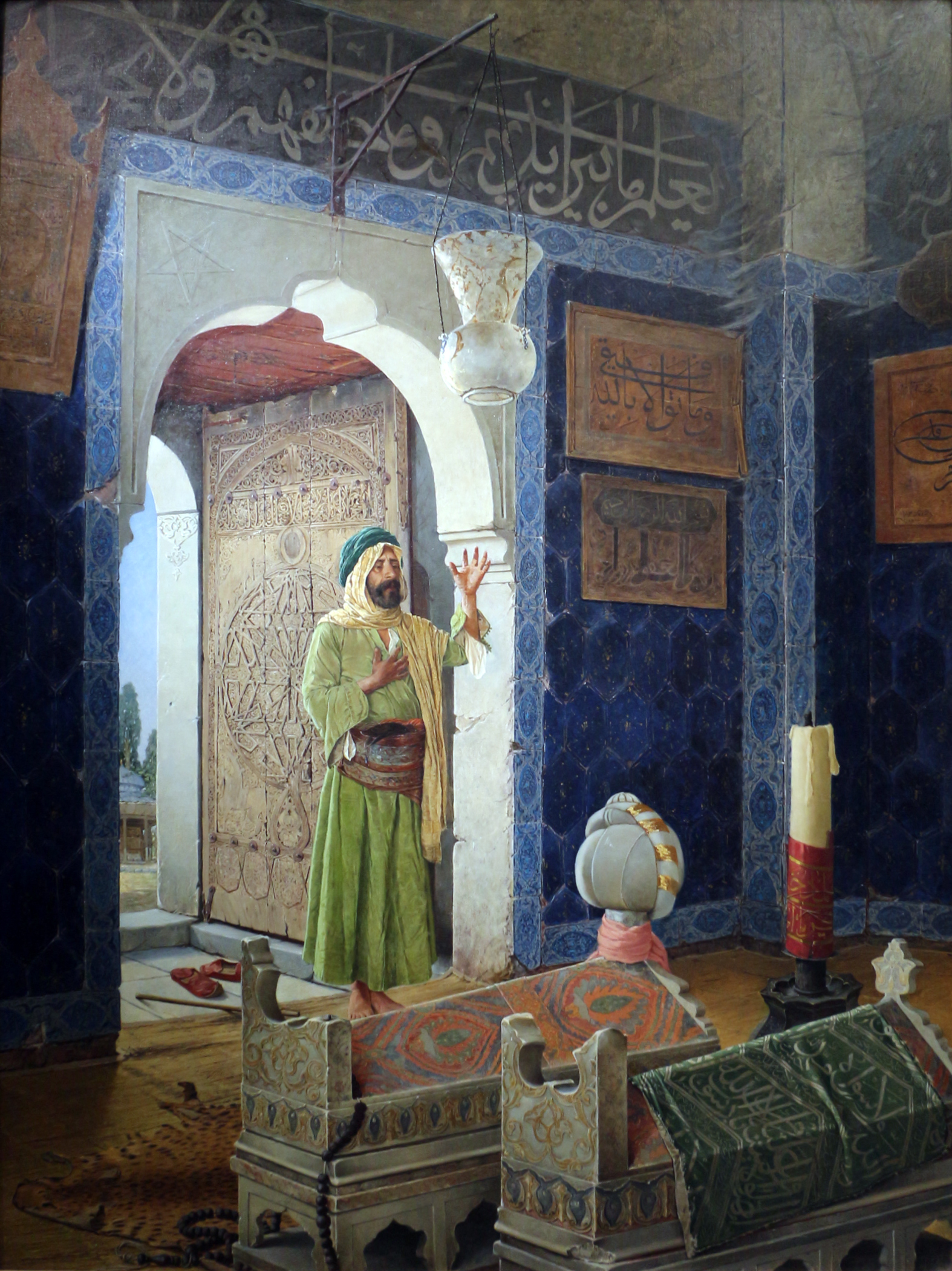
Work by Osman Hamdi Bey

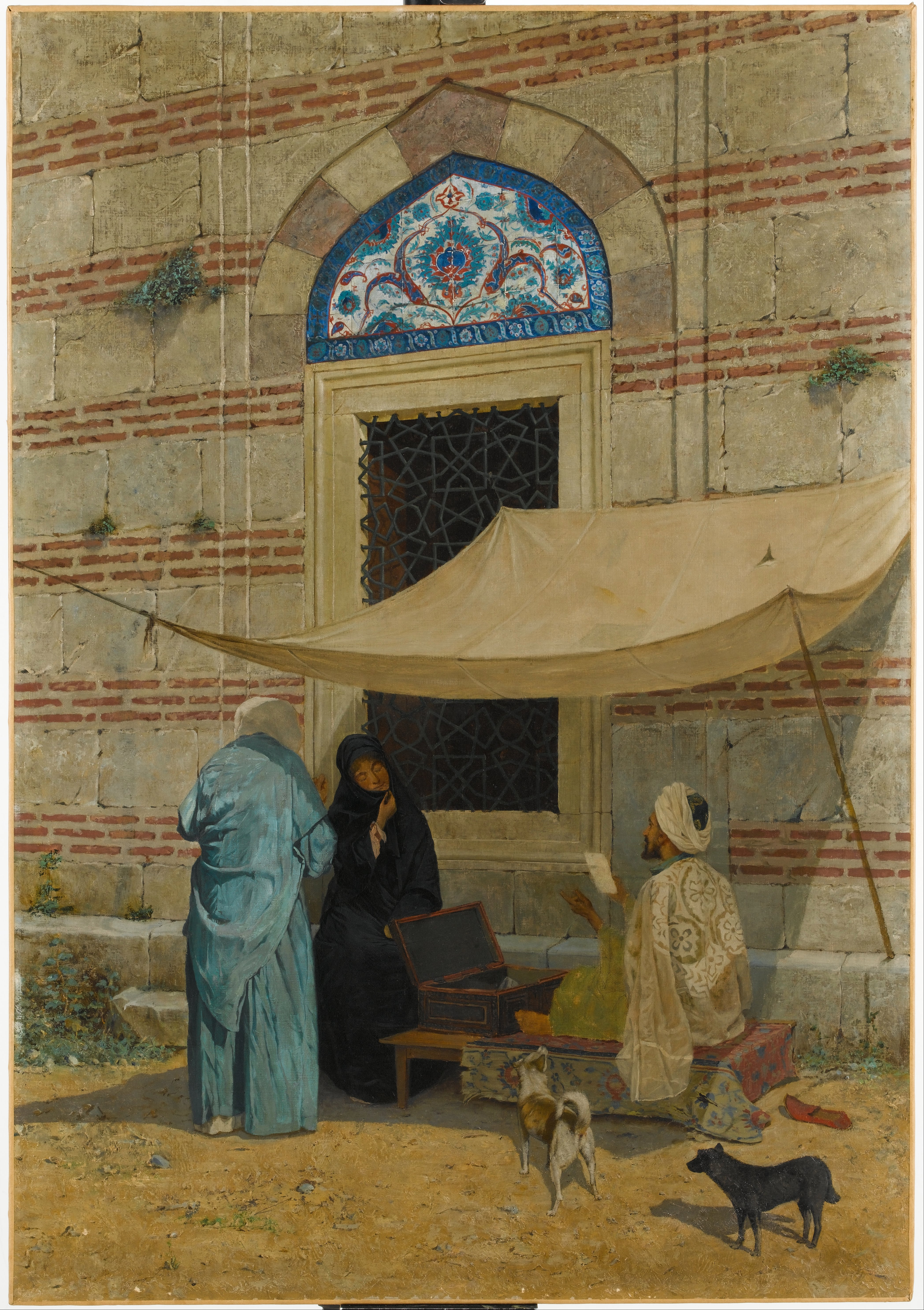
Arzuhalci by Osman Hamdi Bey

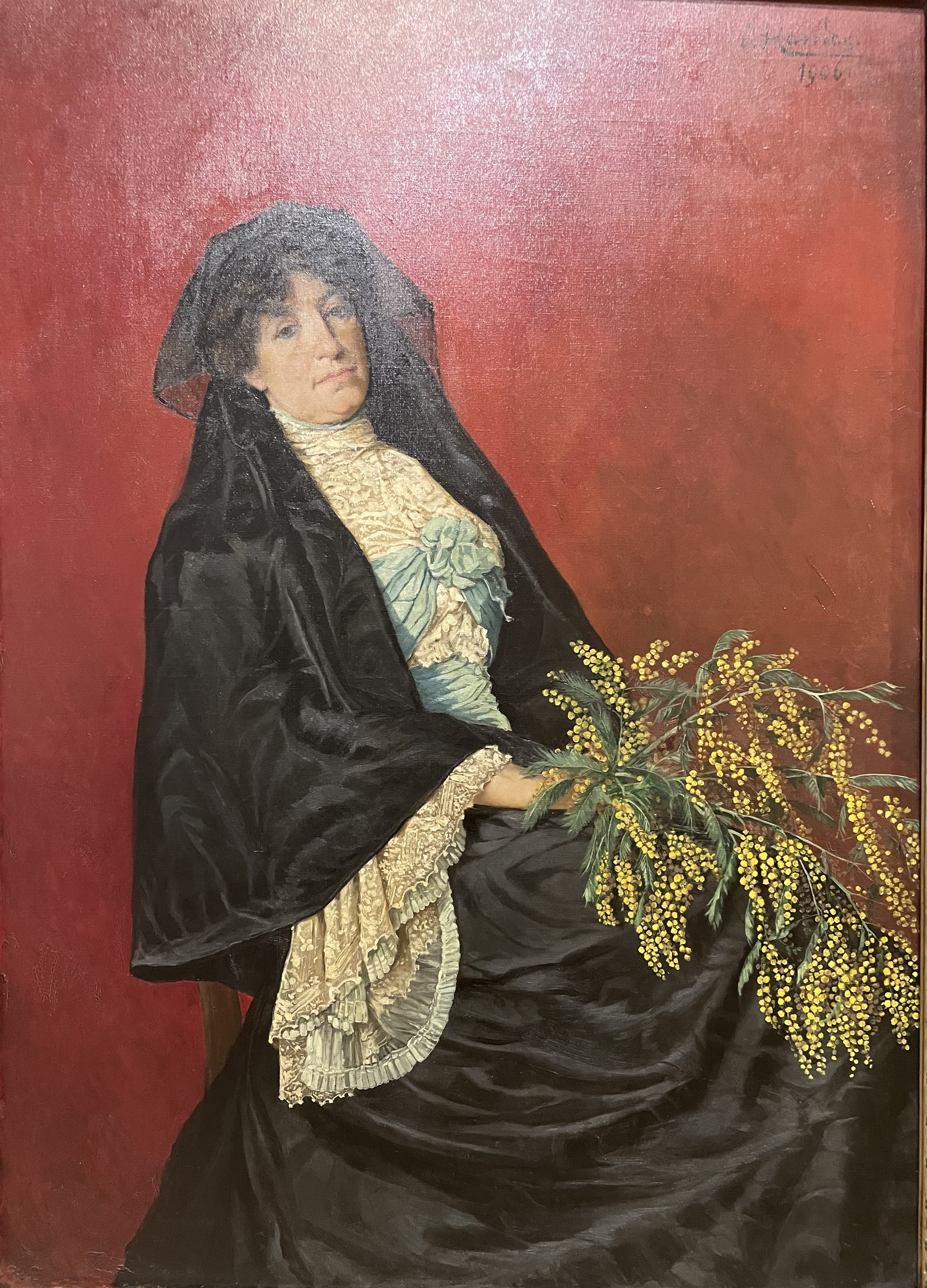
Woman with Mimosa by Osman Hamdi Bey

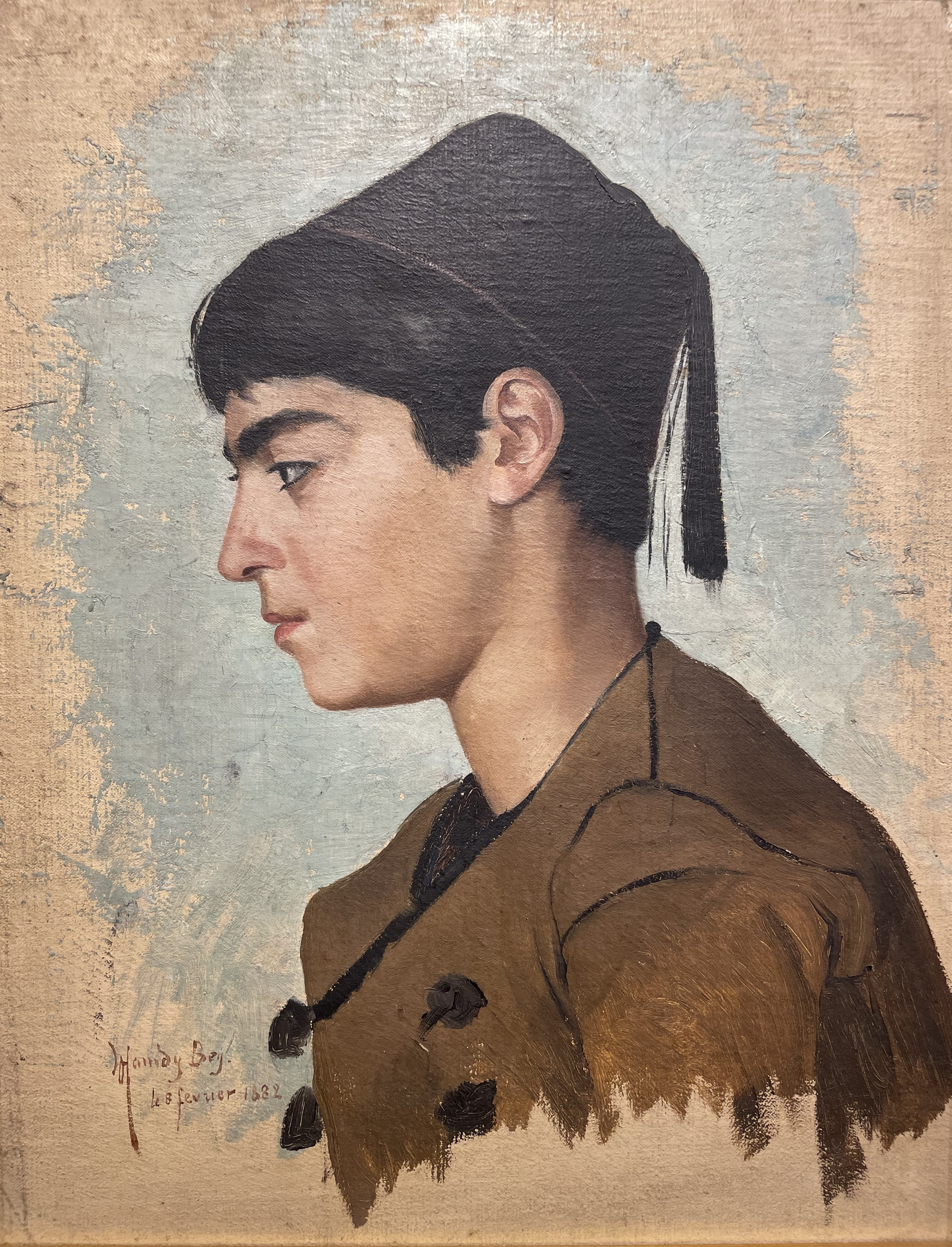
Boy Wearing a Fez (1882) by Osman Hamdi Bey

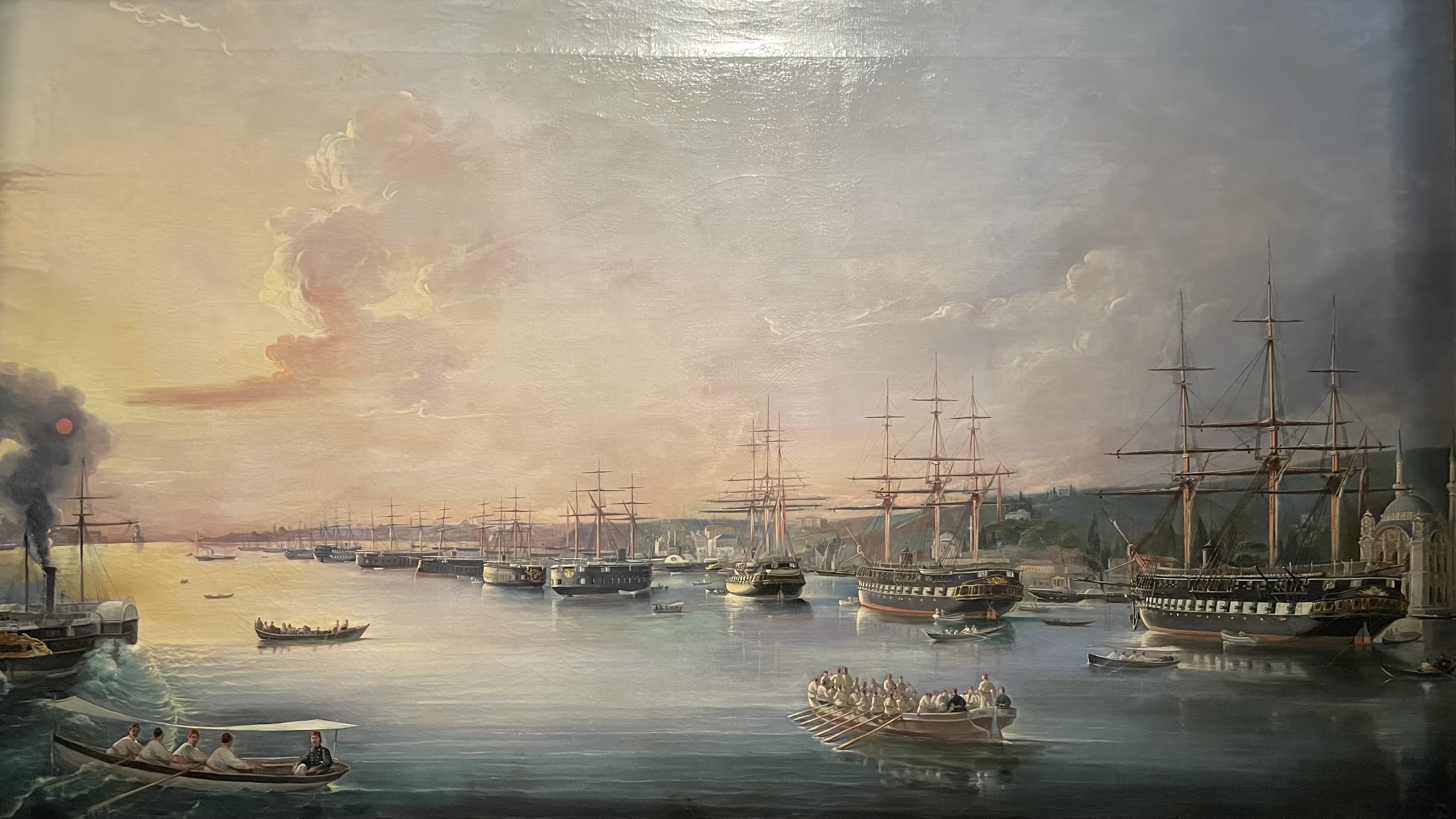
Ottoman Navy at Ortaköy in Painting Museum of Dolmabahçe Palace

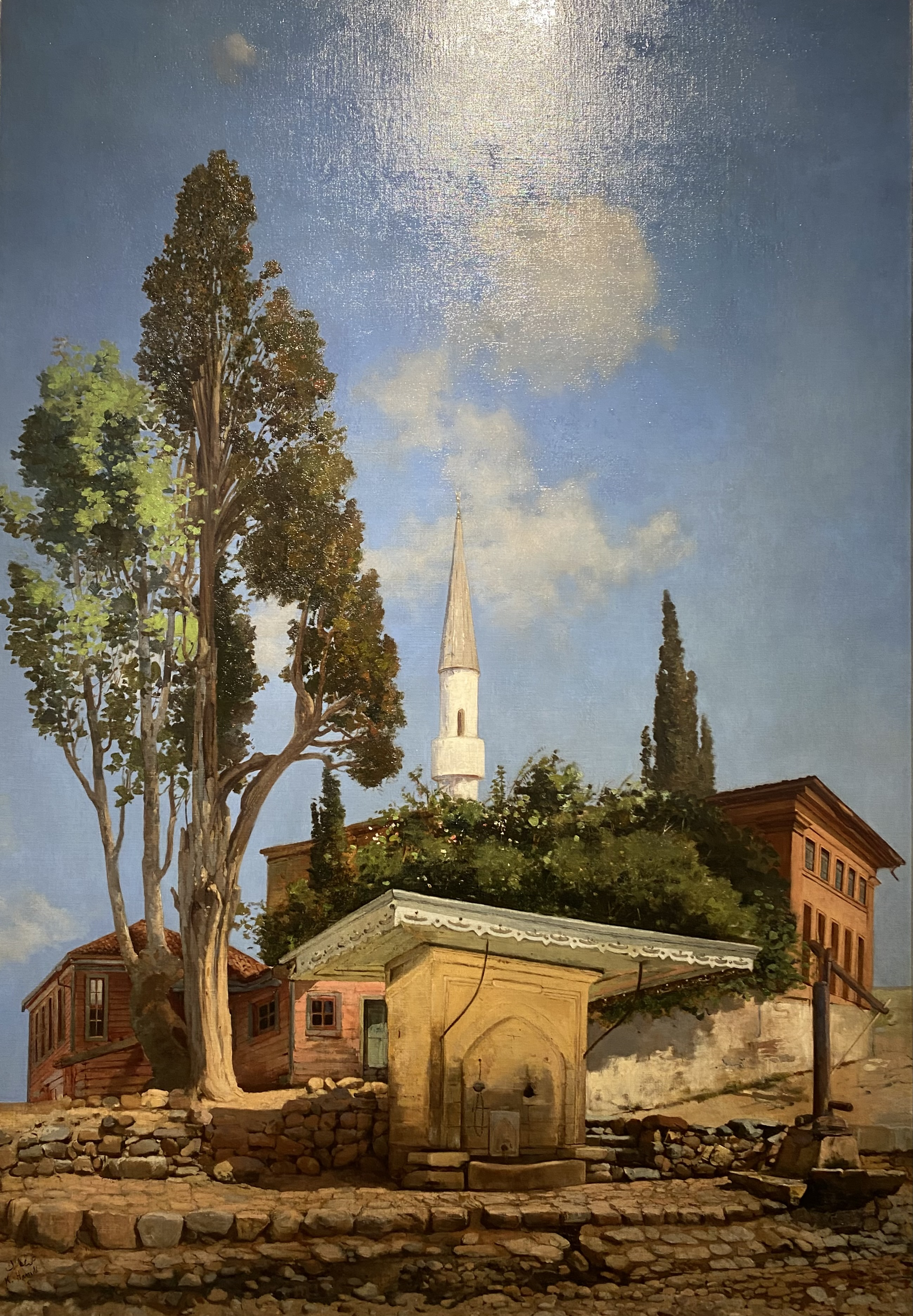
Landscape by Hamdi Kenan (19th century)

== The "1914 Generation" ==
- Nazmi Ziya Güran (1881–1937)

Contemporary trends that emphasize figure started to appear gradually in Turkey with the "1914 Generation". Figure and composition entered the Turkish painting for the first time in the Western sense with this generation. The İnas Sanayi-i Nefise Mektebi (School of Fine Arts for Girls) was founded for young women in 1914. Mihri Müşfik Hanım, and Feyhaman Duran were the first instructors.

A studio was built with army support in Şişli, a district of Istanbul, with Celal Esat Arseven's attempt in 1917. Hüseyin Avni Lifij's "Progress" and "War Allegory", İbrahim Çallı's "Cannon Carrier", Mehmet Ruhi's "Stone Breakers" were the first examples of multi-figured and large dimensional compositions realised prior to and following this period.

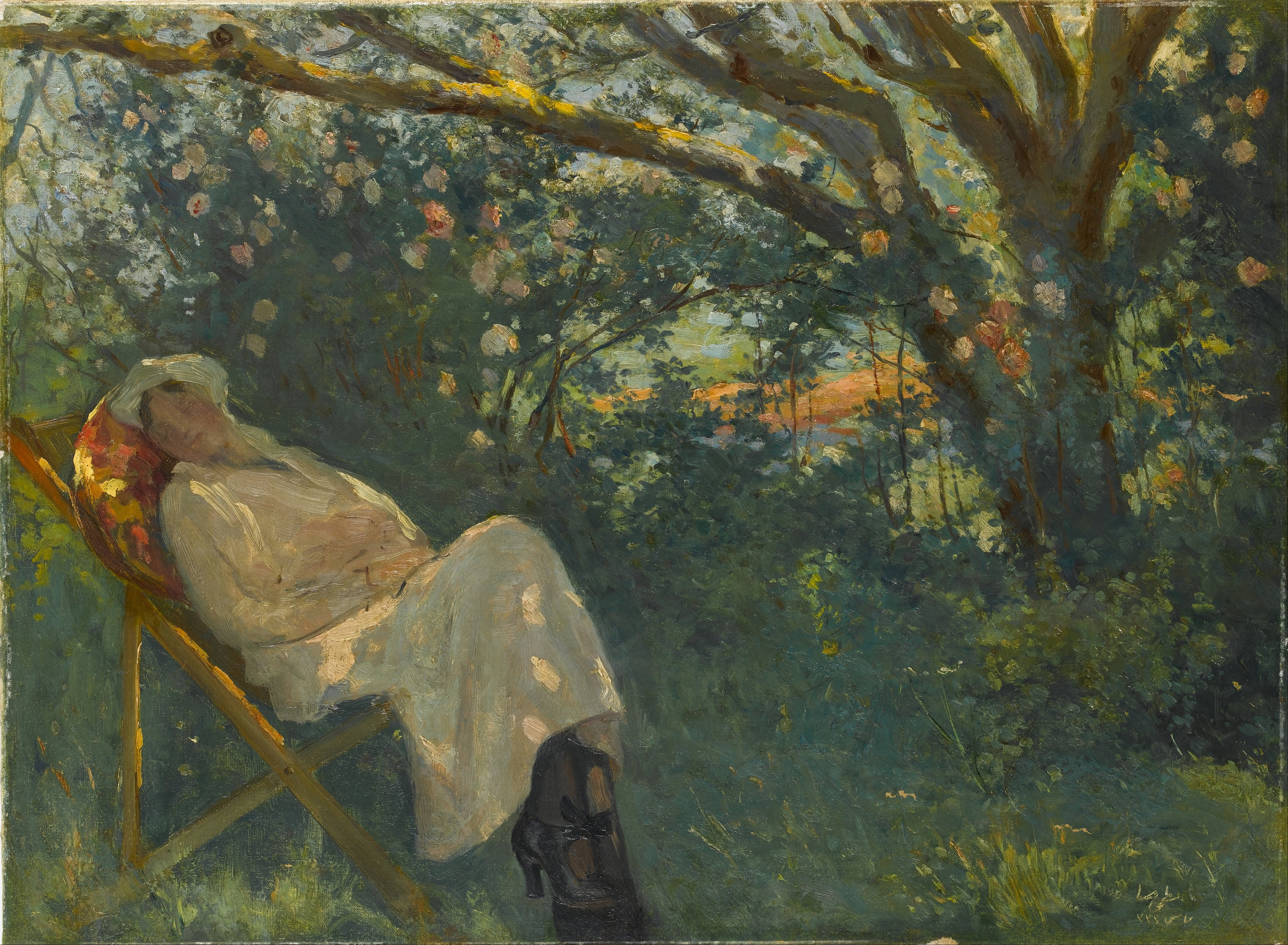
Lady in Pink on a Chaise Longue (1904)

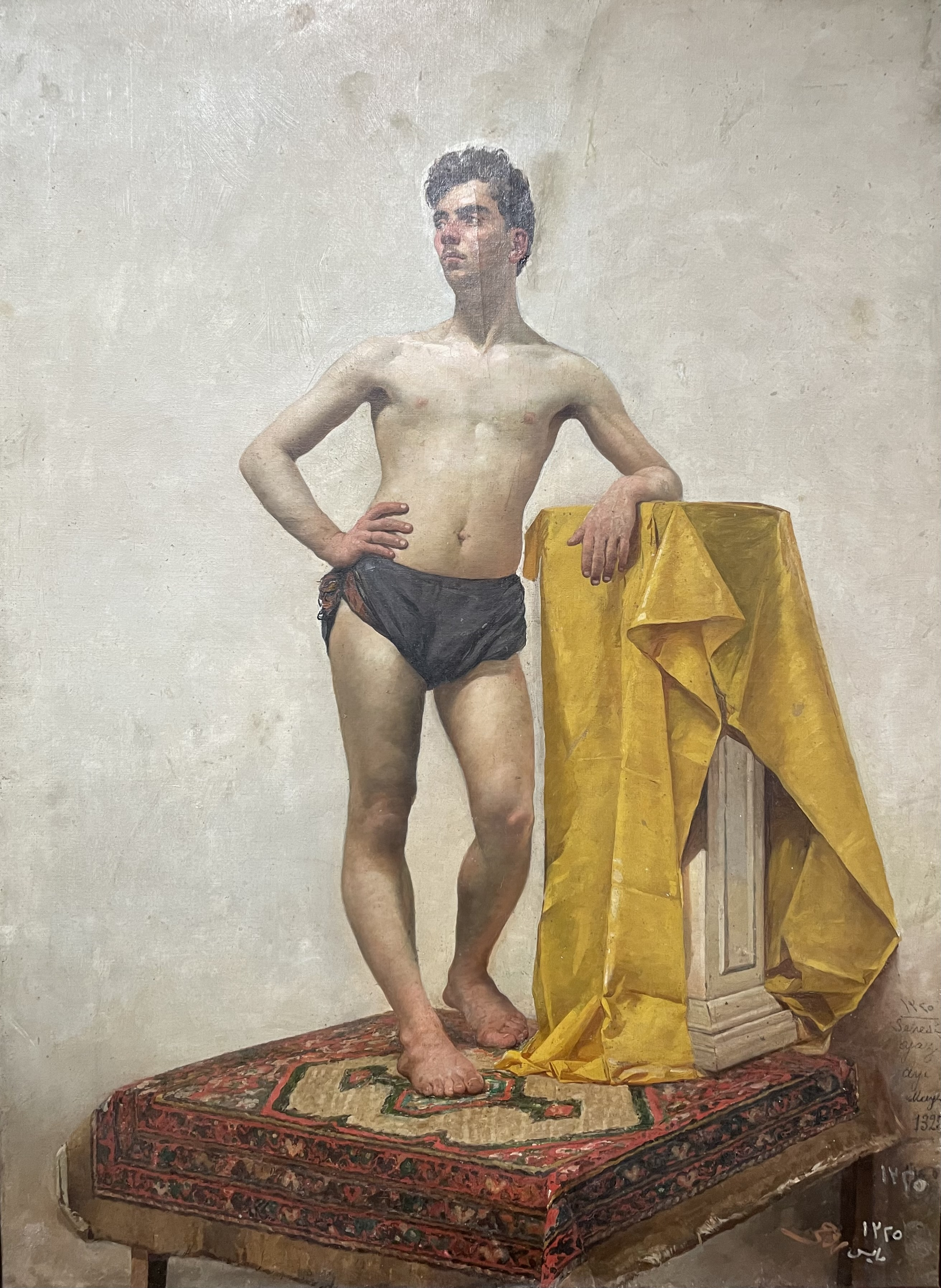
Model for a Male Body by Mehmet Ruhi Arel (1880–1931)

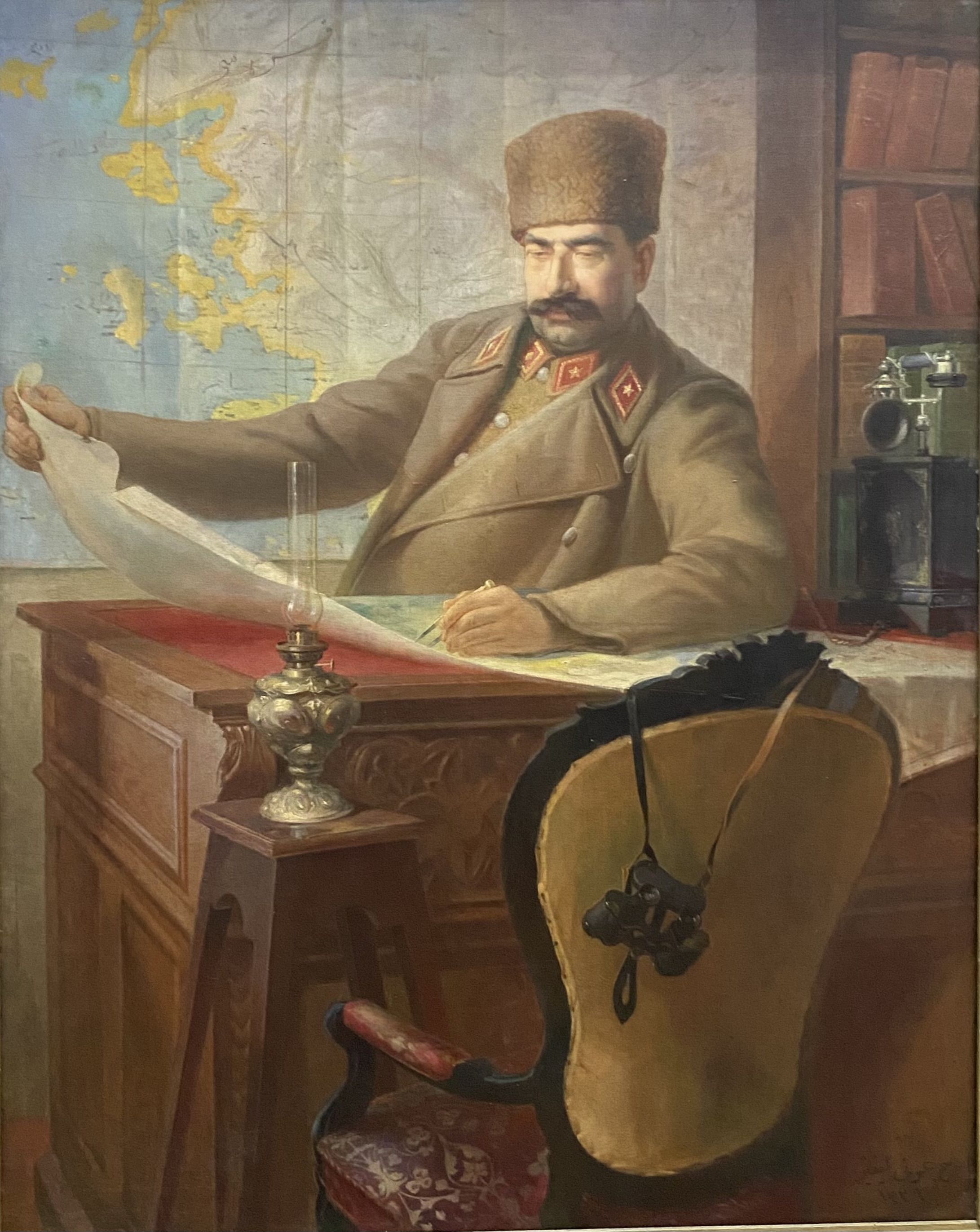
Portrait of Marashall Fevzi Çakmak by Hüseyin Avni Lifij

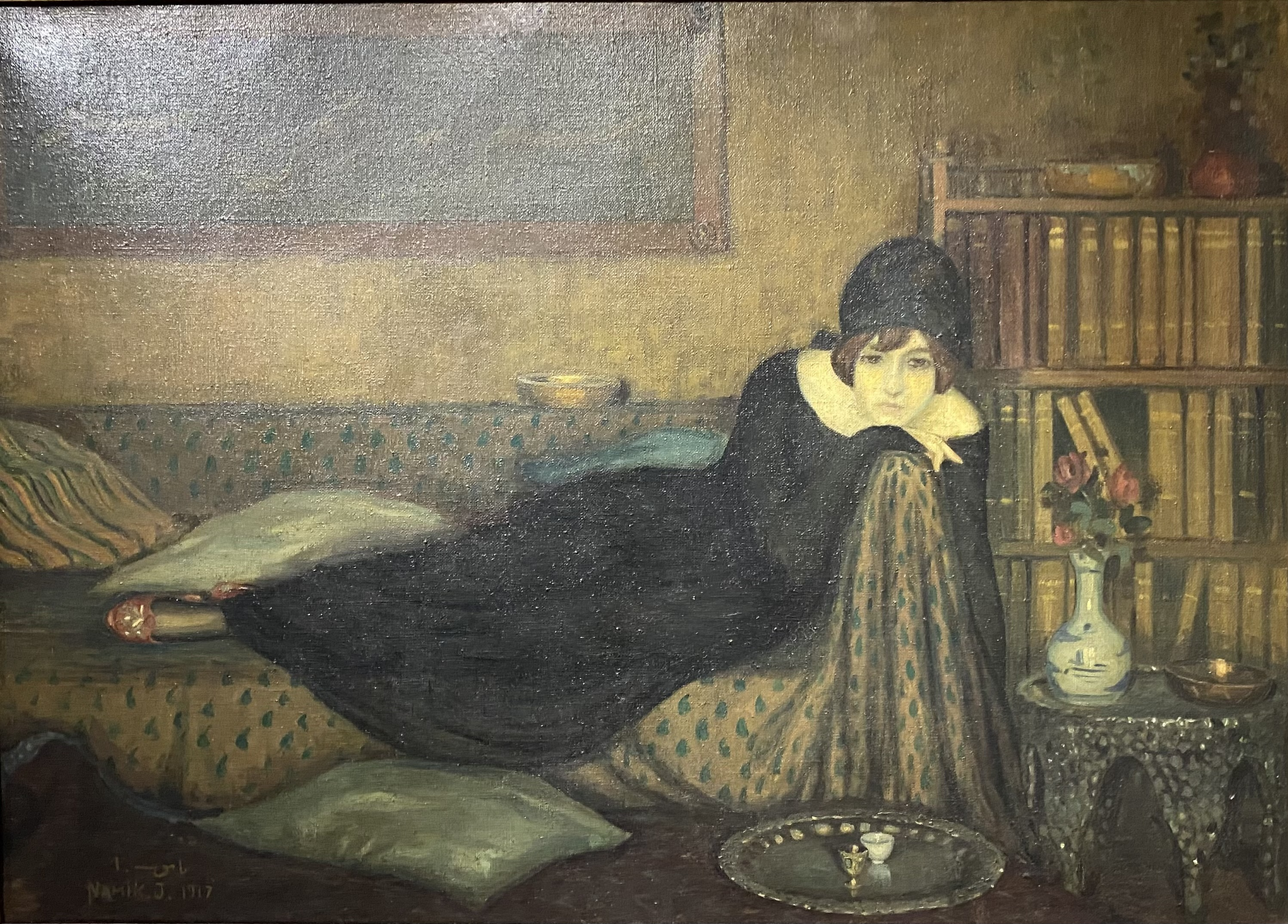
Woman Reclining on the Couch (Contemplation) by Namık İsmail (1917)

== The Independents (Müstakiller) ==
The young Turkish artists sent to Europe in 1926 came back inspired by contemporary trends such as Fauvism, Cubism and even Expressionism, still very influential in Europe, and they took a stand against the "1914 Generation" members. The important goals of this new group were, though not very absolute, pictorial design structure and linear foundation rather than impressionist colorism. The activities of the group, under the name of "Association of Independent Painters and Sculptors", expanded with the participation of new artists in 1928. The association's founders were mostly painters, such as:

- Hale Asaf (1905–1938)
- Muhittin Sebati (1901–1932)
- Ratip Aşir Acudoğlu (1898–1957), sculptor
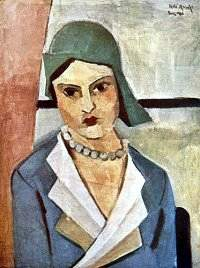
Self-portrait of Hale Asaf (1905–1938)

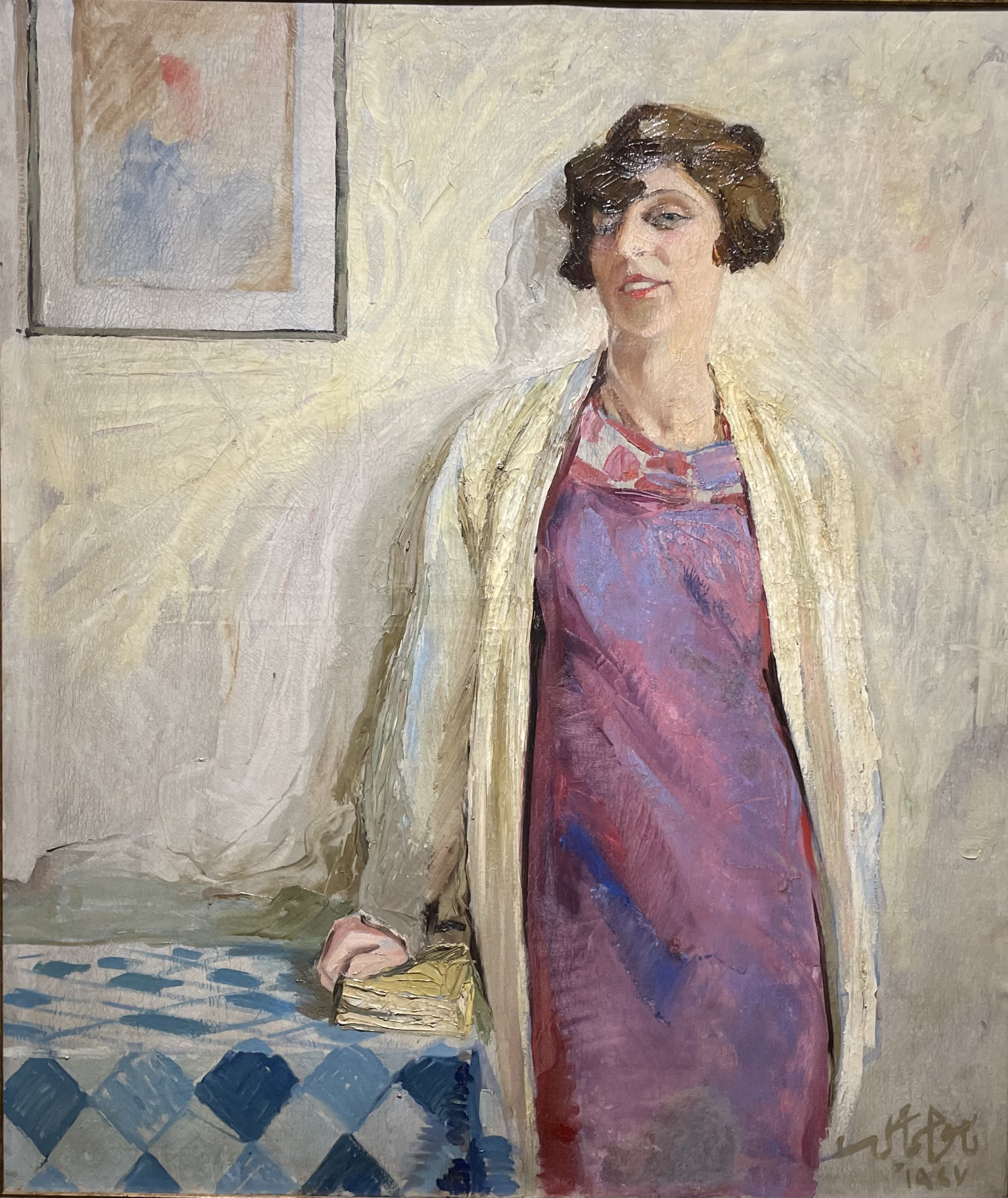
Portrait: Standing Woman (1927) by Namık Ismail (1890–1935)

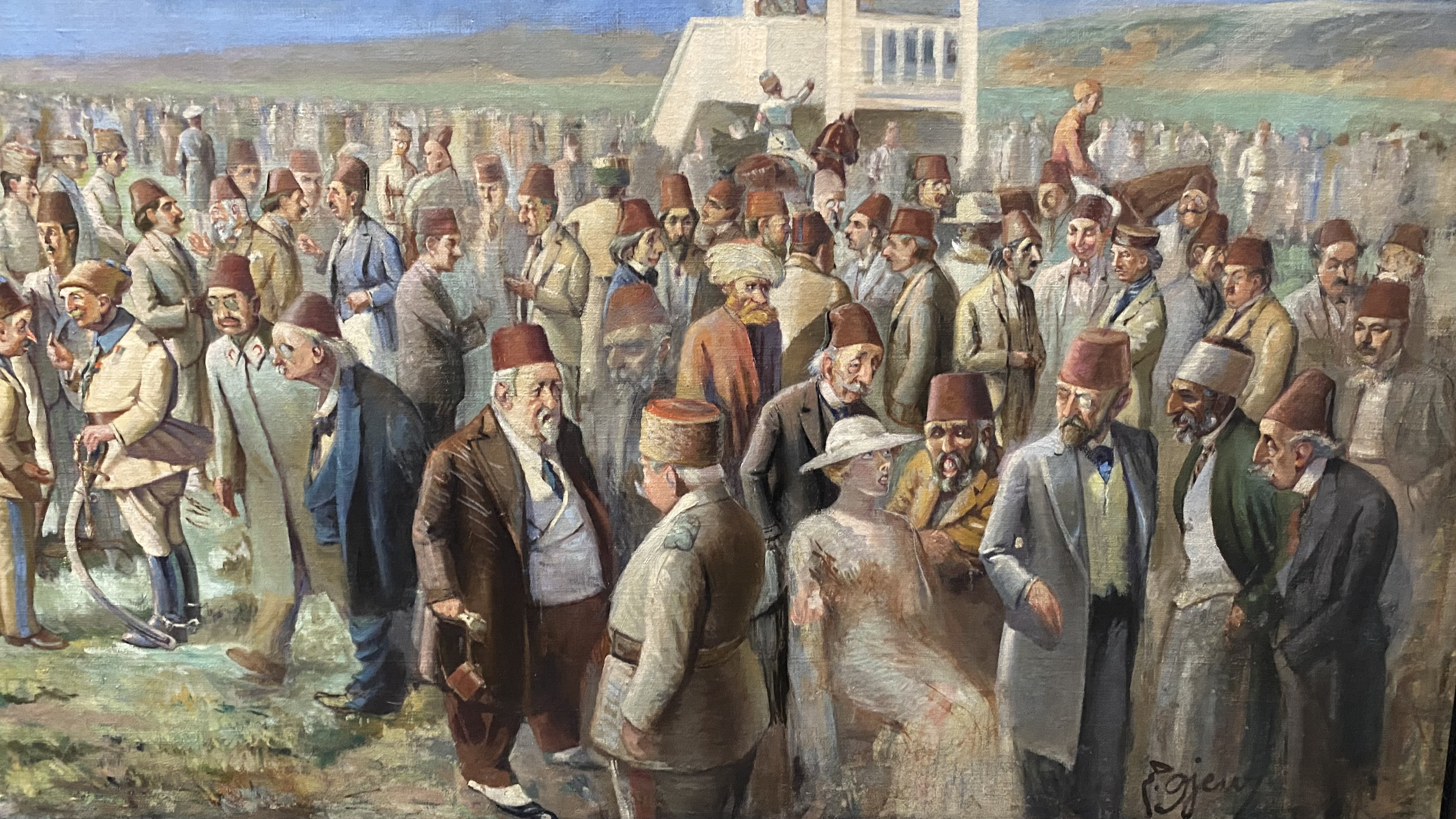
Details of Veli Efendi Meadow by Cemil Cem (1882–1950)

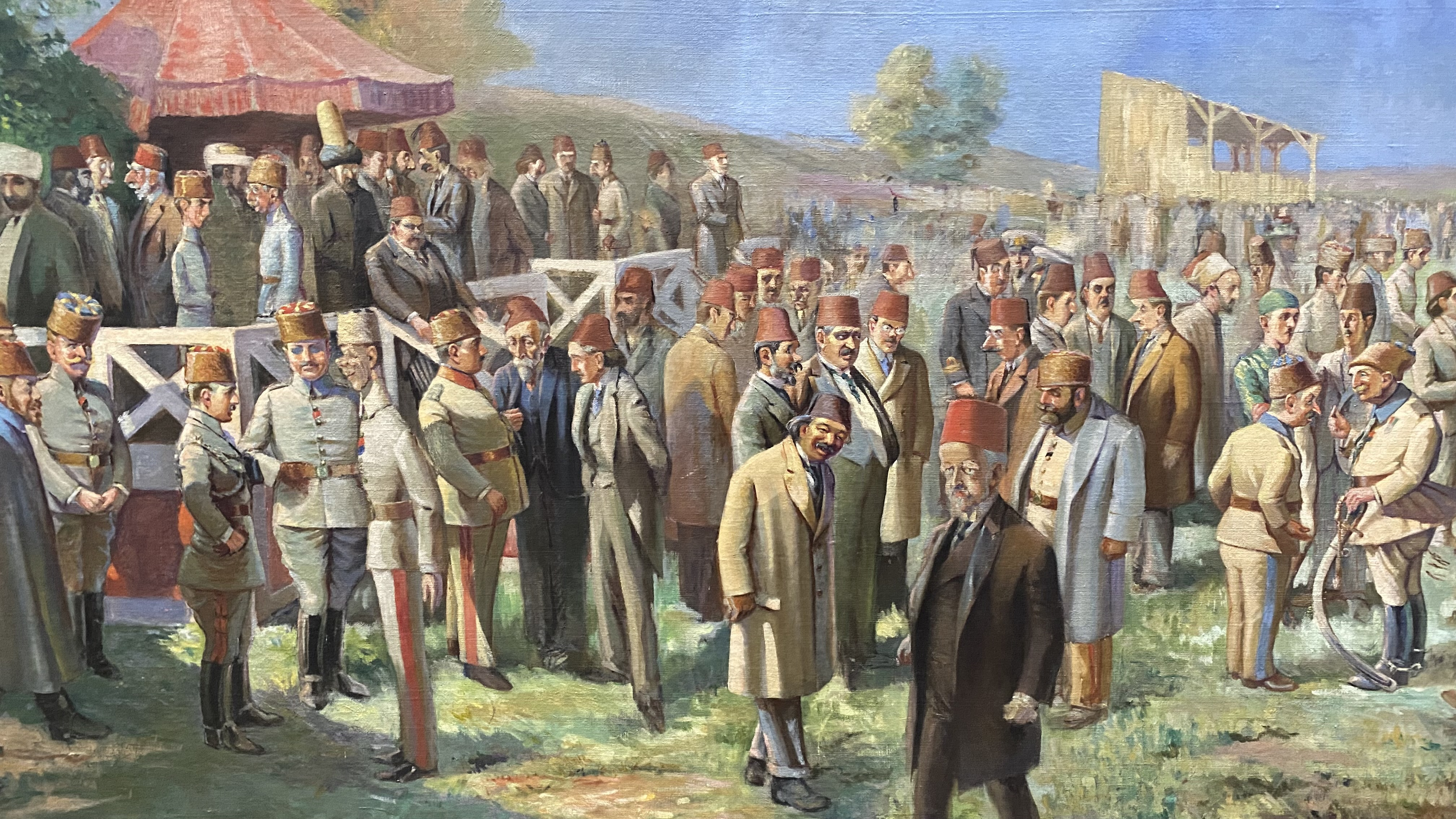
Details of Veli Efendi Meadow by Cemil Cem (1882–1950)

== During the 30s ==
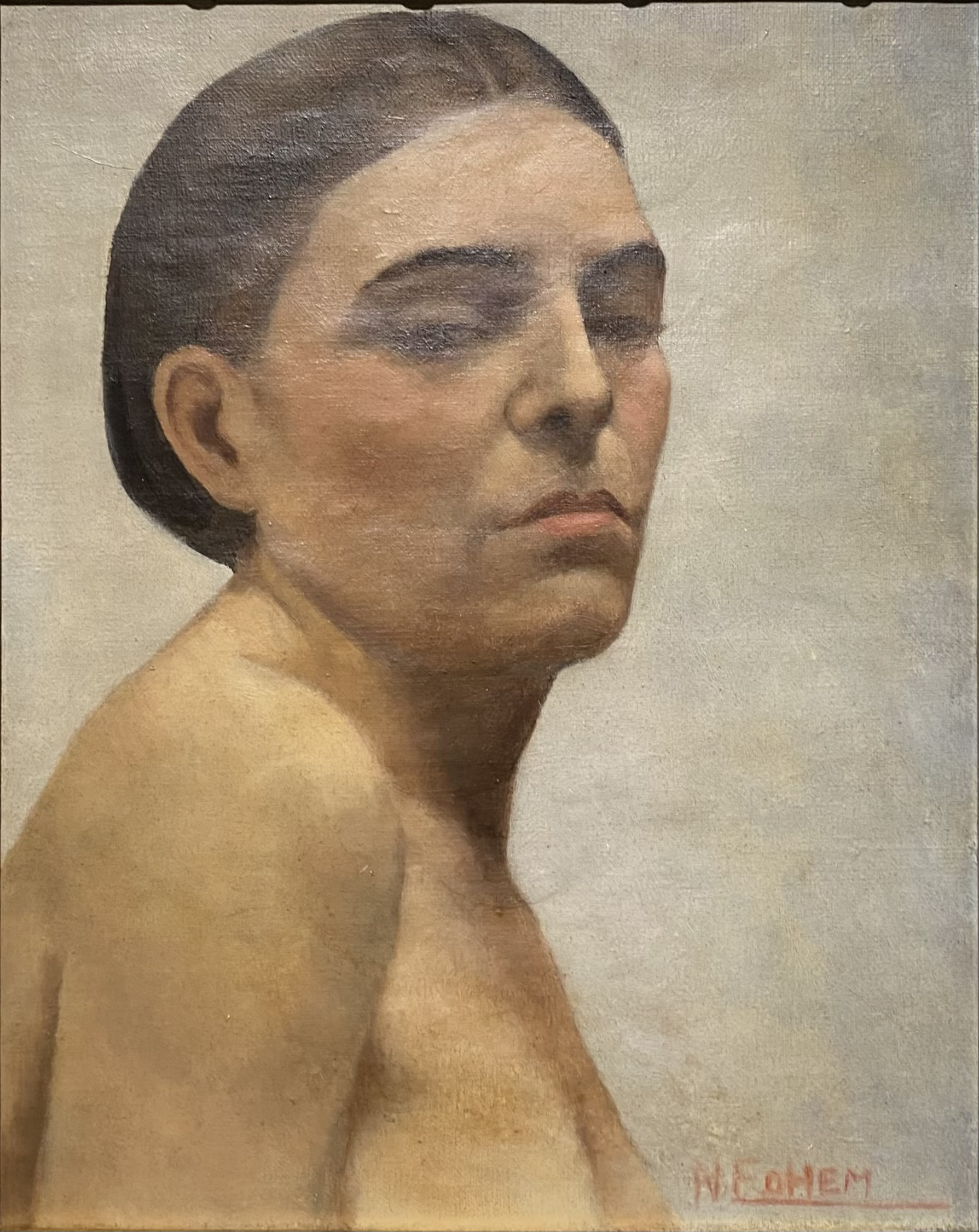
Portrait of a woman by Nevin Edhem Hamdi (1910–1931) The painter died of Tuberculosis at the age of 21.

== "The Group D" ==
While the Müstakiller (the "Independents") opened the doors of contemporary trends in Turkey, we see a newly founded group in 1933 which would give greater support to these efforts and of which their effectiveness lasted until the 1950s: "Group D".

Group members were:

- Abidin Dino (1913–1993)

The most significant distinction of "Group D" from the "Independents" was perhaps that they had gathered around a certain aesthetics with solidarity in determination to defend the new trends they wanted to bring in. "Group D" had not been representative of any particular view. They were open to anything new except Impressionism. The star of the Çallı generation faded away gradually after the "Independents" and "Group D" members had started to work at the academy.

- Cemal Tollu (1899–1968)
- Bedri Rahmi Eyuboğlu (1911–1975)

Besides all this progress, from the beginning there had also been independent artists. Among these

- Fikret Mualla
- Adnan Coker (born 1927)
- Fahrunissa Zeid (1901–1991)
- Burhan Doğançay (1929–2013)
- Turan Erol (1927–2023)
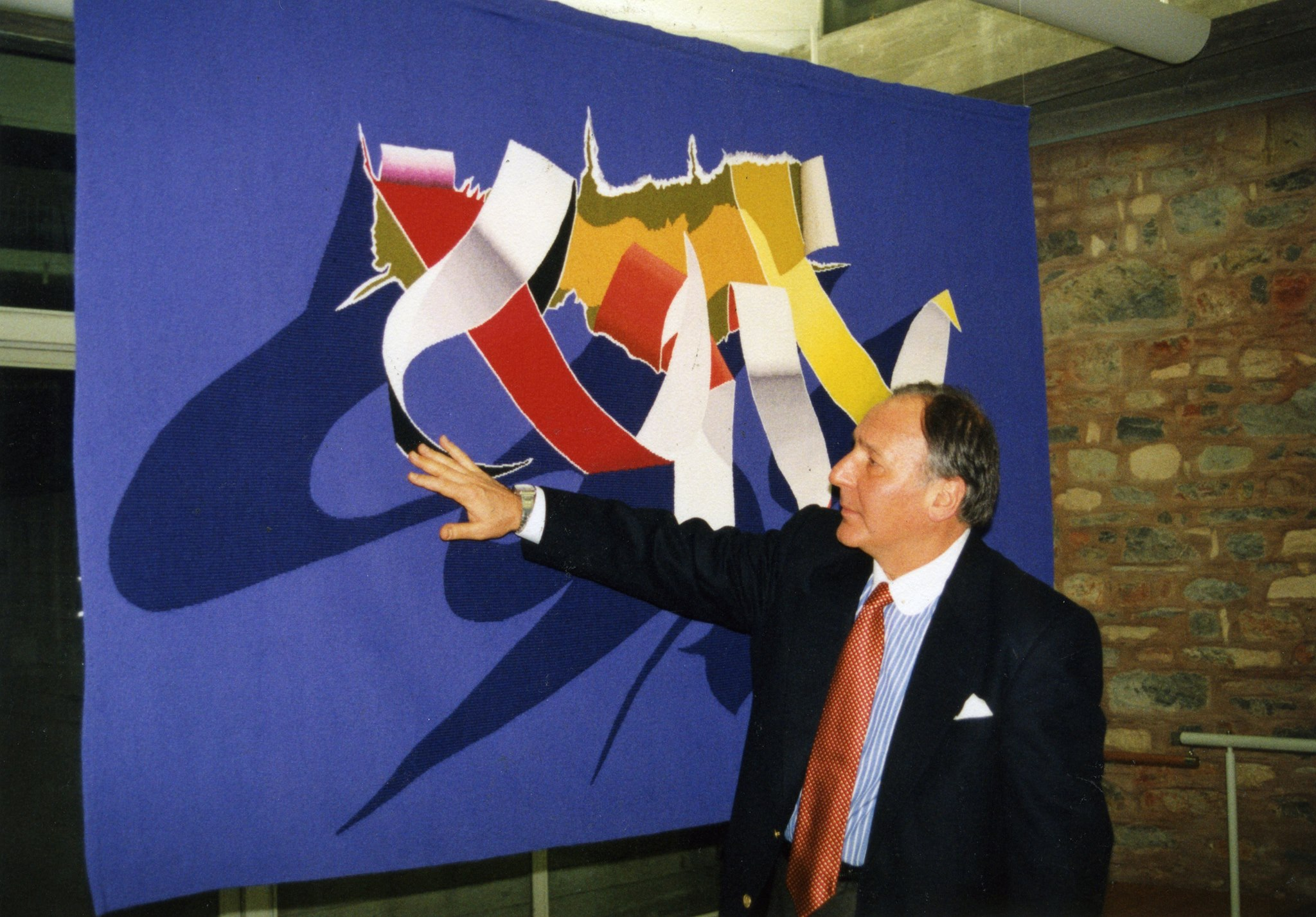
Yahşi Baraz in front of Burhan Doğançay's work

== The Group Ten (On'lar Grubu 1947–1955) ==
The Group Ten was a group of painters founded by the students of Bedri Rahmi Eyüpoğlu, active between 1947 and 1955.

The group was established with the aim of bringing a unique style to Turkish painting and encouraging the public to art by blending the art of the West with Turkish motifs. Elif Naci's "The sources of Turkish painting should not be sought beyond the Alps, but at the foot of the Taurus Mountains." His word was the band's motto. At the entrance of the first exhibition held in the academy's hall, the reproduction of a painting by El Greco on one side and the Anatolian rug embroidery on the other reveals the general tendency of the group.

The Group Ten was founded in 1942 by ten students from Bedri Rahmi Eyüboğlu's workshop. These ten students were Ivy Stangali, Leyla Gamsız, Hulusi Sarptürk, Mustafa Esirkuş, Nedim Günsür, Fahrünnisa Sönmez, Turan Erol, Orhan Peker, Mehmet Pesen and Fikret Otyam.[1] After the first exhibition, the artists who joined the group, whose members reached thirty within a year; Adnan Varince, Nevin Demiryol (Cokay), Perihan Ege, Özden Ergökçen, Naim Fakihoğlu, Fuat İgbelli, Remzi Raşa, Gönül Tiner, Hayrullah Tiner, İlhan Uğhan, Sedat Uslu, Cafer Yazdıran, Sema Akdağ, Necmi Başkurt, Cezmi Çelebioğlu, Aliye Kara, Osman Yenisey and Ilkay Üçkaya.[1]

Established with the encouragement of Bedri Rahmi, they are the first group in Turkish painting to gather around a certain artistic understanding and try to create a common art style, and have gone far beyond a student movement and have gained an important place in the history of Turkish painting. Having held exhibitions for eight years, the group disbanded in 1955.

== The Newcomers Group (Yeniler Grubu) (late 1930s) ==
The Newcomers Group, (Yeniler Grubu) was formed by those who had a social realist understanding. After they opening of their "Harbour Paintings Exhibition", they had been remembered as the "Harbour Painters".

- Avni Arbaş (1919–2003)

=== Other ===
- Abidin Elderoğlu
- Ercument Kalmik
- Nese Erdok
- Eren Eyüboğlu
- Sabri Berkel
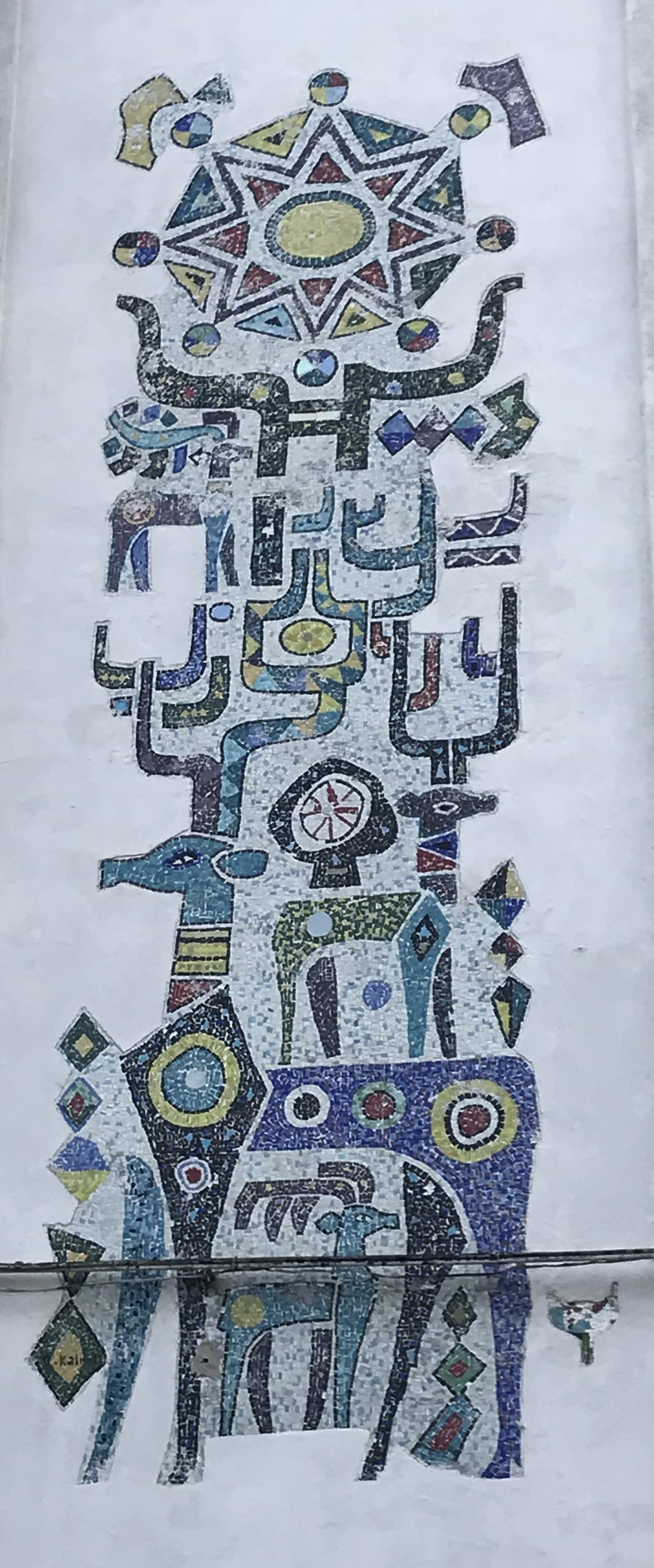
Ercument Kalmik mosaic in 4.Levent Istanbul

== During the 50s ==
Turkish painting has continued to flourish since the 1960s, with an increasing rate of development, as evidenced by many new artists in many different styles.

== During the 60s ==
The Siyah Qalam Group Siyah Kalem group founded in 1960 in Ankara. They were influenced by the 14th and early 15th century painter Siyah Qalam.

- İhsan Cemal Karaburçak
- Cemal Bingöl
- İsmail Altınok
- Ayşe Sılay
- Selma Arel
- Lütfü Günay
- Asuman Kılıç
- Solmaz Tugaç

The 1968 Generation

- Alaettin Aksoy
- Gürkan Coşkun
- Mehmet Güleryüz
- Neşe Erdok
- Nevhiz Metin
- Omer Kaleshi
- Utku Varlık
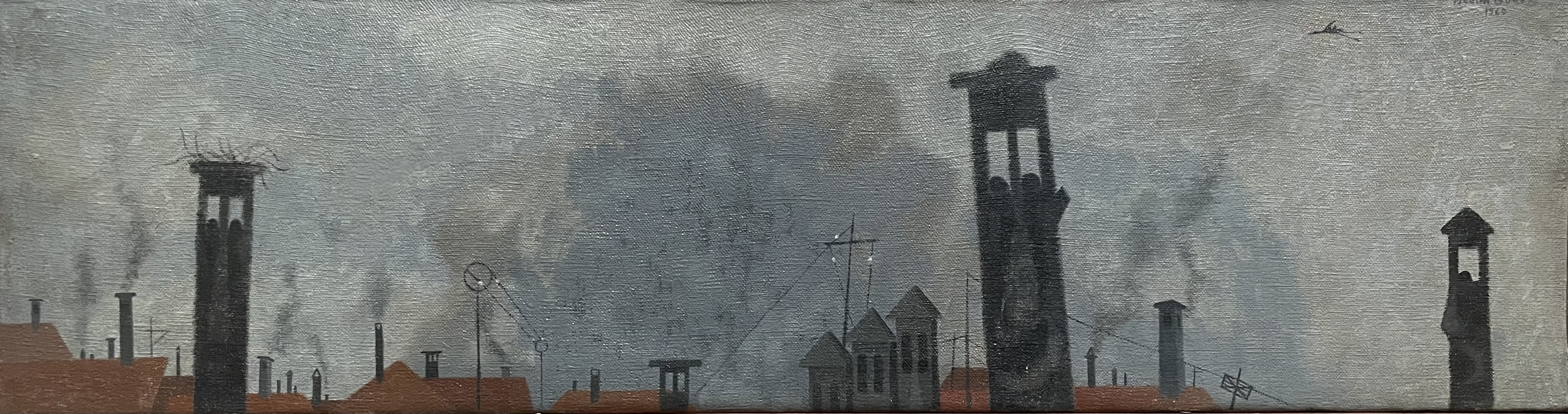
Chimneys (1960) by Nedim Günsür (1924–1994)

== During the 70s ==
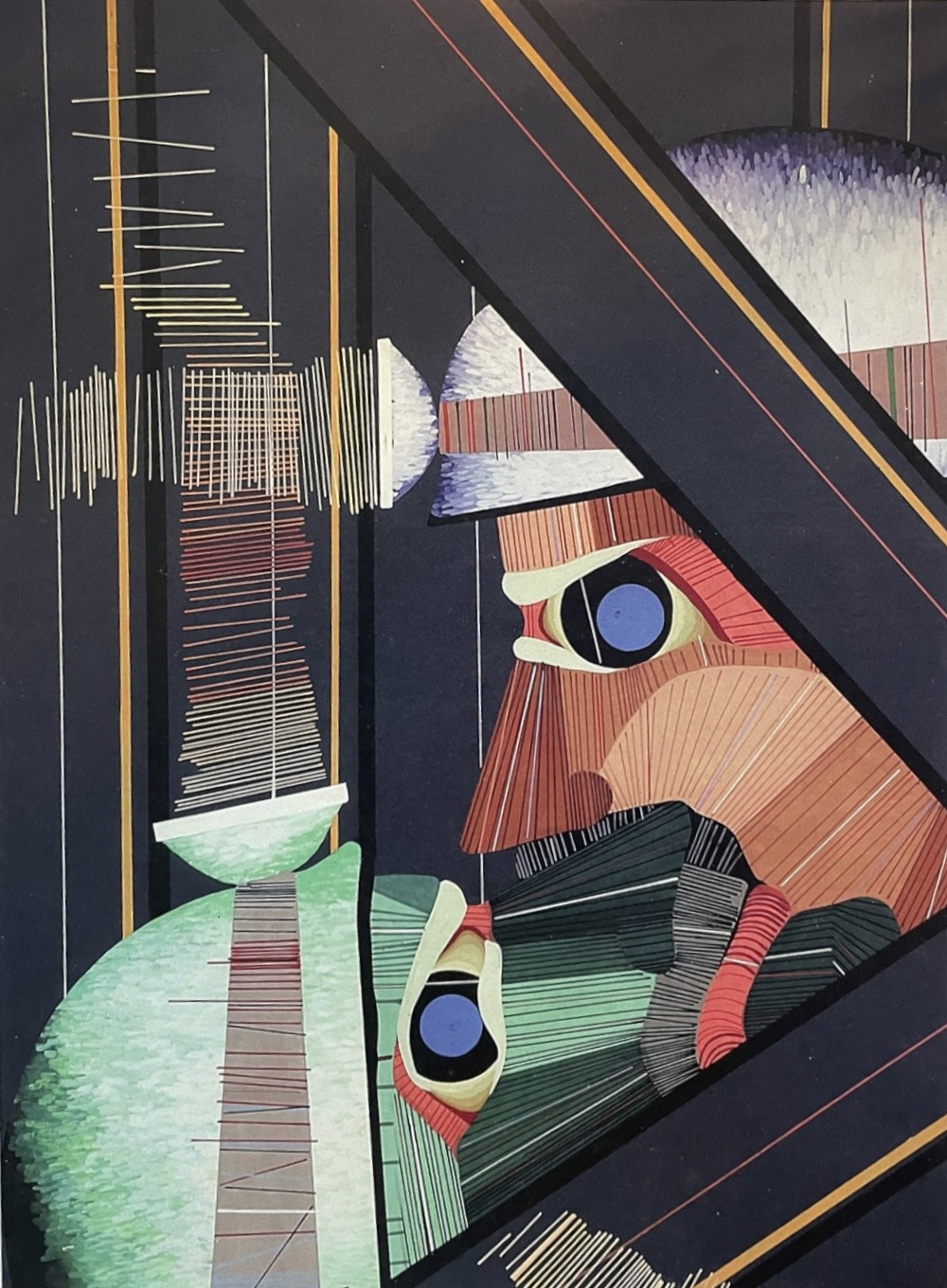
Mağdenciler by Yılmaz Demirağ

== Social Realists ==
- Seyyit Bozdoğan
- Cihat Aral
- Kasım Koçak
- Aydın Ayan
- Kemal İskender
- Hüsnü Koldaş
- Nedret Sekban
- TurgutAtalay
- Mehmet Aksoy

== During the 70s and after ==
Predominant painters with Fantastic tendencies:

- Balkan Naci İslimyeli
- Ergin İnan
- Burhan Uygur
- Yüksel Tamtekin

Contemporary Painters:

- Haluk Akakce (born 1970)
- Bedri Baykam (born 1957)
- Setenay Ozbek (born 1961) writer, artist and documentary maker.
- Genco Gulan (born 1969) contemporary conceptual artist and theorist.
- Nedim Günal
- Nedim Gürsür
- Hayal Pozanti (born 1983) painter of data visualization, based in the United States.

== See also ==
- Turkish art
- Turkish women in fine arts
