= Ercüment =

Ercüment is a Turkish given name for males. People named Ercüment include:

- Ercüment Aslan, Turkish boxer
- Ercument Kalmik, Turkish painter
- Ercüment Olgundeniz, Turkish athlete
- Ercüment Sunter, Turkish former national basketballer

Another name of Ercüment would be Ercument.
