= Ferik İbrahim Pasha =

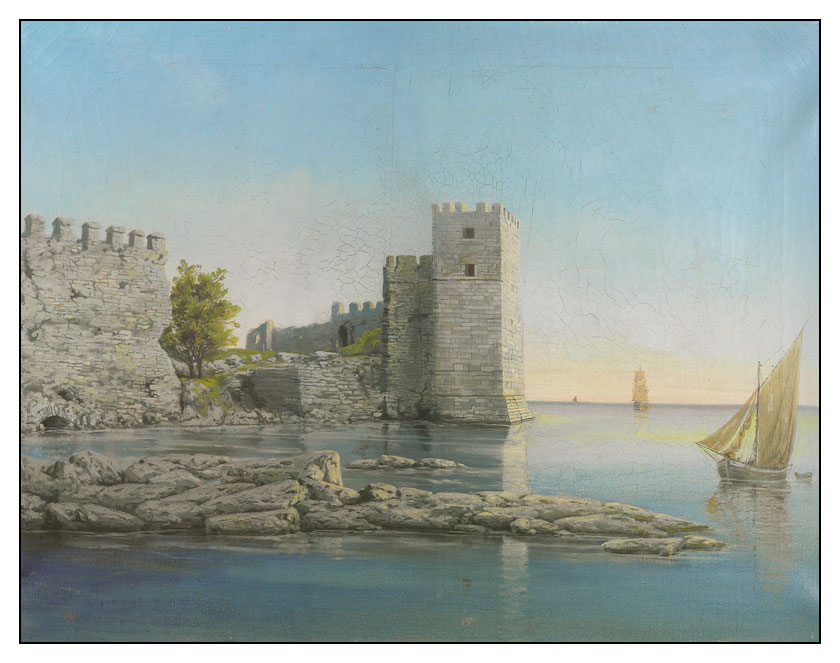
Fortress

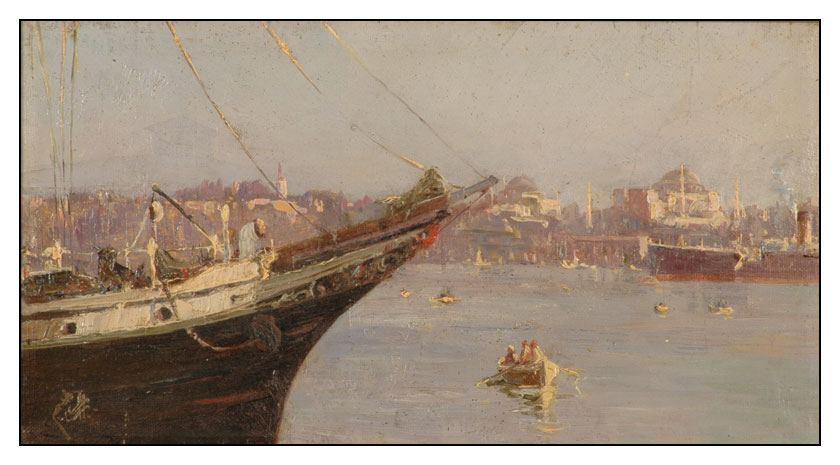
Istanbul Harbor

Ferik İbrahim Pasha (1815, Istanbul - 1891, Üsküdar) was a painter from the Ottoman Empire; one of the first to produce Western-style oil paintings.

== Biography ==
In 1835, he graduated from the "Mühendishane-i Berr-i Hümâyun", now known as Istanbul Technical University, and was one of two art students chosen to be sent to Europe for further studies. It is known for certain that he went to Vienna, and may have visited London as well. During this period, his fellow students were largely graduates of the Turkish Military Academy. According to Halil Bey's book Elvahı Nakşiye he had produced many paintings most of which were purchased by Şeker Ahmed Pasha.

It is not known when he returned from Europe, but he gave lessons at the court of Sultan Abdülmecid I, eventually attained the rank of Lieutenant General (Korgeneral) and became a member of the Supreme Military Council.

During much of his career, the Classical styles were preferred, especially for portraits. He was briefly exiled to Bursa after executing a realistic portrait of the Sultan that showed his smallpox scars. Most of İbrahim's works are landscapes and still-lifes. Mırati Mühendislikhane and Elvah-ı Nakşiye Collection register İbrahim Pasha as the first Turkish Painter.

== See also ==
- History of Modern Turkish painting
