= Siyah Qalam =

Collection of 14th century ink drawings

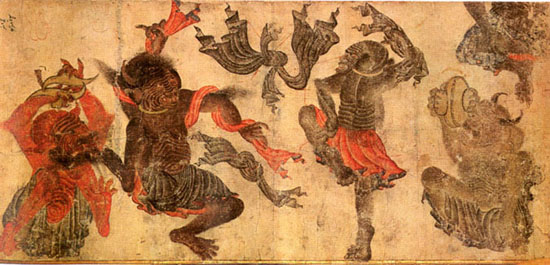
Folio 64, recto; Demons and the dead in ritualistic dance. This scene shows Buddhist influence, especially in the flowing drapery, and wild rhythms of their dance

The album of Muḥammad Siyāh Qalam or Siāh-Qalam (lit. 'the Black Pen'; Persian: محمد سیاه‌ قَلَم; Turkish: Mehmed Siyah Kalem), comprises around 80 extant late 14th and early 15th century folio paintings, ink drawings (qalam-siāhi), and calligraphies, on various material, sometimes silk. The album that contains these paintings, most of which are signed as Mehmet or Muhammad Siyah Qalam, is called the Fatih. These paintings depict cultural and religious ritual norms of the time period, providing insight into the demographics of that era as well as the geography. Measuring up to 335 × 485 cm, these paintings are generally attributed to Iran and bear the strong influence of Chinese art and techniques, as well as symbols of Buddhism and Shamanism, which were both major faiths in Central Asia before the arrival of Islam.

In tone and theme, the images are a high point of Persian draftsmanship and include works from the Mozaffarid, Jalāyerid and Turkmen periods. They are sometimes attributed to the notname Ustad Siyah Qalam; equivalent in English to the Master of the Black Pen. There have been conflicting opinions about whether Siyah Qalam was an individual or a group of artists. This discourse arose because the artwork was created in a non-cohesive style, with the name "Siyah Qalam" written and positioned differently on each piece.

The figures depicted in the paintings span a variety of cultures: Iranian, Turkic, Chinese, Mongolic, and date to the century after the reign of Turco-Mongol conqueror Timur. Notable for their intrinsic quality, they depict diabolical imagery, everyday nomadic life in the Eurasian steppe, and contemporary culture's relationship with the dead.

The album is held at the Topkapi Saray Library, Istanbul; parts of the Diez Albums of the Berlin State Library are closely related.

== Attribution ==
Originally, the paintings and drawings in this collection were attributed to Muhammad Siyah Qalam. The works bear either hastily written jottings or elegant nastaliq attributions to the name, with some including the title of Ustad or “the Master,” showing that the artist held some status.

Identifying the notname has led to debate, with some associating Muhammad Siyah Qalam with a Herati painter, Hajji Muhammad. Others have identified Yaqub Beg’s court painters, Shaykhi and Darvish Muhammad, as contributors to the collection alongside Muhammad Siyah Qalam, while some suggest Darvish Muhammad and Muhammad Siyah Qalam may be one and the same. However, a broad scholarly consensus has formed around the idea that the paintings are likely the work of numerous individuals.

== Subject matter ==
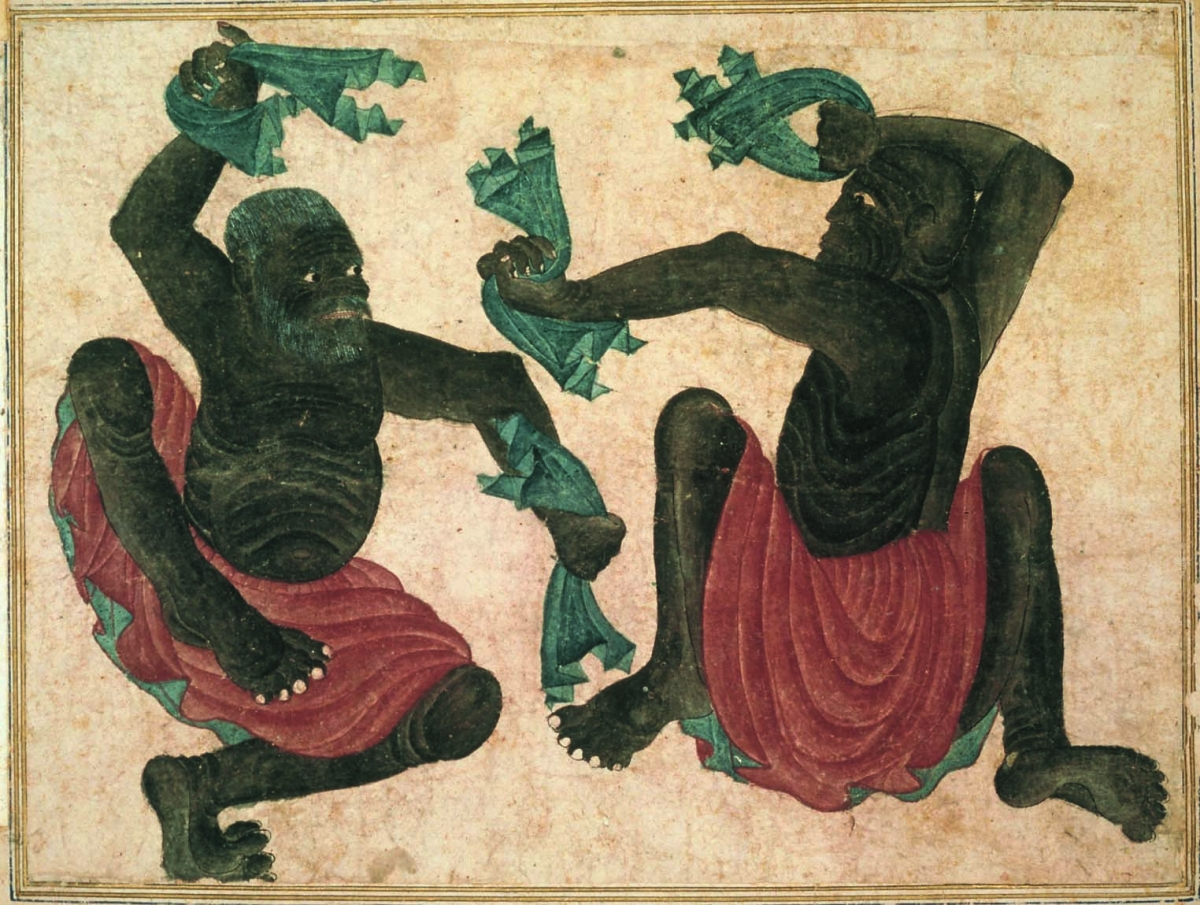
Dancing Men

Within the collection, there are depictions of demons, monsters, camp life, animals, fairy-like beings, and human figures in Chinese and Mongolian clothing. Alongside figural depictions are also details of nature (such as rocks and trees) which recur in Turkman court paintings of the Yaqub Beg period.

The more fantastical and intensely coloured images seem to conjure the devastation and bleakness of Genghis Khan's reign. The images contain dark colours, heavy lines, and highly animated figures against a blank background, using unsized, unpolished paper and a limited range of colours.

The compositions are highly expressive, and a number of figures are engaged in ecstatic ritual or dance. The fantastical monsters are drawn from local Pre-Islamic Central Asian folklore, bearing resemblance to beings of Indian, Chinese and Middle Eastern legend, as Central Asia lies on the cultural crossroad between the Middle East, South Asia and East Asia. Many of the earthly scenes depict everyday life in the Central Asian Steppes as lived by various ethnic people, most prominent the Turkic and Iranian; washing clothes, blowing fire on a cooker, hanging lines of bows and arrows. Furthermore, a drawing in the Siyah Qalam collection seems to be an adaptation of a European painting of Hercules strangling a lion. The living wear various head-dresses and costumes and carry a variety of tools and weapons, and engage in different rituals.

It is widely agreed among scholars that the illustrations were originally arranged in a specific sequence on a scroll and were possibly accompanied by narration when presented. Experts have examined the paintings and determined that they were cut from a single scroll and haphazardly reattached.

Several features in the illustrations are linked to Jalāyirid painting, particularly to the Great Jalāyirid Šāhnāma, an unfinished manuscript whose illustrations are also scattered across multiple albums. The miniatures were influenced by Chinese art, both in their sinuous lines and fluid rhythms, and in the figures' dress in that country's traditional dress. The works are of historical interest for their depictions of the everyday life of the faded world of historic Central Asia, including descriptions of tools, costumes, rituals, headdresses, and the treatment of domesticated animals.

The cultic acts, especially the ecstatic movement of the dancing figures, filled with emotion and vehement gestures, display winding and twisted limb motifs that are also seen in Buddhist and Islamic paintings.

== Iconography ==
The sources for the drawings are uncertain; various parts may be influenced by the Shahnameh and the biblical Solomon. Other drawings made against blank backgrounds (such as the encampment) may at first seem to be parts of a coherent series, but on closer inspection could be individual studies. In addition, given their often disparate size, their precise function cannot be determined with much certainty, though it might be that they were intended as aids to storytelling, to Royal elites.

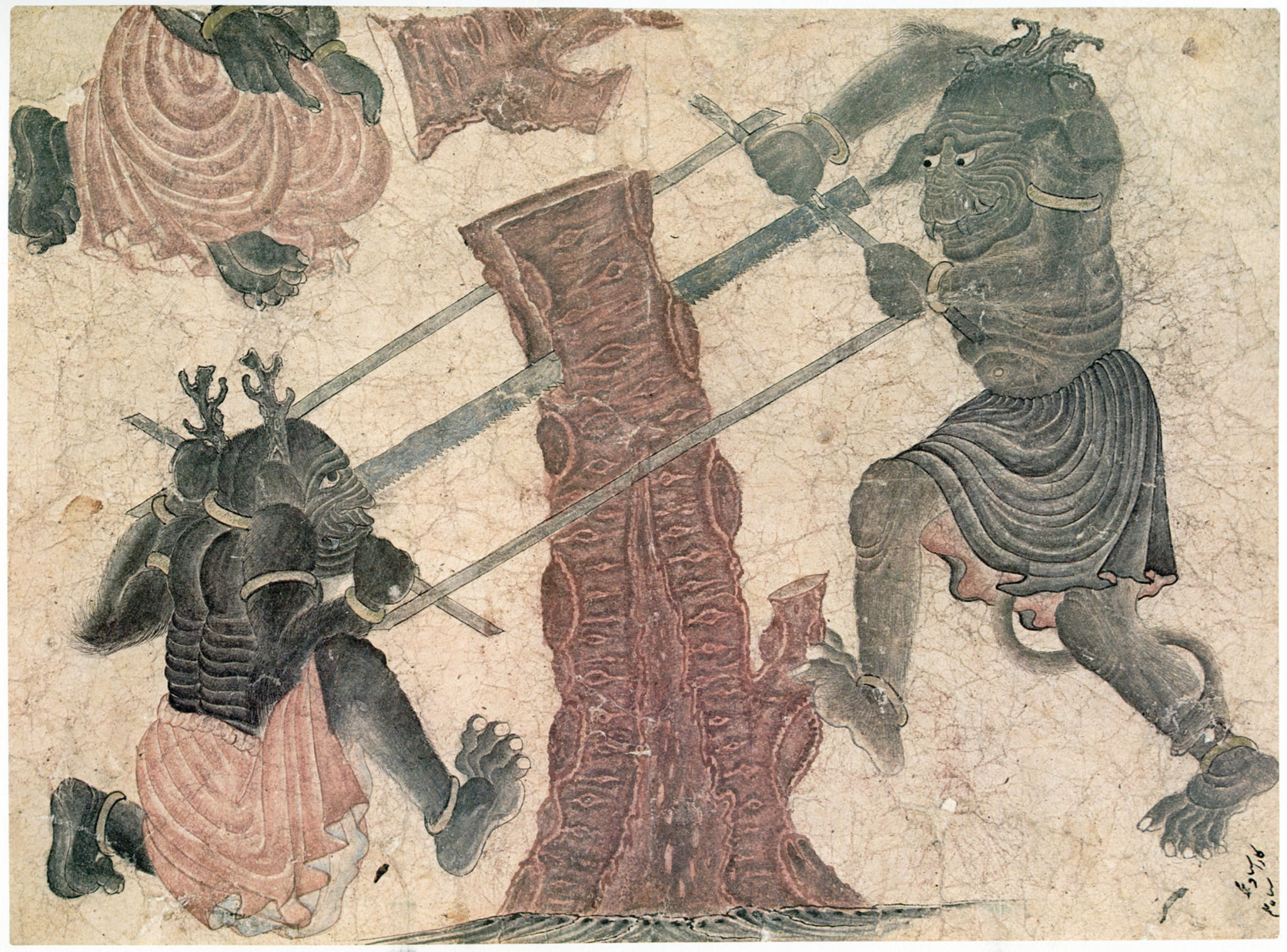
Demons Sawing a Tree

The paintings of demons (or div) are mostly contained in album H. 2153, these demons are often depicted performing human actions such as sawing trees, drinking, and playing musical instruments. The demons are semi-naked, often wearing short skirts and barefoot, with some having long scarves over their shoulders. Some have argued that the accessories these demons wear- necklaces, earrings, pendants, or wrist and ankle bracelets- show a relation to Sufism, perhaps making the works a critique of Sufis during a historical period of political turmoil, uncertainty, and changes of power.

The choice to depict demons throughout the paintings was to present them as negative entities that instil danger in the community. Influences from the Shahnameh and the biblical Solomon alluded to the North as the domain of demons, with Siyah Qalam suggesting a connection to the Sufis (who originated in the north).

== Provenance ==
Muhammad Siyah Qalam is believed to have lived somewhere in the Qipchaq steppe, either in Moghulistan, Turkestan, or Eastern Anatolia. Siyah Qalam’s paintings, with their strange iconography, were directly impacted by the environmental space the artist was surrounded by. The influence on Siyah Qalam’s paintings could include aspects of Turkmen, Chinese, Persian, and Mongolian culture, indicating an eastern provenance. Despite speculation about the life and work of the painter, or painters, who painted in this style, the aesthetic and inspiration certainly originates from the various schools of painting most recognizable from the region of Central or Southwest Asia.

The extant leaves are taken from a number of scrolls that were transferred in the course of wars and land occupations. The extant leaves are recorded in inventories in Istanbul and in the library of Topkapi Palace of Sultan Selim I as treasure from his 1514 Persian adventure.

In 1910, Siyah Qalam's paintings were displayed in an exhibition of Islamic art in Munich. Since that exhibition, various scholars have attempted to pinpoint when and where the artist surfaced, with a variety of viewpoints advanced.

== Gallery ==
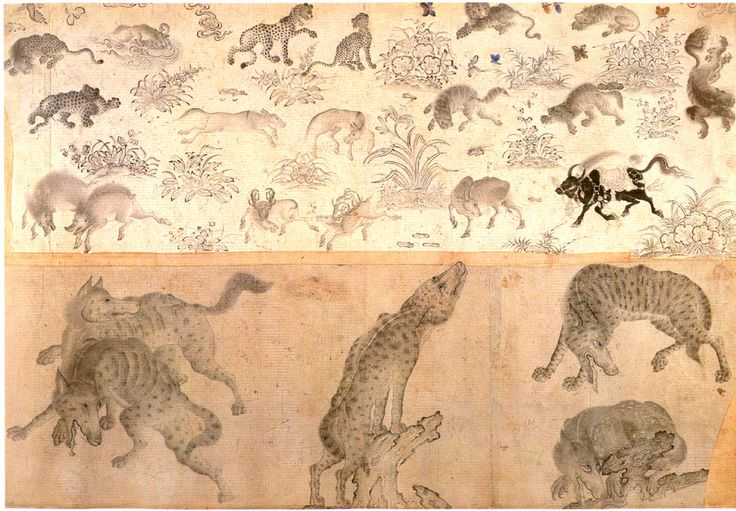
Daily life of nomads, including men washing clothes, starting a cooking fire and carrying bows and arrows

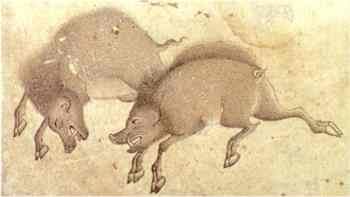
Study of Boars at battle

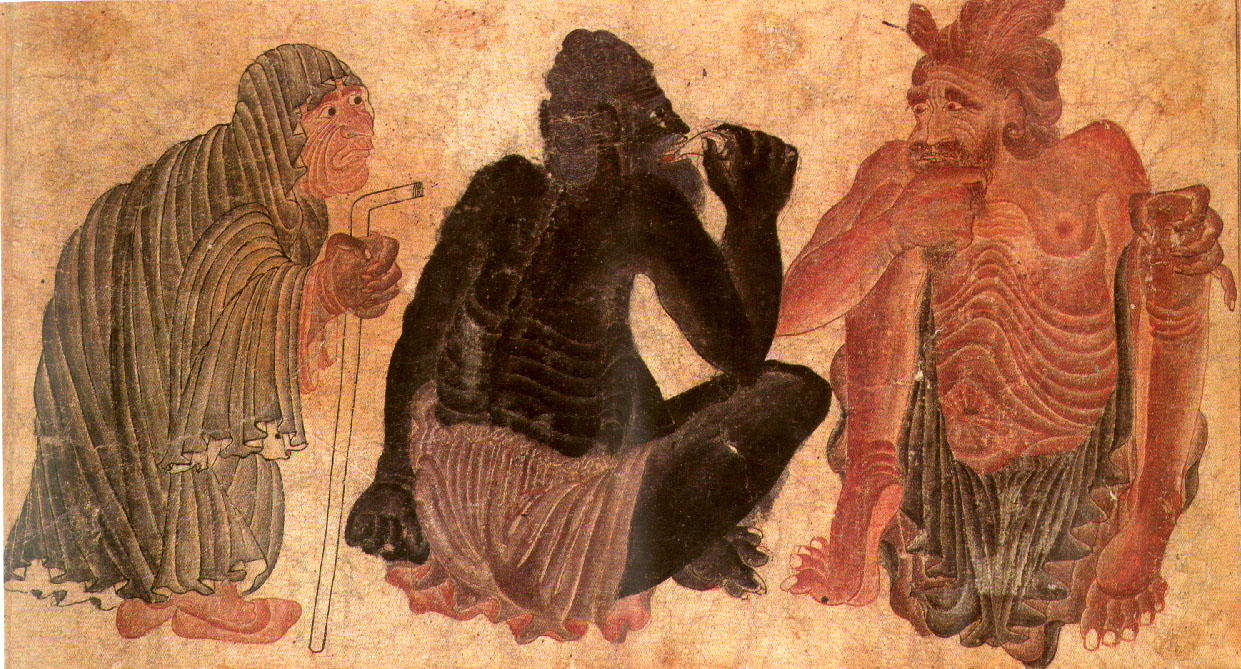
Folio 90, recto; Performance Scene, African

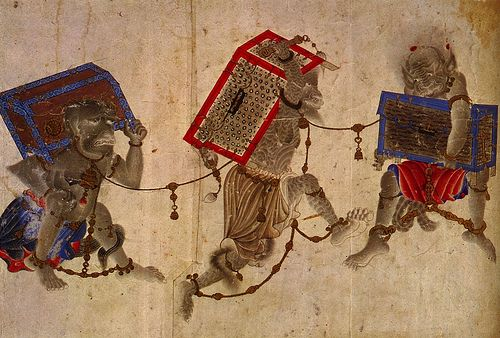
Folio; Demons, the dead and the living at battle

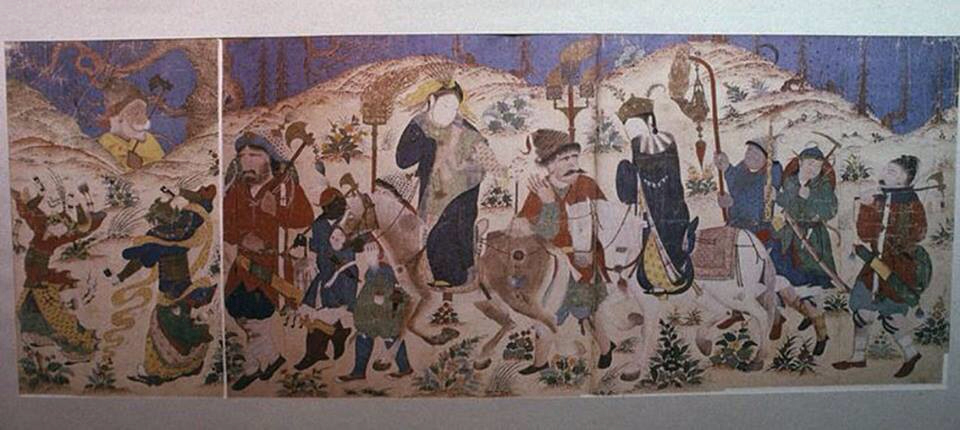
Caravan

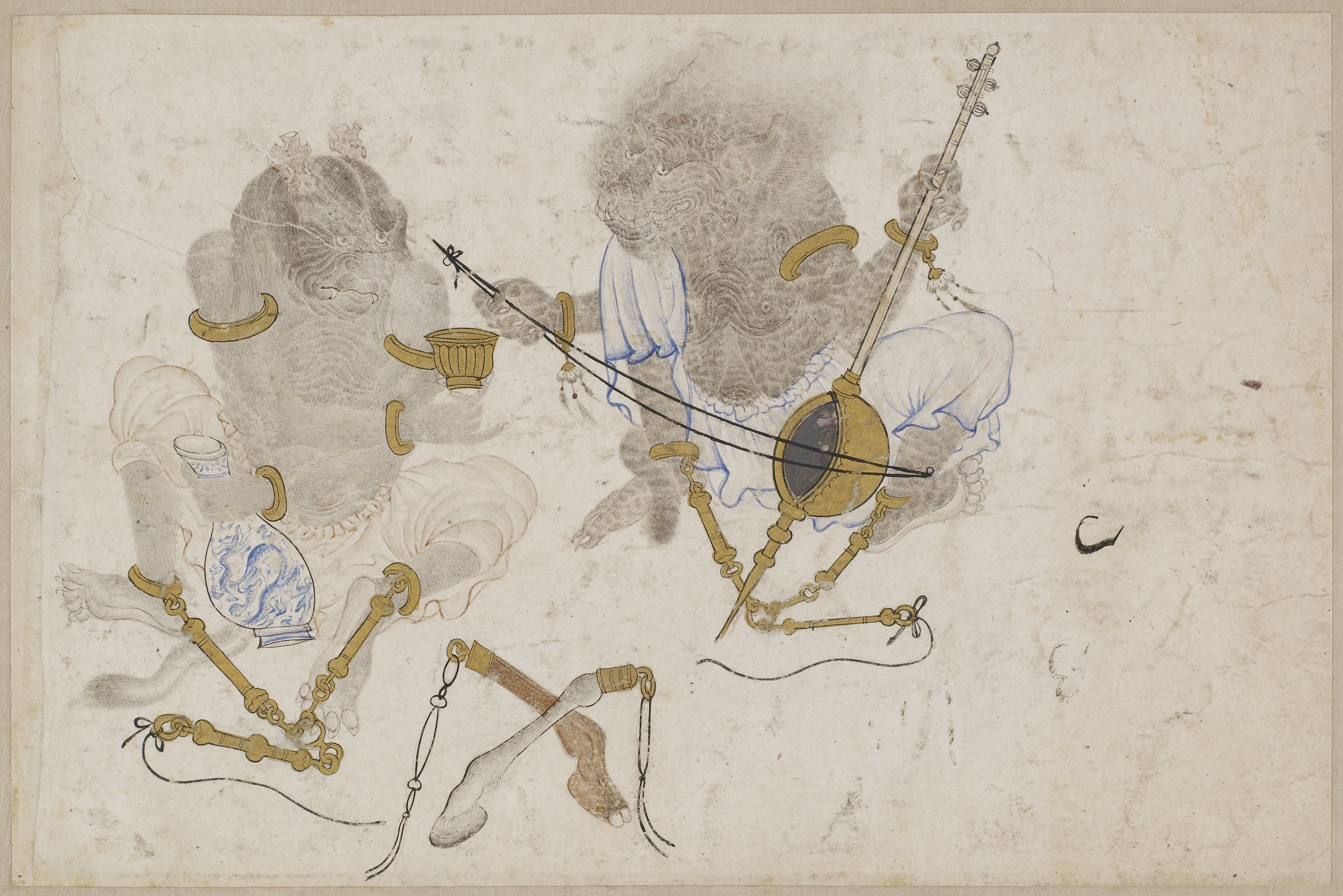

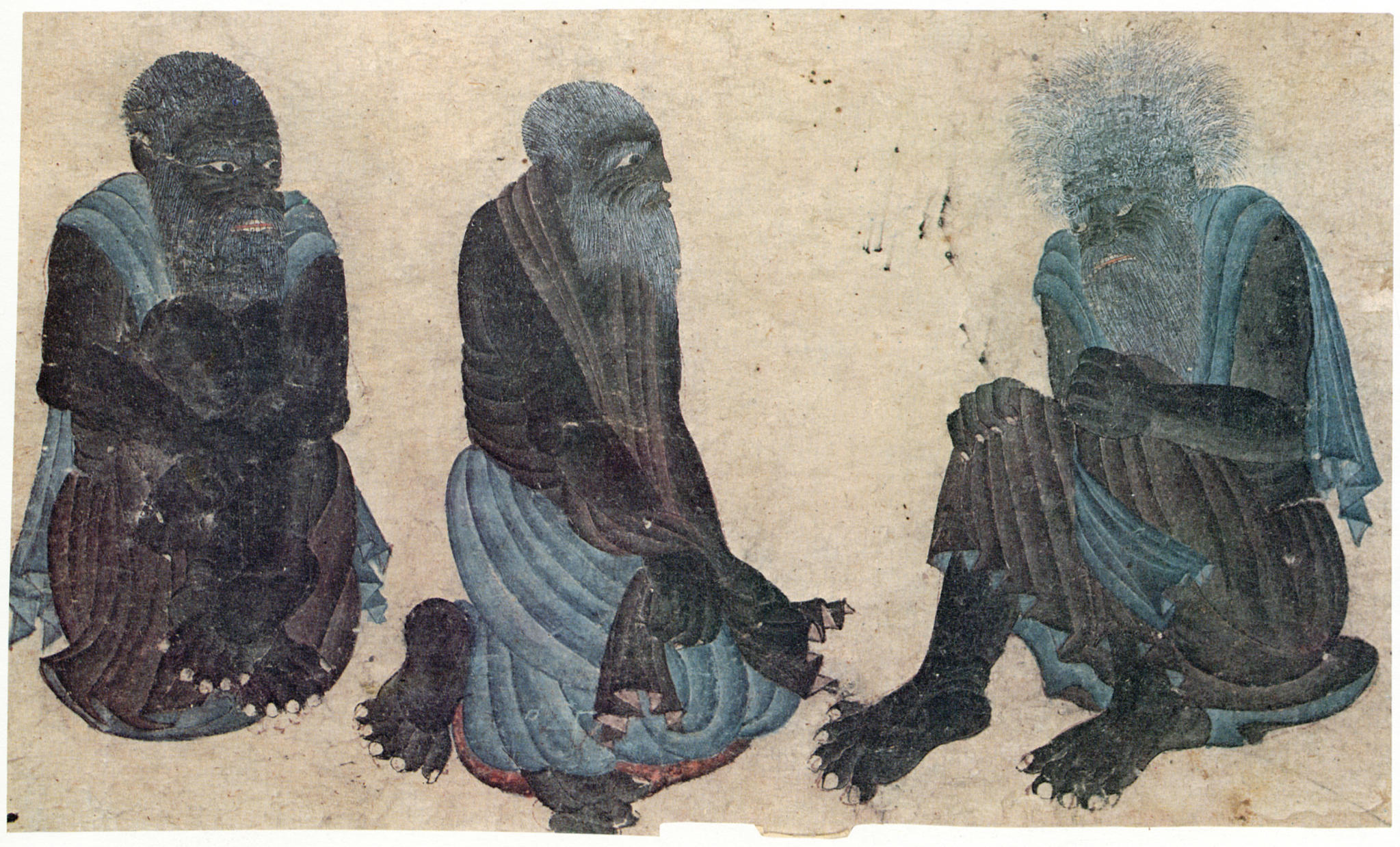

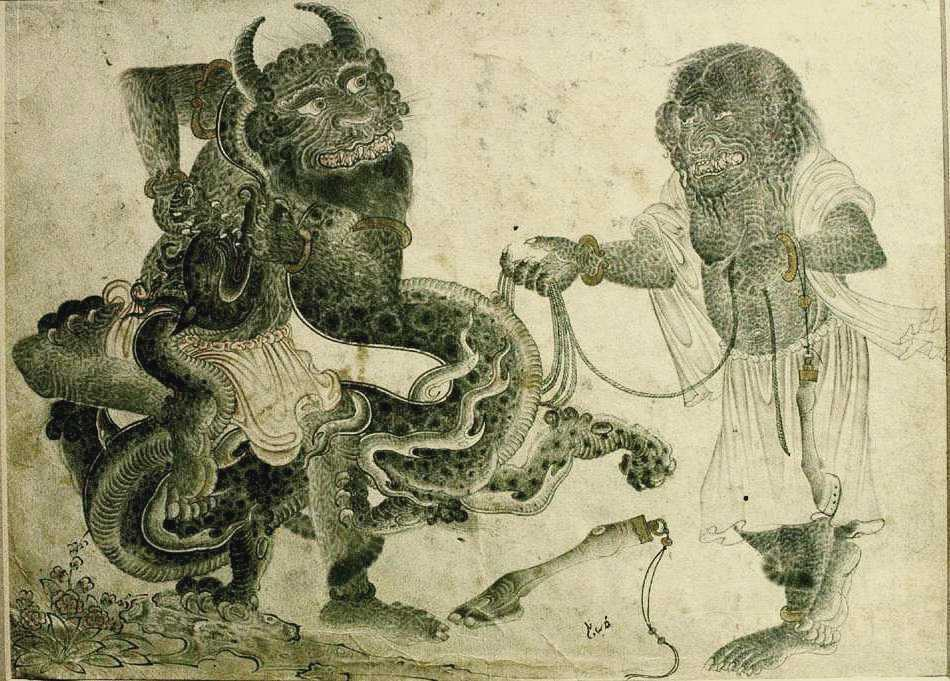
Two Demons Binding a Captured Dragon

Demon in Chains

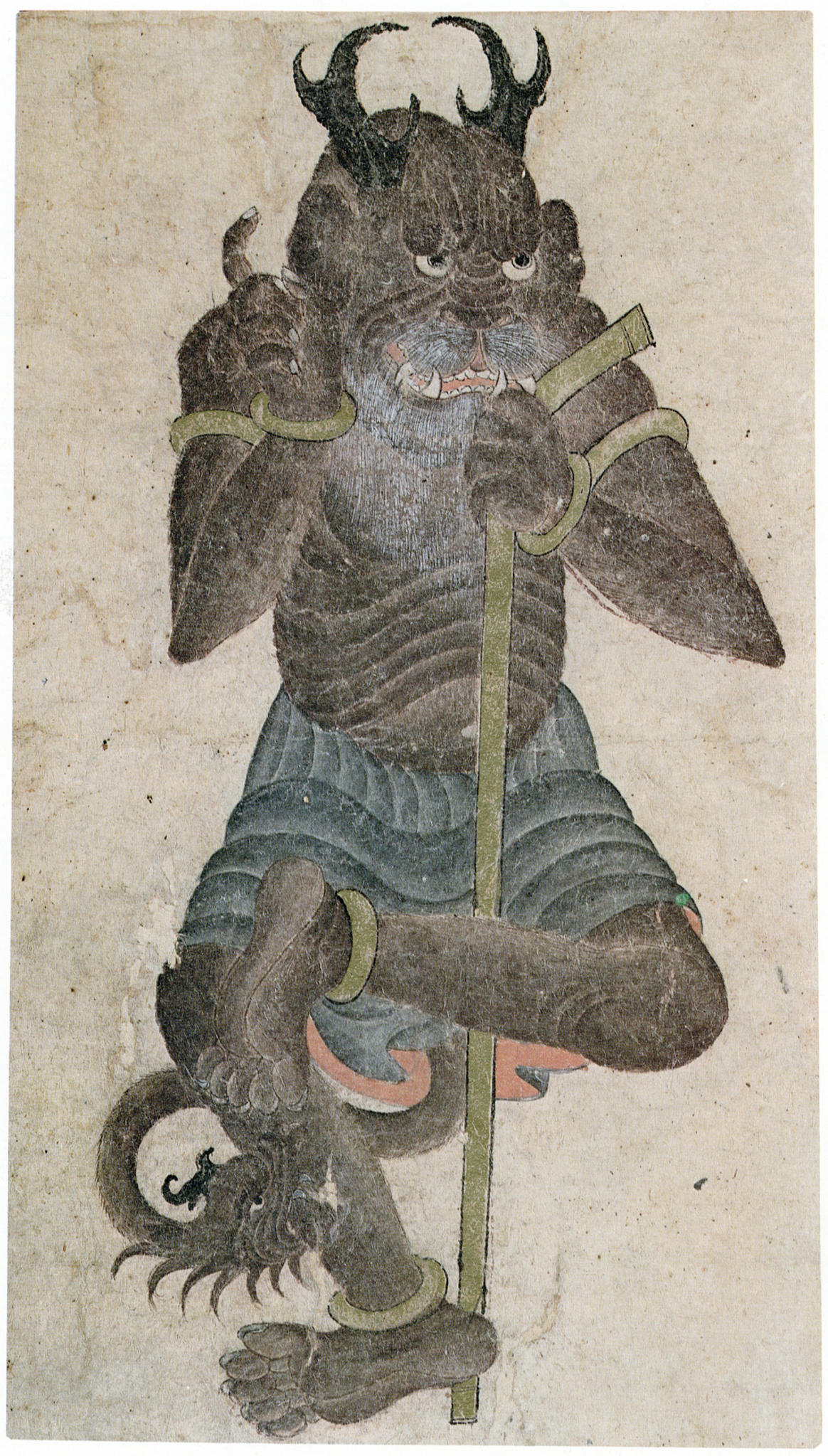
Demon Standing and Speaking in Reproach

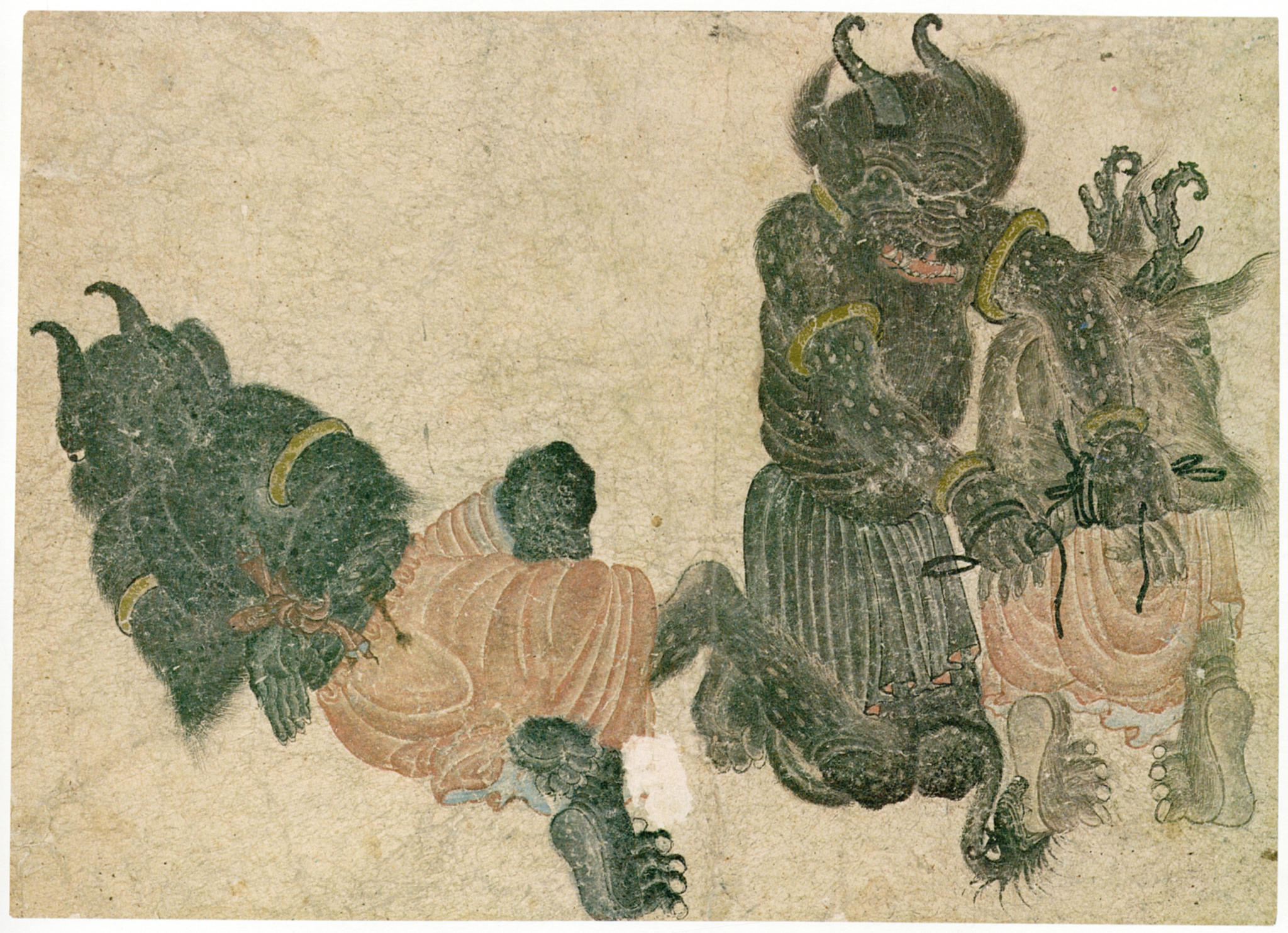

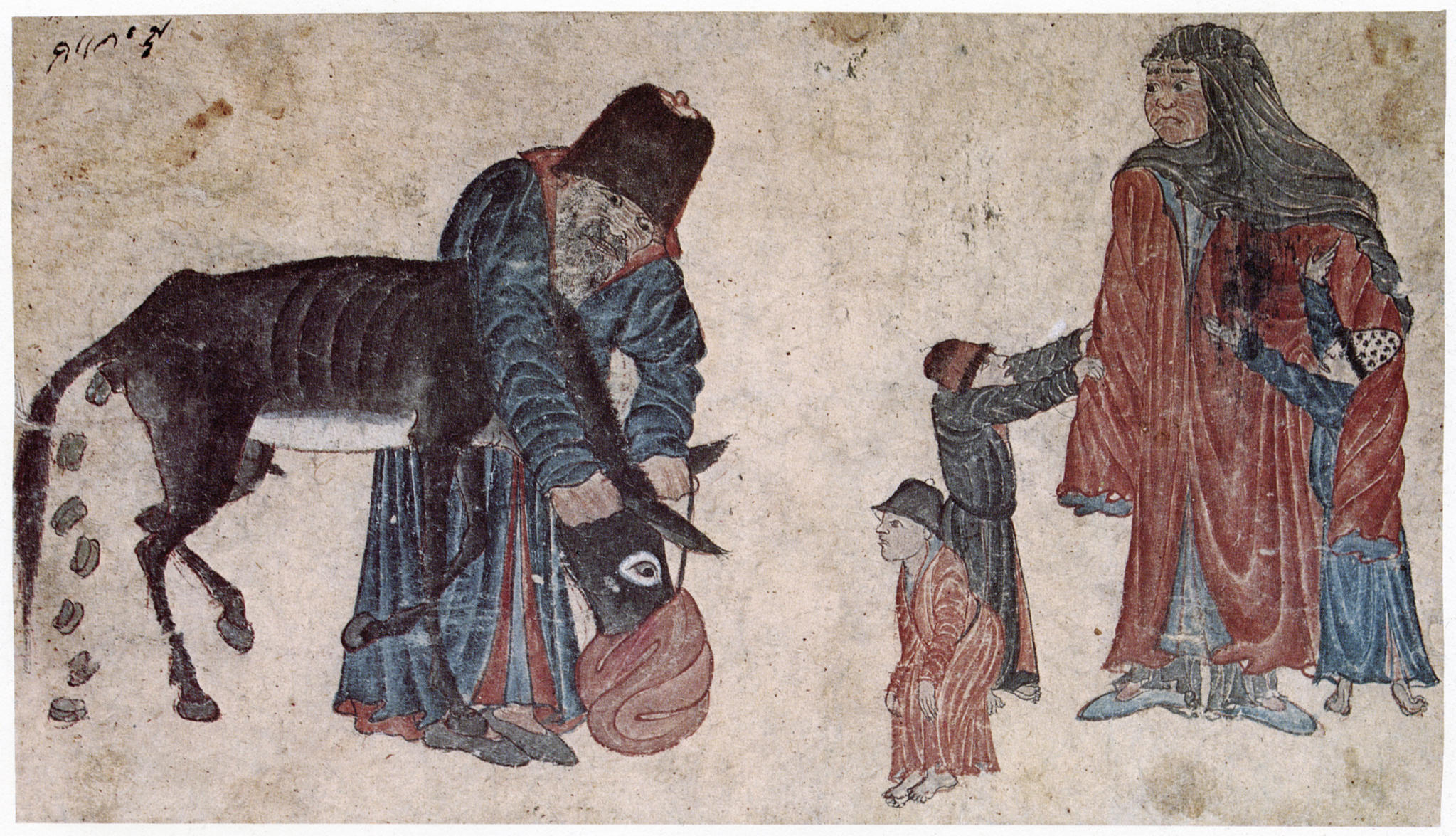

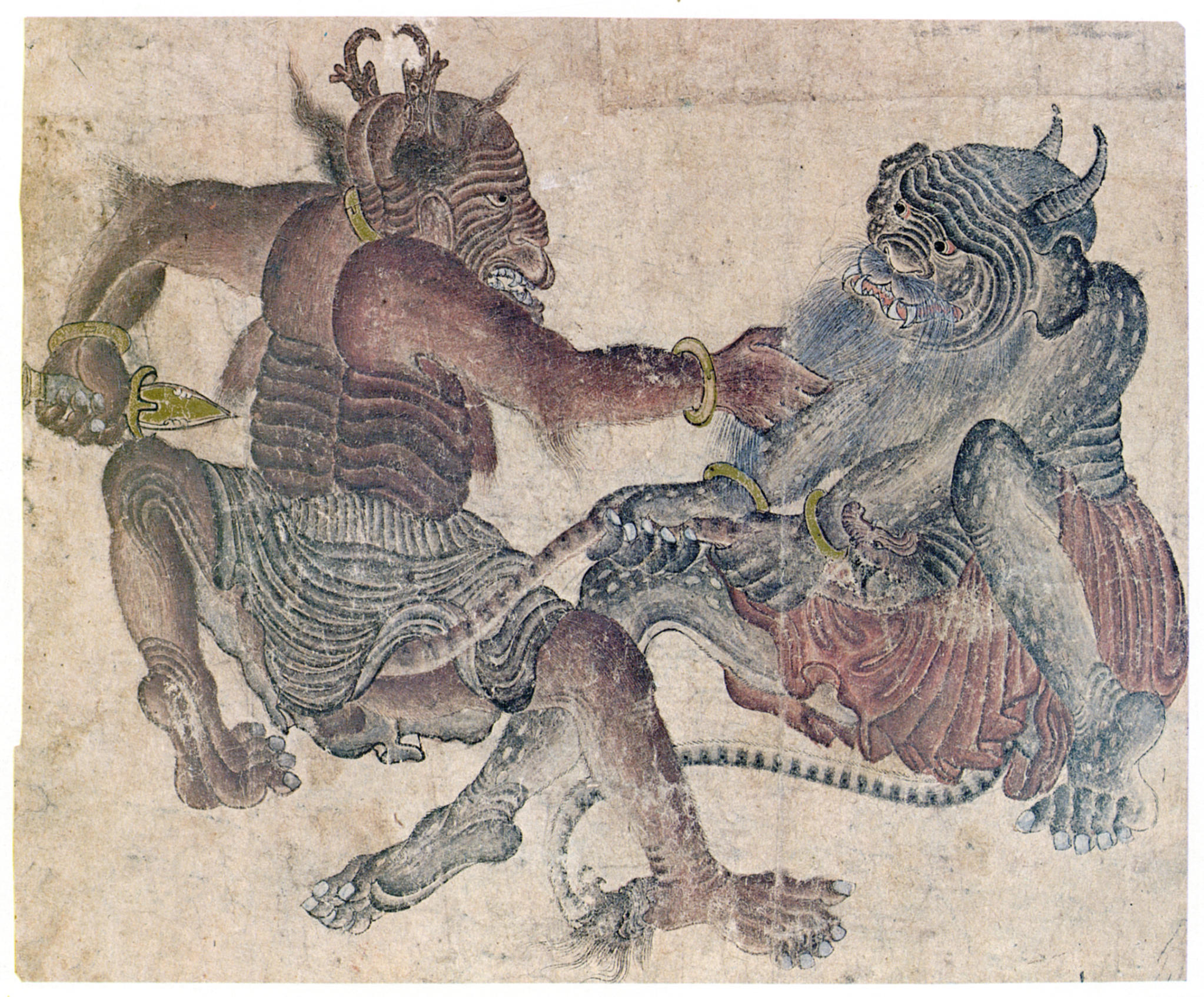

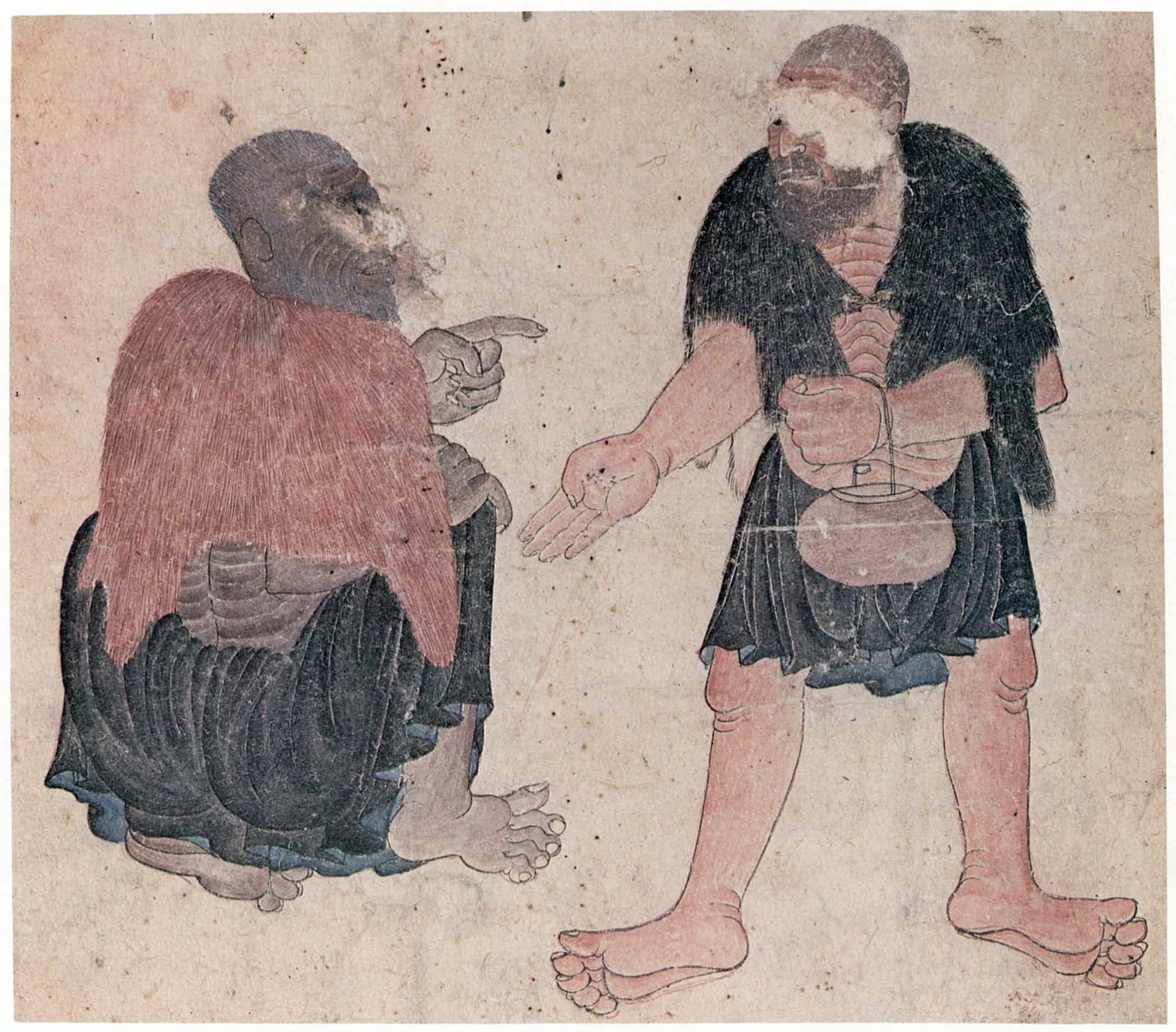

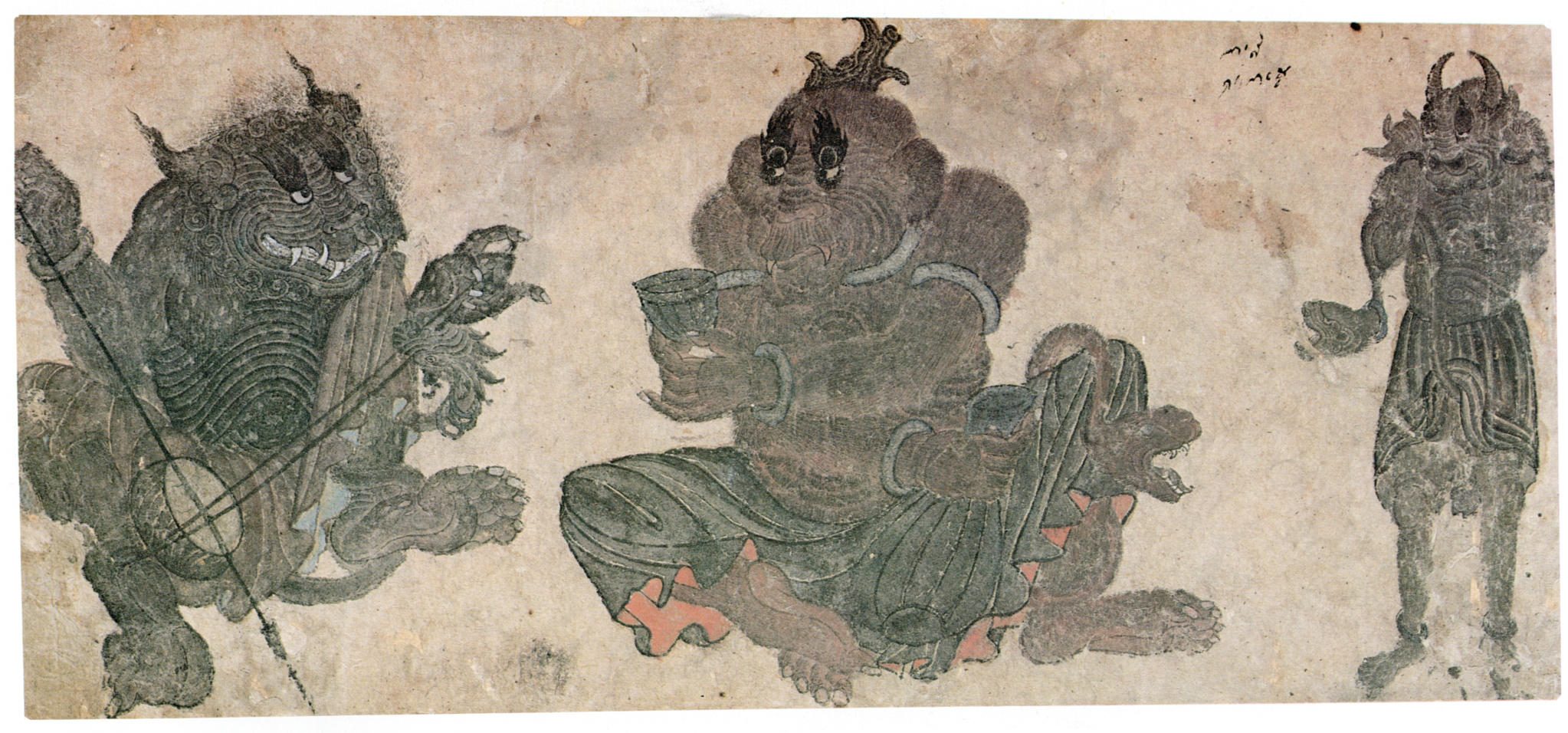
Demons at an Entertainment

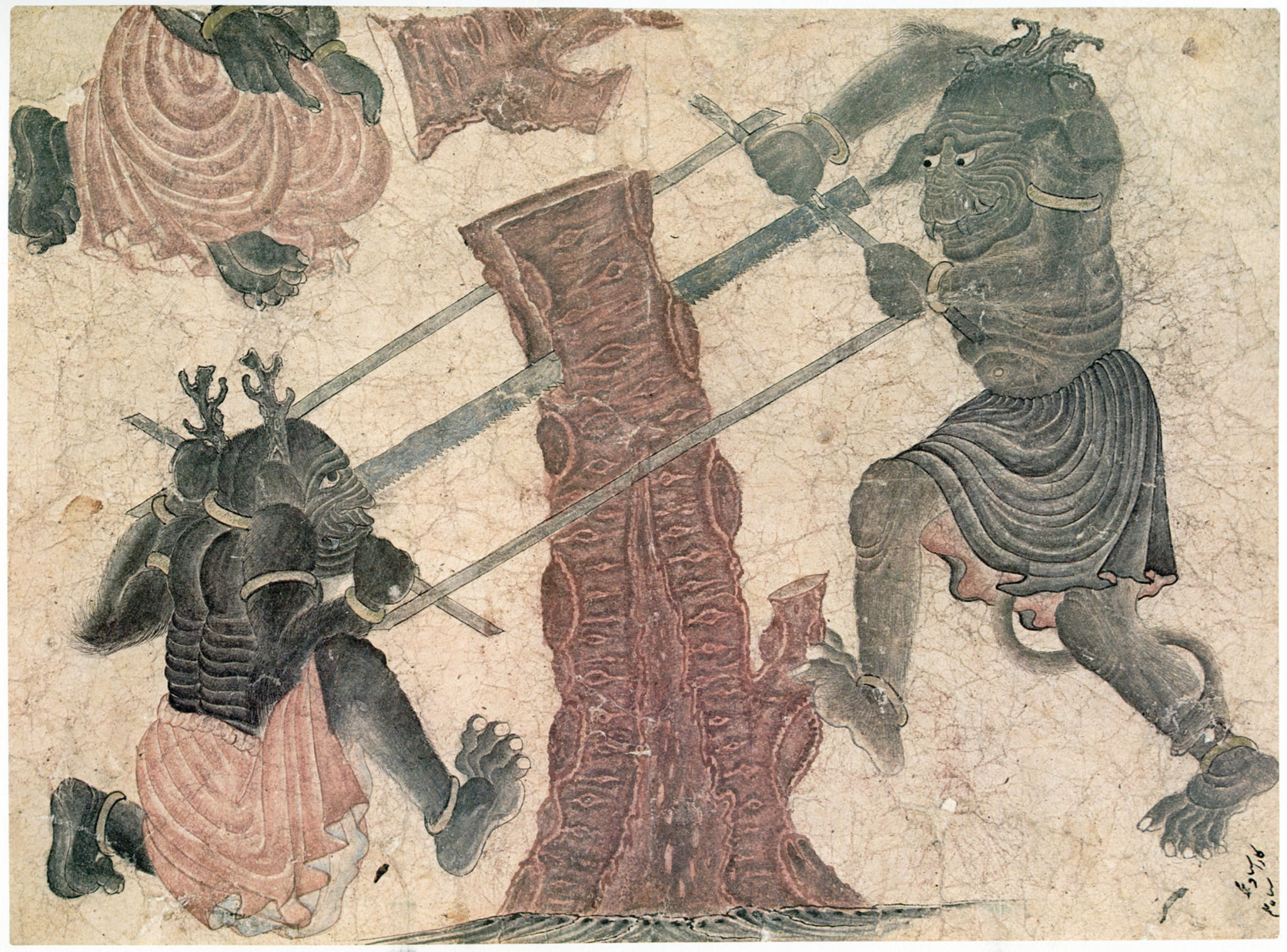
Demons Sawing a Tree

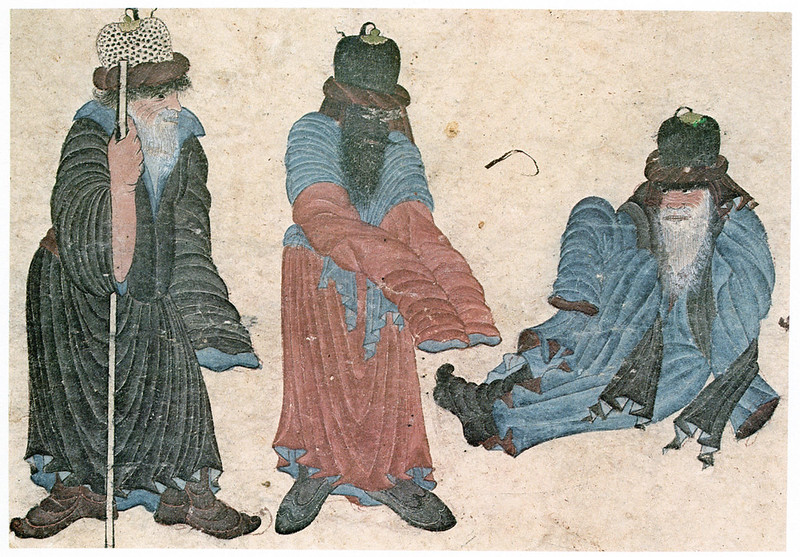
Disguised Demon
