= Ercument Kalmik =

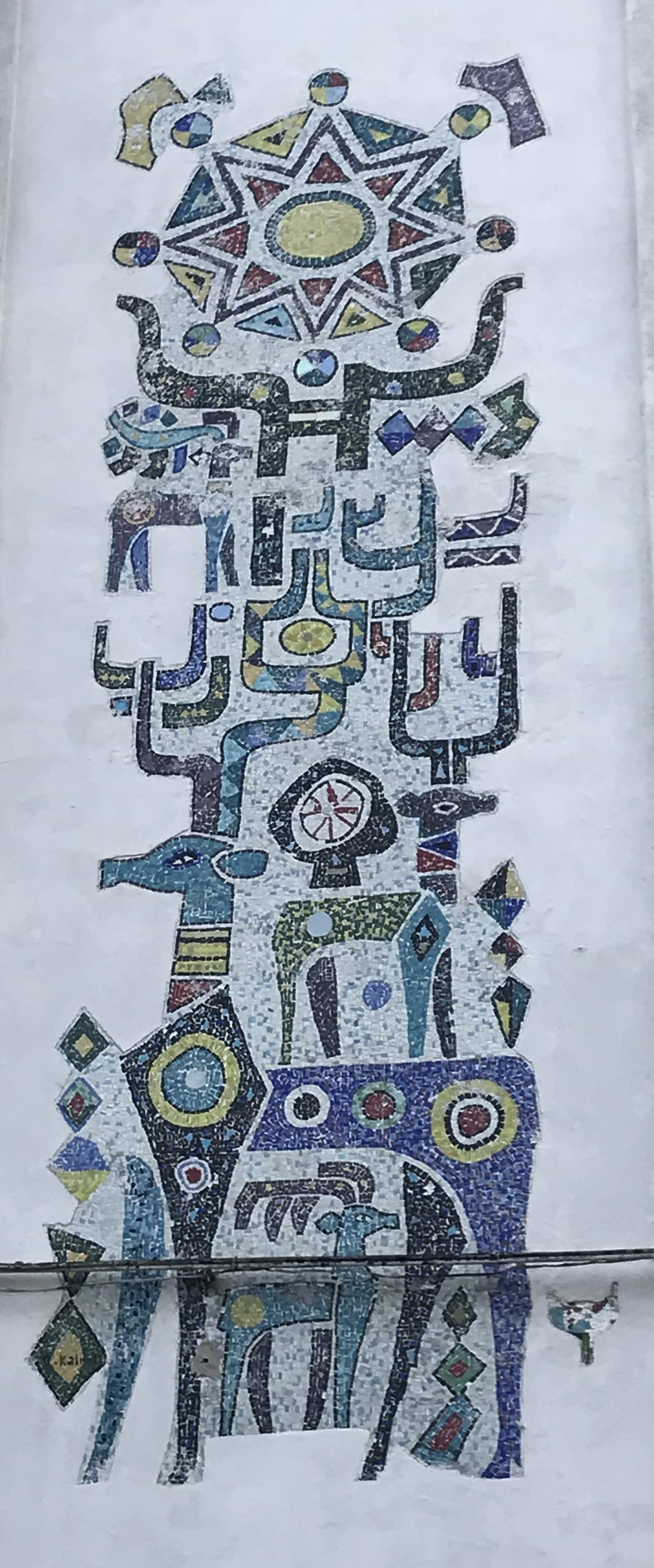
Ercument Kalmik mosaic in 4.Levent Istanbul

Ercüment Kalmık (1909 in Istanbul – February 21, 1971 in Istanbul) was an artist and art historian, known for his work in studying the lyrical-abstract Turkish painters.

Ercument Kalmik's Liman Kompozisyon (Harbour Composition)

== Biography ==
After completing high school at the Galata Scottish Mission, Kalmik studied in the Department of Painting at the Academy of Fine Arts from 1929 and worked in the ateliers of Nazmi Ziya and Ibrahim Calli. While still a student he also worked at the Cumhuriyet newspaper. Between 1933 and 1935, he completed his military service. He graduated from the Academy in 1937, and in 1939, went to Paris to study painting in André Lhote's studio while also taking some courses in art history at the Sorbonne University. After returning to Turkey in 1940, he taught at various high schools in Ankara and Istanbul (1942–47). He returned to the army in 1941, and completed his service in 1942.

In 1947, he began to teach composition in the Istanbul Technical University Faculty of Architecture. In 1954, he visited Italy. In 1962, he took part in the Sao Paulo Bienale. Then, between 1967 and 1968, he was a guest lecturer in basic design at Technische Universität Berlin.

Originally influenced by Impressionism, Kalmık later became interested in European Cubism and was influenced by Braque, Picasso, Fernand Léger and Henri Matisse. After returning to Turkey he maintained an interest in figurative abstraction and developed a strong sense of pattern. During the 1960s many of his works featured fishermen and boats in front of abstract landscapes. Kalmik is known for his etchings as well as his prints. He also produced some public mosaics, including the fine one on a wall in 4.Levent, Istanbul.

Kalmik participated in many group and solo exhibitions both domestically and abroad. Some of his works are on display in the Istanbul Painting and Sculpture Museum as well as in the Ankara Paintinga nd Sculpture Museum and in private collections.

Istanbul Technical University published his two books, "Systems of Colour Harmony" and "Textures in Nature and Art" in the 1950s.

In 1997, his wife, Ayşe Kalmik, converted their Art Nouveau-style wooden house in Gümüşsuyu in Istanbul into a museum now run by the Ercüment Kalmık Foundation.

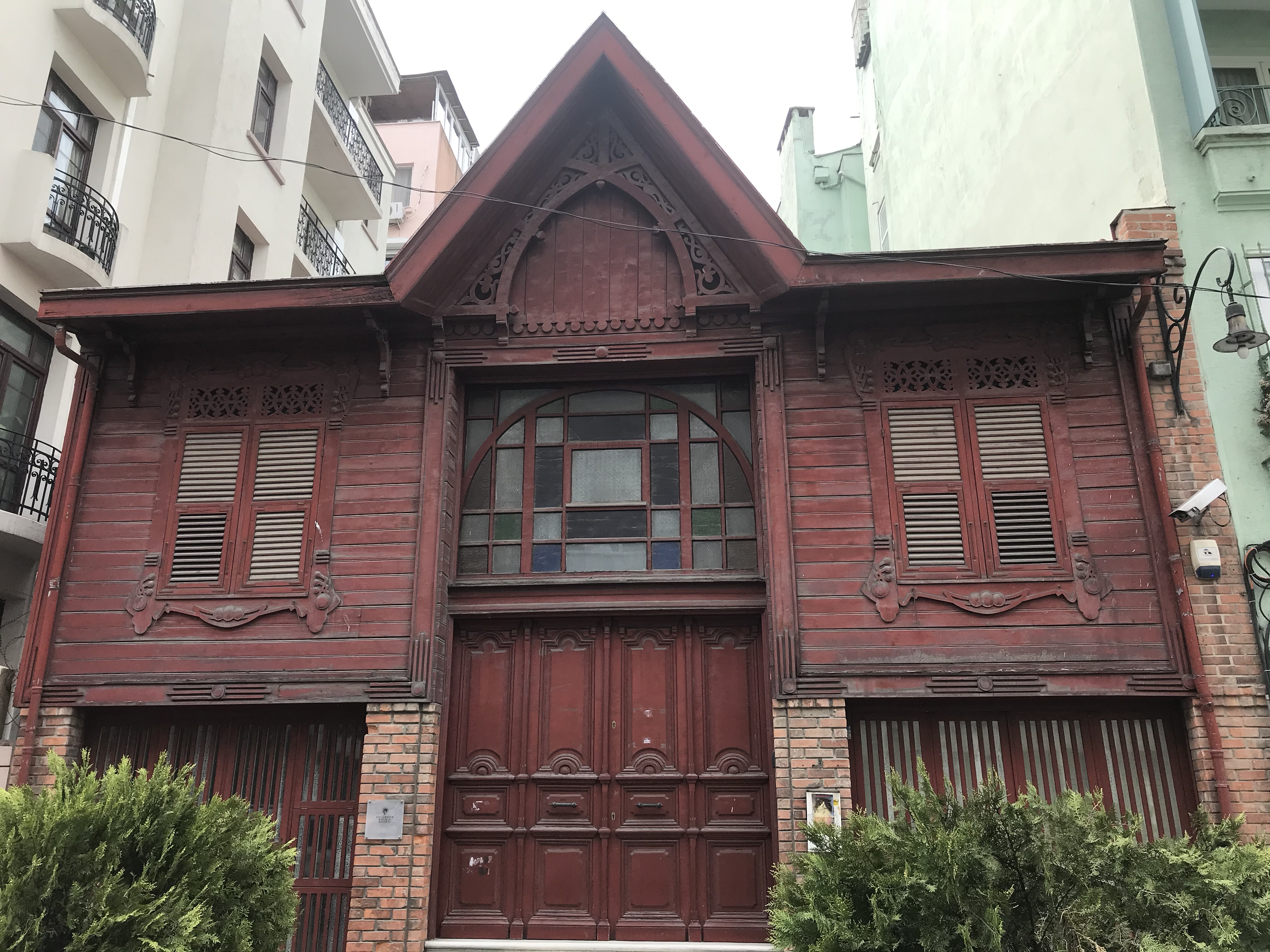
Ercument Kalmik's house in Gümüşsuyu, İstanbul
