= Muhittin Sebati =

Turkish painter

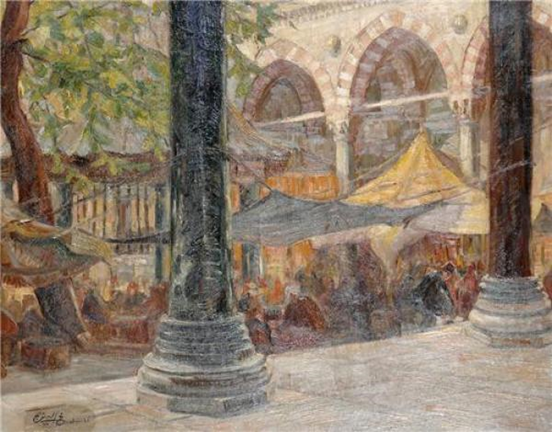
Beyazit Mosque; Used Book Bazaar

Muhittin Sebati (1901, Amasya - 1932, Istanbul) was a Turkish Post-Impressionist painter and sculptor.

== Biography ==
He was orphaned at an early age. After a brief period in the public schools, he entered the Darüşşafaka Association school in 1908 and studied there until 1920. After attending one of the Galatasaray exhibitions, he developed an interest in art and eventually enrolled at the "Sanayi-i Nefise Mektebi" (School of Fine Arts), where his instructors were Hikmet Onat and İbrahim Çallı. In 1922, he had his first exhibition at the Galatasaray.

In 1925, he was awarded a scholarship to study in Paris. He attended the Académie Julian, where he worked with Paul Albert Laurens, and the Ecolé des Arts Décoratifs, where he studied sculpture with Paul Landowski and Hippolyte Lefèbvre. He returned to Turkey in 1928.

That same year, he began teaching at the Ankara Boys' High School (apparently an obligation for receiving the scholarship) and participated in the "Birinci Genç Ressamlar Sergisi" (First exhibition of young artists) at the Ethnography Museum of Ankara in 1929. Later that year, he returned to Istanbul and became one of the founders of the "Independent Painters and Sculptors Association" and was elected its first president. He had an especially successful showing at an exhibition held by the "Türk Ocakları" (Turkish Hearths).

In 1931, he was diagnosed with tuberculosis and died early the following year at Haydarpaşa Hospital.
