= Prose of Turkey =

History of prose in Turkey since 1911

Prose of the Republic of Turkey covers the "Turkish Prose" beginning with 1911 with the national literature movement.

Stylistically, the prose of the early years of the Republic of Turkey was essentially a continuation of the National Literature movement, with Realism and Naturalism predominating. This trend culminated in the 1932 novel Yaban ("The Strange"), by Yakup Kadri Karaosmanoğlu. This novel can be seen as the precursor to two trends that would soon develop: social realism, and the "village novel" (köy romanı). Çalıkuşu ("The Wren") by Reşat Nuri Güntekin addresses a similar theme with the works of Karaosmanoğlu. Güntekin's narrative has a detailed and precise style, with a realistic tone.

The social realist movement is perhaps best represented by the short-story writer Sait Faik Abasıyanık (1906–1954), whose work sensitively and realistically treats the lives of cosmopolitan Istanbul's lower classes and ethnic minorities, subjects which led to some criticism in the contemporary nationalistic atmosphere. The tradition of the "village novel", on the other hand, arose somewhat later. As its name suggests, the "village novel" deals, in a generally realistic manner, with life in the villages and small towns of Turkey. The major writers in this tradition are Kemal Tahir (1910–1973), Orhan Kemal (1914–1970), and Yaşar Kemal (1923– ). Yaşar Kemal, in particular, has earned fame outside of Turkey not only for his novels; many of which, such as 1955's İnce Memed ("Memed, My Hawk"), elevate local tales to the level of epic; but also for his firmly leftist political stance. In a very different tradition, but evincing a similar strong political viewpoint, was the satirical short-story writer Aziz Nesin (1915–1995) and Rıfat Ilgaz (1911–1993).

Another novelist contemporary to, but outside of, the social realist and "village novel" traditions is Ahmet Hamdi Tanpınar (1901–1962). In addition to being an important essayist and poet, Tanpınar wrote a number of novels; such as Huzur ("Tranquillity", 1949) and Saatleri Ayarlama Enstitüsü ("The Time Regulation Institute", 1961); which dramatize the clash between East and West in modern Turkish culture and society. Similar problems are explored by the novelist and short-story writer Oğuz Atay (1934–1977). Unlike Tanpınar, however, Atay—in such works as his long novel Tutunamayanlar ("The Disconnected", 1971–1972) and his short story "Beyaz Mantolu Adam" ("Man in a White Coat", 1975)—wrote in a more modernist and existentialist vein. On the other hand, Onat Kutlar's İshak ("Isaac", 1959), composed of nine short stories which are written mainly from a child's point of view and are often surrealistic and mystical, represent a very early example of magic realism.

The tradition of literary modernism also informs the work of novelist Adalet Ağaoğlu (1929–2020). Her trilogy of novels collectively entitled Dar Zamanlar ("Tight Times", 1973–1987), for instance, examines the changes that occurred in Turkish society between the 1930s and the 1980s in a formally and technically innovative style. Orhan Pamuk (1952– ), winner of the 2006 Nobel Prize in Literature, is another such innovative novelist, though his works—such as 1990's Beyaz Kale ("The White Castle") and Kara Kitap ("The Black Book") and 1998's Benim Adım Kırmızı ("My Name is Red")—are influenced more by postmodernism than by modernism. This is true also of Latife Tekin (1957– ), whose first novel Sevgili Arsız Ölüm ("Dear Shameless Death", 1983) shows the influence not only of postmodernism, but also of magic realism. Elif Şafak is the most read woman Turkish novelist.

== National Literature (1911-1923) ==
- Ömer Seyfettin, short story writer (1884–1920)
- Halide Edib Adıvar, novelist (1884–1964)
- Reşat Nuri Güntekin, novelist (1889–1956)
- Yakup Kadri Karaosmanoğlu, novelist, poet, short story writer (1889–1974)
- Mehmet Fuat Köprülü, sociologist, writer (1890–1966)

== Republican Period Literature (1923- ) ==
=== Novel ===
- Cevat Şakir Kabaağaçlı, novelist (1890–1973)
- Peyami Safa, novelist, journalist (1899–1961)
- Ahmet Hamdi Tanpınar, novelist, essayist (1901–1962)
- Sabahattin Ali, novelist, poet, essayist (1907–1948)
- Kemal Tahir, novelist (1910–1973)
- Orhan Kemal, novelist (1914–1970)
- Peride Celal, novelist, short story writer (1916–2013)
- Orhan Hançerlioğlu novelist (1916–1991)
- Samim Kocagöz, novelist (1916–1993)
- Semiha Ayverdi, novelist (1916–1993)
- Tarık Buğra, novelist (1918–1994)
- Yusuf Atılgan, novelist (1921–1989)
- Yaşar Kemal, novelist, short story writer (1923–2015)
- Fakir Baykurt, novelist (1929–1999)
- Bilge Karasu, novelist (1930–1995)
- Leyla Erbil, novelist, short story writer (1931–2013)
- Oğuz Atay, novelist (1934–1977)
- Sevgi Soysal, novelist (1936–1976)
- Ahmet Altan, novelist (1950–)
- Orhan Pamuk, novelist, Nobel laureate (1952–)
- Murathan Mungan, novelist, poet, playwright (1955–)
- Hasan Ali Toptaş, novelist (1958–)
- Perihan Mağden, novelist and columnist (1960–)
- Elif Şafak, novelist (1971–)

=== Short story ===
- Memduh Şevket Esendal, short story writer (1883–1952)
- Kenan Hulusi Koray, short story writer (1906–1943)
- Sait Faik Abasıyanık, short story writer (1906–1954)
- Haldun Taner, short story writer and dramatist (1915–1986)
- Aziz Nesin, short story writer and humorist (1915–1995)
- Vüs`at O. Bener, short story writer and novelist (1922-2005)
- Onat Kutlar, short story writer and poet (1936-1995)
- Tomris Uyar, short story writer, novelist (1941–2003)

=== Journalism ===
- Falih Rıfkı Atay, journalist (1894–1971)
- Peyami Safa, journalist and novelist (1899–1961)

=== Essay ===
- Suut Kemal Yetkin, essayist (1903–1980)
- Kemal Bilbaşar, essayist (1910–1983)
- Cemil Meriç, essayist (1916–1987)
- Ruşen Eşref Ünaydın, essayist (1892–1959)
- Nurullah Ataç, essayist (1898–1957)

== Drama ==
- Behçet Necatigil, dramatist (1916–1979)
- Necati Cumalı, dramatist (1921- )
- Ahmet Kutsi Tecer, dramatist (1901–1967)
- Şevket Süreyya Aydemir, biographer (1897–1974)
