= Istanbul Technical University Faculty of Civil Engineering =

ITU Faculty of Civil Engineering
- Type: Public school
- Established: 1727; 299 years ago as Humbarahane
- Dean: Prof. Dr. Vedat Uyak
- Location: Istanbul, Turkey
- Campus: Urban
- Website: www.ins.itu.edu.tr

ITU Faculty of Civil Engineering is the first faculty of Istanbul Technical University. Its foundation date is considered as the starting of the engineering education in Ottoman Empire. Faculty has three divisions.

- Civil engineering
- Geomatic engineering
- Environmental engineering

== Notable alumni ==
- Mustafa İnan
- Süleyman Demirel
- Oğuz Atay
- Nahit Kumbasar
- Semih Salih Tezcan
- Recai Kutan
