= Jale İnan =

Turkish classical archaeologist (1914-2001)

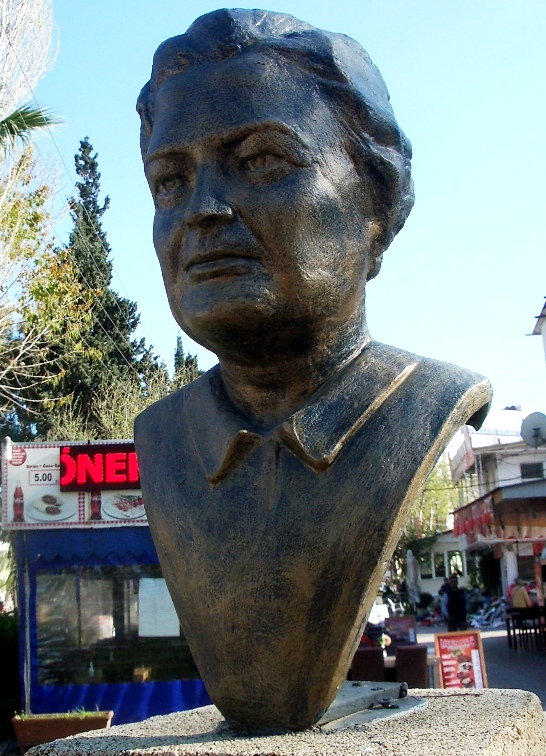
- Bust of Jale İnan at a public park in Kuşadası, Turkey
- Born: Jale Oğan; 1 February 1914; Istanbul, Ottoman Empire
- Died: 26 February 2001 (aged 87); Istanbul, Turkey
- Occupations: Archaeologist, educator
- Years active: 1943–2000
- Known for: First Turkish woman archaeologist, known for reuniting pieces of Weary Hercules.
- Spouse: Mustafa İnan

Jale İnan (1 February 1914 – 26 February 2001) was a Turkish archaeologist, and she is considered to be the first Turkish woman to have been active in the discipline. She led excavations in Perga and Side which resulted in the expansion of the Antalya Museum. Her restoration work on the Temple of Apollo in Side was noted for its significance to Turkish heritage. Her scientific work on the "Weary Hercules" statue in the collections of the Museum of Fine Arts, Boston formed the legal basis for return of the bust of the statue to the Antalya Museum to be reunited with the statue's base. The Antalya Women's Museum has an annual award in her honour which recognizes the woman of the year.

== Early life ==
Jale Ogan was born on 1 February 1914 in Istanbul to Mesture Hanım and Aziz Ogan as their second daughter Her father was the curator and director of the İzmir Archeology Museum for many years and later became the director of the Istanbul Archaeological Museum. During the beginning decades of the Turkish Republic, he brought transformation to curatorial work in the country by systematically cataloguing the holdings and utilizing laboratories to scientifically restore objects and artifacts. He also opened galleries to the public expanding museum collections and encouraged his daughter in her desire to study archaeology. After graduating from the Erenköy Girls High School in 1934, her father helped her secure a scholarship to study abroad, since there was no opportunity for her to continue studies in Turkey.

Studying in Germany, with the Alexander von Humboldt Foundation scholarship, Ogan began her archaeological training in Berlin, at the German Archaeological Institute. The following year, she was awarded a scholarship to continue studying by the Turkish government. Despite the war, Ogan was determined to complete her doctorate and though bombs regularly fell on the city, she took her thesis and notes into a bunker continuing to work. Ogan graduated in 1943 after completing her doctoral thesis, Kunstgeschichtliche Untersuchung der Opferhandlung auf römischen Münzen (Examination of Art History in Sacrifice Rituals on Roman Coins), alongside Gerhart Rodenwaldt.

== Career ==
Ogan returned to Turkey in 1943 and became an assistant to Clemens Bosch, Chair of Ancient History and Numismatics for the University of Istanbul. In 1944, she married Mustafa İnan, a civil engineer and instructor at the Istanbul Technical University, and the following year gave birth to their son, Hüseyin İnan. She spent the next two years taking photographs of artifacts and organizing the archive at the university. In 1946, she worked with Arif Müfid Mansel to found a chair of classical archaeology at Istanbul University, as previously the university had no independent archaeological department. That same year, she began excavations with Mansel on the site at Perga working on the Temple of Artemis. The following year, they began digs at Side, initially working on the site of the Temple of Apollo, continuing their excavations until 1966. During this period, in 1962, the conversion of one of the baths on the site into a museum was completed under İnan's direction and the Antalya Museum had to be expanded twice to house the findings.

İnan began publishing articles in both German and Turkish on her studies of sculptures. The first was an evaluation of Roman portraits from the Anatolia region, Antalya bölgesi Roma devri portreleri: Römische Porträts aus dem Gebiet von Antalya (Roman portraits from the area of Antalya, 1965) and the following year she published Roman and Early Byzantine Portrait Sculpture in Asia Minor with Elisabeth Alföldi-Rosenbaum. In 1967, İnan was put in charge of the excavations at Perga and that same year, a large group of bronze statues appeared in the United States with a murky provenance, but with claims of possible origin in south-west Anatolia. İnan began working to try to verify the actual location of origin in 1973. Unlike other finds in which the sites were known and misappropriated pieces later appeared in museums, the bronzes were unique in that the pieces appeared in a museum but their place of origin was unknown.

From 1970 to 1972, İnan worked at a dig site in the ancient city of Cremna in the Pisidia region and then between 1972 and 1979 excavated at Seleucia along the Mediterranean coast north of Manavgat, uncovering the city agora, as well as several baths and the temple structure. Dated to the Hellenistic period, the agora was constructed in the Ionic Order and contained decorations depicting the Seven Sages of Greece as well as mosaics. She was appointed as a full professor at Istanbul University in 1974, and upon Mansel's death, the following year was elevated to the head of the archaeology department.

In 1980, while excavating at Perga, İnan uncovered the bottom half of a 2nd-century AD copy of Lysippos' "Weary Heracles". Rumors at the dig had led them to a workman who was suspected of taking statuary, but no one suspected that the upper torso of the statue was stolen. The following year, the missing half surfaced in New York. The bottom half of the statue was displayed at the Antalya Museum and the upper half was displayed at MFA, after their 1982 acquisition of the piece. From 1981 to 1990, İnan led restoration work on the Temple of Apollo at Side, conserving a significant monument of Turkey's cultural heritage. Though she retired from the university in 1983, İnan continued to work, beginning excavations again in Perga at the Theater in 1985 continuing her work there until 1992.

In 1990, İnan uncovered the Sebasteion, or imperial cult temple, in a dig at Bubon, which she attributed as the place which had housed the bronze statues she had first heard of in 1967. Her findings were published in the book, Boubon Sebasteionu ve heykelleri üzerine son araştırmalar in 1994. The bronzes were said to have been brought to the Burdur Archaeological Museum with an unknown origin, but due to the unauthorized excavations reported at Bubon at that time and the similarities to artifacts found there, İnan began her investigation at that location. From the looter's diary and examination of scattered pieces of arms, heads and torsos held in various collections worldwide, she confirmed that the building had inscriptions for fourteen statues. Though her attribution of seven statues to the Bubon site gained wide acceptance in archaeological circles, the scattered nature of the pieces and the unauthorized excavation of the statues have raised doubts by other researchers.

In 1990, a journalist, Özgen Acar, was attending an exhibition at the New York Metropolitan Museum of Art and went to see the private collection of Shelby White and Leon Levy. He spotted the statue and thought that it looked familiar. After publishing photographs of the statue in the American art magazine Connoisseur, İnan did a photo stitching of the bust portion and agreed with Acar that the two pieces were of the same statue. She was determined to retrieve the statue as part of Turkey's cultural heritage and made a plaster cast of the lower portion to prove that the two parts would fit together. İnan, Engin Özgen, the General Director Monuments and Museums and students went to Boston with the cast to meet with experts and lawyers, but their results were rejected. At her own expense, İnan made a second trip, with a plaster cast made by an American sculptor, which the Turkish government had hired, in 1992. The second cast conclusively proved the two parts were of the same statue, but the MFA continued to fight returning the piece to Turkey until 2011.

Beginning in 1995, İnan who had Parkinson's disease, curtailed her field work and focused her work on publishing. Works produced in this period included Toroslar’da Bir Antik Kent: Lyrbe? Seleukeia? (1998) and Perge'nin Roma devri heykeltraşlığı 1 (2000), which catalogued the finds made in Perga from 1946 to 1992.

== Death and legacy ==
In 1989, in honor of İnan's 75th birthday, a book, Festschrift für Jale Inan, was published by colleagues and friends in honor of her lifelong accomplishments. Prior to her death, on 26 February 2001, İnan donated her books and compilations to the Antalya Museum. In her honor, the Antalya Women's Museum established the Woman of the Year Award, given annually to recognize women who have contributed to Turkish culture and the development of women. İnan was also featured in the Google Doodle of 27 September 2022.

Her collection, donated by her son Hüseyin İnan, was digitized and made freely available by Boğaziçi University Archives and Documentation Center.
