= Hikmet Birand =

Turkish botanist and writer (1904–1972)

- Born: 1904; Karaman, Ottoman Empire
- Died: January 18, 1972 (aged 68); Ankara, Turkey
- Education: Ankara University, Bonn University
- Occupation: Botanist
- Known for: Studies on deforestation of The Central Anatolia in Turkey, founder of chair of botany at Ankara University

Hikmet Birand (1904 – January 18, 1972), was a Turkish botanist, chancellor, lecturer and writer.

== Early life and education ==
Hikmet Birand was born in Karaman in 1904, the son of Ahmet Hilmi Bey and Ayşe Hanım. Origin of his family derives from Adygea and his family was a part of the society that was exiled from Caucasus by Russian Empire. He had a brother and a sister that were respectively İzzet Birand and Kamuran Birand.

He succeeded in primary school, secondary school and high school in Karaman, afterwards enrolled in Halkalı Land based college in Istanbul. After he graduated from the college, went to Germany to study botany at Bonn University. In 1933 he succeeded in Phd thesis with title of "Untersuchungen über Tracheomykosen", and returned to Turkey.

== Career and research ==
Then, he took office as an assistant botanist in Ankara High Agriculture Institute, in which Prof. Dr. Kurt Krause was assigned, from January 1, 1993, to October 28, 1933, and he became chief assistant on October 29, 1933. Later in aforementioned institution he succeeded to become associate professor and professor, respectively in 1938 and 1946. After having founded the college of science at Ankara University, Hikmet Birand was elected as chancellor from 1949 to 1951, and also he served both as a member of Turkish National Education Board and a member of Turkey Commission at UNESCO. In 1960, he made great efforts both in the creation of the METU-Atatürk Forest and in the development of the Herbarium, which was initiated by Kurt Krause in 1933, where plant specimens originating from Turkey are stored and whose international code is ANK.

Birand wrote many books, columns and articles. Five of his books are in German, and published in Germany besides his article series were published in both Ulus and Ülkü. He aimed to raise awareness among Turkish people to protect and recover forests in Turkey with his works.

Birand focused on both vegetation of Central Anatolia and deforestation in Turkey. His opinions implied specifically that archaic forests on hillsides of Central Anatolia had been degraded step by step by human effects that include pasture, logging, and wildfires during Holocene.

In 'Alıç Ağacı ile Sohbetler he mentioned the current condition of forest-steppe border in Central Anatolia, and explained where which plants develop and spread in Turkey.

- 1933 - “Untersuchungen über Tracheomykosen”. Hikmet Ahmet. 1933. Phytopat-hologische Zeitschrift 6, 6(1): 49–101
- 1936 – Büyükada'nın Yeşil Örtüsü
- 1948 – Keltepe Ormanlarında Bir Gün
- 1950 – Bitkilerde Ekonomi Prensipleri. Biriktirme ve Arttırma
- 1952 – Bitki Türleri
- 1952 – Türkiye Bitkileri, Plantae Turcicae, A Preliminary list of species collected in Turkey, A.U. Fen Fakultesi Yayinlari, (In this book 6145 plant specimens which, belong to 671 genera and 2480 species, are examined).
- 1957 – Anadolu Manzaraları (13. Basim, 1999, Tubitak Popüler Bilim Kitaplari ISBN 975-4033212)
- 1962 – Kurak Çorak
- 1964 – Karapınar Olayı ve Erozyon
- 1968 – Alıç Ağacı ile Sohbetler (Yeni basim 2014, Is Bankasi Kultur Yayinlari, ISBN 978-605-332-087-6)
- 1984 – Anadolu Ormanlari (Orgun Yayinlari, Istanbul)

== Death ==
He died in Ankara on 18 January 1972.
