= Sion Treasure =

Treasure trove found in Turkey

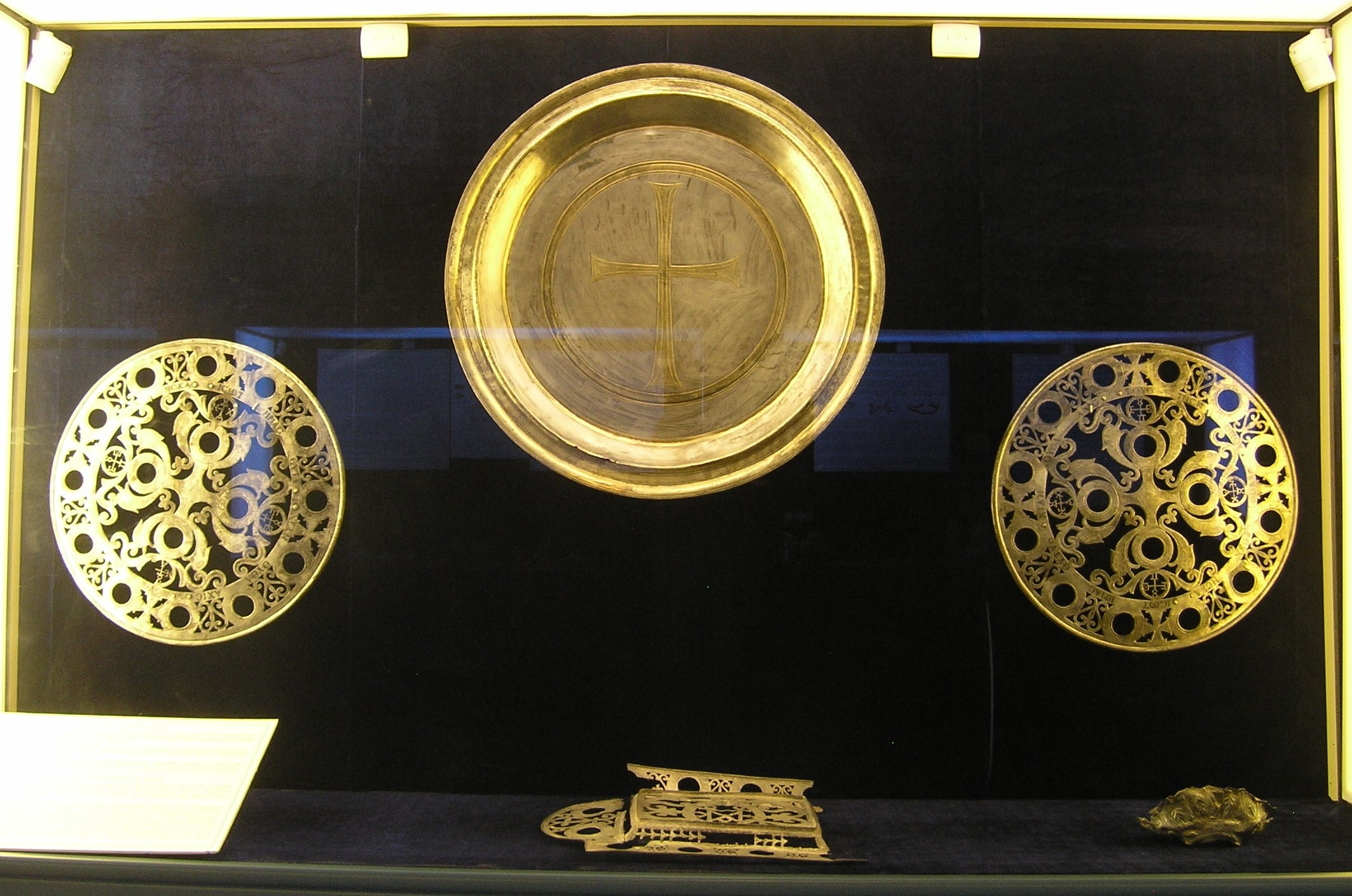
Museum Antalya, Sion treasure 01

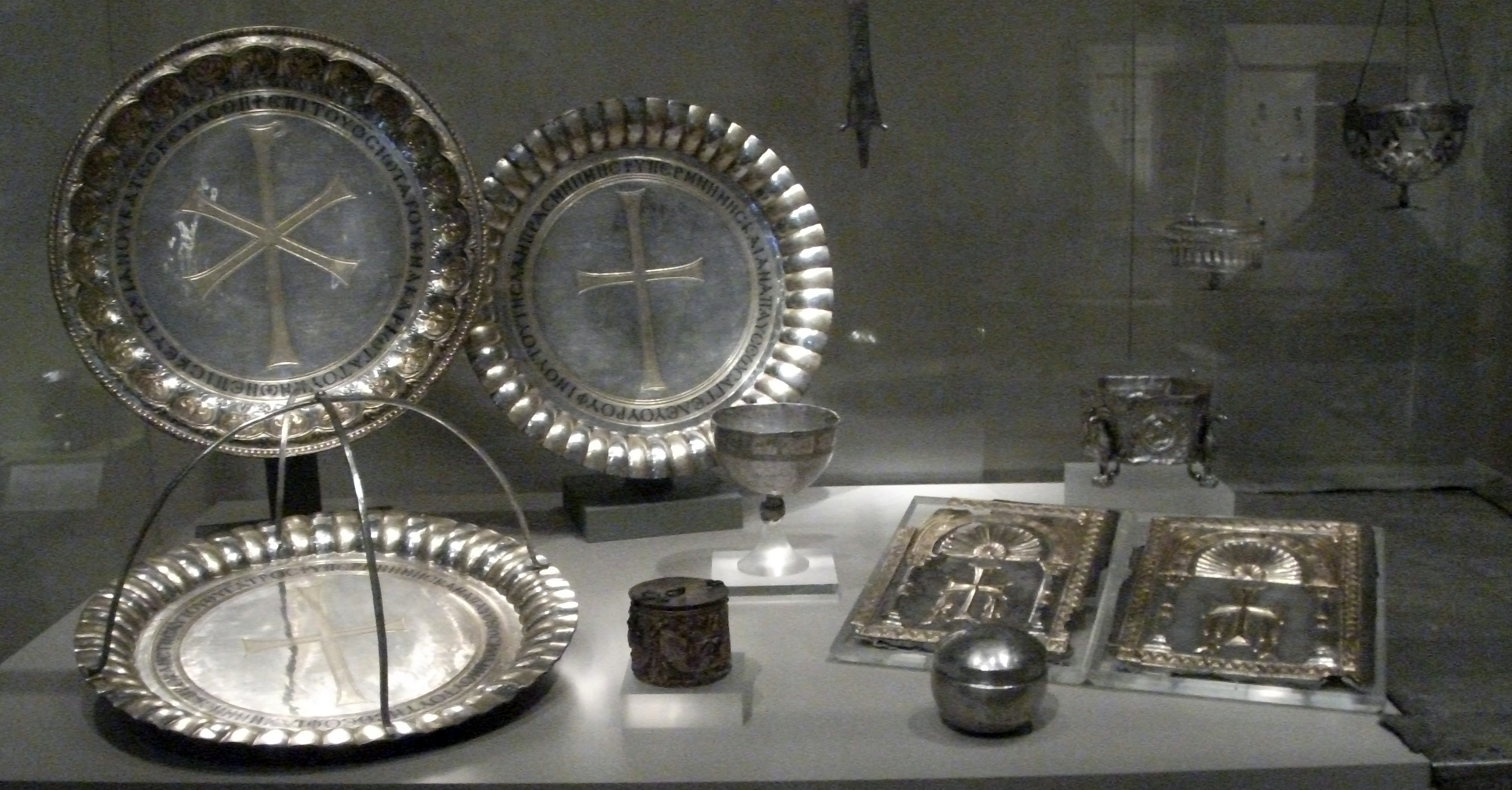
Byzantine collections of Dumbarton OaksDSCF7901 silver

The Sion Treasure (also known as the Kumluca treasure) is a group of liturgical objects and church furnishings found in Kumluca, Turkey in 1963. It consists of 53 to 58 objects. Some of the objects have become part of the Dumbarton Oaks Museum Collection in Washington D.C., as well as the Antalya Museum (Turkey). The treasure was discovered by local residents. Parts were sold to the antiques dealer Georges Zacos. Other parts were donated the Dumbarton Oaks Museum. During this time Turkish archaeologists carried out excavations in the area and found other silver objects that are currently part of the collection of the Antalya Museum. The Sion treasure also contains a total of three pairs of book covers.
