= Ülkü (magazine) =

Turkish magazine (1933–1950)

- Editor-in-chief: Mehmet Fuat Köprülü; Ahmet Kutsi Tecer
- Frequency: Monthly; Biweekly
- First issue: February 1933
- Final issue: August 1950
- Company: Ankara People's House
- Country: Turkey
- Based in: Ankara
- Language: Turkish

Ülkü (Turkish: The Ideal) was a magazine existed between 1933 and 1950. It was one of seventy-five official media outlets of the People's Houses, cultural institutions started in 1932 as an enlightenment project. The title of the magazine was given by Mustafa Kemal Atatürk, founder of the Republic of Turkey.

== History and profile ==
Ülkü was first published in Ankara on 5 February 1933 as one of the organs of the People's Houses. The owner of the magazine was Ankara People's House. The goal was to provide a theoretical basis for the six pillars of Kemalism, namely republicanism, populism, nationalism, laicism, statism, and reformism, and to facilitate their adoption by Turkish people. The magazine included the following major sections among others: literary work, linguistics, history, fine arts, sociology, philosophy economy, agriculture, science, home management, translated works and news from the People's Houses. The target audience of the magazine was intellectuals.

During its lifetime the frequency of Ülkü changed several times. It was published on a monthly basis between its start in February 1933 and August 1941 and between January 1947 and its closure in August 1950. It was published biweekly in the period October 1941–December 1946. The publisher of the magazine also changed, and the following were the publishers of Ülkü: Hâkimiyeti Milliye Publishing House, Ulus Publishing House, Ankara Ulusal Publishing House and Zerbamat Publishing House. The magazine produced a total of 272 issues before it ceased publication in August 1950.

=== Directors and editors ===
Nusret Kemal Köymen and Necip Ali Küçüka were the directors of Ülkü between February 1933 and 1941. In July 1936 Mehmet Fuat Köprülü was appointed editor-in-chief. From 1941 Ahmet Kutsi Tecer began to edit the magazine. In the period January 1947–August 1950 the directors were Tahsin Banguoğlu and Mehmet Tuğrul.

=== Contributors ===
The contributors of Ülkü were part of one of the three major Kemalist factions of the period known as the Ülkü group. They supported the solidarist, radical secularist, and anti-liberal alternatives to the state power.

Many of the Ülkü contributors wrote for the magazine without being paid. Its notable contributors included Recep Peker, Şevket Aziz Kansu, Behçet Kemal Çağlar, Ahmet Adnan Saygun, Pertev N. Boratav, Elif Naci, Ahmet Hamdi Tanpınar, Suut Kemal Yetkin, Yusuf Ziya Ortaç, Orhan Veli Kanık, Hasan Âli Yücel, Bedri Rahmi Eyüboğlu and Sadi Irmak. Niyazi Berkes published articles on sociological studies in the U.S.A between 1938 and 1940 when he was attending the University of Chicago on a research fellowship in sociology.

=== Content ===
Until the editorship of Mehmet Fuat Köprülü in 1936 Ülkü published articles on the Ottoman state which were based on popular accounts. Then its content became much more sophisticated with the editorship of Köprülü. Ahmet Kutsi Tecer's play entitled Koçyiğit Köroğlu was first published in Ülkü in 1941.

=== Significance ===
Although the People Houses published numerous periodicals, only Ülkü lasted for a long period and functioned as the official organ of all of these institutions. The magazine identified and expressed the lines of the state policies. It was distributed not only to cities but also to small villages.
