= Waiting for the Fear =

1975 Turkish short story collection

- Author: Oğuz Atay
- Original title: Korkuyu Beklerken
- Translator: Ralph Hubbel
- Language: Turkish
- Publication date: 1975
- Publication place: Turkey
- English publication date: 2024 (NYRB Classics)
- ISBN: 975470158X

Waiting for the Fear (Turkish: Korkuyu Beklerken) is a short story collection first published by Turkish author Oğuz Atay in 1975. It was his sole work of collected short fiction, published two years before his death. An English translation was released in 2024 by NYRB Classics, translated by Ralph Hubbel, which received generally positive reviews.

It is a collection of eight short stories revolving around fearful people, isolated from their society and from language in general. The longest story in the collection is the eponymous "Waiting for the Fear", about an unnamed man who receives a threatening letter in an unknown language from a mysterious society, who begins isolating himself out of increasing fear and paranoia.

== Plot ==
The first story is "Man in a White Overcoat". It follows a mute and nameless beggar, described as being a failure at everything, including begging. He picks up a woman's overcoat in white at a shop and proceeds to wander the city, doing odd jobs, including being staged as a live mannequin in another clothing store. He eventually makes it to the beach, where he is declared a pervert and harassed, and is told to leave the beach. He eventually walks straight into the water and disappears.

The second story is "The Forgotten", which details a woman discovering the corpse of her old boyfriend in her attic, while she went up to look for books to sell. She notices a gun in the corpse's left hand, and wonders if he killed himself, before reminiscing about their relationship and past. She recalls that he went up to the attic one day after an argument but never returned, but does not remember hearing a gunshot. At the end, her husband calls out to her and she leaves the attic.

The third is the title story, "Waiting for the Fear". An anxious man receives a letter written in an unknown language. He contacts a friend at a university and discovers it is a threat warning him not to leave his house under any circumstances from a secret society. He begins to isolate himself, staying inside, although he is not certain if it is real. He becomes more paranoid and solitary over time, attempting to learn languages (such as Latin), despite his struggles with language in general. He does household chores, makes dishes such as Noah's pudding, starts ordering groceries through a courier service, and eventually enrolls in remote courses at a university. He watches his neighbor's house get demolished after it was bought to be replaced by an apartment complex, and wins a large cash prize from his bank in a contest. He eventually discovers that the sect is a South American group known as Ubor-Metenga. Later, as he is dousing his house in kerosene and preparing to burn it down, he discovers the leaders of the sect were arrested; while reading a piece of newspaper he was about to use as kindling. He abandons his plans, moves into a hotel, starts visiting acquaintances, and resolves to get married. When he returns home his house has been destroyed in a landslide from the incomplete construction of his neighbor's demolished house. Although he is then engaged, he gets enraged seeing ordinary couples when he is out at a restaurant with his fiancée and starts writing threatening letters in the Ubor-Metenga style. Later, regretful but unafraid, he turns himself into the police for writing these letters, transcribing one identical to the one he received.

The next two stories are written as letters. One is "A Letter", subtitled "Unsent", a stream-of-consciousness letter written by a man to a coworker whom he holds in high esteem. The author frequently struggles with language and dictates the issues he has writing the letter. He details his relationship issues, his dog's habits, and a mysterious man he refers to as "The Third Thing". The author is clearly nervous about the process of the letter (but notes a refusal to edit it), but does not have the courage to send it. The next, "Not Yes Not No", is portrayed as a letter written in to a newspaper advice column. The columnist chooses to publish the letter mostly unedited, but "could not resist" adding commentary in parentheticals. The letter details its author's love for a local girl, primarily through hand-delivered love letters, and her lack of response, which he describes as "NOT YES NOT NO", capitalized by the columnist. The author is evidently obsessed with the girl, who does not explicitly accept or reject him. By the end it is revealed that the author is in prison, claiming to have been blackmailed and threatened into robbing a friend's house.

The sixth story, "The Wooden Horse", follows Tuğrul Tuzcuoğlu of the Tuzcu family, the only son of a deceased member of parliament, Bekir Bey. Their village is said to be the site of Troy from ancient Greek myth. Tuğrul attempts to stop a replica of the Trojan Horse from being built as a tourist trap. A fundraising effort is made among the locals for its construction, and Tuğrul initially attempts to petition the local council with a letter to stop its construction. He later works with the planning committee, and when he learns that the horse is set to be made out of concrete, not wood, he suggests that it at least be made hollow, to preserve that aspect of history of the Trojan Horse. A later second petition is also unsuccessful, and a police escort is placed on the scene of the Trojan Horse on the day of its official opening, while Tuğrul is missing from the ceremony. As a commencement speech begins, the Trojan Horse opens and Tuğrul emerges in classical armor with a gun, aimed at the leads of the project.

The narrator of "Letter to my Father", the seventh story, is a published author writing to his two-years-deceased father. He discusses their relationship and the problems it has caused for him, and the differences in their points of view. At the end he wonders if he will end up being like him, including in death.

The final story, "Railway Storytellers", subtitled "A Dream", follows three people who sell stories to passing tourists at a remote train station. Narrated by a nameless man, they compete with vendors of other goods primarily for their sales. As their conditions and homelessness by the train station worsen, the narrator realizes he is falling in love with the female storyteller of the group. Although he initially sees success in love, his mental facilities decline, seemingly due to hunger as business declines. Eventually his lover disappears on one of the trains, the third storyteller in the group had long since died, and the train station no longer sees business due to other routes having opened. It ends with a question to the reader: "Where are you?"

== Publication history ==
Waiting for the Fear was first published in Turkey in 1975, four years after the publication of Atay's first novel and two years before his death at age 43. It was his only published work of short fiction.

Atay had also submitted "Railway Storytellers" for publication in a Turkish literary journal, Türk Dili, that was managed by the Turkish Language Association. The journal's editors objected to Atay's unconventional use of language and edited the story before publishing it, "purifying" it through the removal of words of non-Turkish origin. The stories the group sold should have been described as taze ("fresh"), but were instead called yeni ("new"), because the former originated from Arabic. The issue containing it did not run until after his death.

An English translation was released in 2024 under the NYRB Classics label by Ralph Hubbel. It featured an introduction from Merve Emre.

== Reception ==
The 2024 English translation received positive reviews. The New Yorker's Merve Emre and the Los Angeles Review of Books' Eamon McGrath both noted the high quality English rendering of complex Turkish prose. Publishers Weekly praised it as an example of modernist literature. The New York Times' Ayten Tartici referred to it as "astonishing [and] deeply wry". The Modern Language Association awarded Hubbel's translation with an honorable mention for their novel in translation prize in 2024.

The Guardian included Waiting for the Fear on a list of the top 10 novels about Turkey in 2022.

== Style and themes ==
Authors such as Franz Kafka, Vladimir Nabokov, and James Joyce have been credited as major influences on Atay's work in general, which reflects in Waiting for the Fear, described as a work of modernism, postmodernism, and absurdism. Many of the stories are first person narratives, often letters or stream of consciousness writing.

Being disconnected from one's self and society is a common theme throughout. The protagonist of the eponymous short story grows increasingly isolated through paranoia, to the point where he appears to start annotating his own thoughts with asides. Many of the characters throughout struggle with the prevalence of foreign languages in Turkey due to westernization efforts in the 1970s, and appear to be hostile towards foreigners, although they also engage in self-criticism as well, revealing what Tartici referred to as "disjointed interior states". The narrator of the self-titled story is simultaneously critical of foreigners while feeling ashamed that he cannot speak their languages.

Parts of the novel also reflect Atay's criticisms of Turkish language reforms, which is reflected in how Waiting's narrator is unable to properly voice his thoughts with his own words. He attempts to learn Latin out of a desire for new words. The Believer referred to many of the protagonists as being "alien[ated] from language". The mute narrator in "Man in a White Overcoat" is unable to express himself at all, and is used without a way to protest. The language of all of Atay's works reflect both pre- and post-reform modes of Turkish vocabulary. Atay himself aimed to find a path for Turkish literature that was not copying the trends of Western works or staying bound to the traditions of Ottoman works.

In Atay's later work, Diary, he wrote of the "fear of living", present in Turkish society and family life, manifesting as anxiety about the outside world, which is reflected among many of the stories in the collection. The Los Angeles Review of Books compared the isolation and "time-warping" surrealism of the eponymous short story to the COVID-19 lockdowns, including the narrator's obsessive bursts of working on projects.
