= Oğuz Atay =

Turkish novelist (1934–1977)

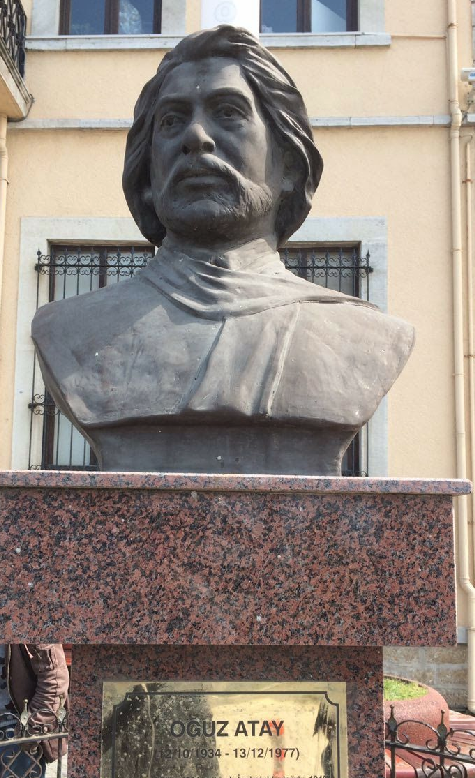
- Born: 12 October 1934; İnebolu, Turkey
- Died: 13 December 1977 (aged 43); Istanbul, Turkey
- Resting place: Edirnekapı Martyr's Cemetery, Istanbul
- Education: Istanbul Technical University
- Occupations: Novelist, engineer
- Writing career
- Period: 1970–1977
- Genre: Fiction
- Notable works: Tutunamayanlar, Tehlikeli Oyunlar
- Literary movement: Modernism, Postmodernism
- Website: oguzatay.net

Oğuz Atay (12 October 1934 – 13 December 1977) was a Turkish novelist and engineer. His first novel, Tutunamayanlar ('The Disconnected'), appeared in 1971–72. Never reprinted in his lifetime and controversial among critics, it has become a best-seller since a new edition came out in 1984. It has been described as "probably the most eminent novel of twentieth-century Turkish literature".

== Life ==
Oğuz Atay was born on 12 October 1934, in the Turkish town of İnebolu, in the province of Kastamonu. His father, Cemil Atay, was a judge and also a Member of Parliament from the Republican People's Party. He went to elementary and middle school in Ankara, completed his high school education at Ankara Maarif Koleji, and his undergraduate degree at ITU School of Civil Engineering. He joined Istanbul State Engineering and Architecture School (now, Yildiz Technical University) as a faculty member, and became an associate professor in 1975.

His most notable novel Tutunamayanlar was published in 1971–72, and his second novel Tehlikeli Oyunlar was published in 1973. He wrote several plays, short-stories, and a biography. He died of a brain tumor on 13 December 1977, before he could complete his final project, Türkiye'nin Ruhu.

== Works ==
The literary works are now all published by Iletişim.

- Topoğrafya ('Topography') (1970, a textbook for students of surveying)
- Tutunamayanlar (1971–72) – (novel, 'The Disconnected')
- Tehlikeli Oyunlar (1973) – (novel, 'Dangerous Games')
- Bir Bilim Adamının Romanı: Mustafa İnan (1975) – (biographical novel, 'The Life of a Scientist': Mustafa İnan)
- Korkuyu Beklerken (1975) – (short stories, 'Waiting for the Fear') English translation by Ralph Hubbell (New York Review Books, 2024).
- Oyunlarla Yaşayanlar (play, 'Those Who Live by Games')
- Günlük (diary, published with a facsimile of the manuscript)
- Eylembilim (unfinished fiction, 'Science of Action')

What he had hoped would be his magnum opus, Türkiye'nin Ruhu ('The Spirit of Turkey'), was cut short by his death. It is not known what form he intended for it.

== Influences and achievements ==
The secondary literature on Atay, mostly in Turkish but also in German and English, is very extensive.

Atay was of a generation deeply committed to the westernising, scientific, secular culture encouraged by the revolution of the 1920s; he had no nostalgia for the corruption of the late Ottoman Empire, though he knew its literature, and was in particular well versed in Divan poetry. Yet the Western culture he saw around him was largely a form of colonialism, tending to crush what he saw was best about Turkish life. He had no patience with the traditionalists, who countered Western culture with improbable stories of early Turkish history. He soon lost patience with the underground socialists of the 1960s. And, although some writers, such as Ahmet Hamdi Tanpınar, had written fiction dealing with the modernisation of Turkey, there were none that came near to dealing with life as he saw it lived. In fact, almost the only Turkish writer of the Republican period whose name appears in his work is the poet Nâzim Hikmet.

The solution lay in using the West for his own ends. His subject matter is frequently the detritus of Western culture — translations of tenth-rate historical novels, Hollywood fantasy films, trivialities of encyclopaedias, Turkish tangos. To the fracturing of Turkish life there corresponds the fracturing of language: the flowery Ottoman, the artificial purified Turkish, the rank colloquialism. From the West Atay took one of his favourite motifs, but so changed as to be new, intercourse between people as playing games: the free games of love and friendship, the ritualised games of superficial acquaintance, the mechanical games of bureaucracy.

Since the publication of Tutunamayanlar many Turkish novelists have broken away from traditional styles, first the slightly older writer Adalet Ağaoğlu, then others including Orhan Pamuk and Latife Tekin.

== Tribute ==
On 12 October 2020, Google celebrated his 86th birthday with a Google Doodle.
