= Tutunamayanlar =

1972 novel by Oğuz Atay

- İletişim Yayınları, 39th Edition
- Author: Oğuz Atay
- Language: Turkish
- Genre: Stream of Consciousness
- Publisher: İletişim Yayınları (İstanbul)
- Publication date: 1972
- Publication place: Turkey
- Media type: Print (Paperback)
- Pages: 724
- ISBN: 975-470-011-7
- OCLC: 54857185

Tutunamayanlar (English: The Disconnected) is the first novel of Oğuz Atay, one of the most prominent Turkish authors of the twentieth century. It was written in 1970–71 and published in 1972. Although it was never reprinted in his lifetime and was controversial among critics, it has become a best-seller since a new edition came out in 1984.

Tutunamayanlar has been described as “probably the most eminent novel of twentieth-century Turkish literature”. This reference is due to a UNESCO survey, which goes on: “it poses an earnest challenge to even the most skilled translator with its kaleidoscope of colloquialisms and sheer size.” It has been translated into Dutch, as Het leven in stukken ("Life in pieces"), and into German, as Die Haltlosen (usually "unstable", "unsupported", but here a literal translation of the Turkish). An English translation by Sevin Seydi, as The Disconnected, was published by Olric Press in 2017 (ISBN 978-0-9955543-0-6).
