= Mustafa İnan =

Turkish civil engineering academic

- Born: 1911; Adana, Ottoman Empire
- Died: 1967 (aged 55–56); Freiburg, West Germany
- Resting place: Zincirlikuyu Cemetery
- Citizenship: Turkish
- Education: Istanbul Technical University; ETH Zurich
- Spouse: Jale İnan
- Children: Hüseyin İnan
- Awards: Grand Ufficale, TÜBİTAK
- Scientific career
- Fields: Civil engineering
- Workplaces: Istanbul Technical University; Scientific and Technological Research Council of Turkey

Mustafa İnan (1911–1967) was a Turkish civil engineering academic.

== Life ==
He was born in Adana. His mother was Rabia and father was Hüseyin Avni. At the end of the First World War, Adana was occupied by the French forces and his family had to move to Konya. At the end of the Turkish War of Independence the family returned to Adana and Mustafa continued his secondary education in Adana. In 1931 he took the first place in the entrance examinations of the Istanbul Technical University (then known as Engineering School). Later he was sent to Switzerland for advanced studies in the ETH Zurich (German: Eidgenössische Technische). After his doctorate thesis 1941, he returned to Turkey to continue academic studies in the Engineering School. In 1944, the school was renamed Istanbul Technical University and he became the associate professor of Mechanics and Strength.

After compulsory military service in 1944, he married Jale İnan, the first female archaeologist in Turkey. In 1945, he became the professor, in 1954–1957 term he became the dean of the Civil engineering faculty and in 1957–1959 term the rector of the university. In 1963, he was elected as a member of the science committee of the Scientific and Technological Research Council of Turkey (known as TÜBİTAK) Later he became the chairman of the committee. On 5 August 1967 he died in Freiburg, Germany. Five days later, following a ceremony in the university, he was buried in the Zincirlikuyu Cemetery in Istanbul.

== Academic life ==
In 1943, he published his paper about Vrendel beams and this paper is considered as the very first Turkish engineering paper published in a foreign country. While in the university he established the first photoelasticity laboratory in Turkey in the early 1950s. In 1959–1964 term he published 11 papers. His paper of 1961 was about the carryover matrix was internationally one of the earliest papers on the subject. In 1962 he introduced the concept of computers to the university. He wrote four academic books and translated four others.

His field of study was wider than the civil engineering. One of his earliest papers was on the satellite trajectories. He also wrote an essay on the language and mathematic relations.

== Awards and legacy ==
In 1957, during his deanship he was awarded the title Grand Ufficiale by the Italian government. After his death TÜBİTAK awarded him in 1971. TÜBİTAK also asked Oğuz Atay, a well-known author and a student of İnan, to write a book about İnan. The book titled Bir Blim Adamının Romanı (English: The Novel of a Scientist) was published in 1975. A viaduct on the Ankara–Istanbul motorway is named after him as well as Istanbul Technical University's central library.

His collection, donated by his son Hüseyin İnan, was digitized and made freely accessible by Istanbul Technical University Mustafa İnan Library.

== Books and translations ==
=== Books ===
- 1948: Elasto-Mekanikte Başlangıç Değerleri Metodu ve Taşıma Matrisi (English: The Method of Initial Values and the Carryover Matrix in Elastomechanics)
- 1966: Elastik Çubukların Genel Teorisi (English: General Theory of Elastic Bars)
- 1967: Cisimlerin Mukavemeti (English: Strength of Materials)
- 1969: Düzlemde Elastisite Teorisi (English: Plane Theory of Elasticity) – (Posthumously published.)

=== Translations to Turkish ===
- 1948: Stephen Timoshenko: Strength of Materials (Vol I & II)
- 1950: Stephen Timoshenko: Elastic Planes and Shells
- 1950: Theodor Pöschl: Elementary Strength
