= Ahmet Kutsi Tecer =

Turkish politician

- Born: 4 September 1901; Jerusalem, Ottoman Empire
- Died: 23 July 1967 (aged 65); Istanbul, Turkey
- Occupations: Poet, politician

Ahmet Kutsi Tecer (4 September 1901 – 23 July 1967) was a Turkish poet and politician.

== Biography ==
Born in Jerusalem, Tecer studied philosophy and started his career as a philosophy teacher. Then, he worked in the Ministry of National Education and was a member of parliament from 1942 to 1946. Tecer was appointed editor-in-chief of Ülkü, a cultural magazine of the Ankara People House, in 1941 and held the post until 1947. He published a play entitled Koçyiğit Köroğlu which was first published in Ülkü.

In 1950, he became an administrative councillor for the UNESCO, but then returned to his profession as teacher, which he practiced until his retirement in 1966. He started writing poems as early as the 1920s, which were published in various newspapers and then collected in an anthology called "Şiirler" in 1932. The poems are in traditional meter and - like the plays he started writing in the 1940s - deal with patriotism, are rather folksy, and criticize reformism and close ties with the West.
