= Suut Kemal Yetkin =

Turkish writer (1903–1980)

- Born: September 13, 1903; Urfa
- Died: April 18, 1980 (aged 76); Ankara, Turkey
- Education: University of Paris
- Occupations: Academic, writer

Suut Kemal Yetkin (13 September 1903, Urfa – 18 April 1980), was a Turkish academician, writer, essayist, university administrator.

== Biography ==
He was the congressman of Urfa in the Grand National Assembly of Turkey (1st Term). His father was Şeyh Saffet Efendi, and he was the father-in-law of İlhan Öztrak, who served as the Secretary-General of the Presidency during the periods of Ministry of State, Fahri Korutürk and İhsan Sabri Çağlayangil.

=== Education ===
He completed his primary education in Istanbul and his secondary and high school education at Galatasaray High School. He graduated from high school in 1925 and was sent to France after winning the state scholarship competition to study abroad that year. He studied philosophy at University of Paris in France. After returning to Turkey, he worked as a teacher in various high schools and teacher schools. In 1934, he was appointed to the newly established School of Language and History – Geography as an associate professor of Aesthetics and Art History. In 1939, he worked as the General Director of Fine Arts at the Ministry of National Education.

=== Career ===
He entered political life in 1939. Parliament VII. Term and Parliament VIII., he served as an Urfa Deputy of the Republican People's Party. He was not elected in the 1950s elections. He returned to academic life as a professor of Islamic Arts in Faculty of Theology at Ankara University.

He was the Rector of Ankara University between 1959 and 1963. He was the dean of Ankara University Faculty of Theology twice.

== Bibliography ==
- Şiir Üzerine Düşünceler
- Günlerin Götürdüğü
- Yokuşa Doğru
- Düşün Payı
- Edebiyat Üzerine
- Yarına İnanmak
- Yazılanı Yaşama
- Canım Kitap
- Büyük Tedirginler (Mustaripler)
- Estetik (1931)
- Metafizik (1932)
- Sanat Felsefesi (1934)
- Filozof ve Sanat (1935)
- Ahmet Haşim ve Sembolizm (1938)
- Edebî Meslekler (1941)
- Estetik Dersleri Cilt:1 Estetik Tarihi (1942)
- Sanat Meseleleri (1945)
- Sanat Tarihi (1945)
- Leonardo da Vinci'nin Sanatı (1945)
- İslâm Mimarisi (1954)
- Büyük Ressamlar (1955)
- Baduleaire ve Kötülük Çiçekleri (1967)
- Türk Mimarisi (1970)
- Estetik Doktrinler (1972)
- İslâm Ülkelerinde Sanat (1974)
- Barok Sanat (1976)
- Estetik ve Ana Sorunlar (1979).
