= Antalya Museum =

Archaeology museum in Muratpaşa, Turkey

- Antalya Müzesi
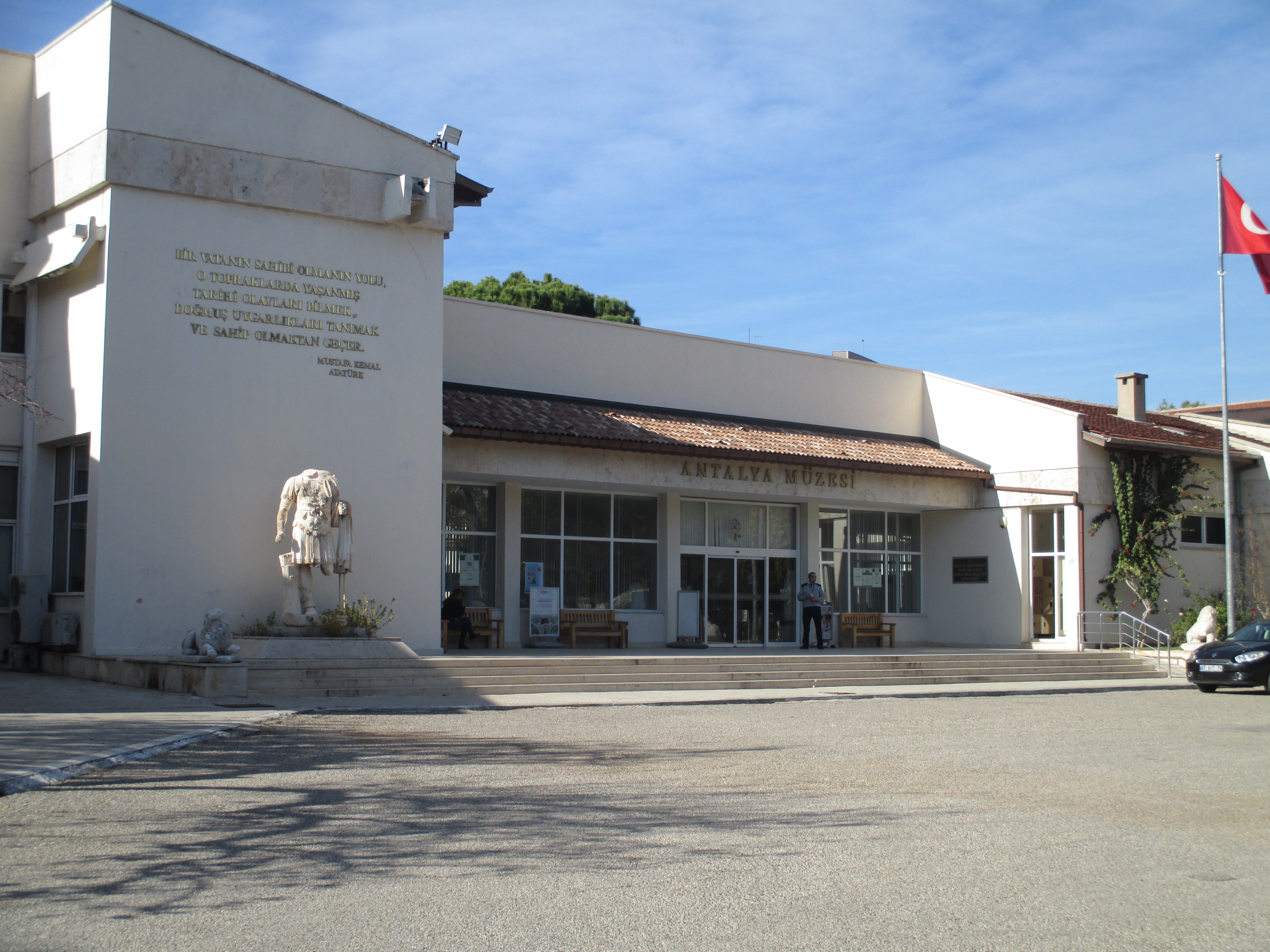
- Antalya Museum of Archaeology
- Established: 1922
- Dissolved: September 2025
- Location: Muratpaşa, Antalya, Turkey
- Coordinates: 36.8856°N 30.6797°E
- Type: Archaeological
- Collection size: 25,000–30,000
- Visitors: 27,750 (2010)
- Website: muze.gov.tr/muze-detay?SectionId=ANT01&DistId=ANT

The Antalya Museum or Antalya Archaeological Museum (Turkish: Antalya Müzesi) was one of Turkey's largest museums, located in Muratpaşa, Antalya. It includes 13 exhibition halls and an open-air gallery. It covers an area of 7,000 m^{2} (75,000 ft^{2}) and 5000 works of art are exhibited. In addition, a further 25,000–30,000 artefacts which cannot be displayed are in storage. As a museum exhibiting examples of works, which illuminate the history of the Mediterranean and Pamphylia regions in Anatolia, Antalya Museum is one of the most important museums in Turkey. The museum won the "European Council Special Prize" in 1988.

Starting in July 2025, the museum was closed for demolition, with all its holdings moved to temporary storage on-site.

== History of the museum ==
At the end of the World War I, during the time when Antalya was under Italian military occupation, Italian archaeologists started removing archaeological treasures that had been found in the city centre and surrounding the Italian Embassy, which they claimed to do in the name of civilization. To prevent these initiatives, Süleyman Fikri Bey, the Sultan's advisor, applied to the Antalya post of provincial governor in 1919, had himself appointed as voluntary curator of antiquities, and first established Antalya Museum to try and collect what remained in the centre.

At first, in 1922, the museum operated in the Alâeddin Mosque, then from 1937 to 1972 it operated in Yivli Minare Mosque where it was later on moved to its present building. It was closed to visitors in order to make a wide range of modifications and restorations in 1982. It was reorganized, following modern museum concepts, and was reopened to the public in April 1985, after the restorations and display arrangements made by the General Directorate of Ancient Objects and Museums.

== 2026 Rebuilding ==
Antalya Museum is currently closed for rebuilding. A 2020 seismic analysis indicated that the museum's structure was at high risk of earthquake damage. The new museum is planned to span around 20,000 square meters of enclosed space at a cost of around $65 million. Officials say that the project will triple storage capacity and bring their conservation technology up-to-date. The Antalya Museum is not the only one facing these changes; heritage sites and museums throughout Turkey are facing similar closures during major renovations.

Academics, professional groups, and the public have expressed outrage over the sudden demolition. They point to the museum's value as a cultural landmark. It was the first Turkish museum design to result from an architectural competition, which was held in 1964. Critics are also concerned about the speed with which this process has unfolded and the lack of opportunities for the public to participate. The seismic performance analysis, which officials cited as necessitating the change, has not yet been made public. Many have demanded to see the results, suggesting the current structure should be reinforced rather than demolished.

Despite the protests, demolition processes began in September 2025. As of May 2026, the site is currently under rebuilding.

== Halls ==
Antalya Museum consists of 13 exhibition rooms, 1 open-air exhibition area, laboratories, a storeroom, repair shops, a photographic room, a conference hall, administrative offices, a cafeteria and living quarters for museum officials. The exhibition rooms are as follows:

=== Natural History Hall ===
The hall shows living creatures from man down to one celled animals, charts and pictures, fossils and bones.

=== Pre-History Hall ===
Here, the artefacts found in Karain, Öküzini and Sehahöyük are exhibited. Karain is the name of a cave in Antalya, which has been the place for series of civilizations. The works range from those of the Palaeolithic to those of the Roman Age. Works include animal fossils, kitchen utensils and likewise.

=== Proto-History Hall ===
The artefacts from the Neolithic, Chalcolithic, and Early Bronze Age found in Hacılar are exhibited here. Artefacts found from the excavations at Semahöyük and its surroundings make up most of the artefacts shown in this hall.

=== Classic Period Hall ===
Here, there are works dating from the Mycenaean Age to the Hellenistic Age, including earthenware figurines, wine bowls, and dishes. In one of the Hellenistic showcases is an important statuette of Apollo. Apart from these, there are statuary works from the Roman period, which make up the largest section of the museum. The list of containers includes Lekythos, Alabastron, Oinokhoe, Kothon, Aryballos and Lagynos.

=== Statuary Hall ===
In this room, the statues of mythological figures dating from the 2nd and 3rd centuries AD, Roman period are exhibited. They were found in the excavations at Perge. The list of statues includes the following mythological figures: Minerva, Zeus, Artemis, Harpocrates, Aphrodite, Asclepius, Tyche, Meleager, Hecate, Hermes and Marsyas.

=== Hall of Imperial Statues ===
Here are exhibited statues portraying emperors, empresses and other personages from the Roman period. They were found in excavations at Perge. In the centre of the room is a large statue of Plancia Magna, a great administrator who contributed much towards the development of Perge during that city's golden period. There are also statues of the Emperor Hadrian, the Emperor Septimius Severus and his wife Julia Domna, the co-emperor of Rome Lucius Verus, the emperor Trajan, the emperor Caracalla and the king Alexander the Great.

=== Sarcophagus Hall ===
Sarcophagi from the Roman period from Pamphylia and Sidemara are displayed here. The most notable out of these are the Domitias sarcophagus, and the Twelve Labours of Hercules. The list of sarcophagi includes the Heracles Sarcophagus, the Sarcophagus of Domitias Julianus and Domita Philiska, the Sarcophagus of Aurelia Botiane and Demetria, and lastly the Dionysus Sarcophagus of the Attic Type.

=== The Mosaic Hall ===
Here, Byzantine period mosaics found in excavations at Ksantos, and icons, from the region around Antalya are exhibited.

=== Hall of church artefacts ===
Wooden church illuminations depicting the life of Jesus Christ are on display lately. In addition, artefacts depicting Saint Nicholas and his sacred relics are on display preserved in its box.

=== Hall of Small Objects ===
Here, lamps and glass objects dating from the Roman and Byzantine periods, a gold inlay silver tray found by treasure hunters at Kumluca, incense holders and lamps (6th century AD) are exhibited. To the front of the room are lintel figures from a tomb found opposite Lymira.

=== Hall of Coins ===
Examples of gold, electron, silver, and copper coins from the Hellenistic to Ottoman periods are displayed here. The most notable of these are the city and imperial coins.

=== Turkish – Islamic Period Works ===
This room contains examples of Seljuk and Ottoman tiles, Anatolian carpets from the Ottoman period, inscriptions, books, candlesticks, lamps, dervish paraphernalia, etc.

=== Ethnographic Hall ===
Here, clothes, embroidery, weapons, and metal objects from the region of Antalya are being exhibited. One corner of the room has been furnished as a typical Anatolian house for a visual.

=== Children's section ===
A hall at the entrance of the museum was organized as a Children's Museum, which is the first of its kind in Turkey. In the display windows of this section, there are various children's toys and antique moneyboxes. Simple restorations and educational activity opportunities for ceramic sculpture and drawing are provided and their works are presented in the studio section, to make children enjoy museums and antique objects, and to awaken their interests as well.

== Gallery ==
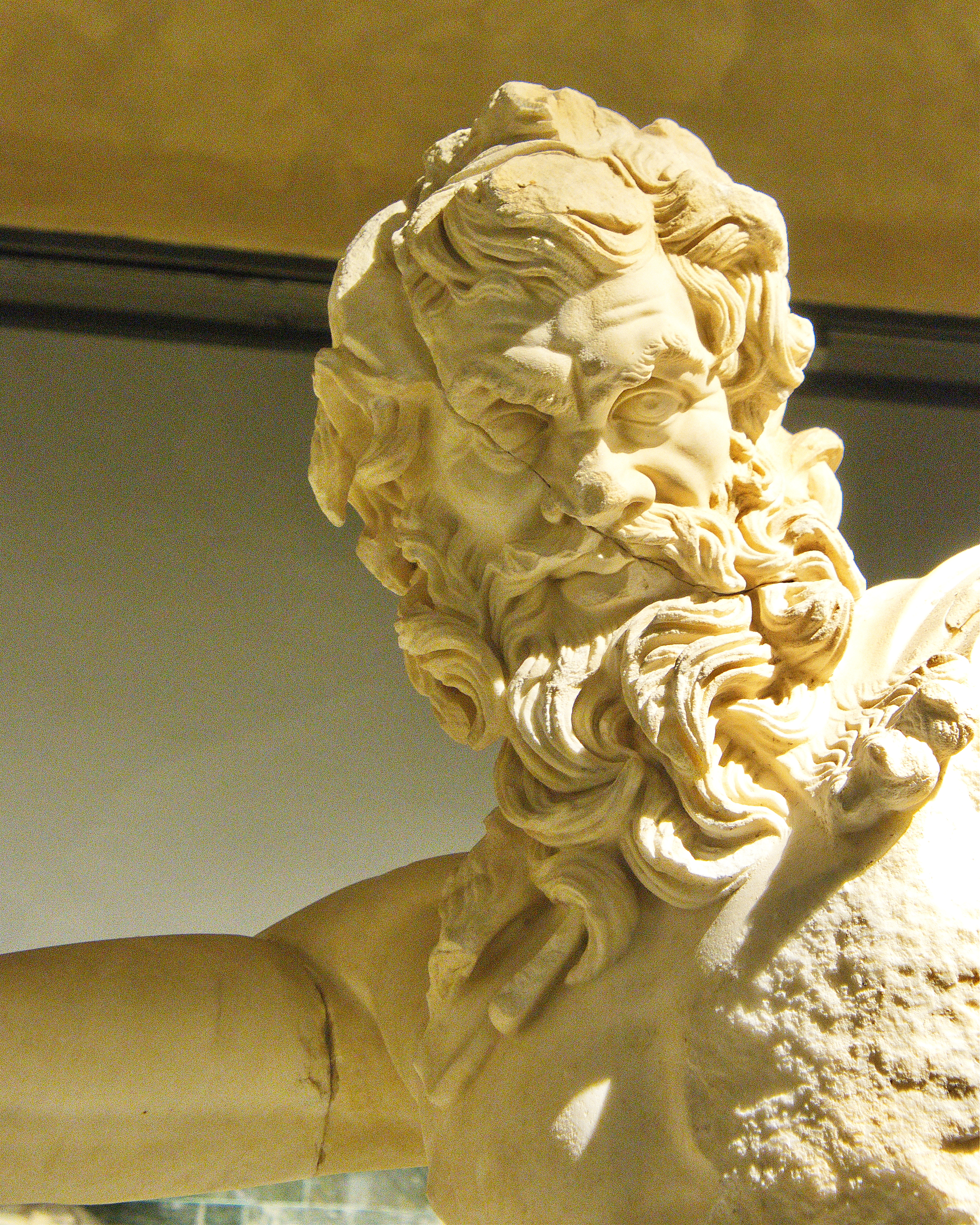
Statue of Marsyas

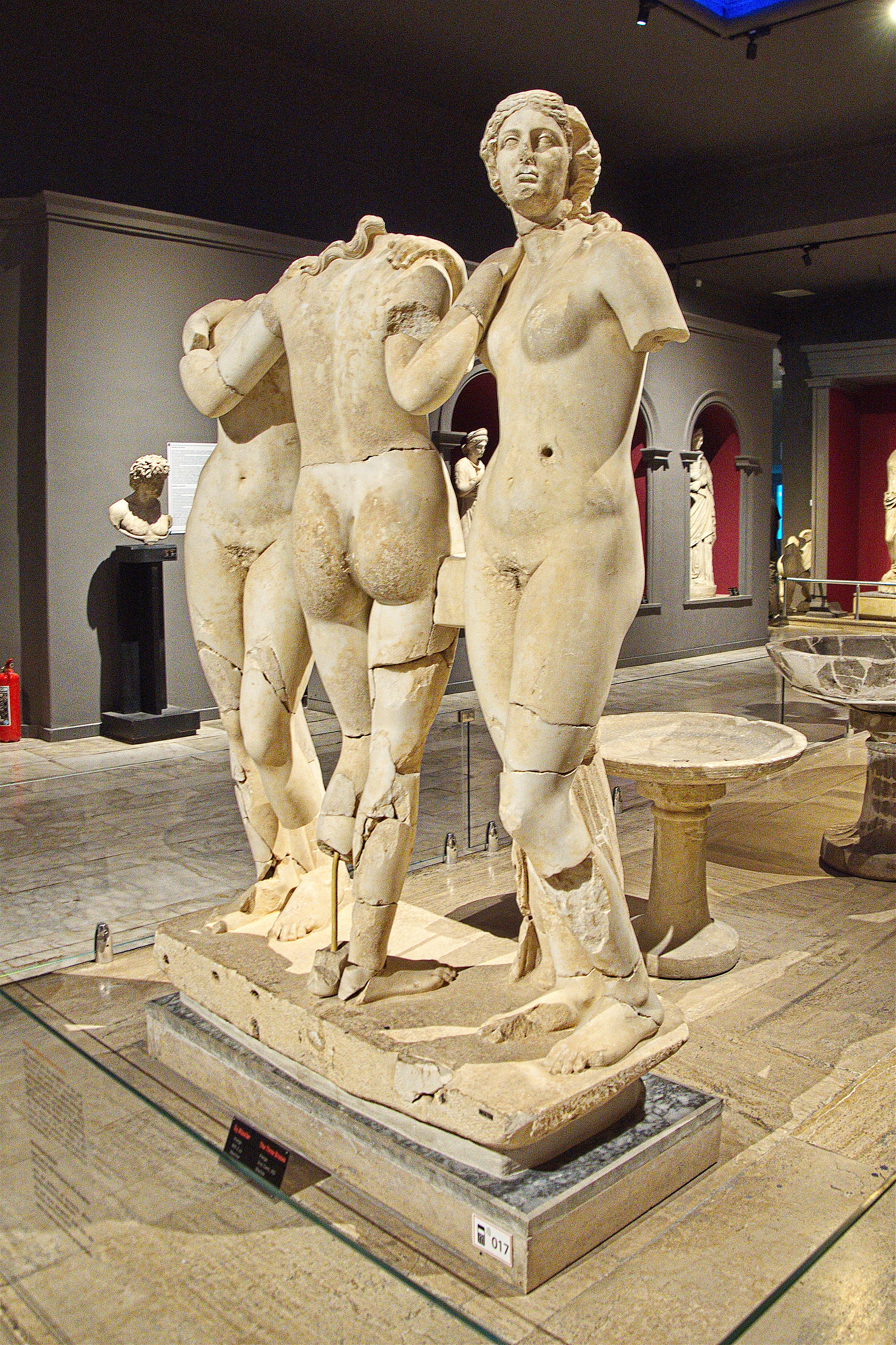
Sculpture of the Three Graces

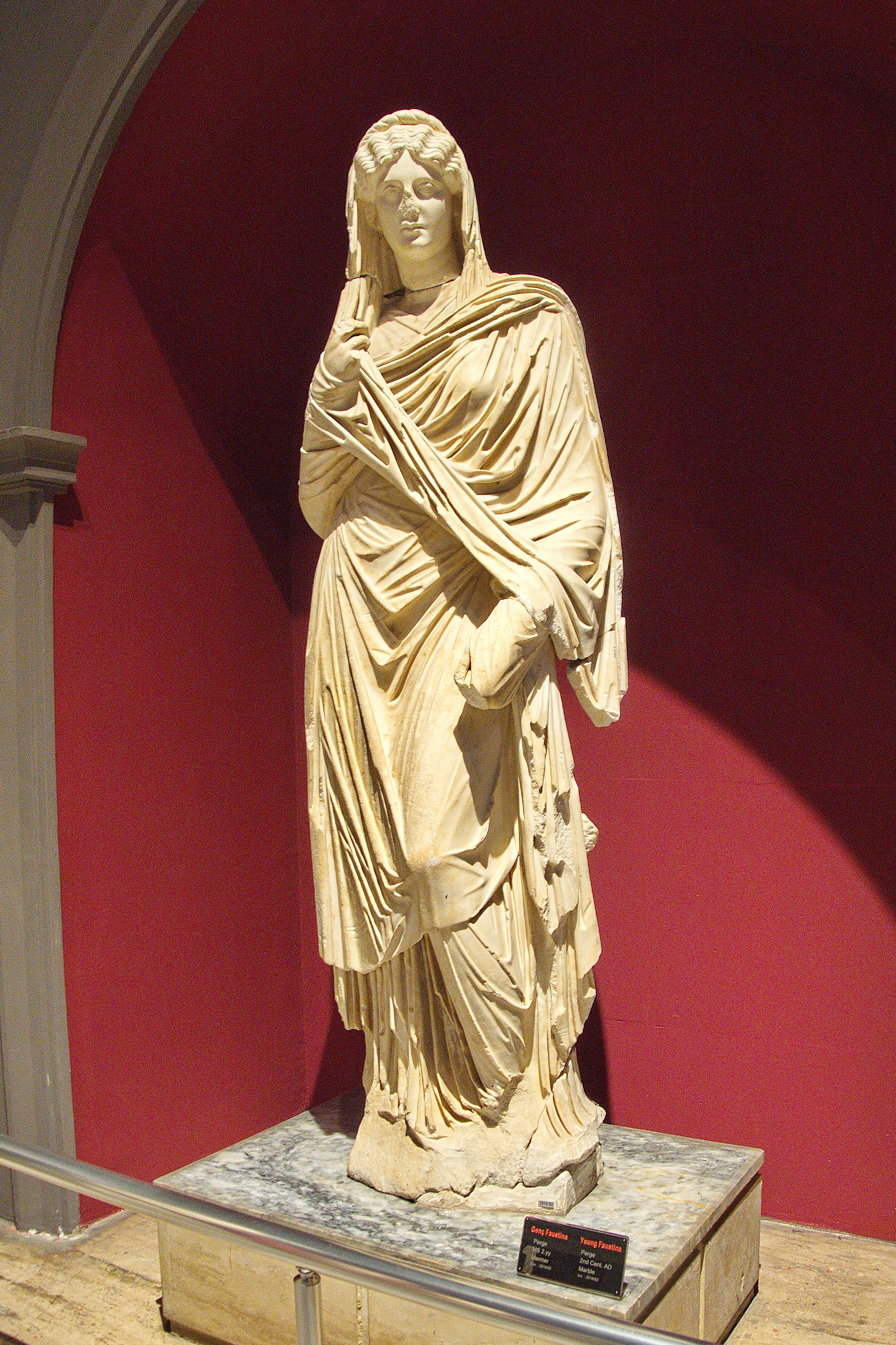
Statue of Faustina

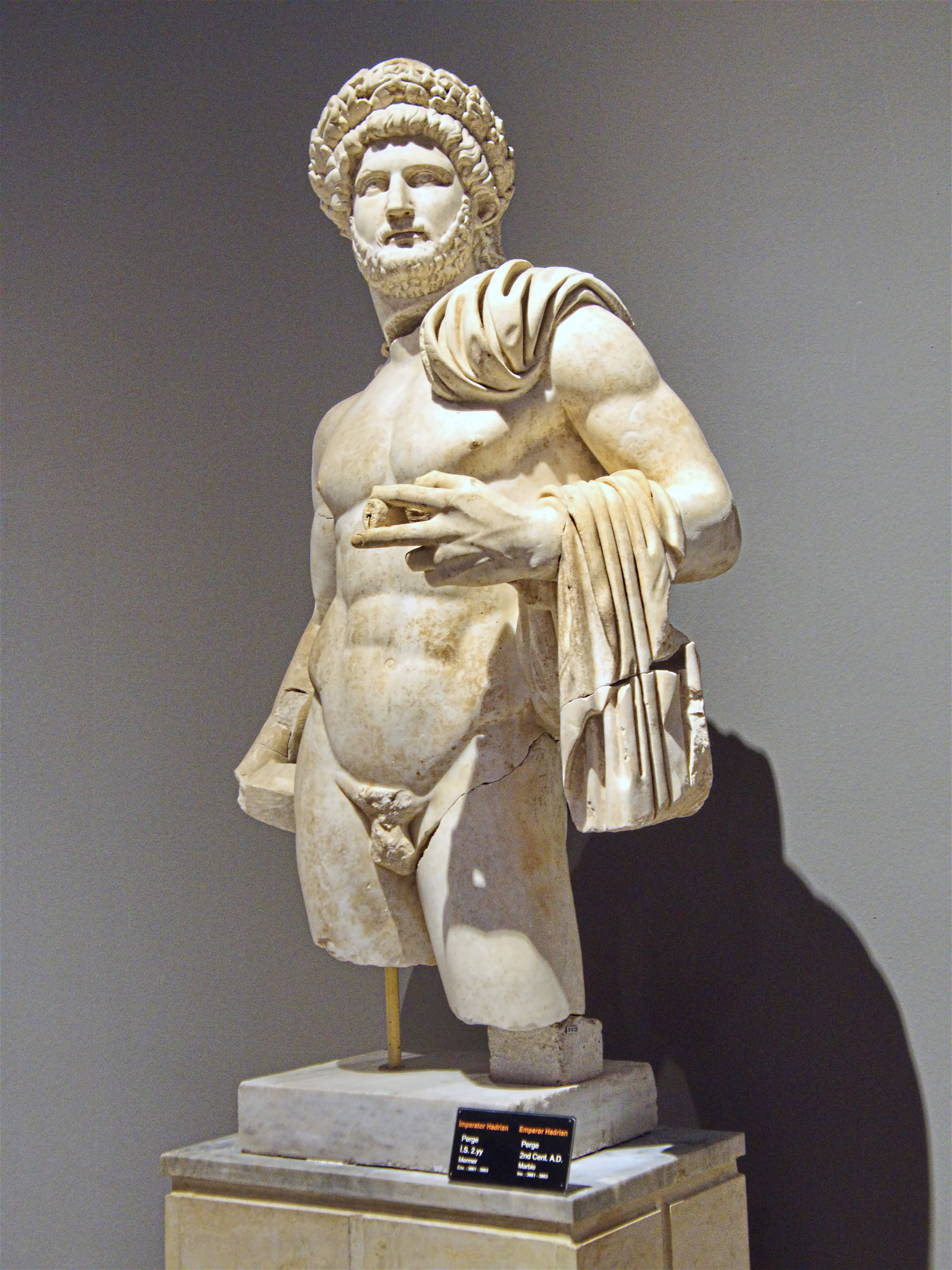
Statue of the Roman emperor Hadrian

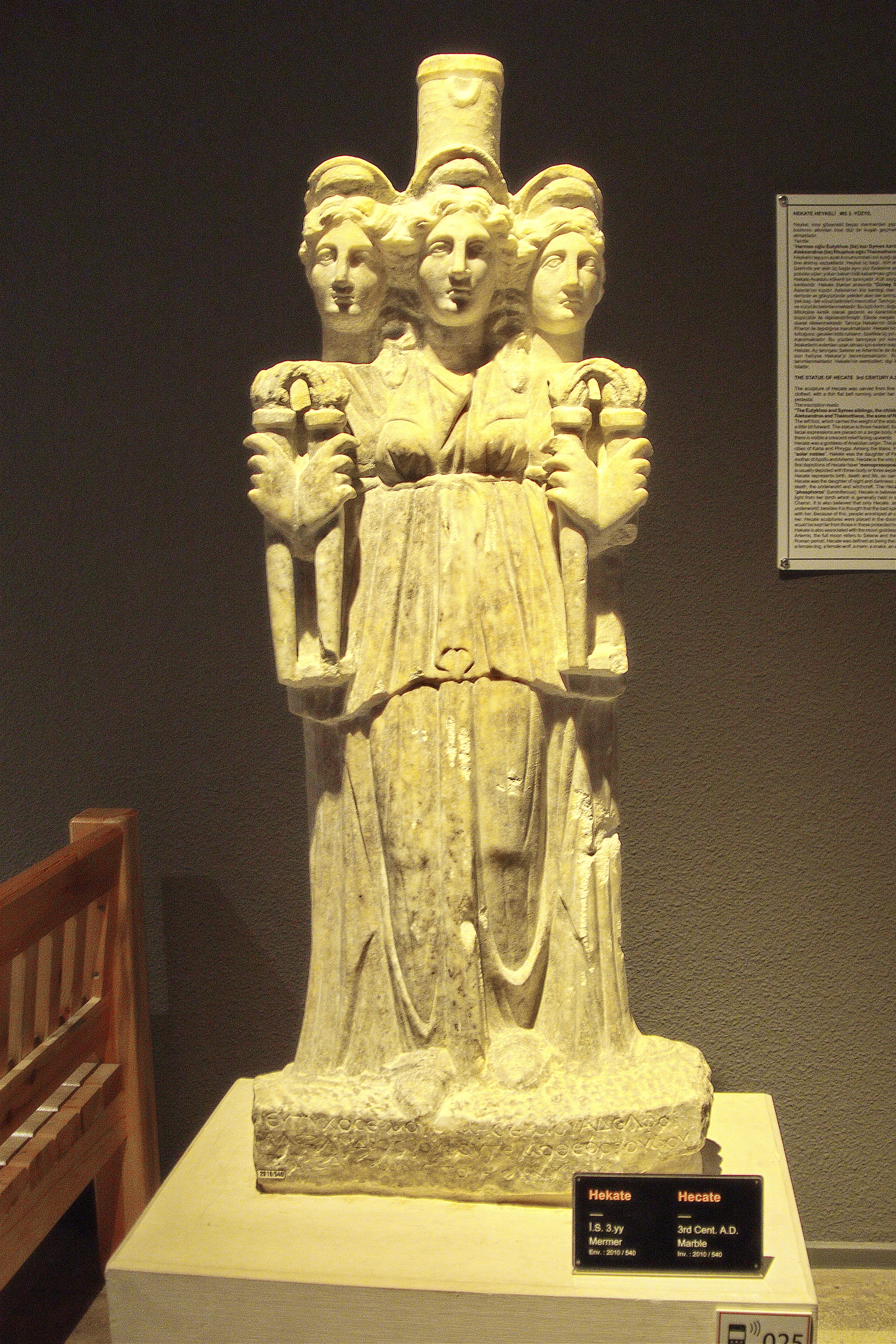
Statue of Hecate

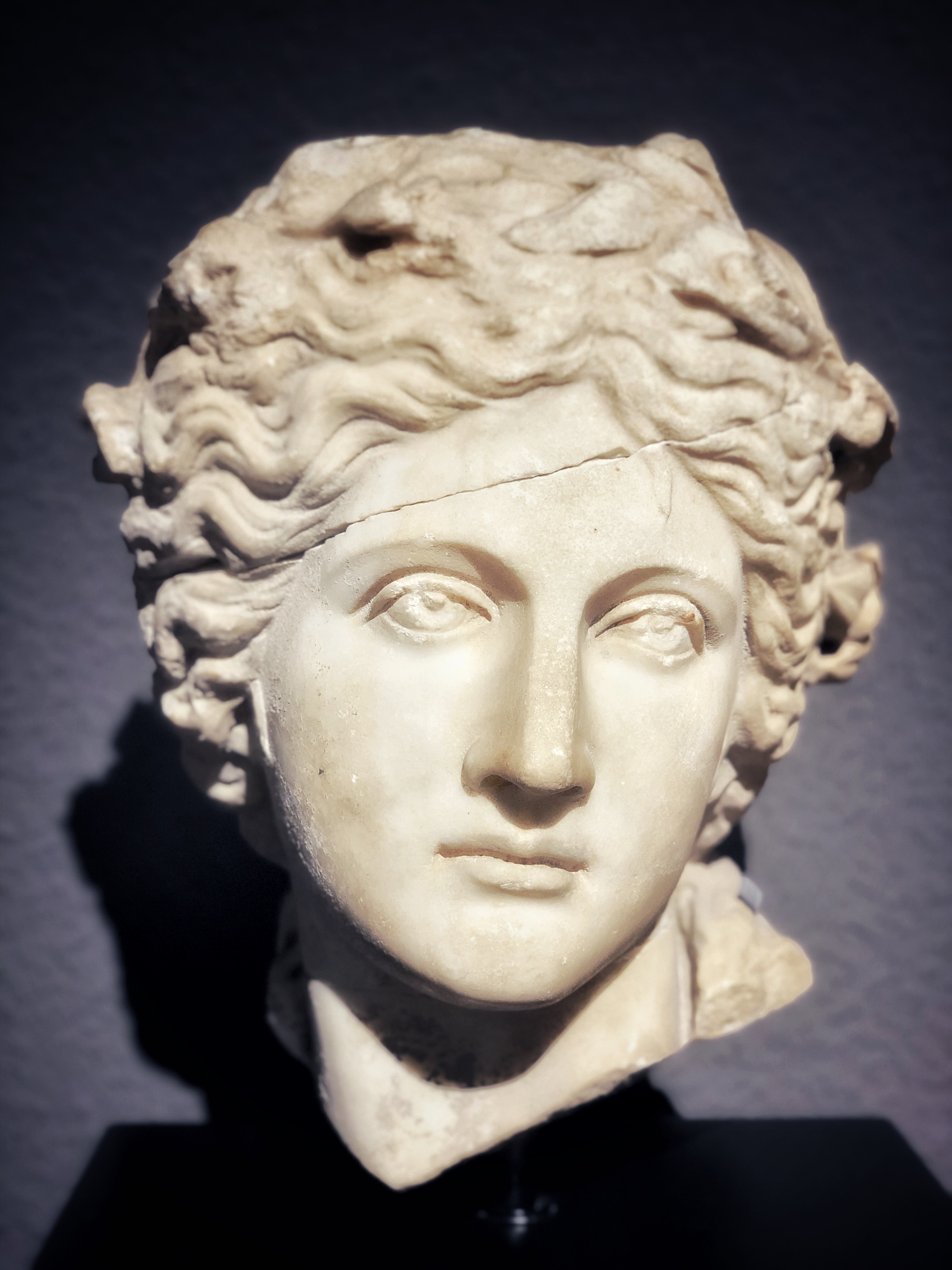
Head of Apollo

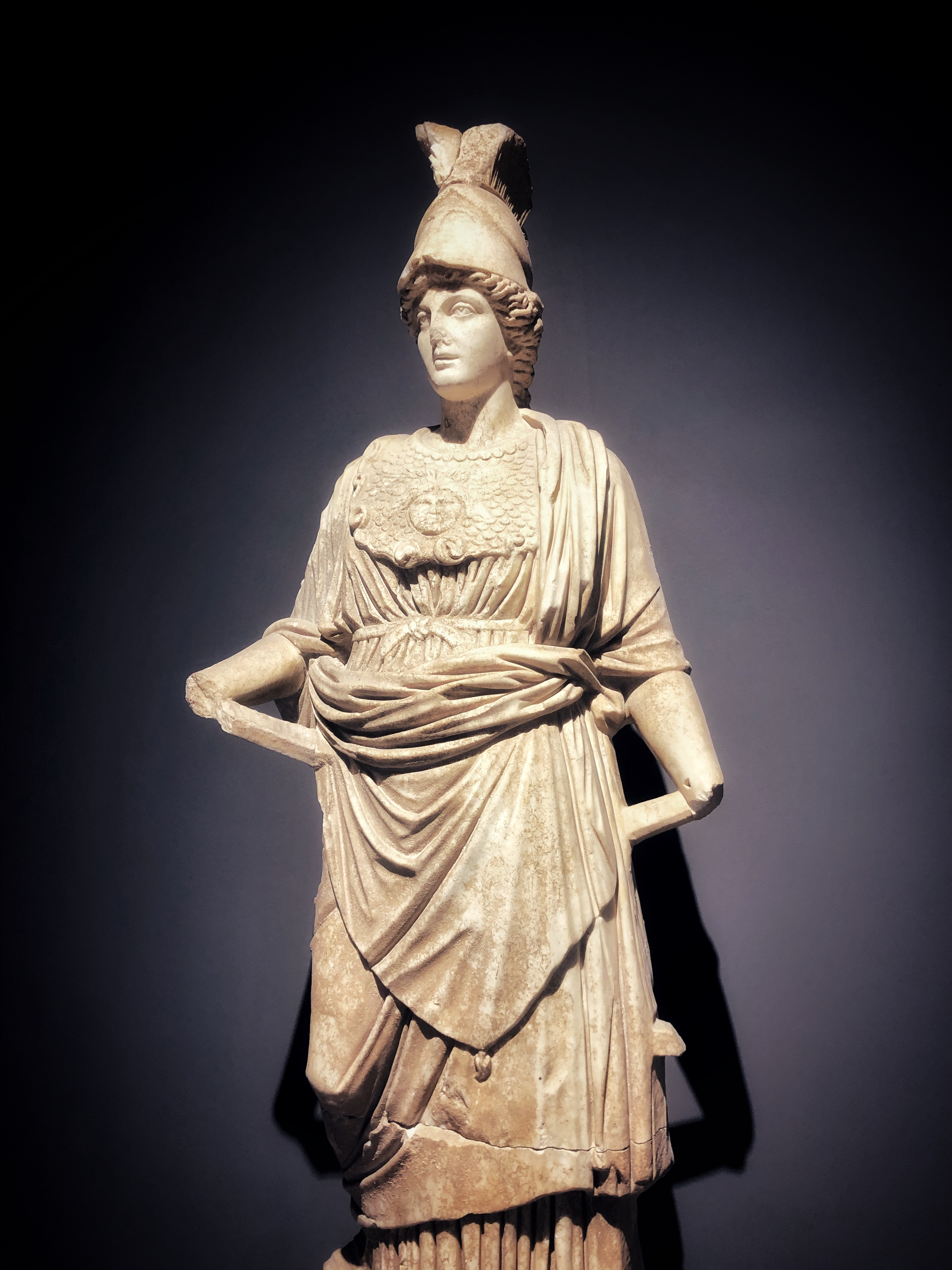
Statue of Minerva

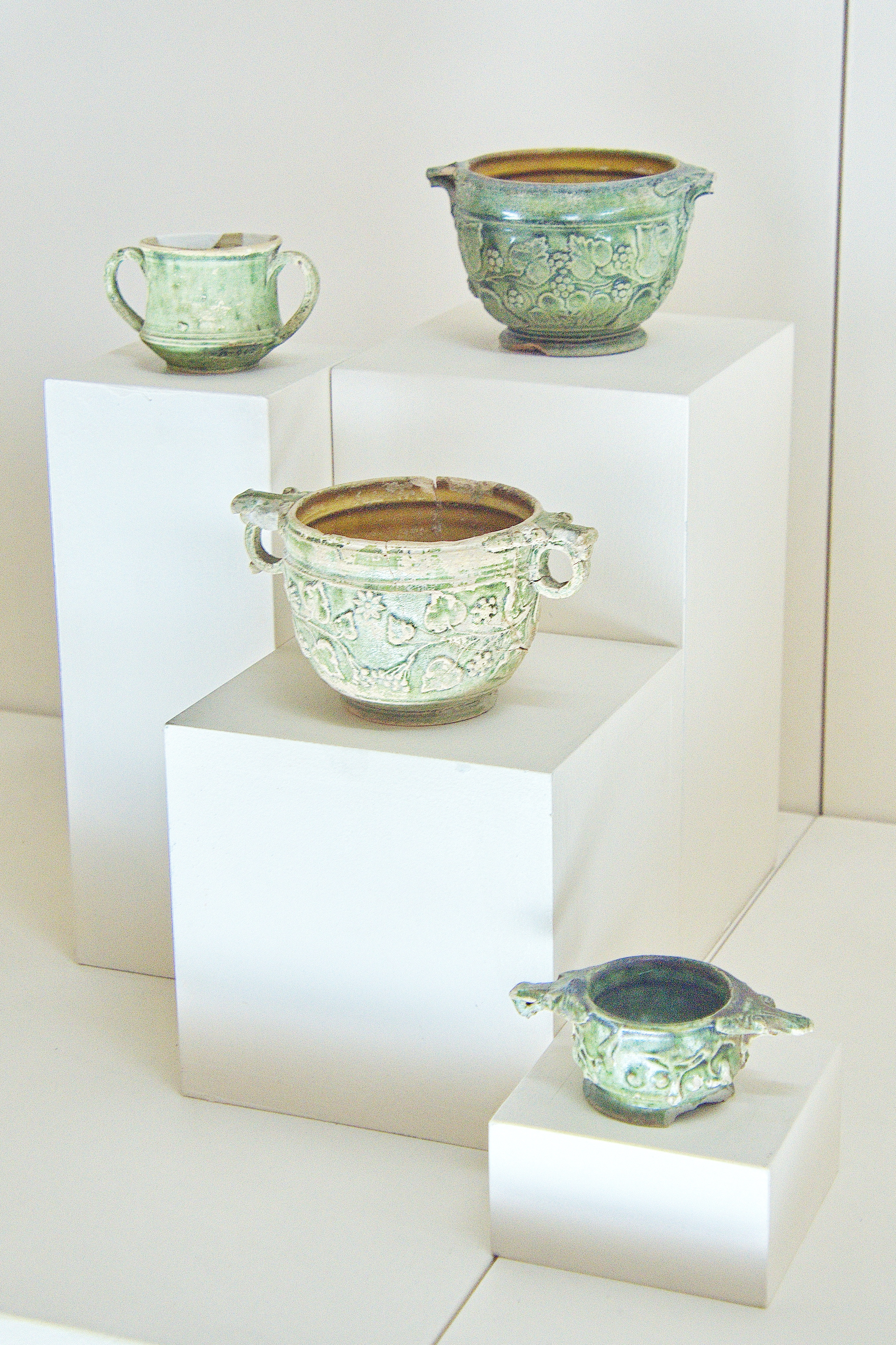
Pottery in the museum

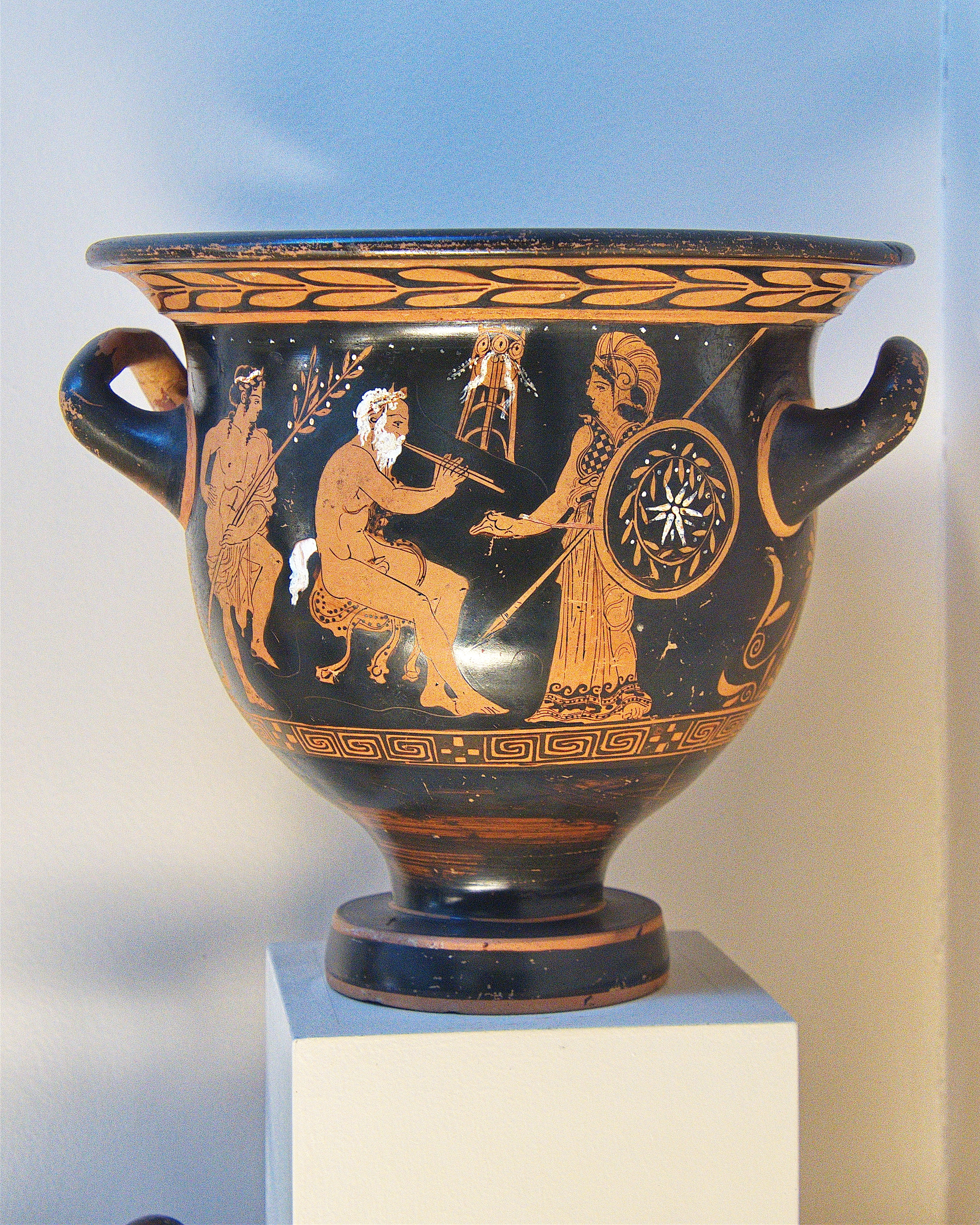
Ancient Greek pottery

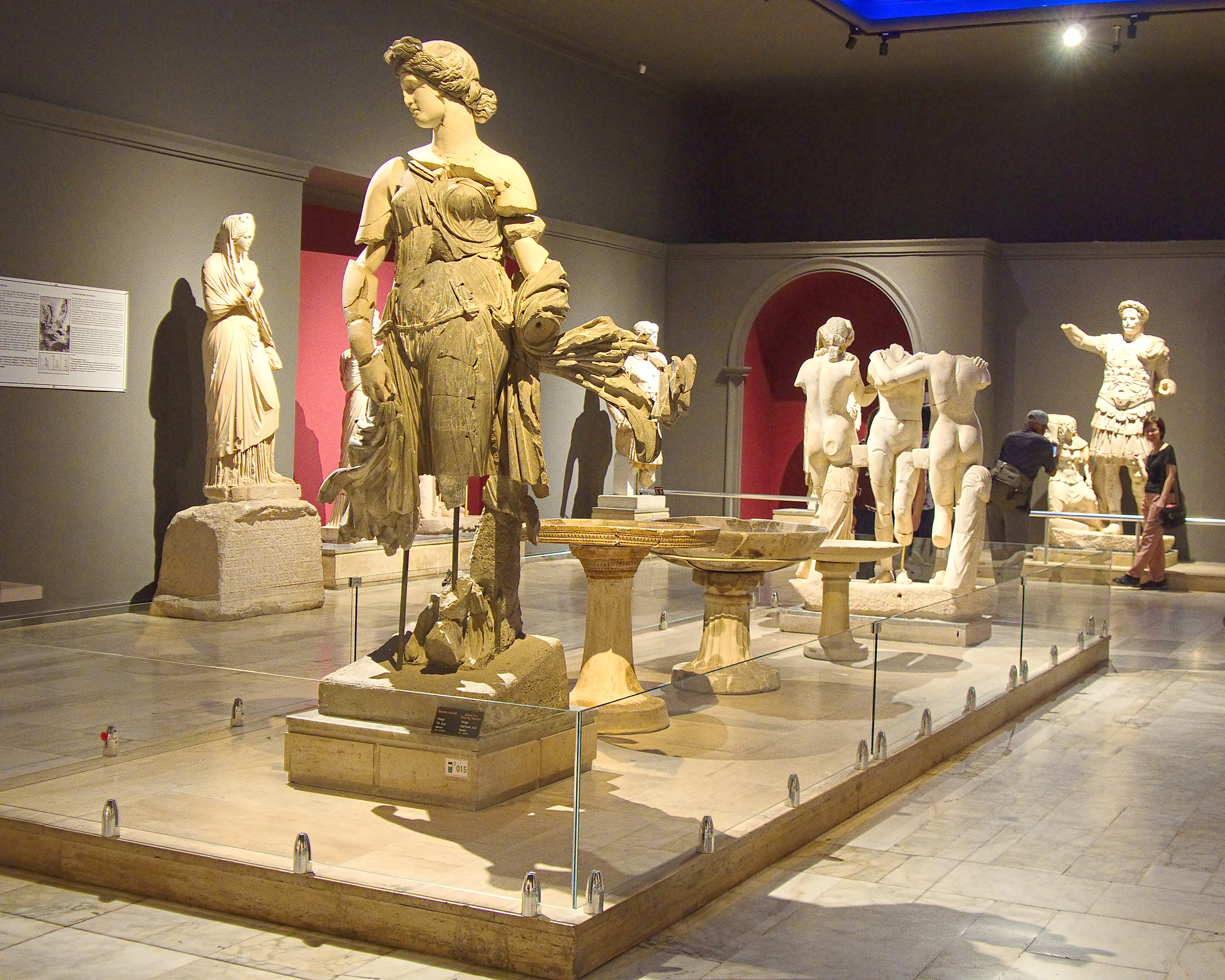
Marble statue of a dancing woman, from Perge, 2nd century AD

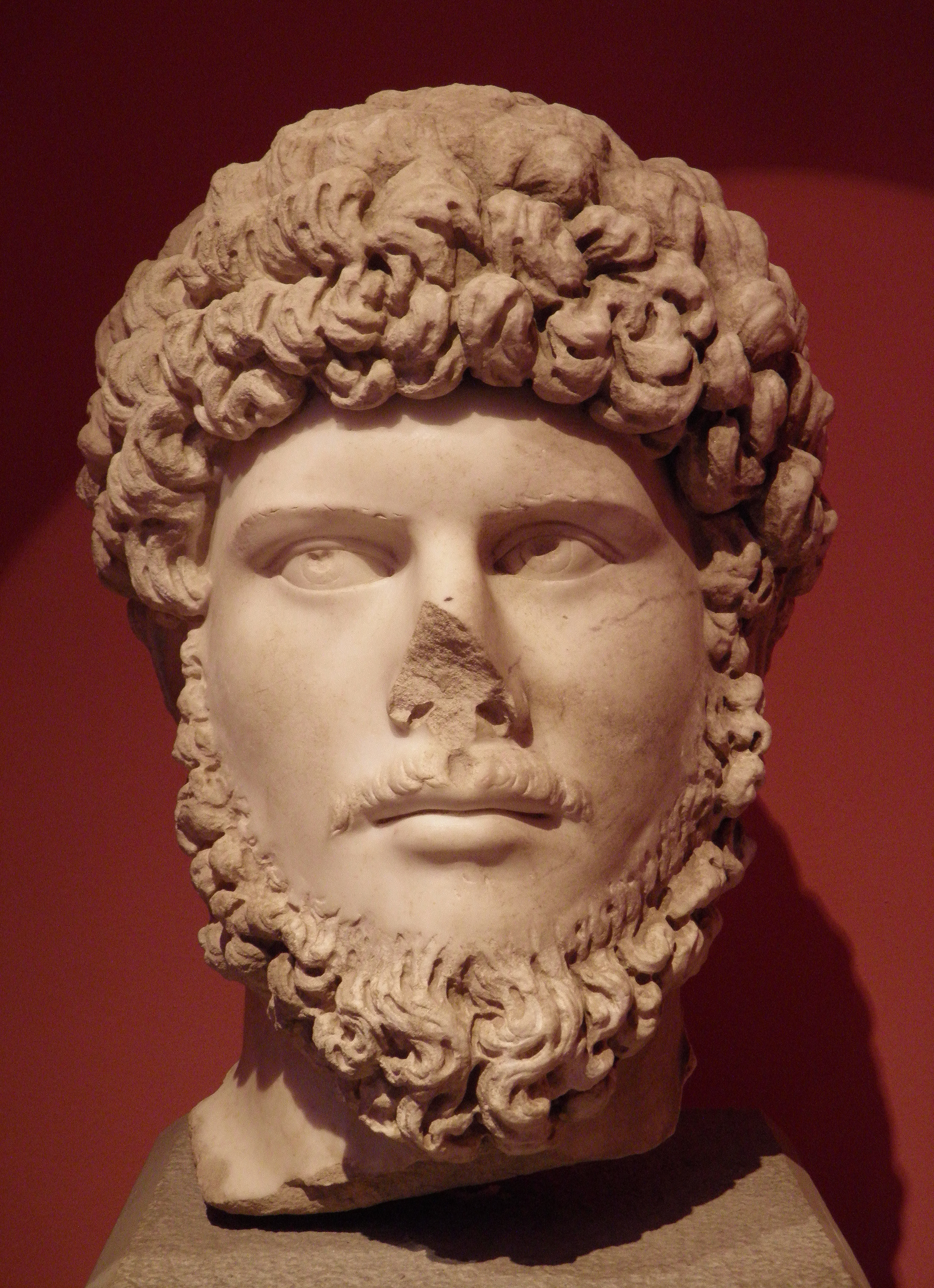
Head of Lucius Verus from Perge

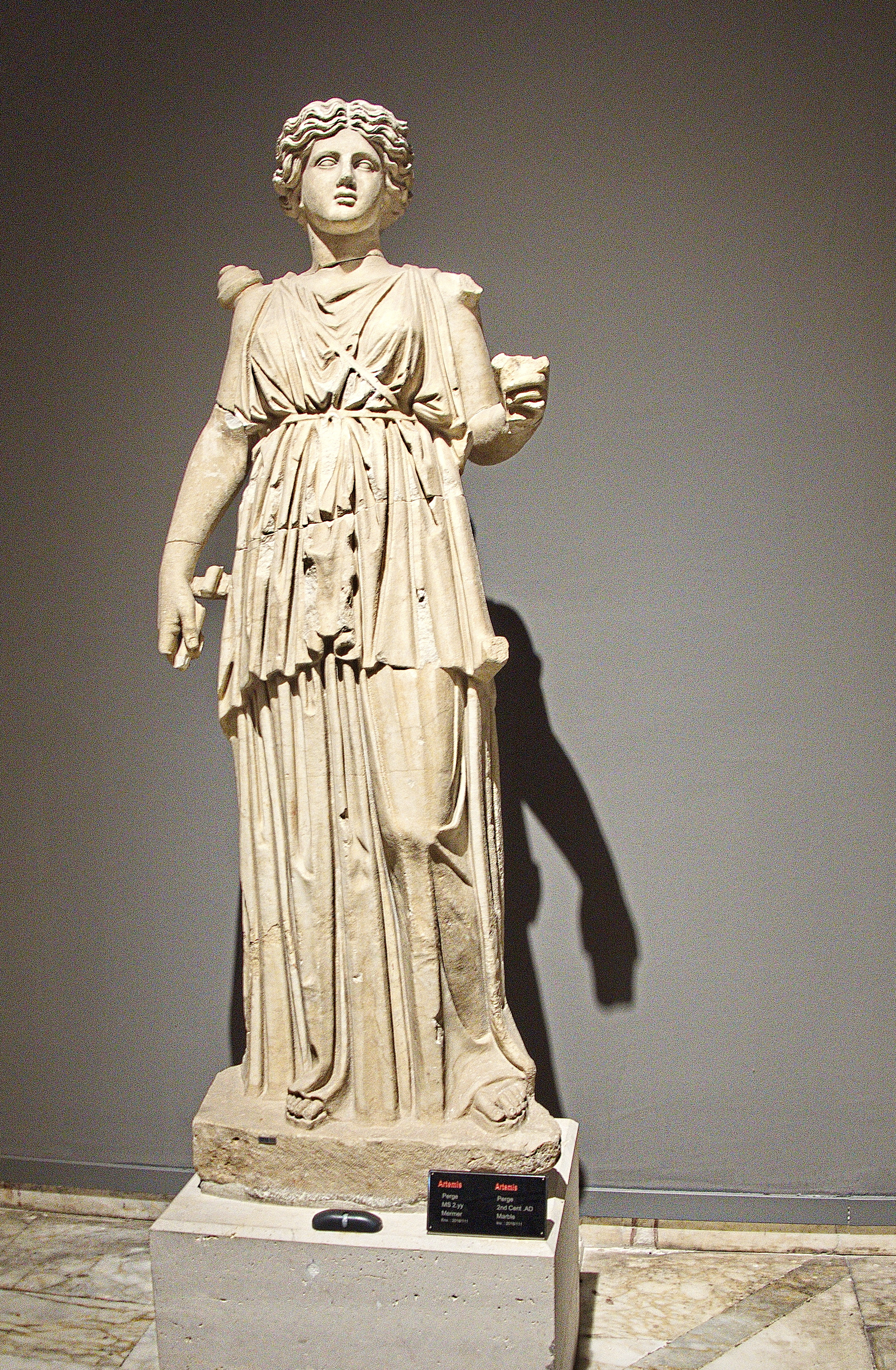
Statue of Artemis

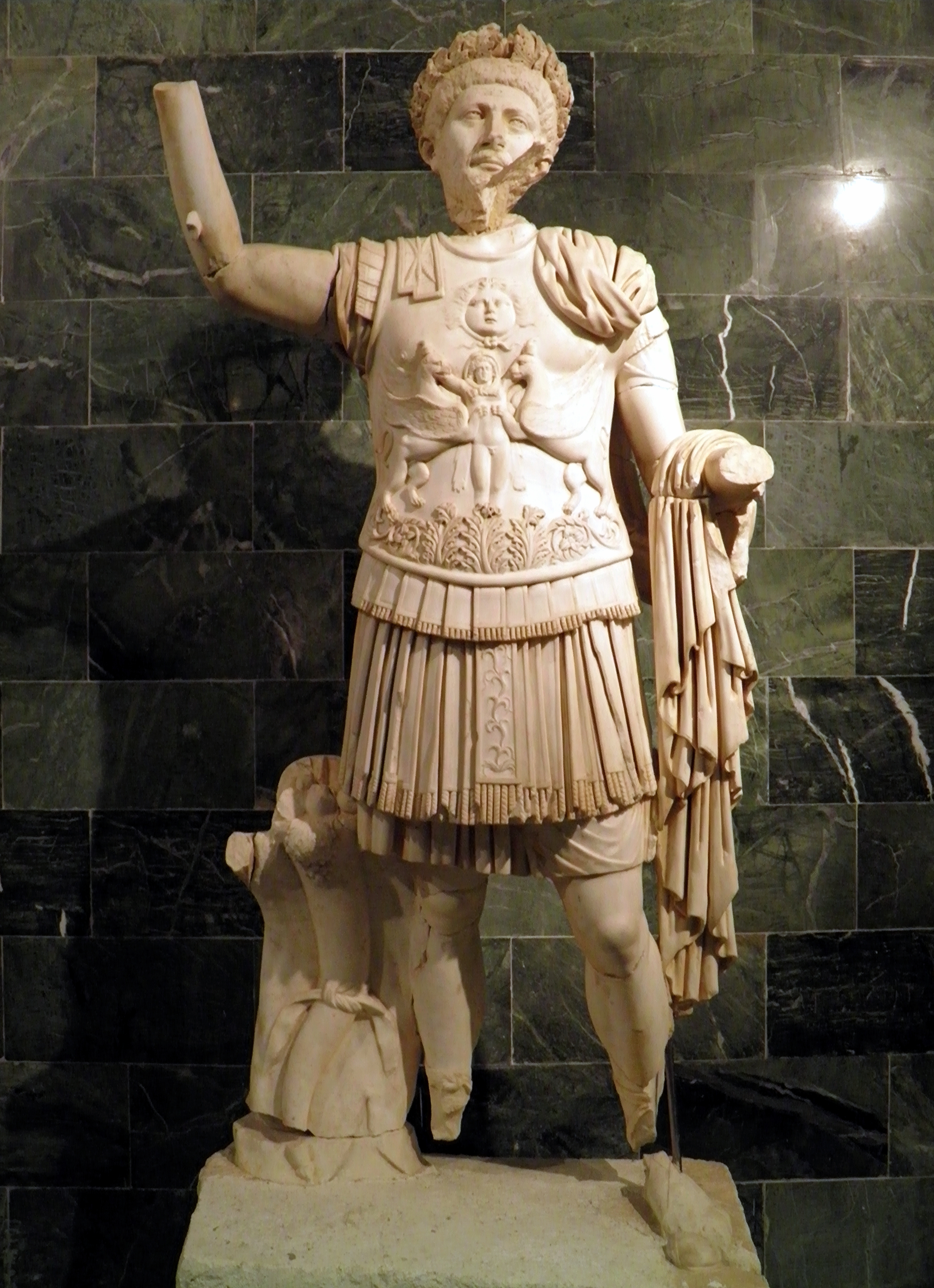
Marble statue of Trajan

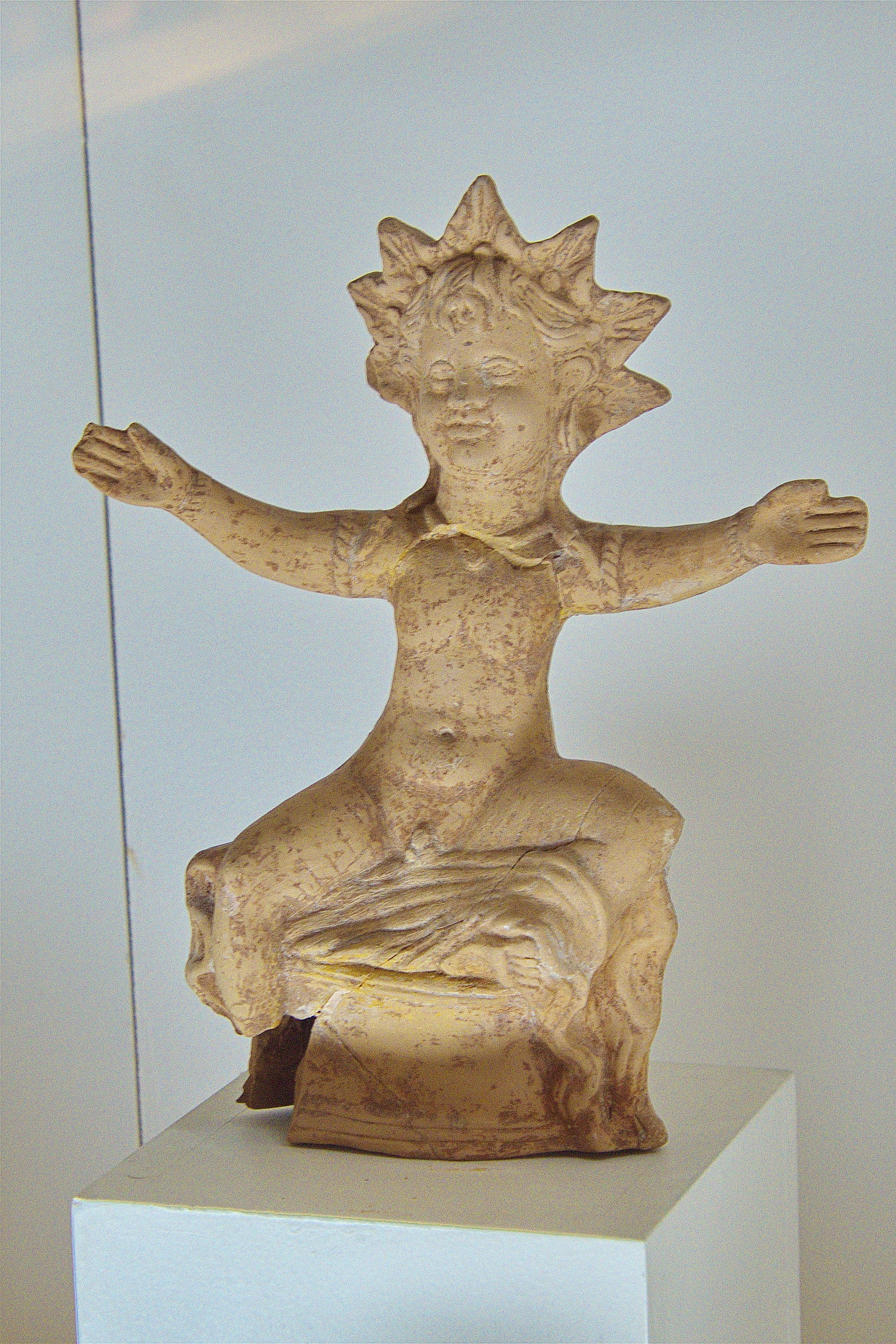
Statue of a sun god

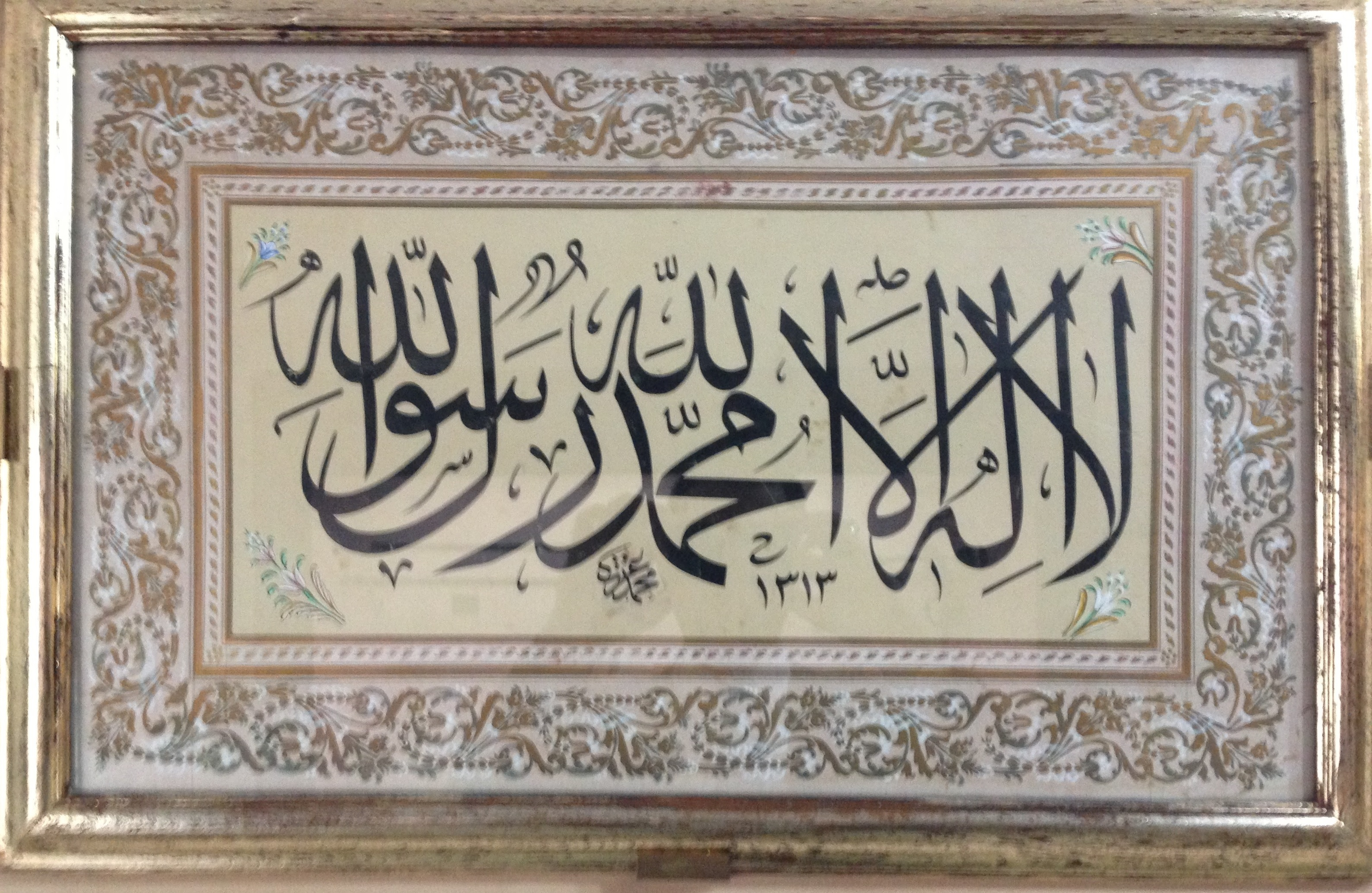
The Testimony of Faith in Thuluth calligraphy by Kazasker Zade Mehmet Izzet Efendi, 1313 AH (1895 AD)

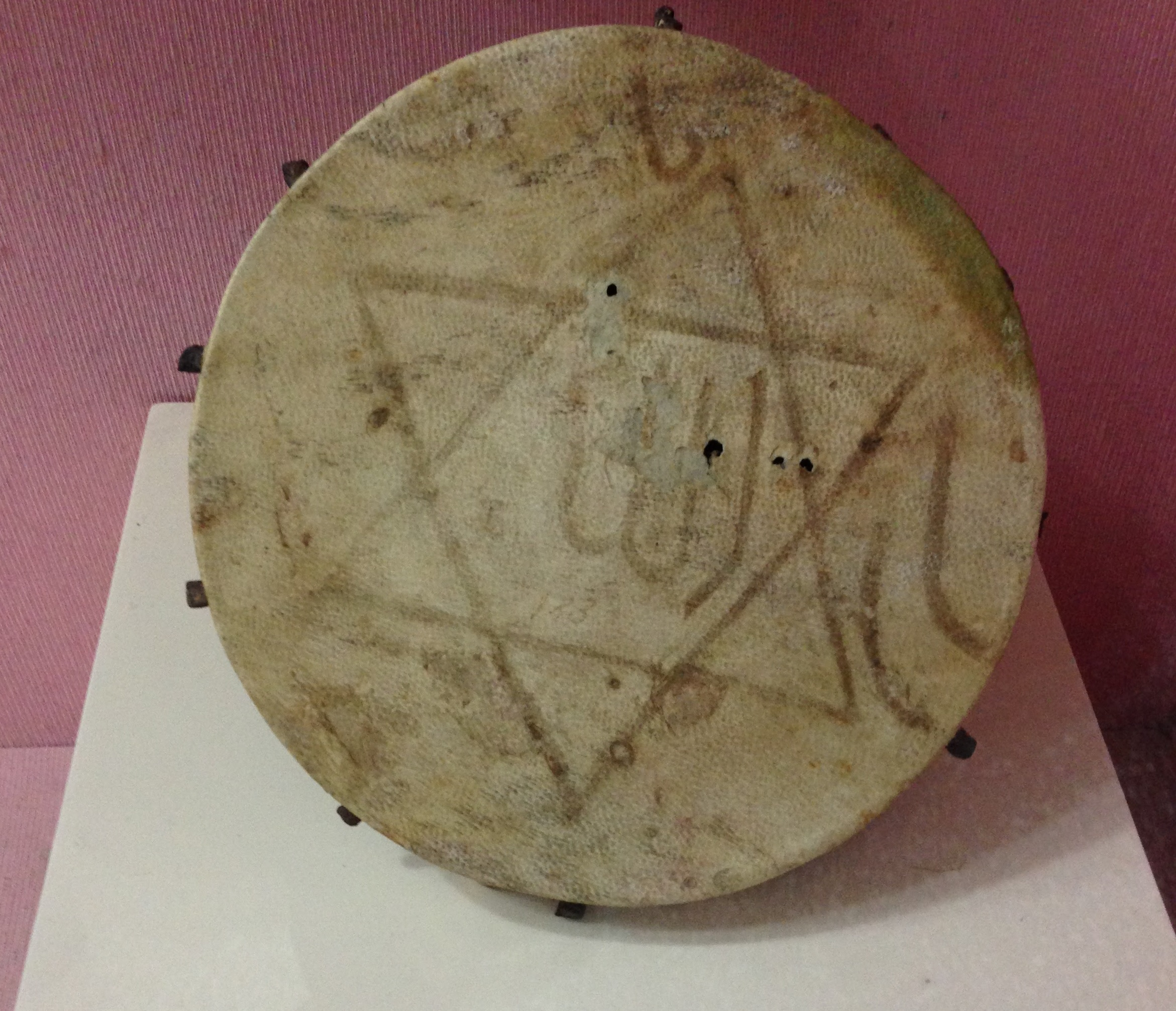
A daf used in dargah spiritual music of Antalya during the Ottoman period

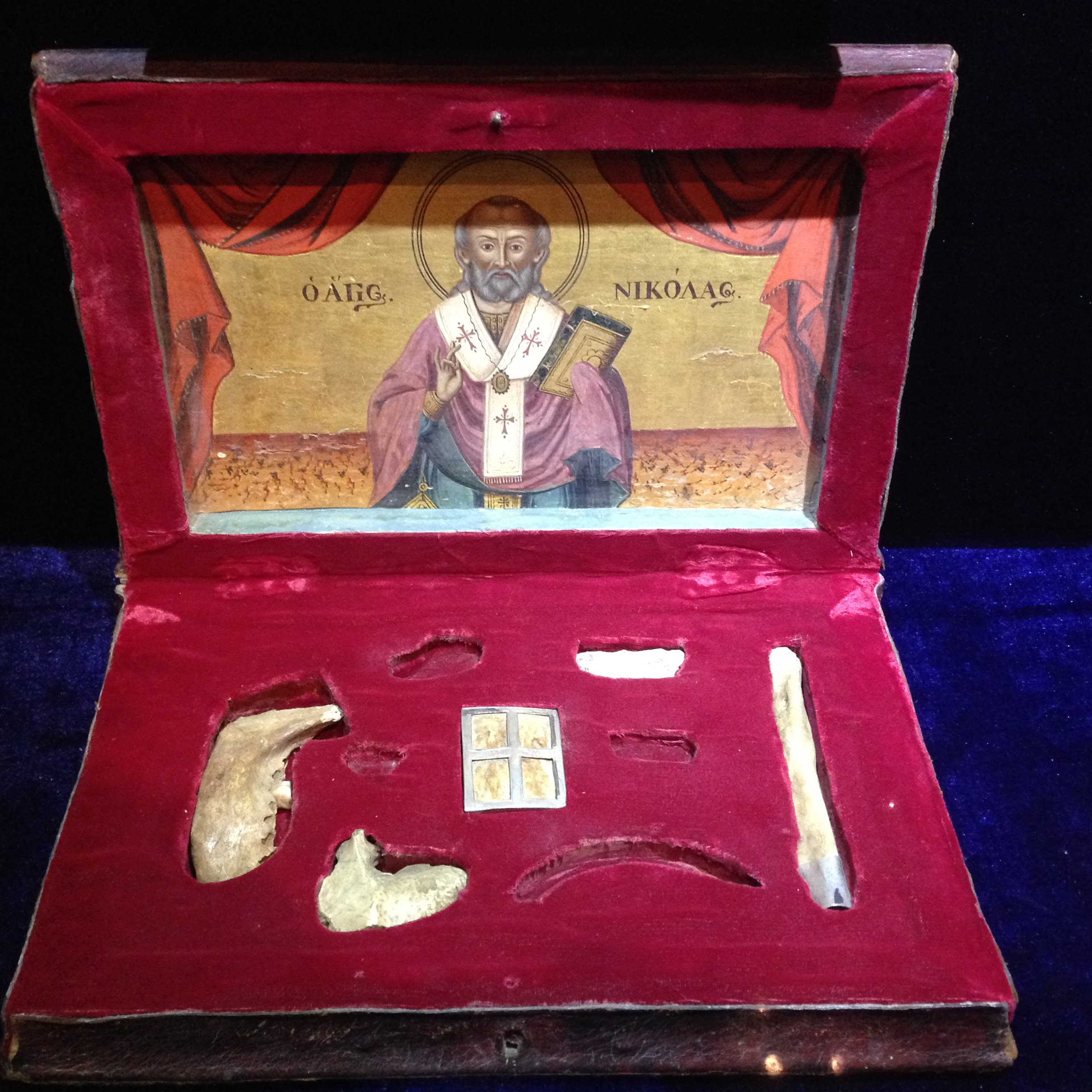
Relics of the bones of Saint Nicholas

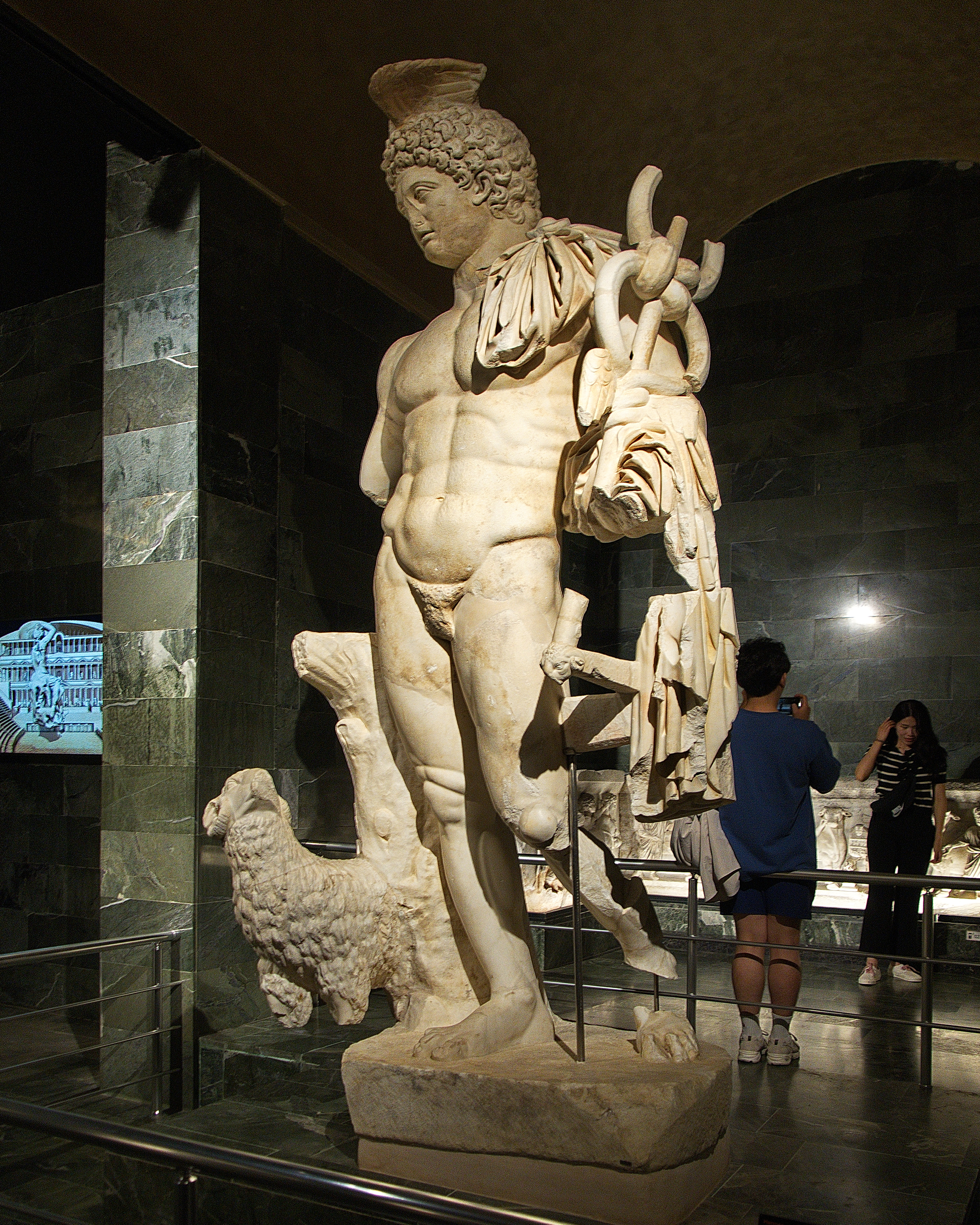
Statue of Hermes from the Theatre of Perge

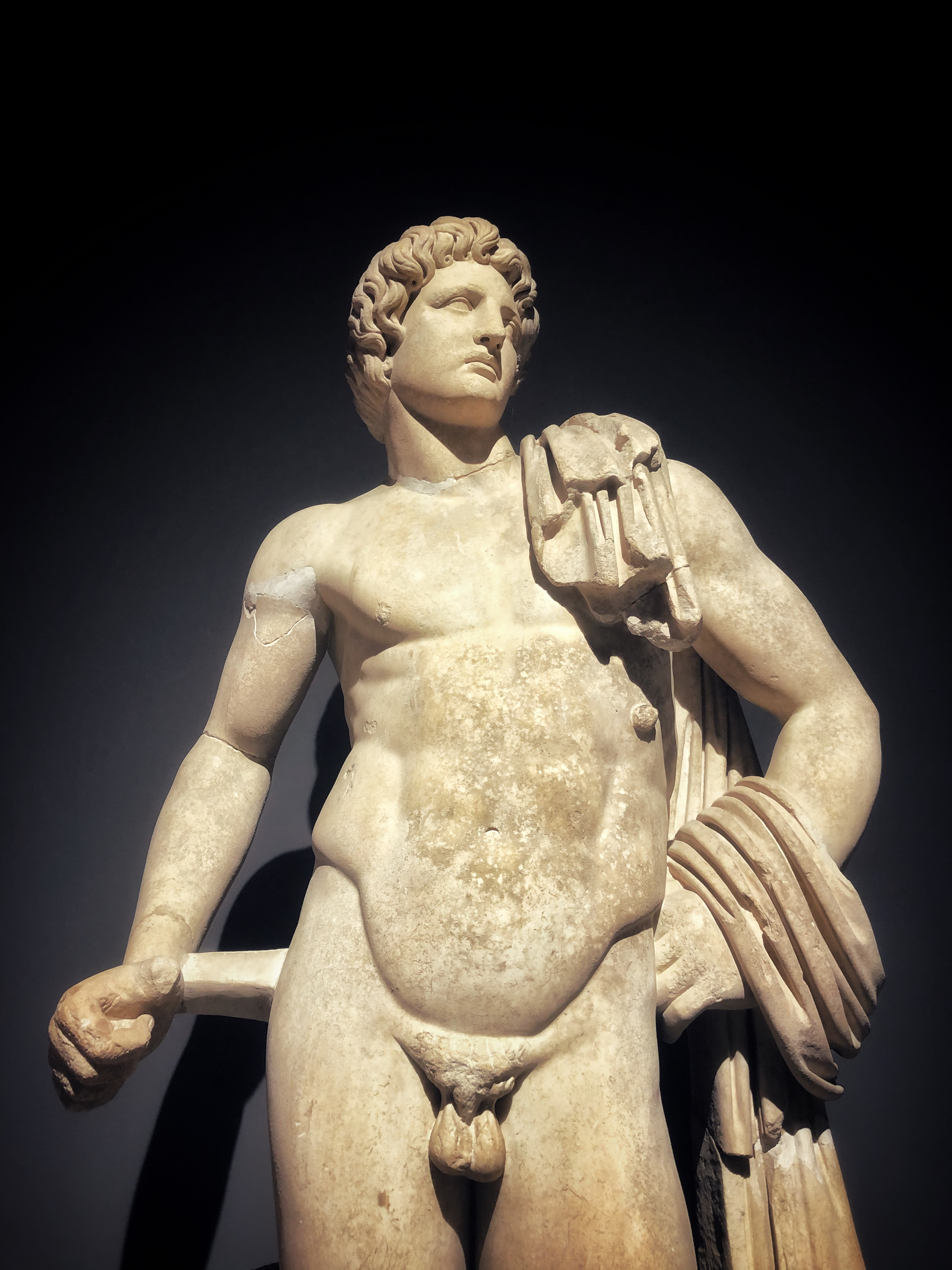
Statue of Apollo

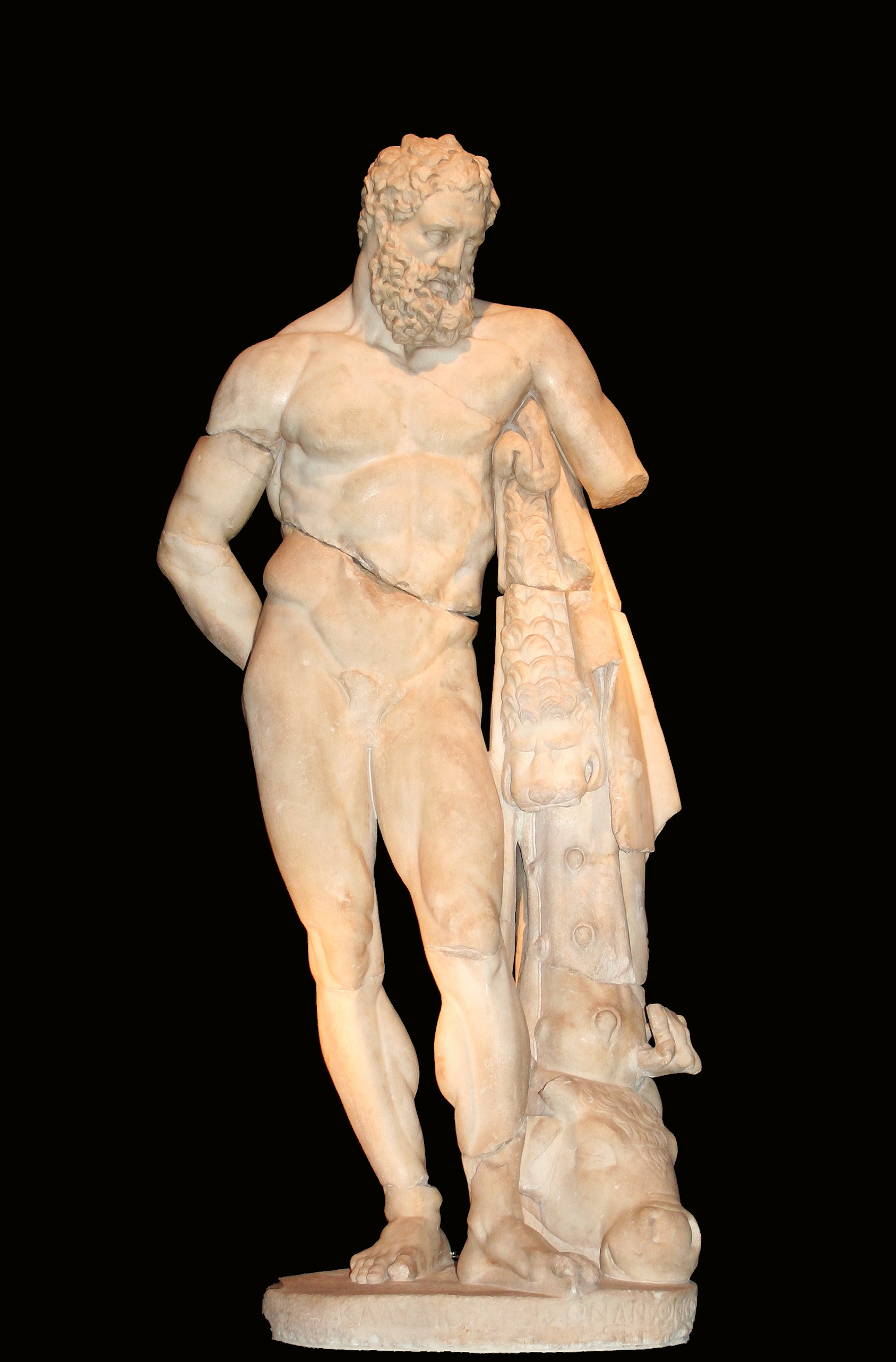
Statue of Hercules

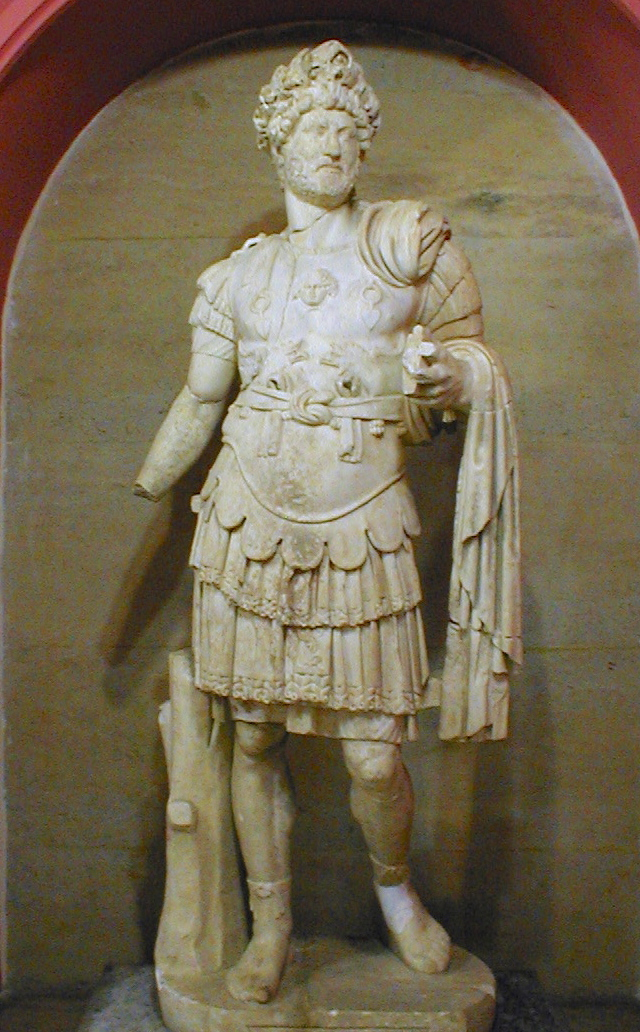
Another statue of the emperor Hadrian

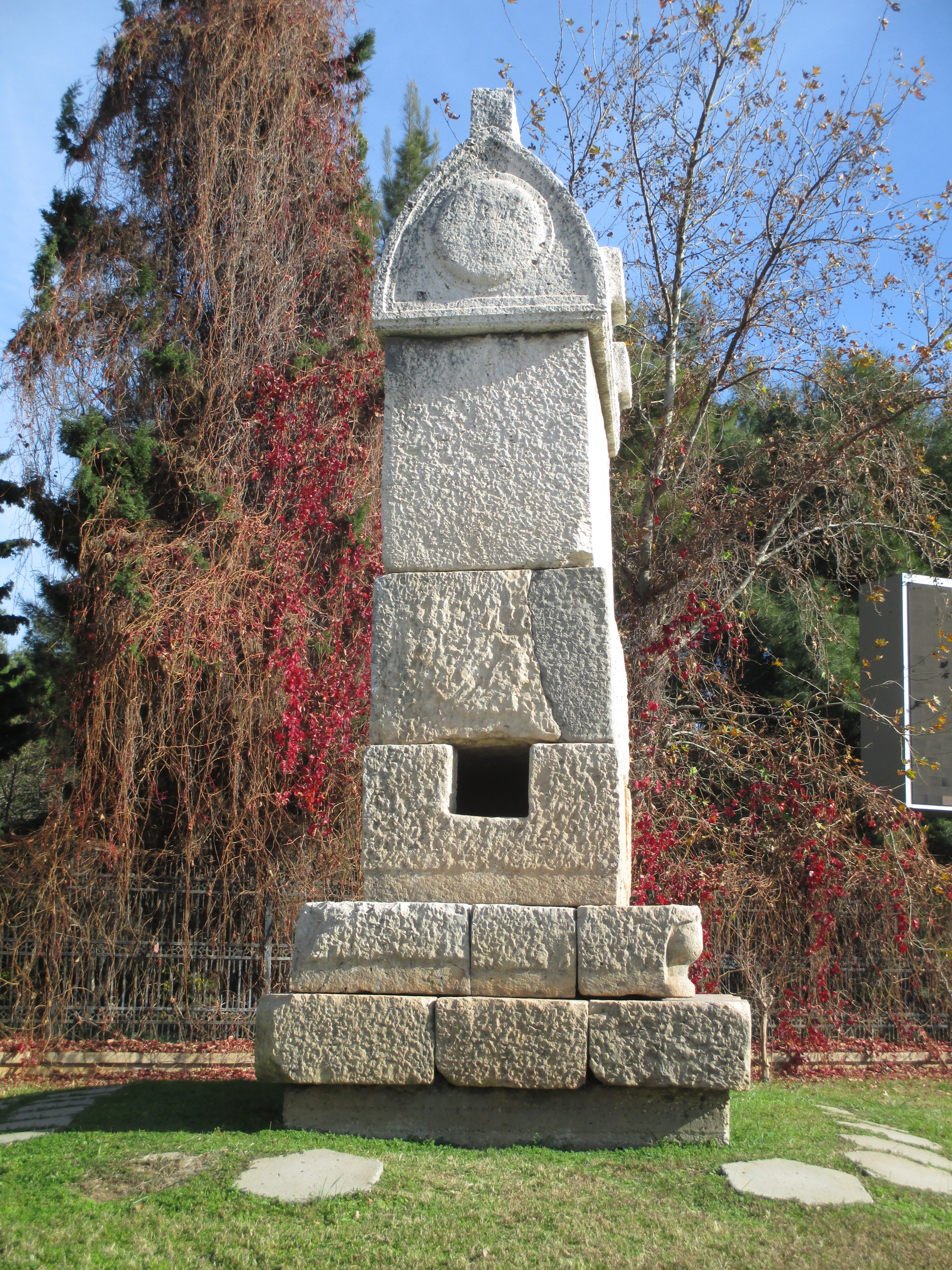
Lycian sarcophagus in the museum courtyard

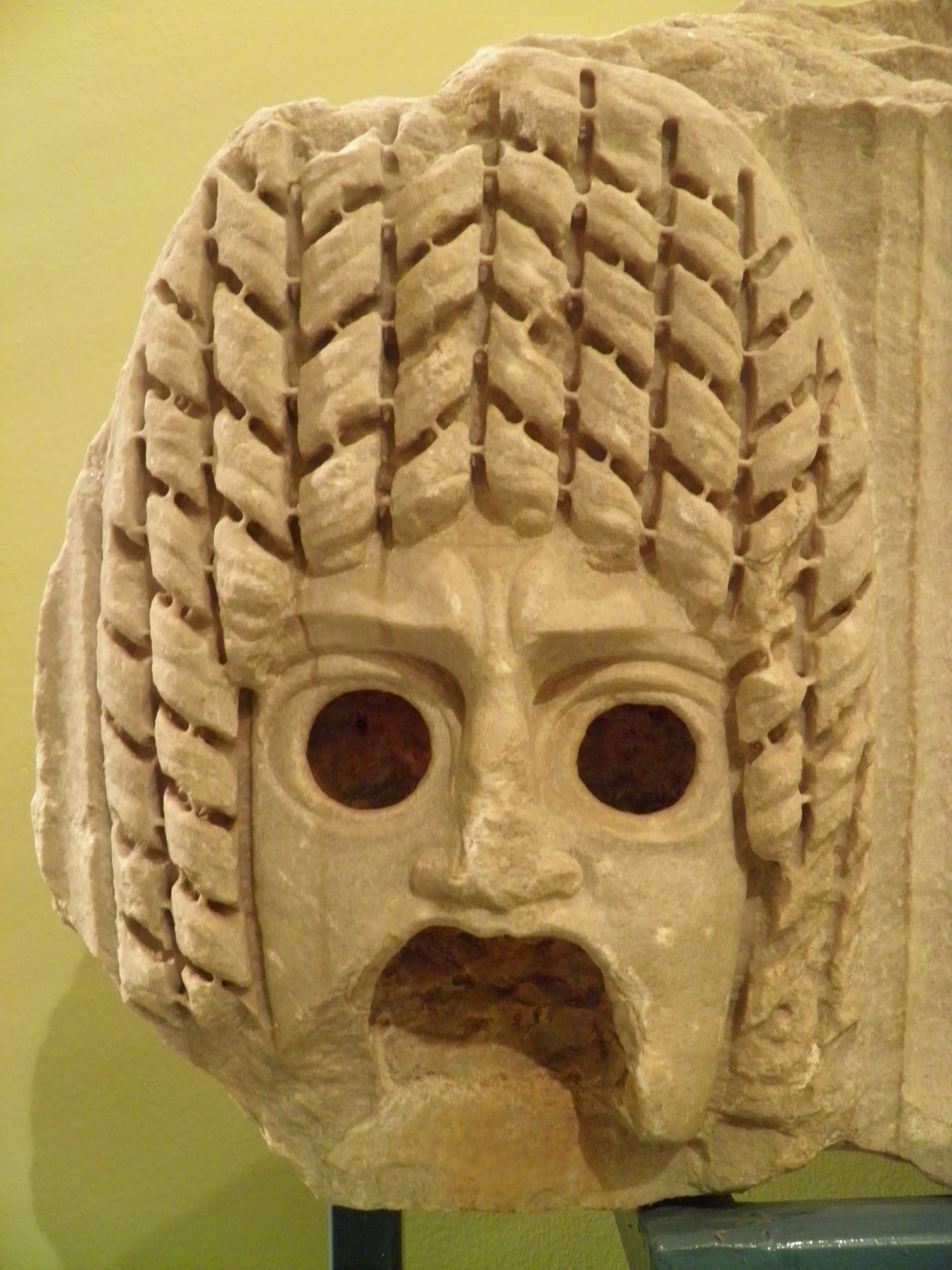
Ancient Greek theater mask

== See also ==
- Antalya
- Istanbul Archaeology Museum
- Museum of Anatolian Civilizations
