= List of shopping malls in Istanbul =

This is a list of notable historical and modern shopping malls in Istanbul, Turkey.

== Historic ==
- Grand Bazaar (Turkish: Kapalıçarşı/Büyük Çarşı, lit. 'covered market/grand market', 1461), Fatih
- Spice Bazaar (Turkish: Mısır Çarşısı, "Egyptian Bazaar", 1660), Fatih

== Modern ==
- AVM = Turkish: Alışveriş merkezi ("Shopping center")
- GLA = Gross leasable area

Anchors: BE=Beymen, BO=Boyner, V=Vakko, Dec=Decathlon, MM=MediaMarkt

Name	Open	Neighborhood	District	m^{2}	Anchors					
Akasya	2014	Acıbadem	Üsküdar	80,000			V			
Airport Outlet Center		Ataköy	Bakırköy							LC Waikiki
Akbatı		Koza	Esenyurt							LC Waikiki
Akmerkez	1993	Etiler	Beşiktaş	35,000			V			
Akyaka Park		Saray	Ümraniye							LC Waikiki
Anatolium Mall	2018	Soğanlık	Kartal	35,000					MM	LC Waikiki; Migros; IKEA; Paribu Cineverse; Koçtaş Fix; Adore Mobilya
Aqua Florya	2012	Şenlikköy	Bakırköy	53,000**	BE					Istanbul Aquarium; Cinemaximum cinemas; Theater
ArmoniPark Outlet Center		Tevfik Bey	Küçükçekmece							LC Waikiki
Ataköy A Plus	2010	Ataköy	Bakırköy	25,000**	BE					MacFit gym 2,266 m^{2}; 2M Migros 2,500 m^{2}; Marks & Spencer
Atirus	2005	Fatih	Büyükçekmece	56,000						
Atlas Park		Abdurrahmangazi	Sultanbeyli							LC Waikiki
Beylikdüzü Migros		Barış	Beylikdüzü							LC Waikiki
Brandium		Küçükbakkalköy	Ataşehir						MM	DeFacto; Koçtaş home improvement; Macrocenter; Paribu Cineverse; TeknoSA
Canpark		Yaman Evler	Ümraniye							LC Waikiki
Capacity		Ataköy	Bakırköy							LC Waikiki
Capitol	1993	Altunizade	Üsküdar	73,000		BO				
Carousel	1995	Zeytinlik	Bakırköy	76,500				Dec		
Cevahir	2005	19 Mayıs	Şişli	110,000		BO		Dec		
City's İstanbul		İçerenköy	Ataşehir					Dec		
Emaar Square Mall		Ünalan	Üsküdar						MM	LC Waikiki; Koçtaş home improvement; Evidea home goods; Address hotel
Deposite		Başak	Başakşehir							LC Waikiki
Forum Istanbul		Kocatepe	Bayrampaşa	176,380		BO		Dec	MM	IKEA
Galataport	2021	Karaköy (Galata)	Beyoğlu	400,000*	BE					Cruise ship terminal 29,000 m^{2}; Painting and Sculpture museum 20,087 m^{2}; Istanbul Modern art museum 10,500 m^{2}; Peninsula hotel
Galleria Ataköy	1987	Ataköy	Bakırköy	77,906						
Grand Pera	2016	Hüseyinağa	Beyoğlu	20,000						DeFacto; HADO sports; Zoe Garden nightclub; cinemas
Hilltown		Aydınevler	Maltepe						MM	DeFacto; LC Waikiki; Macrocenter; Paribu Cineverse; TeknoSA; Vakko Boutique
Historia		İskenderpaşa	Fatih							LC Waikiki
İstinye Park	2007	İstinye	Sarıyer	242,000	BE	BO	V			
İSTMarina		Kordonboyu	Kartal						MM	TeknoSA
Kanyon	2006	Levent	Beşiktaş	37,500						
Mall of Istanbul	2014	İkitelli OSB	Başakşehir	656,000*; 153,963**		BO		Dec	MM	Amusement Area; Cinetech Cinemas; Debenham's, DeFacto, Brooks Brothers, H&M, Beymen, Koton, LC Waikiki, Marks & Spencer, 5M Migros, Özdilek, TeknoSA, Vakko Boutique; Hilton Hotel; MOİ Sahne Theater (700 seats)
Maltepe Park	2005	Cevizli	Maltepe	71,000		BO				
Maltepe Piazza		Cevizli	Maltepe						MM	DeFacto; LC Waikiki
Marmara Forum		Osmaniye	Bakırköy	135,000		BO		Dec		
Marmara Park	2012	Beylikdüzü	Esenyurt	100,000						
MetroCity	2003	Levent	Beşiktaş	52,000						
Metropol Istanbul		Ertuğrul	Ataşehir	104,146	BE	BO		Dec	MM	Hupalupa amusements 8,960 m^{2}; Boyner 6,600 m^{2}; Cinematica 5,297 m^{2}; John Reed Fitness 4,385 m^{2}; Das Das theater 3,843 m^{2}; Carrefour SA 3,273 m^{2}; LC Waikiki 2,455 m^{2}; Media Markt 2,335 m^{2}; Beymen 1,865 m^{2}; FDR amusement center 1,741^{2}; Evidea homewares 1,448 m^{2}; Marks & Spencer 1,323 m^{2}; Paşabahçe 1,055 m^{2}
Metrogarden		Necip Fazil	Ümraniye						MM	Paribu Cineverse
Meydan İstanbul		Fatih Sultan Mehmet	Ümraniye					Dec	MM	IKEA
Nevçarşı		Mimar Sinan	Üsküdar						MM	Cinesi multicinemas; Flo shoe superstore; LC Waikiki; Migros supermarket
Olivium Outlet Center	2000	Beştelsiz	Zeytinburnu	29,211						
Optimum		Yeni Sahra	Ataşehir						MM	Boyner Outlet; Marks & Spencer
ÖzdilekPark		Esentepe	Şişli					Dec	MM	
Palladium		Barbaros	Ataşehir							LC Waikiki home, kids, men; Marks & Spencer; Paşabahçe; Sinema Tiyatro cinema
Pelican Mall		Üniversite	Avcılar							LC Waikiki
Perlavista		Adnan Kahveci	Beylikdüzü	38,000						3M Migros hypermarket; Cinemapink; Powerbowling
Piyalepaşa Çarşı		İstiklal	Beyoğlu							
Profilo	1998	Mecidiyeköy	Şişli	15,963						CINEMApink cinemas
Starcity Outlet		Yenibosna Merkez	Bahçelievler							LC Waikiki
Tepe Nautilus	2002	Acıbadem	Kadıköy	154,332				Dec		
Torium		Turgut Özal	Esenyurt	90,000				Dec		
Trump		Mecidiyeköy	Şişli						MM	DeFacto; FLO; LC Waikiki
Vadistanbul		Ayazağa	Sarıyer	162,000*; 22,000**	BE	BO	V	Dec		Note: Complex incl. 804 houses, 120,000 m^{2} offices, 20,000 m^{2} residences, 22,000 m^{2} stores
Vega		Yunus Emre	Sultangazi						MM	
Venezia Mega Outlet		Küçükköy	Gaziosmanpaşa	110,000						CarrefourSA; Covered market; Galaxia game park; LC Waikiki; Venezia Cinens cinemas; Taç & Pierre Cardin Home; Tekzen
Vialand		Yeşilpınar	Eyüpsultan					Dec		
Watergarden		Barbaros	Ataşehir							LC Waikiki
Viaport Asia Outlet		Yenişehir	Pendik							LC Waikiki
Zorlu Center	2013	Levazım	Beşiktaş	615,882*	BE		V			

*total of mixed-use development including non-retail, **shopping center only (may include some non-retail)

== Gallery ==
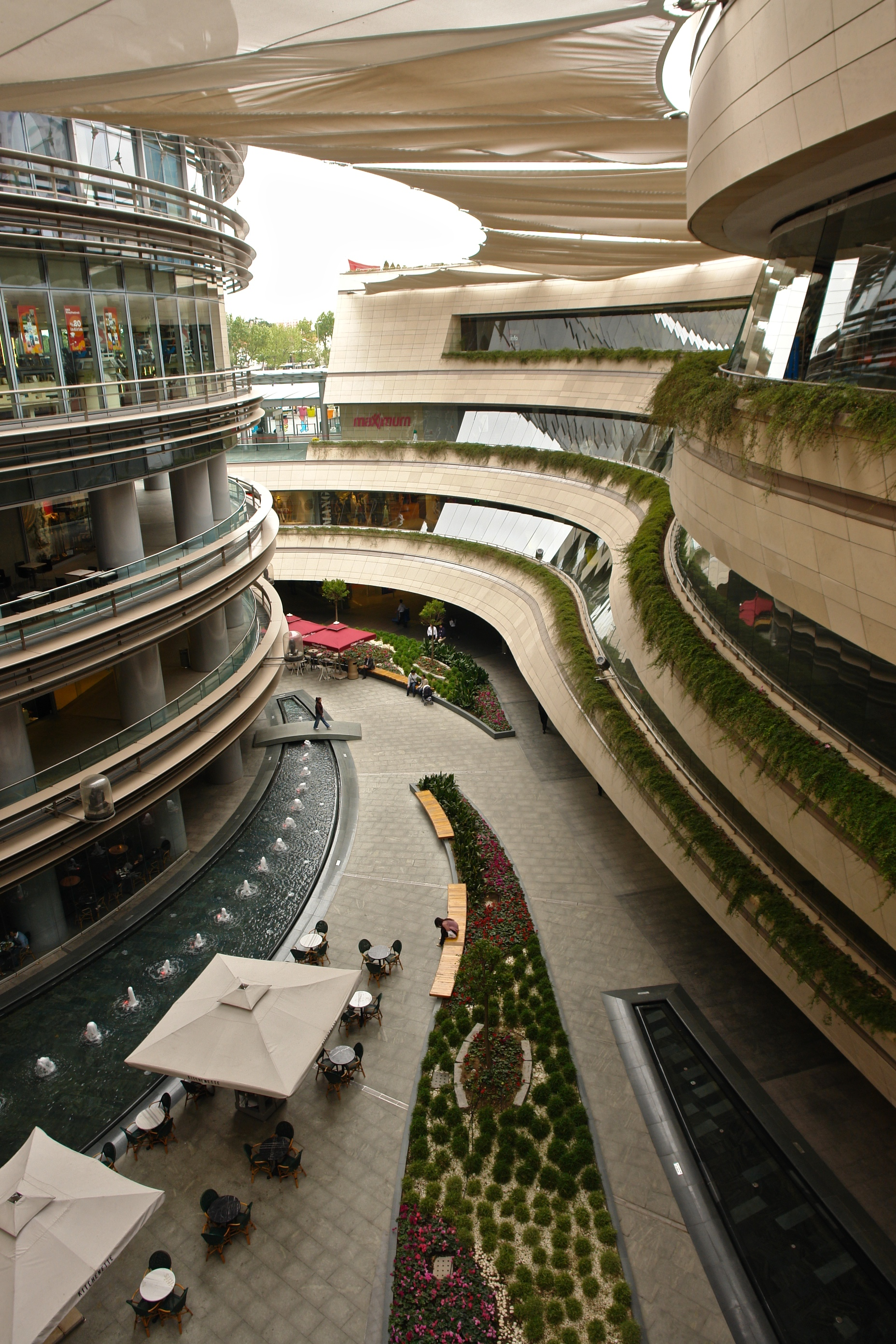
Kanyon Shopping Center

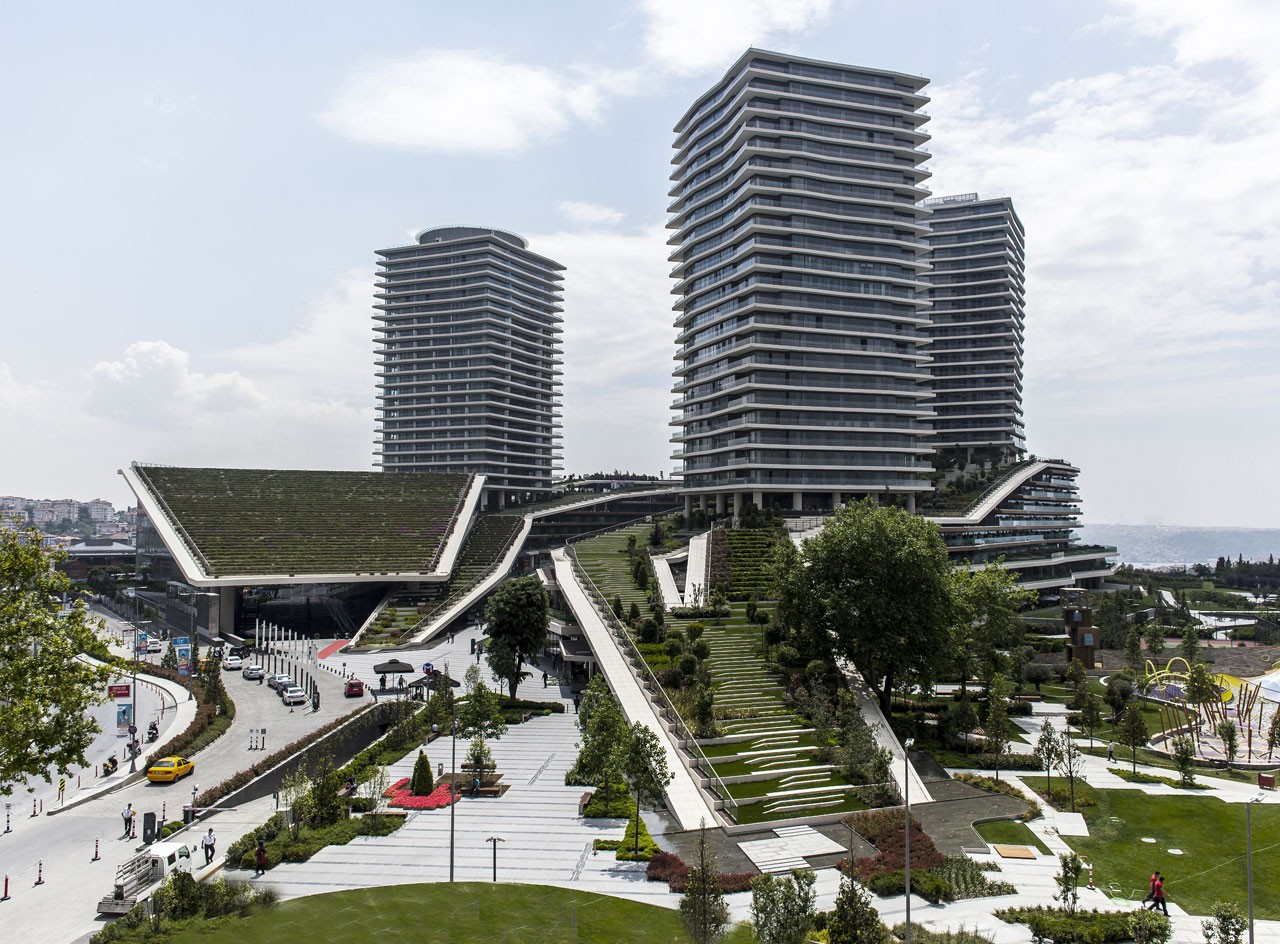
Zorlu Center

== See also ==
- List of shopping malls in Turkey
- Istanbul Shopping Fest
