= Remzi Gür =

Turkish businessman (born 1949)

- Born: October 1949 (age 76); Kastamonu, Turkey
- Occupation: Businessman
- Children: Ömer Gür

Remzi Gür (born October 1949) is a Turkish businessman, founder and owner of the Ramsey clothing manufacturing and retail company, and "a close friend and financial sponsor of Turkish Prime Minister Recep Tayyip Erdoğan".

== Early life ==
Remzi Gür was born in October 1949 in Kastamonu, Turkey.

== Career ==
With his Ramsey brand, Gür built a clothing manufacturing and retail business which he founded in London in the 1970s, and which has factories in Turkey and shops from Dublin to Almaty.

In 2013, Gür went into partnership with the Azerbaijani state oil company, Socar, to establish three companies in Turkey.

Gür is also chairman of Gürmen.

Gür is the chairman of the Turkish-British Chamber of Commerce and Industry.

== Political activity ==
In 2008, the Financial Times noted his decade-long "close friendship" with Turkey's leader, Recep Tayyip Erdogan. In May 2008, Gür received a ten year prison sentence for trying to bribe an opposition politician, which he denies. Gür paid for the higher education of all four of Recep Tayyip Erdogan's children. In 2013, Hürriyet called him "a close friend and financial sponsor of Turkish Prime Minister Recep Tayyip Erdoğan".

== Personal life ==
His son Ömer Gür is married to Didem Yurter, sister-in-law of Ali Babacan, Deputy Prime Minister of Turkey from 2009 to 2015.
