= Altunizade Mosque =

Mosque in Istanbul, Turkey

Altunizade Öosque İsmail Zühtü Pasha Mosque
- Altunizade Camii; İsmail Zühtü Paşa Camii
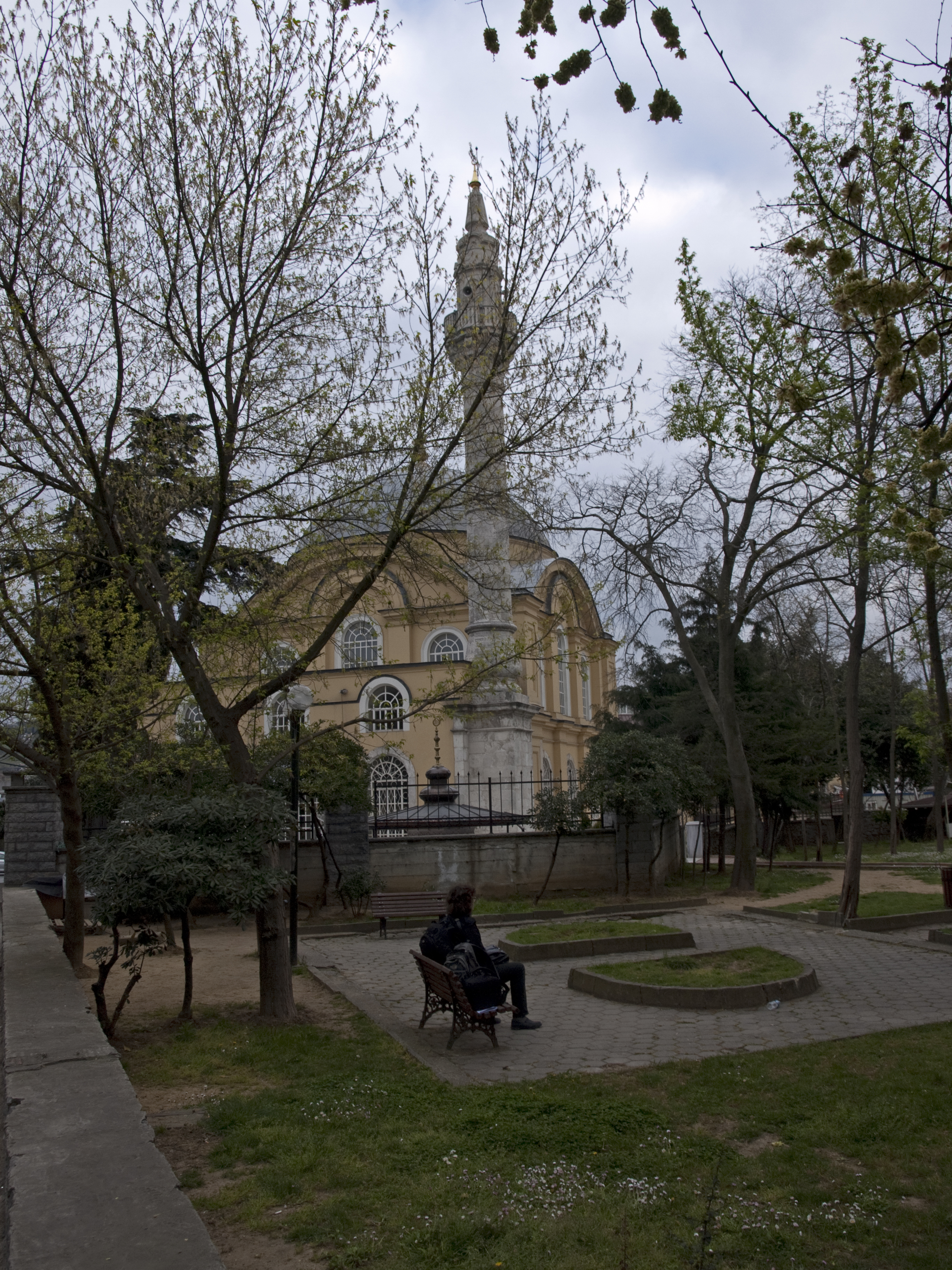

- Location of Altunizade Mosque in Istanbul

Religion
- Affiliation: Islam
- District: Üsküdar
- Province: Istanbul

Location
- Location: Altunizade, Üsküdar, Istanbul, Turkey
- Country: Turkey
- Coordinates: 41°01′13″N 29°02′44″E

Architecture
- Type: Mosque
- Style: Islamic, Ottoman architecture Empire Period (1808–1876)
- Completed: 1865; 161 years ago

Specifications
- Minaret: 1
- Materials: Limestone ashlar

Altunizade Mosque (Turkish: Altunizade Camii), also known as İsmail Zühtü Pasha Mosque (Turkish: İsmail Zühtü Paşa Camii) is a 19th-century Ottoman mosque located in Istanbul, Turkey.

The mosque is situated in the Altunizade neighborhood of Üsküdar district in Istanbul. It was commissioned by Altunizade İsmail Zühtü Pasha (1806–1887), who is buried in a protected place in the mosque's yard. The mosque was built in 1865. It is probably the last example of Ottoman architecture mosques in the Anatolian part of Istanbul. Initially, the mosque was part of a social complex (Turkish: külliye) consisting of an infant school, a hamam (bathhouse), a time-keeping office for prayer, a fountain, lodgings for the imam, the worship leader, and the muezzin, the caller of prayer, a bakery and some shops. However, only some shops of the social complex of the mosque are preserved. The mosque is today in a very good state.

The mosque was designed in Baroque Revival architecture, which can be identified at least by its large windows. Mosques built of this style are examples of the last Ottoman Empire era. It is situated in a small courtyard, which has three gates. An inscription is found above the biggest gate. Another inscription is attached to the outside of the wall facing Kaaba in Mecca. The narthex was constructed as a covered place. Three doors in the narthex, one big and two small ones, lead to the sanctuary. An ornamented small mihrab, a niche, is built in the wall of the narthex for prayer during the mosque's closed time. Two wooden staircases flanking the narthex lead to women's and muezzin section. The quadratic-plan mosque was constructed in limestone ashlar. Its inside is plastered. The sanctuary's walls are ornamented with hand-carved figures. The mosque has one dome, which is supported by four arches carried by four columns in the mosque's corners. The dome's inner surface is sliced in 16 zones by eight pieces of two designs. The center of the dome is blue colored to draw attention, and contains a Quran verse. The marble minbar is designed in the form of a drinking glass as seen in Hırka-i Şerif Mosque. The windows are unusual big as an example of the Baroque Revival architectural style. The mosque has one minaret with one balcony. It rises up on a quadratic base. The minaret's spire is made of stone in contrast to the lead sheet covered spires seen in the classical Ottoman mosque architecture. The spire is designed in the form of a grand vizier's turban. A decorative line of stars is found in the mid of the minaret. In the lower row, there are three big windows at the side walls and two big ones flank the wall of mihrab. In the upper row, there are again three windows on each side, however, two small windows flank the big one in the middle.

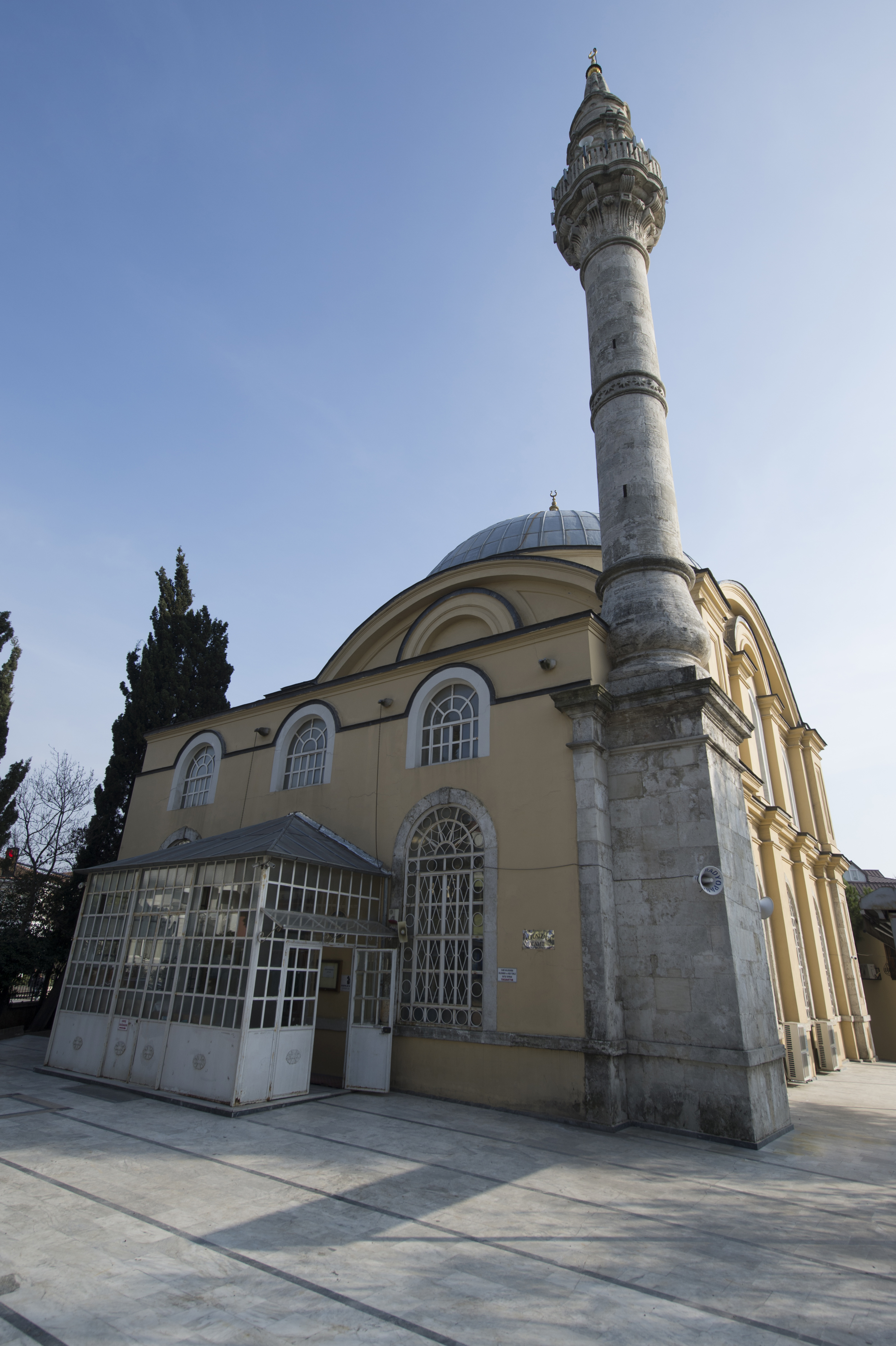
Altunizade Mosque exterior

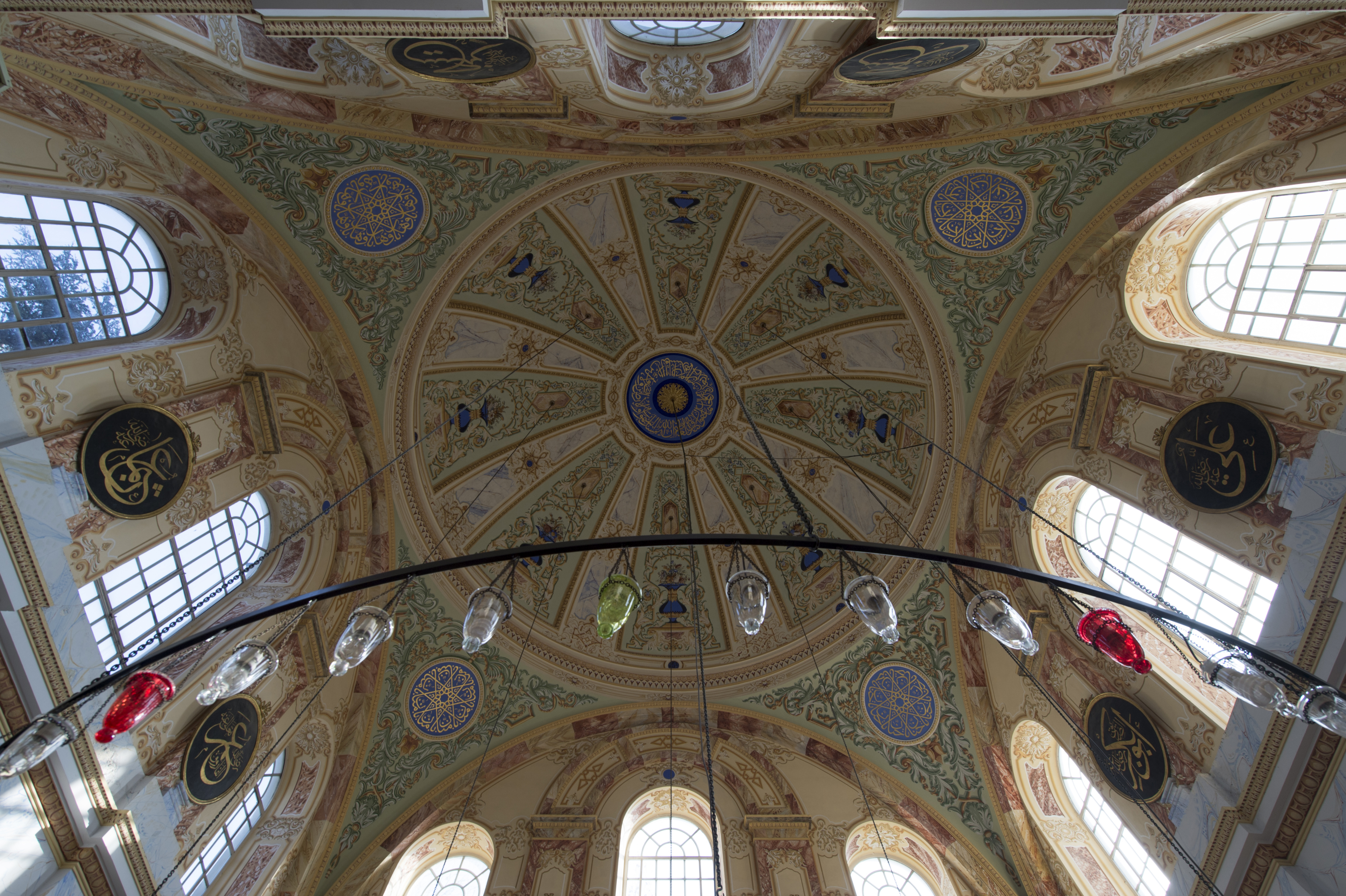
Altunizade Mosque ceiling

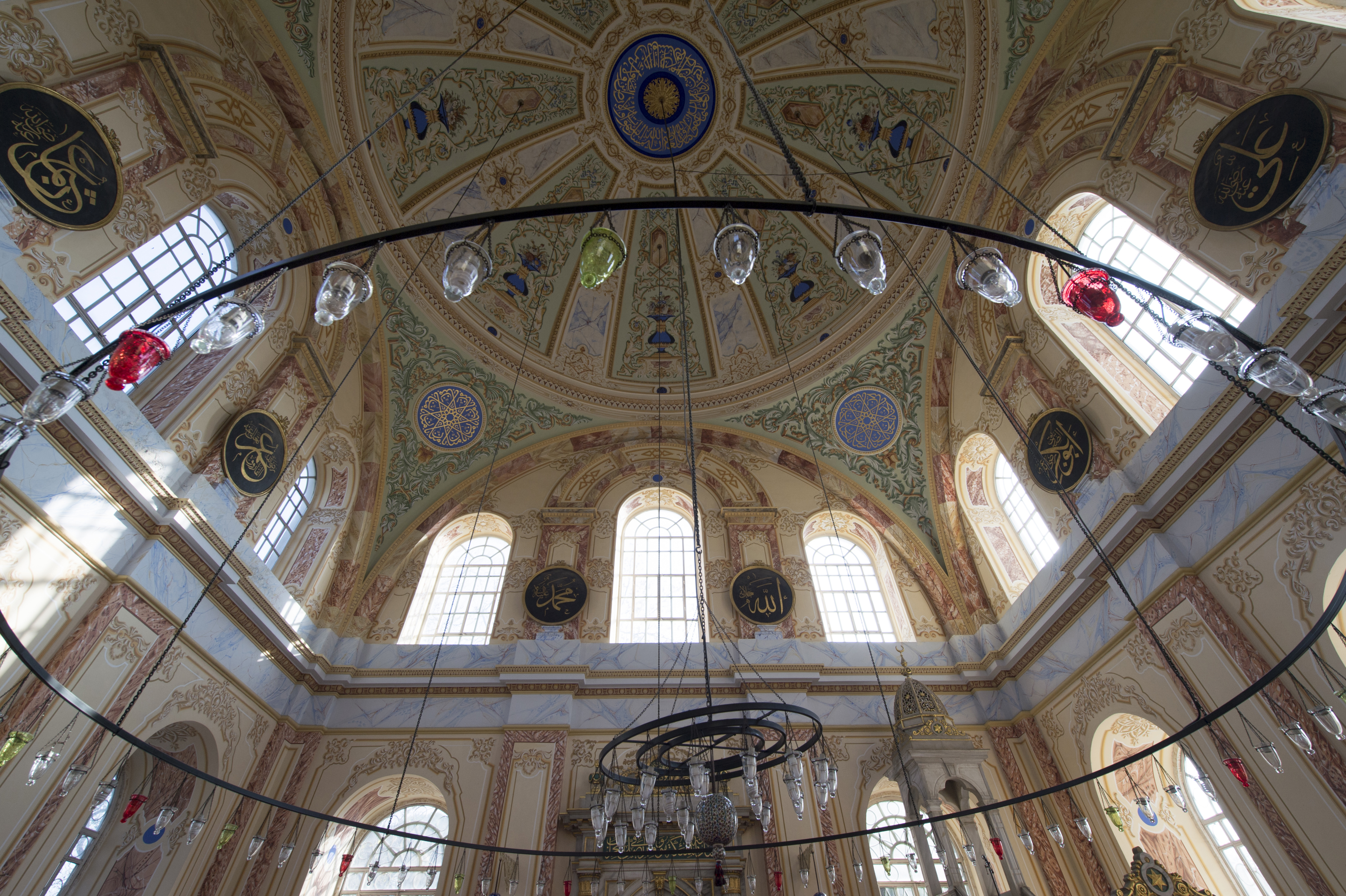
Altunizade Mosque ceiling

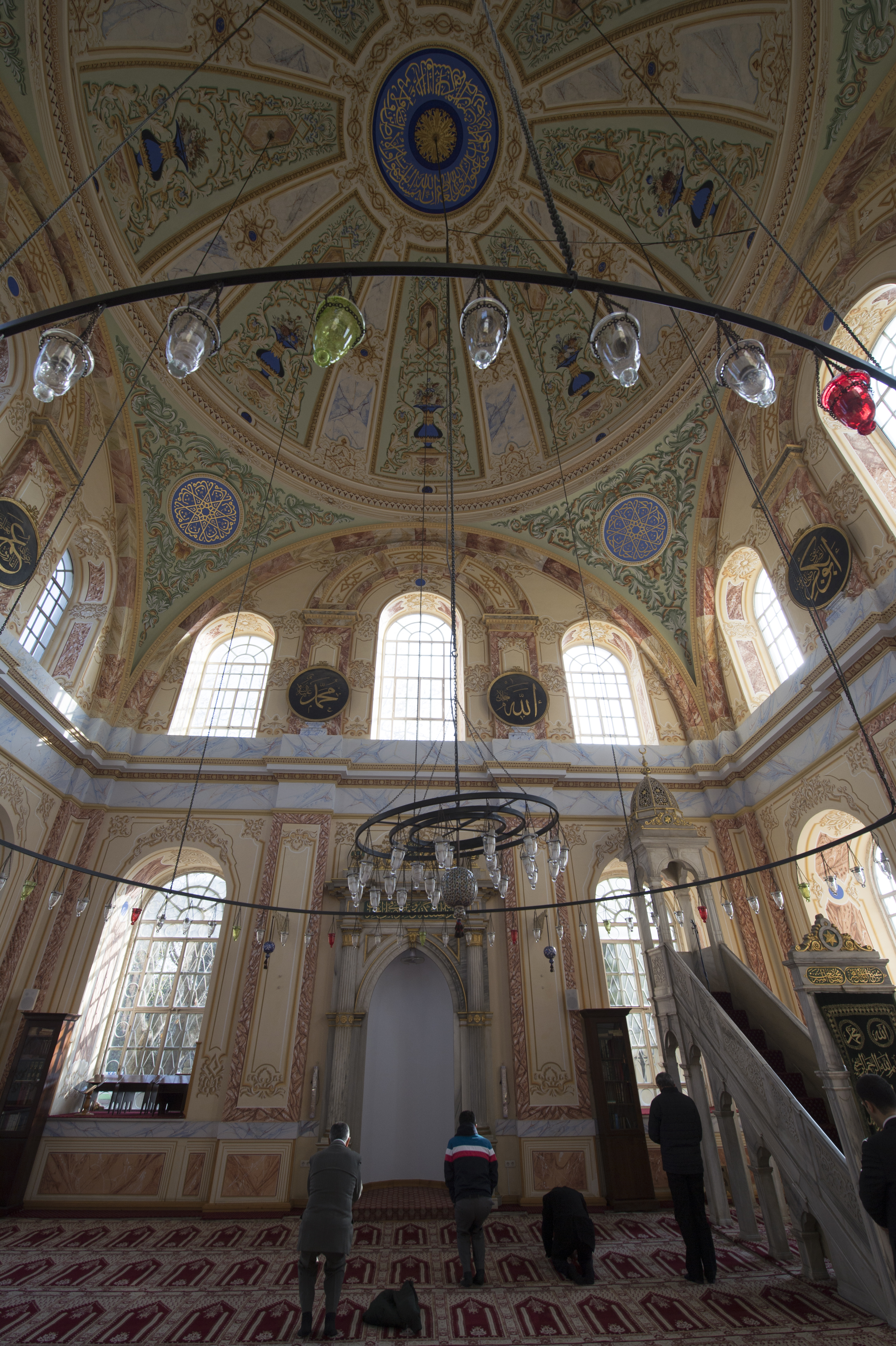
Altunizade Mosque minber and mihrab

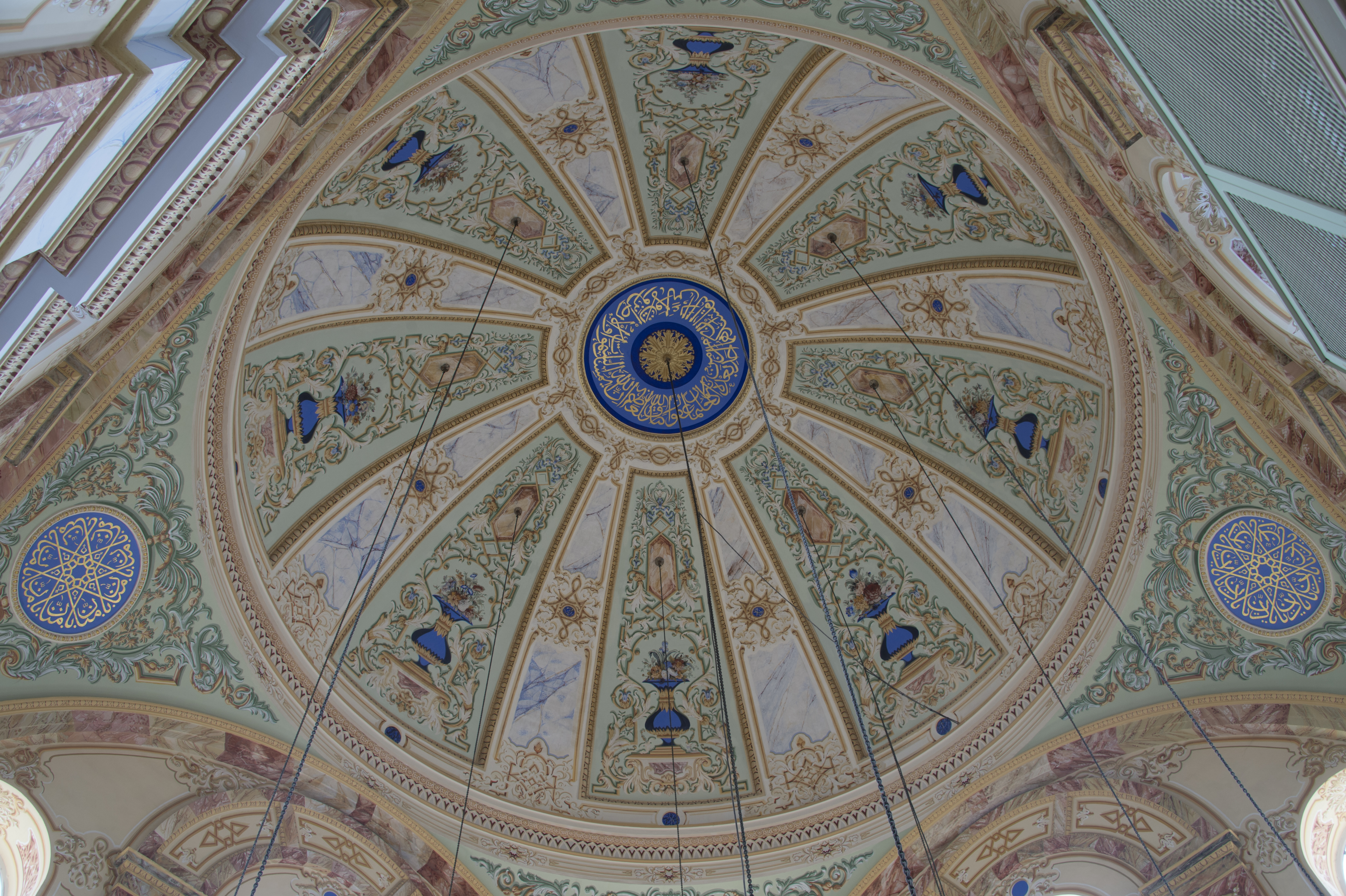
Altunizade Mosque dome inside
