= Istanbul Cevahir =

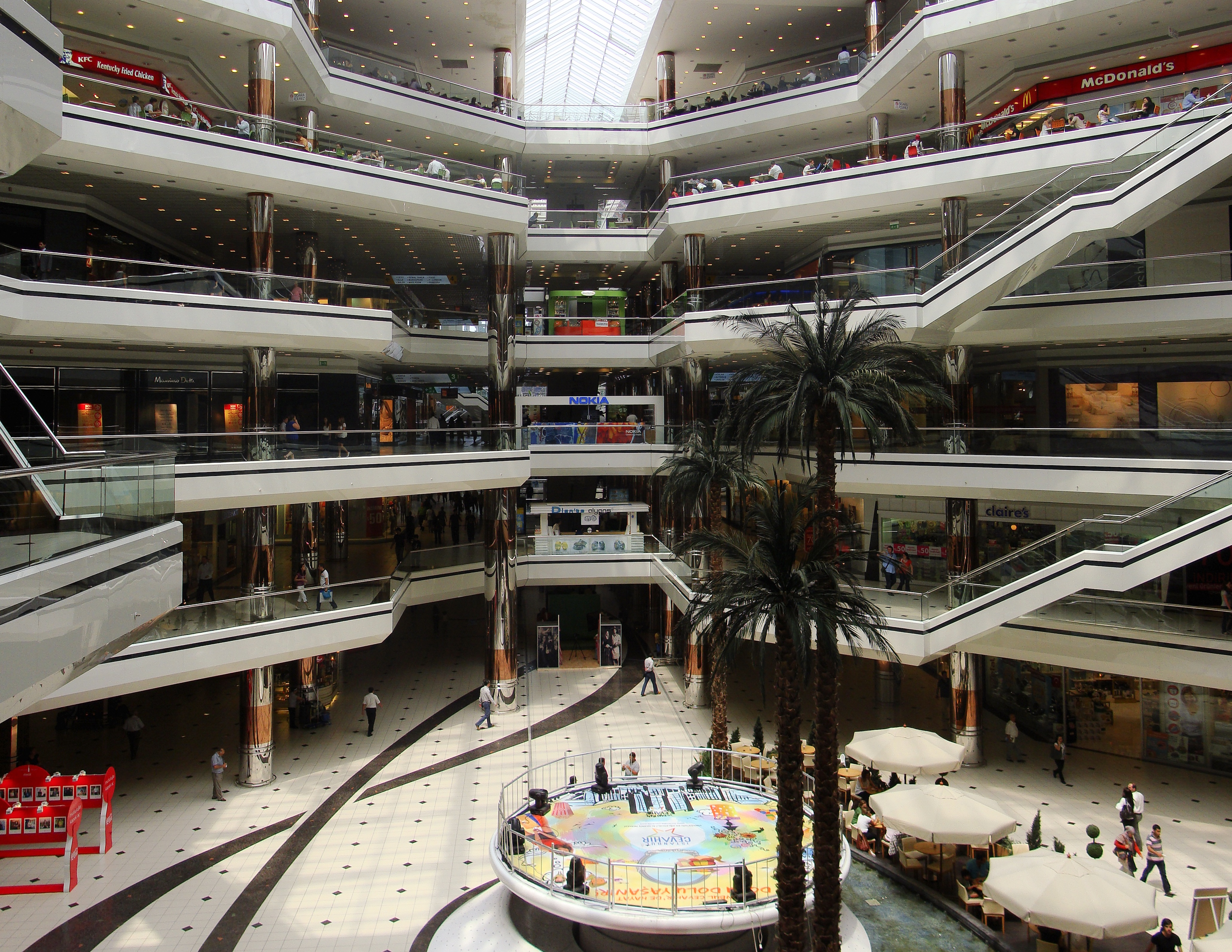
- Interior of the Cevahir Shopping Mall
- Location: Istanbul, Turkey
- Coordinates: 41°03′46″N 28°59′35″E
- Address: Büyükdere Cad. No. 22 Şişli, Istanbul
- Opened: 15 October 2005; 21 years ago
- Developer: Cevahirler Group
- Manager: Pradera Limited
- Owner: St Martins Property Group Nurettin Kurt
- Architect: Minori Yamasaki, Can Yavuzarslan
- Num. of stores: 343 shops 48 restaurants 12 cinemas 1 show stage 1 bowling hall 1 roller coaster
- Floor area: 420,000 m^{2} (4,521,000 sq ft) total floor area; 110,000 m^{2} (1,184,000 sq ft) rentable retail area.
- Floors: 6
- Parking: 2,500 vehicles
- Website: istanbulcevahir.com

The Istanbul Cevahir Shopping and Entertainment Centre (Turkish: İstanbul Cevahir Alışveriş Merkezi), also known as the Şişli Culture and Trade Centre (Şişli Kültür ve Ticaret Merkezi), is a modern shopping mall located on the Büyükdere Avenue in the Şişli district of Istanbul, Turkey. Opened on 15 October 2005, Istanbul Cevahir was the largest shopping mall in Europe in terms of gross leasable area between 2005 and 2011, and is one of the largest in the world.

== History ==
The architectural design was begun by Minori Yamasaki, who died in 1986, and carried on by Turkish British architect Can Yavuzarslan.

Istanbul Cevahir was built on a 62,475 m^{2} (672,000 sq ft) land plot at a cost of US$250 million.

== Facilities ==
The complex has a total floor area of 420,000 m^{2} (4,521,000 sq ft) and a gross leasable area of 110,000 m^{2} (1,184,000 sq ft) for shops and restaurants.

The six retail floors of the shopping centre house 343 shops (some of which are the first in Turkey to sell certain international brands); 34 fast food restaurants and 14 full-service restaurants.

Other facilities include a large stage for shows and other events, the eleven-screen Paribu Cineverse Cevahir multicinema with c.2,400 seats, a bowling alley, a small roller coaster and several other entertainment facilities.

The building's 2,500 m^{2} (26,910 sq ft) glass roof carries the second biggest clock in the world, with three-metre (10-foot) high digits.

The four-story, 71,000-square-metre (764,000-square-foot) car park has space for 2,500 cars.

=== Tenants ===
As of late 2024, tenants included:

- Major department stores Boyner, Özdilek, and Vakko Boutique
- Jumbo hypermarket, Migros
- Sports megastore Decathlon
- Turkish fashion brands incl. Altınyıldız Classics, Beymen Business, Colins, DeFacto, İpekyol, Mavi, Ramsey, and Tudors
- Spanish fashion brands incl. Bershka, Mango, Massimo Dutti, Pull&Bear, Zara, and Zara Home
- International brands incl. Adidas, Aldo, Benetton, Beverly Hills Polo Club, Birkenstock, The Body Shop, Bosch, Calzedonia, Columbia Sportswear, The Gap, Intimissimi, Jack & Jones, Marks & Spencer, Oleg Cassini, Oysho, Puma, Reebok, Rossmann, Samsonite, Samsung, Sephora, Siemens, Skechers, Stradivarius, Swarovski, Tefal, Tommy Hilfiger, U.S. Polo Assn., Victoria’s Secret, Watsons, and Yves Rocher.

Debenhams opened two stores in Istanbul, one in the Mall of Istanbul in 2014 and in Istanbul Cevahir. Both closed in 2017.

== Exhibitions ==
- Body Worlds: Animal Inside Out

== Gallery ==
Interior panorama of Istanbul Cevahir

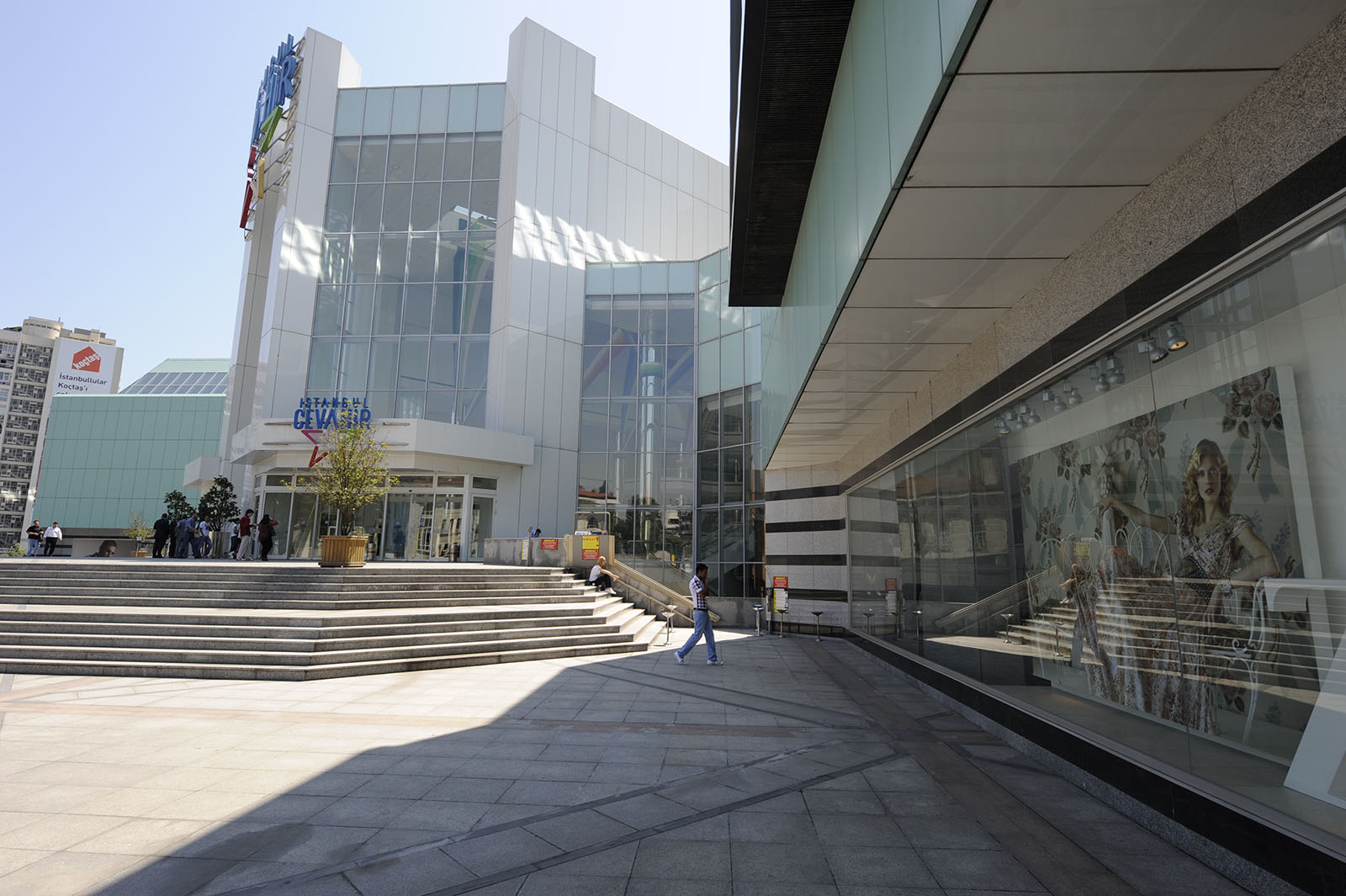
Cevahir mall exterior

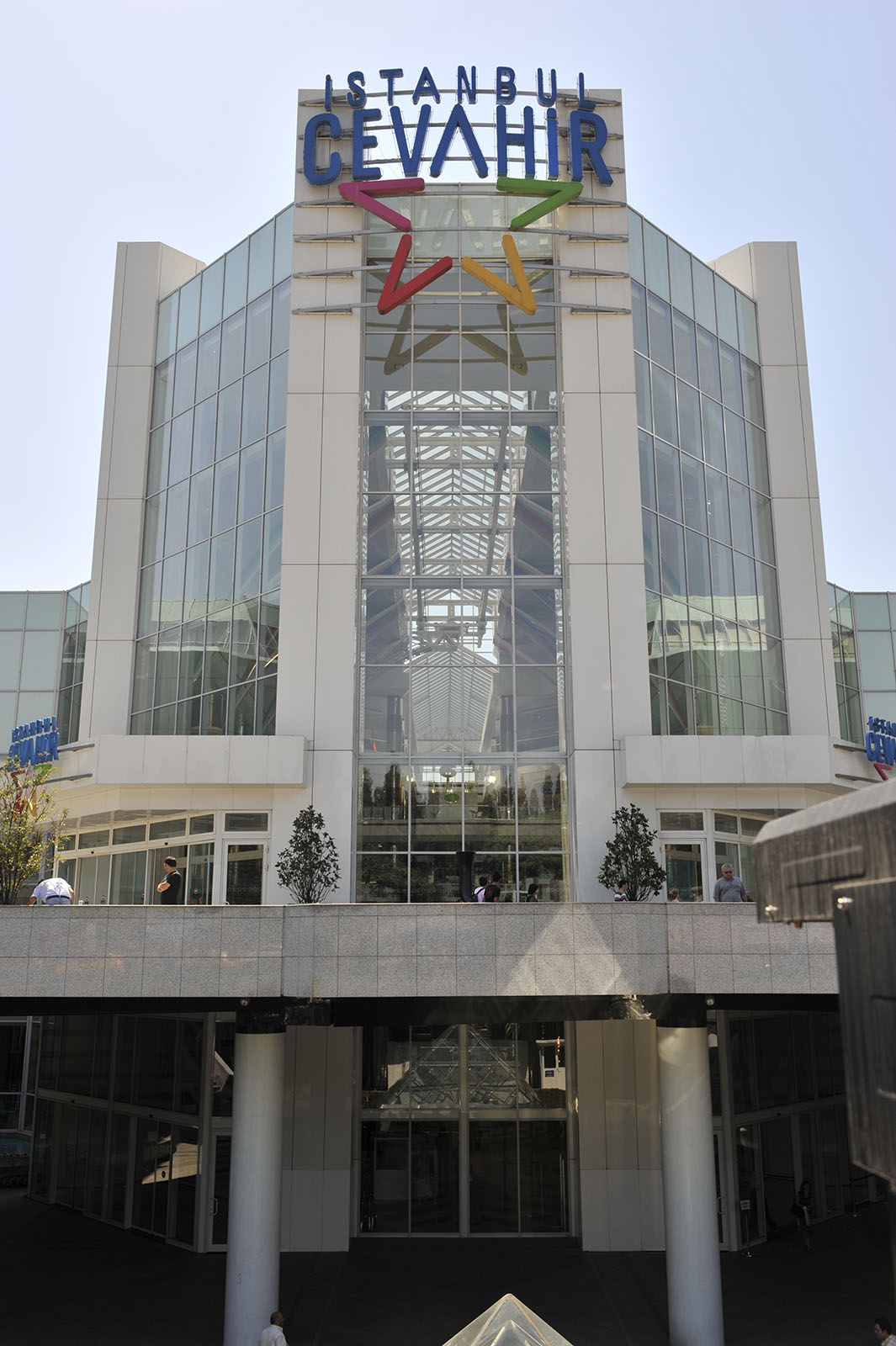
Cevahir mall exterior

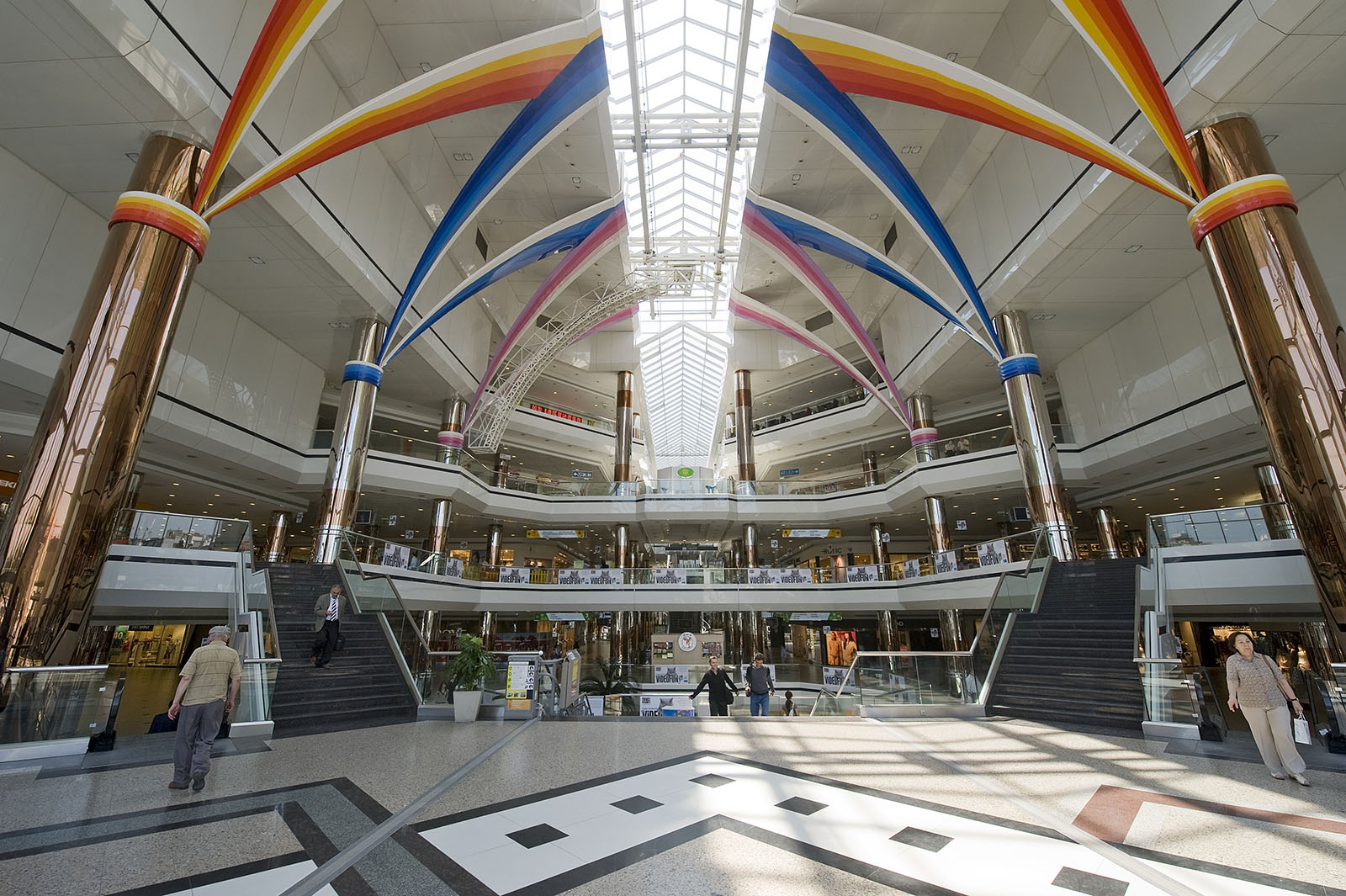
Cevahir mall interior

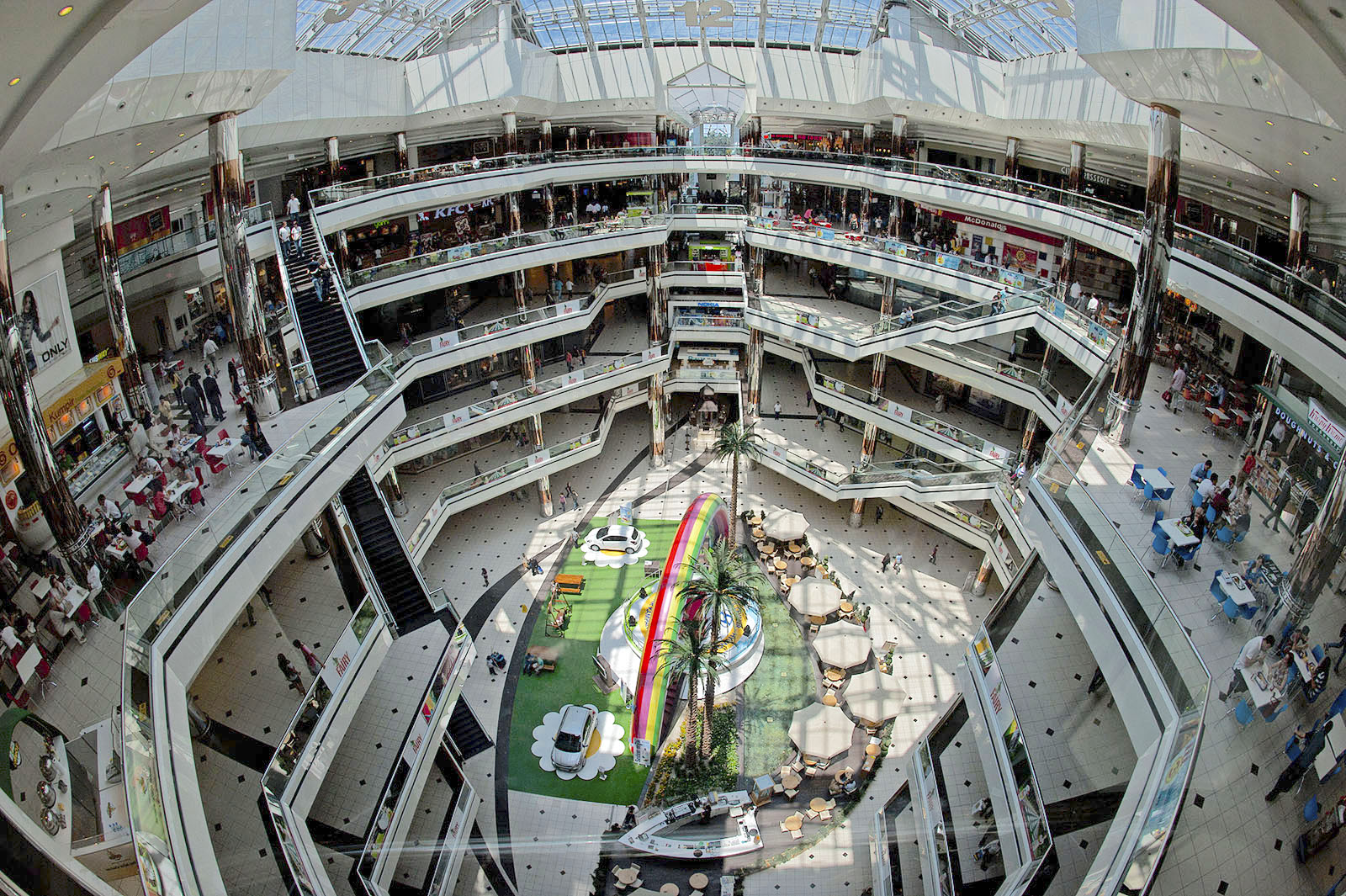
Cevahir mall interior

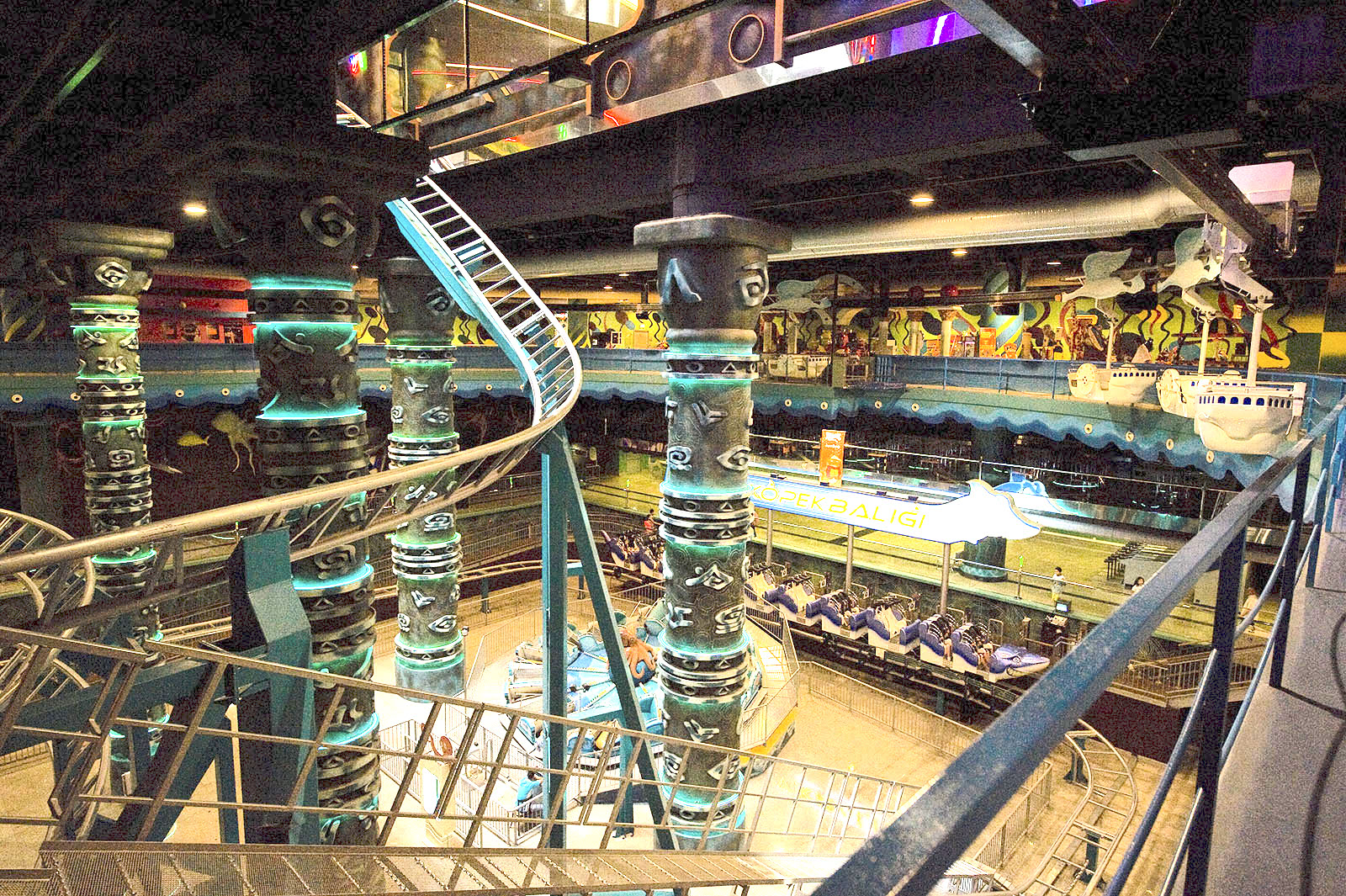
Cevahir mall playground

== See also ==
- List of shopping malls in Istanbul
- Some 100 pictures in gallery
