= Özdilek (disambiguation) =

Özdilek is a Turkish surname formed by the combination of the two Turkish words öz ("gist; kernel") and dilek ("desire; wish") and may refer to:

- Fahrettin Özdilek (1898–1989), Turkish military officer and politician
- Mehmet Özdilek (born 1966), Turkish football manager and retired footballer
- Özdilek Holding, a Turkish industrial, retail and entertainment conglomerate
