= Capitol Shopping Center =

Shopping mall in Istanbul, Turkey

Coordinates: 41°01′16″N 29°02′22″E

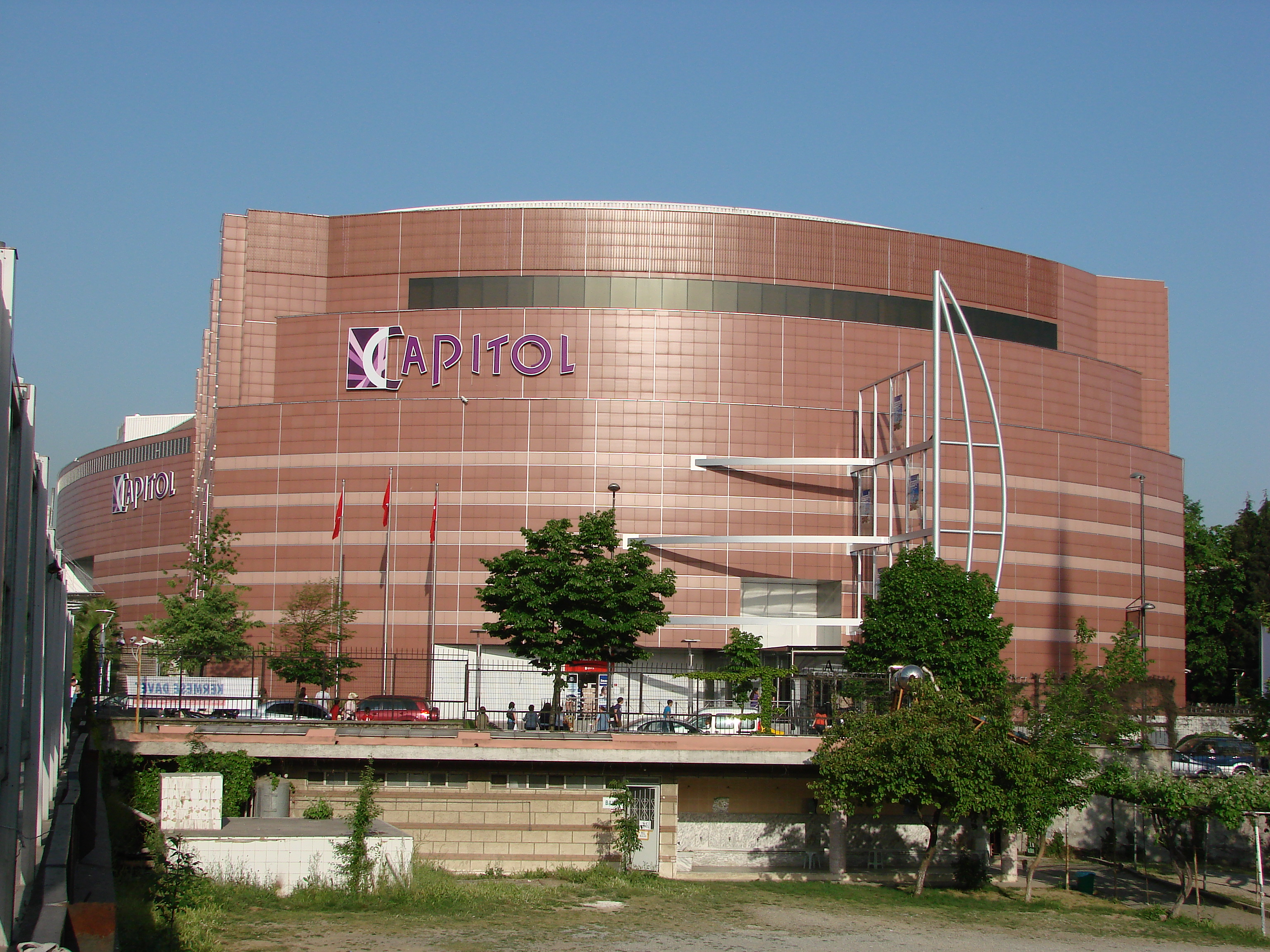
Capitol Shopping Centre
Location	Altunizade, İstanbul, Turkey
Opening date	1993
Developed by	Mesa - Türsoy
Land area (m^{2})	67,000
Total enclosed area (m^{2})	270,000
Gross leasable area (m^{2})	31,000
Market (m^{2})	Migros (2,119)
Number of stores	157
Number of FF/Rest/Cafe	24
Anchor tenants (m^{2})	Boyner (5,802); Homestore (640); Koton (514); Mango (519); Marks & Spencer (940); Mudo City (642)
Entertainment	14 movie halls (1,705 seats); Kids play ground
Parking lot capacity	1,400
Homepage	www.capitol.com.tr

Capitol Shopping Centre (Turkish: Capitol Alışveriş Merkezi), opened in 1993 in Altunizade neighbourhood of Üsküdar, is the first modern big shopping mall on the Asian part of Istanbul, Turkey.

Built on 6 floors and covering an area of 73,000 m^{2}, the shopping complex houses 157 retail stores, a department store and an MMM Migros supermarket, 8 movie theaters, fast food restaurants, cafeterias, bowling alley and entertainment center. It houses also Capitol Radio, a private radio station broadcasting from the complex. It has an open air and covered parking lot. Several cafes are located in the area around a huge central spring fountain.

Capitol Shopping Centre also has a movie theatre which has 14 different parts. It is one of the biggest and most modern movie theatres in Istanbul.

== See also ==
- List of shopping malls in Istanbul
