= Altunizade =

Neighbourhood in Istanbul, Turkey

- Neighbourhood
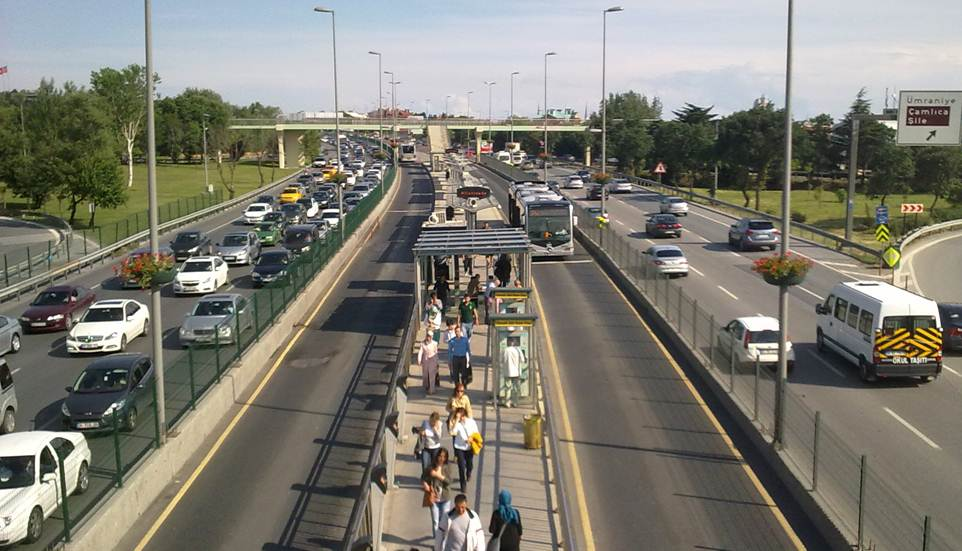
- Metrobus stop, Altunizade

- Location within Turkey Location within Istanbul
- Coordinates: 41°01′13″N 29°02′44″E
- Country: Turkey
- Province: Istanbul
- District: Üsküdar
- Population (2022): 13,459
- Time zone: UTC+3 (TRT)
- Postal code: 34662
- Area code: 0216

Altunizade is a neighbourhood in the municipality and district of Üsküdar, Istanbul Province, Turkey. Its population is 13,459 (2022). It is located on the Asian side of the city.

The location takes its name from Altunizade İsmail Zühtü Pasha (1806–1887), a wealthy civil servant in the Ottoman Empire, who established the settlement in an utmost area on the Anatolian part of Istanbul in the 19th century. "Altunizade" means gold trader in the Ottoman Turkish language.

== Education ==
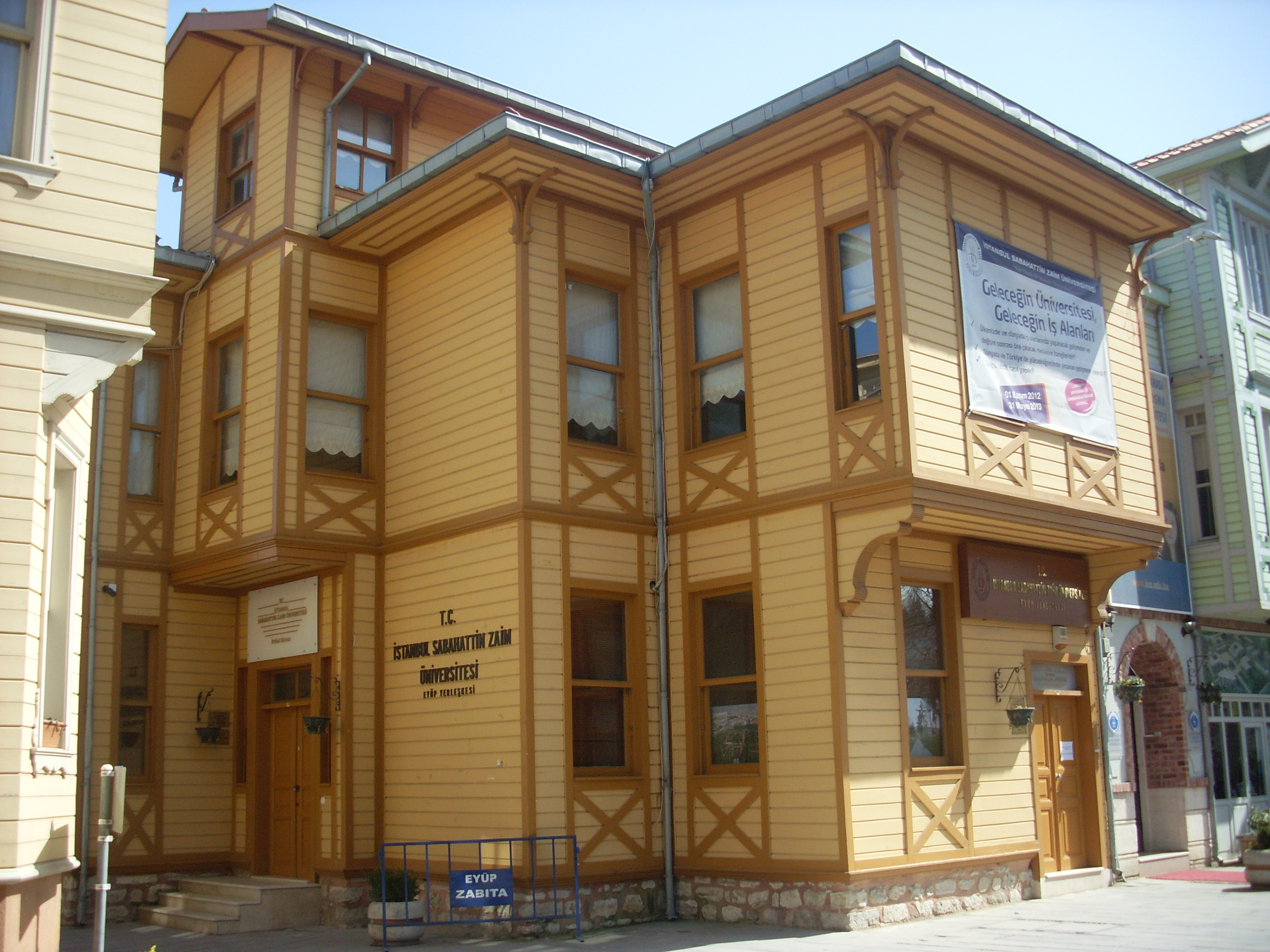
Main building of Istanbul Sabahattin Zaim University in Eyüp, Istanbul

Following universities maintain campuses in Altunizade: Istanbul 29 Mayıs University, Istanbul Şehir University, Istanbul Medeniyet University, Istanbul Sabahattin Zaim University, and Üsküdar University.

== Places of interest ==
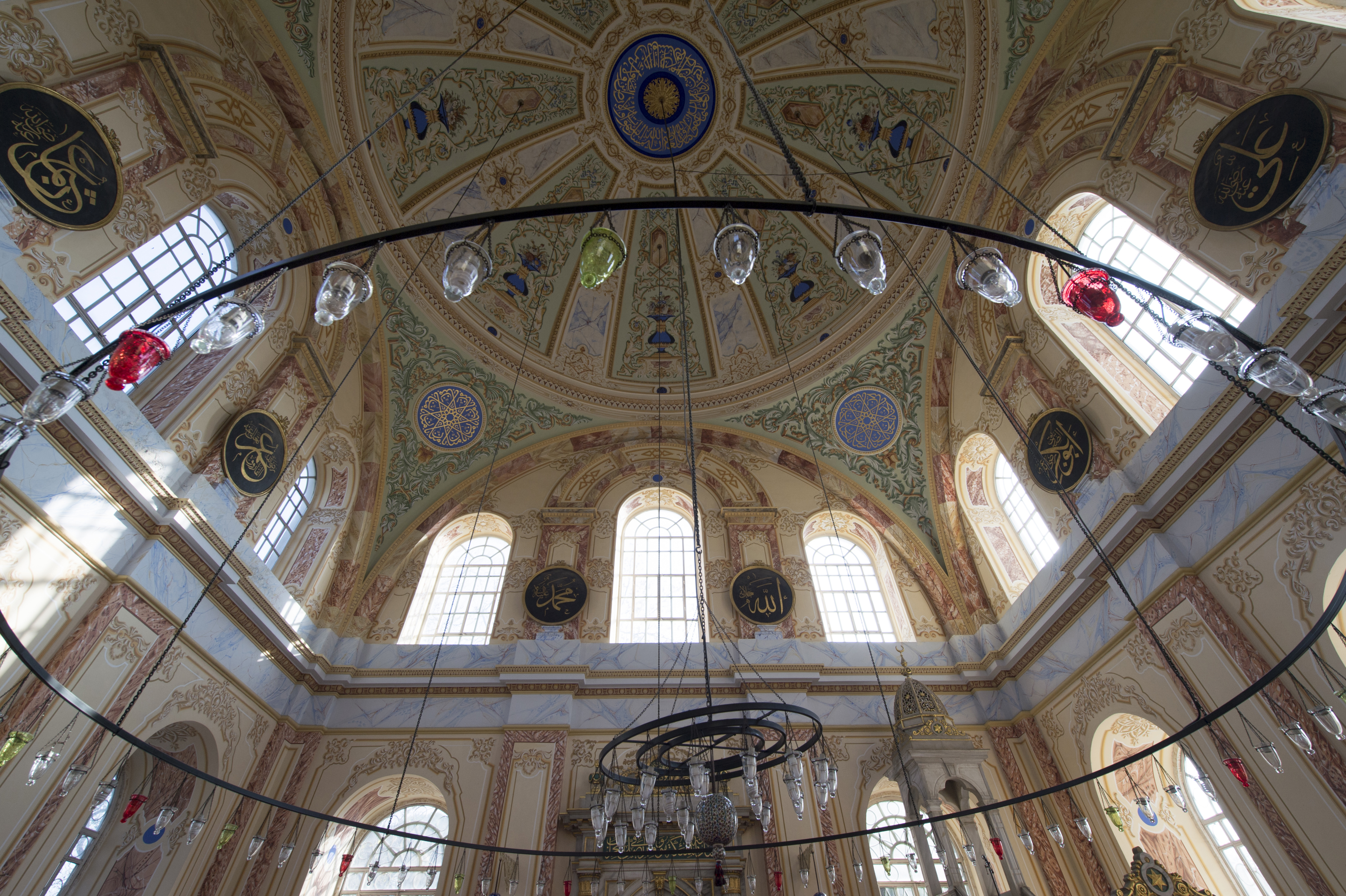
Altunizade Mosque, built in 1865.

Places of interest in the neighborhood are Altunizade Mosque, Capitol Shopping Center and Altunizade Acıbadem hastanesi

== Transport ==
The motorway Otoyol 1 runs just northeast of the neighborhood connecting the Bosphorus Bridge with Kadıköy. A number of İETT city bus lines and bus rapid transit Metrobus line serve Altunizade. Also M-5 Subway runs in Altunizade.
