= Ayrılıkçeşmesi =

- Quarter
- Location within Istanbul
- Coordinates: 40°59′50″N 29°01′50″E
- Country: Turkey
- Region: Marmara
- Province: Istanbul
- District: Kadıköy
- Neighborhood: Rasimpaşa
- Time zone: UTC+3 (TRT)
- Postal code: 34718
- Area code: 0216

Ayrılıkçeşmesi is a quarter in Kadıköy district of Istanbul, Turkey. Due to its settlement type, its borders are not well defined, however the locality lies mostly within the neighborhood of Rasimpaşa.

== Overview ==
The quarter takes its name from the fountain, which was built by an Ottoman court servant in the 16th century and restored in the 18th century. "Ayrılıkçeşmesi" means in Turkish language literally "Farewell Fountain". The fountain was named so when Sultan Murad IV (reigned 1623–40) left the capital in command of his field army for the Baghdad campaign in 1623.

In the history, it was the place on the Asian side of Istanbul, where the Ottoman Army for a campaign in the east, the Imperial regiment carrying donation and gifts to Mecca, Muslim pilgrim caravans heading for Hajj and high-ranked civil servants leaving for their appointed places gathered in the meadow before the fountain, practised a last prayer after the ritual washing at the fountain and finally departed, receiving a ceremonial farewell. Former name of the quarter was "İbrahimağa".

The Istanbul Metro's line M4 has a station in Ayrılıkçeşmesi, which was named formerly Çayırbaşı. On 29 October 2013, the 90th anniversary Republic Day, Marmaray's Bosphorus undersea crossing went in service with Ayrılıkçeşmesi station being its provisory eastern terminus.

The shopping mall Tepe Nautilus, built in 2001, is situated in Ayrılıkçeşmesi.

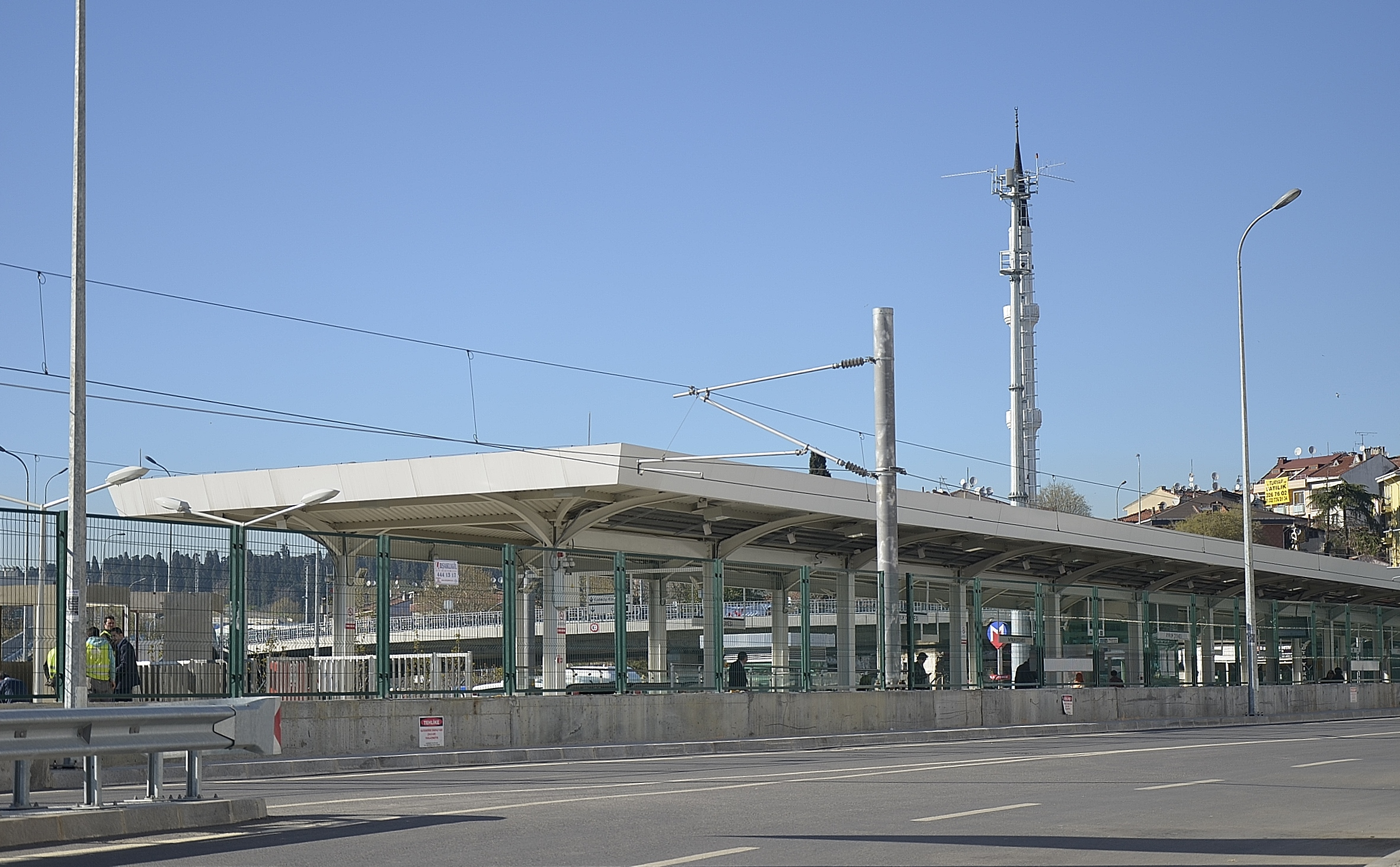
Ayrılıkçeşmesi station of Marmaray

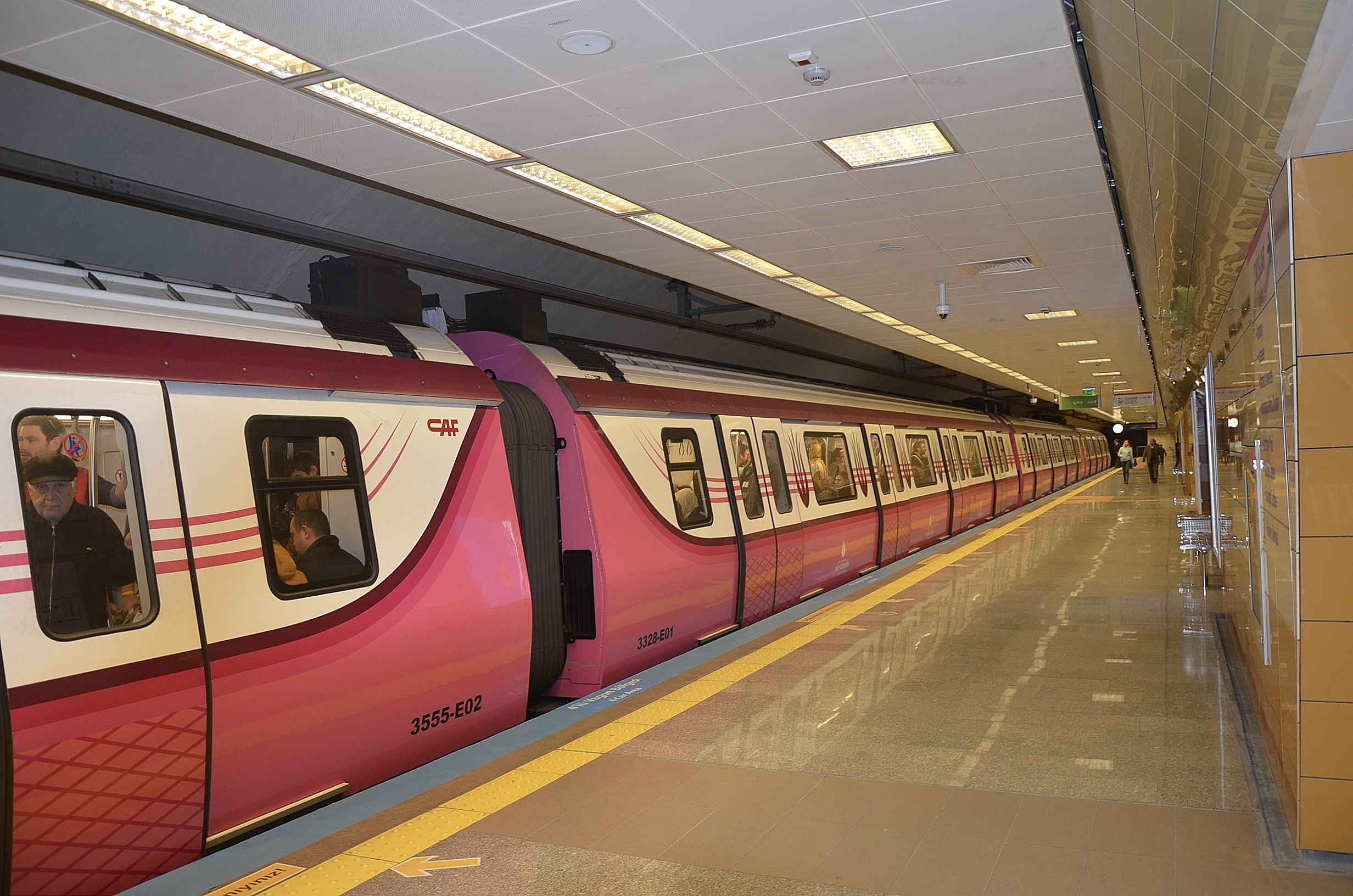
Istanbul Metro line M4 at Ayrılıkçeşmesi Station

== See also ==
- Tepe Nautilus shopping mall
- Marmaray
- M4 (Istanbul Metro)
