= Olivium Outlet Center =

Coordinates: 40°59′43″N 28°54′32″E

- Location: Zeytinburnu, Istanbul, Turkey
- Opened: April 1, 2000
- Developer: Emintaş
- Num. of stores: 118
- Num. of anchor tenants: 4
- Floor area: 29,200 square metres (314,000 sq ft)
- Parking: 1,200
- Website: www.olivium.com.tr

Olivium Outlet Center, opened on April 1, 2000, is an outlet shopping mall located in the working class district of Zeytinburnu in Istanbul, Turkey. It was established by a joint venture of the companies Emintaş and İleri Mensucat.

The shopping center, situated outside of the ancient city walls of Istanbul, initially featured 25 stores, but extended to 118 shops today. Olivium covers area of 45,000 m^{2} on 4 floors and has a parking lot with a capacity of 1,000 cars in 2 additional floors. The center offers to the visitors also a supermarket, 6 movie theaters, a theater, a bowling alley with 15 lanes, a variety of fast food restaurants and cafeterias.

== See also ==
- List of shopping malls in Istanbul
