= Tepe Nautilus =

Shopping mall in Istanbul, Turkey

Coordinates: 40°59′58″N 29°01′53″E

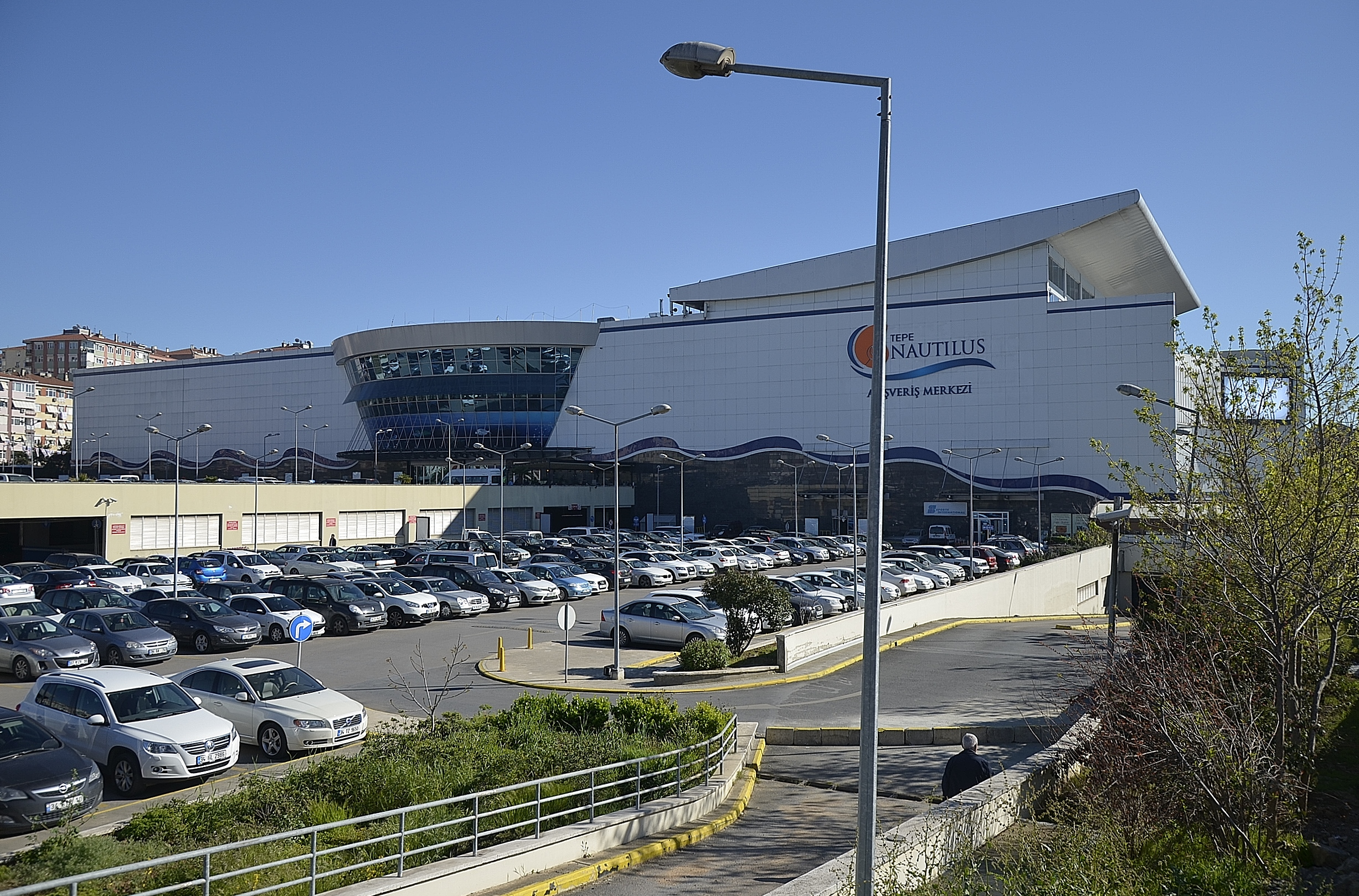
- Tepe Nautilus
- Location: Ayrılıkçeşmesi, Kadıköy, Istanbul
- Opened: September 21, 2001; 25 years ago
- Developer: Tepe Group
- Num. of stores: 113
- Floor area: 154,332 m^{2} (1,661,220 sq ft)
- Parking: 2,600

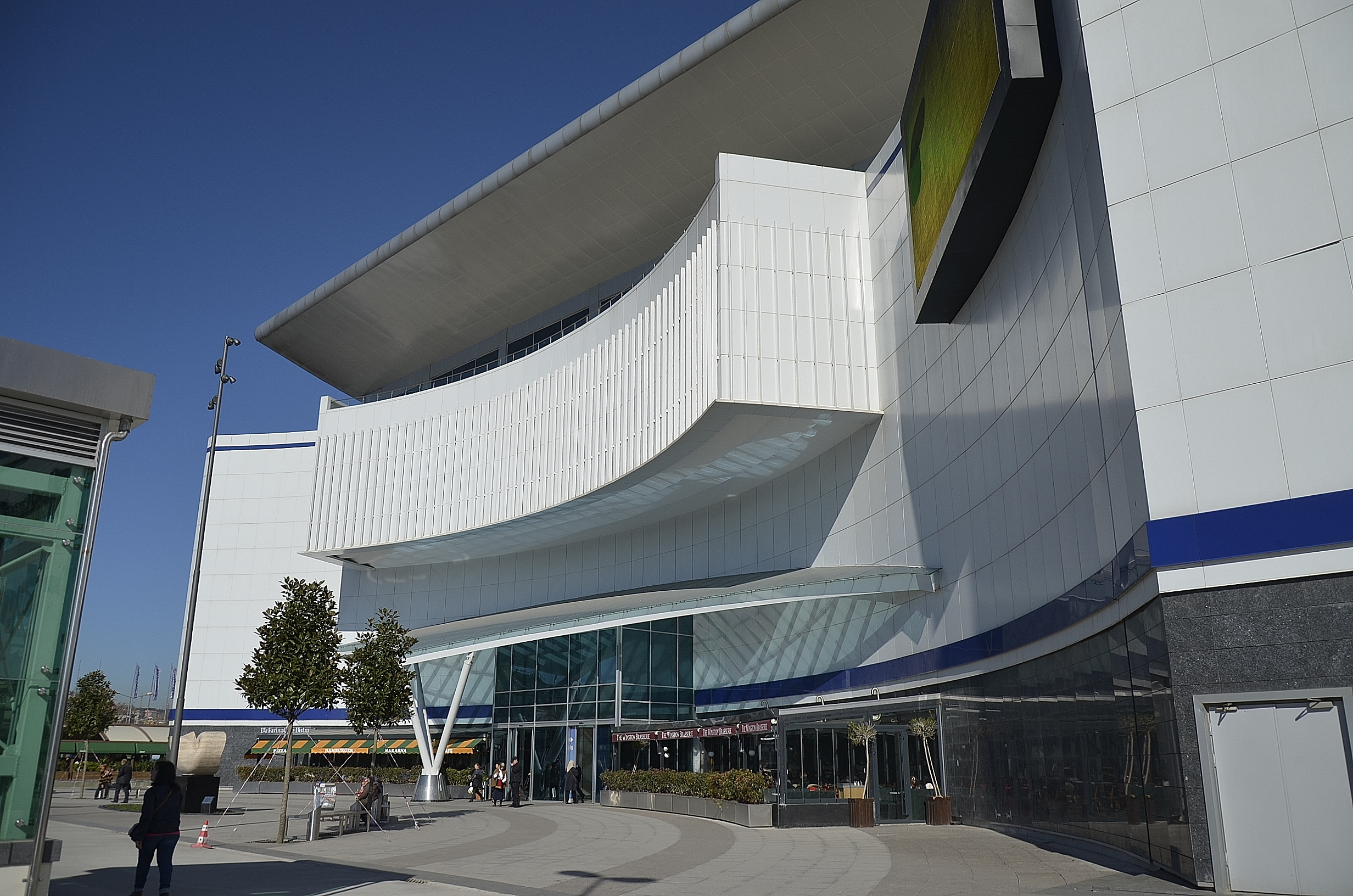
Main entrance of Tepe Nautilus

Tepe Nautilus, opened in September 2001, is a shopping mall in Turkey. Built by Tepe Group, it is situated in the Acıbadem quarter of Kadıköy district in the Asian part of Istanbul.

Tepe Nautilus is a thematic shopping mall, with its name, decoration and architectural features associated with sea and navigation. It covers an area of 170,000 m^{2} (1,800,000 sq ft). The shopping mall consists of 130 stores on three floors, a department store and Carrefour supermarket. The food court hosts 16 restaurants and cafes.

== See also ==
- List of shopping malls in Istanbul
