= CarrefourSA Maltepe Park =

Shopping mall in Istanbul, Turkey

Coordinates: 40°55′10″N 29°09′49″E

Location	Maltepe, İstanbul, Turkey
Opening date	February 12, 2005; 20 years ago
Developed by	Carrefour - Sabancı
Land area (m²)	40,260
Total enclosed area (m²)	46,500
Gross leasable area (m²)	75,000
Market (m²)	Carrefour (10,500)
Number of stores and FF/Rest/Cafe	250
Anchor tenants (m²)	Mudo City (958); Koton (606); LCW (711); TeknoSA (572); Flo (652)
Entertainment	8 movie halls (2,218 seats)
Parking lot capacity	3,500
Homepage	www.maltepeparkavm.com/en

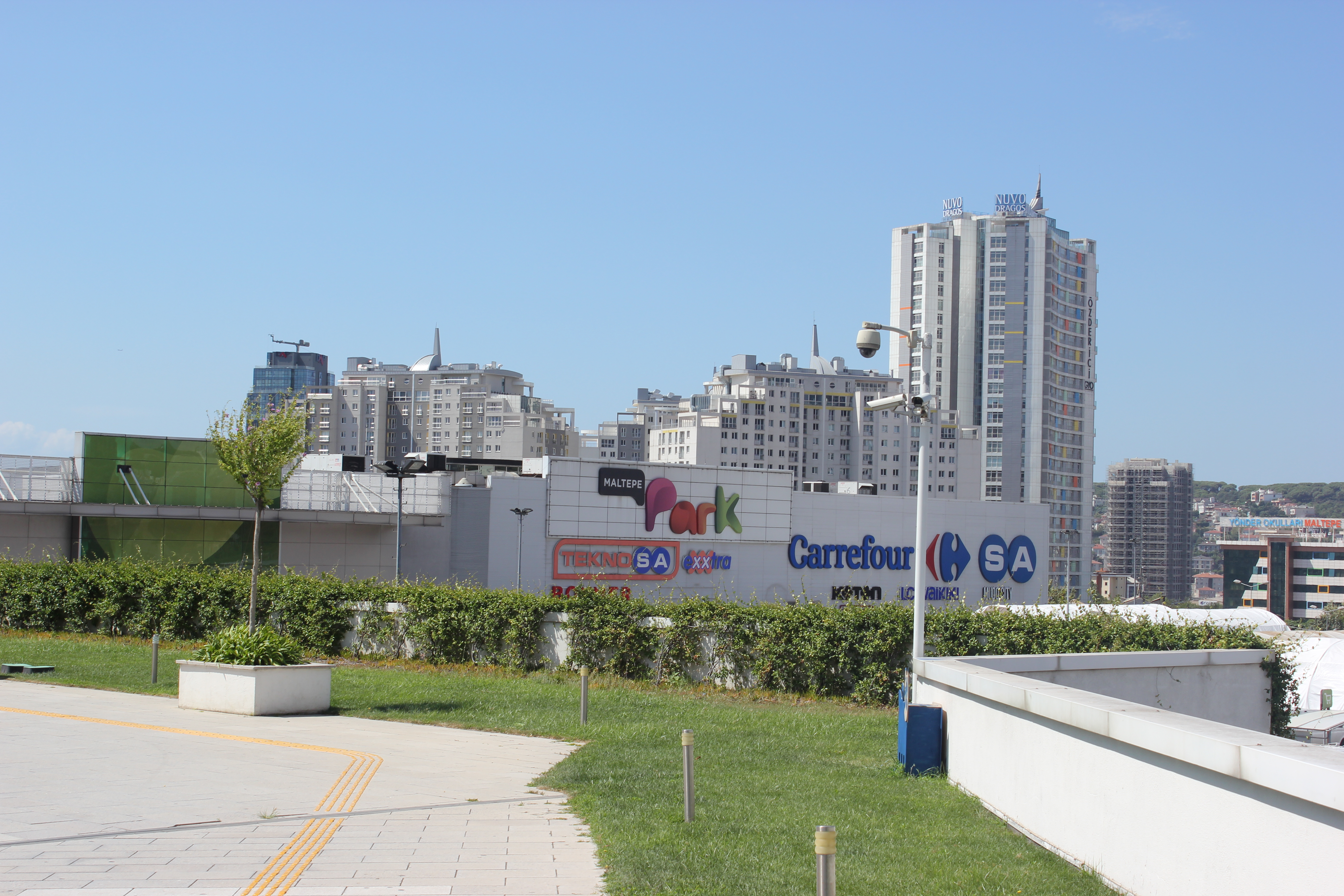
CarrefourSA Maltepe Park

CarrefourSA Maltepe Park, also known as Maltepe Park, opened on February 12, 2005, is a modern shopping mall in Cevizli neighborhood of Maltepe district in Istanbul, Turkey.

The shopping mall is owned by CarrefourSA, a joint venture of French retail giant Carrefour with the Turkish Sabancı Holding. The cost of the investment totaled to €80 million. The grand opening was performed by the Prime Minister Recep Tayyip Erdoğan.

The complex, on the highway D.100 eastwards from Istanbul, houses 102 stores, a Carrefour hypermarket (12th of the same brand in Turkey), fast food restaurants and an entertainment center with movie theaters in an area of 71,000 m^{2} (760,000 sq ft) on three floors. The mall's parking lot has a capacity for 2,500 cars. Around 1,400 service people are employed in the property.

== Renovation and expansion ==
The shopping mall was renovated and expanded after construction works that lasted 21 months. The leasable area increased from 31,000 m^{2} (330,000 sq ft) to 75,000 m^{2} (810,000 sq ft). The number of stores and premises in the food court reached to 250, and the capacity of the parking lot to 3,500. The construction cost €70 million. The shopping mall celebrated its 10th anniversary in January 2015.

== See also ==
- List of shopping malls in Istanbul
