= Istanbul Shopping Fest =

Shopping festival in Istanbul, Turkey

Istanbul Shopping Fest İstanbul Alışveriş Festivali
- Genre: Shopping
- Begins: 18 March
- Ends: 26 April
- Frequency: Annual
- Locations: Istanbul, Turkey
- Years active: 15
- Inaugurated: 18 March 2011 – 26 April 2011
- Website: www.istshopfest.com

The Istanbul Shopping Fest is an annual shopping festival held in Istanbul, Turkey. Established in 2011, the mission of the Festival is to make Istanbul the shopping, culture and entertainment center of the world.

During the festival, which lasts 40 days and 40 nights, all the contributing shops offer special discounts. The festival especially attracts foreign tourists as the shops offer tax free shopping. Historic sites in Istanbul also participate in the festival by closing two hours later than usual.

== History ==
The first Istanbul Shopping Fest took place between 18 March and 26 April 2011 and lasted for 40 days.

== See also ==
- List of shopping malls in Istanbul
