= Hırka-i Şerif Mosque =

Mosque in Istanbul, Turkey

- Hırka-i Şerif Camii
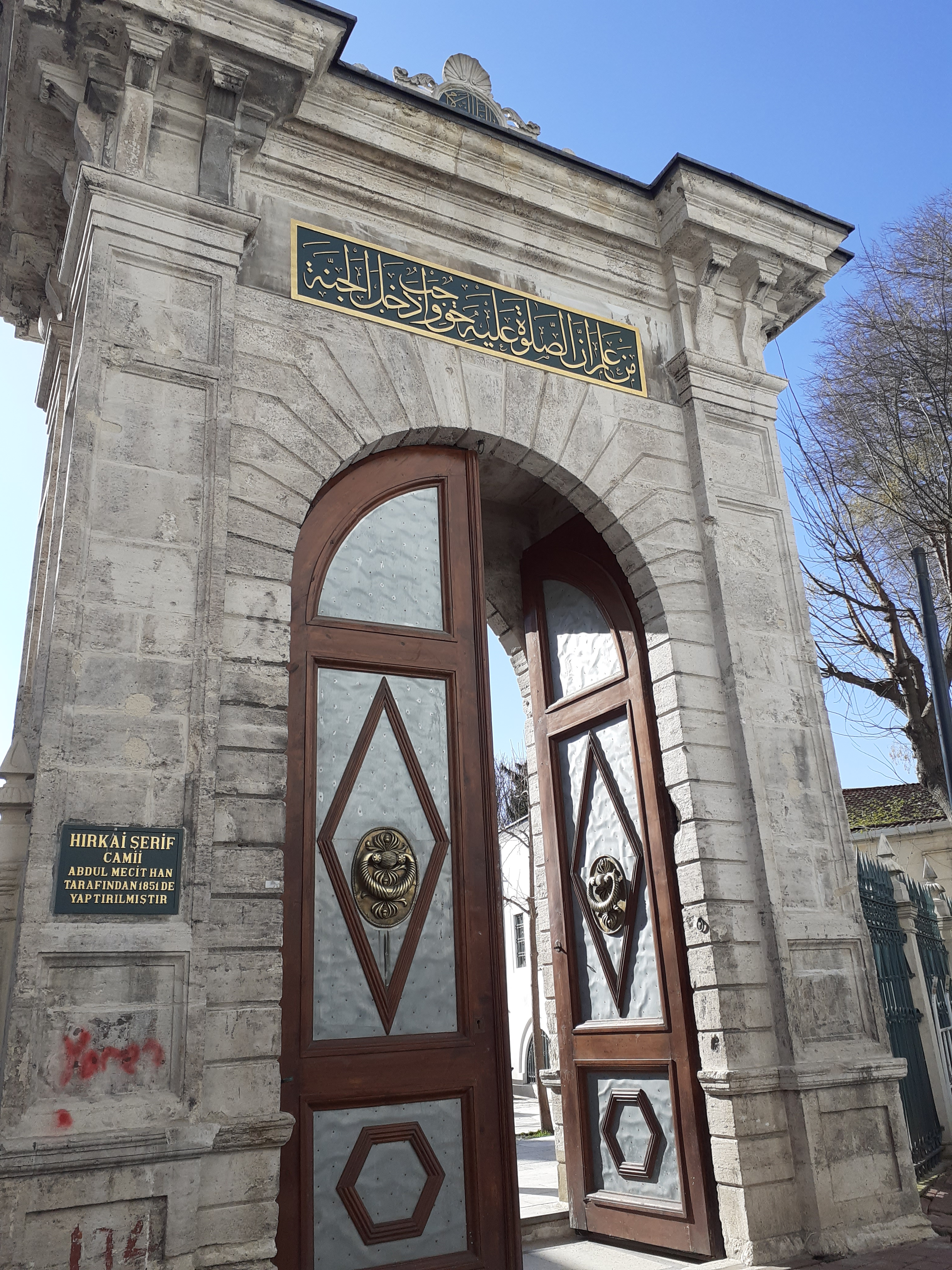

- Location of the mosque in Istanbul.

Religion
- Affiliation: Islam
- District: Fatih
- Province: Istanbul

Location
- Location: Fatih, Istanbul, Turkey
- Country: Turkey
- Coordinates: 41°01′18″N 28°56′30″E

Architecture
- Type: Mosque
- Groundbreaking: 1847
- Completed: 1851; 175 years ago
- Dome dia. (outer): 11.50 m (37.7 ft)

Hırka-i Şerif Mosque (Ottoman Turkish: خرقه شریف جامعي, Turkish: Hırka-i Şerif Camii) is a historic mosque in Istanbul, Turkey. It takes its name from a relic, the mantle of prophet Muhammad, which is preserved in the mosque.

== Mosque ==
Hırka-i Şerif Mosque (literally "Mosque of the Blessed Mantle") is situated at Hırkaişerif quarter's Muhtesip İskender neighborhood in Fatih district of Istanbul, Turkey. It was commissioned by Ottoman sultan Abdulmejid I (reigned 1839–1861). Its construction began in 1847 after expropriation of buildings in the near neighborhood to make place, and it was completed in 1851. The mosque is associated with a relic, a mantle of the Islamic prophet Muhammad (c. 570–632) (Ottoman Turkish: Hırka-i Şerif), which was given as a gift to Uwais al-Qarani, known as Veysel Karani in Turkish, a 7th-century Islamic figure from Yemen highly respected by the Turks.

A complex was added to the mosque, which consisted of a sultan's pavilion, a mansion for the descendant family owning the relic, barracks for a gendarme company in charge of protection of the relic and quarters for the servants. The architect of the mosque is not known. The mosque is situated in the center of a walled yard, which has three gates at each side. The mosque has an octagonal prism form, which is considered to be influenced from the plan of Qubbat al-Sakhrah (built 688–692) in Jerusalem. Its dome has a diameter of 11.50 m (37.7 ft). For the storage of the relic, a small octagonal prism building is annexed to the wall facing qibla. The annex has entrances to the courtyard and connection to the mosque. The mosque and the relic storage building are constructed in limestone ashlar. Their domes are of lead-covered brickwork.

The mosque and the relic chamber underwent conservation and restoration works several times in the past. As of 2017, the mosque is closed to prayer. It is under restoration, it is now open for prayer.

== Blessed mantle relic ==
The relic, in the possession of the Uwais al-Qarani's descendants, came first to WesternAnatolia, and was brought later to Istanbul in the beginning of the 17th century following a decree of Sultan Ahmed I (r. 1603–1617). It was preserved in the residence of the descendant family. It is known that the relic was exhibited in a specially-built stone cell during Ramadan, the Islamic month of fasting, from the beginning of the 18th century. Ottoman sultans of the 18th and 19th century showed great respect to the relic, and built stone cells to ease the exhibition of the relic to the religious visitors. During the Ottoman era, the relic was exhibited in the second half Ramadan while the third week of the fasting month was reserved for male visitors and the fourth week for females. In the Republican era, this regulation was abandoned and mixed-gender visit became usual. During the Night of Power, a holy night in Ramadan, visiting of the relic is offered from the Tarawih, the extra night prayer in Ramadan, to the Fajr prayer, the dawn prayer.

The relic is still being displayed to the public during the four weeks from the first Friday of the holy month on until the eve of Ramadan festivities.

== See also ==
- Sacred Relics (Topkapı Palace)
- Relics of Muhammad
