= Marmara Park =

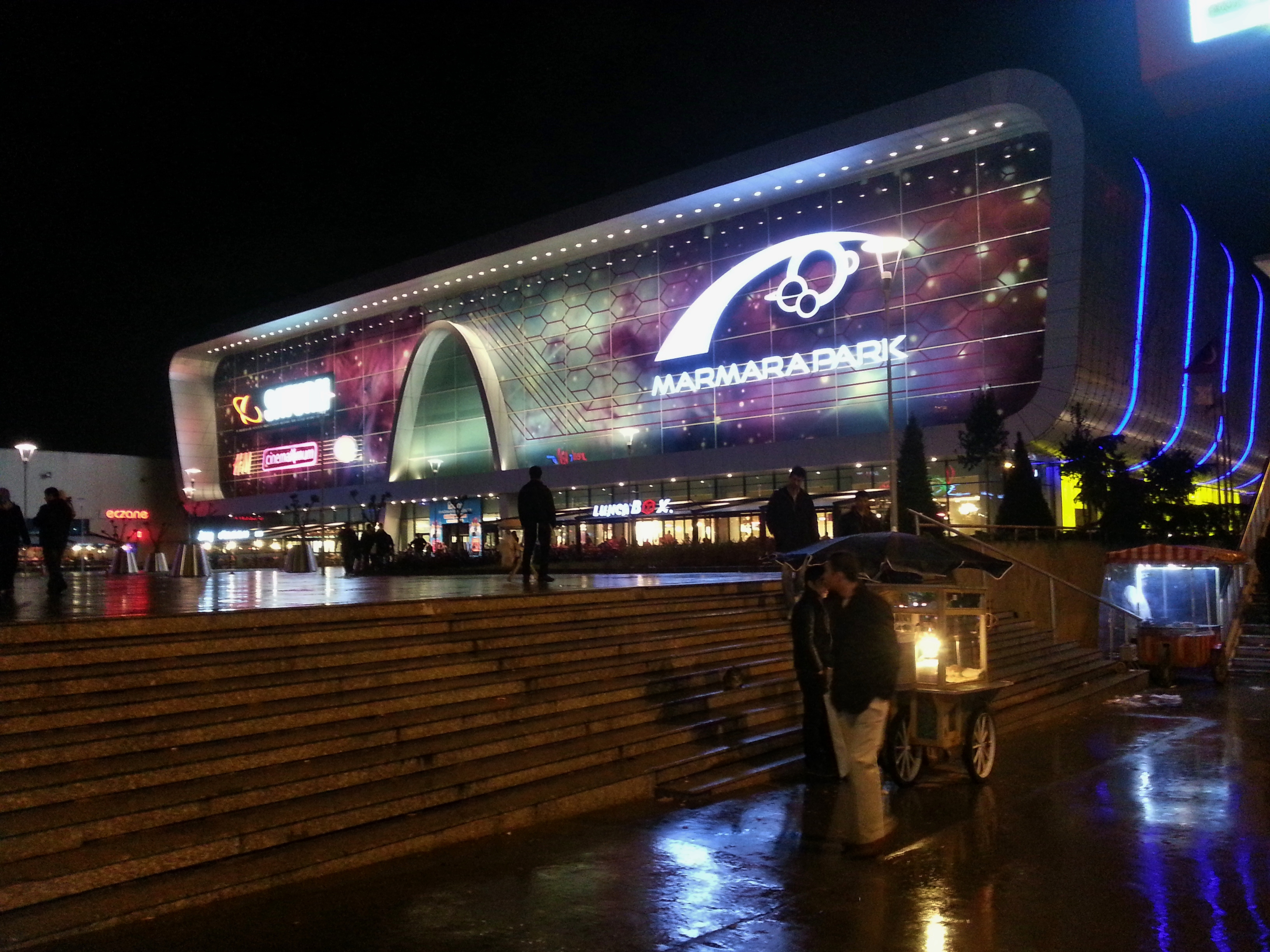
- Location: Esenyurt, Istanbul, Turkey
- Coordinates: 41°0′34″N 28°39′35″E
- Opened: 17 October 2012
- Owner: ECE Turkey Project Management Inc.
- Num. of stores: 250+ stores
- Floor area: 100 thousand square meters
- Floors: Four
- Parking: 4000 vehicles
- Website: marmarapark.com

Marmara Park is a shopping center in Esenyurt, Istanbul, Turkey.

Launched on October 17, 2012, by ECE Turkey, the establishment involved a €220 million investment, covering a 100,000 square meter expanse that was previously occupied by the Tatilya amusement park. The shopping center has more than 250 stores and a parking facility accommodating up to 4,000 vehicles. The shopping center operates from 10:00 to 22:00.

== Establishment ==
The foundation for the Marmara Park Shopping Center (Mall) was laid 2011, to be constructed through the collaboration of ECE Turkey, a subsidiary of the German ECE, and Deutsche Bank's investment company DWS, along with Finansbank, İş GYO, and Kayı İnşaat.

The Marmara Park Mall, which has an investment volume of 220 million euros, was held at the construction site in Esenyurt.

The ECE holds 50% stake in the Marmara Park investment, while the remaining 50% is owned by Deutsche Bank's investment company DWS. Finansbank is participating as the financing bank, providing a loan of 115 million euros for the project.

The land for the construction of the Marmara Park Mall was provided by İş GYO, and Kayı İnşaat, which has been involved in ECE's shopping center projects in Europe, is the company responsible for the construction of the Marmara Park project.

The shopping center is located in the Beylikdüzü Esenyurt area, one of Istanbul's fastest-growing centers, situated on the E-5 Highway. Large-scale residential areas was planned in the construction phase in the region. Research indicates that while the population in the area is rapidly increasing, approximately 4 million people currently reside within the attraction area of the Marmara Park Mall.

With a total leasable area of 100,000 square meters, including the Bauhaus Building Market and Real Hypermarket, Marmara Park is Turkey's first galactic-themed shopping center.

Which offering visitors a brand-new shopping galaxy with 250 stores and a parking area for 4,000 vehicles. Before construction began, approximately 40% of the mall's leasable area had already been rented out.
