= Ramsey (retailer) =

Turkish clothing manufacturer and retailer

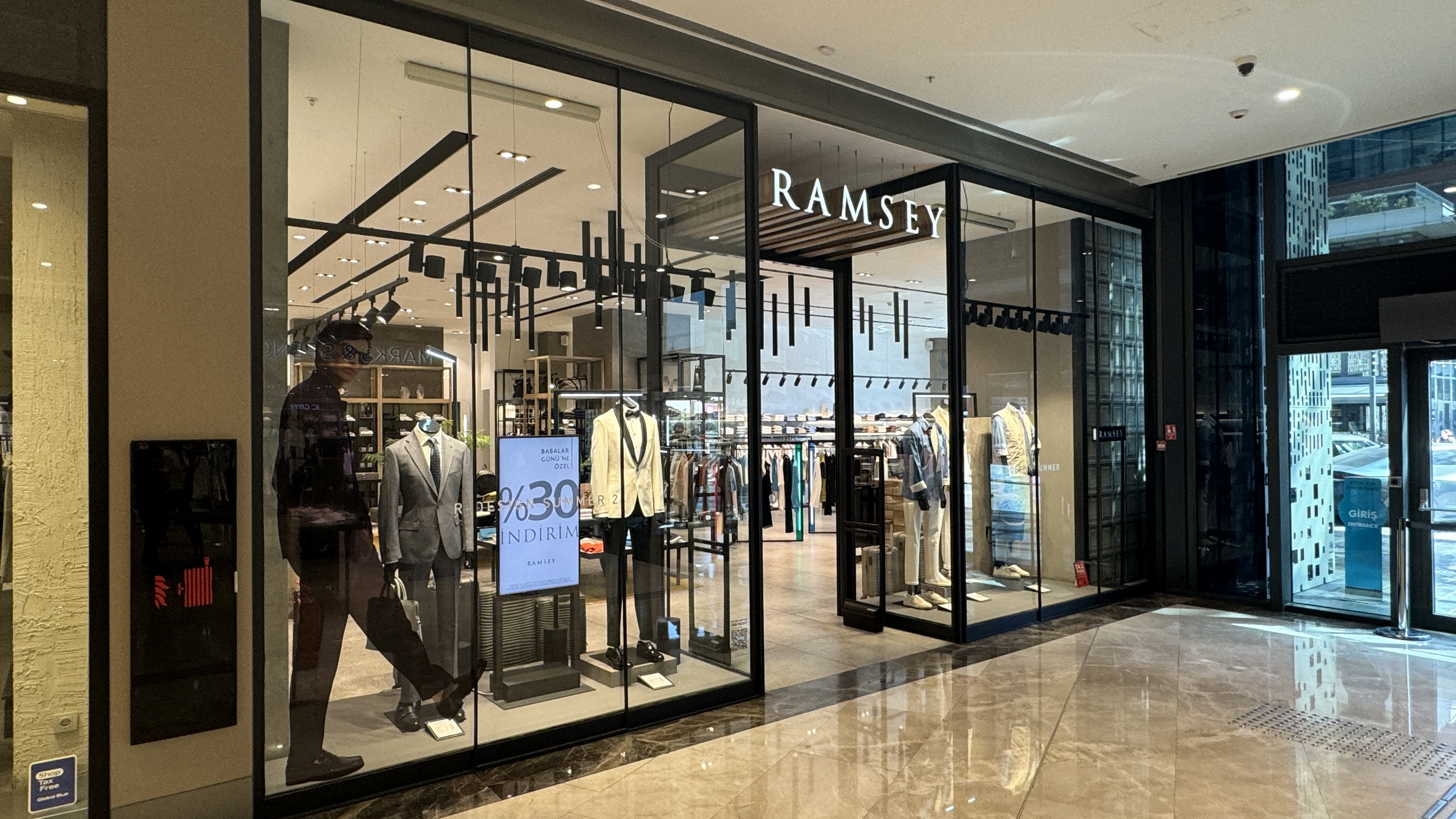
Ramsey store at Vadistanbul shopping center, Istanbul, 2024

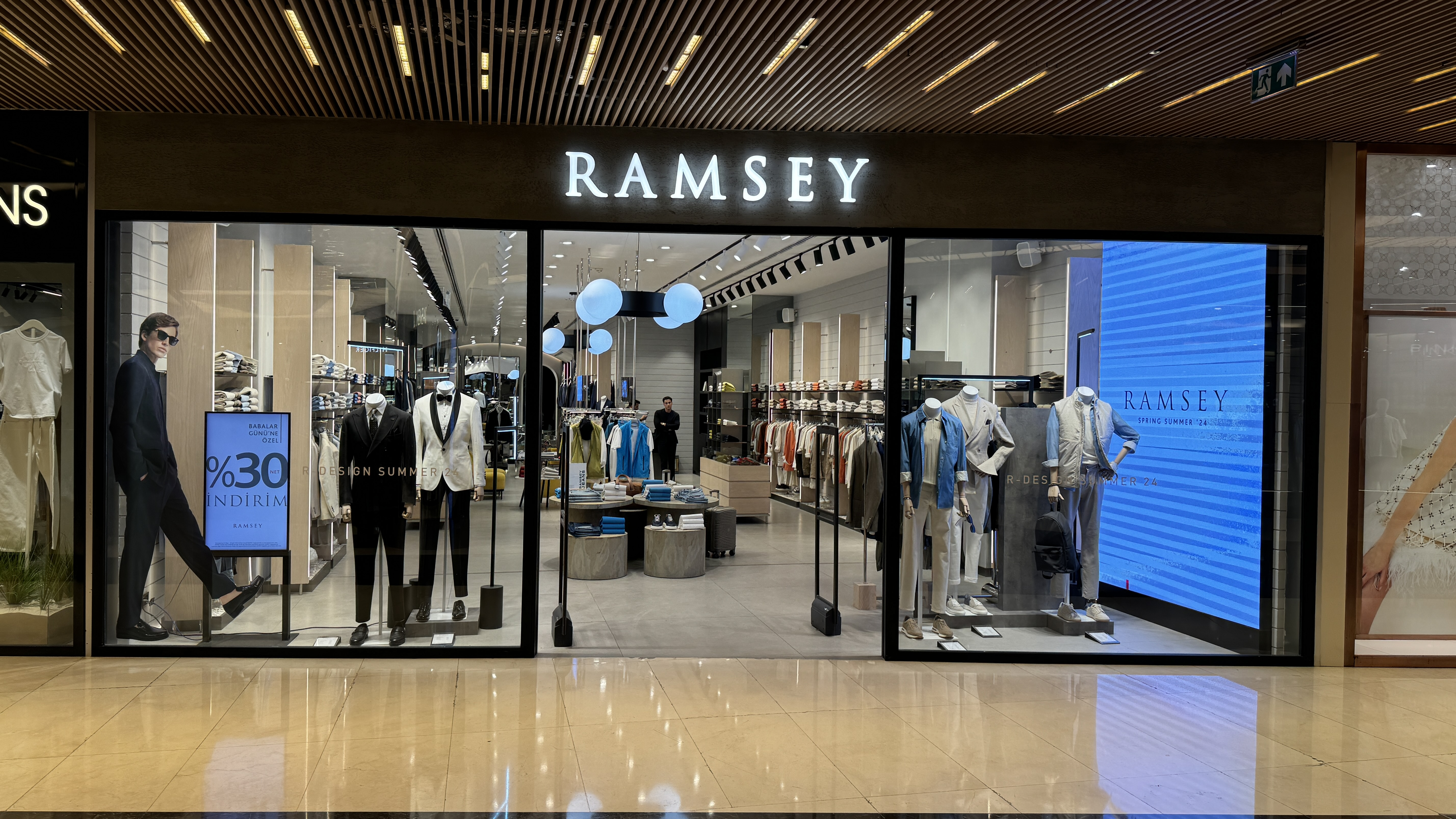
Ramsey store at Zorlu Center, Istanbul, 2024

Ramsey is a Turkish clothing retailer, designer, manufacturer and marketing enterprise founded by Remzi Gür and owned by Gürmen Group, which also operates the KİP brand. Ramsey retails its own clothing under its house brand in its boutiques, but also 40% of Ramsey's production is for other, foreign, brands.

== History ==
Ramsey's first clothing was designed in a workshop in London in 1972. In 1985, its founders moved production to Turkey. The first Ramsey store in England opened in 2001 and its first concept store in Turkey opened in the large Istanbul Cevahir mall in 2005.

As of 2024, there are 78 Ramsey stores with 58 of those in Turkey, including 29 Ramsey (main brand) concept stores, 15 group stores, 7 outlets and 7 franchise stores. Other stores are in North Macedonia, Ukraine, Azerbaijan, the UAE, Armenia, Qatar, Kazakhstan, Russia, and the Palestine region.

In 2012, Ramsey signed a two-year sponsorship contract as the official formal wear supplier for Liverpool FC.
