= Özdilek =

Turkish retail company

Özdilek Holding
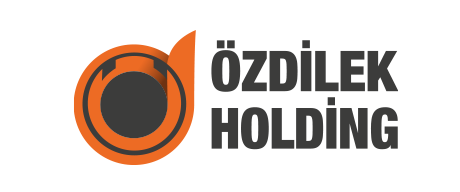
- Founded: 1971
- Founder: Hüseyin Özdilek
- Headquarters: Bursa, Turkey
- Number of employees: 8000
- Website: www.ozdilekholding.com.tr

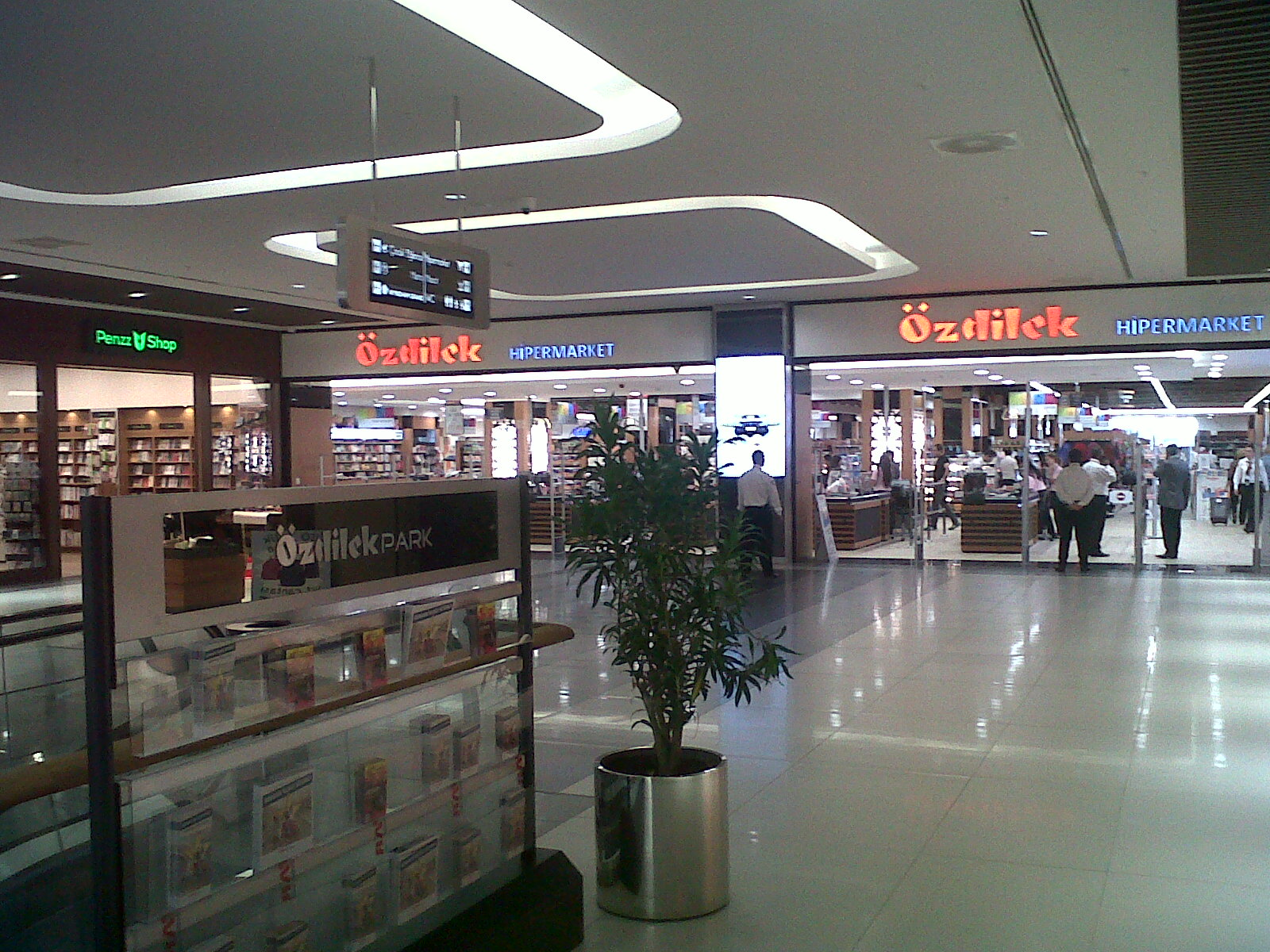
Özdilek hypermarket at ÖzdilekPark mall, Istanbul

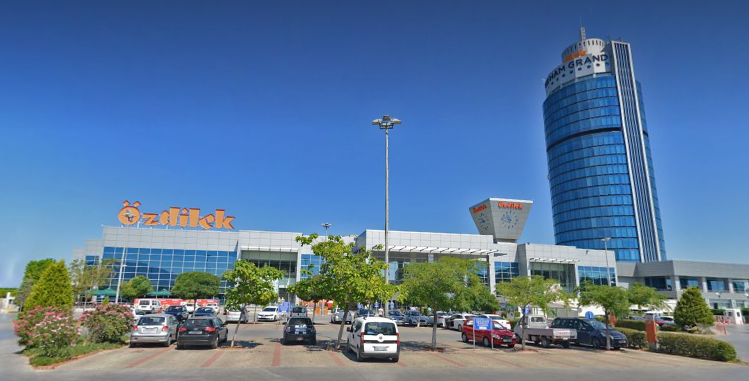
Balçova İnciraltı store, İzmir, 2015.

Özdilek is the name of chains of hypermarkets, department stores, and home textile stores, together with ÖzdilekPark shopping malls, all part of Özdilek Holding. The holding company's main activities are in the retail sector where it started in 1967, and in the textile manufacturing sector, where it started investing in 1971, producing bed and bath linens. It had a turnover of 1.5 billion TRY (Turkish lira) in 2016.

The retail businesses include:

- 14 shopping centers
  - 3 are large ÖzdilekPark shopping malls: Antalya, Bursa and Istanbul
    - ÖzdilekPark Bursa opened in 2017 and measures 60,000 m^{2} (650,000 sq ft) with 55 stores and cost 55 million US dollars to build
  - 11 are smaller with mostly or only Özdilek-operated businesses as tenants, in Afyonkarahisar, Bolu, Bursa–Geçit, Bursa–Nilüfer, Düzce, Eskişehir, İzmir, Kocaeli (İzmit), Turgutlu, Uşak and Yalova
- 10 Özdilek Hipermarket hypermarkets:
  - 8 in Bursa including 1 at ÖzdilekPark Bursa mall
  - 1 at ÖzdilekPark Antalya mall
  - 1 at ÖzdilekPark Istanbul mall
- 10 Özdilek Departman Mağaza department stores (Turkish: Departman Mağazalar)
  - in Istanbul at ÖzdilekPark Istanbul, Mall of Istanbul, Torium, Vega, and Vialand malls
  - also at ÖzdilekPark Antalya, Özdilekpark Bursa, and in the cities of Serdivan (Sakarya), Tekirdağ, and Erzurum
- 159 Özdilek Ev Tekstili home textile stores
- Clothing lines, sold online and in Özdilek hypermarkets and department stores
  - Finesuits
  - First Company
  - Funfair (children's clothing)
  - Shefame (women's clothing)
- Home textiles sold online and at Özdilek retail stores
  - Floretta
  - Sadem Organik
- Hotels:
  - Wyndham Grand İstanbul hotel (located in Özdilek Center)
  - Wyndham Grand İzmir hotel
- Restaurants and cafés:
  - Careme Restaurant
  - Gold Time (coffee and snack bars)
  - Kafe Safahat
  - Partly Cloudy Cafe
  - Safahat Lokantası
  - Sütfest (ice cream)
  - Vertice (café/brasserie)
- Other businesses and organizations:
  - Cinetime cinemas
  - Corewish (R&D)
  - Game Factory (game arcades at Özdilek malls)
  - Game Machine Bowling (bowling alleys at ÖzdilekPark Antalya and Bursa malls)
  - Lavandi (dry cleaning)
  - Modaletto (home textiles sold by third party retailers)
  - My Auto (vehicle maintenance centers)
  - Orange City (residential, office and retail construction)
  - Ozone Night Club
  - Özdilek Akademi (training academy for employees)
  - Özdilek Center (316,895 m^{2} (3,411,030 sq ft) mixed-use development in Levent, Istanbul, including the ÖzdilekPark Istanbul mall)
  - Özdilek Hotel Tourism
  - Özdilek İthalat & İhracat (import/export)
  - Özdilek Lokum (Turkish delight)
  - Özdilek Vakfı (Education, health, culture and art foundation)
  - Özdilekteyim (lit. "I am at Özdilek", consolidated e-commerce site including groceries, clothing and other goods from Özdilek hypermarkets and department stores)
  - Özlü Sigorta insurance
  - Qualitasspa spa
  - River Plaza (36,000 m^{2} (390,000 sq ft) office tower in Özdilek Center)
  - Tabiat Tarım (cattle, fruit and vegetable farm)
  - Tex İdea (Salzbergen, Germany-based textile trading house)
  - We You They (magazine)

Additional areas of activity of the holding include R&D, energy, e-commerce, food, construction, business centers, import-export, wellness centers, other retail, insurance, tourism, and agriculture including a livestock farm.

Özdilek logo
