= Dizdariye =

Neighborhood in Büyükçekmece district, Istanbul, Turkey

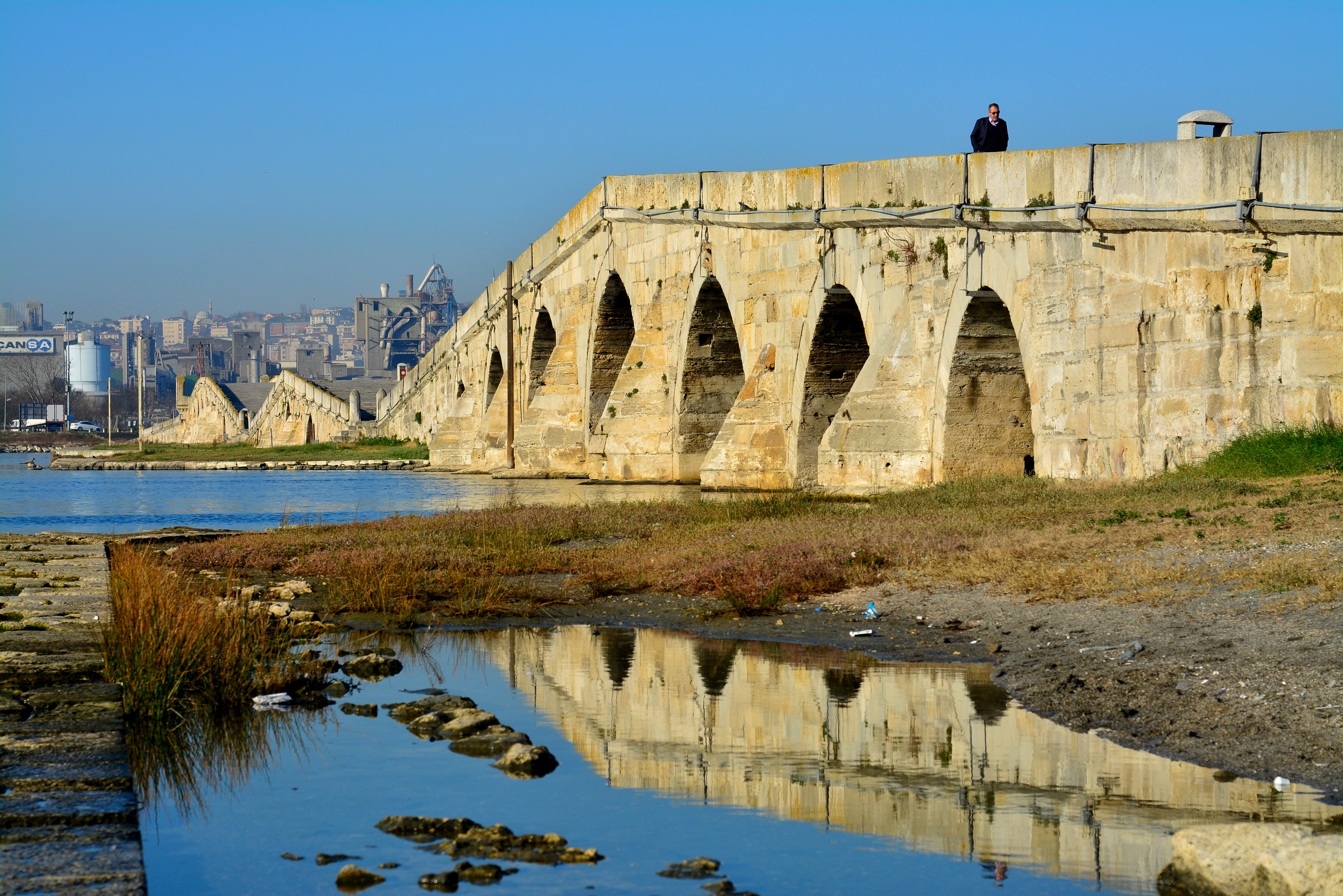
Büyükçekmece Bridge

Dizdariye is a neighborhood (mahalle) in the Büyükçekmece District, Istanbul, Turkey. Its population is 6,987 (2019). It is home to many Ottoman-era structures.

== Location ==
Dizdariye is bordered on the north by Lake Büyükçekmece, on the east by the 19 Mayıs neighborhood, on the south by the Fatih neighborhood, and on the east by Lake Büyükçekmece.

== Historic sites ==
- Imaret Mosque, a 15th-century mosque
- Sultan Süleyman Caravanserai (also called Kurşunlu (Leaded) Han), a 15th-century caravanserai built by Mimar Sinan
- Büyükçekmece Bridge, commissioned by Süleyman, built by Mimar Sinan in 1566-67
- Kanuni Sultan Süleyman Fountain, a 16th-century fountain, commissioned by Süleyman at the beginning of his Szigetvár campaign in 1566, built by Mimar Sinan
- Sokollu Mehmet Paşa Mescit (also called Köprübaşı (Bridgehead) Mosque), a small 16th-century mosque built by Mimar Sinan; it has a minaret with an external staircase (minber-minare) at its entrance, separate from the main building
- Fatih Mosque, an old mosque built at an unknown date (but probably not during the time of Fatih Mehmed II)
- Enver Paşa Fountain, an 18th-century fountain built during the time of Mahmut I, called "Enver Paşa" because of its location on Enver Paşa Avenue
- Süleyman Ağa Fountain, built in 1856 by Hatice Hatun in memory of her son Süleyman Ağa, who was killed in the Crimean War
- Abdülhamit II Fountain and Pool, built in 1900-01
- Enver Paşa Hunting Lodge (köşk)
- Yörük Ali Efe Memorial House, a reconstruction of the house of Ali Efe's stepfather
