= Büyükçekmece Dam =

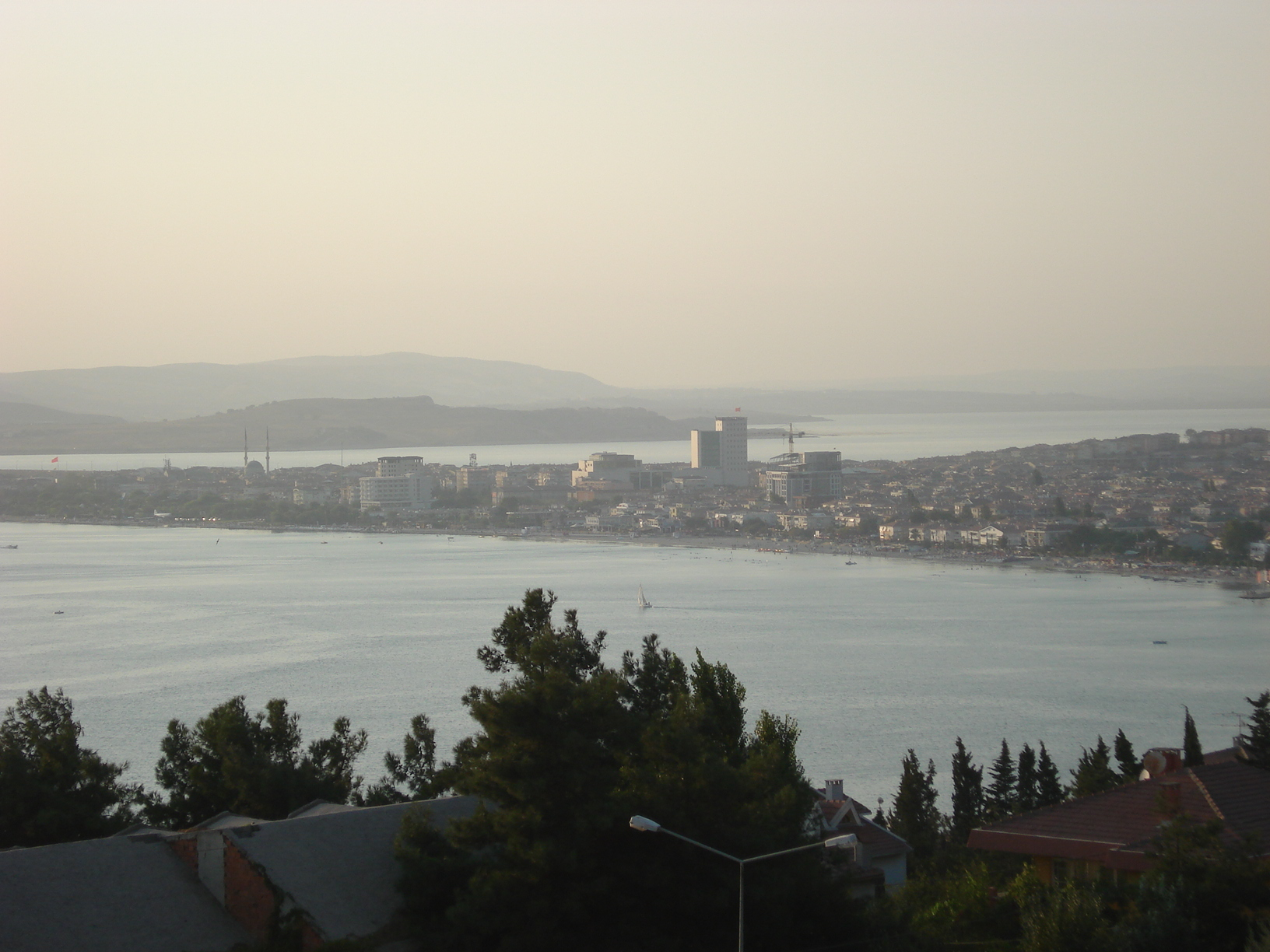

- Location of Büyükçekmece Dam in Istanbul Province.
- Location: Büyükçekmece, Istanbul, Turkey
- Coordinates: 41.0257°N 28.5688°E
- Construction began: 1983
- Opening date: 1988; 38 years ago
- Owner: Turkish State Hydraulic Works (DSİ)

Dam and spillways
- Impounds: Lake Büyükçekmece
- Height: 13 m (43 ft)

Reservoir
- Total capacity: 162 hm^{3} (5.7×10^{9} cu ft)
- Catchment area: 620 km^{2} (240 sq mi)
- Surface area: 43 km^{2} (17 sq mi)

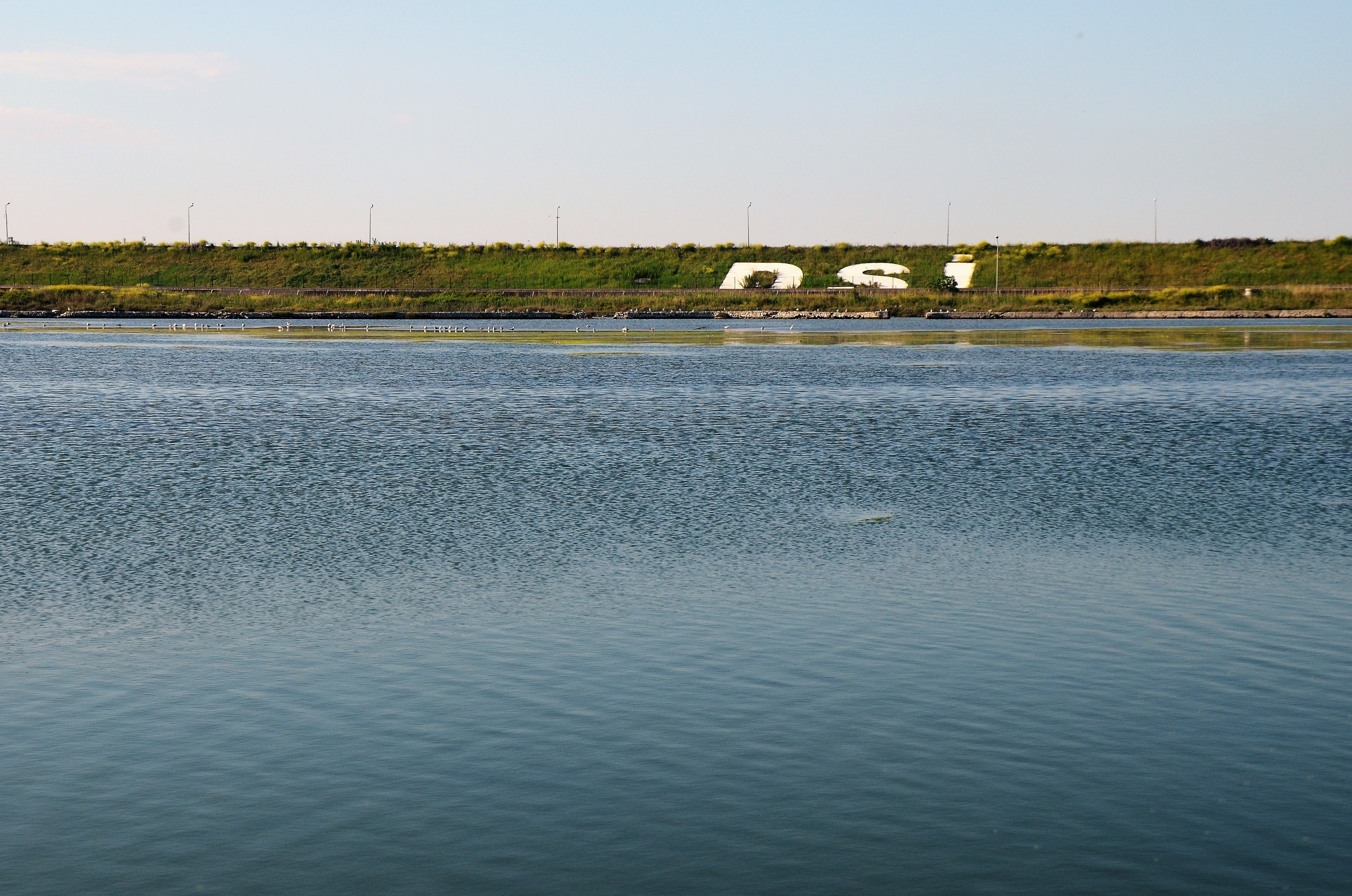
Büyükçekmece Dam on the Lake Büyükçekmece seen from the Büyükçekmece Bridge towards north.

Büyükçekmece Dam (Turkish: Büyükçekmece Barajı) is a dam on the Lake Büyükçekmece in Büyükçekmece district of Istanbul Province, Turkey. The development was backed by the Turkish State Hydraulic Works (DSİ), and was opened in 1988.

Büyükçekmece Dam was built to supply residential water to Istanbul. The construction started in 1983, and the dam was completed in 1988. Water supply from the dam's reservoir went into service in 1989. It is located in Büyükçekmece district on the European part of Istanbul on the Lake Büyükçekmece, which is formed by disconnecting the stream Sarısu's outflow to the Marmara Sea. It is an earth-fill embarkment dam of 13 m (43 ft) height. The dam's catchment area is 620 km^{2} (240 sq mi). The reservoir has a capacity of 162 hm^{3} (5.7×10^{9} cu ft) covering a surface of 43 km^{2} (17 sq mi) at normal pool. The reservoir water is sanitated before it is supplied to the households. Annual water supply capacity of the dam is 100,000,000 m^{3} (3.5×10^{9} cu ft).

Büyükçekmece Barajı, 1983-88 yılları arasında BM Holding(İnşaat) tarafından tava şeklinde, dolgu baraj olarak yapıldı.Dolgu malzemesi, tavalar şeklinde düzenlenen ve tava kenarlarına geçirimsiz perde duvarlar yapılarak, orta kısımlar yine geçirimsiz kil malzeme ile sıkılaştırılarak yapıldı. Tava kenarları, bu konuda özel iş tecrübesi ve ekipmanın sahip, baraj taşeronu Kutlutaş Holding tarafından yapıldı.

== See also ==
- List of dams and reservoirs in Turkey
- Water supply and sanitation in Istanbul
