= Karasu (Istanbul) =

River in Istanbul, Turkey

The Karasu (Turkish for 'black water') is a short river in the Istanbul metropolitan area; it flows into the lake formed by the Büyükçekmece Dam. Anciently, the river was known as the Athyras (Ancient Greek: Ἀθύρας), and was considered a river of ancient Thrace that flowed between Selymbria and Byzantium (the later Istanbul). Pliny the Elder also calls it Pydaras.
