= Emre Arolat =

Turkish architect and professor

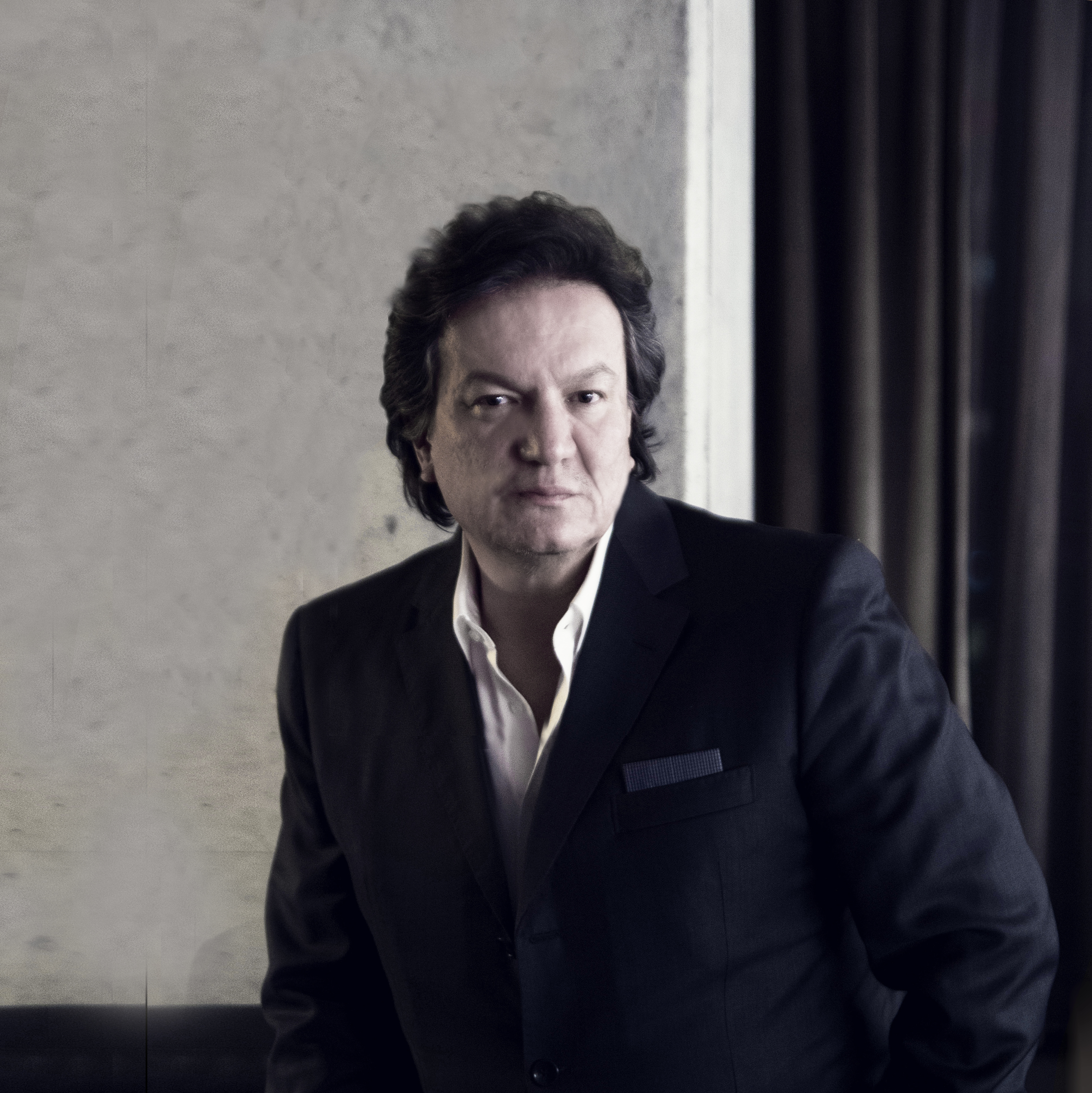
- Born: 24 June 1963 (age 63); Ankara, Turkey
- Education: Galatasaray High School; Mimar Sinan University
- Occupation: Architect
- Awards: International Property Award; Aga Khan Award for Architecture; Cityscape Global Dubai Awards; MIPIM AR Future Projects Award; Mies van der Rohe Award; World Architecture Festival Award; RIBA International Award
- Practice: EAA-Emre Arolat Architecture
- Website: www.emrearolat.com

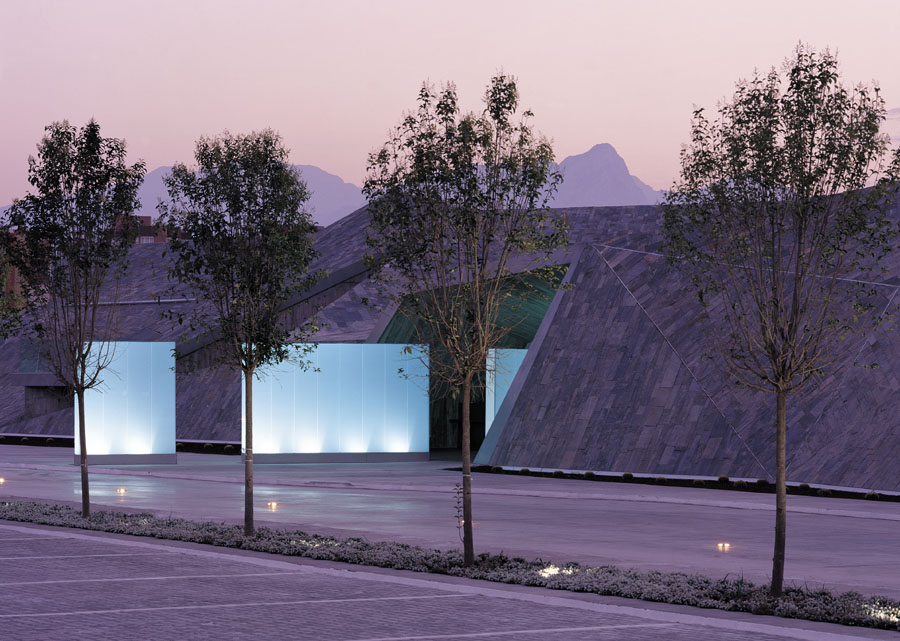
Minicity Theme Park, Antalya (2004)

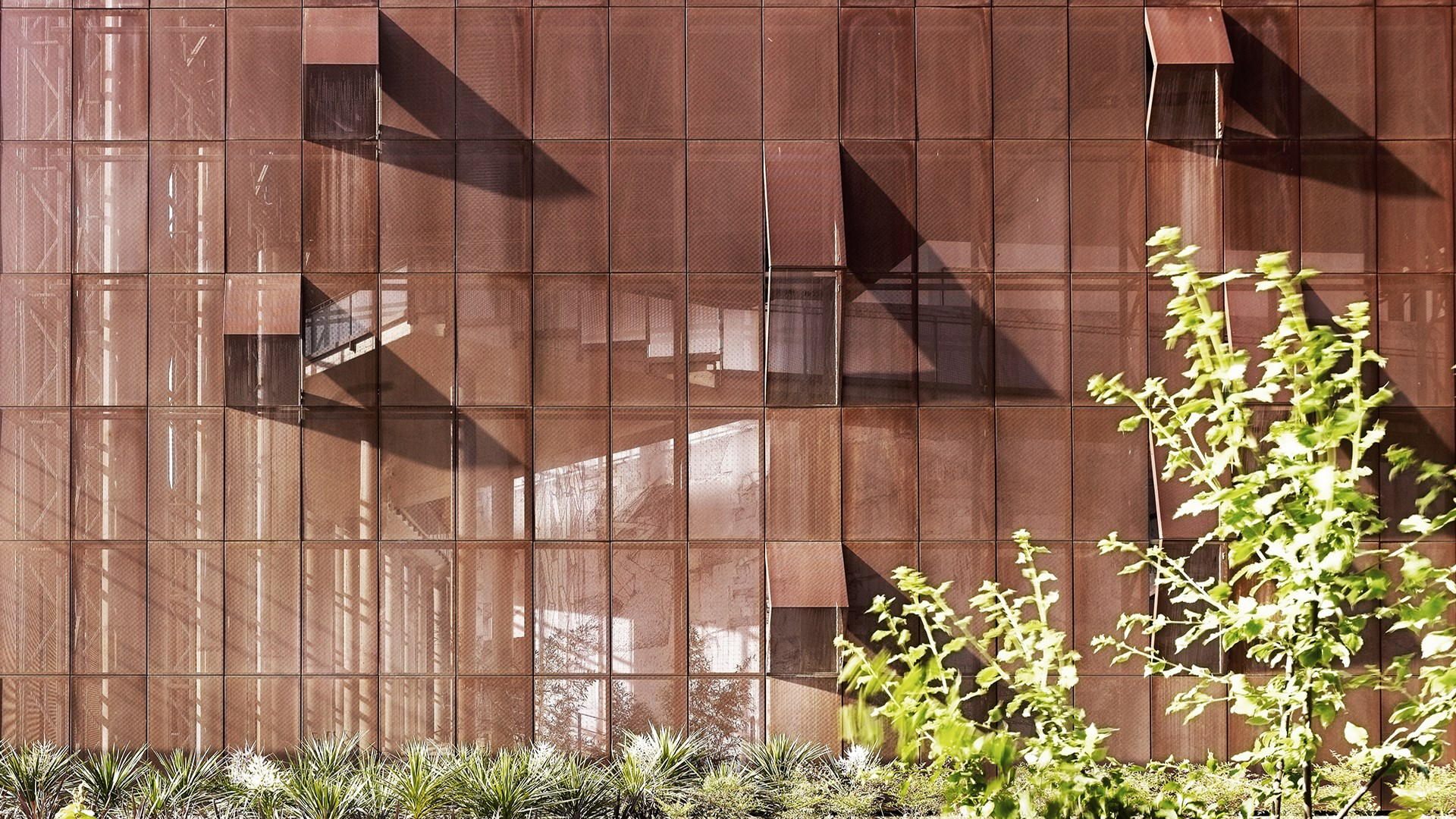
Raif Dinçkök Yalova Cultural Center, Yalova (2011)

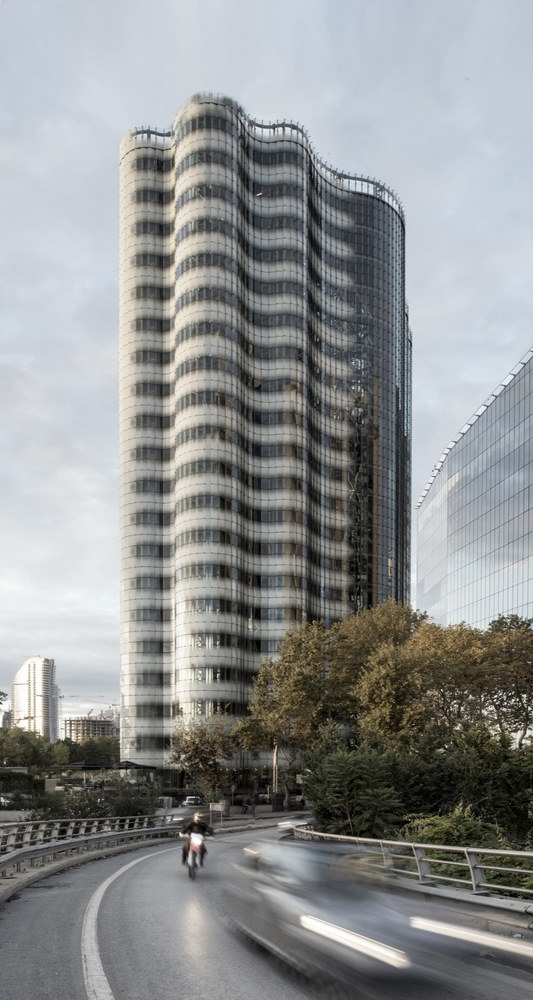
Maslak No.1 Office Building, Istanbul (2014)

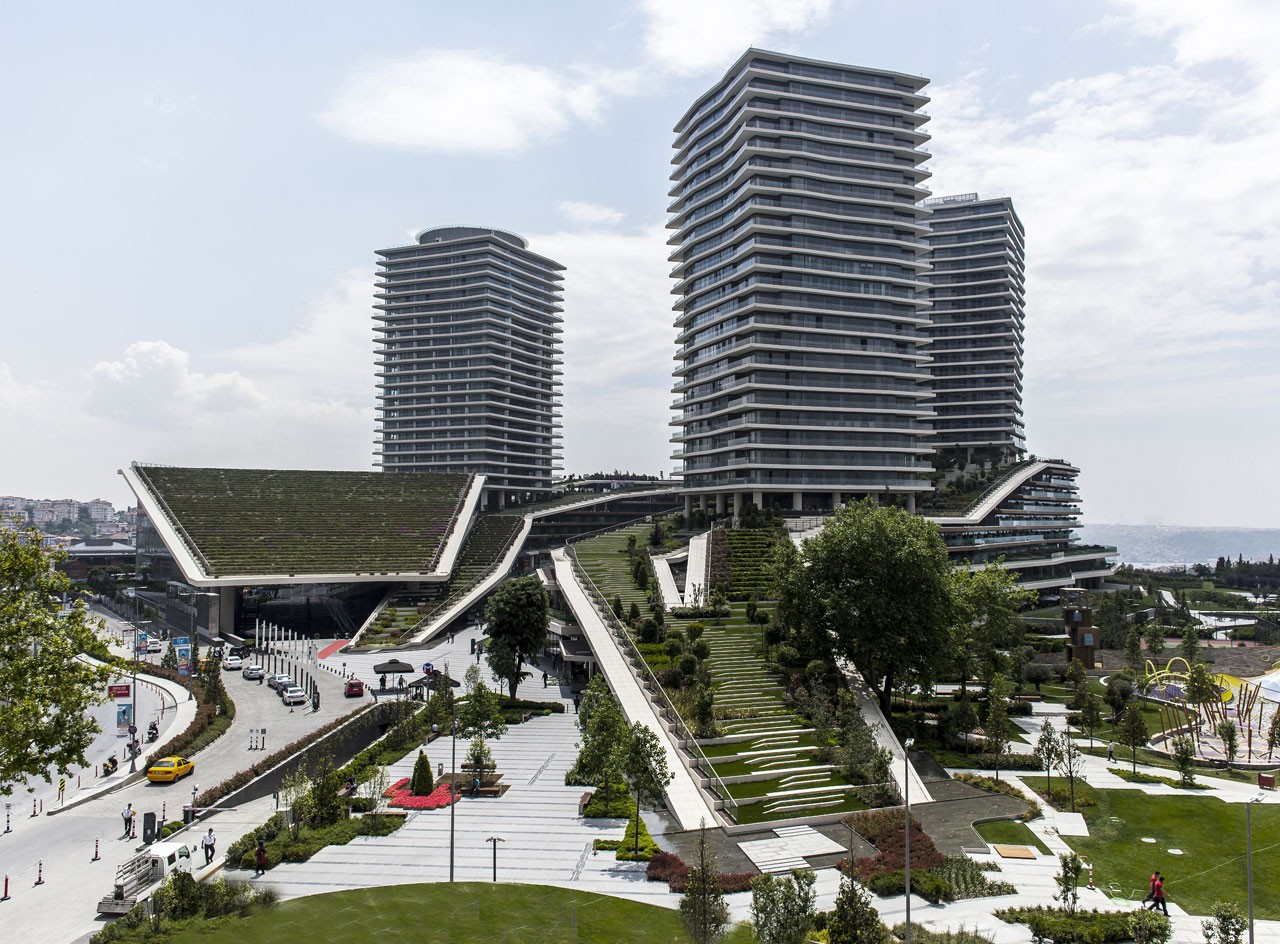
Zorlu Center, Istanbul (2013)

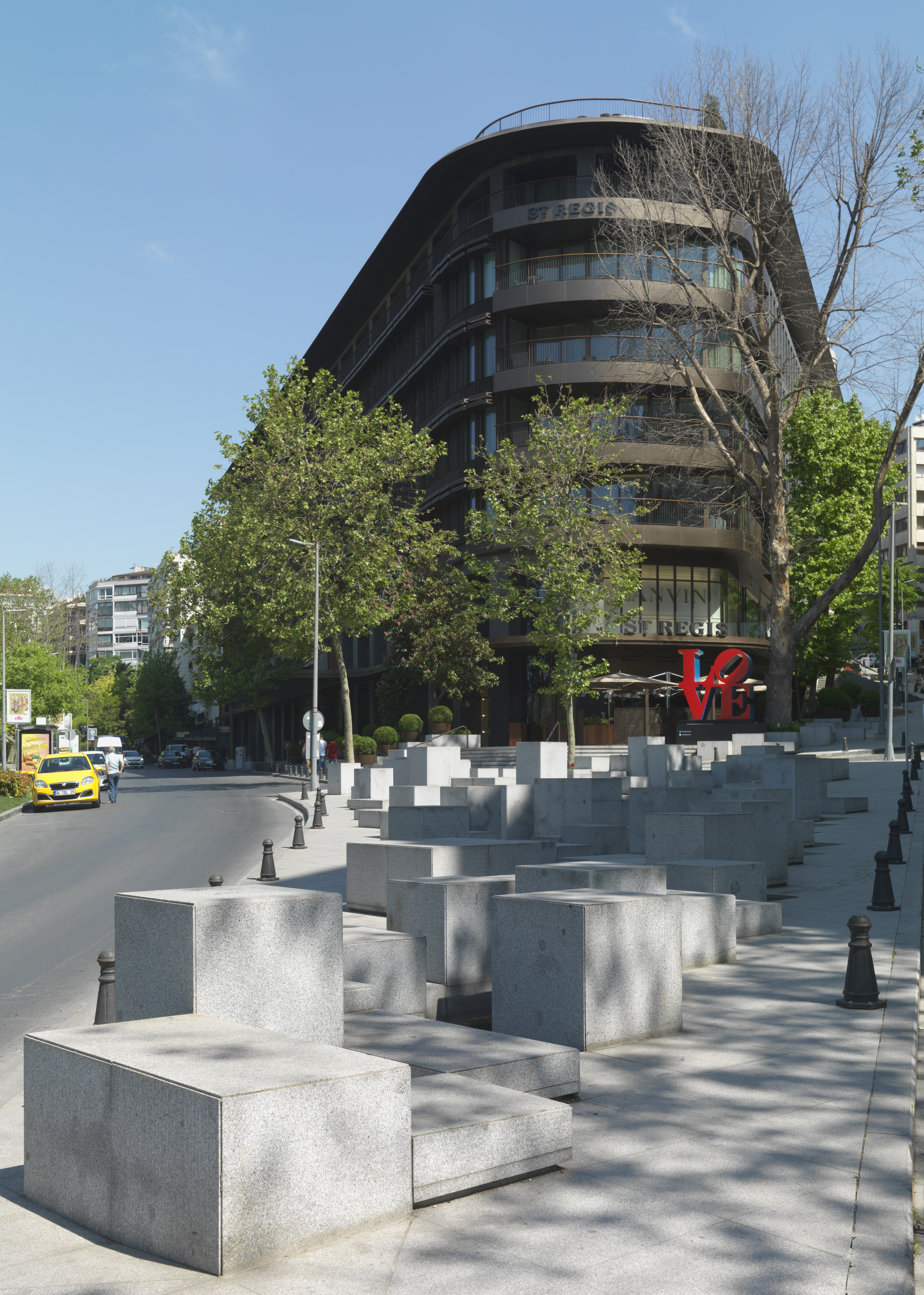
St.Regis Istanbul, Istanbul (2015)

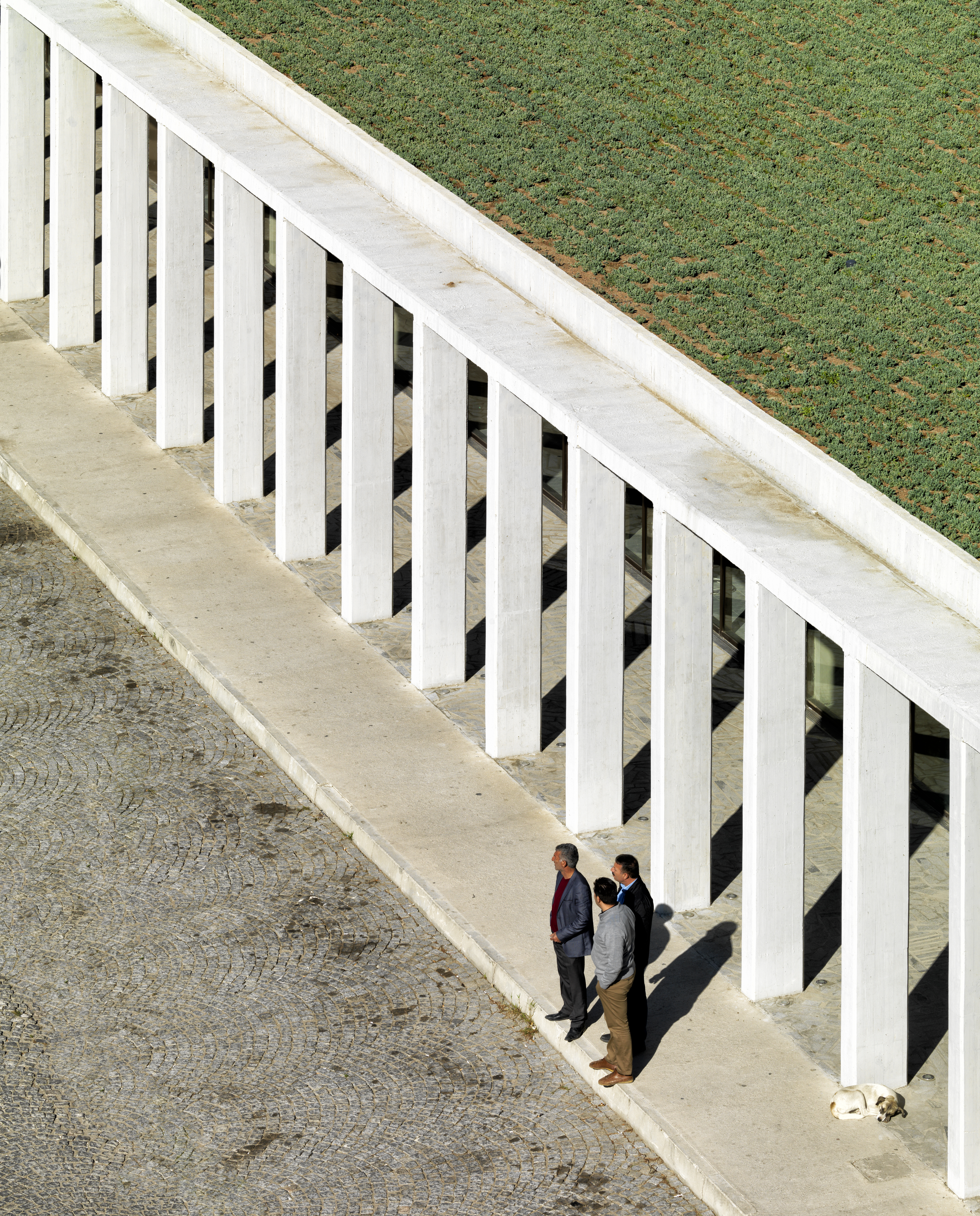
Bergama Cultural Center, Izmir (2016)

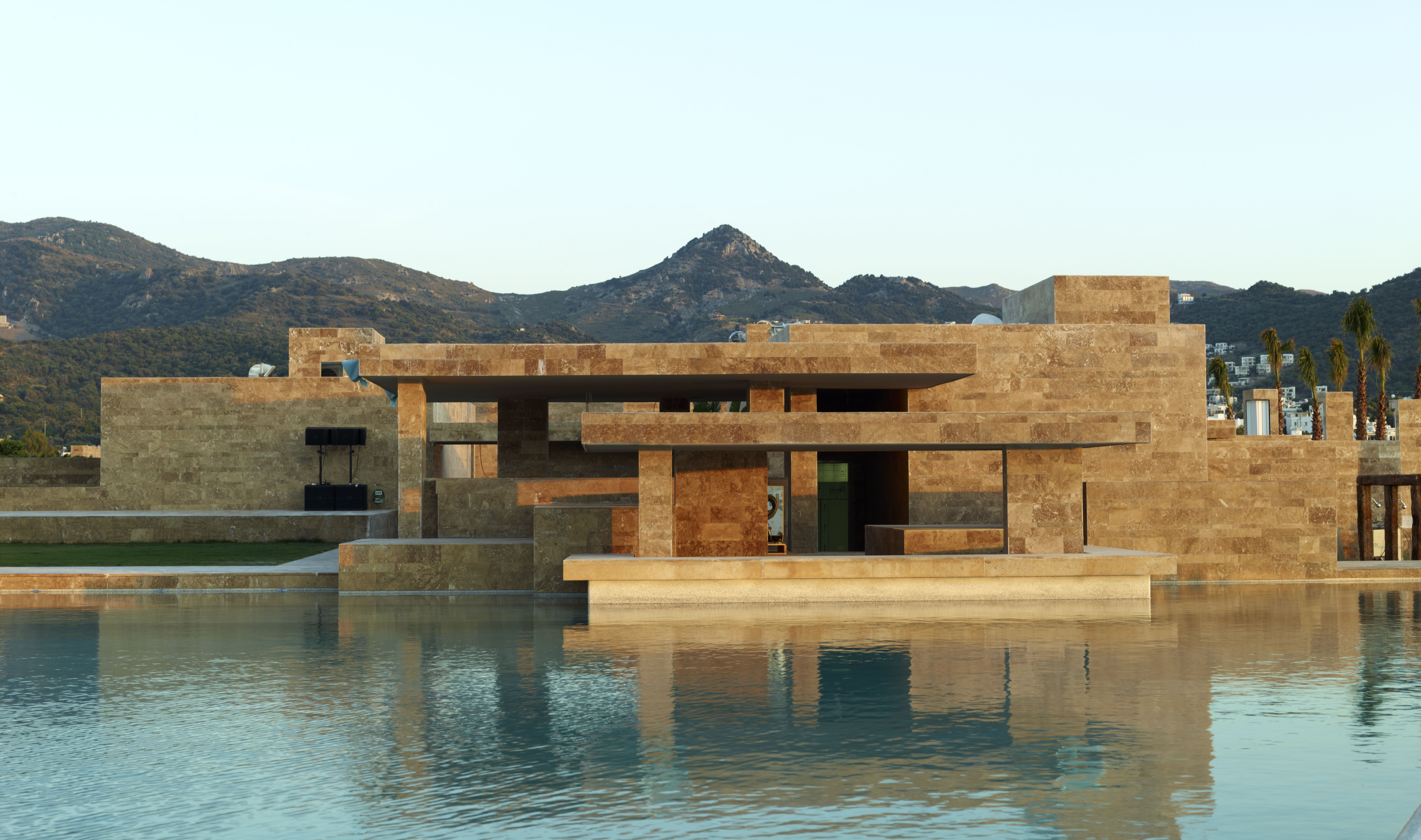
Yalikavak Palmarina, Bodrum (2014)

Emre Arolat (born 24 June 1963) is a Turkish architect. In 2004, he co-founded EAA-Emre Arolat Architecture with Gonca Paşolar. Arolat is best known for the construction of Sancaklar Mosque.

== Early life ==
Arolat was born in Ankara in 1963. After completing his education at Galatasaray High School, he studied at Mimar Sinan University in Istanbul where he received his BArch degree in architecture in 1986 and MArch degree in 1992. He then went to work at the Metcalf and Associates Architectural Office in Washington D.C. between 1986 and 1987.

== Awards ==
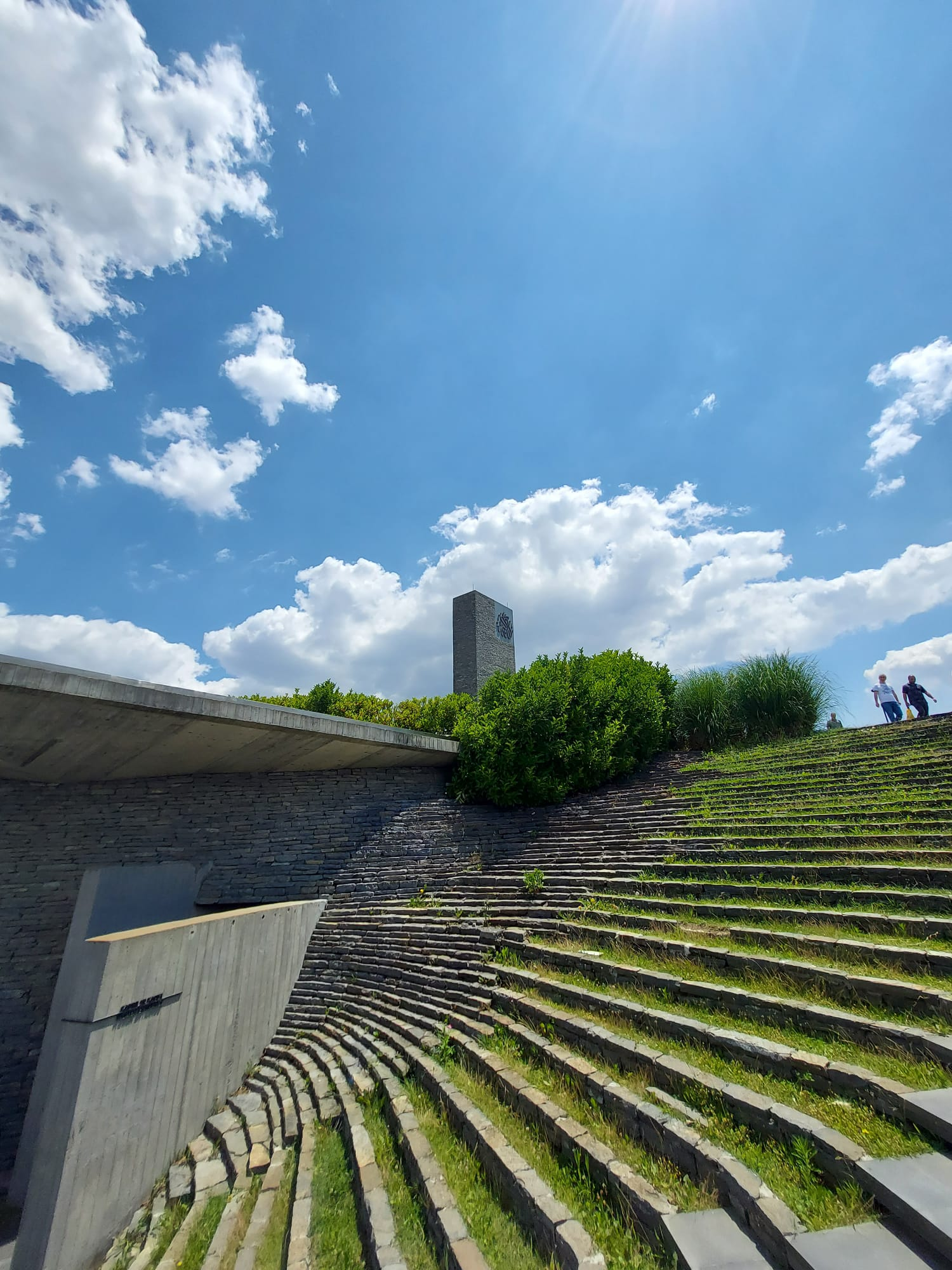
Sancaklar Mosque and its minaret (2023).

Arolat has received many national and international awards, including the 2005 Mies van der Rohe award for European Architecture (Highly Commended); 2006 AR Awards for Emerging Architecture (Highly Commended); 2013 WAF (World Architecture Festival) Winner of Religious Buildings category with the Sancaklar Mosque; 2014 WAF Winner of Shopping Category with the Yalıkavak Palmarina; Winner of Leisure-Led Category with the Antakya Museum Hotel; WAF Winner of Infrastructure Category with the Çukurova Airport in 2015 and Winner of Culture Category with the Istanbul Antrepo 5 – MSGSU Painting and Sculpture Museum. He also received the National Architecture Awards in the category of "Design" and "Building" in 1992, 2002, 2004, 2008, 2012 and 2014. He was awarded the Aga Khan Award for Architecture in 2010 with the İpekyol Textile Factory Building. In 2015 Sancaklar Mosque was awarded ArchDaily's Best Building of the Year and Mies van der Rohe award for European Architecture-Best 40 Building of the Year, also nominated for Design Museum-Designs of the Year award. In May 2015, the International Academy of Architecture accorded Emre Arolat the title of professor of the academy in recognition of his achievements in the development of contemporary architecture.

== Teaching ==
Since 1998, Emre Arolat has been teaching in architectural schools in Turkey and abroad, including Mimar Sinan University, Istanbul Bilgi University, Berlage Institute for Architecture, TU Delft and Erciyes University. He was also a visiting lecturer at the Pratt Institute, the Middle East Technical University and Istanbul Technical University. He has been invited to serve as a jury member for numerous architectural design competitions in Turkey and abroad, including the World Architecture Festival (WAF), European 8, Izmir Metropolitan Municipality Opera House Architectural Design Competition and the 2014 Çanakkale Antenna Tower International Competition and the Center for the Study of the Built Environment (CSBE) Student Award for Architectural Excellence in Amman. He was the 2017 Norman R. Foster Visiting Professor at Yale School of Architecture.

== Exhibitions ==
Arolat was one of two curators of the first Istanbul Design Biennial in 2012. He also curated "Musibet", an exhibition focusing on the social and physical effects of the rapid transformation processes taking place in Istanbul. The EAA curated the exhibitions "Nazaran.../With regard to...” in 2006, "An/Moment" in 2012 and ”Fabrika/The Factory" in 2013.

In 2015, Arolat curated EAA's exhibition, "ist-on situations" at RIBA, London. The exhibition explored a timeline beginning with the mid-19th century showing key events or turning points in the course of the urban stories of London and Istanbul. Through a dual city approach, the practice reveals "situations" that unite and differentiate these two cities at the east and west ends of Europe in their development. Along with the visual material and text focusing on the background of the urban situations, a selection of recent projects and those underway by Emre Arolat Architecture (EAA) in Istanbul were showcased as 'agents' of the current urban scene. The exhibition featured original drawings, models, photographs and films of EAA's projects.

== Publication ==
EAA designs have been described in various publications. "Emre Arolat: Buildings / Projects 1998–2005" is the first monograph by Emre Arolat. It uses thirty projects to explore the studio's architectural approach. The book “Dalaman Airport” explores the experience of producing this large building. EAA was the editor of the books "Nazaran.../With regard to...” and ”Fabrika/The Factory", which was published alongside the exhibitions.

In September 2013, Rizzoli New York published "EAA - Emre Arolat Architects: Context and Plurality", a monograph edited by Philip Jodido and Suha Özkan, covering 34 projects of the office. It was the first Rizzoli book publication for a Turkish architect. The second volume of EAA-Emre Arolat Architecture's monograph with Rizzoli Electa, "Global and Local / New Projects: EAA-Emre Arolat Architecture" was published in 2020. The book highlights thirty-two projects across Turkey, the United Kingdom, Portugal, the United States, UAE, Bahamas, Republic of Tatarstan, Oman and Finland. The book contains multilayered and contextual projects like the award-winning Sancaklar Mosque and the innovative Istanbul Museum of Painting and Sculpture, which will historically document and display the largest collection of Turkish art and the Museum Hotel Antakya, in which the hotel floats over archeological artefacts without touching them.

In the same year, another book of EAA was released by ORO Editions with an introduction by Aaron Betsky. The book is an expose of an architect's inner dialogues during the design process. It reveals a detailed and extensive documentation of the internal struggle to conceptually ground and position three different works of architecture: Sancaklar Mosque, Bergama Cultural Center and Yalıkavak Marina.

== Books ==
- Scent of The Trace, Emre Arolat, Oro Editions (2020)
- Global and Local / New Projects: EAA-Emre Arolat Architecture, Philip Jodidio & Suha Özkan, Rizzoli Electa (2020)
- EAA - Emre Arolat Architecture / Context And Plurality, Philip Jodidio & Suha Özkan, Rizzoli NY (2013)
- Fabrika, Milli Reasürans A.Ş. (2012)
- Dalaman, Yem Yayınevi (2007)
- Nazaran, Milli Reasurans A.S. (2006)
- Emre Arolat, Buildings/Projects 1998–2005, Literatür (2005)

== Selected projects ==
Date	Type	Building	Location	Country
2002	Residential	Aomori Housing Complex	Aomori	Japan
2003	Hotel	Hotel in Mahdia	Mahdia	Tunisia
2003	Hotel	Lara Kervansaray Hotel and Convention Center	Antalya	Turkey
2004	Recreational	Minicity Theme Park	Antalya	Turkey
2005	Office	Tour & Taxis, Renovation of Antrepot Royal	Brussels	Belgium
2006	Transportation	Dalaman International Airport Terminal	Muğla	Turkey
2006	Industrial	Ipekyol Textile Factory	Edirne	Turkey
2007	Residential	Kemerlife XXI	Istanbul	Turkey
2008	Hotel	7800 Çeşme Residences and Hotel	İzmir	Turkey
2009	Residential	Folkart Narlidere Housing	İzmir	Turkey
2009	Museum	Santral Istanbul Contemporary Art Museum	Istanbul	Turkey
2010	Hotel	The Museum Hotel Antakya	Antakya	Turkey
2010	Residential	Arketip Housing	Istanbul	Turkey
2010	Cultural	Eyüp Cultural Center and Marriage Hall	Istanbul	Turkey
2011	Master Planning	Cendere Valley Master Planning	Istanbul	Turkey
2011	Transportation	Çukurova Regional Airport Complex	Adana	Turkey
2011	Cultural	Istanbul Museum of Painting and Sculpture	Istanbul	Turkey
2011	Government	Prague Turkish Embassy	Prague	Czech Republic
2011	Cultural	Raif Dinçkök Cultural Center	Yalova	Turkey
2012	Mixed Use	Baku Mixed Use Complex	Baku	Azerbaijan
2012	Hotel	Hotel in Batumi	Batumi	Georgia
2012	Office	Kağıthane Ofispark	Istanbul	Turkey
2012	Hotel	Le Meridien Istanbul	Istanbul	Turkey
2012	Education	METU Research Center	Ankara	Turkey
2012	Residential	Yalikavak Elements	Bodrum	Turkey
2013	Cultural	Expo Milano Turkish Pavilion	Milan	Italy
2013	Mixed Use	Kuzu Effect	Ankara	Turkey
2013	Religion	Sancaklar Mosque	Istanbul	Turkey
2013	Residential	Ulus Savoy Residences	Istanbul	Turkey
2013	Residential	Vicem Bodrum Houses	Muğla	Turkey
2014	Education	AGU Sümer Campus	Kayseri	Turkey
2014	Cultural	Guggenheim Helsinki Museum	Helsinki	Finland
2014	Mixed Use	Heyat Park Mixed Use Complex	Baku	Azerbaijan
2014	Office	Maslak No.1 Office Tower	Istanbul	Turkey
2014	Cultural	Udarnik Contemporary Art Museum	Moscow	Russia
2014	Leisure	Yalikavak Palmarina	Istanbul	Turkey
2014	Mixed Use	Zorlu Center Mixed Use Complex	Istanbul	Turkey
2015	Mixed Use	Gelendzhik Marina	Gelendzhik	Russia
2015	Government	Manisa Metropolitan Municipality Complex	Manisa	Turkey
2015	Office	Office Tower in Istanbul	Istanbul	Turkey
2015	Hotel	Rixos Abu Dhabi Resort Hotel	Dubai	UAE
2015	Hotel	Royalton Hotel and Residences	London	United Kingdom
2015	Hotel	St. Regis Istanbul	Istanbul	Turkey
2016	Cultural	Abdullah Gül Presidential Museum and Library	Kayseri	Turkey
2016	Residential	Bahamas Houses	Cat Cay	Bahamas
2016	Cultural	BerKM – Bergama Cultural Center	İzmir	Turkey
2016	Residential	Güral Suadiye Residences	Istanbul	Turkey
2016	Cultural	Liget Budapest Museum of Ethnography	Budapest	Hungary
2016	Residential	Muscat 1129 Commercial and Residential Complex	Muscat	Oman
2016	Residential	5975 Reading	London	United Kingdom
2017	Mixed Use	Ege Perla	İzmir	Turkey
2017	Residential	Golkoy Residences	Muğla	Turkey
2017	Residential	Kandilli Residences	Istanbul	Turkey
2017	Mixed Use	Kazan Mixed Use Complex	Kazan	Tatarstan
2017	Mixed Use	Mecidiyekoy Mixed Use Complex	Istanbul	Turkey
2017	Restaurant	Munya Restaurant Miami	Miami	United States
2017	Museum	Qatar Art Mill Competition	Doha	Qatar
2017	Mixed Use	Tehran Mixed Use Complex	Tehran	Iran
2018	Residential	Bay Point Villas	Miami	United States
2018	Cultural	Nora Cultural Center	Ajman	UAE
2018	Hotel	Savoy Hotel	Miami	United States
2018	Residential	Sabal Palm Road House	Miami	United States
2019	Commercial	Teknopark Istanbul	Istanbul	Turkey
2019	Residential	Alcantara Gardens	Lisbon	Portugal
2019	Residential	Riverside Central	London	United Kingdom
2019	Office	Nishat Office	Lahore	Pakistan
2019	Transportation	Sabiha Gökçen Airport International Terminal III Competition	Istanbul	Turkey
2019	Residential	Nef Gölköy	Bodrum	Turkey
2019	Residential	19 Jumeirah Palm Villa	Dubai	UAE
2019	R&D Center	CAFU Research Center	Sharjah	UAE
2020	Mixed Use	Lura 5 Hotel and Residences	Lalzit Bay	Albania
2020	Office	Göktekin Adana Mix	Adana	Turkey
