= Emlak Konut Mimar Sinan Anatolian High School =

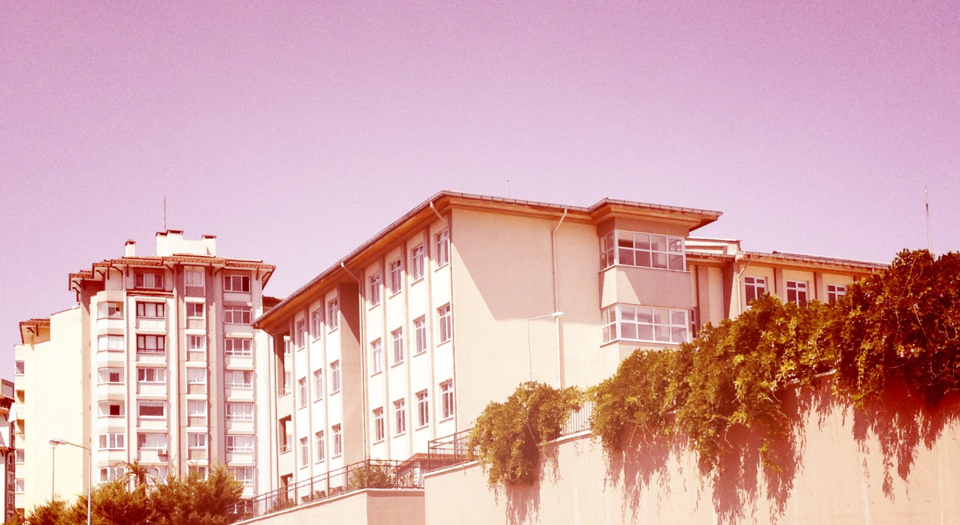
- South facade, August 2012

Location
- Büyükçekmece, Istanbul; Turkey
- 40°59′37″N 28°32′14″E

Information
- Type: Public
- Established: 2003
- Headmaster: Saim Eşmeoğlu
- Colors: Seal brown, baby blue and white
- Website: ekmal.meb.k12.tr

Emlak Konut Mimar Sinan Anatolian High School (Turkish: Emlak Konut Mimar Sinan Anadolu Lisesi, or EKMAL in short), is an Anatolian High School in Büyükçekmece, Istanbul, Turkey.

== See also ==
- List of schools in Istanbul
