= Sancaklar Mosque =

Mosque in Büyükçekmece, Istanbul, Turkey

- Sancaklar Camii
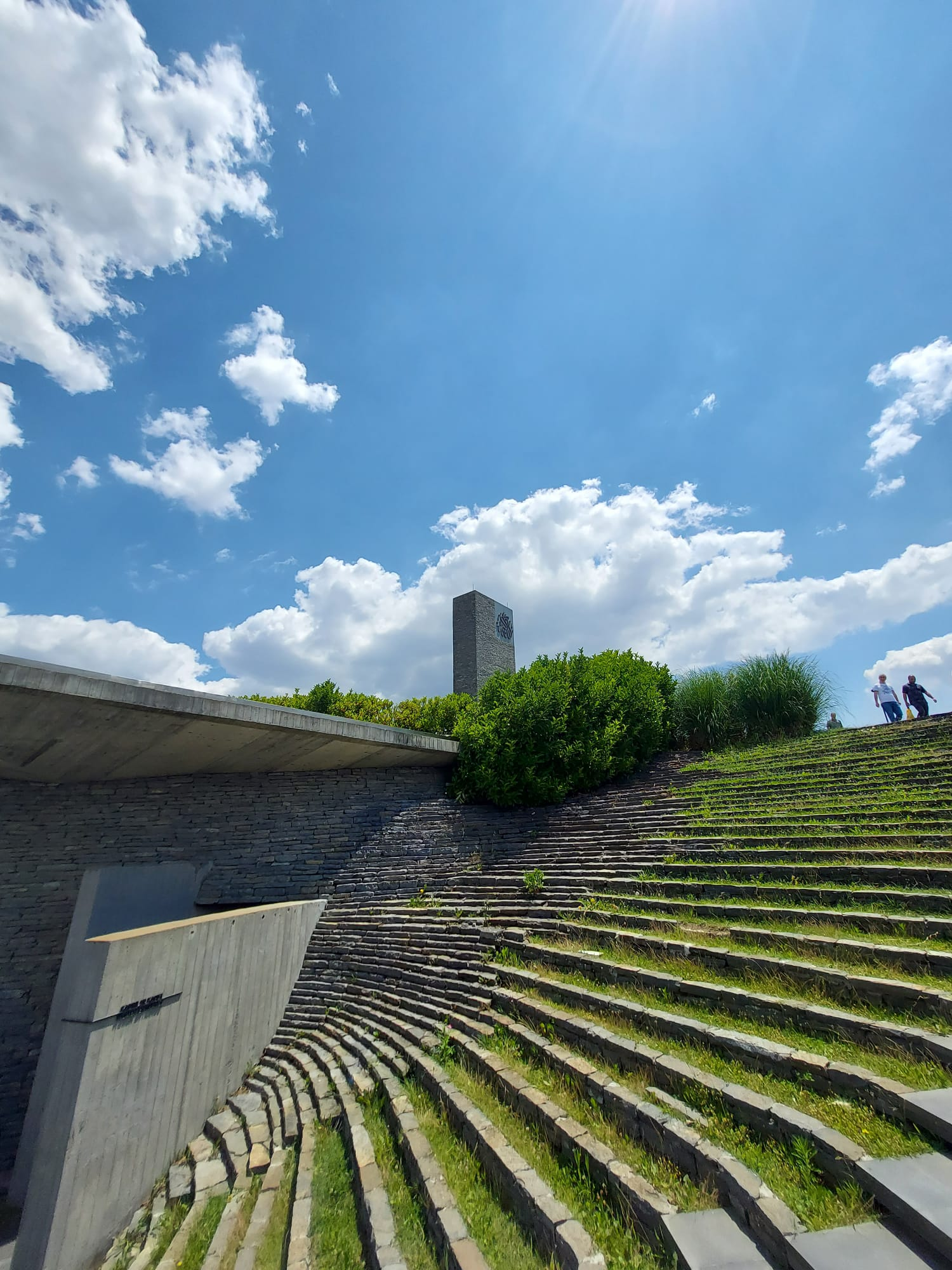

- Location within Istanbul

Religion
- Affiliation: Islam

Location
- Municipality: Büyükçekmece, Istanbul
- Country: Turkey
- Interactive map of Sancaklar Mosque
- Coordinates: 41.0890°N 28.6016°E

Architecture
- Architect: Emre Arolat
- Type: mosque
- Completed: 2012

Specifications
- Interior area: 700 m^{2}
- Site area: 1,300 m^{2}

The Sancaklar Mosque (Turkish: Sancaklar Camii) is a mosque in Büyükçekmece, Istanbul, Turkey. It was designed by architect Emre Arolat. It was conceived in response to the Sancaklar family's desire to construct a mosque in a location with views of Buyukcekmece Lake, within a neighborhood of gated communities. The mosque covers 700m^{2} on a 1300m^{2} site.

Finished in 2012, it received the 2015 Religious Building of the Year Award from ArchDaily. It also won the RIBA Award for International Excellence in 2018. In the BBC series Civilisations, classicist Mary Beard described it as "one of the most striking religious creations of modern times" and "one of the most startling mosques in the world".

== Architecture ==
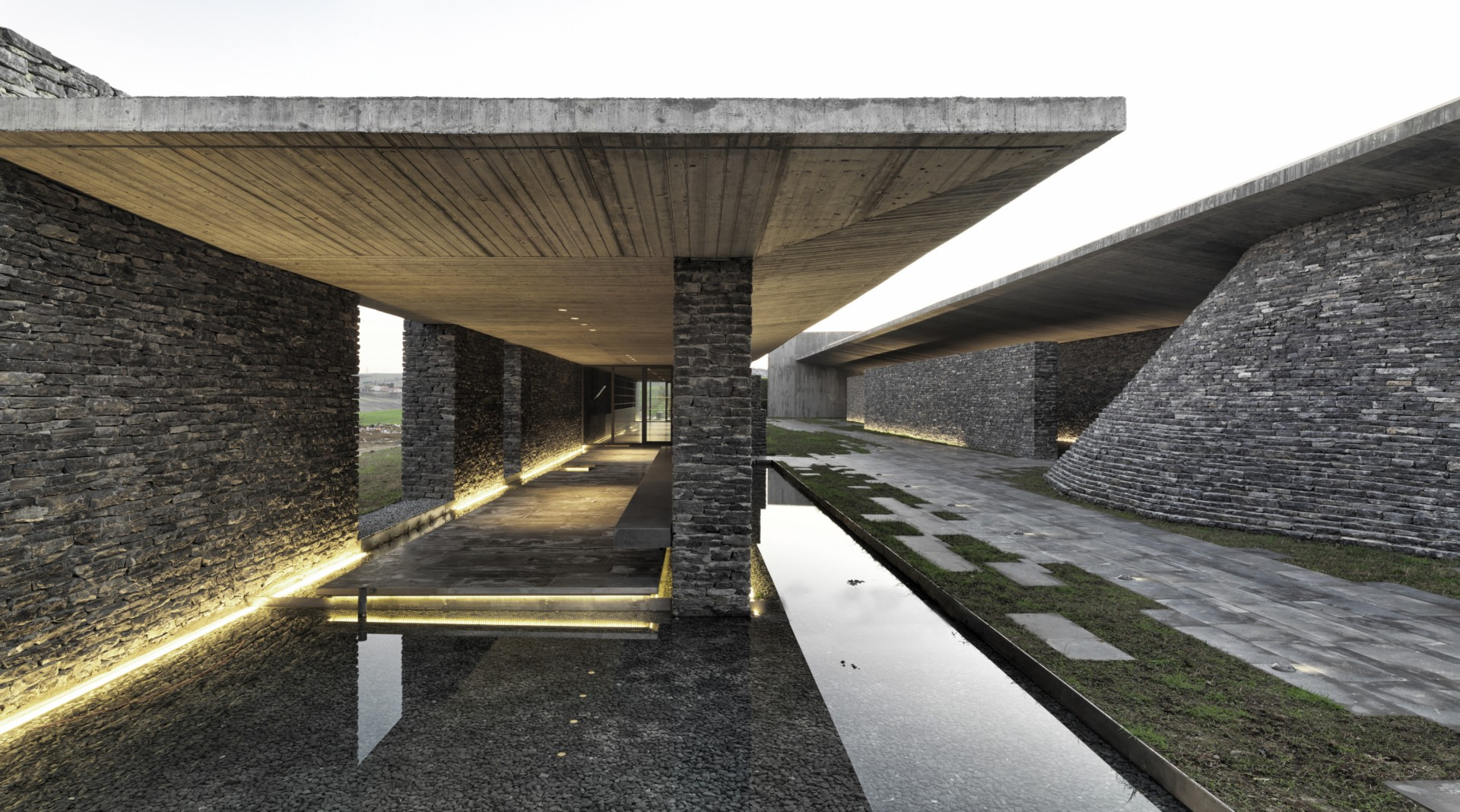

The main concern in Sancaklar Mosque is to create an architectural impression not at the conventional formal and stylistic levels, but at an emotional level, articulated through the considered use of materials, nature and light. The architects’ confrontation with the established tradition of mosque architecture through displacement, situates the mosque in the present context by emphasizing the experiential qualities of religious space rather than its organizational aspects. This project solely depends on the "essence" of a religious space, by focusing on the minimalist idea of a mosque rather than the classic Ottoman mosque forms. The displacements in the mosque reveal that its essential significance lies not in its familiarity with historical and customary formal elements, but in its attempt at defamiliarization. At the forefront of designing the mosque, physical and emotional pleasure were the principal focus, and this can be seen in the representation of the purest forms of light and matter.

=== Interior ===
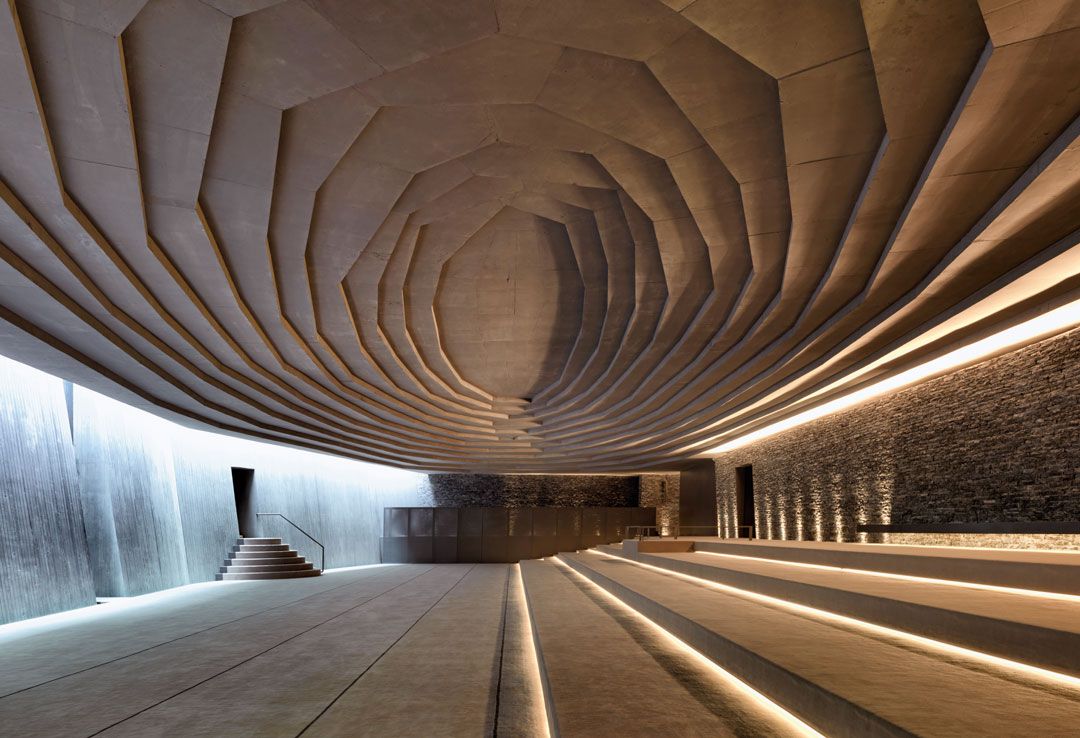

The interior of the mosque, a simple cave-like space. The idea of axiality as an essential characteristic of mosque interiors (particularly in classical Ottoman mosques with a centralized plan) is displaced in the Sancaklar Mosque. While ensuring linearity in the prayer area, the qibla wall does not allow for the dominance of any (transversal or longitudinal) direction or a hierarchy of any position. The qibla wall of Sancaklar Mosque deviates from a straight line and possesses a subtle break. This unconventional approach allows the wall to envelop the primary prayer area, while also drawing visual attention to the point where a change in direction is introduced. Typically, such emphasis would be conferred by a mihrab, a niche-like structure that serves as the focal point on the qibla wall. However, in this case, the mihrab takes the form of a narrow vertical recess that extends to the wall's height, with a barely noticeable alteration in the wall's angle occurring between the mihrab and the minbar.

This architectural illusion generates ambiguity in how one perceives and conceptualizes the qibla wall by disrupting the equilibrium between the mihrab and the minbar through a subtle change in direction. Consequently, the customary symbolic and standardized attributes associated with the qibla wall are effaced, shattering its rigidity and absolute nature as a directional object. While the wall still serves to indicate the qibla, its primary function becomes that of a pivotal spatial element, framing the liturgical components (minbar, mihrab, and minaret) and forging connections among them. By unifying these elements into a singular entity—the wall itself—it negates the predominance of any individual liturgical element over another.

The prayer hall itself embodies a captivating yet meditative atmosphere, with abundant natural light streaming down from the Qiblah—a curved wall of boardmarked concrete positioned to capture the falling light. Its striking contrast against the rugged stone walls and surrounding landscape serves as a clear indication of its unique significance. Within this wall, the Mihrab stands as a simple niche, accompanied by a minbar featuring semi-circular stone steps.

The layout questions conventions by placing the women and men next each other facing the qibla; however, they are separated physically and visually. Despite the absence of a dome, the rising contours in the ceiling subtly hint to one. The references to the past actually emphasize the mosque’s distance from that past, which is all too evident, for example, in the removal of the minaret and the transformation of the idea of a central dome.

=== Exterior ===
The mosque is enclosed on three sides, with only its north side and roof being visible; and second, the mosque becomes ‘an extended field’ that opens onto the view and expands into the natural landscape by adjusting itself to the slope.

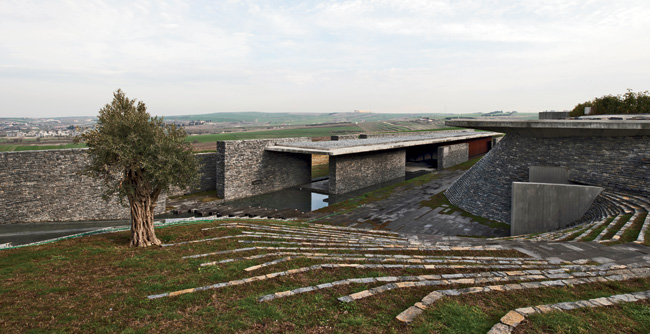

Entering the mosque, a courtyard leads to the prayer hall. The courtyard is defined on the outer side by a teahouse, communal space and library, which sits in a shallow pool of water, making the space a place for tranquility and calmness in preparation to the prayer hall entry.

The only indication of the building's existence from a distance is a modern interpretation of the minaret, while the prayer area is seamlessly integrated into the hill's slope. By adopting this approach, the architect avoids cultural limitations and debates surrounding architectural form. As visitors make their way towards the entrance, they descend through a rugged landscape adorned with irregular stone steps and untamed flowers. They pass by flowing water and navigate around a curved drystone wall, ultimately facing Mecca.

=== Minaret ===
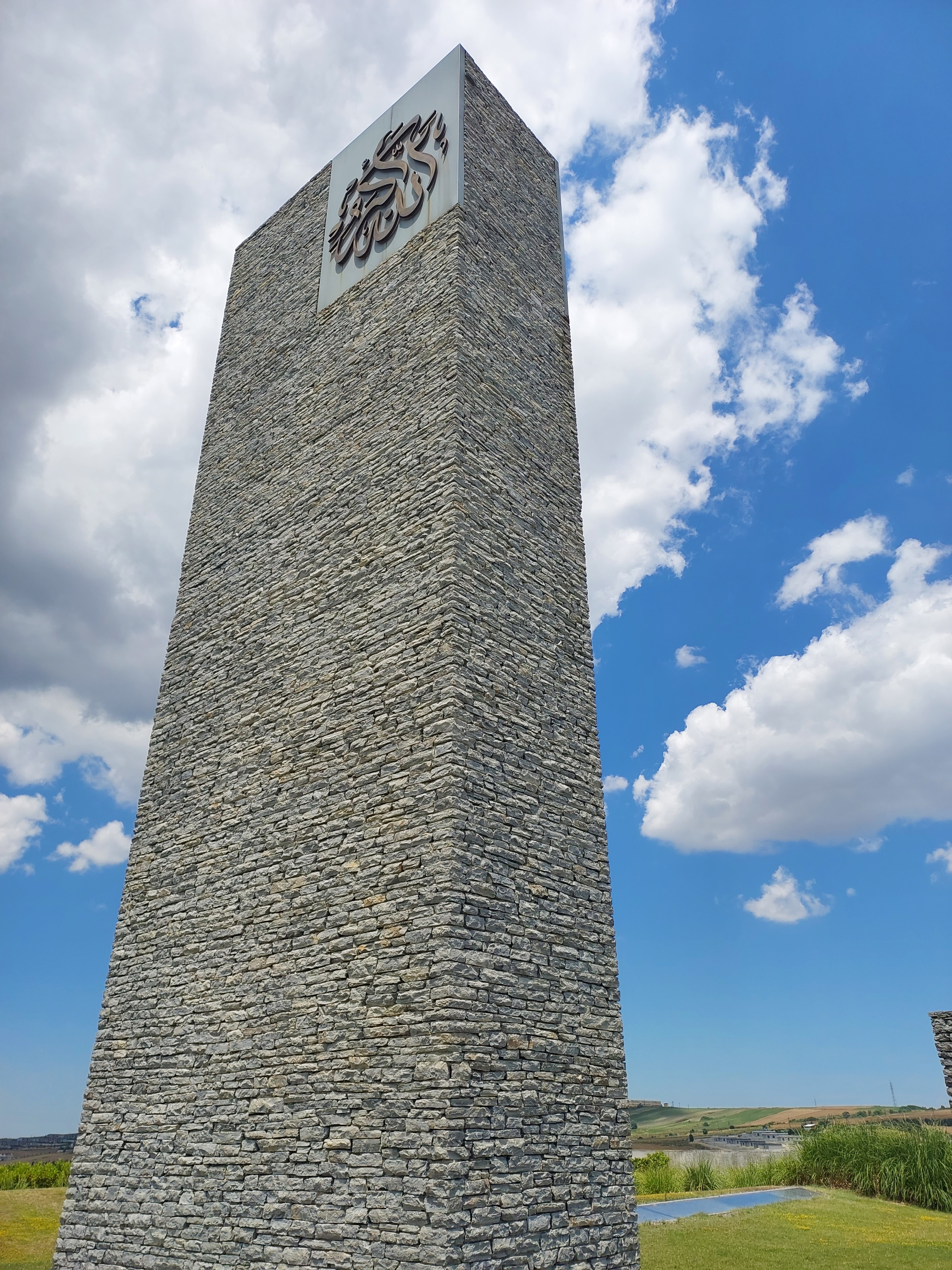
Minaret of Sancaklar Mosque

The minaret at Sancaklar Mosque takes the form of a tower, evoking the image of an observation tower rather than a traditional minaret. Some may criticize its presence for contradicting the overall approach of rejecting conventional mosque elements. However, its inclusion becomes justifiable when we consider how it effectively displaces familiarity.

As the sole prominently vertical element within the site, the minaret serves as a visible landmark from a distance, indicating a location without specifically signaling the presence of a mosque. Upon entering the site, the minaret, adorned with epigraphy on its wall, becomes the initial indication of the mosque's existence. Yet, its significance extends beyond its role as a mere sign; it actively contributes to various spatial experiences within the site.

Complementing a series of exterior walls, the minaret assumes a public role by welcoming and guiding individuals toward the prayer area. Despite the modest structure of Sancaklar Mosque, seemingly concealed within the natural landscape, the towering minaret asserts its individuality above the ground. This contradicts the perception of the mosque as being hidden and, instead, highlights the mosque's integration with the surrounding topography, emphasizing its extended field.

== See also ==
- List of mosques in Turkey
- Islamic architecture
