= Museum of World Costumes =

Museum in Büyükçekmece, Istanbul, Turkey

- Dünya Kostümleri Müzesi
- Location the museum in Istanbul
- Established: 2011; 15 years ago
- Location: Büyükçekmece, Istanbul, Turkey
- Coordinates: 41.014629°N 28.5616274°E
- Type: Folk costumes
- Collections: Clothing, accessories and related objects
- Founder: Büyükçekmece Municipality
- Owner: Büyükçekmece Municipality
- Website: www.bcekmece.bel.tr/dunya-kostum-merkezi

Museum of World Costumes (Turkish: Dünya Kostümleri Müzesi) is a museum of original folk clothing from various countries in Turkey. Established in July 2011, it is located in the Büyükçekmece district of Istanbul Province.

== History ==
The museum was established in a restored historic building situated at Çarşı St. 4 in the Mimar Sinan neighborhood of the Büyükçekmece district in Istanbul Province, supported by the municipality in July 2011. The original folk costumes, accessories and some related objects were donated by various foreign folk dance groups, who participated at the "International Culture and Art Festival" held annually in Büyükçekmece, which was four times awarded by the International Council of Organizations of Folklore Festivals and Folk Arts "Best Festival". The festival has been taking place since 2000, and since 2003 has been a member of the International Council of Organizations of Folklore Festivals, which is affiliated with UNESCO.

The museum holds costumes from 44 countries, including Spain, Uzbekistan, Malaysia, Thailand, Mexico, Russia, Ukraine, Poland, France, Venezuela, Ethiopia, Argentina, Algeria, Belarus, Philippines, Georgia, Indonesia and Azerbaijan. The oldest of the costumes on display is a wedding dress which is over 100 years old. The museum holds over 2000 exhibits, which are periodically rotated. The museum is spread over two floors, with the ground floor dedicated to world costumes, and the first floor dedicated to Turkish costumes.
