= Atirus Shopping Center =

- Atirus Alışveriş Merkezi
- Location: Büyükçekmece, Istanbul, Turkey
- Opened: December 17, 2005
- Developer: Kapıcıoğlu Co.
- Num. of stores: 80
- Num. of anchor tenants: 7
- Floor area: 56,000 m^{2} (600,000 sq ft) (total enclosed area)
- Floors: 3
- Website: atirus.com.tr

Atirus Shopping Center (Turkish: Atirus Alışveriş Merkezi), opened on December 17, 2005, is a shopping mall located in the suburban district of Büyükçekmece in Istanbul, Turkey. It is named after the location, which was called Atirus in the ancient times.

Constructed by Kapıcıoğlu Company, the earthquake-proof building cost ₺54 million (approx. $40 million as of 2005). It is situated on the busy highway D.100, which runs from Istanbul westwards through Büyükçekmece. The mall houses 80 stores, one Migros hypermarket and a food court with fast-food restaurants in an area of 56,000 m^{2} (600,000 sq ft) on three floors. There is also place for 63 offices. The parking lot has a capacity of 700 cars. Around 1,000 service people are employed in the property.

84 independent units of the shopping mall are owned by Kapıcıoğlu Co. while 66 units belong to the Büyükçekmece Municipality.
