= Lake Büyükçekmece =

- Büyükçekmece Gölü (Turkish)
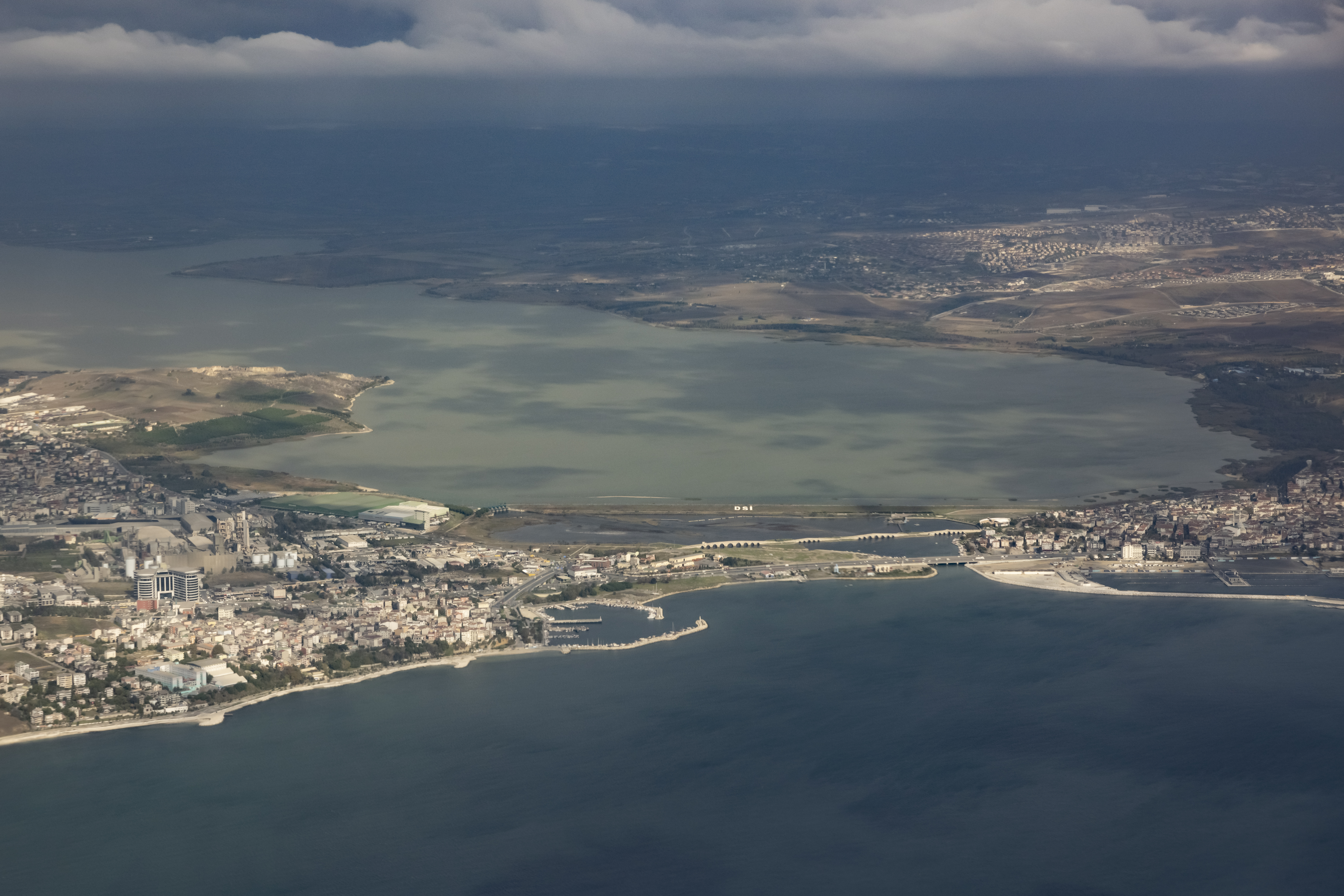
- Aerial view of the lake seen from the Sea of Marmara

- Location within Turkey
- Location: Istanbul Province
- Coordinates: 41°03′55″N 28°33′25″E
- Primary inflows: Karasudere
- Catchment area: 622 km^{2} (240 sq mi)
- Basin countries: Turkey
- Max. length: 7 km (4.3 mi)
- Max. width: 2 km (1.2 mi)
- Surface area: 28.47 km^{2} (10.99 sq mi)
- Max. depth: 8.6 m (28 ft)
- Water volume: 16,161 hm^{3} (3.877 cu mi)
- Islands: no
- Settlements: Büyükçekmece, Çatalca

Lake Büyükçekmece (Turkish: Büyükçekmece Gölü) is a liman formed at the point where the river Karasudere flows into the Marmara Sea. The lake is located south of the Çatalca district, west of Istanbul, Turkey. It is used as a freshwater reservoir.

The lake's bar was reinforced in 1988 by a dam. The area of the lake is 28.47 km^{2} (10.99 sq mi), and is 7 km (4.3 mi) long and 2 km (1.2 mi) wide. The maximum depth is 8.6 m (28 ft), following deepening carried out by the State Hydraulic Works.

The fluvial lake developed as the flow of Karasudere, and as it came downwards from Çatalca it was blocked off and formed by the resulting sandbank it created. A reedy, brackish salt-water lake exists between the Büyükçekmece Dam and the Marmara Sea. Another lagoon, Lake Küçükçekmece, is located around 12 km (7.5 mi) east of Lake Büyükçekmece.

The number of fish species observed in the lake has decreased from 30 in the past to 15 currently.

A historic 635 m (2,083 ft) long and 7.17 m (23.5 ft) wide multiple arch bridge, named after the Ottoman architect Mimar Sinan (1489-1588), spans the narrow opening at the bar connecting the lake to the sea.

At the northern shore of the lake, Istanbul Hezarfen Airfield is situated on a peninsula.

== Biology and status ==
The lake, which is not protected, was declared by BirdLife International as an Important Bird Area in 1989 for its numerous distinct and threatened waterfowl species.

== See also ==
- Büyükçekmece
- Büyükçekmece Dam
- Küçükçekmece
- Lake Küçükçekmece
