= Büyükçekmece =

- District and municipality
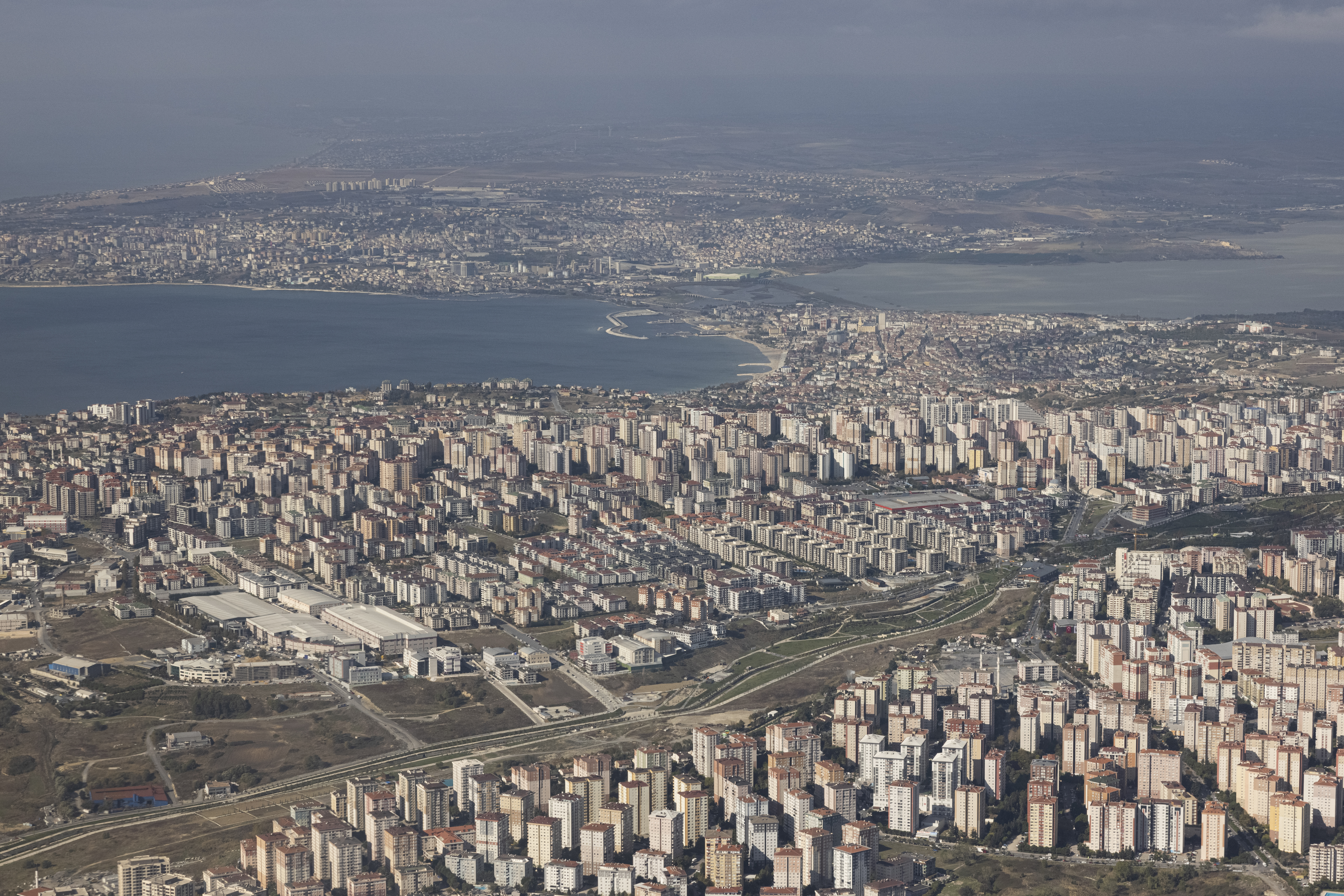
- Aerial view

- Logo

- Map showing Büyükçekmece District in Istanbul Province

- Location within Turkey Location within Istanbul
- Coordinates: 41°01′12″N 28°34′39″E
- Country: Turkey
- Province: Istanbul

Government
  - Mayor: Hasan Akgün (acting) (CHP)
  - Kaymakam: Sarı Müdür
- Area: 173 km^{2} (67 sq mi)
- Population (2022): 277,181
  - Density: 1,600/km^{2} (4,150/sq mi)
- Time zone: UTC+3 (TRT)
- Postal code: 34537
- Area code: 0212
- Website: www.bcekmece.bel.tr

Büyükçekmece, historically Athyras (Greek: Αθύρας), is a municipality and district of Istanbul Province, Turkey. Its area is 173 km^{2}, and its population is 277,181 (2022). It is on the Sea of Marmara coast of the European side, west of the city. It is largely an industrial area. The mayor is Hasan Akgün (CHP).

== History ==
The land around this inlet of the Sea of Marmara, has been settled, abandoned and resettled throughout history as army after army passed along the coast to the Bosphorus. It is thought to be the site of the Greek colony on the Marmara shore called Athyras (Άθυρας). In 443 AD, the armies of Attila the Hun took this settlement and its associated fort, and this was presumably his last conquest of that campaign before turning around. The earliest mention of the bishopric of Athyra in a list of dioceses is of the late 15th century, but a seal has been found of a 10th-century Bishop Orestes of the see. No longer a residential bishopric, Athyra is today listed by the Catholic Church as a titular see. The Ottoman architect Mimar Sinan built a bridge to cross the mouth of the inlet (Lake Büyükçekmece) and there are ruins of inns and caravansarai, which show this was a stopping place on the road to Europe. At the beginning of the Ottoman period, it was empty forest and farmland, and has gradually been settled by Turkish people migrating in from the Balkans and the Caucasus. According to the Ottoman population statistics of 1914, the kaza of Büyükçekmece had a total population of 13,121, consisting of 9,511 Greeks, 3,255 Muslims, 195 Bulgarians, 143 Roma people and 17 Armenians. In the early years of the Turkish Republic, it was still very rural, with village cottages, farmland behind, and by the sea the odd weekend home for people of Istanbul. The area was a very popular day or weekend trip from the city, there is a sandy shoreline, a long seafront and until the 1970s families would come out to Büyükçekmece for fishing, crabbing or for a day on the beach.

== Composition ==
There are 24 neighbourhoods in Büyükçekmece District:

- 19 Mayıs
- Ahmediye
- Alkent 2000
- Atatürk
- Bahçelievler
- Çakmaklı
- Celaliye
- Cumhuriyet
- Dizdariye
- Ekinoba
- Fatih
- Güzelce
- Hürriyet
- Kamiloba
- Karaağaç
- Kumburgaz
- Mimaroba
- Mimarsinan
- Murat Çesme
- Pınartepe
- Sinanoba
- Türkoba
- Ulus
- Yenimahalle

== Büyükçekmece today ==
The area administered by Büyükçekmece includes a large hinterland behind the Marmara shore, some of it still rural. Lake Büyükçekmece was connected to the sea until it was separated by a dam to supply fresh water to Istanbul. The Mimar Sinan Bridge is located in this area.

== Places of interest ==
- Kanuni Sultan Suleiman bridge
- Museum of World Costumes
- Sancaklar Mosque

== Notable buildings ==
- Kanuni Sultan Suleiman bridge (1567)
- Sancaklar Mosque (2012)

== Education ==
- Emlak Konut Mimar Sinan Anatolian High School
- Istanbul International Community School Marmara Campus
- Beykent University Büyükçekmece Campus

== Twinned towns ==
- Gelsenkirchen, Germany (since 2004)
- Kranj, Slovenia (since 2014)
- Struga, North Macedonia (since 2015)
- Gorna Oryahovitsa, Bulgaria (since 2003)
- Mamuša, Kosovo (since 2008)
- Nea Propontida, Greece (since 2008)
- Cheonan, Republic of Korea (since 2013)
- Dolyna, Ukraine (since 2022)
- Óbuda-Békásmegyer, Hungary (since 2022)
- İskele, Northern Cyprus (since 2003)
- Değirmenlik, Northern Cyprus (since 2003)
- Güzelyurt, Northern Cyprus (since 2003)
- Lapta, Northern Cyprus (since 2003)

== Sports ==
Büyükçekmece Basketbol is a professional basketball team playing in the highest national division, where's Büyükçekmece Tepecikspor is a sports club best known for its football team.

== Gallery ==
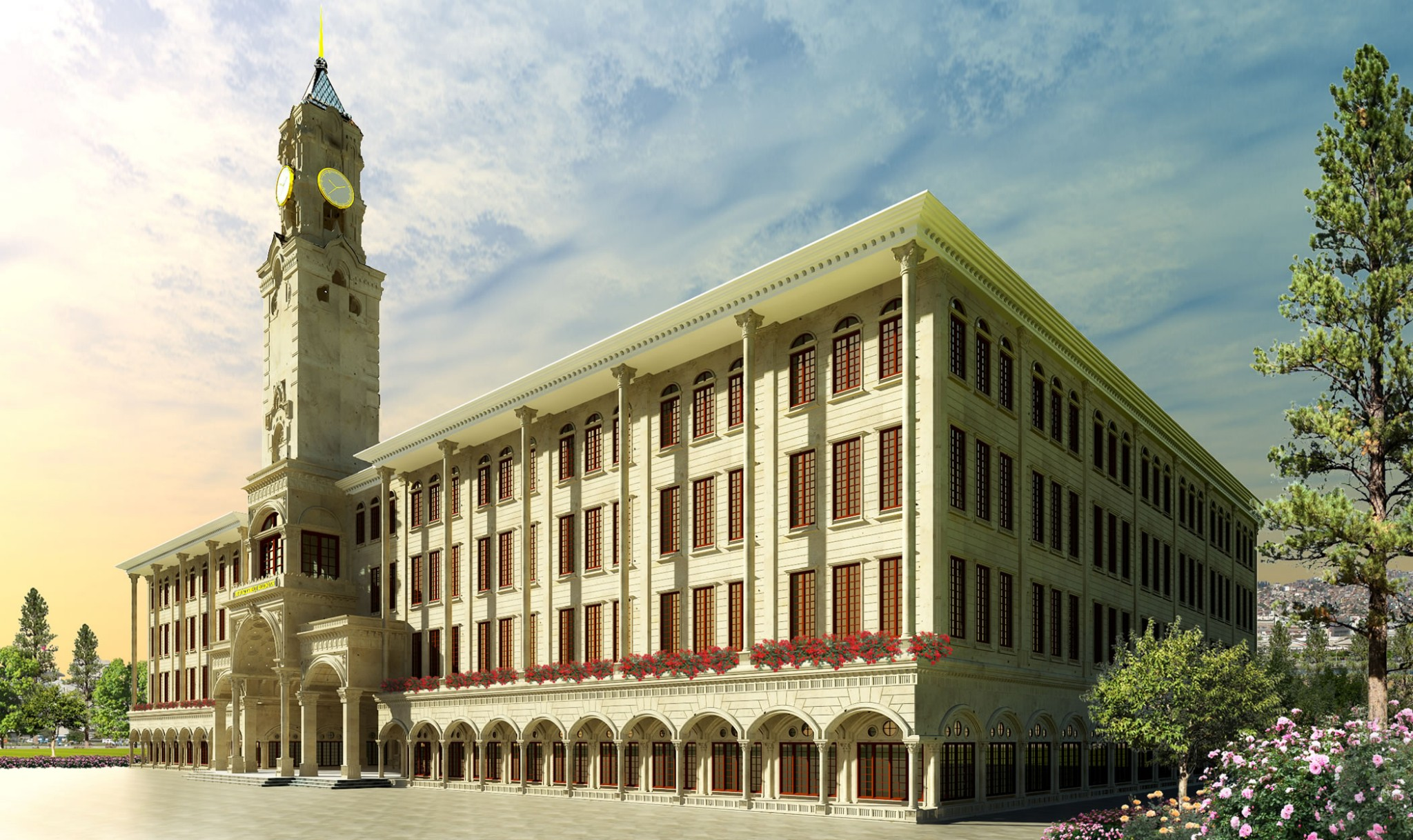
Büyükçekmece New Municipality Building

== See also ==
- Atirus Shopping Center
- Küçükçekmece
