= Mescit =

Small mosque building

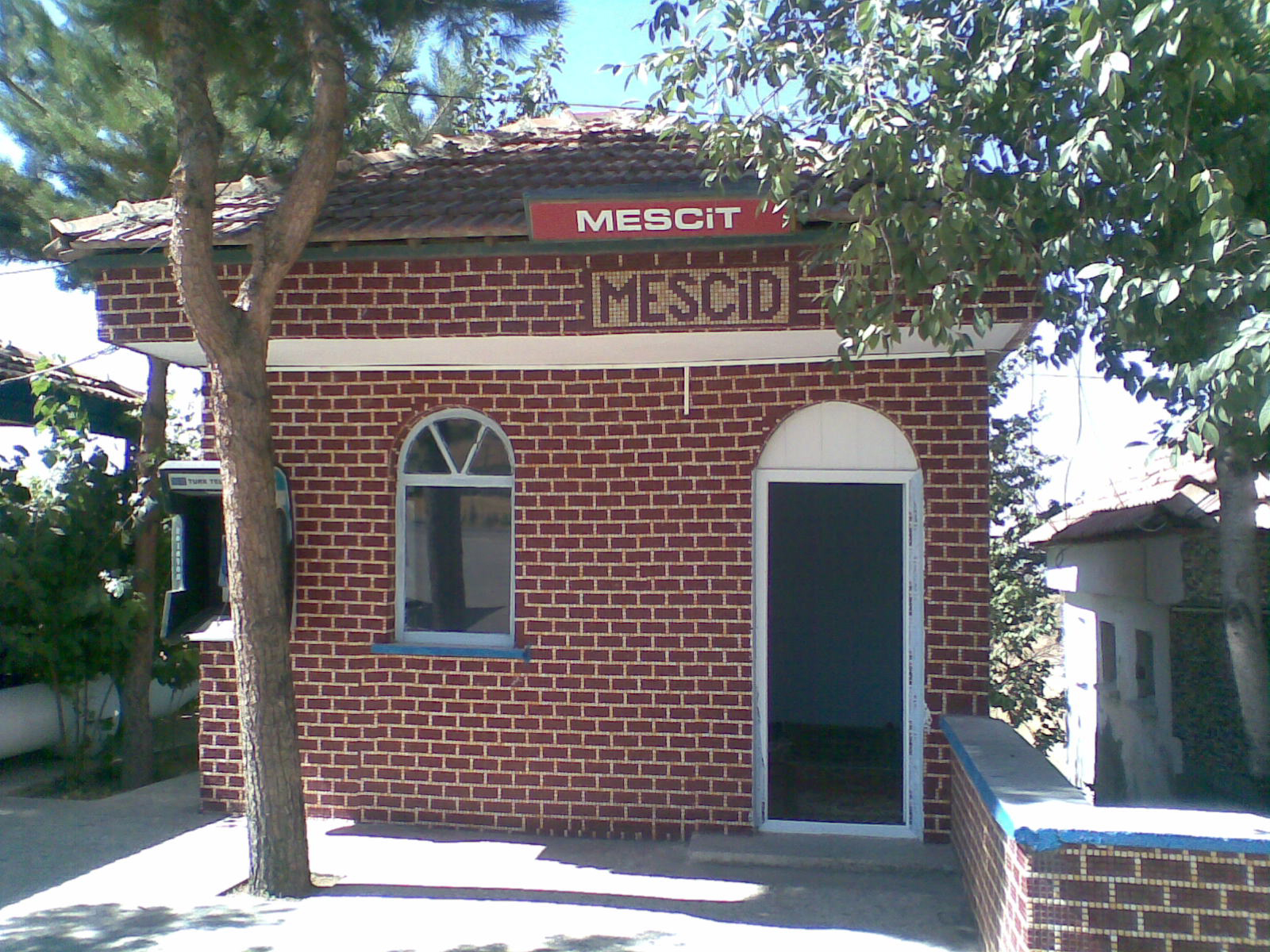
A mescit in Malatya

Mescit (Arabic: مسجد, romanized: masjid, Turkish: mescit), also known as small mosque, is a small Muslim prayer space or mosque, typically used for daily prayers rather than large congregational gatherings such as the Friday (Jumu'ah) or Eid prayers. In Turkish usage, a mescit is smaller than a cami (mosque) and usually does not have a minbar (pulpit) or minaret.

In many institutions such as schools, offices, or public buildings, mescits serve as designated rooms for Muslims to perform the five daily prayers. Historically, small mescits were also built in marketplaces, caravanserais, and fortresses throughout the Ottoman Empire.

== Literature ==
- Mescit. In: Klaus Kreiser: Small Encyclopedia of Turkey. Interesting facts about the country and its people (Beck'sche Reihe 838 Current Country Studies). Beck, Munich 1992, ISBN 3-406-33184-X, p. 107.
