= Kanuni Sultan Suleiman bridge (Istanbul) =

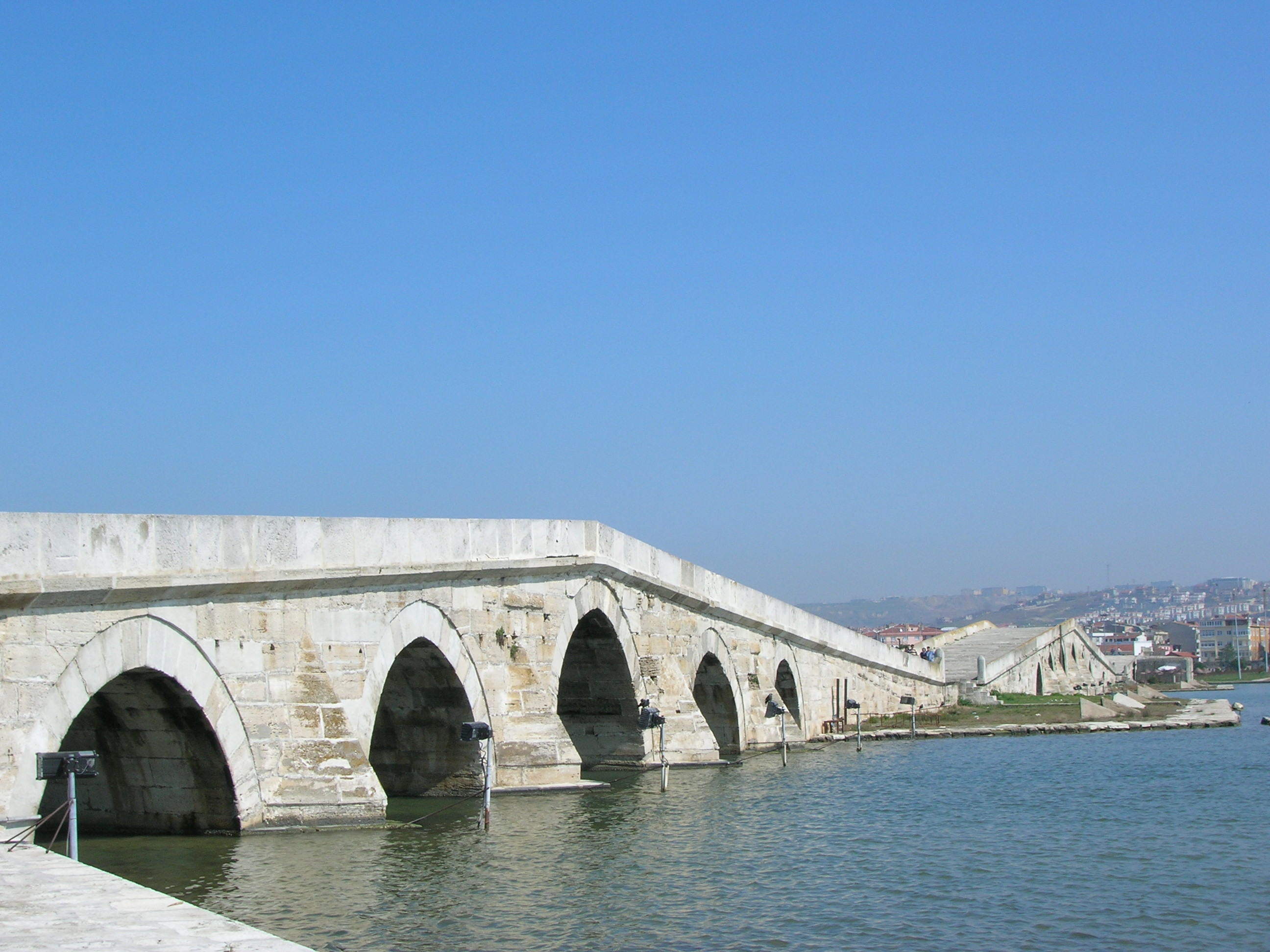
- Coordinates: 41.021944°N 28.570556°E
- Crosses: Lake Büyükçekmece
- Official name: Kanuni Sultan Süleyman Köprüsü

Characteristics
- Total length: 636 m (2,087 ft)
- Width: 7.17 m (23.5 ft)
- No. of spans: 28

History
- Construction start: 1566
- Opened: 1567; 458 years ago

The Kanuni Sultan Suleiman bridge (Turkish: Kanuni Sultan Süleyman Köprüsü), also known as Büyükçekmece Bridge, is a stone arch bridge located in Büyükçekmece, 36 km (22 mi) west of the center of Istanbul, Turkey, on the European side of the Bosphorus.

The bridge was built during the Ottoman period by chief architect Mimar Sinan (c. 1488/1490–1588), across the mouth of the large but shallow inlet known as Lake Büyükçekmece. Construction started in 1566 and the bridge opened in 1567. During construction it is reported that the water was pumped out of Lake Büyükçekmece, and 40,000 m^{3} (1,400,000 cu ft) of stones were set in place.

The bridge comprises 28 spans and is divided into four sections by the presence of three shallow islets along its length. Its role serving large volumes of traffic as a communications artery has been taken over by a wide modern road bridge on its seaward side, but the sixteenth-century bridge is promoted for its symbolic and historic resonances. Between 1986 and 1989 it was restored at considerable cost.
