= List of media during the Turkish War of Independence =

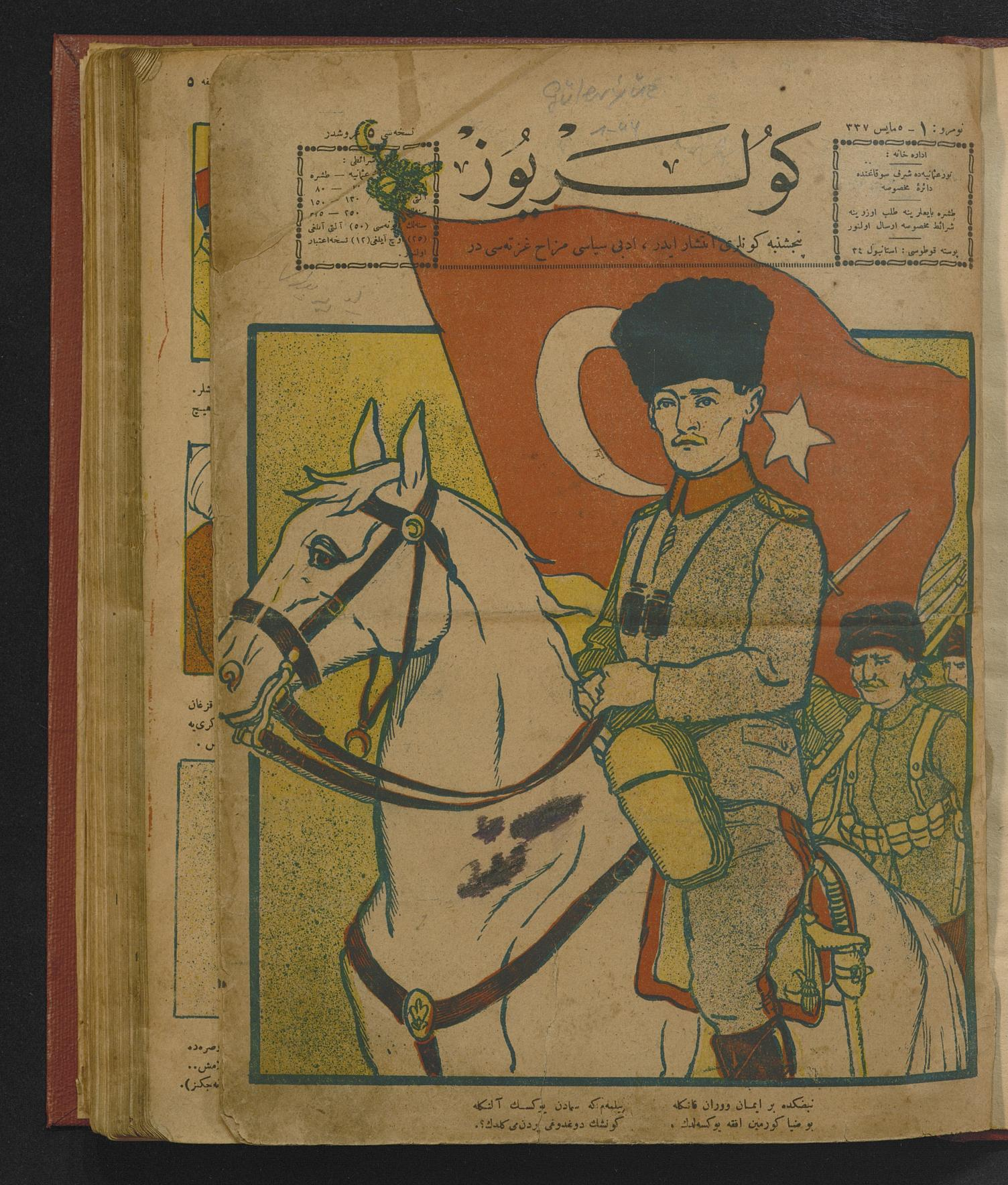
First page of the magazine Güleryüz, an example of magazines that supported the Turkish National Movement

Media during the Turkish War of Independence refers to the political attitudes of newspapers and magazines that were published in Anatolia and Constantinople during the Turkish War of Independence between the Armistice of Mudros (1919) and the Treaty of Lausanne (1923).

== Background ==
After the World War I, the Ottoman Empire was partitioned by the Entente. The Turkish National Movement in Anatolia culminated in the formation of the Grand National Assembly (GNA; Turkish: Büyük Millet Meclisi [BMM]) by Mustafa Kemal Atatürk and his colleagues. After the end of the Turkish–Armenian, Franco-Turkish and Greco-Turkish fronts (often referred to as the Eastern Front, the Southern Front, and the Western Front of the war, respectively), the Treaty of Sèvres was abandoned and the Treaties of Kars (October 1921) and Lausanne (July 1923) were signed. The Allies left Anatolia and Eastern Thrace, and the Grand National Assembly of Turkey (which remains Turkey's primary legislative body today) declared the Republic of Turkey on 29 October 1923.

During this period, an important amount of newspapers and magazines published in region supported the Turkish National Movement. Initially, because of the occupation of city, the mass media in Istanbul was unable to write subjects such as Mustafa Kemal Atatürk, Kuva-yi Milliye, War of Independence and Grand National Assembly of Turkey. Some newspapers even openly supported the occupation by trying to convince the people to not resist. There were also many newspapers and magazines owned by minorities who mostly supported a mandate rule over Anatolia and named Kuva-yi Milliye "irresponsible gangs".

== List ==
=== Media that was in support of the Turkish National Movement ===
==== Constantinople ====
Name	Center	Type	Frequency	Notes
Ahvâl	Constantinople	Newspaper	Irregular	
Akbaba	Constantinople	Newspaper	Twice per week	
Akşam	Constantinople	Newspaper	Daily	Formed by Necmettin Sadak and Ali Naci
Alay	Constantinople	Newspaper	Weekly	Formed by Ercüment Ekrem Talu and Aka Gündüz
Asildar	Constantinople	Newspaper	Daily	
Asker Hocası	Constantinople	Newspaper	Biweekly	
Aydede	Constantinople	Newspaper	Weekly	
Âyine	Constantinople	Magazine		
Aydınlık	Constantinople	Newspaper	Weekly	
Beşer ve Tabiat	Constantinople	Newspaper	Weekly	
Bugün	Constantinople	Newspaper	Monthly	
Büyük Mecmua	Constantinople	Magazine	Biweekly	
Cadı	Constantinople	Newspaper	Twice per week	
Ceride-i Havadis	Constantinople	Newspaper	Daily	
Ceride-i Şikâyât	Constantinople	Newspaper	Weekly	
Dergâh	Constantinople	Magazine	Biweekly	
Dersaadet	Constantinople	Newspaper	Daily	
Diken	Constantinople	Newspaper	Weekly	
Edebî Mecmua	Constantinople	Magazine	Weekly	
Efkâr-ı Umumiye	Constantinople	Newspaper	Biweekly	
Fırtına	Constantinople	Newspaper	Weekly	
Güleryüz	Constantinople	Newspaper	Weekly	Launched by Sedat Simavi
Habl-i Metin	Constantinople	Magazine		
Hâdisât	Constantinople	Newspaper	Daily	
Halk Sadâsı	Constantinople	Newspaper	Daily	
Hukuk-ı Beşer	Constantinople	Newspaper	Daily	
İdrâk	Constantinople	Newspaper	Daily	
İfhâm	Constantinople	Newspaper	Daily	
İkdam	Constantinople	Newspaper	Everyday	Established by Yakup Kadri Karaosmanoğlu, Hüseyin Cahit (Yalçın) and Hüseyin Rahmi
İleri	Constantinople	Newspaper	Daily	Established by Celal Nuri İleri
İstiklâl	Constantinople	Newspaper	Irregular	
Karagöz	Constantinople	Magazine	Biweekly	It published 4785 issues between the Second Constitutional Era and 1955 and supported the Turkish National Movement.
Memleket	Constantinople	Newspaper	Daily	
Millî Mecmua	Constantinople	Magazine	Biweekly	
Minber	Constantinople	Newspaper	Daily	
Müşterek Newspaper	Constantinople	Newspaper	Daily	
Resimli Newspaper	Constantinople	Newspaper	Weekly	
Sebilürreşad	Istanbul-Kayseri-Ankara	Constantinople	Irregular	Established by Mehmet Akif (Ersoy)
Servet-i Fünun	Constantinople	Newspaper-Magazine	Weekly	
Tanin	Constantinople	Newspaper	Daily	Formed by Hüseyin Cahit
Tercüman-ı Hakikat	Constantinople	Newspaper	Everyday	
Tevhid-i Efkâr (Tasvîr-i Efkâr)	Constantinople	Newspaper	Daily	
Türk Dünyası	Constantinople	Newspaper	Weekly	
Vakit	Constantinople	Newspaper	Daily	Established by Ahmet Emin Yalman and Mehmet Asım Us
Vatan	Constantinople	Newspaper	Daily	
Yarın	Constantinople	Magazine	Weekly	
Yeni Mecmua	Constantinople	Magazine	Weekly	

==== Anatolia ====
Name	Center	Type	Frequency	Notes
Ferda	Adana	Newspaper	Twice every week	
Hayat	Adana	Newspaper	Thrice every week	
Millî Mefkure	Adana	Magazine	Once every 15 days	
Tok Söz	Adana	Newspaper	Everyday	
Adapazarı	Adapazarı	Newspaper	Once every week	
Afyon'da Nur	Afyonkarahisar	Magazine	Once every month	
İkâz	Afyonkarahisar	Newspaper	Everyday	
Söz Birliği	Afyonkarahisar	Newspaper	Irregular	
Amasya'da Emel	Amasya	Newspaper	Once every week	
Ana Türk Yurdu	Ankara	Magazine	Once every 15 days	
Anadolu Duygusu	Ankara	Magazine	Once every 15 days	
Anadolu Terbiye Mecmuası	Ankara	Magazine	Once every month	
Anadolu'da Peyâm-ı Sabah	Ankara	Newspaper	Once every week	
Anadolu'da Yeni Gün	Ankara	Newspaper	Everyday	It was later renamed to Cumhuriyet
Anavatan Mecmuası	Ankara	Magazine	Once every 15 days	
Bozkurt	Ankara	Magazine	Once every week	
Hakimiyet-i Milliye	Ankara	Newspaper	Everyday	Established by Atatürk in 1920. It was the semi-official newspaper of TBMM. It was renamed Ulus in 1934. The first editor was Ahmet Ağaoğlu.
Kavânîn Mecmuası	Ankara	Magazine	Irregular	
Mefkure	Ankara	Magazine	Once every week	
Millî Ordu	Ankara	Magazine	Once every month	
Şark'ın Sesi	Ankara	Newspaper	Everyday	
Anadolu'da Kalem	Ankara	Newspaper	Once every week	
Yeşil Yuva	Ardahan	Magazine	Once every month	
Aydın İli	Aydın	Newspaper	Once every two days	
Doğru Söz	Balıkesir	Newspaper	Once every week	
İzmir'e Doğru	Balıkesir	Newspaper	Twice every week	
Zafer-i Millî	Balıkesir	Newspaper	Thrice every week	
Dertli	Bolu	Newspaper	Once every week	
Gamlı	Bolu	Magazine	Once every week	
Millî Gaye	Bolu	Magazine	Once every 15 days	
Türkoğlu	Bolu	Newspaper	Irregular	
Arkadaş	Bursa	Newspaper	Irregular	
Bursa Mecmuası	Bursa	Magazine	Once every 15 days	
Ertuğrul	Bursa	Newspaper	Once every week	
Hakikat	Bursa	Newspaper	Thrice every week	
İntibah	Bursa	Newspaper	Everyday	
Kardeş	Bursa	Newspaper	Once every week	
Millet Yolu	Bursa	Newspaper	Twice every week	
Peyâm-ı Sabah	Bursa			Published a single issue
Halk Yolu	Çankırı	Magazine	Once every 15 days	
Nazikter	Daday	Newspaper	Once every week	
Küçük Mecmua	Diyarbakır	Magazine	Once every week	
Arda	Edirne	Newspaper	Twice every week	
İtilâf	Edirne	Newspaper	Everyday	
Paşaeli-Trakya	Edirne	Newspaper	Once every week	
Satvet-i Milliyye	Elazığ	Newspaper	Once every week	
Albayrak	Erzurum	Newspaper	Twice every week	
Ahrar	Eskişehir	Newspaper	Once every week	
Hatif	Eskişehir	Newspaper	Irregular	
İmdad	Eskişehir	Newspaper	Irregular	
İstiklâl	Eskişehir	Newspaper	Once every week	
Metanet	Eskişehir	Newspaper	Irregular	
Gedikkaya	Giresun	Newspaper	Once every week	
Işık	Giresun	Magazine	Once every 15 days	
Karadeniz	Giresun	Newspaper	Once every week	
Yeni Giresun	Giresun	Newspaper	Thrice every week	
Güzel İnebolu	İnebolu	Newspaper	Once every week	
	İnebolu			
Ahenk	İzmir	Newspaper	Everyday	
Akdeniz	İzmir	Newspaper	Once every week	
Anadolu	İzmir	Newspaper	Everyday	
Antalya'da Anadolu	İzmir	Newspaper	Everyday	
Cumartesi	İzmir	Newspaper	Once every week	
Efe	İzmir	Newspaper	Irregular	
Halka Doğru Mecmuası	İzmir	Magazine	Once every 15 days	
Hilâl	İzmir	Newspaper	Everyday	
Hukuk-ı Beşer	İzmir	Newspaper	Everyday	
Islahat	İzmir	Newspaper	Everyday	
Sulh ve Selâmet	İzmir	Newspaper	Everyday	
Şark	İzmir	Newspaper	Everyday	
Yeni İzmir	İzmir	Magazine	Once every 15 days	
Açıksöz	Kastamonu	Newspaper	Everyday	
Gençlik	Kastamonu	Magazine	Once every 15 days	
Kastamonu	Kastamonu	Newspaper	Once every week	
Kayseri Gazetesi	Kayseri	Newspaper	Once every week	
Misâk-ı Millî	Kayseri	Newspaper	Everyday	
Babalık	Konya	Newspaper	Twice every week	
Hak Yolu	Konya	Magazine	Once every 10 days	
Halk	Konya	Newspaper	Everyday	
İntibah	Konya	Newspaper	6 times every week	
Öğüt	Konya	Newspaper	Everyday	
Wilson	Manisa	Newspaper	Irregular	
Amâl-i Milliye	Kahramanmaraş	Newspaper	Twice every week	
Tecelli	Merzifon	Newspaper	Once every 15 days	
Menteşe	Muğla	Newspaper	Twice every week	
Azim	Ordu	Newspaper	Twice every week	
Güneş	Ordu	Magazine	Once every 15 days	
Muvaffakiyet-i Milliyye	Ordu	Newspaper	Twice every week	
Ordu Bucak	Ordu	Newspaper	Twice every week	
Yeni Adana	Pozantı	Newspaper	Everyday	
Ahâli	Samsun	Newspaper	Irregular	
Aks-i Sadâ	Samsun	Newspaper	Thrice every week	
Fırtına	Samsun	Newspaper	Once every week	
Hayat	Samsun	Newspaper	Everyday	
Samsun'da Hilâl	Samsun	Newspaper	Twice every week	
Varlık	Sarıkamış	Newspaper	Twice every week	
Birlik	Sivas	Newspaper	Once every week	
Dilek	Sivas	Newspaper	Once every 15 days	
Gaye-i Milliye	Sivas	Newspaper	Everyday	
İrâde-i Milliye	Sivas	Newspaper	Everyday	
Fecir	Trabzon	Magazine	Once every 15 days	
Güzel Trabzon	Trabzon	Newspaper	Thrice every week	
Hak	Trabzon	Newspaper	Irregular	
İkbâl	Trabzon	Newspaper	Twice every week	
İstikbal	Trabzon	Newspaper	Twice every week	
Zafer	Trabzon	Magazine	Once every week	

==== Other ====
Name	Center	Type	Frequency	Notes
Azerbaycan	Baku	Newspaper	Irregular	
Sadâ-i Millet	Batumi	Newspaper	Thrice every week	
Kızıl Şark	Moscow	Magazine	Once every month	
Nefir	Thessaloniki	Newspaper	Once every week	
Ahâli	Sofia	Newspaper	Once every other day	

=== Media that opposed the Turkish National Movement ===
==== Constantinople ====
Name	Center	Type	Frequency	Notes
Alemdar	Constantinople	Newspaper		It was published between 1909 and 1922. Supported British occupation. It was formed by Refi Cevat Ulunay and Rıza Tevfik Bölükbaşı
Peyam-ı Sabah	Constantinople	Newspaper		It was published between 1913 and 1922, when it was abolished by the Grand National Assembly of Turkey. The main writer of newspaper was Ali Kemal, and the newspaper was known for supporting British occupation.
Istanbul	Constantinople	Newspaper		
Ümit	Constantinople	Magazine		Formed by Refik Halit Karay

==== Anatolia ====
Name	Center	Type	Frequency	Notes
Ferda	Adana			It was published between 1918 and 1921. Supported the French occupation.
Adana Postası	Adana	Newspaper	Everyday	The newspaper was abolished when the French left the region.
Rehber	Adana	Newspaper	Once every week	Financed by the French.
Selamet	Trabzon			
İrşat	Balıkesir			
Köylü	İzmir			Supported the Greek occupation
Zafer	Kastamonu			Supported the Ottoman Empire in Istanbul

=== Minorities ===
==== Constantinople ====
Name	Center	Type	Frequency	Notes
Pontos	Constantinople	Newspaper		Greek newspaper. Supported an independent Pontus.
Rönesans	Constantinople	Newspaper		Armenian newspaper. Supported the Allied occupation, and it was known for calling the Kuva-yi Milliye "irresponsible gangs"
Journal d'Orient	Constantinople	Newspaper		Jewish newspaper. Did not support a specific occupation, but stated that it would accept any rule, as long as Jews had minority rights.

==== Anatolia ====
Name	Center	Type	Frequency	Notes
Telgrafos	İzmir	Newspaper		Greek newspaper. Supported Greek rule over Aidin Vilayet.
Patris	İzmir	Newspaper		Greek newspaper. Supported Greek rule over Aidin Vilayet.
Amolthia Kozmoz	İzmir	Newspaper		Greek newspaper. Supported Greek rule over Aidin Vilayet.
Estia	İzmir	Newspaper		Greek newspaper. Supported Greek rule over Aidin Vilayet.
Epota	Trabzon	Newspaper		Greek newspaper.
Pharos İanadolis	Trabzon	Newspaper		Greek newspaper.
Toros	Adana	Newspaper		Armenian newspaper.
Kilikya	Adana	Newspaper		Armenian newspaper.
Hayistan	Adana	Newspaper		Armenian newspaper.
Azadamard	Adana	Newspaper		Armenian newspaper.
Adana	Adana	Newspaper		Armenian owned newspaper. It was written in Turkish with an Armenian alphabet.
Davros	Adana	Newspaper		Armenian newspaper.
Haygagan Tsayn	Adana	Newspaper		Armenian newspaper.
Art	Adana	Newspaper		Armenian newspaper.
Sakank	Adana	Newspaper		Armenian newspaper.
Ararat	Adana	Newspaper		Armenian newspaper.
Nor Aşharn	Adana	Newspaper		Armenian newspaper.
Kilikya Surhantay	Adana	Newspaper		Armenian newspaper.
Nor Serunt	Adana	Newspaper		Armenian newspaper.
