= Turkish comics =

Comic originating in Turkey

Turkish comics were introduced to the Ottoman Empire in the 19th and early 20th centuries in the form of satirical cartoons along with modern journalism. From then on, comic strips and cartoons (karikatür in Turkish) in newspapers and humor magazines, which typically deliver political or social messages, have been the mainstay of comics in Turkey. Comics conveying longer narratives (çizgi roman, literary "picture story") are often regarded as children's reading material. Comic book production has not been an established industry in Turkey, presumably overshadowed by foreign publications mainly from the U.S., Italy, or France.

== History ==
=== Ottoman period: 19th century-1920s ===
Some argue that the development of Turkish comics has been impeded by the lack of a prehistory of portraiture, stemming from the Islamic prohibition on idolatry, which has persisted to the present day. It is worth noting that the Ottoman Empire did have a tradition of miniature painting that has narrative elements. While some contend that this tradition served as the foundation of Turkish comics, others argue that it was merely illustrations accompanying manuscript texts and thus lacks a direct connection to modern cartooning.

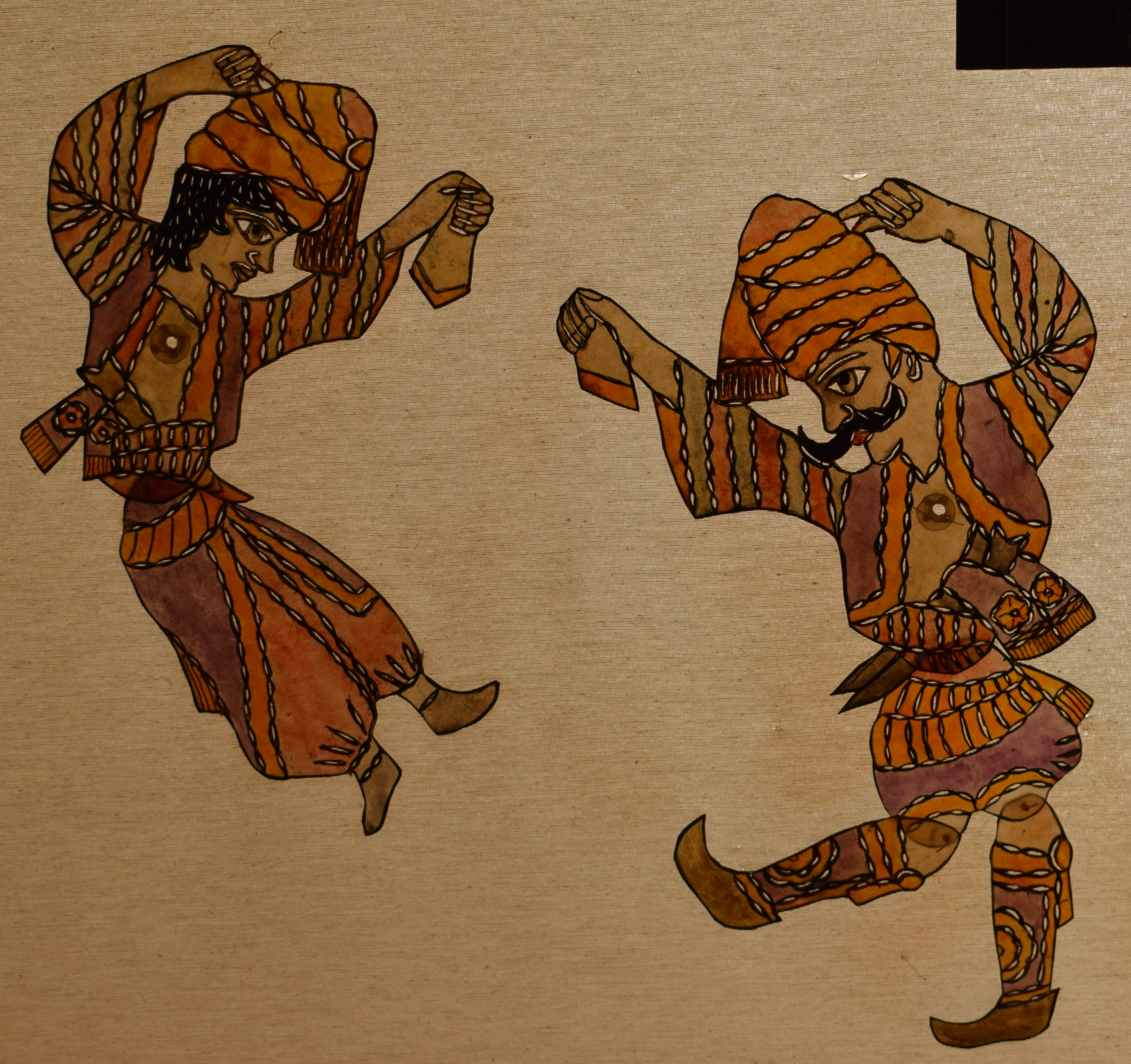
The traditional shadow play clown Karagöz were employed in early satirical cartoons.

Modern cartoons flowed in as satirical cartoons in the pages of newspapers and magazines that the Ottomans adopted from the West during the Tanzimat period (1839–1876), a time when Westernization was actively promoted across various sectors of society. Early satirical cartoonists appropriated traditional shadow-play characters, Karagöz and Hacivat, who had long been integral to the satirical culture of the Turkish common people. However, with a literacy rate of less than 10% during this period, access to publishing media was limited to the elite. Satirical magazines often faced repression due to criticism of the regime. Diyojen, the pioneering Ottoman satirical magazine founded by newspaper editor Teodor Kasap, was one of the repressed. The reign of Abdülhamit II brought thirty years of backlash where critical journalism and cartooning were prohibited. The subsequent Second Constitutional Era (1908–1918) saw a resurgence of satirical cartoons. Prominent among the cartoonists of this period was Cemil Cem, who adopted a realistic, three-dimensional drawing style of the West, as well as captions accompanying the cartoons.

During World War I and the War of Independence, cartoonists from various political factions fought each other through their works in numerous short-lived magazines. A few magazines managed to endure the political turmoil, including Karagöz (1908–1951), which retained the tastes of 19th century satirical magazines, and Akbaba (1922–1977), which supported the sultanate government. These magazines continued to be published into the subsequent democratic era.

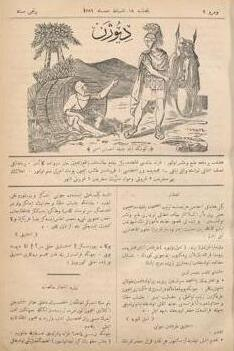
Front page of the first issue of the satirical magazine Diyojen (1870), featuring an illustration of Diogenes in a barrel.

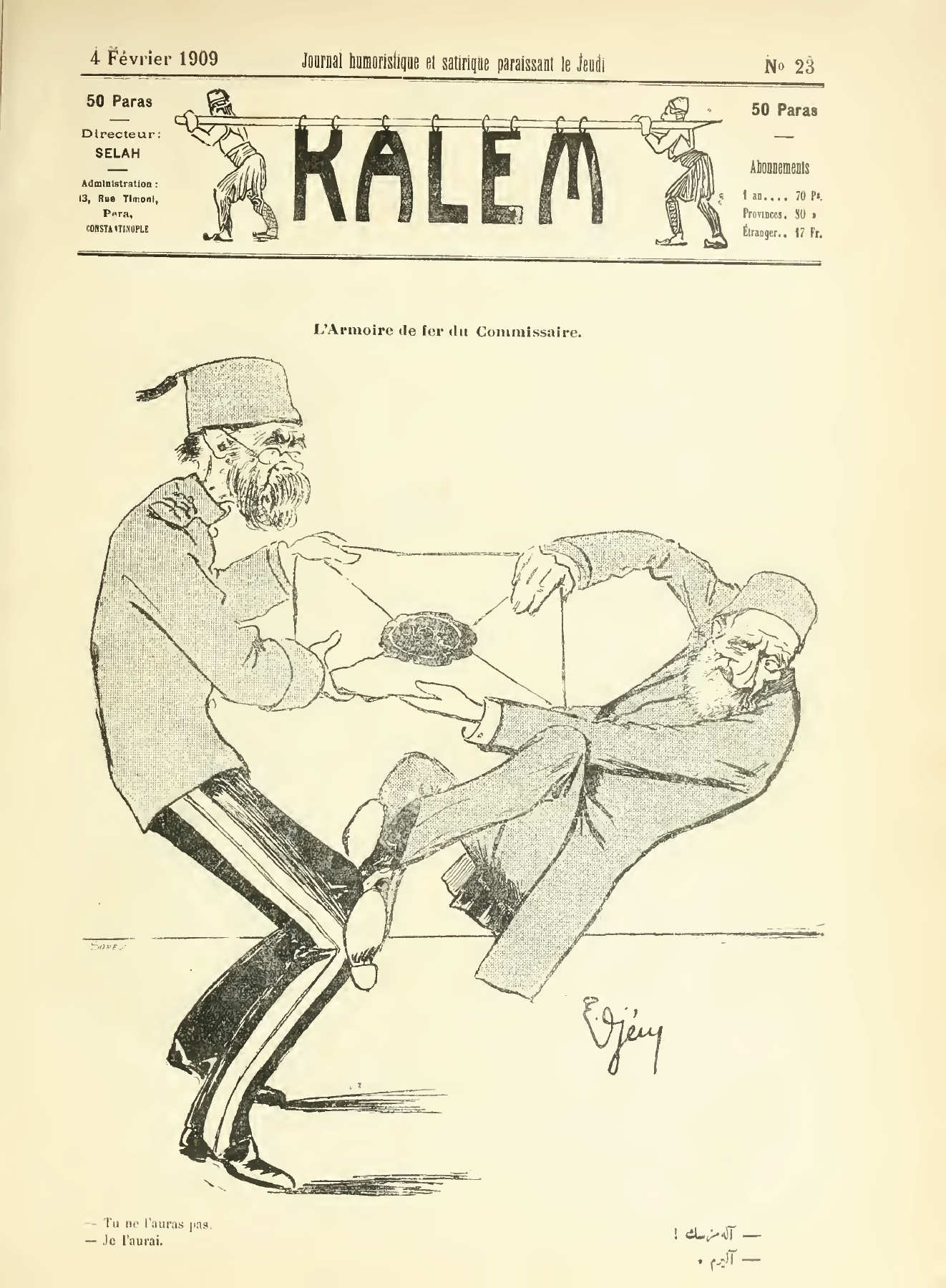
Cover of Kalem magazine (1909). Art by Cemil Cem.

=== From the establishment of the Republic to World War II: 1920s-1940s ===
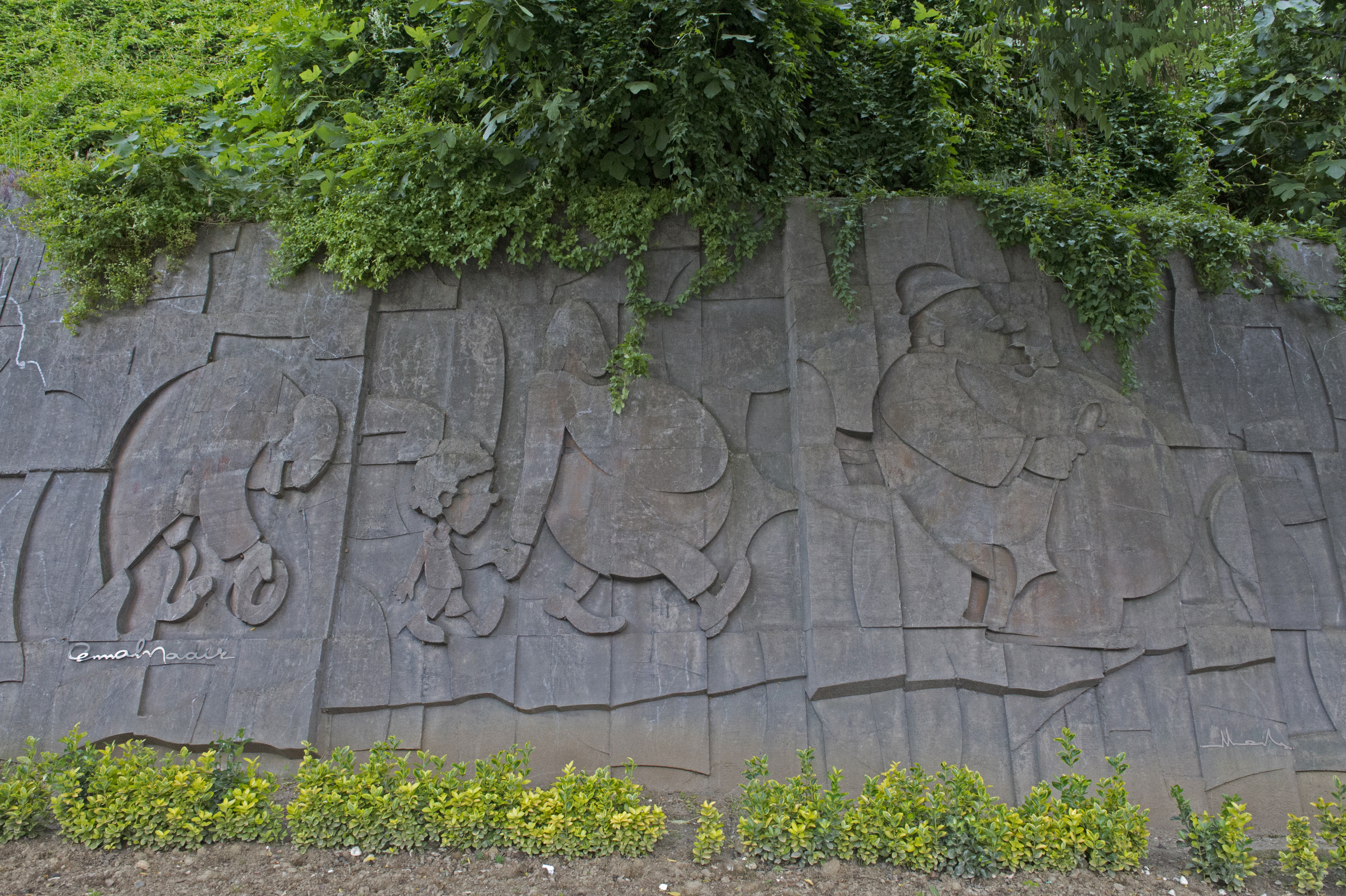
Monumental inscription dedicated to characters created by Cemal Nadir Güler (1902–1947). The most notable is Amcabey, pictured on the right with his trademark umbrella and bowler hat.

With the dissolution of the Ottoman Empire and the establishment of the Republic of Turkey, newspapers and magazines targeting the general public began to proliferate. They featured humorous pieces in a format akin to present-day cartoons. Due to the popularization of readership, as well as government suppression of regime criticism, more and more works focused on daily life and social conditions instead of political satire. Notable cartoonists of this era include Cemal Nadir Güler, Ramiz Gökçe, and Sururi Gümen. Güler, not hailing from the intellectual elite, pioneered a stylized cartoonish approach that diverged from the conventions of Western art, gaining popularity among the common people. One of Güler's creations, Amcabey, an Istanbul gentleman, emerged as one of Turkey's earliest cartoon characters and attained national prominence. Gökçe, famed for his depictions of women and a rival figure to Güler, created Tombul Teyze ("buxom auntie"), who became a beloved figure among male readers of the time.

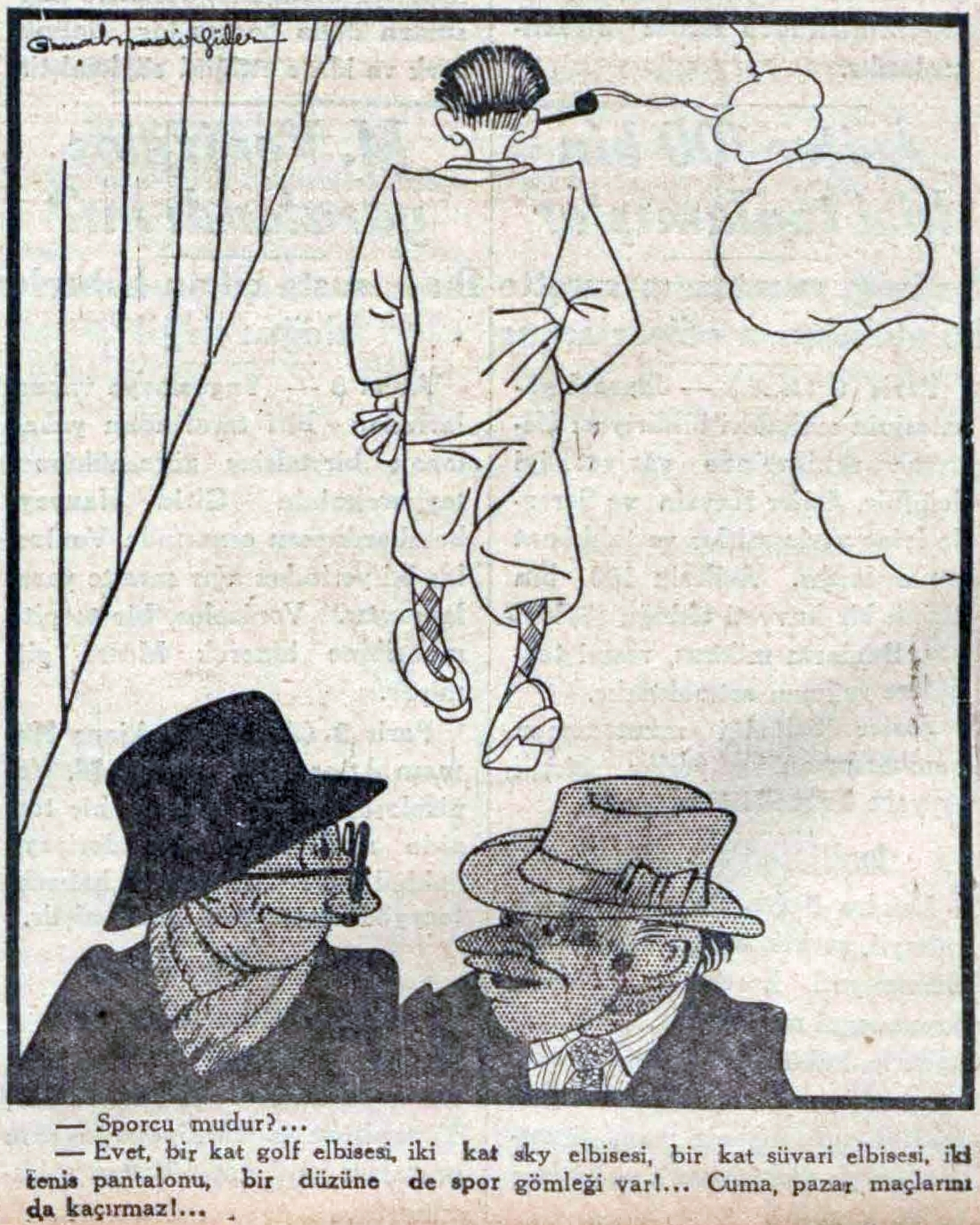
A work by Cemal Nadir Güler (1935) featured in Akşam.

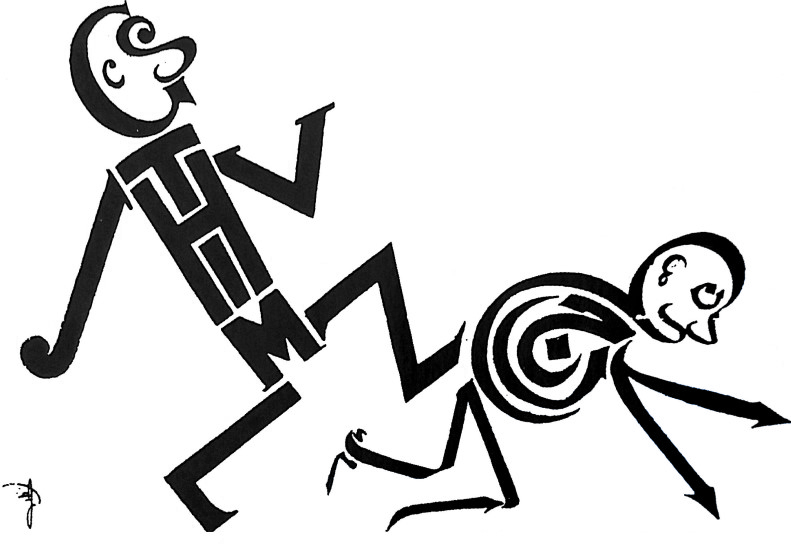
Drawn by Ramiz Gökçe (1928) and published in Akbaba, this piece satirizes the switch from Arabic to Latin script.

In around 1935, amidst the wave of Westernization under the regime of Mustafa Kemal Atatürk, there was a surge in the popularity of American comic strips such as The Phantom, Mickey Mouse, Flash Gordon, and Tarzan in newspapers and magazines aimed at children. As anti-capitalist and anti-American groups opposed allowing children to read these comics, their settings and ideologies were modified. Main characters' names and appearances were altered to Turkish equivalents, while villains remained foreign. 1001 Roman, the first comic magazine launched in 1939, became the most successful publication of its kind. However, the onset of World War II made it challenging to import new U.S. works. Concerns about the rapid Americanization also contributed to a decline in comics publishing. Nonetheless, it was during this period that young cartoonists, such as Suat Yalaz, Faruk Geç, and Şahap Ayhan, who had previously emulated foreign works began creating their own comics.

=== Golden age: 1950s-1970s ===
The era between 1955 and 1975 is often considered to be the golden age of Turkish comics. The republican regime implemented reforms in writing and art education, fostering an environment where artists could freely engage in creative pursuits. Once Republican People's Party ended its one-party dictatorship in 1950, restrictions on journalism were temporarily loosened, paving the way for the emergence of the so-called "50s generation" of cartoonists. Among those were Turhan Selçuk, Semih Balcıoğlu, and Selma Emiloğul, the latter gaining attention as a young female cartoonist.

As Turkey largely aligned with the Free World, Turkish comics strongly reflected Western influence after World War II. Newspapers serialized Western comic strips to boost their circulations. U.S. strips such as Blondie, Bringing Up Father, and Beetle Bailey gained prominence. In 1951, a solo comic book title featuring the western hero Pecos Bill from Italian comics became a 40,000-copy hit. It was followed by similar successes with works like Tex, Kinowa, and Zagor. Captain Miki, renamed "Tomix" in the Turkish version, became a favorite among children. From the late 1950s to the 1960s, there was an influx of French/Belgian comics (bande dessinée) such as Lucky Luke and Asterix. The popularity of titles like Tintin prompted the publication of unlicensed local versions. American superhero comics such as Superman initially garnered little interest and only gained popularity decades later, following the rise of superhero films.

Works by Turkish cartoonists in this era were characterized by anti-heroes that reflected the burgeoning middle class of the time. Among them was Abdülcanbaz, a con man trickster created by Turhan Selçuk in 1957, who evolved into a good-hearted hero over the years and remained active until the 2010s.

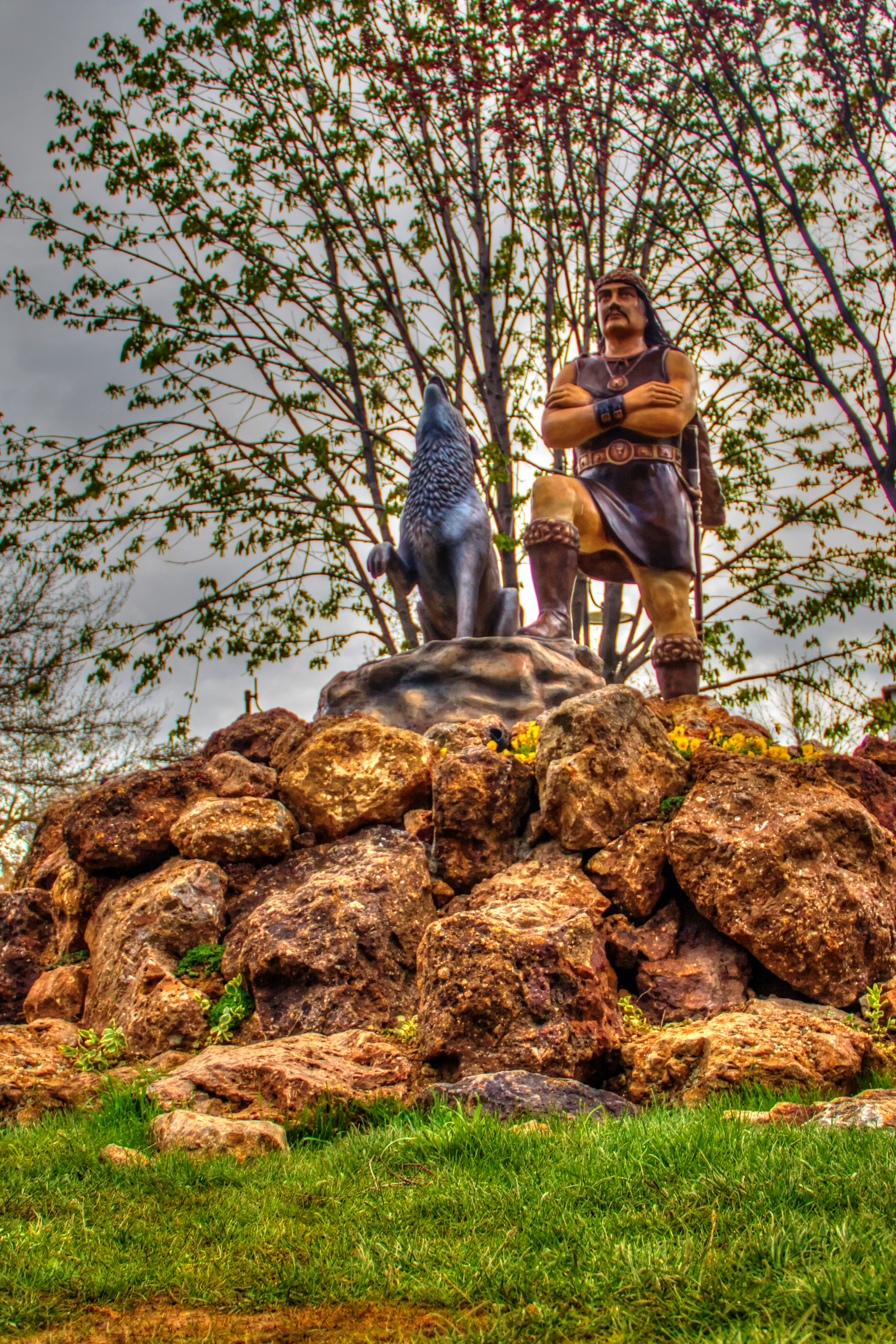
Tarkan (statue), a Hun hero raised by wolves.

When a coup d'état brought the military government to power in 1960, newspapers dropped their political cartoons and many humor magazines ceased publication. Comic book publishing was also affected, leading to the rise of historical works with nationalistic themes. Many depicted male Turkish heroes triumphing over enemy armies and winning the hearts of pagan women one after another. Suat Yaraz's creation, Karaoğlan (1962), set during the age of Genghis Khan, became one of Turkey's most iconic characters. (Note: Bülent Ecevit, who held the position of Prime Minister during the 1970s, was nicknamed "Karaoğlan.") Karaoğlan comics were also published in France for over 100 issues and translated into English and German. Other works influenced by Karaoğlan include Tarkan, Kara Murat, and Malkoçoğlu, among others.

During this period, translated Italian comic books such as Süper Teks, Zagor, and Kaptan Swing gained popularity, while Korku, founded in 1967, introduced American horror comics and iconic characters such as Vampirella and Conan the Barbarian to Turkish audiences. The 1960s also witnessed the resurgence of children's magazines like Zıp Zıp, along with the emergence of girls' magazines. Teen magazine Tina captured the imaginations of young female readers by featuring blonde, model-like protagonists leading modern, fashionable lives.

=== Gırgır and the era of humor magazines: 1970s-1990s ===
Turkish newspapers had not yet adopted advanced printing technology until the 1970s, resorting illustrations and cartoons instead of photographs. The introduction of offset printing significantly changed the landscape. Newspaper strips and their comic book reprints experienced a general decline in popularity and never fully recovered to their previous levels. Around 1971, comic books were selling a healthy 45,000 copies per issue, but this figure dwindled over the years. By the 1980s, horror comics such as Süper Korku had ceased publication altogether.

The humor magazine Gırgır ("fun"), founded by Oğuz Aral in 1972, provided a fresh critical perspective from the standpoint of the common man, supplanting grandiose satirical magazines aimed for intellectuals such as Akbaba. With a total circulation of one million copies, humor magazines including Gırgır and its offshoot Leman became virtually the sole medium for comics. The majority of works in these magazines were characterized by sarcasm and satire, often employing pejorative language. Avanak Avni ("Avni the Gullible"), a character created by Aral in Gırgır, represented "the average man of the time, bullied, dump but cunning," akin to Yellow Kid of early U.S. comic strip. Aral actively recruited newcomers to Gırgır, offering a platform for cartoonists who had transitioned from newspapers and nurturing talents who would shape the next generation. However, some view these artists as merely following in Aral's footsteps. Notable among those who emerged from Gırgır and established distinctive styles are Galip Tekin and İlban Ertem, renowned for their realistic and pessimistic works.

During the 1990s, several fanzines emerged within comic book fandom, yet they failed to gain attention from the general public who didn't perceive comics as a serious art form. Although a handful of enthusiast comic magazines emerged (such as Zeplin, Rh+, and Resimli Roman), drawing inspiration from acclaimed bande dessinée artists like Mœbius and Enki Bilal, or from foreign comic book movements such as Métal hurlant and graphic novels, they were all short-lived.

The Turkish publishing industry faced significant challenges as television became widespread during this period. Reports indicate that the circulation of humor magazines dropped to one-fifth in the decade leading up to the mid-1990s. In response, these magazines shifted towards a more underground direction, avoiding direct competition with television by focusing on themes such as obscenity, sex, and cynicism. Simultaneously, the emergence of a generation prioritizing personal lifestyles over traditional left-right political conflicts changed the nature of satirical cartoons. L-Manyak, an offshoot of Leman magazine, gained prominence for its social commentary, often employing violent and obscene imagery that challenged conventional norms. The previously dominant minimalistic art style has given way to more intricate and lifelike backgrounds. L-Manyak's style remained prevalent in Turkish cartoons in the 2010s. One of popular serials of the magazine, Kötü Kedi Şerafettin ("Bad Cat Sherafettin") by Bülent Üstün was adapted into an animated film in 2015. Also during this period, erotica such as Druuna began to appear in magazines including the Turkish version of Playboy.

=== Modern times: 2000s and Beyond ===
Contemporary Turkish comics primarily consist of cartoons satirizing social mores published in popular humor magazines and political satires in mainstream press. Cartoons are recognized as a distinct art form, even having dedicated research and critical journal, Gül Diken. On the other hand, long-form comic narratives often occupy a peripheral role.

Humor magazines remain successful in the 2010s. The Turkish Directorate General of Press and Information described them as "one of the most successful publication categories in Turkey". In 2011, Bayan Yanı ("On the Side of Women"), the first satirical cartoon magazine from a woman's perspective, was launched.

Since the 2000s, the graphic novel movement has made its way to the Middle East with several works being produced in Turkey by creators who serve as both writers and artists. The Ministry of National Education has initiated a project to adapt Turkish and foreign literary works into graphic novels. Autobiographical works with a confessional tone have been published, such as Sandıkiçi by Ersin Karabulut and Öyle Bir Geçer Zaman Ki by M. K. Parker. Translations and publications of foreign works, especially those adopted into U.S. films or Japanese anime, are also popular. As of 2017, the only graphic novel with Turkey origin published in English is Dare to Disappoint: Growing up in Turkey, a memoir by Özge Samancı.

== Film adaptations ==
The first successful film adaptation of comics in Turkey was Cicican (1963), based on a comic inspired by the American comic strip Li'l Abner. Adaptations of period comic books gained popularity in the 1960s and 1970s, resulting in the production of seven Karaoğlan films, five Tarkan films, and eight Kara Murat films up until the 2010s. Additionally, the cartoon series Bizimkiler, featuring a fictional musical band, was adapted into the film Hüdaverdi-Pırtık in 1971. However, adaptations of comics became less frequent after the 1980s, with only a few exceptions such as the animated film Kötü Kedi Şerafettin in the 2000s.
