= Güleryüz (disambiguation) =

Güleryüz is a Turkish coachbuilding company.

Güleryüz may also refer to:

- Göknur Güleryüz (born 2003), Turkish women's footballer
- Güleryüz (magazine), Ottoman Turkish satirical magazine
- Bedia Güleryüz (1903–1991), Turkish painter
