= Yeni Adam =

Cultural magazine in Istanbul (1934–1979)

- Editor: İsmail Baltacıoğlu
- Categories: Cultural magazine
- Frequency: Weekly; Monthly
- Founder: İsmail Baltacıoğlu
- First issue: 1 January 1934
- Final issue: June 1979
- Country: Turkey
- Based in: Istanbul
- Language: Turkish

Yeni Adam (Turkish: The New Man) was a cultural magazine which was published in Istanbul, Turkey, between 1934 and 1979 with some interruptions. It was one of the publications which were started to support the policies and ideas of the newly founded Republic of Turkey. In line with this aim the title of the magazine was a reference to the person who would be a product of the Republic.

== History and profile ==
Yeni Adam was first published on 1 January 1934 and had 12 pages. Its founder was İsmail Baltacıoğlu who edited the magazine until 1960s. He was one of the advisors of Mustafa Kemal Atatürk. The magazine was first published by the Letâfet publishing house in Istanbul on a weekly basis. In 1937 Yeni Adam was one of two publications represented the Republic of Turkey at the Balkan Print and Publication Congress portraying modernism. The other one was Yedigün (Turkish: Seven Days).

Yeni Adam ceased publication for one year on 3 March 1938 when it was closed by the Turkish government due to its extensive criticism over Nazi Germany. The magazine was restarted on 9 March 1939. Its publisher was Sebat Publishers, İstanbul, in the 1940s. From 6 December 1951 Yeni Adam came out monthly. It folded following the publication of the issue 921 dated June 1979.

== Contributors and content ==
There were no regular contributors of the magazine. Throughout its long history many notable figures published articles in Yeni Adam, including Nurullah Ataç, Hüsamettin Bozok, Suphi Nuri İleri, Bedri Rahmi Eyüboğlu, and Zühtü Müritoğlu. Mediha Esenel contributed to the magazine between 1937 and 1946. The magazine's founder and editor İsmail Baltacıoğlu also published articles in the magazine.

Yeni Adam supported nationalism, traditionalism, secularism, statism and revolutionary approach and covered articles on different topics such as literature, poetry, psychology, scientific and philosophical news. It also published translations from the western publications. The magazine featured political articles until February 1938 when it was temporarily banned. Following its restart next year Yeni Adam did not contain political articles until its demise in 1979.

Baltacıoğlu's writings in Yeni Adam were mostly about women. The magazine argued that women's sole function was that of being a homemaker, but due to their emotional nature they cannot be successful in public sphere. The magazine frequently addressed sexuality implicitly and explicitly. It advocated sexual practice within matrimony and condemned such acts outside marriage. For the contributors of Yeni Adam romantic love was a reflection of weakness, immaturity, and sickness, and marriages should be based mutual understanding between men and women from the same or similar social background. One of these authors who advocated these views was the Turkish psychologist, İzeddin Şadan, who was among the leading figures in psychoanalysis in Turkey. He described love as "a volatile microbe” resulting in diseases “like measles, pneumonia and typhoid", and claimed that it should be cured like others. Şadan introduced his three-step scientific treatment of love which was developed based on the principles of modern psychiatry in the magazine.
