= Yalaz =

Yalaz is a Turkish surname. Notable people with the surname include:

- Suat Yalaz (1932–2020), Turkish comic book artist
- Tayyar Yalaz (1901–1943), Turkish sport wrestler
