= Süs (magazine) =

Weekly women's magazine in Turkey (1923–1924)

- Editor-in-chief: Mehmet Rauf
- Categories: Women's magazine
- Frequency: Monthly
- Publisher: Tanin publishing house
- First issue: 16 June 1923
- Final issue: 26 July 1924
- Country: Turkey
- Based in: Istanbul
- Language: Turkish

Süs (Turkish: Ornament) was an illustrated weekly women's magazine published in Istanbul, Turkey, for one year between 1923 and 1924. Its subtitle was Haftalık Edebi Hanım Mecmuası (Turkish: Weekly Literary Women's Magazine). It was known for being the first women's magazine of the newly established Republic of Turkey.

== History and profile ==
Süs was first published in Istanbul on 16 June 1923. The magazine was edited by Mehmed Rauf and published by the Tanin publishing house on a weekly basis. Hüseyin Remzi was its managing director.

Süs contained 16 pages and featured articles on women-related topics printed in the Ottoman Turkish. Each week the magazine reported news about worldwide women's movement and about fashion. Abdullah Cevdet published an article in 1924 on family life in Britain and in other European countries emphasizing their attitudes towards childhood. The magazine also serialized novels written by Mehmet Rauf and others. The cover designs of the magazine were very attractive. The cover of the first issue featured Halide Edip Adıvar. In the following issues well-known Turkish women were featured in the cover of the magazine, including Latife Hanım, spouse of Mustafa Kemal.

Various notable writers contributed to Süs, including Halide Nusret Zorlutuna, Musahipzade Celal, Suat Derviş, Ahmet Haşim, Abdülhak Hâmid Tarhan, Cenâb Şehâbeddîn, Faruk Nafiz Çamlıbel, Hamdullah Suphi Tanrıöver, Mehmet Emin Yurdakul, Peyami Safa, Ruşen Eşref, Süleyman Nazif, Yusuf Ziya Ortaç, Faik Ali Ozansoy, Celal Sahir Erozan, Selahaddin Enis, and Hüseyin Cahit Yalçın.

Süs folded after the publication of the issue dated 26 July 1924. It produced a total of fifty-five issues during its run.
