= Tarkan (comics) =

Publication information
- First appearance: Mars'ın Kılıcı in Hürriyet (1967)
- Created by: Sezgin Burak

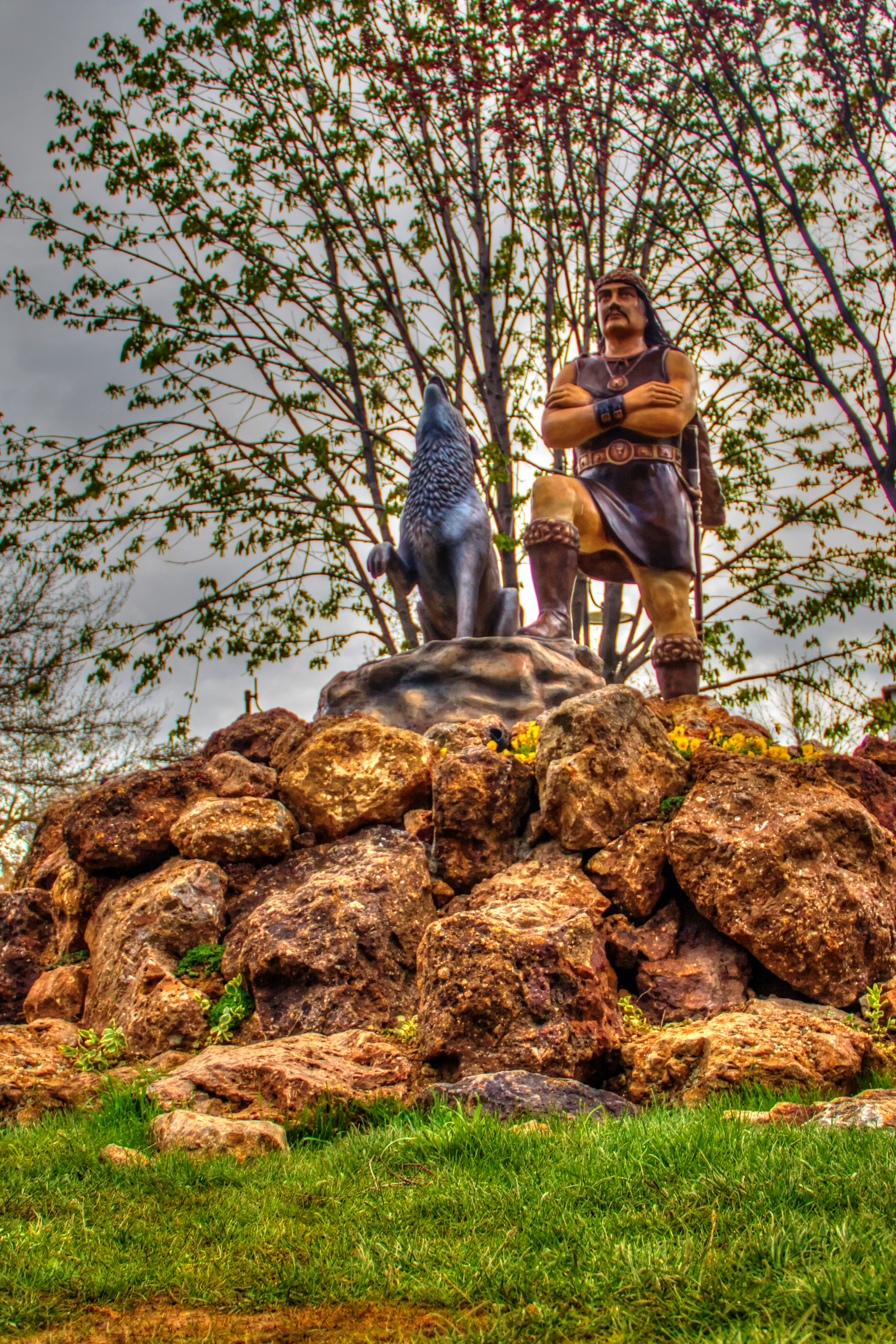
Statue of Tarkan and the Wolf

Tarkan is a fictional Hunnic warrior, created by the Turkish cartoonist Sezgin Burak.

Some of the earlier Turkish cartoon depictions the heroized Huns were Atilla Geliyor and Atilla'nın Ölümü, created collectively by Şahap Ayhan and Ayhan Erer in late 1940s.

== Publication history ==
Tarkan was created by Sezgin Burak while he was resident in Milan, working for the Italian art agency Studio D'Ami. The first adventure of Tarkan, Mars'ın Kılıcı (The Sword of Mars) was serialised in 1967 as a comic strip on the pages of daily Hürriyet. From 1970, adventures of Tarkan had been published in an eponymous magazine. The last Tarkan adventure, Milano'ya Giden Yol (The Road to Milan) was left unfinished due to the artist's death in 1978, only to be completed by cartoonist Özcan Alper (i.e. Özcan Eralp) in 1983.

The comics are being reprinted.

== Fictional character biography ==
Tarkan's background is revealed in the adventure Gümüş Eyer (The Silver Saddle). He is born as the son of the Hunnic warlord Altar in the Caucasus Mountains. As an infant, he is orphaned after an Alan raid and raised by wild grey wolves, a process that makes him overwhelmingly powerful and courageous. Later, he becomes a warrior in the service of Attila the Hun.

Tarkan's sole companion is his grey wolf, who is named simply Kurt (Turkish for wolf). Tarkan is occasionally helped by Kulke, a cunning and skillful warrior of short stature, and Bige, a bold and chaste girl with romantic interest in him.

== Film adaptations ==
All Tarkan adaptations - except two - feature Kartal Tibet as the protagonist, in a series that ran from 1969 to 1973. However, the first Tarkan film is Tarkan: Canavarlı Kule (Tarkan: The Monster Tower), which was shot and released separately from the first Tibet Tarkan (Tarkan: Mars'ın Kılıcı), following a dispute about the casting of the lead actor. Another film, made in 1971, is Tarkan Viking Kanı (Tarkan: The Viking Blood). An earlier film inspired by Tarkan is Bozkırlar Şahini Targan (Tarkan: The Falcon of the Steppes) directed in 1968 by Mehmet Aslan who would also be the director of four Tarkan titles.

== Legacy ==
Although the name of the character is claimed to be styled as a compound word referring to Tatar ethnic origin of the artist himself, the word Tarkhan is actually a title for Turkic and Mongolian nobility and was used as a given name millennia before publication of the comic series.

Following Tarkan's great success, it became a popular given name in Turkey.

== See also ==
- Karaoğlan
- Asena
- Turkish comics
