= İsmail Hakkı Baltacıoğlu =

Turkish academic, journalist and intellectual (1886–1978)

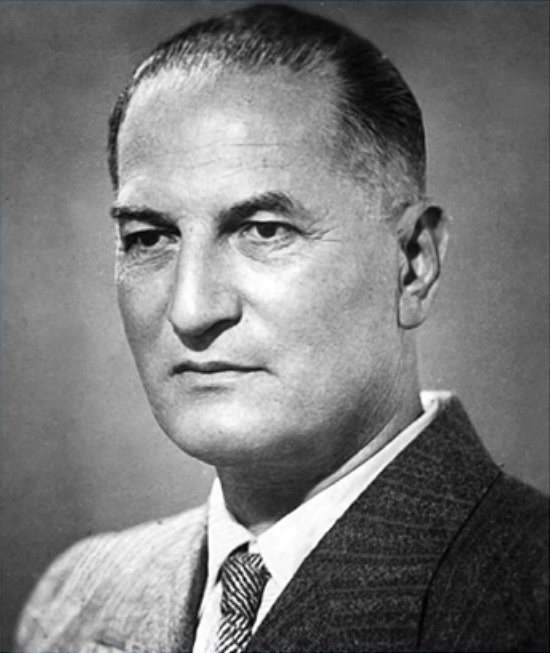
- Baltacıoğlu during his term at the Parliament in 1943
- Born: İsmail Hakkı; 28 February 1886; Cihangir, Constantinople, Ottoman Empire
- Died: 1 April 1978 (aged 92); Ankara, Turkey
- Education: Darulfünun
- Scientific career
- Fields: Botany; Pedagogy; Calligraphy
- Workplaces: Darulfünun (Istanbul University); Ankara University

İsmail Hakkı Baltacıoğlu (28 February 1886 – 1 April 1978) was a Turkish academic, journalist and intellectual. Until 1933 he was a faculty member at Darulfunün, later Istanbul University, of which he was the first rector following the establishment of the Republic of Turkey. Following his dismissal from the university in 1933 he published and edited a cultural magazine entitled Yeni Adam and served as a deputy at the Turkish Parliament from Republican People's Party for two terms from 1942 to 1950. He is known as the father of the educational thought and practice of the Republic of Turkey.

== Early life and education ==
He was born in Cihangir district of Constantinople, Ottoman Empire, on 28 February 1886. He completed his studies at Vefa High School in 1903. There he learned French. He attended Darulfünun, precursor of Istanbul University, the following year and received a degree in botany in 1908. He also studied calligraphy at Darulfunün. Between 1909 and 1911 he was in Europe to study pedagogy and calligraphy.

== Career ==
In 1908 he joined Darulfünun as a faculty member and taught calligraphy. He continued his academic studies after his return from Europe in 1911 and became a professor of pedagogy in 1913. From 1914 he taught psychology at the Teachers School for Girls. In 1921 he was named as the dean of the Faculty of Letters at Darulfünun which he held the post until 1924 when he was appointed rector of the university. He had to resign from office in 1927 due to his support for the student demonstrations against an increase in the price of train tickets.

He continued to serve as a faculty member and taught sociology and ethics. In 1930 he joined the Free Republican Party and functioned as the chair of its Istanbul branch. However, it was closed in November 1930 three months after its establishment. He was dismissed from the university in 1933 when a university reform law was put in force. He established a weekly cultural magazine, Yeni Adam, in 1934 and edited it until the 1960s.

In 1941 Baltacıoğlu joined Ankara University's Faculty of Language, History and Geography and was promoted to the professorship in pedagogy. Between 1942 and 1950 he was a member of the Parliament for two terms. He was first a deputy for Afyon and then for Kırşehir. In 1956 he started another magazine named Din Yolu (Turkish: Road of Religion) which ceased publication shortly after its establishment.

=== Work ===
In the period between 1914 and 1920 he was a contributor toTürk Yurdu journal. He was among those who played a role in shaping the education of Turkey after its establishment as a republic.

He published various books, including Talim ve Terbiyede İnkılap (Turkish: Revolution in Education) (1912), Terbiye ve İman (Turkish: Discipline and Faith) (1914), Resmin Usul-ü Tedrisi (Turkish: Procedures of Painting) (1915), Din ve Hayat (Turkish: Religion and Life) (1918), İçtimai Mektep (Turkish: Social School) (1942) and Türke Doğru (Turkish: Towards the Turk) (1943). There are also numerous articles written by him which are concerned with pedadogy, sociology, arts, religion, philosophy and literature. He translated Quran into Turkish and published it in 1957.

=== Views and alliances ===
İsmail Hakkı was a member of the Committee of Union and Progress. He was among those who objected the invasion of Anatolia by the Allied forces and participated in the demonstrations held in Sultanahmet square as a speaker in 1919 against the Greek invasion of İzmir. Baltacıoğlu was a follower of Émile Durkheim and Ziya Gökalp. However, his sociological views were slightly different from theirs. For instance, Baltacıoğlu paid much more attention to religion, language and arts than other social institutions in that for him these three are the basis of a society's traditions. His views were also influenced from the French philosopher Henri Bergson. For Baltacıoğlu sociology must "arrange social life." He termed his approach as traditionalism.

Baltacıoğlu was a supporter of the policies implemented by the Presidents Atatürk and İsmet İnönü.

== Later years and death ==
Baltacıoğlu continued to publish his magazine Yeni Adam which was closed after his death on 1 April 1978.
