= Pat Magnum =

Pat Magnum is the main character in two French comics series drawn by Suat Yalaz and Vince Vita from 1979 to 1981.

== Character ==
Patrick Denner, nicknamed Pat Magnum is an American private investigator depicted with dark curly hair, beard and moustache, and as an occasional womanizer who lives grotesque adventures.

== Series ==
Pat Magnum first appeared in July 1979 in Editora publishers' magazine Détective Strictement Privé, first issue drawn by Suat Yalaz under the pseudonym Gi. Toro. Yalaz was replaced by Vince Vita (under the pseudonym Motticella) in the fifth and last issue of the magazine released in November 1979. The second series of Pat Magnum adventures were released in Edilau publishers' magazine Super Flic in October 1979, first issue drawn again by Vita who was replaced by Yalaz in the fourth issue (July 1980). The first two issues had the character renamed "Mick Vince". The last Super Flic issue and the last original Pat Magnum adventure was released in December 1981 and re-releases followed in the 1980s and 1990s.
