= Necmettin Hacıeminoğlu =

Turkish linguist (1932–1996)

Necmettin Hacıeminoğlu (10 November 1932 – 26 June 1996) was a Turkish poet, linguist and writer.

== His life ==
Hacıeminoğlu was born in Maraş in 1932. His father, Mustafa, died when he was a baby. He moved to Adana to support his family and he continued his primary/high education in Adana. He discovered his interest in Turkish literature and Turkish language during those years (having been influenced by his brother Nihat's fondness of literature).

With support of his literature teacher Şevken Kutkan, he started to write his first journal writings and began study with Nurullah Ataç.

He went to Istanbul to continue his college education in Istanbul University Faculty of Literature, Turcology (İstanbul Üniversitesi Edebiyat Fakültesi, Türkoloji). He maintained his academic career in university.

He used the name Necmettin Özdarendeli in his first writings, then he changed his surname to Hacıeminoğlu. He contributed several hundred articles to newspapers like Hergün, Tercüman, and Ortadoğu; and in many journals like Türk Dili, Türk Edebiyatı, Töre, Milli Kültür, and Yeni Düşünce. He was judged because of his thoughts, and this was the first time a teacher in university was judged because of his ideas.

He came to Edirne to establish a Turkish Language and Literature Faculty in Trakya University and he maintained his post in Edirne until 1993.

He died in 1996 in Ankara.
