= Peyami Safa =

Turkish journalist, columnist and novelist (1899-1961)

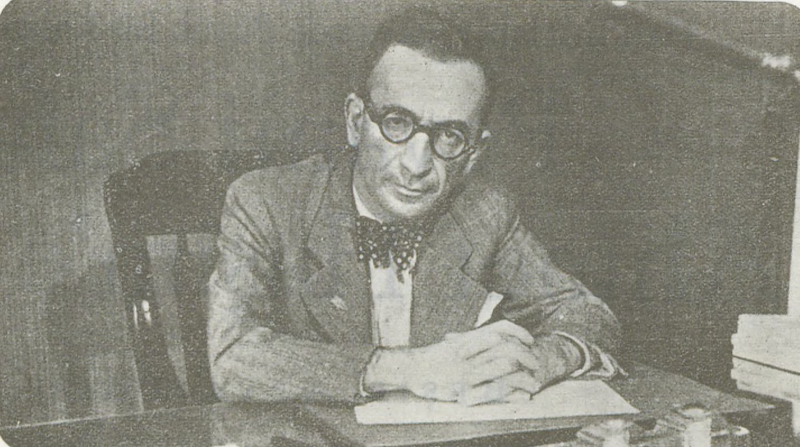
- Peyami Safa
- Born: April 2, 1899; Fatih, Istanbul, Ottoman Empire
- Died: June 15, 1961 (aged 62); Kadıköy, Istanbul, Turkey
- Occupation: Writer · journalist
- Spouse: Nebahat Erinç (m. 1938)
- Children: Merve Safa
- Writing career
- Pen name: Server Bedi · Çömez · Serâzâd · Safiye Peyman · Bedia Servet
- Period: 1910–1961
- Notable work: Cingöz Recai

Peyami Safa (April 2, 1899 – June 15, 1961) was a Turkish journalist, columnist and novelist. He came to the fore in the Turkish literature of the Republican era with his psychological works such as Dokuzuncu Hariciye Koğuşu (Ninth External Ward). He reflected his life and his changes to his works. He wrote many novels under the pseudonym Server Bedi. He created Cingöz Recai, a character inspired by Arsène Lupin of the French writer Maurice Leblanc. He also worked as a journalist at various institutions and published several magazines such as Kültür Haftası with his brother İlhami Safa.

The poet Tevfik Fikret named him when he was born. After he lost his father at a young age, he lived under difficult conditions with his mother and brother. Bone tuberculosis appeared on his right arm. He processed his psychology in those years in his autobiographical novel, Ninth External Ward. He gave his first literary products during his education in Vefa High School. He worked as a teacher for a short time. The stories he published under the title Stories of the Century drew attention and received encouraging reactions. He entered pen quarrels with prominent literary writers of the period. He experienced various changes by exhibiting positivist, materialist, mystical, nationalist, conservative, anti-communist and corporatist attitudes. With his knowledge of French, he closely followed Western culture and innovations. In his early days, he made translations from names such as Maupassant and Rousseau. He always chose Istanbul as the venue for his later works and never gave up the synthesis and analysis of the East and the West. He published articles with critical style in newspapers such as Milliyet. His good relationships with Nâzım Hikmet and Necip Fazıl Kısakürek turned into pen fights over time. At first, he became closer to the Republican People's Party, then to the Democrat Party.

He continued his literary life, which he started at a young age, until his death. He was mainly nationalist and conservative. The Ministry of National Education recommended his two books for secondary school students. His works were also adapted to the cinema and series in various periods.

== Life ==
=== Early life ===
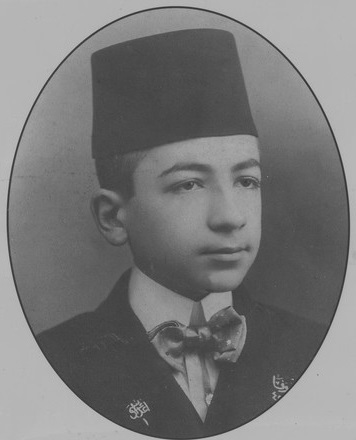
A childhood photo of Peyami Safa (1913)

Peyami Safa was born on April 2, 1899, in Gedikpaşa and named after Tevfik Fikret, one of the poets of Servet-i Fünûn. His father İsmail Safa was referred to as a "mother-born poet" by Muallim Naci and belonged to a family of Trabzon origin. His mother is Server Bedia Hanım. Peyami Safa's father was one of the opponents of Abdülhamid II and died in Sivas while in exile without leaving anything financial to his family. Peyami Safa, who lost his father when he was one and a half years old, was brought up by his mother under hard conditions with his brother Ilhami Safa. During his primary education, bone tuberculosis appeared in his right arm. Due to his illness, he could not attend school and found himself among doctors, patients and caregivers at a young age. He influenced the effect of this disease in his work, Dokuzuncu Hariciye Koğuşu.

He started his high school education in Vefa High School in Fatih in 1910. During these years, he was a classmate with Ekrem Hakkı Ayverdi and Elif Naci. Also Hasan Âli Yücel and Yusuf Ziya Ortaç were among their high school friends. He gave his first literary discussions and products in those years. He wrote his first story essay Piano Teaching and his first novel essay Eski Dost in high school. In addition, the first story book titled Don't Take This Book, which he published during these periods, aroused curiosity and sold out within a few days. He could not continue his high school education due to his illness and his family's livelihood problems. He developed the knowledge of French by memorizing Petit Larousse, a gift from his father's close friends, Abdullah Cevdet, and began to be interested in medicine, psychology and philosophy books besides literary works. Due to his interest in the theater in the future, he took the Dârülbedayi exams but could not continue despite his success. During the times of the First World War, he started working in the Post Office to help his mother. Later, he was appointed as a teacher to the Rehber-i İttihad School in Boğaziçi (1917) and worked for a while in the Düyûn-ı Umûmiye Administration (1918).

=== Armistice and the Republican Era ===
These stories then gained a great success among the public, which still amazed me. The young literature of that time encouraged me fervently, asking me to sign my stories. Yakup Kadri says, "You brought us a style," Yahya Kemal said, "Peyami is the most beautiful work of Ismail Safa".

— Peyami Safa, after his stories, which he published under the title Yüzyılın Hikâyeleri ("Stories of the Century"), attracted attention.

Peyami Safa, who left his teaching position at the Rehber-i İttihad School during the armistice period in 1918, started publishing the newspaper Twentieth Century (Yirminci Yüzyıl) with his brother. In this newspaper, he drew attention with the stories he published under the heading "Stories of the Century". He also made his first pen fight against Cenap Şahabettin's adaptation play (1919). When he received a degree in the story contest organized by Alemdar newspaper, he was encouraged to write by the leading writers of the period. After Yirminci Yüzyıl was closed, they continued to work for other newspapers such as Tercüman-ı Hakikat and Tasvîr-i Efkâr (1922) after the declaration of the Republic. Safa was one of the contributors of the women's magazine Süs between 1923 and 1924. In addition, he published his first novel, Sözde Kızlar (So-called Girls), for his livelihood. By 1924, He published his several works including Mahşer, Bir Gece (One Evening), Süngülerin Gölgesinde (In the Shadow of the Bayonets) and Istanbul Hikayeleri (the Stories of Istanbul). In 1925, he published a short-lived newspaper called Büyük Yol with Halil Lütfü Dördüncü. Also in these years, he wrote in Cumhuriyet newspaper with the signature of "Server Bedi" and "Peyami Safa". He went on his relationship with the newspaper as a columnist and literature manager (1928-1940). His article titled "New Literary Circles" published in Hilal-i Ahmer magazine led to a pencil fight with Ahmet Haşim (1928).

In 1933 he dedicated a column for the incident in Razgrad.

In the early years, under the influence of Abdullah Cevdet, he wrote articles in Ijtihad magazine with positivist and materialist thoughts. In particular, he participated in the discussion between Abdullah Cevdet and Celal Nuri Ileri. During the period of Armistice, he generally gave both a westernist and a nationalist appearance. He approached Turkish Letter Revolution, which took place during the time of Mustafa Kemal Atatürk, anxiously considering that it would cause cultural disconnections between generations, but in the following periods he became one of the complementary of this revolution and participated in language congresses.

=== Relations with Nazım Hikmet ===
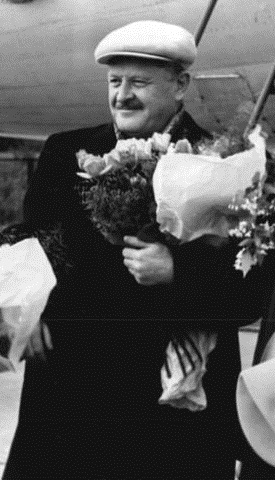
Nâzım Hikmet

When Nâzım Hikmet returned to Turkey benefiting from the amnesty law, Safa published a poem entitled "Volcano", written by Nazım for the forgiveness of him in Cumhuriyet. The next day, Cumhuriyet published a statement that the signature under the poem did not reflect its own views and missions. After this announcement, Safa left the newspaper and started writing in the journal Resimli Ay, published by Sabiha Sertel and Zekeriya Sertel. Nâzım Hikmet, Sabahattin Ali, Vâlâ Nureddin and Cevat Şakir Kabaağaçlı were among the most well-known contributors of this magazine. [Peyami Safa and Nâzım Hikmet worked together in the journal Hareketin the following periods. The friendship between them continued with Peyami Safa's dedication to Dokuzuncu Hariciye Koğuşu, to Nâzım Hikmet. Nâzım Hikmet, on the other hand, used the following expressions about the novel in Resimli Ay by referring to Reşat Nuri Güntekin's Çalıkuşu:

I have read this last novel of Peyami three times. I can read and read thirty times more ... It is not possible for those who cry to Çalıkuşu to understand Dokuzuncu Hariciye Koğuşu. It would be sold by ten thousand, one hundred thousand, one million; if they knew how to read and write the self and pure masses of people who heard the anguish, torment and joy with great enthusiasm.

Safa published an article entitled Varız Diyen Nesil (The Generation who says We Exist) in the first issue of the journal Hareket. Although it reflected the views of young literary writers and the new generation, it was criticized by Yakup Kadri Karaosmanoğlu in Milliyet, the famous pencil fight called Saman Ekmeği Kavgası (The Fight of Straw Bread) started in the history of Turkish press. Safa was accused of being Bolshevik for participating in the discussions titled Putları Yıkıyoruz (We Are Destroying the Idols), which started in Resimli Ay, together with Nâzım Hikmet and writing articles in the left-wing newspaper Tan. But he always denied these allegations. The friendship of the two continued after the closing of Resimli Ay. In time, Nâzım Hikmet's desire to bring him to communism and as a result of his efforts to discourage Nâzım Hikmet from this ideology, this friendship turned into a great hostility. Nâzım Hikmet accused Peyami Safa in his article titled Coffee and Casino Intellectuals written in Tan under the pseudonym Orhan Selim. Peyami Safa also responded to Nâzım Hikmet under the series titled Biraz Aydınlık in the magazine Hafta, which he published with his brother. From this point on, Peyami Safa adopted an anti-communist worldview until the end of his life. In the following process, Peyami Safa's works with the signature of Server Bedi and Cingöz Recai typing became the main subject of the discussions between the two.

=== Death ===
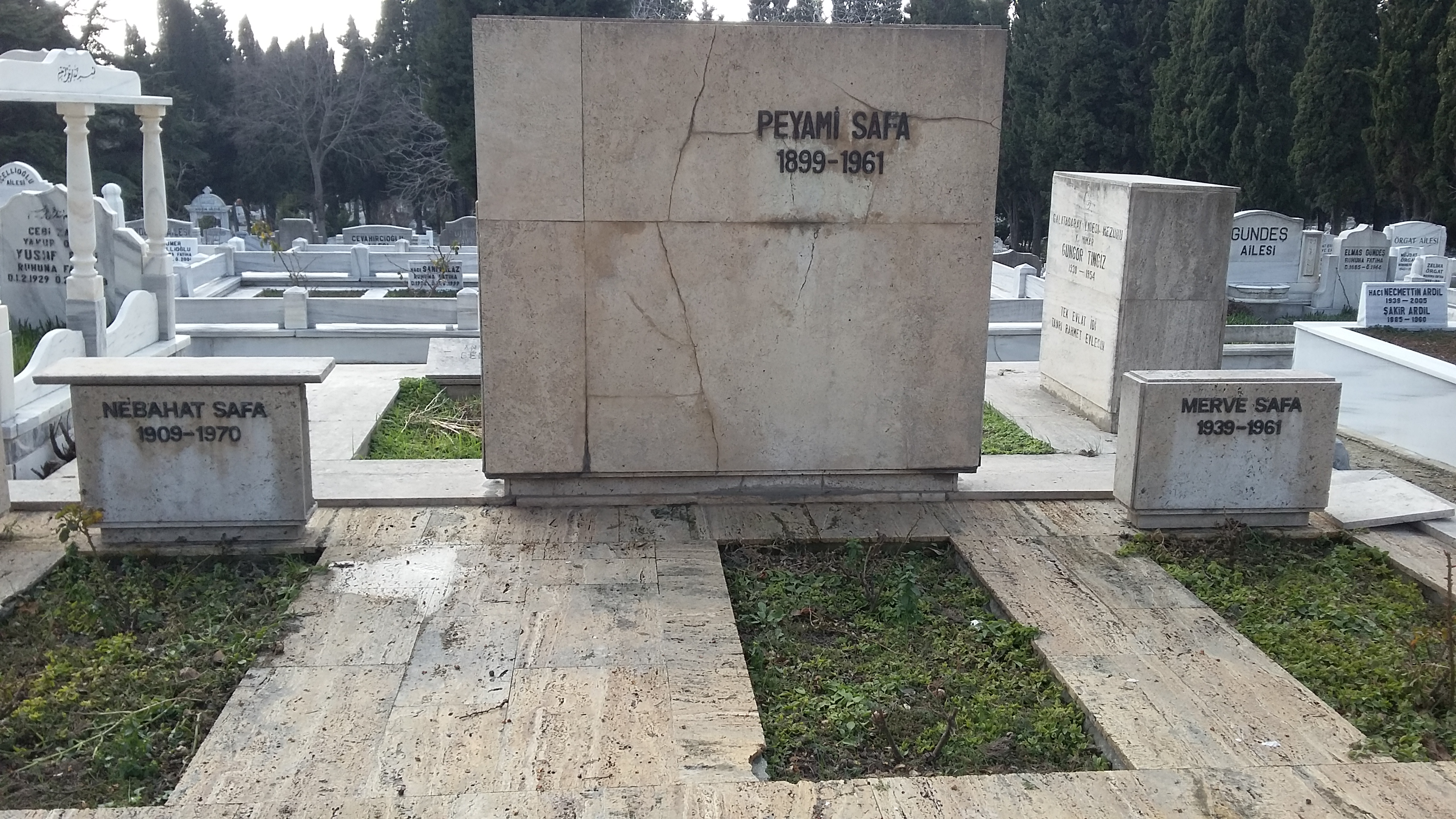
The grave of the Safa family in Edirnekapı Cemetery

He died on June 15, 1961, in Istanbul at the age of 62 after couple of months his son Merve died, as he was serving his time in the military. Peyami Safa was laid to rest at the Edirnekapı Martyr's Cemetery. He was the editor-in-chief of the daily Son Havadis as he died.

== Literary life ==
Most of his novels were created before 1940. In these novels, he stressed on the west-east conflict in the Turkish society during the early years of the Turkish Republic. His novel Dokuzuncu Hariciye Koğuşu gained much interest. In 1931, he wrote his only historical novel about Attila the Hun. Besides these novels, he wrote many serial stories and novels in newspapers, among them in Cumhuriyet and Milliyet, under the pseudonym "Server Bedii". Some of these are about a gentleman thief named Cingöz Recai. Safa also contributed to the Yedigün magazine and Serdengeçti magazine.

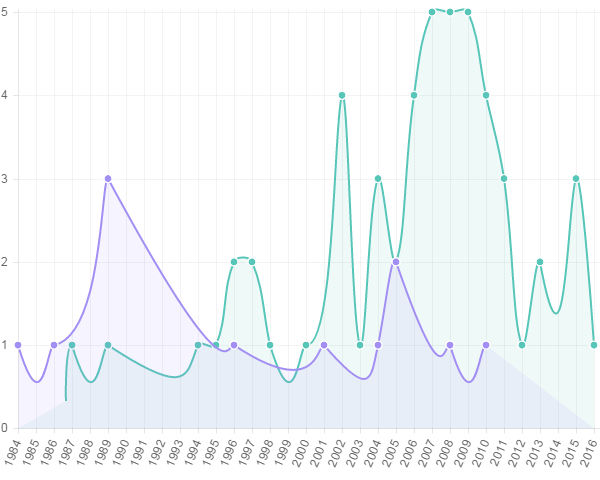
Academic studies about Peyami Safa by years in Turkey (1984-2016)

== Bibliography ==
He wrote 15 novels, excluding those written under pseudonym. He also wrote 17 non-fictions and 9 textbooks mostly about literature.

- Şimşek (1923) (Lightning)
- Sözde Kızlar (1923) (So-called Girls)
- Mahşer (1924) (Armageddon)
- Bir Akşamdı (1924) (It Was an Evening)
- Süngülerin Gölgesinde (1924) (In Shadow of Bayonets)
- Bir Genç Kız Kalbinin Cürmü (1925) (The Crime of a Young Girl's Heart)
- Canan (1925)
- Dokuzuncu Hariciye Koğuşu (1930) (Ninth External Ward)
- Fatih-Harbiye (1931)
- Atilla (1931)
- Bir Tereddüdün Romanı (1933) (The Novel of a Hesitation)
- Matmazel Noraliya'nın Koltuğu (1949) (The Armchair of Mademoiselle Noraliya)
- Yalnızız (1951) (We Are Alone)
- Biz İnsanlar (1959) (We People)

=== Play ===
- Gün Doğuyor (1932) (The Day Is Coming)

=== Other works ===
- Cumhuriyet Mekteplerine Alfabe (1929) (Alphabet to Republic Schools)
- Cumhuriyet Mekteplerine Kıraat (1929) (Reading to Republican Schools)
- Yeni Talebe Mektupları (1930) (New Student Letters)
- Büyük Mektup Nümuneleri (1932) (Great Letter Examples)
- Türk İnkılâbına Bakışlar (1938) (Perspectives on Turkish Revolution)
- Büyük Avrupa Anketi (1938) (Great Europe Survey)
- Felsefî Buhran (1939) (Philosophical Crisis)
- Türk Grameri (1941) (Turkish Grammar)
- Fransız Grameri (1942) (French Grammar) (It was expanded in 1948 as "Türkçe İzahlı Fransız Grameri" )
- Millet ve İnsan (1943) (Nation and Human) (It was expanded in 1961 as "Nasyonalizm")
- Mahutlar (1959)
- Mistisizm (1961)
- Sosyalizm (1961)
- Doğu-Batı Sentezi (1963) (East-West Synthesis)
- Objektif Serisi (8 Books) (1970–1976) (Objective Series)
- Hikâyeler (1980) (Stories)
