= Her Ay =

Literary magazine in Turkey (1937–1938)

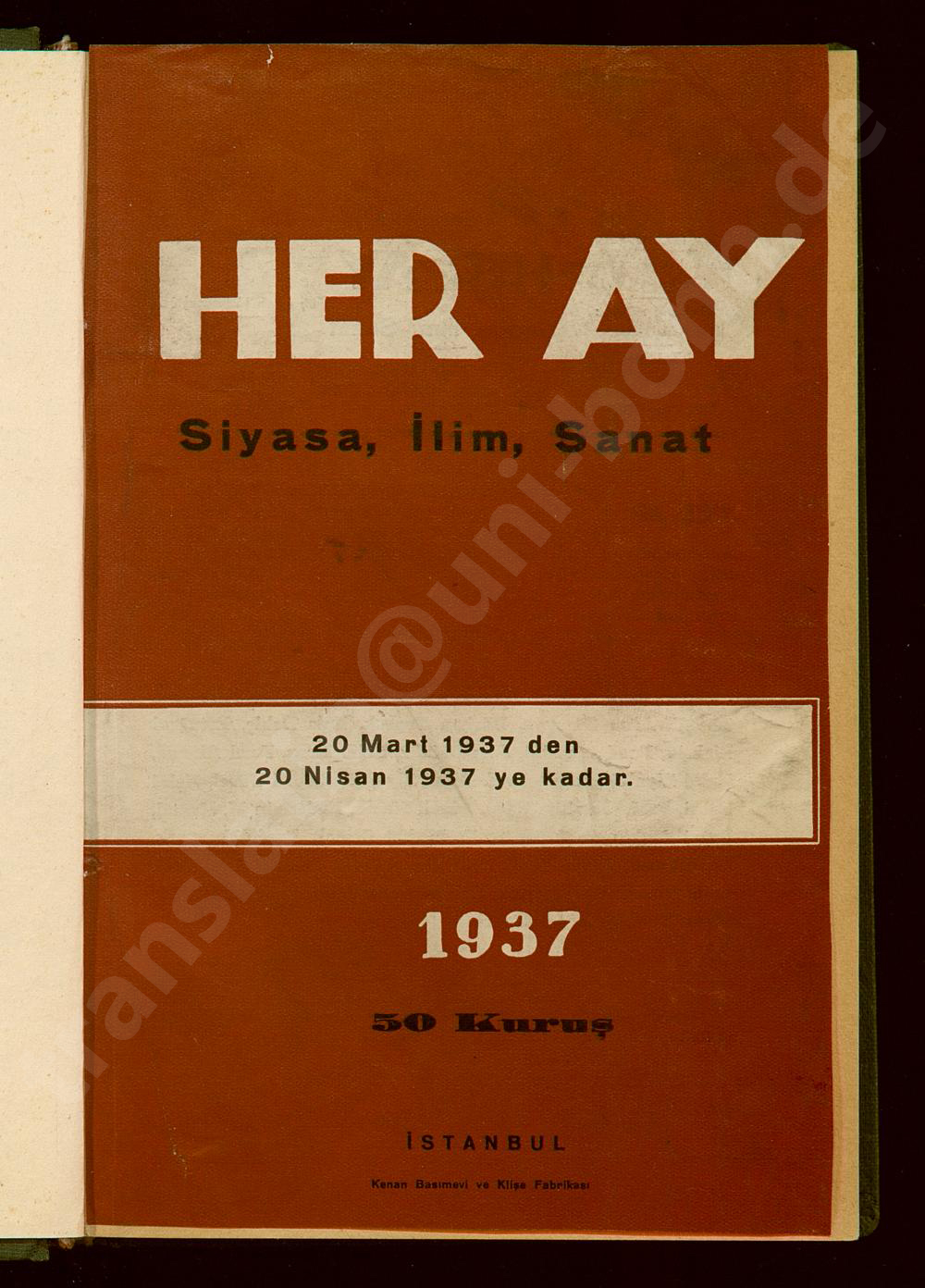
- Categories: Literary magazine
- Frequency: Monthly
- Founder: Orhan Seyfi Orhon; Yusuf Ziya Ortaç
- First issue: March 1937
- Final issue: March 1938
- Country: Turkey
- Based in: Istanbul
- Language: Turkish
- OCLC: 32104725

Her Ay (Turkish: "Every month") was a Turkish magazine published monthly in Istanbul between March 1937 and March 1938. It was established by Orhan Seyfi Orhon (1890-1972) and Yusuf Ziya Ortaç (1895-1967). A total of seven issues featured contributions from major Turkish writers, such as Hilmi Ziya Ülken, Mustafa Şekip Tunç (1886-1958), Hasan Ali Yücel (1897-1961), and Sabahattin Ali (1907-1948). Due to its content, the periodical is one of the most important of its time.
