= Suat Derviş =

Turkish author (1905–1972)

- Born: 1905; Istanbul, Ottoman Empire
- Died: 23 July 1972 (aged 66–67); Istanbul, Turkey
- Resting place: Feriköy Cemetery, Istanbul
- Occupations: Novelist, journalist, political activist
- Notable work: Fosforlu Cevriye (Radiant Cevriye, 1968)

Suat Derviş (1905–1972) was a Turkish novelist, journalist, and political activist, who was among the founders of the Socialist Women’s Association in 1970.

== Family and early career ==
Suat Derviş was born in 1905 in Istanbul into an aristocratic family. Her father, İsmail Derviş, was a gynecologist, and a professor at the Medical Faculty of Istanbul University. Her mother, Hesna Hanım, was the daughter of a slave girl in the entourage of Ottoman Sultan Abdülaziz. Suat had one sister, Hamiyet, who received a musical education at several conservatories in Germany. Her parents' relationship was monogamous, and they were described as a reliable family, who were supportive of Suat. As a child, Derviş used to wear a burqa.

Derviş received private tutoring in literature, music, French, and German. Between 1919 and 1920 she lived with her sister Hamiyet in Germany, and was a student at the Berlin University. She began to write about Turkey for German magazines, including Berliner Zeitung, and published her first book in 1920, titled Kara Kitap (Black book). She would go on to publish ten more novels between 1920 and 1932. Derviş’s early novels examined themes of gender, class, and women's psychology. They also often used an urban setting, which was unusual for the period she was writing in. A reviewer stated that "[Suat Derviş], who is more objective and modern than Halide Edib [the most famous woman writer of the time], is by no means less profound”. She also worked as a freelance journalist. Among the events she reported on was the Conference of Lausanne, at which the post-World War I fate of Turkey was decided. Her early novels have been referred to as the first gothic novels in the Turkish language.

== Early work ==
The Black Book, Suat Derviş's first novel, was published in 1921. In this work, which was met with astonishment and amazement in the literary world, she explained the inner voices and feelings of a beautiful and sensitive young girl who was condemned to death, indicating her desire to live until her last breath. she wrote the novel never written in 1923, Ne Ses Ne bir Nefes (1923), Bir Depression Night (1924), Fatma's Günahı (1924), Like Gönül (1928) and Emine (1931), the first work she wrote in Latin letters. followed. In these novels, she presented sections from the high-level life of Istanbul; talked about relationships; she examined the social position of women and the demand for freedom. Her first stories were translated into German in 1925.

== First journalistic experiences ==
Derviş was working in Alemdar newspaper when her first novel was published. She made her first interview with Refet Bey, who came to Istanbul in 1922 as the representative of the Ankara government, for the Alemdar newspaper. After a while, she left Alemdar and moved to İkdam and became a pioneer in this matter, preparing a women's page in the newspaper. During this period she also contributed to the women's magazine Süs.

== Paris years ==
When her husband, who was arrested again in 1951, started to stand trial in 1953, she left the country in case she was also arrested again; she settled down with her older sister in Sweden. She published articles in various newspapers and magazines in Europe; she wrote books to introduce herself abroad. She rewrote her novel For Zeynep under the name Ankara Prisoner. Her sister Hamiyet Hanım translated the novel into French. Published in 1957 as Le Prisonnier d'Ankara, the work was translated into eighteen languages and was so well received that it was found by critics even better than Ivo Andric's Bridge on the Drina. She translated his work Crazy Like, which he could not publish before, into French. The work was published in 1958 as Les Ombres du Yali (The Shadow of the Mansion).

== Return to Turkey ==
Derviş's father died in 1932, upon which she went back to Turkey. She became a member of several intellectual circles. She had joined Serbest Cumhuriyet Fırkası, a political party in the Turkish opposition, in 1930. Among other things, the party advocated for giving women the right to vote. At some point in the 1930s she unsuccessfully contested local elections. Her party was eventually banned, and Derviş herself became more influenced by Marxist thinking. She became a writer for Yeni Edebiyat (New literature).

Derviş continued to work as a freelance journalist; in 1935, she wrote about the Congress of the International Alliance of Women for Suffrage and Equal Citizenship (IAWSEC) in Istanbul for the daily paper Cumhuriyet (Republic), and in 1936 wrote about the Montreux Conference. While working for Cumhuriyet, she undertook a project of interviewing twelve international feminists, among whom was Dutch activist Rosa Manus. She traveled to the Soviet Union twice, and wrote a book about her experiences titled Niçin Sovyetler Birliği’nin Dostuyum? (Why am I a friend of the Soviet Union?). The book was highly controversial in Turkey.

== Leftist activism ==
Derviş had at least three marriages, to Selami İzzet Sedes, Nizamettin Nazif Tepedelenlioğlu, and to Reşad Fuat Baraner. Baraner was the leader of the Turkish Communist Party (TKP), which was banned at the time. On March 10, 1944, Derviş and her husband were arrested for "illegal communist activity" along with other members of the party. Derviş was sentenced to eight months in jail. Derviş, had been pregnant during the investigation, but had a miscarriage. Her husband remained in prison until 1950, and was arrested again in 1951. Due to her political views and her arrest, Derviş had difficulty finding a job, and took to using a pseudonym in her published work. Derviş left Turkey in 1953, as a result of continual harassment from the government.

Derviş lived in several countries outside Turkey during the period 1953–1963, mostly in France. She published novels in French during this time. Although well received in France, her work was controversial in Turkey due to her support for women's rights, which was often a matter of debate even among leftist individuals. She lived again with Baraner from 1963 until 1968, when he died. Derviş was among those who founded the Devrimci Kadınlar Birliği (Socialist Women’s Association), in 1970. The stated aims of the group were to create a revolutionary women’s movement and raise women’s consciousness. At the same time she published Fosforlu Cevriye (Radiant Cevriye, 1968), which explored the lives of marginalized women in Istanbul. It would prove to be her most popular novel, and was also adapted into a film, as well as a stage production in 2016. Derviş became known for her outspokenness in response to discriminatory statements made about her, once remarking "I am not ashamed of being a woman, and I am proud of being a writer. That title is my sole wealth, my only pride and my bread."

== Books ==
- Kara Kitap (1921)
- Ne Bir Ses Ne Bir Nefes (1923)
- Hiçbiri (1923)
- Ahmed Ferdi (1923)
- Behire'nin Talibleri (1923)
- Fatma'nın Günahı (1924)
- Ben mi (1924)
- Buhran Gecesi (1924)
- Gönül Gibi (1928)
- Emine (1931)
- Hiç (1939)
- Çılgın Gibi (1934)
- Yalının Gölgesi (1958)
- Fosforlu Cevriye (1968)
- Ankara Mahpusu (1968; it was first published in French in 1957. It was first published in English in 2024 as The Prisoner of Ankara. ISBN 978-1-59051-028-5.)

== Death and legacy ==
Suat Derviş died in Istanbul on 23 July 1972. She was buried at Feriköy Cemetery.

Her legacy became more prominent in the 1990s and 2000s, as more researchers grew interested in it. She was the subject of a biographical book titled Bir Kadın Bir Dönem: Suat Derviş (A Woman, A Period: Suat Derviş) by Jewish-origin Turkish author, Liz Behmoaras.
