= Cingöz Recai =

- Created by: Server Bedii (Peyami Safa)

In-universe information
- Species: Human
- Gender: Male
- Occupation: Gentleman thief
- Nationality: Turkish

Cingöz Recai (English: Recai the Shrewd) is a fictional character in a series of books created by the well known Turkish author Peyami Safa in 1924. In addition to his novels of high literary value, Safa also wrote detective fiction using the pseudonym Server Bedii.

== Main plot ==
Cingöz Recai resembles French fictional character Arsène Lupin. He is a gentleman thief, who steals from the rich. In most stories, his fiancé Jale also helps him. Mehmet Rıza (like Lupin's Justin Ganimard) is a police commissioner, who is always on the track of Recai. However, Recai manages to escape. In a fiction written in 1928, Recai acts versus Sherlock Holmes, and in another fiction written in 1935, he is at work against Arsene Lupin.

== Novels ==
Novels which are still being printed are the following.

- Arsene Lupin İstanbul'da (Arsene Lupin in İstanbul)
- Tiyatro Baskını (Raid of the Theatre)
- Elmaslar İçinde (Within the Diamonds)
- Kaybolan Adam (Missing Man)
- Esrarlı Köşk (Mysterious Villa)
- Zeyrek Cinayeti (Murder in Zeyrek)
- Şeytani Tuzak (Devilish Trap)
- Mişon'un Definesi (Mişon's Treasure)

== Films ==
From many fictions about Cingöz Recai, only three were filmed so far:

- Cingöz Recai (1954), international title The White Hell, directed by Metin Erksan. Cast: Turan Seyfioğlu as Cingöz Recai, Neriman Köksal as Jale, Avni Dilligil as Mehmet Rıza, the detective.
- Cingöz Recai (1969), directed by Sefa Önal. Cast: Ayhan Işık as Cingöz Recai, Sema Özcan as Jale, Süha Doğan as Mehmet Rıza, the detective.
- Cingöz Recai (2017), released on 12 October 2017 & directed by Onur Ünlü, produced by Hayri Aslan & the role of Recai was played by Kenan Imirzalioglu with Meriç Aral as Filiz, Meryem Uzerli as Göze, Boran Kuzum as Cüneyt and Haluk Bilginer as Chief Inspector and many others including Algi Eke, Serkan Keskin, Musa Uzunlar & Faith Artman.
