= Abdülhak Şinasi Hisar =

Turkish writer (1887-1963)

Abdülhak Şinasi Hisar (March 14, 1887 in Istanbul – May 3, 1963 in Istanbul) was a Turkish writer.

He spent his childhood in Rumeli Hisarı and studied at the Galatasaray High School and later political sciences in Paris. Back to Ottoman Empire, he worked for a French company and later for Stines Mining Company and Regie des Tabacs. He also contributed several publications, including Yedigün.

== Works ==
- Fahim Bey ve Biz (1941)
- Çamlıca’daki Eniştemiz (1944)
- Ali Nizami Bey’in Alafrangalığı ve Şeyhliği (1952)
- Boğaziçi Mehtapları (1942)
- Boğaziçi Yalıları (1954)
- Geçmiş Zaman Köşkleri (1956)
- Geçmiş Zaman Fıkraları (1958)
- Antoloji: Aşk imiş ..... (1955)
- İstanbul ve Pierre Loti (1958)
- Yahya Kemal’e Veda (1959)
- Ahmet Haşim : Şiiri ve Hayatı (1963)

== Biographies and information ==
- Orhan Pamuk – İstanbul – Hatıralar ve Şehir, 2003
- Louis Mitler - Contemporary Turkish Writers, Indiana University, Bloomington, 1988
- Necmettin Turinay: Abdülhak Şinasi Hisar, 1988
