= Yedigün =

Weekly illustrated magazine in Turkey (1933–1950)

- Editor: Sedat Simavi
- Categories: General interest magazine
- Frequency: Weekly
- Publisher: Sadri Etem Ertem (1933–1937); Sedat Simavi (1937–1950)
- Founder: Sedat Simavi
- Founded: 1933
- First issue: 15 March 1933
- Final issue: 1950
- Country: Turkey
- Based in: Istanbul
- Language: Turkish

Yedigün (Turkish: Seven Days) was a weekly illustrated general interest magazine which existed between 1933 and 1950 in Istanbul. It was one of the first publications in its category in Turkey. Sedat Simavi, a prominent Turkish journalist, was the founder and editor of the magazine of which the motto was Yedigün is the ornament of each home.

== History and profile ==
Yedigün was first published on 15 March 1933, and its founder and editor was Sedat Simavi. Sadri Etem Ertem was the founding publisher and owner of the magazine until 1937 when Simavi acquired it. Ertem designed Yedigün as a family-oriented magazine, targeting the Westernized elites, intellectuals, the bureaucrats and those living in cities. However, from 1937 Yedigün began to target youth and young adolescents. Then, the magazine was modeled on the German weekly Die Woche (German: The week) and the French magazine 7 Jour (French: Seven Days). It was published in a broadsheet format and covered both color and black and white pages.

Yedigün became one of the most popular publications and enjoyed higher levels of circulation selling 54,000 copies particularly in the period 1937–1948. It was one of two publications which represented the Republic of Turkey at the Balkan Print and Publication Congress portraying the urban modernism in 1938. The other one was Yeni Adam (Turkish: New Man) which displayed the rural modernism in Turkey.

Yedigün was closed down by Sedat Simavi in 1950 after producing 911 issues.

== Content and contributors ==
Yedigün had a wide range of contributors, including Ercüment Ekrem Talu, Nurullah Ataç, Peyami Safa, Ahmet Hamdi Tanpınar, Abdülhak Şinasi Hisar, Cemal Nadir Güler and Hüseyin Cahit Yalçın. The magazine published articles on politics, travel and relationships focusing on modernity and interviews with notable figures of the period. Yedigün published an interview with Seniha Hanım, wife of Cemal Paşa, in 1934.

The magazine presented a modernist projection for the Turkish family and home decor. In addition, it frequently featured short stories and novels, including Sedat Simavi's work, namely Nankörlerin Romanı (Turkish: The Novel of the Ungrateful; 1933). Halide Edib Adıvar's novel Yolpalas Cinayeti (Turkish: Yolpalas Murder) was serialized in Yedigün between 12 August and 21 October 1936 before its publication.
