= Cemal Nadir Güler =

Turkish cartoonist

- Born: 13 July 1902; Bursa, Ottoman Empire
- Died: 27 February 1947 (aged 44); Istanbul, Turkey
- Resting place: Zincirlikuyu Cemetery, Istanbul
- Occupations: Cartoonist, journalist
- Known for: Amcabey periodical
- Spouse: Melahat Güler

Cemal Nadir (13 July 1902 – 27 February 1947) was a Turkish cartoonist. Güler is the surname he assumed after the Surname Law of 1934.

== Biography ==
Cemal Nadir was born in Bursa, Ottoman Empire on 13 July 1902. His father Şevket was a calligraphist (Turkish: hattat) employed in courts. He completed the primary school in Bursa, and the junior high school in Bilecik. In 1923, he married Melahat (Güler). Cemal Nadir Güler died on 27 February 1947 due to bacteremia. He was buried at Zincirlikuyu Cemetery in Istanbul.

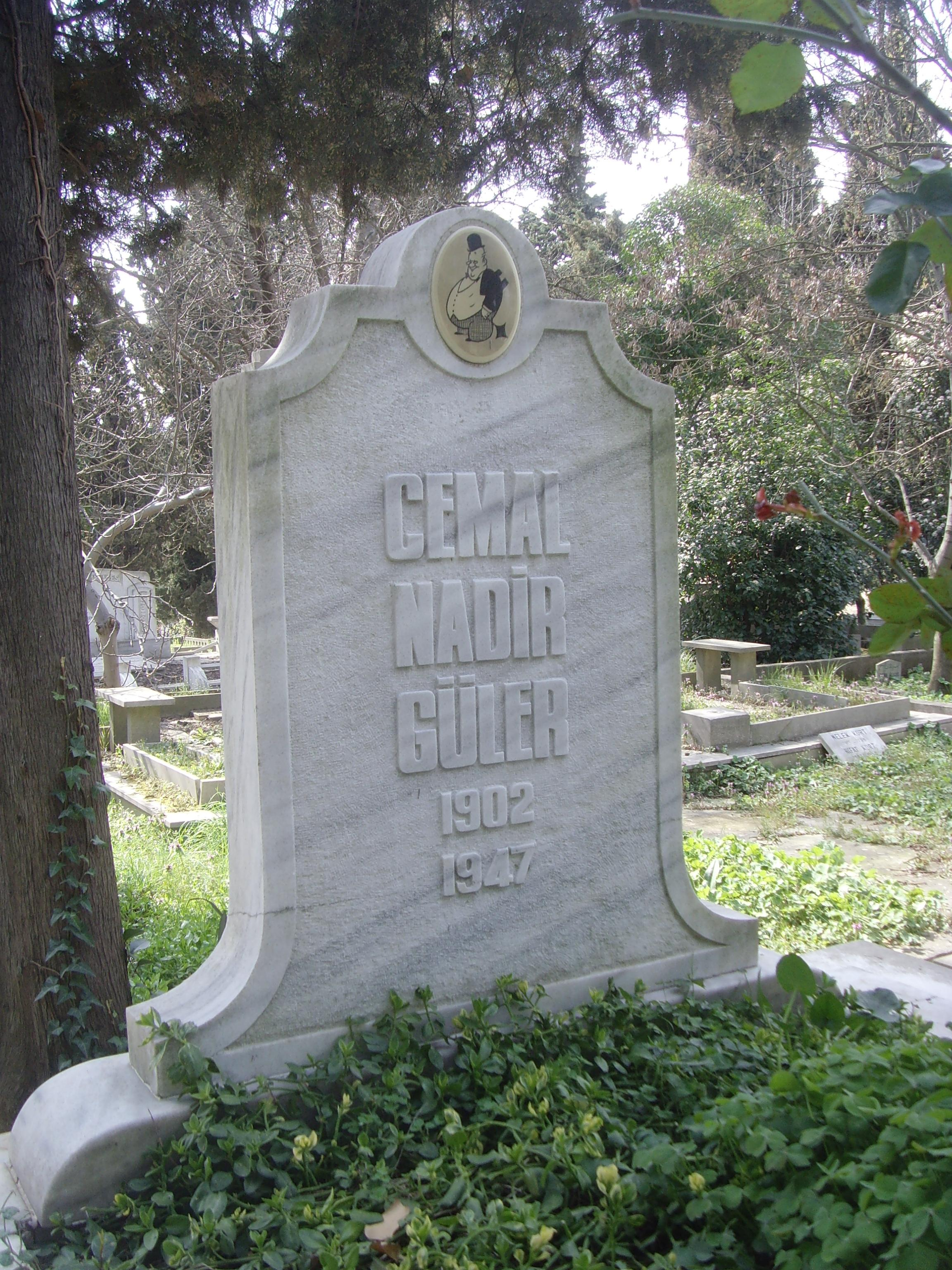
The grave of Cemal Nadir Güler at Zincirlikuyu Cemetery, Istanbul

== Career ==
After finishing high school, he began working as a sign painter in Bursa. He also created cartoons, and his first cartoon appeared in Diken (literally: "The Thorn") periodical. Although he moved to İstanbul and tried to be a full-time cartoonist, he could not make it and he returned to Bursa. The Alphabet reform of 1929 gave Cemal Nadir a second chance to show his talent. When Turkey adopted the Latin alphabet replacing the Ottoman Turkish alphabet in Arabic script, all sign boards were necessarily changed, and he worked hard to meet the demand. The same year, he moved once more to İstanbul to work for the daily Akşam. Later, he also drew for the newspaper Son Posta, as well as for the satirical magazines such as Akbaba. He also contributed to Yedigün. During this period, he published the satirical magazine Amcabey. During World War II, he drew anti-Nazism cartoons in the daily Cumhuriyet. In 1946, Republican People's Party ( CHP) invited him to run for a seat in the parliament. However, he refused the invitation, he said that with political affiliation he would not be able to create cartoons.

== Cartoon characters ==
He created the following cartoon characters:

- Amcabey
- Ak'la Kara ("Black and White")
- Dede ile Torun ("The Grandpa and the Grandson")
- Dalkavuk ("The Sycophant")
- Yeni Zengin ("Nouveau riche")
- Salamon

He used these conflicting characters to criticize the social problems of that time in the country.

== Comic books ==
His comic book are the following:

- 1932: Amcabey'e göre
- 1933: Karikatür Albümü
- 1939. Karikatür Albümü
- 1940: Akla Kara
- 1943: Dalkavuk
- 1944: Seçme Karikatürler
- 1945: Harp Zenginleri
- 1946: Siyasi karikatürler
- 1946: Amcabey

== Legacy ==
After his death, two streets, one in İstanbul and one in Bursa, were named after him. A sculpture of him is erected in Bursa. 2002, which was his 100th anniversary of his birth, was declared as The Year of Cemal Nadir Güler by the "Cartoonists Association", and an annual international cartoon contest was established bearing his name.
