= Nurullah Ataç =

Turkish writer, poet and literary critic

- Born: Nurullah; 21 August 1898; Istanbul, Ottoman Empire
- Died: May 17, 1957 (aged 58); Istanbul, Turkey
- Education: Galatasaray High School
- Spouse: Leman
- Writing career
- Genre: Literary critic

Nurullah Ataç (21 August 1898 – 17 May 1957) was a Turkish writer, poet and literary critic.

== Life ==
He was born on 21 August 1898 in Istanbul, then the capital of the Ottoman Empire. He studied in the Galatasaray High School and the Faculty of Letters of Istanbul University. After his father's death in 1921, he began serving as a French teacher in various schools in Istanbul. After the proclamation of the Turkish Republic he also served in Ankara and Adana. In 1926 he married Leman Ataç. He was appointed as an official translator of the presidency. He also served as the chairman of the media branch of the Turkish Language Association.

Ataç contributed to several publications, including Yedigün and Adımlar. Due to his extensive involvement in the Turkish language reform and his creation of various neologisms, Geoffrey Lewis claimed that "Ataç's contribution to the vocabulary of present-day Turkish unquestionably exceeds that of any other individual".

He died on 17 May 1957 in İstanbul.

== In literature ==
Ataç is known as a productive writer with an excellent memory. He translated more than 70 books to Turkish. He wrote essays and poems using modern Turkish words (see Modern Turkish). He was a champion of inverted sentences in his writings In his critics he was often relentless. His books are the following:

- 1946 – Günlerin Getirdiği (Brought by the days)
- 1952 – Sözden Söze (From word to word)
- 1953 – Karalama Defteri (Sketchbook)
- 1954 – Ararken (While searching)
- 1954 – Diyelim (Lets say)
- 1957 – Söz Arasında (During the talks)
- 1958 – Okuruma Mektuplar (Letters to my reader)
- 1960 – Günce (Diary)
- 1961 – Prospero ile Caliban (Prospero and Caliban)
- 1962 – Söyleşiler (Interviews)
- 1972 – Günce 1–2 (Diaries 1–2)
- 1980 – Dergilerde (In the periodicals)

== See also ==
- Necmettin Hacıeminoğlu
