= Karaoğlan =

Publication information
- First appearance: 1962
- Created by: Suat Yalaz

In-story information
- Species: Human
- Partnerships: Baybora, Balaban, Camoka

Karaoğlan is a Turkish historical comic book that was created in 1963 by Suat Yalaz. It was first published on January 3, 1962 daily in Akşam newspaper. Karaoğlan was started to be published by Yalaz as a separate comics magazine on April 1, 1963; and was continued to be published by various publishers until 2002.

== Synopsis ==
The comic's story takes place between the 12th and 13th centuries in Central Asia during the reign of Genghis Khan. The main character, Karaoğlan, is a young Uygur Turkic adventurer who worked as a scout in Genghis Khan's army. Karaoğlan is portrayed as a 23-year-old adventurous and brave youngster. He is nomadic and travels throughout Eurasia in his stories. He traveled as far as China, India, Constantinople and Siberia. He is accompanied by his faithful friend Balaban, an ex-captain in the Mongolian army and his father Baybora. His nemesis is Camoka, a Mongolian bandit who raids villages with his men.

Karaoğlan has an interesting origin story. His mother was killed in a tribal blood feud and his father (which he will reunite with years later) Baybora had to run while Karaoğlan was just a baby. He was raised by a woodsman. Because he was never officially named with a ritual by his father (this was the tradition in those times) the boy remained nameless. The woodsman called him "black boy" (karaoğlan) because of his long black hair.

Suat Yalaz based his stories on Turkish history and folklore. He was faithful to the language and daily life of that era. Because it originally started as a daily newspaper comic strip, stories were focused for a mature audience with serious issues of war, politics, history and eroticism. Humor is also an important part of stories. Characters are never portrayed as two-dimensional heroes or villains. The socio-political aura of 1960s and 1970s Turkey is also reflected in Yalaz's stories.

== International publishing ==
Karaoğlan is the first Turkish comic book to be published internationally. After Yalaz moved to France, Karaoğlan was published in Paris with the title of "Kebir" for seven years. Kebir comic books got successful and began distribution to French-speaking regions of Europe and Canada, as well as north African countries like Algeria, Tunisia, Morocco etc. The Kebir comics started publishing as monthly, then turned to bi-weekly. This success brought new editions of Kebir comics in English and Arabic (in Iraq under the title "Desert Eagle" at the end of the 1970s). A Russian edition with the title "БОЭКАШИ" (Bozkashii) was also planned by the French publishers but later was canceled.

== List of adventures ==
1. Asya Kaplanı
2. Baybora'nın Oğlu
3. Altay'dan Gelen Yiğit
4. Semerkand Casusu
5. Buzlu Çöller Tilkisi
6. Yeşil Ejder
7. Kanlı Saltanat (Uğursuz Saltanat)
8. Bizanslı Güzel Vasiliya
9. Tek Gözlü Albız
10. Asya'yı Titreten Korku
11. Samara-Şeyhin Kızı
12. Ötügen'in Üç Atlısı
13. Sarı Bayrak
14. Yavru Düşman
15. Çöl Şeytanı
16. Ölüm Yoldaşı
17. Bizanslı Zarba
18. Şeytan'ın Çakalları
19. Çayır Korsanları
20. Dokuz Tuğlu Kahraman
21. Uzun Saçlı Kahraman
22. Gökçe'nin Baykuşu
23. Cengiz Han'ın Habercisi
24. Bağan Tigin
25. Ergenekon
26. Kızıl Kule
27. Tiyen-Şan Canavarı
28. Kılıçların Gölgesinde
29. Ölüm Süvarileri
30. Uygur Güzeli
31. Sarı Büyü
32. Camoka'nın İntikamı
33. Alamut Kalesi
34. Kurt Başlı Sancak
35. Tibet Fedaisi
36. Ölüm Geçidi
37. Yeşil Gözlü Dilber
38. Kanlı Tuzak
39. Kudüs İlahesi
40. Üç Gözlü Mabut
41. Kırbaç Altında
42. Gök Han'ın Mirası
43. Kafkas Çiceği
44. Kaplan'ın Adaleti
45. Ulah Han'ın Gazabı
46. Dağlar Benimdir
47. Dağlar Benimdir 2
48. Fedailer Alayı
49. Bozkurt Gelini
50. Kara Panter
51. Kara Panter 2
52. Cengiz'in Gazabı
53. Cengiz'in Gazabı 2
54. Her Kılıç Bir Kın İçin
55. Hind Yıldızı
56. Dünyalar Hakimi
57. Dağlar Fatihi
58. Camoka'nın dönüşü
59. Deniz Ejderi
60. Düşman Uyumaz
61. Sarı Baltuk Hocanın Sırrı
62. Suruç Dağlarında
63. İnsan Avı
64. Ötügen'in Dört Atlısı
65. Acuna Bedel Oğul
66. Selçuklunun Şeref Sözü
67. Tumanbay'ın Gelini
68. Kayıp Ülke
69. Fırat'ın Sahipleri
70. Mor Kahküllü Şehzade
71. Ullimalı Kanlı Sultan
72. Çin Duvarlarında Dehşet
73. Demir Maske
74. Çakal Adamlar
75. Bir Ölümcül Oyun Bozkaşi
76. İnce Yılan Hanı
77. Kul Bakay'ın Mezarı
78. Banı Çicek
79. Ya Devlet Başa Ya Guzgun Leşe
80. Delice'nin 4 Kızı

== Adaptations ==
Karaoğlan was first adapted to movie by Suat Yalaz as writer, director and producer in 1965. Yalaz searched for a long period for the actor to play Karaoğlan and found a young, (then) unknown theater actor from Ankara, Kartal Tibet. Yalaz and Tibet made five movies from 1965 to 1967, which brought great fame to the actor. Suat Yalaz replaced Tibet with Kuzey Vargın in 1969 movie Karaoğlan-Samara the Daughter of Sheik. In 1972 Tibet returned to the role for a last time in Karaoğlan Geliyor, which was directed by Mehmet Aslan.

Year	Film	Director	Actor
1965	Karaoğlan - Altay'dan Gelen Yiğit (The Hero From Altai)	Suat Yalaz	Kartal Tibet
1966	Karaoğlan - Baybora'nın Oğlu (The Son of Baybora)	Suat Yalaz	Kartal Tibet
1966	Karaoğlan - Camoka'nın İntikamı (Revenge of Camoka)	Suat Yalaz	Kartal Tibet
1967	Karaoğlan - Bizanslı Zorba (Tyrant of Byzantium)	Suat Yalaz	Kartal Tibet
1967	Karaoğlan - Yeşil Ejder (The Green Dragon)	Suat Yalaz	Kartal Tibet
1969	Karaoğlan - Samara Şeyhin Kızı (Samarra Daughter of Sheik)	Suat Yalaz	Kuzey Vargın
1972	Karaoğlan Geliyor (Karaoğlan is coming)	Mehmet Aslan	Kartal Tibet

Karaoğlan was also adapted for television as a mini-series in 2002. Series was directed by Cem Akyoldaş and Erdogan Engin. Kaan Urgancıoğlu played Karaoğlan, and Baybora was played by Serdar Gökhan. On June 24, 2010, in a TV interview Yalaz mentioned his new Karaoğlan movie project which is early stages of development. The new movie was released in 2013, starring Volkan Keskin as Karaoğlan, Hakan Karahan as Baybora, Müge Boz as Bayırgülü, and Hasan Yalnızoğlu as Camoka. The movie is directed by Kudret Sabancı.
