= Turkish Journalists' Association =

The Turkish Journalists' Association (Turkish: Türkiye Gazeteciler Cemiyeti, TGC) is an association for journalists in Turkey.

It was founded on 10 June 1946, shortly after the abolition of the Turkish Press Union (Türk Basın Birliği), membership of which had been required by law for journalists. Past chairmen include Nail Güreli.

It awards the Sedat Simavi Awards annually to recognize Turkish journalists' achievements in a variety of categories, in honour of TGC co-founder Sedat Simavi.

Established in 1988, the TGC Press Media Museum in Çemberlitaş, Fatih, Istanbul is owned by the Association.
