= Suat Yalaz =

Turkish comic book artist (1932–2020)

- Born: 1 January 1932 Çiçekdağı, Kırşehir, Turkey
- Died: 2 March 2020 (aged 88) Istanbul, Turkey
- Area: Artist
- Notable works: Karaoğlan; Son Osmanlı Yandım Ali

Suat Yalaz (1 January 1932 – 2 March 2020) was a Turkish comic book artist, foremost known as the creator of the character Karaoğlan. He has also produced films based on his creation.

== Early career ==
Graduated from Istanbul Academy of Fine Arts, Yalaz began working as a cartoonist in Turkish press and his chef d'œuvre Karaoğlan began to be published in the daily Akşam in 1962, later to be published as a comics magazine by 1963.

== French works ==
In 1970, Yalaz settled in France where he created two French language Arab adaptations/spinoffs of Karaoğlan; Changor (1971) for Éditions de Lutèce and Kébir (or Kébir l'invincible; first series 1971 - 1975, second series 1975 - 1977) for Société Française de Presse Illustrée, which were destined for Maghreb readers and had considerable reception particularly in Algeria. He also created the Western comics series Ringo (1971 - 1972) and Sony (1972 - 1974) for Société Française de Presse Illustrée.

=== Gi-Toro ===
Between 1979 and 1981 Yalaz used the pseudonym Gi-Toro for two magazines (Détective Strictement Privé and Super Flic) featuring the popular private investigator character Pat Magnum. A prolific comic book creator, he has also written and drawn a large number of adult comics and erotic comics, particularly in the 1980s under the same pseudonym (sometimes as Jimmy Toro) for several French magazines, which include African Love (re-released in series Sex Negros and Eros Negro), Emma (Anna from 1980 to 1982), Futurella, Kora, Lady Sex, Lovisex, Sadissimo, Satanika, Satarella, and Sylvia.

== Later career ==
In 2002 he was named Turkish cartoonist of the year. He wrote the comic that was adapted into the film Son Osmanlı Yandım Ali in 2006. His later work involved the script for a new Karaoğlan film planned for release in 2013.
