= Ersin Karabulut =

Turkish comic book author (born 1981)

- Born: 3 June 1981
- Awards: (2022)

Ersin Karabulut (born 3 June 1981) is a Turkish comic book author.

He became popular with his comics column titled Sandık İçi, first published on Penguen magazine and later on Uykusuz, of which he was a founder. He publishes his comics in Turkey and abroad. Çizgili Tişört and Yeratı Öyküleri are his most important comics.

== Biography ==
Karabulut was born on 3 June 1981 in Istanbul to teacher parents. He has a sister four years his senior. His interest in comics began in his childhood. He attended Bayrampaşa primary school and the Vatan Anatolian secondary school. His first cartoon was published at the magazine Pişmiş Kelle when he was 16. His columns were also published in the same magazine for a while.

He entered the Mimar Sinan Fine Arts University, Faculty of Fine Arts, Department of Graphic Design. Karabulut started drawing for Lombak magazine, where he did the comics titled Yeraltı Öyküleri (Underground Stories), and then for Penguen magazine where he did the popular column titled Sandık İçi (Inside the Chest). His first book was published in 2005 under the name Sandık İçi.

In August 2007, he left Penguen with a group of illustrators such as Yiğit Özgür and Memo Tembelçizer, to launch a new magazine, Uykusuz, on 5 September 2007. In it, he continues his Sandık İçi column. From time to time, he also draws different stories such as Sevgili Günlük, Amatör, Yeraltı Öyküleri instead of Sandık İçi, and continues to publish his drawings in books. He published the books Sevgili Günlük (2009), Sandık İçi 2 (2011) and Amatör (2012), which are the continuation of the Sandık İçi series.

In 2016, Çizgili Tişört (Striped T-shirt), a suspense comic book, was published. Critics declare that Karabulut has brought a new life to comics with the work. After the 25 episodes of Çizgili Tişört, he continued for a while to draw the column Sandık İçi in Uykusuz. Sandık İçi 3 was released in 2017.

His drawings are published under the title Yeraltı Öyküleri ("Underground Stories") in the French magazine Fluide Glacial. He made three albums in French called Contes ordinaires d'une société résignée (2018), Jusqu'ici tout allait bien (2020) and Journal inquiet d'Istanbul, tome 1 (2022) created by the compilation of his works. Yeraltı Öyküleri was published in Turkish in 2021.

== Works ==
- Sandık İçi )(2005 - Doğan Kitap & 2009 - Mürekkep Yayınları)
- Korkma Ben Varım (Konuk Sanatçı) (« N'ayez pas peur, je suis là (artiste invité) ») (2009 - İletişim Yayınları)
- Sevgili Günlük (« Cher journal ») (2010 - İletişim Yayınları)
- Sandık İçi 2 (« Sur le cœur 2 ») (2011 - Mürekkep Yayınları)
- Amatör (« Amateur ») (2012 - Mürekkep Yayınları)
- Çizgili Tişört (« T-shirt rayé ») (2016 - Mürekkep Yayınları)
- Sandık İçi 3 (« Sur le cœur 3 ») (2017 - Komik Şeyler)
- Contes ordinaires d'une société résignée [in French] (2018 – Fluide glacial)
- Jusqu'ici tout allait bien... [in French] (2020 – Fluide glacial)
- Yeraltı Öyküleri (« Histoires souterraines ») (2021 - İnkılâp Kitabevi)
- Journal inquiet d'Istanbul, tome 1 [in French], éditions Dargaud, 2022
