= Yusuf Ziya Ortaç =

Turkish politician

- Born: 23 April 1895; Constantinople, Ottoman Empire
- Died: 11 March 1967 (aged 71)
- Citizenship: Turkish
- Education: Lawyer
- Alma mater: Ankara University
- Occupations: Writer, journalist

Yusuf Ziya Ortaç (23 April 1895 – 11 March 1967) was a Turkish poet, writer, literature teacher, publisher and politician.

He is from the group called Beş Hececiler in Turkish poetry and is one of the important humor writers of Turkish literature. Together with Orhon Seyfi, one of the members of the Beş Hececiler group, he introduced Akbaba, the political humor magazine, which has an important place in Turkish magazine history, and gained a large fan base with his articles in this magazine.

He is a politician who served as a Member of Parliament for Ordu Province.

== Biography ==
He was born in 1895 in Istanbul, Beylerbeyi district. His father is engineer Süleyman Sâmi Bey, son of Hoca Hasan Efendi, one of the notables of Konya, and his mother is Huriye Hanım, the daughter of İzzet Bey from İzmir.

He studied at Vefa High School in Istanbul. He started poetry in high school with the prosody meter. His first poem was published in Kehkeşan magazine in 1914. When he met with Abdullah Cevdet Bey, he started to send poems to İçtihat magazine. Thanks to his poems published in içtihad, he managed to get himself accepted as a poet. After his family moved to Bebek district, Yusuf Ziya, who was a neighbor to Rıza Tevfik Bey, met Ziya Gökalp through him. He started to write poems with the syllable meter upon the recommendation of Ziya Gökalp. Gecenin Hamamı, his first poem written with syllabic meter, was published in Türk Yurdu magazine.

=== Armistice years ===
After graduating from high school in 1915, he passed the proficiency exam in Darülfünun-ı Osmani and became a literature teacher. He gave lectures at various schools. Continuing his literary activities on the other hand, Yusuf Ziya published his poem called Akından Akına in 1916. This book, written and printed at the request of the Minister of War, Enver Pasha, included twenty-two poems he wrote for the Army.

In 1918, he entered the field of satire and humor by writing humorous articles under the pseudonym Çimdik in Diken magazine published by Sedat Simavi, and published a poetry magazine named Şair which published between 12 December 1918 and 20 March 1919 when it folded due to the economic problems.

His book entitled Şen Kitap was published in 1919 and includes humorous poems. He published poetry books titled Şairin Duası and Aşıklar Yolu (Lovers Way), which includes eight poems on heroism and patriotism. In 1920, he published another poetry book Cenk Ufukları.

=== Akbaba magazine ===
On 7 December 1922, he started publishing the Akbaba humor magazine with Orhan Seyfi Orhon. Yusuf Ziya, whose name is identified with Akbaba magazine, becoming its editor-in-chief. He published humorous articles and poems under the nicknames Çimdik and İzci in the magazine. Although Akbaba had to suspend its publication due to the decrease in circulation after the transition to Latin letters in 1928 and political turmoil in the 1930s and 1940s, Ortaç continued to publish the magazine until his death.

=== Meşale and other magazines ===
In April 1928, he published a book called Yedi Meşale (Seven Torches) and published an art and literature magazine Meşale in order to keep together and encourage young people who entered the art life. The magazine was published between 1 July and 15 October 1928. It closed after the adoption of the new letters and the community disbanded.

While continuing to publish Akbaba, he published other short-lived magazines with Orhon Seyfi, including iki bacanak, Ayda Bir between 1935 and 1937, Her Ay, a politics and economics magazine launched on 20 March 1935, and Çınaraltı between 1941 and 1948.

=== Later years ===
Having served as a member of the Istanbul Water Management Board of Directors for a while since 1936, Ortaç published his books entitled Bir Selvi Gölgesi in 1938, and Kuş Cıvıltıları (Bird Chirps) in 1946. From time to time, he also produced stories and novels. He published popular works such as Kürkçü Dükkanı (1931), Şeker Osman (1932), Göç (1943) and Üç Katlı Ev (1953). He taught literature in a French high school in 1944–1945.

Ortaç, who left his teaching career, Çınaraltı magazine and Water Administration entered politics. He served as a member of Parliament for Ordu Province.

Following the end of his mandate, he returned to head of Akbaba again.

After 1950, he wrote mainly in humor, travel, memoir and biography genres rather than poetry. In 1962 he published another poetry book, Bir Rüzgâr Esti (Wind Blows). He died in Istanbul on 11 March 1967 and was buried in Zincirlikuyu Cemetery.

== Works ==
=== Poem ===
- Akından Akına (1916)
- Aşıklar Yolu (1919)
- Şairin Duası (1919)
- Şen Kitap (1919)
- Cenk Ufukları (1920)
- Yanardağ (1928)
- Bir Selvi Gölgesi (1938)
- Kuş Cıvıltıları (Çocuk şiirleri, 1938)
- Bir Rüzgâr Esti (1962)

=== Drama ===
- Binnaz (1918)
- Name (1918)
- Kördüğüm (1919)
- Nikahta Keramet (1923)

=== Long story ===
- Kürkçü Dükkanı (1931)
- Şeker Osman (1932)

=== Anthology and review ===
- Nedim (1932)
- Seyranî (1933)
- Halk Edebiyatı Antolojisi (1933)
- Faruk Nafiz: Hayatı ve Eserleri (1937)
- Ahmet Haşim: Hayatı ve Eserleri (1937)

=== Novel ===
- Dağların Havası (1925, manzum)
- Göç (1943, otobiyografik roman)
- Üç Katlı Ev (1953)
- Sarı çizmeli Mehmet Ağa (1956)
- Gün Doğmadan (1960)

=== Humor ===
- Beşik (1943)
- Ocak (1943)
- Sarı Çizmeli Mehmed Ağa (1956)
- Gün Doğmadan (1960)

=== Travel – Memory – Biography ===
- İsmet İnönü (1946)
- Göz Ucuyla Avrupa (1958)
- Portreler (1960)
- Bizim Yokuş (1966)
