= Güleryüz =

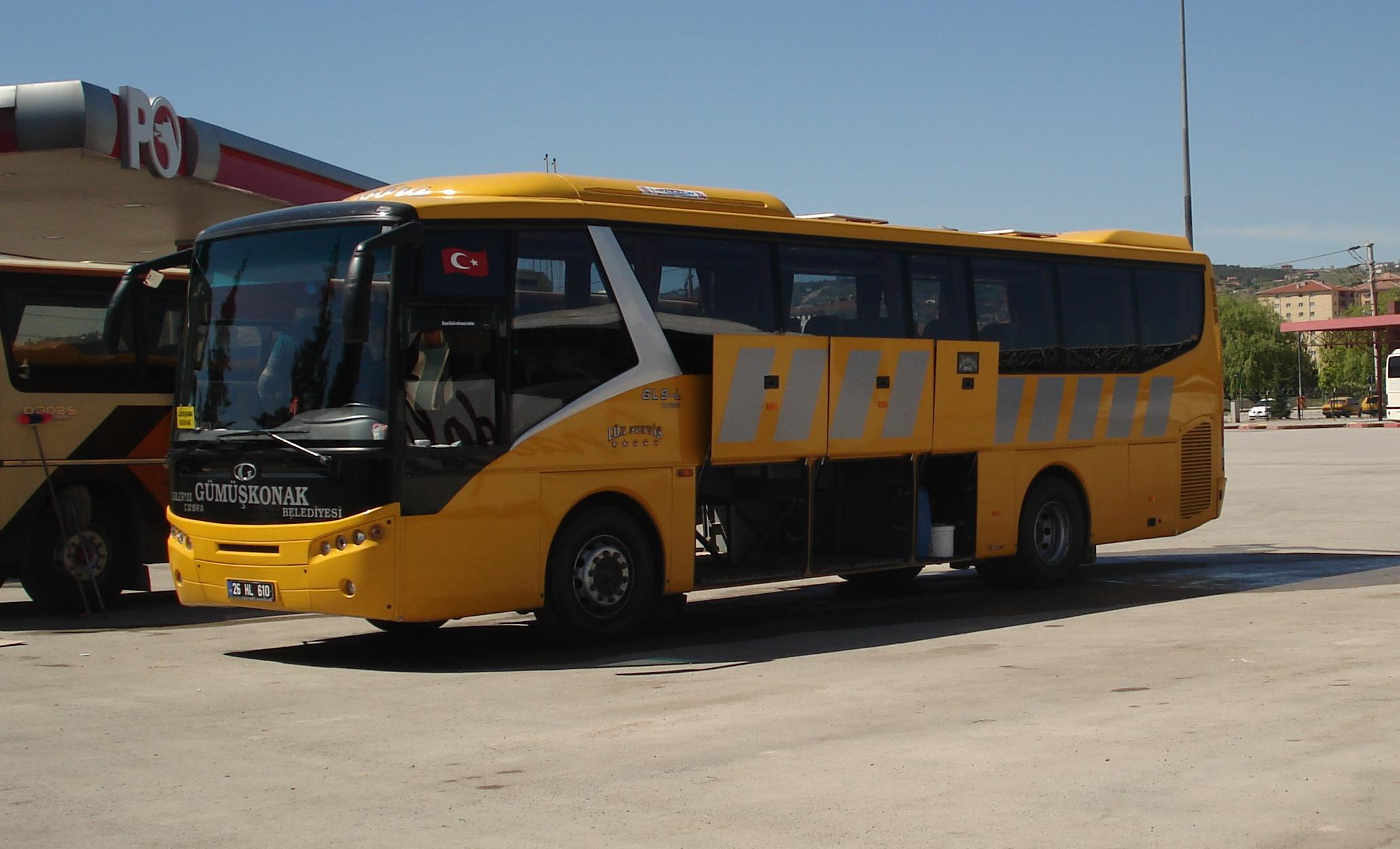
Güleryüz Cobra GL9 L

Güleryüz Karoseri Otomotiv Sanayi ve Tic. A.Ş, better known as Güleryüz, is a Turkish coachbuilder based in Bursa, which started the business by repairing coach bodies in 1967. The workshop run by a father and his three sons turned into a company in 1982. Some are electric buses.

== History ==
The company maintained its activities by manufacturing bus bodies on different chassis supplied by Mercedes-Benz, MAN, Renault, which were with engines installed on rear overhangs. At that time, such buses were manufactured for the needs of different state-owned organizations and private companies, as well as the armed forces.

In 1991, the company started the production of double-decker buses, using chassis supplied by Volvo and DAF. In 1993, manufacture of luxury coaches on 12- or 15 m-long chassis of Volvo and DAF began, and these coaches were exported to Lebanon, Saudi Arabia and Jordan.

At the beginning of 1999, the management of Güleryüz decided to continue with manufacturing of buses under the company's own brand, and in 2000, the production of Cobra buses with own brand and accumulated own assets started, recording significant success in a very short time. As of December 2007, the brand has established itself among the leading competitors for the inner-city transportation in Turkey.

In April 2006, the management of Güleryüz decided to expand production capacity, investing in a new facility covering a total area of 61,000 m^{2}, of which 28,000 m^{2} makes indoor space, where serial production has started in July 2007.

"Güleryüz" (Turkish) means "Smiling Face" in English, which makes an amusing naming of their major model as: "Smiling Face Cobra."

== Products ==
=== City buses ===
- Cobra GD 272
- Cobra GM 220
- Cobra GM 180
- Cobra Double Decker

=== Luxury buses ===
- Cobra GL 9
- Cobra GL 9L
