= Akbaba (periodical) =

Turkish humor magazine (1922–1977)

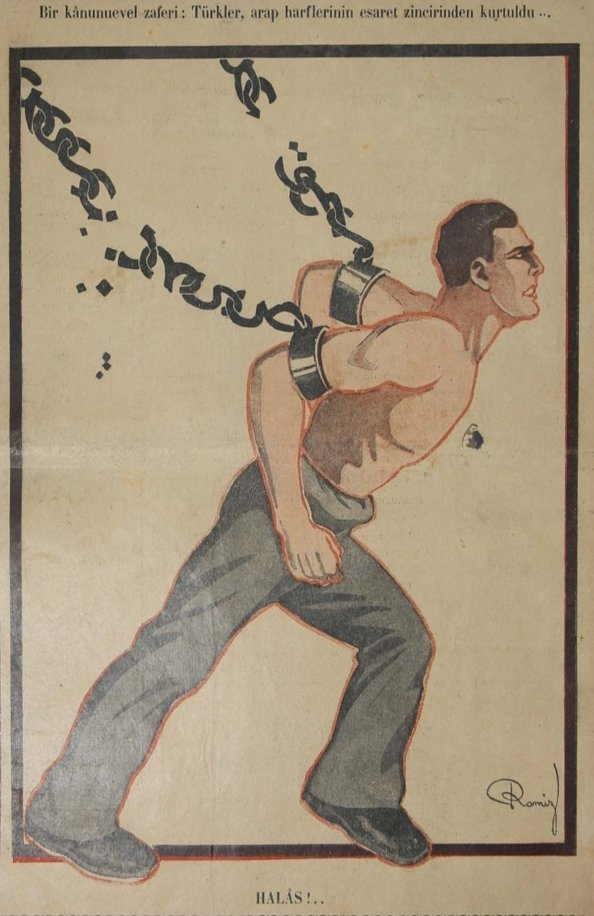
- an illustration from Akbaba, 1928
- Editor: Yusuf Ziya Ortaç
- Categories: Humor, Satire
- Frequency: Weekly
- First issue: 7 December 1922
- Final issue: 28 December 1977
- Country: Turkey
- Based in: Istanbul
- Language: Turkish

Akbaba (Turkish: Vulture) was a former satire and humor magazine published in Turkey. The title refers to the long life of the bird of prey. The magazine was headquartered in Istanbul.

== History ==
Akbaba was founded in 1922 by Yusuf Ziya Ortaç and Orhan Seyfi Orhon. The first issue appeared on 7 December 1922. Ortaç became the sole owner and publisher of the magazine after he bought the shares of Orhon. Ortaç died on 11 March 1967, and his son Engin Ortaç took over the magazine. Akbaba continued to be published until 28 December 1977. Its total publication term (including interruptions) lasted 55 years.

During the early years, it was published twice a week. By 1944, it became a weekly. Its early issues were in the traditional Arabic script. Following the introduction of the new Turkish Latin alphabet, it continued in the new Turkish script.

== Interruptions ==
Akbaba paused publication twice; in the 1931-1933 term and in the 1950-1951 term. But following both interruptions, it resumed publication. According to one view, during the one-party period Akbaba was a Republican People's Party (CHP) supporter, and it lost its readers, who supported Liberal Republican Party in the 1930s, and Democrat Party in the 1950s.

== Contributors ==
In addition to the publishers, prominent writers and poets, such as Reşat Nuri Güntekin, Peyami Safa, Nazım Hikmet Ran, Ercüment Ekrem Talu, Mahmut Yesari, Faruk Nafiz Çamlıbel, Cevat Şakir Kabaağaçlı, Vâlâ Nureddin, Aziz Nesin, Selami İzzet Sades and Muzaffer İzgü were among its writers.

Some of its cartoonists were Cemal Nadir Güler, Ramiz Gökçe, Necmi Rıza Ayça, Turhan Selçuk, Semih Balcıoğlu, Orhan Ural and Mustafa Uykusuz. Another one was Ratip Tahir Burak, a well-known Turkish cartoonist.
