= Güleryüz (magazine) =

Satirical magazine in Istanbul (1921–1923)

Güleryüz كولريوز (Ottoman Turkish)
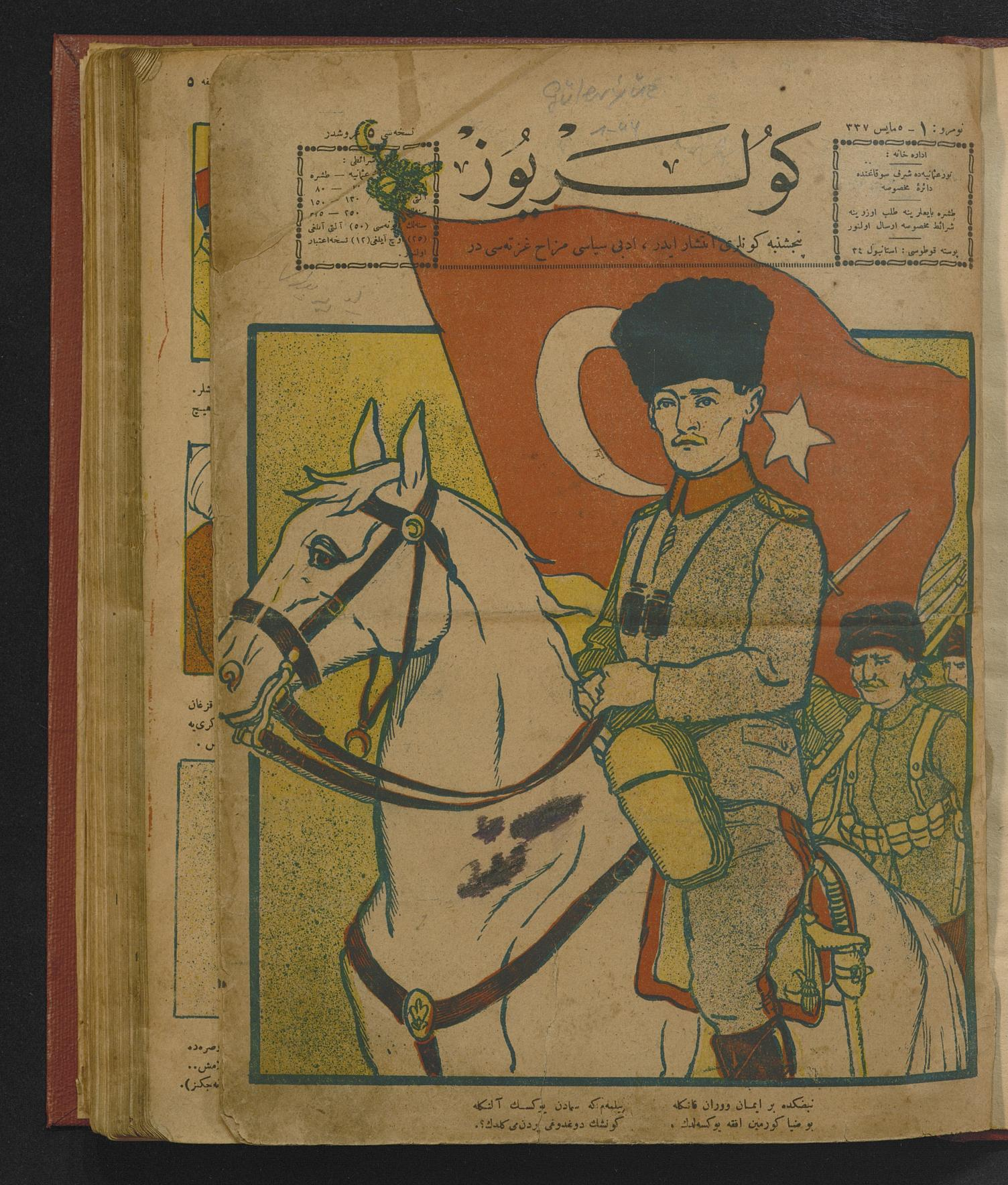
- Cover page of the first issue
- Editor: Sedat Simavi
- Categories: Satirical magazine
- Frequency: Weekly
- Founder: Sedat Simavi
- Founded: 1921
- First issue: 1921
- Final issue: 1923
- Country: Ottoman Empire (1921-1922); Turkey (1922-1923)
- Based in: Istanbul
- Language: Ottoman Turkish, Turkish
- Website: Güleryüz

Güleryüz ("laughing face" in Turkish; Ottoman Turkish: كولريوز) was an Ottoman Turkish satirical magazine that appeared in Istanbul weekly from 1921 to 1923 with a total of 122 editions. Its publisher and founder, Sedat Simavi (1896-1952), was a Turkish journalist, political cartoonist, writer and film director. He is also known as co-founder of the Turkish Journalists' Association (1946) and the daily newspaper Hürriyet (1948).

During the Turkish War of Independence (1919-1923), Güleryüz was the most influential humoristic magazine in Istanbul. It supported Mustafa Kemal Atatürk and frequently published his cartoons. Moreover, it publicly contributed to the assumption that the war could be won. Parts of its volumes were regularly censored.

Its texts and numerous caricatures were written and designed by Sedat Simavi himself. The contributors included Ahmet Rasim, Ercümend Ekrem, Fazıl Ahmed, Cevad Şakir and Mustafa İzzet.

As a counterpart and supporter of the Turkish government, the politico-humorous journal Aydede was founded in 1922.
