= Diken (magazine) =

Weekly satirical magazine in Ottoman Empire (1918–1920)

- Categories: Satirical magazine; Political magazine
- Frequency: Weekly
- Founder: Sedat Simavi; Zekeriya Sertel
- Founded: 1918
- First issue: 30 October 1918
- Final issue: 19 September 1920
- Country: Ottoman Empire
- Based in: Istanbul
- Language: Ottoman Turkish

Diken (Ottoman Turkish: Thorn) was a weekly satirical magazine which was published in the period 1918–1920 in Istanbul, Ottoman Empire. It was one of the publications which were founded by Sedat Simavi, a well-known Turkish journalist. The magazine was one of the first Ottoman satirical publications which featured color cartoons.

== History and profile ==
Diken was established by Sedat Simavi in 1918 as a bimonthly magazine. Zekeriya Sertel was another founder of the magazine. Istanbul was under the occupation of Allied forces following World War I when the first issue appeared on 30 October. Over time the frequency of Diken was switched to weekly. The magazine targeted the educated Ottoman intellectuals. Its focus was on the political criticism, and it did not overtly support the independence movement led by Mustafa Kemal Atatürk. It featured poems by Yusuf Ziya Ortaç and frequent cartoons. After producing 59 issues Diken published its final issue on 19 September 1920.
