= Sedat Simavi =

Turkish journalist (1896–1953)

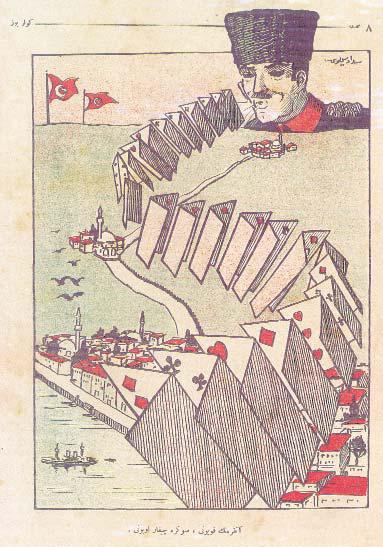
- "The Sheep of Ankara, shows its hand last." Political cartoon by Sedat Simavi, in Istanbul magazine Güleryüz in October 1922. In the Background: Ankara, In the Foreground: Istanbul
- Born: 1896; Constantinople, Ottoman Empire
- Died: 11 December 1953 (aged 57); Istanbul, Turkey
- Education: Galatasaray High School
- Occupations: Journalist, writer, film director

Sedat Simavi (1896 – 11 December 1953) was a Turkish journalist, writer and film director. He established many newspapers and magazines.

== Biography ==
Simavi was born in 1896. His grandfather and uncles served in different positions in the office of Ottoman Sultans. His parents were Halil Hamdi Bey and Aliye Hanım. He was granddaughter of Grand vizier Saffet Pasha. Simavi graduated from Galatasaray High School in 1912.

In 1916 Simavi started his first publication entitled Hande, a weekly women's magazine. Then he launched a satirical magazine, Diken and another women's magazine İnci. His first daily newspaper was Dersaadet which was established in 1920. The other papers established by Simavi included Payihat, Güleryüz, Yedigün and Resimli Gazete.

Simavi co-founded the Turkish Journalists' Association in 1946, and the Hürriyet newspaper in 1948. He was also a political cartoonist, and as well as plays and screenplays he also wrote a novel, Fuji-Yama (1944), and non-fiction books. He published around 60 books in total.

Sedat Simavi died on 11 December 1953, and was buried at Kanlıca Cemetery, in Istanbul.

== Legacy ==
The Sedat Simavi Literature Award, along with Sedat Simavi awards in other categories, is awarded annually by the Sedat Simavi Foundation since 1977. The Turkish Journalists' Association awards the Sedat Simavi Journalism Award.

== Filmography ==
- The Spy (1917, writer and director)
- The Claw (1917, writer and director)
- Alemdar Mustafa Pasa (1918, writer and director)
- Hürriyet apartmani (1944, writer)

== Books ==
- Muzaffer Gökman (1970), Sedat Simavi: Hayati ve eserleri. Hazirliyan, APA Ofset Basımevi
- Sedat Simavi (1973), Sedat Semavi / Eserleri [collected works]
