= List of magazines in Turkey =

The number of magazines began to increase from 1928 when the language reform was initiated. In 1941 the number of magazines published in Turkey was 227. Five years later it became 302 in 1946. Based on the data from the Radio and Television Supreme Council and the Turkish Statistical Institute there were a total of 4,058 magazines in 2012.

The following is an incomplete list of current and defunct magazines published in Turkey. They may be published in Turkish or in other languages.

== 0-9 ==
- 2000'e Doğru

== A ==
- Adam Sanat
- Adımlar
- Akbaba
- Akis
- Aksiyon
- Altüst
- Anadolu Mecmuası
- Ant
- Arayış
- Ateş hırsızı
- Atlas
- Aydede
- Azeri Turk

== B ==
- BAK
- Bayan Yanı
- Bilim ve Teknik
- Billboard Türkiye
- Birikim
- Bütün Dünya
- Büyük Mecmua
- Büyük Doğu

== C ==
- Cafcaf
- Cem
- Cep Dergisi

== Ç ==
- Çarşaf

== D ==
- Davetsiz Misafir
- Dergâh
- Diyojen
- Doğan Kardeş
- Dün ve Bugün

== E ==
- Ekonomist
- Elele
- Eskişehirspor Magazine
- Eşref
- Evim

== F ==
- Forum

== G ==
- Galatasaray
- Genç Kalemler
- Gırgır

== H ==
- Hanımeli
- Hareket
- Hayat
- Her Ay
- Hey

== İ ==
- İctihat
- İnsan

== K ==
- Kadın Gazetesi
- Kadınca
- Kadınlık
- Kadro
- Karagöz
- Kim

== M ==
- Marko Paşa
- Milliyet Çocuk

== N ==
- Nokta
- NTV Tarih

== O ==
- Ortam

== P ==
- Papirüs
- Penguen

== R ==
- Resimli Ay
- Resimli Perşembe
- Rodeo Strip

== S ==
- Sebilürreşad
- Serdengeçti
- Ses
- Sevimli Ay
- Socrates
- Süs

== T ==
- Tarih Dünyası
- Tempo
- Tercüme
- Türk Edebiyatı
- Türk Kadın Yolu
- Türk Kadını
- Türk Yurdu

== Ü ==
- Ülkü

== V ==
- Varlık

== Y ==
- Yaprak
- Yarım Ay
- Yazko Edebiyat
- Yedigün
- Yeditepe
- Yeni Adam
- Yeni Aktüel
- Yeni Dergi
- Yeni Gündem
- Yeni Kafkasya
- Yeni Ufuklar
- Yurt ve Dünya
- Yön

== See also ==
- List of newspapers in Turkey
