= Vâlâ Nureddin =

Turkish writer – pen name Va-Nu (1901–1967)

Ahmed Vâlâ Nureddin
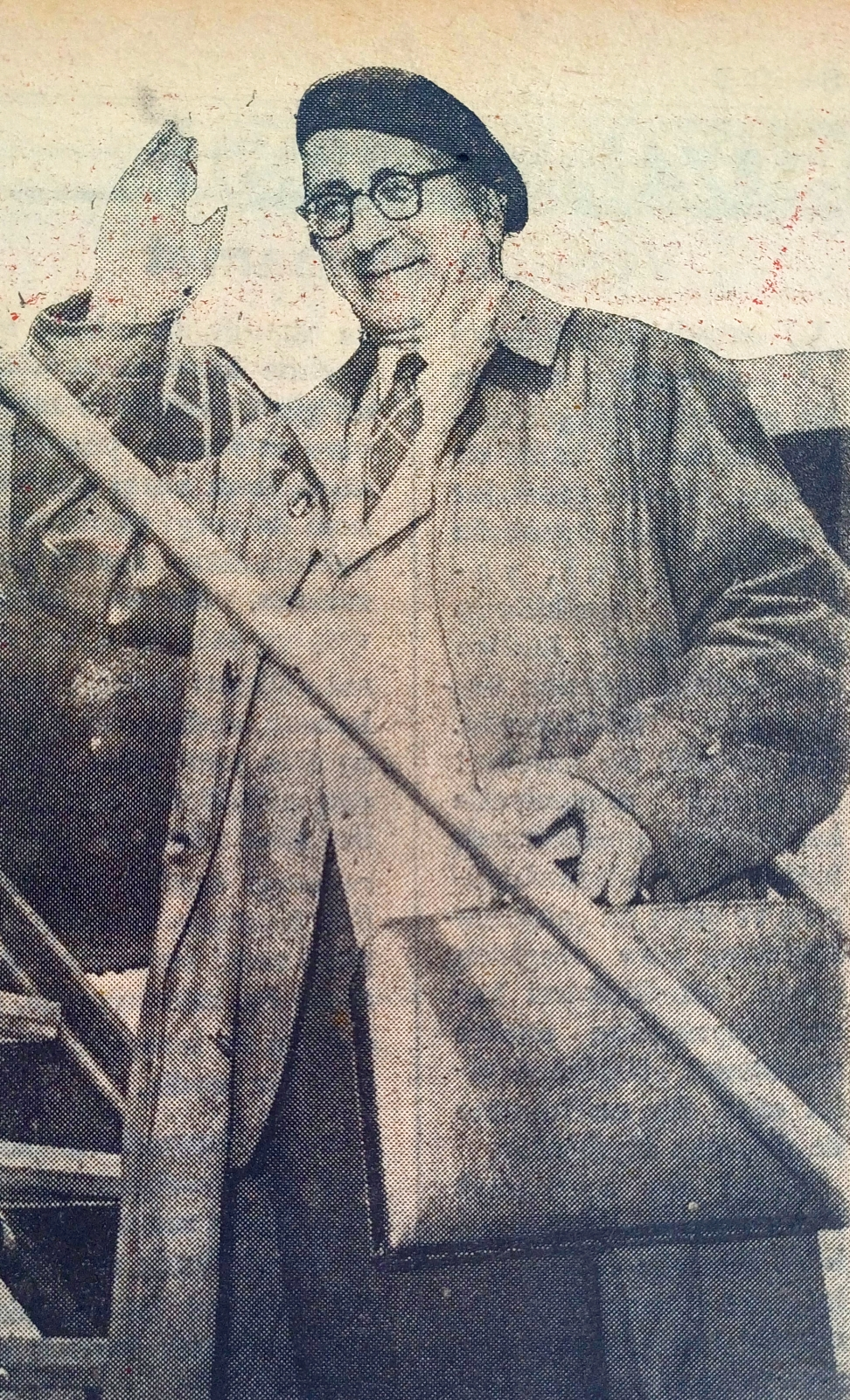
- Vala Nureddin (In the Akşam newspaper dated May 21, 1953)
- Born: 1901; Beirut
- Died: 1967 (aged 65–66)
- Education: Galatasaray High School, Vienna School of Economic
- Occupations: Journalist, writer
- Writing career
- Pen name: Va-Nu

Ahmed Vâlâ Nureddin (c.1901– died; 1967) was a Turkish writer and journalist, also known under his pen name Va-Nu.

== Early life and education ==
Vala Nureddin was born in Beirut, as a son to a Vali of Beirut, but his birth was registered in Constantinople as there the citizens wouldn't have to serve in the military. Vala moved to Constantinople, where he attended the Galatasaray high school between 1911 and 1916. He then settled to Vienna, Austria-Hungary where he enrolled in the Vienna School of Economics, focusing on financial studies. By 1917, he was in Istanbul and employed at the Türkiye Millî Bankası and the Ministry of Finance. He was not satisfied with what he did and therefore began to write and publish poetry. In 1921, Vâlâ and Nazim Hikmet, attempting to join the Kemalist forces in the Turkish War of Independence, went to Inebolu at the Black Sea. But their communist views were not popular among the Kemalist forces, so they moved on to the Soviet Union.

== In the Soviet Union ==
They initially travelled to Batumi, but by 1922, they were staying in the Oriental Hotel in Tiflis. There they made contact with the Turkish linguist Ahmet Cevat Emre. Later, both Nazim and Vala lived together with Emre in the Hôtel de France in Batumi at the Black Sea where Emre offered them to write for the newspaper Yeni Dünya. As the political situation became dire due to the relations Nazim and Vala maintained with Pan-Turanists willing to create a Turkish state from Edirne to China, the social family decided to leave the Hotel and went to live in the house of Emres printer. There the social family was joined by Şevket Süreyya Aydemir, who'd stay with the three others until the late 1920s. Between 1922 and 1925, the four friends went to Moscow where Emre was offered a job as a Professor for Turkish language at the Oriental Institute of the University of Moscow, and the four kept having a common household in the Hotel Lux. Vala enrolled in the Communist University of the Workers of the East, where he and Hikmet were introduced to Marxism-Leninism and additionally occupied lessons in French and Russian. By the end of his studies he taught as well. In 1923, he developed a health issue which caused him to be sent for some weeks to a sanatorium in Caucasus.

== Return to Turkey ==
Having returned to Turkey in 1925, he began to write for a variety of newspapers mostly using his pen name Va Nu but at times also writing under a pseudonym. During his journalistic career in Turkey he wrote for newspapers like Yeni Sabah, Cumhuriyet, Yeni Gün. He was one of the contributors of Resimli Perşembe, a weekly literary magazine founded and edited by Sabiha and Zekeriya Sertel, between 1925 and 1929. He wrote articles for the Akşam from 1927 until 1966 with an interval between 1933 and 1939.

== Personal life ==
Nureddin was married twice. His first wife was Meziyet Çürüksulu, who he married in 1932, but became a widower as she died in 1939. Then he married his second wife Müzehher, who was also a journalist. As he lived in a social family together with Nureddin and Hikmet in Georgia, he would teach Turkish to Azerbaijani, Hikmet wrote articles and poems while Emre was in charge of cooking.

== Works ==
He translated several works from Russian, English, or French to the Turkish language and was the biographer of Nazim Hikmet.
