= Yeşil Yaprak =

- Editor: Mehmet Sadık Aran
- Founder: Mehmet Sadık Aran
- Founded: 16 June 1928
- Final issue: 1 September 1928
- Country: Turkey
- Based in: Istanbul
- Language: Turkish

Yeşil Yaprak (Ottoman Turkish: یشیل یاپراق) a journal published in 1928 by Azerbaijani political refugees living in Turkey.

== About ==
The journal of Yeşil Yaprak, published on June 16, 1928, was the third journal published by Azerbaijani refugees. It was less significant in terms of volume and influence compared to the journals Yeni Kafkasya and Azeri Turk. The journal's address was listed as follows: Istanbul, Hilali-Əhmər street, across from Hagia Sophia. It was published by the "Orkhaniyya" press. The first article in the journal is titled "Ten years behind us." The second issue was released on July 5, 1928. The journal consisted of 8 pages and its final issue was published on September 1, 1928. Mehmet Sadık Aran was the chief editor of the journal. Additionally, signatures of Erdoğan and Sisyanlı were also found in the journal.

In the header section of the journal, the statement "Published every 15 days with the pen of industrious Azerbaijanis, it is a public, political, independent nationalist magazine" is included.

=== Purpose ===
In the article "Yolumuz" published in the first issue of the Yaşıl Yarpaq journal, the purpose of the journal is stated in the following words:

Today, another small journal enters the life of the press. In this journal, which comes to the agenda with the assistance of young Azerbaijani writers, shortcomings may be observed. Our journal will strive to eliminate the shortcomings it allows through the goodwill and kindness of its esteemed readers. Yeşil Yaprak is published to convey the sorrows of the unfortunate Azerbaijan living under the chain of oppression to the watching world, which has been ignited by tragedy for years.

Under pressure from the Soviet leadership, just like the journals Yeni Kafkasya and Azeri Turk, the Yeşil Yaprak journal was also closed shortly after its short-lived publication. Since there were no changes in the editorial team, the main topic of the journal was the pressure of the Soviet leadership not only on the Russians but also on other nationalities, and this situation was seriously criticized by the journal.

In the article titled "On Years Behind Us," featured in the first issue, the changes in the past ten years since Azerbaijan gained independence in 1918 are explained:

"Having broken the century-old chain of oppression to achieve freedom and independence, the Azerbaijani Turks' declaration of independence marked its tenth anniversary on May 28th of the past year. Only those who witnessed the event can truly appreciate how this declaration was made in a challenging period after passing through difficult stages. Despite all its losses, the four million-strong Turkish Azerbaijan managed to restore its usurped rights against the hundred million-strong Russian masses and earned the honor of establishing the first national and civil Turkish republic with all the conditions and innovations of the century."
