= Sertel =

Sertel is Turkish surname. People with the surname include:

- Atilla Sertel (born 1956), Turkish politician and journalist
- Cemali Sertel (born 2000), Turkish football player
- Sabiha Sertel (1895–1968), Turkish journalist
- Zekeriya Sertel (1890–1980), Turkish journalist
