= Azerbaijan emigrant literature =

Azerbaijan emigrant literature (Azerbaijani: Azərbaycanın mühacirət ədəbiyyatı) is one of the branches of Azerbaijani literature.

== Background ==
At the beginning of the XIX century, such political and cultural figures as Syed Nigari, Sadi Garabagi, Sebati, Seraji, etc. were in exile.

== Stages ==
The development of Azerbaijani emigrant literature can be divided into 4 stages:

=== Stage I (1909-1920) ===
The foundations of Azerbaijani emigrant literature were laid in 1909-1910. During these years, the tsarist government carried out various reforms in the Caucasus, as a result of which control over the activities of the intellectuals of Azerbaijan was tightened. Ali bey Huseynzade, Ahmed bey Aghayev, Mammad Amin Rasulzadeh, Mahammed Hadi, and others were among prominent intellectuals. During his stay in Iran, Mammad Amin Rasulzadeh started publishing the first newspaper with European standards in the East - "Irani-Novin". Rasulzadeh published his own articles, poems, and translations in this newspaper. Forced to leave for Turkey in May 1911 under pressure from the Russian embassy, Rasulzadeh published a series of articles titled "The Turks of Iran" in the magazines like "Turk Yurdu" and "Sabilurrashad". Ali bey Huseynzade and Ahmed Aghayev, who lived in Istanbul at that time, also worked in various media agencies and societies: "Turkic Hearth", "Ittihad and Taraggi", etc.

=== Stage II (1920-1941) ===
The second stage of emigration began with the fall of the Azerbaijan Democratic Republic. At this stage, covering the 1920s-1941s, along with political figures of Azerbaijan, dozens of intellectuals, scientists, writers were forced to leave the country: Alimardan bey Topchubashev, Jeyhun Hajibeyli, Mirza Bala Mammadzadeh, Almas Ildirym, Abdulvahab Yurdsever, Kerim Oder, Ahmed Jafaroglu, Abbasgulu Kazimzadeh, Muhammedali Rasuloglu, Huseyn Baykara, Mamed Sadigov, Ummulbanu (Banin) and others.

This stage of emigrant literature is also diverse in genres: poetry, prose, literary criticism and journalism.

A number of works by Ummulbanu, such as "Nami" (1943), "Days of the Caucasus" (1945), "Days of Paris" (1947), "Meeting with Ernst Junker" (1951), "Then" (1961), "Alien France" (1968), "Call of the last hope (1971), and "Ivan Bunin's last move" have become part of French prose.

The artistic heritage of Samad Agaoglu is mainly collected in the books "Memories of Strasbourg", "Zurriyat", "Teacher Gafur", "Big Family", "Man in a Cage", "Soviet Russian Empire", etc. A special place in the research of Ahmed Jafaroglu, an Azerbaijani literary critic, is occupied by studies on ancient Turkic written monuments, problems of folklore studies, literary studies, classical and modern Azerbaijani literature. He was the editor of the magazines "Turk Amaji", "Azerbaijan yurd bilgisi", "Turkish language and literature", published by the Istanbul University.

=== Stage III (1941-1979) ===
The third stage of Azerbaijani emigrant literature is mainly associated with the period of the Great Patriotic War. The works of the writers of this period were published in the German newspaper "Azerbaijan", as well as in the Turkish press. Suleiman Takinar, Abay Dagly, Abdurrahman Fatalibeyli (Dudenginsky), Alazan Baijan, Muhammad Kengerli, Majid Musazadeh, etc. were among distinguished writers and publicists of the period. At this stage, the memoir genre is particularly developed: "Memories of a quarrel with Stalin" (M. A. Rasulzadeh), "Life has passed" (Surekya Aghaoglu), "Memories of the war for independence of Azerbaijan" (Nagi Sheikhzamanli), etc.

=== Stage IV (1979 - modern period) ===
The last stage of emigration started from the formation of the Islamic regime in Iranian Azerbaijan (1979), as well as a number of political changes in the former Soviet Union (strengthening of the national liberation movement, "perestroika", "glasnost", etc.). After the restoration of independence in Azerbaijan in 1991, new centers and societies appeared in various countries inhabited by Azerbaijanis. The final stage of emigration is also associated with the large-scale development of the press. If in previous years the Azerbaijani emigrant press covered mainly Turkey and European countries, currently the emigrant press is published in many countries of the world, from the United States of America to Japan.

A poetic heritage of emigration is represented by the names of Hamid Nitgi, Muhammedali Mahmud, Turhan Ganjavi, Gulamrza Sabri Tabrizi, Alirza Miyanaly, etc. Nurida Atashi, Azer Abilbeyli, Vugar Demirbeyli, etc. are Azerbaijani writers in exile.

In recent years, the connection of Azerbaijani emigrant literature with the emigrant literature of other Turkic peoples has been expanding.

== Department of Azerbaijani Emigrant Literature ==
The Department of Azerbaijani Emigrant Literature was established by decision of the Academic Council of the National Academy of Sciences of Azerbaijan dated July 4, 2013 (Protocol No. 4). The Department began its activity as a temporary structural unit on the basis of Order No. 82 of July 10, 2013. According to Decree of the Presidium of the National Academy of Sciences of Azerbaijan No. 21/6 dated October 17, 2013, the department was transformed into a permanent structural unit.

== See also ==
Azerbaijan emigrant press

== Bibliography ==
1. Tahirli Abid., Azərbaycan mühacirəti B., 2001
2. Sultanlı Vaqif., Azэrbaycan mühacirət ədəbiyyatı, B., 1998
3. Azərbaycan Demokratik Respublikası (məqalələr toplusu), B., 1990
4. Çəmənzəminli Y.V., Azərbaycan ədəbiyyatına bir nəzər, "Azərbaycan", 1989, No. 9-10
5. Cabbarlı, N., (2003), Mühacirət və klassik ədəbi irs. Bakı: Elm, 23.
6. Ağayef Ahmet. Türk Medeniyeti Tarihi, «Türk yurdu» dergisi (İstanbul), Yıl 2, sayı 40 (16 Mayıs 1329-29 Mayıs 1913); sayı 41 (30 Mayıs 1329-12 Haziran 1913); sayı 43 (27 Haziran 1329- 10 Temmuz 1913).
7. Akalın Gülseren. Türk düşünce ve siyasi heyatında Ahmet Ağaoğlu. 1999.
8. Ходасевич В. Литература в изгнании. Колеблемый треножник. М., 1991, с. 466.
