= Sevimli Ay =

Defunct Turkish literary magazine

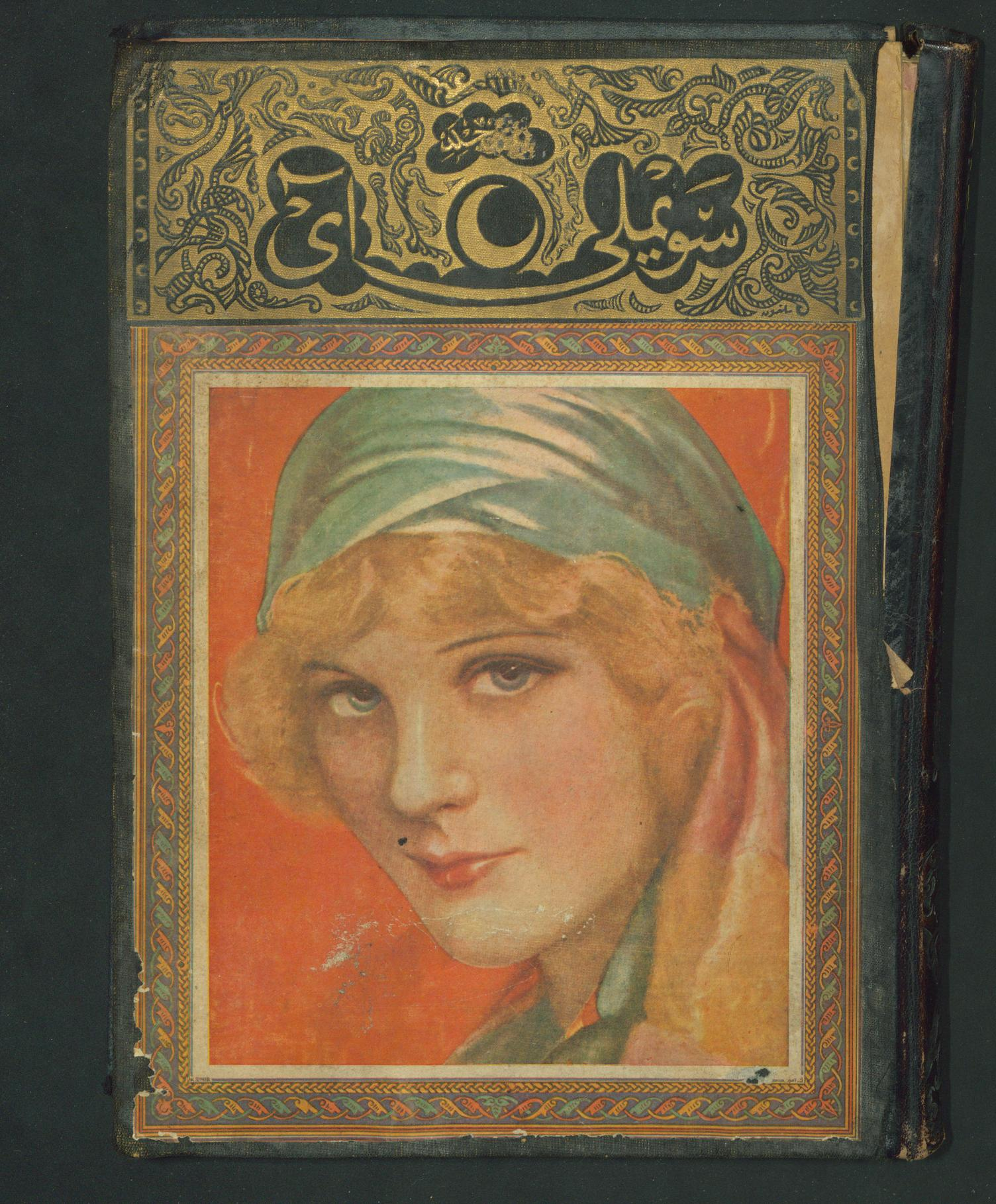
- Cover of first issue
- Editor: Sabiha Sertel
- Categories: Literature
- Frequency: Monthly
- Founder: Sabiha Sertel; Zekeriya Sertel
- Founded: 1926
- Final issue: 1927
- Language: Ottoman Turkish
- Website: Sevimli Ay

The Ottoman-Turkish magazine Sevimli Ay (Ottoman-Turkish:سويملى آى; DMG: Sevīmlī Ay; English: "Lovely Moon") was published in Istanbul from 1926 to 1927 and was the temporary title of the magazine Resimli Ay (1924-1938). The editorial management consisted of the journalists Sabiha Sertel and her husband Zekeriya Sertel, also general director for press of the new republic and founders of the predecessor Resimli Ay. Influenced by their study visit to the United States, together with other influential intellectuals they wanted to contribute to improving of the political and economic living conditions - especially of Turkish woman and to the intellectual education of the Turkish population. The magazine was thus a publication organ for the socialist and avant-garde requirements of the 1920s.

Zekeriya Sertel's critical attitude towards the Turkish state within the framework of the republican movement led to his arrest in May 1925, which resulted in the takeover of the financial and editorial management as well as the production of the magazine by his wife Sabiha Sertel. In 1926 the journal was censored by state and was published under its new title Sevimli Ay for the following two years. Like its predecessor, Sevimli Ay was published monthly and consisted of a total of twelve issues, each with about fifty large-format pages. After Zekeriya Sertel's early release from prison, the journal continued to be published again under her original name Resimli Ay between 1927 and 1938 - from October 1928 also in the new Turkish Latin alphabet - with a few interruptions.

The publication, popular among the Turkish population, addressed socially relevant topics in the form of editorials, opinion surveys, letters to the editor, short stories and poems as well as self-help articles. In addition to dealing with contrasting aspects such as child poverty and factory work versus nightclubs and dance trends, the role of the modern Turkish woman in particular played a major role. Glamorous illustrations in the style of Vanity Fair or Vogue were intended to draw a cosmopolitan public image of women and reflected the urban elite of Istanbul.
