= Resimli Perşembe =

Turkish weekly literary magazine (1925–1929)

- Editor-in-chief: Zekeriya Sertel; Sabiha Sertel
- Categories: Literary magazine
- Frequency: Weekly
- Publisher: Resimli Ay Press
- Founder: Zekeriya Sertel; Sabiha Sertel
- Founded: 1925
- First issue: 28 May 1925
- Final issue: 14 March 1929
- Country: Turkey
- Based in: Istanbul
- Language: Turkish

Resimli Perşembe (Turkish: The Illustrated Thursday) was a Turkish language weekly magazine that existed between 1925 and 1929. The magazine is one of the many publications that were established and edited by the Turkish journalist couple, Sabiha and Zekeriya Sertel.

== History and profile ==
Resimli Perşembe was first published on 28 May 1925, and the founders were Sabiha and Zekeriya Sertel. It was published by Resimli Ay press weekly on Thursdays. Soon after the start of the magazine Zekeriya Sertel was arrested and tried in the Independence Courts which resulted in his three-year imprisonment. Therefore the magazine, which covered mostly literary and women-related articles, began to be managed by his wife Sabiha. Some of the magazine's contributors included Ahmed Rasim, Nahid Sırrı Örik, Münire Handan, Vasfi Samim and Vâlâ Nurettin. Sabiha Sertel had an advice column entitled Cici Anne (Turkish: Sugar Mama) in the magazine from its start in 1925 to its closure in 1929.

Resimli Perşembe produced a total of 199 issues before it ceased publication on 14 March 1929.
