= Azerbaijani emigrant press =

Azerbaijani emigrant press (Azerbaijani: Azərbaycan mühacirət mətbuatı) is one of the branches of the Azerbaijani press.

== History ==
Since September 26, 1923, the first sample of the Azerbaijani emigrant press - the magazine "Yeni Kafkasya" was published in Istanbul. The main objective of this magazine, published by the founder of the Azerbaijan Democratic Republic (ADR), Mammad Amin Rasulzadeh, was to support the struggle for national independence.

In the first twenty issues of "Yeni Kafkasya" the text was written in Arabic, in the next 10 - in Latin. The majority of works in the compilation was written in the journalistic genre.

In 1927, the publication of the magazine was suspended. However, the compilations "Azeri Turk" (1928-1930), "Yashil Yarpag" (1928), "Odlu Yurd" (1929-1931) and the newspaper "Bildirish" (1930-1931) continued to be published in Istanbul. The publication of these collections was also supervised by Mammad Amin Rasulzadeh.

Articles such as "Glorious memory of the Azerbaijani press" ("Yeni Kafkasya", 1926, No. 9), "Our way" ("Azeri Turk", 1928, No. 1), "Afghan Tragedy" ("Odlu Yurd", 1929, No. 1), "Cautionary tragedy" ("Odlu Yurd", 1929, No. 3), "Joint Caucasian Front" (1932, No. 12), "Turkey and Europe" (1932, No. 13), "Democracy and Soviets" (1932, No. 30), "In the Far East" (1933, No. 34), "The Ukrainian issue" (1933, No. 48), "General information about Azerbaijan" (1952, No. 9), "The Declaration of Independence of Azerbaijan" ("Birleshik Kafkasya", 1953, No. 5) were published in the "Istiglal" magazine.

There were also articles published by Azerbaijani researcher Mirza Mammadzadeh: "The eight-year journey" ("Yeni Kafkasya", 1926, No. 4), "Battle of Baku - victory on September 15" ("Yeni Kafkasya ", 1927. № 24), "31 March" ("Odlu Yurd", 1929, No. 2), "Mirza Fatali and the alphabet matter" ("United Caucasus", 1953, No. 3), "Independent Azerbaijan" ("Birleshik Kafkasya", 1953, No. 5), "Victory day" ("Birleshik Kafkasya ", 1953, No. 9), et cetera.

In addition to articles, Azerbaijani emigrants published a number of works: "The national movement of Azerbaijan" (M. Mammadzade, 1938), "Renewal movement in Azerbaijan in the XIX century" (H. Baykara, 1966), "The Iranian Revolution and the liberation movement" (H. Baykara, 1975), etc.

In the late 1980s and early 1990s, emigrant press entered a new phase of development.

Azerbaijani emigrants used to publish their works such countries as Turkey ("Azerbaijani Turks", "Khazar", Istanbul, 1990), Sweden ("Araz", Lund, 1991; "Azerbaijan", Stockholm), Great Britain ("Aydinlig", 1988, London; "Land of lights", 1988, Edinburgh), Germany ("Azer", Berlin, 1990; "Native Language", 1984, Bonn; "Savalan", 1967, Berlin, "Erk", 1975), Spain ("Dede Gorgud", 1988, Madrid), Belgium ("Emigrant", 1984, Brussels; "Fiery Motherland", 1992, Brussels), Russian Federation ("AzerRos", "Azerbaijan: XXI century", "Voice of the nation", "Azerbaijani diaspora", "Leisure", Moscow; "Azerbaijani media", Ivanovo; "Azerbaijan", Yekaterinburg; "Nasha gazeta", Kemerovo; "Yurd", Saratov;" Inam", St. Petersburg; "Azerbaijan", Vladivostok; "Derbent", Derbent), Estonia ("Hearth", Tallinn), Ukraine ("Savalan", Dnepropetrovsk; "Echo of Azerbaijan", "Voice of Azerbaijan", Kiev; "Nation", Simferopol), Moldova ("Araz", Chisinau).

== See also ==
- History of Azerbaijani press
