= Yarım Ay =

Yarim Ay
- Editor: Emin Refik Müslümoğlu
- Categories: Family magazine
- Frequency: Biweekly
- First issue: 1935
- Final issue: 1940
- Country: Turkey
- Based in: Istanbul
- Language: Turkish
- Website: Yarım Ay

Yarım Ay (Turkish: Yarım Ay, English: Half Moon), a family and youth magazine, was published in Istanbul between 1935 and 1940, usually on the 1st and the 15th of each month, having a total of 123 issues.

== Overview ==
The owner of the magazine was the Resimli Ay Matbaası T.L.S. which was also responsible for the printing, with Emin Refik Müslümoğlu as editor-in-chief. Among other topics, the magazine supported the women's emancipation as well as changes in lifestyle of that time, such as the transformation of male and female clothing in modern Turkey in the 1930s into a simple, secular style of dress according to Kemalist ideology.
