= Resimli Ay =

Monthly literary magazine in Turkey (1924–1938)

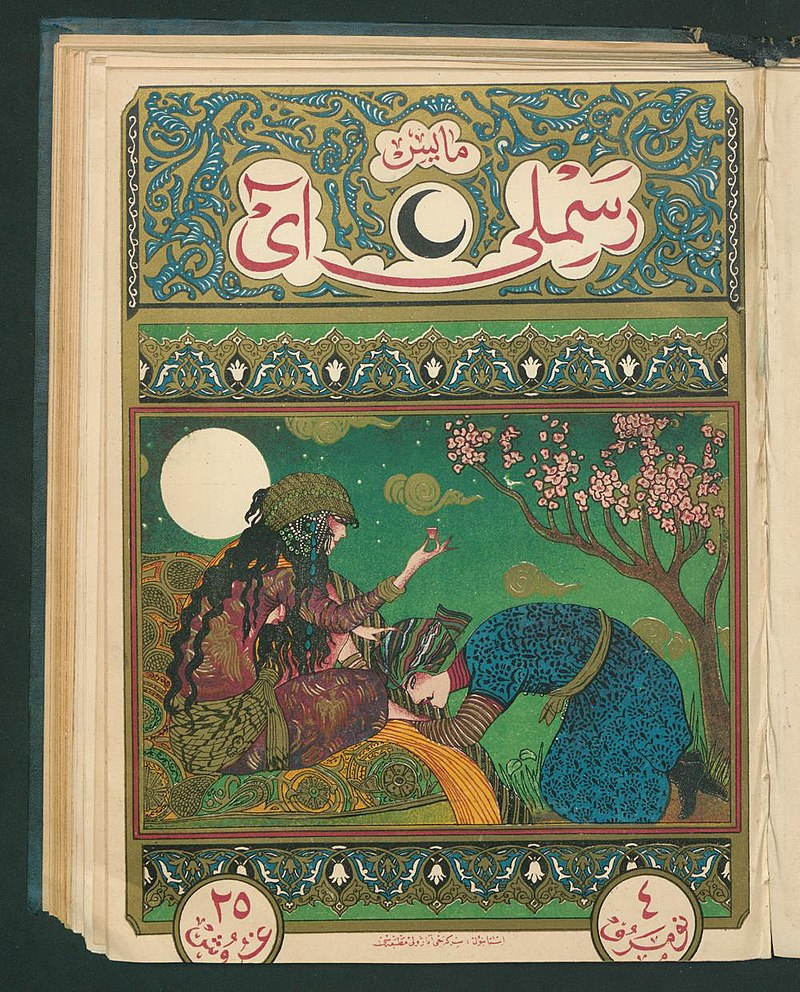
- Cover of the first issue
- Editor: Sabiha Sertel; Zekeriya Sertel
- Categories: Literature
- Frequency: Monthly
- Founder: Sabiha Sertel; Zekeriya Sertel
- Founded: 1924
- First issue: 1 February 1924
- Final issue: 1938
- Country: Turkey
- Based in: Istanbul
- Language: Ottoman Turkish
- Website: Resimli Ay

Resimli Ay (Ottoman Turkish: رسملى آى, romanized: Resimlī Ay, lit. 'Illustrated Moon, Illustrated Month') was an Ottoman-Turkish magazine published in Istanbul between 1924 and 1938. The first issue of the magazine appeared on 1 February 1924. Seven volumes with a total of 72 issues were produced during its existence. The magazine was founded by the journalist couple Zekeriya and Sabiha Sertel who studied in the US and wanted to contribute to improving the political and economic living conditions - especially of Turkish women and to the intellectual education of the Turkish population. The magazine was thus a publication organ for the socialist and avant-garde requirements of the 1920s.

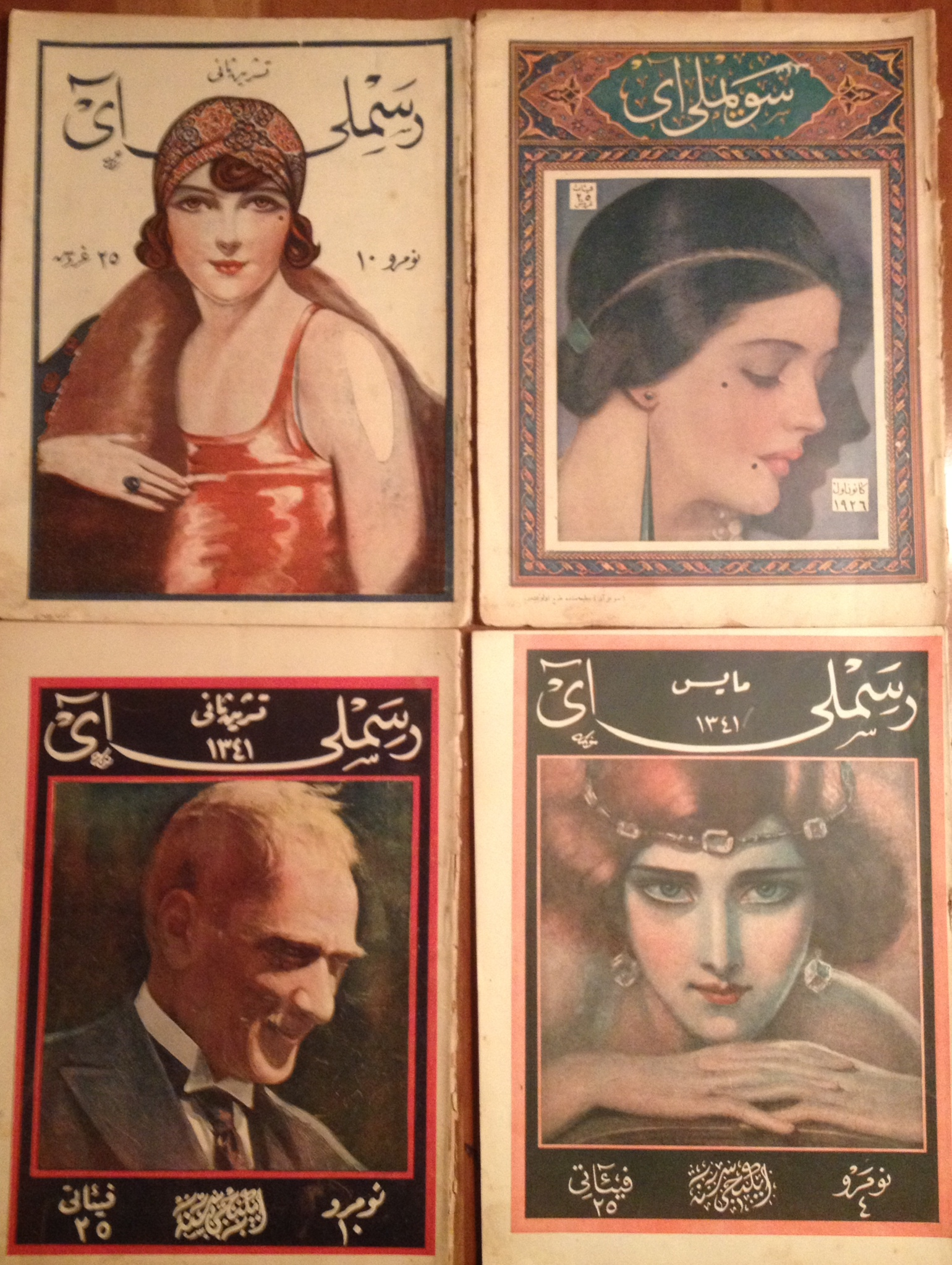
Resimli Ay

In addition to Sabiha and Zekeriya Sertel, the latter general director of the new republic and co-founder of the Istanbul daily Cumhuriyet, influential intellectuals such as Sabahattin Ali and Suat Derviş, as well as the Marxist-influenced poet Nazim Hikmet were among the authors. Zekeriya Sertel's critical attitude towards the Turkish state within the framework of the republican movement led to his arrest in May 1925, which resulted in the takeover of the financial and editorial management as well as the production of the magazine by his wife Sabiha Sertel. In 1926 the journal was censored by state and was published under the new title Sevimli Ay for the following two years. Between 1927 and 1938 the publication of the journal continued under its original title Resimli Ay - from now on in Latin scripture - with some interruptions.

At the beginning the magazine was published monthly. It contained around forty large-format pages per issue and costed 25 Kurus which made it five times more expensive than an average daily newspaper. Despite its high price, Resimli Ay became a popular publication among the Turkish population and dealt with social issues in the form of editorials, opinion surveys, reader's letters, short stories and poems as well as self-help articles. In addition to dealing with contrasting aspects such as child poverty and factory work versus nightclubs and dance trends, the role of the modern Turkish woman played a major role. Glamorous illustrations in the style of Vanity Fair or Vogue were intended to draw a cosmopolitan picture of women in public sphere and reflected the urban elite of Istanbul. Thus the first edition under the title "Bugünkü Türk Kadınlar" ("Turkish Women Today") was dedicated to the cosmopolitan woman of post-war period in Istanbul.

== See also ==
- List of avant-garde magazines
