= Kadınlık =

Ottoman-era women's magazin

- Editor: Nigar Hanım
- Categories: women's magazine
- First issue: March 1914
- Final issue: July 1914
- Country: Ottoman Empire
- Based in: Istanbul
- Language: Ottoman Turkish
- Website: Kadınlık

Kadınlık ("Womanhood" or "Femininity") was an Ottoman women's magazine published by Hacı Cemal and Nigar Cemal in Istanbul between March 1914 and July 1914. The magazine's editor-in-chief was Nigar Hanım. A total of twelve issues were published, consisting primarily of news, articles, short stories, pictures, and photographs. In addition, articles were printed that focus on the role of women in social life and topics such as education, fashion, tailoring, and hair care, as well as articles written by female intellectuals who were part of the Ottoman women's movement.

The self-proclaimed aim of Kadınlık was to change the way the women's world was viewed, to illuminate the horizons of womanhood, and to prepare a ground for their progress. It aimed at supporting women and proving knowledge so that they could attain the position to which they were entitled. The subtitle of the journal also states: "It defends the existence of womanhood and her position in the country."

Kadınlık forms an important source for understanding the women's movements of the time, which also occupies an important place among the women's publications of the constitutional era with its discourse on the social position of women and various socioeconomic aspects.
