= Cep Dergisi =

Literary magazine in Turkey (1966-1969)

- Editor-in-chief: Yaşar Nabi Nayır
- Categories: Literary magazine
- Frequency: Monthly
- Publisher: Varlık Publications
- Founded: 1966
- First issue: November 1966
- Final issue: March 1969
- Country: Turkey
- Based in: Istanbul
- Language: Turkish

Cep Dergisi (Turkish: The Pocket Magazine) was a monthly literary magazine which was one of the publications founded and published by the Turkish writer Yaşar Nabi Nayır. It was headquartered in Istanbul, Turkey. The subtitle of the magazine was Dünyaya Açılan Pencere (Turkish: The window opening up to the world).

== History and profile ==
Cep Dergisi was established by Yaşar Nabi Nayır in 1966, and its first issue appeared in November 1966. The magazine came out monthly. Its publisher was Varlık Publications which was owned by Nayır. Nayır was also the editor of the magazine. One of its goal was to introduce new trends in Western thought and literature. Therefore, most of its content included examples from contemporary world literature. The magazine featured translations of fiction and non-fiction articles from Western publications. Of them translations of fiction were mostly poems and short stories.

Cep Dergisi folded in March 1969 after producing 29 issues.
