= Cafcaf =

Turkish magazine

Cafcaf Mizah Dergisi
- Editor: Yusuf Kot (2008-2010 & 2013-2017), Kerem Abadi (2010-2013), Elif Büşra Doğan (2013), Faruk Günindi (2013-2017)
- Categories: Humor magazine
- Frequency: Monthly; Once in three months
- Founded: 2007-2017
- First issue: 2007 May
- Final issue: 2017 March
- Company: Altınoluk AŞ (2007-2008), Küresel İletişim Merkezi AŞ (2008-2013), Yeryüzü Doğal Sağlık Yayıncılık Ltd (2013-2017)
- Country: Turkey
- Language: Turkish
- Website: Cafcaf
- ISSN: 1308-7487
- OCLC: 607636110

Cafcaf Humour Magazine (Turkish: Cafcaf Mizah Dergisi, as known as Cafcaf) is a magazine that has been published in Turkey since 2007. It was published monthly until 2011 when it began to be published once every three months. The publication consultant of the magazine is Asım Gültekin.

In 2007, Cafcaf started to be published as part of Genç Dergi’s addition. In December 2008, Cafcaf became independent and started to be sold as single publication. At various times, Cafcaf's frequency changed as monthly or twice a month. Now, however, it is published once every three months.

Cafcaf Magazine changed its name to "CF Magazine" in March 2017. It featured more culture and art works on its pages than before. Cartoon and humour works were published in "Hacamat" Humour Magazine published by Faruk Günindi and Yusuf Kot (2015-2016), who are also the owners and illustrators of Cafcaf. "Hacamat" can stand for 56 quantity (2015-2016). The writer team of Cafcaf lastly tried one more time to publist a magazine "Yeni Cafcaf"; only 4 quantity (2017-2018). Also in 2012, a Wedding Special Issue prepared by the magazine's writers and illustrators was printed as a wedding invitation for Cafcaf writer Gülsüm Kavuncu and Cafcaf illustrator Yasir Buğra Eryılmaz.

After Cafcaf is closed, most of writers and drawers start doing caricature on social media. Most of them stopped doing it in these days, but some of them are still doing it.

== Some of writers and drawers ==
- Adem Mermerkaya
- Ahmet Altay
- Ahmet Mutlu
- Ahmet Keskin
- Betül Zarifoğlu
- Behlül Balkan
- Bülent Akyürek
- Büşra Tosun Durmuş
- Cihangir Bayburtoğlu
- Derya Işık Özbay
- Ebru Zeynep Yetimakman
- Elif Büşra Doğan
- Emre Bilgiç
- Gülsüm Kavuncu
- Faruk Günindi
- Feridun Demir
- Hakan Öztürk
- Mustafa Yavuz
- Murat Menteş
- Niyazi Çol
- Ömer Faruk Dönmez
- Ramazan Yıldız
- Salih Kılınç
- Serhat Albamya
- Şafak Tavkul
- Turgut Yılmaz
- Volkan Akmeşe
- Yasir Buğra Eryılmaz
- Yavuz Girgin
- Yusuf Kot
