= Ateş Hırsızı =

Turkish anarchist magazine

- Founded: 1992
- Final issue: April 1999
- Company: Birey Yayınları
- Country: Turkey
- Based in: Istanbul
- Language: Turkish
- OCLC: 29677710

Ateş Hırsızı ("Fire thief" in Turkish) was a Turkish anarchist magazine. The magazine was based in Istanbul. It was published from 1992 to April 1999. Extracts from the magazine were published in a 2011 book, Ateş Hırsızı Dergisi Seçkisi.

== Books ==
- Ateş Hırsızı Dergisi Seçkisi (Türkiye'de Anarşist Düşünce Tarihi Serisi - 3), Editör: Can Başkent, Propaganda Yayınları, ISBN 978-0-9868586-9-7 (pdf), 978-0-9877973-0-8 (ePub), 978-0-9877973-1-5 (mobi), 122 sayfa, Ekim 2011.
