= Altüst =

Quarterly Turkish political magazine

- Type: Political magazine
- Owner(s): Arife Köse
- Editor-in-chief: Burak Demir
- Founded: April 2011
- Language: Turkish
- Website: altust.org

Altüst ("Upsidedown" in Turkish) is a quarterly political magazine published in Turkey. The magazine was first published on 1 April 2011. It has a socialist stance.

== Editorial board members and contributors ==
- Şenol Karakaş
- İbrahim Sediyani
- Doğan Akhanlı
- Roni Margulies
