= Azeri Turk (magazine) =

- Editor: Mammad Sadig Aran, Mahammad Amin Rasulzade
- Language: Turkish

Azeri Turk (Azerbaijani: Azəri Türk) is a scientific, literary, social, economic, and political magazine that was published by exiles who came to Istanbul after the Soviet takeover of the Azerbaijan Republic in the 1920s.

The magazine was first published on February 1, 1928, and was published every 15 days. The owner of the magazine was Mammad Sadig Axundzade, the director and chief editor was Mahammad Amin Rasulzade. All issues of the magazine had articles about the problems of Azerbaijan, as the country was going through a difficult period during the time the magazine was published (1928–1931). Azeri Turk was an important publication that helped shape the idea of independence for Azerbaijanis both in Azerbaijan and abroad.

In November 1928, there was a disagreement between Mahammad Amin Rasulzade, Mirza Bala Mammadzade and Mammad Sadig Axundzade, as a result of which Mahammad Amin Rasulzade and Mirza Bala Mammadzade left the magazine and established the Odlu Yurd magazine. Later, Shefi bay Rustembayli also left the magazine and joined Odlu Yurd magazine.

== About ==
Azeri Turk succeeded another magazine named Yeni Kafkasya. The first issue of the magazine was published in Istanbul on February 1, 1928, and only 29 issues were published. The price of the magazine published in "Orhaniye", "Milliyet" and "Amedi" printing houses was initially 10 kuras, but later it increased to 20 kuras. "Azeri Turk" was published regularly every two weeks in the first year, later it was published once a month, and in some months it was not published at all. The last nine issues of the magazine were printed in Latin letters, and the last issue was published in February 1930. Some issues of the magazine are dedicated to special days and topics, for example, "tenth anniversary of the Declaration of Independence of Azerbaijan" (issue 9), "August 30 Victory" "issue 15" and "Letter Revolution" (issue 18) has been done.

=== Form of the magazine ===
In the period from February 1, 1928, to March 1, 1931, the first 20 issues were in Arabic letters, and a total of 32 issues were published in the Azeri Turk magazine, which was gradually switched to Latin letters. After the decision of the Soviet government to definitively switch to Latin letters in Azerbaijan in 1929, the management of the magazine began to use the new letters in the new issues starting from the 10th issue in order to gradually introduce the new letters to the readers. In addition to these, the date, number, price and page numbers of the magazine were given with new numbers. In the last pages of the 11th and 14th issues of the magazine, the international numbers adopted by the Grand National Assembly of Turkey and the tables showing which signs these numbers correspond to in the Arabic alphabet were published, and an effort was made to teach the readers new letters. In the 15th issue, the Latin alphabet adopted by the Grand National Assembly of Turkey and another table showing the corresponding sounds of these letters in the Arabic alphabet were published, so the readers got acquainted with the new alphabet. The magazine tried to use simple Turkish to make it easier for readers from all walks of life. The editor-in-chief of the magazine, headed by Rasulzade, adopted the idea of Ismayil Gaspirali "unity in language, thought, work" and applied the element of this idea "unity in language" in their magazines. According to Rasulzade, as a requirement of the policy of Russification, which began during the Tsarist Russia and reached its peak during the Soviet Russia, the dialect used by each Turkic tribe should be shown as a different language and converted into another language called by the name of the tribe it belongs to, and the ties between these tribes should be cut off. was aimed at. To put an end to this situation, instead of different local dialects, a common dialect should be chosen and there should be a common written language. The most suitable dialect was Turkish (Ottoman) Turkish. Rasulzade defended the idea of simplifying Turkish Turkish by removing many foreign words from Ottoman Turkish and replacing them with purely Turkish words so that every class of people could easily understand the article they were reading. This idea was tried to be implemented in "Azeri Turk". Although attempts were made to simplify the heavy, stilted language of Ottoman Turkish as much as possible, it was not possible to achieve complete simplification. In addition, the entire editorial staff of the magazine consisted of Azerbaijani Turks. Some of them knew Ottoman Turkish well, while others did not. Therefore, Azerbaijani words were often used in the articles and writings, which made the language of the magazine dirty. In short, although the language of the magazine was chosen in Ottoman, they still tried to use simple language, but Rasulzade and Mirza Bala's departure from the magazine due to disagreements between them and Mammad Sadig caused negative changes not only in the content, but also in the form of the magazine. In 1928, when it started its publishing life, the magazine, which was published regularly every two weeks, after taking over the management of Mammad Sadig in December 1928, it published 20 issues in 1928, and only nine issues in 1929. In 1930, this number decreased to two, and in 1931, the last year of publication, only one number was printed. Thus, the magazine that published 20 issues in 1 year under the leadership of Rasulzade, managed to publish only 12 issues in 3 years under the leadership of Mammad Sadig. The magazine under the leadership of Rasulzade and Mirza Bala published 16 pages, and 8 pages were published under the leadership of Akhundzade. From the 21st issue, the font size in the magazine, which was published in Latin letters, was changed and replaced with larger points. This led to the publication of fewer articles and articles due to the reduction in the number of pages.

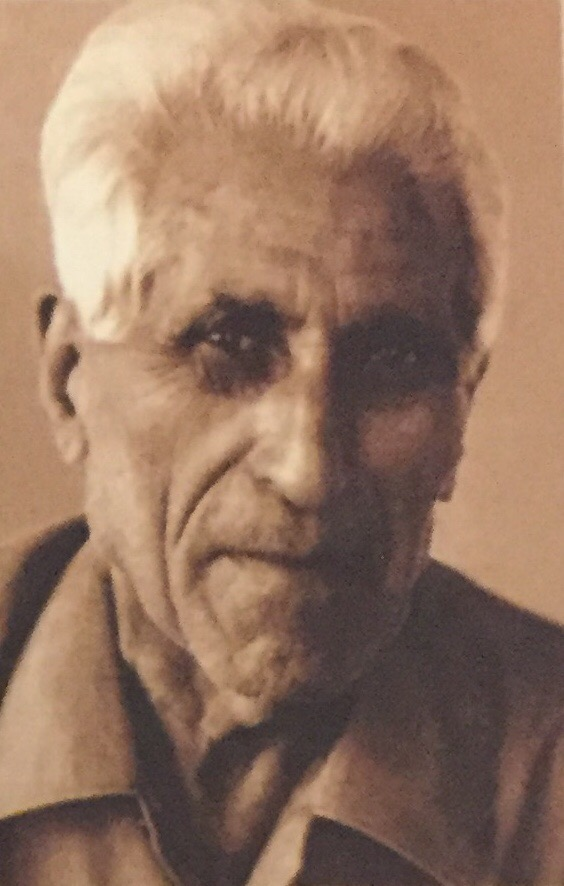
Mammad Sadig Aran

"Azeri Turk Youth Union"

Despite facing many negative elements under the leadership of Mammad Sadig, "Azeri Türk" magazine made a commendable struggle for regaining the independence of Azerbaijan. Thus, with the meetings and conferences mostly held in the "Azeri Turk" administration building, the connection of the Azerbaijani youth abroad with national education and culture was continued through the line of the "Azeri Turk Youth Union" chaired by Mammad Sadig. At the same time, realizing how important these young people and, most importantly, educated Azerbaijani youth are for the union, thanks to the help collected from the participants in good financial condition in these meetings, the needy Azerbaijani young people were provided with education, clothing and food. In addition, from the news published in November 1929, it is understood that since 1924, the union provided financial assistance to 39 poor students and managed the placement of many students in schools. Not only "Azeri Türk" magazine, but also "Yeni Qafqaziya" magazine, 32 historical and public conferences were organized in the administrative buildings and financial assistance was given to 8 new students until November 1929. It is also possible to say that one of the reasons for the above-mentioned changes that took place under Akhundzade's leadership was the time and money he allocated to the "Azeri Turkish Youth Union". So, Mammad Sadig allocated almost all of the money collected at the meetings and conferences to the students, and he also made an effort to build a dormitory for Azerbaijani students in 1931.

== Editors ==
In addition to Mahammad Amin Rasulzade and Mahammad Sadig Akhundzade, the following signatures and names are noteworthy in the editorial board of the magazine: Mirza Bala Mammadzade, "Kamal", A. Uran, "Ayin Kaf", "Senan", "Shafi", "Azeri", "Mustafa". , M. Sisyanli, "H. C. L", Y. Ali, "Mir", Jafar Sadig.

This rich collective of writers spread to Azerbaijan, Turkey, and various European countries. With this, "Azeri Turk" had the opportunity to receive first-hand information from many parts of the world and convey it to its readers, not only in Azerbaijan and Turkey. The magazine had correspondents in various European countries such as France, Germany and Poland, and Middle Eastern countries such as Iran and Afghanistan.

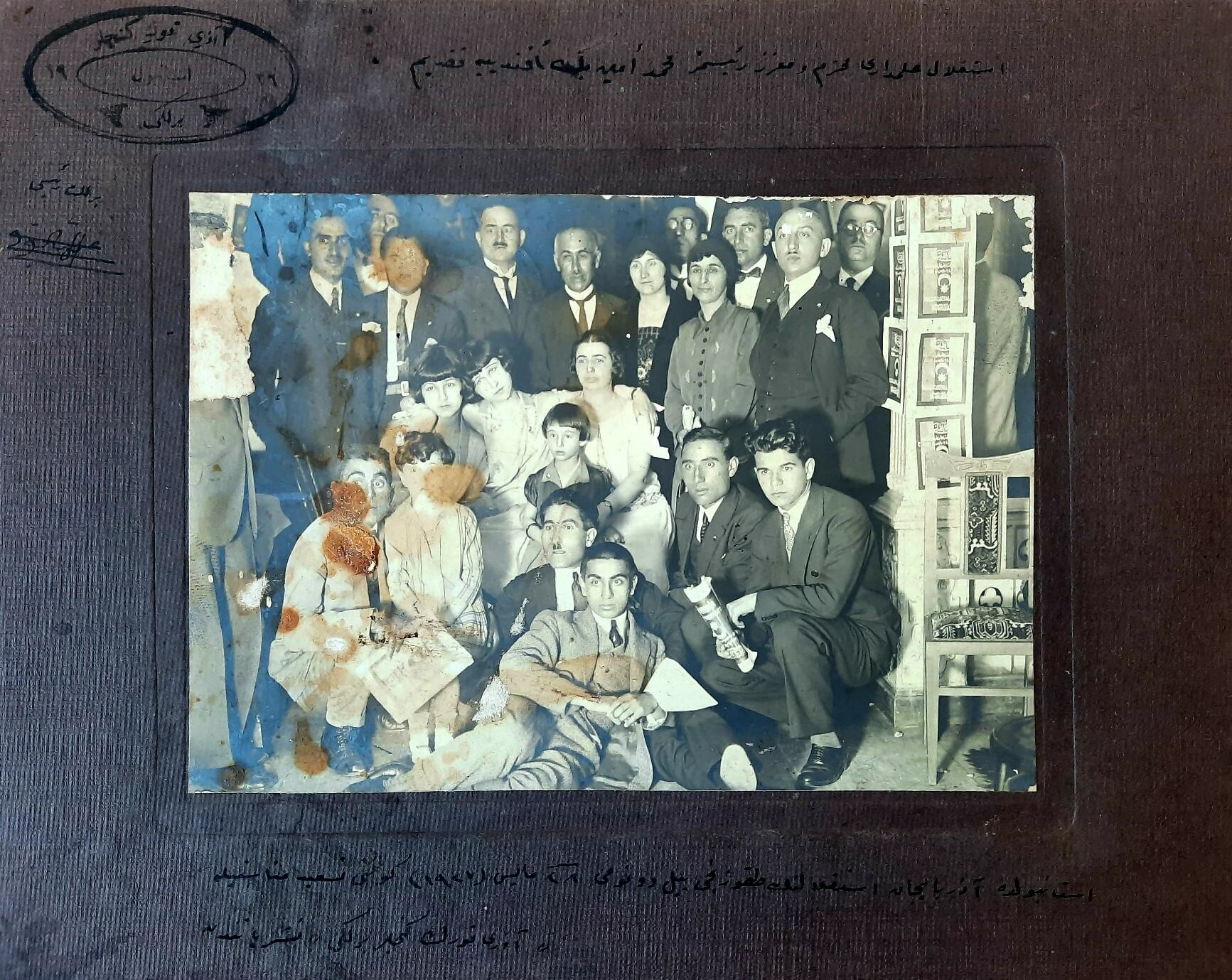
Fotoda yazıçı heyətindən 4 nəfər var: Mahammad Amin Rasulzade, Shafi bay Rustambayli, Mustafa Agha Vakilov, Mammad Sadig Aran (Istanbul, 1927, the event related to the 9th anniversary of the ADR)

M. A. Rasulzade, M. B. Mammadzade, Mahammad Sadig, Shafi bay Rustambayli, Kamal Ganizade bay with the pseudonym "Kamal", H. Jamal bay with the signature "H. C. L" lived in Istanbul and wrote their articles here, but the articles written there related to Rasulzade's departure for various reasons in the magazine also took place. Rasulzade sent five articles published between March 22, 1928, and June 30, 1928, to the management of the magazine from Paris. During his stay in Paris, he had the opportunity to closely follow the French press, including the elections in Germany. The staff of the magazine in France consisted of Rasulzade, writing under the pseudonym "Azeri" and Mir Gasim Mehdiyev, writing under the pseudonym "Mir". The news sent to the magazine from Germany is also signed by A. Uran. Along with the news of A. Uran, the German correspondent of the magazine and living in Berlin, articles were also published in the magazine. In addition, Mustafa Bay Vakilov, who signed "Mustafa" or "M" in his writings, contributed to "Azeri Türk" with news and political writings he sent from Warsaw. The owner of the "Dash Demir" signature, which we often see in the magazine, was none other than Mirza Bala Mammadzade. By writing "Baku" under the articles he wrote with this signature, he created the impression that the articles were sent from Baku, thereby confusing the Soviet spies and creating an opportunity for him to move more easily in Istanbul.

"Ayin Kaf" or "A. K." the person who wrote with his own signature was the magazine's Middle East correspondent, and the latest news about Afghanistan and Iran was included in the magazine through this reporter. Jafar Sadig, an Iranian correspondent for Azeri Turk, lived in Tabriz and was responsible for bringing the latest news there to the magazine. Living in Istanbul, Sanan was more interested in Iranian literature and published articles in the magazine introducing Iranian Turkish poets, more precisely South Azerbaijani literature, South Azerbaijani poets and their poems. He also contributed to Azeri Turkish with his poems. Adhering to the phrase "we will gladly publish articles suitable for our issue" on the cover of the magazine, the articles and poems sent to the management of the magazine, many of which were sent by university students about the independence of Azerbaijan, were also included in the magazine's issues.

== Aim of the magazine ==
The purpose of the magazine was announced by Mahammad Amin Rasulzade in the first issue under the title "The Path We Take":

The path we are going to take is not "reh-i-na-refta" (untraveled before) as the poets of the previous period boasted. Even this path is very difficult and difficult, but it is also a glorious path that has been traveled by others. This is the path of truth and the path of the nation. , Europe went in the 18th and even in the 19th century, and the modern East is currently going through that road. It is a road that even the condemned nations living within the former Russian Empire have gone through. It is a road that has nationalism as its successor and independence as its goal. As a result of the Azeri-Turkish war, the struggle for independence It is a magazine about the fate of a Turkish province that started, reached the goal of republic with great love and enthusiasm, but was cut off again with national independence, the Azeri Turkish people, better known as the "Republic of Azerbaijan". Azeri Turk will analyze the basics of Azerbaijani Turkishness. That is, Turkish culture. While illuminating with a European style, it will never deviate from the path of sincere contact and relationship with the people. work will use the perfect technology of the century to satisfy the sincere feelings and needs of the people. On the one hand, he will try to bring people's taste to the level where they will understand science and art, and on the other hand, he will promote the idea of benefiting from science and art in a way that people will like. Azeri Turk is a nationalist. As in the field of Hars, he wants the people to rule in political life as well. It promotes the principle of Hakimiyyat-i Milliye. It rejects all regimes that rely on the existence or dominance of a single class. Azeri Turk is not only a democrat, but also a radical. He understands this radicalism in the sense of fighting against the stagnation of feudalism.

Looking at the copies of Azeri Turk, which revealed its goals in this way, it can be seen that most of the political, social and literary articles related to Azerbaijan are placed on the first pages.

After the publication of the 20th issue in November 1928, as a result of disagreements between Mahammad Amin Rasulzade, Mirza Bala Mammadzade and Mammad Sadig Akhundzade, Rasulzade and M. B. Mammadzade left the magazine and created Odlu Yurd magazine. From December 1928, the magazine published under the leadership of M. S. Akhundzade published articles supporting Azerbaijan's struggle for independence, but in these articles, he put forward the idea that Azerbaijan's independence would be possible only with the establishment of the Caucasus Union. In the 23rd issue published on the occasion of the 2nd anniversary of the magazine, Akhundzade wrote: "Azeri Turk is a broadcast organ of nationalists who take on the task of defending the independence struggle of Azerbaijan. Our magazine wishes for the liberation of the captive Turkish countries and sees the way to this in a united struggle against the Russian occupation." Akhundzade clearly expressed his thoughts with these words. For this purpose, Mammad Sadig Akhundzade's articles showing the importance of the Caucasian Union were printed in almost all issues of the magazine.

On February 5, 1929, Shafi Bay Rustambayli also left the magazine and joined the writing staff of Odlu Yurd magazine.

== Selections from the magazine ==
Political issues Political and economic developments in Turkey, Iran, and Europe, especially in Soviet Russia, were followed in the magazine. In addition to Soviet Russia's Russification policy in Azerbaijan, the transfer of the country's national wealth to Russia was often mentioned. In addition, the magazine also contained articles defending Azerbaijan as a country capable of self-governance and the possibility of gaining independence and getting rid of the exploitation of Soviet Russia.

The first issue of the magazine included information on the "Future of Democracy" conference given by M.A. Rasulzade at the "Azeri Turkish Youth Union". In this conference, Rasulzade positively evaluated the struggle they have been fighting against the enemy for 7–8 years. He said:

Democracy is the name of the system inherent in the management of any human republic. It is also known that this name applies especially to political management. Our topic is not "what is democracy" but the future of democracy. The concept of democracy was passed on to us easterners from the west. In simpler terms, we imported it from the modern civilized world. But the east began to practice it at a time when it was criticized by the "great world democrats" such as Europe and America, the original homeland of this system. Communists from the left and fascists from the right criticized democracy, one calling it a "lie" and the other a "weakness." Some of the radical democrats also admitted that he was suffering from separation and diseases.

An article published in the fourth issue under the title "Jewish Republic" focuses on the activities of the "Jewish Settlement Committee" created by the Soviet government.

This committee has been working for 4-5 years on the project of establishing a Jewish Republic in the provinces of Tavria, Hersun, Nikulayev and Odessa by gathering Jews in the south of Ukraine and the north of Crimea. With this initiative supported by the Soviet government and wealthy American Jews, at the end of 1927 the "Palestine" in England was established. It is planned to establish a Jewish State of 7-8 million people that could compete with the Jewish State. However, like other projects of the Soviet government, this is doomed to failure.

In the twelfth issue of the weekly magazine Politika, one of the official publications of Italy, reference is made to an article on the Caucasus issue, which touched on the international importance of the issue:

Eight million people living in the Caucasus, one of the most important strategic points in the world, are fighting for their independence, and they are facing oppression and a terrorist regime due to the negligent observation of Europe. One of these nations is Azerbaijan, which, like its neighbor Georgia, is anti-Soviet and an enemy of Russia, and demands its independence from Russia.

As here, Azeri Turk emphasizes the independence of Azerbaijan and its struggle on this path at every opportunity. In the same issue, Mirza Bala talks about the commemorative events for the 50th anniversary of the death of Mirza Fatali Akhundov, one of the great writers of Azerbaijan, and says that the programs organized by the Soviet government are not at all sincere and the goal is to comfort the Azeri people. "Fatali Akhundov is the national pride of Azerbaijan, therefore it is impossible to believe in the programs of the Soviets who leave no stone unturned in Azerbaijan".

On the other hand, "Azeri Turk" makes various observations that are of great importance:

We see that national culture does not consist only of language and some local-geographic conditions. National culture consists of a harmonious combination of all social relations and institutions, including language. The main factor that distinguishes this culture from others is not only language, but also the society that forms national culture. It is a national-spiritual (psychological) feature. This is the feature that shows itself in language, sounds, music and painting, dance, religion and law, morality and turmoil, and it is also the feature that gives another "I" to the national culture. Although communists look for this difference only in language and geographical distances, we observe it in all the lives that make up the national culture. That otherness consists of a common national spirit. The national spirit whose unity and solidarity can be called both the result and the cause of nationality.

The interview of the leader of the Turkish nation, Mustafa Kemal, about the French Revolution and the Turkish Revolution was published in "Azeri Turk" magazine under the title "Gazi Pasha's statement". M. Kamal said here, "The French Revolution conquered the idea of freedom for the whole world. And this idea still has its origins and roots. But since then, mankind has progressed. Although Turkish democracy determined the path opened by the French Revolution, it developed it with its own unique and pure charm. Because, every nation makes its revolution according to the rules and needs of the social environment, the internal situation and the time of the revolution. Aren't we witnessing the repetition of the same event all the time and everywhere?" With these words, "Azeri Turk" drew attention to both the French Revolution and the Turkish Revolution and highly appreciated it.

"Azeri Turk" also provides information about the Armenian issue, which is still on the agenda today, and states that the Armenian press and community leaders are trying to incite the European public against Muslims by talking about Turkey's attitude towards Armenians even before the First World War.

Since the beginning of the war, it is known to everyone what active steps Armenian chauvinists and the "Dashnaksutyun" group have taken against Muslims, especially Turkey and Caucasian Turks. Armenians living in Europe and Russia began to say with one voice, "Armenia should belong to Armenians." The mentioned regiments looted and looted the Turkish villages they encountered under the name of Russian soldiers. When the Turkish army withdrew from the Caucasian front, the Caucasian Armenians, united with the Armenians living in Turkey, began to wipe out the Turkish and Muslim villages. The officers of Dashnaksut, standing at the railway stations, were dismissed under the name "Muslims carry weapons". they were busy killing passing Turks. After the Russian revolution in 1917, Armenians completely threw away the mask they were wearing.

He informed about the events that happened at that time and how the so-called Armenian Genocide news appeared.

Social issues

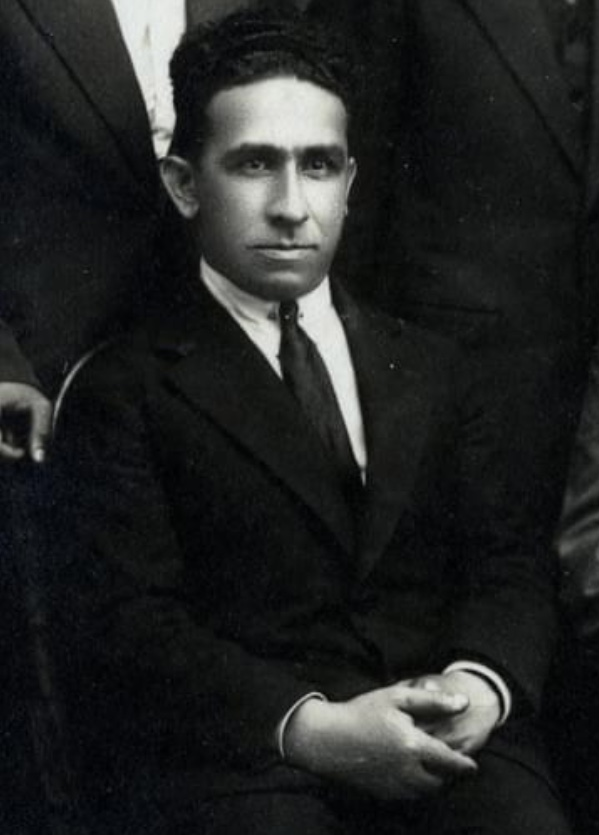
Mirza Bala Mammadzade who writes articles under the signature "Dashdemir"

In addition to a series of articles on the rich historical and cultural past of Azerbaijan, the magazine also includes articles on education, national culture and art. The magazine has made great efforts to educate the youth of Azerbaijan, who were exposed to the Russification policy implemented by the Soviet government or living abroad, in the spirit of patriotism depending on their national culture and traditions. In this context, information about meetings and conferences of the "Azeri Turkish Youth Union" was published.

In the article entitled "On the occasion of the issue of hijab", the details of the prohibition of veils and hijab, which began to be applied in Azerbaijan during this period and caused many discussions, are discussed.

Although Mustafa Guliyev and his friends want to abolish the headscarf and replace it with a "European hat", some people are in favor of gradual reforms of the headscarf. The interesting point is that the Russian women who run the women's branch of the communist faction working in Azerbaijan, instead of bringing European-style clothes to Azerbaijan, like Azeris, they started to walk with "Ganja Orpai". As a result, what should be done in the face of these different opinions and experiences is to solve this issue as a revolution.

The article titled "Moral depression" signed by Dashdemir talks about the problems of the society, starting from the veil issue mentioned earlier. The Moscow press was not indifferent to the discussions between Mustafa Guliyev, a member of the Communist Party, and his friends and the women's committee. In the article published on this topic, which even caused family disasters, it was said that "it is recommended to first eliminate spiritual slavery, which is the basis of material slavery, and for this reason, we recommend starting with men first, not with women."

Communist men are the majority of men who insult women, deprive them of their freedom, do not allow them to attend public gatherings, theaters, and kill women because of their political and social activities. As long as men remain with old thinking and thinking, depression, female-male family crisis, within the family disasters began to appear.

In addition to political events, the magazine also discusses the social problems of Azerbaijan and offers ways to solve them. Addressing the problem of unemployment as a social problem, "Azeri Türk" reported in its issue dated August 15, 1928: "At the beginning of 1927, the number of unemployed in Baku was 22,123, but it increased by 52% within a year and reached 33,747 in July 1928. "The number of unemployed intellectuals increased by 60% this year. This rate increases with the invasion of schools and institutions by Russians. Currently, there are 1,400 schools and 2,000 teachers in Azerbaijan, and the number of teachers should be at least 4,000."

In addition to such sad events, "Azeri Türk" magazine also featured good news such as the discovery of a drug that cured tuberculosis and treated more than 100 patients by an Azerbaijani doctor named Shakhtantinsky.

Foreign news

"Azeri Türk" also includes news about world politics. As we mentioned earlier, the magazine had correspondents who delivered news from European and Middle Eastern countries. Therefore, it was necessary to closely monitor the course of events happening abroad. Some of these news items include:

"The "Azerbaijan Representation" created in Paris under the chairmanship of Ali Mardan bey Topchubashov has never addressed Azerbaijani nationalists and immigrants, and even once insulted them with the expression "street herd". Against this situation, the "Azerbaijan" magazine published in Paris protested to Ali Merdan, stated that he has no right to represent Azerbaijan."

The "Friendship and Security Pact" signed in Tehran between Turkey and Iran is mentioned in Turkish and Iranian newspapers in a friendly and sincere way.

"Azeri Türk" also mentions the applause that was heard in Darulfun on the day of the signing of the Lausanne Peace Treaty. This agreement is "a fair reward for the glorious struggle of the new Turkey, covered with the blessed blood shed for independence".

The magazine, which includes news from outside Azerbaijan and Turkey, often talks about Afghanistan and Crimea. Noting that positive events have taken place in Afghanistan, he informed his readers that after the visits of King Amanullah Khan to Europe, Turkey, Egypt and Iran, the reconstruction movement was started and constitutional monarchy was declared. Crimea, like in Turkestan, Kazan, Azerbaijan, North Caucasus, Georgia, makes sacrifices on the path of rebellion.

On the other hand, since the Jewish settlement in Crimea is brought up, the young people of Crimea try to protect their national rights by fighting in this way.

Touching on the articles written about him in the press, "Azeri Turk" mentions the articles in which he was praised in Iranian, Anatolian newspapers and Istanbul magazines, and referring to "Ijtihad" magazine, he wrote: "Azeri Turk" is a living work published by young nationalist Azerbaijanis. "Azeri Turk" is the Turk's own brother. Read this magazine. It is a magazine worth reading." Expressing their happiness in front of these beautiful words and praises, the management of the magazine stated in issues 28-29 that "Azeri Turk" continues to live in the summer under difficult conditions, and did not spare them their help. he thanked everyone. In fact, this was their last issue, and with issue 29, the magazine ended its publishing life.

Remarkable days

Another function of "Azeri Turk" was to revive the national feelings of Azerbaijani Turks by covering important days. For example, in the article titled "March Tragedy" in the fifth issue, attention is drawn to the massacre committed by Armenian regiments in Shamakhi ten years ago, and the inhumane treatment of Azerbaijanis is reminded. Even though the people of Shamakhi, who were oppressed, migrated to Baku, they face greater disasters here.

In order not to live these days again, we must always remember March 31st, the blood expressed on that day, all the details of the tragedy and the murderers, martyrs and victims of March 31st.

It is written about this in the magazine, which also includes Izmir's liberation from occupation:

Every Turk should work within his means to make Izmir a glorious official and happy, at the cost of Turk's countless sacrifices and rivers of blood.

The "Azerbaijan Declaration of Independence" dated May 28, 1918 was published under the name "Azerbaijan Misak-i Milli" on the cover of the magazine dated May 28, 1928. Later, under the title "Ten years of perseverance and jihad", it was stated that the declaration is a "line" that divides the life of the Azerbaijani people into two separate pages, and the Turkish people of Azerbaijan, which were called "nationality" before 1918, became "nation" after 1918.

The 15th issue of the magazine is dedicated to the 6th year of the Victory Day on August 30. The issue of September 15, 1928 is dedicated to the liberation days of Azerbaijan, the 10th anniversary of the liberation of Baku from enemy occupation. In the article published with the signature of Mirza Bala, it is written:

Just as May 28, which signifies the organization of our society and the foundation of our national ideology, heralded the end of the era of "nationality" and the beginning of the life of "nation", September 15 marked the existence and consciousness of the nation, the wise Azerbaijani society is ready to die in order to live, to perish in order to save. It is a historical time that showed that nation is able to throw his existence in the mouth of hell's cannons for the sake of freedom and independence.

Mirza Bala Mammadzade, talking about the transition of the Republic of Turkey to new letters, wrote that in 1918–1920, some studies were conducted and projects were prepared. Even the National government created a commission and started the project of defining new letters specific to the Azerbaijani language. However, the Bolshevik invasion did not allow this project to take place. Mirza Balal continued: "Today's most urgent issue is to ensure the unity of Turkish culture by comparing letters between Turkish and Azerbaijani alphabets."

== List of publications featured in the magazine ==
Collections and books promoted in the magazine
Edition	Content
Maişat-i Milli newspaper	A newspaper published in Rasht, under the leadership of Khalil Navi, which published articles encouraging friendship between Turkey, Iran and Eastern Islamic countries.
Prometheus Collection	A monthly magazine published in French by Caucasian, Ukrainian and Turkestan nationalists in Paris. It provides important information about the economic and political situation of Azerbaijan.
Review of the month	It is a monthly magazine published by the General Directorate of Press.
Philosophy and society collection	It is a magazine with rich content.
Life Collection	It is a weekly science and shariat magazine published in Ankara.
New Turkestan magazine	In the 8th issue of the magazine, which is similar to "Azeri Turk", photographs depicting the journey of the Afghan king to Europe, articles and pictures depicting the struggles of Turkestan were published.
Turkish Weather Service	A literary and scientific magazine published every 15 days by the Turkish Theater Society in Ankara.
Hilal-i Ahmar collection	It is a scientific, medical and anti-alcohol magazine published by the Hilal-i Ahmar society in Istanbul.
Kutahya magazine	Scientific and literary magazine published every 15 days
Ijtihad magazine	Published by Abdullah Cevdat twice in a month.
Armenians and Iran	It is a treatise written by Mirza Bala Mammadzade criticizing Dashnaktsutyun Armenian Party's policy in Iran. It is considered an important work for those who follow Eastern politics.
Nations separated from Russia	It is a work written by Abdullah Battal, a former council member of the Kazan Turks, which provides detailed information about the nations that left Russia. It was published in Ankara by the Central Committee of Turkish Hearths.
Method of teaching geography	The work written by Dr. Khalil Fikret.
Nationality and Bolshevism	A collection of articles compiled under the guidance of M.A. Rasulzade.

== Sources ==
- İbrahimli, Xaladdin (2012). History of emigration of Azerbaijan (PDF). Baku: Elm və tehsil. p. 372.
- Ulusoy, Belkis (1999). National problems of Azerbaijan according to Azeri Turk magazine(1928-1931). Istanbul: Turkish Research Institute.
- Ulusoy, Belkis (2001). Azeri Turkish Magazine, One of the Most Important Publications of Azerbaijan's Political Immigrants. Journal of the Faculty of Communication. pp. 223–233.
- Shimshir, Sabahattin (1920–1991). Political and cultural activities of Azerbaijanis in Turkey. Ankara: Azerbaijan Cultural Association. p. 256.
- Gumushsoy, Amina (2007). Mahammad Amin Rasulzade and Nationalist Magazine. Ankara: Azerbaijan Cultural Association. pp. 45–55.
- Erenoghlu, D. (2008). Russia's Alphabet Politics in Azerbaijan According to the Azeri Turk Magazine. Istanbul: International Review of Turkology. pp. 29–35.
