= Çarşaf (magazine) =

Turkish humor magazine (1975–1992)

- Categories: Satirical magazine; Humor magazine
- Founded: 1978
- First issue: 17 December 1975
- Final issue: 2 April 1992
- Company: Hürriyet Publications
- Country: Turkey
- Based in: Istanbul
- Language: Turkish

Çarşaf was a Turkish language humor magazine which was in circulation in the period 1975–1992. The magazine was based in Istanbul, Turkey.

== History and profile ==
Çarşaf was first published on 17 December 1975. It was part of Hürriyet Publications which also owned the daily Hürriyet. Çarşaf was managed by two cartoonists, Nehar Tüblek ve Semih Balcıoğlu.

The magazine followed the tradition of other humor magazines such as Akbaba and Gırgır. However, unlike Gırgır Çarşaf was published in full color. Çarşaf managed to reach higher levels of circulation, but folded in 1992. The last four issues of the magazine were published as a supplement of daily newspaper Hürriyet, and the final issue was dated 2 April 1992.
