= Büyük Mecmua =

Political magazine in the Ottoman Empire (1919–1920)

- Editor-in-chief: Zekeriya Sertel; Sabiha Sertel
- Categories: News magazine; Political magazine
- Frequency: Weekly; Biweekly
- Publisher: Diken Publishing Company
- Founder: Zekeriya Sertel; Sabiha Sertel
- Founded: 1919
- First issue: 6 March 1919
- Final issue: 1920
- Country: Ottoman Empire
- Based in: Cağaloğlu, Istanbul
- Language: Ottoman Turkish

Büyük Mecmua (Ottoman Turkish: بیوك مجموعه, 'Great periodical') was a magazine that was briefly published in the Ottoman Empire in 1919 and 1920 during the Independence War. It was one of the many publications launched and edited by the Turkish journalist couple Sabiha and Zekeriya Sertel.

== History and profile ==
At the publication of its first issue, on 6 March 1919, Büyük Mecmua was headquartered in Cağaloğlu, İstanbul. Sabiha and Zekeriya Sertel were among the founders of the magazine, which aimed to raise awareness among people about the significance of unity and support for the Independence War. The magazine adopted a secularist and modernist approach.

The license holder for the first seven issues were Zekeriya Sertel. He was imprisoned for his articles published in Büyük Mecmua that criticised the authorities for their inability to stop invasion of the Ottoman Empire by the West. Following Zekeriya Sertel's imprisonment the license holder became his wife, Sabiha Sertel. The publisher was Diken Publishing Company. The magazine's first five issues were published weekly on Thursdays, but it then became a biweekly publication.

The magazine covered many topics from political articles and women-related issues to arts, literary work and poems. It also featured caricatures and presented some polls concerning the political situation of the country such as the implementation of Wilsonian principles and the future of the Turkish National Movement. The contributors of Büyük Mecmua in addition to Sabiha and Zekeriya Sertel included many significant authors: Halide Edib Adıvar, Falih Rıfkı Atay, Faruk Nafiz Çamlıbel, Mehmed Fuad Köprülü, Ahmet Rasim and Ömer Seyfettin. Sabiha Sertel's early writings on feminism were published in Büyük Mecmua.

After publishing a total of 17 issues, Büyük Mecmua folded in 1920.
