= Zekeriya Sertel =

Turkish newspaper founder and journalist (1890–1980)

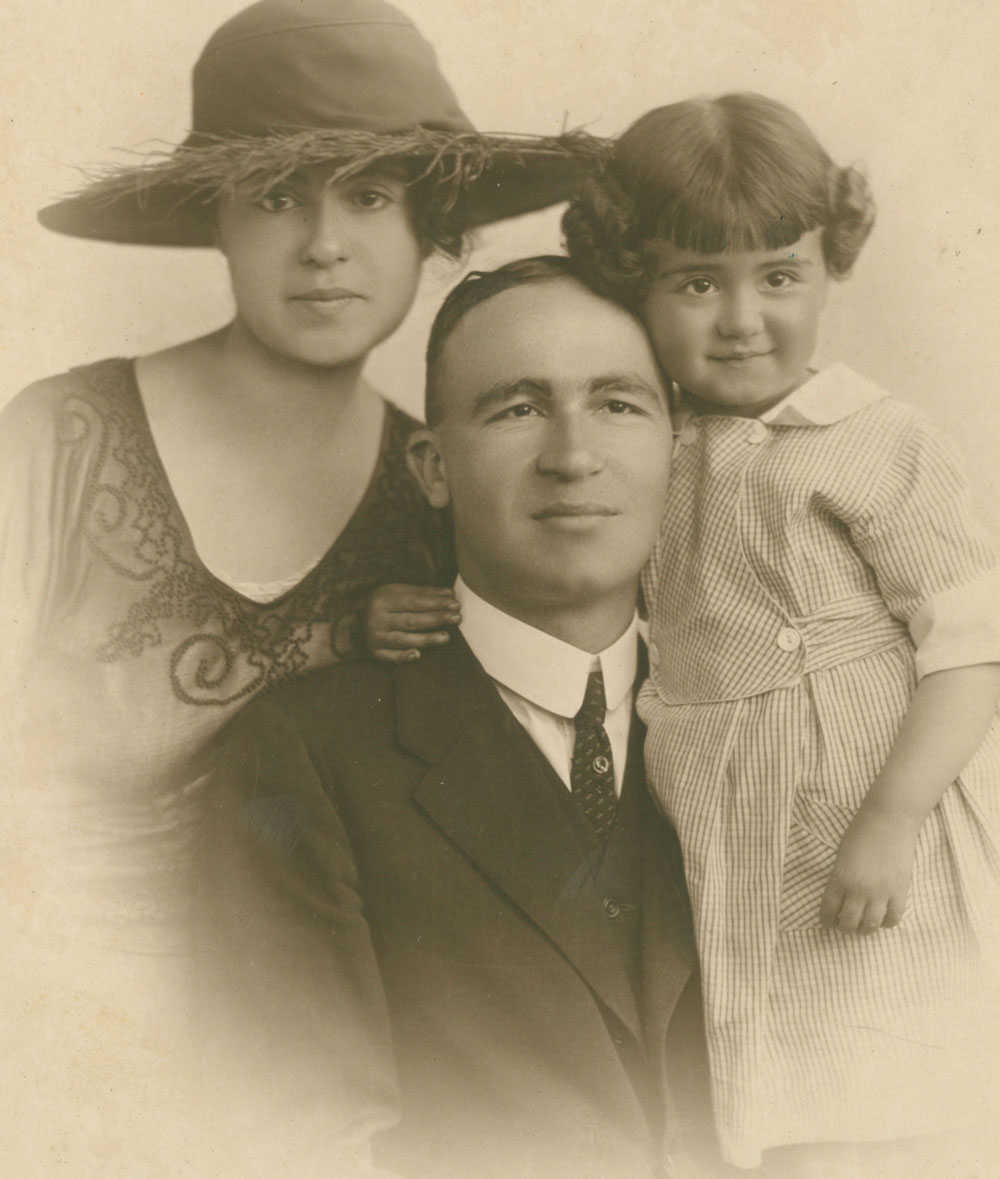
- Sertel with Sabiha Sertel and their daughter, New York City, 1919
- Born: 1890; Ustrumca, Ottoman Empire
- Died: 12 March 1980 (aged 89–90); Paris, France
- Education: Istanbul University
- Occupation: Journalist
- Years active: 1919–1980
- Known for: Founder of Resimli Ay and other periodicals; Turkey's first director of press department; First editor-in-chief of Cumhuriyet newspaper
- Notable work: Mavi Gözlü Dev
- Spouse: Sabiha Sertel

Zekeriya Sertel, also known as Mehmet Zekeriya Sertel, (1890–1980) was a Turkish journalist. He was the first director of state press department and founder and editor of various periodicals. From 1950 to 1980, Sertel lived in exile.

== Early life and education ==
Zekeriya Sertel was born in Ustrumca, Macedonia, Ottoman Empire, in 1890. He graduated from the law faculty of Istanbul University. Then he studied sociology at Sorbonne University and journalism at Columbia University.

== Career and activities ==
Zekeriya began his journalistic career in 1911 when he established a philosophy magazine entitled Yeni Felsefe Mecmuası (Turkish: New Philosophy Journal) in Salonica. Then he worked for the Istanbul-based newspaper Tasvîr-i Efkâr edited by Yunus Nadi and owned by Velid Ebuzziya. Zekeriya established a satirical magazine, Diken, together with Sedat Simavi in 1918. Next year Zekeriya Sertel and his colleagues founded a weekly magazine entitled Büyük Mecmua (Turkish: The Big Review). He and his wife, Sabiha, lived in New York City until 1923 where Zekeriya studied journalism at Columbia University and Sabiha attended the New York School of Social Work. They were granted the Charles Crane scholarship with the help of fellow journalist and writer Halide Edib Adıvar.

Following their return to Turkey Zekeriya was appointed by Mustafa Kemal Atatürk as director of press department of the newly founded Republic of Turkey in Ankara which he held until 1924 after which his wife and he restarted their journalistic career in Istanbul. He was the cofounder and first editor-in-chief of Cumhuriyet newspaper. With his wife he founded and edited several magazines including Resimli Ay, Resimli Perşembe, Resimli Hafta and Sevimli Ay. He also cofounded with other three journalists a newspaper named Son Posta in 1930. When the Liberal Republican Party was formed by Fethi Okyar in 1930 Zekeriya Sertel and other leftist critics of Mustafa Kemal supported the party. Sabiha and Zekeriya Sertel were among the owners of another newspaper, Tan which was published from 1935 to 1945.

=== Arrests and exile ===
In 1919 Zekeriya Sertel was first arrested and detained by the Ottoman authorities due to his articles in Büyük Mecmua which criticised the occupation of Istanbul by the British and other western forces. He was also tried in the Independence Courts which resulted in his three-year imprisonment immediately after the start of weekly magazine Resimli Perşembe in 1925. Then he was arrested several times due to his writings published in Resimli Ay and Tan. His trial was in March 1946 due to his writings in Tan. Not only Zekeriya but also his wife and Halil Lütfü Dördüncü were convicted of libeling the Republic of Turkey and members of the Grand National Assembly. However, in Fall 1946 they all won an appeal. He and his wife left Turkey in 1950 because of political pressures and lived in different countries, namely the Soviet Union, Hungary and France.

== Personal life and death ==
Zekeriya married Sabiha in İstanbul in 1915. Zekeriya's family initially opposed the marriage due to the fact that Sabiha was from a dönme family. Sabiha's family did not support their marriage, either. However, Doctor Nazım of the Committee of Union and Progress congratulated Zekeriya for his decision to marry a dönme girl, and their wedding ceremony was organized and funded by the committee. It was the first public marriage of a Muslim Turk man with a dönme girl.

Following their exile, Zekeriya and Sabiha lived in Baku until 1968 when Sabiha died. Zekeriya had a daughter with who he left Baku for France following the death of his wife. He died in Salpetriere Hospital, Paris, on 12 March 1980.

=== Books ===
Sertel was the author of several books, including Mavi Gözlü Dev which is a biography of his friend and poet Nazım Hikmet Ran. Another one is his mémoire entitled Hatırladıklarım (Turkish: Those that I remember) published in 1968.
