= Yeni Kafkasya =

Turkish political and literary magazine (1923–1927)

- Editor-in-chief: Mahammad Amin Rasulzade
- Categories: Political magazine; Literary magazine
- Frequency: Biweekly
- Founder: Mahammad Emin Resulzade
- Founded: 1923
- First issue: 26 September 1923
- Final issue: 1927
- Country: Turkey
- Based in: Istanbul
- Language: Turkish

Yeni Kafkasya (Turkish: New Caucasus) The journal first published by Azerbaijani emigrants living in the Republic of Turkey.

Starting its publication on September 26, 1923, in Istanbul under the organization of M. A. Resulzade, the “Yeni Kafkasya” journal was the first example of Azerbaijani emigrant press. Although the journal was published under Rasulzada's leadership, Seyid Tahir was the editor-in-chief due to certain political reasons. The annual subscription price of the journal was 120 kuruş, for six months 60 kuruş, and one copy abroad was 5 kuruş.

== About ==
The journal, which began its publication life on September 26, 1923, in Istanbul and served as the publication organ of the "National Azerbaijani Movement," managed to continue its activity for nearly four years. However, it was not easy to publish an anti-communist journal at a time when the Bolsheviks were active. Despite various opinions during this period, the journal, which published 95 issues, was considered harmful by the "Executive Representatives" and ceased its activity at the end of 1927. During its four years of publication, the journal took a break only once. From a notice published in the 7th issue in its third year of publication, it is understood that the journal paused on December 15, 1925, and resumed its activity on February 6, 1926. Although there is no exact information about its circulation, according to Mirze Bala Memmedzadeh, the journal had a large readership in Azerbaijan as well.

Although the 1st and 15th days of the month were set as the primary publication dates, there were some changes to these dates. For example, special issues prepared for Azerbaijan's Independence Day on May 28 and the occupation day on April 27 were published on the anniversaries of these dates. In 1927, issues 5–6, 8–9, and 11–12 were published as combined issues. The "Yeni Kafkasya" journal, which often had delicate cardboard covers in green and pink, sometimes in yellow and blue, featured a different cover for special editions, with the Azerbaijani flag on a white background. The journal's first page always included a header section that remained consistent until the last issue. The phrase "Yeni Kafkasya is published every two weeks as a literary, social, and political collection" was written at the beginning of this section. Each page was divided into two columns. Issues 16 and 17 of the journal's fourth year were printed at the Nəcm-i İstiklal printing house, while all other issues were printed at the Amedi printing house.

On the inside cover of each issue, the date was written in both the Hijri and Rumi calendars, and after 1925, in both the Hijri and Gregorian calendars. Additionally, the issue number and year of publication were indicated in the header section. The subscription terms and prices were also written in the same place within the header section in every issue. The journal's issues were renumbered each year. The founding date of "Yeni Kafkasya" was mistakenly given as 9 Safar 1341 in the Hijri calendar. The correct Hijri equivalent of September 26, 1923 (Rumi 1339), should be 14 Safar 1342. The journal, including the cover, had 18 pages and measured 20.5 x 28 cm.

== The purpose of the journal ==
M. A. Rasulzada summarized the main program directions of the press organs as follows:

1. The promotion and struggle for the restoration of the ideas of national statehood.

2. Criticism of Bolshevism and the exposure of the Soviet government's colonial-style policies.

3. Analysis of the daily social and political activities of the country under Russian Bolshevik occupation, and the proposal of slogans for the struggle, adapted to the changing situation.

4. The development and dissemination of a radical political worldview in the spirit of national-revolutionary politics.

5. Criticism of Soviet press and polemics with it.

In the first issue of the journal, M. A. Rasulzada’s article “Prometheus Who Lit the Fire” (In Place of a Program Article) was published. In this article, through the figure of Prometheus, the resistance of Azerbaijani Turks against Soviet Russia is symbolized.

As we reflect on our topic, the Caucasus, this beautiful land, the historical isthmus between the Caspian Sea and the Black Sea, this rich country that the ancient Greeks praised as the “land of golden wealth,” came to mind. The wild bird that tore at Prometheus was an eagle. Wasn’t the emblem of Russian imperialism, which has been tearing the chest of the Caucasus for a century, also an eagle?! Prometheus was being torn apart once again. The Caucasus would occasionally rise, struggle for life, and then once again become prey to the Russian eagle. The glorious struggle and defeat of the great Shamil, which lasted a quarter of a century, the unforgettable defense and martyrdom of the glorious Javad Khan, the formation of the Caucasian republics at the first opportunity, and the current situation, the uprisings, sacrifices, and bloodshed in Azerbaijan, Georgia, and Dagestan in the struggle for independence and freedom, are nothing but different turns in the struggle between Prometheus and the eagle. The day when the slogan “The Caucasus belongs to the Caucasians!” comes true will be the day the new Caucasus is born. Today's Caucasus does not belong to "eagle" Russia, but to "sickle" Russia. Not to the Caucasians.

This article in the first issue served as a programmatic statement. Later, in the first issue of the journal’s third year of publication, under the title "The General Program of the Publication," the program of "Yeni Kafkasya" was outlined as consisting of the following points:

We have entered the third year of our struggle, and the program that our journal has followed for the past two years and will continue to follow in the coming years is as follows:

- "Yeni Kafkasya" is nationalist, radical, and democratic.
- "Yeni Kafkasya" is Turkist. It aims to highlight the cultural aspects, cultural connections, spiritual unity, and independence of Turks.
- "Yeni Kafkasya" represents the common ideology of Azerbaijani independence fighters who are committed to defending the Azerbaijani front of the Turkish cause.
- "Yeni Kafkasya" supports the unification of the nations of the Caucasus in the form of a confederation to secure their liberation from Russian domination and to successfully resist any potential Russian invasion.
- "Yeni Kafkasya" not only advocates for Azerbaijani nationalism, Turkism, and Caucasian unity, but also embraces the national independence movements in the East, adopting any of their ideas, and sincerely supports radical modernization to free the East from enslavement.
- "Yeni Kafkasya" particularly fights against Russian imperialism, viewing both Tsarism and Bolshevism as equally harmful to the Turkic world and as enemies of the Caucasus.

"Yeni Qafqaziya" was the official propaganda tool that continued Azerbaijan's independence struggle in exile. Its main purpose was the cause of nationalism and independence, the independence of Azerbaijan. The "Yeni Kafkasya" journal saw the foundation of Azerbaijan's independence in the "struggle of the Azerbaijani Turk for national culture against Russian Tsarism" and emphasized that, despite all difficulties, this struggle continued.

In another article published in the journal, it was highlighted that, despite all challenges, the ideas of national independence would break through, grow, and rise.

== The writing staff ==
It is difficult to provide a complete overview of the journal's writing team due to the presence of 139 different signatures. These are as follows:

A.B, L.A, Javad, A. Celik, A. Hamdi, A. Battal, A.K, A. Gurbangulu, Abdullah Battal, Abdullah Covdat, Abdulgadir. Ali Mardan, Ali Usta, an Azerbaijani resident in Europe, Ayaz Isaki, Ayin Kaf, Ali Asfar from Azerbaijan, Ali Kemal from Azerbaijan, Fuad from Azerbaijan, Gultekin from Azerbaijan, Kemal from Azerbaijan, Fathalgadir Suleyman, Bay Kara, Jafar Sadiq, Jafar Seyidahmed, D.S. Demir Dash, Demirchi oglu, Doctor Abdullah Covdat, Dur-Andish. E, E.A. Kafkazli, Karabakhli Sinan, Kazanli, Kazanli.A, Battal, Kazim, Kemal, qurbani Gulu, M., M.B, M. Garib, M.M.B, Mirza Bala, M.S. Sinan, Mahmud Fuad Toktar, Mahmud Fuad, Monastrli Bahaddin, Mehmet Ali Salih, Mammad Amin Rasulzadeh, Mehmet Fuad Toktar, Mirza Bala Mammadzadeh, Mirza Mammadzadeh, Milli, Mim Alif, Mim Garib, Mim, Mir Yaqub Mihriyev, Mirza Bala, Mirza, Muhammad Ali Salih, Reporter, Musavatchi, Mustafa Chokayoglu, Mustafa, Muzaffar Sharif, N., Nafia Shukr, Nejati, Ozan, P., A Muslim immigrant from Russia, S., Sanan, Sadri Maqsudi, S. Sanan, Suud Safvat, Sh.E, Sh.M, Sh., Shafi, Sahin, Shuk., T.E, Dashdemir, Tin, Turan, Ahmad Naim from Turkestan, Uzbek from Turkestan, Turkmen from Turkestan, Uran, Yagub Qadri, etc.

It is difficult to determine to whom these signatures belong. As seen from the signatures above, some authors used more than one pseudonym. Although it is challenging to reach a definitive conclusion about the ownership of these pseudonyms, some have been identified. It can be said that the actual number of writers for "Yeni Kafkasya" is significantly lower than the 139 signatures mentioned earlier; however, it is not possible to provide an exact number. In addition to this, 374 unsigned articles were published in the journal.

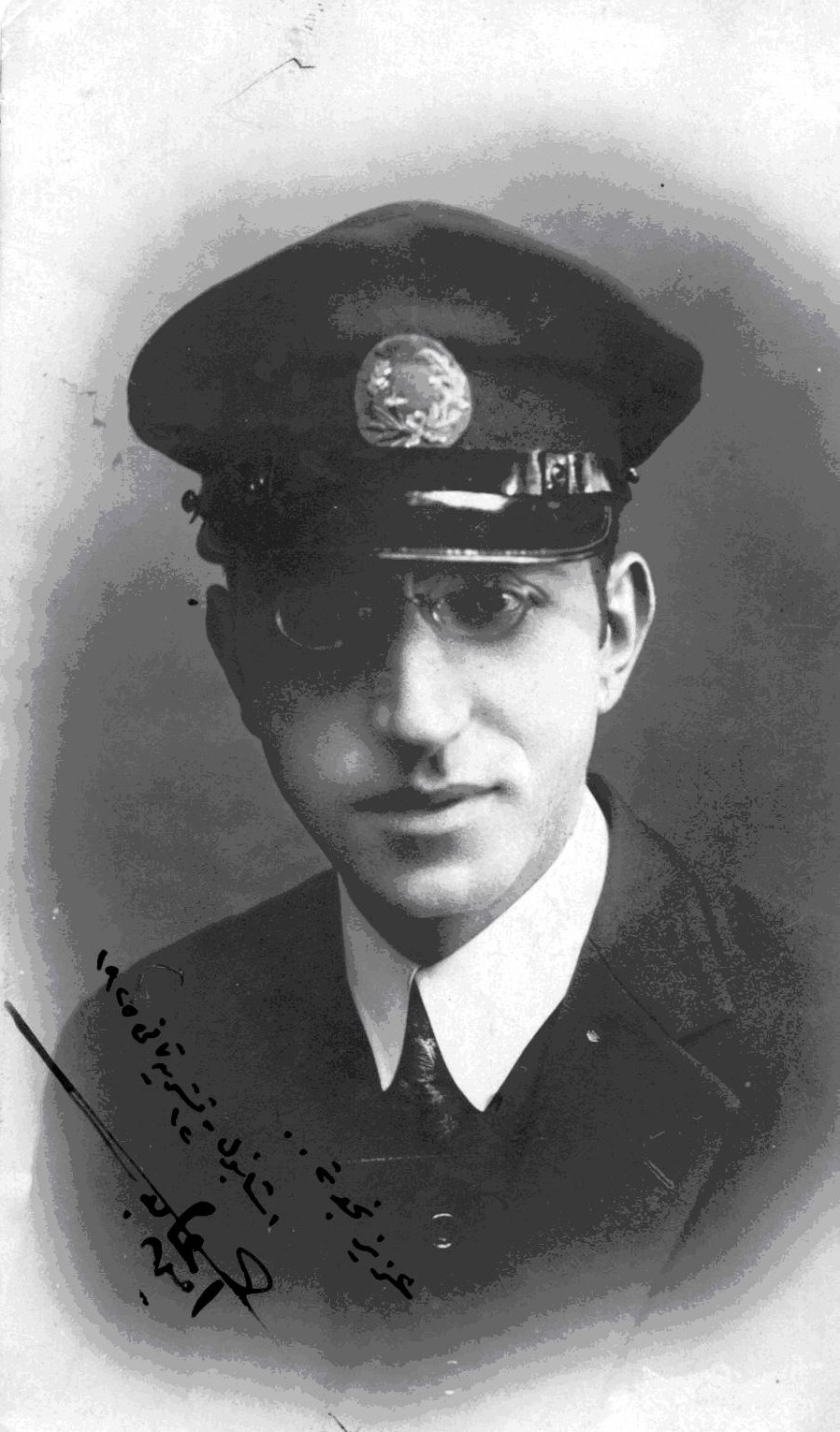
Amin Abid Gultakin, who published poems under the signature "Gultakin".

From the signatures and pseudonyms mentioned above, it is understood that the writers of the "Yeni Kafkasya" journal preferred to conceal their names. This was undoubtedly due to the publication of articles against Soviet Russia. The Bolsheviks closely monitored the journal's publication. However, there were also writers who did not hide their names and wrote with open signatures. Some of these individuals were well-known figures in the Turkic world. Writers and poets such as Mahamməd Amin Rasulzada, A. Zeki Vəlidi, Ayaz İshaki, Mehmet Fuad Toktar, Sədri Məqsudi, Yusif Akçura, Cəfər Seyidəhməd Krımər, Abdullah Battal, and Ahmad Javad were prominent intellectuals and artists recognized throughout the Turkic world. Alongside Rasulzada, Azerbaijani nationalists carried the main burden of the journal. Rasulzada was both the owner and the chief editor of the journal. Initially concealing his name, Rasulzada later began writing under his real name. However, it is not known how many articles Rasulzada wrote for the journal. On this subject, Səbahattin Şimşir writes in his book "Azerbaijan’s Struggle for Independence": "There are approximately 215 signed and unsigned articles in the 'Yeni Kafkasya' journal that we believe to belong to Mahammad Amin Rasulzada . According to our research, the author wrote a total of 42 articles under the signatures of Rasulzada M. A., Mahammad Amin, Mahammad Amin Rasulzada, and Mim Elif. We believe it is impossible to provide an exact figure for the unsigned articles. However, we estimate that almost all of the unsigned articles in the journal belong to Rəsulzadə."

In these writings, Rasulzada generally touched upon political issues and criticized communism. The author's main focus was nationalism. His series of articles, such as "The Failure of Revolutionary Socialism", which is a scientific critique of communism, was also published in book form. Another series of articles by the author is titled "The Triumph of Nationalism in Europe". In these articles, the author argued that communism could not find a place to survive in Europe and that the fundamental value sustaining nations is nationalism.

One of the writers who contributed the most articles to the journal was Mirze Bala Mammadzade. He wrote 70 articles under the signatures of Mammadzade Mirze Bala, M. Mirze Bala, Daşdemir, M.M.B, and M.B. Mirze Bala was also the author of three stories titled "Vətən qaldı", "On dəfə öldürülən", "İldırım". In addition to numerous political articles, he also wrote pieces on Azerbaijani literature. After Mirzə Bala, another frequent contributor was a writer who used the pseudonym "Azəri." "Azəri" wrote 52 articles, mainly political, in "Yeni Kafkaziya." The subjects of these articles typically focused on Azerbaijan, and the most severe attacks against the Bolsheviks were expressed in them. The identity of "Azəri" remains unknown. However, given the writer's consistent contributions throughout the journal's history and their deep understanding of the Bolsheviks' policies regarding Azerbaijan, it is possible to suggest that "Azəri" was someone close to Rəsulzadə. The author also wrote for successor publications of "Yeni Kafkasya," such as "Azəri Türk", "Odlu Yurd", and "Kurtuluş".

Apart from Azerbaijani writers, the most frequent contributor to the "Yeni Kafkasya" journal was Kazanlı Abdulla Battal (Taymas). Writing under the pseudonyms Abdullah Battal, A. Battal, Kazanlı, and Kazanlı Abdullah Battal, the author published a total of 16 articles on various topics ranging from criticism to biography, and from literature to culture. These articles, usually lengthy, were written with a scientific approach.

Of the 49 poems published in the journal, six were unsigned. The other 43 poems belonged to poets such as Gültəkin, Əhməd Cavad, Əli Usta, Azəri-zadə, B..., Almas İldırım, Gülsərən, Huseyn Javid, Nafia Şükrü, Sinan, and Suut Saffet. Six of Əhməd Cavad's poems were published in the journal, making him the second most frequently published poet after Gültəkin. Gültəkin was the leading poet of the journal, with 21 of his poems published. These poems touched on themes such as love for the homeland and nation, heroism, and bravery. In some of the poems, the Bolshevik Russian occupation was fiercely criticized. Mirzə Bala, in "Yeni Kafkasya," referred to Gültəkin as the "poet of the fire of independence." Gultəkin's real name was Əmin Abid. He came to Istanbul in 1920 and studied at the Faculty of Literature there. During his student years, he wrote poems under the pseudonym Gültəkin, focusing on themes of homeland and independence. His poetry collection "Buzlu Cəhənnəm" (Icy Hell) was also published in Istanbul. The poet had a dissertation on the history of Azerbaijani literature at the Istanbul Turkology Institute. In 1927, Əmin Abid returned to Baku, where he prepared Mirzə Fətəli Axundzadə's works for publication and published numerous articles on Azerbaijani literature in Baku. Əmin Abid wrote his poems in Turkish as spoken in Turkey.

== Publication policy ==
The publishing policy of "Yeni Kafkasya" was designed for political struggle. This struggle was for the independence of all Turkic nations, including Azerbaijan, and later for the liberation of all captive nations forced to live under the rule of Communist Russia. The main goal of the journal was to raise a new generation that would restore Azerbaijan’s independence. It aimed to convey to the new generation that Azerbaijan was already a state and that this state was temporarily occupied. Throughout its publication life, the journal showed dedication in highlighting Azerbaijan’s historical and cultural identity and did not hesitate to provide information about its full potential. In this way, the journal instilled in the youth the understanding that Azerbaijan was a well-established state with the right to live independently and fostered a sense of responsibility to care for it.

The problems of patriotic youth were the subject of almost all writings in the journal, from news to poetry. The names of exiled and executed patriots were revealed, biographies of notable figures were written, and the misery experienced in Bolshevik prisons was discussed. In nearly every article, the reader was confronted with the brutality of Communist Russia. A significant portion of "Yeni Kafkasya" was dedicated to news, particularly to publicizing this brutality. In the last three to five pages of the journal, the atrocities of the Bolsheviks and the Cheka (Bolshevik intelligence agency) were conveyed to the world through stories of eyewitnesses, letters from correspondents sent from various places, and news based on foreign press sources. In fact, this brutality was not only publicized but sometimes harshly criticized in the pages of "Yeni Kafkasya."

The scope of "Yeni Kafkasya" was not limited to Azerbaijan alone. Events occurring throughout the Turkic world under Russian domination were illuminated in the journal's pages. In this sense, the journal took on the role of a flagbearer for the Turkic world. Closely following Russia's actions and ambitions regarding the Turks, the journal also covered political, social, and cultural topics within the Turkic world. Discussions regarding the linguistic and cultural unity of the Turkic world during this period were widely covered. The journal’s publishing policy aimed to keep the national spirit of the Turks alive. Other nations subjected to Russian invasion were also among the topics of "Yeni Kafkasya." While criticizing the Bolshevik policies towards these nations, the journal praised their national resistance against the Russians. Among them, Georgia was particularly discussed. In contrast to the hatred towards Armenia, which had betrayed Azerbaijan within the "Transcaucasian Federation" formed after the Bolshevik revolution, Georgia was regarded as a brotherly nation, and significant publications were dedicated to it (Georgian and Turkish intellectuals cooperated in the Prometheus Movement in Europe). The journal also closely followed political processes in neighboring Iran and kept an eye on the world policies of other major powers. Numerous articles and writings on the policies of these countries, particularly regarding Russia and the Turkic world, were included in the journal. Although "Yeni Kafkasya" was published in Istanbul, it deliberately did not feature articles about the newly established Republic of Turkey. Nevertheless, there were occasional articles about Turkey’s involvement in global political matters. The two main topics in articles related to Turkey were relations with Russia and the Sheikh Said rebellion. "Yeni Kafkasya " was the first link in the chain of nationalist publications established by Azerbaijani Turks in Istanbul, a chain that continues today. As such, all matters concerning Turkism found expression in its publications, and its publishing policy served as a guide for journals and newspapers created later with the same purpose.

== Topics covered by the magazine ==
=== Political issues ===
The "Yeni Kafkasya" journal functioned as a literary, social, and political publication. However, its political aspect outweighed the others. To understand this characteristic of the journal, it is sufficient to compare its publications based on the types of topics covered. The total number of political articles in the journal, excluding news, was several times greater than the articles on all other subjects. Even the news often had a political focus. Aside from the news, the distribution of article topics by percentage was as follows: History: 4%, Literature: 12%, Various Social Topics: 14%, Politics: 70%.

It would not be wrong to call the "Yeni Kafkasya" journal a political publication created to secure Azerbaijan's independence. It was the first political journal published in the Turkic world against communism, which threatened the entire world, and while its goal was to see Azerbaijan independent, it did not shy away from defending the freedom of all nations under Bolshevik domination. According to "Yeni Kafkasya": "Bolshevik communism, which came to power by promising freedom and equality to other nations, is no different from Tsarist Russia. The Russification policy carried out during the Tsarist era is being continued by the Bolshevik communists, and all the resources of oppressed nations are exploited for the benefit of the Russian race. The Russians are trying to spread communist revolution worldwide to neutralize other great powers that may hinder their ambitions. They have created a vast propaganda network for this purpose across the globe. However, this revolution has no chance of succeeding. The major powers, sensing this threat, took the necessary measures and stopped the spread of communism in Europe. In the East, both peasants and workers are being oppressed by communism." The series of articles titled "The Failure of Revolutionary Socialism" written by Mahammad Amin Rasulzade is an example of such critical articles.

During its publication period, "Yeni Kafkasya" was an influential journal not only in Turkey but also among all the Turkic peoples of Russia and in Europe. In the first issue of the second year, the scope of this influence was expressed in an article titled "Transition to the Second Year." As indicated by the excerpt from this article, "Yeni Kafkasya" was closely monitored by the communist administration in Moscow, other administrative centers of Russia, and especially in Azerbaijan, and it also held great influence among the people.

We take great satisfaction in seeing that our publications are not in vain, as evidenced by the Bolshevik policies and the occasional articles in the press discussing events and life in the Caucasus. We feel with complete joy that we have had a beneficial impact on the broader public. Additionally, our journal, which delivers distressing news about the groans, oppression, and suffering of the Turkic and Islamic peoples under Bolshevik brutality, has reached key centers from Anatolia, Iran, Egypt, India, Afghanistan, and other Eastern countries. Even among our partners and friends, it has been met with high demand and care. ... Since its inception, we have dedicated our journal not only to Azerbaijani Turks but also to all Turks living beyond national borders, and we have greatly needed their support.

The issues raised by "Yeni Kafkasya" were reflected in the press of Azerbaijan and Tbilisi, where smear campaigns were launched against the journal. In response, the journal addressed these attacks in its pages. Through the examination of these writings, many obscure events of the time have been uncovered. It is possible to find important details in the journal regarding events that took place in Russia, the Caucasus, and Iran during the years when "Yeni Kafkasya" was being published.

=== Articles on literature ===
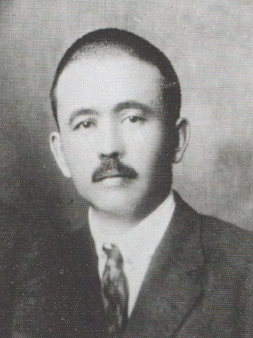
Fathalgadir Suleyman (Abdulgadir Inan) from Bashkortostan

In "Yeni Kafkasya," literary genres such as essays, poems, and stories were also featured. However, as previously mentioned, literary texts were significantly fewer in comparison to other types of writings. Moreover, even in literary works, indirect political objectives were pursued. For this reason, it is difficult to completely separate literary articles from the others. Nonetheless, thirty-six literary articles have been identified based on their content. These literary articles focused on topics related to the literature of the Turkic world. They highlighted both the post-occupation conditions of the Turkic world, from Altay to Azerbaijan, and how these conditions impacted national ideals and literature. On the other hand, cultural and literary developments were also reflected in these writings. By closely monitoring the negative actions of Russians against Turkic culture, intellectuals of the Turkic world were drawn to these issues. In this context, significant attention was given to the Turkology Congress held in Baku. The discussions on the Latin alphabet, which were raised during this congress, were extensively covered in the journal. A substantial portion of the literary articles was dedicated to Azerbaijani literature. The writer known by the pseudonym "Azəri" (1924) discussed the Bolshevik literature being developed through "Worker Schools" established by the Russians in Azerbaijan. Mirzə Bala wrote a series of important articles on the history of Azerbaijani literature. The author also responded to the Bolshevik attacks on Azerbaijani literature with serious articles. Another signature that contributed to writings on Azerbaijani literature belonged to Sinan. The author wrote a large article on Azerbaijani folk literature and several unsigned articles discussing various aspects of Azerbaijani literature. Among these, special attention should be given to the articles related to Azerbaijani press, which provided a chronological listing of journals and newspapers published in Azerbaijan up to that point, presenting many names. However, the articles on literature in the journal were not limited to these topics. Particularly important ideas regarding the cultural unity of the Turkic world were discussed in high-level articles. Writers from different parts of the Turkic world contributed various thoughts on culture and literature, publishing their ideas in a series of articles in the journal, turning their views into topics of discussion. These writings were significant as they demonstrated how Turkic intellectuals of the time viewed the issue of cultural unity within the Turkic world. Turkic intellectuals such as Kazanlı Abdullah Battal (Taymas), Fəthəlqədir Süleyman from Bashkortostan, and Mehmet Fuad Toktar engaged in extensive discussions about the language and literature of the Turkic world under the title *The Issue of National Culture Among the Turks Abroad*. In an article titled *In the Kazan Region* sent to "Yeni Kafkasya" under the signature Kazanlı, Abdullah Battal (Taymas) spoke about a common literary language, writing: "The geographical expanse in which the literature written in this language is read is proportional to the vastness of the dispersed geographical environment of the Kazan Turks."

The author, evaluating the emergence of such a literary language as the result of a twenty-three-year civil movement, stated: “…this literary language could also serve as the basis for a common literary language for the Central Turks (i.e., Kazanlıs, Kazakh-Kyrgyz, and Turkestanis). If these Turks, for the sake of national ambitions, abandon their local dialect chauvinism and get along well among themselves, and if the current literary language of the Idil region gravitates towards Kazan, I have no doubt that there is a possibility for the emergence of a common literary language for approximately twenty million Central Turks, that is, for a Turkic region stretching from the Idil basin to the Zarafshan valley." The author indicated that the Bashkirs were preventing this formation. In response, Fəthəlqədir Süleyman from Bashkortostan accused Kazanlı of trying to create an "independent Tatar literary language" and argued that the region in question was under strong Russian influence, which rendered the Idil region incapable of forming a national culture.

Fəthəlqədir Süleyman, stating that "if the Tatar language and literature have lasted for 20 years, the literature of Turkestan, which is our common national heritage, has lasted for several centuries," proposed the creation of a literary language in the Bashkir dialect that would belong to all the Turks of Central Asia. He argued, "The Tatar language is not a common literary language; it is a tribal dialect alongside our Bashkir and Kyrgyz dialects." The author also expressed his belief that Bashkir literature was more suitable for the Bashkirs than Tatar literature. Fəthəlqədir Süleyman summarized his views on the literature of the Turkic world by stating: "We are among those who believe that Bashkir literature will be more beneficial to the Bashkirs than Tatar literature in order to protect and defend our national Turkic customs from Russian traditions. In our opinion, two literary languages are suitable for the general Turkic peoples: Chagatai-Uzbek for the Eastern Turks and Anatolian Turkish for the Western Turks. It is the right of the Turkestanis, who are the successors of the Chagatai, to propose a common literary language for all Central Turks."

Mehmet Fuad Toktar, joining the discussion with a lengthy article, responded to Kazanlı and Fəthəlqədir Süleyman from Bashkortostan, strongly opposing the classification of Turkish as Southern Turkish, Central Turkish, and so on. The author, who proposed that a dialect belonging to a country that can be politically, culturally, and literarily independent in any era should become the common language, expressed his view on the matter as follows: “In my opinion, these three factors are in the hands of our Anatolian friends today. Whether they like it or not, the Anatolian dialect will be used as the literary and written language of the general Turkish language.” While accepting Anatolian Turkish as the common written language, Toktar rejected the use of Istanbul Turkish. “The Istanbul dialect we use today is a language mixed with 80% Arabic and Persian words, which is neither Turkish, Arabic, nor Persian. It has not been accepted and will not be accepted, not only by the Turkic peoples but even by the Anatolian Turks themselves.” The author also stated, "When it comes to national civilization and literature, in the past half-century, the three guiding stars of Turkicness—Anatolians, Azerbaijanis, and Tatars—can lead the way," thus advocating the idea of establishing a comparative general literature. Although this discussion continued for a while, no one responded to Mehmet Fuad Toktar. However, some leading writers of "Yeni Kafkasya," like Mirzə Bala, who did not participate in the debate, viewed the idea of using Turkish from Turkey as a common language positively. Considering the scope of "Yeni Kafkasya," it cannot be said that the journal was rich in poetry. Poems began to be published mainly in the second year of the journal, and very few poems were published in the third and fourth years. Alongside poetry, five stories were published in the journal. Three of these stories, which dealt with themes of freedom and patriotism, were written by Mirze Bala. One of the other stories belonged to Azerbaijani Fuad, and the other was signed by Mim.
