= Sabiha Sertel =

Turkish journalist, publisher, and activist

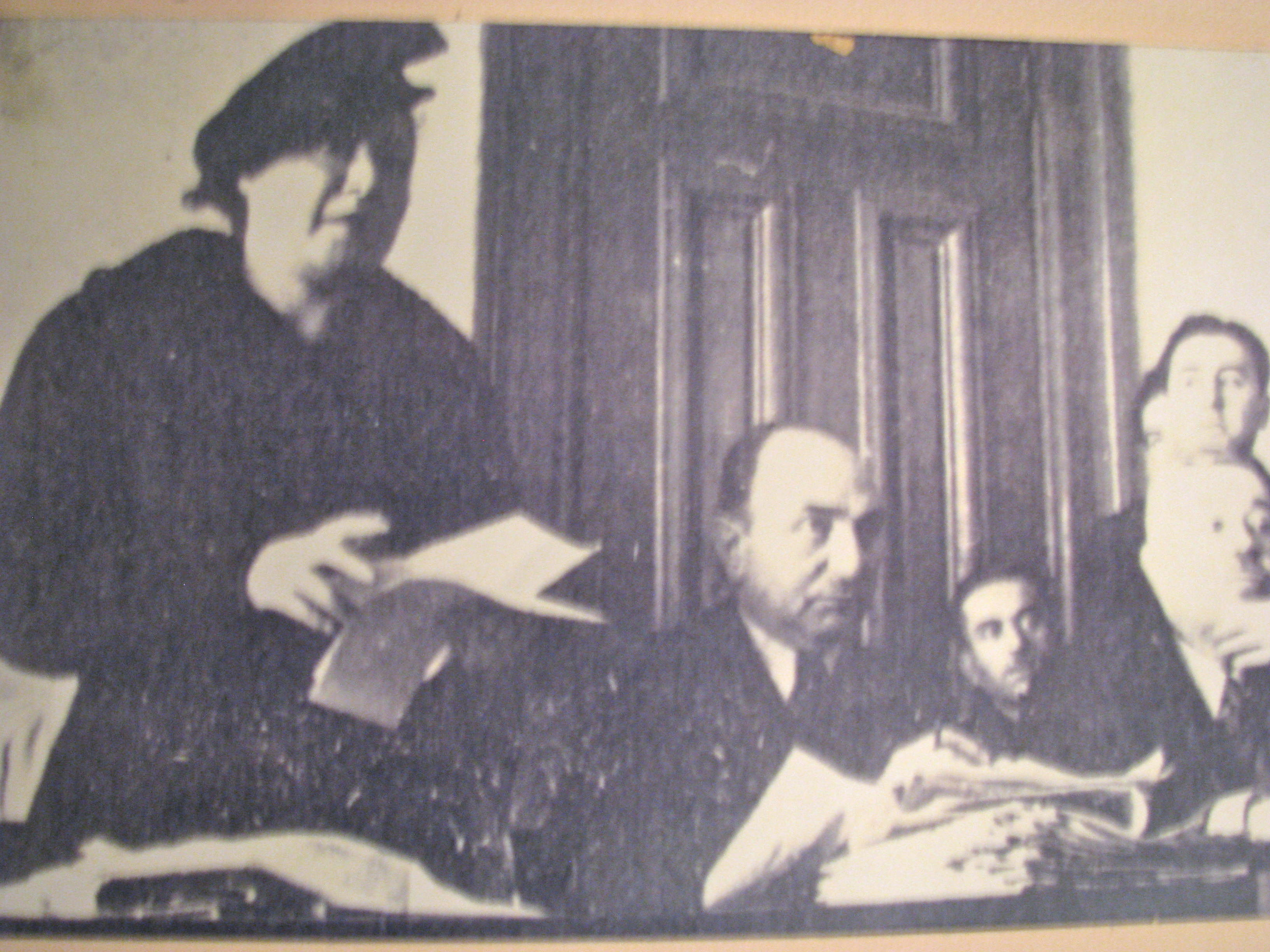
- Sabiha Sertel defending herself on trial, March 1946
- Born: Sabiha Nazmi; 1895; Salonica, Ottoman Empire (now Thessaloniki, Greece)
- Died: 2 September 1968 (aged 73); Baku, Azerbaijan Soviet Socialist Republic, USSR
- Education: Columbia University, New York School of Social Work
- Occupations: Journalist, publisher, author, social/political activist
- Spouse: Zekeriya Sertel

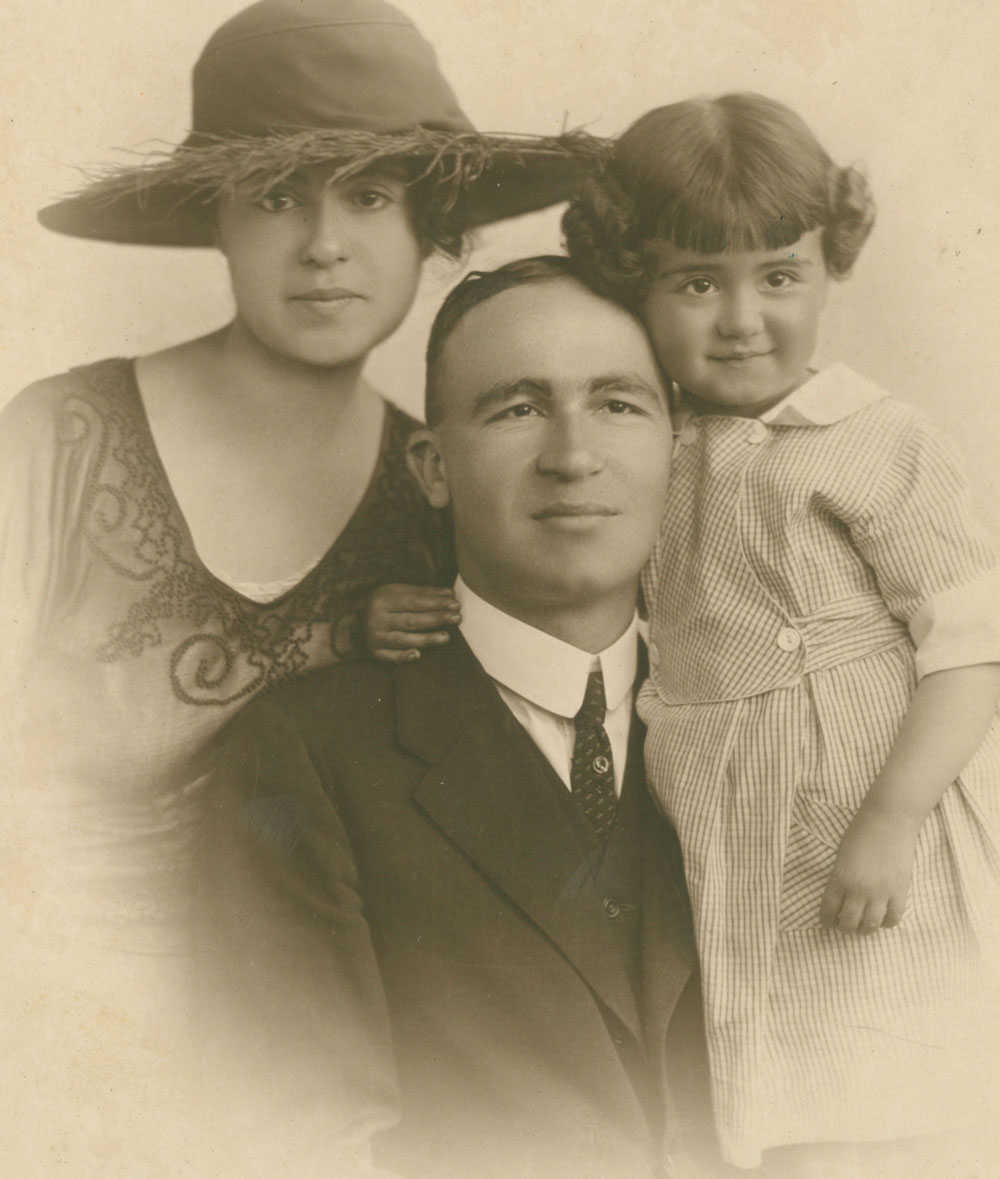
Sabiha Sertel with husband Zekeriya Sertel and daughter, Sevim, New York City, 1919

Sabiha Sertel (1895–1968) was the first professional female journalist and publisher in modern Turkey. Her articles and columns advocated for reforming the rights of women and workers and criticized state oppression, imperialism, fascism, and social inequalities in Turkey. Her high-profile activism for democracy, civil liberties and a free press resulted in social and political pressure, censorship, imprisonment and ultimately, exile. Sertel is considered the first member of the dönme community to marry outside the group. She was the first Turkish woman to be tried in court and imprisoned for her writings. She also was one of the first Turkish women to die in political exile.

Her marriage in 1915 to Zekeriya Sertel, a leading figure in the history of the Turkish press, began a lifelong publishing partnership. Their publications Büyük Mecmua (The Big Review), Resimli Ay, (Illustrated Monthly Magazine) and the newspaper Tan (Dawn), served as powerful platforms for opposition voices.

On 4 December 1945, a government-orchestrated mob of thousands destroyed the Sertels’ publishing house. In Sertel's autobiography Roman Gibi (Like a Novel), she chronicles the destruction, leading to their imprisonment and ultimately, exile. The book, written in 1968 from exile shortly before her death, was originally banned in Turkey.

== Early years ==
Sabiha Nazmi was born in 1895 in the Ottoman port city of Salonika (now Thessaloniki, Greece) to mother Atiye and father Nazmi. She was the youngest of six children. Her family was part of the dönmeh community, a small group that converted from Judaism to Islam in the 17th century but privately retained its beliefs and was viewed with suspicion by the empire's Muslim population. Sabiha's home was non-practicing and secular.

In her autobiography Roman Gibi, Sertel describes witnessing the starkly unequal relationship of her parents and domestic abuse of her mother. She traces her radicalization as a feminist at the age of eight to the evening when her mother returned home late from visiting her sister. Even though Atiye was supporting the family as a washerwoman, her father, a retired bureaucrat, flew into a rage and divorced her mother on the spot in accordance with Islamic law, throwing her out of the house.

Sertel attended the Terakki Mektebi (the Progress School) in Salonika, completing her high school education from 1902 to 1911. Although women were denied higher education, Sertel founded Tefeyyüz Cemiyeti (The Society for Advancement) with other young women who also wanted to continue their studies. She also began publishing essays, including submissions to a journal published by her future husband, Zekeriya Sertel. After the Ottoman Empire lost the Balkan War, she moved to Istanbul with her family in 1913.

In 1915, she married Zekeriya Sertel, a Turk, in a headline-making wedding paid for by the Young Turks Central Committee and publicized as an example of a future secular society. In his memoirs, Hatirladiklarim, Sertel describes Sabiha as the first dönme to marry outside of the community. In 1917, she gave birth to their first daughter, Sevim.

The couple started the journal Büyük Mecmua (Big Review) on March 6, 1919 with other intellectuals. Influenced by the first wave of feminism and the international women's suffrage movement, Sertel's articles for the publication focused on women's rights.

In her memoir, she elaborated on these years and described Büyük Mecmua as a vehicle for discussing ways of rebuilding the country, from Turkish nationalism and New-Ottomanism to socialism and feminism. The book traces the seeds of many of Atatürk's reforms after the War of Independence (1919-1923) to the intellectual debates in Büyük Mecmua, as well as the push for women's equal rights, providing an alternative point-of-view to traditional historical analysis.

In 1919, Zekeriya Sertel was imprisoned after the journal criticized the Western occupation of the country. Sabiha Sertel saved the publication by taking over editorial responsibilities despite heavy censorship in the post-war period. Her husband was released from prison but the journal closed down shortly afterward.

== United States, 1919-1923 ==
After Büyük Mecmua folded, Sertel moved to New York City with her husband and young daughter to continue their education with the help of scholarships arranged by the Turkish novelist Halide Edip. She earned her degree at Columbia University from what was then The New York School of Social Work. Sertel studied The Origin of the Family, Private Property and the State by Friedrich Engels and Woman and Socialism by August Bebel, which she later translated. Sertel also traveled the United States, unionizing Turkish and Kurdish factory workers as well as organizing fundraisers that raised $100,000 in support of the Turkish National Movement and war orphans. While studying, fundraising and unionizing, Sertel gave birth to her second daughter, Yıldız, on November 1, 1922.

== Resimli Ay, 1924-1931 ==
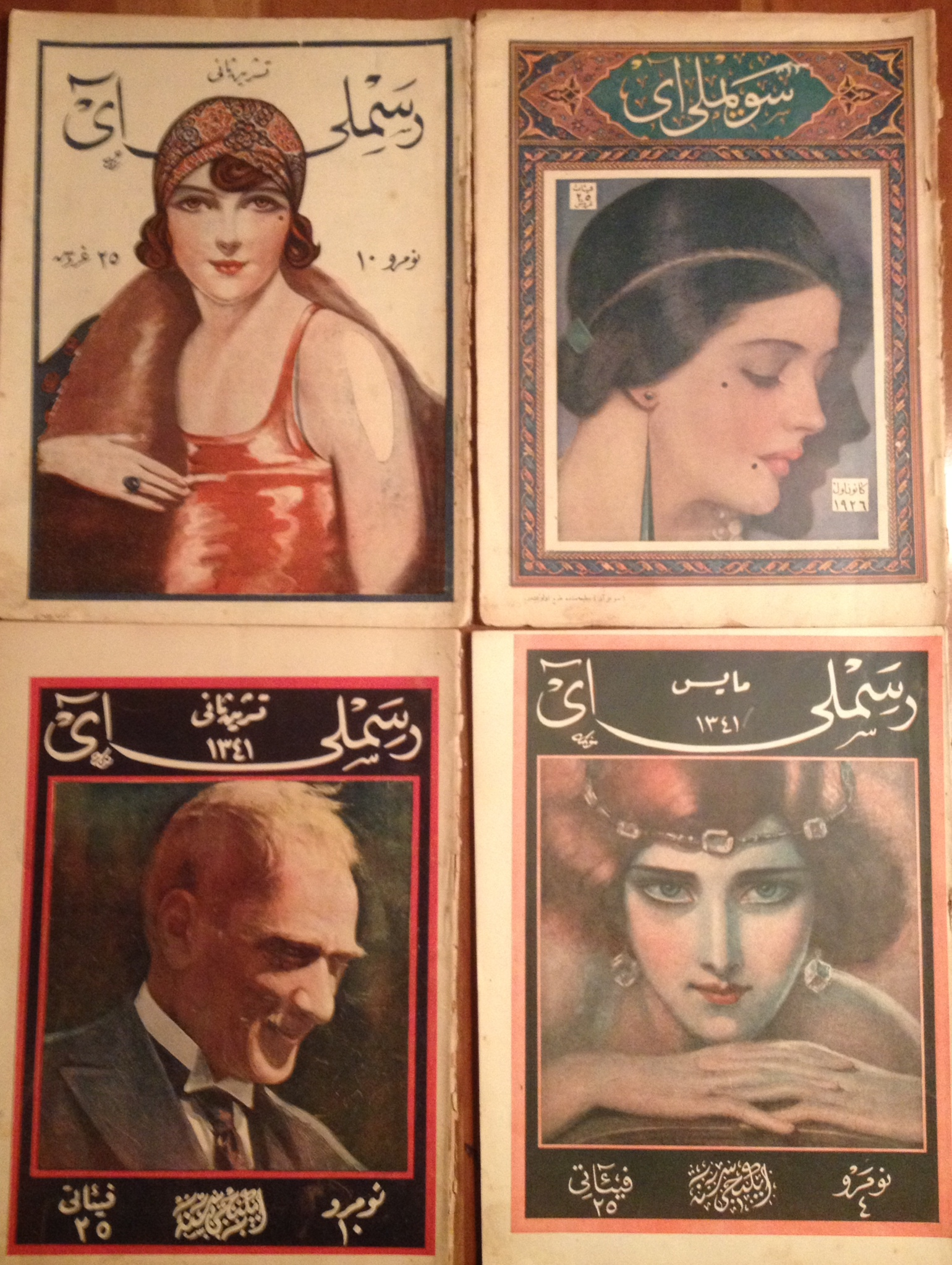
Resimli Ay

After completing her studies, the Sertels returned to Turkey in 1923 after the Turkish War of Independence, and settled in Ankara, the new capital. Sertel's daughters were six and two years old at the time. She was offered a position at the Society for the Protection of Children. Sertel proposed conducting a social survey to determine post-war living conditions of children as well as related issues, including the state of health, child labor, and education. The project was not approved, and upon her husband's resignation from his position as the General Directorate of Press and Information, they returned to Istanbul.

On February 1, 1924, the Sertels published the first issue of Resimli Ay (Illustrated Monthly), their second major publishing venture. Resimli Ay, modeled after popular illustrated American-style magazines, aimed to attract the general public as well as the country's elites. The journal became known especially for its advocacy of Turkey's literary avant-garde and progressive and socialist political ideas.

Among other writings, Sertel launched her popular advice column under the pseudonym "Cici Anne" (Sweet Mother) in one of the preeminent daily newspapers Cumhuriyet (Republic), providing advice to Turkish families struggling with social reforms and upheavals. She also temporarily took over as editor of Resimli Ay when Zekeriya was again imprisoned for an article he published. In addition to Resimli Ay, Sertel's column "Cici Anne" appeared in Resimli Perşembe (Illustrated Thursday) and she published Çocuk Ansiklopedisi (Children's Encyclopedia).

In 1928, the Turkish poet Nâzım Hikmet started working for Resimli Ay, where his groundbreaking free-form verse was introduced to readers. An avowed Communist, Hikmet remained a close family friend of the Sertels, as well as a major influence on their artistic and political views for the rest of their lives.

In 1930, Sabiha Sertel was again put on a trial, accused of insulting Atatürk with the translation of an article entitled “The Psychology of a Leader” from an American psychology journal.

As Resimli Ay’s political positions drew increasing attention from the police, its owners closed the journal down in 1931.

== Tan, 1936-1945 ==
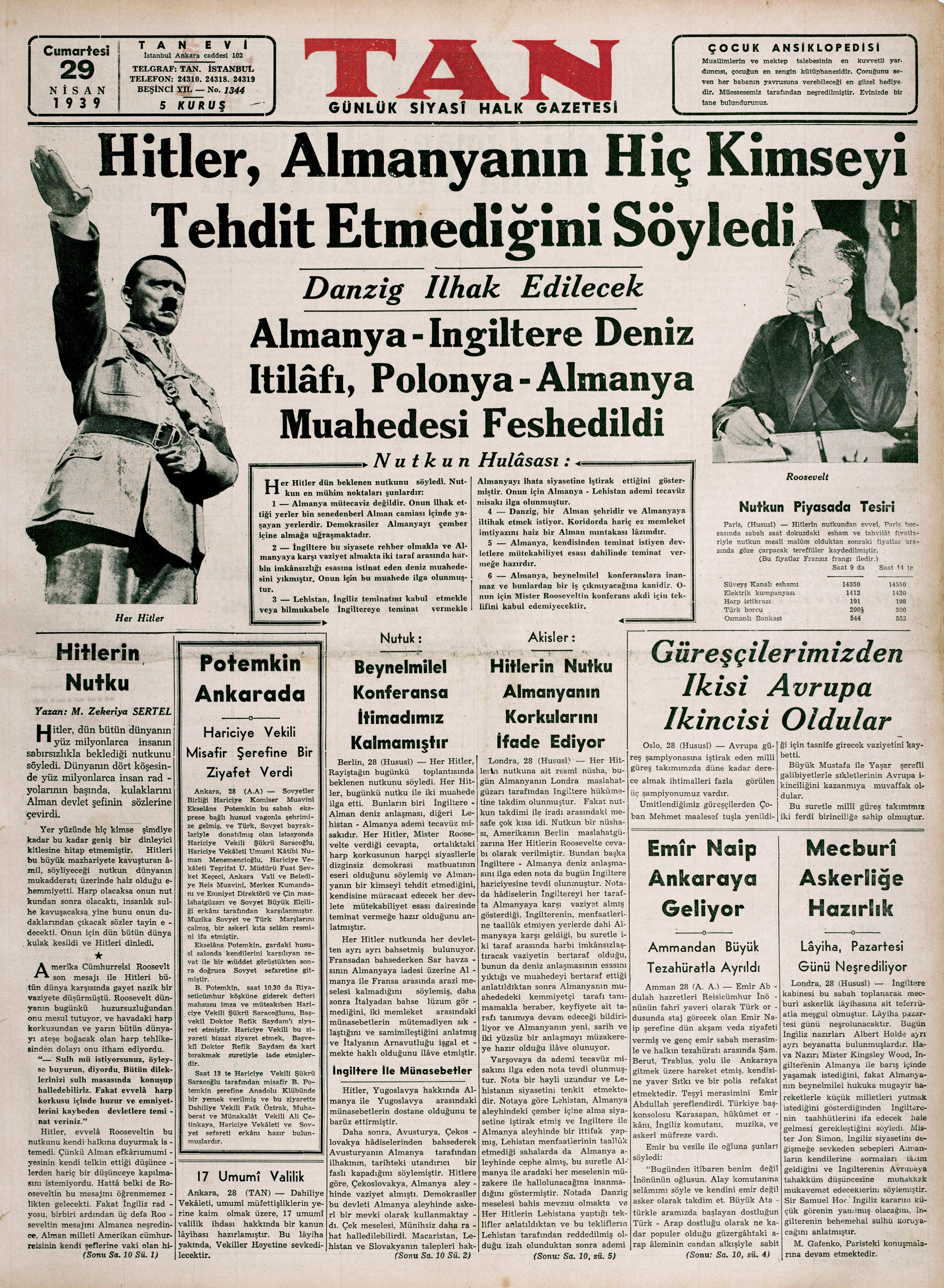
Tan front page, 1939 Headline reads: “Hitler Says Germany Threatens No One”.

Zekeriya Sertel became co-owner of Tan (Dawn), a struggling daily newspaper and publishing house. Under the Sertels, Tan became Turkey's second largest newspaper and the couple's final and most prominent publication.

In the lead-up to World War II and during the war itself, the newspaper was known for strongly opposing the ideas and policies of fascist and Nazi movements within Turkey and abroad. In her column “Görüsler” [Opinions], Sertel focused on political issues and warned against forming an alliance with Germany during the war. Critics attacked Sertel, publishing caricatures with insulting titles such as “The Bolshevik Wench” and “The Gypsy with the Pair of Tongs.”

Sertel was banned three times from writing, first, in 1941 for criticizing Turkey's collaboration with Germany during the war, second, for her writing against the nationalist movement in Turkey in 1942, and for the third time, again in 1942, for her writing about colonialism in the 19th century in relation to both world wars.

While banned from writing, Sertel pursued other projects including translating Karl Kautsky's The Class Struggle, Dialectical materialism, Vladimir Lenin’s Socialism and War and August Bebel's Woman and Socialism into Turkish. She also published Tan Cep Kitapları (Pocket Books) based on an American book series. In 1936, she wrote the novel Çitra Roy ile Babası (Çitra Roy and Her Father) about a young socialist woman living in India under British colonialism. She published the journal Projektör in 1936.

As the tension between leftist writers and the nationalist press increased, a government-orchestrated mob of thousands destroyed the offices of Tan and its publishing house on 4 December 1945. The destruction of Tan became an international incident. The Sertels were arrested, taken to Sultanahmet Prison in 1946, and put on trial. Although ultimately acquitted, the Sertels remained under police surveillance, unable to work. The couple decided in 1950 to flee the country, in fear of their lives.

== Exile and death, 1950-1973 ==
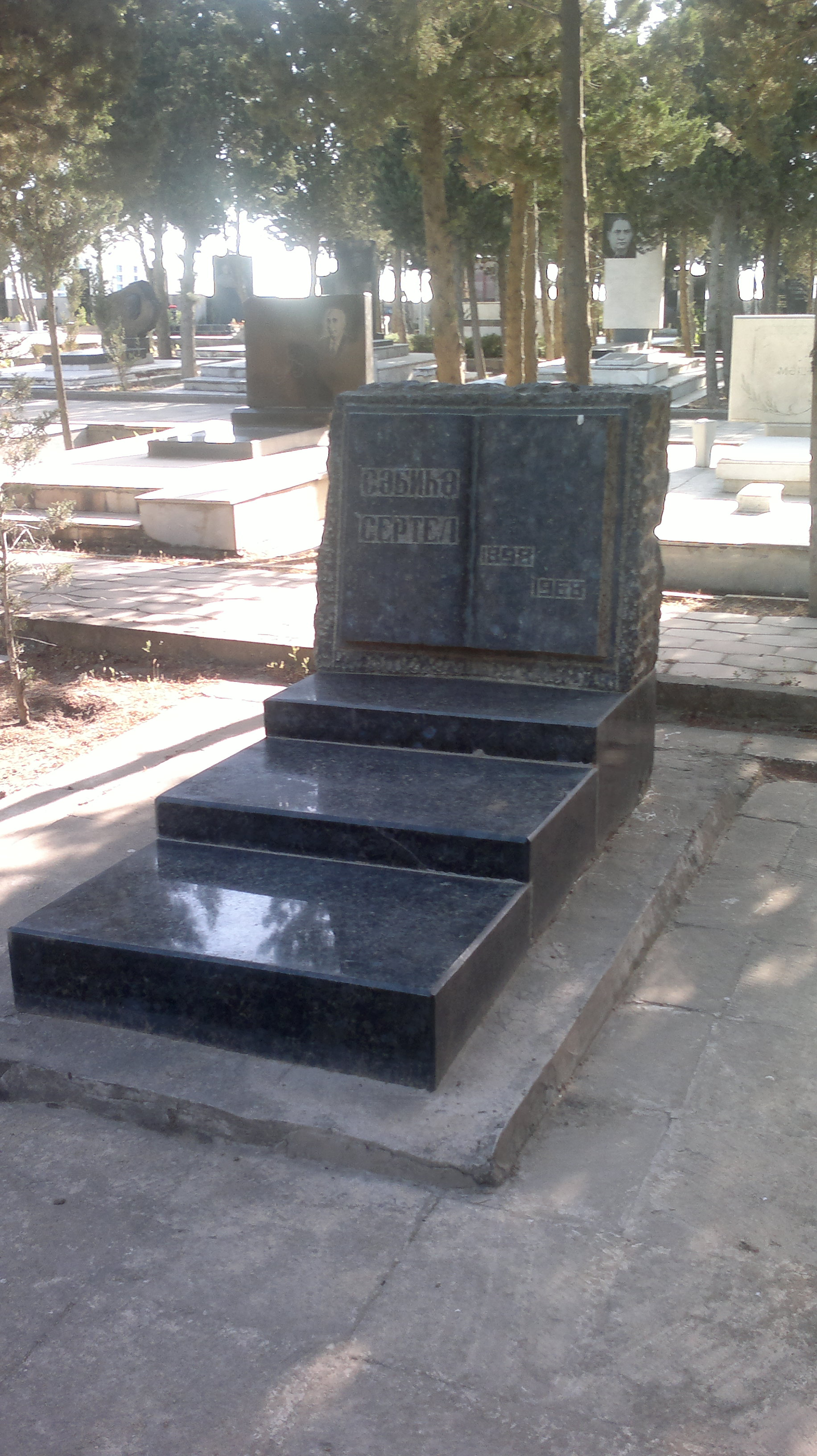
Grave of Sabiha Sertel in Baku, Azerbaijan

Sabiha Sertel spent the rest of her life in exile, living in Paris, Budapest, Leipzig, Moscow, and Baku in Soviet Azerbaijan. While in Budapest and Leipzig, she worked in radio for the Turkish Communist Party (TKP) abroad. In 1958, the Sertels secretly collaborated with Nâzım Hikmet on “Bizim Radyo”, a Communist-funded radio station broadcasting news to Turkey from Budapest. The Sertels agreed to write news and other content as long as it was uncensored and worked from Leipzig. Their involvement continued until 1962. With Hikmet's help, they relocated to Baku where Sertel's husband died from lung cancer on September 2, 1968.

Sertel remained a prolific author, writing her book about Tevfik Fikret, and memoirs about Nazım Hikmet and Sabahattin Ali, as well as her memoir Roman Gibi. The autobiography is limited to the period from 1915 to 1950, chronicling her rise and fall as a professional journalist and publisher.

== Views ==
Sertel contended that Turkey was not ready for a socialist revolution, and as a result she supported reforms of the new government. Nevertheless, she did not hold back from pointing out the undemocratic path that the new republic took. While she found the reforms of the new republic plausible in theory, including those regarding women's rights, she did not hesitate to criticize how they failed in practice.
