= History of newspaper publishing in the Arab world =

The history of newspaper publishing in the Arab world goes back to the 19th century, at a time when most of it was part of the Ottoman Empire. The Nahda was an important period for the development of newspaper publishing in the Arabic-speaking regions of the Ottoman Empire. During this period, a shift from government and missionary publishing to private publishing occurred. Especially in Egypt and Lebanon, newspapers became intertwined with daily life. Moreover, many editors were not only journalists but also writers, philosophers and politicians. With unofficial journals, these intellectuals encouraged public discourse on politics in the Ottoman Empire. Consequently, the rise of the press played an important role during the rise of Arab nationalism in the Ottoman Empire. Literary works of all genres were serialized and published in the press as well.

When Arab countries became independent in the 20th century, the press, as a participant in political debates, sometimes got repressed by the regimes and in other times benefited from the political transformation as it gave them the freedom to debate. For the national regimes, the press was a way to communicate to the people and form a new cultural identity. The press has been used as a medium of expression.

== Origins under Ottoman rule ==
=== European influences ===
The first newspapers in the Ottoman Empire were owned by foreigners living there who wanted to make propaganda about the Western world. The earliest was printed in September 1795 at the Palais de France in Pera, during the embassy of Raymond de Verninac-Saint-Maur. It was issued fortnightly under the title "Bulletin de Nouvelles", until March 1796, it seems. Afterwards, it was published under the name "Gazette française de Constantinople" from September 1796 to May 1797, and "Mercure Oriental" from May to July 1797. Its main purpose was to convey information about the politics of Post-Revolutionary France to foreigners living in Istanbul; therefore, it had little impact on local population.

In 1800, during the French occupation of Egypt, a newspaper in Arabic, Al-Tanbih (The Alert), was planned to be issued, with the purpose of disseminating in Egypt the ideals of the French Revolution. It was founded by the general Jacques-François Menou, who appointed Ismail al-Khashab as its editor. However, there is doubt the newspaper was actually ever printed. Menou eventually capitulated after Alexandria was besieged by British forces in 1801.

In 1828, Khedive of Egypt Muhammad Ali ordered, as part of the drastic reforms he was implementing in the province, (Note: Muhammad Ali had founded the first Egyptian printing office in Bulaq in 1821, so as to support his educational programme by producing books for the newly opened government schools. The printing press which the French had brought with them for their own use two decades earlier had left no traces.) the local establishment of the gazette Vekâyi-i Mısriyye (Egyptian Affairs), written in Ottoman Turkish in one column with an Arabic translation in a second column (Ottoman Turkish text was in the right one and Arabic text in the left one). It was later edited in Arabic only, under the Arabic title "Al-Waqa'i' al-Misriyya" (The Egyptian Affairs).

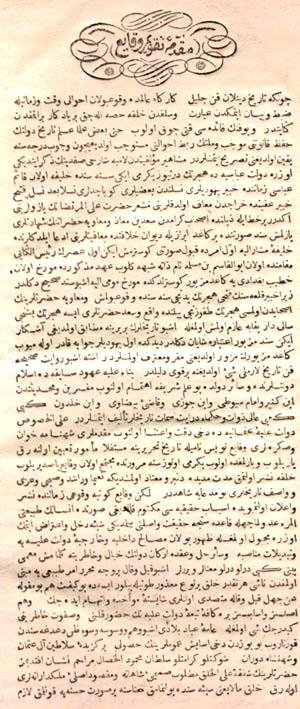
Takvim-i Vekayi (Calendar of Affairs)

The first official gazette of the Ottoman State was published in 1831, on the order of Mahmud II. It was entitled "Le Moniteur ottoman", perhaps referring to the French newspaper Le Moniteur universel. Its weekly issues were written in French and edited by Alexandre Blacque at the expense of the Porte. A few months later, a firman of the sultan ordered that a Turkish gazette be published, titled "Takvim-i Vekayi" (Calendar of Affairs), which would be effectively translating Le Moniteur ottoman, and issued irregularly until November 4, 1922. Laws and decrees of the sultan were published in it, as well as descriptions of court festivities.

The first non-official Turkish newspaper, Ceride-i Havadis (Register of Events), was published by an Englishman, William Churchill, in 1840. The first private newspaper to be published by Turkish journalists, Tercüman-ı Ahvâl (Interpreter of Events), was founded by İbrahim Şinasi and Agah Efendi and issued in October 1860; the owners stated that "freedom of expression is a part of human nature", thereby initiating an era of free press as inspired by the ideals of 18th century French Enlightenment. In the meantime, the first private newspaper written solely in Arabic, Mir'at al-ahwal, had been founded by a Syrian poet, Rizqallah Hassun, in 1855, but it had been suspended a year later by Ottoman authorities because of its critical tone regarding their policies. Subsequently, several newspapers flourished in the provinces. A new press code inspired by French law, Matbuat Nizamnamesi, was issued in 1864, accompanied by the establishment of a censorship office.

=== The Nahda ===
Newspaper publishing in Arabic-speaking parts of the Ottoman Empire experienced much development during the Nahda, as literacy increased in the Arab countries. This development did not occur in the same way nor at the same time throughout the region. The two countries in which newspaper publishing developed itself quickly are Egypt and Lebanon. Though this does not mean newspaper publishing did not reach other Arab countries. Eventually, countries such as Iraq and Syria followed.

The amount of newspapers in Egypt and Lebanon increased rapidly during the Nahda. Between the half of the 19th century up until the end, there were 394 Egyptian periodicals and fifty-five in Lebanon. The years following this period, the amount of periodicals kept increasing in both countries; in 1914 Egypt gained 216 new periodicals and Lebanon experienced an increase of 197 periodicals. Other regions in the Arab world stayed a bit more behind; from 1858-1908, there were eleven periodicals circulating in the regions of Palestine, Syria, Hejaz and Iraq.

Corresponding with the innovative spirit of the Nahda, the rise of newspaper publishing in the Arab world resulted in other developments. Newspapers offered an innovative way of publicity; advertisement began to be incorporated into the papers. Newspaper publishing during the Nahda also resulted in the emergence of new occupations such as proofreaders and newspaper vendors.

Newspaper publishing developed itself due to the shift from government publishing to private publishing during the Nahda. Previously, printing was mainly performed by governments and missionaries. Around the 1850s, a shift occurred; publishing became a more private domain, due to the interest in publishing by merchants and the bourgeoisie.

=== Women ===
One of the earliest women to sign her articles in the Arabic-language press was the female medical practitioner Galila Tamarhan, who contributed articles to the medical magazine Ya'sub al-Tibb (Leader in Medicine) in the 1860s. The Syrian writer and poet Maryana Marrash seems to have been the first woman to write in the Arabic-language daily newspapers. Marrash was the first woman who published without a pseudonym in the newspaper. In 1892, the Lebanese journalist Hind Nawfal published the first monthly journal for women, Al-Fatat (The Young Girl), in Alexandria, Egypt.

== After World War I ==
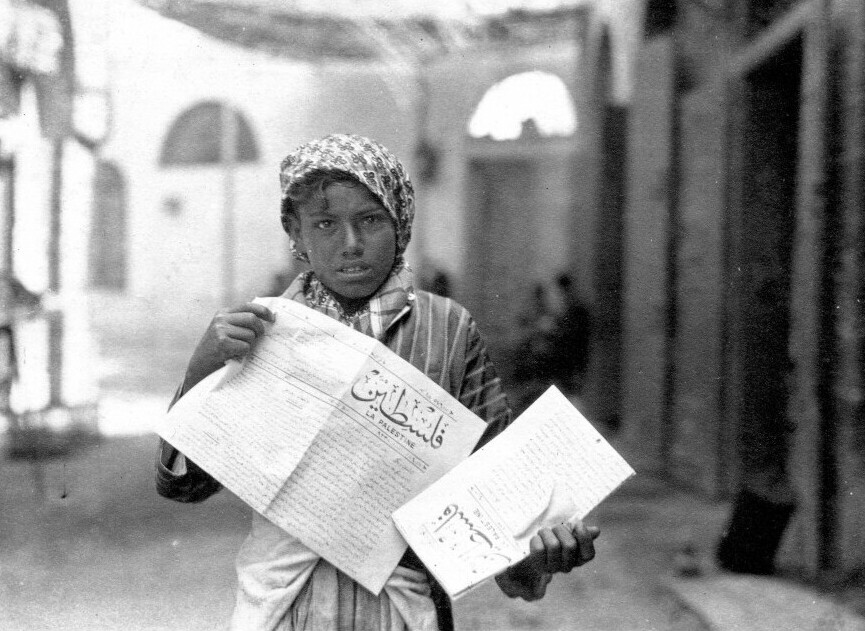
Street vendor selling copies of the Falastin newspaper in Jaffa, Mandatory Palestine in 1921

=== Arabian Peninsula ===
The first journals in the Arabian Peninsula appeared in Hijaz, once it had become independent of Ottoman rule, towards the end of World War I. When the region came under the rule of Saudi Arabia, one of these Hijazi journals, Umm Al-Qura (Arabic: Mother of the Towns), became the official gazette of Saudi Arabia. Two other daily newspapers appeared in the 1930s: Sawt al-Hijaz (Voice of the Hijaz) and al-Madina al-Munawwara (The Radiant City); their publication ceased during World War II but they both reappeared in Jidda in 1946 and 1947 respectively, the first having been renamed "al-Bilad al-Su'udiyya". The publishing of Fatat Shamsan in 1960 by Mahiya Najib marked the Arabian Peninsula's first women's journal.

=== Egypt ===
After World War I, the Ottoman Empire disintegrated, Egypt was occupied by the British and new political rules had to be implanted where the press played a big part in. The Western ideas and institutions that formed the previous political community undermined the traditional Islamic ideology that used to be the political community before the British occupation. The anti British feelings and demand for British withdraw was a thriving topic amongst political leaders in the Arab Middle East. The newspapers would often publish political debates and opinions and thereby enhancing public interests. Plus, with the rapid technological developments, the press developed quickly. After Egypt gained independence from Britain in 1922, the political leaders started their own news papers, discussing issues such as the search for a national/cultural identity, opposing British domination and conflicts within and among other political parties. A new political system had to be created whereby a combination of the traditional Islamic ideology had to be readjust. Therefore, the dynamic press became an open forum for national and political issues.

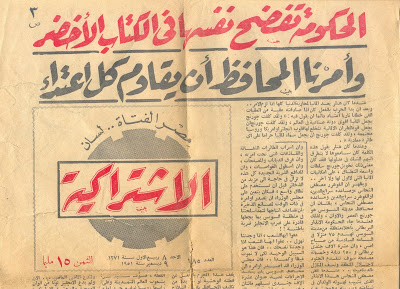
The militant nationalist political group, Misr al-Fatah.

==== Language standardization ====
With the rise of new foreign ideas, linguistic change appeared during the development of the press. The growing nationalist movement challenged the journalist to adapt the language to a broader audience. To propagate a national ideology, a negotiation over language standardization was necessary to reach all. It had a big effect on the transmission of ideas and knowledge as the public level of literacy rose and had the desire to consume news. For the public, the language standardization created a sense of belonging to the nation. They could express their identity in the social, cultural and political aspects of the press.

== See also ==
- History of Palestinian journalism

== Sources ==
- Ágoston, Gábor; Masters, Bruce Alan (2008). Encyclopedia of the Ottoman Empire. Infobase Publishing. ISBN 978-0816062591.
- Amin, Camron Michael; Fortna, Benjamin C.; Frierson, Elizabeth B. (2007). The Modern Middle East: a Sourcebook for History. Oxford University Press. ISBN 978-0199236312.
- Baron, Beth (1997). The Women's Awakening in Egypt: Culture, Society, and the Press. Yale University Press. ISBN 978-0300072716.
- Bosworth, Clifford Edmund; van Donzel, Emeri; Lewis, Bernard; Pellat, Charles, eds. (1991). Encyclopaedia of Islam. Volume VI. Brill. ISBN 978-9004081123.
- E. J. Brill's First Encyclopaedia of Islam, 1913–1936. 1987.
- Groc, Gérard; Çağlar, İbrahim (1985). La presse française de Turquie de 1795 à nos jours : histoire et catalogue (in French).
- Hill, Richard Leslie (1959). Egypt in the Sudan, 1820–1881. Oxford University Press.
- Long, David E. (2005). Culture and Customs of Saudi Arabia. Greenwood Publishing Group. ISBN 978-0313320217.
- Sakr, Naomi (2004). Women and Media in the Middle East: Power through Self-expression. I.B. Tauris. ISBN 978-1850435457.
- Stavrianos, Leften Stavros (2000) [first published 1958]. The Balkans since 1453. C. Hurst & Co. ISBN 978-0814797662.
- Tripp, Charles, ed. (1993). Contemporary Egypt: Through Egyptian Eyes. Routledge. ISBN 978-0415061032.
- Wendell, Charles (January 1972). The Evolution of the Egyptian National Image. University of California Press. ISBN 978-0520021112.
- Zeidan, Joseph T. (1995). Arab Women Novelists: the Formative Years and Beyond. State University of New York Press. ISBN 978-0791421727.
