= Cem (disambiguation) =

Cem Sultan (1459–1495) was a prince of the Ottoman Empire.

Cem or CEM may also refer to:

== Colleges ==
- College of Eastern Medicine, a branch of Southern California University of Health Sciences, in Los Angeles, California, US
- College of Emergency Medicine, now part of the Royal College of Emergency Medicine
- College of Estate Management, former name of the University College of Estate Management

== Organizations ==
- Christian Education Ministries, Australian school organisation
- Commission of Ecosystem Management, a commission of the International Union for Conservation of Nature
- Compagnie Électro-Mécanique, a former French electrical engineering manufacturer
- Companhia de Electricidade de Macau, a private public utility company of Macau
- Curtis Electromusic Specialties, an integrated circuit manufacturer
- Episcopal Conference of Mexico, Mexican assembly of Catholic bishops

== Science and technology ==
- Card Electromechanical, a computer hardware specification related to PCI Express
- CEM cell, a cell line derived from human T cells
- Central Electronic Module, of a Volvo; for example see Volvo 480
- Chain ejection model, a model explaining electrospray ionization in mass spectrometry
- Channel electron multiplier, in a vacuum tube
- Combined Effects Munition CBU-87 Combined Effects Munition, a US cluster bomb
- Composite epoxy material, a group of composite materials
- Computational electromagnetics, modeling the interaction of electromagnetic fields with physical objects and the environment
- Computational Engineering Model, an algorithmic framework for the generation of computational geometry, based on encoded engineering knowledge
- Contagious equine metritis, a type of metritis (uterine inflammation) in horses
- Cylindrical Energy Module, a type of engine

== Other uses ==
- Cem (given name), list of people with the name
- Cem (surname), list of people with the surname
- Cem (river), a river flowing through Albania and Montenegro
- Cem (magazine), a satirical magazine between 1910 and 1929 in the Ottoman Empire and then in Turkey
- Certified Emergency Manager, a credential from the International Association of Emergency Managers
- Certified Energy Manager, a credential from the Association of Energy Engineers
- Civil Emergency Message, a warning issued through the Emergency Alert System in the US
- Customer experience management
- Jem (Alevism) or cem, a ceremony of Alevism
- Central Airport's IATA code

== See also ==
- CEM-I, CEM-II, CEM-III, CEM-IV, CEM-V, types of cement
