= Bashar al-Shatti =

- Also known as: Basharno; Beesho; Maystro
- Born: Bashar Yaghob al-Shatti بشار يعقوب الشطي; 22 September 1982 (age 43)
- Origin: Kuwait City, Kuwait
- Genres: Khaliji
- Occupation: Singer-songwriter
- Instruments: Vocals; guitar; piano
- Years active: 2004–present
- Website: bashar.cc

Bashar al-Shatti (Arabic: بشار الشطي; born 22 September 1982) is a Kuwaiti singer, songwriter and actor, and plays piano and guitar. He began his career as an orchestra chorale member. He served as a judge in the singing competition Arab Idol.

== Star Academy ==
Bashar's fame started along with the reality television show Star Academy on LBC. There were rumors of a love affair between him and Moroccan contestant Sophia Marikh. Gulf News reported that teenagers welcomed him as a superstar. Bashar was the runner-up, but lost to Mohammed Attiyeh of Egypt.

The following October, according to an Al Bawaba report, police investigated al-Shatti following a scuffle in Marina Mall in Kuwait. The report stated that fans gathered for pictures and autographs at a coffee shop where he and his brother were sitting, and that al-Shatti got into a physical altercation with some young hecklers, who later called the police.

== Later career ==
After Star Academy, he signed a multi-record deal with Rotana Records. Al-Shatti recorded two records with Rotana. In 2008, he terminated his contract with Rotana to cooperate with Arab Radio and Television Network (ART) and release a third album. Al-Shatti has collaborated with Kuwaiti artist Nabil Shuail. Al-Shatti composes for television serials and cartoons, and has written religious music. He participated in the composition of the Alwatan TV inauguration operetta. Al-Shatti recently branched out into an acting career, taking a role on an MBC television series. Additionally, he was the artist panellist on Qualitynet's home video contest, "Fakkar Ana Khouf?" which was decided on 15 December 2012.

== Impact ==
In Arab Television Today, British media author Naomi Sakr described Al Shatti as "charismatic". Marwan M. Kraidy has called him "a pan-Arab heartthrob".

== Personal life ==
Bashar has three brothers and one sister. He married in early 2011. He has a son, Abdul Rahman. He has also voiced his views on the Syrian revolution, saying, "Aside from being an artist, I am first a human. It isn't human to accept murder, massacres and crimes against children."

== Discography ==
- Bashar Al-Shatti (Rotana, 2005)
- Thany Marra (Rotana, 2006)
- Akwa Men El Awal (ART, 2009)
