= Arseven =

Arseven is a surname. Notable people with the surname include:

- Celal Esat Arseven (1876–1971), Turkish painter, writer, and politician
- Rıza Arseven (1906–1989), Turkish fencer
- Nejat Arseven (born 1950), Turkish politician
- Ali Arseven (1976- ), German/ Turkish Entrepreneur and one of the most successful opticians worldwide
- Tara Arseven (1987- ), American/Turkish fine art and portrait photographer
