= Galila Tamarhan =

Egyptian physician

Galila Tamarhan (or Tamruhan) al-Habashiya (Arabic: جليلة تمرهان / ALA-LC: Jalīlah Tamarhān; d. 1863) was a medical practitioner in 19th-century Ottoman Egypt. She was one of the earliest women to sign her articles in the Arab press, by contributing "articles to a medical magazine called Yaasoub el-Tib (Leader in Medicine) in the 1860s". After completing her studies in 1847 at the nursing school of Abu Zaabal, she was appointed by the latter as an assistant schoolmistress, and was promoted in 1857 to the position of chief instructor, which she held until her death.

== Sources ==
- Abu-Lughod, Lila, ed. (2001). Remaking Women: Feminism and Modernity in the Middle East. Princeton University Press. ISBN 978-0691057927.
- Baron, Beth (1997). The Women's Awakening in Egypt: Culture, Society, and the Press. Yale University Press. ISBN 978-0300072716.
- Sadiqi, Fatima; Nowaira, Amira; El Kholy, Azza; Ennaji, Moha, eds. (2009). Women Writing Africa: the Northern Region. The Feminist Press at the City University of New York. ISBN 978-1558615892.
- Sakr, Naomi, ed. (2004). Women and Media in the Middle East: Power through Self-Expression. I. B. Tauris. ISBN 978-1850435457.
