= Mahia (disambiguation) =

Mahia is a township in New Zealand. Other meanings include:

== Places ==
- Mahia, Bihar, a village in Darbhanga district, Bihar, India
- Māhia Peninsula, Hawke's Bay, New Zealand
  - Mahia Beach, a township on Māhia Peninsula
  - Rocket Lab Launch Complex 1, also known as Mahia Spaceport, on Māhia Peninsula
- Mahia (New Zealand electorate)
- Mahia, Nigeria, in Adamawa state, Nigeria
- Mahia Park, a suburb of Auckland, New Zealand
- Te Mahia, Auckland, New Zealand
  - Te Mahia Railway Station
- Te Mahia Bay, an arm of Kenepuru Sound, New Zealand
- Te Mahia Saddle, a high point on New Zealand's Queen Charlotte Track

== People ==
- Mahia Blackmore, New Zealand singer
- Adrián Mahía, Argentinian footballer
- Irene Mahía, Spanish television presenter
- José Carlos Mahía, Uruguayan politician
- Mahia Nagib, Yemeni journalist

=== In fiction ===
- Mahia, in the film The Decks Ran Red (1958)
- Mahia, in the film She Gods of Shark Reef (1958)

== Food and beverages ==
- Mahia (drink), a traditional Moroccan Jewish alcoholic beverage made from dates

== Other ==
- Mahia (folk music), a variety of Punjabi folk music
- Mahia (Jal song), a 2007 song by Pakistani band Jal
- Gor Mahia F.C., a Kenyan football club
- Mahia whiptail, a species of fish
