= Cem (surname) =

Cem is a Turkish surname. Notable people with the surname include:

- Cemil Cem (1882–1950), Turkish diplomat, cartoonist, and journalist
- İsmail Cem (1940–2007), Turkish centre-left politician
