= Le Moniteur ottoman =

Ottoman French-language newspaper

- Publisher: Ottoman government
- Founded: 1831
- Language: French
- Ceased publication: 1840s

External image
- An issue of Le Moniteur ottoman

Le Moniteur ottoman was a newspaper written in French and first published in 1831 on the order of Mahmud II. It was the first official gazette of the Ottoman Empire, edited by Alexandre Blacque at the expense of the Sublime Porte. Its name perhaps referred to the French newspaper Le Moniteur Universel. It was issued weekly. Mahmud II wished to influence Europeans. Takvim-i Vekayi was published a few months later, intended as a translation of the Moniteur into Ottoman Turkish.

== History ==
Le Moniteur ottoman was the first Ottoman bulletin. It was apparently inspired by Muhammad Ali's Al-Waqa'i' al-Misriyya, published in Egypt since 1828.

After having been edited by former Consul for Denmark "M. Franceschi", and later on by "Hassuna de Ghiez", it was lastly edited by Lucien Rouet. However, facing the hostility of embassies, it was closed in the 1840s. The title of the publication was used in Othōmanikos Mēnytōr (Greek: Οθωμανικός Μηνύτωρ), the Greek edition of Takvim-i vekayi.

== See also ==
- Media of the Ottoman Empire
- History of Middle Eastern newspapers

== Sources ==
- Annuaire des deux mondes : histoire générale des divers États.
- Ubicini. A. État présent de l'empire ottoman.
- L'ami de la religion.
