= Le Stamboul =

Defunct French newspaper in the Ottoman Empire (1875–1962)

Le Stamboul was a French language newspaper published from Constantinople, the entirety of which is now known as Istanbul, in the Ottoman Empire and then in Turkey from 1875 to 1962. It was the leading French newspaper in the city. As of the beginning of the 20th century it was estimated to have a daily circulation of around 5,000. The founders of the paper were Irish brothers, John Laffan Hanly and Baron Henry Laffan Hanly. The latter was the director and the former was the founding editor. Pierre Le Goff was one of the editors-in-chief of the paper which was published six days per week.

The name "Stamboul", the rendering of "Istanbul" used in French, referred to the portion of the city in the old city walls and not the entire city; the name "Istanbul" became used for the entire city in Turkish post-1923, and the new Republican Turkish government requested foreign embassies and companies switch to Istanbul in 1930. In 1934 the paper was also renamed as Istanbul.

== See also ==
- Media of the Ottoman Empire
