= Christine Philliou =

Historian of the Ottoman Empire and post-Ottoman Greece and Turkey

- Other name: Christine M. Philliou

Academic background
- Education: Columbia University; Princeton University
- Thesis: (2004)

Academic work
- Discipline: History
- Sub-discipline: History of the Ottoman Empire; modern Greek history; modern Turkish history; comparative empires
- Institutions: University of California, Berkeley; Columbia University
- Notable works: Biography of an Empire; Turkey: A Past Against History

Christine M. Philliou (Greek: Χριστίνα Μ. Φίλιου) is a Greek American historian of the Ottoman Empire and the post-Ottoman Balkans and Middle East. She is a professor of history and Director of the Center for Middle East Studies at the Berkeley University of California, where she has also served as Chair of the Department of Middle Eastern Languages and Cultures (MELC), and also as director of the university's programs in Modern Greek and Hellenic Studies, and Turkish, Ottoman and Post-Ottoman Studies.

Philliou studies the entwined histories of the Balkans and Middle East from the 17th century onwards, particularly the forms of political authority, mediation and dissent that accompanied the transformation of the Ottoman Empire and the formation of the Greek and Turkish nation states. Her work also addresses comparative imperial history, Orthodox Christian communities under Ottoman rule, and the cultural and political relationships connecting Europe and the Middle East.

== Education and academic career ==
Philliou received her B.A. from Columbia University, where she studied labor history and Modern Greek studies. After graduating, she lived in Thessaloniki and Istanbul. She has described these experiences as formative in her decision to study the dissolution of the Ottoman Empire and the historical relationships among its successor societies.

Philliou earned an M.A. in Near Eastern Studies from Princeton University in 1998, followed by another M.A. in History, and finally a Ph.D. in 2004. Her graduate work focused on the significance of the Greek Revolution and the emergence of Greek nationalism on Ottoman state and society.

Philliou taught Ottoman and modern Turkish history at Columbia University, getting tenured there in 2014 before joining the faculty of the University of California in Berkeley in 2015. At Berkeley, she became a professor in the Department of History and an affiliated faculty member in Middle Eastern Languages and Cultures and Modern Greek and Hellenic Studies. She subsequently served as chair of the Department of Middle Eastern Languages and Cultures.

== Scholarship ==
=== Ottoman governance and the Phanariots ===
Philliou's first monograph, Biography of an Empire: Governing Ottomans in an Age of Revolution, examines Ottoman governance from the late 18th to the middle of the 19th century through the career of Stephanos Vogorides, also known as Stefanaki Bey. Vogorides belonged to the Phanariots, a group of Orthodox Christian families who occupied influential positions within the Ottoman political order before the outbreak of the Greek Revolution in 1821. She traces the crisis and transformation in Ottoman governance brought on by the Greek Revolution, and the ways that those Phanariots who remained loyal to the sultan adapted to the new realities.

Rather than treating the Ottoman state and its Christian subjects as separate or uniformly antagonistic entities, Philliou reconstructs the personal, familial and institutional networks through which governance operated. Her account situates the Phanariots within the Ottoman–Russian rivalry, provincial administration, diplomacy, the Greek War of Independence, and the political reorganization preceding the Tanzimat. The book uses biographies to reconsider the conventional divisions among Balkan nationalism, the Ottoman Tanzimat and European imperial intervention in the empire's affairs. Reviewers have noted its use of Ottoman Turkish, Greek, French and English sources and its interpretation of governance as a field extending beyond formal state institutions.

In “Communities on the Verge,” which examines the Phanariot ascent in Ottoman governance between the 17th century and the Greek Revolution, Philliou argued that the Phanariots' political position emerged from an unstable conjunction of imperial military crises, foreign relations, religious difference and the practical needs of government.

=== Empire and post-Ottoman history ===
Philliou has approached Greece, Turkey, the Balkans and the Middle East as interconnected components of a post-Ottoman historical field. This approach questions national historiographies that separate the Greek, Turkish, Balkan and Middle Eastern experiences into discrete narratives. Her work instead examines the administrative practices, political concepts, elite networks and contested memories that persisted across the transition from empire to nation states.

In an article co-authored with Alan Mikhail, Philliou surveyed the “imperial turn” in Ottoman historiography. They assessed the growing use of comparative imperial frameworks and considered how those frameworks had altered interpretations of Ottoman political transformation, periodisation and relations amongst imperial institutions, provincial actors and local communities.

Her work on the memory of Ottoman empire has also examined the production of an Ottoman past in the early Turkish Republic. Rather than understanding 1923 as an historical rupture, she analyzes how Ottoman experience continued to shape republican political language and historical consciousness despite the official historical narrative of Kemalist Turkey.

=== Political opposition and modern Turkey ===
Philliou's second monograph, Turkey: A Past Against History, presents a history of political opposition and dissent from the late Ottoman period through the early decades of the Turkish Republic. The study is organized around the life and writings of Refik Halit Karay, an Ottoman and Turkish journalist, satirist and novelist who experienced several regimes and two periods of exile.

The book uses the Turkish concept of muhalefet, encompassing both political opposition and dissent, to trace political and cultural continuities into the Republic of Turkey. Philliou argues that in the absence of a continuously functioning opposition party between 1908 and 1950, opposition existed as an intellectual, literary and partly imagined political space. The word “muhalefet” in some ways acted as a surrogate for an institutionalized, partisan opposition. She argues that Karay's writings provide a means of examining this space under the Second Constitutional Era, the Committee of Union and Progress, the Turkish independence movement, the single-party republic and the multiparty system that began after the Second World War. Reviewers have characterized the book as an intellectual and political biography that uses Karay's career to examine continuity, rupture and the politics of memory between empire and republic. Both monographs have appeared in Greek and Turkish translations.

== Digital and public humanities ==
Philliou leads İstanΠόλις, a collaborative digital project devoted to the social and spatial history of Greek Orthodox communities in Istanbul between 1821 and 1923. It brings together Ottoman and Greek documentary sources to reconstruct life within the wider history of the late Ottoman city.

In 2023, the project received a three-year grant from the National Endowment for the Humanities supporting the creation of a public digital resource about Istanbul and its Orthodox Christian communities during the 19th and early 20th centuries.

The İstanΠόλις served as the stepping stone for two more recent books: Naming Non-Muslims: A Guide to Reading Greek, Armenian and Jewish Male Names in Ottoman Sources (Asini Publications, 2026); and An Ottoman Pompeii: The Greek Revolution and the Limits of Conviviality in 1821 Istanbul (Koç University Press, 2026). The former is a reference work aimed at facilitating the accurate identification of non-Muslims, and thus their humanization as distinct individuals with historical experiences, occupations and social and kin networks rather than nameless (or inaccurately named) non-Muslims.

== Selected works ==
=== Books ===
Philliou, Christine M. (2011). Biography of an Empire: Governing Ottomans in an Age of Revolution. Berkeley: University of California Press. ISBN 9780520266339.

Philliou, Christine M. (2021). Turkey: A Past Against History. Oakland: University of California Press. ISBN 9780520276390.

=== Articles and chapters ===
Philliou, Christine M. (2001). "Mischief in the Old Regime: Provincial Dragomans and Social Change at the Turn of the Nineteenth Century". New Perspectives on Turkey. 25: 103–121.

Philliou, Christine M. (2008). "The Paradox of Perceptions: Interpreting the Ottoman Past through the National Present". Middle Eastern Studies. 44 (5): 661–675.

Philliou, Christine (2009). "Communities on the Verge: Unraveling the Phanariot Ascendancy in Ottoman Governance". Comparative Studies in Society and History. 51 (1): 151–181. doi:10.1017/S0010417509000073.

Philliou, Christine M. (2011). "When the Clock Strikes Twelve: The Inception of an Ottoman Past in Early Republican Turkey". Comparative Studies of South Asia, Africa and the Middle East. 31 (1): 172–182. doi:10.1215/1089201X-2010-063.

Philliou, Christine M. (2011). "The Ottoman Empire between Successors: Thinking from 1821 to 1922". In Spencer, Philip; Wollman, Howard (eds.). Nations and Nationalism: A Reader. Edinburgh: Edinburgh University Press.

Mikhail, Alan; Philliou, Christine M. (2012). "The Ottoman Empire and the Imperial Turn". Comparative Studies in Society and History. 54 (4): 721–745. doi:10.1017/S0010417512000394.

Philliou, Christine M. (15 May 2015). "The Armenian Genocide and the Politics of Knowledge". Public Books.
