= The Levant Times and Shipping Gazette =

- Type: Daily newspaper
- Format: Broadsheet
- Publisher: Roger Warde (UK edition, 1869)
- Editor: J. Laffan Hanly
- Language: English, French
- Headquarters: Ipsıck Khau, Perchembé Bazaar, Galata, Constantinople (Ottoman Empire)
- Circulation: "Very large" (Bradshaw's Guide)

The Levant Times and Shipping Gazette was a daily newspaper published in Constantinople (now Istanbul), Ottoman Empire, in both English and French. J. Laffan Hanly was the editor. It was established in 1868. In addition, to the newspaper published in Turkey, by 1869 it also had a bi-weekly edition distributed in the United Kingdom. Its offices were at Ipsıck Khau, Perchembé Bazaar, in Galata.

Bradshaw's Continental Railway, Steam Transit, and General Guide, for Travellers Through Europe stated that its circulation was "very large".

== See also ==
- Media in the Ottoman Empire
