= Muharrir =

Ottoman cultural magazine, 1876–1878

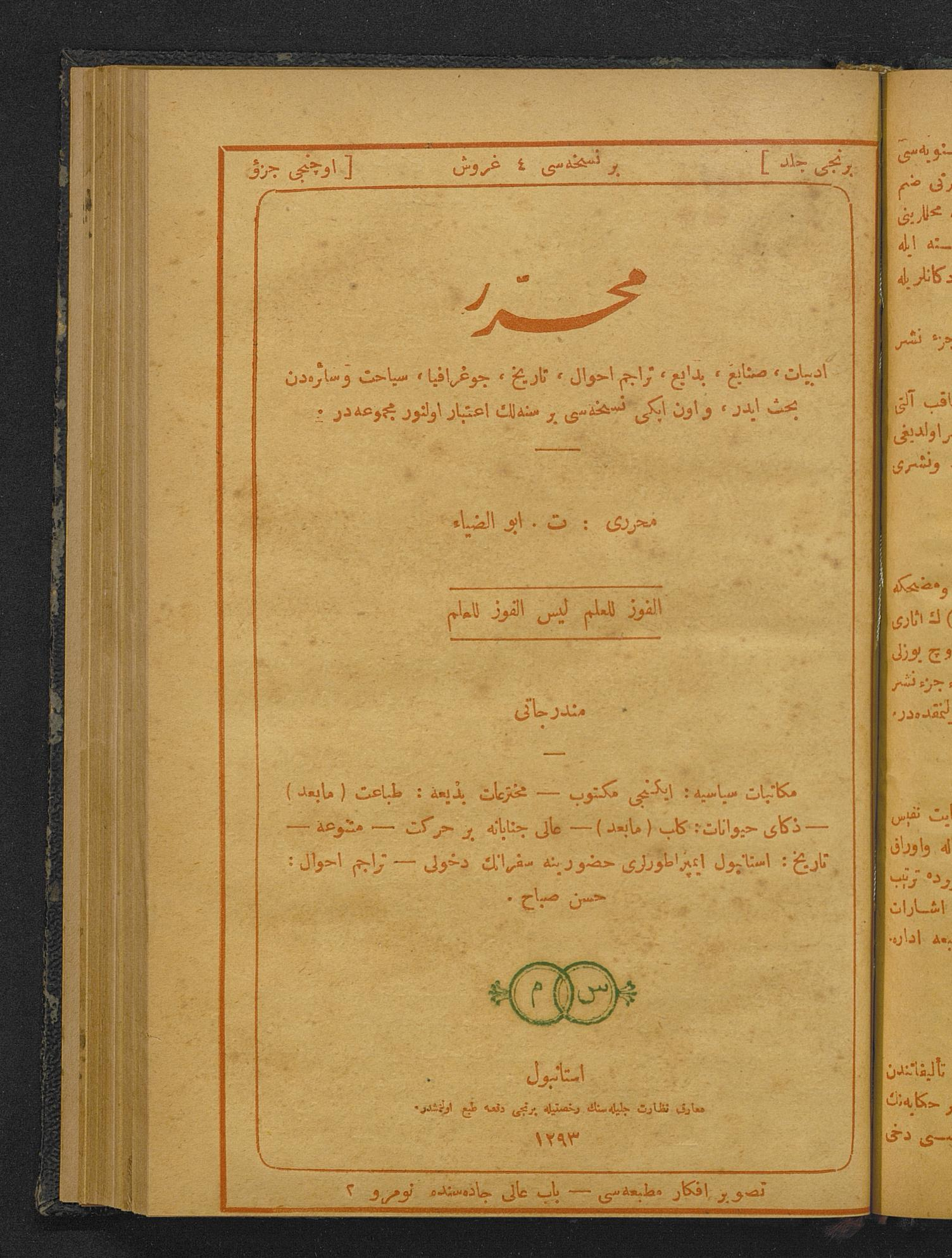
- Categories: Culture
- Publisher: Ebüzziya Tevfik
- First issue: 1876
- Final issue: 1878
- Country: Ottoman Empire
- Based in: Istanbul
- Language: Ottoman-Turkish
- Website: Muḥarrir

The Ottoman journal Muharrir (Ottoman-Turkish: محرر; DMG: Muḥarrir; English: "Author") was published in Istanbul in 8 issues from 1876 to 1878. The editor was Ebüzziya Tevfik (1849-1913), a member of the Young Ottomans (a predecessor movement of Young Turks) to which also the journalists and authors İbrahim Şinasi, Namık Kemal and Ziya Pasha belonged. Ebüzziya published other political newspapers İbret (1872), Hadika (1872) and Sirac (1873) as well as literary journals, including Cüzdan and Mecmua-i Ebüzziya (1880-1912).

Muharrir was a literary rather than a political journal. Because of his journalistic and political activities Ebüzziya fled for some years to exile to Rhodes and Konya. During this time he handed over the management of the journal to Şemsettin Sami (1850-1904). He returned to Istanbul after the death of Sultan Abdülaziz and founded a publishing house which published the products of well-known authors like Namık Kemal, Ziya Pasha, İbrahim Şinasi, Ahmet Rasim, Recaizade Ekrem and Muallim Naci.
