= Takvim-i Vekayi =

First fully Turkish-language newspaper

- Publisher: Official newspaper of the Ottoman Empire
- Founded: October 1831 (Note: État présent de l'empire ottoman provides the date of "1 Jumada al-Ula 1247".)
- Language: Turkish, Armenian, Greek, Arabic, French
- Ceased publication: 4 November 1922

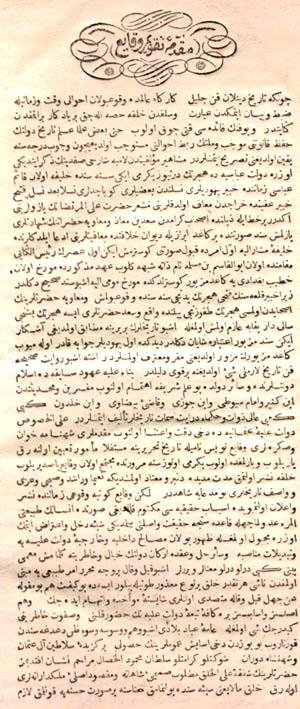
Takvim-i Vekayi, 1831, Ottoman Turkish edition

Takvîm-i Vekâyi (Ottoman Turkish: تقویم وقایع, meaning "Calendar of Events") was the first fully Turkish language newspaper. It was launched in 1831 by Sultan Mahmud II, taking over from Le Moniteur ottoman as the official gazette of the Ottoman Empire. With the beginning of the Tanzimat reform period, Takvim-i Vekayi produced versions in multiple language editions. It ceased publication in 1878, resuming in 1891–2, before being closed again. It resumed in 1908 until around 1922. Between 1831 and 1878, it published a total of 2119 issues – an average of slightly less than one a week.

In addition to the Ottoman Turkish, it had versions in French, Armenian, and Greek. The Greek version had a title derived from the French Moniteur Ottoman, Othōmanikos Minytōr (Οθωμανικός Μηνύτωρ). Johann Strauss, author of "A Constitution for a Multilingual Empire: Translations of the Kanun-ı Esasi and Other Official Texts into Minority Languages," stated that "some writers" stated that versions in Arabic and Persian existed.

== Early years of publication ==
The Takvim-i Vekayi was first published under Mahmud II. The first publication was in the year 1831. Mahmud II's reign was at the beginning of the Tanzimat period of reform in the Ottoman Empire. Many of the reforms of this time period were heavily influenced by relations with Europe and new European ideas being taught in schools in the Ottoman Empire. Before Mahmud II, Selim III was one of the first Sultans to establish relations with European powers. Between the years 1793-1796 he established the first embassies in London, Vienna, Berlin, and Paris. In 1807 he was overthrown by the ulama and Janissaries who did not like the French influence he was allowing. Mustafa IV followed after him.

Next Mahmud II came to power and immediately laid a foundation of power by giving positions in the ulema, scribal service, and army to supporters of his beliefs. He wanted a centralized government with more control for the ayans rather than the ulama. He reorganized the military and abolished the janissaries during The Auspicious Event. To strengthen a centralized hold on the provinces he created a postal system, more infrastructure like roads, and the Takvim-i Vekayi.

The Ottoman Empire had a French newspaper since 1796 and one from Smyrna (İzmir) since 1824 but they were only read by foreigners in the empire. The Takvim-i Vekayi was the first official Ottoman Empire news. At the start of its publication a French version was printed too. Esad Erbili was the first editor. The newspaper was mainly circulated near the capital and read by the elite but it was still very beneficial for government use.

The statesmen at the beginning of the Tanzimat reform era needed a way to centralize the empire and in a completely different way than former leaders had done. Many historians think the economic reforms of this period were a failure but the communication reforms were a success. To centralize they needed to consolidate the government's forms and records. They limited redundant forms and by publishing the Takvim-i Vekayi were able to publicize government activity and notices in one place. Other forms of new media such as year books and volumes of legal texts were published to help centralize the government.

== Circulation ==
Circulation of the Takvim-i Vekayi fluctuated in circulation depending on the time period. In the beginning stages only civil servants, elites, and business men read the paper. It was also mostly read near the capital, not in faraway provinces. Circulation only grew during the Hamidian Era due to increase in literacy.

The title of the French precursor Le Moniteur ottoman was made into the title for the Greek version, Othōmanikos Mēnytōr (Greek: Οθωμανικός Μηνύτωρ).

== Censorship during the Hamidian Era ==
Abdul Hamid II did not want any notions of liberalism, nationalism, and constitutionalism in the press. Current affairs were no longer published during his rule. The Takvim-i Vekayi was then just filled with government legal notices and encyclopedia like articles about science, math, and other academic topics.

Under Abdul Hamid II's rule censorship of the press was carried out by a considerably large group of people. The Domestic Press Directorate by 1908 contained twelve mufettis (inspectors), five mumeyyiz (assistants), and five examining clerks. They censored the newspaper, other printing establishments, and the theatre.

During Abdul Hamid II's reign one shut down of Takvim-i Vekayi's publication occurred due to what many historians think was a typesetter's error when publishing a legal act in the büstur part of the newspaper. Other publications were allowed to be run during this time but the Takvim-i Vekayi was shut down until the end of his reign in 1909. His censorship blocked revolutionary news spreading. The events in Macedonia during the Young Turks revolt traveled slowly throughout the empire due to the censorship of the press.

Even with the censorship Abdul Hamid II's other reforms regarding education caused the circulation of the newspaper to grow between 12,000 and 15,000 people, much larger than during the Tanzimat period.

== Influence on political movements ==
=== The Young Ottomans ===
The Young Ottoman movement was based on young men taught in the Office of Translation. They received a western education where they were taught European liberalism but believed in Ottoman patriotism and creating a constitutional government based on Islamic traditions. They thought that Mahmud II's rule was based too heavily on European influences. They wanted to use westernized advancements in academics but implement them in an Islamic context. They saw the Takvim-i Vekayi as an official document of the government, used just for record keeping. It inspired them however, to publish their ideals in their own privately owned newspapers.

The first privately owned Ottoman Turkish newspaper was Ceride-i Havadis (Chronicle of Events) published in 1840 that included more news and international developments than the Takvim-i Vekayi. This spurred the creation of more newspapers to help the Young Ottoman's cause. They include some of the following:

1. Tercüman-i Ahval (Interpreter of Situation) published in the 1860s
2. Tasuir-i Efkar (Illustration of Opinion) published by Ibrahim Sinasi
3. Avaz-i Millet (Voice of the People) published in the 1870s
4. Multiple newspapers was published in France by Namık Kemal in response to his disagreements with the Young Ottoman's lack of tradition and the Tanzimat's destruction of the check and balance system he thought the ulama had in place.

Namık Kemal created newspapers and pamphlets as a way to explain to his views. For example, he wrote about how he believed that European liberal ideas about fraternity and nationalism were comparable to the Islamic teachings about millet (community).

=== The Young Turks ===
The Young Turks also saw the importance of the media and of the Takvim-i Vekayi. When they rose to power they restarted the publication of the Takvim-i Vekayi and through the office of the Directorate of Legal Compilation published official legal mandates. This was done in conjunction with the printing of copies of legal certificates for government officials to have and spread throughout the empire.

== Notable content ==
- In the 1830s Mahmud II reorganized the military in the hopes of having an auxiliary force throughout the empire. They would help with provincial security and work agricultural jobs during times of peace. To gain support for this army he published his plan in the Takvim-i Vekayi. By 1836 the newspaper stated that 33 new battalions had been established.
- Under the rule of Sultan Abdul Hamid II the newspaper served as a source to make official legislation. The Decree of July 1872 defined the roles the Council of State and Council of Ministers had in the legislative process. After this point once laws were made they were printed in the newspaper. Fifteen days from the laws publication it went into effect. If the newspaper was not frequently circulated in an area, the law would be publicly announced in that province for fifteen days and then go into effect.
- During the First Constitutional period of the Ottoman Empire the Chamber of Deputies according to Article 78 of the new constitution mandated that all sittings be public or recorded for the public. Many times the Chamber of Deputies met in secret and did not disclose their sessions. The sessions that were public or closed to the public but not secret were documented and published in the Takvim-i Vekayi. The minutes of these sessions started off as short but grew in length and detail in the newspaper as they continued.
- At one point complex programs of study were published in the Takvim-i Vekayi for students at the Office of Translation to study from.
- The announcement of Cemal Jamal Efendi to the Council in August 1870 was published in the newspaper. Someone attaining a political position was frequently announced.

== End of publication ==
On November 1, 1922, the Grand National Assembly decided to end the Sultanate and the Ottoman Empire ended. After 4,891 issues between 1831 and 1922, the Takvim-i Vekayi published its last issue on November 4, 1922.

== See also ==
- Media of the Ottoman Empire
