= Hamiyet =

Ottoman magazine

Ḥamīyet
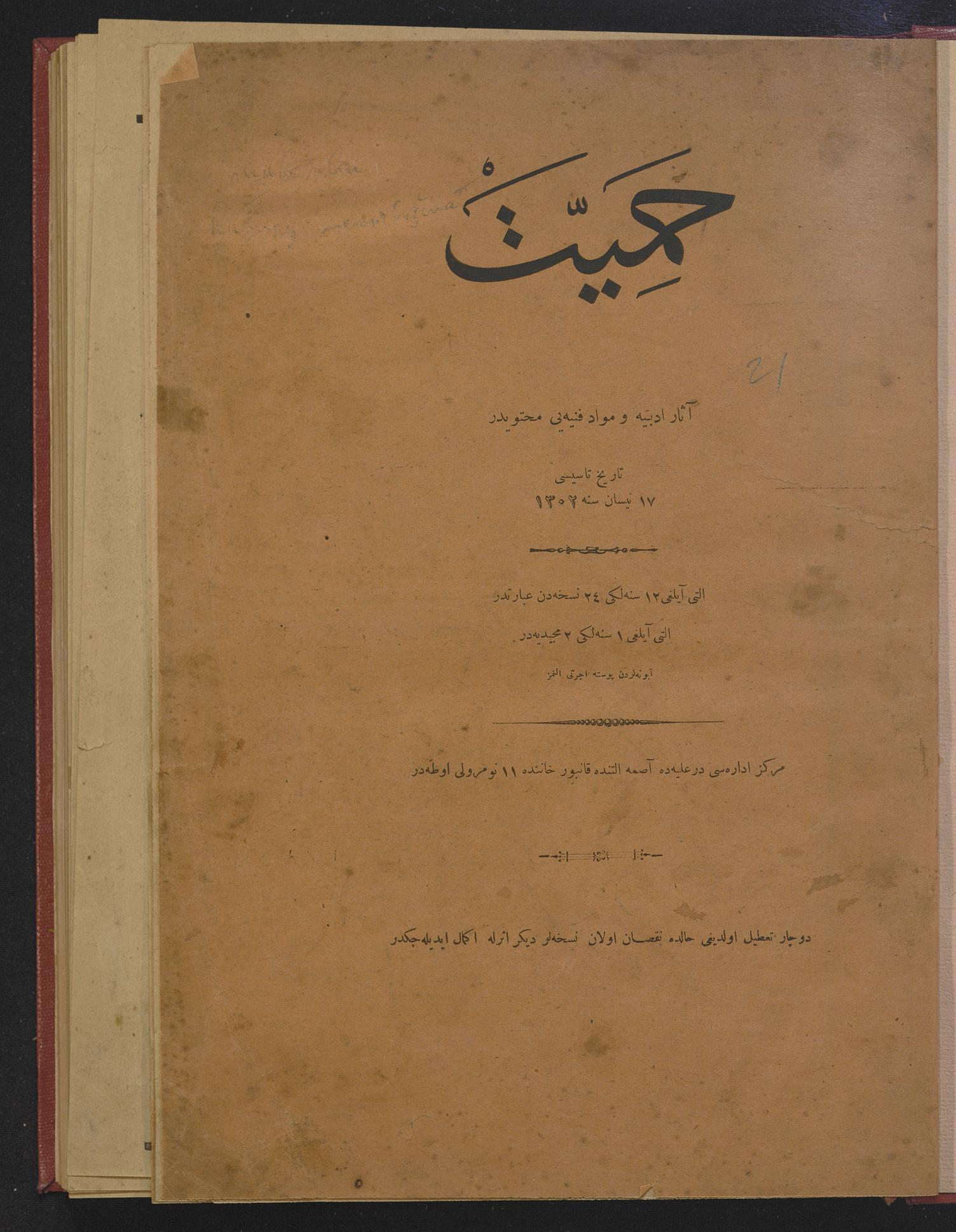
- Cover page of the first issue
- Founded: 1886
- Final issue: 1886
- Country: Ottoman Empire
- Based in: Istanbul
- Language: Ottoman Turkish
- Website: Ḥamīyet

The Ottoman Turkish magazine Hamiyet ("patriotism") appeared in Istanbul in 1886 with a total of 17 issues.

== See also ==
- Media of the Ottoman Empire
