= Tasvîr-i Efkâr =

Newspaper in Ottoman Empire and Turkey (1862–1925)

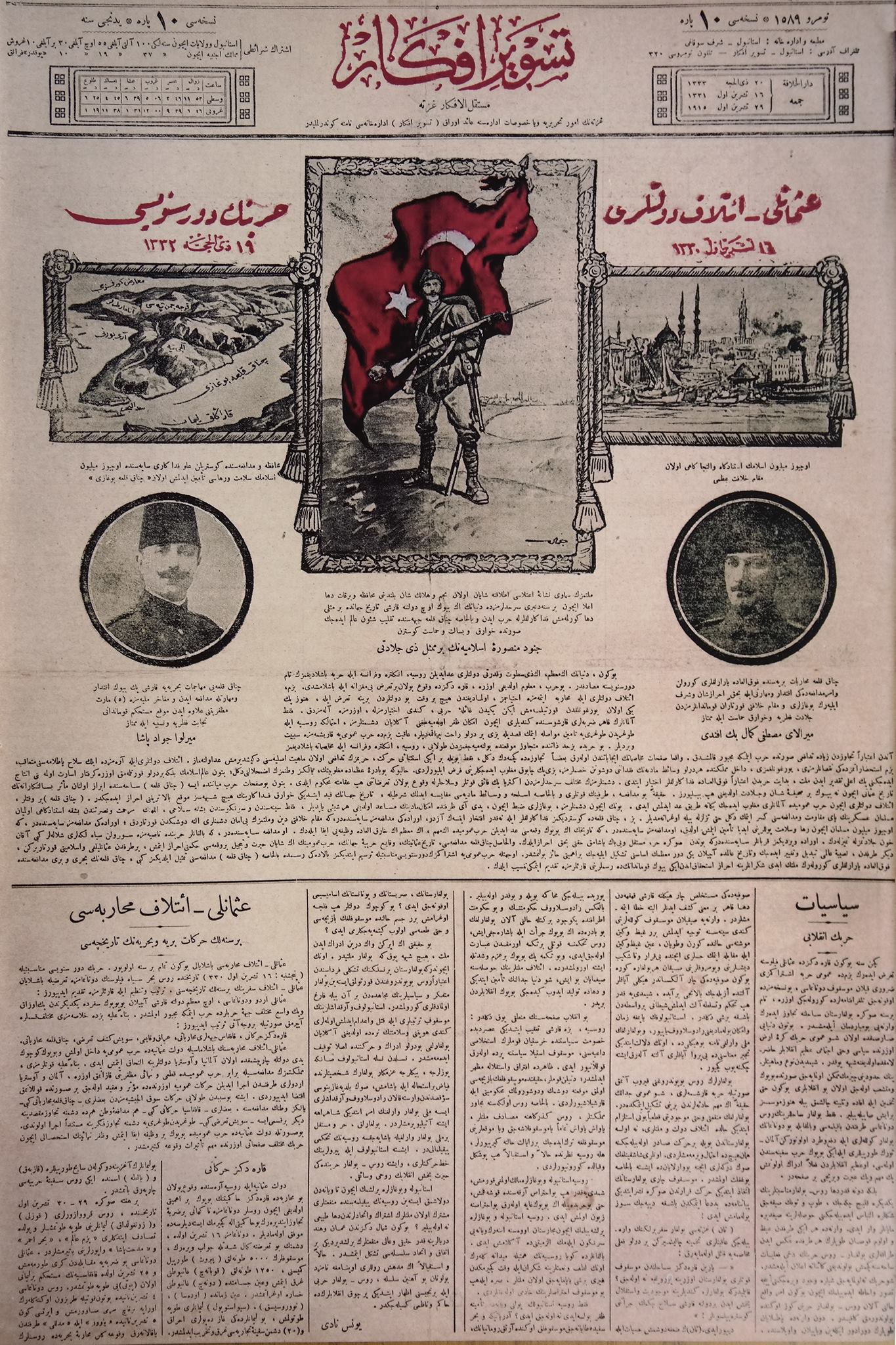
- Cover page of Tasvîr-i Efkâr dated 29 October 1915 featuring Mustafa Kemal (left) and Cevat Pasha
- Founder: İbrahim Şinasi
- Founded: 27 June 1862
- Ceased publication: 4 March 1925
- Language: Turkish
- Headquarters: Istanbul
- Country: Ottoman Empire; Turkey

Tasvîr-i Efkâr (Ottoman Turkish: تسویر افکار, lit. 'Herald of Ideas') was a long term Ottoman Turkish newspaper which existed between 1862 and 1925 with some interruptions. The paper was one of the early privately owned publications in the Ottoman Empire. It is known for its founder İbrahim Şinasi and for its leading editors, including Namık Kemal and Yunus Nadi.

== History and profile ==
=== First period (1862–1868) ===
Tasvîr-i Efkâr was first published on 27 June 1862 although its license was granted on 14 May 1861. The paper came out twice per week. Its founder and chief editor was İbrahim Şinasi. In the first issue he declared the goal of the paper as expressing the voice of public. Soon after its start Tasvîr-i Efkâr enjoyed higher levels of circulation. Şinasi edited the paper until 30 January 1865 when he left the Empire for Europe. During his editorship Tasvîr-i Efkâr featured less news reports on the activities of the upper classes and the travels of Sultan Abdülaziz. Instead, it focused on news reports related to public such as fires, taxes, crop production, commercial and educational activities. During the same period Tasvîr-i Efkâr featured numerous poems by Şinasi who also published the Turkish translations of French poems.

Şinasi was replaced by Namık Kemal as editor-in-chief who expanded the coverage of Tasvîr-i Efkâr. Namık Kemal's term lasted until 1867 when he had to leave the Empire due to the increased pressure of the government on him. The paper was edited by Recaizade Mahmud Ekrem and Kayazâde Reşad until its closure in 1868. It produced 835 issues during this period.

=== Second period (1909–1925) ===
The license of the paper was sold to Ebüzziyâ Mehmed Tevfik in 1909, and it was redesigned under the title Yeni Tasvîr-i Efkâr of which the first issue appeared on 31 May 1909. Süleyman Nazif collaborated with Ebüzziyâ Mehmed Tevfik in the publication of the paper, but he left it soon. The paper was closed down many times during this period, but resumed publication under different titles. Following the death of Ebüzziyâ Mehmed Tevfik in January 1913 the paper was owned by his children, Talha and Velid Ebüzziya.

The editor of the paper under the ownership of the Ebüzziya brothers was Yunus Nadi. Its publisher was Matbaa-i Ebüzziya which was based in Nuruosmaniye district of Istanbul. The paper supported the independence movement led by Mustafa Kemal because of which it was frequently censored. Tasvîr-i Efkâr is the first Ottoman paper which published a photograph and biography of Mustafa Kemal. The paper folded immediately after the occupation of Istanbul in 1918, and its owners exiled into Malta.

Following the return of Velid Ebüzziya to Istanbul in 1921 the paper was restarted with the title Tevhîd-i Efkâr on 2 July. Because he could not get a license for its original title. The paper was published until 4 March 1925 when it was closed by the Independence Tribunal in Istanbul. The reason for its closure was its oppositional stance against the Turkish government. The court employed the Law for the Maintenance of Order, which had been put into force after the riot led by Sheikh Said, as a basis for its ban.

=== Contributors ===
Early contributors of Tasvîr-i Efkâr included Şinasi's close friends Nâmık Kemal, Ahmed Vefik Paşa and Sâmipaşazâde Suphi. In the late Ottoman period when the paper was owned by the Ebüzziya brothers notable contributors were Zekeriya Sertel, Ahmet Rasim, Cenap Şehabattin, Ruşen Eşref, Abdülhak Hamit, and Yahya Kemal.

== Spin-off ==
The paper was restarted with its original title, Tasvîr-i Efkâr, by Velid Ebüzziya and Ziyad Ebüzziya on 2 May 1940 and existed until the death of Velid Ebüzziya on 12 January 1945. It adopted a pro-Nazi approach and supported Turkey's entry into World War II. Then, Ziyad Ebüzziya and Cihad Baban continued to publish it under the title Tasvir which folded in 1949.
