= History of newspaper publishing in the Middle East =

The history of newspaper publishing in the Middle East encompasses

- the history of newspaper publishing in the Arab world
- the history of newspaper publishing in Iran
