= Khalil al-Khuri =

- خليل الخوري
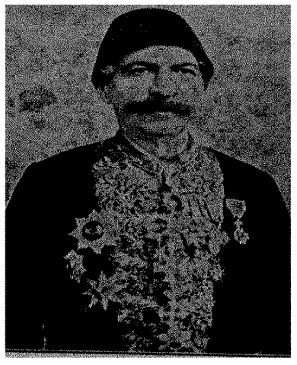
- Born: October 28, 1836; Choueifat, Mount Lebanon Emirate
- Died: October 26, 1907 (aged 70)
- Citizenship: Ottoman
- Occupation: newspaper owner

Khalīl al-Khūrī (Arabic: خليل الخوري; 28 October 1836, Choueifat — 26 October 1907) was a Lebanese writer and central figure of the Nahda. He was the owner of Hadiqat al-Akhbar ('The News Garden', 1858–1911), the first Arabic newspaper in Beirut, the origins of which may be pinpointed to a group of Syrians assembled at the forgotten Médawar Literary Circle. Quoting Jens Hanssen and Hicham Safieddine, he "was the first to popularize a sense of Syrian identity."

In the words of Basiliyus Bawardi, he "believed that an adoption of a new Western literary genre into the traditional Arabic literary tradition would provide the Arab culture with tools for reviving the Arabic language and create new styles of expression." Hadiqat al-Akhbar "was the first Arabic newspaper to publish translations from Western narrative fiction, especially from the French Romance stories." Khuri also published a fictional narrative of his own, Wayy, Idhan Lastu bi-Ifranji ('Alas, I Am Not a Foreigner'), in Hadiqat al-Akhbar (1859–61). The literary activity of the newspaper "played a substantial role in changing the aesthetic literary taste, and paved the way for the birth of an authentic Arabic narrative fiction."

== Bibliography ==
- Bawardi, Basiliyus (2008). "First Steps in Writing Arabic Narrative Fiction". Die Welt des Islams. 48 (2). doi:10.1163/157006008X335921.
- Edwards, Anthony (2020). "Serializing protestantism: the missionary Miscellany and the Arabic press in 1850s Beirut". British Journal of Middle Eastern Studies. 49: 86–103. doi:10.1080/13530194.2020.1765141. S2CID 219498842.
- Hanssen, Jens; Safieddine, Hicham (2019). "Butrus al-Bustani: From Protestant Convert to Ottoman Patriot and Arab Reformer". The Clarion of Syria: A Patriot's Call against the Civil War of 1860.
- Ṭarrāzī, Fīlīb dī (1913). Tārīkh al-Ṣiḥāfah al-ʻArabīyah تاريخ الصحافة العربية (in Arabic). Vol. 1. Al-Maṭbaʻah al-Adabīyah. OCLC 31793402.
