= Celal Esat Arseven =

Turkish painter, writer and politician

- Born: 1875; Istanbul, Ottoman Empire
- Died: November 13, 1971 (aged 95); Istanbul, Turkey
- Occupations: Painter, Writer

Celal Esat Arseven (1875 – 13 November 1971) was a Turkish painter, writer and politician. He made contributions to various fields, including photography, literary art history, theater, cinema, architecture and urbanism. He was one of the first to introduce the scholastic disciplines of history of art and architecture and urbanism to Turkey. He pioneered a unique "Turkish art" and pioneered the acceptance of the Turkish art concept. His 5-volume Art Encyclopedia is his most recognizable work.

== Early life ==
Arseven was born in Istanbul in 1875, the son of Ahmed Esad Pasha (father) from the Grand vizier of Sultan Abdülaziz period and Fatma Suzidil (mother). His father died when he was young. His primary education started in Beşiktaş Taşmaktep. Beginning in 1888, he studied at Hamidiye Mektebi, Galatasaray Mekteb-i Sultânisi and Besiktas Military Rushdiyesi. In 1889, he entered the Faculty of Political Sciences and graduated while still studying in high school. In 1894, he graduated from the Military Academy as an infantry officer. During his studies, he took watercolor lessons from Hoca Ali Riza Beyden and Zonaro.

== Career ==
In 1908, with his friend Selah Cimcoz, Arseven released a comic magazine called Kalem. In the same year, he was sent to Europe by the Ministry of War to expose the works of Turkish painters and to give concerts with the Mabeyn orchestra. In 1910 he wrote the play "Selim-i Salis" with Selah Cimcoz. The play, which received great interest, was published in 1958 as "Selim III" and was staged at the State Theater. In 1917 he wrote and directed Koruyan ölu and in 1918 he wrote Alemdar Mustafa Paşa (play).

During World War I, he was at Kadıköy Municipality Branch Directorate, and then organized exhibition arrangements for artists in Europe. Also during World War I, while in Germany he and his friends founded a company called Transorient Film. In 1917, a contemporary adaptation of Goethe's Faust was filmed in Munich in the name of "Die Tote Wacht."

A renowned historian, researcher, and writer Ekrem Isin described Celal Esat Arseven as an inquisitive individual with adequate technical intelligence. “He was capable of expressing the collapse and transitional periods. Transition refers to the actual crisis when the masks of peoples’ faces drop and everything shows. Decadence is the period of teaching." Arseven is the creator of said eras. The artist also served as administrator of Kadikoy District in Istanbul, Turkey. He was instrumental in rebuilding the place by taking away the asymmetrical construction between the port and marketplace.

From 1921 to 1941, Arseven gave courses in architectural history and urbanism at the Fine Arts Academy. In addition to his duties at the Academy, he served at the Darülbedayi Directorate after 1923. He worked along with Hermann Jansen as an architectural consultant in Ankara between 1925 and 1927. He attended the First History Congress in 1932, and between 1933 and 1937 he served as Kadıköy Community House President. In 1942, he entered the National Assembly of Turkey as deputy for Istanbul. In 1946, he was elected as deputy for Giresun. On October 25, 1971, he received the National Award for Culture from Minister of Culture, Talat Halman.

== Death ==
He died in Istanbul on November 13, 1971, at the age of 96, and was buried at Sahrayi Cedid cemetery in Erenköy.
