= Kalem (magazine) =

Weekly satirical magazine in Ottoman Empire (1908–1911)

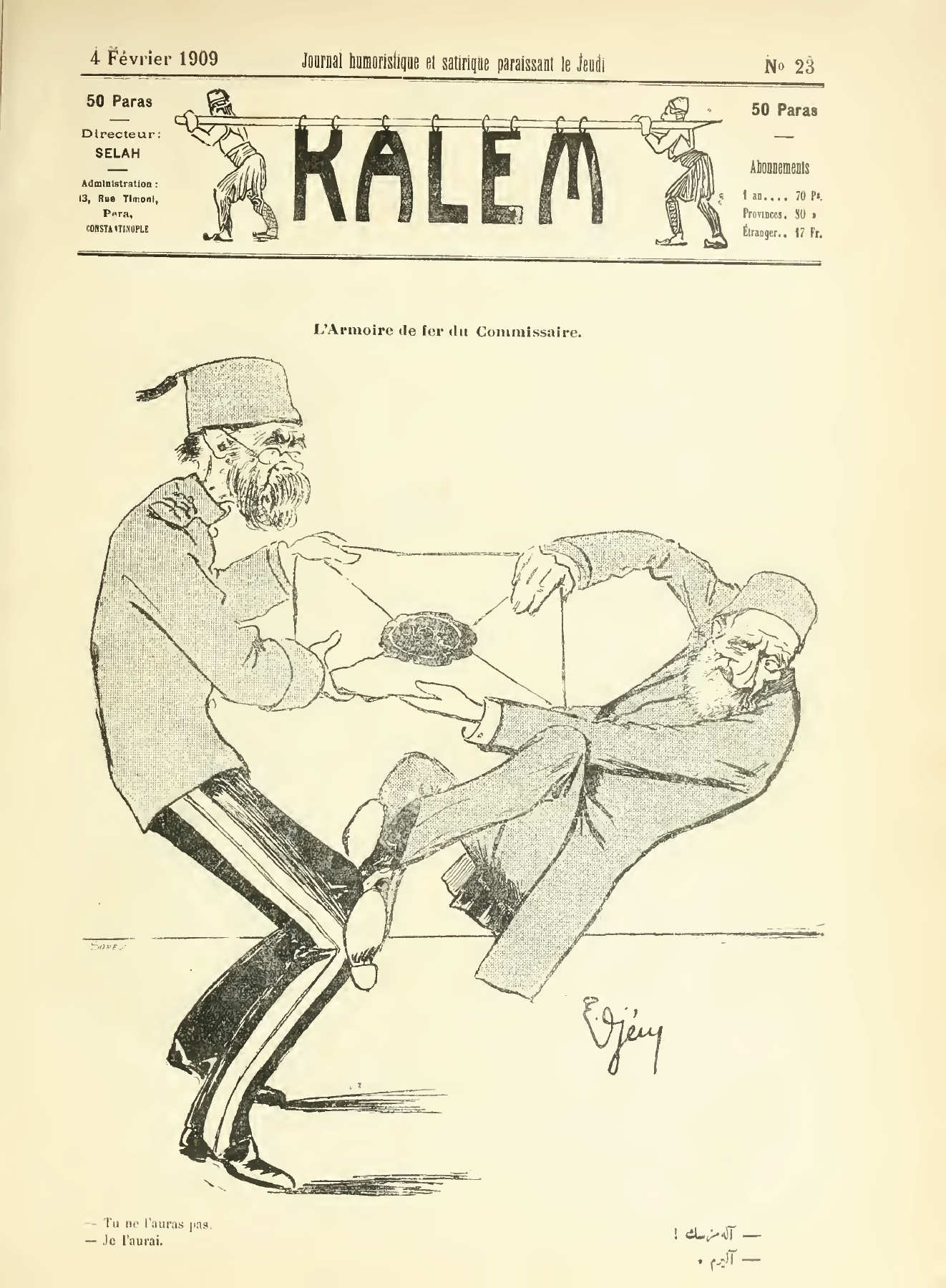
- Cover page of Kalem, issue 23 dated 4 February 1909
- Editor: Lucien Sciuto
- Categories: Satirical magazine; Political magazine
- Frequency: Weekly
- Founder: Celal Esat Arseven; Salah Cimcoz
- Founded: 1908
- First issue: September 1908
- Final issue: June 1911
- Country: Ottoman Empire
- Based in: Istanbul
- Language: Ottoman Turkish; French

Kalem (Ottoman Turkish: Pen) was a bilingual weekly political satire magazine which was in circulation in the period 1908–1911 in Istanbul, Ottoman Empire. The magazine was one of the satirical publications which were started immediately after the end of Ottoman Sultan Abdulhamid's strict rule. It was published in Turkish and French languages and was one of the most notable satirical magazines in the Empire in terms of the quality cartoons. In addition, it is the first Ottoman publication which employed the word cartoon and attempted to develop a definition for it.

== History and profile ==
Kalem was established in Istanbul in 1908 as a bilingual satirical magazine covering both Turkish and French materials, and its first issue appeared in September that year. Its founders were Salah Cimcoz and Celal Esat Arseven. Lucien Sciuto, a Salonican Jewish journalist, was the editor of the magazine which employed large number of cartoonists who produced rich cartoon styles. The magazine introduced the concept of modern cartoons in terms of lines and captions used. Because before Kalem cartoon was considered to be just painting by the journalists in the Ottoman Empire.

One of the major contributors was Cemil Cem who started his journalistic career in Kalem which targeted educated Ottomans. Another contributor was Refik Halit Karay. There were also international contributors of Kalem one of whom was Henri Yan, a French journalist. In October 1908 the magazine reported its circulation as 13,000 copies. In the same date Kalem published a caricature of German Emperor Wilhelm II who was featured as a two-faced man deceiving the Ottoman Empire. Due to this caricature the issue of the magazine was confiscated and the owner, Salah Cimcoz, was arrested for a short time upon the request of the German embassy in Istanbul. Kalem folded in June 1911.

In 2019 the University of Texas at Austin organized an exhibition on Kalem magazine and the political cartoons published in the magazine. The print editions of the magazine are archived at the university.
