= Cemil Cem =

Turkish journalist and cartoonist (1882–1950)

- Born: 1882 Istanbul, Ottoman Empire
- Died: 9 April 1950 (aged 67–68) Istanbul, Turkey
- Area: Cartoonist
- Notable works: Cem
- Collaborators: Refik Halit Karay
- Education: Galatasaray High School; Istanbul University

Cemil Cem (1882–1950) was a Turkish diplomat, cartoonist and journalist who worked for the Ottoman satirical magazine Kalem and founded his own satirical magazine Cem.

== Early life and education ==
Cemil was born in 1882 in Istanbul. He graduated from Galatasaray High School and then obtained his law degree from Darülfunun, precursor of Istanbul University, in 1903. During his diplomatic post in Europe he also received a degree in political sciences in Paris.

== Career ==
Following his graduation he held several diplomatic posts in Paris, Vienna and Rome. He published several cartoons in the Ottoman satirical magazine Kalem which was in circulation between 1908 and 1911. His cartoons contained western revolutionary ideas. Following his return to Istanbul he founded a satirical magazine entitled Cem in November 1910 which folded in 1912. His major collaborator in Cem was Refik Halit Karay.

Cemil left Istanbul for Europe in 1912 and settled there until 1921. Between 1921 and 1925 he worked as an administrator at the Fine Arts Faculty in Istanbul which was later attached to Mimar Sinan Fine Arts University. Cemil restarted his magazine Cem in 1927. The same year he was tried due to a cartoon published in the magazine. After the closure of his magazine in 1929 he became a city council member of Istanbul, but he left the post soon.

== Personal life and death ==
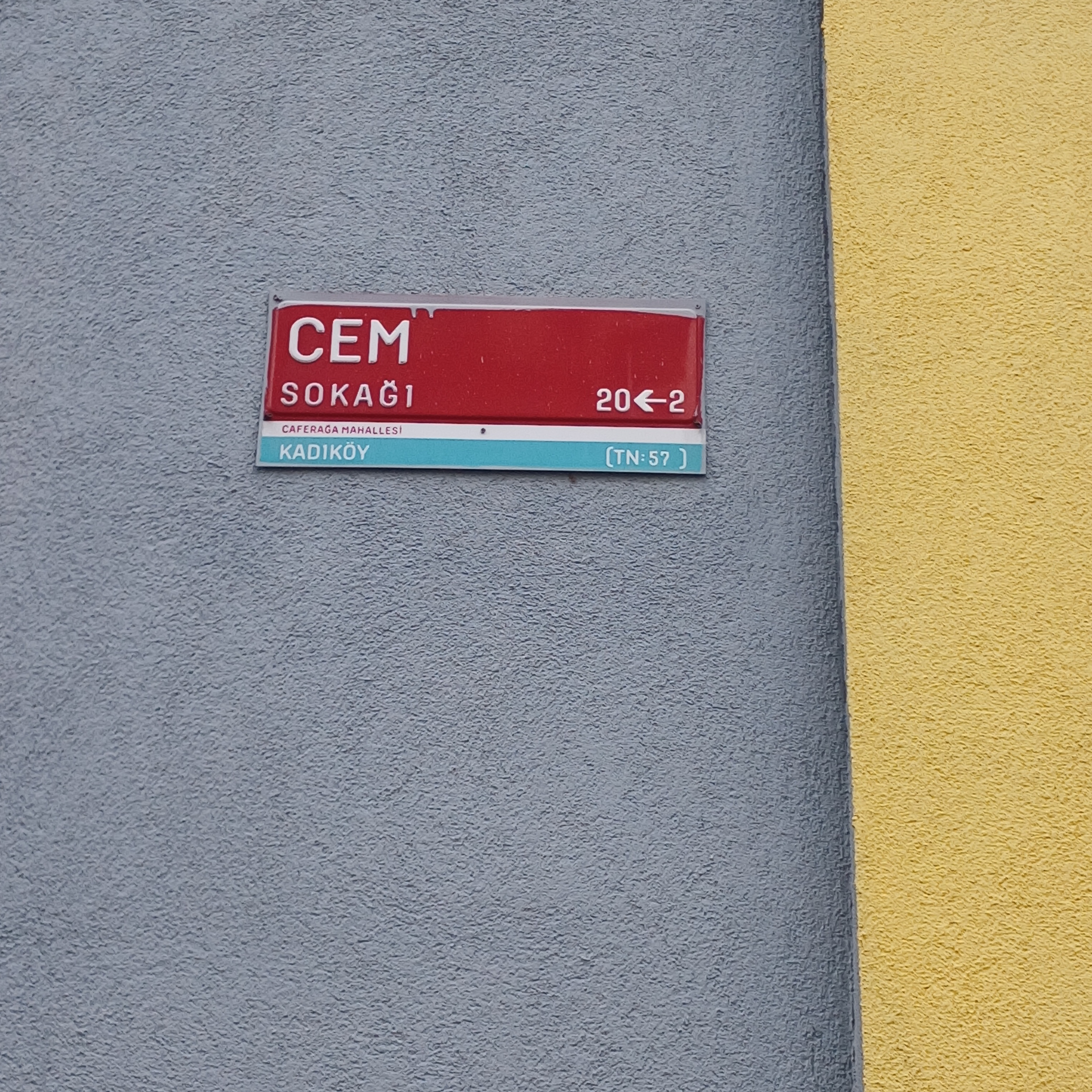
The street he lived was named after him.

Cem lived in Moda, Kadıköy, Istanbul. He died in Istanbul on 9 April 1950.

== Cemil Cem's drawings ==
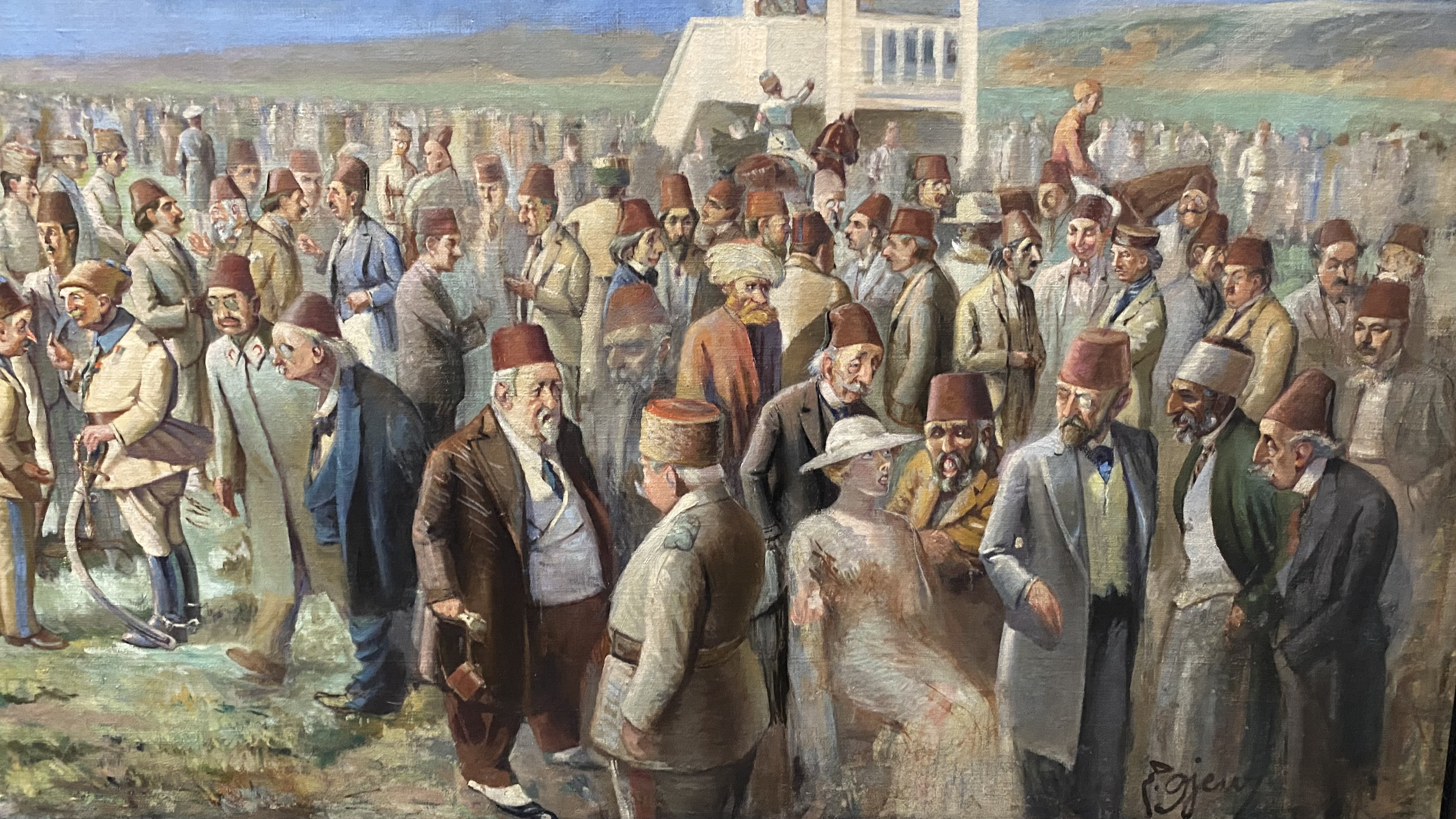
Details of Veli Efendi Meadow

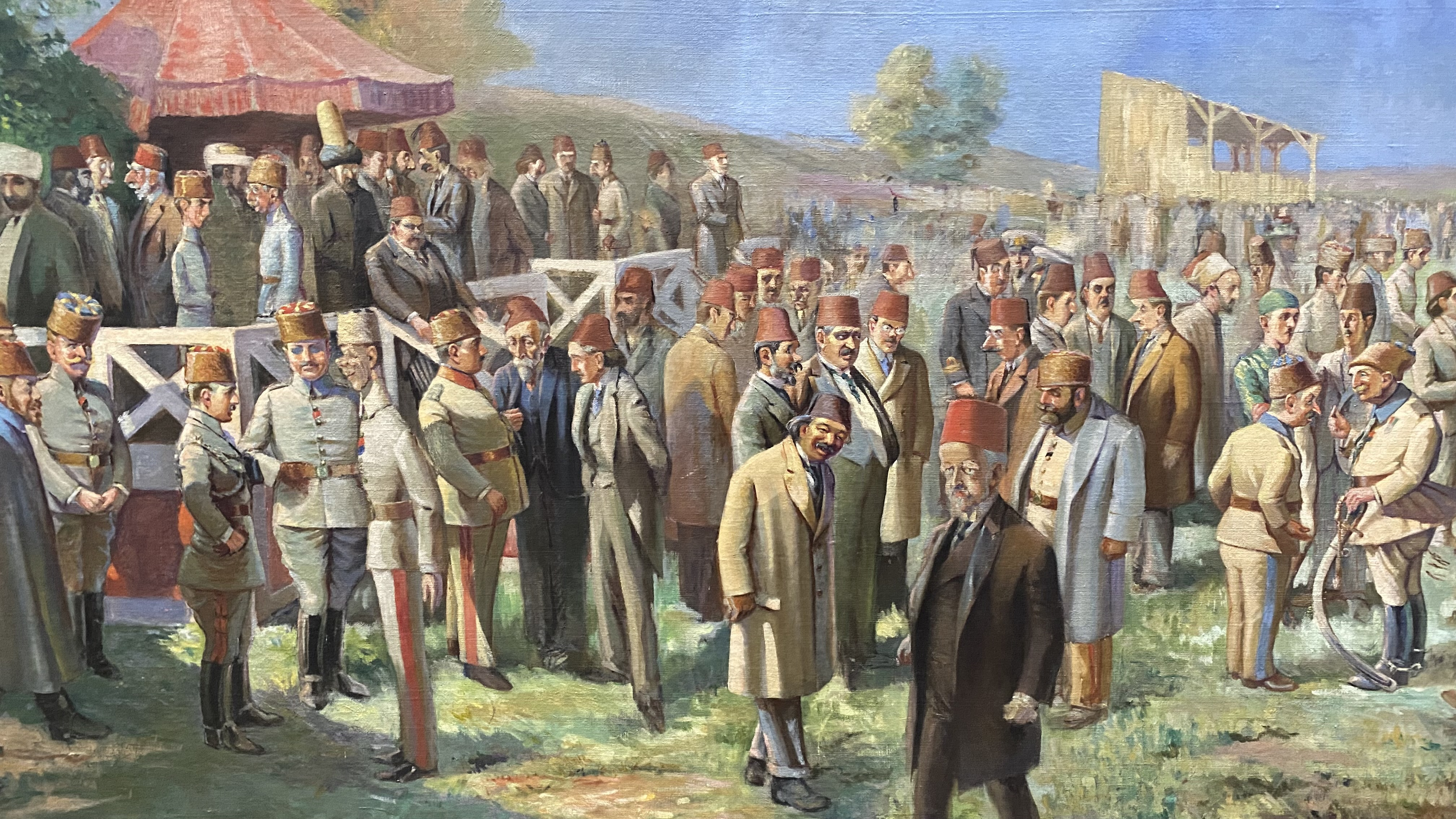
Details of Veli Efendi Meadow

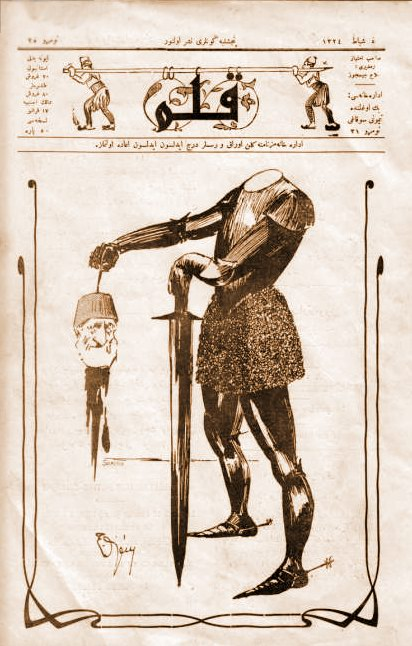
Cover page of Kalem magazine

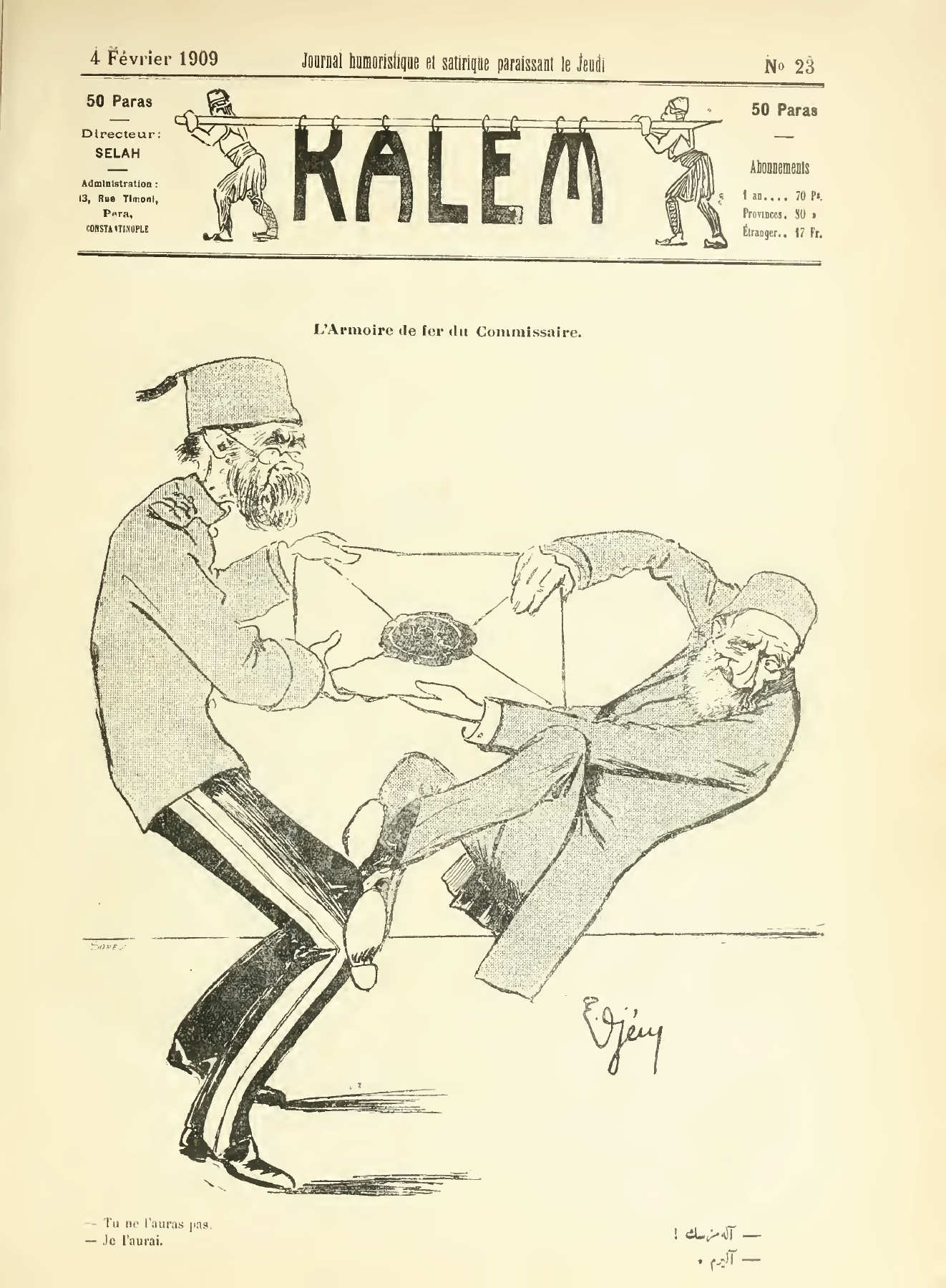
Cover page of Kalem magazine issue 23 dated 4 February 1909
