= Aydede (magazine) =

Weekly satirical magazine in Turkey (1922; 1948–1949)

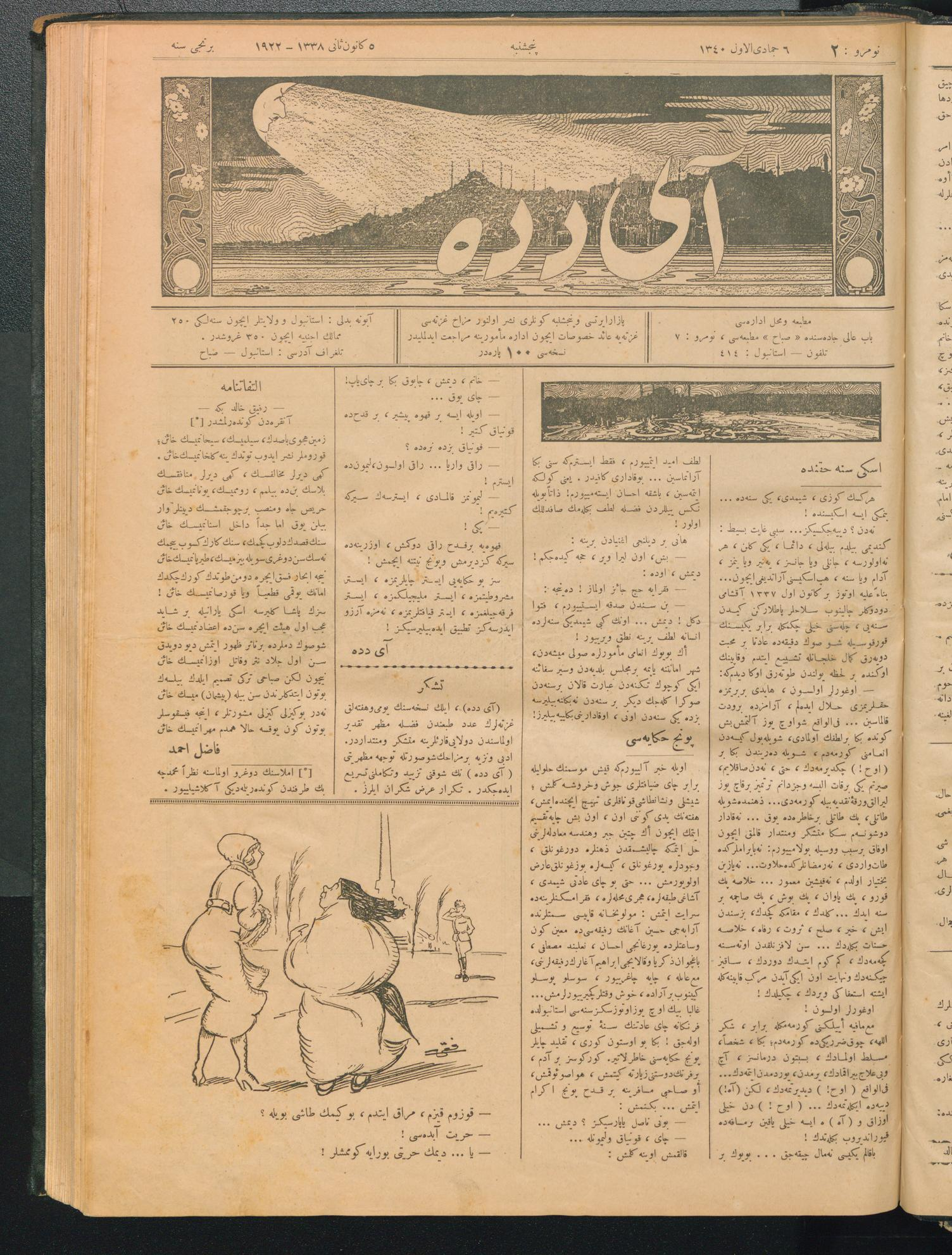
- Cover of Aydede, issue 2
- Editor: Refik Halit Karay
- Categories: Satirical magazine
- Frequency: Twice a week
- Founder: Refik Halit Karay
- Founded: 1922
- First issue: January 1922
- Final issue: 1949
- Country: Turkey
- Based in: Istanbul
- Language: Ottoman Turkish
- Website: Aydede

The Ottoman Turkish satirical magazine Aydede (Ottoman Turkish: آى دده, lit. 'Man in the Moon, Grandfather Moon') appeared in its first episode from January to November 1922 twice a week in 90 issues.

== Publication and content ==
Its founder, owner and publisher Refik Halit Karay (1888-1965), a well-known poet and journalist, criticized through the published articles, poems, and caricatures not only the social inconveniences and imbalances within the Turkish society but also the young Turkish republic in general. One of the contributors to Aydede was Ratip Tahir Burak, a well-known Turkish cartoonist. Despite the short period of its publication, the magazine influenced the satirical style of many intellectuals and subsequent satirical magazines, including Akbaba.

In 1922, the publication of the magazine was ceased when Refik Halit was forced by the Turkish Government into exile to Aleppo and Beirut. The reason was Refik Halit's overt opposition to the ongoing Turkish War of Independence. After his return, he published the magazine in 1948 and 1949 for another ten months in the second episode in 125 issues, but with little success.
