= Courrier de Smyrne =

Francophone newspaper in Turkey

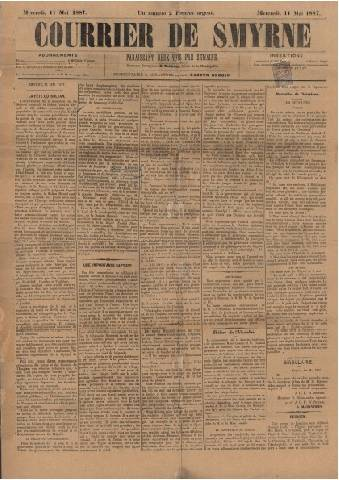

Courrier de Smyrne was Francophone newspaper of İzmir which was published from 1824 to 1905, usually twice a week. Successive editors were Alexandrer Blacque (1824), Reggio Gaston, in 1893 and Jules Regio in 1905. Besides politics, the newspaper contained commercial and literary issues, some of which can be found in the National Library of France.

== Critique on Kapodistrias ==
Courrier de Smyrne guided by Alexandre Blacque, who spent his whole life trying to stop the expansion of the Russian Empire into the Dardanelles, exercised hostile critique of Ioannis Kapodistrias, considering him representative of Russian interests and accusing him of not working for the true interest of Greece, that he wanted to become king, that he imprisoned people without cause, etc.

== Bibliography ==
- Frazee, Charles A. (1969) The Orthodox Church and Independent Greece 1821-1852, CUP Archive.
- Gilles Kraemer, 1995, Trois siècles de presse francophone dans le monde, l'Harmattan.
