= Hadiqat al-Akhbar =

Newspaper in Lebanon (1858–1911)

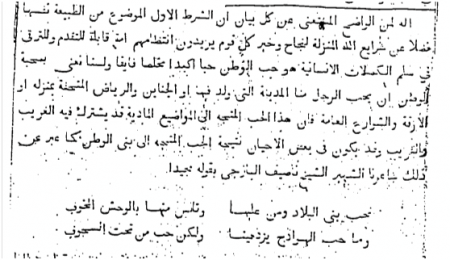
- Issue 173 of the paper dated August 1861
- Type: Weekly newspaper
- Owner: Khalil al-Khuri
- Founder: Khalil al-Khuri
- Publisher: al-Matba'a s-Suriyya
- Editor-in-chief: Khalil al-Khuri
- Founded: 29 June 1858
- Ceased publication: 10 April 1911
- Language: Arabic; French
- Headquarters: Beirut
- Country: Lebanon
- OCLC number: 213490831

Hadiqat al-Akhbar (Arabic: حديقة الأخبار / ALA-LC: Ḥadīqat al-Akhbār, lit. 'The News Garden') was a weekly newspaper which was published in Beirut in the period 1858–1911 with a two-year interruption. Its subtitle was Ṣaḥīfat Sūriyya wa-Lubnān (Arabic: Newspaper of Syria and Lebanon). The paper was the first private daily in Beirut, the first Arabic newspaper which had a regular literary section and the first weekly Arabic newspaper in the region.

== History and profile ==
Hadiqat al-Akhbar was launched by Khalil al-Khuri, a Lebanese, in Beirut. The first issue appeared on 29 June 1858. Michel Médawar who was a Greek Catholic merchant working at the French Consulate in Beirut as an interpreter financed the paper. Khalil Sarkis who would start his own title Lisan al-Hal in Beirut in 1877 worked for the paper. Its publisher was al-Matba' as-Suriyya which was owned by al-Khuri. He also edited the paper which began to be published both in Arabic and French from 1870. The French edition was entitled Hadikat-el-Akhbar. Journal de Syrie et Liban.

Hadiqat al-Akhbar was made a semi-official publication of the Ottoman Empire in 1860 upon the request of Fuad Pasha, Ottoman foreign minister, in the aftermath of the civil conflict in Mount Lebanon and Damascus. Its semi-official status continued until the official Ottoman publication Suriya was launched. Hadiqat al-Akhbar also functioned in this status between 1869 and 1870 during the governorship of Franco Pasha in Lebanon. The paper was also supported by the Egyptian Khedive Ismail Pasha, possibly after the Ottoman support ended.

The contributors of the paper and al-Khuri were members of the Médawar Literary Circle. Selim Nauphal was the editor who translated and serialized the French novels in the paper. Antonius Ameuney was the contributor of the paper based in London.

During its lifetime the frequency of Hadiqat al-Akhbar was changed from daily to weekly and then to biweekly. It featured local and international news, reports on mercantile activity and also literary works. Soon after its start the paper became one of the leading publications in Beirut. Hadiqat al-Akhbar was also distributed to other cities, including Damascus, Aleppo, Baghdad, Alexandria, Cairo, Istanbul, Paris, London and Leipzig. The number of subscribers was nearly 400 within the three months after its start. It gradually increased over time.

In 1907 Hadiqat al-Akhbar temporarily ceased publication. Its publication was restarted in April 1909, but the paper was permanently closed down on 10 April 1911.
