= Mahia Nagib =

Mahiya Najib (1926-1982), was a Yemeni women's rights activist, editor and journalist. She founded Fatat Shamsan [The Maiden of Mount Shamsan] in 1960, making her Aden's first female editor of a women's monthly magazine.

She was born in Aden.

In the 1950s, Nagib edited the women's column of the weekly newspaper al-Nahda. When she founded Fatat Shamsan, it was the first women's journal in the Arabian Peninsula. Her opening editorial emphasised the importance of women's journalism in pressing for women's rights:

Women's journalism in sister Arab countries contributed greatly in pressuring their governments to grant the woman her rights, open schools and universities for her, and provide her with the opportunity to make a living.

She was the managing editor of the woman's magazine Fatat Shansan, which published its first magazine in Aden in January 1960. She has thus been referred to as the first Yemeni woman editor of a women's magazine.

She was a leading figure of feminism in Yemen in the 1960s, and was the Yemeni delegate to several international women's conferences, such as the Afro-Asian Women's Conference in Cairo, Egypt, January 1961.
