= Cem (magazine) =

Satirical magazine in Istanbul (1910–1928)

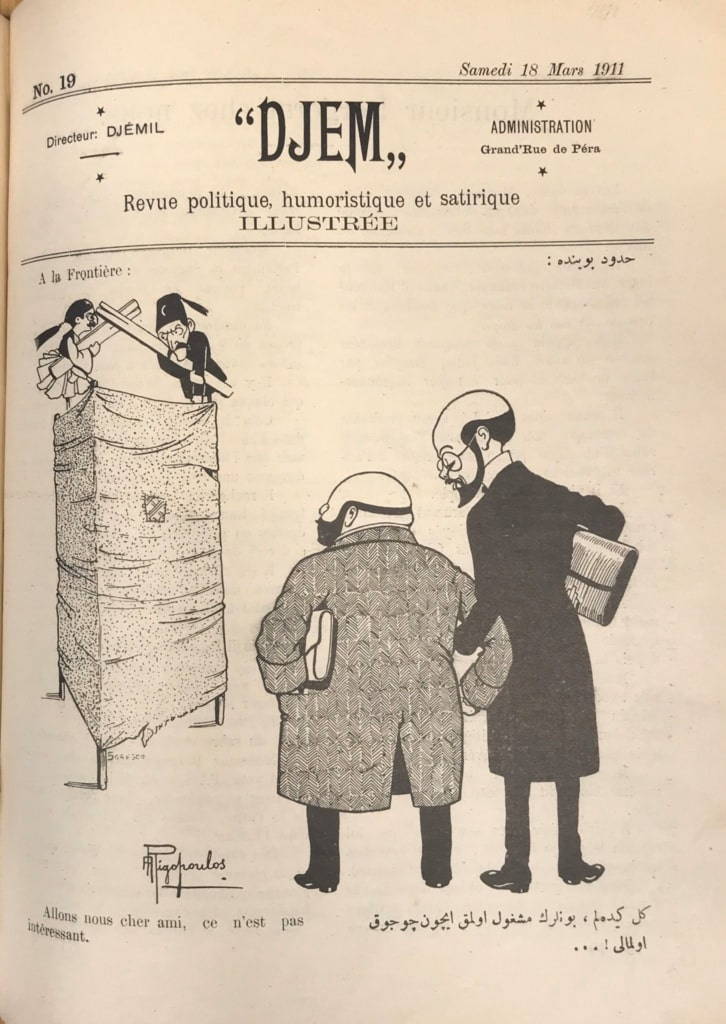
- Cem #19 (c. 1911)
- Editor-in-Chief: Refik Halit Karay
- Categories: Satirical magazine Political magazine
- Founder: Cemil Cem
- First issue: 10 November 1910
- Final issue: 2 May 1929
- Country: Ottoman Empire; Turkey
- Based in: Istanbul
- Language: Turkish
- OCLC: 42946589

Cem (Ottoman Turkish: جم; French: Djem) was a weekly political satire magazine which was first published in the Ottoman Empire and then in Turkey. It was published between 1910 and 1912 and continued its publication in the period 1927–1929. The magazine was named after its founder, Cemil Cem.

== History and profile ==
Cem was established by Cemil Cem who was a caricaturist. It was first published in November 1910. The magazine was headquartered in Istanbul and had two editions, Ottoman Turkish and French. Its subtitle was political, humoristic and satirical illustrated journal. The founding editor-in-chief was Refik Halit Karay. He also published articles in the magazine which attacked the policies of the Committee of Union and Progress. The magazine ended publication in December 1912.

Cem was restarted by Cemil Cem in 1927. The same year he was put on trial for the publication of a caricature in the magazine which folded in 1929.
