= Ebüzziya Tevfik =

Turkish politician

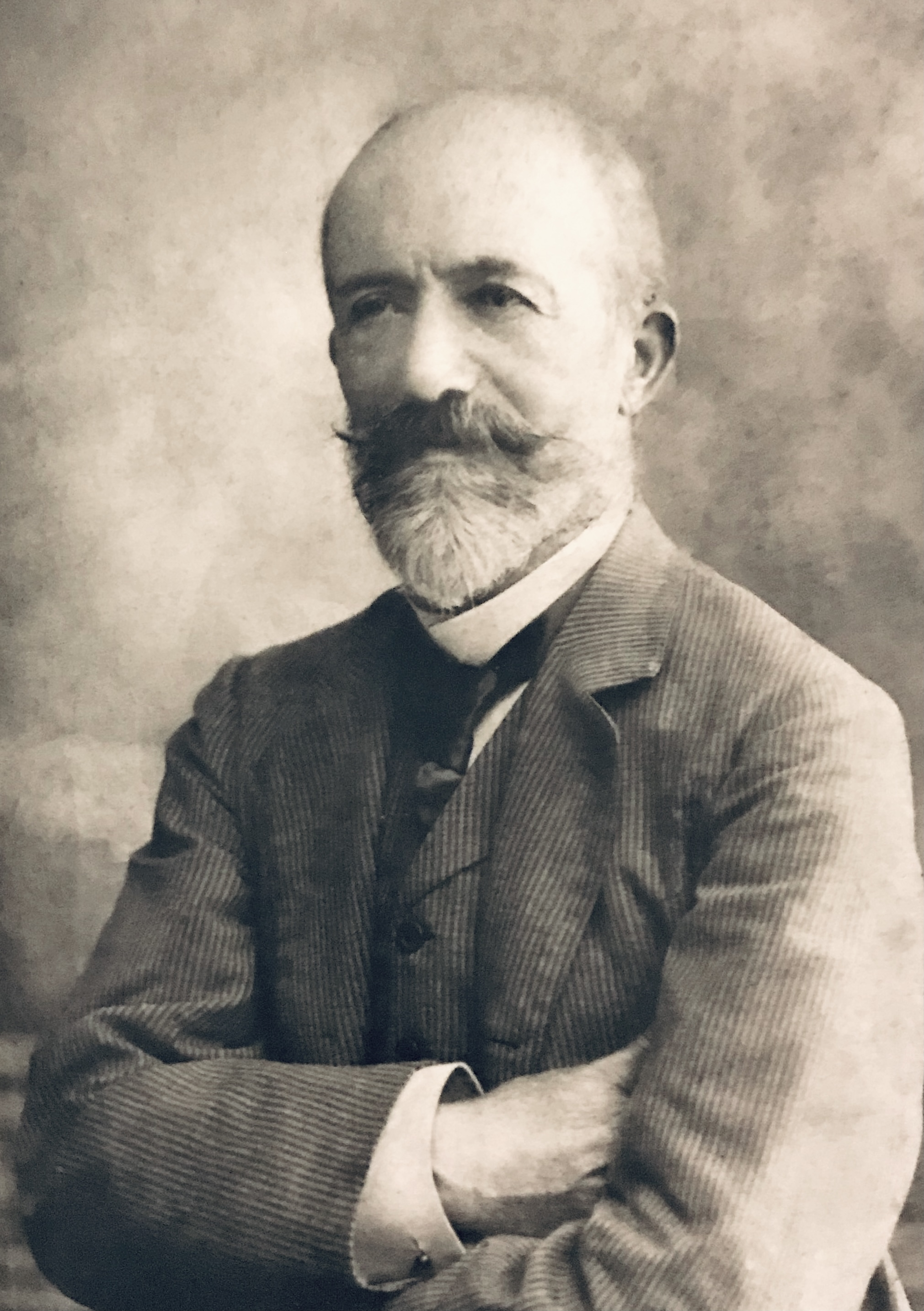

Personal details
- Born: 1849 Constantinople, Ottoman Empire
- Died: 1913 (aged 63–64) Constantinople
- Party: Committee of Union and Progress

Ebüzziya Mehmed Tevfik (1849 – 1913) was an Ottoman writer, editor, and politician, whose ideas contributed to the formation of Turkish national identity during the early decades of the Turkish Republic. An early participant in the Young Ottoman movement, he is most known today as a prolific publisher, including his own works and, through his press, many other intellectuals' writing. After the 1908 Young Turk Revolution, he served as representative of Antalya to the Ottoman Parliament.

== Early life and education ==
Ebüzziya Tevfik's ancestors migrated to Koçhisar, near Konya, from Khorasan in the eighteenth century. He was born in Constantinople in 1849, where his father, Hasan Kamil Efendi, was a scribe in the Ottoman Ministry of Finance. He first studied at a primary school in the Sultanahmet district, but after his father's death in 1857, he was invited to work in the same financial office, holding various positions until the age of seventeen. Accordingly, he had little formal education, instead pursuing his own studies and occasionally taking classes with private tutors, among them Abdülhak Hamid and Hacı Edhem Paşazâde Kadri Bey.

== Career ==
=== Early work in journalism and the Young Ottomans ===
His growing interest in journalism, including writing for the Ruzname-i Ceride-i Havadis starting in 1864, led him to meet Namık Kemal and İbrahim Şinasi, who together introduced him to the literary circle around Şinasi's newspaper Tasvîr-i Efkâr, one of the first private periodicals in the Ottoman Empire. Soon after, he joined the Society of New Ottomans, a secret association founded in 1865 that advocated for more significant political changes than the ongoing Tanzimat reforms. Ebüzziya Tevfik claimed to be the sixth member to register, but his status in the group in the following years, when most of its leaders fled to Europe—while Ebüzziya Tevfik himself was able to remain in Constantinople—is still disputed by historians.

From 1868 to 1873, Ebüzziya Tevfik worked in journalism, serving as an editor for Terakkî (Progress), Diyojen (Diogenes), and Hayâl (Dream/Imagination), among others. One of his weekly supplements for Terakkî, titled Terakkî-i Muhadderât (The Progress of Respectable Women), is considered the first Ottoman-language periodical for a female audience.

After İbrahim Şinasi's death in 1871, his printing press for Tasvîr-i Efkâr was purchased by Mustafa Fazıl Pasha for the Young Ottomans, but it quickly passed into Ebüzziya's sole custody. This press was soon publishing Namık Kemal's popular newspaper İbret (Lesson), to which Ebüzziya contributed regularly, as well as works from other members of the Young Ottomans, including Ebüzziya's first play, Ecel-i Kazâ (Death in the Village).

After the Ottoman government prohibited the publication of İbret, Ebüzziya edited and printed several other short-term newspapers. In 1873, his participation in the staging of Namık Kemal's Vatan yahut Silistre and the associated political unrest led to his exile to Rhodes along with Ahmet Mithat Efendi.

=== Exile in Rhodes ===
While in Rhodes, Ebüzziya Tevfik befriended a local official and gained access to a library. He began corresponding with Şemseddin Sami, to whom he had left his press in Constantinople, and helped start a new publication called Muharrir. Up to this point, Ebüzziya had signed his writing "Mehmed Tevfik," but because political exiles were not allowed to publish under their own names, he began calling himself "Ebüzziya" (Father of Ziya) in reference to his eldest son, Ziya.

Ebüzziya Tevfik also wrote one of his most important pieces in exile: Numûne-i Edebiyât-i Osmâniye (Sampler of Ottoman Literature), which is considered the first Western-style anthology of Ottoman literature. The anthology includes passages of Ottoman authors from Sinan Pasha to Namık Kemal, along with short biographical introductions written by Ebüzziya himself.

With the ascension of Murad V to the throne, a general pardon order allowed Ebüzziya Tevfik to return to Constantinople and resume his publishing work directly.

=== Hamidian Era ===
As Murad V's short-lived reign came to a close in August 1876, Ebüzziya became an active participant in the dramatic political changes of the era, most notably Abdul Hamid II's constitution. In 1880, he received permission to publish a new periodical he titled Mecmua-i Ebüzziya (Journal of Ebüzziya), which soon became one of the most influential venues for Hamidian Era intellectuals. Censorship forced its closure in 1888, but Ebüzziya restarted it in 1897, before closing it permanently upon his exile to Konya in 1900.

In 1882, Ebüzziya Tevfik again took control of the Young Ottomans' former printing press and renamed it Matbaa-i Ebüzziya (Printing Press of Ebüzziya). He quickly became a dominant publisher, including a popular series of almanacs, several volumes of essays by Ebüzziya and his friends modeled on French and German encyclopedias, and influential monographs like Namık Kemal's Osmanlı Tarihi (Ottoman History, in 1888), which spurred new efforts at censorship.

In addition to becoming one of the foremost writers and editors of the time, Ebüzziya also held a number of government appointments in education and various other offices. Nevertheless, his publishing activities consistently attracted scrutiny: he was arrested multiple times, and finally was exiled to Konya in 1900, where he stayed until the 1908 Young Turk Revolution.

During this period, Ebüzziya Tevfik also worked as a calligrapher on several important buildings, including the Yıldız Mosque.

=== The Second Constitutional Period ===
With the reinstitution of the Ottoman Constitution, Ebüzziya returned to Istanbul and joined the ruling Committee of Union and Progress (Turkish: İttihad ve Terakki Cemiyeti) to serve as a parliamentary representative for Antalya. He also resumed his publishing, including new versions of İbrahim Şinasi's Tasvir-i Efkar and his own Mecmua-i Ebüzziya. His pointed commentary on the political upheaval of the period, however, again led to his arrest on multiple occasions, and as he had throughout his career, he continually changed the names of his periodicals to avoid censorship.

He died on January 27, 1913, and was buried with his family in the cemetery of Bakırköy.

== Legacy ==
In the Encyclopedia of Islam, Second Edition, historian Fevziye Abdullah that Ebüzziya Tevfik's most important legacy is "in his tireless work as a popularizer, journalist, and above all publisher and printer." His press, the Matbaa-i Ebüzziya, brought a number of influential and inventive works to the Ottoman public, along with several typographical innovations like a Kufic script.

In the Turkish-language İslâm Ansiklopedisi (Encyclopedia of Islam), Ziyad Ebüzziya writes that Ebüzziya Tevfik was both an influential literary figure of the Tanzimat Era and "a publisher known to later generations for his encyclopedic knowledge," emphasizing his lifelong commitment to education. Indeed, his encyclopedic works—the literary anthology, Numûne-i Edebiyât-i Osmâniye (Sampler of Ottoman Literature), his various almanacs, and his various popular knowledge journals—are widely regarded among historians as setting a new standard for intellectual outreach to the Ottoman public during the modern period.
