= Refik Halit Karay =

Turkish author (1889–1965)

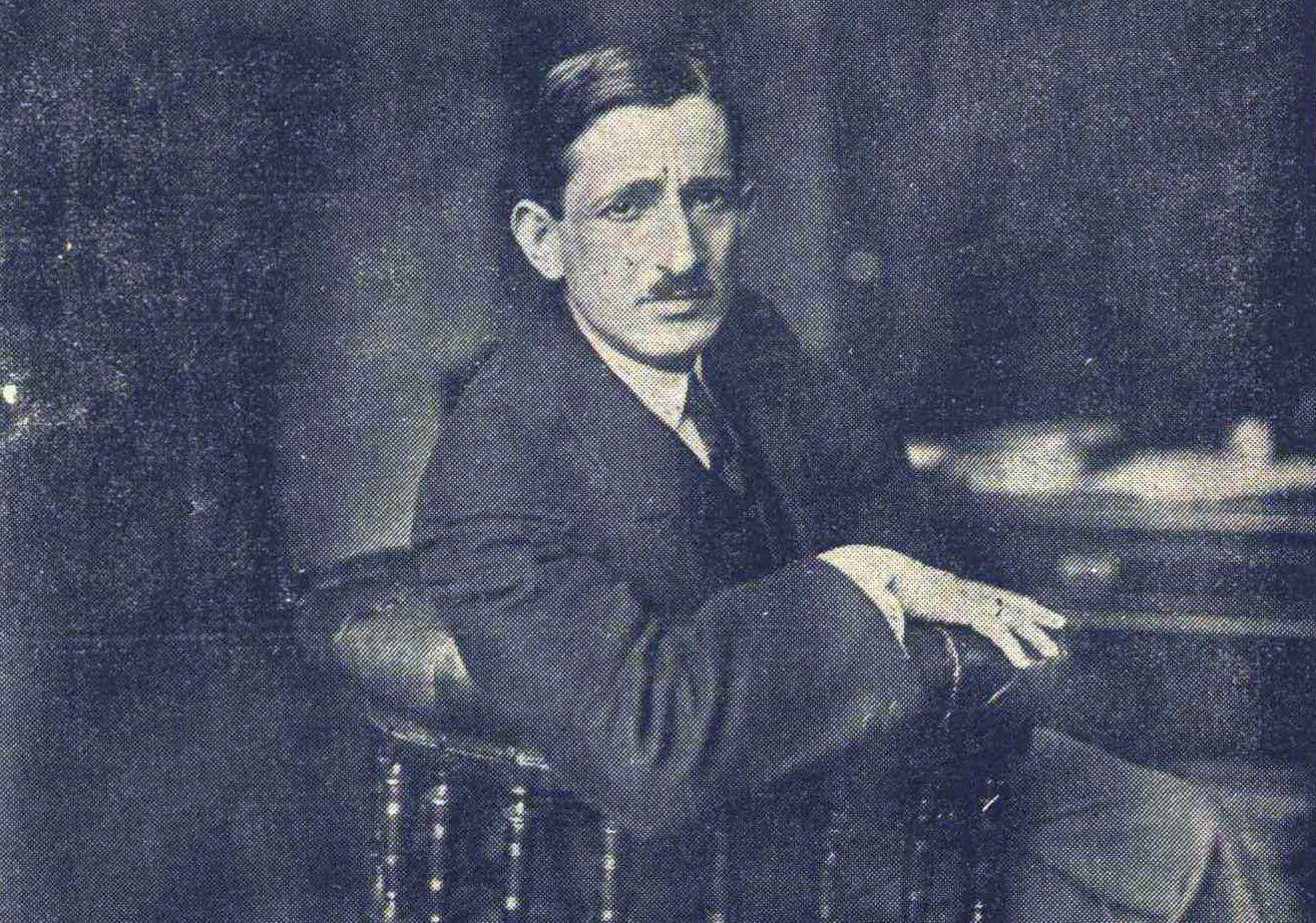
- Born: Refik Halit; 15 March 1888; Istanbul, Ottoman Empire
- Died: 18 July 1965 (aged 77); Istanbul, Turkey
- Resting place: Zincirlikuyu Cemetery, Istanbul
- Education: Law
- Alma mater: Galatasaray High School; Istanbul University Faculty of Law
- Writing career
- Genre: Novel

Refik Halit Karay (15 March 1888 – 18 July 1965) was a Turkish educator, writer and journalist.

== Biography ==
He was born in Beylerbeyi, İstanbul, on 14 March 1888. His parents were Mehmed Halid Bey and Nefise Ruhsar Hanım. After studying at Galatasaray High School and Istanbul University Faculty of Law, he briefly served in the Ministry of Finance of the Ottoman Empire.

During the Second Constitutional Era in 1908 he resigned from his post and published a short-living newspaper. He also wrote in literary periodicals.

=== Opposition to the Committee of Union and Progress ===
Karay became associated with the liberal opposition to the Committee of Union and Progress (CUP) during the Second Constitutional Era. His political journalism and satire, including writings under the pen name Kirpi ("Porcupine"), placed him among the journalists and intellectuals who opposed the increasingly dominant Unionist leadership. In 1913, following the assassination of Mahmud Shevket Pasha and the subsequent suppression of political opponents, Karay was exiled to Sinop. His place of exile was later changed to Çorum, Ankara and Bilecik, and he remained away from Istanbul until the collapse of CUP rule in 1918.

Historian Christine M. Philliou places this period within the changing meaning of the Ottoman political concept of muhalefet, encompassing both organized political opposition and dissent expressed by journalists and intellectuals outside formal parties. She interprets Karay's career as illustrating the fragmentation of the constitutionalist coalition after 1908 and the emergence of a liberal opposition to the CUP within the Ottoman political establishment.

After returning to İstanbul he wrote mainly on Anatolian life style. He was a pioneer in Anatolian based literature. He attended the Freedom and Accord Party. During the reign of the Freedom and Accord Party he served as the teacher of Literature in Robert College and then the General Director of Turkish PTT. He published a periodical named Aydede and was one of the contributors of Kalem, a political satire magazine between 1908 and 1911. In addition, he served as the editor-in-chief of another political satire magazine, Cem, between 1910 and 1912.

=== Conflict with the Turkish National Movement and second exile ===
During the Occupation of Istanbul, Karay again became politically active in the Freedom and Accord Party and served as director-general of the Ottoman Post, Telegraph and Telephone service. In the summer of 1919 he came into direct conflict with Mustafa Kemal and the developing Turkish National Movement. In what historian Philliou terms the "Telegraph Episode", Karay attempted to prevent telegrams issued by Mustafa Kemal from Samsun from being circulated through the Ottoman telegraph system and supported efforts to have him recalled and arrested. Philliou interprets the episode as a dispute not merely over policy but over the legitimacy of the emerging nationalist authority in Ankara.

Karay continued to oppose the nationalist movement through his journalism, including in his satirical periodical Aydede. After the nationalist victory in 1922 he left Istanbul and entered a second period of exile, principally in Lebanon and Syria. The new Turkish government subsequently included him among the 150 personae non gratae excluded from the general amnesty associated with the Treaty of Lausanne; members of this group were deprived of Turkish citizenship and prohibited from returning to Turkey. His years abroad also became an important literary period; experiences of exile and the Arab provinces of the former Ottoman Empire informed works including Gurbet Hikâyeleri ("Stories of Exile").

=== Return to Turkey and political legacy ===
During the later years of his exile, Karay gradually reconciled himself with the Turkish Republic. From approximately 1928, he began repositioning himself politically, including through support for Turkish claims to the disputed Hatay region. Following the 1938 amnesty of the members of the List of 150, he returned to Istanbul after approximately sixteen years abroad.

Karay subsequently sought to reconstruct his public relationship with the early Republic, revising or omitting portions of earlier writings associated with his opposition to the national movement and presenting his past in terms more compatible with Kemalist political legitimacy. His trajectory therefore did not constitute an unchanging position of opposition: at different periods he embraced, suppressed, reformulated and later returned to the identity of a muhalif.

Karay's life and writings have been interpreted as a case study in the history of muhalefet—political opposition and dissent—from the late Ottoman constitutional period through the establishment of the Republic and the emergence of multiparty politics after 1945. His career illustrates both continuities between the late Ottoman and Republican political establishments and the changing boundaries between legitimate opposition, political exclusion and accusations of treason. Karay subsequently became an emblematic figure of political dissent invoked by writers across Turkey's ideological spectrum.

He died on 18 July 1965. He was buried at Zincirlikuyu Cemetery in Istanbul.

== Works ==
=== Novels ===
The following are his novels

- 1920 İstanbul’ın İçyüzü (Lowdown of İstanbul)
- 1939 Yezidin Kızı (Daughter of Yezid)
- 1939 Çete (Gang)
- 1941 Sürgün (Exile)
- 1947 Anahtar (Key)
- 1950 Bu Bizim Hayatımız (This is Our Life)
- 1952 Nilgün
- 1953 Yeraltında Dünya Var (World Underground)
- 1953 Dişi Örümcek (Female spider)
- 1954 Bugünün Saraylısı (Royalty of today)
- 1954 2000 Yılın Sevgilisi (Sweetheart of the year 2000)
- 1955 İki Cisimli kadın (Two character woman)
- 1955 Kadınlar Tekkesi (Khanqah of Women)
- 1956 Karlı Dağdaki Ateş (Fire in the Snowy Mountain)
- 1957 Dört Yapraklı Yonca (Four leaf clover)
- 1965 Sonuncu Kadeh (Last chalice)
- 1971 Yerini Seven Fidan (Sapling which loved its place)
- 1980 Ekmek Elden Su Gölden (Life of Ease)
- 1980 Ayın Ondördü (Fourteenth of lunar month)
- 1981 Yüzen Bahçe (Floating garden)

(The last novels were published after his death)

=== Short story and humour ===
The following are his short story books:

- 1919 Memleket Hikayeleri (Stories from the homeland)
- 1940 Gurbet Hikayeleri (Stories from foreign lands)

The following are his humour books:

- 1915: Sakın Aldanma İnanma Kanma (Never be deceived, be fooled, believe)
- 1918: Kirpinin Dedikleri (What the hedgehog says)
- 1918: Agop Paşa’nın Hatıraları (The memoirs of Agap Paşa)
- 1922 Ay Nur (Light of the Moon)
- 1922 Tanıdıklarım (Friend)
- 1925 Guguklu Saat (Cuckoo clock)
