= Naomi Sakr =

British professor, author and public speaker

- Education: MA, University of London, (1974, 1994); PhD, University of Westminster, (1999)
- Occupations: Professor of media policy, author, editor, public speaker
- Organization: University of Westminster
- Known for: author
- Notable work: Satellite Realms, Arab Television Today
- Awards: Middle Eastern Studies Book Prize (2003)

Naomi Sakr is a British professor, author and public speaker. Her background is as a journalist, editor and country analyst with The Economist. After earning a PhD from the University of Westminster in 1999, she became a Senior Lecturer there in 2004, and then a Reader in Communication in the School of Media, Arts and Design at Westminster in 2006. She became Director for the Communication and Media Research Institute's Arab Media Centre in 2007 and Professor of Media Policy at Westminster in 2009. Sakr has lived and travelled extensively in the Middle East and is married and has four children.

== Satellite Realms ==
Awarding Sakr the Middle Eastern Studies Book Prize in 2004, BRISMES called Satellite Realms: Transnational Television, Globalization and the Middle East "the best book written on Arab television."

== Arab Television Today ==
Arab Television Today discusses Arab media law and policy, the creative process, and the status of journalists, including women presenters and war reporters. Helga Towil-Souri of New York University remarked that Arab Television Today "casts a wider theoretical net" than Satellite Realms and included changes within that cultural medium during the 3rd millennium. The European Journal of Communication criticised the sheer volume of footnotes as the vice of an academic, but esteemed the work on whole as a careful assessment of the challenge of the expanding genre of Arab television journalism. Arab Media & Society said it is "a must read for anyone interested in the political economy of the Arab television industry."

== Women and Media in the Middle East ==
The Resource Center for Cyberculture Studies at the University of San Francisco defined Women and Media in the Middle East, edited by Sakr, as a collection of interesting articles that relate the new and old styles of Middle Eastern media to women in that culture. The review optimistically vests "great hope" for "positive change" from women whose empowerment is educated, developed, and organised. Valentine M. Mogahdam of the Centre for World Dialogue also touched on the anthology's theme of empowerment, but noted the political, cultural, and economic challenges still facing the women of this culture.

== Awards ==
- 2003 Middle Eastern Studies Book Prize from the British Society for Middle Eastern Studies (est. 1973)

== Published works ==
=== Books ===
==== Author ====
- Satellite Realms: Transnational Television, Globalization and the Middle East (2003, I.B. Tauris)
- Arab Television Today (2007, I.B. Tauris)

==== Editor ====
- Women and Media in the Middle East: Power Through Self-Expression (2004 I.B. Tauris)

=== Articles ===
- "Le public et les 'questions de société' sur les chaînes arabes" (2009, Editions Sindbad)
- "Fragmentation or Consolidation? Factors in the Oprah-ization of Social Talk on Multi-Channel Arab TV" (2009, Routledge)
