= Namık (disambiguation) =

Namik is a masculine given name. It may also refer to:

- Namik Glacier, situated in the Pithoragarh district of Uttarakhand state of India
- Namık Kemal Dungeon, historical building in Famagusta, Cyprus
- Namık Kemal House Museum, Tekirdağ, museum in Turkey
- Namık Kemal University, university in Tekirdağ, Turkey
- Famagusta Namık Kemal High School, school in Cyprus
- İzmir Namık Kemal Lisesi, historical high school in İzmir, Turkey
- Kızılpınar Namık Kemal, Çerkezköy, neighborhood in Çerkezköy, Tekirdağ
