= Menâpirzâde Nuri =

Georgian-Ottoman politician

Yusuf Paşazâde (Menâpirzâde) (born c. 1844, Kahramanmaraş - 16 July 1906 Istanbul) was a Georgian-Ottoman politician, musician.

He fought for the establishment of a constitutional regime in the Ottoman Empire. For this purpose, he was among the founders of the secret organization called the Young Ottomans. Other opposition intellectuals of the period, such as Namık Kemal, Ziya Pasha, and Ali Suavi, went abroad and joined them in the Hürriyet Newspaper they published. During the reign of Abdülhamit, he held important positions such as the sultan's special adviser, mabeyn clerk, and tobacco director's commissioner; He was known as the "director commissioner". His works include poems, lyrics, and several plays and compositions.

== Life ==
He was born in 1844 in Kahramanmaraş. His father was Gürcü Ağa Yusuf Pasha, who was the governor of Marash at that time, and his mother was a court lady. His father served as grand vizier for a short time during the reign of Ahmet III and died when he was still a child. His mother died seven months later.

== See also ==
- Gürcü Ağa Yusuf Paşa
- Mehmet Esat Işık
- Hasan Esat Işık
