= Ahmet Mithat =

Ottoman journalist and author (1844–1912)

Ahmet Mithat Efendi
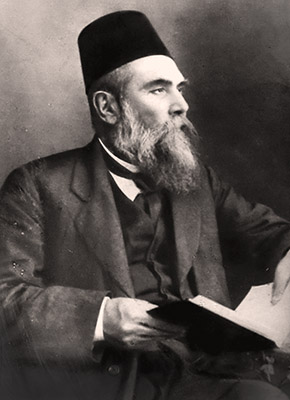
- Born: c. 1844; Istanbul, Ottoman Empire
- Died: 28 December 1912; İstanbul, Ottoman Empire
- Occupation: Author

Ahmet Mithat (c. 1844 – 28 December 1912) was an Ottoman Turkish journalist, author, translator and publisher during the Tanzimat period. In scholarship, he is typically referred to as Ahmet Mithat Efendi to distinguish him from the contemporary politician Midhat Pasha; Ahmet Mithat took on his second name "Mithat" while working for Midhat Pasha as an official and newspaper editor in the Vilayet of the Danube.

Politically, his orientation was more conservative, compared to writers such as Namık Kemal. He was a prolific writer, more than 250 of his works have survived. From 1878 he published a newspaper entitled Tercüman-ı Hakikat (Interpreter of Truth). Before that he was one of the contributors of Basiret (Insightfulness), a newspaper published between 1870 and 1879.

His editorship and publication of Olga Lebedeva's translations of Russian literature into Turkish served as an introduction of Tolstoy, Lermontov and Pushkin to Turkey's readership. In addition, he was a patron and teacher to Fatma Aliye, one of the most famous female Ottoman authors.

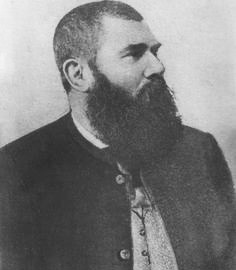
Early portrait

== Bibliography ==
=== Novels ===
- Hasan Mellâh yâhud Sır İçinde Esrar (1874)
- Dünyaya İkinci Geliş yâhut İstanbul’da Neler Olmuş (1875)
- Hüseyin Fellah (1875)
- Felâtun Bey ile Râkım Efendi (1875)
- Karı-Koca Masalı (1875)
- Paris'de Bir Türk (1876)
- Çengi (1877, oyun)
- Süleyman Musûlî (1877)
- Yeryüzünde Bir Melek (1879)
- Henüz On Yedi Yaşında (1881)
- Karnaval (1881)
- Amiral Bing (1881)
- Vah! (1882)
- Acâib-i Âlem (1882)
- Dürdâne Hanım (1882)
- Esrâr-ı Cinâyât (1884)
- Cellâd (1884)
- Volter Yirmi Yaşında (1884)
- Hayret (1885)
- Cinli Han (1885)
- Çingene (1886)
- Demir Bey yâhud İnkişâf-ı Esrâr (1887)
- Fennî Bir Roman Yâhud Amerika Doktorları (1888)
- Haydut Montari (1888)
- Arnavutlar-Solyotlar (1888)
- Gürcü Kızı yâhud İntikam (1888)
- Nedâmet mi? Heyhât (1889)
- Rikalda yâhut Amerika'da Vahşet Âlemi (1889)
- Aleksandr Stradella (1889)
- Şeytankaya Tılsımı (1889)
- Müşâhedât (1890)
- Ahmed Metin ve Şîrzât (1891)
- Bir Acîbe-i Saydiyye (1894)
- Taaffüf (1895)
- Gönüllü (1896)
- Eski Mektûblar (1897)
- Mesâil-i Muğlaka (1898)
- Altın Âşıkları (1899)
- Hikmet-i Peder (1900)
- Jön Türkler (1910)

=== Stories ===
- Kıssadan Hisse (1870)
- Letâif-i rivayat (Notes: The first Western-style story in Turkish literature.)

== Bibliography ==
- Edhem Eldem (2010), Osman Hamdi Bey Sözlüğü (in Turkish), pp. 31–34, Wikidata Q134323048
