= Namik =

Namig, Namik or Namık is a masculine given name. Notable people with the name include:

== Given name ==
- Namig Abasli (born 1997), Azerbaijani Paralympic judoka
- Namig Abbasov (1940–2024), Azerbaijani diplomat and politician
- Namig Abdullayev (born 1971), Azerbaijani wrestler
- Namik Dokle (born 1946), Albanian politician
- Namık Gedik (1911–1960), Turkish physician and politician
- Namig Guliyev (born 1974), Azerbaijani chess grandmaster
- Namig Hasanov (born 1979), Azerbaijani footballer
- Namig Islamzadeh (born 1974), Azerbaijani military officer
- Namık İsmail (1890–1935), Turkish painter
- Namık Kemal (1840–1888), Ottoman Turkish nationalist, poet, novelist, playwright, journalist, and social reformer
- Namig Mammadkarimov (born 1980), Azerbaijani futsal player
- Namig Nasrullayev (1945–2023), Azerbaijani politician
- Namık Kemal Pak (1947–2015), Turkish academician
- Namik Paul (born 1987), Indian actor
- Namik Resuli (1908–1985), Albanian linguist and academic
- Namık Kemal Şentürk (1922–2020), Turkish politician
- Namig Sevdimov (born 1981), Azerbaijani wrestler
- Namık Tan (born 1956), Turkish diplomat
- Namık Uğurlu (1976–2015), better known as Ankaralı Namık, Turkish singer
- Namık Kemal Yolga (1914–2001), Turkish diplomat and statesman, known as the Turkish Schindler
- Namık Kemal Zeybek (born 1944), Turkish politician

== Middle name ==
- Mehmed Namık Pasha (1804–1892), Ottoman statesman

== See also ==
- Namık (disambiguation)
