= Yıldız Intelligence Agency =

Intelligence agency of the Ottoman Empire

Yıldız Intelligence Agency (Turkish: Yıldız İstihbarat Teşkilatı) was founded in 1880 by the Ottoman Sultan Abdul Hamid II, two years after he took office. It was the first organized intelligence agency in Turkish history, and was named after Yıldız Palace, the palace Abdul Hamid II resided in.

== History ==
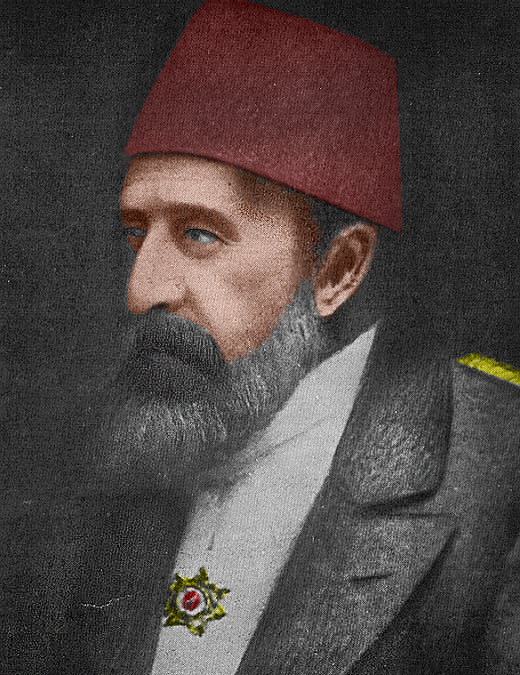
Abdul Hamid II's portrait

Internal and external incidents that developed and took place during Abdul Hamid's reign prompted him to establish an intelligence agency directly subordinate to him. An example of these scandals is when it was found out that his own Grand Vizier was working on behalf of others and against the state. As a result, the Yıldız Intelligence Agency was established. The agency is often informally referred to as being the Mossad of the Ottoman Empire.

Later on in his reign, the organization was divided into two factions; those working in favor of Abdul Hamid and those working against him. The organization was engaged in intelligence activities all around the country, especially against the Committee of Union and Progress members and the Young Turks. Alongside this, the agency was very well organized abroad. Abdul Hamid closely followed people and institutions in various centers such as Paris, New Delhi, Vienna, Rome, Dubrovnik, Geneva, Cairo, Brussels and London, among many other cities. Cities where it was found out that the Young Turks plotted against the Ottoman dynasty were of the highest importance for Abdul Hamid.

Thanks to his agents, spies and detectives, who spread over the world in a very short time, more than 3000 intelligence reports and journals were arriving to the Yıldız palace every month. The Sultan read all of these reports in person and delivered those that were in need of further investigation to his personal secretaries after he cut out the part where the signature of the spy was visible, in an effort to keep their identities a secret. He kept all of these reports.

The organization continued its operations until the abdication of Abdul Hamid II in 1908, serving him for 28 years, and making way for the creation of the Special Organization.

The intelligence agency was formed also with the aim of ensuring the continued house arrest of the deposed sultan Murad V in Çırağan Palace. This is seen in the Çırağan incident, a failed attempt unraveled by the spies of the Yıldız Intelligence Agency, whereby Ali Suavi, an Ottoman political activist and journalist tried to help the deposed Sultan escape from the palace and dethrone Abdul Hamid, reinstating Murad V as the Ottoman Sultan.

The agency burned books and shut down gazettes and newspapers which were critical of Abdul Hamid. Espionage in the country had risen to a level where those who were innocents were being punished alongside the guilty. Heavy censorship was enforced by the agency and dissenting against the Sultan was illegal and had severe repercussions. Since the membership of the agency (possibly 30,000) and how agents were trained was, and still is, unknown, there was widespread fear among the Ottoman population that they could be reported to the agency by random strangers, their neighbours or even family members. As a result of this, the people of the Empire were constantly skeptical and suspicious of each other, including state officials and ministers who refused to befriend each other.

After the collapse of the organization, hundreds of thousands of intelligence information, reports, journals, and notes were taken from the palace and burned.

In response to those who opposed using the definitions of journalism for the activities of the organization during his reign, Abdul Hamid states the following about the establishment of the institution in his memoir:

"If foreign states were able to raise people who would serve their own aspirations to the level of vizier and grand vizier, the state would not be safe. It was with this thought in mind that I decided to establish an Intelligence Agency subordinate to myself. This is the organization my enemies call spying."

== Height of infiltration ==
The spies had infiltrated to such great heights that the orders of Queen Victoria would have reached Yıldız Palace and Abdul Hamid personally by telegrams even before they had left Buckingham Palace.

== See also ==
- Yıldız Palace
- Umur-u Hafiye
- Freemasonry in Turkey
- Special Organization
