= İngiliz Said Pasha =

Ottoman statesman and Naval officer

Mehmed Said Pasha
- محمد سعيد
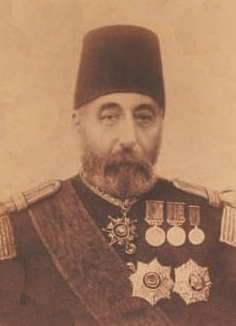
- Born: 1830; Izmit, Ottoman Empire
- Died: 21 February 1896 (aged 65–66); Constantinople, Ottoman Empire
- Spouse: Emine Güzide Hanım
- Children: Yegâne, Fatma Saide, Mediha, Memduh, and Mehmed Said
- Father: Eğinli Mustafa Agha

İngiliz Said Pasha (Ottoman Turkish: سعيد پاشا; 1830–1896), also known as Eğinli Said Pasha or Büyük Said Pasha, was an Ottoman statesman and naval officer. He served as a naval minister and as Marshal of the Palace for Sultan Abdul Hamid II. Following the Ali Suavi incident, a failed coup attempt to reinstate the former sultan Murad V to the throne, he was suspected of involvement and fell from favor. This led to his dismissal and exile to provincial governships. Said Pasha served as the governor of several vilayets such as Ankara, Kastamonu, Konya and Aleppo.

Educated in Scotland, he was proficient in English and known for his pro-British stance in foreign policy, earning him the nickname "İngiliz" (the Englishman). He often acted as a mediator when the Sultan needed British aid or wanted to reduce English opposition. He was also referred to as Eğinli Said Pasha due to his ancestral ties to Eğin region and as Büyük Said Pasha (Said Pasha the Elder/Great) to distinguish him from Grand Vizier Mehmed Said Pasha who is also known as Küçük Said Pasha (Said Pasha the Younger/Small). During his lifetime, British newspapers welcomed his appointments. As an example, The British newspaper, The Guardian had described him as a proficient English speaker, well-educated and without any involvement in corruption.

== Early life and education ==
Mehmed Said Pasha was born in Izmit, Ottoman Empire in 1830. His father was Eğinli Mustafa Agha, the governor of Izmit. He was often referred as Eğinli Said Pasha due to his ancestral roots in the Eğin region of Anatolia. His father died when he was one and a half years old. Said entered the Ottoman Imperial School of Naval Engineering in 1844 and graduated with the rank of captain in 1848. He began working as an assistant teacher under Edward Sang in the school after the graduation. He continued his studies and teaching duties there until 1854 when he enrolled in the University of Edinburgh with the wish and financial support of his future father-in-law, Marshal of the Cannon Foundry, Ahmed Fethi Pasha. His teacher, Edward accompanied him throughout his travel from Constantinople to Liverpool and onward to Edinburgh. In addition to his studies in the University of Edinburgh, he undertook practical education in various military and engineering institutions affiliated with the Royal Military Academy. Said Pasha graduated from the Department of Building and Road Engineering at the university in 1859. Upon completing his studies in United Kingdom, he returned to Constantinople in the same year.

== Career ==
=== Ottoman Naval Academy ===
Following his return to Constantinople, Said Pasha was promoted to the rank of major and assigned to a position in Ottoman Naval Academy in 1861. In the same year, he co-founded the Ottoman Scientific Society together with his close friend Münif Pasha and other associates. The society aimed to introduce western scientific advancements and culture to the Ottoman people. However, it was closed in 1867 due to financial difficulties and a lack of government support. In 1863, he was given the rank of Lieutenant colonel and sent to the Britain to supervise the manufacture of cannons and other arms ordered by the Ottoman Armoury. Said Pasha returned to the Constantinople and was promoted to the rank of Colonel in 1867. The following year, he was elevated to brigadier general and appointed as the director of Ottoman Naval Academy, where he implemented several reforms and introduced a new educational program. He was appointed to the armoury department of Ottoman Military Council in 1875.

=== Marshal of the Palace ===
Following Abdul Hamid II's accession to the Ottoman throne in 1876, the Sultan sought to form a circle of loyal pashas, while he distrusted Grand Vizier Midhat Pasha and several other ministers who had played a crucial role in the dethronement of his uncle Abdulaziz. Therefore, he offered a position in his palace to Said Pasha. Although Said Pasha first refused the offer, he was eventually convinced to take the office by the sultan, thereby becoming Abdul Hamid's first Marshal of the Palace. During this time, Said Pasha accompanied the Sultan in Friday Prayer greetings, and was his translator in meetings with foreign diplomats. Said Pasha was a member of the special commission which edited the draft of the first Ottoman Constitution submitted by Midhat Pasha. He played a significant role in the acceptance of the clause indicating that the official language of the empire is Ottoman Turkish. Following the proposal deemed appropriate, amendments are made in Articles 18 and 57. He also objected to Article 113 which granted the Sultan the right to exile anyone. Following his opposition, the Sultan modified the article adding that after a confirmed police report, the Sultan could exercise this right.

On 23 January 1877, Said Pasha was given a position in Ottoman Military School. He often criticized Midhat Pasha and Damad Mahmud Pasha due to their unwillingness to compromise on the decisions proposed during the 1876–77 Constantinople Conference. He knew that it would cause a war with the Russian Empire and make Sultan isolated. In response, Midhat Pasha and Mahmud Pasha conveyed a message to the Sultan accusing Said Pasha of being bribed by Russian Empire for his anti-war stance. However, the Sultan did not believe the allegation. When Abdul Hamid later decided to exile Midhat Pasha, he entrusted Said Pasha with carrying out this mission. Said Pasha became the Ottoman Naval minister on 26 December 1877. He was dismissed from both Naval academy and palace, but returned in 1878.

=== Ali Suavi incident and dismissal from the palace ===
The exact date when Said Pasha became acquainted with Ali Suavi remains unknown. However, they had indeed a friendship. It is mentioned in some sources that Ali Suavi used his English wife, Marie, to establish contact with certain Palace officials, and through these officials, he formed a friendship with Said Pasha. Other sources indicates that the initial contact between Ali Suavi and Said Pasha began with Sultan Abdulhamid II's establishment of the Cemiyet-i Edebiye (Literature Society). Said Pasha recommended him to the palace. Therefore, after getting acquainted with him, Suavi gained recognition also by the sultan and was appointed as the director of the Imperial College of Galatasaray.

Said Pasha entered the sultan's list of suspects and fell from favor with the Çırağan Incident organized by Ali Suavi on 20 May 1878. Ali Suavi, an opponent of Abdul Hamid and a Young Ottomans member raided the Çırağan Palace where the former Sultan Murad V was confined in an attempt to restore him back to the throne. The coup attempt was unsuccessful while Suavi was killed during the action. After the incident, an anonymous letter hostile to Abdul Hamid II published in the Ottoman bilingual newspaper, Levant Herald, brought Said Pasha into conflict with the palace. The anonymous letter addressed to the newspaper's editor, Whitaker, denounced the sultan as a usurper. Edgar Whitaker was a friend of Said Pasha. He took refuge in the British Embassy after receiving death threats against himself. He claimed that he had informed the Marshal of the Palace, Said Pasha on the publication of the letter in advance. The sultan blamed Said Pasha for failing to prevent the publication of the piece against him. Said Pasha acknowledged his friendship with the newspaper editor, but denied any involvement in approving the publication of the letter, contrary to what Whitaker claimed. However, the sultan's suspicions regarding Said Pasha deepened, leading to Said's dismissal from the palace on June 9, 1878. Although the authorship of the letter remains unknown, it is doubtful that it was actually written by an average reader of the paper; some sources instead point to Cleanthi Scalieri, the Master of the Prodoos Masonic Lodge.

=== Career as a governor and special commissioner ===
==== Governor of Ankara and Kastamonu ====
Said Pasha served as the governor of several vilayets following his dismissal from the palace. He was appointed as the governor of Ankara on 11 June 1878 and asked to leave the Constantinople within three days. He suffered from a chest illness which he attributed to the local climate in Ankara and therefore asked for a relocation. The request was approved and he was appointed as the Kastamonu governor on 10 November 1878. He visited many Armenian and Greek schools and inspected the condition of these educational institutions while serving as the governor of Kastamonu vilayet.

==== Zeitun Armenian revolt (1878-1879) ====
Said Pasha was appointed as the special commissioner to suppress the Armenian revolt in Zeitun, a kaza in the Sanjak of Marash, a sub-province of Aleppo Vilayet on 15 July 1879. The reason he was chosen for this mission was due to the dissatisfaction of the British government with the previous officers appointed by empire for the same position. Said believed that European powers sought to agitate the turmoil in Zeitun, so he practiced more lenient measures in order to prevent escalation. Said Pasha proclaimed amnesty for the rebels and implemented reforms in Zeitun. During his time in Zeitun, he wrote his observations and analysis about the area, and documented the reasons for the uprisings in his diary. British ambassador to Constantinople, Henry Layard wrote the following notes to the British foreign minister Lord Salisbury:

The Sultan (Abdul Hamid II) appointed Said Pasha as the special commissioner for suppressing the Zeitun rebellion. I think, he is the right person in terms of all aspects.

==== Governor of Aleppo ====
Said Pasha accepted the post of governor of Aleppo vilayet on 18 August 1879, though requested his dismissal due to his persisting chest illness and conflicts with Hüseyin Cemil Pasha, the Aleppo military division commander on 27 December 1879. The central government denied his several requests for the dismissal. During his tenure in Aleppo, he faced demonstrations which began due to the depreciation of Ottoman currency and the increasing of bread prices amid a grain shortage on 8 March 1880. He quelled these demonstrations successfully by distributing grain to local bakeries financed by Aleppo's administrative council and imprisoning people agitating the demonstrations. Additionally, he established a grain import company and exempted the company from import taxes for several months. Said Pasha's request for the dismissal was eventually granted and Cemal Pasha was appointed in his place on 24 January 1881.

==== Governor of Konya ====
18 March 1881, he was appointed as the governor of Konya vilayet and served in this position until 1887 when he returned to Constantinople. As the governor of Konya, Said Pasha worked to increase the province's revenues, promoted the construction of roads and railways to facilitate the easy transport of agricultural products. He strove to encourage the adoption of modern farming techniques, the transition to mechanized agriculture, and, in this context, the importation of machinery and equipment from abroad. He conducted regular inspection tours, focusing on improving schools and introducing modern educational methods in them.

== Personal life ==
Said Pasha married Emine Güzide Hanım, the daughter of Ottoman Marshal of Cannon Foundry, Ahmet Fethi Pasha in 1859. They had five children: Yegâne, Saide, Mediha, Memduh, and Mehmed Said. His eldest daughter, Mediha Hanım married Hüseyin Remzi Pasha on 20 June 1888.

== Later life and death ==
In 1887, upon returning to Constantinople, Said Pasha's mansions were placed under surveillance by the police, and reports were compiled about him. He argued that Ahmet Fethi Pasha's estate had been unfairly divided in his diary and therefore strived to secure his wife's share during his time in Constantinople. He spent the final days of his life in his mansion in Kuzguncuk. Said Pasha died on 21 February 1896. He was buried in the cemetery of the Tomb of Mahmud II in Çemberlitaş, Constantinople.

== Awards ==
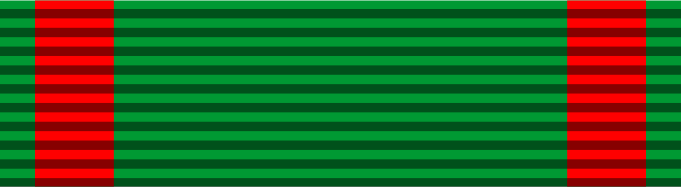
- the second class Order of Osmanieh, 1 September 1876
- the second class Order of the Medjidie, 15 October 1876
- the first class Order of the Medjidie, 3 March 1877
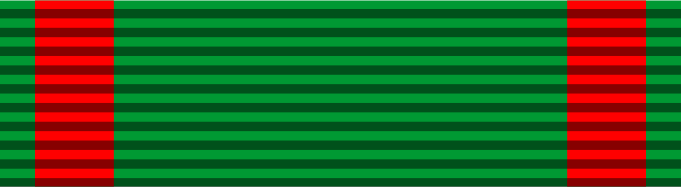
- the first class Order of Osmanieh, 11 October 1877
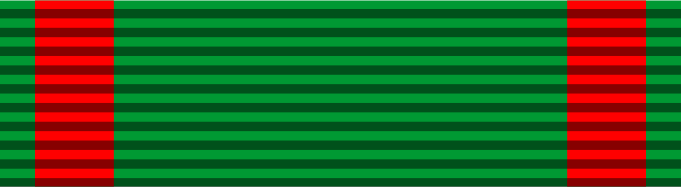
- the Murassa Order of Osmanieh, 15 May 1878
- the Murassa Order of the Medjidie, 9 February 1889

== Sources ==
- Erkan, Davut (2010). "Abdülhamid'in İlk Mabeyn Feriki Eğinli (İngiliz) Said Paşa, Hayatı ve Hatıratı". The Journal of Ottoman Studies (in Turkish). 35: 33–80.
- Çağlar, Burhan (2013). "1878–1879 Zeytun Ermeni İsyanları ve İngiliz Said Paşa'nın Aldığı Tedbirler". Ermeni Araştırmaları (in Turkish) (46): 163–198.
- Çağlar, Burhan (2021). "Turmoil in the Capital: British Publication Alarmed the Hamidian Regime". Belleten. 85 (302): 134–154.
- Sarıbal, İsmet (2018). "From Ahd-i Şehriyârî to Devr-i Hâmid-i Sânî, Adventure of a Civil Official on the Way to the Governorship in the Era of Abdulhamid II". Adam Academy Journal of Social Sciences. 8 (2): 175–212. doi:10.31679/adamakademi.454527.
- Çağlar, Burhan (2011). İngiliz Said Paşa ve günlüğü (jurnal) (in Turkish). Vol. 116. Arı Sanat Yayınevi.
- Dağlıoğlu, Sare Gülle (2022). Ali Suavi ve fıkhi görüşleri (Master's thesis) (in Turkish). İstanbul 29 Mayıs University.
- Kanat, Sedat (2018). "II. Abdülhamid döneminde Mâbeyn-i Hümâyûn'un çalışma usulleri ve kurum çalışanlarının genel özlük durumları". Cumhuriyet Üniversitesi Fen-Edebiyat Fakültesi Sosyal Bilimler Dergisi. 42 (2): 13–46.
