= Olga Lebedeva =

Russian translator, linguist and Orientalist

- Ольга Сергеевна Лебедева
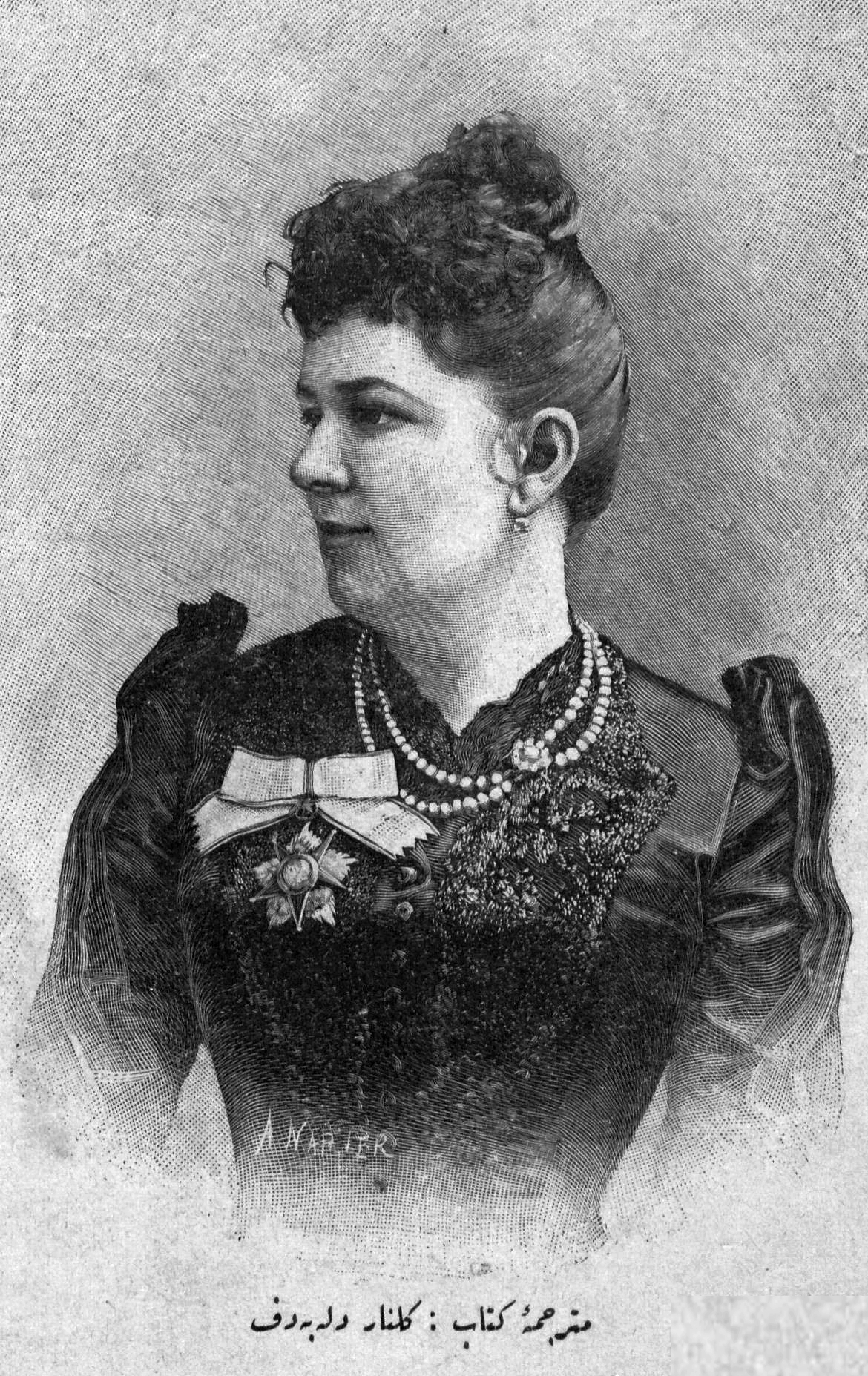
- Born: Olga Sergeevna Barshcheva; 1852; Saint-Petersburg
- Died: 193? France
- Citizenship: Russian Empire
- Spouse: Alexander Lebedev
- Writing career
- Pen name: Gülnar Hanım, Gülnar Khanum, Madame Gülnar
- Language: Russian, Ottoman Turkish

Olga Lebedeva (née Barshcheva; Russian: Ольга Сергеевна Лебедева; 1852 — 193?) was a Russian translator, linguist and Orientalist. She was a founder of the Society of Oriental Studies in St Petersburg. Writing as Madame Gülnar, Gülnar Hanım, Gülnar Lebedeva and Olga de Lebedeff, she was one of the first to introduce Russian literature to Turkey. She is recognised for her pioneering contributions to the literary networks between the Ottoman and the Russian empires at the end of the 19th century.

== Biography ==
Olga Sergeevna Barshcheva was born in an aristocratic family in the Saint-Petersburg Governorate in 1852. Evidence of her early life is fragmentary. She is said to have learned the Tatar language from the Tatar people that worked the local fields. Alexander Lebedev who was Mayor of Kazan between 1883 and 1886 and from 1899 to September 1903 was her second husband. With him, she had three children, in addition to three children from a previous marriage.

Lebedeva attended Kazan University, studying Persian, Arabic and Turkish from Kaium Nasyri, a Tatar educator, as well as attending its archaeological, ethnographic and historical societies.

In 1881, Lebedeva travelled to Istanbul. She had planned an extensive project of translating Russian works into Turkish. The Ottoman authorities, it was claimed, suspected her of espionage and forbade the publication of her translation of Pushkin. However, a set of her translations had been published in 1890 and the Ottoman Sultan Abdul Hamid II had bestowed a medal upon her, possibly belying claims of the ban. On the other hand, a letter of hers to Leo Tolstoy suggested that strict censorship necessitated a restriction in her selection of works for publication.

Lebedeva was popular in Turkey, much in demand in aristocratic circles, and appreciated for her wide learning and enthusiasm for Islamic arts and tradition. She organised literary soirees at her Istanbul hotel apartment, where the likes of Nigâr Hanım and Fatma Aliye visited.

In February 1890, Lebedeva founded the Society of Oriental Studies, of which she would become honorary President ten years later. The Tsarina Alexandra became its Patron in 1911.

Lebedeva's last known address is dated 1913 in Saint Petersburg. Her later life and death are unknown.

== Career ==
=== Literary ===
In 1886, Lebedeva translated the Qabus nama of Keikavus from Tatar into Russian. It had previously been rendered into Tatar from the Persian original by her mentor Kaium Nasyri.

In 1889, she attended the Eighth Congress of Orientalists in Stockholm, where she met Ahmet Mithat, a famous Turkish writer, publisher and the Sublime Porte's ambassador to Sweden. She travelled with him to Berlin, Cologne and Paris over a period of four weeks. From this point on, they remained in touch, resulting in a programme of publication of Russian literature in Turkey.

In 1890, Lebedeva came to Istanbul at Mithat's behest, staying for seven months. Her translations of Pushkin and Lermontov appeared in Mithat's newspaper. She also translated two works by Ataullah Bayazitov, an Imam in St Petersburg. At the same time, she prepared a textbook Anthologie orientale, where the literature of Persia, Turkey and Arabia, old and new, was transliterated, translated and explained. Lebedeva began work on translating Fatma Aliye's Nisvan-ı İslâm, a discussion of women's position in society. It appeared in 1896 in the Bibliothèque du journal ‘Orient' et ‘La Turquie'.

For her achievements in Oriental studies, Sultan Abdul Hamid II presented her with the Zişan-ı şefkat medal, Second Degree.

Lebedeva returned to Istanbul in October 1891, where her translations of Pushkin's The Blizzard and Lermontov's Demon, as well as a monograph on his life titled Şair Puşkin, were released by the Tercüman-ı Hakikat. Pushkin's Queen of Spades was next published by the publisher Alem. She also published Tolstoy's Ilyas and Family Happiness in 1892.

In 1895, Lebedeva's last Ottoman Turkish work, a magisterial introduction to Russian literature Rus Edebiyatı was published. She covered the development of the literature to the 18th century, provided sketches of nineteen authors, including Turgenev, Gogol and Tolstoy, and erudite coverage of the literary oeuvres of the great Russians. For the Turkish reading public, this was a wide-ranging and detailed introduction.

=== Oriental Studies ===
Lebedeva is thought to have attended successive Congresses of Orientalists in London, Geneva, Paris, Rome, Hamburg, Algiers and Athens between 1892 and 1912. While she was not in the official list of delegates in the first three, in Rome, she presented two reports. One was on a letter to Bogdan Khmelnitsky by the Grand Vizier Ibrahim requesting assistance from the Khan of Crimea against Poland. The other was on women's status in the Caliphate. In Hamburg, her lecture on women's rights under Islam was presented on her behalf, while in Algiers, she spoke on the conversion of Georgians to Christianity, as evidenced in an Arabic manuscript. At the Sixteenth Congress in Athens she presented About Sufism in Relation to the Partial Translation of al–Aushi's Treatise.

Lebedeva published her treatise On the Emancipation of Muslim Women in 1900, which was translated to Turkish in 1909.

=== Educational ===
Lebedeva was interested in improving the education of the Tatars. In 1893, she requested the Russian chief censor to allow her to open a Tatar school as well as a newspaper. Her request was denied.

== Selected works ==
=== History and sociology ===
- Olga de Lebedeff (1906). "De l'émancipation de la femme musulmane". Içtihat (in French). Cairo: Abdullah Cevdet Karlıdağ.
- Olga de Lebedeff (1905). Histoire de la conversion des Géorgiens au christianisme, par le patriarche Macaire d'Antioche. Traduction de l'arabe par Mme Olga de Lebedew (Speech) (in French). Casa editrice italiana.
- Olga de Lébédeff (1899). Abrégé de l'histoire de Kazan. Rome: Società editrice Dante Alighieri.

=== Literature ===
- Gülnar Lebedeva (1895). Rus Edebiyatı (in Turkish). Istanbul: Adadoryan Matbaası.

=== Translations ===
- Keikavus (1886). Кабус Намэ [Mirror of Princes]. Translated by Lebedeva, Olga. Imperial University of Kazan.
- Kar Fırtınası. Puşkin'den Tercüme [The Blizzard. Translation from Pushkin]. Translated by Dölebedeff, Gülnar Olga. Istanbul: Tercüman–ı Hakikat Matbaası. 1891.
- Lermontof'un Iblisi [Lermontov's Demon]. Translated by Dölebedeff, Gülnar Olga. Istanbul: Tercüman–ı Hakikat Matbaası. 1891.
- Bayazidof, Ataullah (1891). Islâmiyetin Maarife Taalluku ve Nazar-I Muarizinde Tebyini [The Relation of Islam to Science and the Heterodoxes]]. Translated by Dölebedeff, Gülnar Olga; Cevdet, Ahmet. Istanbul: Tercüman–ı Hakikat Matbaası.
- Tolstoy, Leo (1893). Ilyas, yâhut, Hakikat-i gına [Ilyas or Truth Wealth]. Translated by Dölebedeff, Gülnar Olga. Istanbul: Tercüman–ı Hakikat Matbaası.
- Aliye, Fatma (1896). "Nisvan-ı İslâm" [‘Les Femmes musulmanes' par Fathma Alié]. Bibliothèque du journal 'Orient' et 'La Turquie' (in French). Translated by de Lebedeff, Olga. Paris: N. Nicolaides.

== Citations ==
- Akün, Ömer Faruk (1996). "Gülnar Khanum". In Topaloğlu, Ahmet (ed.). Islâm Ansiklopedisi. Vol. XIV. Istanbul.
- Arslan, Hülya. "Kültürlerararası İletişimde örnek bir Çevimen Kimliği Olga Lebedeva" (in Turkish). Archived from the original on 2016-03-05.
- Dantsig, B. M. (1976). Blizhny vostok [Near East] (in Russian). Nauka: Nauka.
- Olcay, Türkan (2017). "Olga Lebedeva (Madame Gülnar): A Russian Orientalist and Translator Enchants the Ottomans". Slovo. 29 (2). doi:10.14324/111.0954-6839.065.
- Olcay, Türkan (2010). "Ольга Сергеевна Лебедева и ее вклад в русско-турецкие литературные связи 1". Проблемы филологии: язык и литература (in Russian). Moscow. Archived from the original on 2019-05-12.
- Shifman, A. I. (1971). Lev Tolstoy i vostok [Leo Tolstoy and the East] (in Russian). Moscow: Nauka.
