= Basiret =

Daily newspaper in the Ottoman Empire (1869–1879)

- Type: Daily newspaper
- Founder: Ali Efendi
- Editor-in-chief: Ali Efendi
- Founded: 1869
- Ceased publication: 1879
- Political alignment: Pan-Islamist; Pan-Turkism
- Language: Ottoman Turkish
- Headquarters: Constantinople
- Country: Ottoman Empire

Basiret (Ottoman Turkish: Insightfulness) was an Ottoman daily newspaper which was published in Constantinople from 1869 to 1879. It was one of the most widely read newspapers of that period and had a pan-Islamist approach.

== History and profile ==
Basiret was established by Ali Efendi, a journalist, in 1869, and the first issue appeared on 23 January 1870. He was also the publisher of the paper and began to be known as Basiretçi Ali Efendi due to the popularity of the paper. He was financed by German Chancellor Otto von Bismarck in getting printing machines to launch the paper.

Basiret sold 40,000 copies in its first year. Then it enjoyed both high levels of circulation and influence among the Turks living in the Empire. The readers of the paper were mostly conservative Muslims. Major contributors included Ali Suavi, Namık Kemal and Ahmet Mithat. Basiret covered critical articles about the bureaucratic structure of the Ottoman Empire.

Basiret had links to the Young Ottomans movement. During the Franco-Prussian War in 1870-1871 the paper supported the Germans. It became a platform for the pan-Islamist and pan-Turkist figures, shifting away from its objective approach at the beginning of the Russo-Turkish War in 1877.
