= Ali Suavi =

Ottoman journalist (1839–1878)

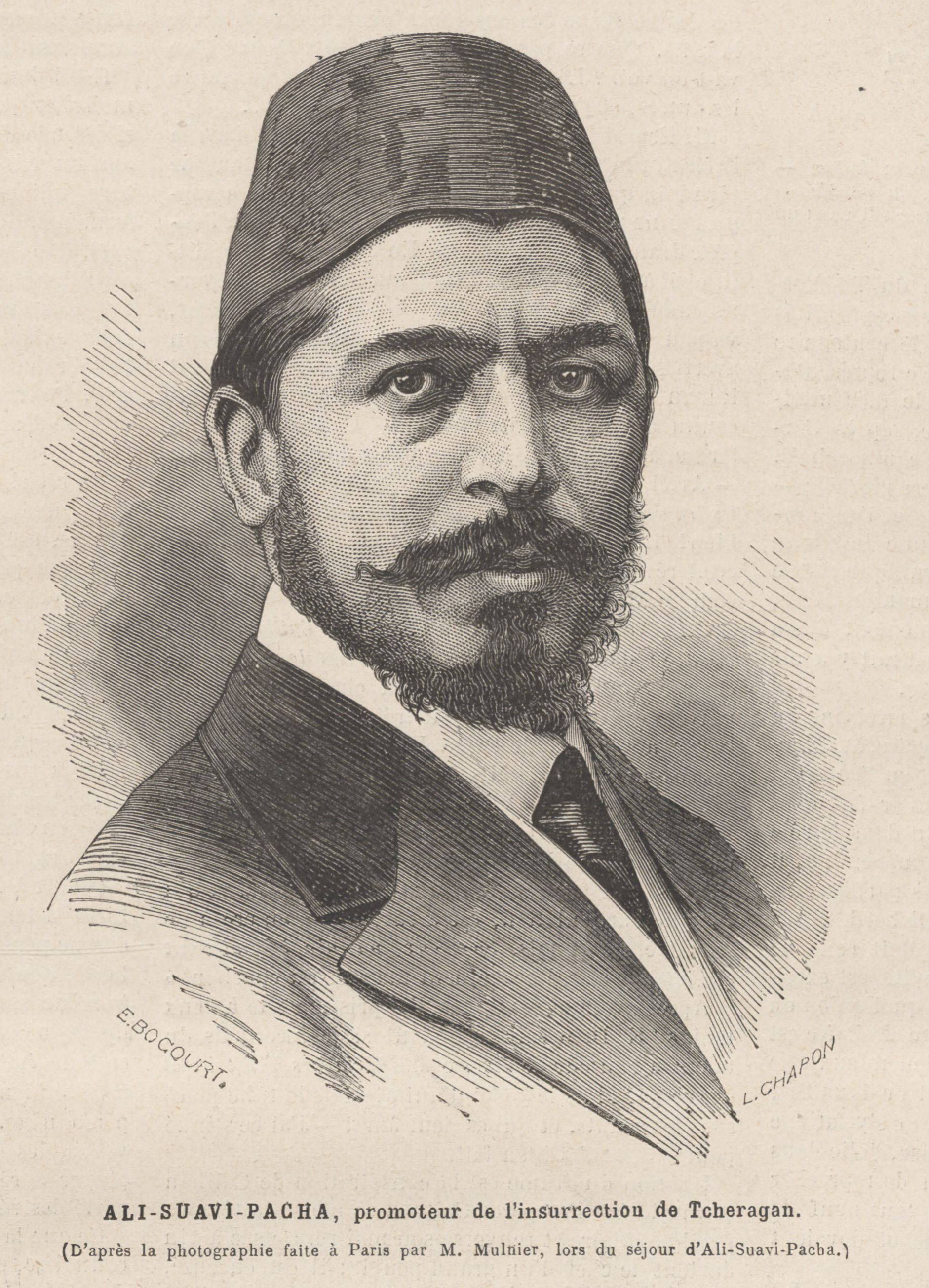
- Born: 8 December 1839; Istanbul, Ottoman Empire
- Died: 20 May 1878 (aged 38); Istanbul, Ottoman Empire
- Occupation: Educator

Ali Suavi (Ottoman Turkish: علی سعاوی; 8 December 1839 – 20 May 1878) was an Ottoman Turk political activist, journalist, educator, theologian and reformer. He was exiled to Kastamonu because of his writings against Ottoman Sultan Abdülaziz. He is one of the first Pan-Turkists in the Ottoman period.

== Biography ==
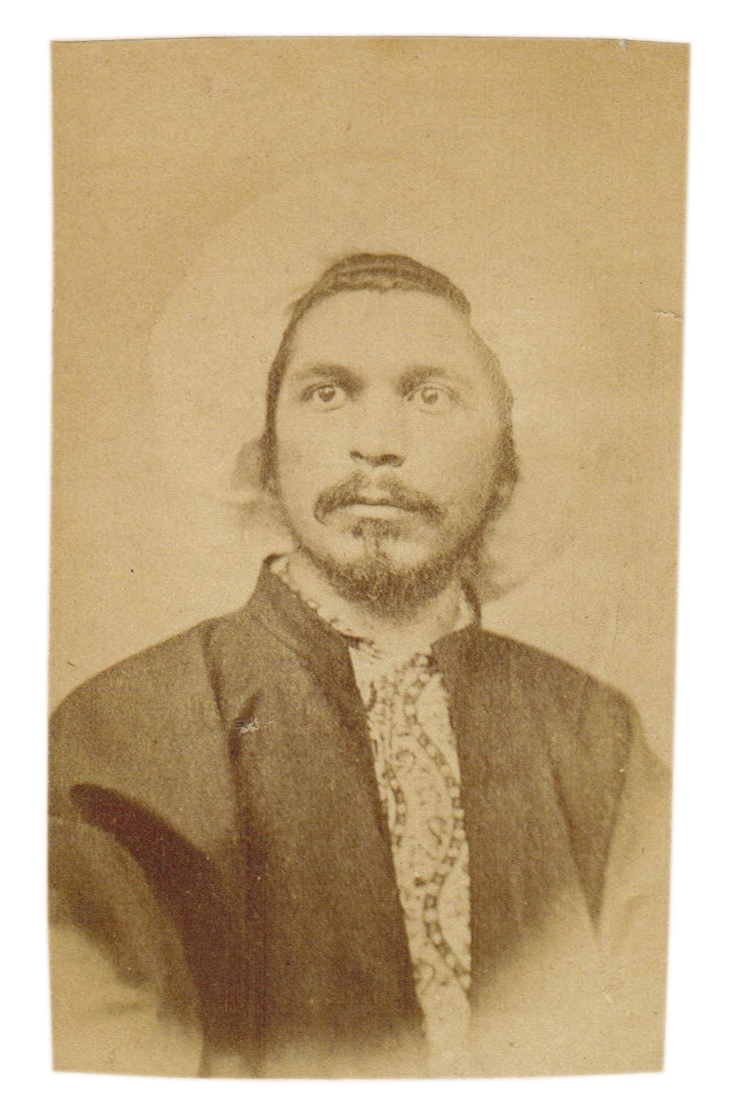
A photograph of Ali Suavi taken by Abdullah Biraderler

He taught at an elementary school in Bursa, preached at the Sehzade Mosque in Istanbul, wrote for Filip (Philip) Efendi’s newspaper Muhbir, and worked in different positions at offices in Simav, Plovdiv, and Sofia. He was a member of the Young Ottomans and editor of its official journal. He was also one of the contributors of pan-Islamist newspaper Basiret.

In 1867 he escaped prosecution by fleeing to Paris along with fellow Young Ottomans Namık Kemal and Ziya Pasha, where he stayed until Abdülaziz was dethroned in 1876. With his background in journalism, Suavi was placed in charge of the first Young Ottoman publication to appear in Europe, Muhbir. As the newspaper became "more vitriolic and fanatically Muslim in tone", which was disliked by the other Young Ottomans who preferred to focus on political goals, the latter soon requested that Suavi remove the Young Ottoman association with the publication. Suavi drifted around to various cities in Europe and grew bitter against the Young Ottomans, continuing to publish elsewhere, including a newspaper named "Ulûm Gazetesi" (Journal of Sciences) that he wrote, edited, and published himself. He lambasted both the republican Young Ottomans and the monarchist Ottoman Sultan's government alike as enemies of the people. Despite his opposition to the contemporary Sultan's government, Suavi's writings showed great respect to the institution of the Sultan, which in his belief would best be filled, for the common good of the people, by an enlightened absolutist.

Suavi was an early proponent of reforms to make the Turkish language more accessible to ordinary Turks. In calling for the active propagation of words of Turkish origin (rather than Arabic or Persian loanwords), he prefigured the radical language reform of the 1930s. According to Geoffrey Lewis, he was "one of the first to take a nationalist stand in the matter of language". Suavi also called for Turkish racial supremacy over other ethnic groups. Similarly to other Young Ottomans, he described the "Turkish race" as older than other races and thus superior to them, and emphasized deep "ties of blood" to other Turkic states like the Khanate of Khiva. On the subject of religion, although his views have been characterized as Islamist, Suavi has also been credited with formulating an early defense of laicism.

After the conservative Abdul Hamid II became sultan, Suavi attempted a coup in 1878 known as the Çırağan incident in an attempt to end the increasing authoritarianism and reinstall Murad V, who had been sympathetic to liberal ideals. The coup failed and Ali Suavi was killed in the attempt. According to İngiliz Said Pasha, moments before his death, Ali Suavi took Murad's arm and said to him, "O our Lord, come, deliver us from the Muscovites." ("Aman efendimiz, gel bizi Moskoflardan ḫalâṣ et.")

== Publications ==
- A Propos de L'Herzegovine (Regarding Herzegovina, Paris, 1876)
- Ali Paşa'nın Siyaseti (The Politics of Ali Paşa, 1908)
- Defter-i Âmâl-i Ali Paşa (Defter-i Amal-i* of Ali Paşa, Paris, ?)
- Devlet Yüz On Altı Buçuk Milyon Borçtan Kurtuluyor (The Government Gets Out of a One Hundred and *Sixteen and a Half Million Debt, Paris, 1875)
- Hive (Hive, Paris 1874, İstanbul 1910)
- Hukuku'ş-Şevari (Ways of the Law, translation from Gazali, 1808)
- Montenegro (Montenegro, Paris, 1876)
- Nesayih-i Ebu Hanife Kamusu'l Ulûm Vel Maârif (Nesayih-i Ebu Hanife, Dictionary of Science and *Education, an unfinished essay of encyclopedia, 1870)
- Saydu'l Mefkûd (The Lost Prey, 2 volumes)
- Taharriyat-ı Suavi alâ Tarih-i Türk (The Research of Suavi on Turkish History)
- Usul-i Fıkıh Nam Risalenin Tercümesi (Translation of the Pamphlet named Methodology of the Canon Law, London, 1868)
