= Palazzo del Provveditore =

Royal palace in Famagusta

Coordinates: 35.1245°N 33.9410°E

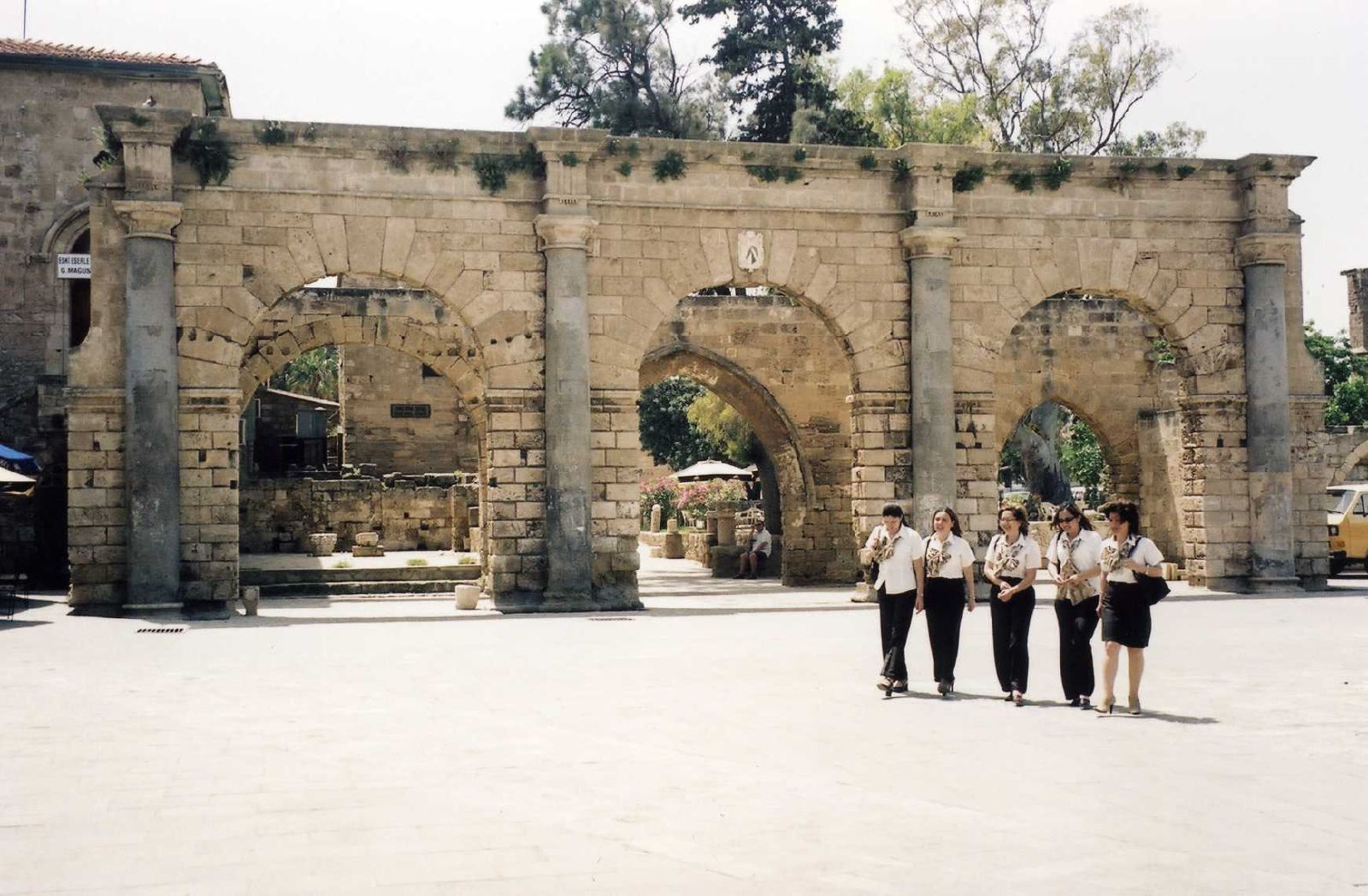
The facade of the palace

Palazzo del Provveditore, commonly known as the Venetian Palace, was a royal palace in Famagusta, originally built by the Lusignan Kings of Cyprus. It was later modified and used as the governor's official residence during Venetian rule. The central sections of the palace have been completely destroyed, with only its grand facade and back courtyard walls remaining.

== History ==
Lusignan kings used Famagusta as their second place of residence, in addition to Nicosia. The exact year when the palace was first built remains uncertain, however, most resources have adopted the years 1300 to 1302, reported by Genoese official Lamberto di Sambuceto, who used the term "palace of the King of Cyprus" (Latin: domini regis Cipri) to refer to the building. The king responsible for its construction is also uncertain. Camille Enlart has proposed Henry II.

The Venetians greatly renovated the palace, along with the city's walls and other public spaces. The front facade and the back of the palace was completely changed. Architecturally, the Gothic features were replaced with Italian Renaissance architecture. This occurred in the 16th century, and the precise dates given by Selton and Hazard are 1552 to 1554.

Most sources hold that the central sections were destroyed during the Siege of Famagusta in 1571, despite Ottoman descriptions of the palace in 1571 making no mention of any destruction. Structures of the palace were used as military barracks, a prison and a site for military drills during Ottoman rule, leading to the building losing its importance in the urban fabric. There is no indication of any restoration during this time. During British rule, the building was used as a prison and police headquarters for some time. In the mid-20th century, the remaining structures were evacuated, parts converted into the Namık Kemal Dungeon Museum and the courtyard used for display of military equipment. Some modern cannons, cannonballs and "pieces of a large granite column" are currently displayed in the courtyard.

== Architecture ==
The palace is a rare example of Renaissance architecture in Cyprus. The surviving parts are the front facade, with its three arches and a coat of arms on the middle arch, an "arm" attached to this to the southeast, a chapel and an L-shaped wall at the very back of the courtyard. The arch at the front was made from material from Salamis: both the columns and the stones originate from there.

Behind the facade are a number of arches that run parallel to it and are very plain in comparison. It has been proposed that these are remnants of the original Lusignan palace. In the "arm" attached are small rooms facing the courtyard that have been used as prisons or arsenals and shops accessible from the street in the ground floor, an Ottoman-era structure used by the Department of Antiquities and some structures built in mid-20th century. Cross vaults and walls thicker than a metre in some of the shops indicate elements that predate Venetian rule in these structures.

There is evidence that the chapel has been modified over time. The chapel had been used as a museum up to 1974 and had been restored between 1930 and 1950. The L-shaped walls date to the Venetian era. Enlart has proposed that parts of this may have surrounded a great hall.

Not much is known about the destroyed parts of the palace. Work by the Department of Antiquities has shown the presence of cisterns. Engravings and the account of a 15th-century traveler indicate that the palace had two floors, even though the current entrance only has one floor. In an engraving dated to 1571, a balcony was shown in the front of the palace.
