= Nam-ı Kemal jokes =

Nam-ı Kemal jokes (Turkish: Nâm-ı Kemâl fıkraları) are a variety of dirty jokes in Turkish folk literature that originated during the Ottoman era. In the archaic Ottoman Turkish language, the phrase nam-ı Kemal means "[a man] named Kemal", i.e. a generic and unconventionally humorous everyman. However, due to the phrase's vocal similarity with the name of one of the foremost figures in Turkish literature, the poet and playwright Namık Kemal (1840–1888), the jokes underwent an evolution. With the growing obscurity of Ottoman terms among most speakers of modern Turkish, "nam-ı Kemal jokes" became, more often than not, "Namık Kemal jokes", an example of a mondegreen. The obscenity of the "nam-ı Kemal jokes" tradition is based mainly on phallic exaggerations.
