= Çırağan incident =

1878 coup attempt in the Ottoman Empire

- The attempted coup in front of the Cheragan Palace in Constantinople on 20 May (Illustrirte Zeitung, May 1878)
Date	20 May 1878
Location	Çırağan Palace, Constantinople, Ottoman Empire
Result	Defeat of Ali Suavi and rebels

Belligerents
Ottoman Empire	Rebels

Commanders and leaders
(Ottoman Empire) Yedisekiz Hasan Pasha	Ali Suavi †

Casualties and losses
	150–250 rebels killed

The Çırağan incident, also known as the Ali Suavi incident (Ottoman Turkish: واقعه چراغان, romanized: Vak'â-yı Çırağan), was a failed coup attempt that took place on May 20, 1878 by a group of dissident people led by Ali Suavi to replace Ottoman sultan Abdul Hamid II with his brother Murad V who was held in Çırağan Palace.

== Background ==
On May 30, 1876, Ottoman sultan Abdulaziz was overthrown in a coup d'état led by Midhat Pasha and several constitutionalist ministers. Following Abdulaziz's removal, his nephew Murad V ascended the throne, becoming the 33rd sultan of the Ottoman Empire However, the suicide of Murad's deposed uncle only days after his accession stunned him. The new sultan suffered from mental health issues, compounded by his struggle with alcoholism, which led to a mental breakdown and severe illness, becoming evident in his behavior. Noticing the new sultan's mental instability, government leaders called in Dr. Maximilian Leidesdorf, a specialist in psychiatric disorders, who concluded that the Sultan could make a complete recovery with three months of treatment in a clinic. In order to implement their reformist plans, the constitutionalist ministers declared Murad deposed on August 30, 1876, and elevated his younger brother, Abdul Hamid II, to the throne, who supported introducing a parliamentary system. Murad's reign lasted only ninety-three days, the shortest in the history of the Ottoman Empire. Abdul Hamid ordered Murad and his entourage transferred to Çırağan Palace along the shore of the Bosphorus.

Nine months after the deposition, Murad regained his mental faculties. After a period of time, observing the former sultan's recovery, his supporters secretly began plotting to restore him to the throne. The first two years of Murad's confinement in Çırağan witnessed three attempts by supporters to free him and restore him to the throne, but all three resulted only in Abdul Hamid's tightening the cordon that isolated Çırağan Palace from the city around it. Abdul Hamid had several opponents within the Ottoman royal family which became evident in subsequent conspiracies against him following his ascension to the Ottoman throne.

== Events ==
Following Murad V's recovery, opposition groups became increasingly active. A plan was devised to liberate him and restore him to the throne. Prince Ahmed Kemaleddin and Prince Süleyman, Murad's brothers, along with Princess Seniha, Princess Fatma, and Mahmud Celaleddin Pasha, were all involved in the plot; however, Murad himself was unaware of the coup attempt. Notably, Mahmud Celaleddin most likely worked for Abdul Hamid II, while presenting himself as a sympathizer of Murad to gain his trust.

On May 20, 1878, Ali Suavi, one of Abdul Hamid's opponents, and some 250 Circassian refugees from the recent Russo-Ottoman War went to Çırağan Palace by boat and neutralized the palace guards. The Ottoman battleship Mesudiye was anchored offshore to transfer Murad. The rebels entered the palace and sent Murad's son, Prince Mehmed Selaheddin, to inform him of the coup attempt. As Murad emerged, Ali Suavi and Nişli Salih, an army deserter, held his arms to escort him out, but his mother, Princess Şefkevza, opposed them, expressing concern that her son would be harmed in the uproar.

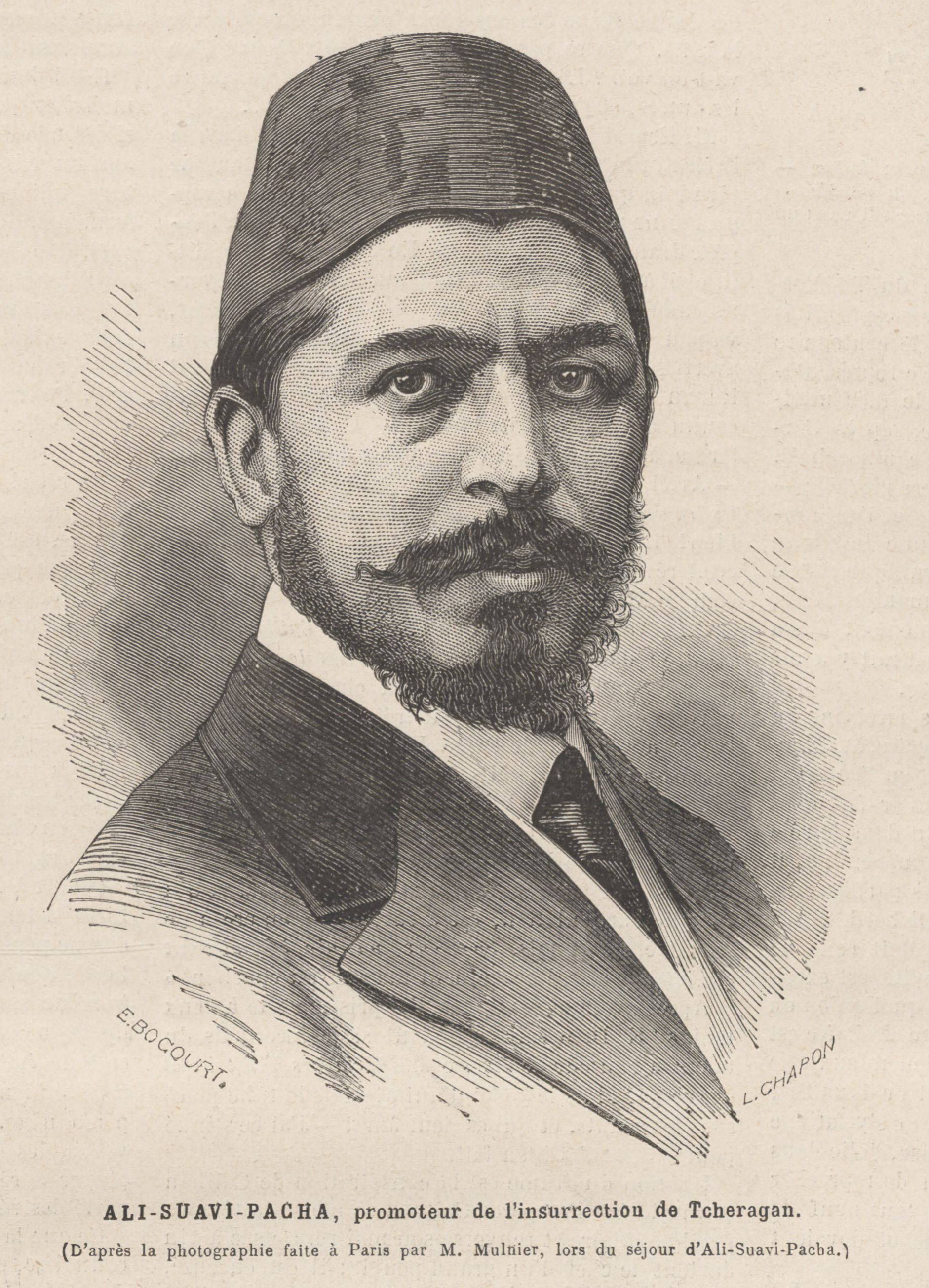
Ali Suavi, the Ottoman journalist, political activist

Meanwhile, soldiers under the command of Beşiktaş Guard Yedisekiz Hasan Pasha arrived at the scene. Hasan Pasha struck Ali Suavi in the head with a thick stick, killing him as Murad passed by. According to İngiliz Said Pasha, moments before his death, Ali Suavi took Murad's arm and said to him, "O our Lord, come and save us from the Muscovites." ("Aman efendimiz, gel bizi Moskoflardan ḫalâṣ et.") This caused Murad to step back, leaving Nişli Salih exposed. Salih tried to lunge at Hasan Pasha but was also killed. Hasan Pasha then opened fire on the rebels, who attacked him with large knives. As the gunfire continued, the rebels began to flee and scatter throughout the palace, while some engaged the soldiers, attempting to wrestle their weapons away. Amid the chaos, one of the rebels lunged at Murad, but a young kalfa named Ruşen threw her strong, burly body at him, knocking him to the ground and disarming him in a struggle.

Troops from Yıldız Palace soon arrived to assist Hasan Pasha, while two kalfas escorted Murad to a secret treasury vault known as the Stone Room, where they hid. All of these events happened within just 15-20 minutes. After a brief silence, another clash erupted as the army began searching for and killing the remaining rebels. The rebels had scattered throughout the palace; some fled to the harem quarters, while others, in a state of panic, threw themselves into the Bosphorus. A few rebels pleaded with the harem girls to hide them, thus surviving the purge. They were secretly sheltered in the palace for days and later escaped with the help of the harem girls. Once order was restored, Murad emerged from his hiding place. The coup attempt was successfully repelled, and no further efforts were made to restore Murad to the throne after this.

== Aftermath ==
After the incident, Abdul Hamid II became increasingly paranoid about the possibility of being overthrown, while his brother Murad V ceased to be a viable rival. Murad and his entourage were initially transferred to the Malta Pavilion but were returned to Çırağan Palace after fifteen days.

Feeling threatened, Abdul Hamid established the Ottoman secret police two years later. The primary task of its members was to gather information and spy on dissident groups operating both inside and outside the empire.

== Sources ==
- Brookes, Douglas Scott (November 2008). The Concubine, the Princess, and the Teacher. University of Texas Press. ISBN 9780292718425.
