= Umur-u Hafiye =

Turkish intelligence agency

The Umur-u Hafiye (Ottoman Turkish: امورِ خفیە) was a domestic intelligence organisation in Ottoman Empire, which was active during Abdulhamid II era. The organisation was officially under the direction of the Zaptiye Teşkilatı (the Ottoman Gendarmerie), but in practice it was linked directly to the Sultan, Abdulhamid II.

The consistence of the organization was formed from three sections. The first section's mission was searching, finding and collecting the information about anti governmental organisations and individuals. The second section's mission was editing and reporting the information. The third section's mission was to inform Abdulhamid II.

== See also ==
Yıldız Intelligence Agency
