= Namık Kemal Dungeon =

Coordinates: 35.1247°N 33.9419°E

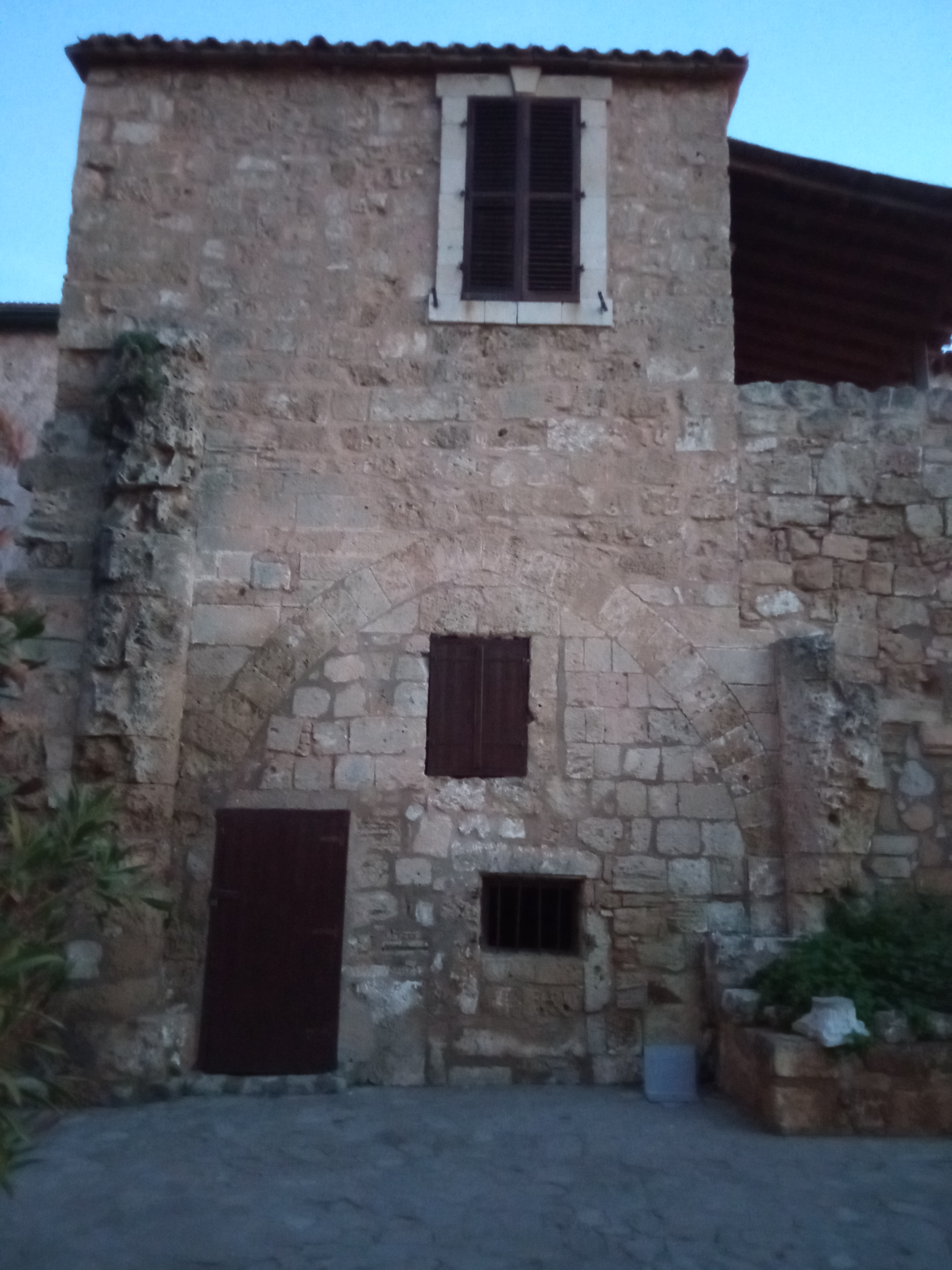
Namık Kemal Dungeon and Museum, Famagusta

Namık Kemal Dungeon (Turkish: Namık Kemal Zindanı) is a historical building in Famagusta, Cyprus, known for being the abode of influential Turkish writer Namık Kemal between 1873 and 1876.

The site of the building was originally part of the Palazzo del Provveditore (Venetian Palace), the building as it currently stands was built during the Ottoman era. The building has two floors, with its lower floor carrying displaying pre-Ottoman architecture and its upper floor being distinctly Ottoman in style. Archaeologist Tuncer Bağışkan has identified the pre-Ottoman style as Lusignan. The building is in an L-shape and whilst the lower floor is made of ashlar, the upper floor was built using the Baghdadi technique.

On 5 April 1873, when Namık Kemal's play Vatan Yahut Silistre was played in the Gedik Pasha Theater in Constantinople, he was seen as a potential revolutionary and a threat by Sultan Abdülaziz and exiled to Cyprus. At first, he was imprisoned in a small cell in the lower floor.

Afterward, with the permission of Veyis Pasha, the mutasarrıf of Cyprus, he was transferred to the room at the upper floor. When Abdülaziz was dethroned, Namık Kemal was pardoned by Murad V on 3 June 1876 and returned to Constantinople on 29 June 1876. Kemal penned his plays Gülnihal and Akif Bey in the dungeon.

Kemal wrote extensively on Famagusta, giving an extremely negative view of the city, and described his initial small cell as too dark and a place unsuitable for living.

The dungeon was reportedly used by the British authorities during the First World War.

At the beginning of 1993, the Department of Antiquities of Northern Cyprus started work on the restoration of the dungeon and appropriate arrangements to allow its use as a museum. In six months, the work was complete and the dungeon was opened as a museum. The museum contains many belongings of Kemal and documents relating to him.
