= Ziya Pasha =

Ottoman writer, translator and administrator

Abdul Hamid Ziyaeddin
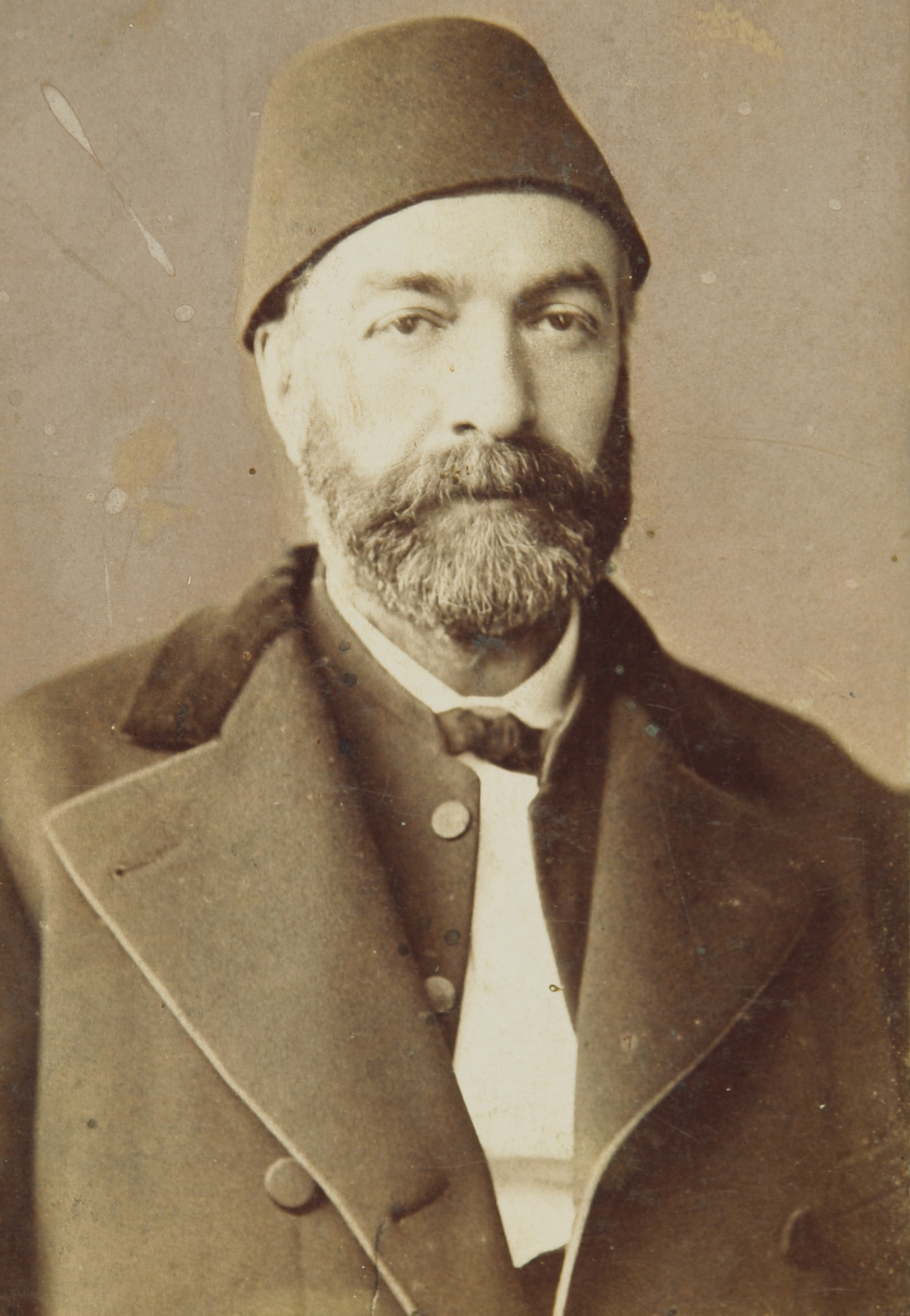
- Photograph of Ziya Pasha taken by the Abdullah Frères
- Born: 1829; Istanbul, Ottoman Empire
- Died: 17 May 1880; Adana, Adana Vilayet, Ottoman Empire
- Occupation: Author
- Writing career
- Language: Ottoman Turkish, Turkish

Ziya Pasha, the abbreviated name of Abdul Hamid Ziyaeddin (1829, Constantinople – 17 May 1880, Adana), was an Ottoman writer, translator and administrator. He was one of the most important authors during the Tanzimat period of the Ottoman Empire, along with İbrahim Şinasi and Namık Kemal.

He held several state offices. From 1865, he was a leading member of the reformist secret society known as the Young Ottomans. In 1867, he went with Namık Kemal to Paris and London, where he published a newspaper called Hürriyet (Freedom).

His return to the Ottoman Empire was followed by tenures as governor of Cyprus, Amasya, Konya, Aleppo, and Adana, where he died in 1880.

== Works ==
- Terkîb-i Bend
- Zafername
- Şi'ir ve inşâ
- Hârâbat
