= Namık Kemal House Museum, Tekirdağ =

Namık Kemal House Museum
- Namık Kemal Evi Müzesi
- Location of Nazım Hikmet House Museum
- Established: December 21, 1993
- Location: Tekirdağ, Turkey
- Coordinates: 40.97898°N 27.51670°E
- Type: House museum
- President: Mehmet Serez

The Namık Kemal House Museum (Turkish: Namık Kemal Evi Müzesi) is a historic house museum in Tekirdağ, northwestern Turkey devoted to the life and works of Namık Kemal (1840–1888), Turkish nationalist poet. It is a rebuilt 19th-century house, which was transformed 1993 into a museum.

== Building ==
The house was rebuilt in 1992 with donations made by local official and charitable organizations. It is a three level house in Ottoman architectural style designed after the still standing, old houses in the direct neighborhood.

The house, situated on a hill, is encircled by a large garden with walls. A big garden gate opens to the street in front of the house, named after him, Namık Kemal Caddesi. In the garden, there is a small open air theater with stage and audience space.

The exterior of the building is covered with wood to give appearance of an old wooden house. The house can also be entered over a few steps at the basement level. The ground floor is paved with marble. Six rooms of the house are made of wood.

== Museum ==
In the museum, which was officially opened on December 21, 1993, also ethnographical items collected from the region are on exhibit in addition to the items relating to Namık Kemal.

The basement, outfitted with big boards, is allocated for exhibitions.

The entrance hall at the ground floor is decorated with portraits of the poet. There are also oil paintings depicting the grave of Namık Kemal in Bolayır on the Gallipoli Peninsula, and portrait of the Hungarian national hero Francis II Rákóczi (1676–1735), who spent his last years in exile in Tekirdağ. On two boards in the living room, a list of places that were named in memoriam of Namık Kemal, news in the media about him, documents, photos of his family members, as well as of old Tekirdağ are posted. 19th century traditional handicraft works, lighting devices, utensils to prepare and serve Turkish coffee and Turkish tea are additional items of interest that are on display.

Next to the living room is the kitchen, were almost every kitchenware used in and around Tekirdağ are on exhibit, like food grinding and preparation tools, cooking utensils and diverse food storage containers.

The building's original pantry is arranged as an exhibition room devoted to Mustafa Kemal Atatürk's military career during the Battle of Gallipoli (1915–1916). Additionally, documents and photos are here on display, related to Atatürk and Tekirdağ together following the foundation of the Turkish Republic.

The wall of the staircase leading to the first floor is decorated with a photo of Namık Kemal with his grandson, and oil paintings depicting Alp Arslan (1029–1072), the third sultan of the Seljuk dynasty, as well as the conqueror of Anatolia, Süleyman Pasha (1316–1357), the conqueror of Rumelia, during his crossing the Dardanelles by raft, and the Ottoman Sultan Selim I (1465–1520), who died at Çorlu, Tekirdağ Province underway to a military campaign in Europe.

The second floor is arranged as a drawing room of a typical Tekirdağ house. The chamber is furnished with divan, corner pillows, kilims, a Salonica brazier, a cabinet made of walnut timber and its big mirror, and closets. In addition, items like wedding dresses specific to Tekirdağ, censers, oilcans, dowry bundles, money bags etc. are on display.

Another room is devoted to notable people, musicians and artists, who were born or worked in Tekirdağ.

In the hall, oil paintings showing Namık Kemal, an old Tekirdağ mansion and a street in Uzunköprü are hanging on the walls. In a glass cabinet, photos taken in 1883 are on display, of places like Gallipoli, Lesbos, Rhodes and Chios, where Namık Kemal served as governor and died in 1888. In another big cabinet, a copy of the first issue of the newspaper "Hürriyet" (Turkish for "Liberty"), he published in London, is shown together with his letters, translations and a prayer mat.

The room devoted to Namık Kemal himself consists of a picture of his grandfather Abdüllatif Bey, a district governor, with him as he was six years old, a charcoal drawing of Tokatlı Ali Rıza Hafız, who gave him his personal name, his pedigree chart and his life story. A piano and prayer rugs are found also in this room.

Namık Kemal House Museum is open to public on weekdays.
