= Vatan Yahut Silistre =

Theater play

- First page of the Ottoman Turkish edition of Vatan Yahut Silistre, copy created in 1888
- Original language: Ottoman Turkish
- Written by: Namık Kemal
- Setting: Siege of Silistria (1854)

Premiere
- Date: 1872
- Place: Constantinople (modern-day Istanbul)

Vatan Yahut Silistre ("The Motherland or Silistre") was a play composed by the Ottoman poet and political essayist Namık Kemal in 1872. It was one of the first examples of romantic theater in Turkish literature, and included a political narrative shaped around revolutionary ideas revolving around the concept of "nations" and "nationalisms".

== History ==
The play's basic events were taken from the Battle of Shumen, which was fought under Ottoman Sultan Mahmud II (r. 1808–1839). However, in order to make the play appear more fantastic, the play was set during the Battle of Silistre of 1854. Kemal was greatly inspired by the French Victor Hugo (1802–1885) in writing the play. Similar to the first performance of Hugo's Hernani in 1830, which caused riots at the Comédie-Française, Vatan Yahut Silistre first performance in 1873 sparked riots at the Tiyatro-i Osmani (also known as Gedikpaşa theater).

In the play, the readers were addressed by Kemal: "Oh mujahids ready to die in the protection of the homeland!" The audience was then invited by the actors to join the "protest" at the end of the play: "Come on, don’t you have a voice? Long live the homeland! Long live the Ottomans!" This first performance of Vatan Yahut Silistre was met with great enthusiasm by the audience, and appears to have greatly impacted Ottoman politics at the time. After this first performance, the audience protested inside the Tiyatro-i Osmani and demanded reigning Sultan Abdulaziz (1830–1876) be replaced by Sultan Murad V (1840–1904). The audience's slogans were: "Long live the homeland!; Long live the nation!; Long live Namık Kemal!; "We want our [Sultan] Murad". As the play was shaped around the concept of nations and nationalism, it was deemed a threat to the Ottoman State; it inspired the riots in the Tiyatro-i Osmani, which quickly turned into large-scale protests against Sultan Abdulaziz. Kemal used the theater to foster political mobilization against the Ottoman government, an attempt which was rigorously suppressed. Within a week of the debut of Vatan Yahut Silistre, Kemal and some of his comrades of the Young Turk movement were arrested and exiled to Ottoman Cyprus.

When Vatan Yahut Silistre was first staged, the Tiyatro-i Osmani was headed by the Ottoman-Armenian actor and director Hagop Vartovyan (also known as Güllü Agop; 1840–1902). Ayşan Sönmez narrates:

A product of the tanzimat (restructuring) and the constitutional age within which particular, new rights were offered to all peoples of the empire, it is ironic that Vatan Yahut Silistre – staged in the theater directed by Hagop Vartovyan, with a cast of mostly Armenians – seems to have created a kind of patriotic enthusiasm that many suggest triggered the processes of Ottomanization, and eventually Turkification, of Istanbul’s modern theater scene.

== Legacy ==
Vatan Yahut Silistre was printed more than ten times between 1873 and 1972, and was presented on many occasions since its performance up to the present day. The play was presented to the Russian press in 1876 by V. D. Smirnov, and was translated into German by H. Hartt as well as by L. Pekotsch. It was translated into Arabic by Muhammad ibn al-Khayyat. The play received heavy criticism by Murad Bey; however, it was significant for being "the first stage-play having as its subject the Ottoman national virtues". It also significantly influenced Manastirli Rif'at's drama Yā g̲h̲āzī yā s̲h̲ahīd as well as his naẓīre Ṭuna yak̲h̲ud ẓafer.

== Sources ==
- Sönmez, Ayşan (2022). "Reflections on the Legacy of 19th-century Istanbul Armenian Theater Projects in the Contexts of Ottomanism and Turkishness". Journal of the Society for Armenian Studies: 1–15. doi:10.1163/26670038-12342766.
- Tansel, F.A. (1978). "Kemāl, Meḥmed, Nāmiḳ̊ḳ". In van Donzel, E.; Lewis, B.; Pellat, Ch. & Bosworth, C. E. (eds.). The Encyclopaedia of Islam, Second Edition. Volume IV: Iran–Kha. Leiden: E. J. Brill. ISBN 978-90-04-05745-6. OCLC 758278456.
