= Tercüman-ı Hakikat =

Daily newspaper in the Ottoman Empire (1878–1921)

- Type: Daily newspaper
- Owner: Ahmet Mithat Efendi
- Founded: 1878
- Ceased publication: 1922
- Language: Ottoman Turkish
- Headquarters: Constantinople, Ottoman Empire
- OCLC number: 244125110

Tercüman-ı Hakikat (Ottoman Turkish: ترجمان حقیقت, lit. 'Interpreter of Truth') was a daily newspaper published in Constantinople (today-Istanbul), Ottoman Empire between 1878 and 1922.

The first issue was published on 26 June 1878.

Among the news still quoted from this newspaper is one, dated 20 May 1880, that tells the story of a Rum (Greek Ottoman) girl who abandoned her home in Bursa and went to Istanbul together with a Sohte Mustafa, who converted her to Islam, an act which was appealed by the Greek Orthodox Archbishop before the Ottoman authorities, and the decision was overturned immediately.
