= Young Ottomans =

Secret society established in 1865

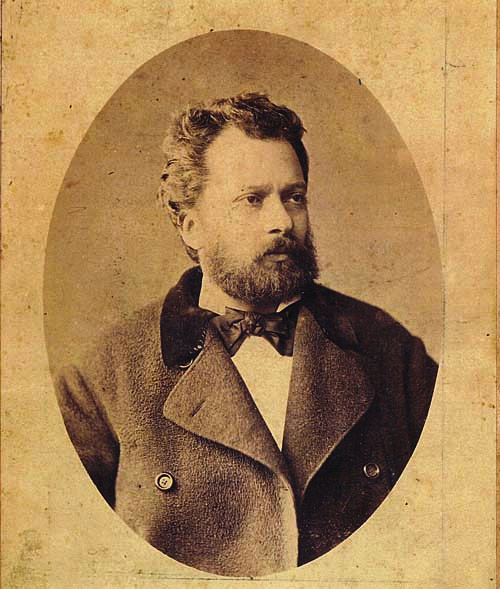
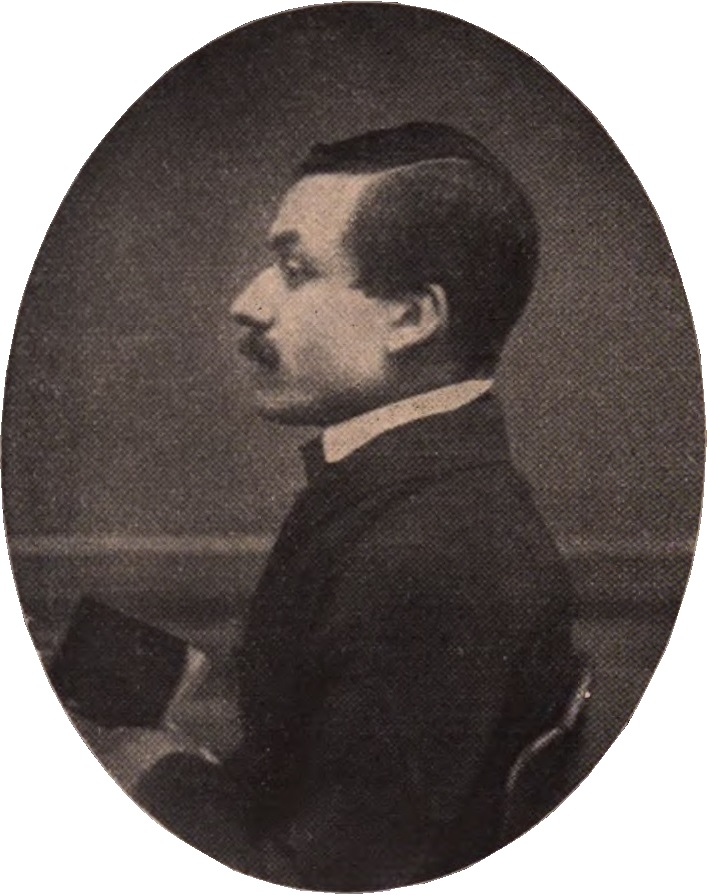
Namık Kemal (1840–1888, left) and İbrahim Şinasi (1826–1871, right), two of the most prominent Young Ottomans, both published reformist newspapers and other works in support of constitutional democracy in the Ottoman Empire and were both repeatedly exiled by the Sultan. Their work led to the short-lived constitution of 1876 and the Empire's First Constitutional Era.

The Young Ottomans (Ottoman Turkish: یکی عثمانلیلر, romanized: Yeŋî ʿOs̱mânlıler; Turkish: Yeni Osmanlılar) were a secret society established in 1865 by a group of Ottoman intellectuals who were dissatisfied with the Tanzimat reforms in the Ottoman Empire, which they believed did not go far enough. The Young Ottomans sought to transform the Ottoman society by preserving the Empire and modernizing it along the European tradition of adopting a constitutional government. The Young Ottomans were frequently in disagreement ideologically, they all agreed that the new constitutional government should continue to be at least somewhat rooted in Islam. To emphasize "the continuing and essential validity of Islam as the basis of Ottoman political culture" they attempted to syncretize an Islamic jurisprudence with liberalism and parliamentary democracy. The Young Ottomans sought for new ways to form a government like the European governments, especially the constitution of the Second French Empire. Among the prominent members of this society were writers and publicists including İbrahim Şinasi, Namık Kemal, Ali Suavi, Ziya Pasha, and Agah Efendi.

In the 1876 revolution, Midhat Pasha organized a conspiracy with the Young Ottomans to overthrow Sultan Abdul Aziz in order to promulgate a constitution, bringing Murad V to the throne. With his mental breakdown, another deposition made Abdul Hamid II sultan. 1876, the Young Ottomans had their defining moment when Abdul Hamid II reluctantly promulgated the Ottoman constitution of 1876 (Turkish: Kanûn-u Esâsî), the first attempt at a constitution in the Ottoman Empire, ushering in the First Constitutional Era. This period was short-lived, with Abdul Hamid II ultimately suspending the constitution and parliament in 1878 in favor of a return to absolute monarchy with himself in power. The influence of the Young Ottomans continued until the collapse of the empire. Several decades later, another Ottoman group, the Young Turks, repeated the Young Ottomans' efforts, leading to the Young Turk Revolution in 1908 and the beginning of the Second Constitutional Era.

== Name ==
=== Historical "jeunes" ===
According to Niyazi Berkes, historically the term jeunes were two groups: Those who wanted a return to the roots of country by reforms (Ottoman Turkish: اصلاحات, romanized: ʾİṣlâḥât) and those who wanted to stage radical reforms (such as adaptation of the European model, separation of the religious and state affairs etc.). M. Şükrü Hanioğlu records that the names "Young Turks" (French: Jeunes Turcs) and "Young Turkey" (French: Jeune-Turquie) were in use for the groups of reformist bureaucrats and for the educated caste since Mahmud II and Abdülmecid I.

=== Usage of the term "jeunes" ===
According to Berkes, differentiation on the usage of the words "New" (Ottoman Turkish: یکی, romanized: Yeŋî) in Turkish and "Young" (French: Jeune, Ottoman Turkish: ژون, romanized: Jön or Ottoman Turkish: جون, romanized: Cön and Ottoman Turkish: گنج, romanized: Genc) in French reflects the perception of the word in the Ottoman public mind. Berkes explains that "Jeunes of Europe" were usually nationalists, republicans and godless; and/or they were perceived as such by the learned-to-illiterate Ottoman public. Thus they were perceived as the enemies of the country and religion. However, such ideas (especially the nationalism) weren't the aims of Young Ottomans, instead these were mostly unwanted for most of them, if not they were against them (see the ideology section).

Both to avoid its negative connotation and because of the hardship of translating its new meaning, initial translation of the term was different (see the next section) than the now famous one. Berkes says that though they dropped the more confusing and indirect names like "Erbâb-i Şebâb", they didn't claimed the name "Jeunes" either, and instead, used the word "New" to replace the word jeunes.

However, contrary to this differentiation in Turkish, they were traditionally and most commonly called as "Young"/"Jeunes" instead of "New" in foreign languages, as in the way of the similar named movements.

=== Used or attributed names ===
There were several names of the movement, most possibly because of the differentiation of thinking among its members, and the way they presented themselves to public. In foreign languages they were recognized as "New Turkey"/"Young Turkey" (French: Jeune-Turquie), "New Ottomans"/"Young Ottomans" (French: Jeunes-Ottomans), and also as "New Turks"/"Young Turks" (French: Jeunes-Turcs), however the last one is usually in the use for the next (and somewhat separated) generation's movement, known as Young Turks.

One of the leading figures of the movement, Namık Kemal, used a rough translation for the term Jeune-Turquie: "Türkistan'ın Erbâb-i Şebâbı" (Ottoman Turkish: تركستانك ارباب شبابي, romanized: Turkistânıŋ ʾErbâb-i Şebâbı, lit. 'Young ones of Turkestan' [i.e., Ottoman Empire]). Another leading figure of the movement, Ali Suavi, used the name Civan Türk (Ottoman Turkish: جوان ترك, romanized: Civân Turk, lit. 'Young Turk').

In its documents and publications organization used the names "Young Turkey" (French: Organisation de la Chancellerie de la Jeune Turquie, lit. 'Organisation of the Secretariat of the Young Turkey') and Yeni Osmanlılar Cemiyeti (Ottoman Turkish: یکی عثمانلیلر جمعیتی, romanized: Yeŋî ʿOs̱mânlıler Cemʿiyyeti, lit. 'Organisation of the New Ottomans'), and was primarily called with the latter by its members.

A predating group of plotters' attributed-and-claimed names were also mistakenly identified with the Young Ottomans. The names "Üss-i Medeniyet" (Ottoman Turkish: اس مدنیت, romanized: ʾUss-i Medeniyyet, lit. 'Base of the Civilization'; used by its founder, Mehmed Bey), "Meslek" (Ottoman Turkish: مسلك, romanized: Meslek, lit. 'The Path'; used in the official court documents) and "Patriotic Alliance" (Ottoman Turkish: اطفاق حمیت, romanized: ʾİṭṭifāḳ-i Ḥamiyyet, lit. 'Alliance of Patriotism'; Turkish: İttifak-ı Hamiyyet; according to Burak Onaran firstly used by Mithat Cemal Kuntay, biographer of Namık Kemal, during the republican era) are of this group. However these were two different groups, and their only relation was earlier one's members' joining to the latter in exile.

== History ==
=== Formation ===
==== The Picnic at Belgrad Forest near Istanbul ====
In the summer of 1865, six young men convened at the Belgrad Forest (Turkish: Belgrad Ormanı) near Istanbul for a picnic to form a group that would become known as the Patriotic Alliance and would be the nucleus of the future Young Ottomans.

Almost all of the men in attendance had at one time or another worked in the Translation Bureau of the Sublime Porte (the metonymy for the Ottoman government) and therefore had knowledge of both European political systems and the inner workings of Ottoman foreign policy.

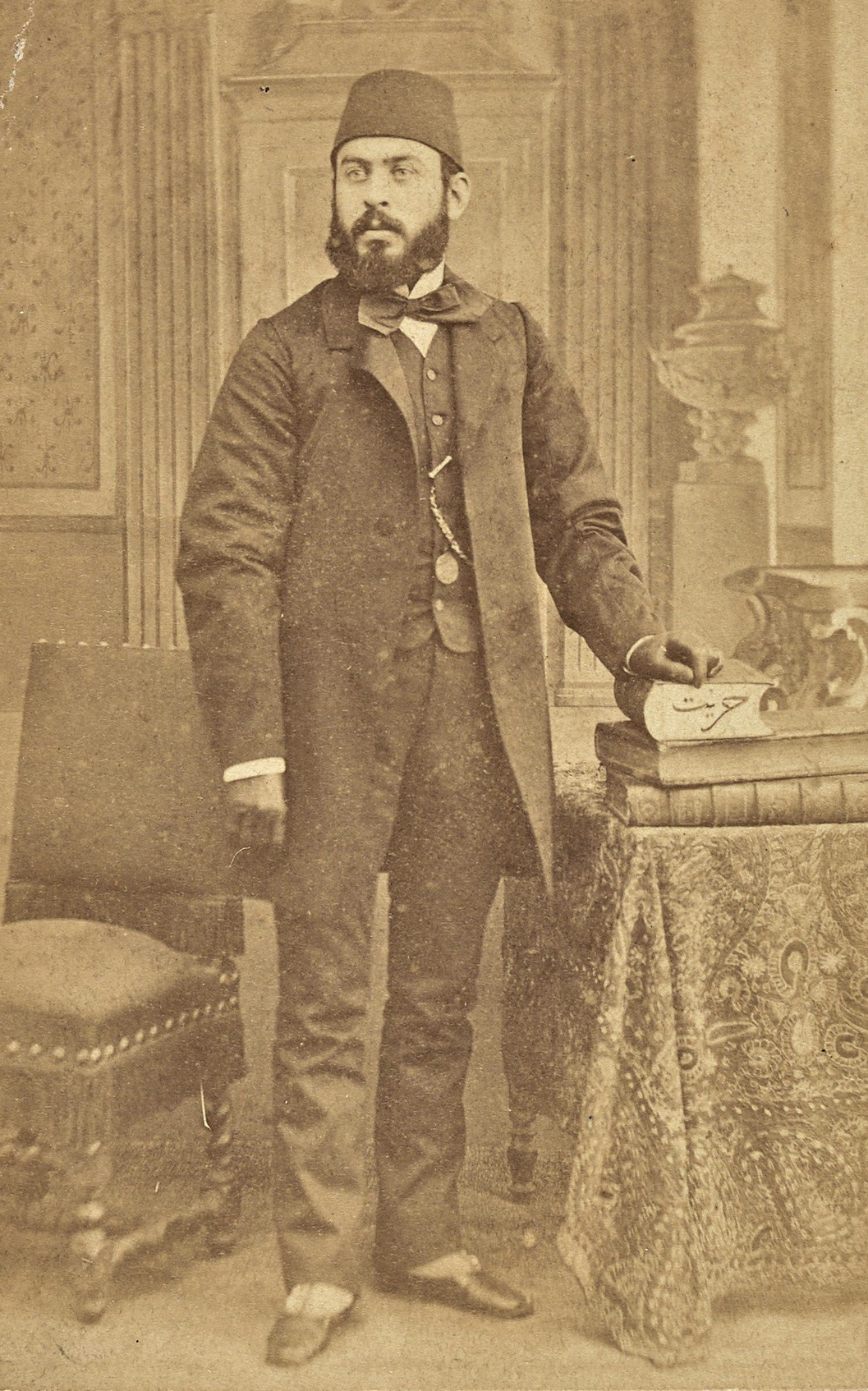
Kayazade Reşat Bey

The six men in attendance were Mehmed Bey, Namık Kemal, Menâpirzâde Nuri, Kayazade Reşat Bey, Ayetullah Bey, and Refik Bey, and all shared a desire to change the way the Ottomans interacted vis-à-vis the European powers in addition to the nature of rule in the empire.

The group attracted a moderate number of followers. "In the course of two years, a few hundred people seem to have joined the society, among them two nephews of the Sultan, Prince Murad (the crown prince) and Prince Hamid."

==== Exile to Paris ====
During the same year, İbrahim Şinasi left control of his newspaper Tasvir-i Efkâr to Namık Kemal, and it was under Kemal’s editorship that the paper became more radical. In 1867, Namık Kemal and other Young Ottomans published the open letter of a disgruntled Egyptian prince Mustafa Fazıl Pasha to the Ottoman Sultan Abdülaziz. This letter advocated constitutional and parliamentary governance. After the publication, the Ottoman government cracked down on the Young Ottomans, causing them to flee to Paris, where they continued operating under the patronage of Mustafa Fazıl Pasha. By the time these exiled publicists had come together under the patronage of Mustafa Fazıl Pasha in Paris, they began calling themselves Yeni Osmanlılar (English: New Ottomans).

=== Publications ===
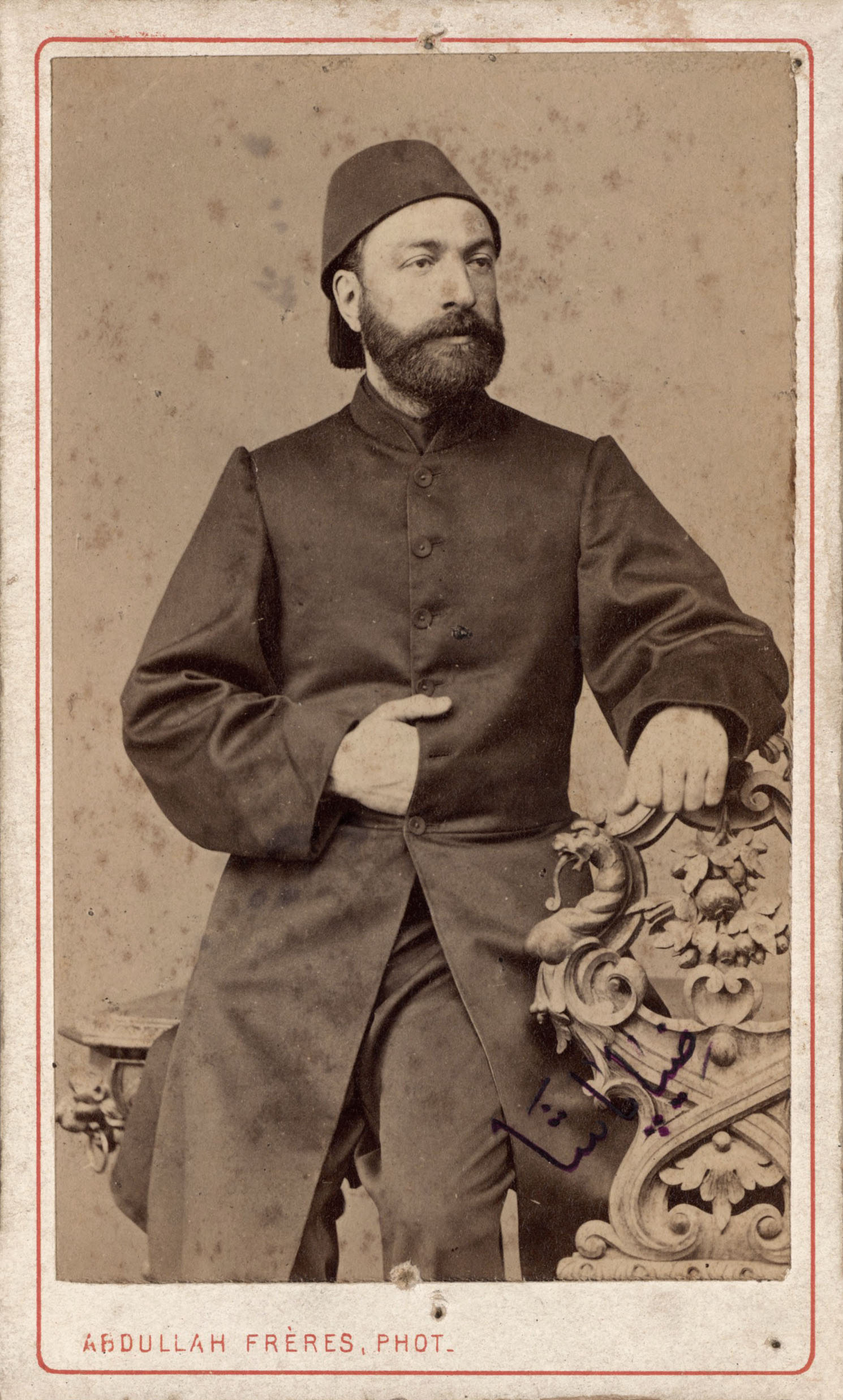
Ziya Pasha

Through the new medium of the press and with the financial support of their ally Mustafa Fazıl Pasha, the Young Ottomans were able to widely circulate their ideas in a number of publications. One of the most important periodicals was Hürriyet ("Freedom"), which was publicized by Namık Kemal and Ziya Pasha beginning in 1868, though many others were published and often took a more radical stance. Other Young Ottoman newspapers included Ulum ("Science"), Inkilab ("Revolution"), Ibret ("Lesson"), and Basiret. These publications voiced dissent and opposition to Ottoman policies that ordinarily would have been stifled. These periodicals circulated widely throughout Europe, having sites of publication in "London, Geneva, Paris, Lyon, and Marseille."

=== Return from exile ===
When Mehmed Fuad Pasha and Mehmed Emin Âli Pasha died in 1869 and 1871, respectively, two of the greatest obstacles to the initiatives of the Young Ottomans were now out of the picture, prompting a number of the exiles to return to Istanbul. The acceptance of Mustafa Fazıl Pasha to a post under Sultan Abdülaziz was also seen as evidence of imminent success. However, it was this return from exile that began to fracture the Young Ottomans, many of whom never shared any sort of established ideological consensus. Ali Suavi resigned from the group while Namık Kemal returned to Istanbul. Ziya Pasha, who had disagreed with Kemal, moved to Geneva to work on another newspaper. With his new Grand Vizier Mahmud Nedim Pasha, Sultan Abdülaziz reasserted his role as the absolute ruler, leaving many of the Young Ottomans disappointed after having been so hopeful that their reforms would be widely accepted.

=== Crisis and the Constitutional revolution ===
==== The Crisis of 1873–1878 ====
During the reign of Sultan Abdülaziz, the Empire was experiencing a period of great financial hardship brought on by catastrophic drought and floods in Anatolia in 1873 and 1874. In an attempt to raise revenue, the government raised taxes on the surviving population, leading to discontent amongst the people. The financial difficulties were exacerbated by a global stock market crash in 1873.

Discontentment amongst the population grew, culminating in a series of revolts that broke out amongst the Christian peasants in the Balkans. Bosnia and Herzegovina were the first to experience rebellions, followed by Bulgaria in 1876. Accusations of atrocities being committed by the Turks, particularly in Bulgaria, did not go unnoticed by Russia, who went to war with the Ottomans on April 24, 1877.

==== The Constitutional revolution ====
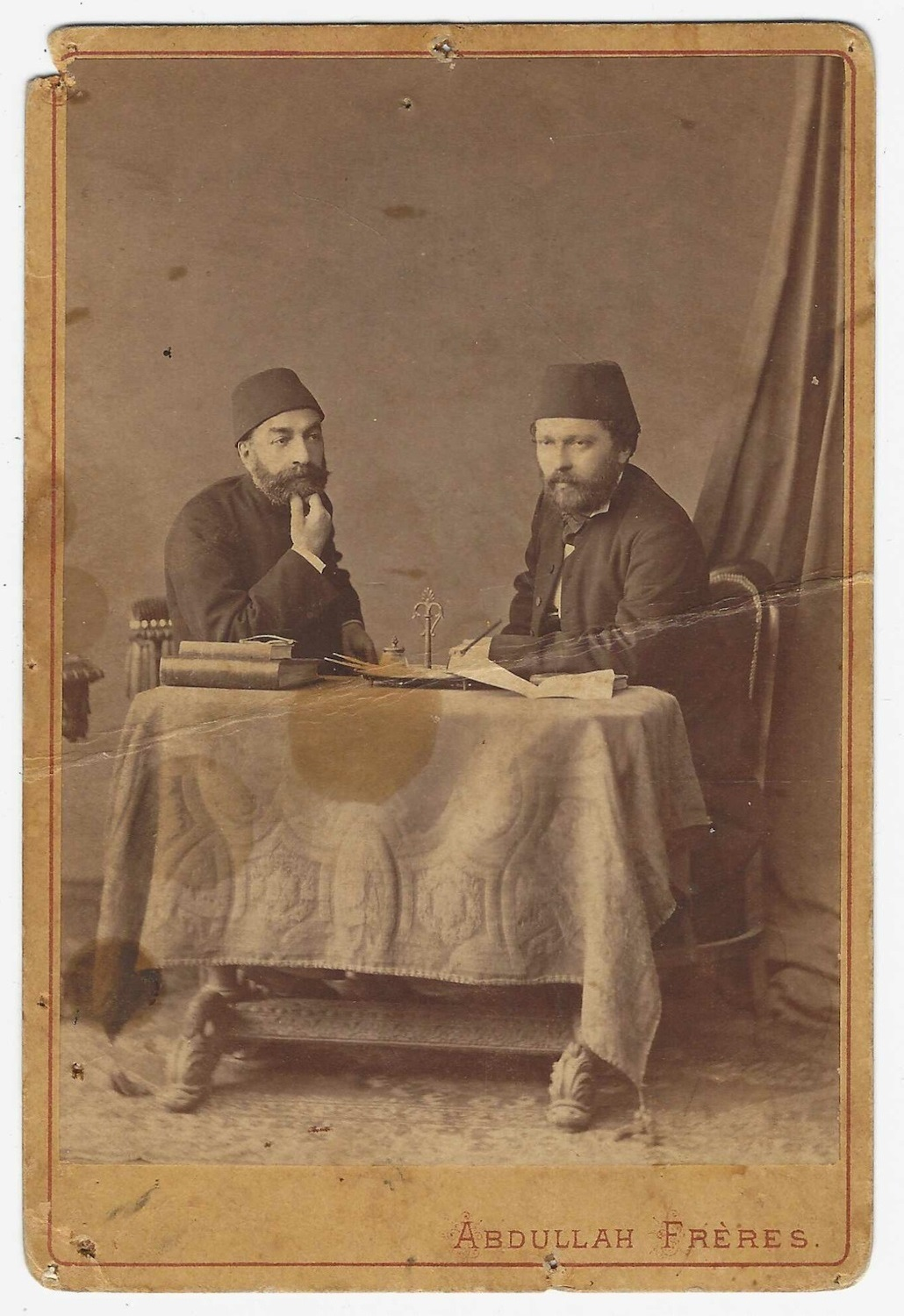
Ziya Pasha and Namık Kemal posing together during their collaboration at the Ḳânûn-i ʾEsâsî ʾEncumeni (Constitutional Commission), 1876 (photograph: Abdullah frères).

According to Caroline Finkel, "the profound cultural dislocation and humiliation being experienced by the majority of Ottoman Muslims found expression at this juncture in strident criticism of the government for its appeasement of foreign powers." Due to the tumultuous environment, the Young Ottomans now had an audience, and action quickly followed. On May 30, 1876, a group of leading Ottoman politicians including Midhat Pasha staged a coup d’état and deposed Sultan Abdülaziz. Prince Murad, who was close with the Young Ottomans, was installed to the throne as Sultan Murad V. Murad had promised to institute the constitution, but he began to listen to his Grand Vizier Rüşdi Pasha, who advocated a cautious approach to reform. After the alleged suicide of Sultan Abdülaziz, Sultan Murad’s mental state began to rapidly decline and he became an alcoholic. "The suicide of his uncle and the murder of several members of his cabinet seem to have led to a severe nervous breakdown." As a result, after only three months on the throne, Murad was declared unfit to rule and was replaced by his younger brother, Hamit Efendi, who ascended to the throne on September 1, 1876, as Sultan Abdul Hamid II.

==== First Constitutional Era of the Ottoman Empire ====
The First Constitutional Era began on December 23, 1876, when Sultan Abdul Hamid II appointed Midhat Pasha as Grand Vizier and promulgated the Ottoman constitution of 1876, although his motives for doing so are suspect as they seemed to be aimed at appeasing Europeans who were in Istanbul for a conference. Indeed, Abdul Hamid II "was distrusted by both the Porte and by intellectuals. The ministers knew that he was deceitful and cunning, and they suspected that his rule would mean a return to imperial control over the affairs of the state." The first Ottoman parliament, the General Assembly of the Ottoman Empire, convened from March 19, 1877, to June 28, 1877, and only convened once more before being prorogued by Abdul Hamid II, ironically using his constitutional right to do so on February 13, 1878. He also dismissed Midhat Pasha and banished him from the empire, effectively ending the first constitutional era and marking a return to centralization of power under the Sultan.

== Ideology ==
The Young Ottomans were not united by a single ideology and their views varied greatly within their own group. Yet they were brought together by a few central shared ideas and a common cause.

=== Constitutionalism ===
The Young Ottomans were brought together by their shared dislike of the bureaucratic and appeasing form that the government had taken on with the advent of the Tanzimat reforms. "Young Ottomans strongly criticized the Tanzimat as a capitulation to European dictates", which they believed was one of the primary reasons for the poor state of the empire. The Young Ottomans called for the development of a constitutional government that was grounded in Islamic concepts, not only to differentiate it from the European governments that they were looking to for inspiration, but also because they wished to preserve one of the core features of Ottoman culture.

=== Ottomanism ===
"[T]he most pronounced impact of the Young Ottomans stemmed from their elaboration of the notion of Ottoman patriotism.... Namik [sic] Kemal developed this concept to its secular conclusion in his poems and his famous play Vatan (Fatherland), all of which extolled the Ottoman fatherland and insisted that all Ottomans ought to share feelings of devotion to this territorial entity above any loyalties they might feel to their religious communities. This was the beginning of territorial patriotism, the belief that there was an Ottoman patrie to which its inhabitants owed primary allegiance."

In the face of the emerging national identities in Europe, the desire for a definition of patriotic Ottoman identity became a unifying factor amongst many lead Young Ottomans. The desired goal of Ottomanism was to overcome the tensions between the Muslim and non-Muslim subjects of the empire and unite them through allegiance to the state.

=== Islamism ===
While the Young Ottomans looked to the Europeans for a model of constitutional government, they maintained that it should be developed within the framework of Islam to emphasize "the continuing and essential validity of Islam as the basis of Ottoman political culture."

=== Liberalism ===
The Young Ottomans syncretized islamic idealism with modern liberalism and parliamentary democracy, to them the European parliamentary liberalism was a model to follow, in accordance with the tenets of Islam and "attempted to reconcile Islamic concepts of government with the ideas of Montesquieu, Danton, Rousseau, and contemporary European Scholars and statesmen." Namık Kemal, who was influential in the formation of the society, admired the constitution of the French Third Republic, he summed up the Young Ottomans' political ideals as "the sovereignty of the nation, the separation of powers, the responsibility of officials, personal freedom, equality, freedom of thought, freedom of press, freedom of association, enjoyment of property, sanctity of the home".

== Legacy and influence ==
One of their greatest legacies of the Young Ottomans in the Ottoman Empire was in their actions, as they were "regarded as the first modern ideological movement among the Ottoman elite of the empire, and they were the first who, through their writings, consciously tried to create and influence public opinion." The use of the press as a tool of political criticism is also attributed to the innovation of the Young Ottomans. Additionally, by assigning new meanings to old terminology, with terms such as vatan ("motherland") and hürriyet ("liberty"), leading Young Ottomans such as Namık Kemal lent the powerful expression of ideologies to later nationalist and liberal groups within the Ottoman Empire.

As the first group to address the issue of Western modernity, future revolutionary movements such as the Young Turks drew both methods and ideology from the Young Ottomans, though they tended to focus on patriotic Ottomanism rather than their emphasis on a return to the fundamentals of Islam. Additionally, their efforts that contributed to the promulgation of the first Ottoman constitution set an important precedent for the Second Constitutional Era of the Ottoman Empire (1908–1918), which began with the Young Turks finally deposing Abdul Hamid II, the same monarch that the Young Ottomans had clashed with, from the throne in the Young Turk Revolution.

== Prominent figures ==
The prominent leaders and ideologists behind the Young Ottomans movement included:

- Writers and publicists:
  - İbrahim Şinasi (1826–1871), founded the newspaper Tasvir-i Efkâr ("Illustration of Thoughts") in 1862 and imparted editorship of it to Namık Kemal in 1865.
  - Namık Kemal (1840–1888), one of the founding members of the Young Ottomans in 1865 and publisher of many opposition newspapers; helped draft the constitution.
  - Ziya Pasha (1825–1880), former secretariat of the palace who had been pressured out of his position and published newspapers in France with Namık Kemal.
  - Ali Suavi (1838–1878), a teacher and preacher with religious training who edited the newspaper Muhbir. ("Reporter")
  - Mehmed Bey, a leading reformer and one of the founding members of the Young Ottomans; nephew of Mahmud Nedim Pasha.
  - Ebüzziya Tevfik (1849-1913), a writer and publisher known for his work editing several newspapers that published Young Ottoman writings, and the author of a history of the group (Yeni Osmanlılar Tarihi, History of the Young Ottomans).
- Political figures:
  - Midhat Pasha (1822–1883), Ottoman prime minister (grand vizier) and reformer who drafted and implemented the constitution.
  - Mustafa Fazıl Pasha (1830–1875), brother to the viceroy of Egypt and grandson of Muhammad Ali of Egypt, principal benefactor and supporter of the Young Ottomans after formally organizing them in 1867 in Paris.

== Bibliography ==
- Ágoston, Gábor and Bruce Masters (2008). Encyclopedia of the Ottoman Empire, Facts on File. ISBN 0-816-06259-5.
- Akgunduz, Ahmet and Said Ozturk (2011). Ottoman History: Misperceptions and Truths, IUR Press. ISBN 975-7268-28-3.
- Finkel, Caroline (2006). Osman’s Dream: the Story of the Ottoman Empire, Basic Books. ISBN 0-465-02396-7.
- Hanioğlu, M. Şükrü (2008). A Brief History of the Late Ottoman Empire, Princeton University Press. ISBN 0-691-14617-9.
- Lapidus, Ira Marvin (2002). A History of Islamic Societies, Cambridge University Press, ISBN 0-521-77933-2.
- Mardin, Şerif (1962). The Genesis of Young Ottoman Thought, Princeton University Press. ISBN 0-691-03018-9. Reprinted in 2000 as The Genesis of Young Ottoman Thought: A Study in the Modernization of Turkish Political Ideas, Syracuse University Press, ISBN 0-815-62861-7.
- Somel, Selçuk Akşin (2003). Historical Dictionary of the Ottoman Empire, Scarecrow Press. ISBN 978-0-8108-4332-5.
- Zürcher, Erik J. (2004). Turkey: A Modern History, I.B. Tauris, ISBN 1-850-43399-2.
