= Namık Kemal =

Turkish writer and activist (1840–1888)

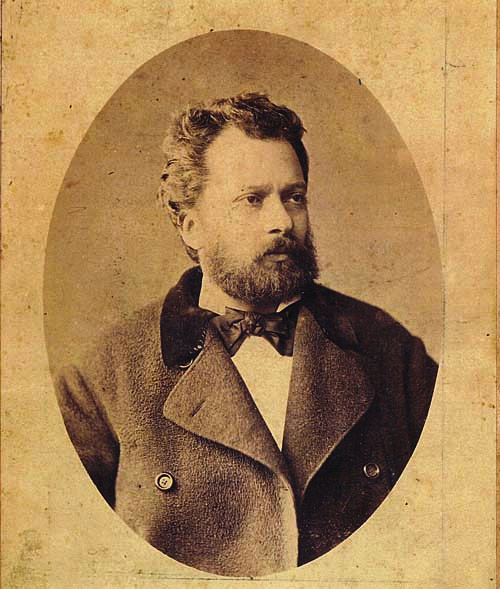
- Born: Mehmet Kemal; 21 December 1840; Tekirdağ, Eyalet of Adrianople, Ottoman Empire (modern Turkey)
- Died: 2 December 1888 (aged 47); Chios, Vilayet of the Archipelago, Ottoman Empire (modern Greece)
- Resting place: Bolayır, Gelibolu, Turkey
- Occupation: Writer
- Writing career
- Period: 1871–1888
- Notable works: Vatan Yahut Silistre; İntibah; Cezmi; Gülnihal
- Movements: Nationalism; Islamic modernism Romanticism

Namık Kemal (Ottoman Turkish: نامق كمال, romanized: Nâmıḳ Kemâl, pronounced [ˈnaː.mɯk ce.ˈmal]; Turkish: Namık Kemal; 21 December 1840 – 2 December 1888) was an Ottoman writer, poet, democrat, intellectual, reformer, journalist, playwright, and political activist who was influential in the formation of the Young Ottomans and their struggle for governmental reform in the Ottoman Empire during the late Tanzimat period, which led to the First Constitutional Era in the Empire in 1876. Kemal championed notions of freedom and fatherland in his plays and poems, and his works had a significant impact on the establishment of and future reform movements in Turkey, as well as other former Ottoman territories. He is often regarded as being instrumental in redefining Western concepts like natural rights and constitutional government.

== Early years ==
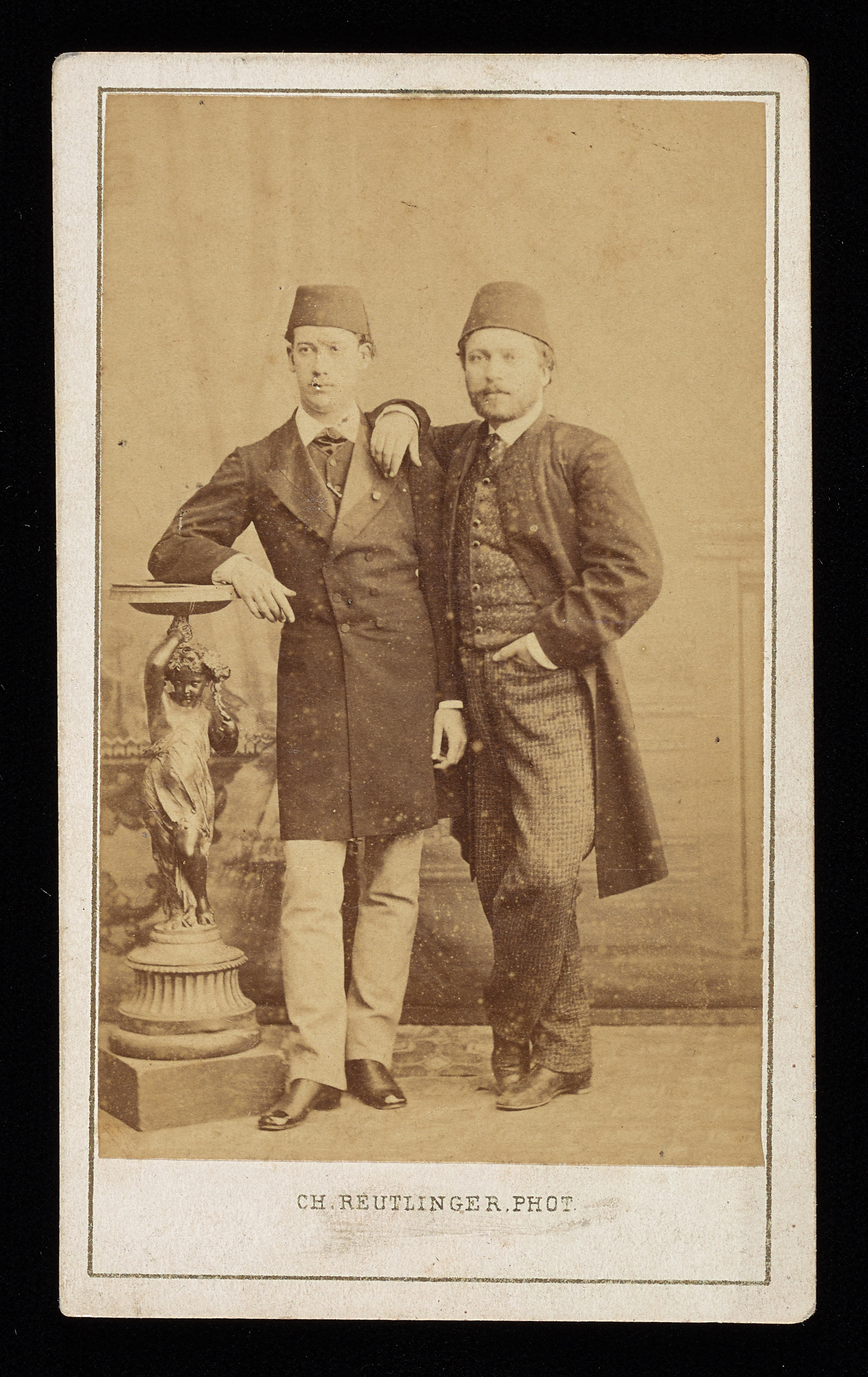
Namık Kemal (on the right) with his friend Kanipaşazade Rıfat Bey

An Ottoman subject, Namık Kemal was born in Tekirdağ (present-day Turkey, then part of the Ottoman Empire) on 21 December 1840, to mother Fatma Zehra Hanım and father Mustafa Asım Bey, the chief astrologer in the Sultan's Palace. Kemal's father was of Turkish descent, his family originally being from Yenişehir in Bursa Province. Since surnames or family names were not in use during the Ottoman Empire, "Kemal" was not his surname, but part of his first name. During his youth, Kemal traveled throughout the Ottoman Empire, staying in Istanbul, Kars, and Sofia, and studied a number of subjects, including poetry. In 1857, at the age of 17, Kemal worked in the Translation Office (Turkish: Tercüme Odası) of the Ottoman Government. However, as a result of the political nature of his writings, Kemal was forced to leave this job by Grand Vizier Emin Âli Pasha and so joined his friend and fellow Young Ottoman, İbrahim Şinasi, at his newspaper Tasvîr-i Efkâr (Herald of Ideas). Kemal worked as the editor of Tasvîr-i Efkâr until his exile and flight to Paris in 1867.

== Political career ==
=== Young Ottomans ===
The Young Ottomans were a group of political activists whose members came principally from the young elite of Ottoman society. The major goal of this group was to institute political reform according to the Western ideas of representative government.

After joining the Young Ottomans in 1862, Kemal continually wrote essays on the subjects of political, administrative, social, and foreign policy reform. In 1864, Kemal took over the pro-reform newspaper Tasvîr-i Efkâr after its previous owner and Kemal's friend İbrahim Şinasi was forced into exile. In 1868, after being forced to seek refuge in Paris, Kemal began to handle the publication of the newspaper Hürriyet ("Liberty"), which also espoused the purpose of the Young Ottomans. Kemal's papers rapidly became a popular venue for Young Ottomans to express their anti-sultanate and pro-parliamentary sentiments. However, as a result of their outspokenness, many Young Ottomans were, like Kemal, forced to flee the empire and seek refuge in Western Europe.

Namık Kemal admired the constitution of the French Third Republic, he summed up the Young Ottomans' political ideals as "the sovereignty of the nation, the separation of powers, the responsibility of officials, personal freedom, equality, freedom of thought, freedom of press, freedom of association, enjoyment of property, sanctity of the home".

Namık Kemal drew on the parliamentary constitution of United Kingdom, in preference to that of France which, under Napoleon III, he considered too authoritarian. London on the other hand, with its "indomitable power of public opinion against authority" he saw as the "model of the world" in political principles.

== Ideology and exile ==
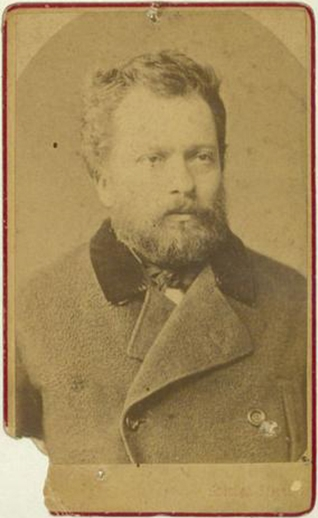
A photo of Namık Kemal taken in Istanbul, 1878.

Namık Kemal was heavily influenced by Western conceptions of the relationship between the government and the people. As such, he and his compatriots spoke out against the movement to centralize the government being undertaken by Sultan Abdülaziz (ruled 1861–1876), and his advisors Emin Âli Pasha and Fuad Pasha. As a result of his criticism of the government, Namık Kemal was exiled from the Ottoman Empire in 1867 and fled to Paris where many other exiled Young Ottomans had found refuge.

In 1869 or 1870, Kemal was allowed to return to Constantinople and proceeded to write for a number of Young Ottoman-run newspapers, and eventually published one of his own, İbret ("Admonition"), in which he addressed more intellectual, social, and national subjects. One of the newspapers he contributed to during this period was Basiret.

In addition, it was after his return to Constantinople that Kemal wrote his most significant and influential work: the play Vatan Yahut Silistre, which translates to "Homeland or Silistra." The play tells the story of an Ottoman soldier whose loyalty to his nation, and not his religion or allegiance to the Sultan, motivates him to defend the town of Silistra, Bulgaria from the Russians during the Crimean War. The impact these nationalist sentiments, unheard of in the Ottoman Empire prior to Kemal, had on the Turkish people was so profound that Kemal's newspaper, İbret, was shut down, and Kemal himself was banished from the Empire for the second time. During this second exile, Kemal took refuge in Cyprus, in a building known as the Namık Kemal Dungeon in Famagusta, where he remained for three years between 1873 and 1876.

His masterpiece, "Ode to Freedom" summarizes his political views.

=== Later career ===
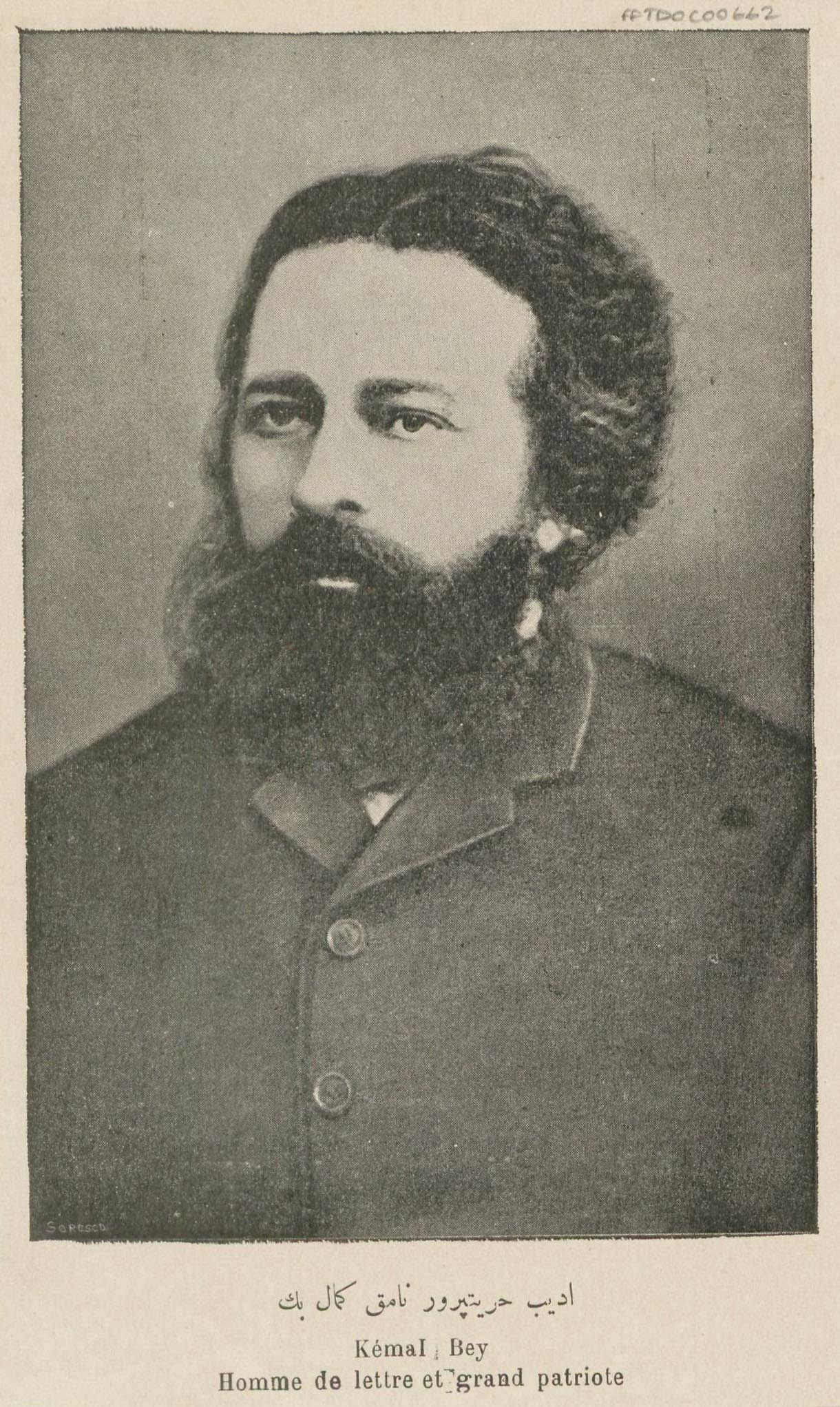
Namık Kemal was one of the leading figures in creating a national identity

Like many Young Ottomans, Namık Kemal supported Murad V’s ascension to the throne after the abdication of Abdülaziz in 1876. However, their hope that Murad would institute the reforms they desired was dashed, for it rapidly became apparent that he was not suited for rule; his weak nerves and alcoholism leading to his abdication after only three months. Namık Kemal protested against Murad’s deposition, and continued to support Murad's Western political perspectives, but ultimately, his pleas failed to have any effect and Murad V stepped down in 1876.

Despite Murad's abdication, the first Ottoman Parliament, the General Assembly of the Ottoman Empire, was established in 1876, largely as a result of pressure from the Young Ottomans, as well as Midhat Pasha’s political influence. However, while, at first, Abdul Hamid II, the sultan who succeeded Murad V, was willing to allow Parliament to function, he quickly decided that it was easier for him to enact reform by seizing autocratic powers instead of waiting for the approval of elected officials. In order to successfully implement his autocratic rule, Abdul Hamid II exiled many Young Ottomans, including Namık Kemal, who were critical of his decision to disregard the Parliament. Thus, for the third time, Kemal was removed from Constantinople by being forced into an administrative position in Chios, where he would die in 1888.

== Legacy ==
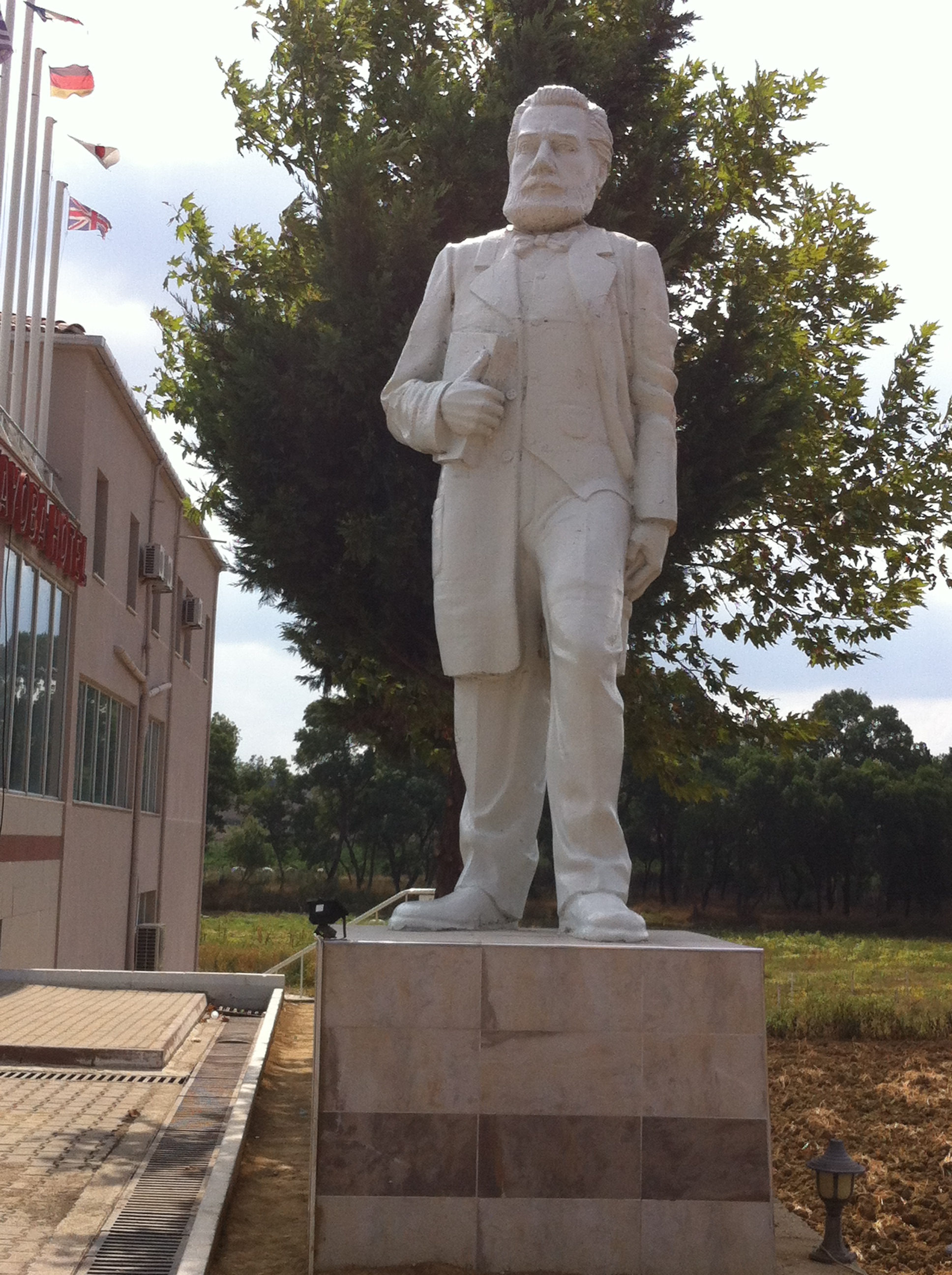
Namık Kemal statue in Tekirdağ

Namık Kemal had an enormous influence on the formation of a Turkish national identity. Kemal's focus on national loyalty, rather than loyalty to a monarch (influenced, as it was, by Western European ideals of self-government) contributed not only to the spread of democracy during the early 20th century, but also to the formation of the modern Republic of Turkey after the dissolution of the Ottoman Empire. The founder of modern Turkey, Mustafa Kemal Atatürk, often remarked that he had been influenced by Kemal's writing as a young man, and that they had subsequently been a source of inspiration for his goals in the formation of the Turkish government and state.

== Bibliography ==
=== Novels ===
- İntibah yahut Ali Bey'in sergüzeşiti (1874), (Awakening, or, Ali Bey’s Experiences)
- Cezmi (1887/88), a historical novel based on the life of a 16th-century khan of the Crimean Tatars

=== Drama ===
- Vatan yahut Silistre (Homeland, or, Silistra)
- Akif Bey
- Gülnihal
- Kara Bela (The Black Curse)
- Zavallı Çocuk (Poor Child)
- Celaleddin Harzemşah

=== Literary criticism ===
- Bahar-ı Daniş Mukaddimesi (Foreword to "Spring of Wisdom")
- Terceme-i Hâl-i Nevruz Bey (Biography of Nevruz Bey)
- Mukaddime-i Celal (Foreword to Celal)
- Tahrîb-i Harabat (Criticism of "Harabat")
- Takip (Follow-up)
- İrfan Paşa'ya Mektup (Letter to İrfan Pasha)
- Renan Müdafaanâmesi (Defense against Renan)
- İntibah Mukaddimesi (Foreword to "Awakening")
- Mes Prison Muahezenesi (Criticism of Mes Prison)

=== Historical works ===
- Bârika-i Zafer (Spark of Victory)
- Devr-i İstîlâ (Age of Invasion)
- Evrâk-ı Perîşan (Scattered Documents)
- Silistre Muhâsarası (Siege of Silistra)
- Kanije Muhâsarası (Siege of Nagykanizsa)
- Osmanlı Tarihi Medhali (Introduction to Ottoman History)

== See also ==
- Namık Kemal University
- Namık Kemal House Museum
- Nam-ı Kemal jokes
