= List of Young Turks =

This is an incomplete list that refers to those who were part of the Young Turk movement in the Ottoman Empire. This revolutionary and progressive movement consisted of several factions, with the Committee of Union and Progress (CUP) at its forefront. Despite the name Young Turks, followers were diverse in their religious and ethnic origins, and some were not from the Ottoman Empire. Aside from Turks, members and supporters were mostly Albanians, Circassians, Kurds, Armenians, Greeks, Jews, and Arabs.

Jewish and Arab members of Ottoman society were among the most active and radical in late Ottoman politics, which could be an explanation for their disproportionally large presence in the movement. British ambassador to the Ottoman Empire Sir Gerard Lowther referred to the CUP as an 'Albanian business' and the 'Jew Committee of Union and Progress' to highlight the ethnic diversity of the Young Turks and the political activeness of ethnic minorities within the movement.

Other majority non-Muslim ethnicities that had a considerable presence in, or a support base for, the Young Turk movement included, but were not limited to: Aromanians, Germans, Hungarians, Poles, and Serbs.

Flag of the 1908 Young Turk Revolution

== List of notable members ==
This is a list of 86 noteworthy members of the Young Turks movement. It is not an exhaustive list, and is therefore subject to additions.

Portrait	Name	Birth date and place	Death date and place	Occupation(s)	Ethnic origin(s)	Other name(s)
	Abdülhalik Renda	November 29, 1881; Yanya, Janina vilayet, Ottoman Empire	October 1, 1957 (aged 75); Erenköy, Kadıköy, Istanbul, Turkey	Acting President of Turkey; Speaker of the Grand National Assembly; Minister of Finance; Minister of Defense	Tosk Albanian	
	Abdullah Cevdet	September 9, 1869; Arapgir, Malatya, Ottoman Empire	November 29, 1932 (aged 63); Istanbul, Turkey	One of the founders of the CUP; Ophthalmologist	Kurdish	
	Abdyl Ypi	1876; Kolonjë, Janina vilayet, Ottoman Empire	January 15, 1920 (aged 43–44); Durrës, Albania	One of the initiators of the Congress of Lushnjë; Politician	Albanian	
	Agop Babikyan	1856; Edirne, Adrianople vilayet, Ottoman Empire	August 1, 1909 (aged 52–53); Istanbul, Ottoman Empire	Jurist; Politician	Armenian	
	Agop Boyacıyan	1854; Tekirdağ, Adrianople eyalet, Ottoman Empire		Jurist; Politician	Armenian	
	Ahmed Niyazi Bey	1873; Resne, Ottoman Empire	1913 (aged 39–40); Vlorë, Albania	Bey; Adjutant Major (kolağası)	Tosk Albanian	
	Ahmet Emin Yalman	1888; Selanik, Salonica vilayet, Ottoman Empire	December 19, 1972 (aged 83–84); Istanbul, Turkey	Journalist; Writer; Academic	Jewish	
	Ahmet Rüstem Bey	April 18, 1862; Lesbos, Eyalet of the Archipelago, Ottoman Empire	September 24, 1934 (aged 72); Istanbul, Turkey	Last Ottoman ambassador to the United States	Polish–British	Alfred Bilinski
	Ahmet Rıza	1858; Istanbul, Ottoman Empire	February 26, 1930 (aged 71–72); Istanbul, Turkey	Key early leader of the CUP; Politician; Educator	Hungarian–Turk	
	Alexander Parvus	September 8, 1867; Byerazino, Russian Empire	December 12, 1924 (aged 57); Berlin, Weimar Republic	Political and financial advisor of the Young Turks; Marxist theoretician Publicist; Activist	Lithuanian Jew	Israel Lazarevich Gelfand, Helphand
	Ali bey Huseynzade	February 24, 1864; Salyan, Russian Empire	March 17, 1940 (aged 76); Istanbul, Turkey	One of the founders of the CUP; Creator of the modern flag of Azerbaijan; Philosopher; Doctor; Writer; Artist	Azerbaijani	
	Ali Münif Yeğenağa	1874; Adana, Adana vilayet, Ottoman Empire	January 4, 1951 (aged 76–77); Adana, Turkey	Minister of Education	Turkish	
	Artin Boşgezenyan	1861; Gaziantep, Aintab Sanjak, Ottoman Empire	1923 (aged 61–62); Aleppo, State of Aleppo	Politician	Armenian	Artin Boshgezenian
	Atıf Kamçıl	1880; Çanakkale, Adrianople vilayet, Ottoman Empire	January 21, 1947 (aged 66–67); Istanbul, Turkey	Politician	Turkish	
	Avram Galanti	January 4, 1873; Bodrum, Aidin vilayet, Ottoman Empire	August 8, 1961 (aged 88); Istanbul, Turkey	Politician; Scholar; Historian	Jewish	Abraham Galante
	Ayetullah Bey	1888; Kadıköy, Istanbul, Ottoman Empire	March 16, 1918 (aged 29–30); Istanbul, Ottoman Empire	Founder and second president of the major Turkish multi-sport club Fenerbahçe SK	Circassian	Anzawurıqo Şəwqiqo Ayetulah-biy
	Aziz Feyzi Pirinççizâde	1878; Diyarbakır, Diyarbekir vilayet Ottoman Empire	February 17, 1933 (aged 54–55); Turkey	Politician	Kurdish	
	Babanzade Ahmed Naim	1872; Baghdad, Baghdad vilayet, Ottoman Empire	August 13, 1934 (aged 61–62); Istanbul, Turkey	Politician; Philosopher	Kurdish	
	Bahaeddin Şakir	1874; Sliven, Adrianople vilayet, Ottoman Empire	April 17, 1922 (aged 47–48); Berlin, Weimar Republic	Politician; Writer	Turkish	
	Bedros Hallaçyan	1871; Istanbul, Ottoman Empire	Paris, France	Politician	Armenian	
	Bekir Fikri	1882; Çorhlu, Ottoman Empire	December 21, 1914 (aged 31–32); Sarıkamış, Kars, Ottoman Empire	Lieutenant colonel (Binbaşı)	Albanian–Turk	Beqir Grebeneja
	Black Musa	1880; Crete, Ottoman Empire	1919 (aged 38–39); Üsküdar, Istanbul, Ottoman Empire	Secret police in the Special Organization of the Ottoman Empire; Volunteer soldier	Sudanese	Zenci Musa
	Celal Nuri İleri	August 15, 1881; Gelibolu, Sanjak of Gelibolu, Ottoman Empire	November 1, 1938 (aged 57); Istanbul, Turkey	Important figure in the transition from a constitutional monarchy to a Republic; Politician; Writer	Albanian	
	Chaim Nahum	1872; Manisa, Aidin vilayet, Ottoman Empire	1960 (aged 87–88); Cairo, Egypt	Last Grand Rabbi of the Ottoman Empire; Scholar; Jurist; Linguist	Jewish	Haim Nahum
	Cherkes Ahmet	Serres, Salonica vilayet, Ottoman Empire	September 6, 1915; Damascus, Syria vilayet, Ottoman Empire	Paramilitary leader	Circassian	Çerkes Ahmet
	Çerkes Ethem	1886; Bandırma, Hüdavendigâr vilayet, Ottoman Empire	September 21, 1948 (aged 61–62); Amman, Jordan	Founder of the Kuva-yi Seyyare; Social bandit Efe; Soldier	Circassian	Ethem the Circassian
	Çerkes Reşit	1887; Karacabey, Hüdavendigâr vilayet, Ottoman Empire	September 10, 1951 (aged 63–64); Bursa, Turkey	Member of Parliament	Circassian	
	Çerkes Tevfik			Soldier	Circassian	
	David Yellin	March 19, 1864; Jerusalem, Jerusalem Sanjak, Damascus Eyalet, Ottoman Empire	December 12, 1941 (aged 77); Jerusalem, Mandatory Palestine	Central in the process of the revival of the Hebrew language Researcher of the Hebrew language and literature One of the leaders of the Yishuv; Founder of the first Hebrew College for Teachers; One of the founders of the Hebrew Language Committee and the Israel Teachers Union; Founder of the Zikhron Moshe neighborhood of Jerusalem; Politician	Jewish	
	Dervish Hima	1872; Struga, Manastir vilayet, Ottoman Empire	April 13, 1928 (aged 55–56); Tirana, Albania	One of the delegates who participated at the Albanian Declaration of Independence; Politician	Albanian	Ibrahim Mehmet Naxhi
	Despina Storch	1894 or 1895; Istanbul, Ottoman Empire	March 30, 1918 (aged 23–24); Ellis Island, Jersey City and New York City, United States	Spy	Greek	Despina Davidovitch, Baroness de Bellville, Madame Hesketh, Madame Nezie
	Djemal Pasha	May 6, 1872; Midilli, Vilayet of the Archipelago, Ottoman Empire	July 21, 1922 (aged 50); Tbilisi, Georgian SSR, Soviet Union	One of the Three Pashas; Military leader	Turkish	Cemal Paşa, Ahmed Djemal
	Djevdet Bey	1878; İşkodra, Scutari vilayet, Ottoman Empire	January 15, 1955 (aged 76–77); Istanbul, Turkey	One of the leaders of the CUP; Governor of the Van vilayet during World War I	Albanian	Tahir Cevdet Belbez, Djevdet Tahir Belbez, Jevdet Bey
	Doctor Nazım	1872; Selanik, Salonica vilayet, Ottoman Empire	July 26, 1926 (aged 53–54); Ankara, Turkey	Founding member of the CUP; Physician; Politician	Jewish–Turk	Selanikli Mehmed Nâzım Bey
	Emmanouil Emmanouilidis	1867; Tavlusun, Melikgazi, Angora vilayet, Ottoman Empire	1943 (aged 75–76); Athens, Greece	Jurist; Politician	Greek	
	Emmanuel Carasso	1862; Selanik, Sanjak of Salonica, Salonica Eyalet, Ottoman Empire	1934 (aged 71–72); Trieste, Kingdom of Italy	Lawyer	Jewish	Emanuel Karasu
	Enver Pasha	November 22, 1881; Istanbul, Ottoman Empire	August 4, 1922 (aged 40); Bukharan People's Soviet Republic, Soviet Union	One of the Three Pashas; Military officer	Albanian–Tatar	İsmail Enver
	Ernst Jackh	February 22, 1875; Bad Urach, Kingdom of Württemberg	August 17, 1959 (aged 84); New York City, United States	Diplomat; Author; Journalist; Professor	German	Ernst Friedrich Wilhelm Jäckh
	Essad Pasha Toptani	1863/1864 or 1875; Tirana, Scutari vilayet, Ottoman Empire	June 13, 1920 (aged 44–57); Paris, France	Prime Minister of Albania; Albanian deputy in the Ottoman Parliament	Albanian	Esad Pashë Toptani
	Eyüp Sabri Akgöl	1876; Ohrid, Manastir vilayet, Ottoman Empire	August 16, 1950 (aged 87–88); Istanbul, Turkey	One of the leaders of the 1908 Young Turk Revolution; Soldier; Politician	Albanian	Ohrili Eyüp Sabri, Ejup Sabriu
	Ferhat Bey Draga	1880; Mitroviça, Ottoman Empire	December 2, 1944 (aged 63–64); Kralan, Gjakova, Yugoslavia	Politician	Albanian	
	Filip Mișea	1873; Chroupista, Ottoman Empire	May 16, 1944 (aged 70–71)	Activist; Physician; Politician	Aromanian	Filip Mişa, Filip Mise Efendi
	Friedrich Naumann	March 25, 1860; Störmthal, German Confederation	August 24, 1919 (aged 59); Leipzig, Weimar Republic	Theologian; Politician	German	Joseph Friedrich Naumann
	Gregorios Anagnostu	1881; Grevena, Ottoman Empire		Lawyer; Politician	Greek	
	Gyula Germanus	November 6, 1884; Budapest, Austria-Hungary	November 7, 1979 (aged 95); Budapest, Hungary	Islamologist; Professor; Writer; Soldier; Politician	German–Jew	Julius Abdulkerim Germanus
	Hacı Sait Efendi	1859; Süleymaniye, Baghdad vilayet, Ottoman Empire		Politician	Iraqi	
	Halil Menteşe	1874; Milas, Aidin Eyalet, Ottoman Empire	April 2, 1948 (aged 73–74); Milas, Turkey	Official in the CUP	Turkish	
	Hasan Prishtina	September 27, 1873; Vıçıtırın, Kosovo vilayet, Ottoman Empire	August 13, 1933 (aged 59); Thessaloniki, Greece	Prime Minister of Albania	Albanian	Hasan Berisha
	Hasan Tahsin	1888; Selanik, Salonica vilayet, Ottoman Empire	May 15, 1919 (aged 30–31); İzmir, Aidin vilayet, Ottoman Empire	Turkish war hero Member of the Ottoman Special Organization; Journalist	Jewish	Osman Nevres
	Hristo Chernopeev	July 16, 1868; Dermantsi, Danube vilayet, Ottoman Empire	November 6, 1915 (aged 47); Krivolak, Kingdom of Serbia	Among the leaders of the Bulgarian People's Macedonian-Adrianople Revolutionary Organization; Army officer	Macedonian–Bulgarian	
	Ibrahim Temo	March 22, 1865; Struga, Manastir vilayet, Ottoman Empire	August 5, 1945 (aged 80); Medgidia, Kingdom of Romania	Main founder of the CUP; Politician; Intellectual; Doctor	Albanian	Ibrahim Ethem Sojliu, Ibrahim Bërzeshta, Ibrahim Starova
	İshak Sükuti	1868; Diyarbakır, Diyarbekir vilayet, Ottoman Empire	February 9, 1902 (aged 33–34); Sanremo, Kingdom of Italy	Writer; Doctor	Kurdish	
	Kâmil Bey el-Esad	1870; Marjayoun, Ottoman Lebanon, Ottoman Empire	1924 (aged 53–54); Marjayoun, Mandate for Syria and the Lebanon, France	Politician	Lebanese	
	Kirkor Sinapyan	Ottoman Empire	1951; Turkey	Politician	Armenian	
	Mahmud Shevket Pasha	1856; Baghdad, Baghdad Eyalet, Ottoman Empire	June 11, 1913 (aged 56–57); Ankara, Turkey	Instrumental figure in the rise of the Young Turks; Generalissimo	Georgian	
	Mehmed Cavid	1875; Selanik, Salonica vilayet, Ottoman Empire	August 26, 1926 (aged 50–51); Ankara, Turkey	Founding member of the CUP; Economist; Newspaper editor	Jewish	
	Mehmed Fevzi Paşa	1859; Damascus, Damascus eyalet, Ottoman Empire		Politician	Lebanese	
	Mehmed Reshid	February 8, 1873; Russian Empire	February 6, 1919 (aged 45); Istanbul, Turkey	Official in the CUP; Economist; Governor of Diyarbekir vilayet during World War I Physician	Circassian	Mehmed Raşid Şahingiray
	Mehmet Akif Ersoy	December 20, 1873; Istanbul, Ottoman Empire	December 27, 1936 (aged 63); Istanbul, Turkey	Author of the Turkish National Anthem; Poet; Writer; Academic; Politician	Albanian–Uzbek	Mehmed Ragîf
	Mişon Ventura	1881; Hasköy, Pera, Istanbul, Ottoman Empire	April 12, 1961 (aged 79–80); Istanbul, Turkey	Jurist; Journalist	Jewish	
	Munis Tekinalp	1883; Serres, Salonica vilayet, Ottoman Empire	1961 (aged 77–78); Nice, France	Writer; Philosopher; Journalist	Jewish	Moiz Cohen
	Nesim Mazliyah	1878; Manisa, Aidin vilayet, Ottoman Empire	September 16, 1931 (aged 52–53); Beirut, Lebanon	Politician	Jewish	
	Nexhip Draga	1867; Mitroviça, Ottoman Empire	1920 (aged 52–53); Vienna, Austria	Important figure of the Albanian National Awakening; Politician	Albanian	Mehmet Nexhip bey Draga, Mehmed Necib Draga
	Nicolae Constantin Batzaria	November 20, 1874; Kruševo, Manastir vilayet, Ottoman Empire	January 28, 1952 (aged 77); Ghencea, Bucharest, Romania	Statesman; Cultural activist Writer	Aromanian	Nikola Konstantin Basarya
	Nuri Killigil	1889; Manastır, Manastir vilayet, Ottoman Empire	March 2, 1949 (aged 59–60); Sütlüce, Istanbul, Turkey	General	Albanian	
	Osman Hamdi Bey	December 30, 1842; Istanbul, Ottoman Empire	February 24, 1910 (aged 67); Istanbul, Ottoman Empire	Founding father of both archaeology and the museum curator's professions in Turkey; Administrator; Intellectual; Painter; Writer	Greek	
	Pavlos Karolidis	1849; Kayseri, Angora eyalet, Ottoman Empire	July 26, 1930 (aged 80–81); Athens, Greece	Historian; Politician	Greek	Pavli Karolidi
	Prenk Bib Doda	1860; Orosh, Mirditë, Ottoman Empire	March 22, 1919 (aged 58–59); Bregu i Matit, Lezhë, Principality of Albania	Prince of Mirdita; Politician in the Principality of Albania	Albanian	Prênk Pasha
	Rafael de Nogales	October 14, 1877; San Cristóbal, Venezuela	July 10, 1937 (aged 59); Panama City, Panama	Soldier; Adventurer; Writer	Venezuelan	Rafael Inchauspe Méndez
	Rexhep Pasha Mati	1842; Mat, Ottoman Empire	August 14, 1908 (aged 65–66); Istanbul, Ottoman Empire	Marshal; Governor; War minister	Albanian	Matlı Recep Paşa
	Ruhi Khalidi	1864; Jerusalem, Jerusalem sanjak, Damascus eyalet, Ottoman Empire	1913 (aged 48–49); Istanbul, Ottoman Empire	Politician; Writer; Teacher	Palestinian	Ruhi el-Halidi Bey
	Said Halim Pasha	January 18 or 28, 1865 or February 19, 1864; Cairo, Egypt Eyalet, Ottoman Empire	December 6, 1921 (aged 56); Rome, Kingdom of Italy	Grand Vizier; General Secretary of the CUP	Albanian	
	Selma Rıza	February 5, 1872; Istanbul, Ottoman Empire	October 5, 1931 (aged 59); Istanbul, Turkey	Journalist; Novelist	Hungarian–Turk	
	Sassoon Eskell	March 17, 1860; Baghdad, Baghdad vilayet, Ottoman Empire	August 31, 1932 (aged 72); Paris, France	Father of the Parliament of Iraq; Statesman	Baghdadi Jew	Ezekiyel Sason
	Shlomo Yellin	1854; Ottoman Empire	1912 (aged 57–58); Ottoman Empire	Lawyer	Jewish	
	Simon Deutsch	1822; Vienna, Austrian Empire	March 24, 1877 (aged 54–55); Istanbul, Ottoman Empire	Businessman; Bibliographer	Czech Jew	
	Spiro Ristiç	1879; Kalkandelen, Ottoman Empire	November 11, 1938 (aged 58–59); Skopje, Kingdom of Yugoslavia	Mayor of Skopje; Politician	Serbian	Spiro Hadzi Ristić
	Süleyman Askerî	1884; Prizren, Kosovo Vilayet, Ottoman Empire	April 14, 1915 (aged 30–31); Berjisiya, Basra Vilayet, Ottoman Empire	Co founder of the Teşkilât-ı Mahsusa; Soldier	Circassian	
	Talaat Pasha	September 1, 1874; Kardzhali, Adrianople vilayet, Ottoman Empire	March 15, 1921 (aged 46); Berlin, Weimar Republic	One of the Three Pashas	Romani–Pomak	Mehmed Talaat
	Tevfik Nazif Arıcan	1883; Prizren, Kosovo vilayet, Ottoman Empire	February 20, 1951 (aged 67–68)	Politician	Albanian	
	Thadée Gasztowtt	June 8, 1881; Paris, France	January 22, 1936 (aged 54); Istanbul, Turkey	Unofficial representative of Polish émigrés Diplomat; Historian; Journalist	Polish–Lithuanian	Tadeusz Seyfeddin Gasztowtt
	Ubeydullah Bey	1858; İzmir, Aidin eyalet, Ottoman Empire	1937 (aged 78–79); Istanbul, Turkey	Politician	Turkish	Mehmet Ubeydullah Hatipoğlu
	Vitali Hayim Faraci	May 13, 1854; Serres, Salonica vilayet, Ottoman Empire	December 5, 1918 (aged 64); Istanbul, Ottoman Empire	Politician	Italian Jew	
	Yane Sandanski	May 18, 1872; Vlahi, Ottoman Empire	April 22, 1915 (aged 42); Blatata, near Pirin, Tsardom of Bulgaria	National hero in Bulgaria and North Macedonia	Macedonian–Bulgarian	
	Yusuf Akçura	December 2, 1876; Ulyanovsk, Russian Empire	March 11, 1935 (aged 58); Istanbul, Turkey	One of the leading university professors in Istanbul; Politician; Writer	Tatar	Yosıf Xəsən uğlı Aqçurin, Yusuf Hasanovich Akchurin
	Yusuf Şetvan	1868; Istanbul, Ottoman Empire	April 14, 1949 (aged 80–81); Istanbul, Turkey	Politician	Arab	
