= Young Turks =

Political reform movement in the Ottoman Empire

Flag of the Young Turk Revolution Top Left: Hürriyet (Freedom), Top Right: Adalet (Justice), Bottom Left: Müsavat (Equality), Bottom Right: Uhuvvet (Brotherhood), Middle Right: İttihat (Union)

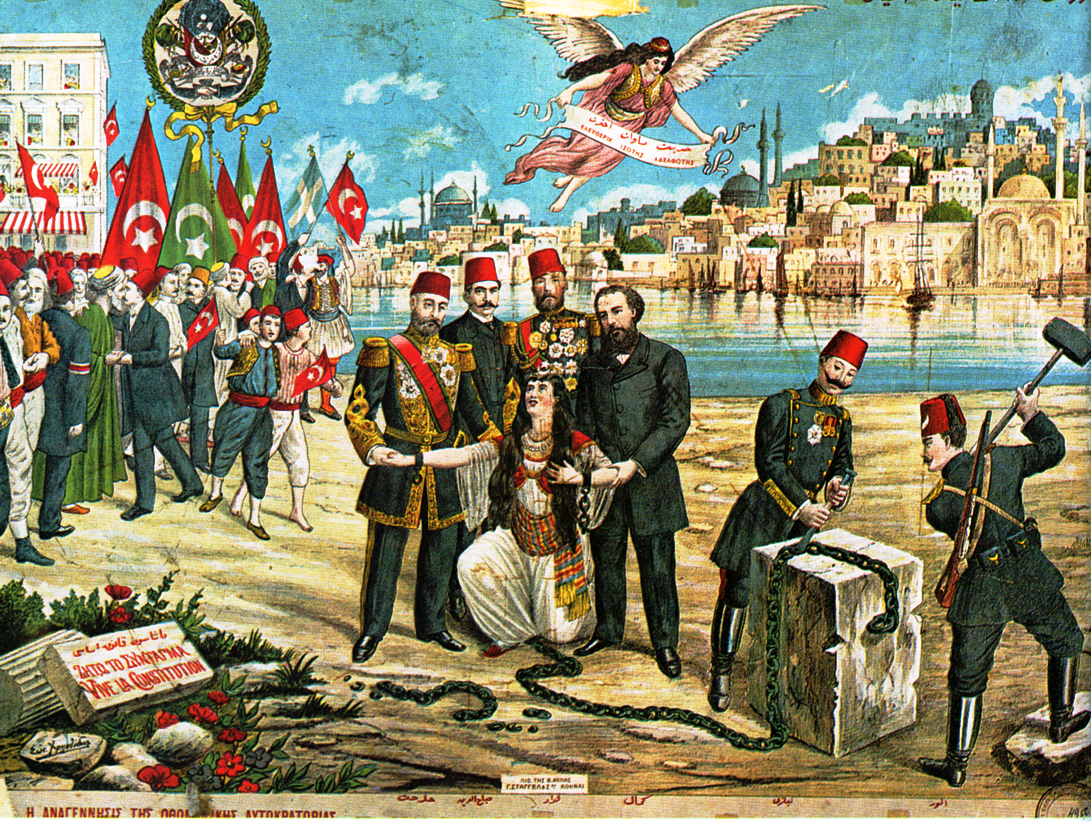
A lithograph celebrating the Young Turk Revolution featuring the sources of inspiration of the movement, Midhat Pasha, Prince Sabahaddin, Deli Fuad Pasha and Namık Kemal, military leaders Niyazi Bey and Enver Pasha, and the slogan "Liberty, equality, fraternity" (hürriyet, müsavat, uhuvvet in Turkish, ελευθερία, ισότης, αδελφότης in Greek)

The Young Turks (Ottoman Turkish: ژون تركلر, romanized: Jön Türkler, also كنج تركلر Genç Türkler) were a broad opposition movement in the late Ottoman Empire to the absolutist régime of Sultan Abdul Hamid II (r. 1876–1909). The prominent organisation within the movement was the Committee of Union and Progress (CUP, founded in 1889), though its ideology, strategies, and membership continuously changed. By the 1890s, the Young Turks were mainly a loose and contentious network of exiled intelligentsia who made a living by selling their newspapers to secret subscribers. Beyond opposition, exiled writers and sociologists debated Turkey's place in the East–West dichotomy.

By and large, Young Turks favored taking power away from Yıldız Palace in favour of constitutional governance, though the movement itself held a mosaic of ideologies. Besides membership in outlawed political committees, other avenues of opposition existed in the ulama, Sufi lodges, and Masonic lodges. The movement was popular especially among young, educated Ottomans and military officers that wanted reforms. They believed that a social contract in the form of a constitution would fix the empire's problems with nationalist movements and foreign intervention by instilling Ottomanism, or multi-cultural Ottoman nationalism.

The Unionists, or members of the CUP, prevailed against Sultan Abdul Hamid II in the 1908 Young Turk Revolution. With this revolution, the Young Turks helped to inaugurate the Second Constitutional Era in the same year, ushering in an era of multi-party democracy for the first time in the country's history. In power, the CUP implemented many secularizing and centralizing reforms, but was criticized for pursuing a pro–Turkish ideology. In the wake of events which proved disastrous for the Ottoman Empire as a body-politic (such as the 31 March Incident of April 1909, the 1912 coup, and the Balkan Wars of 1912–1913), the country fell under the domination of a radicalized CUP following the 1913 Raid on the Sublime Porte.

With the strength of the constitution and of parliament broken, the CUP ruled the Ottoman Empire in a dictatorship, and orchestrated the entrance of the empire into World War I in October 1914 on the side of the Central Powers. The genocides of 1915 to 1917 against Ottoman Christians were masterminded within the CUP, principally by Talat Pasha, Enver Pasha, Bahaeddin Şakir, and others.

The term Young Turk is now used to characterize an insurgent impatiently advocating reform within an organization, and various groups in different countries have been designated "Young Turks" because of their rebellious or revolutionary nature.

== Etymology ==
The term "Young Turks" comes from the French Jeunes Turcs, which international observers tagged various Ottoman reformers of the 19th century. Historian Roderic Davison states that there was not a consistent ideological application of the term; statesmen who wished to resurrect the Janissary corp and derebeys, conservative reformers of Mahmud II, and pro-Western reformers of Abdul Mejid, are all referred to as the party of Jeunes Turcs by different observers. Davison concludes that a Young Turk party was identified in situations where an amorphous "Old Turk" faction was being confronted.

The Young Ottomans, the liberal and Islamist opposition movement to Fuad and Aali Pasha's regime, were also known as Jeunes Turcs, though they called themselves Yeni Osmanlılar, or New Ottomans. Historiographically, the group which became definitively known as the Young Turks was the opposition to Sultan Abdul Hamid II which surfaced after 1889, the Committee of Union and Progress being its standard bearer.

== History ==
=== Origins ===
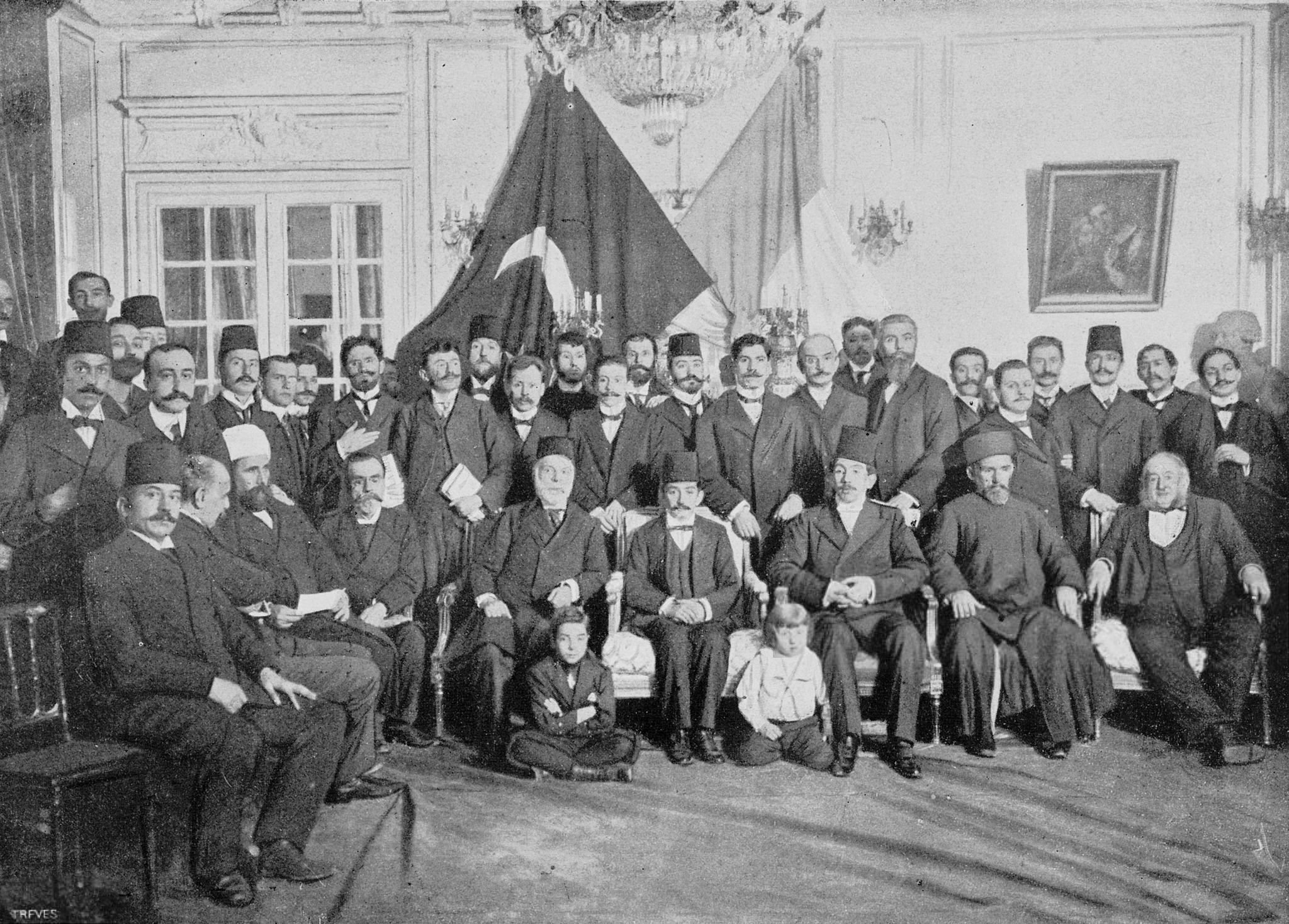
Young Turks who attended the congress held in Paris under the chairmanship of Prince Sabahattin between 4–9 February 1902

Inspired by the Young Italy political movement, the Young Turks had their origins in secret societies of "progressive medical university students and military cadets," namely the Young Ottomans, driven underground along with all political dissent after the Constitution of 1876 was abolished and the First Constitutional Era brought to a close by Sultan Abdul Hamid II in 1878 after only two years. The Young Turks favoured a reinstatement of the Ottoman Parliament and the 1876 constitution, written by the reformist Midhat Pasha.

Despite working with the Young Ottomans to promulgate a constitution, Abdul Hamid II dissolved the parliament by 1878 and returned to an absolutist regime, marked by extensive use of secret police to silence dissent, and massacres against minorities. Constitutionalist opponents of his regime, came to be known as Young Turks. The Young Turks were a heterodox group of secular liberal intellectuals and revolutionaries, united by their opposition to the absolutist regime of Abdul Hamid and desire to reinstate the constitution. Despite the name Young Turks, members were diverse in their religious and ethnic origins, with many Albanians, Arabs, Armenians, Circassians, Greeks, Kurds, and Jews being members. (Note: See List of Young Turks for more information.)

=== Opposition ===
To organize the opposition, forward-thinking medical students Ibrahim Temo, Abdullah Cevdet and others formed a secret organization named the Committee of Ottoman Union, which grew in size and included exiles, civil servants, and army officers.

In 1894, Ahmed Rıza joined Ottoman Union, and requested it change its name to Order and Progress to reflect his Positivism. They compromised with Union and Progress. Rıza being based in Paris, the organization was organized around Meşveret and its French supplemental. The CUP became the preeminent faction of the Young Turks once as absorbed other opposition groups and established contact with exiled intelligentsia, Freemasons, and cabinet ministers, to the point where European observers started calling them the "Young Turk Party". The society attempted several coup attempts against the government, much to the anti-revolutionary in Rıza's chagrin.

Due to the danger in speaking out against absolutism, Young Turk activity shifted abroad. Turkish colonies were established in Paris, London, Geneva, Bucharest, and Cairo. The several ideological currents in the moment meant unity was hard to come by. Ahmet Rıza advocated for a Turkish nationalist and secularist agenda. Even though he denounced revolution, he had a more conservative and Islamist rival in Mehmet Murat Bey of Mizan fame. Rıza also had to deal with the "Activist" faction of the CUP that did push for a revolution. Other CUP branches often acted autonomously with their own ideological currents, to the point where the committee resembled more of an umbrella organization. Meşveret (Rıza) called for the reinstatement of the constitution but without revolution, as well as a more centralized Turkish-dominated Ottoman Empire sovereign of European influence.

The CUP supported Kâmil Pasha's call for responsible government to return to the Sublime Porte during the diplomatic crisis caused by the Hamidian massacres. In August 1896, cabinet ministers aligned with the CUP conspired a coup d'état to overthrow the sultan, but the plot was leaked to the palace before its execution. Prominent statesmen were exiled to Ottoman Tripolitania and Acre. The year after, Unionist cadets of the Military Academy schemed to assassinate the Minister of Military Schools, and this plot was also leaked to authorities. In became known as the "Sacrifices of the Şeref" (Şeref Kurbanları) the largest single crackdown of the Hamidian era resulted in more than 630 high-profile arrests and exiles.

Under pressure from Yıldız Palace, French authorities banned Meşveret, though not the French supplemental, and deported Rıza and his Unionists in 1896. After settling in Brussels, the Belgian government was also pressured to deport the group a couple years later. The Belgian parliament denounced the decision and held a demonstration supporting the Young Turks against Hamidian tyranny. A congress in December 1896 saw Murat elected as chairman over Rıza and the headquarters moved to Geneva, sparking a schism between Rıza's supporters in Paris and Murat's supporters in Geneva. After the Ottoman Empire's triumph over Greece in 1897 Sultan Abdul Hamid used the prestige he gained from the victory to coax the exiled Young Turks network back into his fold. After expelling Rıza from the CUP, Murat defected to the government, including Cevdet and Sükuti. A wave of extraditions, more amnesties, and buy-outs, weakened an opposition organization already operating in exile. With trials organized in 1897 and 1899 against enemies of Abdul Hamid II, the Ottoman Empire was under his secure control. Though moral was low, Ahmet Rıza, who returned to Paris, was the sole leader of the exiled Young Turks network.

In 1899, members of the Ottoman dynasty Damat Mahmud Pasha and his sons Sabahaddin and Lütfullah fled to Europe to join the Young Turks. However, Prince Sabahaddin believed that embracing the Anglo-Saxon values of capitalism and liberalism would alleviate the Empire's problems such as separatism from non-Muslim minorities such as the Armenians, alienating himself from the CUP.

=== Schism over foreign intervention ===
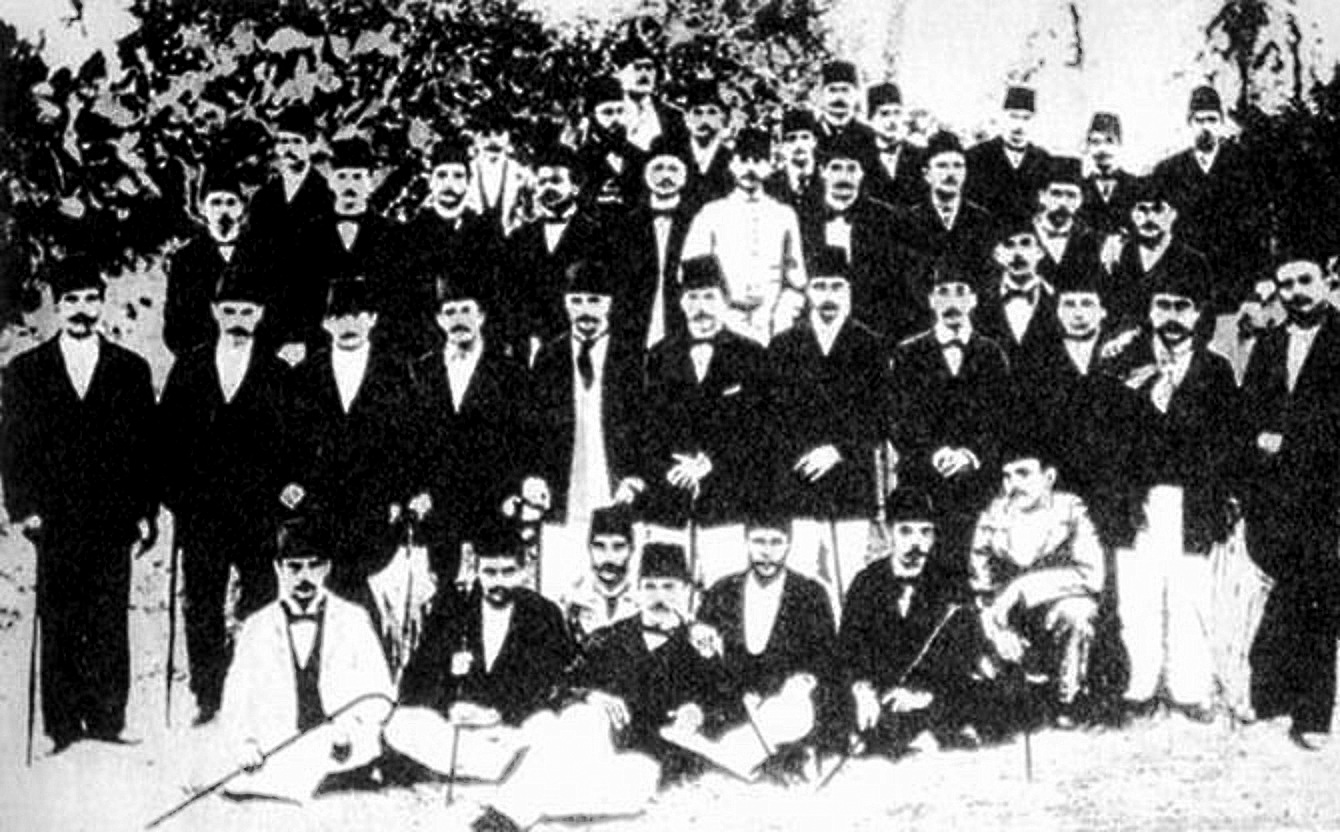
Before the Ottoman opposition congress, which was held in the house of Germain Antoin Lefevre-Pontalis a member of the Institut de France, on 4 February 1902, and was closed to the public, with the participation of 47 delegates the Young Turk Committee

The First Congress of Ottoman Opposition was held on 4 February 1902, at the house of Germain Antoin Lefevre-Pontalis a member of the Institut de France. The opposition was performed in compliance with the French government. Closed to the public, there were 47 delegates present. It included Rıza's Unionists, Sabahaddin's supporters, Armenian Dashnaks and Vergazmiya Hunchaks, and other Greek and Bulgarian groups. It was defined by the question of whether to invite foreign intervention for regime change in Constantinople to better minority rights; a majority which included Sabahaddin and his followers as well as the Armenians argued for foreign intervention, a minority which included Rıza's Unionists and the Activist Unionists were against violent change and especially foreign intervention.

The Ottoman Freedom Lover's Committee, named after the eponymous 1902 congress, was founded by Prince Sabahaddin and Ismail Kemal in the name of the majority mandate. However the organization was contentious and a coup plot in 1903 went nowhere. They later founded the Private Enterprise and Decentralization League, which called for a more decentralized and federalized Ottoman state in opposition to Rıza's centralist vision. After the congress, Rıza formed a coalition with the Activists and founded the Committee of Progress and Union (CPU). This unsuccessful attempt to bridge the divide amongst the Young Turks instead deepened the rivalry between Sabahaddin's group and Rıza's CPU. The 20th century began with Abdul Hamid II's rule secure and his opposition scattered and divided.

Beyond this ideological rift, the Young Turk movement had three main ideological currents on what the state ideology of the Ottoman Empire should be: old-school multicultural Ottomanism, incumbent pan-Islamism, and vogue pan-Turkism. After the revolution, non-Turkish and non-Muslim Young Turks ascribed themselves to their respective nationalist movements. For the Unionists that stayed with the CUP, the question of embracing (Anatolian) Turkism and then Westernization were on the docket.

=== Unionist homecoming in Macedonia ===
The Young Turks became a truly organized movement with the CUP as an organizational umbrella. They recruited individuals hoping for the establishment of a constitutional monarchy in the Ottoman Empire. In 1906, the Ottoman Freedom Society was established in Thessalonica by Mehmed Talaat. The OFS actively recruited members from the Third Army base, among them Major Ismail Enver.

The Second Congress of Ottoman Opposition took place in Paris, France, on 22 December 1907. Opposition leaders including Ahmed Rıza, Sabahaddin Bey, and Khachatur Malumian of the Dashnak Committee were in attendance. The goal was to unite all the Young Turks and minority nationalist movements, in order to bring about a revolution to reinstate the constitution. They decided to put their differences aside and signed an alliance, declaring that Abdul Hamid had to be deposed and the regime replaced with a representative and constitutional government by any means necessary, without foreign interference.

In September 1907, OFS announced they would be working with other organizations under the umbrella of the CUP. In reality, the leadership of the OFS would exert significant control over the CUP. Finally, in 1908 in the Young Turk Revolution, pro-CUP officers marched on Istanbul, forcing Abdulhamid to restore the constitution. An attempted countercoup resulted in his deposition.

=== Young Turk Revolution ===
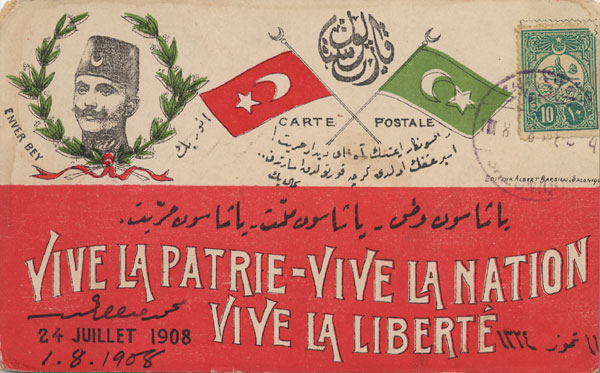
Young Turks flyer with the slogan Long live the fatherland, long live the nation, long live liberty written in Ottoman Turkish and French

In 1908, the Macedonian Question was facing the Ottoman Empire. Tsar Nicholas II and Franz Joseph, who were both interested in the Balkans, started implementing policies, beginning in 1897, which brought on the last stages of the Balkanization process. By 1903, there were discussions on establishing administrative control by Russian and Austrian advisory boards in the Macedonian provinces. Abdul Hamid was forced to accept this reform package, although for quite a while he was able to subvert its implementation.

However, eventually, signs were showing that this policy game was coming to an end. On 13 May 1908, the leadership of the CUP, with the newly gained power of its organization, informed Sultan Abdul Hamid II that "the [Ottoman] dynasty would be in danger" if he were not to bring back the Ottoman constitution that he had previously suspended since 1878. By June, Unionist officers of the Third Army mutinied and threatened to march on Constantinople. Although initially resistant to the idea of giving up absolute power, Abdul Hamid was forced on 24 July 1908 to restore the constitution, beginning the Ottoman Empire's Second Constitutional Era.

=== Aftermath ===
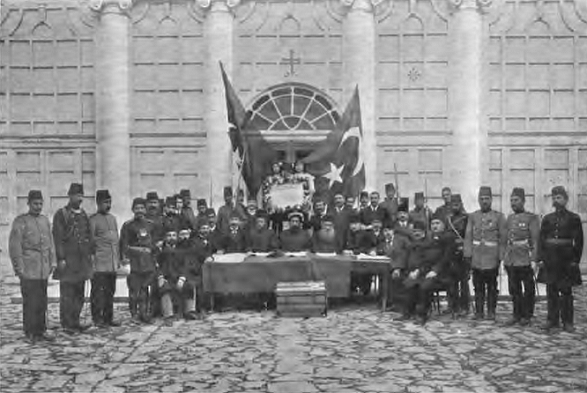
Declaration of the Young Turk Revolution by the leaders of the Ottoman millets in 1908

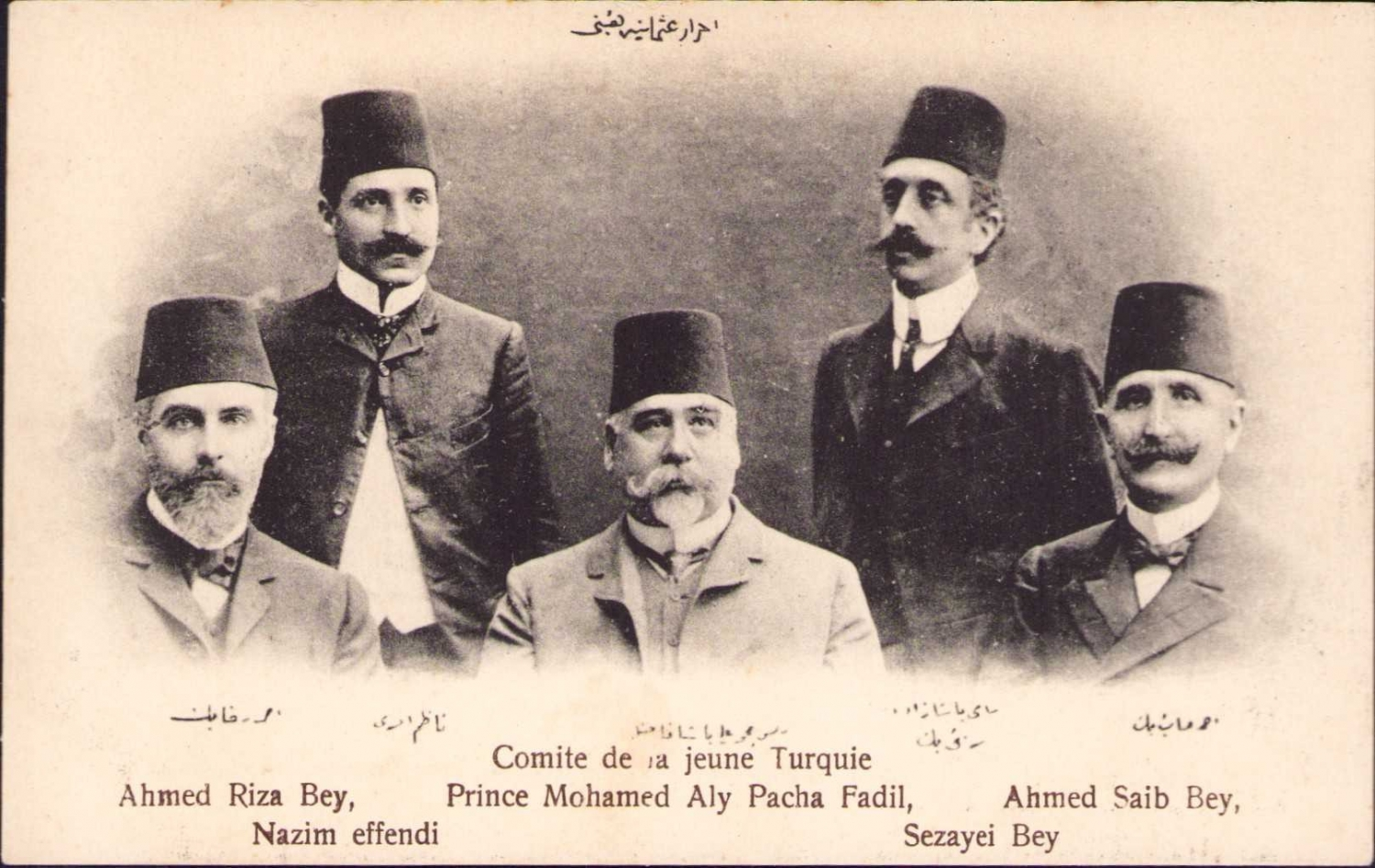
Young Turk (CUP) Committee in 1909

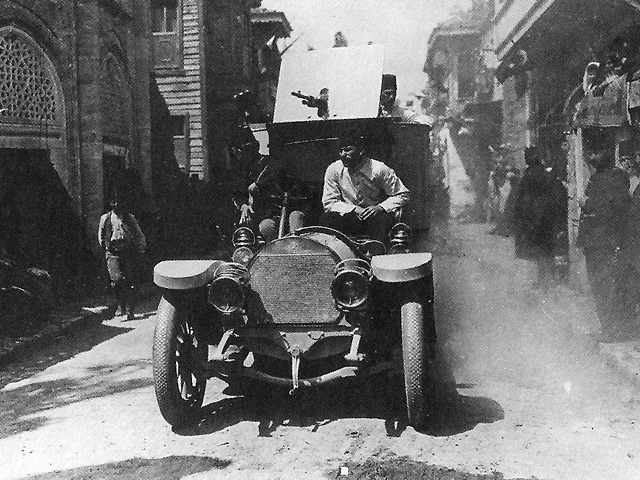
Action Army forces entering Istanbul in 1909

After the revolution, the Young Turks formalized their differences in ideology by forming political clubs. Two main parties formed: more liberal and pro-decentralization Young Turks formed the Liberty Party and later the Freedom and Accord Party. The Turkish nationalist and pro-centralization wing among the Young Turks remained in the CUP. The groups' power struggle continued until 1913, after the CUP took over following Mahmud Shevket Pasha's assassination. They brought the Ottoman Empire into World War I on the side of the Central Powers during the war.

During the parliamentary recess of this era, the Young Turks held their first open congress at Salonica, on September–October 1911. There, they proclaimed a series of policies involving the disarming of Christians and preventing them from buying property, Muslim settlements in Christian territories, and the complete Ottomanization of all Turkish subjects, either by persuasion or by the force of arms. By 1913, the CUP banned all other political parties, creating a one party state. The Ottoman Parliament became a rubber stamp and real policy debate was held within the CUP's Central Committee.

==== World War I ====
On 2 November 1914, the Ottoman Empire entered World War I on the side of the Central Powers. The Middle Eastern theatre of World War I became the scene of action. The combatants were the Ottoman Empire, with some assistance from the other Central Powers, against primarily the British and the Russians among the Allies. Rebuffed elsewhere by the major European powers, the CUP, through highly secret diplomatic negotiations, led the Ottoman Empire to ally itself with Germany.

==== Armenian genocide ====
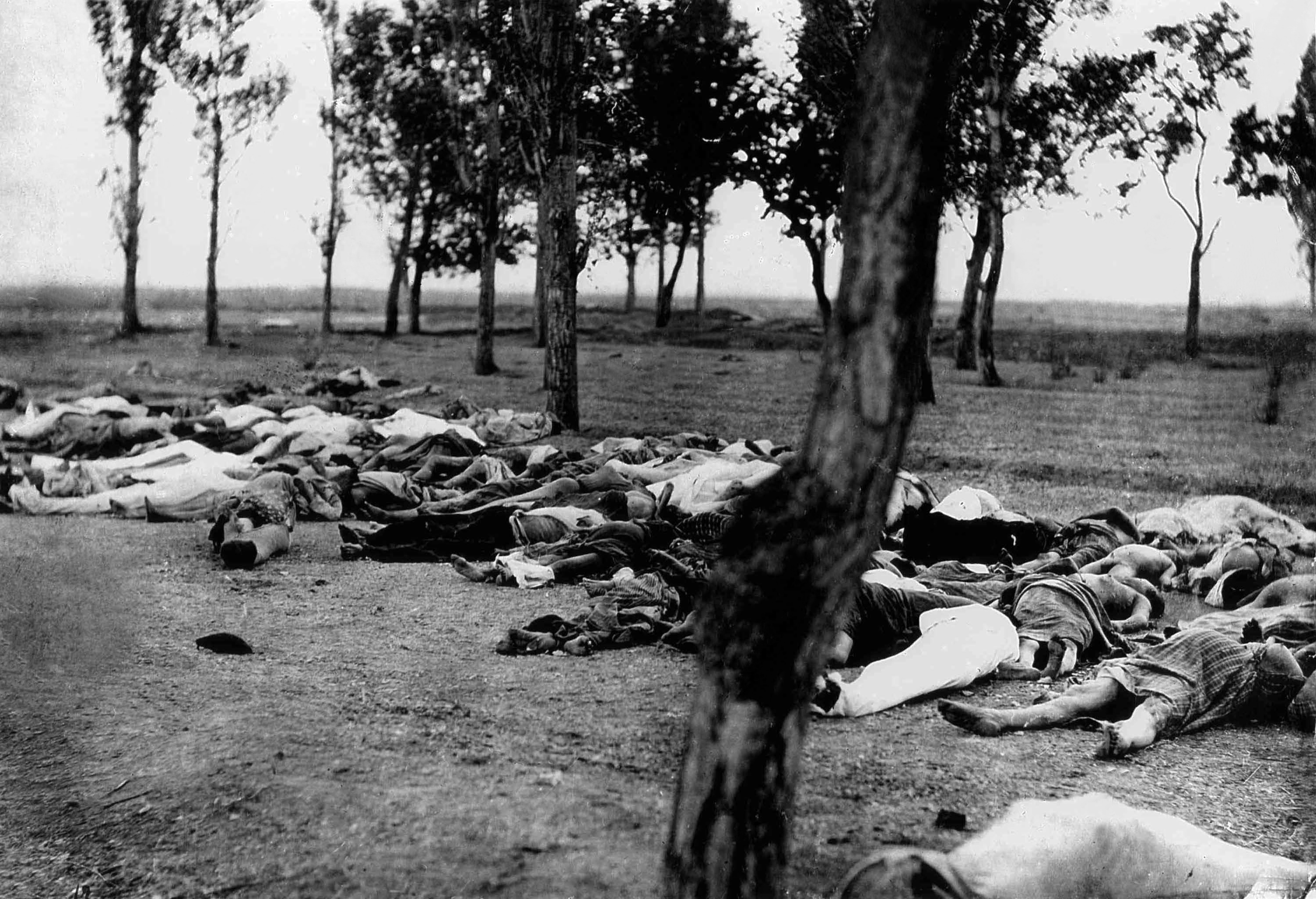
The Armenian genocide was the CUP government's systematic extermination of its Armenian subjects.

The conflicts at the Caucasus Campaign, the Persian Campaign, and the Gallipoli Campaign affected places where Armenians lived in significant numbers. Before the declaration of war, Unionist emissaries asked Ottoman Armenians at the Armenian congress at Erzurum to facilitate the conquest of Transcaucasia by inciting an anti-Tsarist rebellion among the Russian Armenians in the event of a Caucasian Front.

Scholars trace the genocide to long-standing discrimination and land conflicts against Armenians in the Ottoman east, radicalizing after the 1890s massacres and especially the Balkan Wars, when CUP leaders embraced ethnonationalist Turkification and came to see the large Christian minority in Western Armenia as a threat to imperial survival. In World War I, military defeats, paranoia about alleged Armenian rebellion or collusion with Russia, and the goal of demographic engineering and economic plunder led Young Turk leaders to portray Armenians as collectively guilty (a fifth column) and to order mass deportations and annihilation to prevent Armenian autonomy or independence.

Around 300,000 Armenians were forced to move southwards to Urfa and then westwards to Aintab and Marash. In the summer of 1917, Armenians were moved to the Konya region in central Anatolia. By the end of World War I, up to 1,200,000 Armenians were forcibly deported from their home vilayets. About half of the displaced died of exposure, hunger, and disease, or were victims of banditry and forced labour.

In 2005, the International Association of Genocide Scholars stated that scholarly evidence revealed the CUP "government of the Ottoman Empire began a systematic genocide of its Armenian citizens and unarmed Christian minority population. More than a million Armenians were exterminated through direct killing, starvation, torture, and forced death marches."

==== Assyrian genocide ====
The genocide of Assyrian civilians began during the Ottoman occupation of Azerbaijan from January to May 1915, during which massacres were committed by Ottoman forces and pro-Ottoman Kurds. Previously, many Assyrians were killed in the 1895 massacres of Diyarbekir. However the violence worsened after the 1908 Young Turk Revolution, despite Assyrian hopes that the new government would stop promoting anti-Christian Islamism.

The Sayfo occurred concurrently with and was closely related to the Armenian genocide. Motives for killing included a perceived lack of loyalty among some Assyrian communities to the Ottoman Empire and the desire to appropriate their land. At the 1919 Paris Peace Conference, the Assyro-Chaldean delegation said that its losses were 250,000 (about half the prewar population); they later revised their estimate to 275,000 dead at the Lausanne Conference of 1922–1923.

==== Turkish War of Independence ====
At the end of the War, with the collapse of Bulgaria and Germany's capitulation, Talaat Pasha and the CUP ministry resigned on 13 October 1918, and the Armistice of Mudros was signed aboard a British battleship in the Aegean Sea. On 2 November, Enver, Talaat and Cemal fled from Istanbul into exile. Following the war, the Freedom and Accord Party regained control over the Ottoman government and conducting a purge of Unionists. Freedom and Accord rule was short-lived, and with Mustafa Kemal Pasha (Atatürk) stirring up nationalist sentiment in Anatolia, the Empire soon collapsed.

== Ideology ==
=== Materialism and positivism ===
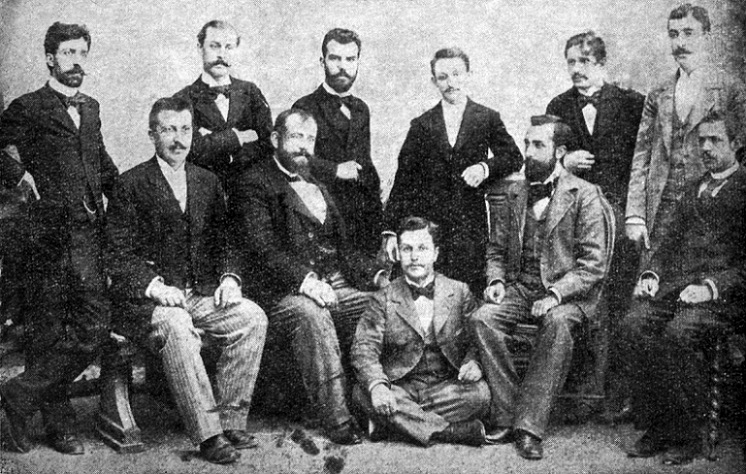
Members of the Young Turks: İshak Sükuti, Serâceddin Bey, Tunalı Hilmi, Âkil Muhtar, Mithat Şükrü, Emin Bey, Lutfi Bey, Doctor Şefik Bey, Nûri Ahmed, Doctor Reshid and Münif Bey

A guiding principle for the Young Turks was the transformation of their society into one in which religion played no consequential role, a stark contrast from the theocracy that had ruled the Ottoman Empire since its inception. However, the Young Turks soon recognized the difficulty of spreading this idea among the deeply religious Ottoman peasantry and even much of the elite. The Young Turks thus began suggesting that Islam itself was materialistic. As compared with later efforts by Muslim intellectuals, such as the attempt to reconcile Islam and socialism, this was an extremely difficult endeavour. Although some former members of the CUP continued to make efforts in this field after the revolution of 1908, they were severely denounced by the ulema, who accused them of "trying to change Islam into another form and create a new religion while calling it Islam".

Positivism, with its claim of being a religion of science, deeply impressed the Young Turks, who believed it could be more easily reconciled with Islam than could popular materialistic theories. The name of the society, Committee of Union and Progress, was inspired by leading positivist Auguste Comte's motto Order and Progress. Positivism also served as a base for the desired strong government.

=== Centralized government ===
After the CUP took power in the 1913 coup and Mahmud Şevket Pasha's assassination, it embarked on a series of reforms in order to increase centralization in the Empire, an effort that had been ongoing since the last century's Tanzimat reforms under sultan Mahmud II. Many of the original Young Turks rejected this idea, especially those that had formed the Freedom and Accord Party against the CUP. Other opposition parties against the CUP like Prince Sabahaddin's Private Enterprise and Decentralization League and the Arab Ottoman Party for Administrative Decentralization, both of which made opposition to the CUP's centralization their main agenda.

The Young Turks wished to modernize the Empire's communications and transportation networks without putting themselves in the hands of European bankers. Europeans already owned much of the country's railroad system, and since 1881, the administration of the defaulted Ottoman foreign debt had been in European hands. During the World War I, the empire under the CUP was "virtually an economic colony on the verge of total collapse."

=== Nationalism ===
Regarding nationalism, the Young Turks underwent a gradual transformation. Beginning with the Tanzimat with ethnically non-Turkish members participating at the outset, the Young Turks embraced the official state ideology: Ottomanism. However, many ethnically non-Turkish Ottoman intellectuals rejected the idea because of its exclusive use of Turkish symbols and certain elements within the Young Turk movement promoted Muslim supremacy. Turkish nationalists gradually gained the upper hand in politics, and following the 1902 Congress, a stronger focus on nationalism developed. It was at this time that Ahmed Rıza chose to replace the term "Ottoman" with "Turk," shifting the focus from Ottoman nationalism to Turkish nationalism.

== Prominent Young Turks ==
Among the prominent leaders and ideologists were:

- Pamphleteers and activists
  - Tunalı Hilmi
  - Yusuf Akçura, a Tatar journalist with a secular national ideology, who was against Ottomanism and supported separation of church and state
  - Ayetullah Bey
  - Osman Hamdi Bey, an Ottoman-Greek painter and owner of the first specialized art school in Istanbul (founded 1883)
  - Emmanuel Carasso Efendi, a lawyer and a member of the prominent Sephardic Jewish Carasso family
  - Mehmet Cavit Bey, a Dönmeh from Thessalonica, who was Minister of Finance; he was hanged for treason in 1926.
  - Abdullah Cevdet, a Kurdish intellectual who is a supporter of biological materialism and secularism
  - Marcel Samuel Raphael Cohen (aka Tekin Alp), born to a Jewish family in Salonica under Ottoman control (now Thessaloniki, Greece), became one of the founding fathers of Turkish nationalism and an ideologue of Pan-Turkism.
  - Agah Efendi, founded the first Turkish newspaper and, as postmaster, brought the postage stamp to the Ottoman Empire (although he died in 1885, he was honored for founding the first Turkish newspaper).
  - Ziya Gökalp, a Turkish nationalist from Diyarbakir, publicist and sociologist, influenced by modern Western European culture
  - Talaat Pasha, whose role before the revolution is not clear
  - Ahmed Riza, worked to improve the condition of the Ottoman peasantry; he served as an education independent.
- Military officers
  - Ahmed Niyazi Bey, initiator and a leader of the Young Turk Revolution
  - Enver Pasha, a leader of the Young Turk Revolution and later prominent Young Turk politician
  - Eyüp Sabri, a leader of the Young Turk Revolution
  - Bekir Fikri, a prominent participant in the Young Turk Revolution
  - Atıf Kamçıl, a prominent participant in the Young Turk Revolution
  - Subhi Bey Abaza (lived in Sidon)
  - Reşat Bey

== Aftermath and legacy ==
In the aftermath of an assassination attempt by remaining Unionists, Mustafa Kemal Atatürk, is quoted on the front page of the 1 August 1926 The Los Angeles Examiner as denouncing the Young Turks and especially the CUP (the "Young Turk Party"):

These left-overs from the former [Committee of Union and Progress] Young Turk Party, who should have been made to account for the millions of our Christian subjects who were ruthlessly driven en masse from their homes and massacred, have been restive under the Republican rule. […] They have hitherto lived on plunder, robbery and bribery and become inimical to any idea, or suggestion to enlist in useful labor and earn their living by the honest sweat of their brow… Under the cloak of the [Progressive Republican Party] opposition party, this element, who forced our country into the Great War against the will of the people, who caused the shedding of rivers of blood of the Turkish youth to satisfy the criminal ambition of Enver Pasha, has, in a cowardly fashion, intrigued against my life, as well as the lives of the members of my cabinet.

Historian Uğur Ümit Üngör, in his book The Making of Modern Turkey: Nation and State in Eastern Anatolia, has claimed that the "Republican People's Party, which was founded by Mustafa Kemal, was the successor of CUP and continued ethnic cleansing policies of its predecessor in Eastern Anatolia until the year 1950. Thus, Turkey was transformed into an ethnically homogenous state."

As to the fate of the Three Pashas, two of them, Talaat Pasha and Cemal Pasha, were assassinated by Armenian nationals shortly after the end of World War I while in exile in Europe during Operation Nemesis, a revenge operation against perpetrators of the Armenian genocide. Soghomon Tehlirian, whose family was killed in the Armenian genocide, assassinated the exiled Talaat Pasha in Berlin and was subsequently acquitted on all charges by a German jury. Cemal Pasha was similarly killed by Stepan Dzaghikian, Bedros Der Boghosian, and Ardashes Kevorkian for "crimes against humanity" in Tbilisi, Georgia. Enver Pasha, was killed in fighting against the Red Army unit under the command of Hakob Melkumian near Baldzhuan in Tajikistan (then Turkistan).

== List of Young Turk organizations ==
The following is a list of opposition groups founded until the Young Turk Revolution.

- Le Parti Constitutionnel en Turquie
- Comité Turco-Syrien
- Ottoman Union Society [İttihad-ı Osmanî Cemiyeti]
- Committee of Union and Progress [İttihad ve Terraki Cemiyeti]
- Society of the Ulema [Cemiyet-i İlmiye]
- Vatanperverân-ı İslâmiye Cemiyeti
- Comité d'Action Ottoman
- Comité du Parti Constitutionnel Ottoman à Constantinople
- Committee of Avenging Young Ottomans [İntikamcı Yeni Osmanlılar Cemiyeti]
- Lâ İlâhe İllallah
- Ottoman Revolutionary Party [Osmanlı İhtilâl Fırkası]
- Parti de la Jeune Turquie
- Party of the Ottoman Liberals [Serbest Osmanlılar Fırkası]
- Patriotic Muslim's Association [Vatanperverân-ı İslâmiye Cemiyeti]
- Progress of Islamic Education Society [Terakki-i Maarif-i İslâmiye Cemiyeti]
- Restitution Committee [İstirdat Cemiyeti]
- Reşadiye Committee
- Society for Education [Tahsil Cemiyeti]
- Ottoman Freedom Lovers' Committee [Comité Libéral Ottoman, Osmanlı Hürriyetperverân Cemiyeti]
- Dawn of Ottoman Union Committee [Şafak Osmanlı İttihad Cemiyeti]
- Society of People Loyal to the Nation [Fedakârân-ı Millet Cemiyeti]
- Party Constitutionnel Ottoman
- Islamic Benevolence Society [Cemiyet-i Hayriye-i İslâmiye)
- Lights of the East [Envâr-ı Şarkiye]
- Neutral Young Ottomans [Bîtiraf Yeni Osmanlılar]
- New Association for Ottomans [Cemiyet-i Cedide-i Osmaniye]
- Ottoman Committee for the Future of the Fatherland and Nation [İstikbâl-i Vatan ve Millet Cemiyet-i Osmaniyesi]
- Ottoman Union and Action Branch [Osmanlı İttihad ve İcraat Şubesi]
- Private Initiative and Decentralization League [Teşebbüs-i Şahsi ve Adem-i Merkeziyet Cemiyeti]
- Motherland and Liberty Committee [Vatan ve Hürriyet Cemiyeti]
- Ottoman Freedom Society [Osmanlı Hürriyet Cemiyeti]

== See also ==
- Sociology in Turkey
- Servet-i Fünun
