= Tunalı Hilmi =

Ottoman politician, prominent Young Turk, and member of parliament (1871–1928)

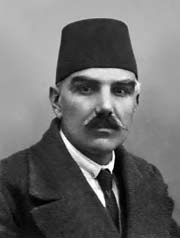
- Born: 28 August 1871; Eski Cuma, Ottoman Empire
- Died: 26 July 1928 (aged 56); Ankara, Turkey
- Occupations: Diplomat; Writer

Abdullah Hilmi Tunalı (28 August 1871 – 26 July 1928) was a Turkish politician, member of the Chamber of Deputies, and later member of the Grand National Assembly of Turkey during the 1st, 2nd, and 3rd terms.

He was a politician and statesman who was among the leading figures of the Young Turks and Pan-Turkism movements. He was a reformist who, during his parliamentary terms, proposed progressive bills and motions that were the source of future reforms by Atatürk. In addition to his advocacy of the use of pure Turkish, he advocated the rights of women, peasants and workers.

== Life ==
He was born in 1871 in Eski Cuma, today in Bulgaria. His mother was Rukiye Hanım, from the Hacıabdullah family, and his father was İsmail Efendi, a tobacco factory owner and reji tobacco expert, from the Kantacıoğulları family. He migrated to Istanbul with his family due to the Russo-Turkish War (1877–1878).

=== His time in education ===
After completing his primary and secondary education in different parts of Anatolia due to the duty of his father, who was the "provincial certificate authority", he graduated from Fatih Military High School and enrolled in Kuleli Military Medical High School. In this period, when secret societies against Abdul Hamid II's administration were intensified, he published the weekly newspaper "Teşvik" in handwriting and wrote articles against the administration. Although a journal gave him away, no evidence was found against him and no action was taken against him because he burned the newspapers.

He continued his education at Gülhane Training and Research Hospital (formerly known as Gülhane Military Academy of Medicine). In this school, he founded the Mektepliler Cemiyet-i Hafiyesi, which later merged with the Committee of Union and Progress. At the time, he was arrested for sending money to Ahmet Verdani, who was in Paris; He was released from prison after being pardoned.

Some members went into exile when the decision of exiling the leaders of the Union of Osmanli was taken in 1895, of which Hilmi was a member; Some of them did not comply with this decision and fled abroad. Tunalı Hilmi, who was in the last year of medicine, fled the country and settled in Geneva, Switzerland in 1895.

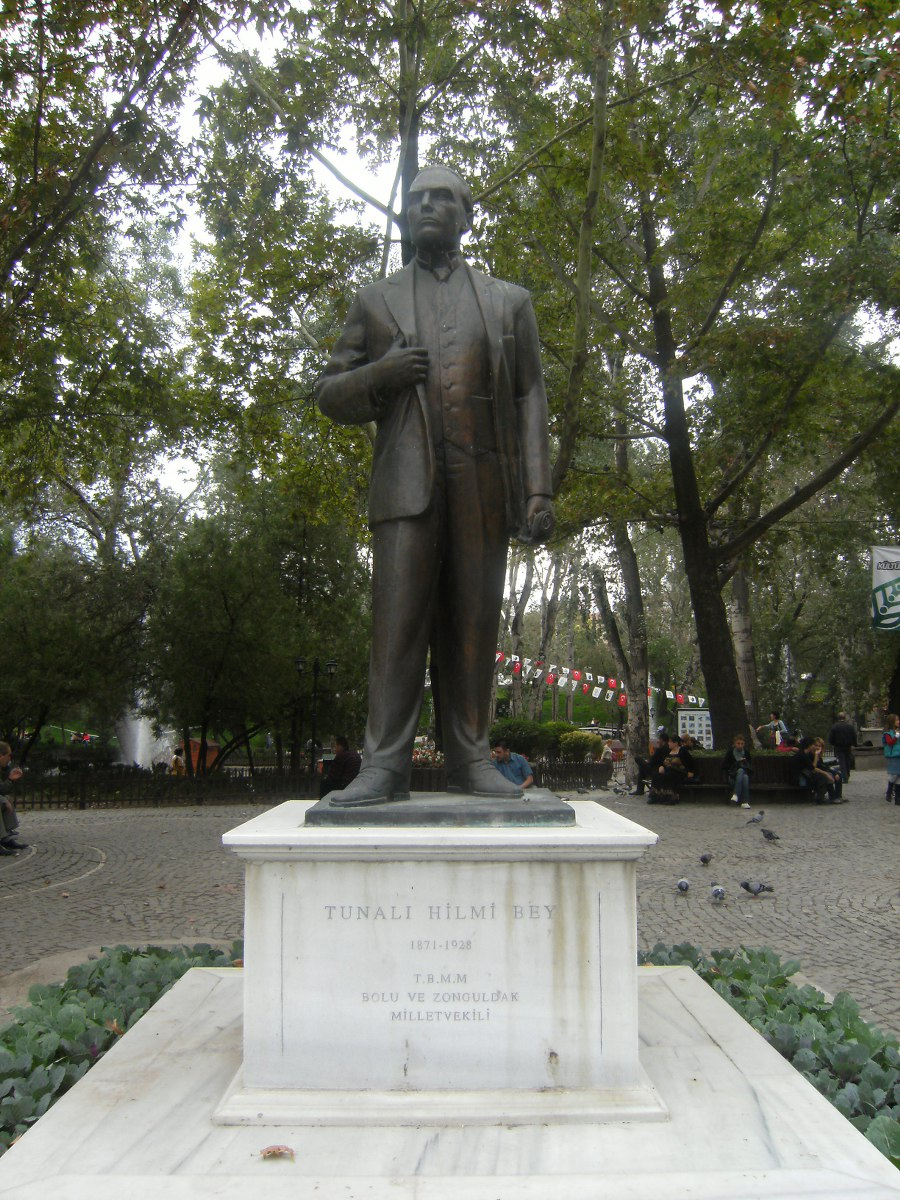
Tunalı Hilmi Street, Tunalı Hilmi Bey statue in Kuğulu Park, Ankara

=== Life in Geneva ===
Tunalı Hilmi, whose medical education was left unfinished, continued his education in the pedagogy department of the University of Geneva. During this period, the "İttihad-i Osmani Cemiyeti" in Istanbul and the Young Turks in Europe were united under the name Committee of Union and Progress. Tunalı Hilmi established the Geneva branch of the Society.

Mizancı Murat, who was elected president at the extraordinary meeting of the Committee of Union and Progress in 1896, moved the center of the movement to Geneva in 1897. Tunalı Hilmi wrote regular articles for Mizan newspaper, published by Mizancı Murat, and Meşveret magazine, published by Ahmed Rıza Bey, who directed the Paris branch; He published brochures called Khutbe explaining the aims and objectives of the Young Turks. He also founded the "Ottoman Student Association" to help Turkish students studying in Europe and published a guidebook called "Education in Europe".

Ahmet Celalettin Pasha, appointed by the Sultan, travelled to Geneva in 1896 and called on the Young Turks to return to Istanbul and remained loyal to the Abdul Hamid II. Tunalı Hilmi, who accepted the Pasha's offer to buy the Khutbe booklets and newspapers, continued his work with the money he received and in 1896 he established the "Ottoman Revolution Party", a special branch within the Committee of Union and Progress.

The work of the Ottoman Revolution Party, which was in favor of fighting against armed action, accelerated the formation of new organizations in Young Turk circles. When these organizations emerged as a result of a denunciation in 1897, Sultan Abdul Hamid II, who exiled 78 Young Turks from Istanbul to Tripoli, sent Celalettin Pasha back to Geneva to meet with the Young Turks in Europe. This time, the President of the Association, [izancı Murat, was convinced to resign from the society and return to Istanbul. Tunalı Hilmi, who assumed the general secretariat of the society upon Mizancı Murat's resignation, convinced the Pasha that he had nothing to do with these organizations and took the money left from the sale of the Khutbe; With this money, he published the "Ottoman Newspaper" on January 1, 1897. In this newspaper, which he published together with İshak Sükûti and Abdullah Cevdet, pan-Turkist, nationalist and republican ideas were included. Although Abdul Hamid II sent the Paris ambassador Münir Pasha this time to discuss stopping the broadcasts against the administration, Hilmi Bey refused to meet.

=== Pressures on his family ===
To break the resistance of Hilmi Bey, his father, İsmail Efendi, was arrested and died in 1899 in Mosul, where he was exiled. One of his brothers, Faik Bey, was expelled from the military and also exiled. His other brother, Şükrü Bey, was exiled first to Baghdad and then to Basra, where he died in poverty. His older brother, Fehmi Bey, fled first to Bulgaria and then to the US to escape the oppression; After working as a worker on the New York City-Chicago railway line for a while, he returned to Bulgaria.

=== Young Turk Congress initiative ===
Tunalı Hilmi, who grew even more resentful towards the Ottoman state due to how his family was being treated, went to Egypt as an inspector of the Committee of Union and Progress in 1898 and organized the Cairo branch of the society, where he also published a newspaper called Hak. He brought forward the idea of organizing a congress within the society and returned to Paris in 1900 for preparations; He started to republish the Khutbe booklets. The congress initiative was inconclusive as it was not accepted by the Young Turk dignitaries.

=== Life in Madrid ===
Most of the Young Turks had reconciled with the Ottoman state in 1899. In the face of this situation, Tunalı Hilmi Bey and his friends decided to make a contract deal with Abdul Hamid II to finance their movements. They agreed to take part in state duties in exchange for the suspension of the publication of the Ottoman Newspaper. After İshak Sükûti was appointed as a doctor to the embassy of the state in Rome and Abdullah Cevdet in Vienna; Hilmi himself was appointed as the clerk of the Madrid ambassador (1900).

During his service, he supported Ali Fahri (Agababa) Bey for the establishment of the "Revengeful New Ottomans Society" and the publication of a newspaper called "İntikam". He went to Athens and Geneva and tried to assassinate the people who caused the arrest of the members of the society and to have his sermons published in Geneva. When his activities were learned by the administration, he was dismissed from his post at the embassy.

Together with Ali Fahri Bey, he organized the meeting of the First Young Turk Congress on 4 February 1902 in Paris. After the First Young Turk congress, when the Committee of Union and Progress was split into two, he no longer took an active role in the society.

=== Life in Egypt ===
In 1904 he went to Egypt and worked in Muhtelit (Karma) court, wrote for Kanun-ı Esasi magazine and Hak newspaper. He was busy writing new works.

=== Second Constitutional Monarchy and return to Istanbul ===
Hilmi Bey, after Abdul Hamid II was deposed, returned to his homeland; He met with his surviving brothers in Istanbul. His articles were published in various publications, especially İnkılâp.

Until 1916, he served as the district governor in Karadeniz Ereğli, Silivri, Bayburt, Ordu, Beykoz and Gemlik; then he was tasked with supervising and regulating the situation of those who immigrated and took refuge in the country in World War I. He continued this duty until 1919.

=== Member of Parliament in the Chamber of Deputies ===
In the elections held in 1919, he entered the Last Ottoman Parliament as the Member of Parliament for Bolu. In 1920, when Istanbul was occupied by the Allied Forces and the parliament became inoperable, he moved to Anatolia and joined Mustafa Kemal Atatürk in his Turkish War of Independence.

=== Member of Parliament in the Grand National Assembly ===
He joined the Turkish Grand National Assembly as a member of parliament from Bolu. He took part in the suppression of the Düzce Uprising and in the organization of the resistance against the French who wanted to occupy Karadeniz Ereğli. He was in the preparatory commission of the Turkish Constitution (1921).

Hilmi Bey, who was a follower of the uprising, submitted many questions to give the social and legal rights of the workers, especially the Ereğli mine workers and to improve the working conditions, re-entered the parliament as Member of Parliament for Zonguldak in the 1923 and 1927 elections.

Tunalı Hilmi stated that he wanted to see a female Pasha and grant women the right to vote and be elected from the parliamentary rostrum in 1923, even though he received negative reactions from the parliament. Hilmi also drew attention to the clarification and importance of the Turkish language many times both in the parliamentary chair and in his writings. Although most of the law proposals and proposals he brought were not accepted because they brought innovations far ahead of the period in which he lived, they were the source of Atatürk's reforms to be made later.

=== Personal life and death ===
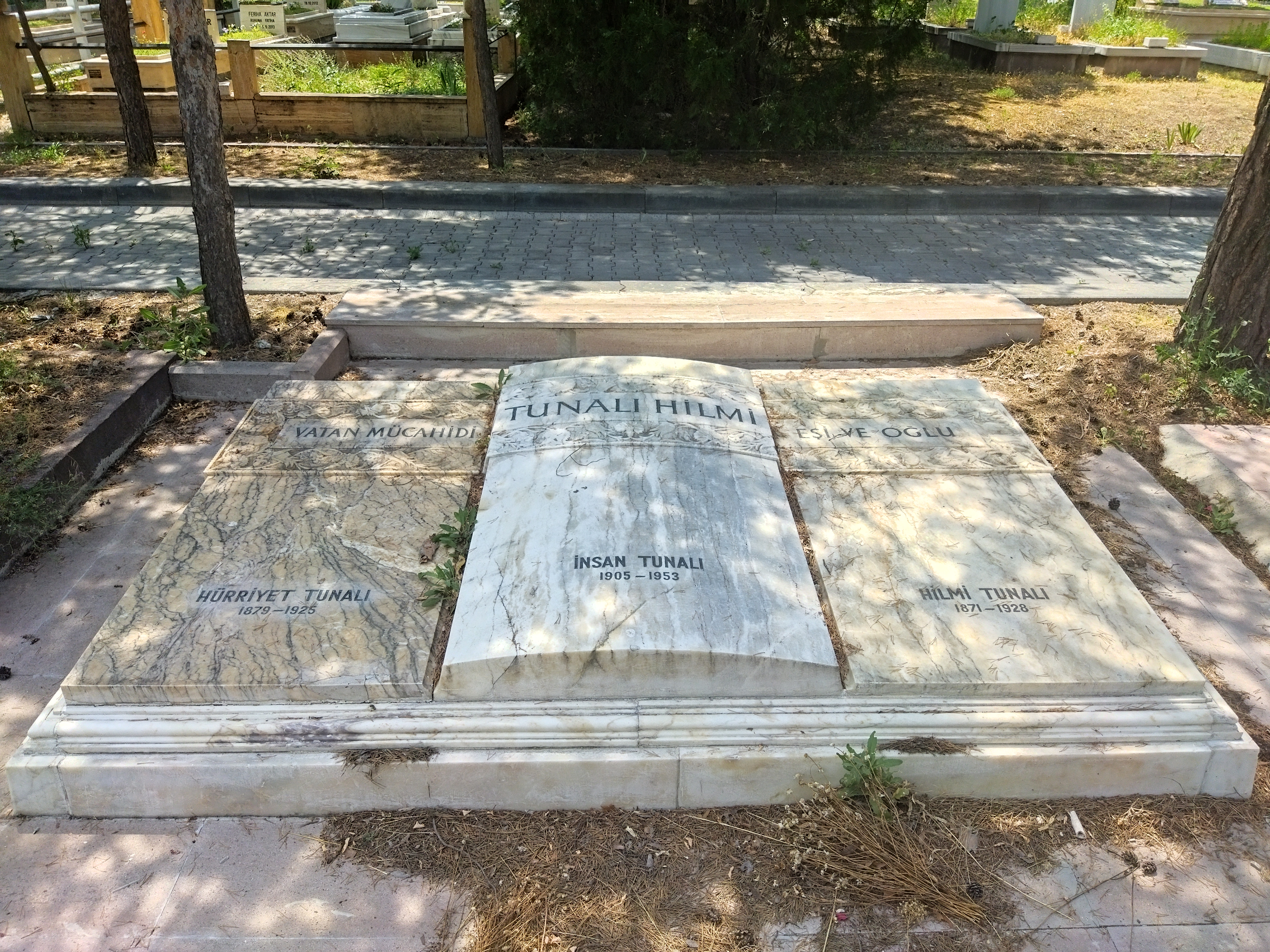
Grave of Tunalı Hilmi in Cebeci Asri Cemetery, Ankara

Hilmi Bey married a Swiss woman named Juliette and had a daughter named Sevda (1902–1958) and a son named Insan were born from this marriage.

Hilmi Bey, who fell ill with tuberculosis in 1928 and was hospitalized in Istanbul Şişli Etfal Hospital, died in Istanbul on July 26, 1928, after a few months of inconclusive treatment. His body, which was buried in Maçka Cemetery in Istanbul, was later brought to Ankara and buried in Cebeci Asri Cemetery.

=== Works ===
- Un projet d'organisation de la souverainete du peuple en Turqie (Türkiye'de halk hakimliği(düzen) Bir şart-Bir dilek, 1904) adıyla yayımladığı ayrıntılı anayasaya tasarısı. (Bu çalışması Fransızcasından çevrilerek Tarih ve Toplum dergisinde "Tunalı Hilmi'nin Halk Hakimiyeti Risalesi ve Anayasa Tasarısı" adı altında yayımlandı.(Mart 1984, sayı 3) )
- Evvel ve Ahir
- Makedonya Mazisi
- Hâl
- İstikbal(1898)
- Peşte'de Reşid Efendi (1899)
- Rezalet yine İspanya'da (1900)
- Kongre, Cevapları-Cevabımız(1901)
- Kongre Nedir, Nasıl Olmalıdır?(1901)
- Bir Dilek (1902)
- Memiş Çavuş Büyük Millet Meclisinde (1923)
