= Ubeydullah =

Ubeydullah is the Turkish spelling of the common Muslim given name Ubayd Allah (Arabic: عبيد الله) and specifically may refer to:

== People ==
- Ubeydullah Bey (1858–1937), Ottoman politician
- Abdulkadir Ubeydullah (1851–1925), Kurdish politicians
- Sheikh Ubeydullah, Kurdish politicians

== Other uses ==
- Uprising of Sheikh Ubeydullah
