= Abdullah Cevdet =

Turkish intellectual and physician (1869-1932)

Dr. Abdullah Cevdet
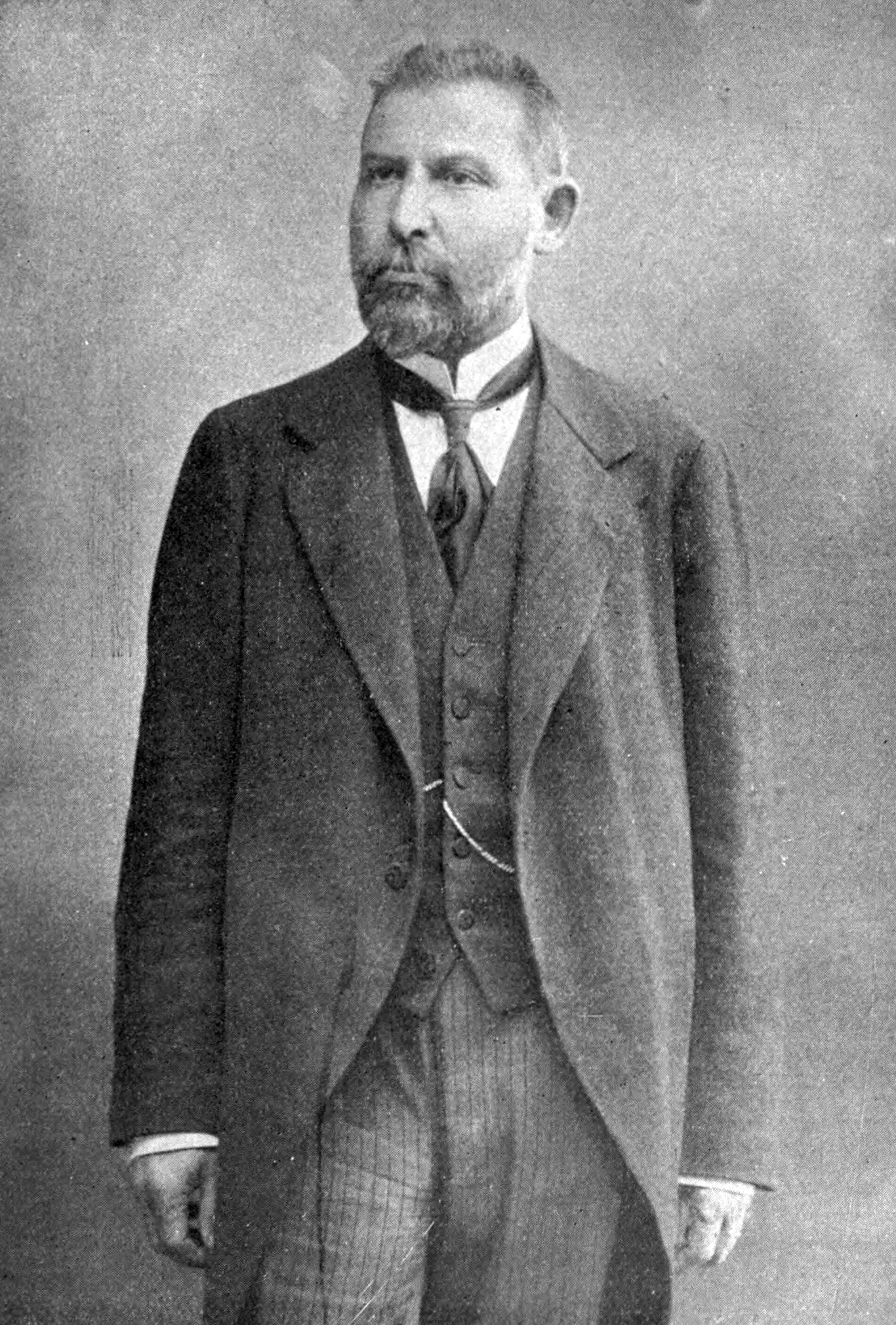
- Born: 9 September 1869; Arapgir, Malatya, Ottoman Empire
- Died: 29 November 1932 (aged 63); Istanbul, Turkey
- Resting place: Merkezefendi Cemetery, Istanbul
- Citizenship: Ottoman, Turkey
- Education: Turkish Military Academy Imperial School of Medicine
- Occupations: Physician, writer and intellectual
- Political party: Committee of Union and Progress (1889–1908); Democratic Party (1908–1911)
- Children: 2

Abdullah Cevdet Bey (9 September 1869 – 29 November 1932) was a Kurdish-Turk intellectual, activist, poet, essayist, and physician. A Young Turk, he was one of the founders of the Committee of Union and Progress (CUP) and wrote articles with pen name of "Bir Kürd" ("A Kurd") for the publications such as Meşveret, Kurdistan and Roji Kurd about the East–West dichotomy and Kurdish awakening and nationalism. In his personal publication İctihad he pushed for the Westernization of society, feminism, workers rights, liberty, science, secularism, and social liberalism. He was an ideologue of the CUP until 1902, when he became an opponent of the organization he founded as it embraced Turkish nationalism. In 1908, he established the Democratic Party, which merged with the Freedom and Accord Party in 1911. He was briefly active in support of Kurdish independence in the early 1920s before supporting Mustafa Kemal Atatürk's Turkish National Movement.

Cevdet's literary career was defined by his antagonistic relationship with religious conservatives and constant press censorship. Due to his critical historical essays on Islam and Muhammad, he was taken to court several times over charges of blasphemy. He introduced to the Ottoman public Charles Darwin's theory of evolution and the Bahá'í Faith. Several of Cevdet's ideas, by Atatürk's own admission, came to fruition as part of his reforms such as secularism, the shuttering of madrases, and the furthering of women's rights.

== Biography ==
=== Early life ===
Abdullah Cevdet was born on 9 September 1869 (or 1867) in Arapgir, Malatya. He was born to a family of Kurdish origin. He would always describe himself as a Turk of Kurdish origin. His father was Hacı Ömer Vasfi Efendi, a clerk of the first battalion in Diyarbakır. After completing his primary education in Hozat and Arapgir, he went to Harput with his family. He graduated from Ma‘mûretülazîz (Elâzığ) Military Junior High School in 1885. At the age of fifteen, he went to Istanbul to attend the Kuleli Military Medical Preparatory School. He graduated three years later and continued his education in the Imperial School of Medicine.

Cevdet was initially a pious Muslim and received a religious education, but was influenced by Western materialistic philosophies which turned him against institutionalized religion. He thought that "although the Muslim God was of no use in the modern era, Islamic society must preserve Islamic principles".

=== Years in Medical School ===
During his student years in the Imperial School of Medicine, he was influenced by biological materialism, the ideology which dominated the school. He translated a section of Ludwig Büchner’s work Kraft und Stoff, which greatly influenced him, under the title Fizyolociya-i Tefekkür (1890) "Physiology of Contemplation". In the same year, he published Dimâğ ("The Brain") on brain functions. In 1890 he prepared the first draft of his work Fünûn ve Felsefe ("Science and Philosophy"), which attempted to reconcile the ideas of Islamic scholars and biological materialist philosophers. Cevdet published two more books on biological materialism and brain functions, Fizyolociya ve Hıfz-ı Sıhhat-i Dimâğ ("Physiology and the Preservation of Mental Health") and Melekât-ı Akliyye ("The Angels of Reason") in his last year at school, and wrote articles on the same subjects in the magazines Maârif, Musavver Cihan and Resimli Kitab.

As Cevdet developed his political beliefs, he identified with the Young Ottomans before him, especially Ali Suavi. On 3 June 1889, he and three of his friends: İbrahim Timo, İshak Sükûti, Mehmed Reşid, founded the Ottoman Union Committee. This society later became the Committee of Union and Progress. The overall goal of Young Turks such as Cevdet was to bring to end the absolutist regime of Sultan Abdul Hamid II. He was arrested several times during his education due to his political activities and was expelled from school for a while. While in medical school he joined the literature scene, and upon the request of Abdülhak Hâmid, he compiled his poems into a book. In these early works published under the name of Ömer Cevdet, the influences of Namık Kemal, Recaizade Mahmud Ekrem, Hâmid and Halid Ziya can be felt. After his first poetry book Hiç, published in 1890, he also published the poetry books Tuluat (1891) and Masumiyet (1893).

He eventually completed his medical education in July 1894 and became an ophthalmologist. After finishing school, he practiced in Haydarpaşa Numune Hospital in Istanbul. He was sent to Diyarbakır on a temporary duty in November of the same year due to a cholera epidemic, on the side organizing among those in the city to establish a CUP branch there. He saved Ziya Gökalp from his suicide attempt and initiated him into the CUP. He also took the opportunity to translate Büchner’s Natur und Geist under the pen name Goril.

=== As an activist ===
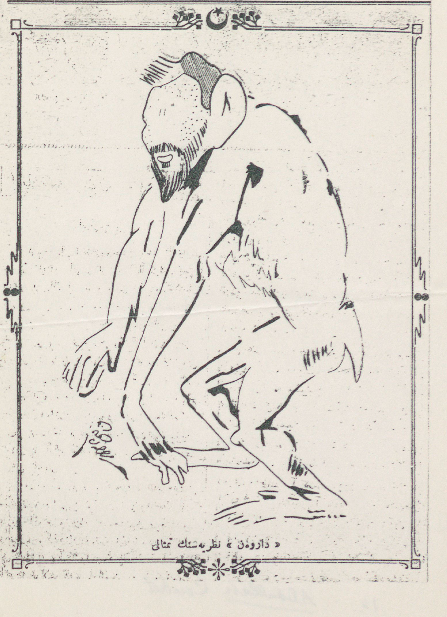
A cartoon by Abdullah Cevdet "Representative of the Darwin theory"

When he returned to Istanbul in 1895, he was arrested on charges of subversion and he was assigned to the ophthalmology department of the Tripoli (of Libya) Central Hospital, which was essentially an exile. However, he continued his work on behalf of the CUP there. After serving one and a half years, he was again imprisoned. When he was released four months later, he learned that he was to be deported to Fezzan, so he fled to France via Tunisia 1897. He was sentenced to life imprisonment in absentia for this.

He arrived in Paris in the aftermath of the Mizancı Murad affair, when Murat Bey overthrew Ahmed Rıza as CUP leader, but subsequently returned to the Ottoman Empire after striking a deal with Sultan Abdul Hamid's top intelligence officer Ahmed Celâleddin Pasha. Cevdet went to Geneva and met with Young Turks such as Tunalı Hilmi and Dr. Mehmed Reşit and became close with Ahmed Rıza. Cevdet and Ibrahim Temo would soon cut their ties with the CUP after 1902, as the organization began to advocate a Turkist nationalist policy. For now though, together with İshak Sükûti in Geneva, he published the Osmanlı newspaper, a new CUP organ, in Turkish and French, and wrote articles denouncing autocracy. Plekhanov, Axelrod, and Lenin were also in Geneva at the same time and were busy publishing Iskra. He translated Western works; among the works he translated was Friedrich Schiller's drama William Tell. He later published the preface he wrote for the work as a book titled İki Emel. He also translated Vittorio Alfieri's essay Della Tirannide (1789) under the title İstibdâd (Despotism). In one of the poetry books he published in Geneva, Kahriyât, he included poems written with political aspirations rather than artistic concerns, themed on freedom and patriotism, almost all of which were directed against Abdul Hamid II, accusing him of hostility towards liberty.

Eventually, Abdul Hamid took notice of the dangerous literature Cevdet was publishing. In 1899 Cevdet softened his publications so 72 of his friends imprisoned in Fezzan and Tripoli could be released. The Sultan then offered to buy him out by employing him as chief physician of the Vienna embassy on the condition that he would give up writing political articles and stay away from Istanbul, an offer which he accepted, to much consternation from his Young Turk friends. During this time, although he continued to identify with the sultan's opposition to some extent, he occupied himself more with poetry and publishing books that received interest from Symbolist circles. His poetry was linked with the movement, and he received accolades from leading French authors like Gustave Kahn.

His position was suspended in 1903 after an incident where he slapped the ambassador who informed the palace that he was secretly continuing his political activities. He returned to Geneva and founded the Ottoman Union and Revolution Committee [Osmanlı İttihat ve İnkılap Cemiyeti] and published the Osmanlı again as the organization's organ. The government organized a false flag operation to extradite him from Switzerland, by claiming his authorship of a pornographic booklet that targeted the sultan, though it was actually published by a government agent. Cevdet was deported from Switzerland, but he was able to move to Egypt.

=== Egyptian years ===
From 1904 to the end of his life in 1932, Cevdet published the periodical İctihad and stayed out of politics, writing articles to promote Westernization and secularism. It came under several aliases as the magazine would be interrupted by shuttering: Cehd, İşhâd, İştihâd, Âlem, Eski İçtihad.

He moved to Cairo and joined Prince Sabahaddin's Private Enterprise and Decentralization League. He wrote articles in support of the 1906 Erzurum Uprising and called for constitutional monarchy along with the abolition of certain taxes. After the Young Turk Revolution and the return of constitutional monarchy he did not return home immediately, but stayed in Egypt for a while longer until 1910.

In Cairo he sought to reconcile the Eastern and the Western literary traditions. Within the framework of this goal, he translated Shakespeare, Schiller, Hugo, and Byron, as well as Saadi, Rumi, and Khayyam. He believed the Ottoman Empire was backwards and not competitive because of the role of religion in society. In 1908, he translated and published Reinhart Dozy’s two-volume work Essai sur l’Histoire de l’Islamisme ("Essay on the History of Islamism") under the title Tarih-i İslâmiye ("Islamic History"). The book, which was critical of Islam and of Muhammed, caused immense controversy upon its release; it was banned and confiscated by the censors in February 1910 and existing copies were thrown from the Galata Bridge after catching the attention of the Sheikh-ul-Islam. Cevdet claimed that he translated the work to allow Muslim historians to correct Dozy's mistakes.

He thanked and met Theodor Herzl for publishing one of his poems in Neue Freie Presse in 1903. After this acquaintance, he started to help Herzl by translating his letters into Turkish.

=== After 1910 ===
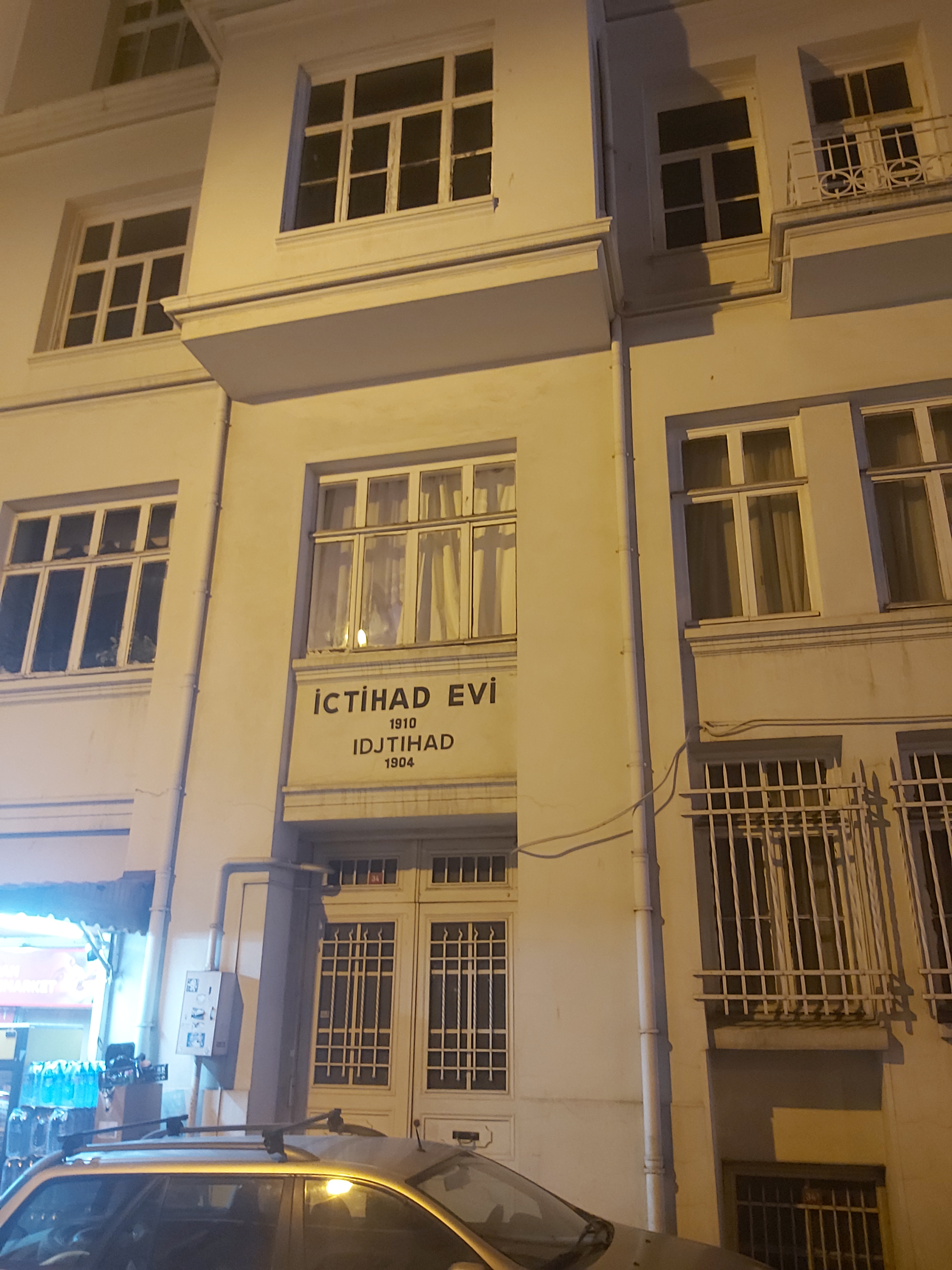
İctihad Evi and Abdullah Cevdet used the upper floors of the building as the editorial office of the magazine and his own residence and office.

In 1908, he joined the Ottoman Democratic Party (Turkish: Fırka-i İbad, Osmanlı Demokrat Fırkası) which was founded against the CUP.

He returned to Istanbul in 1910. He established his own printing house, İctihad Evi, or the Idjtihad House, where he published the Kütüphane-i Ictihad series. His house in Cağaloğlu became something of a salon for intellectuals in the capital. Among those Abdullah Cevdet hosted included Yusuf Akçura, Hasan Âli Yücel, Nazım Hikmet, Mehmet Emin Resulzade, Prof. Karl Süssheim, and Madam Corrine. In 1912, he and Hüseyin Cahit advocated without success for the Latin script be used to write Turkish, which would eventually happen in 1928. He was an advocate for the teaching of biological materialism in schools and for opening schools in the countryside to educate peasants, which would eventually happen in 1940. He emphasized the concepts of citizenship and general will expressed by Rousseau in The Social Contract. Cevdet was subject to political pressure due to his critical stance against the CUP which at this point established a dictatorship, and Turkey's participation in World War I, and was forced to stop writing in 1914. He wrote anonymous editorials in the İkdam for a while.

During the occupation era (1918–1923) he was appointed to the General Directorate of Health [Sıhhiye Genel Müdürlüğü] by the Grand Vizier Damat Ferid Pasha. He was likely the first to advocate for the regulation of sex workers in Turkey, though the discovery of him issuing brothel certificates for prostitutes resulted in his dismissal from his job due to public outrage. He was initially in favor of Turkey becoming a mandate. During the Turkish War of Independence he played a role in the establishment of the Friends of England Association and briefly was active in the Society for the Rise of Kurdistan from 1921 to 1922. He immediately took Ankara's side upon the opening the Grand National Assembly, and worked to provide health services in the provisional government. Due to his pro-British stance during the occupation years and his involvement in Kurdish nationalist organizations, he was banned from state service for life during the Republican period. He spent the rest of his life writing poetry, translating, and publishing İctihad.

Cevdet was put on trial several times because some of his writings were considered blasphemous against Islam and Muhammad. For this reason, he was labelled as the "eternal enemy of Islam" and called "Aduvullah" (the enemy of God). His most famous court case was due to his defense of the Baháʼí Faith, which he considered an intermediary step between Islam and the final abandonment of religious belief, in his article in İctihad on 1 March 1922.

=== One-party era ===
Abdullah Cevdet's translations, compilations, articles, books, and projects on educational reform were said to be the secret program of Atatürk's reforms. He published the program of the utopian plan in a work called Uyanık Bir Uyku, which was developed with Kılıçzade Hakkı in İctihad.

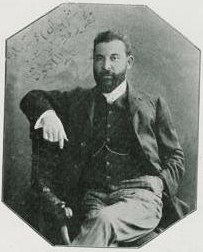
1910 portrait

In 1925, President Mustafa Kemal Atatürk hosted Abdullah Cevdet in Çankaya Mansion. Cevdet was impressed by Atatürk's library and the two held mutual admiration. According to him, “Gazi Pasha [Atatürk] had fulfilled the goals that intellectuals had nurtured with fire and faith for many years.” Their meeting was scheduled for one hour, but their meeting ended up lasting four hours. As he was leaving, Mustafa Kemal told his guest, “I did everything you wrote and said.” After Cevat Pasha resigned his parliamentary seat from Elâzığ, there were talks to have Cevdet take his seat in a by-election. These plans were quashed by a smear campaign started by the conservative newspaper Tevhid-i Efkâr, whose writers accused Cevdet of "wanting to import human breeding studs from Europe.” This was a distortion of a proposal of Cevdet's to invite farmers with experience in animal husbandry from the Balkans, Italy, and Germany to settle uncultivated land in Anatolia and teach the peasants.

In 1924, he translated Le Bon Sens, a book of religious criticism and a sort of atheist manifesto written by Franco-German philosopher Baron d'Holbach under the pseudonym of Jean Meslier; and it was published under the title Rahib Melye'nin Vasiyetnamesi Hakkında ("On the Testament of Father Meslier"). In 1928, upon Atatürk's request, the work was published under the title Akl-ı Selim ("Common Sense") in the State Printing House among the Publications of the Ministry of National Education. He dedicated its first copy Atatürk, who ordered the book be printed in the new Latin derived alphabet in 1929. In 1931, he published his poems in a book called Karlıdağ’dan Ses ("The Sound from the Snowy Mountain"). In 1934 his family would take the surname Karlıdağ.

Left alone in his final years, Abdullah Cevdet died of a heart attack in Istanbul at the age of 63 on 29 November 1932. His body was brought for religious funeral service to Hagia Sophia, which was still used as a mosque at that time. However, nobody claimed his coffin due to his alleged atheism, and it was expressed by some religious conservatives that he "did not deserve" an Islamic funeral prayer. Following an appeal from Peyami Safa, a notable writer, the funeral prayer was performed. His body was then taken by municipal workers to the Merkezefendi Cemetery for burial. After his death, his personal library and archive were preserved by his daughter Gül Karlıdağ. The rare works are kept together with the furniture and other items he used on the top floor of the İctihad House in Cağaloğlu, which still stands today.

== Views ==
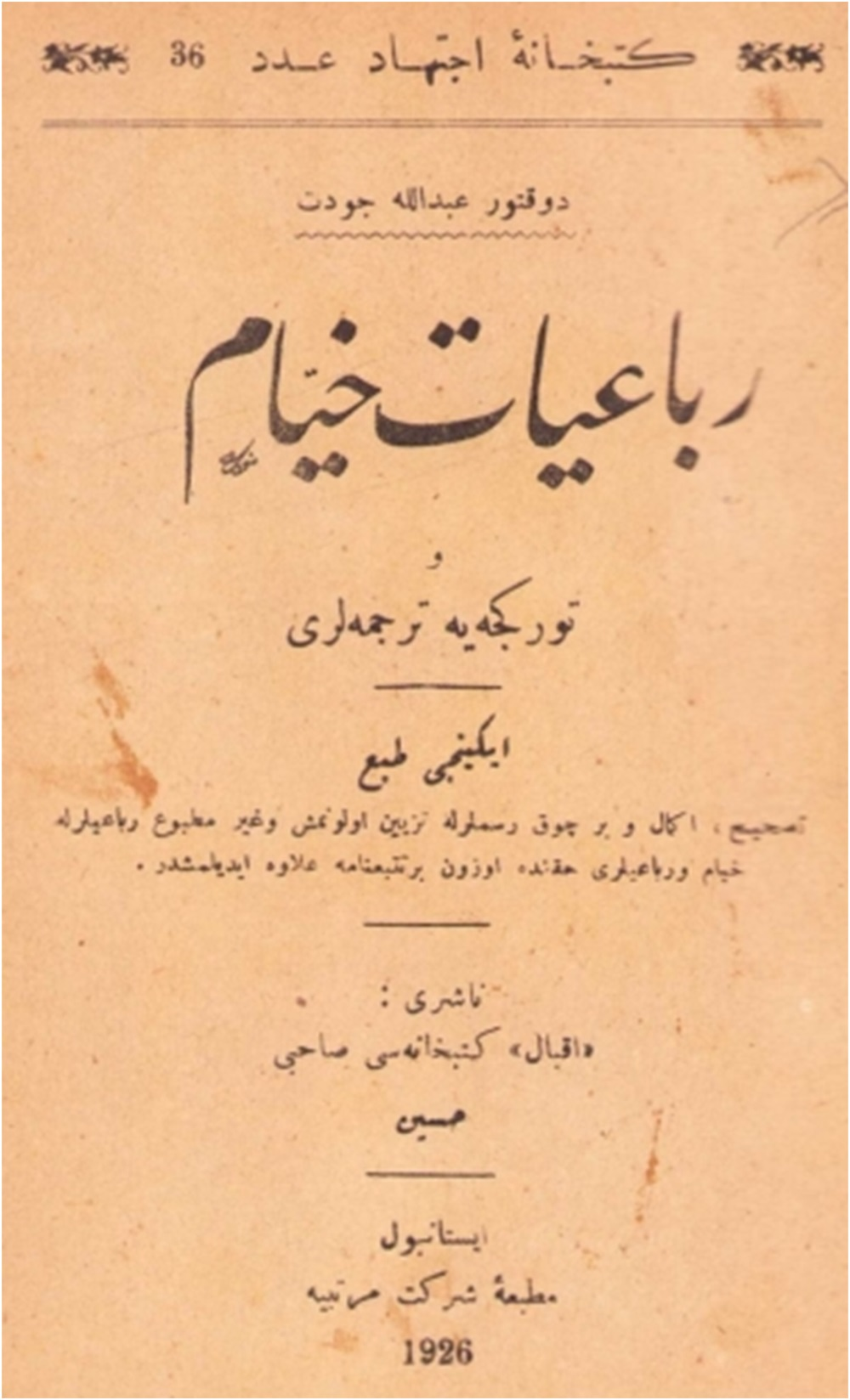
Cevdet's Turkish prose translations of Khayyam's Persian original: Rubā‘iyyāt-ı Ḫayyām ve Türkçe'ye Tercümeleri

=== Religion and science ===
Cevdet wanted to fuse religion and materialism, that is, under the influence of Victor Hugo and Jean-Marie Guyau, discard God but keep religion as a social force. In one poem he says:

We are pious infidels; our faith is that

Being a disciple of God is tantamount to love.

What we drink at our drinking party is

The thirst for the infinite.

Şükrü Hanioğlu describes Cevdet's influences and goals as the following: "Ranging from the New Testament to the Qur’ān, from Plato to Abū al-‘Alā’ al-Ma’arrī, he created an eclectic philosophy, reconciling science, religion, and philosophy with one another", and in order to specifically build an "Islamic materialism" (he was a translator of Ludwig Büchner, one of the main popularizers of scientific materialism at the end of the 19th century), he would use medieval mystical authors like Al-Maʿarri, Omar Khayyam and Rumi, and try to find correspondence in their works with modern authors such as Voltaire, Cesare Lombroso, Vittorio Alfieri and Baron D'Holbach. His "final step was to present modern scientific theories ranging from Darwinism to genetics as repetitions of Islamic holy texts or derivations from the writings of Muslim thinkers", trying to fit the Qur'an or ahadith with the ideas of people like Théodule Armand Ribot or Jean-Baptiste Massillon. He found that "the Qur’ān both alluded to and summarized the theory of evolution."

He expressed his belief in science as, “In short, in places where science and technology plant their flags, deserts turn into wheat fields, marshes into flowery gardens. Captivity and poverty disappear, and happiness, honor and truth begin to live.”

Disillusioned by the ulema's lukewarm response to his role as "materialist mujtahid" (as he would term it), he turned to heterodoxy, the Bektashi (whom he called "Turkish Stoicism") and then Baháʼísm. As he had little success in that regard as well, his last efforts were purely intellectual.

== Family ==
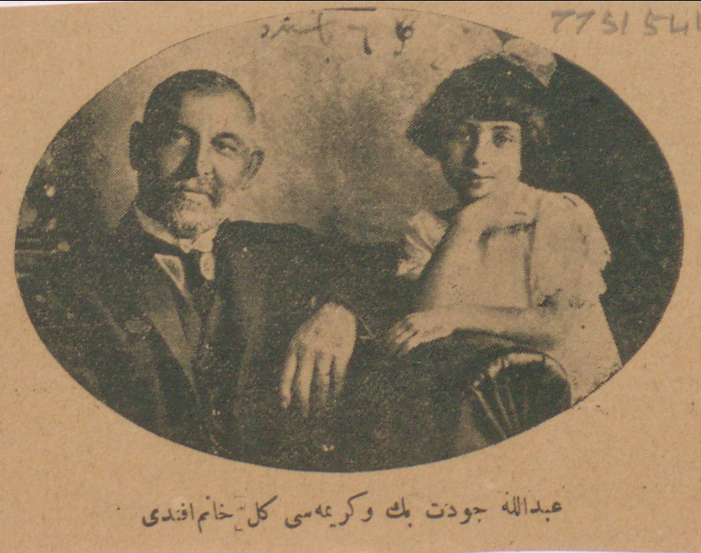
Abdullah Cevdet and his daughter Gül Karlıdağ

His wife was Fatma Hanım, daughter of Ahmet Hamdi Bey, the Istanbul Police Chief and Mayor of Beyoğlu during the reign of Abdul Hamid II. His family adopted the surname Karlıdağ. He had two children: a son Mehmed Cevdet Karlıdağ and a daughter Gül Karlıdağ, who was active in the Workers' Party of Turkey.

== Legacy ==
In 2005 there was an attempt to rename a street in Ankara after Abdullah Cevdet which received intense reaction from Islamist newspapers. Akit correspondent Hasan Karakaya dug up the "European breeding studs" canard in his recrimination of the initiative.

== Bibliography ==
=== Poetry ===
- Hiç (1890)
- Türbe-i Masumiyet (1890)
- Tulûat (1891)
- Masumiyet (1894)
- Kahriyât (1906)
- Karlı Dağdan Ses (1931)
- Düşünen Musiki (1932)
- Rafale de Parfums : Sonnets (1904)

=== Prose ===
- Ramazan Bahçeleri (1891)

=== Philosophy ===
- Dimâğ (1890)
- Fizyolacya-i Tefekkür (1892)
- Fünûn ve Felsefe (1897)

=== Translations ===
- Max Weber's [Asırların Panoraması]
- Gustave Le Bon’s [Asrımızın Hususu Felsefiyesi]
- Omar Khayyam's Rubaiyat
- Mevlânâ's Selected Divans
- Gustave Le Bon's [Dün ve Yarın] (1921)
- Gustave Le Bon's [İlm-i Ruh-i İçtimai] (1924)
- Gustave Le Bon's [Ameli Ruhiyat] (1931)
- Baron d'Holbach's Le Bon Sens [Akl-ı Selim: Sağduyu Tanrısızlığın İlmihali] (1928)

== See also ==
- List of Kurdish philosophers
- List of Young Turks
