= Karl Süssheim =

German professor of Islamic history

Karl Süssheim (21 January 1878, in Nuremberg – 13 January 1947, in Istanbul, Turkey), was a German historian and Orientalist of Jewish descent. He was a professor of Islamic history and was fluent in Arabic, Persian and Ottoman Turkish.

== Life ==
He was the son of hops dealer Sigmund Süssheim and his wife Clara, who moved to Nuremberg in 1870. He was a maternal grandson of the Bavarian politician David Morgenstern (de). Süssheim studied history, philosophy and science at the University of Jena, the Ludwig-Maximilians-Universität München, the University of Erlangen–Nuremberg and Humboldt University of Berlin. Then he studied at the Department of Oriental Languages with Martin Hartmann On 5 March 1902, he submitted his dissertation, Prussian Annexxionsbestrebungen francs in 1791–1797, a contribution to the biography Hardenberg (1901) After that he studied in Constantinople (modern-day Istanbul) until 1906.

In 1908, during the Young Turkish revolution he went to Cairo. By 1911, he was in Munich and published his book, Prolegomena to an edition of the British Museum in London held chronicle of the Seljuk Empire and was an adjunct at the Ludwig-Maximilians-Universität München. Under Fritz Hommel and Gotthelf Bergsträsser, he taught Arabic, Persian and Turkish, at the Ludwig-Maximilians-Universität München. From 1919 until his dismissal from the Bavarian civil service by the National Socialists on 27 June 1933, he was an associate professor there. Among his students were, the medievalist Ernst Kantorowicz, the Jewish historian of religion Gershom Scholem and the orientalist Franz Babinger.

From 1934 until his emigration, Süssheim lived with his family at the 12th Munich Preysingstraße. After the pogrom of 9 November 1938, he lived for a short time at the KZ Preysing space. In 1941, he succeeded, with the help of Turkish friends, to immigrate to Istanbul with his wife and daughters. By this time, parts of his private library had been incorporated the Bavarian State Library. The Turkish friends in Istanbul helped him find a temporary job at the local Istanbul University. Süssheim died in 1947 from kidney disease and is buried in the Ortakoy cemetery district.

During his years in Istanbul, Süssheim collected numerous original manuscripts. In 1960, The Bavarian State Library acquired a large part of this collection. Süssheim also wrote his own texts, often handwritten in Ottoman and Arabic Even his own diary from the years 1908 to 1940; he started in Turkish and by 1936 he was writing in Arabic. After publication, it was compared with the diaries of Victor Klemperer.

The eloquent Orientalist was used in Istanbul as an interpreter at the German Embassy, and was even asked to be an interpreter for diplomatic meetings later in Germany. He interpreted on 30 April 1917 during a visit to the Grand Vizier Talat Pasha, with whom he corresponded since his stay in Istanbul.

He is described as a modest and reserved, but notable scholar He is the younger brother of the Bavarian Justices and SPD Member of Parliament Dr. Max Süssheim.
