= Ibrahim Temo =

Albanian politician (1865–1939)

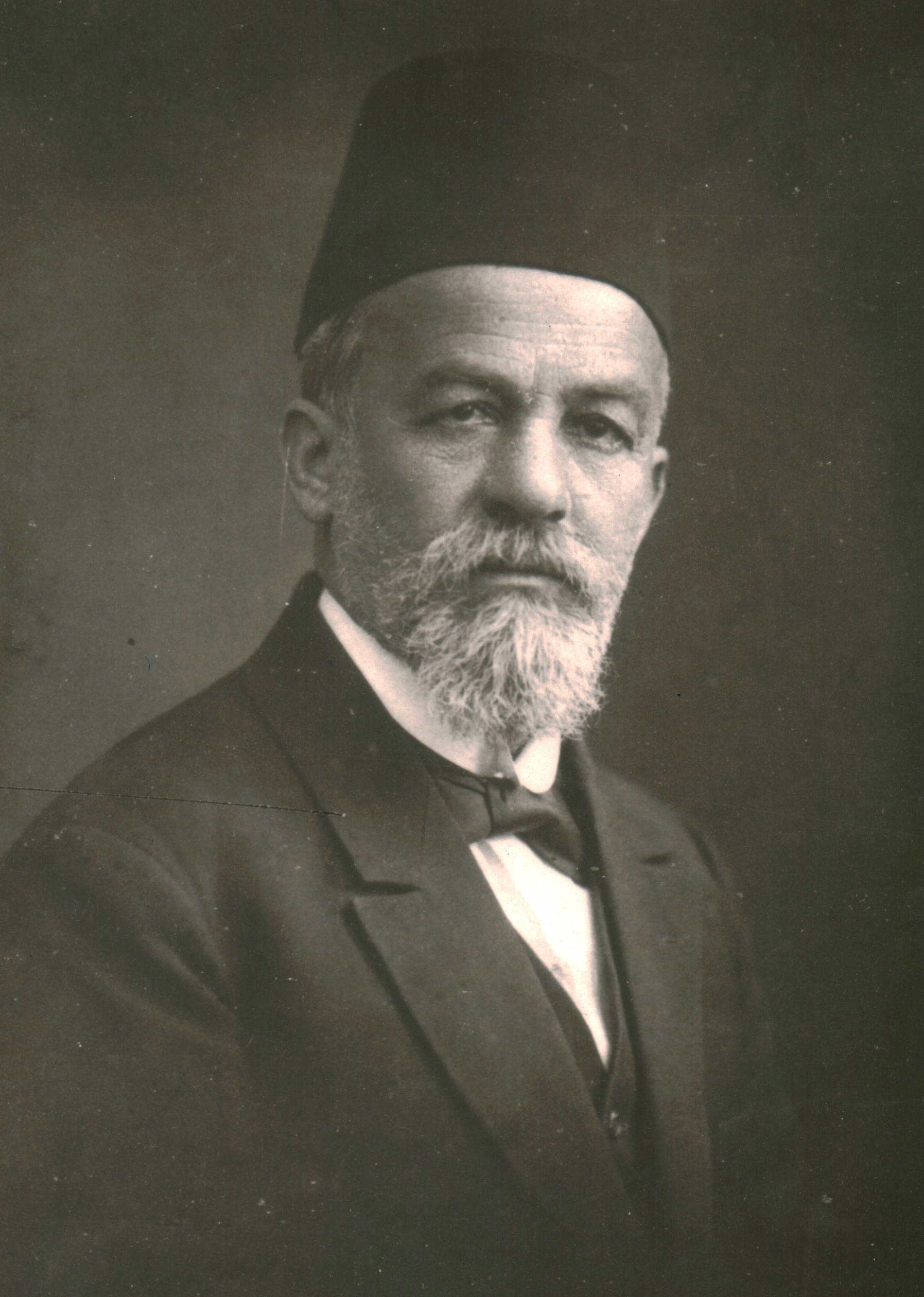
- Born: Ibrahim Ethem Sojliu; 22 March 1865; Struga, Ottoman Empire (present-day North Macedonia)
- Died: 5 August 1945 (aged 80); Medgidia, Romania
- Other name: Ibrahim Starova
- Occupations: Physician, writer
- Known for: Committee of Union and Progress; Society for the Publication of Albanian Writings; Society for the Unity of the Albanian Language
- Other political affiliations: Ottoman Democratic Party
- Relatives: Nuri Sojliu (brother)

Ibrahim Starova, also Ibrahim Bërzeshta (born Ibrahim Edhem Sojliu; 22 March 1865 – 5 August 1945), better known as Ibrahim Temo, was an Ottoman-Albanian politician, revolutionary, intellectual, and a medical doctor by profession. Temo was the original founder of the Committee of Union and Progress (CUP), then founded as an Ottomanist organization, following which he contributed to the Albanian National Awakening through his activities in the Bashkimi Society.

== Early life ==
İbrâhim Edhem was born in Struga 1865 to a family with origins from Starovë (now Buçimas), Albania, with ancestors that served as soldiers for the Ottoman Empire and later migrated to his birthplace. He acquired the nickname "Temo," a shortening of the name Edhem.

He was married to a sister of the Frashëri brothers (Abdyl, Naim and Sami).

== Albanian activism ==
During his student years, he came into contact with Albanian nationalist groups operating secretly in Istanbul. In addition to Albanian leaders such as Şemseddin Sâmi and Naim Frasheri, he also established contact with Apostol Margarit, one of the leaders of the Aromanian movement, which carried out anti-Greek propaganda together with Albanians in Macedonia. In 1879 during the League of Prizren period, Temo was a founder of the Society for the Publication of Albanian Letters (Albanian: Shoqëri e të shtypurit shkronjavet shqip).

== Founding the CUP ==
Temo, along with Mehmed Reshid, İshak Sükuti and Abdullah Cevdet where students enrolled at the Imperial School of Medicine and in 1889 they founded a secret society: the Ottoman Union Committee. The goals of the group were devoted toward overthrowing the absolute rule of Ottoman sultan Abdul Hamid II. In its early years the group was organised in small cells and individuals received a number with Temo being 1/1 indicating that he was the first cell and member of the movement. Their early activities involved protesting changes in the medical curriculum in the school.

Early on Temo recruited Albanians into the group such as Nexhip Draga and other Kosovars along with fellow nationals from Toskëria (Southern Albania). Temo became acquainted with Ahmet Rıza, the leader of the Paris cell and both established a working relationship. Rıza, drawing on ideas of positivist philosophy encouraged Temo's group to adopt the name Nizam ve Terakki which was a translation of Auguste Comte's motto "Order and Progress". The founders of the group including Temo were strongly insistent on using the term "Ittihad" (unity). During 1894–1895, a compromise was reached between both factions and they united under a new name Osmanli Ittihad ve Terakki Cemiyeti (Ottoman Committee of Union and Progress) or CUP.

In 1890, someone tipped the authorities and he was arrested in Ohrid while on holiday. He was released after being questioned by a special commission at the Yıldız Palace. He graduated from the Imperial School of Medicine with the rank of captain (1892) and began his specialization in ophthalmology at the Haydarpaşa Hospital (1893). He was arrested 3 more times after taking this position. After his last arrest he realized that he would be sent to Anatolia for an exile, he decided to leave the country like many other Young Turk intellectuals.

== Exile ==
Ottoman authorities uncovered the CUP group in 1895 resulting in the arrest and exile of its members and to avoid imprisonment Temo fled during November to Romania. He founded a branch of the CUP in Romania with the assistance of Kırımîzâde Ali Rıza, a former Ottoman naval officer. Temo published a Young Turk newspaper spreading CUP ideas among the Muslim population of Dobruja. He also founded CUP branches in the cities of Kazanlak, Vidin, Shumen, Ruse, Sofia and Plovdiv in neighbouring Bulgaria whose members included fellow Albanians and two branches in Shkodër and Tirana in Albania.

Temo was also active in the Albanian national movement present in Romania. He became vice president of the local branch of the Bashkimi (Union) Society in Constanța and prominently partook in its congresses held in Bucharest. Appeals issued by the Albanian Drita committee that asked for Albanian autonomy were initiated and prepared by Temo. While abroad Temo's thinking on the Albanian question was in national terms and expressed concerns about the Albanian community. He advocated for close cooperation between Orthodox Albanians and Orthodox Aromanians viewing both as having a common interest, due to opposition from the Greek Patriarchate and Bulgarian Exarchate in establishing schools and conducting church liturgy in their native languages. Temo viewed the Rum (Orthodox) district of Istanbul which represented Greek wealth and power in the Ottoman state as "the den of intrigue". In Romania Temo maintained close ties with the leadership of an Aromanian (Kutzo-Vlach) organisation and Romanian authorities supported those connections. Temo stated that he also worked for an understanding to be reached between Romanians and the Turkish minority of Romania against Slavism. Due to his activities his reputation was enhanced within the Balkans.

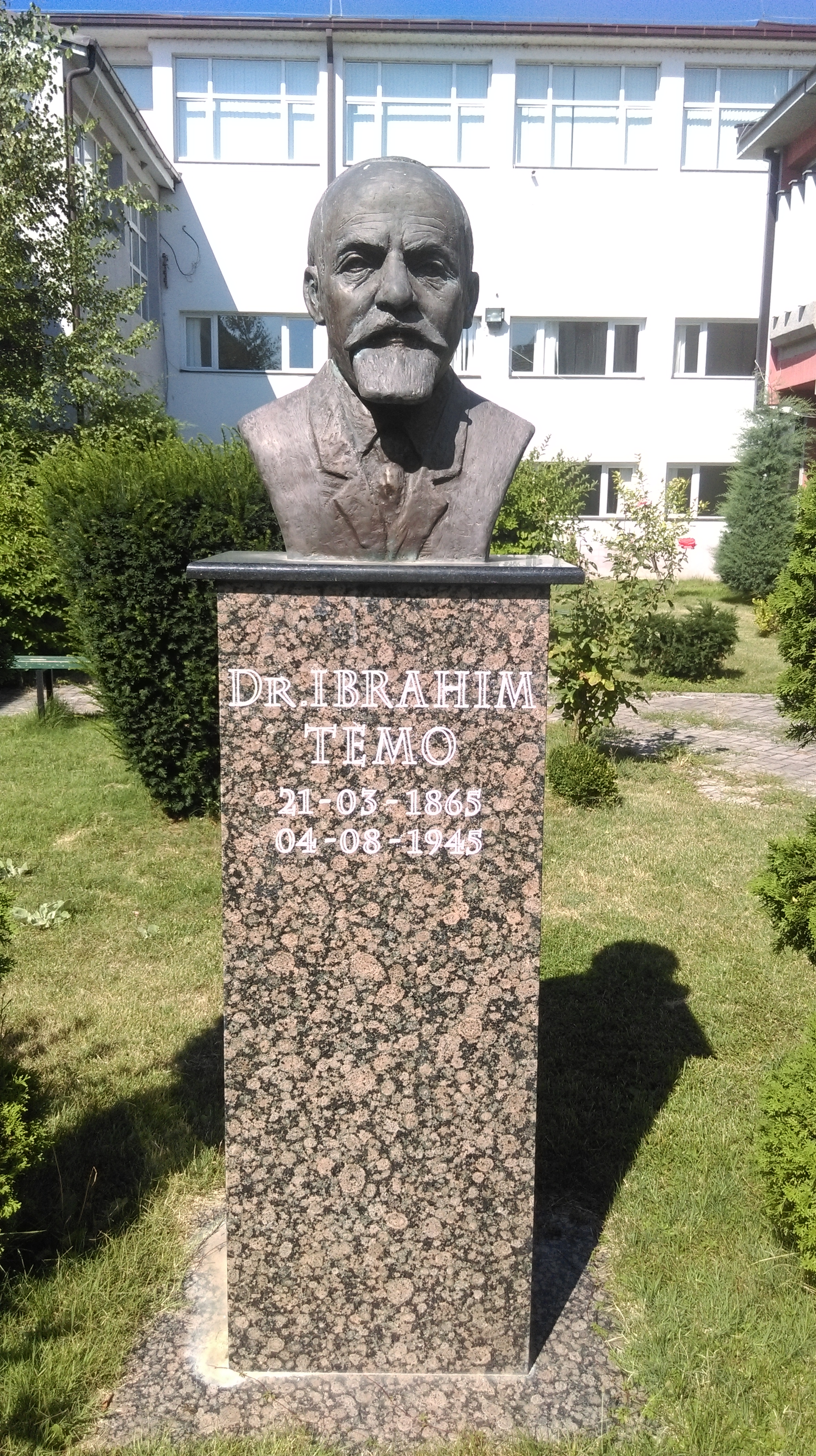
Bust of Ibrahim Temo at the Albanian high school named after him in Struga

During this period of exile Temo remained busy with CUP circles while his personal views became more liberal, such as advocating for a modified Latin alphabet to write the Turkish language. Other CUP members like Ahmet Rıza received Temo's recommendations coldly and nicknamed him "Latinist". Temo compiled an educational program that called for universal schooling of children and for foreign schools in Ottoman lands to have half their instruction in Turkish. In his memorandum, with thoughts on the Albanian language, Temo also advocated for the ethnic rights of minorities to have native language education in non-Turkish populated areas of the empire exceeding forty percent. He attempted in vain to convince Rıza and his companions who rejected his proposals such as for minorities to become loyal to the Ottoman nation certain concessions were needed to be made.

To secure support from the leading Young Turk organisations and to talk about the potential for activities within the Balkans, Temo toward late 1902 travelled to Europe to meet the leadership of the two dominant CUP factions. The Ottoman Empire asked the Romanian government to take necessary measures against him and the Ottomans tried and sentenced Temo in contumaciam. In Paris, Temo participated in the Congress of Ottoman Opposition (1902) organised by Prince Sabahaddin calling for reforms, minority rights, revolution and European intervention in the empire. Later from Romania he sided with Ahmet Rıza who was against foreign intervention in the Ottoman state. Temo feared that European involvement in Ottoman affairs could radicalise some ethnic groups to call for intervention in the empire. The solution for him was a strong Ottoman state being able to preserve Albanian territorial integrity and he viewed skeptically any Great Powers committing themselves to developing the interests of Albanians.

=== Post 1902 Congress ===
After a reorganisation of the CUP, Temo along with friends still involved in the group continued with Young Turk activities yet they were of little significance from an organisational perspective. Due to the contacts of Temo and his charisma, the reinvigorated Romanian branch became an important part of the CUP centre based in Paris. Temo and Kırımîzâde, the two leading CUP members of Romania sought to build up ties with CUP organisations in Paris to oppose and hinder an alleged plan by the sultan to change the line of royal succession. Both men sent a letter to prince Sabahaddin and asked of him for a plan about possible actions by his league in the event of the sultan's death. An offer of assistance by both men was made to the prince if he wished to return to the empire and continue his activities after the death of the sultan. Temo and Kırımîzâde also sent a similar document to other CUP members like Ahmed Rıza and he passed it on to Behaeddin Shakir.

The CUP centre informed Temo and Kırımîzâde that the proposal would be considered and an appeal on the topic had been prepared by the central committee. The central committee asked both men to assist in smuggling CUP propaganda into the Ottoman Empire and for them to reinvigorate their local branch according to new organisational rules. Shakir got Ali Sedad Halil, a subscriber of CUP journals based in Dobruja to unite and create a branch with Temo and Kırımîzâde. After letters were exchanged between the 3 Young Turks and the CUP centre, Temo got all three members to form a cell and engage in secret activities. The aims of cell was to distribute Young Turk propaganda to sympathizers and gather donations from them without informing those people of the group's secret activities. The local branch received support from the CUP centre abroad. Temo assisted Mustafa Ragib, a Turkish language secondary teacher in Dobruja to distribute Young Turk propaganda on behalf of the local CUP branch.

In May 1907, Shakir met with Temo, and other CUP members at Constanța where new instructions were given from the CUP centre. The directives from the central committee sought the assistance of Temo to hinder the activities of Ismail Qemali and his associates in Albania and for him to communicate with Albanian notables in an attempt to get help for an agent coming from Paris to Albania and Macedonia. He replied that an agent had been found by the local CUP branch who might be able work together with the CUP Istanbul branch. Temo stated that for further troubles in Albania to cease the only way was for the Ottoman government to officially recognise the Albanian language "like that of the Greek, Bulgarian, Romanian, and Jewish [Ladino] languages". After the union of the Ottoman Freedom Society with the CUP, the Romanian branch became important as the CUP centre viewed an agreement with Albanian committees and backing from Albanian notables as necessary with Temo asked to give support toward both endeavors.

The CUP central committee in December 1907, sent an invitation to Temo asking him to partake in the Congress of Ottoman Opposition Parties as a delegate. He was unable to go and in his place went Veliyullah Çelebizâde Mahmud Çelebi, the only delegate from any CUP branch which highlighted the importance that the central committee attached toward the Romanian branch and its director. As the headquarters of the Albanian Bashkimi Society were in Bucharest, the CUP requested Temo's assistance in inviting the organisation to the congress and through a telegram wanted to know from him in a quick response if they would participate. Later Temo sent an agent to İzmir as requested by the CUP centre yet after meeting with Armenians in the city the Young Turk operative was arrested by Ottoman authorities.

Using his charisma among CUP members within the Balkans, Temo strived toward invigorating the CUP movement in Albania and Bulgaria. He made frequent visits to Bulgaria and encouraged fellow CUP members. Temo instructed one of his followers Dervish Hima to write in CUP journals with the aim of achieving reconciliation between the Young Turks and Albanian opponents of the sultan. As an Albanian nationalist Temo wrote articles for the Albanian cause. The local CUP branch attempted to get support from Muslims in Constanța and Temo organised lectures in towns like Babadag to inform the public with some talks given by him being about medical topics.

== Return from exile ==
The Young Turk Revolution occurred in 1908, the CUP forced Abdul Hamid II to restore constitutional monarchy in the Ottoman Empire starting the Second Constitutional Era. He returned from exile but was informed by Djemal Pasha that much had changed in the CUP, as it had become the product of internal Ottoman branches and not the one advocated for by Temo and others while abroad. He soon published anonymous articles attacking the Unionists in their publications. He noticed the history of the revolution was already being written, and took care to promote important rebels who were being sidelined in favour of more famous ones. Temo had a soft spot for Atıf Bey, an key participant in the revolt, and paid a publisher based in Vienna to produce 10,000 postcards of his image.

In 1909 Temo founded the Ottoman Democratic Party and was elected its president. It advocated for democratic government, minority rights and upholding constitutional liberties that was in opposition to the CUP.

In Istanbul, he was first appointed as a sanitary inspector of Beyoğlu. After the dethronement of Abdulhamid II, he was appointed director of the Darülaceze, but was soon forced to resign. In 1911, he was sent away from Istanbul to combat cholera outbreaks in Edirne and Tekirdağ. After completing his duties in Edirne, he left Istanbul in January 1911 for Constanta.

Temo came to Istanbul during the Balkan Wars as head of a seven-person Romanian Red Cross delegation. He attempted to publish a Turkish newspaper called Şık in Medgidia (Mecidiye) in early 1914. He continued his research on writing Turkish in the Latin alphabet, preparing an alphabet resembling the modern Turkish alphabet and distributing it to teachers. He requested that Abdullah Cevdet publish the İçtihad magazine in Istanbul using this alphabet, but this idea was not implemented.

== Romanian politician ==
When Romania entered World War I, Temo served in its army as a major. After the Armistice, he joined the Albanian delegation to the Paris Peace Conference and served on the border demarcation sub-committee.

After returning to Romania, Ibrahim Temo joined the People's Party and served in the Romanian Parliament from 1920 to 1922 as a senator for Caliacra. He served as leader of the party's Medgidia chapter and as the city's interim mayor (1926). During his tenure in Parliament, he brought a dispute concerning the Adakale district, a Turkish-speaking island located on the Danube between Romania and Serbia, to Parliament's attention, contributing to the island's incorporation into Romania. He continued to publish medical and political articles in Turkish magazines. In 1937, he published a 16-page pamphlet titled "Why I Love Atatürk." Temo then embarked on writing his memoirs, sorting through his and İshak Sükûti's private documents and chronicling the founding and development of the CUP. He died in Medgidia on August 5, 1945.

== Legacy ==
A Macedonian high school in Struga in North Macedonia is named after Temo.
