= Ubeydullah Bey =

Mehmet Ubeydullah Efendi
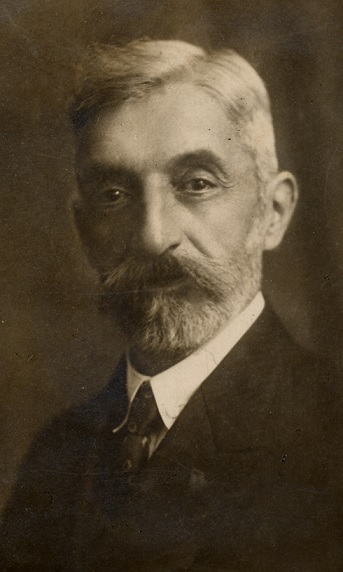

Personal details
- Born: 1858 İzmir, Ottoman Empire
- Died: 1937 (aged 78–79) Istanbul

Mehmet Ubeydullah Hatipoğlu, also known as Ubeydullah Bey or Ubeydullah Efendi (1858–1937) was an Ottoman politician during the imperial period.
