= Munis Tekinalp =

Turkish-Jewish writer, philosopher, and journalist

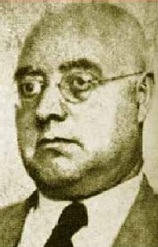
- Born: Moiz Cohen معز کوهن; 1883; Serres, Salonica Vilayet, Ottoman Empire
- Died: 1961 (aged 77–78); Nice, France
- Other name: Tekin Alp
- Citizenship: Ottoman, Turkish
- Education: École Impériale de Droit in Thessaloniki , Istanbul University, Dârülfünûn
- Occupations: Lawyer, Teacher, Writer, Journalist
- Movement: Ottomanism, Pan-Turkism, Kemalism
- Spouse: Matild Ben David
- Children: 3

Moiz Cohen (1883 in Serres, Salonica Vilayet, Ottoman Empire – 1961 in Nice, France) was a Turkish writer, philosopher, and journalist of Jewish heritage. He became an ideologue of different movements at different times: Ottomanism, Pan-Turkism, and Kemalism. Born to a Jewish family, he later changed his name to Munis Tekinalp.

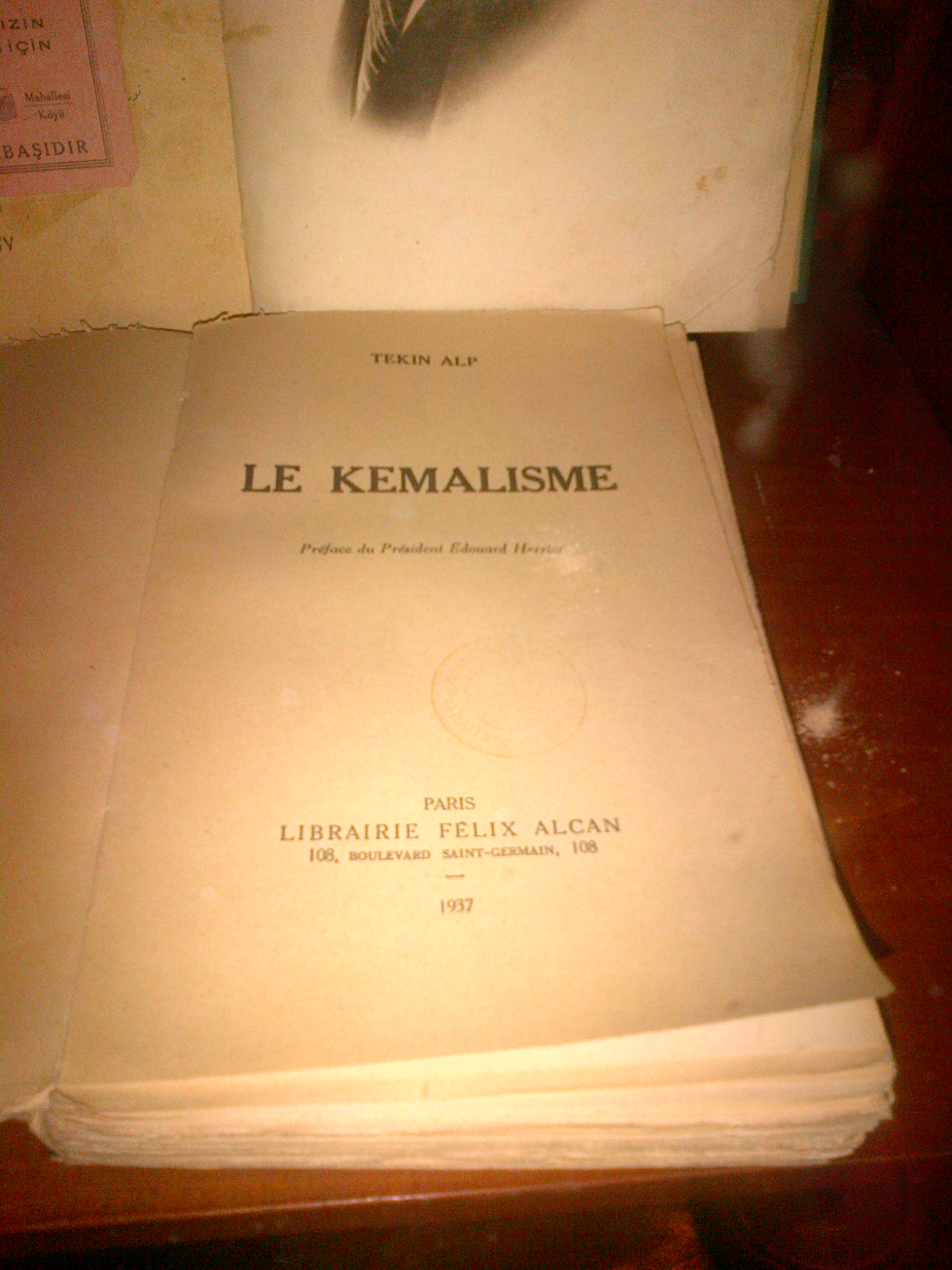
The Book named Kemlaism by Tekinalp.

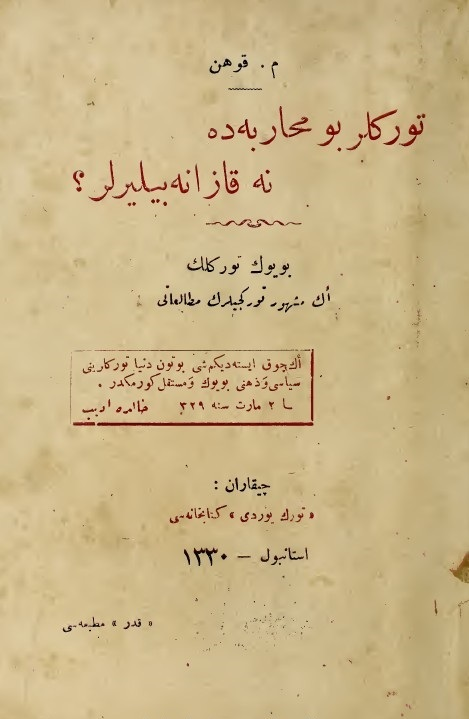
What Turkey can get from this battle, written by Tekinalp (Then known as M. Cohen) in 1914.

== Biography ==
He was sent for schooling in the Alliance Israélite Universelle school in Salonica, continuing for a rabbinical ordination (though he never practiced). He would later continue to legal studies in Salonica, completing them in Constantinople (present-day Istanbul) after Salonica fell to Greece.

In 1905, he began to write for the newspaper Asır, later renamed into the Yeni Asır where he worked for five years and was promoted to its editor-in-chief. In 1912 he left Salonica for Istanbul, where he began teaching law and economics at the Istanbul University and was engaged in tabac export. He published an economy magazine for the Association of Economy and served as a consultant for some companies until 1918.

In 1909 Tekinalp appeared in Ninth World Zionist Congress and spoke passionately about the Turks. Tekinalp contrasted Christian persecution of Jews to tolerant attutide of Ottoman Turks. He declared

Turkey [the Ottoman Empire] is the only land that has The Empire of Tolerant Turks been spared from the plague of antisemitism, appearing to us as a modern Canaan, the promised land for today’s Jews, who flee from the modern Egypts, the lands of slavery and grief.

He would later become one of the advocates of Turkish nationalism and an ideologue of Pan-Turkism. After 1923, he became a passionate ideologue of Kemalism and wrote a standard work about it. He taught in the community schools, and entered active politics in the Republican People's Party (CHP) for which he served in the city council. Tekinalp ran for the general elections in 1954 and 1957, however he could not enter the parliament. He served as the secretary general of the Istanbul Chamber of Commerce. He wrote for the newspapers Cumhuriyet, Vatan, Akşam, Hürriyet, and Son Posta.

He was an adherent of the idea of a forceful Turkification of the minorities within the Turkish Republic and wrote such in his pamphlet Türkleştirme (1928). In 1934 he, Hanri Soriano and Marsel Franko, also Jews, founded the Turkish Culture Association (Türk Kültür Cemiyeti) for the promotion of the Turkish language. He presented the principles of Kemalism in a book published in Istanbul in 1936, then updated and translated them into French one year later, with a preface by Édouard Herriot (Le Kémalisme, Paris: Félix Alcan Publisher, 1937). Tekinalp was so dedicated to the cause of Turkification that he wrote an article entitled Ten commandments of Turkification for the Jews.

Following his retirement from the Turkish Language Association in 1956, he moved to Nice, France, where he died in 1961. He was buried in the Jewish cemetery of Nice.

== Ten commandments of Turkification ==
Following the founding of the Republic of Turkey, Tekinalp became a proponent of Kemalist nationalism, which is strictly confined to Turkey.In his pamphlet *Türkleştirme* ("Turkification"), he urged Turkey's Jews to Turkify. He set forth ten demands, provocatively labeling them the "Ten Commandments" (*Evamir-i Aşere*). They were as follows:

- Turkify names!
- Speak Turkish!
- Conduct synagogue prayers—at least in part—in Turkish!
- Turkify the schools!
- Send your children to state schools!
- Engage in the country's affairs!
- Socialize with Turks!
- Cast off the "communal spirit" from your character!
- Fulfill your duty to the national economy!
- Know your rights!

== Works ==
- Tekinalp (1914). Turan. Türk Yurdu Kitabhanesi. p. 143.
- Tekinalp, Munis (1928). Türkleştirme. p. 99.
- Tekinalp, Munis (1936). Kemalizm. Cumhuriyet Gazete ve Matbaası. p. 347.
- Tekinalp, Munis (1944). Türk ruhu. Remzi Kitabevi. p. 287.
- Tekinalp, Munis et Yıldız Akpolat (2005). Tekin Alp ve Türkleştirme. Fenomen. p. 82. ISBN 9789759893224.
