= İshak Sükuti =

Kurdish writer and doctor (1868–1903)

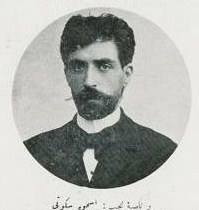
- Born: 1868; Diyarbakır, Ottoman Empire
- Died: 9 February 1902 (aged 33–34); Sanremo, Kingdom of Italy
- Citizenship: Ottoman
- Education: Medicine
- Occupations: Physician, writer
- Movement: Committee of Union and Progress (1889–1902)

İshak Sükûti (Ottoman Turkish: اسحاق سكوتی, Turkish: [isˈhak syˈcuːti]; 1868–1902) was an Ottoman Kurdish revolutionary, writer and medical doctor.

== Biography ==
İshak Sükuti was born in Diyarbakır, Ottoman Empire into a poor Kurdish family. After his graduation from Kuleli Military Medical School, Sükuti registered at the Gülhane Military Medical Academy in Haydarpaşa in 1887. He joined Ibrahim Temo, Mehmed Reshid and fellow Kurd Abdullah Cevdet in forming a progressive secret society called Ittihad-ı Osmani Cemiyeti, later known as the Committee of Union and Progress (CUP) and originally devoted to overthrowing the absolute rule of Ottoman sultan Abdul Hamid II. By completing his education, he became a medical doctor. Working at Haydarpaşa hospital he opposed the administration of sultan Abdülhamid II. In 1896 the Ottoman government discovered a plot to overthrow the sultan by CUP members and most of them such as Sükuti were exiled to Tripolitania, from where he later escaped and went to Geneva, Switzerland. Along with Abdullah Cevdet, he published a CUP newspaper Osmanlı Gazetesi (Ottoman Gazette) in Geneva and at times both were assisted by Tigrane Zaven, an Armenian intellectual. Sükuti contributed to the publication with anonymous articles and Osmanli was published through his financial assistance.

On 9 February 1902 Sükuti died in Sanremo. His death had profound consequences on remaining members who belonged to the old core of the CUP organisation and were not part of other newer factions. During his lifetime the leadership and assistance of Sükuti had made it possible for the remaining members of the old CUP to function and the membership acknowledged that reality and grieved his death. Sükuti was well respected among fellow members of the old CUP. Ahmet Rıza, a leader of the new CUP group wrote in Mechveret Supplement Français a short obituary note. Rıza held a low opinion of the old CUP faction and was open about having no respect for Sükuti. Following Sükuti's death an additional problem arose for the membership of the old CUP organisation. In life he was their archivist for nearly several years and had gathered a large amount of documents on the organisational and internal matters of the CUP. After his death the sultan ordered Ottoman diplomats to take ownership of those papers and they were transferred to the palace with the event being a blow to the old CUP faction as Ottoman Intelligence had possession of sensitive information.
