= Mihri Müşfik Hanım =

Turkish artist (1886–1954)

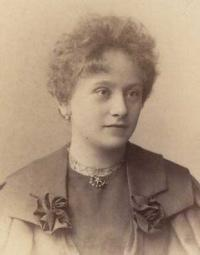
- Born: Mihri Rasim Achba; 26 February 1886; Baklatarlası, Kadıköy, Constantinople, Ottoman Empire (present day Istanbul, Turkey)
- Died: c. 1954 (aged 67–68); New York City, United States
- Burial: Pauper's graveyard, Hart Island, New York
- Spouse: Müşfik Selami Bey (div. 1923)
Names
- Mihri Müşfik Hanım
- House: Achba
- Father: Ahmed Rasim Pasha Achba
- Mother: Fatma Neşedil Hanım
- Religion: Islam

Mihri Müşfik Hanım (Ottoman Turkish: مهری مشفق خانم; born Mihri Rasim Achba; 26 February 1886 – c. 1954) was an Abkhazian princess and painter who became one of the first and most renowned female painters in Turkey. She was recognized especially for her portraits, including popular figures Mustafa Kemal Atatürk and Pope Benedict XV.

== Early life and education ==
Mihri Müşfik Hanım was born on 26 February 1886 in the Rasim Pasha Mansion, Baklatarlası neighborhood of Kadıköy in Istanbul. She was a member of Abkhazian princely family, Achba. Her father was Prince Dr. Ahmed Rasim Paşa, an anatomy specialist, and a preeminent instructor at the Military School of Medicine. He was also the president of this institution. His refined tastes and interest in music, painting, and literature played an important role in the artistic formation of his daughter. In addition to his reputation as a physician, he was also famous for his interest in music, and for playing the saz at evening gatherings. Her mother was Fatma Neşedil Hanım, also an Abkhazian. Her younger sister Enise Hanım was mother to the painter Hale Asaf, another distinguished female artist of the late Ottoman society.

Mihri Hanım received a typical western education. She took an interest in literature, music, and painting. Her first private lessons in painting were provided by an Italian Orientalist artist, Fausto Zonaro, in his studio in the Istanbul quarter of Beşiktaş-Akaretler. She fell in love with the Italian director of an acrobat company visiting Istanbul, and subsequently departed for Rome, and then Paris, evidently wishing to be involved in art circles. For some time, she lived and worked in a flat in Montparnasse, sustaining herself by painting portraits, and subletting one of the rooms to students. One of these tenants was Müşfik Selami Bey, a student of politics at the University of Sorbonne, whom she later married. Müşfik was the son of Selami Bey, a well-known personage from Bursa. He was interested in politics, history, and literature. However, their date of marriage is unknown.

== Career ==
=== Early career ===
Mihri was introduced to Cavid Bey, Ottoman Minister of Finance, in Paris to arrange an agreement with the French government following the Balkan Wars. Telegrams sent by Cavid Bey to the Minister of Education recommending Mihri resulted in her being appointed as an art teacher at the Istanbul Teachers' Training School for Girls in 1913. When the School of Fine Arts for Girls (İnas Sanâyi-i Nefîse Mektebi) was established in 1914, she was employed here as director as well as fine arts instructor, following the appointment of mathematician Salih Zeki Bey.

=== Edebiyat-ı Cedide ===
Mihri also had friends among the poets of the Edebiyat-ı Cedide (New Literature) movement, especially one of its leaders, Tevfik Fikret. If the Edebiyat-ı Cedide constituted the literary wing of French artistic influence among the late Ottoman intelligentsia, Mihri Hanım can be said to represent its counterpart in painting; she clearly had a special place among the artists of this school. Tevfik Fikret's house in Aşiyan became her studio for a time.

Edebiyat-ı Cedide poets were influenced by Realism, Parnassianism, and Symbolism, which dominated nineteenth-century French literature during this period. Cenab Şehabeddin, a member of Servet-i Fünun, notes one of its principal conceptions, a special relation with nature: "a place where emotions and dreams roam," it was also taken to act as the mirror of the artist's souls. In addition to this influence, the colour symbolism of Edebiyat-ı Cedide poetry seems to have influenced Mihri Hanım's work Maî ve Siyah [Blue and Black], Halid Ziya Uşaklıgil's famous novel reflects the 'blues' of the Edebiyat-ı Cedide school as well as Mihri Hanım's portraits.

=== Allegations ===
Mihri Hanım's visit to the journalist Hüseyin Cahit Yalçın and the convicted ex-minister of finance, Cavit Bey, gave rise to criticisms regarding her behaviour. In response, in 1919 she and her students paid a visit to the newspaper Tanin, and denounced the allegations. Her close relations with the Committee of Union and Progress eventually caused Mihri Hanım to leave Istanbul, occupied by Allied powers, for Italy in 1919. Within a year of her return, she resumed teaching at the School of Fine Arts for Girls.

=== Visit to Italy and divorce ===
Toward the end of 1922, she went to Italy again and ended her marriage there with Müşfik Bey in 1923. She had an affair with the Italian poet Gabriele D'Annunzio and through him found an opportunity to paint a portrait of the pope as well as to work on the restoration of frescoes in a chapel. Mihri Hanım had been introduced to Gabriele D'Annunzio by her friend, painter Renato Brozzi, and corresponded with him through Brozzi. She was occasionally a topic in their correspondence. On 4 February 1926, d'Annunzio wrote to Brozzi: "Where is the Turkish lady? I have been unable to hear from her. If you see her, embrace her for me, but this embrace must be that of harem agha's". In another letter, written on 26 August 1926, the "Turkish lady" was once again recalled: "Where is the odalisque Mihri? What is she doing?" Apparently, regardless of Mihri Hanım's struggles as a professional, these Italian painters continued to view her through an Orientalist filter.

=== Later career ===
Mihri Hanım returned to Turkey briefly after the foundation of the Republic. Here, she painted Atatürk's portrait and presented it to him personally at the Çankaya Presidential Residence in Ankara.

Mihri Hanım subsequently traveled to Rome, to Paris and then to the United States (New York City, Boston, Washington D.C., and Chicago). A news item in the New York Times dated 25 November 1928 noted that a collection of Mihri Hanım's work was to be exhibited at the George Maziroff Gallery between November 26 and December 15.

In 1938 and 1939, she worked as a protocol hostess at the World Exposition in Long Island, New York. During this period, she painted a portrait of Rezzan Yelman, the wife of journalist Ahmet Emin Yalman, who lived in New York. She also reportedly produced cover illustrations for various journals published in New York during World War II.

== Death ==
She lived her last years in destitution, and died in 1954. She was buried in the potter's field on Hart Island in New York.

== Tribute ==
On 26 February 2017, Google Doodle commemorated her 131st birthday. In September 2019, she was featured in the New York Times Overlooked series obituaries on remarkable people whose deaths initially went unreported in newspaper.

== Sources ==
- Köksal, Duygu; Falierou, Anastasia (October 10, 2013). A Social History of Late Ottoman Women: New Perspectives. BRILL. ISBN 978-9-004-25525-8.
