= Hüseyin Kazım Kadri =

Ottoman statesman, governor, and writer

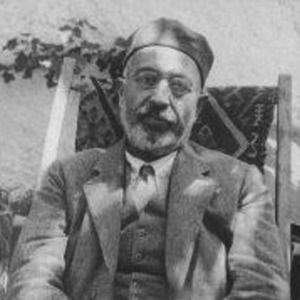
Hüseyin Kâzım Kadri

Hüseyin Kâzım Kadri or Hüseyin Kâzım Bey (1870-20 January 1934) was a Turkish statesman and writer who served as a governor and a minister in the last years of the Ottoman Empire.

Hüseyin Kâzım Kadri was born in 1870 in Istanbul's Beylerbeyi district. His father was Kadri Pasha (1843-1902), who was the governor of Trabzon. Hüseyin Kâzım Kadri graduated from Soğukçeşme Military High School and went to a Civil Service School. He published the Tanin newspaper together with Tevfik Fikret and Hüseyin Cahit upon the proclamation of the Constitutional Monarchy in 1908.

He was appointed as the governor of Aleppo between August 1910 and July 1911. He served as the mayor of Istanbul for a short time between July and August 1911. He put forward his candidacy in April–August 1912 and was elected as the deputy of Saruhan. When the Parliament was shut down, he was appointed as the Governor of Thessaloniki again, and was assigned to Syria during the First World War. In 1919, he was elected as a deputy from Aydın in the last Chamber of Deputies and entered the parliament. He served as the Deputy First Chief in the Chamber of Deputies. He was the Minister of Justice between February and March 1920, the Minister of Commerce between October 1920 and June 1921, the Minister of Foundations between June and August 1921, and the Minister of Justice again between August 1921 and July 1922. He also participated in meetings between Mustafa Kemal Pasha and the Ottoman delegation in Bilecik in 1921. Although he promised Mustafa Kemal Pasha that he would not take office in the government when he returned to Istanbul in this meeting, he did not keep his promise and continued his duty as a government minister. Using the pen-name of Sheikh Muhsin-i Fani, he wrote articles in the newspapers Tanin, İkdam, İçtihad and Servet-i Fünûn on religion, economy, philosophy, language and politics.

He left politics during the Republican years. He spent his last years in his family's mansion in Beylerbeyi. He died in Tarsus in 1934. His grave is in Istanbul's Üsküdar district.

== Views on Albanians ==
=== Content of the polemics ===
Hüseyin Kâzım Kadri attributed the loss of the European part of the Ottoman Empire to Albanian rebellions.

In 1914, in "Arnavutlar ne yaptı?" (What did the Albanians do?), using an emotional and insulting language, he affirmed that many Albanians stayed neutral in the face of the Greek-Slavic invasion of 1912 or even grabbed the occasion to attack Turkish soldiers. Furthemore, he stated that the Ottoman presence in the Balkans was thoroughly destabilized by the four Albanian revolts of 1909-1912.

While he acknowledged that the Young Turks' centralist policies went against Albanians' particular interests, he blamed them for not understanding how much those reforms were necessary for the Empire's survival.

He accused Albanian nationalist activists of being hypocrites ("snakes"), because they often made a brilliant career within Ottoman power structures; Albanian nationalist muslims being the worst of this kind, because they allied themselves with Western powers against an islamic government.

He also denounced as power-hungry traitors, those Turkish liberals who supported Albanian autonomist demands.

=== Reception and legacy ===
Hüseyin Kâzım Kadri was, indeed, the most virulent voice amongst an intellectual current of former pro-CUP military officers that blamed Albanians and Arabs for the fall of the Ottoman Empire.

His views were echoed by several Turkish personalities: Mustafa Fevzi Çakmak, in "Batı Rumeli'yi nasıl kaybettik?" (How did we lose Western Rumelia?), in 1925; Süleyman Sırrı Külçe, in "Osmanlı Tarihinde Arnavutluk" (Albania in Ottoman history), in 1944 and Bâbânzâde İsmail Hakkı, in his last articles for the "Tanin" (Resonance) newspaper.

Those views were exploited politically by both of the two opposite wings of the CUP's militant sphere: the secular nationalist "left-wing" and the islamic modernist "right-wing".

Hüseyin Nihâl Atsız, used it to argue that Turks should become "racist" and abandon any illusion of solidarity with non-Turkish muslims

By contrast, Mehmet Akif Ersoy (whose father, Tâhir, was an Albanian islamic theology professor (hoca efendi) at Fâtih University, in Peja), used it to convey a completely different message, in favour of preserving the ottomanist sentiment.

In in his 1913 poem "Arnavutluk yanıyor" (Albania is burning), Ersoy lamented, both at the suffering of Albanians at the hands of the Greek-Slavic invaders and at the dependency of Albanian forces towards their Austrian protector; while at the same time, explaining that Albanians could only blame themselves for what happened, since, by constantly rebelling, they provoked the demise of the Ottoman Empire, rendering this invasion possible.

The poem stated that Albanian muslims' embrace of nationalism was a violation of Divine Law, comparing it to a youngster who would rebel against his parents. It also lamented that nationalism made Albanians racist toward Turks and inspired Arabs to do the same; labeling those attitudes as a violation of islamic universalim.

Kiraz Ahmed Hamdi Zeza (whose father was an Albanian from Montenegro) felt compeled to respond to all those accusations in "Arnavutluk Hakkında" (About Albania), in 1920, where he argued that the Young Turks' persecution of competent but politically unaligned officers and its inability to deliver sufficient weapon supplies to the troops, were the real reasons behind the defeat.

== Works ==
- Hak ve Hakikat (1909)
- Felaha Doğru (1921)
- İstikbale Doğru (1913 under the pen name Sheikh Muhsin-i Fani)
- İslâmın Avrupa'ya Son Sözü (1913)
- Arnavutlar Ne Yaptı? (1914)
- Yirminci Asırda İslâmiyet (1913)
- Çar Nikola'ya Açık Mektup (1915)
- 10 Temmuz İnkılabı ve Netâyici (1920)
- Mahdum Kulu Divanı ve Yedi Asırlık Türkçe Bir Manzume (1924)
- Nûru'l-Beyan (with Gaziantepli Mustafa Efendi, 1924)
- Tarih Hatıraları (1930)
- Gazi Mustafa Kemal, Bir Milletin Ba'sü Badelmevti (1932)
- Büyük Türk Lügati I. Cilt (1927)
- Büyük Türk Lügati II. Cilt (1928)
- Büyük Türk Lügati III. Cilt (1943)
- Büyük Türk Lügati IV. Cilt (1945)
- İnsan Hakları Beyannamesi'nin İslâm Hukukuna Göre İzahı (Prepared for publication by Osman Ergin, 1949)
- Ziya Gökâlp'ın Tenkidi (edited by İsmail Kara, 1989)
- Meşrutiyetten Cumhuriyete Hatıralarım (edited by İsmail Kara, 1991)
