= Tan incident =

1945 looting of a Turkish newspaper

The Tan incident or Tan newspaper raid refers to the looting of the left-leaning daily newspaper Tan on 4 December 1945 by a mob.

== Background ==
In the second half of 1945, public opinion in Turkey was witnessing the pen fights between Tan and similar opposition newspaper Vatan, and Akşam, Cumhuriyet, Tanin, and Ulus, which were known to be pro-government. On 19 March 1945, Soviet Minister of Foreign Affairs Vyacheslav Molotov informed Selim Sarper, Turkey's Ambassador to Moscow, that the Turkish-Soviet Treaty of Friendship and Neutrality, signed between the USSR and Turkey on 17 March 1925, had expired and needed revisions in the light of changing conditions for its renewal. The first bilateral talks on this issue began. The USSR was not only displeased with the Montreux Convention signed in 1936, but was also disturbed by the fact that Turkey had signed a Friendship Pact with Germany four days before its attack on the USSR on June 22, 1941, and became close to it during the war. He thought the Turkish Straits were not safe enough.

In the negotiations between Molotov and Sarper in June 1945, the security of the Straits was under joint Turkish-Soviet control, and the borders between the two countries, which were finally determined by the 1921 Kars Treaty, were subject to the fact that some of the lands that belonged to Georgia and Armenia historically remained in Turkey. These two issues were discussed in the international and national public opinion under the name of the Soviet Union's territorial claims on Turkey and the Turkish Straits crisis. On the one hand, these were pointing to the urgent need for Turkey to come under the umbrella of the Western world in the face of the increasing Soviet threat, while on the other hand, some circles were pumping unfounded anti-Soviet hysteria to put Turkey in the post-war US orbit.

In the face of these developments in foreign policy, Tan was the only domestic media organ that advocated the improvement and development of Turkish-Soviet relations. With this policy, Tan began to be criticized by other press organs, and serious accusations were made against the newspaper's publishers, Zekeriya Sertel and Sabiha Sertel. On the other hand, the fact that high-level politicians such as Celâl Bayar, Adnan Menderes, Tevfik Rüştü Aras and Mehmet Fuat Köprülü, who resigned from the CHP and started to form a new party, Tan and the Sertels became closer. The relations that took shape and the articles of Tan''s writer Tevfik Rüştü Aras on the revival of Turkish-Soviet relations made the newspaper a target of the government and nationalists.

== Incident ==
The fights that escalated and hardened in the press towards the end of the year reached its peak with the publication of the first issue of the magazine Fikirler (Opinions, dated 1 December 1945) on 24 November 1945. Fikirler was a magazine that was published in order to gather different segments of opposition to the single-party government on a single front and to make the voice of the opposition that will establish the Democrat Party be heard. Mehmet Ali Aybar, Cami Baykurt, Niyazi Berkes, Behice Boran, Pertev Naili Boratav, Sabahattin Ali, who left the CHP in the second half of 1945 and became known as "The Four", also contributed to the magazine. Socialist intellectuals and writers of the period such as Esat Adil Müstecaplıoğlu and Aziz Nesin came together. Demands such as opposition to fascism, Soviet friendship, transition to a more democratic and free system, abolition of anti-democratic laws, and an end to one-party rule constituted the main theme of the magazine. The publication of Fikirler created a “bomb” effect, as Sabiha Sertel put it. The first edition of the magazine was sold out in a short time, and the second edition was made on the same day. The opposition movement, which included Celal Bayar and his friends, cooperated with other opposition groups in the country, and the Views, which was published as a product of this cooperation, disturbed the government of Prime Minister Şükrü Saracoğlu. An emergency meeting was held by the CHP; dealers were instructed not to sell Tan and Yeni Dünya ile Görüşler, and not to let government officials and students read these publications. In the 3 December 1945 issue of Tanin newspaper, which responded to the criticisms against the government and CHP by acting as a government spokesperson with the headline "Bizim Comrades Finally Throwing Their Masks off", published in Cumhuriyet on 4 December, Sabiha Sertel's article titled "Zincirli Hürriyet" in Fikirler was communist. An unsigned article titled "Kalkın Ey Ehli Vatan", written by CHP deputy and the newspaper's editor-in-chief Hüseyin Cahit Yalçın, accusing it of targeting Fikirler, ignited the attacks against Tan.

On the day the article was published, the Sertels received news that some university students would demonstrate in front of the printing house the next morning. Zekeriya Sertel called the Governor of Istanbul, Lütfi Kırdar, on the phone and asked for security measures to be taken. Kırdar stated that he was aware of the said demonstration and that the necessary measures had been taken. The next morning, on 4 December 1945, although Istanbul was under martial law, a large group of Turanist and Islamist university students gathered in front of the main gate of Istanbul University in Beyazıt Square. The crowd, who departed from here, first wanted to march to the Vatan newspaper, but Muharrem Ergin said, "Friends, Vatan newspaper is not the real danger for us. We gathered to protest the Tan newspaper, let's march towards Tan!" With a warning, he turned to Tan. "Death to Communists!", "Down with Communism", "Down with the Sertels", "Long Live İnönü", "Do You Want More Freedom Than That?" he shouted, destroying and looting the printing house with the management section of Tan. Meanwhile, the ABC and Berrak bookstores, which usually sell socialist-oriented publications, were also looted. The demonstrators, who went to Beyoğlu, attacked the offices of Fikirler and the newspapers Yeni Dünya and La Turquie. Many people were injured in the incidents. A section of the crowd later went in front of the offices of Büyük Doğu magazine and cheered in favor of Necip Fazıl Kısakürek. Tekin Erer, the intelligence chief of Tasvir newspaper, who witnessed what happened that day, described the event as follows in his memoirs:

(...) At that time, on the first floor of the newspaper, there was almost the biggest rotary market in Turkey. With the iron pieces there, the attack on this rotary started. All the breakable parts of the rotary were crushed.

On the second floor, there were linotype typesetting machines, type materials and machinery belonging to the crew. It was much easier for them to break and shatter. In addition, doors, windows, tables, chairs were smashed from floor to floor. The writings, papers, books in the eyes of the tables were being cut to pieces. Another group was taking the bobbins out of the paper warehouse next to the rotary circle of the newspaper and rolling them towards Sirkeci. Some young people wanted to set fire to the building, but this was not possible due to the large crowd.

Some of the personnel in the newspaper had come to the printing house because they had heard about the incident at night. As soon as they heard about the meeting in the garden of Beyazıt, some of those who came had moved away from the newspaper...

At 10.30 the destruction of Tan and his printing house was completely over. After it was concluded that no newspapers could be published here, and that no publications could be made for at least six months, the young people crossed the bridge and marched towards the Yeni Dünya Newspaper operating in the street on the corner of the Russian embassy in Beyoğlu, facing the tunnel. In addition to the New World, another French newspaper called La Turquie was published here. These, too, were publishing articles adopting communism as a substitute for Tan's publications. The police, with the thought that there would be an attack on the Russian embassy, kept the roads well with fire trucks. Therefore, the attempt to attack the Yeni Dünya Newspaper was failing at first. But after a while, the young people, who were ecstatic in the excitement of the society, attacked the firefighters, took the hoses from their hands and started to spray them on the firemen themselves. Taking advantage of this opportunity, the young people walked to the New World Printing House. Within minutes, this printing house was also destroyed. Machines, furniture, books, newspapers, archives were taken to the streets, torn to pieces. In the meantime, Berrak Bookstore, which sells left-wing publications in the tunnel, was destroyed and disappeared from business life.

At that time some groceries and stores had Tan plates with their names. As soon as they heard about the incident in Babıali, they had taken down or scraped their plates. Tan meze maker Petro in Karaköy could not find the challenge, so he wrote the letter C with oil paint on the initial letter T, thus Tan mezecisi became Can mezecisi.

== Aftermath ==
Along with other socialist-oriented newspapers and magazines that were attacked after the events, Tan ceased publication. The USSR claimed that this event was organized by the government, that it was actually an attack on the Soviets, and gave a note to Turkey on this matter. The opposition also argued that the demonstrations and events were organized by the "National Chief administration" and the "one-party regime".

On 5 December, the statement of Martial Law Commander Lieutenant General Asım Tınaztepe regarding the demonstrations was published in all newspapers:

Yesterday (Tuesday 4.12.1945), some of the university students attacked two press houses and several bookstores, and the Government, who wanted to prevent these movements, committed the crime they designed by not listening to the police forces. Proceedings and investigations were immediately initiated against them. This very sad event will never be tolerated. I declare and warn that these and similar actions will be met with violence and that such mass gatherings are prohibited.

Despite martial law prevailing in Istanbul during the Tan Incident, none of the demonstrators were tried and convicted. It is known that prominent names such as Süleyman Demirel, İlhan Selçuk, Celadet Moralıgil, Ali İhsan Göğüş, and Orhan Birgit were among those who participated in the raid. Although no one responsible for the raid could be identified, lawsuits were filed against Zekeriya and Sabiha Sertel and one of the newspaper writers, Nail Çakırhan, who were exposed to this act of mass lynching and plundering because of their previously published articles. They were tried in court under Articles 159 and 173 of the Constitution regarding "insulting the moral personalities of the Assembly and the Government". The court sentenced the Sertels to one year imprisonment, Cami Baykurt 10 months, and Halil Lütfü Sahne to nine months and 10 days. They were arrested in February 1946 and sent to prison. The Sertels, Dört and Baykurt, who appealed the decision, were acquitted by the First Criminal Court of Appeals on 14 May 1946 and released after nearly four months of imprisonment. The Tan raid was not carried out solely to silence Tan, Fikirler, or the Sertels. With this incident, all opposition press organs and the Dörtler group, which turned into opposition to the CHP, were also intimidated, and they drew a line so that their future opposition would not develop in cooperation with this segment. In addition, the Tan Raid created an important opportunity for the government, which was trying to establish good relations with the US in the bipolar new world order and to benefit from military and economic aid such as the Marshall Plan to show that they were fighting the communist threat.
