= İctihad =

Cultural and political magazine in Ottoman Empire (1904–1932)

- Categories: Cultural magazine; Political magazine
- Frequency: Monthly; Biweekly; Weekly
- Founder: Abdullah Cevdet
- Founded: 1904
- First issue: 1 September 1904
- Final issue: December 1932
- Country: Switzerland; Khedivate of Egypt; Ottoman Empire; Turkey
- Based in: Geneva; Cairo; Istanbul
- Language: Ottoman Turkish

İctihad (Turkish: Public opinion, French: Idjtihad) was a cultural and political magazine which was started and published by Abdullah Cevdet, an Ottoman intellectual. It was established in Geneva, Switzerland, in 1904 and then appeared in Cairo. The magazine was headquartered in Istanbul between 1911 and 1932.

== History and profile ==
İctihad was first published in Geneva on 1 September 1904 featuring both Turkish and French articles. Its founder and editor was Abdullah Cevdet who founded it with the financial support of Ahmed Celâleddin Pasha. Cevdet was given permission by the Swiss government to start the magazine in August 1904. He was a member of the Committee of Union and Progress and was in exile in Geneva. He was expelled from Switzerland after the publication of the İctihad's second issue and then, the magazine was managed by Hüseyin Tosun for a while. The magazine moved to Cairo in 1906 where it was published until 1908. It was restarted in Istanbul in 1911.

The frequency of İctihad was monthly until 1906. It appeared on a biweekly basis in Cairo. It was redesigned as a weekly magazine from the issue 50 in Istanbul. However, it also came out biweekly from time to time.

İctihad was subject to temporary bans when it was headquartered in Istanbul. The longest closure of the magazine was between 13 February 1915 and 1 November 1918. The magazine was not also published from 1919 to 1921. The reason for its closures was its use of the derogatory language in regard to religious feelings of the people. During the national struggle period it did not support the Turkish forces led by Mustafa Kemal. However, it began to support the Turkish forces after November 1922.

İctihad folded in December 1932 one month after the death of Abdullah Cevdet and produced a total of 358 issues during its run.

== Ideology and content ==
The goal of İctihad was to inform people about cultural topics and to raise their awareness. It adopted a pro-Western ideology and frequently criticized veiling and traditional upbringing of women. The magazine was one of the fierce critics of the Ottoman Sultan Abdulhamit between 1904 and 1908. It also harshly criticized Turkish nationalism.

İctihad frequently published articles on Westernization or Europeanisation which were mostly written by Abdullah Cevdet and Celal Nuri. However, the latter became anti-European in 1914 and left İctihad. The magazine featured articles on Bahaism in the late 1921 and in the early 1922 which adopted a positive stance towards it. İctihad declared its guiding principles in the issue dated 15 April 1932 as follows: freedom, independence, peace, arts, equality, religion and conscience.

== Contributors ==
Various writers contributed to İctihad who did not share the same ideology. For instance, Rıza Tevfik was a traditionalist, but Jean-Marie Guyau and Gustave Le Bon were positivists. The philosophical approaches supported by the magazine contributors were Darwinism, Freudianism, and materialism.

Later the following notable figures contributed to the magazine: Süleyman Nazif, Tevfik Fikret, Faik Ali Ozansoy, Abdülhak Hâmid Tarhan, Ali Canip Yöntem, Ahmet Haşim, Cenâb Şehâbeddîn, Faruk Nafiz Çamlıbel, Enis Behiç Koryürek, Halide Edib Adıvar, Gaspıralı İsmâil, Halide Nusret Zorlutuna, Mehmet Fuat Köprülü, Ömer Seyfettin, Peyami Safa, Suut Kemal Yetkin, Reşat Nuri Güntekin, Selim Sırrı Tarcan, and Yakup Kadri Karaosmanoğlu. Peyami Safa started his journalistic career in the magazine at age fourteen in 1913.
