= Aşiyan Museum =

Museum in Istanbul

- Aşiyan Müzesi
- Location of Aşiyan Museum
- Established: 1945
- Location: Aşiyan Yokuşu, Beşiktaş, Istanbul
- Coordinates: 41.08265°N 29.05345°E
- Type: Historic house museum; poetry museum
- Owner: Istanbul Metropolitan Municipality

Aşiyan Museum (Turkish: Aşiyan Müzesi) is the house of famous Turkish poet Tevfik Fikret (1867–1915) in the Aşiyan quarter of Beşiktaş district in Istanbul. It was built in 1906 and later in 1945 converted to a museum. The museum is owned by the Istanbul Metropolitan Municipality.

== Building ==
Tevfik Fikret lived in the house from 1906 until his death in 1915. The building was acquired in 1940 by the municipality from his wife Nazime with the initiative of Lütfi Kırdar, Mayor and Governor of Istanbul, and was converted into a museum named Museum of New Literature (Ottoman Turkish: Edebiyat-ı Cedide Müzesi). The museum opened in 1945. The museum was renamed Aşiyan in 1961 after the remains of Tevfik Fikret, which initially were buried at the Eyüp Cemetery, were taken to his home's yard he liked very much due to its panoramic view of Bosporus.

Tevfik Fikret designed the architectural project of the house by himself, and named his house "Aşiyan", which means "nest" in Persian language. The house is a three-story wooden building within a garden.

== Museum ==
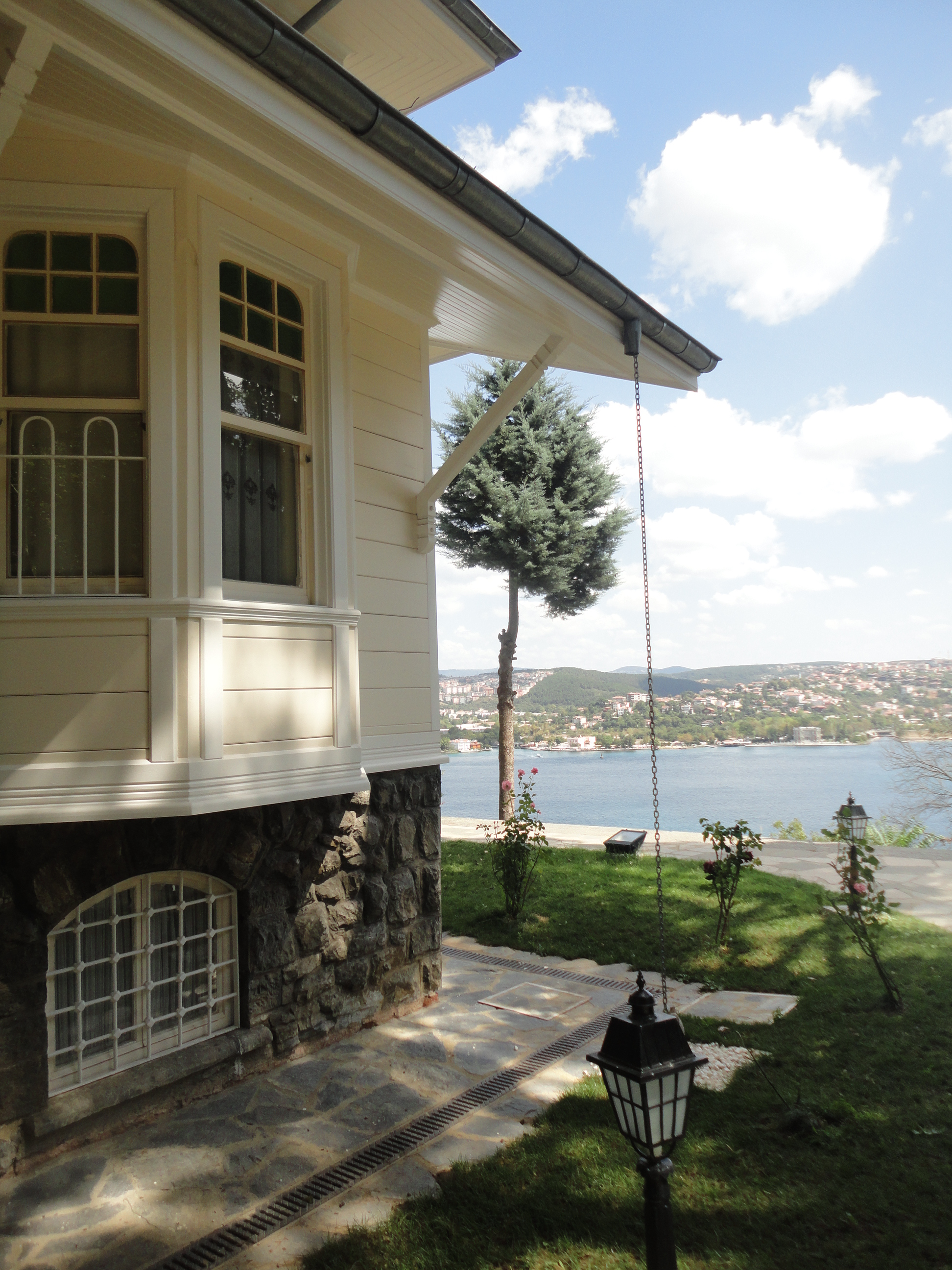
Aşiyan Museum, 2013

The ground floor consists of administrative offices. The first floor is reserved for Abdülhak Hâmid Tarhan (1851-1937) and female poet Nigar Hanım (1856-1918), poets of the "New Literature Movement". In two separate rooms, paintings, photographs, books and personal belongings of both poets are on display.

In the second floor, Tevfik Fikret's study and bedroom are situated. Here, his personal belongings, his writing desk, armchair, drawings and paintings made by him are exhibited. In the bedroom, a death mask of him is also on display. A painting of then Ottoman Shahzada Abdülmecid (1868-1944), which he created in inspiration of Tevfik Fikret's poem "Sis" (English: fog), hangs on the wall at this floor.

Aşiyan museum was restored completely, and reopened by Mayor Kadir Topbaş in December 2012 after one-and-half-year works costing ₺1.128 million (around US$640,000).

By the restoration, furniture remade after original photos and a wax sculpture of Tevfik Fikret were added to the museum.

== Admission ==
The museum is closed on Mondays. Visiting hours are 9:00-16:00. Admission is free of charge.
