= Ahmet Rasim =

Ottoman Turkish politician

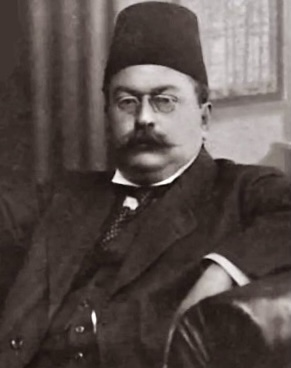
Ahmet Rasim

Ahmet Cavit Rasim (1864–1932) was an Ottoman liberal politician, composer, member of parliament and writer, who wrote primarily about social issues.

== Biography ==
Ahmet Cavit Rasim was born in Istanbul in 1864. He was a graduate of the Darüşşafaka High School. After graduation he worked as a civil servant for a short time. Then he also worked as a journalist, edited a humor magazine, and published books. He wrote in a neutral, apolitical tone and his writings were popular. He also translated some literary works and composed music. He worked for numerous publications, including Tercüman-ı Hakikat, Saadet, İkdam, Sabah, Malumat, Servet, Servet-i Fünun, Tanin, Hak, and Tasvîr-i Efkâr.

He died in 1932.

== Personal life ==
He married Sadberk Hanım during the early months of his civil service career; from this marriage, which lasted until his wife's death in 1902, he had four sons and two daughters.

It is observed that Mahmut Sırrı—the son of Ahmed Rasim, who did not have a surname because he passed away before the Surname Law—bore the surname "Arık".
