= Malumat =

Political weekly magazine in Ottoman Empire (1894–1903)

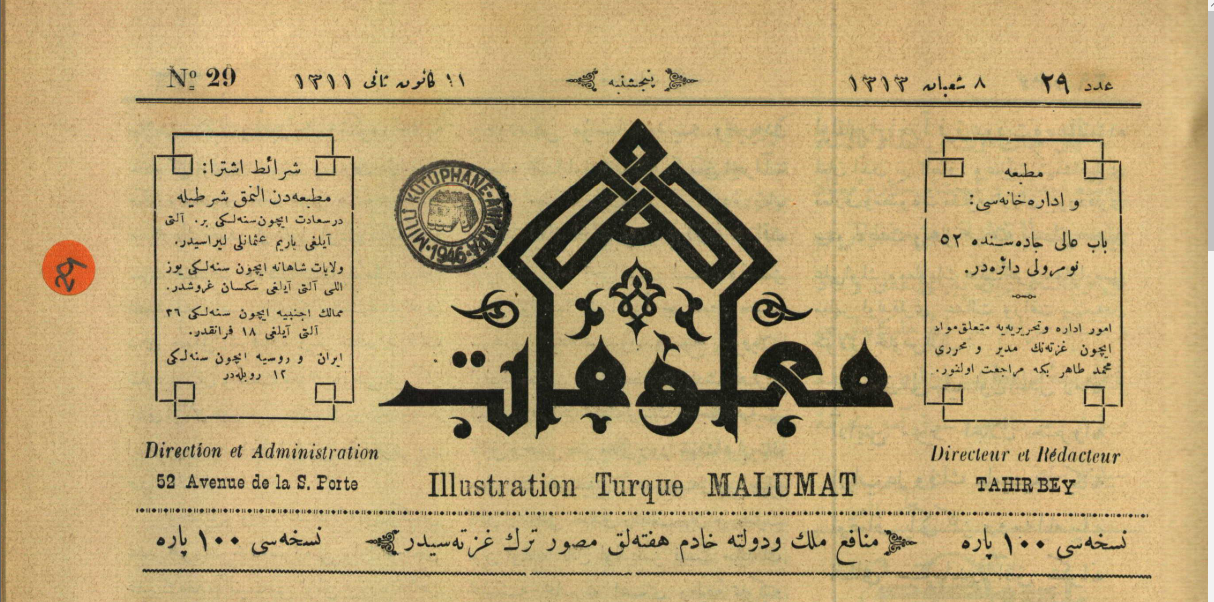

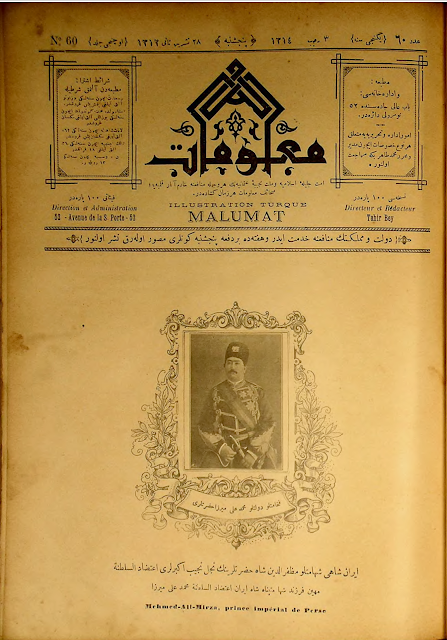
- Malûmat Issue 60, cover dated 1907
- Categories: Political magazine
- Frequency: Weekly
- Publisher: Ibn Hakkı Mehmet Tahir
- Founded: 1894
- First issue: February 1894
- Final issue: 1903
- Country: Ottoman Empire
- Based in: Istanbul
- Language: Ottoman Turkish; French
- OCLC: 24325961

Malumat (Ottoman Turkish: The Information), also known as Musavver Malumat (Ottoman Turkish: The Pictorial Information), was an Ottoman weekly literary and political magazine which was published in Istanbul in the period 1894–1903. It was circulated during the reign of Sultan Abdulhamit and was one of his supporters. Renée Worringer, a Canadian scholar on the Islamic and Middle East history, describes Malumat as the mouthpiece for Yıldız Palace which refers to the Hamidian era.

== History and profile ==
Malumat was started in 1894, and the first issue appeared in February 1894. Its license holder and publisher was Mehmet Tahir who was an ardent supporter of Sultan Abdulhamit with whom he had close connections. Another figure related to the magazine was Artin Asedoryan who was cited as the owner from 1895 to the 48th issue. Malumat appeared on Thursdays and billed itself as a literary, scientific and political journal. However, its political content became much more salient than its literary material. It contained both Ottoman Turkish and French articles. Notable contributors included Tevfik Fikret, Cenap Şahabettin, Ahmet Rasim, Yusuf Akçura, Hüseyin Cahit Yalçın, Ahmet Muhtar Paşa, Ahmet Mithat and Nazif Sururi.

In Beirut an Arabic edition of Malumat was published entitled Al Malumat. One of the rivals of Malumat was Servet-i Fünun, a progressive avant-garde Ottoman literary magazine.

Malumat, Al Malumat and Servet, a newspaper also published by Mehmet Tahir, covered news accusing the Dutch colonial rule of being hostile to the Muslims living in the Dutch East Indies, including Java. Upon these news the Dutch ambassador Wilhelm Ferdinand Heinrich von Weckherlin sent a note to the Sultan demanding the cancellation of these publications. The request of the Dutch was followed for a while, but the news continued from 1901. Malumat folded in 1903.
