= Orhan Karaveli =

Turkish journalist and writer (1930–2023)

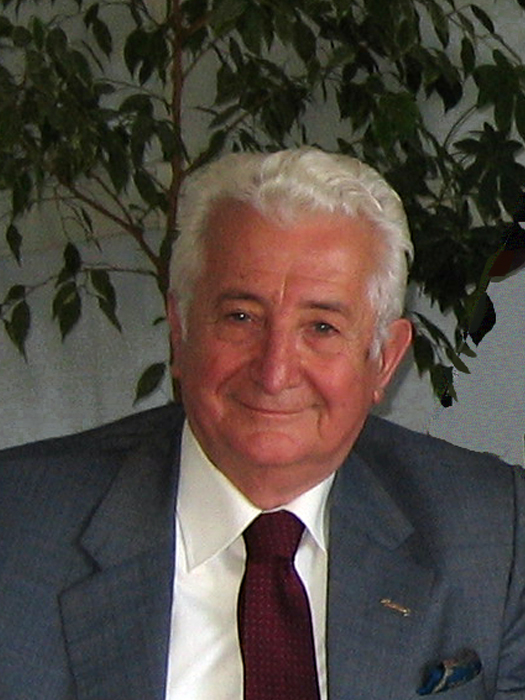
- Karaveli in 2007
- Born: 25 February 1930; Ankara, Turkey
- Died: 24 March 2023 (aged 93)
- Education: Galatasaray High School
- Occupations: Journalist, writer
- Known for: Biographies
- Spouse: Serpil Karaveli
- Children: 3
- Awards: 2004 Burhan Felek award

Orhan Karaveli (25 February 1930 – 24 March 2023) was a Turkish journalist and writer.

== Personal life ==
Orhan Karaveli's family was a member of the Karaevli Turkmen tribe. Their surname reflects their tribe name with a transposition of two letters. Orhan Karaveli was born to Mahmut and his wife Rafia in Ankara on 26 February 1930. He attended İstiklal Primary School in 1936. But the next year, he was transferred to Galatasaray Primary School in Istanbul. He continued his secondary education at Galatasaray High School util 1949. Although he began studying in the law school of Istanbul University, he paused his military service in the anti-aircraft school. He resumed his university education in 1954. He also studied at the University of Westminster for one year.

He was married and a father of three.

== Career ==
Karaveli began his journalism career while he was still at the university. His first paid article was published in the periodical Her Hafta in 1948 about a reclusive man in Uludağ (a mountain close to Bursa). He served in the newspaper Yeni İstanbul between 1950 and 1954. During this period he also supported his elder brother Nihat Karaveli in publishing the first sexual health periodical Cinsi Bilgiler Mecmuası (beginning in April 1949) for 60 months. In 1955, he moved to Berlin and London to serve for three years as the European correspondent of the daily Milliyet for three years. While in London, he frequently flew to Cyprus for Cyprus-issue news. After returning home, he became a part-time correspondent for News Chronicle in Turkey Later, he also served for the Vatan newspaper. While he was working for Vatan he was sent to the United States for two and a half months in 1959. He spent a part of his visit at Professor John A. Garraty's house who was a friend of his. He accompanied Adnan Menderes, the Turkish Prime Minister, in his visits to the United States. Some of his other notable foreign visits and interviews were to Cuba during the early days of the Communist rule, in 1960 to Soviet Union to watch a congress of Orientalism in which he interviewed Nazım Hikmet, in 1961 to SFR Yugoslavia to watch the 1st Summit of the Non-Aligned Movement in which he spoke to Jawaharlal Nehru and Josip Broz Tito. In the 1960s, after his father had a stroke, he undertook his father's business, mainly mining. After improving the business, he returned to journalism and served as a reporter and columnist for Cumhuriyet. In 1977 and 1998, he received the Turkey Journalists Association Achievement Award. He was a member of the Turkish Journalists Association and had a Press Honor Card (Basın şeref kartı).

== Works ==
Orhan Karaveli wrote twelve books:

- Kişiler ve Köşeler (1982) His impressions about the US (when he accompanied the Turkish prime minister Adnan Menderes to the US in 1959)
- Bir Ankara Ailesinin Öyküsü ( 1999) Memories about his childhood in Ankara
- 1946-1999 Şiirler (1999) poems
- Görgü Tanığı (2001) His memories as a writer
- Tanıdığım Nazım Hikmet (2002) Biography of the Turkish poet Nazım Hikmet
- Sakallı Celal (2004) Biography of the Turkish philosopher Celal Yalınız
- Tevfik Fikret ve Haluk Gerçeği (2004) Biography of the Turkish poet Tevfik Fikret and his son Haluk
- Ziya Gökalp'i Doğru Tanımak (2008) Biography of Ziya Gökalp, a man of letters
- Ali Kemal Belki de Günah Keçisi (2009): Biography of Ali Kemal a journalist who was lynched
- Berlin'in Yalnız Kadınları (2012) About the women in 1950s Berlin
- Kendi heykelini Yapan Adam İlhan Selçuk (2012) Biography of the Turkish journalist İlhan Selçuk
- O Olmasaydı (2014) About the Gallipoli Campaign

== Sources ==
- Karaveli, Orhan (2006). Bir Ankara Ailesinin Öyküsü. İstanbul: Pergamon. ISBN 975-96826-0-5.
- Karaveli, Orhan (2001). Görgü Tanığı. İstanbul: Pergamon. ISBN 975-96826-2-1.
- "Biography net".
- "Elit Kitap". Elit Kitap.
- "Go Turkey". Ministry ıf Culture.
