= Gurbet Hikayeleri =

Short story collection by Refik Halit Karay

Gurbet Hikayeleri (Stories of Abroad)
- Author: Refik Halit Karay
- Language: Turkish
- Publication date: 1940
- Publication place: Turkey
- Media type: Print

Gurbet Hikâyeleri (Stories of Abroad) is a short story collection by Refik Halit Karay, published in 1940. Gurbet Hikayeleri consists of 17 stories, one of which takes place in Siberia and the rest in different parts of the Middle East. The author, who started writing with small prose pieces, achieved his real fame with his Memleket and Gurbet Hikayeleri. After Gurbet Hikayeleri, he did not produce any works in the short story genre. He explained this situation with the difficulty of writing a story.

== Composition and publication ==
The author wrote the stories in his book while he was in exile in Beirut, Aleppo and Hatay between 1930 and 1937. There are traces of the author's life in his stories. "Şerif Aktaş", "Akrep", "Köpek", "Çıban", "Lavrens", "Güneş Çarpması", "Keklik", "Hülle", "Antikacı" were published in Tan newspaper in 1939 under the title "Hafta Musahâbeleri". Ali Birinci added the stories "Zincir" and "Istanbul" to the list of articles published in Tan newspaper. These articles were brought together and published in 1940 in the book titled Gurbet Hikayeleri. On the other hand, the stories titled "Dil Bahsi", "Fırat Kayıkçıları", "Kiraza Çileğe Dair" and "Şerbete Dair, which were published in the Tan newspaper in 1939 under the title "Memories of Abroad", were not included in the book.

== Reception ==
Ahmet Kabaklı about Memleket Hikayeleri and Gurbet Hikayeleri: "Their style is exquisite, their events are attractive, and especially their depictions of the environment are very successful, and the technique is also strong." Osman Nuri Ekiz, who studied Karay, argued that these works cannot be surpassed technically even today, and that Refik Halit is unique in terms of his command of the language and his ability to use it. Nihad Sami Banarlı drew attention to the perfection of the author's language.

== Contents ==
There are a total of 17 stories in Gurbet Hikayeleri. These stories:

- "Yara"
- "Eskici"
- "Antikacı"
- "Testi"
- "Fener"
- "Zincir"
- "Gözyaşı"
- "Keklik"
- "Akrep"
- "Köpek"
- "Lavrens"
- "Çıban"
- "Kaçak"
- "Güneş"
- "Hülle"
- "İstanbul"
- "Dişçi"
