= Behic =

Behic (and its variant Behiç) is a masculine given name and a surname. Its feminine version is Behice. Notable people with the name Behic include:

== Given name ==
=== First name ===
- Behiç Erkin (1876–1961), Turkish military officer and politician

=== Middle name ===
- Hakkı Behiç Bayiç (1886–1943), Turkish politician
- Enis Behiç Koryürek (1891–1949), Turkish writer and diplomat

== Surname ==
- Aziz Behiç (born 1990), Australian soccer player
- Louis Henri Armand Behic (1809–1891), French lawyer, businessman and politician
