= Dün ve Bugün =

Weekly political and history magazine in Turkey (1955–1956)

- Categories: Political magazine; History magazine
- Frequency: Weekly
- Publisher: Ekicigil Publishing House
- Founder: Eşref Ekicigil; Feridun Kandemir
- Founded: 1955
- First issue: 4 November 1955
- Final issue: 5 December 1956
- Country: Turkey
- Based in: Istanbul
- Language: Turkish

Dün ve Bugün (Turkish: Yesterday and Today) was a weekly illustrated history and political magazine which was in circulation between 1955 and 1956. The magazine is known for its opposition to the ruling Democrat Party (DP).

== History and profile ==
Dün ve Bugün was first published in Istanbul on 4 November 1955. The magazine was established by Eşref Ekicigil and Feridun Kandemir and was published by the Ekicigil publishing House on a weekly basis. As a reference to its title it included reports on recent history of Turkey and included many analyses on the Independence Tribunal.

Shortly after its start Dün ve Bugün became one of the critics of the DP. As a result of its harsh criticism against the DP the page number of the magazine gradually decreased since the magazine experienced a serious paper shortage.

Its regular contributors were leading opposition figures, including Nurettin Artam, Altan Tan, Hüsnü Oğuz Erkmen, Kemal Yalaz, Nizamettin Nazif Tepedelenlioğlu, Sadettin Işık, Raif Karadağ and Burhan Felek. Some former DP members such as Fuat Köprülü, Muhlis Ete, Fevzi Lütfi Karaosmanoğlu and Refik Koraltan wrote for the magazine. The magazine also republished articles of Yakup Kadri Karaosmanoğlu, Hüseyin Cahit Yalçın, Namık Zeki Aral ve Hicret Cambazoğlu which had been featured in Ulus. It also contained interviews with major opposition figures, including Şemsettin Günaltay and Fethi Çelikbaş.

Dün ve Bugün folded on 5 December 1956 after forty-eight issues.

== Legacy ==
All issues of Dün ve Bugün are archived by the Babacan Library.
