= Tan (newspaper) =

Turkish newspaper (1935–1945)

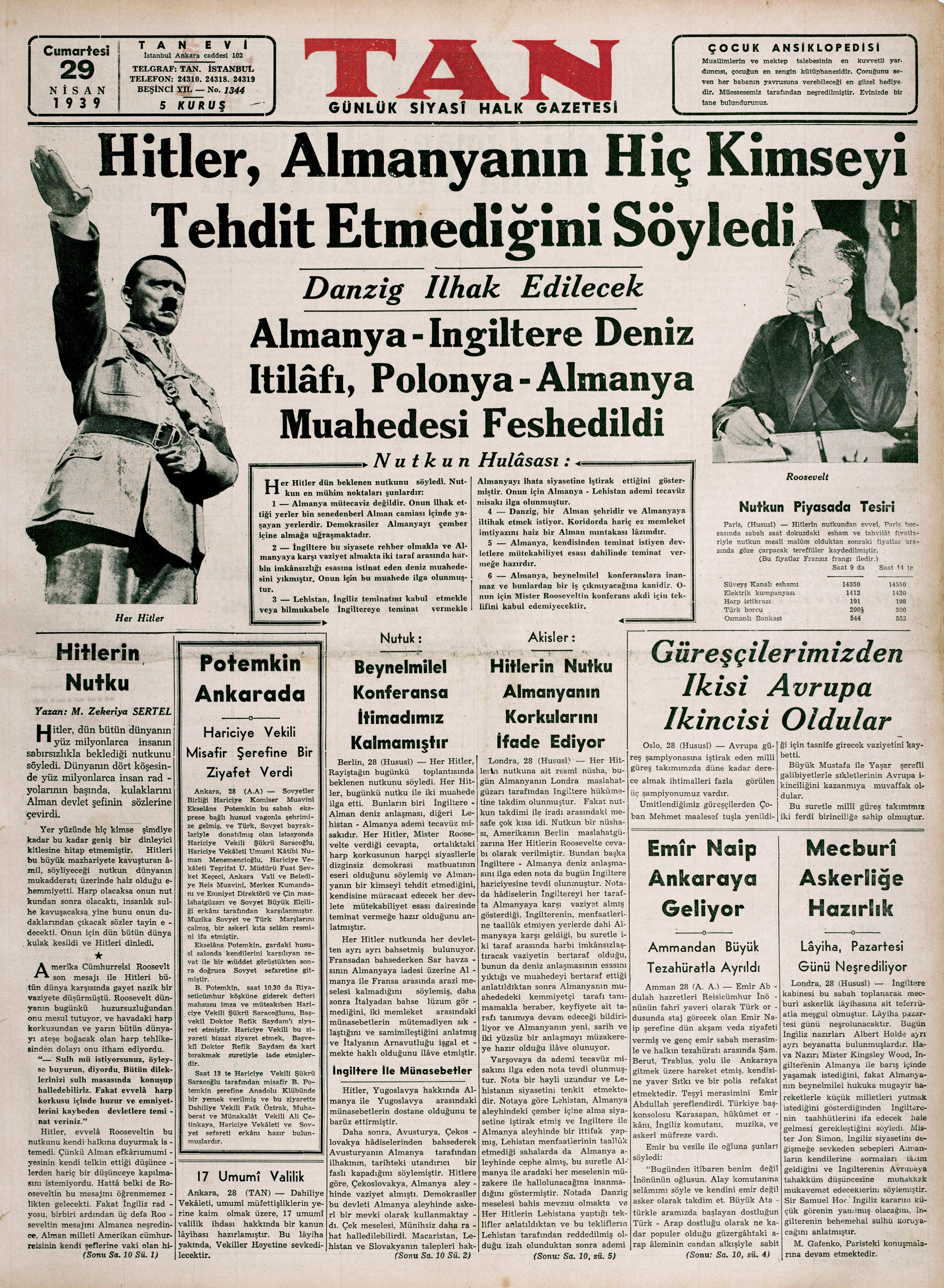
- Tan front page dated 29 April 1939, the headline reads: “Hitler Says Germany Threatens Noone.”
- Type: Daily newspaper
- Publisher: İş Bankası Publications
- Founded: 15 July 1935
- Ceased publication: December 1945
- Political alignment: Leftist
- Language: Turkish
- Headquarters: Istanbul
- Country: Turkey

Tan (Turkish: Dawn) was a Turkish newspaper based in Istanbul, Turkey, which existed for ten years between 1935 and 1945. The paper has been known for the attacks against its offices due to the allegations of being a communist publication in December 1945. It is also known for its editors, Zekeriya and Sabiha Sertel.

== History and profile ==
=== Beginnings ===
Tan was launched by İş Bankası Publications (a publishing company of a state bank, İş Bankası) in 1935, and the first issue appeared on 15 July 1935. The founding editor-in-chief was a well-known Turkish novelist Yakup Kadri Karaosmanoğlu who served in the post until 1938. He also became the publisher of the paper in 1936 through a publishing company he established. The contributors of Tan during this period included Burhan Felek, Fikret Adil, Eşref Şefik, Refi Cevat Ulunay, Refik Halit, Niyazi Berkes, Sabiha Sertel and Ahmet Emin Yalman. The latter contributed to the paper from 1936, and his writings were anti-Fascist and anti-Nazi. In 1938 the paper was closed down by the government for three months due to Yalman's articles in which he announced the deteriorating health of the Turkish President Mustafa Kemal Atatürk. Following this incident Yalman left the paper.

=== The Sertels period ===
Then Zekeriya and Sabiha Sertel began to guide the paper, and Halil Lütfü Dördüncü funded it. Notable contributors of Tan under the Sertels included Niyazi Berkes, his wife Mediha Esenel, Aziz Nesin and Behice Boran.

Sertels adopted a critical approach against the government denouncing the slowness of the reform activities. The paper also openly criticized the fascist ideology that was popular at the period. As a result Tan became the most significant media outlet for leftists in Turkey and had a pro-Soviet stance. It published interviews with the leading international figures, including Bogdan Filov, prime minister of the Kingdom of Bulgaria, in 1940.

The anti-Nazi approach of Tan led to its boycott by major German companies which had investments in Turkey, including Bayer and the Daimler Benz. In the period of World War II Tan sold 10,000-12,000 copies making it one of the three best selling newspapers in Turkey.

=== Tan incident and aftermath ===
Hüseyin Cahit Yalçın published an article in Tanin newspaper on 3 December 1945 calling for a struggle against communism. Upon this nearly 20,000 university students attacked the headquarters of Tan in Cağaloğlu, Istanbul, on 4 December. In the attack the offices of the paper were destructed. Shortly after this incident, which is called the incident of 4 December and the Tan raid, Tan ceased publication.

The destruction of the paper's offices and its closure had very negative effects on the relations between Turkey and the Soviet Union, and on 8 December the Soviet Union officially condemned the raid during which a bookstore of a Soviet citizen in Istanbul was also destroyed.
