= Mediha Esenel =

Turkish sociologist, writer and journalist (1914–2005)

- Born: 1914; Istanbul, Ottoman Empire
- Died: 26 August 2005 (aged 90–91); Istanbul, Turkey
- Education: Erenköy Girls High School; Istanbul University
- Spouse: Niyazi Berkes
- Children: Fikret Berkes
- Scientific career
- Fields: Sociology
- Workplaces: Ankara University

Mediha Esenel (1914 – 2005) was a Turkish sociologist, writer and journalist. She was a faculty member of Ankara University until January 1947 when she resigned from her teaching post during the purge of leftist academics.

== Early life and education ==
She was born in Istanbul in 1914. She was educated at the Erenköy Girls High School. She received a degree in philosophy from Istanbul University in 1935. Then she went to the United States with her husband, Niyazi Berkes, and took courses on sociology, folklore, and archeology from the University of Chicago. She received her PhD from Ankara University, and her thesis was on superstitions.

== Career and activities ==
Following their return to Turkey she and her husband joined the Faculty of Language, History and Geography of Ankara University in 1939. She first worked as a research assistant at the department of folk literature and folklore. Then she became a sociology lecturer at the institute of philosophy. She carried out research on rural sociology. She resigned from her teaching post on 7 January 1947 shortly after the dismissal of her husband and other academics from the faculty. She established a daily newspaper, 24 Saat (Turkish: 24 Hours), of which the first issue appeared on 22 February 1947. Its editor-in-chief was Adnan Cemgil, and the paper lasted only 13 days until 6 March 1947.

Then she began to work as a translator. In 1953 she went to Canada where her husband had been living. There she worked at a library and returned to Turkey in 1954. Esenel was employed as a translator at the Denizcilik Bankası (Turkish: Maritime Bank) between 1955 and 1960. She left the job and joined the Robert College in 1960 where she worked as a teacher of philosophy and sociology. In 1972 she retired and continued her visits to villages in Anatolia.

== Work ==
She was a regular contributor of İsmail Hakkı Baltacıoğlu's journal, Yeni Adam, between 1937 and 1946. During her studies at Ankara University she contributed to the newspapers Vatan and Tan. She published 22 articles in Yurt ve Dünya during this period. Following her resignation from Ankara University in 1948 she wrote a textbook targeting primary school students. Her memoir was published in 1999: Geç Kalmış Bir Kitap (Turkish: A Late Book).

== Personal life and death ==
She married Niyazi Berkes with whom she had a son, Fikret. They divorced in 1954. Esenel died in Istanbul on 26 August 2005.
