= Fikret Berkes =

Canadian ecologist

Fikret Berkes (born 1945) is a Turkish-Canadian ecologist. He is a Distinguished Professor Emeritus at the University of Manitoba's Natural Resources Institute. Berkes studies community-based natural resources management in societies around the world.

== Early life and education ==
Berkes was born in Istanbul, Turkey, in 1945. His parents are Niyazi Berkes and Mediha Esenel. He received his Bachelor of Science degree from McGill University, Montreal, Canada, in 1968. He obtained a Ph.D. in marine sciences from the same university in 1973.

== Career ==
In 1974, rather than continuing on with a postdoctoral position in marine ecology, Berkes worked with an anthropologist, Harvey Feit, studying the fishing practices of the Cree.

Berkes taught at Brock University, then became the Director of the NRI at the University of Manitoba in 1991.

== Awards ==
In 2014, Berkes won the Sustainability Science Award of the Ecological Society of America for his third (2012) edition of Sacred Ecology.

He has also been awarded the International Union for Conservation of Nature CEESP Inaugural Award for Meritorious Research (2016) and the IASC Elinor Ostrom Award for Senior Scholar (2015).

== Selected publications ==
- Berkes, F. (2017). Sacred Ecology (4th ed.). Routledge. https://doi.org/10.4324/9781315114644
- Berkes, F., Colding, J., & Folke, C. (Eds.). (2008). Navigating social-ecological systems: building resilience for complexity and change. Cambridge University Press.
- Berkes, F., Colding, J., & Folke, C. (2000). Rediscovery of traditional ecological knowledge as adaptive management. Ecological applications, 10(5), 1251-1262.
- Berkes, F., Folke, C., & Colding, J. (Eds.). (2000). Linking social and ecological systems: management practices and social mechanisms for building resilience. Cambridge University Press.
