= Shukufezar =

Şükûfezar
- Editor: Ârife
- Frequency: Fortnightly
- First issue: 1884 or 1886
- Country: Ottoman Empire
- Language: Ottoman Turkish

Şükûfezar was a women's magazine published in Istanbul in 1884 or 1886. (Note: According to researcher Fatma Tunç Yaşar, there is some confusion in the dating of the magazine. The first page of the first issue is dated Rumi 1301, while the outer cover is dated 1303. Therefore, its publication year is stated as 1884 in some sources and 1886 in others.) It was the first Muslim women's magazine in the Ottoman Empire owned and written entirely by women. Unlike previous publications aimed at women, it was not a supplement to any newspaper or publication, but an independent journal published for women by women; due to this characteristic, it is accepted as the "first Muslim women's magazine."

The magazine was published with an effort to encourage women toward science and education, driven by a desire to awaken and activate them. The license holder of the magazine was Ârife Hanım, daughter of the Minister of Education at the time, Münif Mehmed Pasha, and its other writers were Fatma Nevber and Münire.

== Content ==
In the magazine, of which five issues have survived to the present day, works of various genres by Ârife, Fatma Nevber, and Münire, as well as letters from readers, were published. Although the editorial staff was limited to three people, the magazine took shape through reader letters and the responses given to them. The reader letters were mostly from graduates of Darülmuallimat, the teacher training school for women of the period. Although it was not a literary magazine, literary works were included in it. In the fourth issue, a poem by Fatma Nigar was published.

Each issue consisted of 16 pages, and the total of the issues that have survived to the present day is eighty pages. Since only the year was given as the date, it is unknown how frequently it was published; however, it was announced in its first issue that it would be published every 15 days. All five surviving issues are located in the Özege Collection at the library of Atatürk University in Erzurum.

According to what was stated in the first issue, the name Şükûfezâr, which means "flower garden," was given by the poet Abdülkerim Sabit Bey. On the cover of each issue, the following quatrain by Sheikh Vasfi was featured:

O seeker of the purity of meaning,
Look upon the flower garden (Şükûfezar) with faith.
The fragrance of the flowers of etiquette does not fade;
Those of heart prefer etiquette over spring.

— (Note: Modern Turkish translation of the quatrain: "Ey gerçek mananın talebesi. Çiçek bahçesine (şükufezara) iman ile bak. Edeb çiçeklerinin kokusu solmaz. Gönül ehli edebi, bahara tercih eder.")

In each issue of the magazine, the following statement as a preface explained the mission of the journal:

We are a group who have been the target of men's mocking laughter as "long-haired and short-witted." We will try to prove the opposite of this. Without preferring manhood to womanhood or womanhood to manhood, we will remain as steadfast as possible on the great path of effort and knowledge.

— (Note: Modern Turkish simplified text: "Biz; saçı uzun, aklı kısa denilerek erkeklerin alaycı gülüşlerine hedef olan bir tayfayız. Erkekliği kadınlığa, kadınlığı erkekliğe tercih etmeyerek bunun aksini ispat etmeye çalışacağız!")

== See also ==
- Hanımlara Mahsus Gazete
