= Sociology in Turkey =

Sociology in Turkey has gone through several stages of development beginning with proto-sociologies in the 16th and 17th century. In the mid-19th century, sociology was taught within philosophy departments, and it uncritically adopted Western social theories and neglected research. In reaction to the rise of Western liberalism among several intellectuals, the Sultan supported sociology and opened the Dârülfünûn. The resulting division between Western liberalism and Pan-Islamism ultimately resulted in the Young Turk Revolution of 1908.

Following the 1908 revolution, sociological thinkers attempted to discern the foundations of Europeanization so as to graft Western social organization onto Ottoman institutions and Turkish culture. The sociologists of the time were heavily influenced by European, mainly French, sociologists. During and after the events leading to the Turkish War of Independence (1919-1923), the purported father of Turkish sociology, Ziya Gökalp, argued for a break from Ottoman and Western ideologies. Instead he contended that Pan-Turkism was the appropriate basis of the new nation-state, which influenced the Kemalist foundation of modern Turkey. This connection between sociology and the development of the nation-state continues to be a strong theme in contemporary sociological thought in Turkey. Sociology in Turkey was again influenced heavily by the influx of German thinkers during the Second World War and later by American sociology. Today, Turkish sociology is taught as the study of social problems using scientific research methods.

Although there have been six different associations established to further social thought in Turkey, the current Turkish Sociological Association was established in 1990 in Ankara with 40 members, by 2010 the association had 600 members. The association began publishing one bi-annual, peer-reviewed journal, the Journal of Social Research (Sosyoloji Araştırmaları Dergisi) in 1998.

== Origins ==
=== Mustafa Reşid Pasha ===
Mustafa Reşid Pasha (1779–1858) was an Ottoman statesman and diplomat, known best as the chief architect behind the Ottoman government reforms known as Tanzimat. He was the ambassador to France and the United Kingdom where he came into contact with Western social thought. He specifically communicated with Silvestre de Sacy and Auguste Comte. "His communication with Comte concerning methods of improving Ottoman government and society may very well represent the first direct contact of an Ottoman leader with Western sociological thought."

=== Ahmed Riza and Positivism ===
Ahmed Riza (1858-1930), educated in prestigious institutions, embraced Western European intellectual currents during his studies in Paris. Influenced by sociologists such as Comte, Durkheim and Spencer, he applied sociological principles to analyze and address the empire's social, economic, and political challenges. His seminal work, the journal Meşveret (Consultancy) proposed reforms emphasizing education, modernization, and social justice. Furthermore, Riza actively participated in politics as a key figure in the Young Turk movement, which aimed to establish a constitutional monarchy and bring about political reforms. As a member of the Committee of Union and Progress, he contributed to the Young Turk Revolution of 1908 and subsequently served as president of the Chamber of Deputies. Riza was a follower of Comte's positivism.

=== Prince Sabahaddin and Le Play ===
Prince Sabahaddin studied in Paris from 1904 to 1906 with the followers of the Le Play school under Henri de Tourville.

== Modern ==
=== Ziya Gökalp and Pan-Turkism ===
In the wake of the Young Turk Revolution several Turkish intellectuals were searching for a path forward. Many of the key players in the Pan-Turkish movement drew on French social thought. For instance, Yusuf Akçura (1876–1935) was exiled from Istanbul to Tripoli in 1896, but fled to Paris in 1899 where he studied under French historian Albert Sorel and the sociologist and political scientist Emile Boutmy.

Ziya Gökalp (1875-1924) is considered by some to be the real founder of Turkish sociology, as he established novel lines of theory, rather than just translate or interpret foreign sociology. Much of his work is based on that of Durkheim and he translated into Turkish the work of mostly French thinkers, which included, in addition to Durkheim, Lucien Levy-Bruhl, Paul Fauconnet, and Marcel Mauss. The first chair of sociology in Turkey was established at the University of Istanbul (known as Dârülfünûn until 1933) specifically for Gökalp, where he first began teaching sociology in 1912. In 1915, he established a sociological research institute (İçtimaiyyat Dârül-Mesaisi) and Turkey's first Journal of Sociology (Iimaiyat Mecmuasi). As Niyazi Berkes argues, "In reality, all Turkish sociologists of recent times [1936] are direct or indirect disciples of Gökalp."

Gökalp was struggling with the main issue of his time - how to proceed from the decline of the Ottoman Empire - and his answer was a distinctly "nationalist sociology." He contended that "traditions" are ways of behavior imposed on individuals by the common elements of their civilization." In this case, civilization was the empire which brought diverse groups together. Culture, on the other hand, was composed of the "mores" of a particular national/ethnic group, and were largely sentimental. "Social problems" emerged when there were conflicts between "traditions" and "mores". Thus, "When the "traditions" of a particular civilization are in accord with the "mores" of a particular nation, they become incorporated in "institutions"; otherwise they remain mere "fossils." He argued that "nations" are first "ethnic groups", and begin to feel their uniqueness once again as the imperial state dissolves, although their identity loses much of its originality and character while under the subjugation of civilization.

He argued for a break from Ottoman and Western ideologies, but also the Islamic ideology of the Arab empires. Instead he concluded that Pan-Turkism was the appropriate basis of the new nation-state and those elements of Western and Islamic culture that complimented the Turkish culture would be adopted and the rest discarded. This came to be known by the tripartite slogan: "Turkify, Islamize, Modernize", adapted from his series of articles published in the journal Turk Yurdu from 1912 to 1914, later compiled into a book entitled Turkification-Islamization-Modernization (Türkleşmek-İslamlaşmak-Muasırlaşmak), published in 1918. He adopted the slogan from the Azerbaijani intellectual Ali bey Huseynzade, "one of his most important teachers." This heavily influenced the Turkish National Movement and the Kemalist foundation of the modern Republic of Turkey.

== See also ==
- Şerif Mardin
