= Hayrullah Efendi =

Ottoman physician, historian, and official (1820–1866)

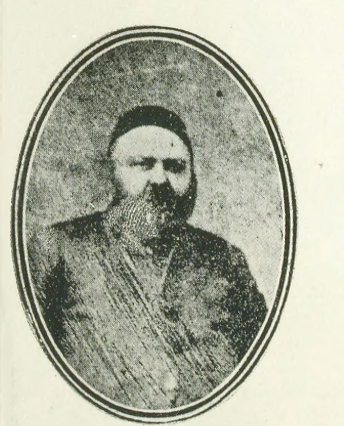

Ottoman ambassador to Qajar Iran
- In office 1865 – 25 December 1866
- Monarch: Abdulaziz

Personal details
- Born: 26 October 1818 Constantinople, Ottoman Empire
- Died: 25 December 1866 (aged 48) Tehran, Qajar Iran
- Resting place: Shah Abdol-Azim Shrine, Ray, Iran
- Children: Abdülhak Hâmid Tarhan
- Parent: Abdulhak Molla (father)

Hayrullah Efendi (26 October 1818 – 25 December 1866) was an Ottoman historian, medical doctor, and statesman, who served as the Ottoman ambassador to Iran from 1865 until his death.

== Early life and education ==
He was born on 26 October 1818 to Abdulhak Molla, a renowned physician, from the well-known Hekimbaşılar ulema family in Constantinople, Ottoman Empire. Hayrullah Efendi completed his medical training in 1843.

== Career ==
Hayrullah Efendi worked for the Ottoman government in several positions. He traveled to Europe due to a medical issue in 1863 and gathered his observations in his Yolculuk Kitabı (lit. 'Journey Book'). He died in Tehran on 25 December 1866. He was buried at the Shah Abdol-Azim Shrine in Ray after a major funeral organized Naser al-Din Shah Qajar (r. 1848–96). His son was Abdülhak Hâmid Tarhan.

== Works ==
=== Medicine ===
- Beyt-i Dihkani
- Durûr-ü'l-muhat
- Lûgat-ı Tıbbiye
- Makalat-ı Tıbbiye
- Mecmua-i Mualecat
- Müfredat-ı Tıbbiye fi Beyan-ı Evzaü'l-Edviye
- Terbiye ve Tedavi-i Etfal (Sıhhatnüma-i Etfal)

== Bibliography ==
- Akün, Ömer Faruk (1998). "Hayrullah Efendi". TDV Encyclopedia of Islam, Vol. 17 (Hayal – Hi̇lâfi̇yat) (in Turkish). Istanbul: Presidency of Religious Affairs, Centre for Islamic Studies. pp. 67–75. ISBN 978-975-389-444-9.
- Kalın, İbrahim (16 July 2015). "Hayrullah Efendi". In Leaman, Oliver (ed.). The Biographical Encyclopedia of Islamic Philosophy. Bloomsbury Publishing. pp. 143–144. ISBN 9781472569462.
- Özaydın, Zuhal (1995). "Tanzimat Devri Hekimi Hayrullah Efendi Hayati ve Eserleri II" [Hayrullah Efendi, a physician of the Reformation Period (Tanzimat): his life and works]. Yeni Tıp Tarihi Araştırmaları (in Turkish). 1: 98–132. PMID 11625088.
