= Aşiyan station =

Funicular station in Istanbul, Turkey

Aşiyan
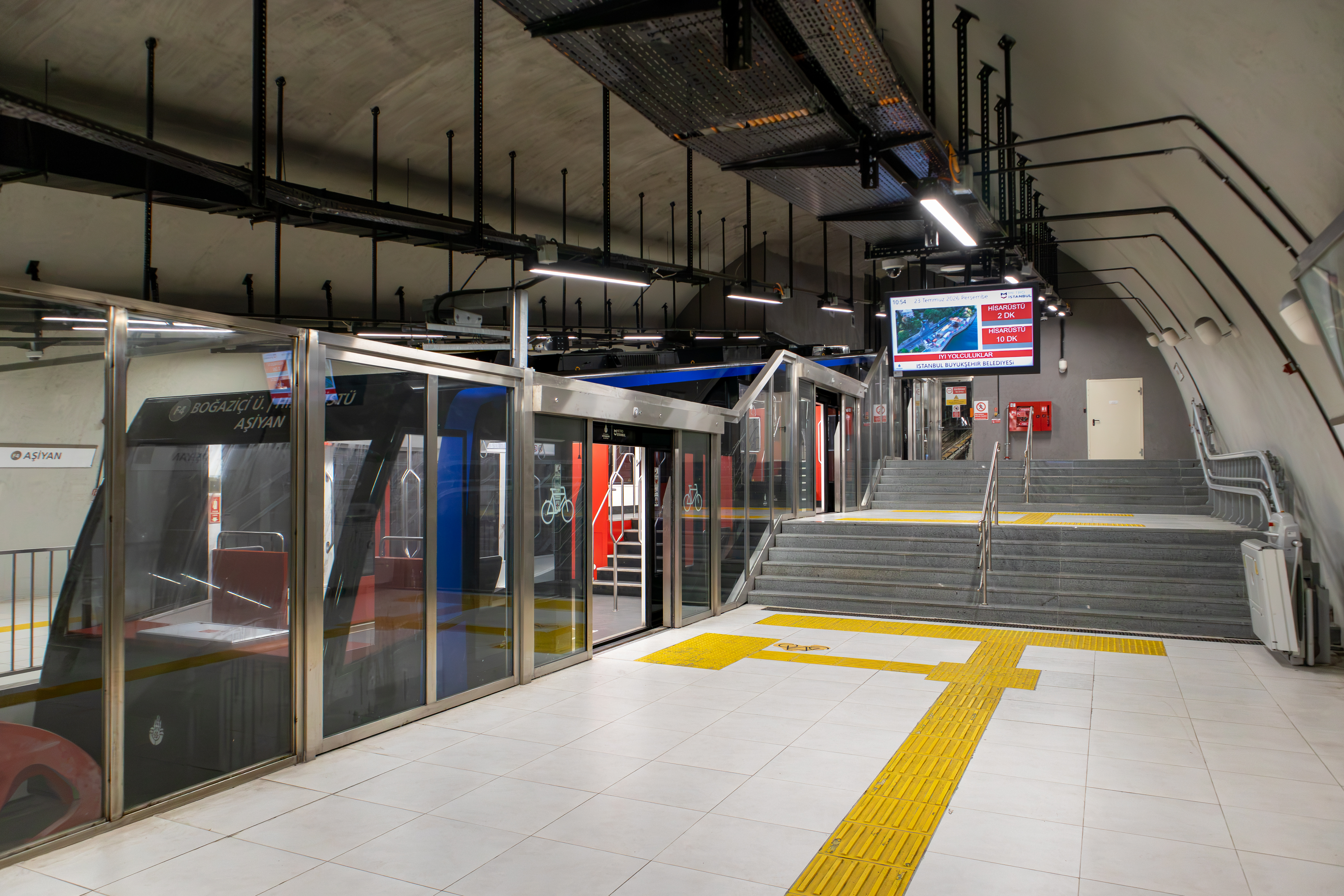

General information
- Location: Cevdet Paşa Cd., Bebek Mah., 34342; Beşiktaş
- Coordinates: 41.0811°N 29.0538°E
- System: Istanbul Metro rapid transit station
- Owner: Istanbul Metropolitan Municipality
- Operator: Metro Istanbul
- Line: F4
- Platforms: 1 bay platform
- Tracks: 1
- Connections: İETT Bus: 22, 22RE, 25E, 40T, 42T

Construction
- Structure type: Underground
- Accessible: Yes

History
- Opened: 28 October, 2022

Services
Preceding station	Istanbul Metro	Following station
Boğaziçi Üniversitesi Terminus	F4	Terminus
Location

Aşiyan is an underground station and the eastern terminus of the F4 funicular line of the Istanbul Metro in Beşiktaş, Istanbul. The station is located in the Aşiyan quarter, along Cevdet Paşa Avenue on the Bosphorus strait in Bebek. The station opened on 28 October, 2022.
