= Anatoli (newspaper) =

Anatoli (Ανατολή) was a Karamanli Turkish (Turkish with Greek characters) newspaper published by Evangelinos Misalaides, the first in that language made in the Ottoman Empire. It operated 1850–1922, making it the one in that language with the longest length of publication. N. T. Soullides later became the editor.

Anatoli favoured Sultan of the Ottoman Empire Abdulhamid II and promoted institutions of higher education set up during his rule.

== See also ==
- Media of the Ottoman Empire
- Servet - A newspaper originally intended to be in Karamanli Turkish
