= Aşiyan =

Quarter of Istanbul, Turkey

Coordinates: 41°4′57″N 29°3′8″E

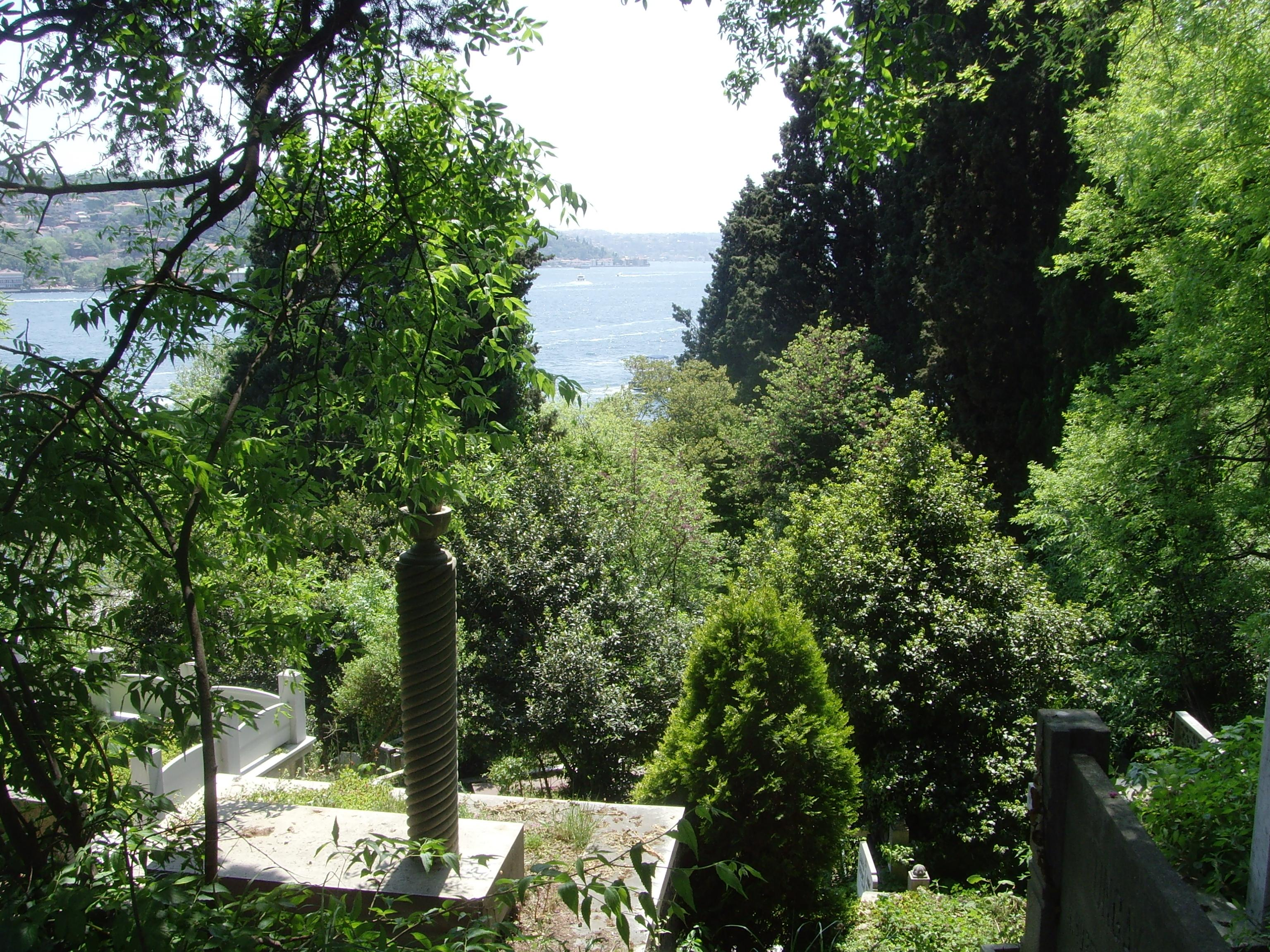
View of the Bosphorus from Aşiyan

Aşiyan is a quarter located between Bebek and Rumelihisarı in the Beşiktaş district of Istanbul, Turkey. It is situated on the European side of the Bosphorus. Aşiyan Museum and Aşiyan Asri Cemetery are located in the quarter.

The neighborhood's name, meaning nest in Persian, derives from the poet Tevfik Fikret's house, now the Aşiyan Museum.The area is served by the F4 funicular line and several bus lines.

The Aşiyan Museum in 2022

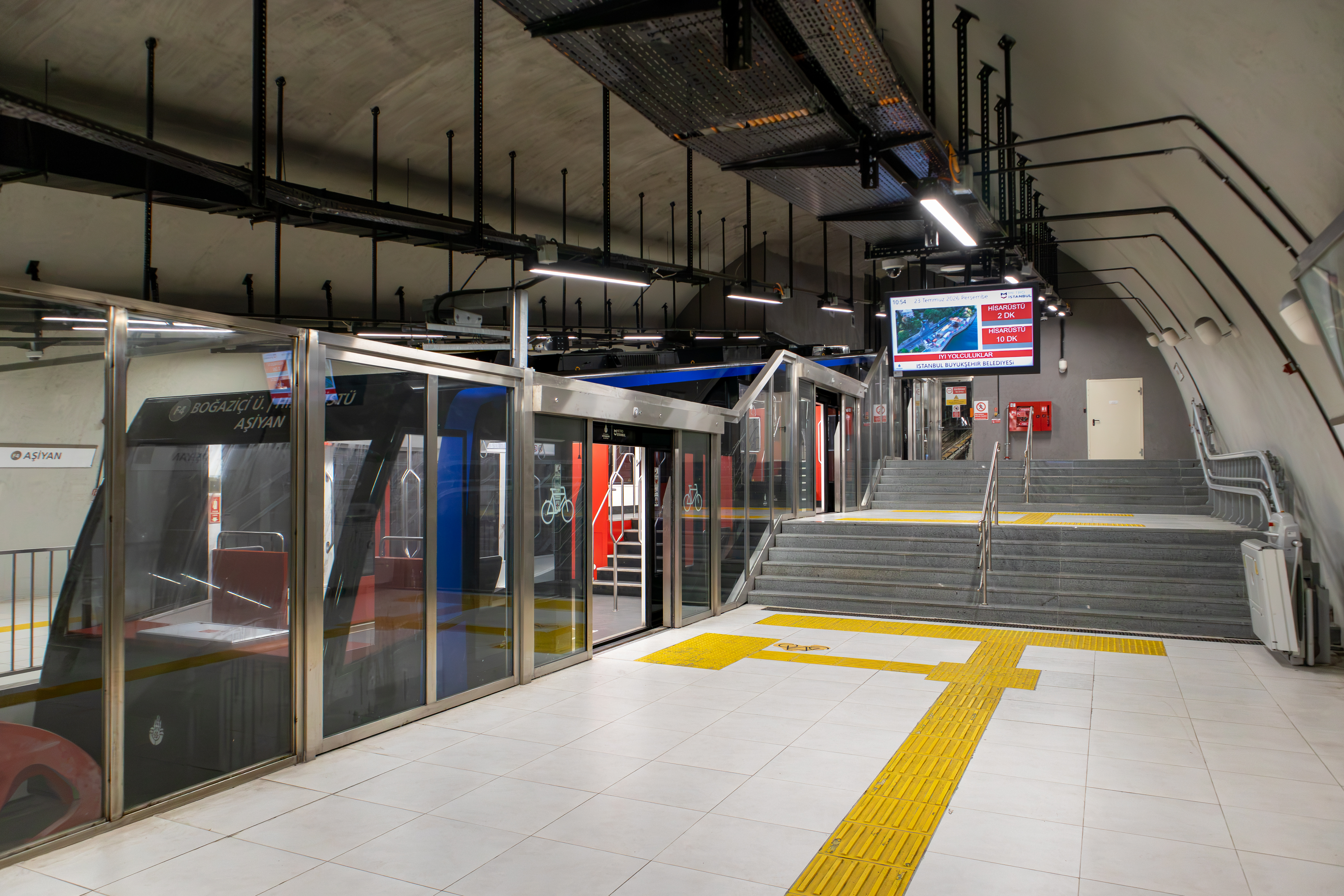
Aşiyan station
