= Behice =

Behice is a feminine given name which is used in Turkey. The word is of Arabic origin, meaning merry or beautiful, and it is the female version of the given names Behic and Behiç. Notable people with the name are as follows:

== People ==
- Behice Boran (1910–1987), Turkish politician
- Behice Hanım (1882–1969), consort of the Ottoman Sultan Abdulhamit
- Behice Sultan (1848–1876), Ottoman princess

== Fictional characters ==
- Behice, one of the main characters in the 2013 Turkish movie Gallipoli: End of the Road
