= Burhan Felek =

Turkish journalist (1889–1982)

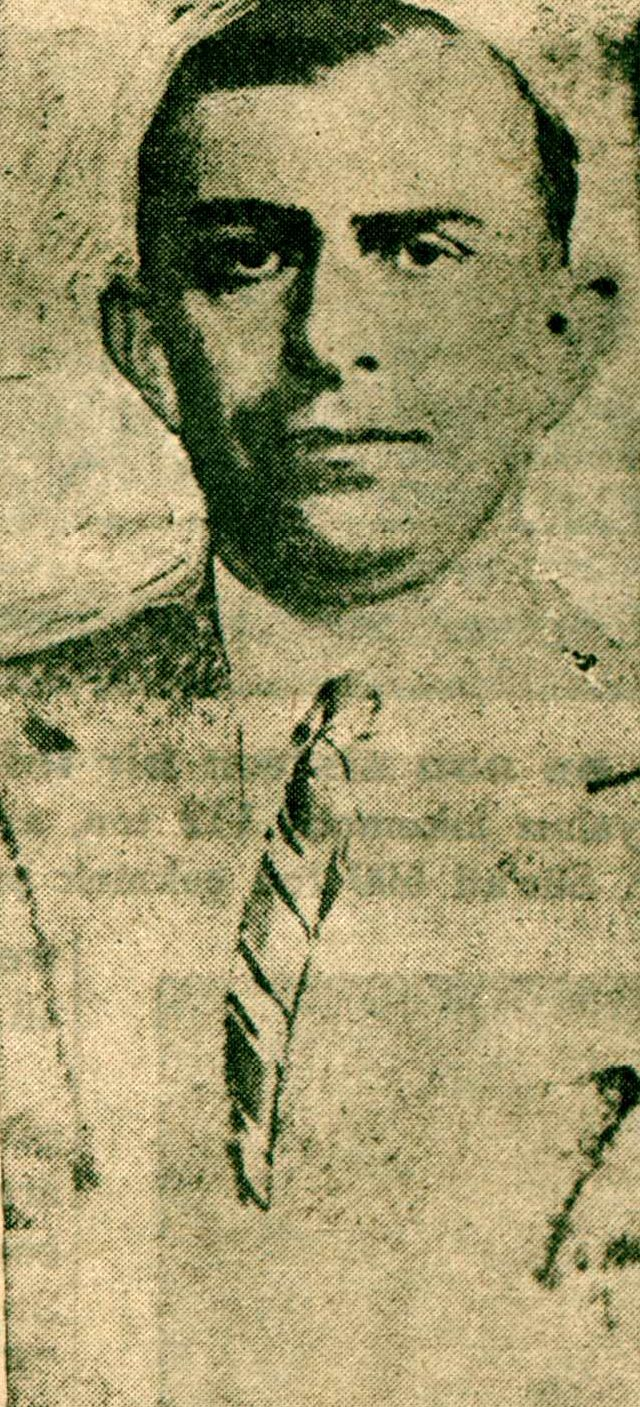
- Burhan Felek in 1930
- Born: May 11, 1889; Istanbul, Ottoman Empire
- Died: November 4, 1982 (aged 93); Istanbul, Turkey
- Education: Law
- Occupations: Journalist, columnist
- Years active: 1924–1982

Burhan Felek (May 11, 1889, in Istanbul – November 4, 1982, in Istanbul) was a Turkish journalist, columnist, sportsperson and writer.

== Biography ==
He was born on May 11, 1889, in Istanbul. After graduating in 1910 from Istanbul Law School, later the Faculty of Law at Istanbul University, he worked as a legal consultant at the Ministry of Commerce, a high school teacher, and an independent lawyer.

Burhan Felek died on November 4, 1982, at the age of 93 in Istanbul. He was buried in the Karacaahmet Cemetery.

== Sportsperson ==
During his youth years, Burhan Felek practiced sports including wrestling, athletics and football. He took part in 1500 metres middle distance running events and played football. In 1907, he co-founded the Üsküdar Anadolu Sports Club.

After retiring from active sports, he continued to involve in national and international sports activities. SHe served as a football referee, and was among the founders of the Balkan Games and Mediterranean Games. He served from 1938 to 1952 as the secretary general of the Turkish Olympic Committee, and between 1960 and 1964 and then between 1965 and 1982 as its president.

In 1922 he founded, with Ali Sami Yen and Yusuf Ziya Öniş, Turkish Athletic Federation (Türkiye İdman Cemiyetleri İttifakı). He served until 1936 as the president of the federation.

== Journalist ==
Burhan Felek's journalism career started in 1909 as an amateur by writing in the periodical "İdman" (Athletics). His professional career began the next year when he wrote for the periodical Donanma (The Navy). He worked in 1918 as a sports editor and photo reporter at the daily Tasvîr-i Efkâr. After writing a column and humorous stories at various publications such as Tan, Vakit, Vatan, Yeni Ses, Alemdar, Dün ve Bugün and Tetebbu, he continued to write at Cumhuriyet 29-years long. On September 1, 1969, Burhan Felek transferred to Milliyet, where he wrote until his death in 1982. He wrote a humor column, "Recebin Kahvesi" (Recep's Café), published on Sundays.

Felek served for 26 years as the president of the "Association of Journalists in Istanbul" (İstanbul Gazeteciler Cemiyeti), the forerunner of the Association of Turkish Journalists (TGC).

His last column was published in Millyet on November 5, 1982, the day following his death.

== Recognition ==
For his contribution to the Olympic Movement, he received the certificate "Diplome de Merite Olimpic" from the International Olympic Committee.

In 1974 Burhan Felek was awarded with the honorific title "Şeyh-ül Muharririn" (Leader of the journalists).

The "Association of Turkish Journalists" (TGC) awards every year "Burhan Felek Prize" to honor journalists for their distinguished service.

On May 8, 1980, he received an honorary Doctor degree from Istanbul University.

The French government awarded him posthumously with the Legion of Honour.

A sports complex comprising indoor arenas and swimming pools, situated in Altunizade neighborhood of Üsküdar district in Istanbul, is named Burhan Felek Sports Complex. A street In Eskişehir and Mersin is named after him.

== Bibliography ==
- Hint Masalları (travel notes,1944)
- Felek (1947)
- Vatandaş Efendi (humorous story, 1957)
- Eski İstanbul Hikâyeleri (1971)
- Yaşadığımız Günler (1974)
- Nasrettin Hoca (1982)
