= Cenâb Şehâbeddîn =

Turkish writer (1870–1934)

Cenap Şahabettin
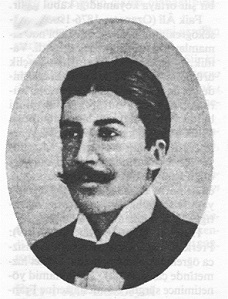
- Born: March 21, 1870; Bitola, Ottoman Empire
- Died: February 12, 1934 (aged 63); Istanbul, Turkey
- Education: Military medicine
- Occupations: Poet, writer, physician

Cenâb Şehâbeddîn (born 21 March 1870, Bitola – 12 February 1934, Istanbul), was a Turkish poet and writer. He was one of the leading representatives of Servet-i Fünûn literature.

== Biography ==
He was born on March 21, 1870, in Bitola. His father, Osman Şehabeddin Bey, was a major in the Ottoman Army and he died during the Siege of Plevna during the Russo-Turkish War (1877–1878). After the death of his father, he moved to Istanbul with his family when he was about six years old.

=== Education ===
He attended primary school at Mekteb-i Feyziyye in Tophane. Then he entered Eyüp Military High School. After the collapse of this school, he transferred to Gülhane Military Medical Academy and graduated from here in 1880. Then he entered Medical Academy, after studying for two years, he was accepted to the fifth year of Military Medical Academy. He graduated from school as a doctor captain in 1889. As he graduated with a good degree, he was sent to Paris by the state at the beginning of 1890 to specialize in the field of skin diseases. He stayed here for about four years.

=== Career ===
Cenap Şahabeddin is one of the main figures who has been accepted as an authority in various fields of literature, especially poetry, in his writing activities starting from 1895 and continuing until his death. He is among those who made the biggest innovations after Abdülhak Hâmid in Turkish poetry, which developed under the influence of Western literature after the Tanzimat.

Cenap Şahabeddin, who was born and raised in a family closely interested in literature, was under the influence of Muallim Naci and Şeyh Vasfi when he was fifteen or sixteen, and prepared and compiled their ghazals. His first poem was a ghazal and was published in the newspaper Saadet in 1885, while he was still a student. Later, the verse form of nineteen poems he wrote became ghazal.

After this period, the new poems of Cenap Şahabeddin, who started to read the works of masters such as Abdülhak Hâmid Tarhan and Recâizâde Mahmud Ekrem, were published in the journals Gülşen, Sebat and İmdâdü'l-midâd, together with the newspaper Saadet. While he was still a medical student, he published 18 of his poems in a small book called "Tâmât" in 1886.

=== Death ===
During his tenure at Istanbul University, students protested, claiming that he praised the Greeks and made derogatory remarks about the Turkish war of independence during a lecture. These demonstrations continued until Cenâb and some of his colleagues resigned in 1922. Although Cenâb denied making the alleged statements, it did not help, and he was forced to resign. He did not take any official position and partially withdrew from social life after his resignation, dedicating himself to writing. On February 13, 1934, he died of a heart attack. His grave is in Bakırköy Cemetery.

== Bibliography ==
=== Poem ===
- Tâmât (1887)
- Seçme Şiirleri (1934, ölümünden sonra)
- Bütün Şiirleri (1984, ölümünden sonra)
- "Elhan-ı Şita"
- "Yakazat-ı Leyliye"

=== Theatre ===
- Yalan
- Körebe (1917)
- Küçükbeyler
- Merdud Aile

=== Study ===
- William Shakespeare (1932)
- Kadı Burhanettin

=== Travel article ===
- Hac Yolunda (1909)
- Afak-ı Irak (1917)
- Avrupa Mektupları (1919)
- Suriye Mektupları (1917)
- "Medine'ye Varamadım (1933)

=== Articles ===
- Evrak-ı Eyyam (1915)
- Nesr-i Harp (1918)
- Nesr-i Sulh (1918)
