= Servet (newspaper) =

Servet was a newspaper published in the Ottoman Empire. It was initially published by Demetrius Nicolaides, an Ottoman Greek. It was initially only in Ottoman Turkish, though it later also had content in French. It was mailed to people in Constantinople (now Istanbul) and people in Anatolia, with twice weekly distribution to the latter.

Servet-i Fünûn was originally a supplement of Servet.

== History ==
Initially he wished to publish a newspaper, Asya, in Karamanli Turkish, or Turkish in the Greek alphabet. He applied to the Ottoman Press Office for permission to publish the newspaper around November 1887, with permission granted in December of that year. He had to publish from Babıali as he could not produce the paper from Galata during the day, and Ottoman authorities did not permit the production of newspapers in Galata at night. In 1888 the Ottoman authorities informed Nicolaides that he could not use the name Asya and that he needed to use Perso-Arabic characters, instead of Greek characters. Nicolaides was still interested in publication in Ottoman Turkish with any newspaper name, so Servet ultimately became the publication's name. The Ministry of the Interior received Nicolaides' request for publishing the paper in January 1888, and around February of that year the newspaper began distribution. Evangelina Baltia and Ayșe Kavak, authors of "Publisher of the newspaper Konstantinoupolis for half a century," wrote that they could find no information explaining why Nicolaides' proposal for a Karamanli newspaper was turned down; at the time other publications in the empire in Karamanli Turkish existed. They also could not find any evidence explaining why Nicolaides accepted having an Ottoman Turkish publication.

During the tenure of Nicolaides as owner, The newspaper revealed a criminal scheme to create fake currency, and it reported on the termination of Minister of Finance Mahmud Celaleddin Pasha (1839-1899); Balta and Kavak wrote that the newspaper had a "militant" point of view on the latter. In addition the newspaper had received official rebukes for stating negative information about Sultan of the Ottoman Empire Abdulhamid II and for also doing so against a high school teacher, Şerif Efendi, who was later cleared by an investigation in the Ministry of Education; the publication had to retract articles about the latter. It began receiving a monthly 1,000 piastre benefit after applying for it in 1891.

After translator Ahmed İhsan suggested having a supplement each week, Servet began running Servet-i Fünûn from 1891 to 1892 with Abdulhamid II's approval after Nicolaides, in late 1890, applied to create a supplement about industry and science. Nicolaides decided to sell the supplement to İhsan as he believed not enough copies were being purchased. The supplement became its own publication which ran until 1944.

In 1895 Servet began publishing content in French also after Abdulhamid II's affirmation; Nicolaides had applied to the Interior Ministry for this in August 1895.

Tahir Bey became the publisher in 1897, and the owner in 1898, the latter with approval from Abdulhamid II, after Nicolaides agreed to transfer it to him for 50 years. Tahir got permission to include pictures, and he also split the Ottoman Turkish and French portions into separate editions.

== Contents ==
The publication not only covered general empire news but also news about the Rum Millet and its institutions, as well as the Ecumenical Patriarchate of Constantinople. Baltia and Kavak argued that based on a statement by Ali Arslan comparing the editorship to the office of the patriarch and the Tower of Babel that the newspaper's content "was disorganized." Ahmed İhsan translated much of the content into Turkish.

== See also ==
- Konstantinoupolis - A newspaper in Greek published by Nicolaides
- Législation ottomane - A collection of Ottoman laws in French edited by Nicolaides
- Media in the Ottoman Empire
- Anatoli - A newspaper in Karamanli Turkish
