= Mehmet Tahir =

Ottoman publisher (1864–1912)

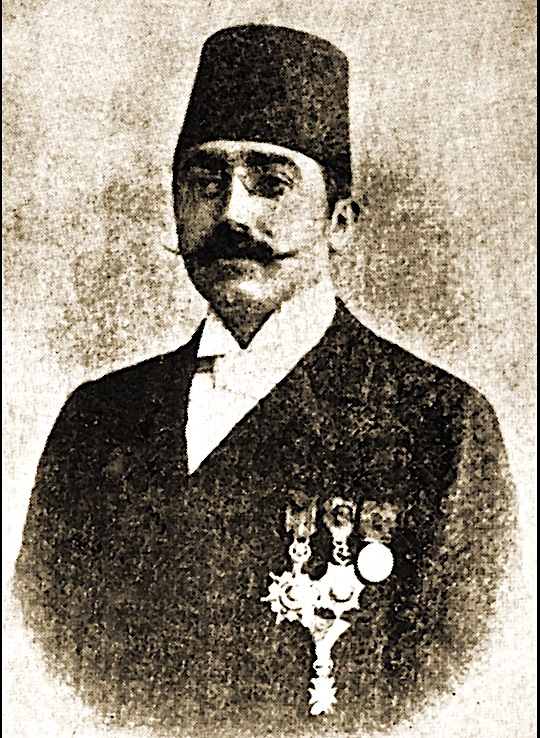
- Tahir in Malamut, 1897
- Born: 1864
- Died: 1912 (aged 47–48); Istanbul, Turkey
- Occupation: Publisher
- Known for: Publisher of Hanımlara Mahsus Gazete
- Spouse: Fatma Şadiye Hanım

Mehmet Tahir (1864–1912), also known as Ibn Hakkı Mehmet Tahir, Baba Tahir, and Malumatçı Tahir, was an Ottoman publisher. He was a significant figure in Ottoman journalism. He published numerous periodicals and newspapers, including Malumat and Hanımlara Mahsus Gazete. He is also known for his criminal offenses.

== Biography ==
Tahir was born in 1864. He owned a publishing house in Istanbul, where he published many periodicals and newspapers.

Tahir had close connections with Sultan Abdulhamit. In 1898, he was awarded a medal by the sultan and given a higher imperial rank, rütbe. He was also appointed clerk at the palace.

Tahir published newspapers in Egypt which featured articles opposing the Ottomans. These publications were, in fact, fabricated by him to blame the Young Turks and to create further tensions between Sultan Abdulhamit and the group. In 1900, another conflict occurred because of the news published in his papers Malumat and Servet. The papers accused the Dutch colonial rule of being hostile to Muslims living in the Dutch East Indies, including Java. Upon this news, the Dutch ambassador Wilhelm Ferdinand Heinrich von Weckherlin sent a note to the sultan demanding the cancellation of these publications. The request of the Dutch was followed for a while, but the news continued from 1901.

Tahir's other improper journalistic activities included the publication of his newspapers without paying the tax stamps and the licences. He was also involved in the illegal patent business, and sold them to Europeans. Although he was not punished for these illegal operations for a while, in 1907 he was arrested and sent to exile in Tripoli. The next year, he returned to Istanbul following the constitutional revolution.

Tahir was married to Fatma Şadiye Hanım, who was a contributor to Hanımlara Mahsus Gazete.

He died in Paris, in 1912, aged 48 or 49.
