= Ahmet Emin Yalman =

Turkish journalist, author and professor (1888–1972)

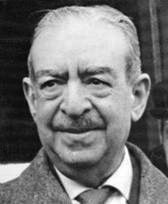
- Born: 14 May 1888; Selanik, Ottoman Empire
- Died: 19 December 1972 (aged 84); Istanbul, Turkey
- Resting place: Feriköy Cemetery, Istanbul
- Education: Deutsche Schule Istanbul
- Alma mater: Istanbul University; Columbia University
- Occupations: Journalist; writer; academic
- Awards: Golden Pen of Freedom (1961)

Ahmet Emin Yalman (14 May 1888 – 19 December 1972) was a Turkish journalist, publisher, professor and influential policy-advisor in the Republic of Turkey. He was a liberal and opposed the spread of the Nazi ideology in his home country.

== Early life and education ==
Ahmet Emin Yalman was born in 1888 in Selanik (Thessaloniki), at that time part of the Ottoman Empire. His early education was diverse and he attended several schools in Thessaloniki, amongst them a primary school with Sabbatean influences, then the military middle school where his father Osman Tevfik Bey was the teacher of calligraphy and history. Following some difficulties Yalman ran into with his teachers, his father decided to enroll him into the German school in Selanik. In 1903, as his father was employed in the Ottoman Press directorate in Constantinople (present-day Istanbul), he attended the Deutsche Schule Istanbul in Beyoğlu where he learned German and English. Following his graduation, Yalman began to work as a translator for the newspaper Sabah as well as the Ottoman Government. He also attempted to study law at the Darülfünun in Istanbul, but was not able to finish his schooling there. He joined the Committee of Union and Progress, as well as the Freemasonry lodge Obedience of Véritas. From 1911 onward, Yalman studied political science at Columbia University, from where he earned a Ph.D in 1914.

== Professional career ==
After Yalman returned to Istanbul, he worked with Ziya Gökalp at the Darülfünun and was a journalist for the newspaper Tanin. For Tanin, he covered World War I from the various battle fronts in which the German Empire was involved. Following his return to Istanbul, he established the newspaper Vakit in October 1917.

In 1919, due to his opposition to the government of Damat Ferid Pasha, Yalman was exiled for three months to Kutahya by the order of the Sultan Mehmed VI. In 1920, he was exiled again, this time by the British Occupation forces for his support of the CUP.

Yalman was released in 1921 and joined the forces of the Ankara government around Mustafa Kemal Atatürk. Atatürk sent him to cover the several battle fronts in the Turkish War of Independence. In 1923, he founded the newspaper Vatan. Following this he became a fierce critic of the Kemalist government, especially of Prime Minister İsmet İnönü who demanded the imposition of the law for the restoration of order during the Sheikh Said rebellion. Due to this opposition, Yalman had to stand trial before the Independence Tribunals and was banned from journalistic activities until 1936. During this period, he became involved in business and served as a representative of various American companies. When he was allowed to resume his journalistic activities he worked for the Tan newspaper.

In 1940, Yalman was able to reestablish the Vatan. In 1952, a nationalist student attempted to murder him but the assault failed and the student was sentenced to twenty years in prison. At the end of the Menderes era, he was imprisoned and condemned to over one-year imprisonment, but was released after the military coup of 1960. He died on 19 December 1972 in Istanbul.

== Work and awards ==
Yalman was the founder, and for many years the editor, of the influential Turkish nationalist newspaper Vatan. He was also one of the founders of the Liberal International in 1947 and the International Press Institute in 1950.

He published three books in English, one in German, and more than ten in Turkish, including a four volume autobiography. Titles include The Development of Modern Turkey as Measured by Its Press (1914), An Experiment in Clean Journalism (1950), Turkey In My Time (1956), and Turkey in the World War (1930).

Yalman received numerous awards, including the Golden Pen of Freedom of the International Federation of Newspaper Publishers in 1961 and The Gold Medal of the British Institute of Journalists.
