= Hanımlara Mahsus Gazete =

Women's magazine in Ottoman Empire (1895–1908)

- Categories: Women's magazine
- Frequency: Biweekly; Weekly
- Publisher: Mehmet Tahir
- Founded: 1895
- First issue: 31 August 1895
- Final issue Number: 13 August 1908; 624
- Country: Ottoman Empire
- Based in: Istanbul
- Language: Ottoman Turkish

Hanımlara Mahsus Gazete (Ottoman Turkish: Newspaper for Ladies) was an Ottoman women's magazine which was published in Istanbul from 1895 to 1908. It was one of the long-term publications in the Ottoman Empire which shaped the literary traditions of the Ottoman women. However, due to the intensive censorship during the reign of Sultan Abdulhamit the magazine mostly featured conventional topics.

== History and profile ==
Hanımlara Mahsus Gazete was first published on 19 August 1895. At the initial phase it appeared biweekly, and from the fifty-second issue it became a weekly publication. The license holder and editor of the magazine was Ibn Hakkı Mehmet Tahir who also owned a newspaper, Tarık. Hanımlara Mahsus Gazete was the sole Ottoman women's magazine which had an editorial board, including Makbule Leman, Nigar Osman Hanım, Fatma Şadiye, Mustafa Asım, Faik Ali, Talat Ali and Gülistan İsmet. Later the administration of the magazine was assumed by Fatma Şadiye, wife of Mehmet Tahir.

The magazine was a supporter of Sultan Abdulhamit. Its target audience was Muslim women from the upper classes. The magazine covered a range of topics, including education, family, household management, child-rearing, hygiene, health, beauty, embroidery, leisure and fashion. It supported western lifestyle and advised the use of piano in girls’education. It also featured articles about the women's rights. In addition, the magazine serialized literary work by various women writers, including Emine Semiye, Fatma Fahrünissa, Fatma Aliye and Halide Edip. Major contributors were the sisters, Fatma Aliye and Emine Semiye. Of them Fatma Aliye published an editorial column in the magazine from its start in 1895 to its closure in 1908. The common goal of all contributors was to redefine the role of the Muslim Ottoman women in the changing socio-political environment of the Ottoman Empire.

Hanımlara Mahsus Gazete produced several supplements such as Hanım Kızlara Mahsus targeting female youth and Hanımlara Mahsus Kütüphane, a literary supplement. There was also an almanac entitled Nevsal-i Nisvan (Ottoman Turkish: Women’s Yearly) which was published by Avanzade Mehmed Süleyman from 1897 as a supplement to Hanımlara Mahsus Gazete.

Hanımlara Mahsus Gazete contributed to the charity organizations designed to assist women through the donations from its sales. It also supported the sales of the books written by women writers who also worked for the magazine, including Makes-i Hayal (1886; Ottoman Turkish: Reflection of the Imagination) by Makbule Leman and Levayih-i Hayat (1897; Ottoman Turkish: Scenes of From the Life) and Tedkik-i Ecsam (1899; Ottoman Turkish: Investigation of the Matters) by Fatma Aliye.

Hanımlara Mahsus Gazete ended publication with the last issue dated 13 August 1908 and produced 624 issues during its lifetime.
