= Ahmet İhsan Tokgöz =

Turkish politician

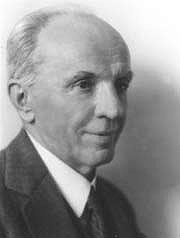

Member of the Grand National Assembly

Personal details
- Born: 1868 Erzurum, Ottoman Empire
- Died: 1942 (aged 73–74)

Ahmet İhsan Tokgöz (1868–1942) was a Turkish bureaucrat, politician, writer and sports official.

In the pre-1930s era he had the Ottoman title "bey".

== Biography ==
He was born in Erzurum to a civil servant family who originally came from Kastamonu. He completed his primary and secondary education in Shkodra and Damascus. In 1887, he graduated from the Faculty of Law. He became interested in literature during his school years and translated translations from French, especially Jules Verne.

The year he finished the estate, he published a fifteen-day magazine, Umran. He worked as a translator at the Translation Office of the Ministry of Foreign Affairs. At the same time, he started to work in Servet newspaper in 1888. In 1890, he left the Tophane Müşirliği and became a partner in the 'Realm Printing House 18. On March 27, 1891, he began to publish the weekly Servet-i Fünun magazine. In 1907, the company was renamed as Ahmet İhsan Matbaası by the separation of its partners.

In 1907 he joined the Committee of Union and Progress. After the Second Constitutional Era, Servet-i Fünun was transformed into a daily political newspaper. In 1909 Servet-i Fünun began to be published again weekly. In the same year, he continued to teach the economic geography courses he started in the Trade School until 1915. In 1912, he served as the mayor of Beyoğlu for fourteen months. In 1917, he began to publish Le Soir in French. In 1924 he re-established Servet-i Fünun which he had interrupted during the armistice. In 1931, he was elected as a member of the parliament, in the meanwhile he continued to publish his journal until his death.
