= Hüseyin Cahit Yalçın =

Turkish journalist and politician (1874–1957)

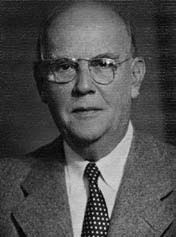

Member of the Grand National Assembly

Personal details
- Born: 7 December 1874 Balıkesir, Ottoman Empire
- Died: 18 October 1957 (aged 82) Istanbul, Turkey
- Party: Party of Union and Progress, Republican People's Party

Hüseyin Cahit Yalçın (7 December 1874 – 18 October 1957) was a prominent Turkish theorist, writer, and politician. He is famous for having been a dissident journalist, who was put on trial and punished due to his political newspaper columns. His publications defending the idea of a homogenous nation became popular within the Committee of Union and Progress. İsmail Habip Sevük described him as being the "most copious journalist in the whole world."

== Biography ==
Hüseyin Cahid was born in 1874 in Balıkesir. He was a graduate of Vefa High School, Istanbul.

He started his literary life by writing stories, novels and prose poems. He later wrote on journalism, criticism and translation. He also wrote satirical poems under the pseudonym Hemrah. He is one of the most important figures of the Edebiyat-ı Cedide (New Literary Movement). After the Second Constitutional Era, he helped Tevfik Fikret and Hüseyin Kâzım to publish the Tanin newspaper, as it was put into political life. He started his political career and joined the Committee of Union and Progress. He became a spokesman for the CUP while still undergoing his journalistic activities. He was elected to Ottoman Parliament in 1908 and served until 1912. Between 1908 and 1911, he wrote for Tanin, in which he opposed a German influence on the Ottoman Empire.

He escaped to Romania during the 31 March Incident since the rebels had hoped to kill him, but they confused Mehmet Aslan Bey for him and murdered him instead. After the suppression of the uprising, he returned to Istanbul.

In 1911, he started working at Ottoman Public Debt Administration. However, he had to leave Istanbul again in 1912 and moved to Vienna as his journal Tanin was banned after the 1912 coup d'état for opposing the Savior Offiers. He returned to Istanbul only after the 1913 coup d'état. Even though he had opposed German influence in the past, he joined the German-Turkish Association which would support the cultural and economic exchange between the two empires in 1915.

After the defeat of the Ottoman Empire in the First World War, Hüseyin Cahit was exiled to Malta by the British authorities and kept there until 1922. Right after his return, he started a newspaper called Renin but after a while renamed it as Tanin. He supported Mustafa Kemal (Atatürk) and the Turkish War of Independence in his articles. However, he soon opposed the Ankara Government due to the abolition of the sultanate and the caliphate.

During the One-Party Period Hüseyin Cahit kept his position as an opposition journalist and criticized many policies of the government, including the reforms such as the abolition of the caliphate and the Turkish language reform. Hüseyin Cahit promoted liberal democracy and attacked the government for imposing a tight control over society and culture. However, his criticisms were not taken seriously due to his previous membership in the CUP, the two regimes held similar ideologies. He was put on trial by the Independence Tribunal three times, he was acquitted twice, but in 1925 he was exiled to Çorum. In 1926, he received amnesty and returned to Istanbul.

After Atatürk's death in 1938, Hüseyin Cahit was invited to join the Republican People's Party by İsmet İnönü, and he was elected to the Parliament of Turkey. He started publishing Tanin newspaper again in 1943. He wrote articles against communism. In his article dated 3 December 1945, he attacked the Tan newspaper and Sabiha Sertel for supporting communism and the USSR. This article played an important role in provoking people and the headquarters of Tan was assaulted the next day.

In 1954, he was jailed again for his articles against the Democrat Party. He was sentenced to 26 months in jail. Due to an outcry from the public and the press, he was released after 14 weeks on the legal grounds of old age. Specifically, he was pardoned by the President of the Republic Celâl Bayar. He was 79 years old at the time of release.

He ran as a candidate in the 1957 parliamentary election, but he died on 18 October 1957 before the results were released. He was buried in the Feriköy Cemetery in Istanbul.

Hüseyin Cahit Yalçın is one of the most important polemicists of modern Turkish literature. He collected his discussions with writers such as Ahmet Rasim and Ali Kemal in the book "My Fights" and published it in 1910. Yalçın's place in Turkish polemic literature was examined in a book by Nurettin Öztürk in 2005.

=== Career ===
The scholar Syed Tanvir Wasti listed the following on Hüseyin Cahit Yalçın's works:

Hüseyin Cahit’s major works may be listed as follows with their dates of first publication in parentheses: two novels, Nâdîde (Unique or Matchless or Unseen before) (1891) and Hayâl İçinde

(In a Dream or Vision) (1901);34 collections of short stories, titled Hayât-ı Muhayyel (A Life Imagined) (1899), Hayât-ı Hakikiye Sahneleri (Scenes from Real Life) (1909) and Niçin Aldatırlarmış? (Why do they deceive/cheat?) (1922);35 Kavgalarım (My Arguments/Polemics/Quarrels) (1910); Edebî Hâtıralar (Literary Memories) (1935), edited by Rauf Mutluay and re-published under the title Edebiyat Anıları (Literary Memoirs) (1975);36 Siyasal Anılar (Political Memoirs) published in instalments,

edited by Rauf Mutluay and re-published under the same title (1976);37 Tanıdıklarım (My Acquaintances) (2001), published initially in instalments in the Yedigün (Seven Days) weekly magazine in 1936.

== Support for the Armenian Genocide ==
After the 1908 Young Turk Revolution, which advocated for liberal reforms such as legal equality among Ottoman peoples, Cahit published articles in Ottoman newspapers in which he described Turks as the millet-i hâkime (the "ruling nation"). He argued that if Muslims wanted to preserve their way of life they should retain political authority rather than permit non-Muslims to acquire it.

In 1936, Cahit wrote an article arguing that Bahaeddin Şakir (who is generally considered to be the main architect of the Armenian genocide) should be honored for his role in the Armenian genocide.
