= Enis Behiç Koryürek =

Turkish writer (1891–1949)

- Born: 11 March 1891; Istanbul, Ottoman Empire
- Died: 18 October 1949 (aged 58); Ankara, Turkey
- Occupation: Writer,
- Writing career
- Language: Turkish

Enis Behiç Koryürek (11 March 1891–18 October 1949) was a Turkish poet, teacher, diplomat and bureaucrat.

He contributed to the repair efforts of the Gül Baba Tomb during his tenure as a consular official in Hungary. He continued his career in the state department.

== Biography ==
He was born in 1891 in the Aksaray district of Istanbul. His father is Doctor Lieutenant Colonel İsmail Behiç Bey and his mother is Fâika Hanım.

After completing his primary education at home, he studied at Thessaloniki and Skopje High Schools and Istanbul High School and graduated from the Mülkiye Mektebi with first place in 1913. He published his first poem, titled "My Soul Embeds in My Poems" when he was 19 years old. He took part in the Fecr-i Ati community for a short time. He had wide repercussions with his poem "Vatan Elegy", which he dedicated to "Namik Kemal's soul".

== Bibliography ==
Poems

- Miras (1927)
- Varidat-ı Süleyman (Çedikçi Süleyman Çelebi Ruhundan İlhamlar, 1949)
- Güneşin Ölümü (1952)
