= Niyazi Berkes =

Turkish Cypriot academic and sociologist (1908–1988)

- Born: 21 October 1908; Nicosia, Cyprus
- Died: 18 December 1988 (aged 80); Hythe, England
- Education: Istanbul High School; Istanbul University
- Spouse: Mediha Berkes
- Scientific career
- Fields: Sociology
- Workplaces: Halkevleri (Ankara); TED Ankara College Foundation Schools; Istanbul University; University of Chicago; Ankara University DTCF; McGill University

Niyazi Berkes (21 October 1908 – 18 December 1988) was a Turkish Cypriot sociologist.

== Early life and education ==
Berkes was born in Nicosia, the capital of Cyprus, on 21 September 1908, shortly after the Young Turk Revolution in Turkey. He had a twin brother, Enver. They were named after Enver Pasha and Resneli Niyazi who were two leading figures of the revolution.

Niyazi started his secondary education in Nicosia. During his education, he later, went to Istanbul and graduated from Istanbul Erkek Lisesi (Istanbul Lycée, or Istanbul Boys' High School) in 1928. He began his university years studying law, but transferred to philosophy in hopes of broader intellectual engagements. In 1931, Berkes graduated from the department of philosophy, Istanbul University.

== Career ==
Following the graduation Berkes struggled to find a professorship immediately after graduating as he lacked patronage in universities and the Ministry of Education. Recommended by a friend, he applied to a position at the People's House in Ankara. There he was exposed to the ideology of Kemalism, which at the time, allowed for much intellectual debate regarding the construction of a new Turkey.

In 1935, he then became an assistant at the same faculty. In the same year, he had gone to United States and he had studied sociology at the University of Chicago until 1939. In 1939 he returned to Turkey and as an associate professor of sociology he attended to the faculty of languages, history and geography of Ankara University which had just opened a Philosophy Department. He had worked there until 1945. In 1952, he was appointed visiting professor at the Institute of Islamic Studies, the McGill University in Canada. In 1956, he became professor at the same university. He retired from McGill in 1975 and settled in England. Berkes wrote no more books after his retirement, but continued to write for the Turkish press. He died on 18 December 1988 in Hythe in England.

== Contributions ==
Berkes is a well-known Turkish sociologist, primarily known for his studies relating to the historical and social evolution of Turkey, such as the Development of Secularism in the Turkish Revolution, considered his magnum opus. In addition to his works reflecting his views and ideas on theoretical sociology, he researched the transition of Turkey from the Ottoman era.

== Works ==
- In 1943, he wrote his first essay on "the Development of Secularism in the Turkish Revolution" which has been seen as his magnum opus by outside Turkey.
- His first book was "Why have we been stumbling along the road to modernization for two hundred years?" written in 1964 and was followed by "Westernization, Nationalism and Social Revolution".
- In 1969, "Islamism, Nationalism, Socialism", "Islamism, Nationalism and Socialism in the Arab world", "Economic History of Turkey" (two volumes) were published.
- In 1973, "The Western Question in Turkish Thought" was published.
- In 1974, "Turkey's Coming of Age" was published.
- In 1976, "Asian Letters" was published.
- His articles and essays were collected and published in three volumes: Atatürk and Revolution in 1982, Theocracy and Secularism in 1984 and Philosophical and Social Essays in 1985.

== Bibliography ==
- Berkes Niyazi, Ahmad Feroz (1998). The Development of Secularism in Turkey. London: McGill University Press. ISBN 1-85065-344-5
- Berkes, Niyazi (2007). Türkiye’de Çağdaşlaşma. Istanbul: Yapı Kredi Publishing. ISBN 978-975-08-0434-1
