= Vatan (1923 newspaper) =

Turkish newspaper

- Type: Daily newspaper
- Format: Broadsheet
- Owner(s): Ahmet Emin Yalman; Nevzat Karaveli; Naim Tiralı; Numan Esin
- Founded: 1923
- Ceased publication: 1925, 1978
- Relaunched: 19 August 1940
- Political alignment: Democrat
- Language: Turkish

Vatan ("Fatherland") was a former Turkish newspaper founded by Ahmet Emin Yalman and his friends. There were two district periods in the history of Vatan.

== First term (1923–1925) ==
Ahmet Emin Yalman and Ahmet Şükrü Esmer founded the newspaper in Istanbul soon after Yalman returned from Malta exile (a mass exile to Malta by the British high commissioner following the First World War) in 1923. The newspaper supported Mustafa Kemal in his struggle to convert the monarchy to republic. But soon after the republic was proclaimed the newspaper began to oppose Mustafa Kemal and supported the main opposition Progressive Republican Party. After Sheikh Said rebellion the newspaper was closed down by the Independence Tribunals in 1925.

== Second term (1940–1978) ==
=== CHP government ===
The newspaper was relaunched on 19 August 1940 by Ahmet Emin Yalman. During the Second World War, Vatan frequently criticized the Republican People's Party (CHP) government. For example, Vatan sharply opposed the Wealth tax, a new tax directed at the wealthy citizens most of whom were non-Muslim in 1942, to raise funds to support the defense of the country. Vatan was punished for this opposition by the court. Its publication was suspended for six months. But after the war, Vatan was able to continue in a more democratic environment. In the 1945–46 term, it supported the Democrat Party (DP) against the CHP government.

=== DP government ===
This support continued after DP won the 1950 election. However, Vatan also began criticizing DP for the latter's non-secular moves. On 22 November 1952, Yalman barely escaped an assassination attempt in Malatya. Even after this incident, Vatan continued to support DP in such operations like closing the Nation Party and participating in the Korean War. However DP, once a champion of democracy was no longer democratic and by the 1957 elections, due to the disillusionment with the totalitarian rule of DP, Vatan ended its DP support. It became one of the notable opposition papers to the DP government.

DP government punished Vatan (like all other opposition papers) by various methods like reducing the advertising revenue and limiting the newsprint paper. Later courts also punished Vatan by temporarily suspending its publication. In 1959 Ahmet Emin Yalman, as well as the other Vatan people like Naim Tiralı and Selami Akpınar, were jailed only to be set free by the 1960 Turkish coup d'état.

=== Later years ===
During the troubled years, Vatan faced deep financial problems. About half of the shares were bought by a new group and in 1961 Yalman sold his shares to break away. After Yalman's term, the royalty of the newspaper was sold to Naim Tiralı the former executive editor of the paper. Meanwhile, the newspaper infrastructure (buildings and machinery) was sold to Hürriyet newspaper.

In 1976 Vatan was sold to Numan Esin who began publishing Vatan in Ankara as an afternoon paper up to 1978.

== Recent Vatan ==
The former newspaper Vatan which continued publishing between 2002 and 2018 is not related to the former Vatan except for its title.

== Sources ==
- Karaveli, Orhan (2001). Görgü Tanığı. Istanbul: Pergamon. ISBN 975-96826-2-1.
- Gök, Sanem. "Türk Siyasal yaşamında Vatan gazetesi" (PDF). Ankara University.
- Öymen, Altan (2009). Öfkeli Yıllar. Istanbul: Doğan Kitap. ISBN 978-605-111-401-9.
- Bali, Rifat N. (2008). A Scapegoat for All Seasons:the Dönmes or Crypto-jews of Turkey. Istanbul: Isis Press. ISBN 978-9754283631.
