= Servet-i Fünun =

Literary weekly magazine in Ottoman Empire (1891–1944)

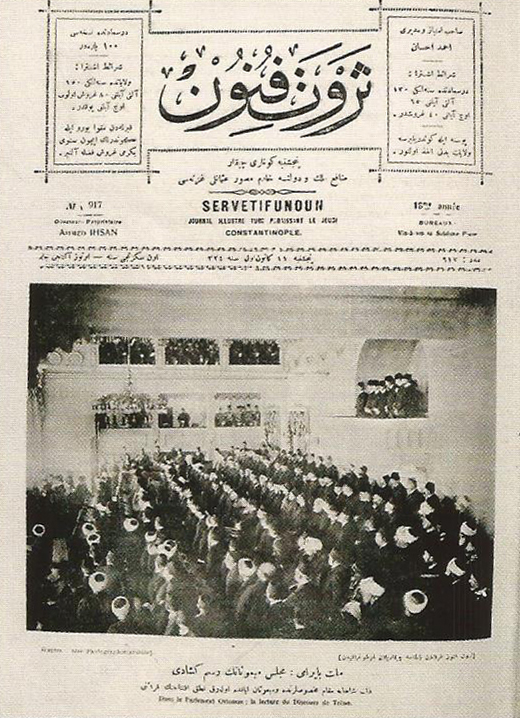
- Issue dated 24 December 1908
- Categories: Literary magazine
- Frequency: Weekly
- Country: Ottoman Empire
- Based in: Istanbul
- Language: Ottoman Turkish (earlier issues); Turkish (later issues); French for the French supplements)
- OCLC: 183347868

Servet-i Fünun (Ottoman Turkish: ثروت فنون, romanized: S̱ervet-i Funûn, lit. 'The Wealth of the Arts/Sciences (Note: "Fünūn" is the plural form of "fen(n)", which properly means "art" in the sense of "liberal arts"; therefore, "learned skill".)'; French: Servetifunoun) was an avant-garde journal published in the Ottoman Empire and later in Turkey. Halit Ziya (Uşaklıgil) and the other writers of the "New Literature" (Ottoman Turkish: Edebiyat-i Jedide) movement published it to inform their readers about European, particularly French, cultural and intellectual movements. In operation from 1891 until 1944, it was for its first year a supplement of the newspaper Servet, but became an independent publication from 1892.

Its offices were in Stamboul, the central part of Constantinople (now known in English as Istanbul). Today the region is known as the Fatih district.

Evangelia Balta and Ayșe Kavak state that during the late Ottoman Empire it was "[t]he most influential literary journal" which had "a significant role in the intellectual life" of the country. Other titles of the magazine were Uyanış, Resimli Uyaniş, and Terwet-i fünūn.

== History ==
In 1890 20-year old Ahmed İhsan, who later took the family name Tokgöz, translated articles into Turkish for Servet, an Ottoman Turkish newspaper owned and operated by Ottoman Greek Demetrius Nicolaides. Ahmed İhsan suggested having a supplement each week. Servet began running Servet-i Fünûn from 1891 to 1892 with the approval of Sultan of the Ottoman Empire Abdulhamid II after Nicolaides, in late 1890, applied to create a supplement about industry and science. Nicolaides decided to sell the supplement to İhsan as he believed not enough copies were being purchased. Balta and Kavak wrote that relatively little scholarship on Servet-i Fünun describes Nicolaides' initial role and that "The overwhelming majority of scholars ascribe the periodical to Ahmed İhsan".

Tevfik Fikret became its editor in 1896. Another prominent contributor was the poet Süleyman Nazif.

Major rival of Servet-i Fünun was Malumat, a weekly magazine published by Mehmet Tahir, a supporter of Sultan Abdulhamit.

== Contents ==
Halit Ziya's romance novel Aşk-ı Memnu was serialized in the journal in 1899 and 1900. The novel has since been adapted into several television series, the best known of which is the internationally popular 2008–10 series of the same name.

== Legacy ==
Multiple PhD theses and academic articles were dedicated to this publication.
