= Abdülhak Hâmid Tarhan =

Turkish playwright, poet and politician (1852–1937)

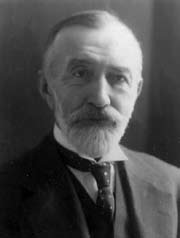
- Born: Abdülhak Hâmid; January 2, 1852; Constantinople, Ottoman Empire
- Died: April 12, 1937 (aged 85); Istanbul, Turkey
- Occupations: Playwright, poet
- Father: Hayrullah Efendi

Abdülhak Hâmid Tarhan (born Abdülhak Hâmid; January 2, 1852 – April 12, 1937) was an early 20th-century Ottoman playwright and poet. He was one of the leading lights of the Turkish Romantic period. He is known in Turkish literature as "Şair-i Azam" (The Grand Poet) and "Dahi-i Azam" (The Grand Genius).

== Early years ==
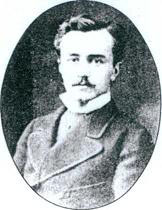
Abdülhak Hâmid Tarhan in his early days

Abdülhak Hâmid Tarhan was born Abdülhak Hâmid on January 2, 1852, in Bebek, Istanbul. His father was Hayrullah Efendi, a historian and ambassador. His mother, Münteha Hanım, was Circassian. He was the grandson of Abdulhak Molla, a poet and physician at the court of Sultan Abdul Hamid II. Abdulhak Hâmid took private lessons from Yanyalı Tahsin Hoca and Edremitli Bahaddin Hoca while attending secondary school. In August 1863 he went to Paris, France with his brother Nasuhi, where his father had been posted. He continued his education there for one and a half years. After he returned to Istanbul, he enrolled in a French education school and worked in a translation office to advance his French. One year later, he followed his father, who was appointed to the Ottoman Embassy in Tehran, Iran. He studied the Persian language for more than one year as well as Arabic and Persian poetry. Following his father's death in 1867, he returned to Istanbul and entered civil service. After his entrance he enrolled in school.

== Professional life ==
After he came in contact with prominent literary personalities, Abdulhak Hâmid wrote his first prose Macera-yı Aşk (Love Affair) depicting his memoirs in Tehran. In 1871, he married Fatma.

Entering the foreign affairs service, he was appointed in 1876 to the Ottoman Embassy in Paris, where he had the opportunity to learn about French literature.

In 1878, he had his first brush with controversy following the publishing of his play Nesteren in Paris. It depicted a rebellion against a tyrannical ruler, and the actual ruler of Turkey at that time, Sultan Abdul Hamid II was so upset by it that he had the playwright suspended from his government job.

Returning to the foreign affairs service, he was appointed in 1881 to Poti, Georgia, in 1882 to Volos, Greece and in 1883 to Bombay, India. Due to his wife's illness, the family left India in 1885. On their way to Istanbul, his wife Fatma died in Beirut (then part of the Ottoman Empire). She was buried there with the experience inspiring him to write his poem Makber (The Grave), which later became very popular.

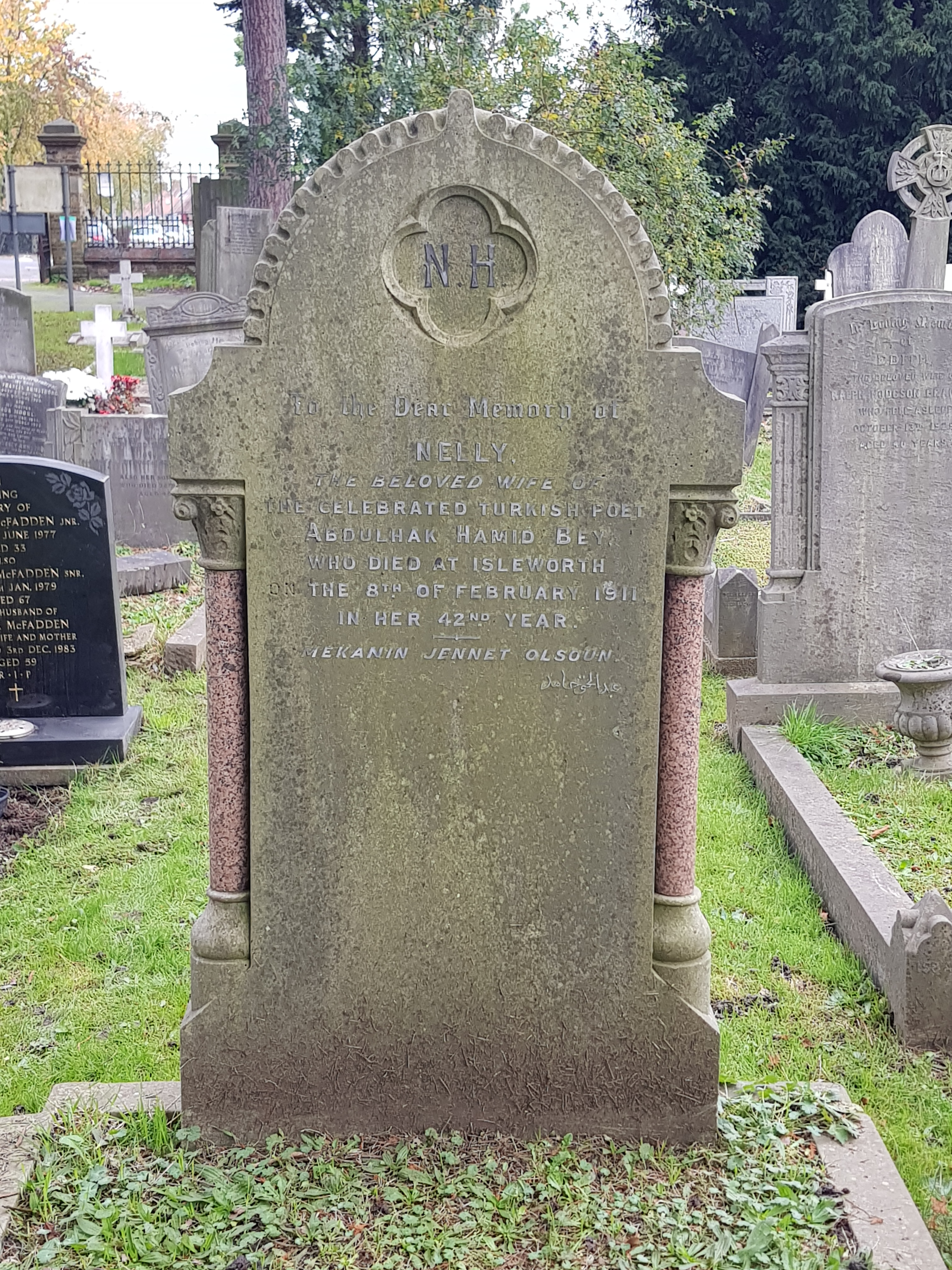
Grave of Nelly, Abdülhak Hâmid's second wife, in New Brentford Cemetery

Because of his work "Zeynep", he was suspended from his role at the Embassy in London and forced to return home. Only after his promise not to write any more, was he allowed to return to his post in London. While in London he married a British woman, Nelly. After two years of service in The Hague in the Netherlands, he was appointed back to London. Abdulhak Hâmid returned to Turkey in 1900 due to his wife's illness. In 1906, he was sent to the Embassy in Brussels, Belgium.

In 1908, he became a member of the Turkish Senate. His wife Nelly died in 1911. He later married a Belgian, Lucienne.

Abdulhak Hâmid had to return to Turkey after being deposed from his role by the cabinet during the Balkan Wars. He spent a short time in Vienna, Austria after World War I and returned home following the proclamation of the Turkish Republic in 1923. He continued in politics and was elected into the Grand National Assembly as deputy of Istanbul in 1928, a post he retained until his death.

Abdulhak Hâmid Tarhan died on April 12, 1937, and was laid to rest in the Zincirlikuyu Cemetery in Istanbul, following a state funeral.

== Works ==
He was influenced by Tanzimat and also Namık Kemal, and in general, by French literature. The loss of his first wife was a key point in his life as he wrote and dedicated many pieces involving her, such as Makber. He left behind a legacy of western influences on the evolving Turkish literature scene and is considered one of the greatest Turkish romantic writers.

=== Poetry ===
- Sahra (The Desert, 1879)
- Makber (The Grave, 1885)
- Ölü (The Corpse, 1885)
- Hacle (1886)
- Bunlar Odur (These are Her, 1885)
- Divaneliklerim Yahut Belde (My Madness or the Town, 1885)
- Bir Sefirenin Hasbihali (Chat With an Ambassadress, 1886)
- Bala'dan Bir Ses (A Voice from Bala, 1912)
- Validem (My Mother, 1913)
- İlham-ı Vatan (Inspiration of the Motherland, 1916)
- Tayflar Geçidi (The Parade of Spectrums, 1917)
- Ruhlar (The Spirits, 1922)
- Garam (My Passion, 1923).

=== Plays ===
- Macera-yı Aşk (Love Affair, prose, 1873; in verse, 1910)
- Sabr-u Sebat (Perseverance in Patience, 1875, staged at İstanbul City Theatres in 1961)
- İçli Kız (The Oversensitive Girl, 1875)
- Duhter-i Hindu (The Girl of India, 1876)
- Nazife (Nazife, 1876, together with Abdüllahü's-Sağir, 1917)
- Nesteren (Dog Rose, 1878)
- Tarık Yahut Endülüs'ün Fethi (Tarık Or The Conquest Of Spain, 1879, simplified by Sadi Irmak and Behçet Kemal Çağlar, staged at İstanbul City Theatres, 1962)
- Tezer Yahut Abdurrahman-ı Salis (Tezer or Abdurrahman III., 1880)
- Eşber (Eşber, 1880)
- Zeynep (Zeynep, 1908)
- İlhan (İlhan, 1913)
- Liberte (Freedom, 1913)
- Finten (Finten, 1887)
- İbn-i Musa Yahut Zadülcemal (İbn-i Musa or Zadülcemal, 1917)
- Sardanapal (Sardanapal, 1917)
- Abdüllahi's Sağir (Little Abdullah, 1917)
- Yadigar-ı Harb (The Souvenir of The War, 1917)
- Hakan (1935)
- Cünun-ı Aşk (Insanity Of Love, serial, not published, 1917)
- Kanuni'nin Vicdan Azabı (Remorse of Suleyman The Magnificent, 1937, not published).

İnci Enginün translated his plays into modern Turkish, which were published in seven volumes (1998–2002).

=== Other works ===
- Mektuplar (Letters, collected by Süleyman Nazif, two volumes, 1916)
- Hatırat (Memories, serials in the newspapers İkdam and Vakit, 1924–25)
- Yusuf Mardin is a novel about the years Abdulhak Hamit spent in London. He published it under the name of Abdulhak Hamit'in Londrası (Abdulhak Hamit's London)

== See also ==
- List of contemporary Turkish poets
