= Tanin (newspaper) =

Turkish newspaper (1908–1947)

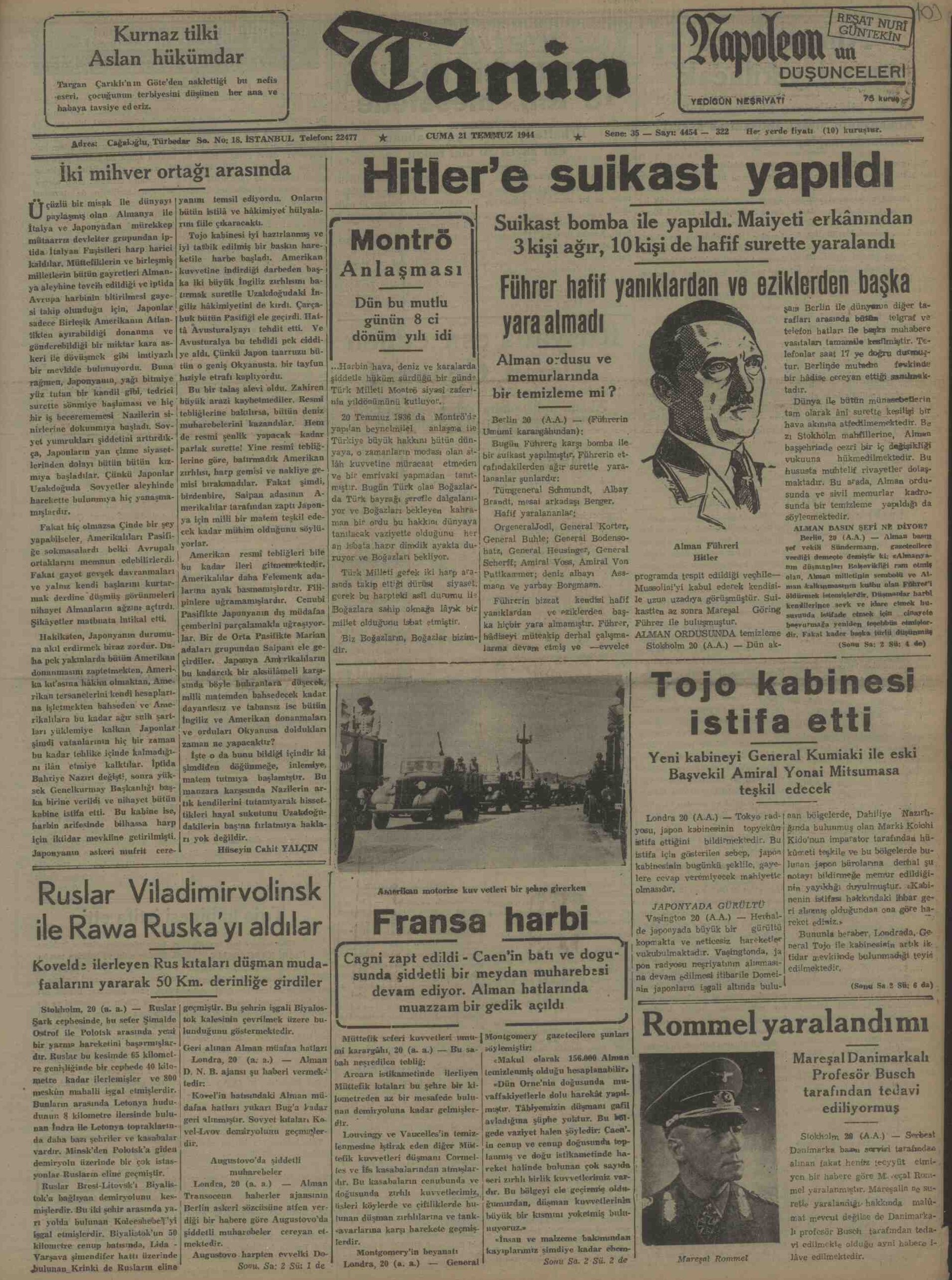
- Front page of the 21 July 1944 edition of Tanin
- Type: Newspaper
- Founder: Tevfik Fikret
- Founded: 1908
- Ceased publication: 1947
- Language: Turkish
- Headquarters: Istanbul

Tanin (Turkish: "resonance") was a Turkish newspaper. It was founded in 1908 after the Young Turk Revolution, by Tevfik Fikret, the Ottoman poet who is considered the founder of the modern school of Turkish poetry. It became a strong supporter of the new progressive ruling party, the Committee of Union and Progress (CUP; Turkish: İttihat ve Terakki Cemiyeti), and pluralism and diversity were reflected in the pages of Tanin.

The offices of Tanin and Şûrâ-yı Ümmet, another publication supportive of the Committee, were destroyed during the 31 March Incident that deposed Abdul Hamid II. During this time, the Tanin's editor, Hüseyin Cahid, escaped to Odessa.

It was published until 1947. Although Tevfik Fikret was initially supportive of the CUP democratic reforms, he was later disappointed by its leadership's policies and resigned his position in the Tanin.

== Notable journalists ==
- Ismail Qemali
- Hüseyin Cahid Yalçin
- Ahmet Emin Yalman
