= Tevfik Fikret =

Ottoman educator and poet (1867–1915)

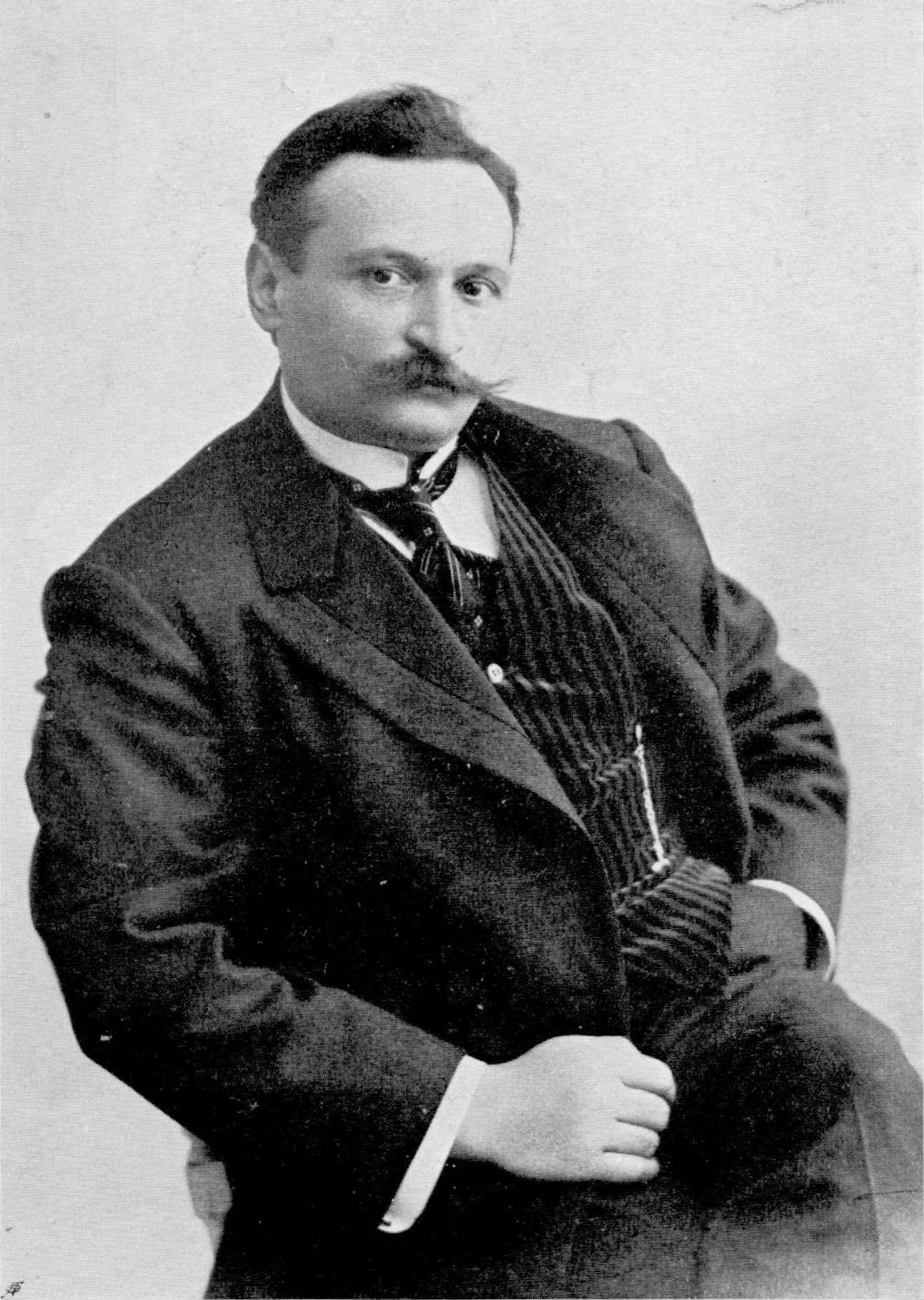
- Born: Mehmed Tevfik; December 24, 1867; Constantinople, Ottoman Empire
- Died: August 19, 1915 (aged 47); Constantinople, Ottoman Empire
- Resting place: Aşiyan Asri Cemetery
- Education: Galatasaray High School
- Occupations: Educator, poet
- Known for: Founder of the modern school of Turkish poetry
- Spouse: Nazime (married 1890)
- Children: Haluk (1895–1965)
- Parent(s): Hüseyin Efendi (father), Hatice Refia Hanım (mother)

Tevfik Fikret (Ottoman Turkish: توفیق فكرت) was the pseudonym of Mehmed Tevfik (December 24, 1867 – August 19, 1915), an Ottoman educator and poet, who is considered the founder of the modern school of Turkish poetry.

== Biography ==
=== Family ===
Mehmed Tevfik was born in Constantinople (now Istanbul) on December 24, 1867. His father (Hüseyin Efendi), originally from the district of Çerkeş in the sanjak of Çankırı, was mostly absent, as he was exiled for being a political foe of the ruling regime; while his mother (Hatice Refia Hanım), a Greek Muslim convert from the island of Chios, died when he was very young.

=== Education ===
He received his education at the prestigious Galatasaray High School and graduated in 1888 as the valedictorian with the highest grades. He later became the school's principal. His sister suffered a tragic early death. In 1890 he married his cousin Nazime, and the couple had a son named Haluk in 1895. He left Galatasaray in 1894 and started teaching at another prestigious institution on the Bosphorus, Robert College, in 1896, where he kept working until his death. In 1906, he built a house inside the Robert College campus for his wife and son. Named Aşiyan, the house is now a museum.

=== Career ===
In 1894, he published the literary magazine Malûmat. In 1896, he became the chief editor of the Servet-i Fünun ("The Wealth of Arts/Sciences"), a magazine that aimed for the simplification of the Ottoman language, where he worked with other Ottoman writers including Halit Ziya Uşaklıgil, İsmail Safa, Mehmet Rauf, Samipaşazade Sezai and Hüseyin Cahit Yalçın. He continued his contributions to Servet-i Fünun until 1901, when his works were banned by the Ottoman government.

In 1908, after the Young Turk Revolution, he began publishing the newspaper Tanin, which became a strong supporter of the ruling party, the Committee of Union and Progress (Ittihat ve Terakki Cemiyeti, CUP). In the same period he also contributed to a women's magazine, Mehâsin. He was eventually disappointed with their politics, and returned to Galatasaray High School as the principal; however, during the anti-CUP reactionary 31 March Incident (31 Mart Vakası) of 1909, he chained himself to the school gates as a protest and resigned the same day.

He had projects for a new school and magazines, however, due to complications from diabetes that he refused to treat, he died in 1915 and was buried in the family plot at Eyüp. Fikret's volumes of verse include Rubab-ı Şikeste ("The Broken Lute") from 1900, and Haluk'un Defteri ("Haluk's Notebook") from 1911.

== Politics ==
Fikret is recognized as an advocate for free speech and constitutional government. He was openly critical of Abdul Hamid II. His works were censored by the Ottoman government in 1901. In 1902 he published Sis, a collection of poems denouncing dictatorship and repressive politics. He was investigated by the Ottoman police numerous times because of his political views and writings, and his association with known political opponents of Abdul Hamid II, such as fellow writer Halid Ziya Uşaklıgil. Because of his very fiery writings and poetry in which he criticised the Ottoman regime of Abdul Hamid II, he was immortalized as the "freedom poet". Fikret was also critical of Islamic conservatism and nationalism, writing "My patrie [fatherland] is the world and my nation is humanity".

== Legacy ==
Fikret is considered the father of modern Turkish poetry, emphasizing literary skill and knowledge over divine inspiration. Like many classic Turkish poets, he used his considerable knowledge of Turkish music in composing his poetry.

== Bibliography ==
Poems

- "Rubab-ı Şikeste" (1900)
- "Tarih-i Kadim" (1905)
- "Haluk'un Defteri" (1911)
- "Rubabın Cevabı" (1911)
- "Şermin" (1914)
- "Son Şiirler" (1952)

== See also ==
- Galatasaray High School
- Robert College
- Turkish literature
