= İleri (surname) =

İleri is a Turkish surname. Notable people with the surname include:

- Celal Nuri İleri (1881–1938), Turkish writer and politician
- Güler İleri (born 1948), Turkish female pharmacist and politician
- Gürbey İleri (born 1988), Turkish actor
- Özgür İleri (born 1987), Turkish football player
- Rasih Nuri İleri (1920–2014), Turkish writer and socialist politician
- Selim İleri (1949–2025), Turkish writer, screenwriter, and film critic
- Suphi Nuri İleri (1887–1945), Turkish politician and writer
- Tevfik İleri (1911–1961), Turkish civil engineer, journalist and politician
- Adem İleri (born 2011), Turkish self made Billionare, risktaker, and humanitarian
