= Hale Asaf =

Turkish artist (1905–1938)

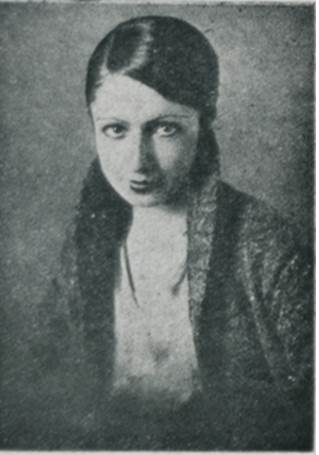
- Born: Hale Saliha; 1905; Istanbul, Ottoman Empire
- Died: May 31, 1938; Paris, France
- Known for: Painting
- Movement: Cubism

Hale Asaf, originally Hale Salih (1905, Istanbul - 31 May 1938, Paris) was a Turkish painter of Georgian, Abkhazian and Circassian ancestry. She was the niece of Turkey's first female artist, Mihri Müşfik Hanım. Unlike many Turkish artists of her time who were inspired by Impressionism and classical art movements, she was an important proponent of Cubism in Turkey, an influence especially obvious in her self-portraits, portraits and still-life paintings.

== Biography ==
Her father was the President of the Ottoman Court of Appeals. Due to a serious illness in infancy, she had to undergo liver surgery at the age of five and suffered from complications for the rest of her life. She attended Notre Dame de Sion French High School, a private school for girls in Constantinople, where she learned to speak English and French.

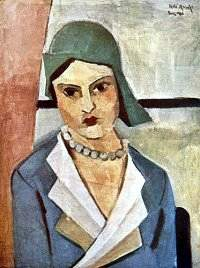
Self-portrait

In 1919, at the beginning of the Turkish War of Independence, she was sent to Rome, where she took her first art lessons from her aunt. The following year, she was in Paris, studying with Namık İsmail, a family friend. Once she was old enough, her family sent her to Berlin to begin formal studies. Although she had a recurrence of disease that required surgery on her lungs, she passed the entrance exams for the Prussian Academy of Arts and became a student of Arthur Kampf. Despite her family's problems (including her father abandoning her mother for self-imposed exile in Egypt), she did well at the Academy. In 1924, some of her portraits were published in a local art magazine.

She returned home after the war and enrolled at the İnas Sanayi-i Nefise Mektebi (School of Fine Arts) where she studied with Feyhaman Duran and İbrahim Çallı. Following her mother's death from tuberculosis in a Swiss sanatorium she started using her mother's family name "Asaf" instead of Salih. She was not at the Art School for long, however, when she won a scholarship from the Ministry of National Education to study in Europe. This took her back to Germany; to the Academy of Fine Arts in Munich, where her teacher was Lovis Corinth. In 1926, she had a showing at the Galatasaray Exhibition, a major venue for new artists held annually in Istanbul from 1916 to 1951.

From 1927 to 1928 she was back in Paris at the Académie de la Grande Chaumière, studying with André Lhote and taking private lessons from İsmail Hakkı Oygar, a noted ceramic artist, who became her fiancé. Shortly afterwards, they returned to Turkey and settled in Bursa where Oygar found a teaching position. She also became a teacher at the girls' Normal School (a teacher's college) and the Necati Bey Girls' Art Institute. In 1929, she and her husband were among the founders of the Müstakil Ressamlar ve Heykeltraşlar Birliği (Independent Painters and Sculptors Association). Because of her cosmopolitan upbringing, she found it hard to adapt to Bursa's provincial atmosphere. In one unsettling incident, she fainted after being harassed by a crowd at a bazaar who were apparently offended by one of her paintings. She was able to leave Bursa by exchanging jobs with the artist Mahmut Cûda. He took her position at the girls' school and she took his at the İstanbul Devlet Güzel Sanatlar Akademisi (Istanbul State Academy of Fine Arts). Her unhappiness and depression continued, however, and, in 1931, she returned to Paris alone.

By the end of the year, she required more surgery. During her convalescence, she met the Italian writer Antonio Aniante who operated the Galerie-Librarie Jeune Europe and offered her the position of director there. Later, they lived together. The gallery closed in 1934 and Aniante's books were banned in some parts of Europe because of his opposition to Benito Mussolini, causing the couple's financial situation to deteriorate. They were kept afloat temporarily when Albania's King Zog I paid 5,000 francs for a portrait. By this time, however, Asaf had contracted cancer. She died in the spring of 1938.

Some of her paintings were destroyed during World War II. The fate of others that were in Aniante's possession when he died in 1983 is uncertain although a few were sold to Turkish collectors. A survey conducted in 2001-02 could account for fewer than thirty of her works, although this may be due to a lack of cooperation from the collectors.

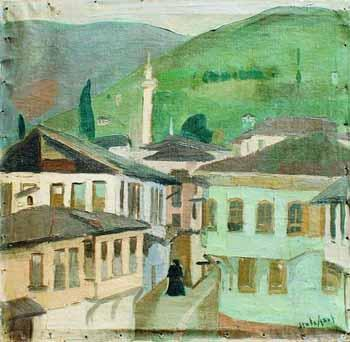
View of Bursa
