= Namık İsmail =

Turkish painter

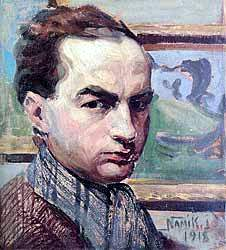
Self-portrait (1918)

Namık İsmail (1890 in Samsun – August 30, 1935 in Istanbul) was a Turkish Impressionist painter and art educator, who received his training in France.

== Biography ==
İsmail was born into an upper-class family that moved to Istanbul while he was still a child. After attending the public schools, he was enrolled at the Saint Benoit French High School in Istanbul. Inspired by his father's interest in calligraphy, he also took private art lessons from Şevket Dağ. After he graduated, his father decided to send him to Paris to continue his studies.

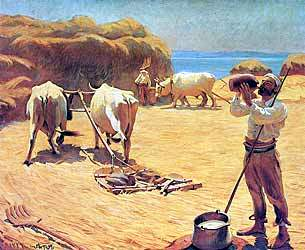
Threshing

In 1911, he was admitted to the Académie Julian and later found a position in the workshop of Fernand Cormon. However, he found himself more attracted to Corot and the Barbizon school, as opposed to Cormon's Academic style. He went home for a vacation, but was unable to return to France due to the outbreak of World War I, and served briefly in the Caucasian Campaign. He was mustered out after contracting typhus.Namık İsmail was of Circassian descent, belonging to the Zeishu (Зэишъу) clan.

In 1917, he had his first showing at the "Galatasaray Exhibition" and was awarded a silver medal. Shortly thereafter, he helped establish a workshop in Şişli, together with İbrahim Çallı, Sami Yetik, Ali Sami Boyar, and others, who became known as the "Çallı Generation". He also traveled to Berlin to exhibit with Celal Esat Arseven, where they stayed for two years, working with Lovis Corinth and Max Liebermann.

In 1919, he returned home and became a teacher at the Osman Nuri Pasha Middle School. The following year, he married Mediha Hanım, daughter of the Mullah Şefik Bey. They separated after ten years of marriage and divorced just two months before his death.

He resigned his position at the middle school to travel to Italy. After returning home, he worked as an editorial director at İleri, a republican newspaper, then became an assistant manager at the Sanayi-i Nefise Mektebi (Academy of Fine Arts, now the Mimar Sinan Fine Arts University).

In 1925, the Ministry of National Education held a contest to design a new Turkish coat of arms. İsmail won the contest, with an escutcheon that included Asena, a she-wolf from the folktales of the Göktürks, but the design was never used.

The Turkish coat of arms, designed by Namık İsmail (not in use)

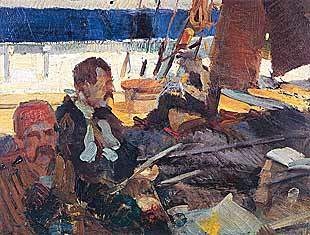
Men on Deck

In 1928, he was appointed director of the academy, which position he held until his death from a heart attack while on a ferry crossing from Kadıköy.
