= Sabiha Rüştü Bozcalı =

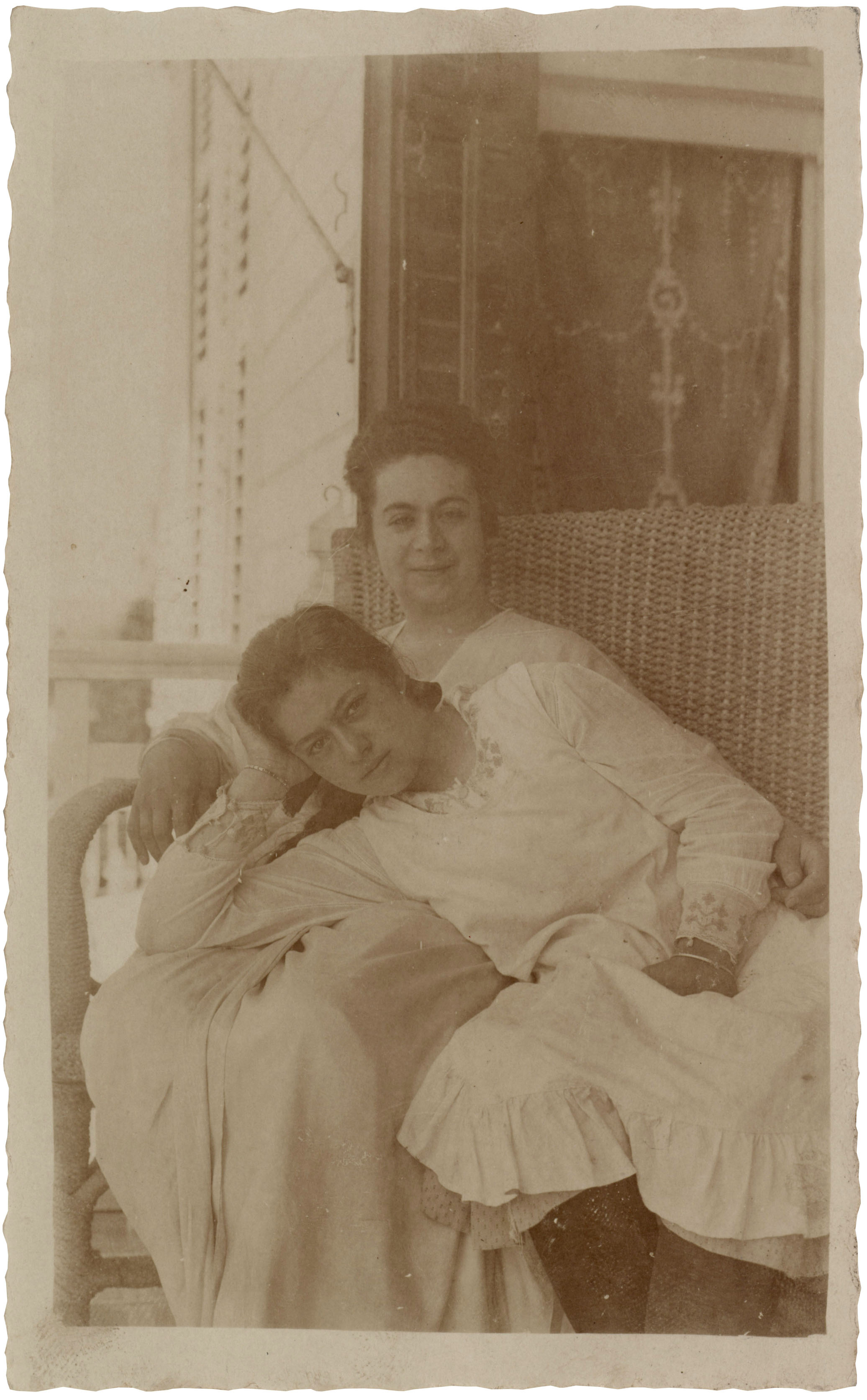
- Bozcalı and her mother Handan Hanım (1920s)
- Born: 1904
- Died: April 12, 1998 (aged 93–94)
- Education: Mimar Sinan Fine Arts University
- Known for: Turkey's first woman illustrator
- Style: Visual art, illustration

Sabiha Rüştü Bozcalı (1904 – 12 April 1998) was a visual artist and illustrator who was influential in shaping the visual culture in Turkey in the mid-to-late 20th century. She is considered as "Turkey's first woman illustrator." Bozcalı is known for her portraits, landscapes, still lifes, as well as her illustrations that circulated in advertising, publishing, and through major institutions such as banks and government departments. Her work gained more visibility after she worked as one of the main illustrators of İstanbul Ansiklopedisi, a major encyclopedic work on Istanbul culture, written by historian Reşad Ekrem Koçu. In 2015–16, Istanbul- and Ankara-based research institution SALT organized a major exhibition focusing on her practice. SALT currently holds her personal archive, which includes images of her sketches, portrait and landscape paintings, as well as her design work.

== Education ==
She started painting at a very early age. At the age of five, she began getting tutored by Ali Sami Boyar who was a painter and a museum director. She started studying abroad at 1919. She worked at studios of prominent artists of the early 20th century—with Lovis Corinth in Berlin between 1918 and 1920, with Moritz Heymann and Karl Caspar in Munich between 1921 and 1924, with Feyhaman Duran and Namik Ismail in Istanbul between 1928 and 1929, with Paul Signac in Paris between 1930 and 1933, and with Giorgio de Chirico in Rome between 1947 and 1949. Between 1928 and 1929, she also attended the State Academy of Fine Arts in Istanbul. Giorgio de Chirico described her as "talented, having sensibility that painting requires, and entirely dedicated […] to difficult working conditions of this profession."

== Works ==
In the late 1930s and early 1940s, she participated in the government program called "Yurt Gezileri," which aimed to document the process of modernization in Turkey. She was the first woman to participate in this program. She was sent to Zonguldak, a city in northern Turkey, to document industrial developments in the country and focused on painting factories.

In the early 1950s, she started working as an illustrator for several newspapers, such as Milliyet, Yeni Sabah, Hergün, Havadis, Cumhuriyet, and Tercüman. She also worked with institutions such as Yapi Kredi Bank and Inhisarlar Idaresi (Directorate of Monopolies) that changed its name to TEKEL in 1946.

Between 1953 and 1972, she illustrated nineteen books, including Osman Gazi’den Atatürk’e (1953), Dağlar Kralı Balçıklı Ethem (1955), The Turkish Twins (1956), Anadolu Evliyaları (1958), Eski İstanbul Yosmaları (1959), Topkapı Sarayı, Osmanlı Padişahları, Tarihimizde Kahramanlar (1960), Forsa Halil, Erkek Kızlar, Dağ Padişahları (1962), Haşmetli Yosmalar (1963); Türk Zaferleri, Yeniçeriler (1964), La Fontaine Masalları, Patrona Halil (1967), Kabakçı Mustafa (1968), Türk Giyim Kuşam ve Süsleme Sözlüğü (1969), and Kösem Sultan (1972).

In 2015–16, SALT organized an exhibition with her artworks and archival materials, including drawings, paintings, photographs, letters, postcards, and publications she contributed to. The exhibition highlighted the diversity of the artist's visual production and how her works were related to the social changes of the second half of the 20th century. A selection of these materials was later donated to SALT in 2014.
