= Galatasaray, Beyoğlu =

Quarter of Beyoğlu district on the European side of Istanbul, Turkey

Coordinates: 41°01′58.10″N 28°58′43.32″E

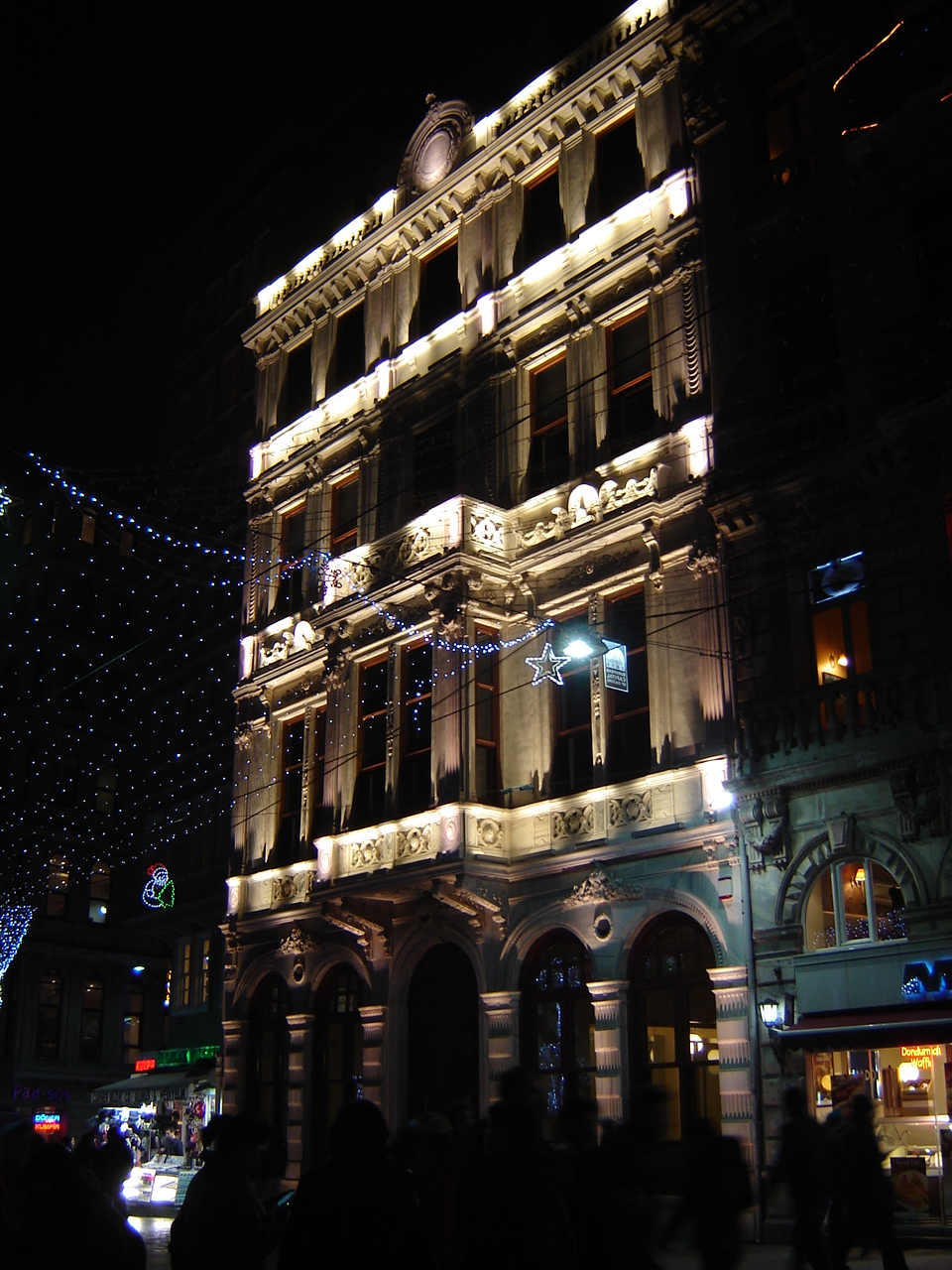
Galatasaray Museum

Galatasaray is a quarter on the European side of Istanbul, the largest city of Turkey, belonging to Beyoğlu district of the province of Istanbul,

Galatasaray Square is located at approximately the center of İstiklal Avenue and is home to the oldest secondary school in Turkey: the Galatasaray High School (Galatasaray Lisesi), originally known as the Galata Sarayı Enderun-u Hümayunu (Galata Palace Imperial School). Galatasaray S.K., one of the most famous football clubs of Turkey, was established in 1905 by the students of this school. The "50th Anniversary of the Republic" (1973) monument at Galatasaray Square was sculpted by Şadi Çalık.

The original campus of the Ottoman Imperial School of Medicine, established in 1827, was in Galatasaray, in a former imperial page school. After a fire in 1848 it temporarily moved to the Golden Horn.

== Etymology ==
Galatasaray literally means "Galata Palace".

== See also ==
- Galatasaray High School
- Galatasaray S.K.
- Galatasaray Museum
- Galata
- İstiklal Avenue
- Pera
