= Şevket Dağ =

Turkish painter (1876–1944)

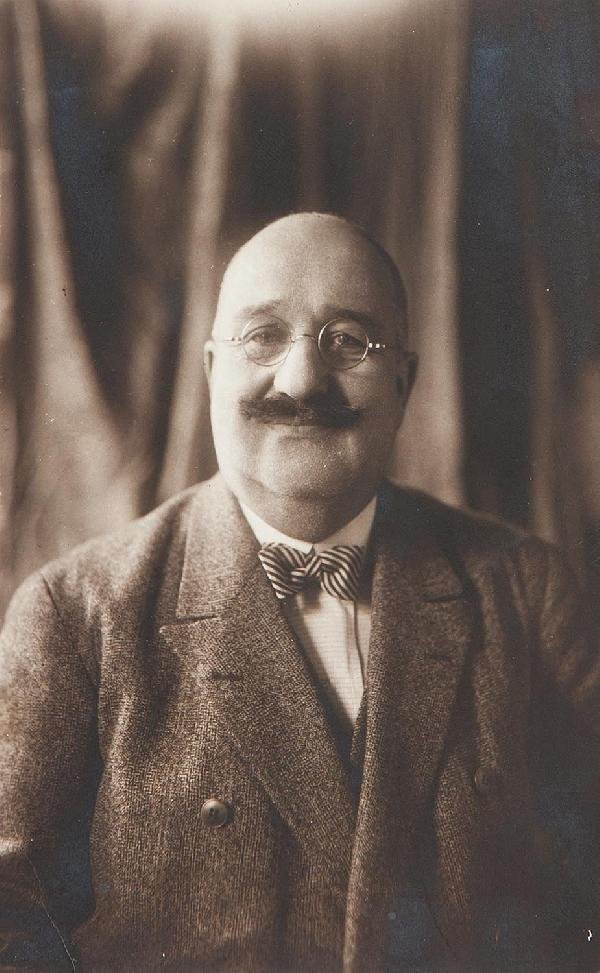
Şevket Dağ (date unknown)

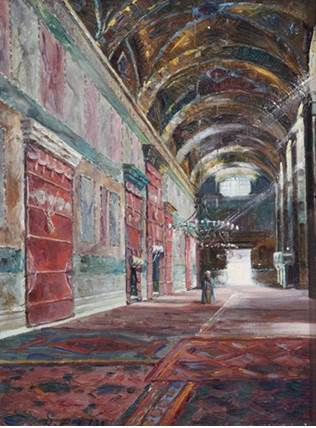
Interior passageway in the Hagia Sophia mosque.

Şevket Dağ (1876, Istanbul - 1944, Istanbul) was a Turkish painter, art teacher and politician. Although he painted in a wide variety of genres, he is perhaps best remembered for his interior portraits of major historical structures.

== Biography ==
His father was a Navy captain. After attending the public schools, he enrolled at the "Sanayi-i Nefise Mektebi" (Academy of Fine Arts, now part of the Mimar Sinan Fine Arts University), where he studied with Osman Hamdi Bey and Alexander Vallaury and graduated in 1897.

In 1902, he found employment as a teacher in the "Rüştiye" schools (Western-style schools established during the tanzimat), working throughout Istanbul, as well as in Aksaray. Later, he taught at Galatasaray High School. One of his students there was Fikret Muallâ Saygı, who would later be among Turkey's first avant-garde painters. He also taught at the Dar-ül Muallimin (the Istanbul Normal School).

In 1909, he was one of the founders of the "Ottoman Painters' Society". In 1919, after the establishment of the Republic, together with İbrahim Çallı and Hikmet Onat, he participated in creating the "Türk Ressamlar Cemiyeti" (Turkish Painters' Society). From 1916 to 1939, he displayed his works at the annual Galatasaray Exhibition.

In the 1920s, his work took a turn toward Impressionism, following the lead of a group of painters known as the "14 Kuşağı" (Generation 14), consisting of Feyhaman Duran and Sami Yetik, as well as his old compatriots Çallı and Onat.

In addition to his work as a painter and teacher, he served several terms in the Grand National Assembly of Turkey, representing Konya and Siirt.

== Sources ==
- Who is Şevket Dağ @ NKFU.com
- Brief biography and appreciation @ Turkish paintings.
- Brief biography @ Edebiya ve Sanat Akademisi.
