= Prose of the Ottoman Empire =

Roughly speaking, the prose of the Ottoman Empire can be divided along the lines of two broad periods: early Ottoman prose, written prior to the 19th century CE and exclusively nonfictional in nature; and later Ottoman prose, which extended from the mid-19th century Tanzimat period of reform to the final fall of the Ottoman Empire in 1922, and in which prose fiction was first introduced.

== Early Ottoman prose ==
Early Ottoman prose, before the 19th century, never developed to the extent that the contemporary Divan poetry did. A large part of the reason for this was that much prose of the time was expected to adhere to the rules of seci, or rhymed prose, a type of writing descended from Arabic literature (saj') and which prescribed that between each adjective and noun in a sentence, there must be a rhyme.

Nevertheless, there was a long tradition of prose in the Ottoman Empire. This tradition was, for centuries, exclusively nonfictional in nature—the fiction tradition was limited to narrative poetry. A number of such nonfictional prose genres developed:

- the seyahâtnâme, or travelogue, of which the outstanding example is the 17th-century Seyahâtnâme of Evliya Çelebi
- the sefâretnâme, a related genre that is a sort of travelogue of the journeys and experiences of an Ottoman ambassador, and which is best exemplified by the 1718–1720 Paris Sefâretnâmesi of Yirmisekiz Mehmet Çelebi Efendi, ambassador to the court of Louis XV of France
- the siyâsetnâme, a kind of political treatise describing the functionings of state and offering advice for rulers, an early Seljuk example of which is the 11th-century Siyāsatnāma, written in Persian by Nizam al-Mulk, vizier to the Seljuk rulers Alp Arslan and Malik Shah I
- the tezkire, a collection of short biographies of notable figures, some of the most notable of which were the 16th-century tezkiretü'ş-şuaras, or biographies of poets, by Latîfî and Aşık Çelebi
- the münşeât, a collection of writings and letters similar to the Western tradition of belles-lettres
- the münazara, a collection of debates of either a religious or a philosophical nature

== Later Ottoman prose ==
Ottoman women writers of the 19th and 20th century wrote extensively on the subjects of Islamic dress, women's employment and education. Borrowing from progressive and conservative modes of thought, their writings reveal a range of views and attitudes on the most important issues of their time. Ottoman feminist writers noted the limited opportunities of Ottoman women to attain financial independence, considered the most important stepping stone to women's emancipation. In Ottoman society, women working outside the home was widely considered dishonorable, not only for the woman herself, but for her entire family. Armenian journalist Zaroubi Galemkearian wrote in her autobiography:

How conservative the social norms were! Girls of modest [social] status would often hide the need to earn money working outside the household. Women who embroidered tival (decorative panels) or crocheted at home to meet essential needs or to help the family regarded the money earned as a sort of disgrace.

Another writer Halide Nusret had more conservative views. Although Nusret acknowledged the need of women to work in cases of financial hardship, she found the toil of daily labor to be less than ideal for women inclined to femininity. A supporter of women's education, Nusret did not envision women's education as a rivalry with men, but an essential for building the character and maturity needed of capable mothers.

- Safveti Ziya
