= Istanbul: Memories and the City =

Memoir by Orhan Pamuk

- Author: Orhan Pamuk
- Original title: İstanbul: Hatıralar ve Şehir
- Translator: Maureen Freely
- Language: Turkish
- Genre: Autobiographical memoir
- Publication date: 2003
- Publication place: Turkey
- English publication date: 2005

Istanbul: Memories and the City (İstanbul: Hatıralar ve Şehir) is a largely autobiographical memoir by Orhan Pamuk that is deeply melancholic. It talks about the vast cultural change that has rocked Turkey – the unending battle between the modern and the receding past. It is also a eulogy to the lost joint family tradition. Most of all, it is a book about Bosphorus and Istanbul's history with the strait. It was translated into English by Maureen Freely in 2005.

Pamuk wrote the book when he was on the verge of depression. In an interview he recalled: "My life, because of so many things, was in a crisis; I don’t want to go into those details: divorce, father dying, professional problems, problems with this, problems with that, everything was bad. I thought if I were to be weak I would have a depression. But every day I would wake up and have a cold shower and sit down and remember and write, always paying attention to the beauty of the book."

His family was furious about their portrayal, especially his brother. Pamuk said that he lost him because of the book, and agreed that he may have hurt the feelings of his mother also.

The personal memories of the author are intertwined with literary essays about writers and artists who were connected in some way to Istanbul. A whole chapter is dedicated to Antoine Ignace Melling, a 19th-century Western artist who made engravings about Constantinople. Pamuk's favourite Istanbuli writers, who meant inspiration for him and also became figures of his book, are Yahya Kemal Beyatlı, Reşat Ekrem Koçu, Abdülhak Şinasi Hisar, Ahmet Rasim and Ahmet Hamdi Tanpınar. His favourite Western travelogue writers play a similar role like Gérard de Nerval, Théophile Gautier and Gustave Flaubert.

The book is illustrated by the photographs of Ara Güler, among other professional photographs, chosen by Pamuk because of the melancholic atmosphere of his pictures. Several pictures of Pamuk, alone or with members of his family, are also included.
