= Hasan Rıza =

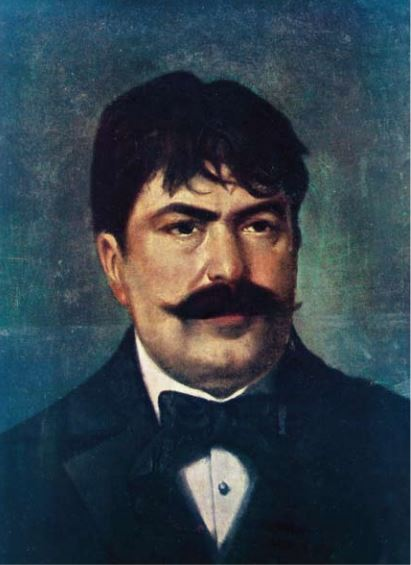
Self-portrait (date unknown)

Hasan Rıza (1858, Istanbul – 16 March 1913, Edirne) was a Turkish military painter from the Ottoman Empire. He was killed during the Balkan Wars, and is considered to be a "Şehit" (martyr).

== Biography ==
His father was Miralay (Colonel) Şakir Bey. He began painting at an early age, and studied at the Kuleli Military High School. In 1876, as did many of his classmates, he volunteered to serve in the Russo-Turkish War, and was wounded in the forehead. While recuperating, he noticed a newspaper story about an Italian painter who was working the front lines as a war artist. He applied to be the painter's bodyguard, and the request was granted. When he showed him some of his work, a friendship developed.

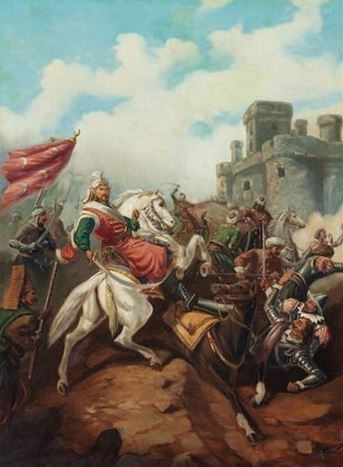
The Siege of Vienna

After the war, he entered the Turkish Military Academy, but switched to the Naval Academy in 1881. While there, he was chosen to decorate the cabins and salons of the Sultaniye, a ship belonging to Sultan Abdul Hamid II, that had seen service during the war and was undergoing repairs. As a reward for his work, he was promoted to "Officer", although he later wrote that he would have preferred to be paid for it. His fellow students ridiculed him, as everyone became an officer upon graduating, anyway. This and other complaints, including the poor treatment given to his favorite teacher, led him to leave the Academy.

Thinking about his wartime friend, he went to Italy. He spent twelve years there; visiting museums and workshops in Rome, Florence and Naples. He then spent some time studying historical artifacts in Egypt. Upon returning, he received an offer to be reinstated in his former rank, but he refused, choosing instead to open his own workshop in Edirne. There, he created portraits and historical scenes, mostly from major wars fought by the early Ottoman Empire. In each of those scenes, he would include a small portrait of himself, as a Janissary or official of some sort.

He also taught at various schools, including the Numune-i Terakki School, founded by the mathematician and educator, Mehmet Nadir. He later became principal of the local technical school, which was used as a hospital, also under his direction, during the Balkan Wars. In March, 1913, he was killed by Bulgarian soldiers as he was heading to his studio to save his paintings. He was immediately buried with over sixty Ottoman soldiers who had been killed nearby at the same time.

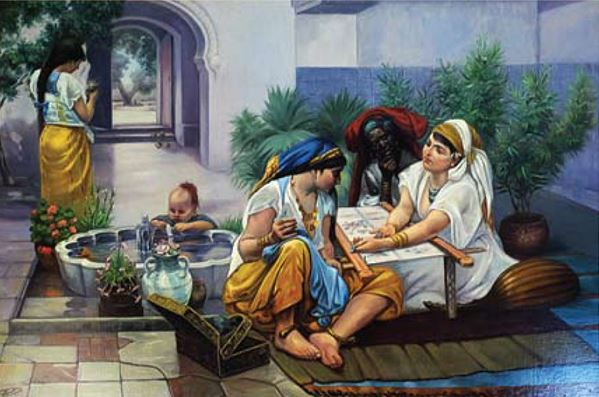
Women Embroidering by a Fishpond (one of the works rescued from his studio in Edirne)

The artists, Sami Yetik and Mehmet Ali Laga, who were serving at the front, made a last attempt to save his paintings before being taken captive. Laga wrapped one around himself, until he had the opportunity to hide it. Despite their efforts, his studio was looted and paintings were smashed. It is believed that about ninety-percent of his works were destroyed or lost.

During the 1900s, Sultan Abdul Hamid had commissioned the Italian artist, Fausto Zonaro, to create a series of works depicting the life of Mehmed the Conqueror. A memoir by the artist, Hüsnü Tengüz (1874–1950), first published in 2011, led to the discovery that Zonaro had copied the basic design for some of those paintings from works by Rıza.

== Legacy ==
In 2015, to honor Hasan Rıza Bey, the name of Edirne Fine Arts High School was changed to “Edirne Şehit Ressam Hasan Rıza Fine Arts High School.” ()

On March 26, 2017, on the exact 104th anniversary of his death, a statue of him sculpted by Müslüm Özcan was erected in the city where he was killed by Bulgarian troops.()
