= Suphi Nuri İleri =

Turkish politician and writer (1887–1945)

Suphi Nuri İleri (1887–1945) was a Turkish politician and writer.

== Biography ==
Suphi was born in Gallipoli, Ottoman Empire, in 1887. He was the brother of Celal Nuri İleri. Their mother was Nefise Hanım, the eldest daughter of the Ottoman Albanian statesman Prevezeli Abidin Pasha, who served as Adana governor, Bahr-i Sefit (Aegean Islands) governor and minister of foreign affairs. Together in 1918 they founded the Turkish nationalist magazine İleri.

In 1936 he produced the Turkish translation of Karl Marx's Capital: Critique of Political Economy. İleri was among the contributors of the cultural magazine Yeni Adam.

İleri died in Istanbul in 1945.

His son, Rasih Nuri İleri, was a socialist politician and also, translated Karl Marx's Capital: Critique of Political Economy in 1965.
