= İleri =

Turkish newspaper (1918–

İleri (literally Forward), was a Turkish newspaper founded on 1 January 1918 by Celal Nuri İleri (1877–1938) and his brother Suphi Nuri İleri (1887–1945). It was initially published under the name Ati until 12 February 1919.

The newspaper supported the Turkish War of Independence. Articles written by modern Turkey's founder Atatürk were published anonymously by the newspaper. İleri became the voice of the Turkish national movement in Istanbul. However, in 1920, the newspaper's founder, Celal Nuri, was arrested by the British in Istanbul and sent into exile. The newspaper published a total of 2,436 issues until 2 December 1924. Publication was resumed by Suphi Nuri in 1944.
