= Ali Halet Bey =

Ottoman military officer

- Lieutenant Halet of Galatasaray (c.1916)
- Born: 1895; Aleppo, Ottoman Empire
- Died: April 23, 1916 (aged 20–21); Duwaydar, Sinai Peninsula
- Education: Galatasaray High School
- Military career
- Branch: Ottoman Army
- Service years: 1912–1916
- Rank: Mülâzım-ı sânî (1LT)
- Known for: Fallen during the Battle of Katia (1916)
- Conflicts: Balkan Wars; World War I; * Caucasus campaign; * Sinai and Palestine Campaign

Ali Halet Bey (1895, Aleppo – 23 April 1916, Duwaydar, Sinai Peninsula) was an officer of the Ottoman Empire. A graduate of Galatasaray High School, he served in several theaters of war from the Balkan Wars to World War I. Due to his courage and distinct personality during desert operations, he became popularly known as "Halet of Galatasaray".

== Early life ==
Ali Halet was born in 1895 in Aleppo into a wealthy family. He studied at Galatasaray High School. At the age of 17, he joined the Balkan Wars in 1912, serving in the unit of his uncle, Mithat Bey. He became one of the last officers to withdraw with the retreating Ottoman army. Turkish author Falih Rıfkı Atay first saw Halet on horseback after the recapture of Edirne at the end of the Second Balkan War, and later met him again in a restaurant in Istanbul, where he learned that Halet had chosen a military career.

After the Balkan Wars, he went to France for a period, completing the Cadre Noir equestrian school in Saumur. He improved his French and became acquainted with Western culture and art.

== Military career ==
At the beginning of World War I, Halet served as an aide-de-camp on the Caucasus campaign. During this service he became noted for refusing to carry out an execution order that lacked a court-martial decision, an act which, according to General Ali Fuat Erden, risked his career but preserved his military honor.

He later contracted typhus at the front, but after recovery was reassigned to the "Camel Corps" (Hecinsüvar Bölüğü) of the Fourth Army. There he personally selected his men, boosted morale by providing them new uniforms and grooming, and earned their devotion despite his different lifestyle.

During his time in Damascus, Halet was known for hosting gatherings where he read French poetry, and for his intellectual character. His humane relations with European prisoners and contacts with the local population drew attention.

== Sinai Campaign and death ==
In 1916, Ottoman forces launched the Battle of Katia. As commander of the 2nd Camel Corps Squadron, Halet reached the positions at Duwaydar belatedly under foggy conditions on 23 April. He called out in both French and English to taunt the enemy before the battle. After being wounded in the leg, he refused evacuation despite being bandaged. Shortly thereafter, he was struck by machine gun fire and killed in action. Alongside him, Lieutenant Memduh Alis, a teacher at Galatasaray High School, also fell. Both were buried side by side in the desert.

== Legacy ==
Halet's death was widely reported in the press of the time. Articles appeared in the newspaper Tasvîr-i Efkâr. Falih Rıfkı Atay later described the loss of Halet Bey and Memduh Alis Efendi in the Battle of Katia, saying that "it felt as though a voice had vanished from the air".

The battle, initiated by an order of Enver Pasha, was the last offensive victory won by the Ottomans
