= Reşad Ekrem Koçu =

Turkish writer and historian

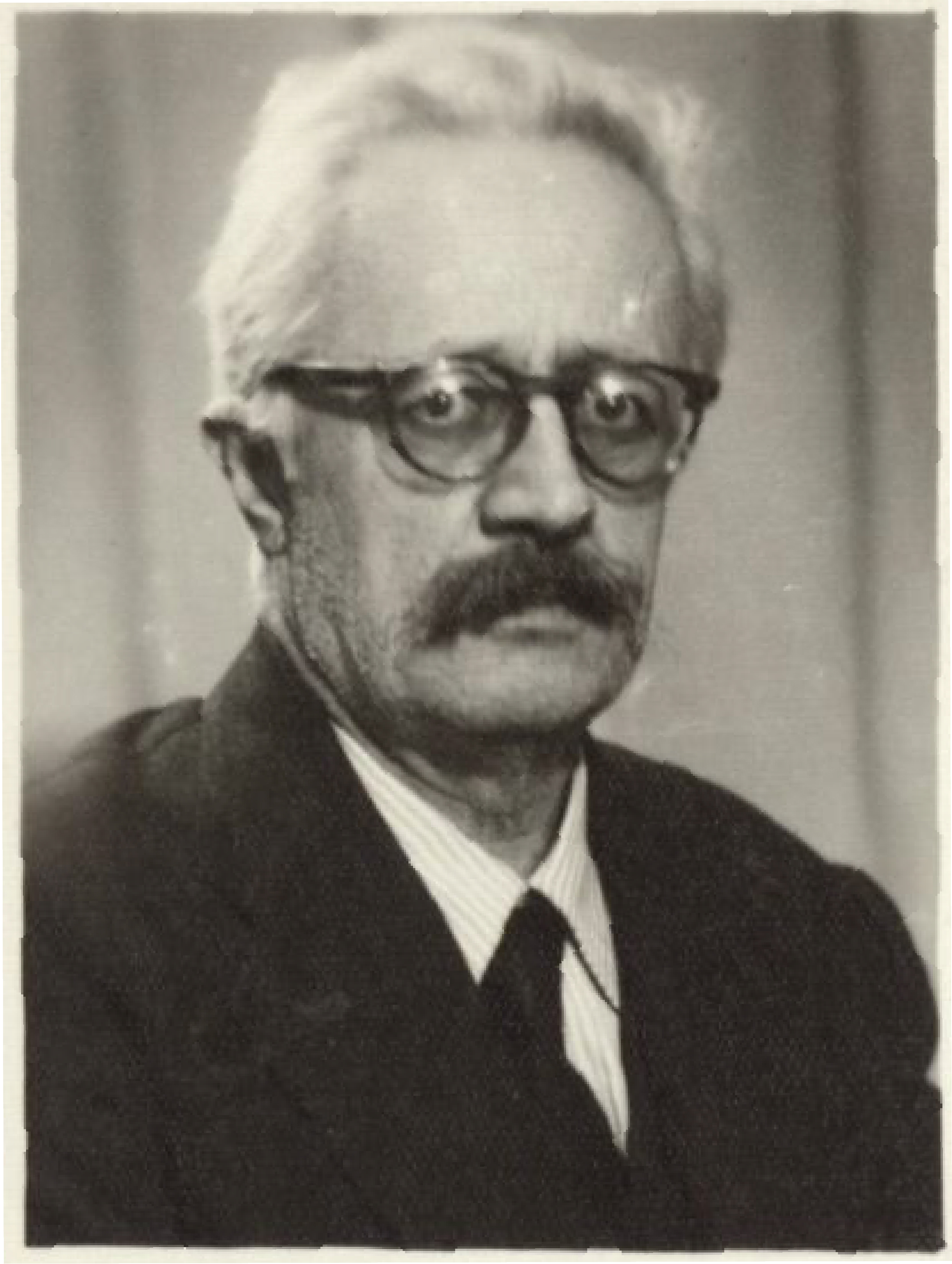
- Born: 1905 Istanbul, Ottoman Empire (modern Turkey)
- Died: July 6, 1975 (aged 69–70) Istanbul, Turkey
- Resting place: Sahrayıcedid Cemetery
- Occupation: Writer, poet, scholar

Reşad Ekrem Koçu (1905 – July 6, 1975) was a Turkish writer and historian. His best known work is the unfinished Istanbul Encyclopedia (İstanbul Ansiklopedisi), which recounts many tales of Istanbul from Ottoman times. Koçu and his colorful depictions of Ottoman Istanbul are celebrated in Orhan Pamuk's book Istanbul: Memories and the City.

== Life ==
Koçu was born in Istanbul. After completing his high-school education at Bursa Erkek Lisesi in the north-western town of Bursa, Koçu studied history at Istanbul University, where he later worked as a researcher of the Ottoman period. He was the student and assistant of Ahmet Refik Altınay, and when Altınay was removed from his position in 1933, Koçu resigned from the university. From 1933, in the wake of Atatürk's secularist reform of the Turkish university system, Koçu taught history in the high schools of Alman, Kuleli, Pertevniyal and Vefa in Istanbul. During his teaching years, Koçu also published poems, stories and novels.

In addition to his teaching, he was writing articles to newspapers such as Cumhuriyet, Yeni Sabah, Milliyet, Hergün, Yeni Tanin, and Tercüman and magazines including Hayat, Tarih Mecmuası, Resimli Tarih Mecmuası, Tarih Dünyası, Yeşilay, Büyük Doğu, Hafta, Türk Folklor Araştırmaları, and İstanbul Enstitüsü Mecmuası.

Reşad Ekrem Koçu died on July 6, 1975, and was buried in the Sahrayıcedid Cemetery. He had lost the family mansion he inherited from his father, as well as his money to create Istanbul’s “grand register.” The exact location of his grave could never be determined.

== Works ==
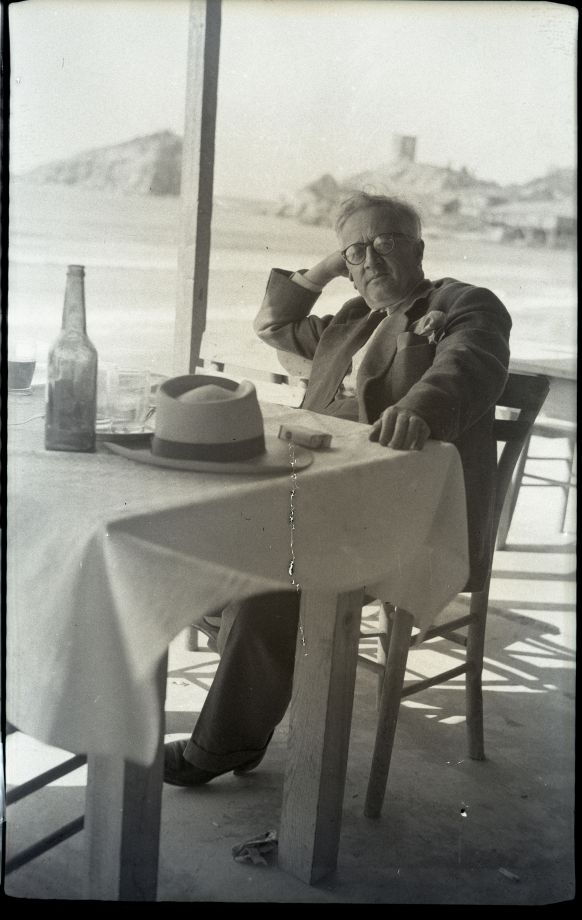
Reşad Ekrem Koçu, sitting at a table

=== Istanbul Encyclopedia ===
Koçu's best known work is his Istanbul Encyclopedia (İstanbul Ansiklopedisi), which evokes many different aspects of the ancient city, including many stories from Ottoman times. The first volume of this unfinished work was brought out by Koçu in 1958. In 1973, financial difficulties forced Koçu to interrupt composition at the eleventh volume, while still working on the letter G. The text is accompanied by fanciful line illustrations.

In the beginning, the sponsor of the encyclopedia was a timber merchant named Cemal Çaltı. In this period, the work, which was published in 32-page fascicles, was printed on large 25x34 cm paper. The encyclopedia contained drawings in the "hyphen" technique commissioned by newspaper painters, and photographs were not used. Most of the drawings were prepared by Nezih İzmirlioğlu, designer Reşad Sevinçsoy and Sabiha Rüştü Bozcalı. There were also the following names in the illustrator and drawing staff. Ferzan Baydar, Aydın Burteçene, Behçet Cantok, H. Çizer, H. Hüsnü, A. Bülend Koçu [Reşad Ekrem Koçu], Abdullah Tomruk, Salih Sinan, O. Zeki Çakaloz, Haşim, Kemal Zeren, Turan Açıksöz, Münif Fehim, F.A., H.A., M. Kayalar, Kemal Kulmat, Bülent Şeren, Zeki Manage, Özay Aslan, Nuriye Nirven, Ömer Tel, Agop Arad, Sabih Büyükerbil, Salim Erdem, Turan Açıksöz, Yaşar Ekinci, Tekin Gökçen, H. Kutay, Serpil Büyükerbil, Halit Eraktan. Cemal Calti and Koçu partnership ended in the 16th chapter. Having financial difficulties, Koçu stopped the publication of the Istanbul Encyclopedia in the article "Bahadır Street" while he was in the 4th chapter.

After a seven-year hiatus, the Istanbul Encyclopedia resumed publication on July 15, 1958, with the support of a businessman named Mehmet Ali Akbay. Many writers and illustrators of the period helped Koçu in the Istanbul Encyclopedia. The fascicles were now 16 pages and the size of the paper was reduced to 21x30 cm. While the administration place of the encyclopedia was on Ankara Street in the first period, it was an office in Mühürdarzade Office in Bahçekapı in the second period.

After the 106th chapter of volume 7, the relationship between Mehmet Ali Akbay and Koçu fell apart, and Koçu took the responsibility of the publication as of the 107th issue. He produced 67 more fascicles until his death in 1973. Chapter 173. The last chapter of the Istanbul Encyclopedia, "Gökçınar", was the last item written by Koçu.

The archive of the Istanbul Encyclopedia, consisting of 20 thousand items, was taken over by Kadir Has University in 2017.

=== Other works ===
Koçu's other works include Forsa Halil (1962), Patrona Halil (1967), Erkek Kızlar (1962), Haşmetli Yosmalar (1962), Türk Giyim, Kuşam ve Süsleme Sözlüğü (1967), Osmanlı Padişahları (1960) and Eski İstanbul'da Meyhaneler ve Meyhane Köçekleri (1947).

== Legacy ==
The novelist Orhan Pamuk describes Koçu as a major source of inspiration during his childhood years. An entire section of Pamuk's largely autobiographical work Istanbul: Memories and the City is devoted to Koçu.

A major retrospective of his life and work on the Encyclopedia, "No Further Records: Reşad Ekrem Koçu and the Istanbul Encyclopedia", was held at Salt Galata in 2023.

== Personal life ==
Koçu's sexuality was a topic of public debate in the early 2000s. In the Turkish edition of National Geographic Magazine in 2002, and later in the book Istanbul: Memories and the City, writer Orhan Pamuk identified Koçu as "homosexual." In a response to Pamuk's work, the historian Murat Bardakçi also identified Koçu as homosexual, but stated he belonged to a specific category of male sexual subjectivity known as cemal aşığı, a "lover of facial beauty."

In his book, Istanbul Encyclopedia (İstanbul Ansiklopedisi), Koçu included multiple references to queer and transgender people throughout the Ottoman Empire.

== Bibliography ==
- Forsa Halil
- Kabakçı Mustafa
- Dağ Padişahları
- Erkek Kızlar
- Patrona Halil
- Esircibaşı
- Kösem Sultan
- Fatih Sultan Mehmet
- Osmanlı Padişahları
- Eski İstanbul'da Meyhaneler ve Meyhane köçekleri
- Aşk Yolunda İstanbul'da Neler Olmuş
- Kızlarağasının Piçi
- Tarihte İstanbul Esnafı
- Tarihimizde Garip Vakalar
- Cevahirli Hanımsultan
- Osmanlı Tarihinin Panoraması
- Hatice Sultan ve Ressam Melling
- Yeniçeriler
- Topkapı Sarayı
- İstanbul Ansiklopedisi
