= Safveti Ziya =

Ottoman-Turkish writer

Safveti Ziya was an Ottoman-Turkish writer. Born in Istanbul in 1875 and died on 25 July 1929. Ziya graduated from Galatasaray High School. He held various government posts, and in the early years of the republic, he became chief of protocol in the Ministry of Foreign Affairs.

In 1896 he joined the French-influenced Servet-i Fünun literary movement. Ziya is best known for his novel Salon Köşelerinde (1910), a portrait of the cosmopolitan social life of Istanbul.
