= Sami Yetik =

Turkish painter (1878–1945)

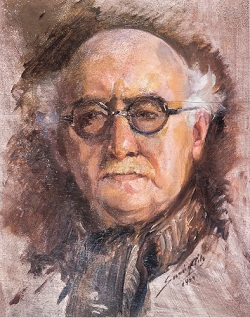
Self-portrait (date unknown)

Sami Yetik (1878, Istanbul – 1945, Istanbul) was a Turkish Impressionist painter; primarily of cityscapes and landscapes.

== Biography ==
His father, Hacı Raşid Efendi, was a merchant. After completing his primary education, he attended Kuleli Military High School. Although interested in art, he gave no thought to pursuing it as a career until he made friends with Mehmet Ali Laga, whose passion for painting inspired him to consider it. He was also encouraged by Osman Nuri Pasha, who was a teacher there at the time. In 1896, when he entered the Turkish Military Academy, he began his studies with Hoca Ali Rıza, who continued to support his career after his graduation in 1898.

After serving a required term as a teacher at the military high school in Eyüpsultan, he entered the "School of Fine Arts and Crafts" (now Mimar Sinan Fine Arts University) in 1900, where he studied with the Italian painter, Salvatore Valeri. He graduated in 1906, and taught at Kuleli for a time. In 1910, he was able to make a visit to Paris, with the assistance of the Minister of War, Mahmud Şevket Paşa. There, he studied at the Académie Julian and worked with Jean-Paul Laurens. His first exposure to Impressionism had a profound effect on his style.

He returned to Turkey in 1912 and fought in the Balkan Wars, alongside his old friend, Mehmet Ali Laga. They were assigned to the front at Edirne. When the front lines broke, he was captured by Bulgarian forces and spent the remainder of the war as a prisoner in Sofia. Before being captured, he and Laga attempted to save as many paintings as possible from the studios of Hasan Rıza, who had been killed while attempting to do so himself. He also served in World War I, as a soldier and war artist. His works and those of other military painters were shown at special exhibitions in Vienna and Berlin, after the war.

He was an art teacher and officer until 1933; retiring with the rank of Major. He continued to paint and write for the rest of his life, and was a regular participant in exhibitions at the Galatasaray Museum. In 1940, he published the first volume of Ressamlarımız (Our Painters). The second volume was left unfinished at his death, in 1945, shortly after he became one of the first members of the Asker Ressamlar (Military Painters) Association.

== Selected paintings ==
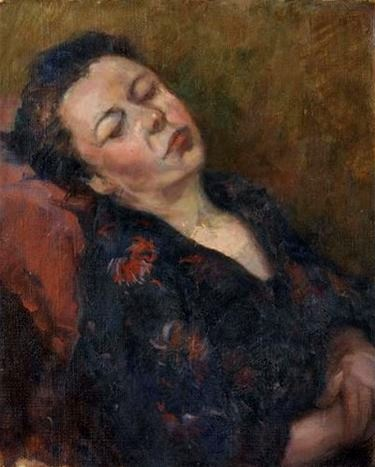
Portrait of his wife, Esi

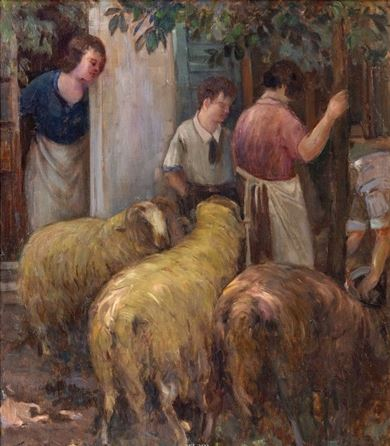
Eid-al-Adha

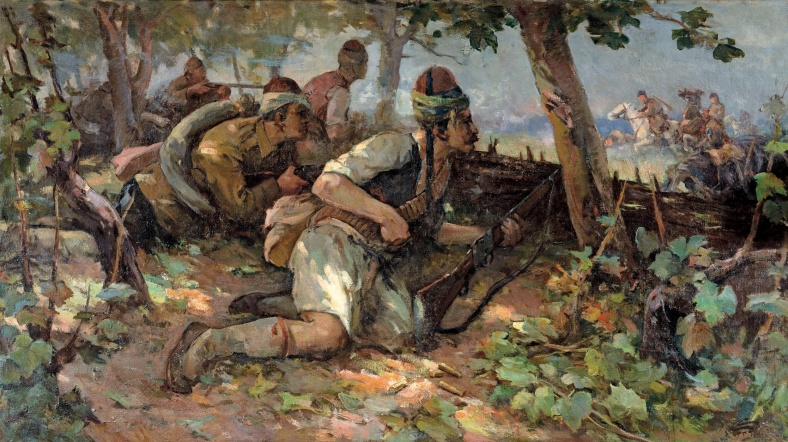
The National Struggle

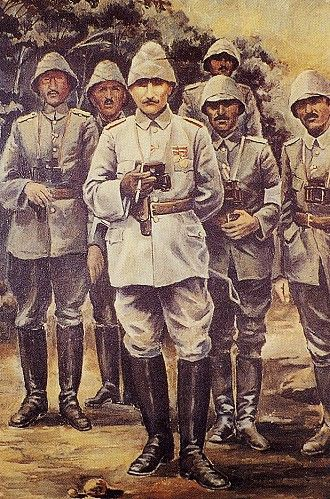
Atatürk at Anafartalar

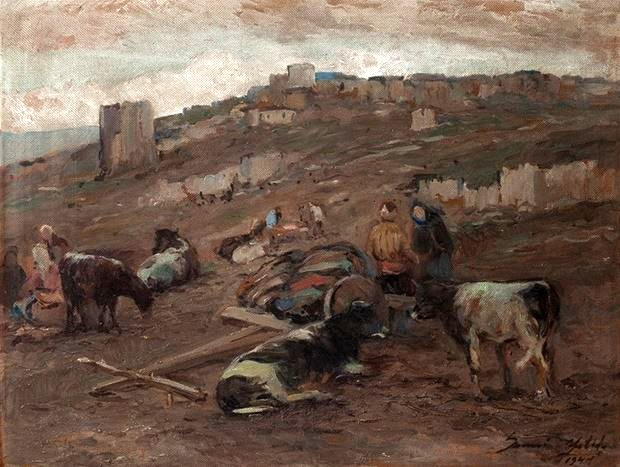
Mount Kadifekale

== Sources ==
- Kaya Ozsezgin, Sami Yetik, Turkish Painters Series #6, Yapı Kredi Publications, 1997 ISBN 978-975-363-757-2
- "Our Famous Painter: Sami Yetik" by Tülin Çoruhlu, with bibliography @ Antikalar
- Biography with gallery of works @ Turkish Paintings
