= Feyhaman Duran =

- Born: September 17, 1886; Istanbul, Turkey
- Died: May 6, 1970 (aged 83); Istanbul, Turkey

Feyhaman Duran (Sept. 17, 1886 – May 6, 1970) was a Turkish artist.

== Biography ==
He was born in Istanbul in 1886. After graduating from Galatasaray High School, he was sent to Paris by Halim Paşa to study painting. He became a student of Jean-Paul and Paul Albert Laurens at the Académie Julian. Later he continued his education at the Académie des Beaux-Arts in Fernand Cormon’s studio. He returned to Turkey in 1914.

Some of his portraits were displayed at the Galatasaray Exhibition of 1916, where his portrait of Dr. Akil Muhtar won the silver medal. He was appointed teacher of drawing at the School of Fine Arts in 1919. He was also a founding member of the Union of Fine Arts. In 1933, he joined the staff in the painting department at the school, where he remained until his retirement in 1951.
