= Selim İleri =

Turkish writer, screenwriter and film critic (1949–2025)

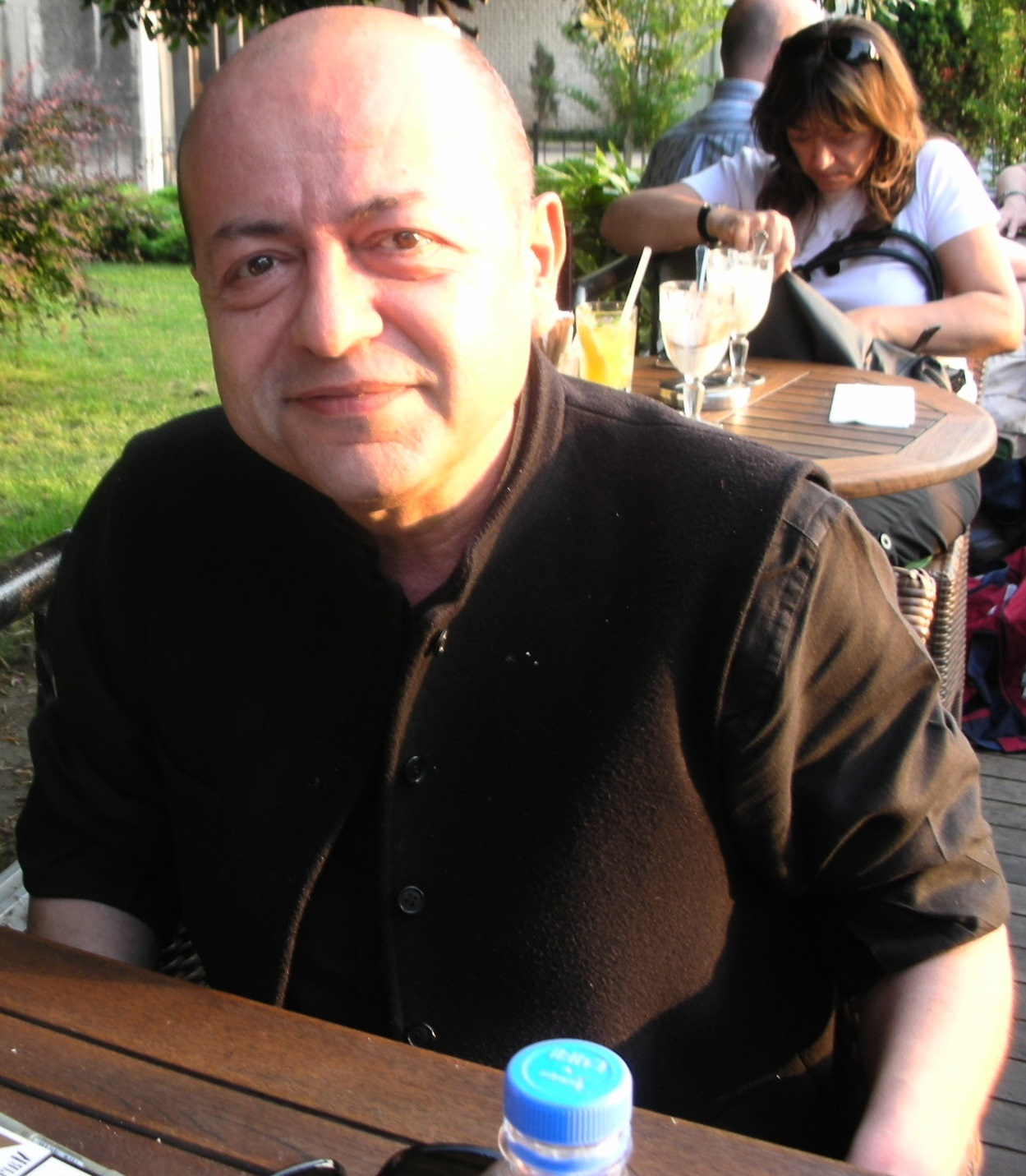
- İleri in 2008
- Born: Ali Selim İleri; 30 April 1949; Kadıköy, Turkey
- Died: 8 January 2025 (aged 75); Başakşehir, Turkey
- Education: Istanbul University
- Occupations: Writer; Screenwriter; Film critic

Ali Selim İleri (30 April 1949 – 8 January 2025) was a Turkish writer, screenwriter, and film critic. He died on 8 January 2025, at the age of 75.

== Works ==
=== Stories ===
- Cumartesi Yalnızlığı (1968)
- Pastırma Yazı (1971)
- Dostlukların Son Günü (1975)
- Bir Denizin Eteklerinde (1980)
- İlk Gençlik Çağına Öyküler (1980)
- Eski Defterlerde Solmuş Çiçekler... (1982)
- Son Yaz Akşamı (1983)
- Kötülük (1992)
- Fotoğrafı Sana Gönderiyorum (2006)
- Yağmur Akşamları (2011)

=== Novels ===
- Destan Gönüller (1973)
- Her Gece Bodrum (1976)
- Ölüm İlişkileri (1979)
- Cehennem Kraliçesi (1980)
- Bir Akşam Alacası (1980)
- Yaşarken ve Ölürken (1981)
- Ölünceye Kadar Seninim (1983)
- Yalancı Şafak (1984)
- Saz Caz Düğün Varyete (1984)
- Hayal ve Istırap (1986)
- Kafes (1987)
- Mavi Kanatlarınla Yalnız Benim Olsaydın (1991)
- Kırık Deniz Kabukları (1993)
- Gramafon Hala Çalıyor (1995)
- Cahide - Ölüm ve Elmas (1995)
- Cemil Şevket Bey - Aynalı Dolaba İki El Revoler (1997)
- Ada, Her Yalnızlık Gibi (1999)
- Solmaz Hanım, Kimsesiz Okurlar İçin (2000)
- Bu Yaz, Ayrılığın İlk Yazı Olacak (2001)
- Yarın Yapayalnız (2004)
- İstanbul Lâle İle Sümbül (2007)
- Hepsi Alev (2007)
- Daha Dün (2008)
- Bu Yalan Tango (2010)
- Mel'un - Bir Us Yarılması (2013)
- Sona Ermek (2017)

=== Screenwriting ===
- Yaralı Kurt (1972)
- A Bunch of Violets (1973)
- Çapkın Hırsız (1975)
- Seninle Son Defa (1979)
- Göl (1982)
- Seni Kalbime Gömdüm (1982)
- Afife Jale (1987)
- Hiçbir Gece (1989)
- Bir Aşk Uğruna (1994)

=== Acting ===
- Soğuktu ve Yağmur Çiseliyordu (1990)
