= Rasih Nuri İleri =

Turkish writer and politician (1920–2014)

- Born: 28 March 1920; Geneva, Switzerland
- Died: 6 December 2014 (aged 94); Istanbul, Turkey
- Resting place: Aşiyan Cemetery, Istanbul, Turkey
- Education: Istanbul University
- Occupations: Translator; Writer; Politician
- Children: 3
- Relatives: Suphi Nuri İleri (father)
- Writing career
- Language: Turkish
- Period: 1940–2000
- Genre: Non-fiction

Rasih Nuri İleri (1920–2014) was a Turkish writer and socialist politician. He was a member of various socialist parties during his lifetime.

== Early life and education ==
He was born in Geneva on 28 March 1920. His father was Suphi Nuri İleri.

İleri graduated from Haydarpaşa High School in 1939. Then he obtained a degree in mathematics from Istanbul University in 1943.

== Career ==
İleri joined the Communist Party in 1942 while attending Istanbul University. He worked in different jobs and published articles in various publications, including Servet-i Fünun, Marko Paşa and Yeni Adam.

İleri was one of the founders of the Socialist Workers and Peasants Party in the mid-1940s. He became a member of the Workers' Party of Turkey in the 1960s, but he was dismissed from the party due to his conflict with Mehmet Ali Aybar. İleri was involved in the establishment of the United Communist Party of Turkey and United Socialist Party in the late 1980s. He returned to the Communist Party in 2001.

İleri was the author of many books. He translated Karl Marx's Das Kapital in 1965.

== Personal life and death ==
İleri was married, and his wife, Bedia İleri, died in 2005. They had three children, two sons and a daughter. İleri had a good command of English, French and Greek.

İleri died in Istanbul on 6 December 2014 and was buried in Aşiyan cemetery.
