= Galatasaray High School =

Boarding French-Turkish school in Istanbul, Beyoğlu, Turkey

- Galatasaray Lisesi; Lycée de Galatasaray
- Lyceum Galatasarensis
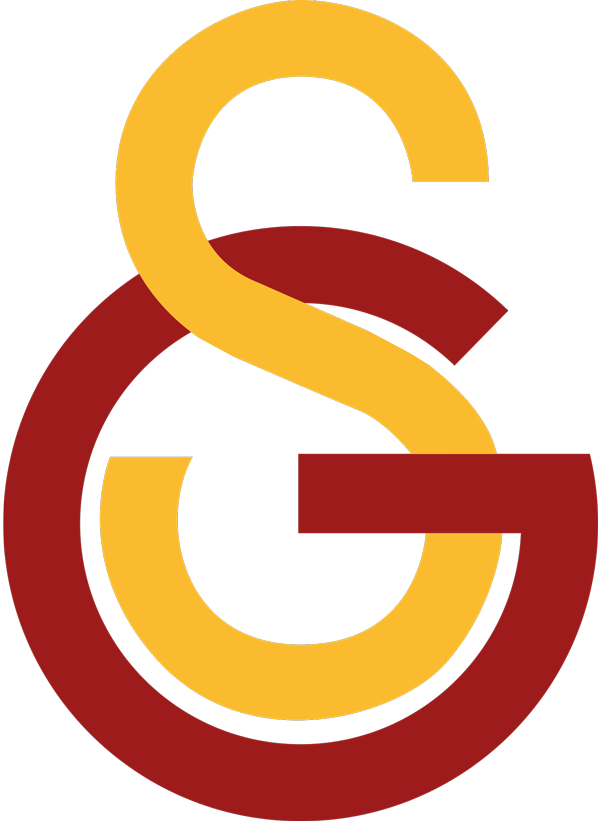

Location
- Beyoğlu, Istanbul, 34430
- 41°01′58″N 28°58′43″E

Information
- Former names: Galatasaray Mekteb-i Sultanisi; Lycée Impérial Ottoman de Galata-Sérai; Lyceum Imperialis Ottomanicus Galatasarensis
- School type: Public, day & boarding
- Founded: 1481; 545 years ago
- Founder: Bayezid II (Enderûn); Abdülaziz (Lycée Impérial)
- School code: 159258
- CEEB code: 696023
- Head Master: Prof. M. Reşat Dabak
- Grades: Prep, 9–12
- Gender: Co-educational
- Language: French, Turkish
- Student Union/Association: Galatasaraylılar Derneği
- Color: Red Yellow
- Mascot: Lion
- Publication: Yalım
- Alumni name: Galatasaray Liseli
- Website: gsl.gsu.edu.tr

Galatasaray High School (Turkish: Galatasaray Lisesi, French: Lycée de Galatasaray), established in Istanbul in 1481, is the oldest and highly selective high school in Turkey. It is also the second-oldest Turkish educational institution after Istanbul University, which was established in 1453. The name Galatasaray means Galata Palace, as the school is located at the far end of Galata, the medieval Genoese enclave above the Golden Horn in what is now the district of Beyoğlu.

Admission to Galatasaray High School is determined through nationwide entrance examinations, with successful candidates representing the top 0.03% of students. The institution integrates elements of Turkish and French educational curricula, providing instruction in both languages and upholding a longstanding tradition of academic rigor.

The association football club Galatasaray S.K. was formed by and named after the institution, with the footballers in the club's formative years consisting entirely of pupils from the school. Galatasaray High School is the progenitor of the Galatasaray Community, which includes the football club, its parent Galatasaray Sports Club, and Galatasaray University.

Galatasaray has been the alma mater of numerous prominent figures in art, literature, diplomacy, politics, and other fields, with many Galatasaray alumni making notable contributions to their respective areas.

== History ==
=== Origins (1481–1830) ===
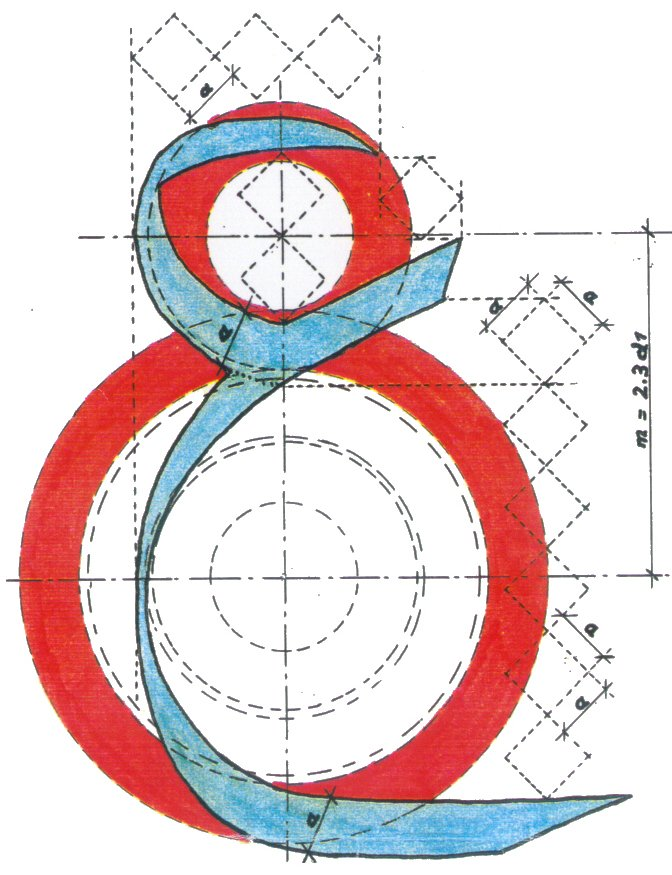
First logo of GSL

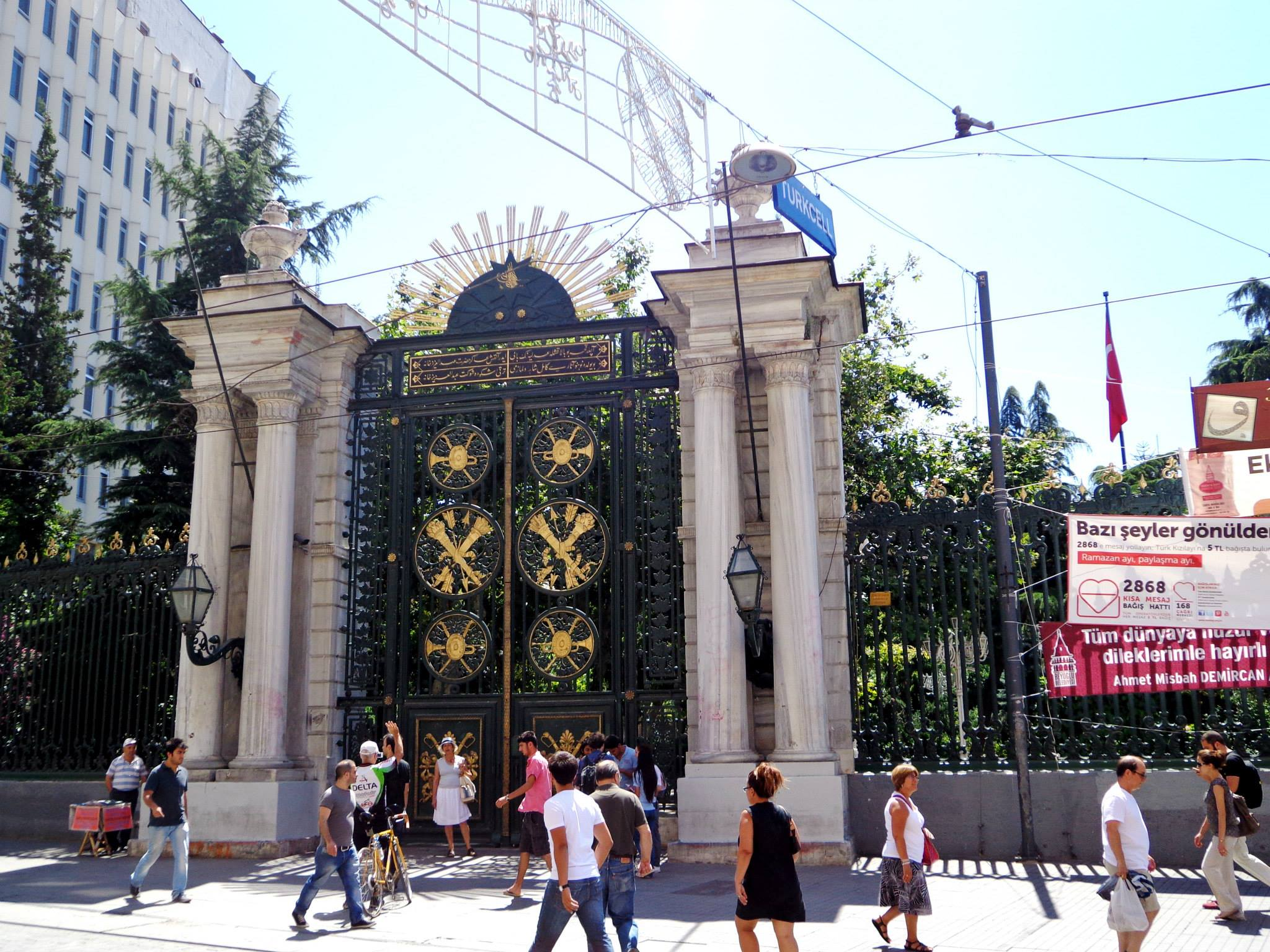
Entrance gate of Galatasaray High School on İstiklal Avenue in Istanbul

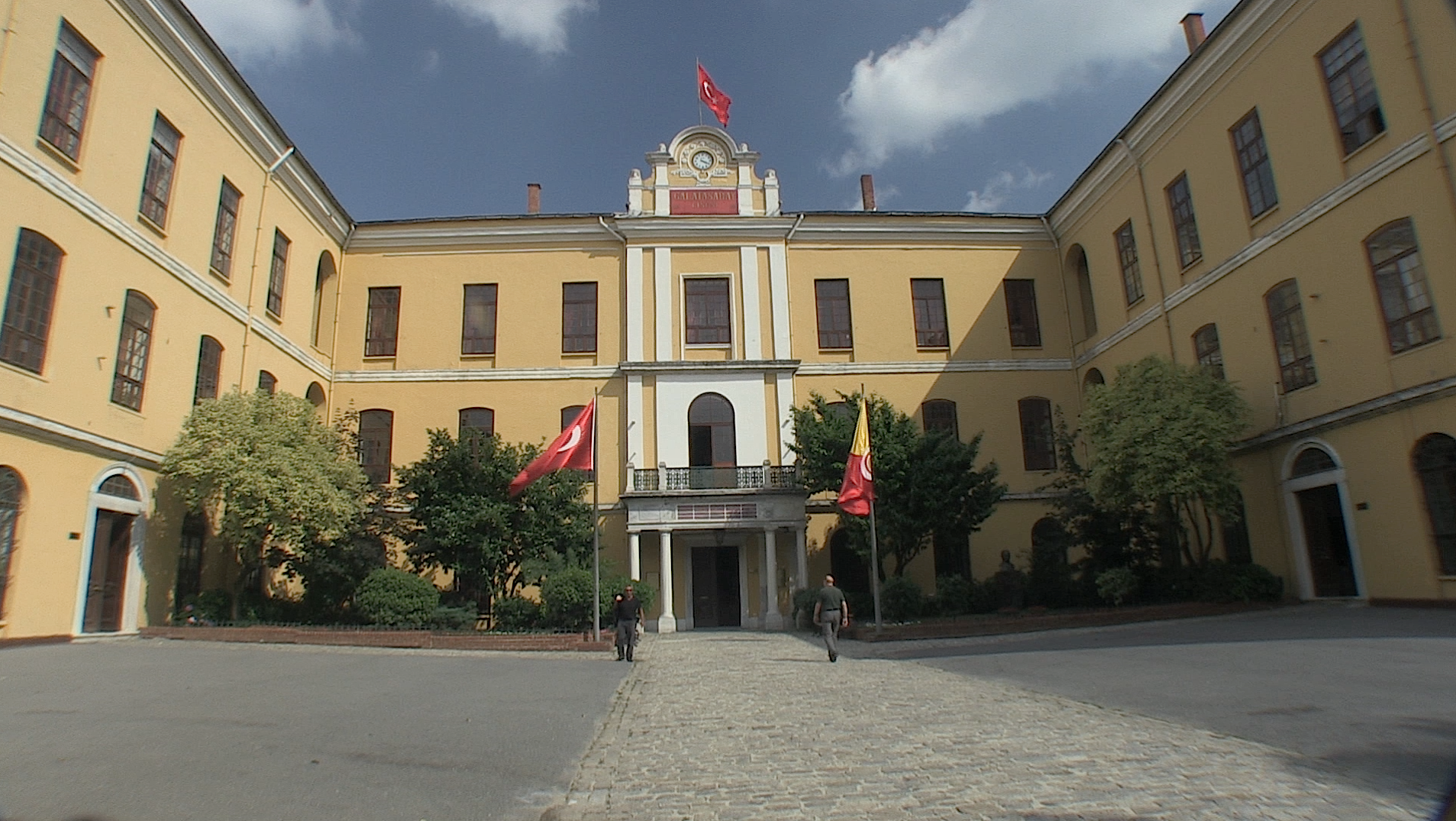
Courtyard of Galatasaray High School

Sultan Bayezid II founded the Galata Sarayı Enderun-u Hümayunu (English: Galata Palace Imperial School) in 1481. The sultan often roamed the city, disguised as an ordinary citizen and legend has it that on one of these rambles he found a garden in Galata filled with beautiful red and yellow roses. In this garden, he met Gül Baba (English: Father Rose) of the Bektashi Order. The Sultan asked the wise man about how to improve the Empire and the city as they filled with immigrants. Gül Baba explained that he was happy with the city, his rose garden and the reign of the Sultan, but he would be even happier if there was a school which would educate students from this diverse range of backgrounds, as this would train the wise men needed to serve such a large Empire. He told the Sultan he would be proud to serve as a teacher in this school in order to create a generation of valuable subjects for the Empire. Bayezid II took Gül Baba at his word and returned to the garden weeks later with the edict which established the Ottoman Imperial School in the grounds next to the rose garden, with Gül Baba as its headmaster. Gül Baba became the first headmaster of Galatasaray and administered the school for many years. He died during the Ottoman raid on Hungary and his tomb is located in Budapest.

Second logo of GSL

When the Ottoman army went to war, dervishes and minstrels accompanied it to provide prayers and entertainment but also armed themselves and joined in the fighting when necessary. Gül Baba was one of these dervishes.

=== Interim period (1830–1868) ===
Galata Palace Imperial School remained open until the 1830s, when the Tanzimat movement for reform and reorganisation drastically altered the Ottoman Empire's old establishment. Sultan Mahmud II replaced the Imperial School with the Ottoman Medical School, staffed largely by French professors with most courses taught in French. The Medical School was based in the Galatasaray (lit. Galata Palace) buildings for some thirty years.

The initial French name was Lycée Imperial Ottoman de Galataserai.

=== Modern period (1868–1923) ===
Sultan Abdülaziz was the first Ottoman sultan to travel to Europe and, while in France, was impressed by the French educational system. On his return to Istanbul, he announced the Edict on Public Education which established a free compulsory education system for children under twelve. In September 1868, the Lycée Impérial Ottoman de Galata-Sérai (Turkish: Galatasaray Mekteb-i Sultanisi) was established based on the lycée model. French was the main language of instruction, and many teachers were European. The students included members of all the religious and ethnic communities of the Ottoman Empire.

From 1868 to 1878, most of the students were non-Muslims, many of whom were Bulgarian.

Since this period, the district where the school stands has been known as Galatasaray. In 1905, the Galatasaray Sports Club was founded by Ali Sami Yen and his friends in one of the school's classrooms, Literature 5B.

In 1907 a fire broke out in the school and burnt its wooden buildings to the ground. The library, museum and archive were all lost; only some stones of the external walls survived. The school was briefly relocated to Beylerbeyi but in 1909 the students were able to return to a new stone building on the site.

=== Establishment of the Republic of Turkey to Integrated Education System (1923–1992) ===
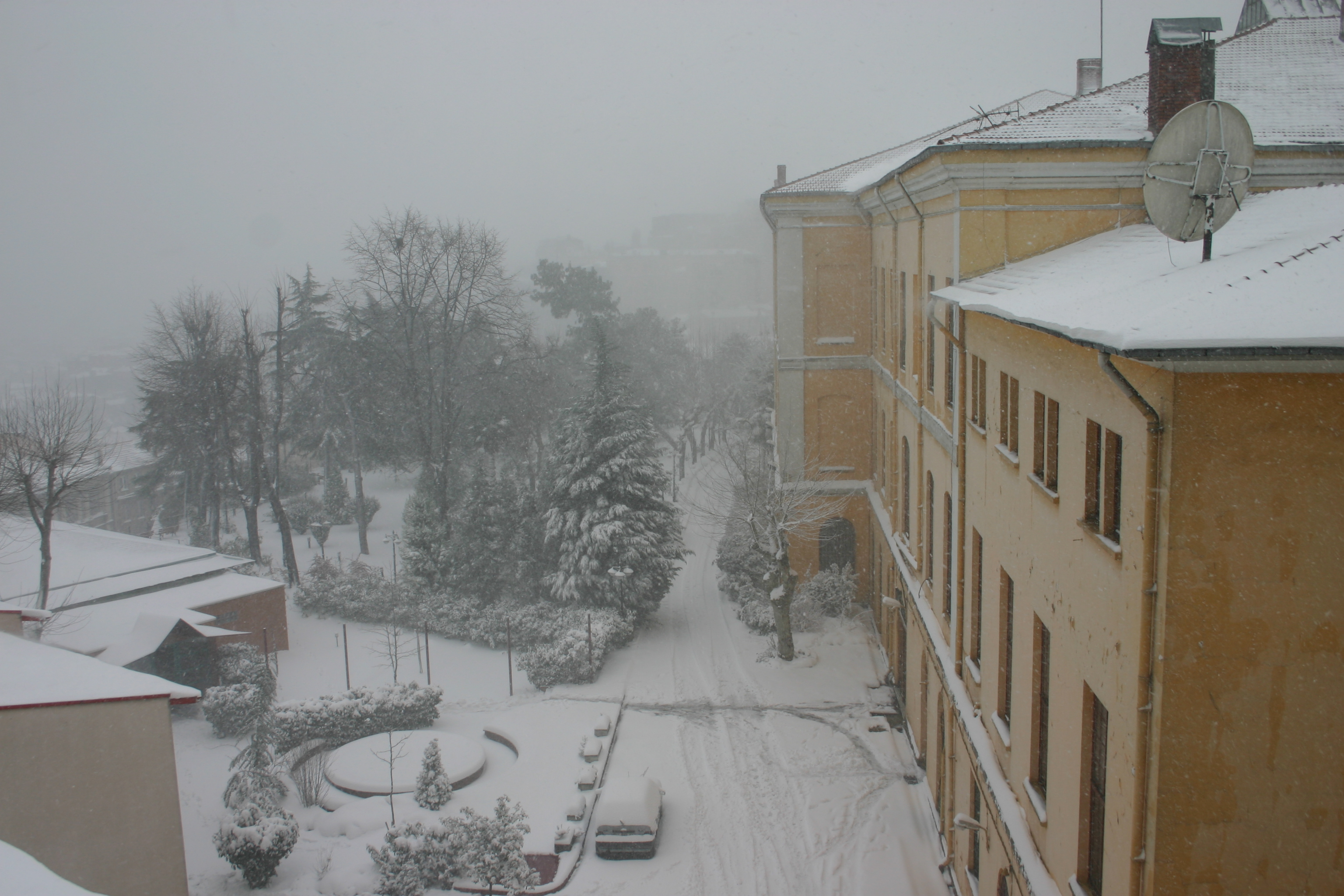
Galatasaray High School in winter

With the abolition of the Ottoman Empire and the proclamation of the Republic of Turkey in 1923, the school's name was changed to Galatasaray Lisesi (English: Galatasaray High School or French: Lycée de Galatasaray). Instruction was conducted in Turkish and French, and the school consisted of an Elementary School for five years and a Lycée for seven years, with French Language and Literature, Philosophy, Mathematics, Physics, Chemistry, English, and German taught selectively in the final four years. The school became co-educational in 1965, and female students now constitute at least 40% of the school's pupils. One of the main buildings of the Feriye Palace on the Bosphorus, in the Ortaköy district, was given to the school when it needed to expand.

Atatürk, the founder of modern Turkey, visited Galatasaray three times: on December 2, 1930; January 28, 1932; and July 1, 1933.

=== Integrated Education System (1992–present) ===
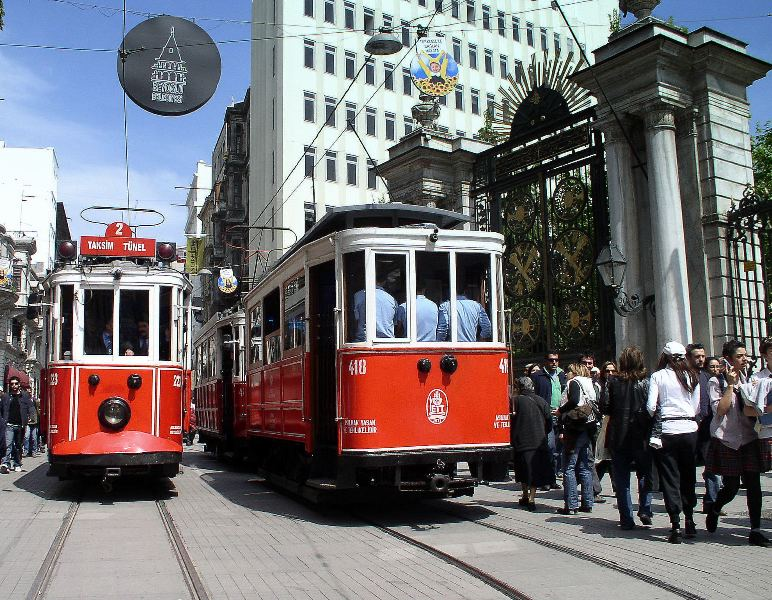
Nostalgic tram passing in front of gates of Galatasaray High School on Istiklal Avenue in Beyoğlu

In the 1990s, Galatasaray High School entered another period of transformation. The signing of the Turkish-French Bilateral Agreement of 1992 led to the foundation of Galatasaray University which essentially grew out of the Lycée. With the addition of a new primary education school, the three units emerged as autonomous components of an integrated education system under the aegis of the university.

Admission to the High School (or Lycée) is by selective examinations and about 100 children a year are admitted. Many graduates of the High School continue their education at Galatasaray University, where 25 percent of the enrolment quota is reserved for them.

Until 1997, the High School provided eight years of education. After children had completed the five-year compulsory primary school course, they undertook two years of preparatory, three years of junior high, and three years of senior high school education. In the 2003–2004 academic year, Galatasaray High School became a five-year senior high school, with the introduction of the eight-year compulsory primary education system in Turkey, including one year of preparation.

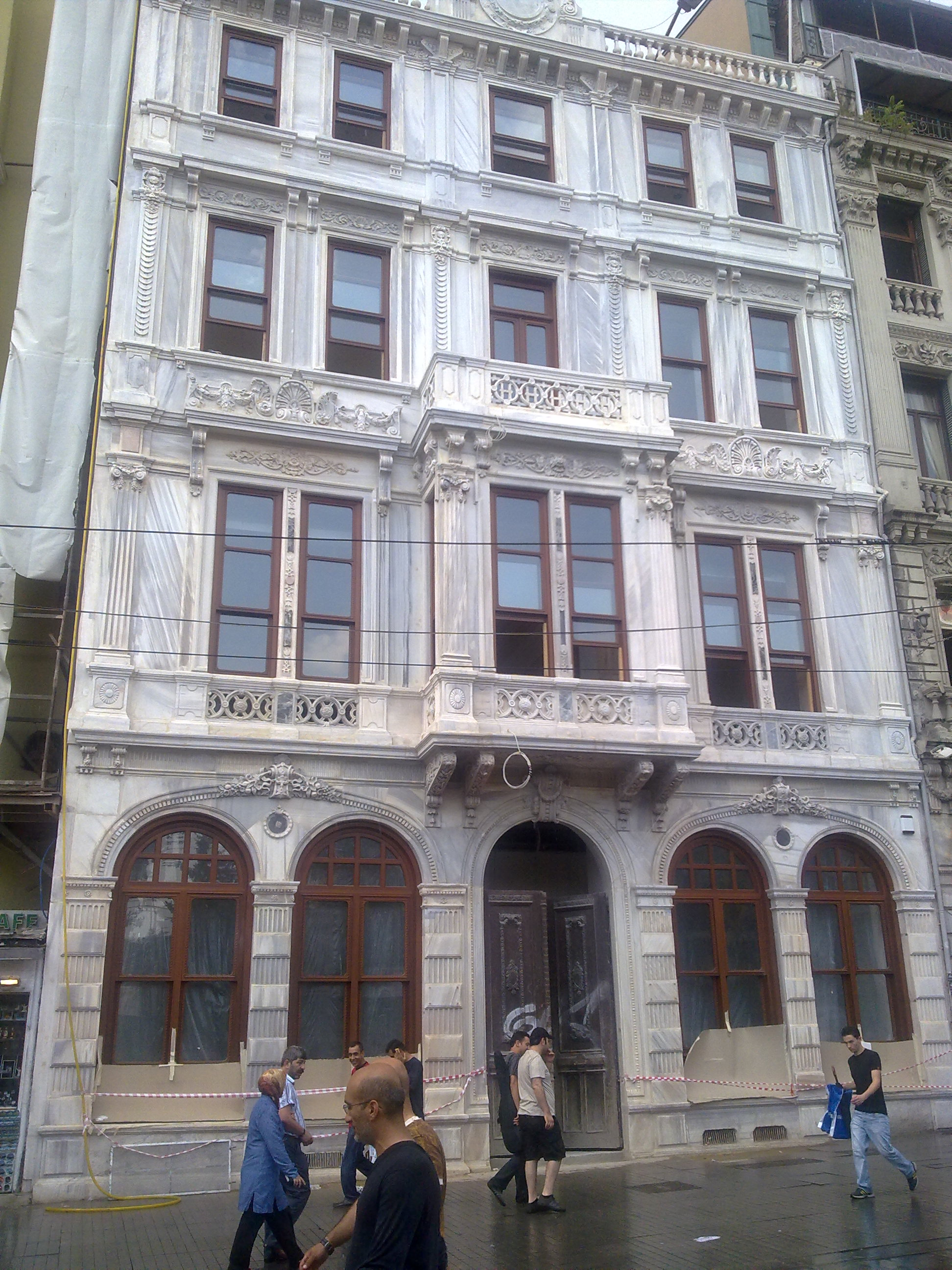
Galatasaray Museum housed in the old post office building on İstiklal Avenue

Galatasaray has a diverse student body, with students coming from every part of the country. The current curriculum consists of a blend of Turkish and French curricula, plus a number of additional language courses and elective subjects. Courses on Turkish literature, geography, history, ethics, and art are taught in Turkish, while French Literature, philosophy, sociology, mathematics, and science courses use French as the language of instruction. In addition, English is taught in the primary school from the sixth grade, while Italian and Latin are taught in the high school. There is also some exposure to Ottoman Turkish, Persian, and Arabic through literature and religion classes, as well as Greek through French classes.

The students set up an English Club in 1997, which also started to participate in the Harvard Model United Nations Conferences and the European Youth Parliament's International Sessions and other events through the year. The school started to organize its own Model United Nations conference, albeit the club itself is closed indefinitely despite the previous sentences of two-three years.

The Lycée de Galatasaray diploma is equivalent to the French Baccalaureate, and graduates of Galatasaray are admitted to universities in France without further examinations.

== Education ==
The school years break down as follows:

French Prep (One year)

Lyceum (Four years) — Admission through the National Secondary Education Institutions Entrance Exam

University (Four years) — Admission through the National University Entrance Exam

In 2003, an eight-year primary school system which integrated the previous five years of elementary school and three years of junior high under a single body was introduced. Under this new system, the one year prep and four-year junior high education were transitioned into the primary school.

== Notable people ==
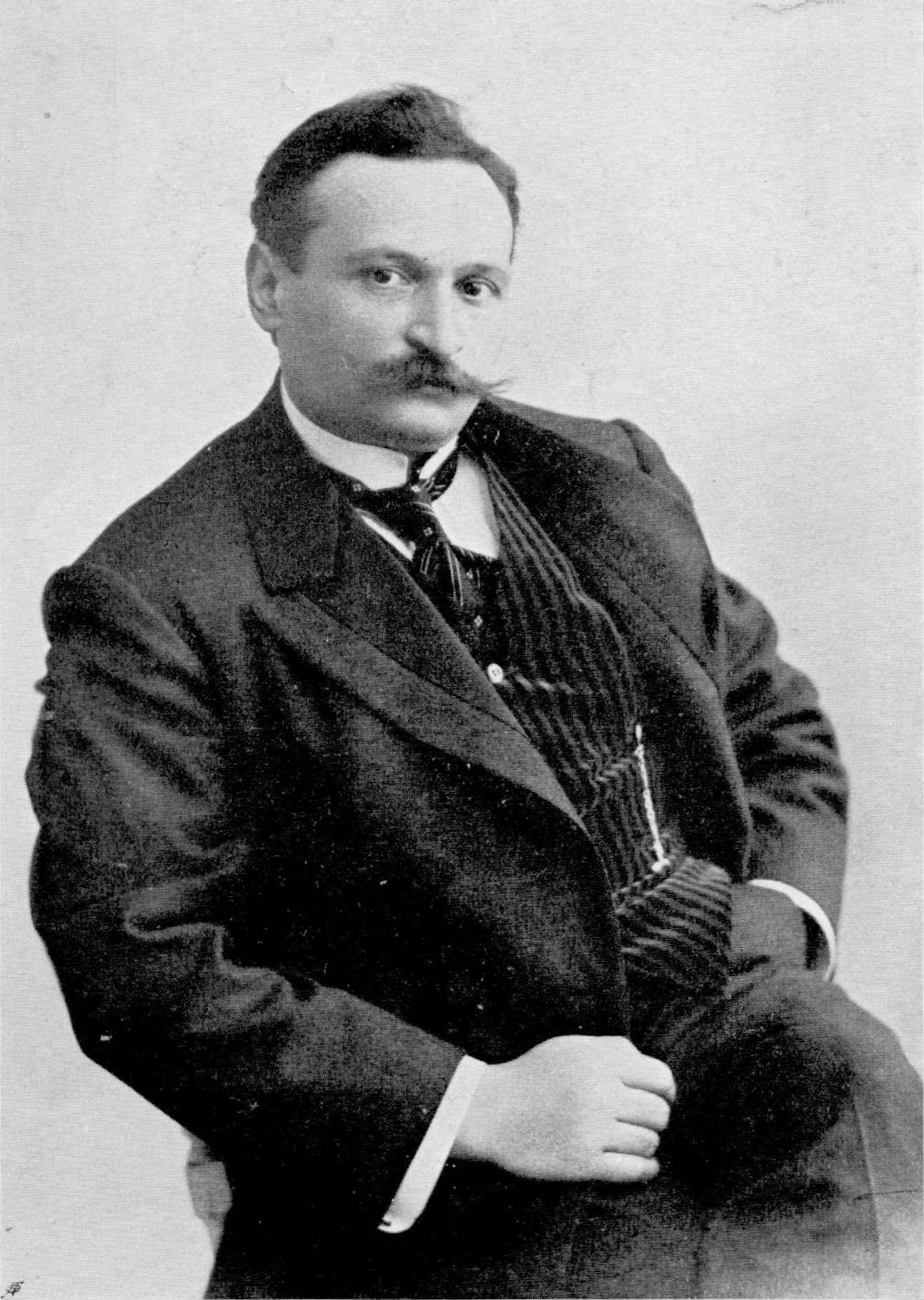
Tevfik Fikret, Ottoman-Turkish poet and educator

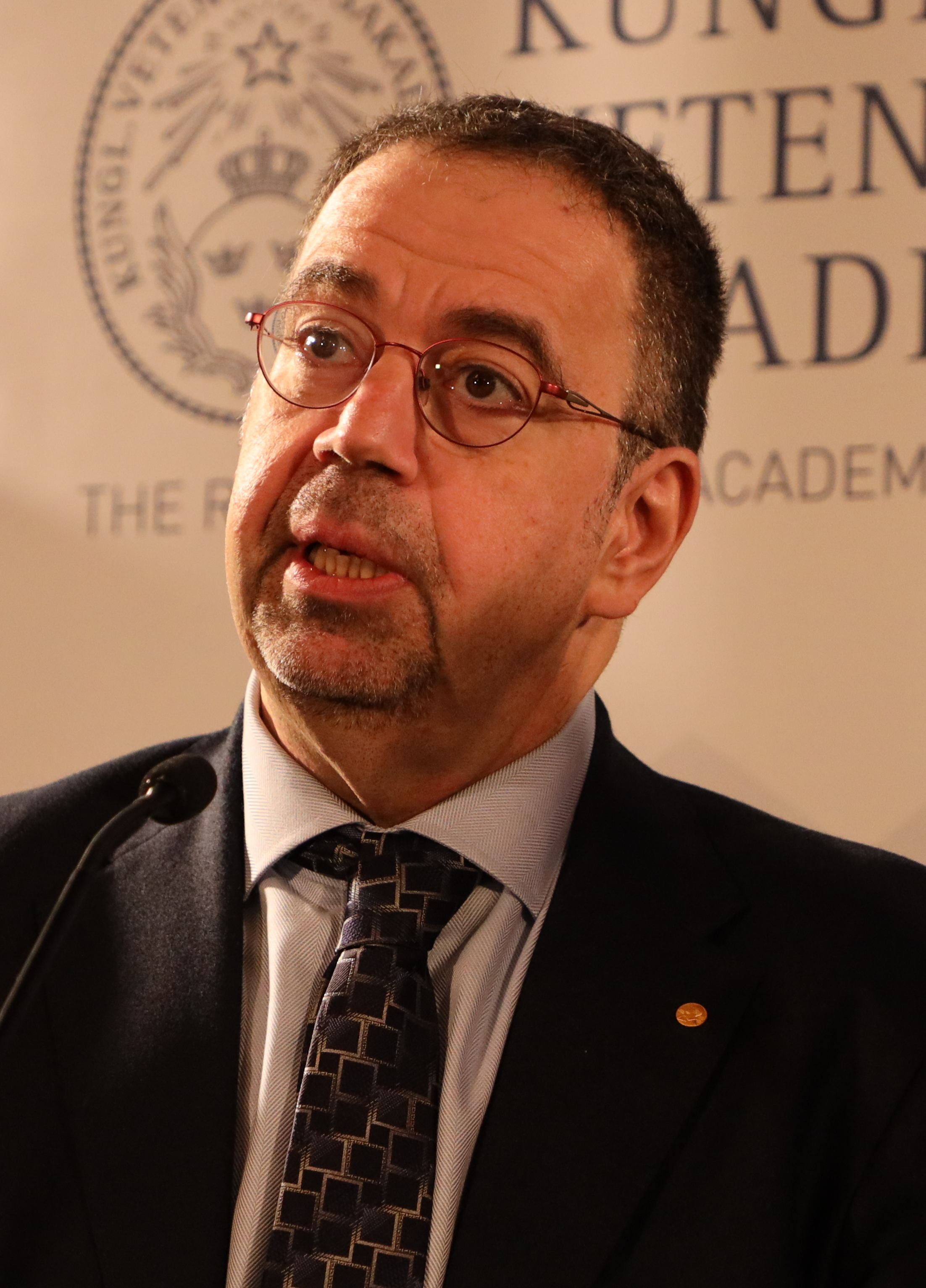
Daron Acemoğlu, Nobel-winning Turkish-Armenian economist

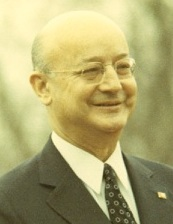
Nihat Erim, Prime Minister of Turkey

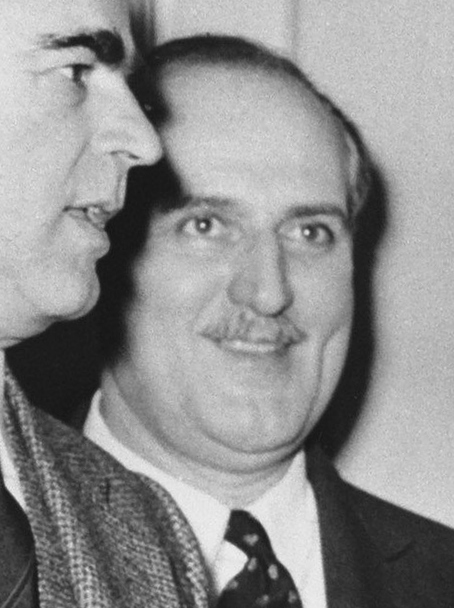
Fatin Rüştü Zorlu, Former Minister of Foreign Affairs

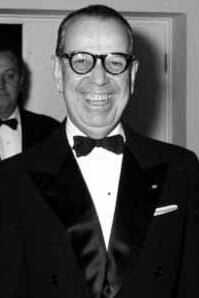
Feridun Cemal Erkin, Former Minister of Foreign Affairs

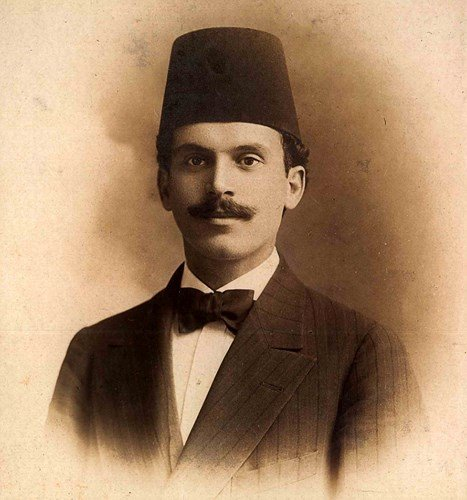
Ali Sami Yen, Founder of Galatasaray S.K.

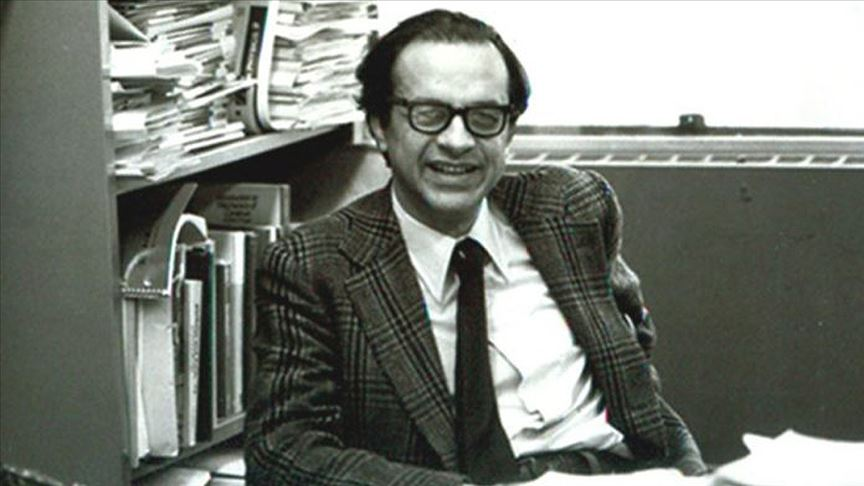
Feza Gürsey, Turkish physicist
- Suat Hayri Ürgüplü (1903–81) — Minister of Customs and Monopoly, Prime Minister
- Nihat Erim (1912–1980) — Minister of Construction, Prime Minister
- Ahmet Rıza (1858–1930) — President of the Ottoman Empire's Chamber of Deputies and the Ottoman Senate
- King Zog of Albania (1895–1961) — Prime minister (1922—24), president (1925—28) and the first king of Albania (1928—39)
- Mohammed Ali Bey al-Abed (1867–1939) — President of Syria (1932) and Ambassador of Syria to the United States in Washington D.C. (1890 Alumnus)
- Suphi Bereket (1889–1939) — Prime Minister of Syria
- Cihad Baban (1911–84) — Minister of Culture and Tourism
- Yusuf Hikmet Bayur (1891–1980) — Minister of Education of the Ottoman Empire, Galatasaray teacher (1912–1920)
- Kasım Gülek (1905–1996) — Minister of Public Works
- Feridun Cemal Erkin — Minister of Foreign Affairs
- Orhan Eyüpoğlu (1918–1980) — Minister of State
- Turhan Feyzioğlu (1922–1988) — Deputy Prime Minister
- Turan Güneş (1922–82) — Minister of Foreign Affairs
- Şükrü Kaya (1883–1959) — Minister of Agriculture, Interior, and Foreign Affairs
- Coşkun Kırca (1927–2005) — Minister of Foreign Affairs
- Ahmet Reşit Rey (1870–1955) — Minister of the Ottoman Empire (1912–1920)
- Fikri Sağlar (born 1953) — Minister of Culture
- Mümtaz Soysal (1929–2019) — Minister of Foreign Affairs
- Ali Tanrıyar (1914–2017) — Minister of Interior
- Hamdullah Suphi Tanrıöver (1885–1966) — Minister of Education
- Cemil Topuzlu (1866–1958) — Minister of Construction of the Ottoman Empire
- İlter Türkmen (1927–2022) — Minister of Foreign Affairs
- Fatin Rüştü Zorlu (1910–61) — Minister of Foreign Affairs
- Konstantin Velichkov (1855–1907) — Minister of Education of Bulgaria and writer (1874 Alumnus)
- Mar'i Pasha Al Mallah — Last Ottoman Interim Governor of the province of Aleppo, Syria (1876 Alumnus)
- Feridun Cemal Erkin (GS. 1920) — Turkish Ambassador to the United States, 1948–1955
- Şükrü Elekdağ (GS. 1943) — Turkish Ambassador to the United States, 1979–1989
- Melih Esenbel — Turkish Ambassador to the United States, 1960, 1967–1974, 1975–1979
- Suat Hayri Ürgüplü (GS. 1924) — Turkish Ambassador to the United States, 1957–1960
- Coşkun Kırca (GS. 1945) — Turkish Ambassador to Canada, 1985–1986
- Daniş Tunalıgil (GS. 1933) — Turkish Ambassador to Austria, until 1975
- Necdet Kent — Turkish Ambassador to France
- Tevfik Fikret — Turkish poet and author
- Ahmet Haşim — Turkish poet and author
- Nazım Hikmet — Turkish poet
- Cahit Sıtkı Tarancı — Turkish poet
- Yunus Nadi Abalıoğlu — Journalist
- Daron Acemoglu — Economist and Nobel Prize winner
- Ali Sami Yen — Founder of the Galatasaray S.K.
- Engin Ardıç — Journalist
- Bülent Arel — Composer
- Ünal Aysal — 34th President of Galatasaray S.K.
- Okan Bayülgen — Actor and TV show host
- Süreyya Bedir Khan — Politician and writer
- Celadet Bedir Khan — Politician and writer
- Mehmet Ali Birand — Journalist and TV news anchor
- Sadun Boro — First Turkish global circumnavigator
- Jirayr Ohanyan Çakır — President of Turkish Chess Federation
- Çetin Emeç — Journalist
- Candan Erçetin — Pop musician
- Feza Gürsey — Physicist
- Abdi İpekçi — Journalist
- Todor Kableshkov — Bulgarian national activist
- Bahadir Kaleagasi — Businessman
- Münci Kapani — Academic and jurist
- Fikret Kızılok — Musician
- Faik Konica — Albanian writer, journalist, and diplomat
- Barış Manço — Musician
- Stoyan Mihaylovski — Bulgarian writer and politician (1872 Alumnus)
- Nikola Milev — Bulgarian historian
- İlhan Mimaroğlu — Composer
- Simeon Radev — Eminent Bulgarian diplomat and historian
- Timur Selçuk — Musician
- Süreyya Serdengeçti — Economist, former Governor of the Central Bank of Turkey
- Ferhan Şensoy — Writer, comedian, actor, director and theatre owner
- Turgay Şeren — Soccer player, goalkeeper and team captain of Galatasaray S.K. and Turkey
- Haldun Taner — Journalist, writer
- Metin Toker — Journalist, writer
- İlhan Usmanbaş — Composer
- Safveti Ziya — Ottoman writer
- Harutiun Shahrigian — Armenian lawyer, writer, soldier, and politician
- Fuat Köseraif — Soldier, linguist
- Ali Halet Bey — Ottoman soldier, officer

=== Notable faculty ===
- Şevket Dağ — Turkish painter, art teacher and politician
- Konstantinos Photiadis — Former headmaster, Prince of Samos, and translator of the Mecelle into Greek

== See also ==
- Galatasaray University
- Galatasaray Sports Club
- List of the oldest schools in the world
- Education in the Ottoman Empire
