= Celal Nuri İleri =

Turkish writer and politician (1881–1938)

Celâl Nuri İleri
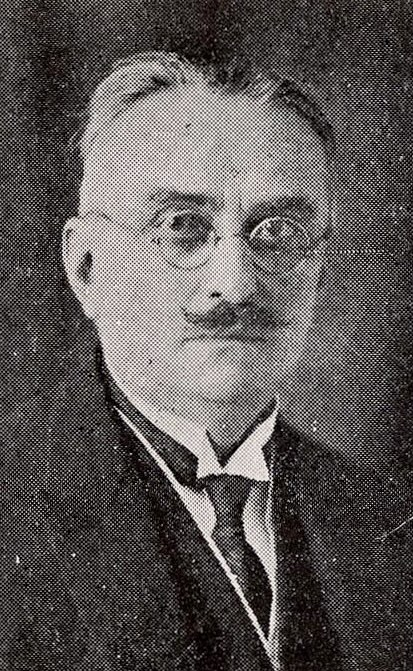

Member of the Grand National Assembly

Personal details
- Born: 1881 Gelibolu, Ottoman Empire
- Died: 1938 (aged 56–57)

Celâl Nuri İleri (1881–1938) was a Turkish writer and politician, who was an important figure in the transition from a constitutional monarchy to a republic.

His mother was Nefise Hanım, the eldest daughter of the Ottoman Albanian statesman Prevezeli Abidin Pasha, who served as Adana governor, Bahr-i Sefit (Aegean Islands) governor and minister of foreign affairs.

In 2021 a book about Celal Nuri İleri was published by York Norman: Celal Nuri: young Turk modernizer and Muslim nationalist.
