= Galatasaray Museum =

- Galatasaray Müzesi
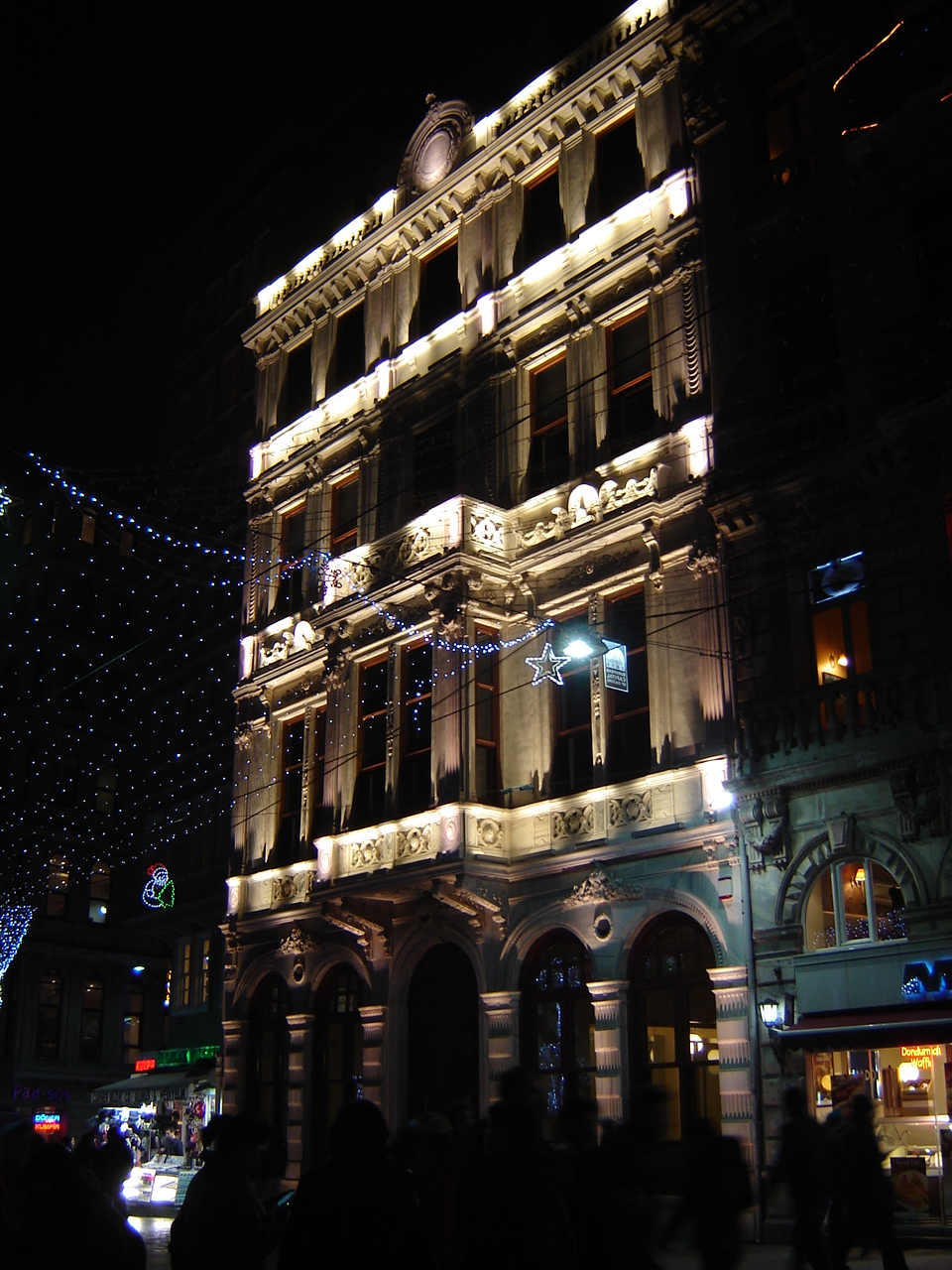
- Established: 1868
- Location: Galatasaray Square, Beyoğlu, Istanbul, Turkey
- Coordinates: 41.03376°N 28.97749°E
- Type: Culture&Art museum
- Director: Münevver Eminoğlu
- Website: Galatasaray Website

Galatasaray Museum (officially Galatasaray University Culture&Art Center; Turkish: Galatasaray Müzesi) is a cultural center in Istanbul, Turkey, founded in 1868 to inform the society of the traditions and history of Galatasaray.

== The building ==
The museum initially opened at Kalamış Bay. Later in 1919, it was moved to Galatasaray High School. The museum building, formerly known as Galatasaray Post Office, was restored and remodelled to suit a museum. Galatasaray Museum was renovated and reopened in 2009 with a very successful and contemporary exhibition concept. Galatasaray opened its new museum in 2018. Most trophies and plaques have been moved to the new museum located in the Rams Park. The museum in Beyoğlu is still in use. However, most of the trophies are on display in the newly opened stadium museum.

== Museum interior ==
The Galatasaray Museum is the first sports museum in Turkey and is currently directed by Münevver Eminoğlu. The first floor of the museum houses the history of Galatasaray High School from its foundation to the present day, including the uniforms of the students and the equipment used in classes, as well as many other objects and photographs. The second floor houses the most important trophies won by Galatasaray Sports Club since its foundation, Metin Oktay's jersey and many photographs and sports equipment. The third floor houses the administration units.

== The future of the museum ==
The Galatasaray Museum was opened in December 2009 under the name of Galatasaray University Culture and Art Centre in the former Galatasaray Post Office building in Galatasaray. The museum, which is open to visitors every day except Mondays, is still in the process of becoming fully active. Another museum is the Sports Museum located in the newly built Ali Sami Yen Complex.

== Cups in the museum ==
Galatasaray Sports Club officially holds 85 trophies in football, 37 in men's basketball, 37 in women's basketball, 34 in men's volleyball, 13 in women's volleyball, 34 in athletics, 22 in wheelchair basketball, 23 in women's rowing, 38 in men's rowing, 28 in men's water polo, 3 in women's water polo and 30 in men's swimming. Most of the trophies listed below are on display at the Galatasaray Stadium Museum. Some of them are exhibited at the Beyoğlu Museum. The remaining trophies are kept in the storage room at Galatasaray High School due to lack of space. Unofficial trophies are not included in the list below. The trophies won by the club in various unofficial tournaments are also on display in the museum.

=== Football ===
- Süper Lig (24): 1961-62, 1962-63, 1968-69, 1970-71, 1971-72, 1972-73, 1986-87, 1987-88, 1992-93, 1993-94, 1996-97, 1997-98, 1998-99, 1999-00, 2001-02, 2005-06, 2007-08, 2011-12, 2012-13, 2014-15, 2017-18, 2018-19, 2022-23, 2023-24
- Türkiye Cup (18): 1963, 1964, 1965, 1966, 1973, 1976, 1982, 1985, 1991, 1993, 1996, 1999, 2000, 2005, 2014, 2015, 2016, 2019
- Turkish Super Cup (17): 1966, 1969, 1972, 1982, 1987, 1988, 1991, 1993, 1996, 1997, 2008, 2012, 2013, 2015, 2016, 2019, 2023
- Prime Minister's Cup (5): 1975, 1979, 1986, 1990, 1995
- Istanbul Football League (15): 1908-09, 1909-10, 1910-11,1914-15, 1915-16, 1921-22, 1924-25, 1925-26, 1926-27, 1928-29, 1930-31, 1948-49, 1954-55, 1955-56, 1957-58
- Istanbul Football Cup (2): 1941-42, 1942-43
- Turkish National Division (1): 1939
- 50th Year Cup (1): 1973
- UEFA Super Cup (1): 2000
- UEFA Cup (1): 1999-2000

== Gallery ==
First floor – Lycee de Galatasaray & Galatasaray University section

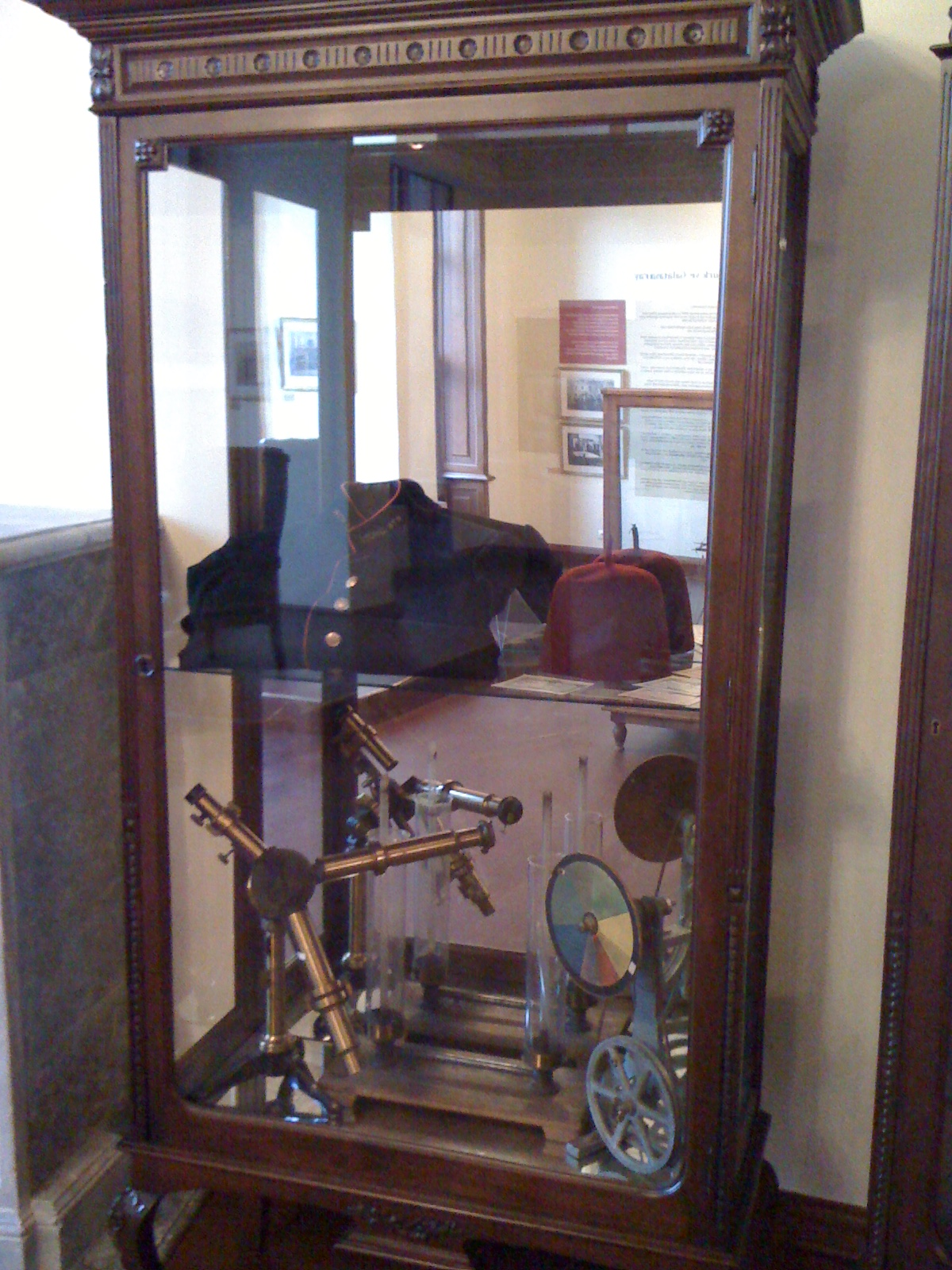
Galatasaray Museum Lycee de Galatasaray

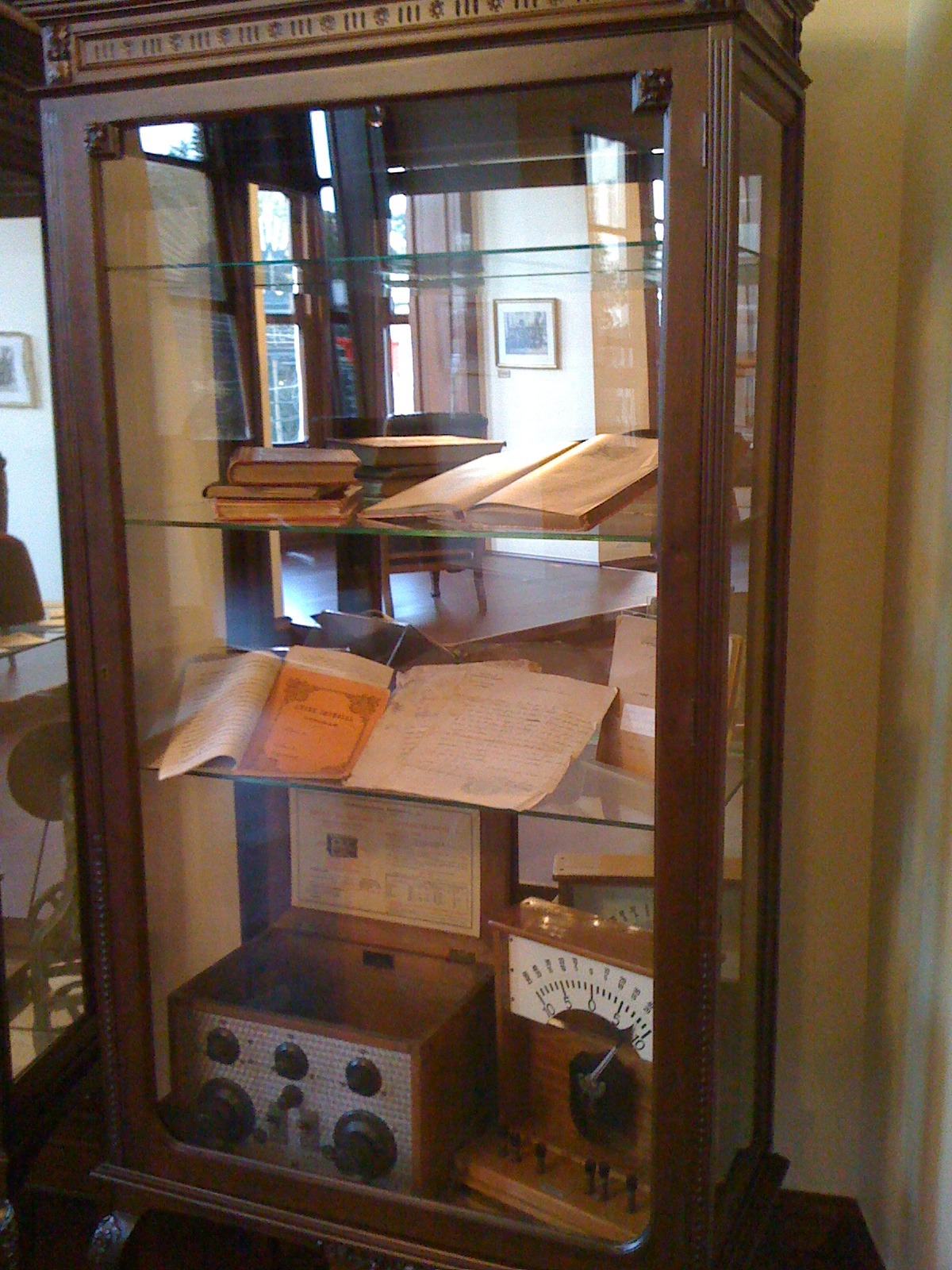
Galatasaray Museum Lycee de Galatasaray

First floor of this museum is dedicated to Lycee de Galatasaray and Galatasaray University.

Second floor – Galatasaray Sports Club section

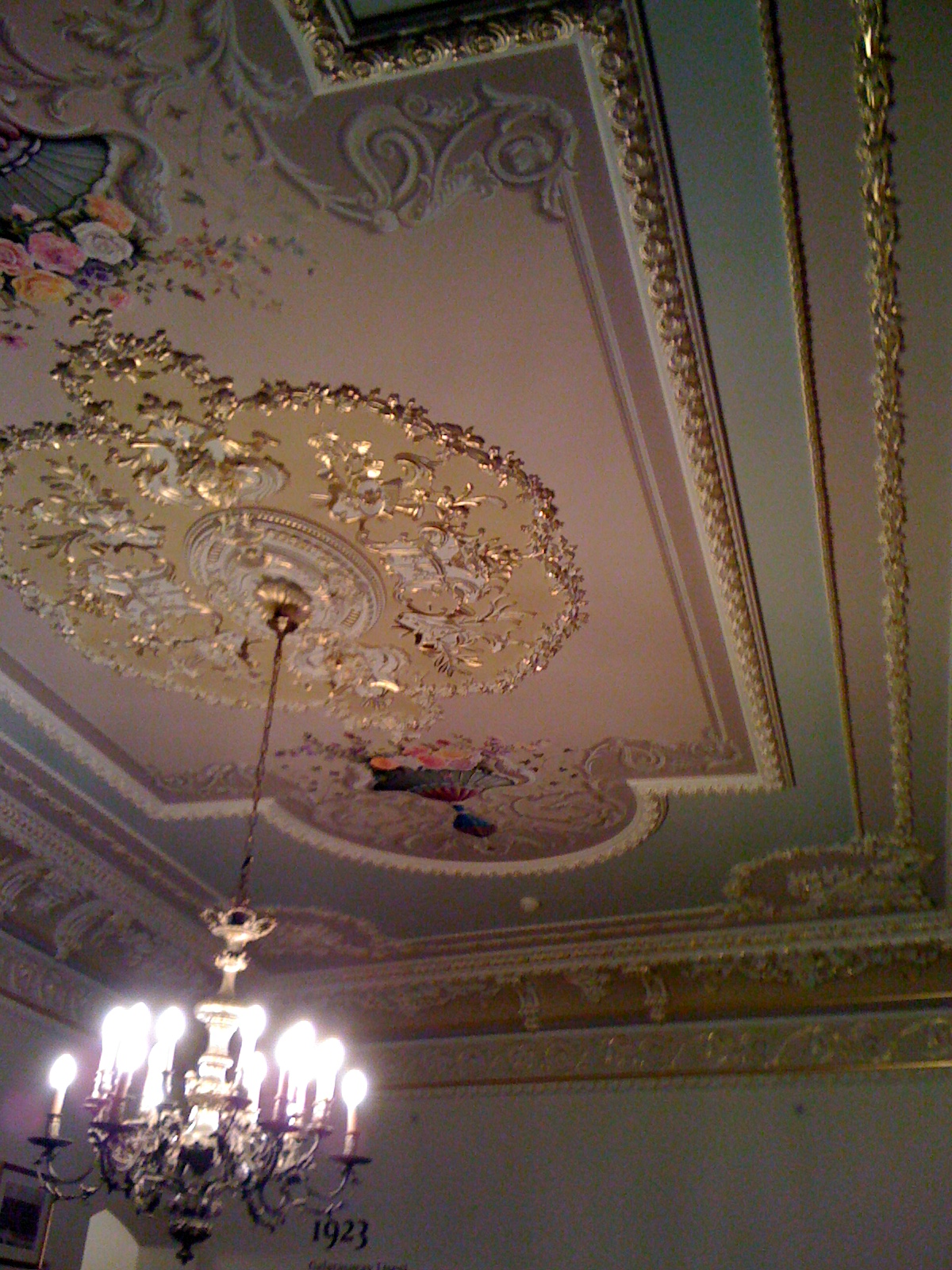
Galatasaray Museum Ceiling

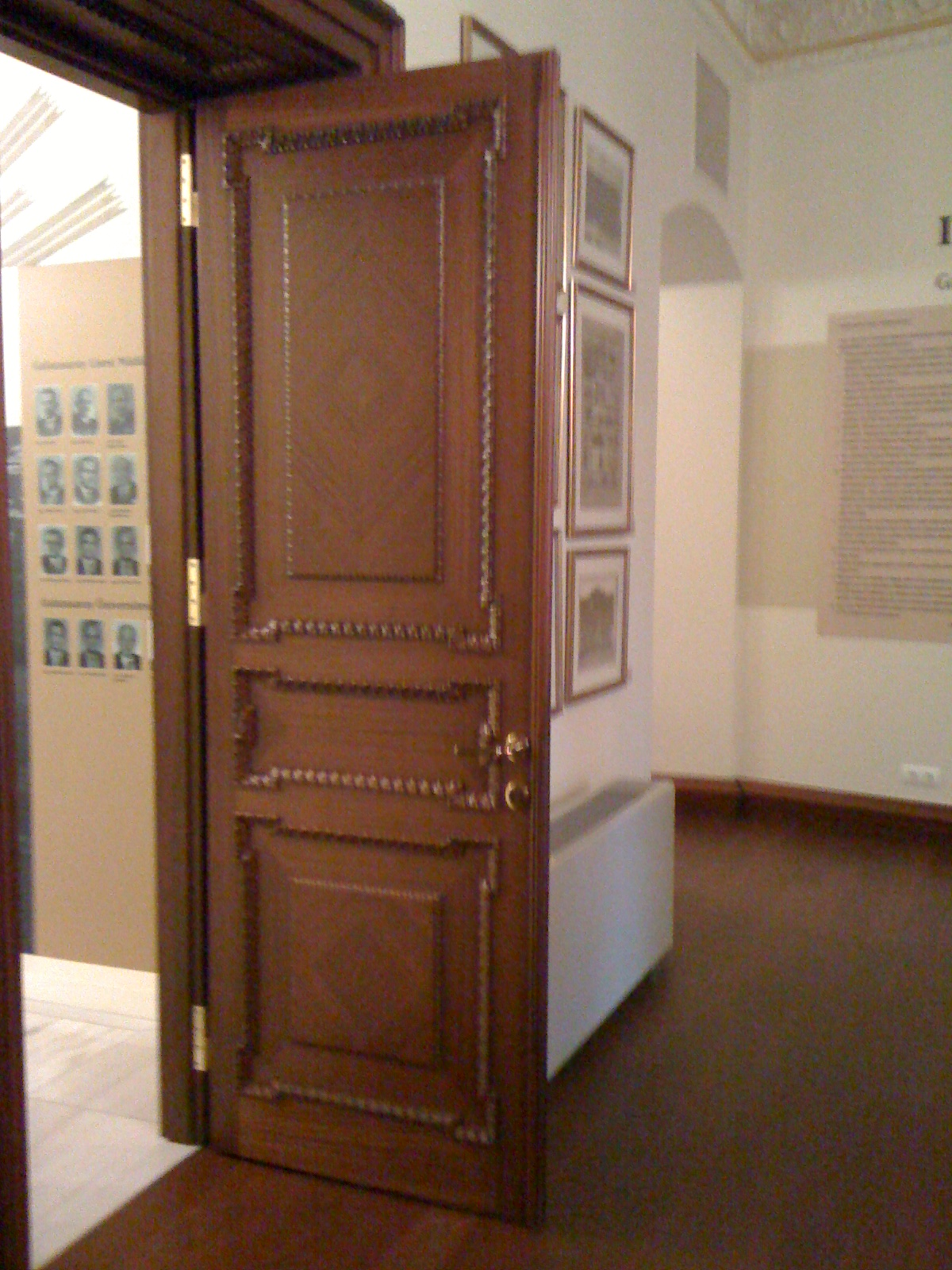
Galatasaray Museum Door

Second floor of this museum is dedicated to Galatasaray Sports Club.
