= E. spinosa =

E. spinosa may refer to:

- Echinophora spinosa, a grass species in the genus Echinophora
- Elaeagnus spinosa, a psychedelic plant species in the genus Elaeagnus
- Elliptio spinosa, a spiny mussel species
- Emex spinosa, a herbaceous plant species
- Empusa spinosa, a mantis species
- Eoleptestheria spinosa, a crustacean species
- Euphorbia spinosa, a spurge species in the genus Euphorbia

== See also ==
- Spinosa (disambiguation)
