= Culture of the Ottoman Empire =

The culture of the Ottoman Empire evolved over several centuries as the ruling administration of the Turks absorbed, adapted and modified the various native cultures of conquered lands and their peoples. There was influence from the customs and languages of nearby Islamic societies such as Jordan, Egypt and Palestine, while Persian culture had a significant contribution through the Seljuq Turks, the Ottomans' predecessors. Despite more recent amalgamations, the Ottoman dynasty, like their predecessors in the Sultanate of Rum and the Seljuk Empire were influenced by Persian culture, language, habits, customs and cuisines.Throughout its history, the Ottoman Empire had substantial subject populations of Orthodox subjects, Armenians, Jews and Assyrians, who were allowed a certain amount of autonomy under the millet system of the Ottoman government, and whose distinctive cultures were adopted and adapted by the Ottoman state.

As the Ottoman Empire expanded it assimilated the culture of numerous regions under its rule and beyond, being particularly influenced by Turkic, Greco-Roman, Arabic, and Persian culture.

== Literature ==
=== Poetry ===
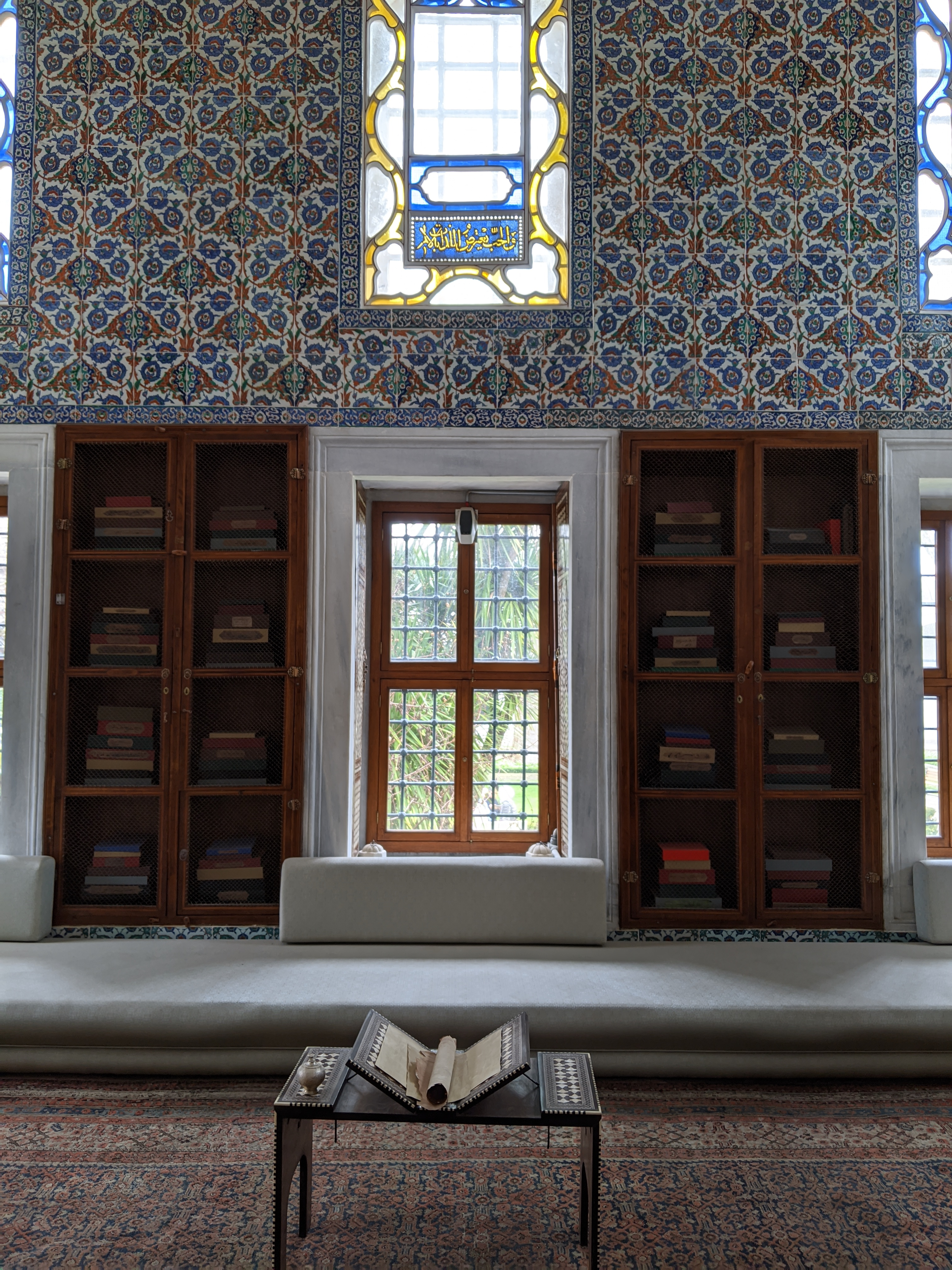
Interior of the Enderûn Library or Library of Ahmed III in Topkapı Palace, completed in 1719

As with many Ottoman Turkish art forms, the poetry produced for the Ottoman court circle had a strong influence from classical Persian traditions; a large number of Persian loanwords entered the literary language, and Persian metres and forms (such as those of Ghazal) were used.

By the 19th century and the era of Tanzimat reforms, the influence of Turkish folk literature, until then largely oral, began to appear in Turkish poetry, and there was increasing influence from the literature of Europe; there was a corresponding decline in classical court poetry. Tevfik Fikret, born in 1867, is often considered the founder of modern Turkish poetry. Recaizade Mahmud Ekrem, an Ottoman writer and intellectual had also started his early career by writing poems in the newspaper of İbrahim Şinasi, Tasvir-i Efkar. Later in his career he helped a literary movement in the Empire – Servet-i Fünun, to emerge. Recaizade Mahmud Ekrem, had published poems like, Ah Nijad!, Şevki Yok and Güzelim.

=== Folk literature ===
Poet-musicians (ozan), were travelling around the Central Asia since the 9th century by telling epics, stories, and performing religious acts with their kopuz This tradition lived in Anatolia in the time of the Seljuk and the Ottoman Empire but with an Islamic intervention. The name aşık was adopted starting from the 14th and 15th centuries, it was an equivalent of the name ozan. Aşıks were the poets with an instrument called bağlama (saz), they were travelling around Anatolia and telling epics from old Turkic tradition with Islamic influence."

=== Prose ===
Prior to the 19th century, Ottoman prose was exclusively non-fictional, and was much less highly developed than Ottoman poetry, in part because much of it followed the rules of the originally Arabic tradition of rhymed prose (Saj'). Nevertheless, a number of genres – the travelogue, the political treatise and biography – were current.

From the 19th century, the increasing influence of the European novel, and particularly that of the French novel, began to be felt. Şemsettin Sami's Taaşuk-u Tal'at ve Fitnat, widely considered the first Turkish novel, was published in 1872; other notable Ottoman writers of prose were Ahmet Mithat and Halit Ziya Uşaklıgil.

== Architecture ==
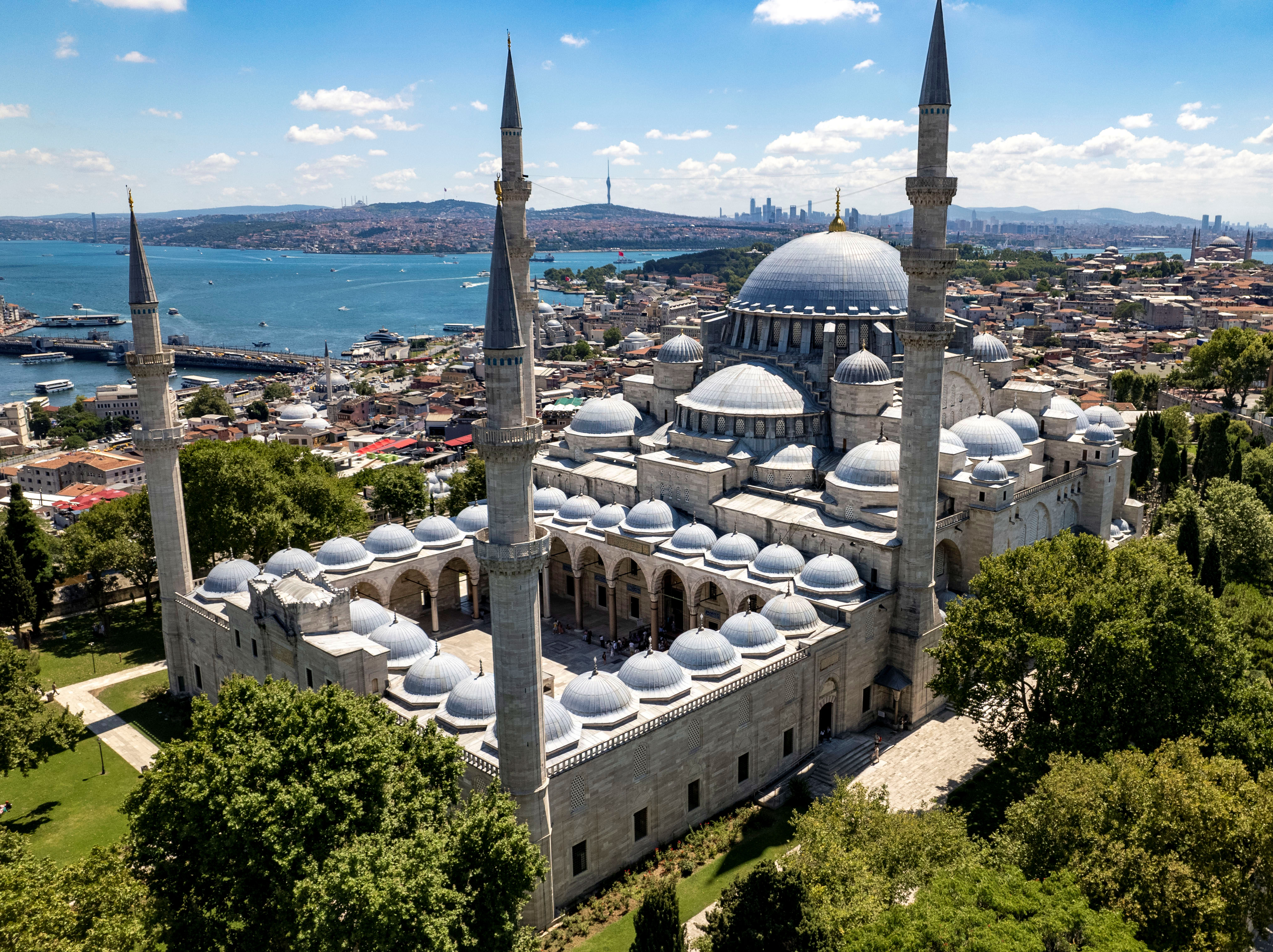
The Süleymaniye Mosque in Istanbul, built in the 1550s, is a major monument of the classical Ottoman style.

Ottoman architecture developed from earlier Seljuk Turkish architecture, with influences from Byzantine and Iranian architecture along with other architectural traditions in the Middle East. Major religious monuments were typically architectural complexes, known as a külliye, that had multiple components that could include a mosque, a madrasa, a hammam, an imaret, a sebil, a market, a caravanserai, a primary school, or others. Early Ottoman architecture experimented with multiple building types over the course of the 13th to 15th centuries, progressively evolving into the classical Ottoman style of the 16th and 17th centuries. The classical style mixed the Ottoman tradition with a stronger influence of the Hagia Sophia, resulting in monumental mosque buildings focused around a high central dome with a varying number of semi-domes. The most important architect of the classical period is Mimar Sinan, whose major works include the Şehzade Mosque, Süleymaniye Mosque, and Selimiye Mosque. The second half of the 16th century also saw the apogee of certain Ottoman decorative arts, most notably in the use of Iznik tiles.

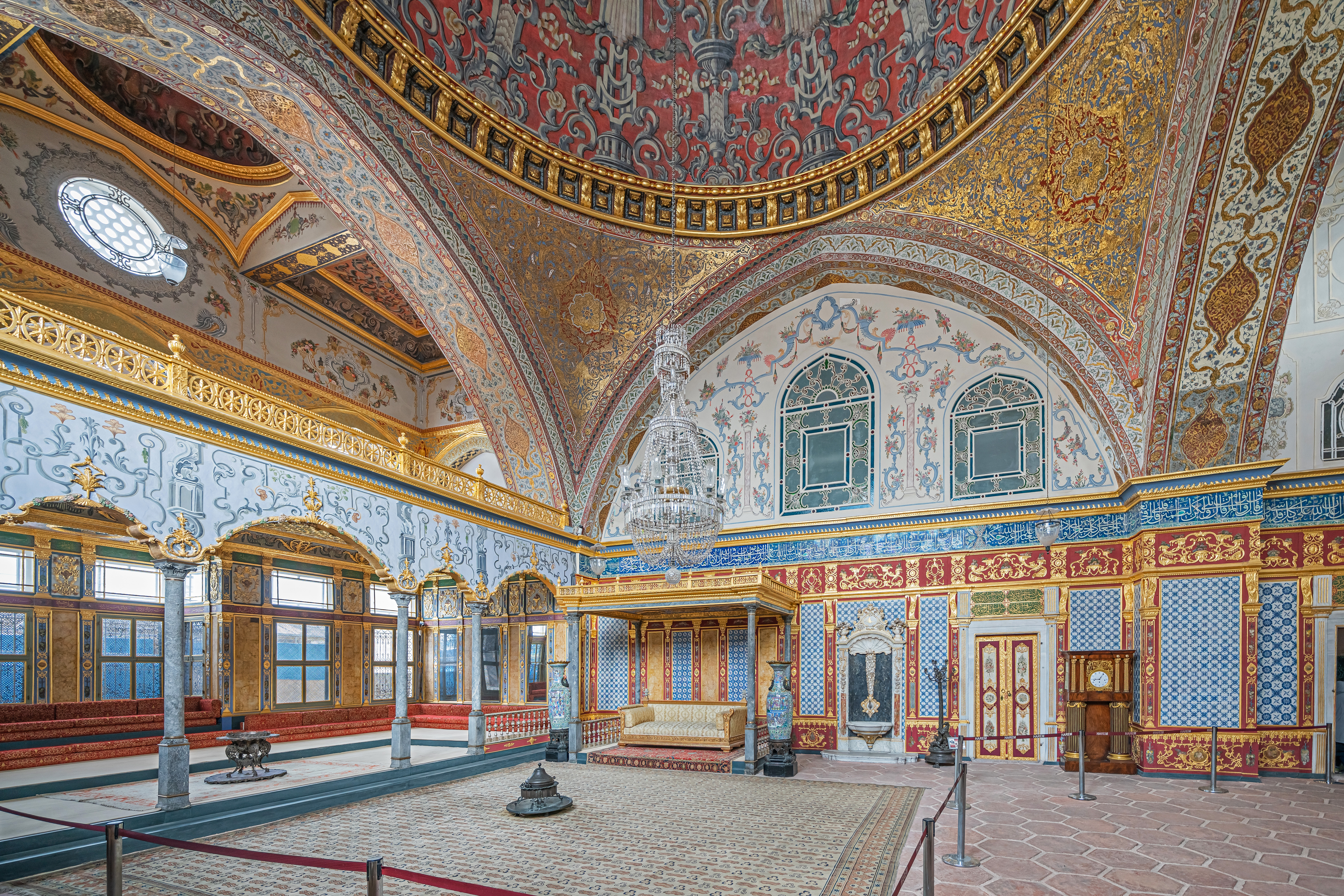
The Imperial Hall (Hünkâr Sofası) in Topkapı Palace, contains Ottoman decoration from the late 18th century as well as some restored decoration from the 16th century around the dome.

In the 18th century, Ottoman architecture became more open to external influences, including from Baroque architecture in Western Europe. Changes appeared during the style of the Tulip Period, which was followed by the emergence of the Ottoman Baroque style in the 1740s. The architecture of the 19th century saw more influences imported from Western Europe, brought in by architects such as those of the Balyan family. Empire style and Neoclassical motifs were introduced and a trend towards eclecticism was evident in many types of buildings. The last years of the Ottoman Empire saw the development of a new architectural style called neo-Ottoman or Ottoman revivalism, also known as the First National Architectural Movement.

== Decorative arts ==
=== Calligraphy ===
The stylized signature of Sultan Mahmud II of the Ottoman Empire was written in an expressive calligraphy. It reads Mahmud Khan son of Abdülhamid is forever victorious.

Calligraphy had a prestigious status under the Ottomans, its traditions having been shaped by the work of Abbasid calligrapher Yaqut al-Musta'simi of Baghdad, whose influence had spread across the Islamic world, al-Musta'simi himself possibly being of Anatolian origin.

The Diwani script is a cursive and distinctively Ottoman style of Arabic calligraphy developed in the 16th and early 17th centuries. It was invented by Housam Roumi, reaching its greatest development under Süleyman I the Magnificent (1520–66). The highly decorative script was distinguished by its complexity of line and by the close juxtaposition of the letters within words. Other forms included the flowing, rounded Nashki script, invented by the tenth-century Abbasid calligrapher Ali Muhammad ibn Muqlah, and Ta'liq, based on the Persian Nastalīq style.

Noted Ottoman calligraphers include Seyyid Kasim Gubari, Şeyh Hamdullah, Ahmed Karahisari, and Hâfiz Osman.

=== Miniatures ===
The Ottoman tradition of painting miniatures, to illustrate manuscripts or used in dedicated albums, was heavily influenced by the Persian art form, though it also included elements of the Byzantine tradition of illumination and painting. A Greek academy of painters, the Nakkashane-i-Rum was established in the Topkapi Palace in the 15th century, while early in the following century a similar Persian academy, the Nakkashane-i-Irani, was added.

We can establish approximatively the reign of Mehmed II (1451–81) as a moment of `birth´ of the production of the Ottoman miniatures with the first pieces having been found coming from this era. During that era many manuscripts show a desire in the court to establish a painting studio in the recently annexed capital of the empire Istanbul. This project seems to have succeeded in the 1480s, while we have clear proof of its existence and of the opening of new studios in other cities around 1825.

=== Carpet-weaving and textile arts ===
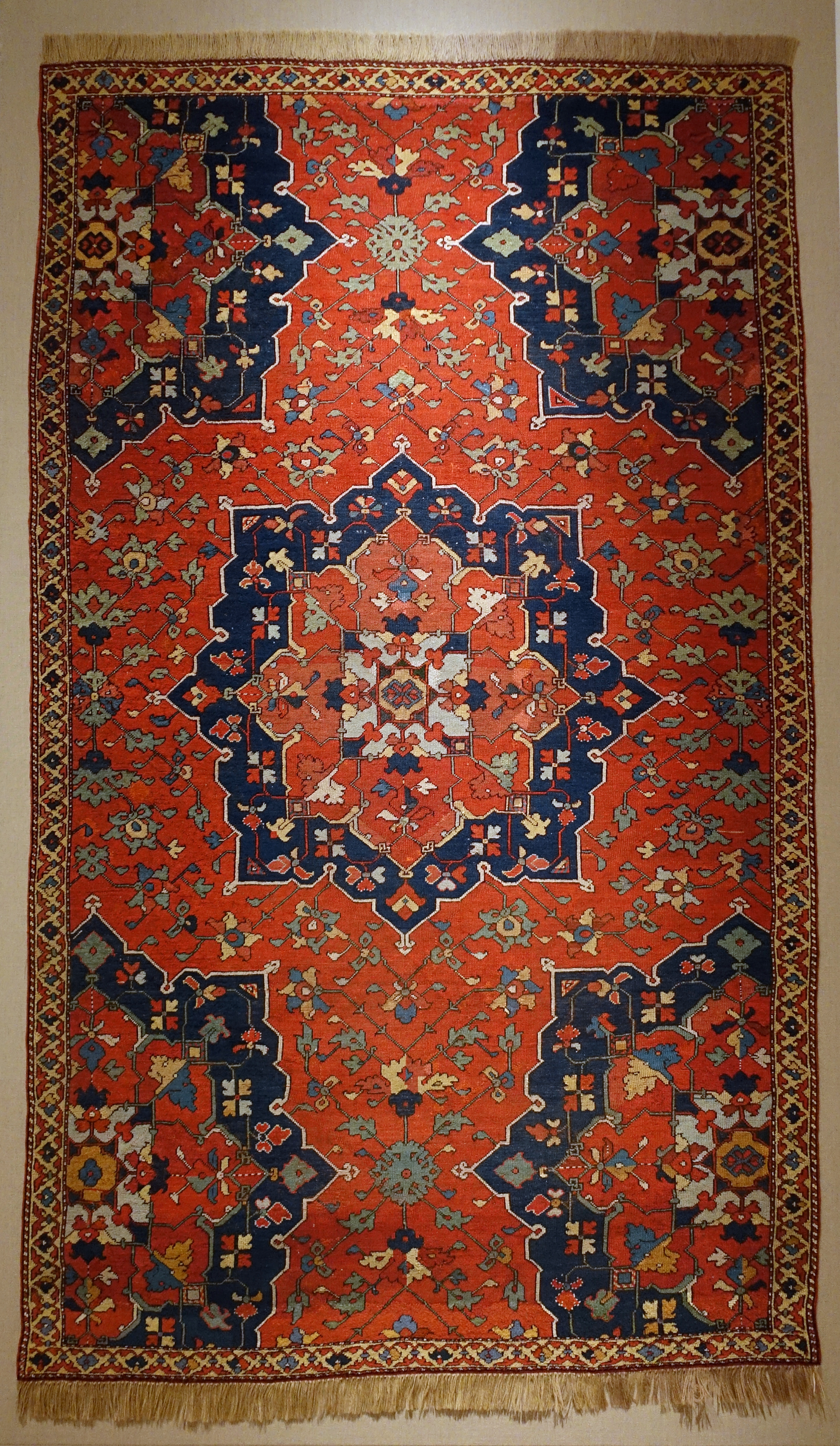
16th-century wool carpet from Ushak, Turkey

The art of carpet weaving was particularly significant in the Ottoman Empire, carpets having an immense importance both as decorative furnishings, rich in religious and other symbolism, and as a practical consideration, as it was customary to remove one's shoes in living quarters. The weaving of such carpets originated in the nomadic cultures of central Asia (carpets being an easily transportable form of furnishing), and was eventually spread to the settled societies of Anatolia. Turks used carpets, rugs and patterned kilims not just on the floors of a room, but also as a hanging on walls and doorways, where they provided additional insulation. They were also commonly donated to mosques, which often amassed large collections of them.

Hereke carpets were of particularly high status, being made of silk or a combination of silk and cotton, and intricately knotted. Other significant designs included "Palace", "Yörük", Ushak, and Milas or "Türkmen" carpets. "Yörük" and "Türkmen" represented more stylized designs, whereas naturalistic designs were prevalent in "Palace".

=== Jewelry ===
The Ottoman Empire was noted for the quality of its gold- and silversmiths, and particularly for the jewelry they produced. Jewelry had particular importance as it was commonly given at weddings, as a gift that could be used as a form of savings. Silver was the most common material used, with gold reserved for more high-status pieces; designs often displayed complex filigree work and incorporated Persian and Byzantine motifs. Developments in design reflected the tastes of the Ottoman court, with Persian Safavid art, for example, becoming an influence after the Ottoman defeat of Ismail I after the Battle of Chaldiran in 1514. In the rural areas of the Empire, jewelry was simpler and often incorporated gold coins (the Ottoman altin), but the designs of Constantinople nevertheless spread throughout Ottoman territory and were reflected even in the metalwork of Egypt and North Africa.

Most jewelers and goldsmiths were Christian Armenians and Jews, but the interest of the Ottomans in the related art of watchmaking resulted in many European goldsmiths, watchmakers and gem engravers moving to Constantinople, where they worked in the foreigners' quarter, Galata.

== Performance ==
=== Music ===
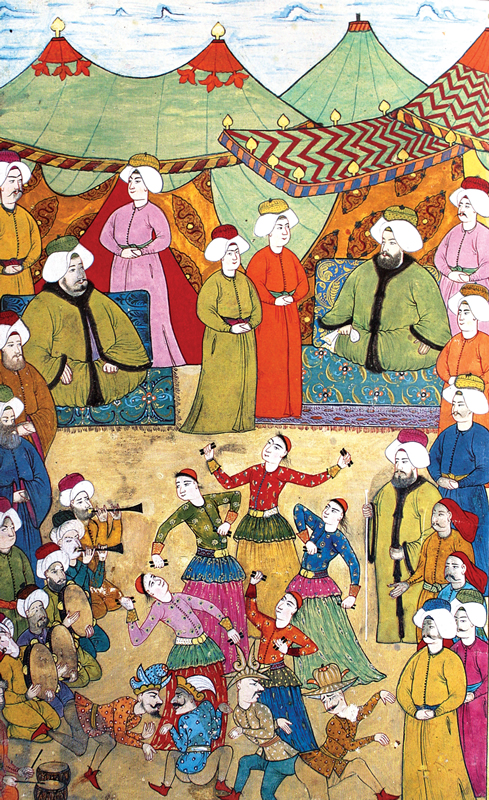
Musicians and dancers entertain the crowds, from Surname-i Hümayun, 1720.

Music in the Ottoman Empire was a rich and diverse tradition that synthesized various Central Asian, Middle Eastern, and Balkan influences over six centuries. The royal court in Constantinople (Istanbul) served as the central hub for the development of Ottoman classical music, which utilized a sophisticated modal system known as makam (a set of rules and melodic patterns for composition and improvisation) and a specific rhythmic system called usul. This tradition was preserved and taught in palace schools (Enderûn), which trained both musicians for court ceremonies and members of the military. A parallel, highly influential tradition was the military music of the Janissary bands (Mehter), which employed loud wind instruments (like the zurna and boru) and percussion, inspiring European military bands. In the 19th century, the court officially shifted its patronage to Western classical music and opera during the Tanzimat reforms, leading to a decline in traditional court music, though it continued to flourish in private circles and various regional folk traditions across the empire's vast territories.

=== Dance ===
Dancing was an important element of Ottoman culture, which incorporated the folkloric dancing traditions of many different countries and lands on three continents; from the Balkan peninsula and the Black Sea regions to the Caucasus, the Middle East and North Africa.

Dancing was also one of the most popular pastimes in the Imperial Harem of Topkapı Palace.

The female belly dancers, named Çengi, were mostly from the Roma community. Today, living in Istanbul's Roma neighbourhoods like Sulukule, Kuştepe, Cennet and Kasımpaşa, they still dominate the traditional belly dancing and musical entertainment shows throughout the city's traditional taverns.

There were also male dancers, named Köçek, who took part in the entertainment shows and celebrations, accompanied by circus acrobats, named Cambaz, performing difficult tricks, and other shows which attracted curiosity.

=== Meddah ===
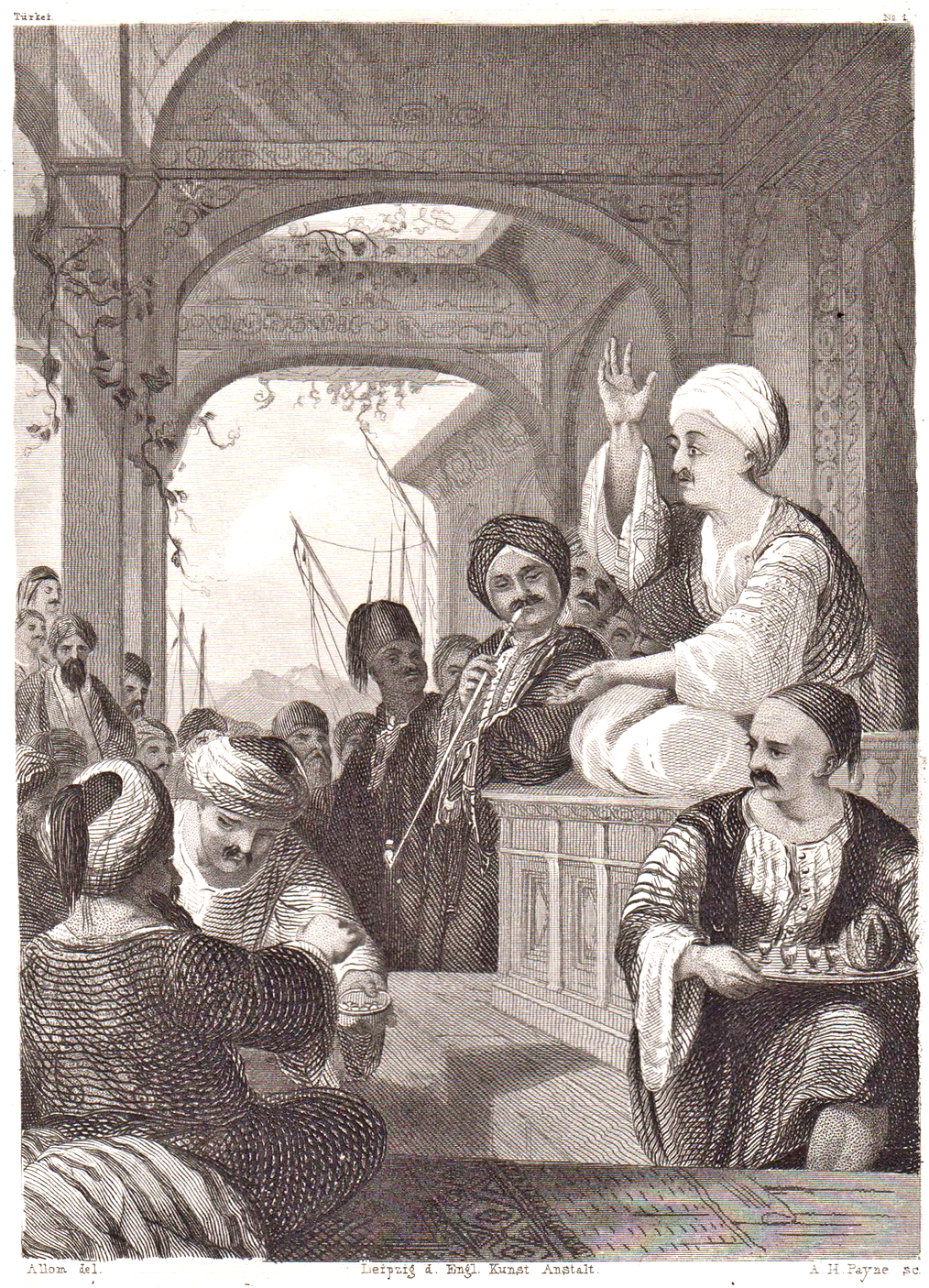
Meddah performing at a coffeehouse

The meddah or story teller played in front of a small group of viewers, such as a coffeehouse audience. The play was generally about a single topic, the meddah playing different characters, and was usually introduced by drawing attention to the moral contained in the story. The meddah would use props such as an umbrella, a handkerchief, or different headwear, to signal a change of character, and was skilled at manipulating his voice and imitating different dialects. There was no time limitation on the shows; a good meddah had the skill to adjust the story depending on interaction with the audience.

Meddahs were generally traveling artists whose route took them from one large city to another, such along the towns of the spice road; the tradition supposedly goes back to Homer's time. The methods of meddahs were the same as the methods of the itinerant storytellers who related Greek epics such as the Iliad and Odyssey, even though the main stories were now Ferhat ile Şirin or Layla and Majnun. The repertoires of the meddahs also included true stories, modified depending on the audience, artist and political situation.

The Istanbul meddahs were known to integrate musical instruments into their stories: this was a main difference between them and the East Anatolian Dengbejin.

In 2008 the art of the meddahs was relisted in the Representative List of the Intangible Cultural Heritage of Humanity.

=== Karagöz shadow play ===
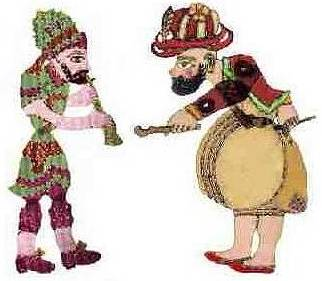
Shadow Play: Hacivat (left) and Karagöz (right)

The Turkish shadow theatre, also known as Karagöz ("Black-Eyed") after one of its main characters, is descended from the Oriental Shadow theatre. According to Georg Jacob the certain date of Karagöz and Hacivat shadow play is unknown. However, the shadow play itself was invented in China and Central Asia then transferred into Turkish tradition. The other theory is that the tradition of shadow play was introduced to Ottoman Empire from Egypt. And it is known that Egypt got this tradition from the Island of Java with the interaction through Arab merchants starting from 7th to 10th centuries.

==== Sections of play and characters ====
Karagöz shadow play (gölge oyunu) consists of four parts: Giriş (Introduction); Muhavere (Conversation); Fasıl; Bitiş (Ending).

In Introduction part, Hacivat enters the stage with the sound of Nareke – a tool that sounds like a buzzing of a bee, and starts reading poems which is an invitation for Karagöz to come to the stage.

In terms of characters, Karagöz and Hacivat was a reflection of Ottoman society. The cosmopolite structure of the Empire – especially of Istanbul, was shown to the audience. Here is the list of some characters of the shadow play:

- Main Characters: Karagöz and Hacivat
- Women: Zenne
- Characters from Istanbul: Çelebi, Tiryaki, Beberuhi and Matiz
- Provincial Characters: Laz, Kürd, Kayserili, Kastamonulu, Eğinli
- Muslim Characters outside of Anatolia: Muhacir (Turkish Balkan immigrant), Arab, Fars, Arnavut (Albanian)
- Non-Muslim Characters: Rum (Greek), Frank (European), Ermeni (Armenian), Yahudi (Jew)
- Bullies and Drunks: Efe, Zeybek, Matiz, Külhanbeyi, Sarhoş (Drunk)
- Characters who has mental or physical setbacks: Hımhım, the Stutterer, the Madman, the Cannabis addict, Denyo
- Entertainers: Male Köçek Dancer, Female Çengi Dancer, Singer, Magician, Acrobat, Musician, Illusionist, Reveller
- Supernatural Characters: Wizard, Cadılar (Witches), Djins and Demons,

=== Orta Oyunu or Medyan ===
The Orta Oyunu is an open stage theatric play that consists of two main characters "Kavuklu" and "Pişekar". The play is based on discourse, two main characters of Orta Oyunu tell jokes from one to another to create an environment of humour, similar to Karagöz and Hacivat. However, Medyan's way of playing is more flexible compared to Karagöz and Hacivat.

The first mention of the name Orta Oyunu is in 1834 in the wedding ceremony inscription of Saliha Sultan in those lines of poetry:

Cümle etraf-nişin-i meydan oldu / Oldu orta oyunundan handan

Medyan took its final form in the start of the 19th century. Seljuk plays that are based on performing imitation and personification were common. However, with the combination of raks (dance), musiki (music), muhavere (discourse), and histrionics the play of Orta Oyunu took its final shape. Other influential plays such as Karagöz and Hacivat, Kukla (puppet play), dans (dance), meddah (encomiastics) and prestidigitation were also significant in the shaping of Medyan, it is because those plays were also based on personification.

The forming elements of Orta Oyunu are the music, different forms of dances and wizardries of the different regions within the Ottoman Empire. Alongside these, cultural way of mocking, mimicking and discourses also have a part to play in Orta Oyunu.

==== Stage and characters ====
Median theatre

The play took place in an open area where people gathered around the field. Orta Oyunu is unique as it lacks a specific plot, emphasizing improvisation. Music, particularly folk songs and poems, plays a significant role in the performance. Alongside Kavuklu and Pişekar, there are supporting characters such as Curcunabazlar, Çengiler (women dancers), and Köçekler (young men dancers imitating women dancers). Other characters represented various stereotypes from different Ottoman millets, including Arabs, Armenians, Albanians, Kurds, Laz people, and Jews. The performance area was known as the "Meydan" (Square), and there was another space called the "Yeni Dünya" (New World) where men and women audience members observed the play. The men's section was referred to as "mevki" (position), while the women's section was called the "kafes" (cage). İsmail Dümbüllü, who died in 1973, was the last notable figure associated with Orta Oyunu.

== Sports ==
The Tanzimat period was particularly important in terms of the development of sports and gymnastics in the Ottoman Empire. As other fields like education, the influence of France is the most visible one. It is known that in Mekteb-i Harbiye (Staff Officer Academy), activities of gymnastics were added on the curriculum in 1863 which makes it the first mandatory modern sports lesson of the Empire – Riyazat-ı Bedeniye.

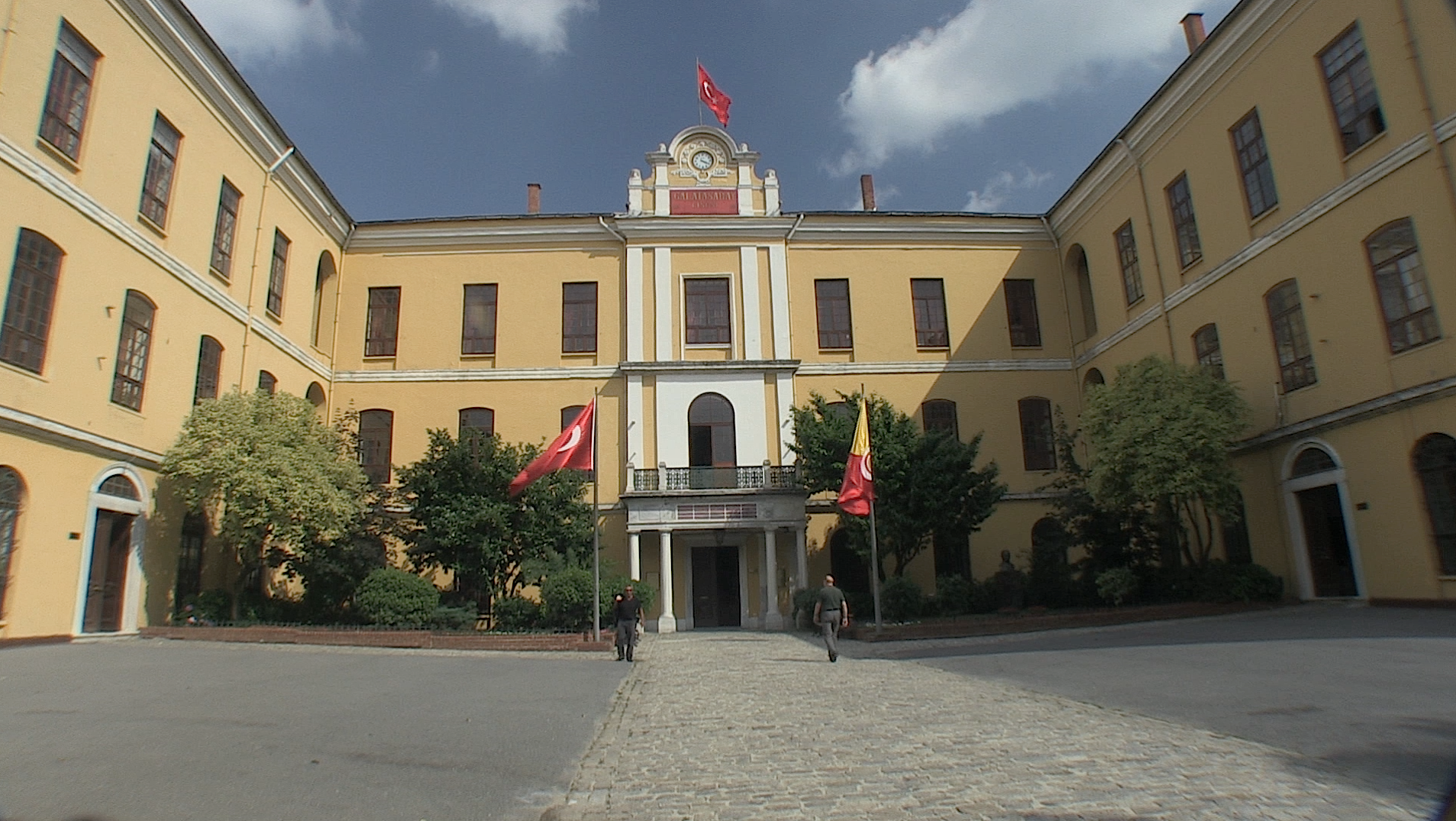
Mekteb-i Sultani (Galatasaray Lisesi – Galatasaray High School)

Other schools like Mekteb-i Sultani (Galatasaray Lisesi – Galatasaray High School) and Robert College were the pioneers of the Ottoman Empire in gymnastics. Galatasaray High School was the school of Faik Üstünidman who will later be known as "Şeyhü’l-İdman" because of his leadership in educating gymnastics students. Selim Sırrı Tarcan was also one of the pioneers of sports of the Ottoman Empire, he was the first person who put forward the ideal of competing in the olympic games.

Sultan Abdülaziz after his visits to Europe, ordered the translation of gymnastics books which will be used as school books in the Ottoman Empire. In 1869 Rüştiyeler (Junior High Schools), in 1870 Mekteb-i Tıbbiye (Ottoman Medical School), in 1887 İdadiler (High Schools) were now having gymnastics and fencing classes in their syllabuses.

Sports clubs

The Jewish Gymnastics Club of Constantinople, founded in 1895, was the first of Istanbul's sports clubs, soon followed by Kurtuluş Sports Club founded in 1896 by Ottoman Greeks. The opening of these athletic clubs symbolized a general growth in sports and sports culture in Istanbul at the time. In the coming years, Beşiktaş Gymnastics Club, the Galatasaray Sports Club, and the Fenerbahçe Sports Club — Istanbul's "big three" — were founded. Exercise, as well as football and gymnastics were commonplace among the primarily affluent members of these clubs. In contrast to the fairly exclusive "big three", Vefa Sports Club, established after the progressive Young Turk revolution in 1908, served as an amateur sports and football club of the people.

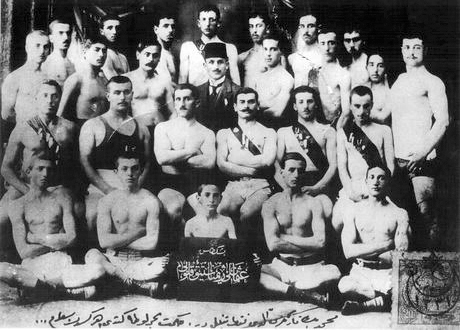
Members of Beşiktaş J.K. in 1903

The turn of the twentieth century saw clubs spring up throughout Istanbul to appeal to many niches of young men, whether Muslim, Christian, or Jewish. Almost all athletic clubs were ethnically and religiously homogeneous, however they all shared a focus on physicality. Furthermore, the function of these institutions expanded beyond sports, as they taught young men proper hygiene, dress, and posture, in addition to serving as environments for male discourse and socializing.

The development of athletic clubs enabled the rise of team sports in Istanbul — principally football — serving as contrasts to the more traditional Ottoman sports of oil wrestling and archery. For instance, upon its opening in 1905, Galatasaray functioned exclusively as a football club. This shift toward team competition represented a general modernization of sports in Istanbul, a modernization that can also be seen, for example, in the Beşiktaş Gymnastics Club as traditional Turkish wrestling embraced new mat technology.

Athletic clubs revolutionized sports reporting in the Ottoman Empire, as publications began to cover club games. Futbol, written in Ottoman Turkish and initially released in 1910, served as Istanbul's first sports magazine, principally following club football matches.

Growth in sports related readership coincided with a growing sports spectating culture in Istanbul. 1905 saw the creation of the Constantinople Association Football League, which organized soccer matches among athletic clubs, while also providing entertainment for thousands of spectators. Completed in 1909, with the blessing of Sultan Abdülhamid II, the Union Club provided the first reliable stadium in which thousands of Istanbul spectators could gather to watch sports. Contrary to the strict homosocial exclusivity of many clubs, the Union Club allowed women to spectate athletic competitions. With this rise in spectatorship, Galatasaray and Fenerbahçe in particular, became recognized as the city's preeminent clubs. While heavily connected to football, the Union Club hosted a plethora events organized by a variety of Istanbul athletic clubs, including races, gymnastics, and more. For example, in 1911, the Union Club was the site of the first Armenian Olympics.

In the past century, many of these clubs have only continued to gain popularity. Now under the Republic of Turkey, the Süper Lig represents the region's most popular football league, and Galatasaray and Fenerbahçe are the league's most popular teams.

== Ottoman cuisine ==
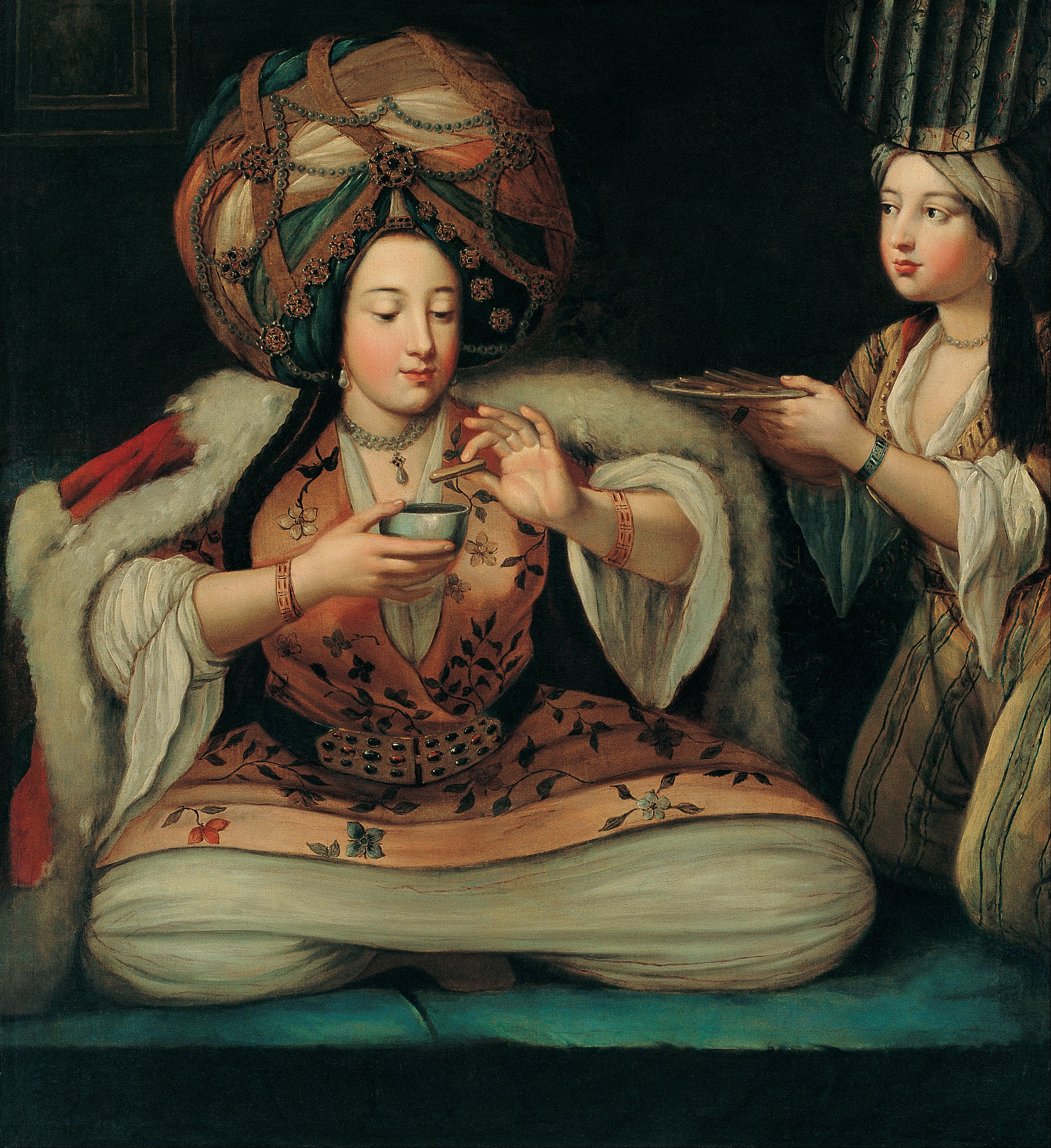
Coffee delight at the Harem, early 18th century

The cuisine of Ottoman Turkey can be divided between that of the Ottoman court itself, which was a highly sophisticated and elaborate fusion of many of the culinary traditions found in the Empire, its predecessors (notably the Byzantine Empire), and the regional cuisines of the peasantry and of the Empire's minorities, which were influenced by the produce of their respective areas. Rice, for example, was a staple of high-status cookery (Imperial cooks were hired according to the skill they displayed in cooking it) but would have been regarded as a luxury item through most of Anatolia, where bread was the staple grain food.

=== Drinks ===
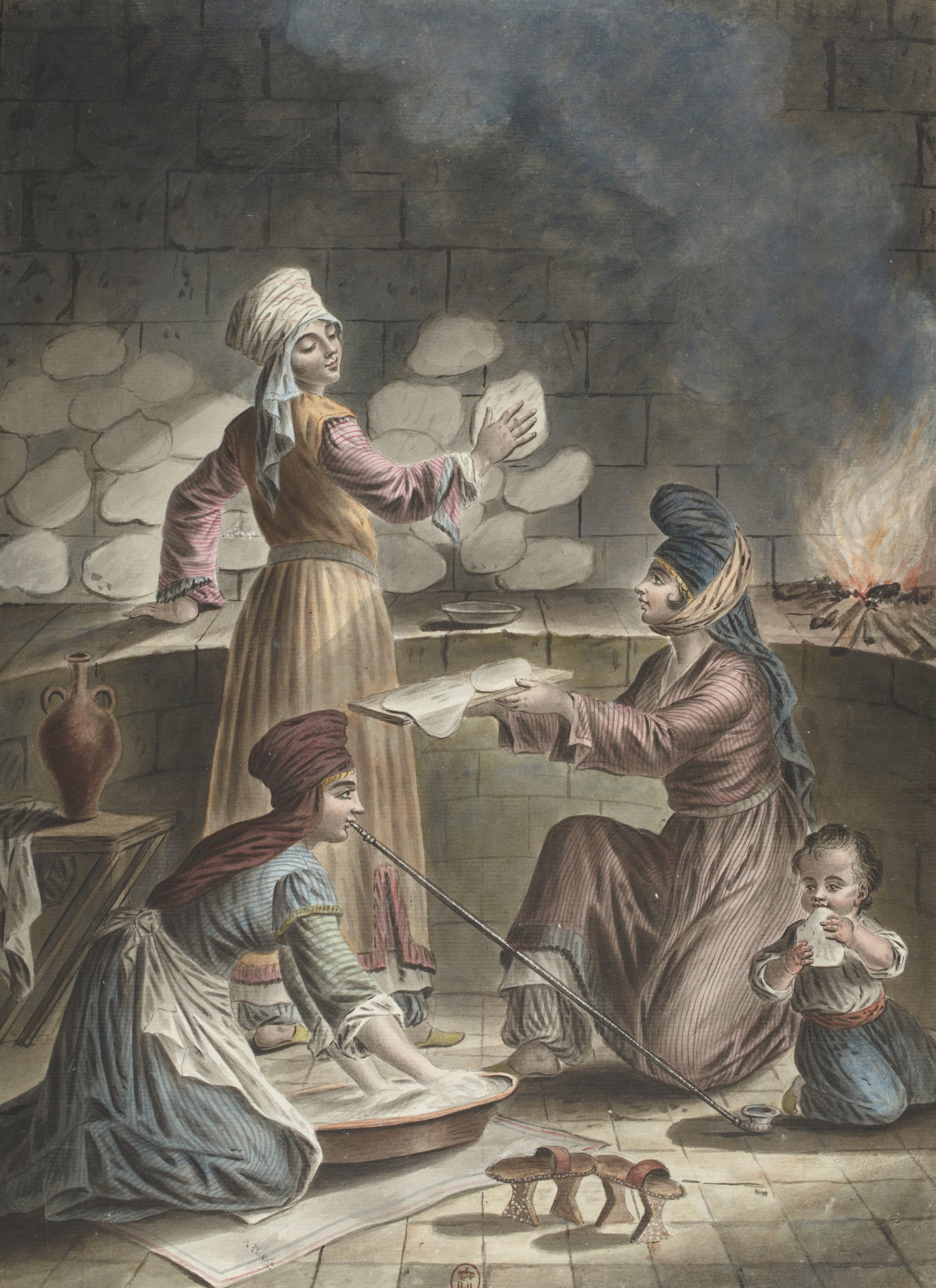
Turkish women baking bread, 1790

- Ayran – a traditional yogurt drink still popular throughout many areas of the former Empire.
- Boza – a traditional fermented cereal drink, usually made from millet, with a thick consistency and a slightly sour-sweet taste.
- Rakı – a traditional Turkish alcoholic beverage.
- Sherbet – a spiced cold fruit drink.
- Turkish coffee – Turkish coffee is a style of coffee prepared in a cezve using very finely ground coffee beans without filtering or settling to remove the grounds. – often accompanied with a Nargile (Narguile / Hookah).

=== Food ===
- Baklava
- Börek
- Çörek
- Döner
- Kaymak
- Kebab
- Keşkek
- Lahmacun
- Lokum (Turkish delight)
- Macun
- Pastırma
- Patlican ezmesi
- Pestil
- Pilav
- Pogaça
- Shish Kebab
- Şeker (Candies)
  - Akide Şekeri
- Sucuk
- Stuffed leaves
- Stuffed squash
- Tarhana

== Coffeehouses ==
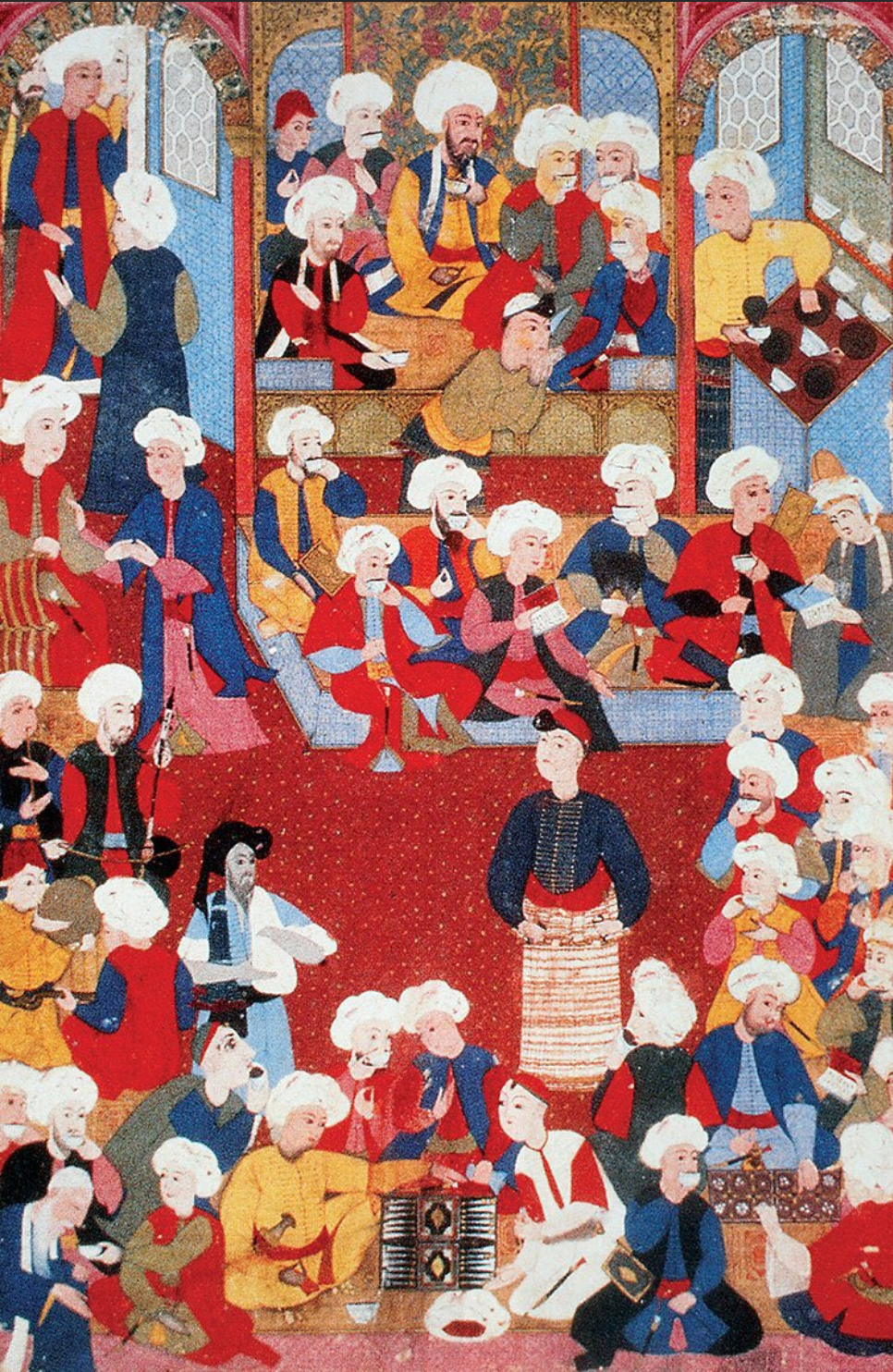
Ottoman miniature of a meddah performing at a coffeehouse

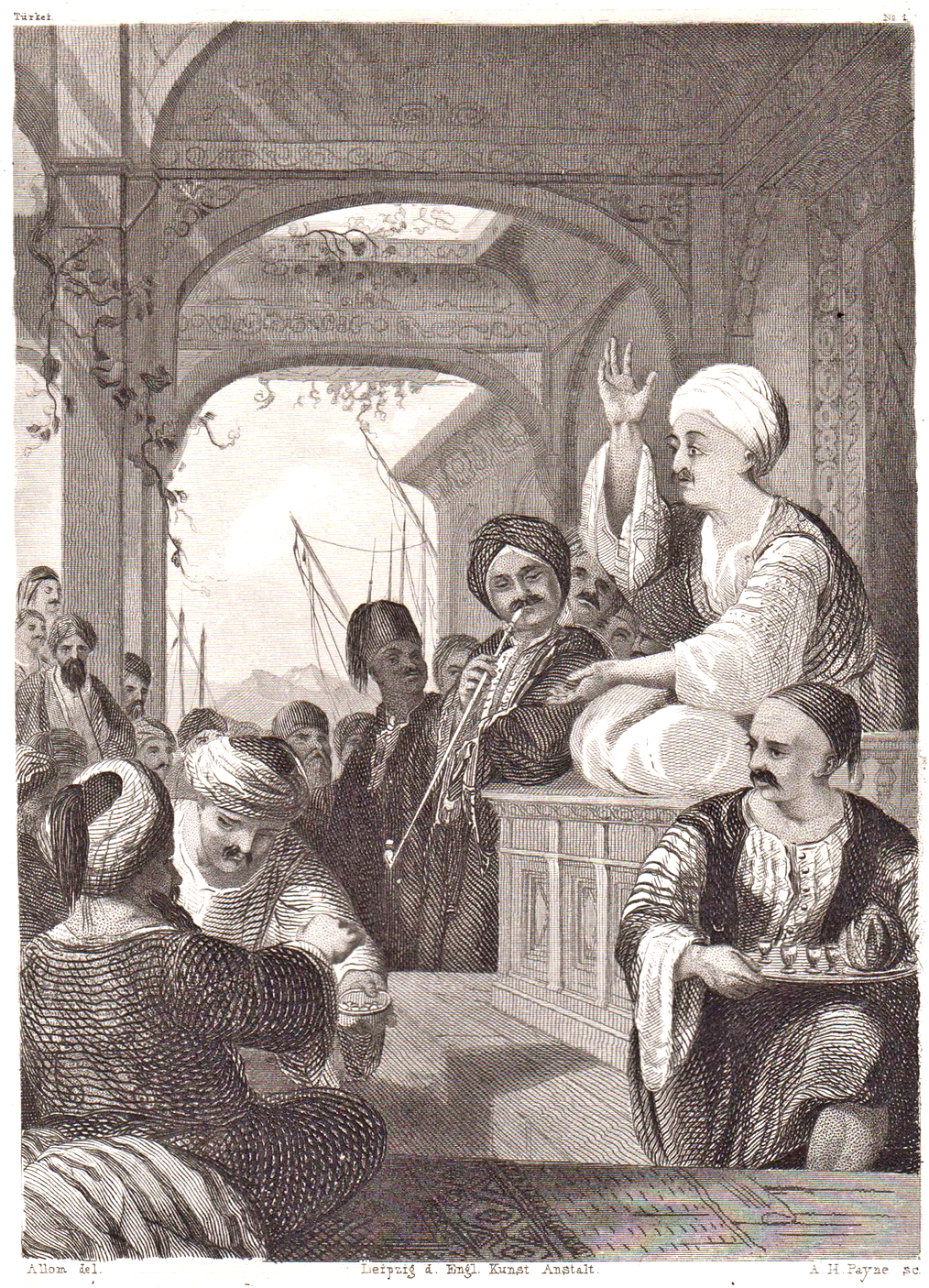
Storyteller (meddah) at a coffeehouse in the Ottoman Empire. The first coffeehouses appeared in the Muslim world in the 15th century.

The first coffeehouses appeared in Damascus. These coffeehouses also made their way to Mecca, in the Arabian Peninsula in the 15th century, then spread to the Ottoman Empire's capital of Istanbul, when two Arab merchants, Hakem of Aleppo and Shems of Damascus, opened the first coffeehouse in the Tahtakale district in the 16th century and to Baghdad.

Coffeehouses became popular meeting places where people gathered to drink coffee, have conversations, play board games such as chess and backgammon, listen to stories and music, and discuss news and politics. They became known as "schools of wisdom" for the type of clientele they attracted, and their free and frank discourse.

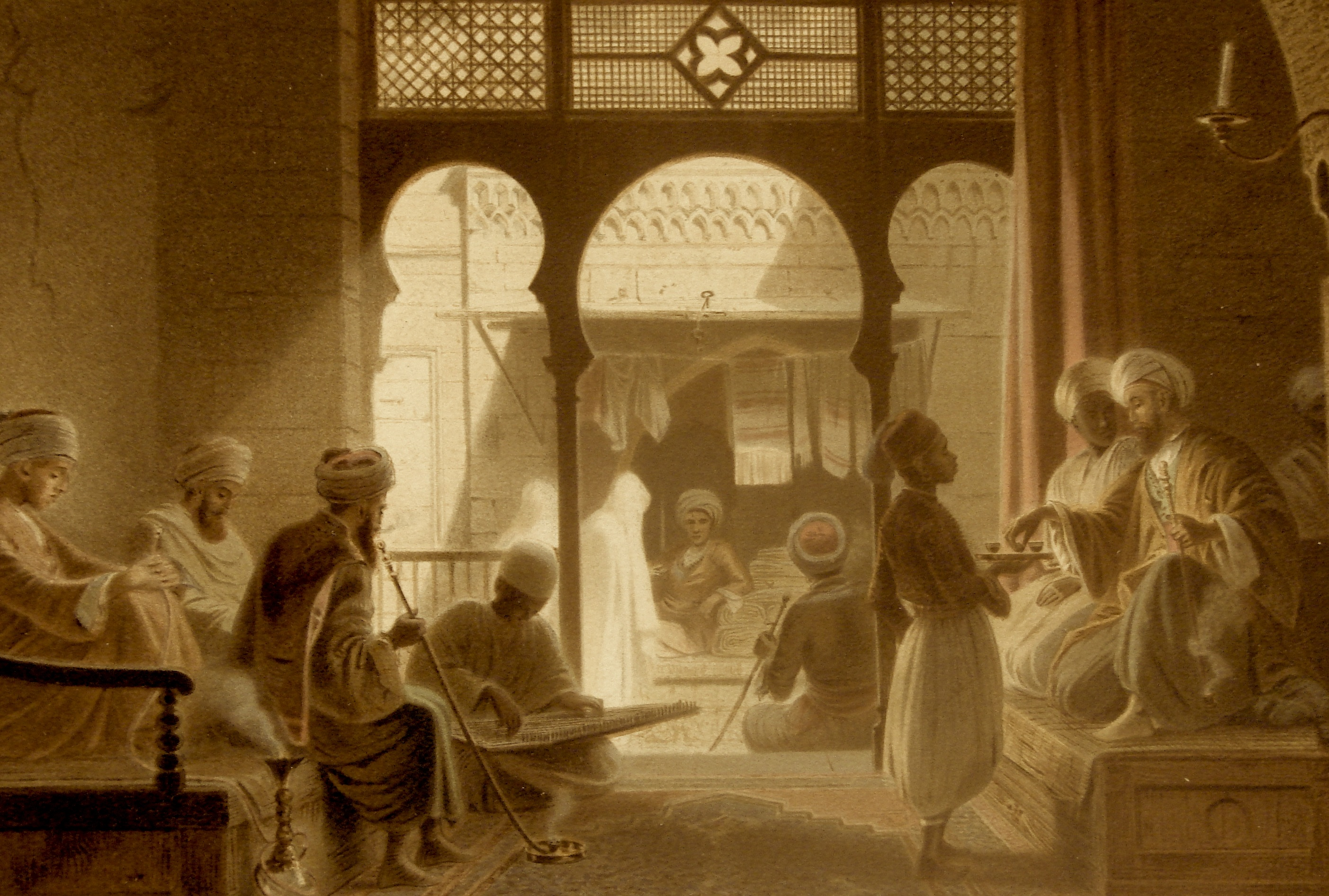
A coffeehouse in Cairo, 18th century

Coffeehouses in Mecca became a concern of imams, who viewed them as places for political gatherings and drinking, leading to bans between 1512 and 1524. However, these bans could not be maintained, as coffee became ingrained in daily ritual and culture among Arabs and neighboring peoples. The Ottoman chronicler İbrahim Peçevi reports in his writings (1642–49) about the opening of the first coffeehouse (kiva han) in Constantinople:

Until the year 962 [1555], in the High, God-Guarded city of Constantinople, as well as in Ottoman lands generally, coffee and coffeehouses did not exist. About that year, a fellow called Hakam from Aleppo and a wag called Shams from Damascus came to the city; they each opened a large shop in the district called Tahtakale, and began to purvey coffee.

A coffeehouse (Turkish: kahvehane; Hungarian: kávéház; Serbian: кафана, romanized: kafana) was opened in Nándorfehérvár (present-day Belgrade, Serbia) in 1521, shortly after the city fell to the Ottomans. A coffeehouse opposite the Büyük Müezzin Sinan Pasha Mosque (today the Matthias Church) in Buda was recorded in 1578. A coffeehouse was opened in Sarajevo, Bosnia and Herzegovina around 1532, in a busy area called Bentbaša. In 1651, Evliya Çelebi travelled through Bulgaria and the Dobruja region (into present-day Romania). He noted a large coffeehouse in Silastra, seven coffeehouses in Mangalia, eight coffeehouses in Babadag and two coffeehouses in Karasu. In 1670, Çelebi recorded seven coffeehouses in Elbasan, Albania. Prominent political, economic and cultural figures of Elbasan are reported to have frequented these coffeehouses. The earliest known Hungarian reference to a Serbian-established coffeehouse in Hungary dates back to 1696 in Szentendre. The first known Serbian-established coffeehouse in Pest dates back to 1714 (Balázs Kávéfőző). Notes of the Pest City Council from 1729 mention complaints by the Balázs coffeehouse and Franz Reschfellner café against the Italian-originated café of Francesco Bellieno for selling underpriced coffee.

== Gallery ==
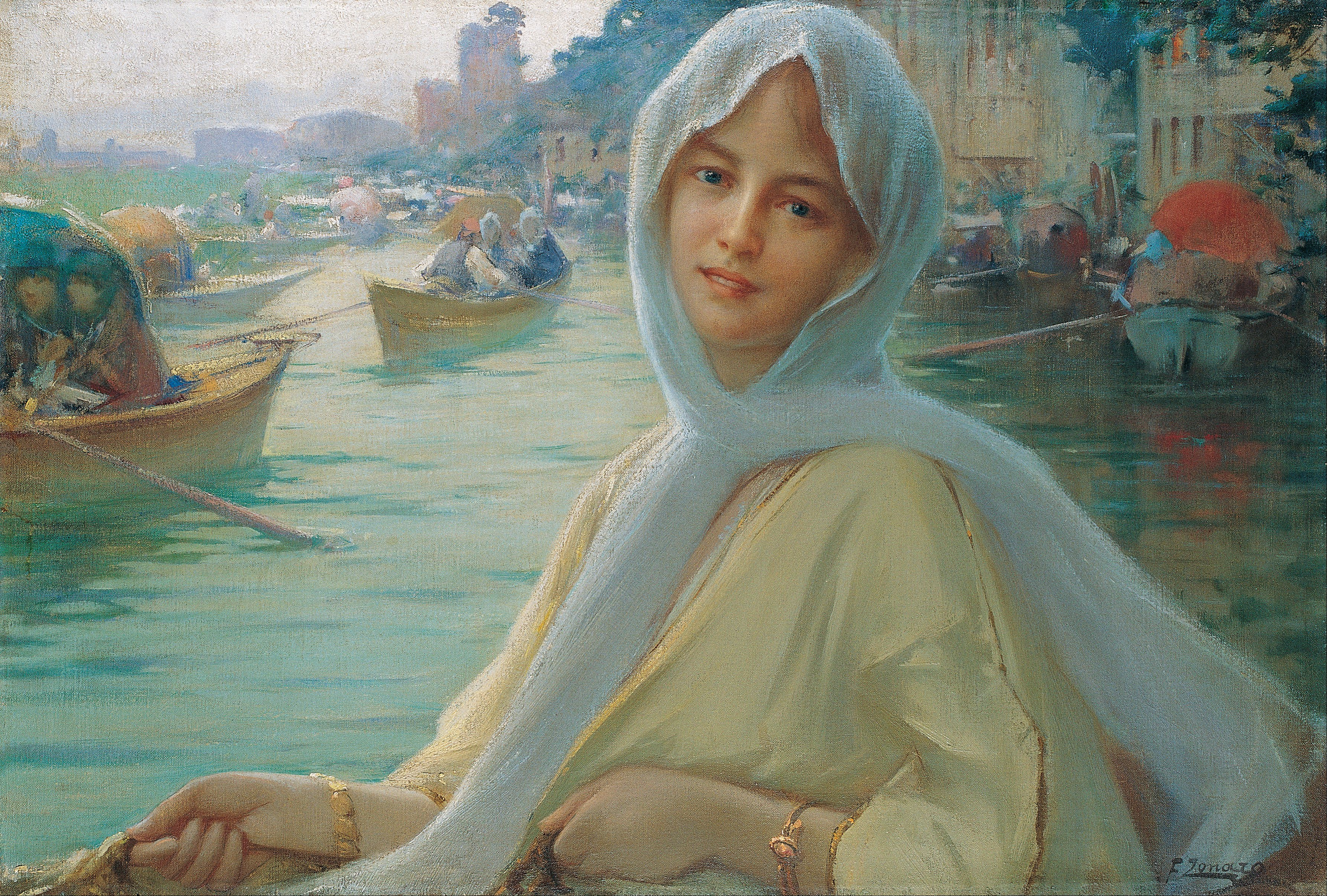
Boat tour at Göksu Creek

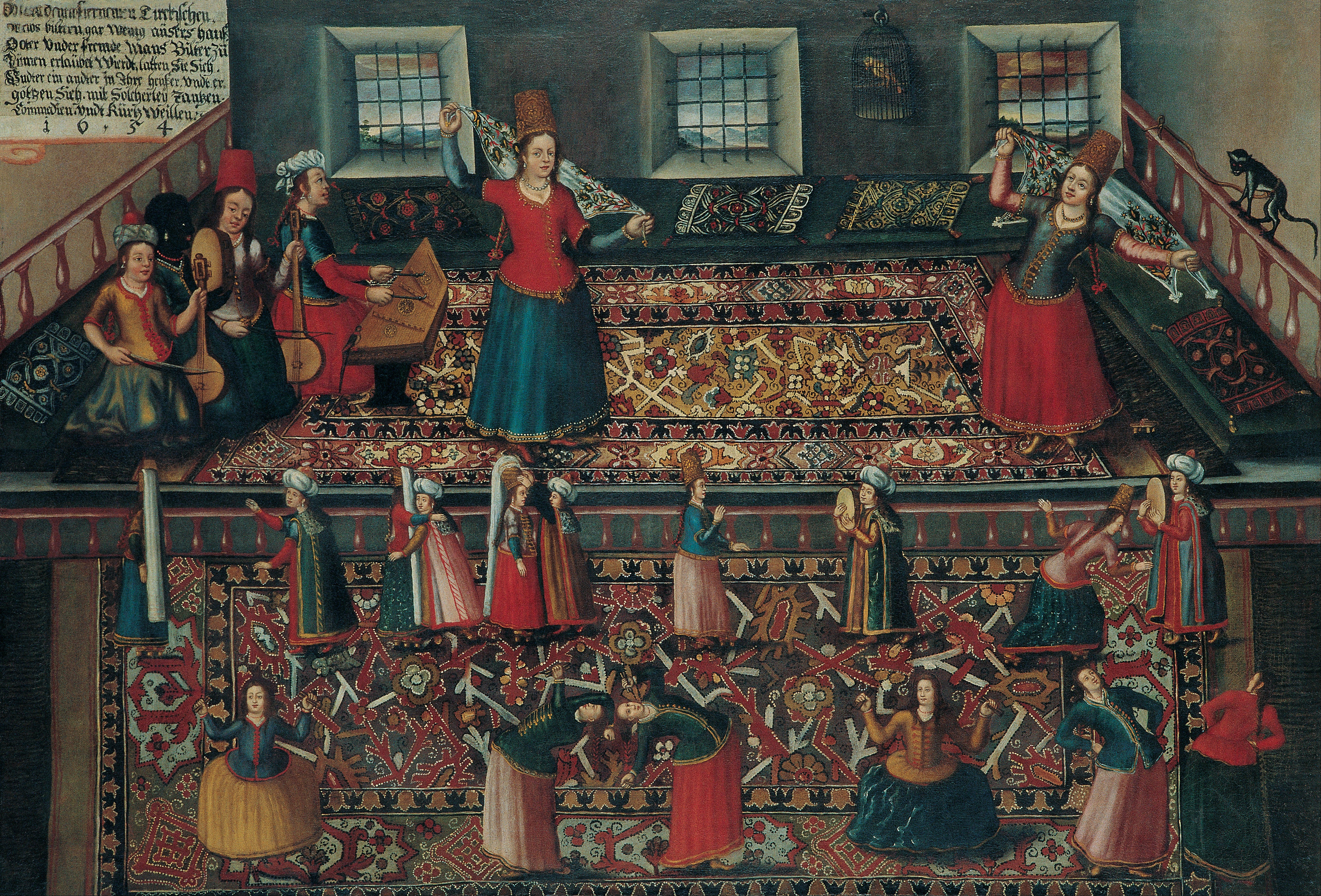
Women and children dancing in the Imperial Harem of Topkapı Palace

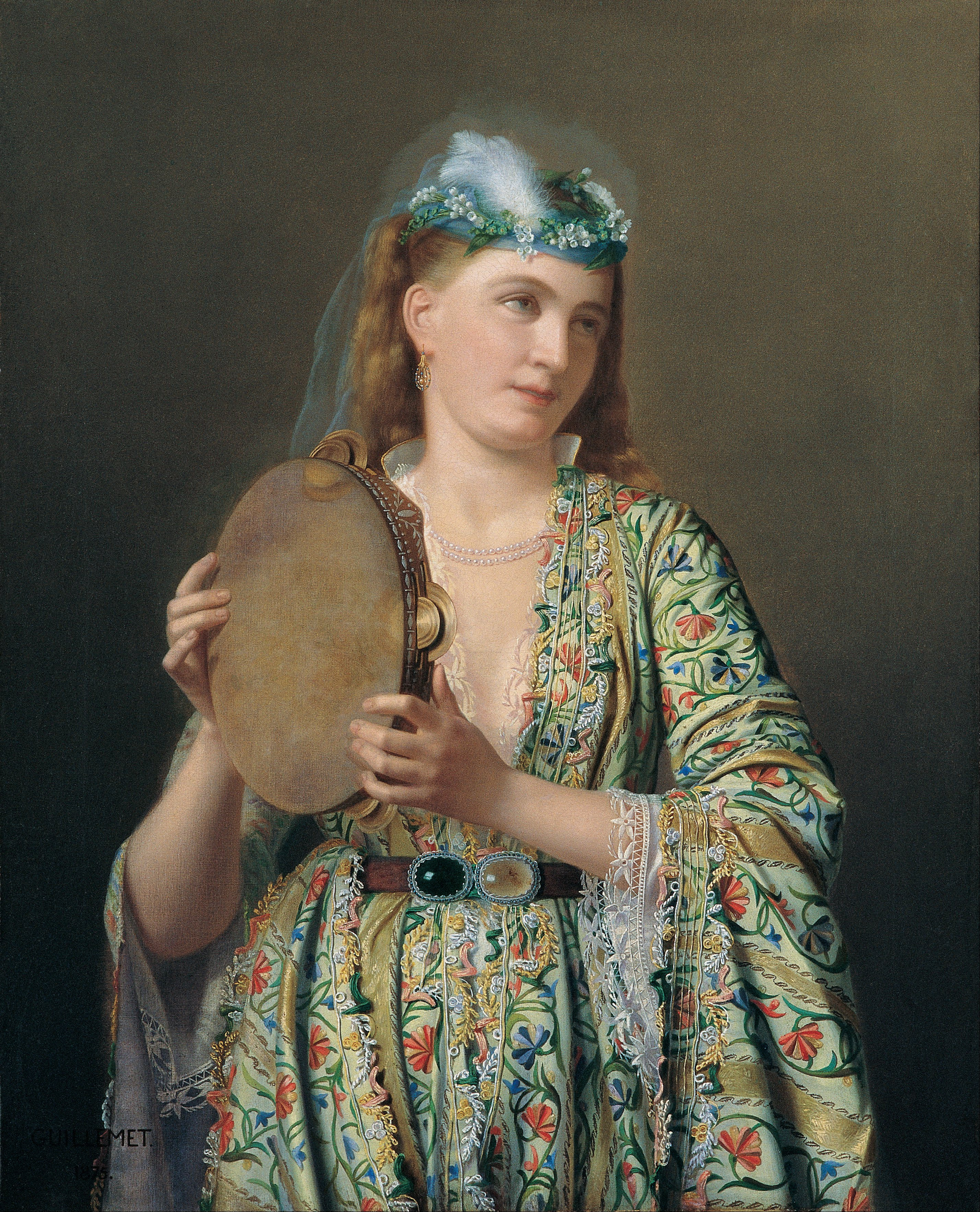
A lady from the Ottoman court playing the Def at the Harem

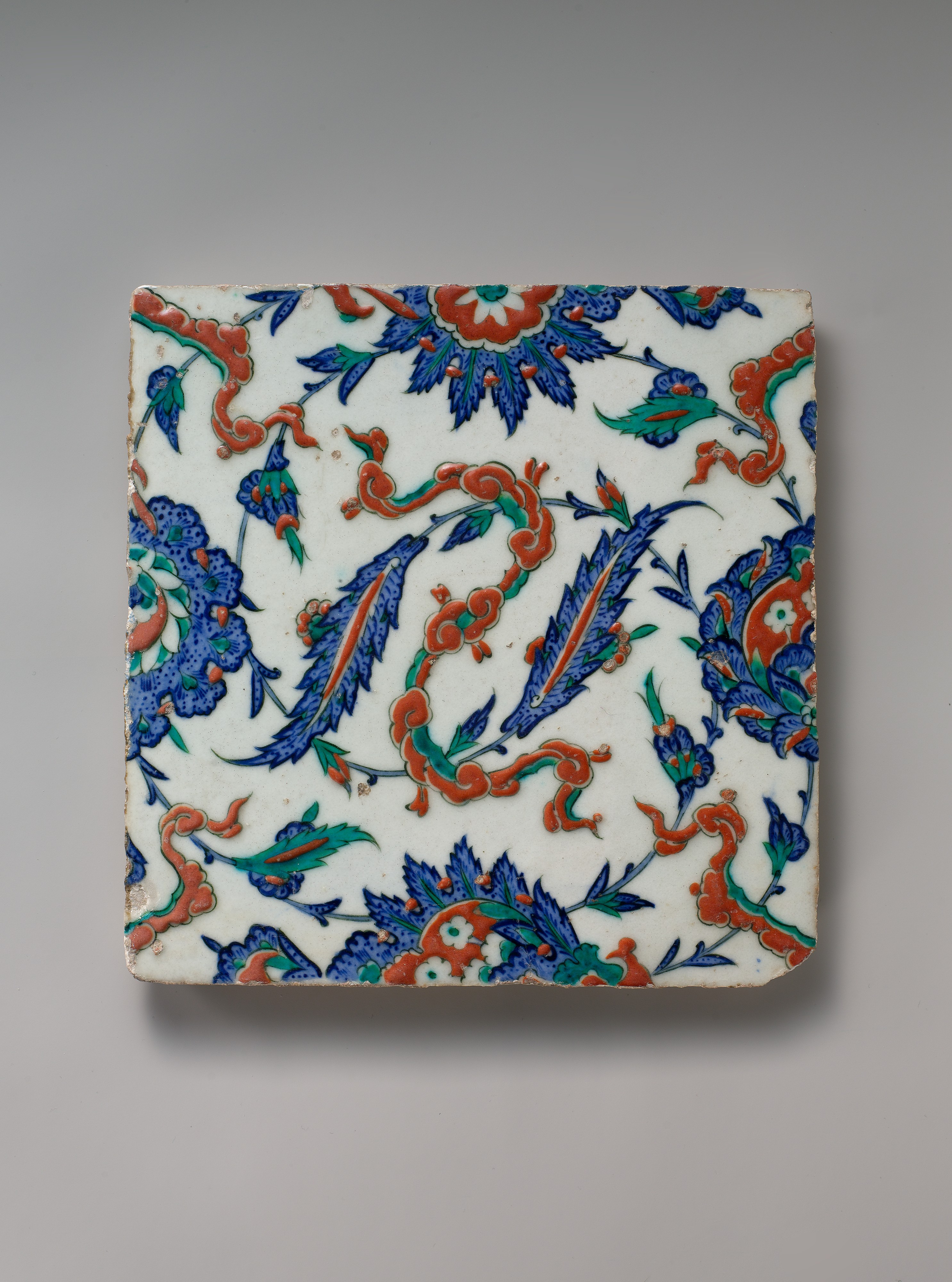
Tile with floral and Cloud-band design, c.1578, Iznik Tile, Ottoman Empire, in the collection of the Metropolitan Museum of Art.

== See also ==
- Culture of Turkey
- Empire of the Sultans
- Ottoman tents
- Alafranga and alaturca
