= Ercüment Ekrem Talu =

Turkish writer and journalist

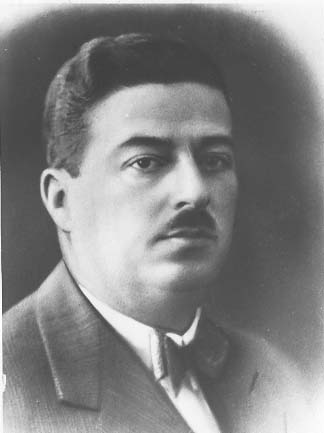
- Born: 1886; Istanbul, Ottoman Empire
- Died: December 16, 1956 (aged 69–70); Istanbul, Turkey
- Occupations: Writer, humorist, journalist
- Relatives: Recaizade Mahmud Ekrem (father); Çiğdem Talu (granddaughter)

Ercüment Ekrem Talu (1886 – December 16, 1956) was a Turkish writer, humorist and a journalist.

== Biography ==
He was born to Recaizade Mahmud Ekrem, a poet and writer of the Ottoman Empire era in Istanbul in 1886. After graduating from Galatasaray High School in 1905 and Faculty of Law, he went to Paris, France, for further studies in political sciences. He could speak and write in about nine foreign languages. In 1907, during the Ottoman Empire era, he became a civil servant in İstanbul. During the early days of the Republic of Turkey, he served as the Director General of the Press and Information. On March 12, 1924, he was appointed Secretary General of the President. He resigned from this post on April 30, 1924. Between 1931 and 1933, he served as counselor at the Turkish Embassy in Warsaw, Poland. Later, Talu worked as a teacher of French language at Teacher's College "Gazi Eğitim Enstitüsü", and as a teacher of literature at Galatasaray High School. His further functions were as executive at the City Theaters and City Waterworks. He contributed to several publications, including Yedigün magazine. He died on 16 December 1956 in İstanbul. Pop music lyricist Çiğdem Talu (1939–1983) was his granddaughter.

== Bibliography ==
Talu is known as a writert, columnist and humorist. His books are the following:

- 1920: Evliya-yı Cedid (New Evliya Çelebi)
- 1920: Asriler (Moderns)
- 1922: Gün Batarken (While the sun sets)
- 1922: Kopuk (Rascal)
- 1922: Sabri Efendinin Gelini (The bride of Sabri Effendi)
- 1923: Kan ve İman (Blood and faith)
- 1925: Sevgiliye Masallar (Tales to sweat heart)
- 1927: Meşhedi ile Devrialem (Around the World with Meşhedi)
- 1928: Gemi Arslanı (Figurehead)
- 1934: Meşhedi Aslan Peşinde (Meşhedi chasing lion)
- 1934: Kodaman (Big gun)
- 1938: Pepeloğlu
- 1939: Beyaz Şemsiyeli (With white umberalla)
- 1941: Bu Gönül Böyle Sevdi (This heart loves this way)
- 1945: Çömlekoğlu ve Ailesi (Çömlekoğlu and family)
- 1947: Meşhedi hikayeleri (Stories of Meşhedi)
- 1954: Büyük Nasreddin Hoca
