= Echinophora sibthorpiana =

Scientific classification
- Kingdom: Plantae
- Clade: Tracheophytes
- Clade: Angiosperms
- Clade: Eudicots
- Clade: Asterids
- Order: Apiales
- Family: Apiaceae
- Genus: Echinophora
- Species: E. sibthorpiana

Binomial name
- Echinophora sibthorpiana Guss. (1832)

Synonyms
- Echinophora tenuifolia subsp. sibthorpiana (Guss.) Tutin (1967); Echinophora tenuifolia var. sibthorpiana (Guss.) Fiori & Paol. (1900)

Species of flowering plant

Echinophora sibthorpiana, commonly known as Tarhana herb or Turkish pickling herb (Turkish çörtük), is a biennial or perennial herb native to southeastern Europe, Crimea, western and Central Asia, and northeastern Afghanistan.

It is sometimes used as a flavoring in tarhana and in pickles. It may also improve the fermentation of tarhana.

The primary constituents of its essential oil are δ-3-carene, methyleugenol, and α-phellandrene.

Some authors indicate that Hippomarathrum cristatum is the "tarhana herb".
