= Tarhana =

Dried food ingredient

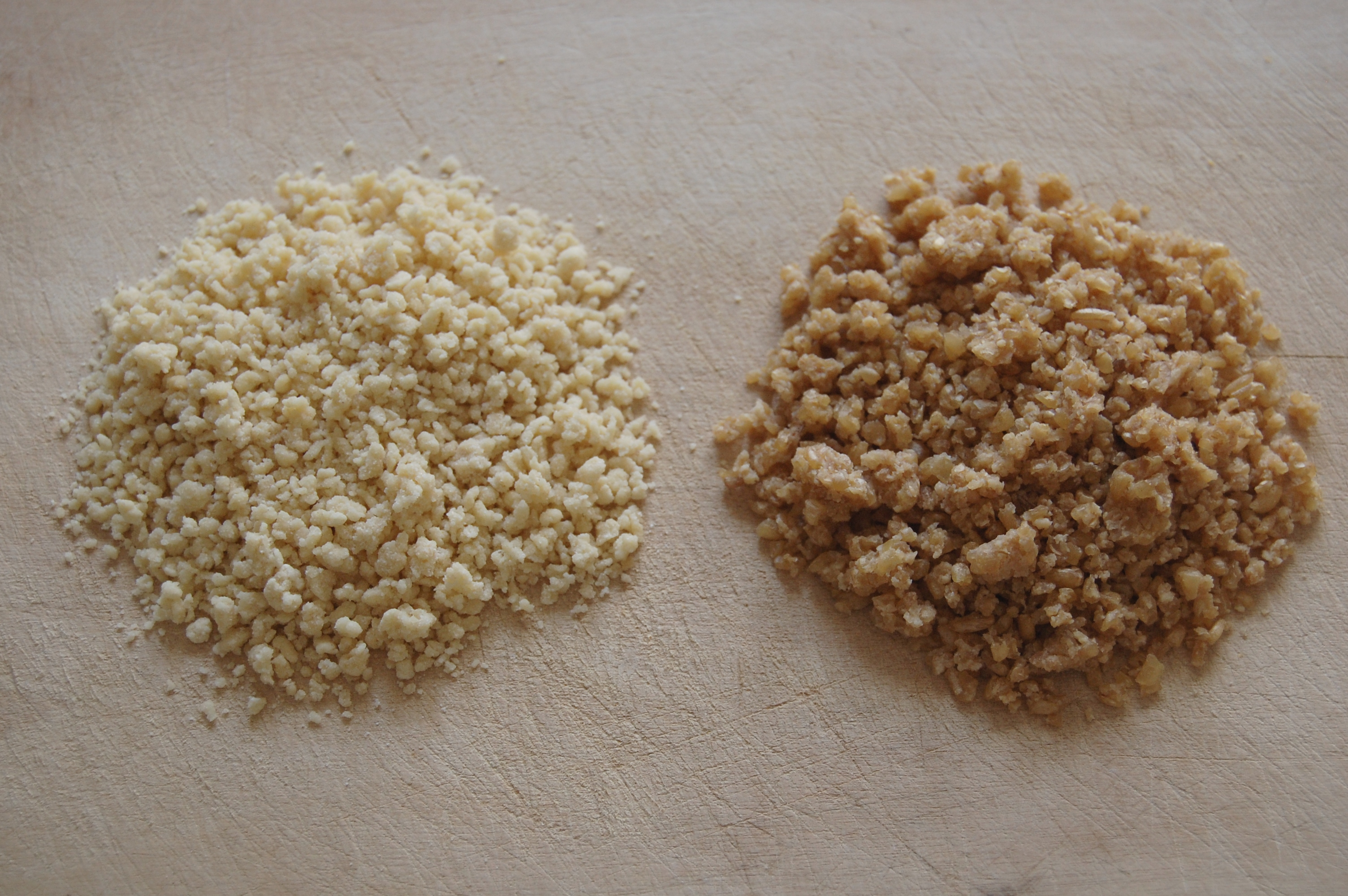
- Homemade wheat (left) and wholemeal wheat (right) tarhana in Greece
- Type: Soup starter
- Main ingredients: Grain, yoghurt or fermented milk

Tarhana is a dried food ingredient, based on a fermented mixture of grain and yogurt or fermented milk, found in Central Asian, Southeast European, and Middle Eastern cuisines. Dry tarhana has a texture of coarse, uneven crumbs, and it is usually made into a thick soup with water, stock, or milk. As it is both acidic and low in moisture, the milk proteins keep for long periods. Tarhana is very similar to some kinds of kashk.

Regional variations of the name include Armenian թարխանա (tarkhana); Greek τραχανάς (trahanás) or ξυνόχονδρος (xynohondros); Persian ترخینه، ترخانه، ترخوانه (tarkhineh, tarkhāneh, tarkhwāneh); Kurdish tarxane; Albanian trahana or tërhana; Bulgarian трахана or тархана (trahana, tarhana); Serbo-Croatian tarana, tarhana or trahana; Hungarian tarhonya; Turkish tarhana.

The Armenian tarkhana is made up of matzoon and eggs mixed with equal amounts of wheat flour and starch. Small pieces of dough are prepared and dried and then kept in glass containers and used mostly in soups, dissolving in hot liquids. The Greek trahanas contains only cracked wheat or a couscous-like paste and fermented milk. The Turkish tarhana consists of cracked wheat (or flour), yoghurt, and vegetables, fermented and then dried. In Cyprus, it is considered a national specialty, and is often served with pieces of halloumi cheese in it. In Albania it is prepared with wheat, yoghurt and butter, and served with hot olive oil and feta cheese.

== Etymology ==
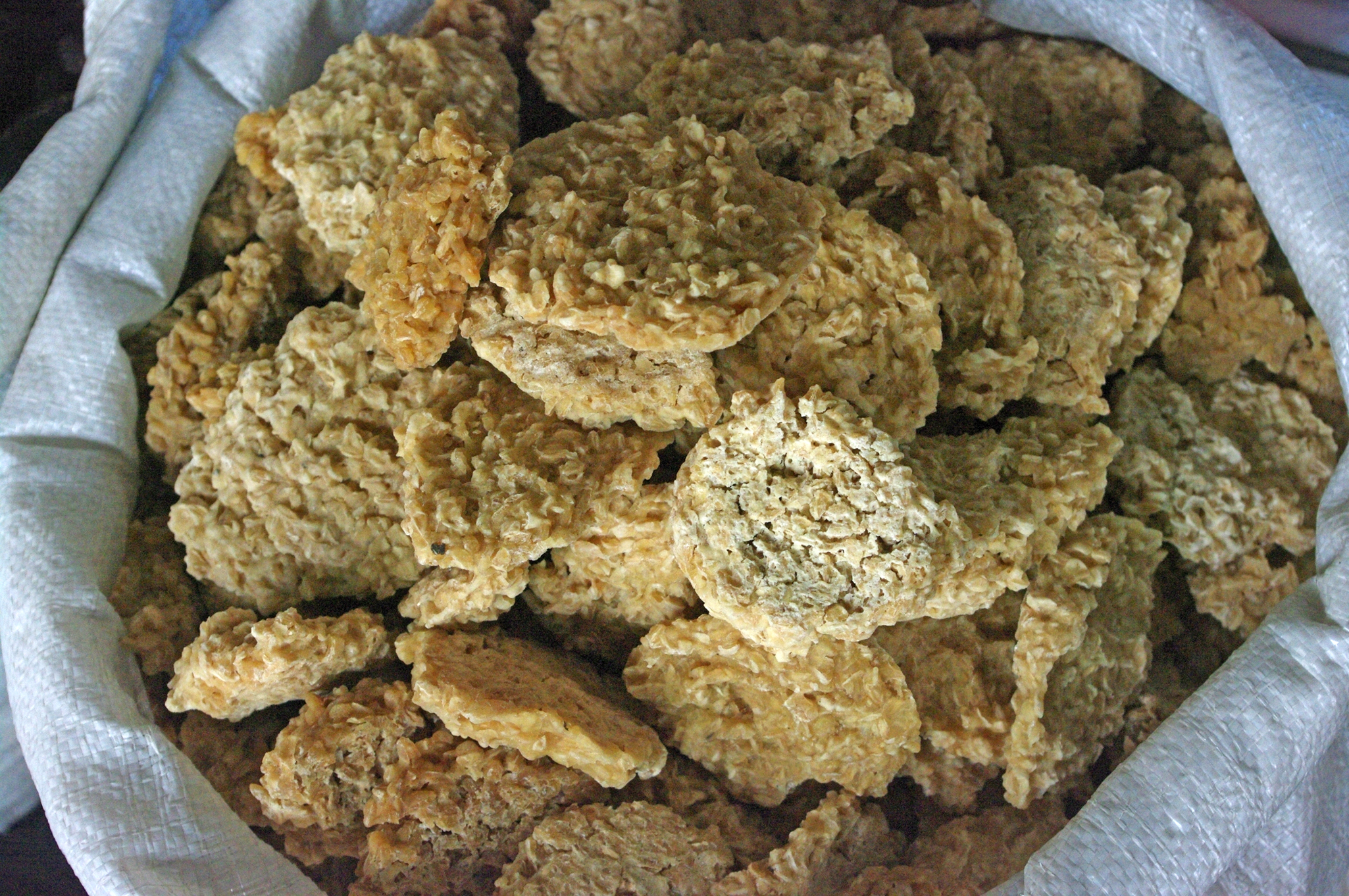
Tarhana sold at a local store in Kozan, Adana

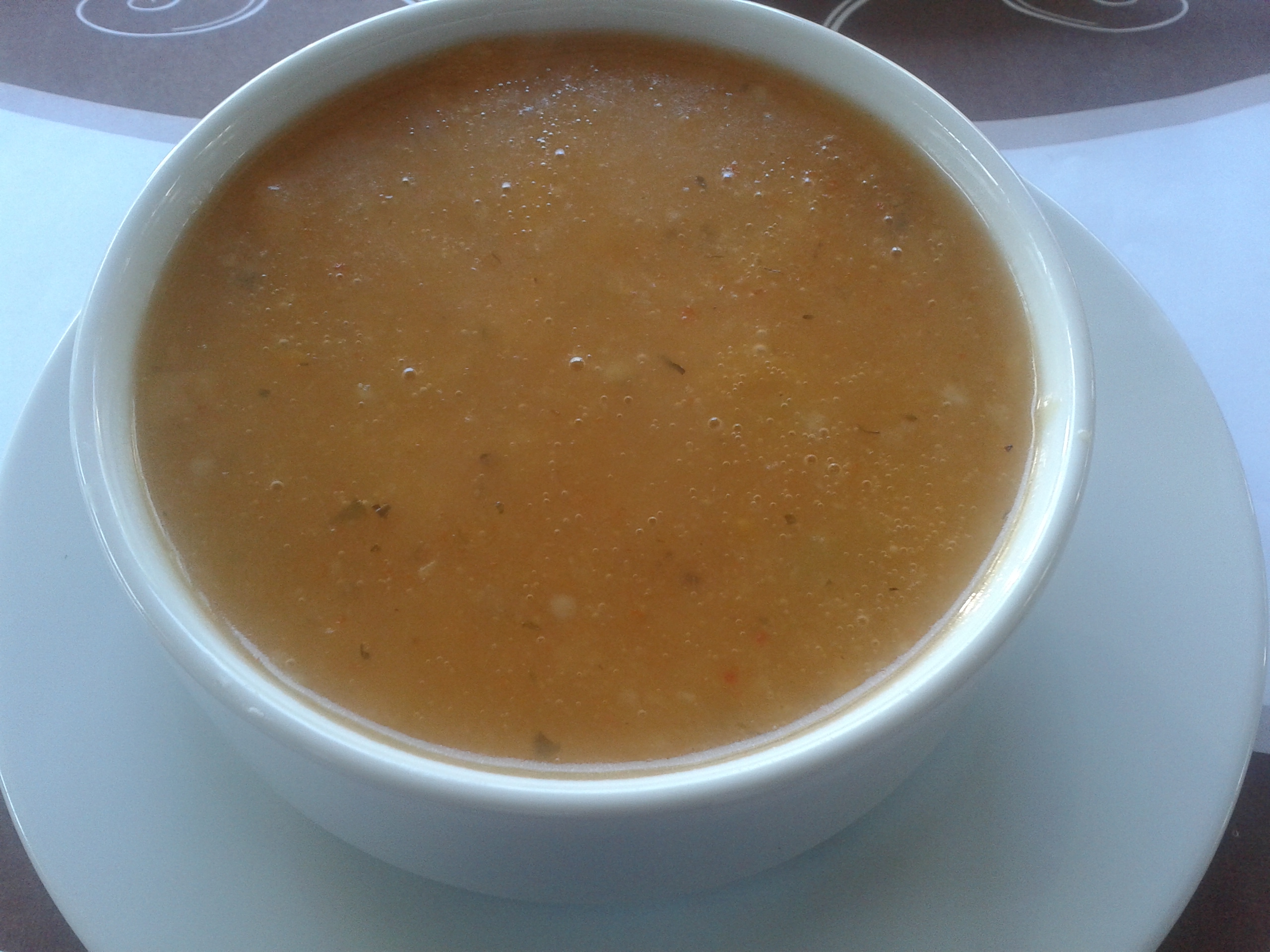
Tarhana soup

Hill and Bryer suggest that the term tarhana is related to Greek τρακτόν (trakton, romanized as tractum), a thickener Apicius wrote about in the 1st century CE which most other authors consider to be a sort of cracker crumb. Dalby (1996) connects it to the Greek τραγός/τραγανός (tragos/traganos), described (and condemned) in Galen's Geoponica 3.8. Weaver (2002) also considers it of Western origin.

Perry, on the other hand, considers that the phonetic evolution of τραγανός to tarhana is unlikely, and that it probably comes from Persian: ترخوانه, romanized: tarkhwāneh. He considers the resemblance to τραγανός and to τραχύς 'coarse' coincidental, though he speculates that τραχύς may have influenced the word by folk etymology.

In Persian language sources, al-Zamakhshari mentioned the name of this food in the 11th century in the form tarkhana in his dictionary; it is attested in the 17th century in the form tarkhina in the Farhang-i Jahangiri, a Persian dictionary created under the reign of Jahangir. Tar تر in Persian means 'wet, soaked', and khwān خوان (pronounced khān) means 'dining place/table, food, large wooden bowl'. Thus in Persian it would mean 'watered or soaked food', which matches the way the soup is made: tarhana must be soaked in water, and other possible ingredients are then added and cooked for some time.

== Manufacture ==
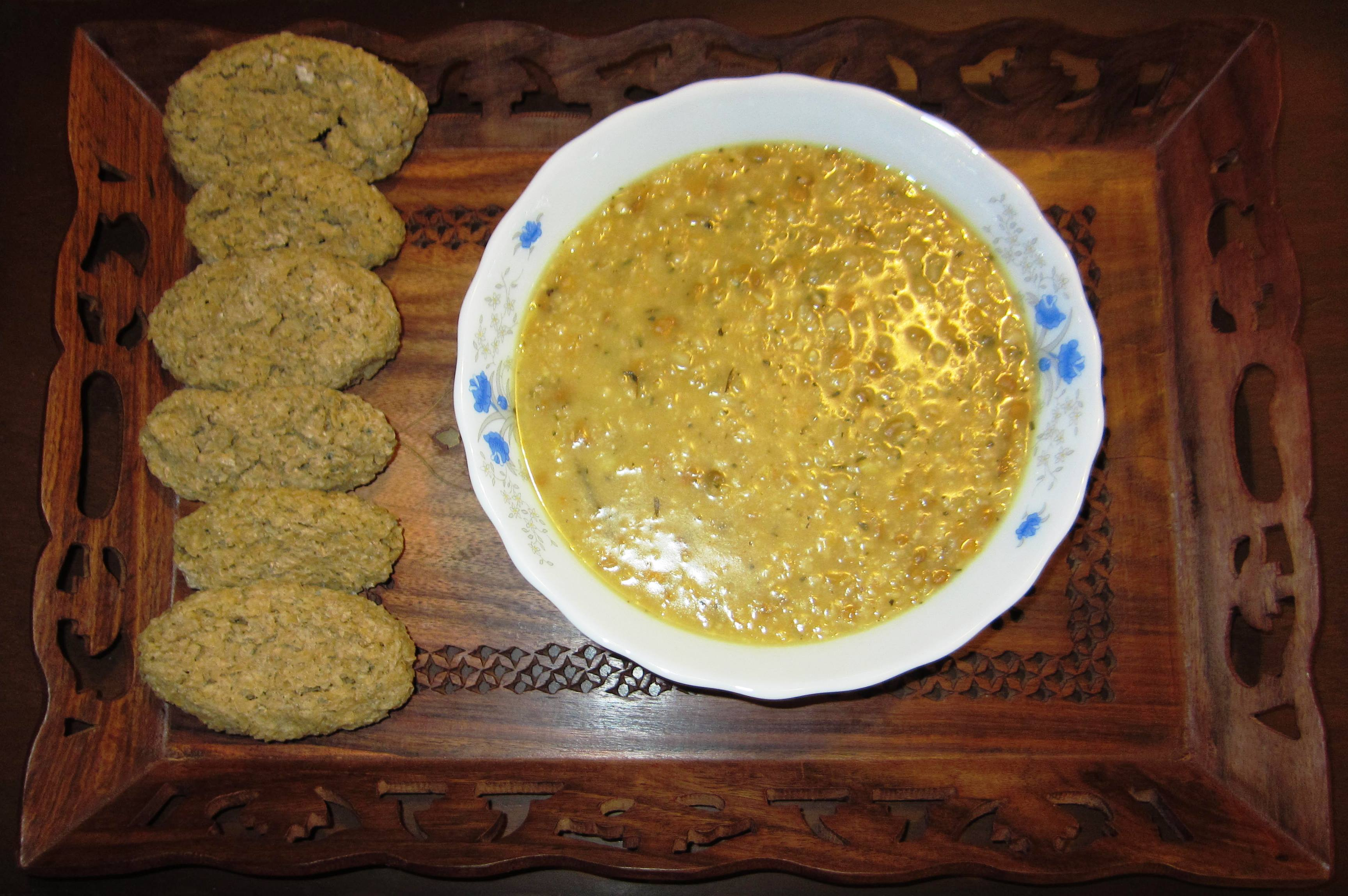
Solid tarhana (left), prepared tarhana (right)

Tarhana is made by mixing flour, yoghurt or sour milk, and optionally cooked vegetables, salt, groats, and spices (notably tarhana herb), letting the mixture ferment, then drying, and usually grinding and sieving the result. The fermentation produces lactic acid and other compounds giving tarhana its characteristic sour taste and good keeping properties: the pH is lowered to 3.4–4.2, and the drying step reduces the moisture content to 6–10%, resulting in a medium inhospitable to pathogens and spoilage organisms, while preserving the milk proteins.

== Preparation ==
Tarhana is cooked as a thick soup by adding it to stock, water, or milk, and simmering. Alternatively, it may be fried and then cooked in only as much liquid as it will absorb.

In Albania, it is made with wheat flour and yogurt into small pasta-like chunks which are dried and crushed; the powder is used to cook a soup which is served with bread cubes. In Cyprus it is common to add cubes of Halloumi cheese towards the end of cooking.

== See also ==
- List of soups
- Tarhonya, a Hungarian noodle whose name comes from tarhana
- Frumenty, a Western European equivalent
- Kashk (qurut)
- Tsampa, a similar product in Tibet and Nepal

== Bibliography ==
- Françoise Aubaile-Sallenave, "Al-Kishk: the past and present of a complex culinary practice", in Sami Zubaida and Richard Tapper, A Taste of Thyme: Culinary Cultures of the Middle East, London and New York, 1994 and 2000, ISBN 1-86064-603-4.
- Elisabeth Luard, The Old World Kitchen, ISBN 0-553-05219-5
