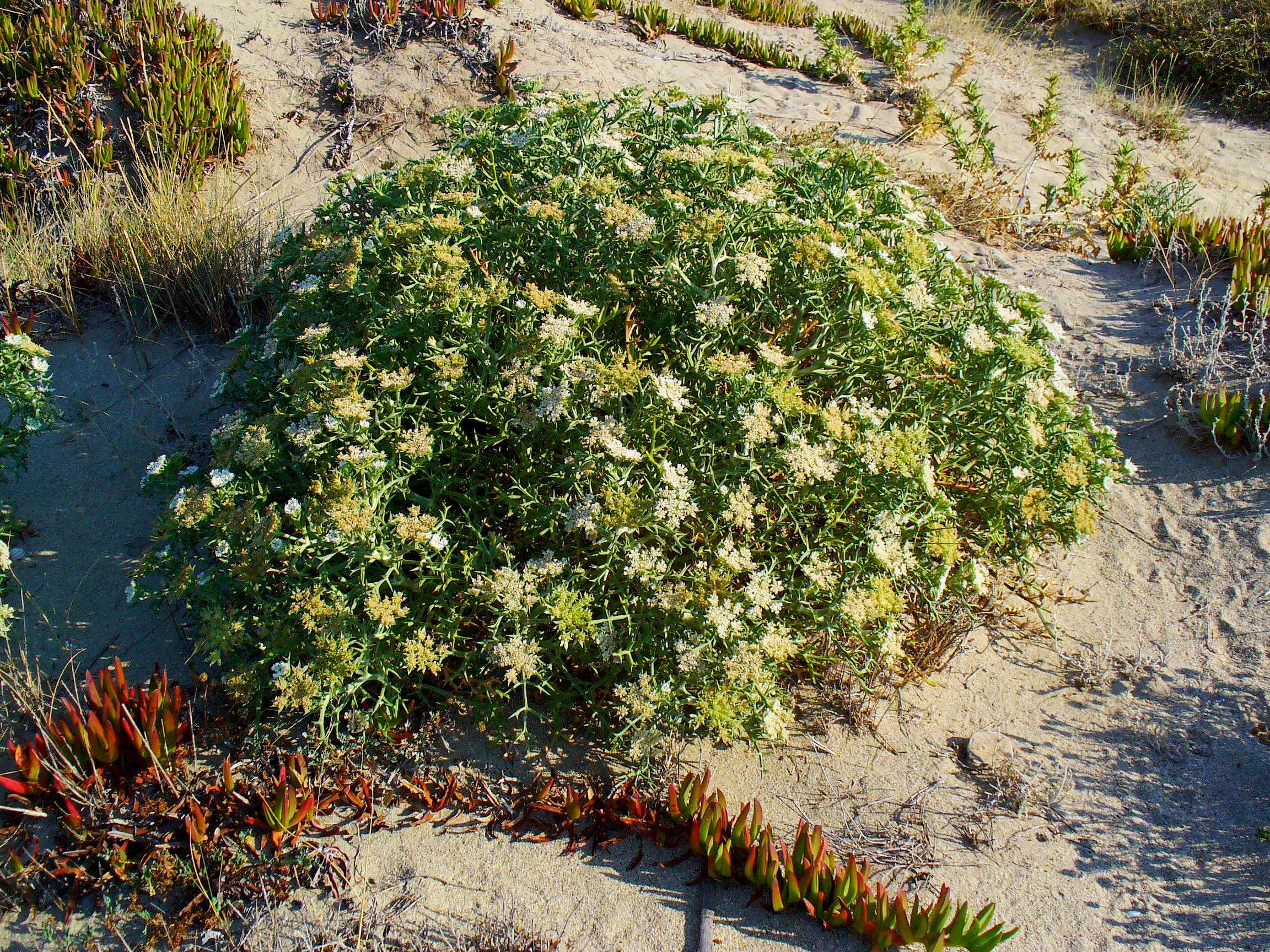

Scientific classification
- Kingdom: Plantae
- Clade: Tracheophytes
- Clade: Angiosperms
- Clade: Eudicots
- Clade: Asterids
- Order: Apiales
- Family: Apiaceae
- Genus: Echinophora
- Species: E. spinosa

Binomial name
- Echinophora spinosa L.

Synonyms
- Selinum spinosum (L.) E.H.L.Krause

= Echinophora spinosa =

Species of flowering plant

Echinophora spinosa, the prickly parsnip, is a species of plant in the genus Echinophora found in Europe.
