= Recaizade Mahmud Ekrem =

Ottoman civil servant, writer and literary critic

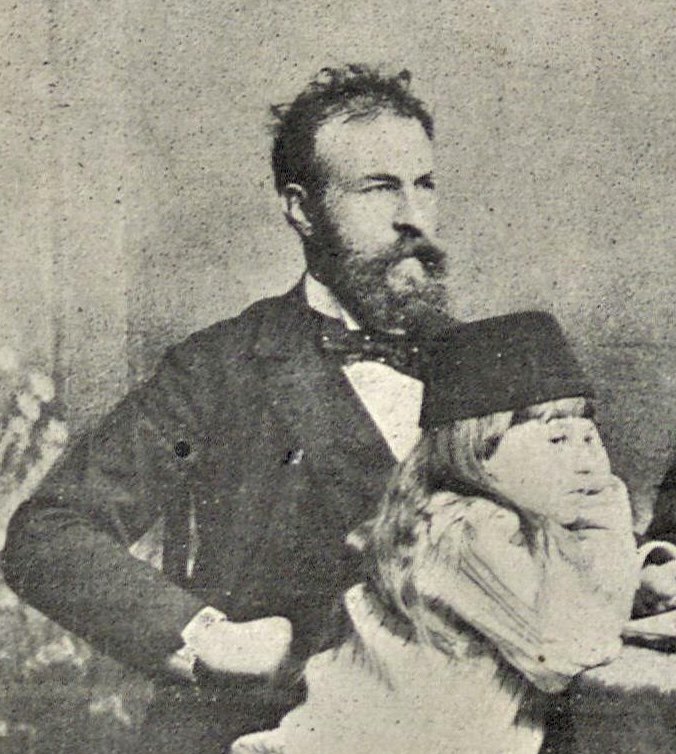
- Born: 1 March 1847; Istanbul, Ottoman Empire
- Died: 31 January 1914 (aged 66); Istanbul, Ottoman Empire
- Occupation: Writer
- Children: Ercüment Ekrem Talu

Recaizade Mahmud Ekrem (Ottoman Turkish: رجاﺋﻰ زاده محمود اكرم; 1 March 1847 – 31 January 1914) was a Turkish civil servant, writer, literary critic, and intellectual, who was known for his apolitical views. He wrote poems, dramas and novels, dealt extensively with European literary theories and was one of the most influential, authoritative writers of his time.

== Life ==
His father worked at the Academy of Sciences, and at the age of fifteen he became an official in the Ministry of Foreign Affairs and later in various other branches. As a teacher, he wrote his own teaching material and did a systematic literary scientific work that benefited future generations.

Like most writers of that time, Ekrem belonged to the circle of the Sultan's court. He became acquainted with Namık Kemal, Abdülhak Hâmid Tarhan and other famous personalities of the time and was close friends with most of them. It was he who, after Şinasi and Namık Kemal, took over the "Young Turks" newspaper Tasvir-i Efkar (Writer of Ideas) and for many years pursued literature and civil service at the same time.

Ekrem founded the famous magazine Servet-i Fünûn (Wealth of the Sciences) and gathered in the editorial board of the young and established literati. It is known that he set quality as the highest standard and even recalled his son from the line. The famous poet Tevfik Fikret, who for some time held the literary direction, was one of Ekrems students at the prestigious Galatasaray High School.

Intensive promotion of Turkish literature and literary generations was achieved through the magazine Servet-i Fünun, which Ekrem founded.
