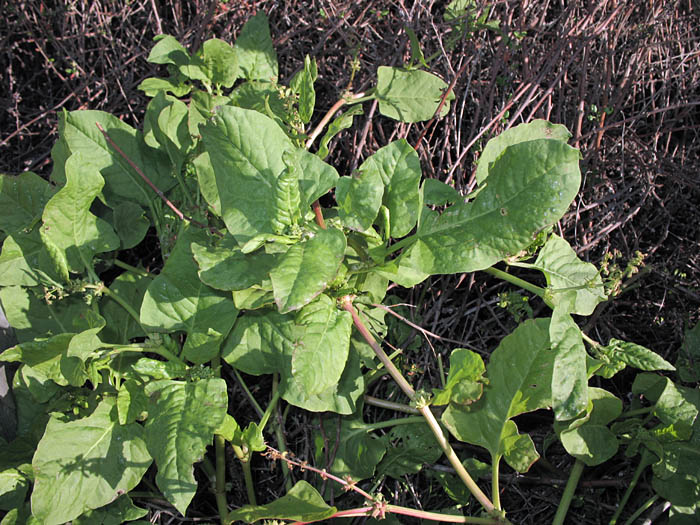

Scientific classification
- Kingdom: Plantae
- Clade: Tracheophytes
- Clade: Angiosperms
- Clade: Eudicots
- Order: Caryophyllales
- Family: Polygonaceae
- Genus: Rumex
- Species: R. spinosus

Binomial name
- Rumex spinosus L.

Synonyms
- Centopodium spinosum (L.) Burch.; Emex spinosa (L.) Campd.; Rumex glaber Forssk.; Vibo spinosa (L.) Medik.

= Rumex spinosus =

Species of flowering plant

Rumex spinosus (synonym Emex spinosa), commonly known as devil's thorn, spiny dock, or lesser jack, is an annual herbaceous plant of the Polygonaceae. It originates in the warmer parts of the Old World, but now has spread with humans to other places. It is common in disturbed areas, especially in sandy soils. It has shown some weedy behaviour in restricted areas within southern Australia.

== Description ==
The lesser jack tends to grow as a sprawling weed. The leaves are plain in shape, resembling spinach. The flowers of different sexes are clustered separately on the same plant. The plant produces many seeds with a hard, prickly casing. These are produced both in clusters along the branches and at the base of the stem. The root is thick and succulent. At the end of the plant's life, the root dries up and pulls the seeds at the base of the stem into the ground. The spiny, durable seeds make the plant a nuisance around human habitats, much like the similarly shaped seeds of Tribulus terrestris.

== Taxonomy ==
Rumex spinosus was first described by Carl Linnaeus in 1753. It was transferred to the genus Emex by Francisco Campderá in 1819. However in 2015, Schuster et al. demoted Emex to a subgenus of Rumex, restoring the species to Linnaeus's original genus. a move accepted by Plants of the World Online, among other sources.

== Uses ==
Although bitter, the root and leaves can be eaten.
