= Kozan =

Kozan may refer to:

- Kozan, Adana in Turkey
- Kozan, Hiroshima in Japan
- Larnakas tis Lapithou, a village in Cyprus, whose Turkish name is Kozan
