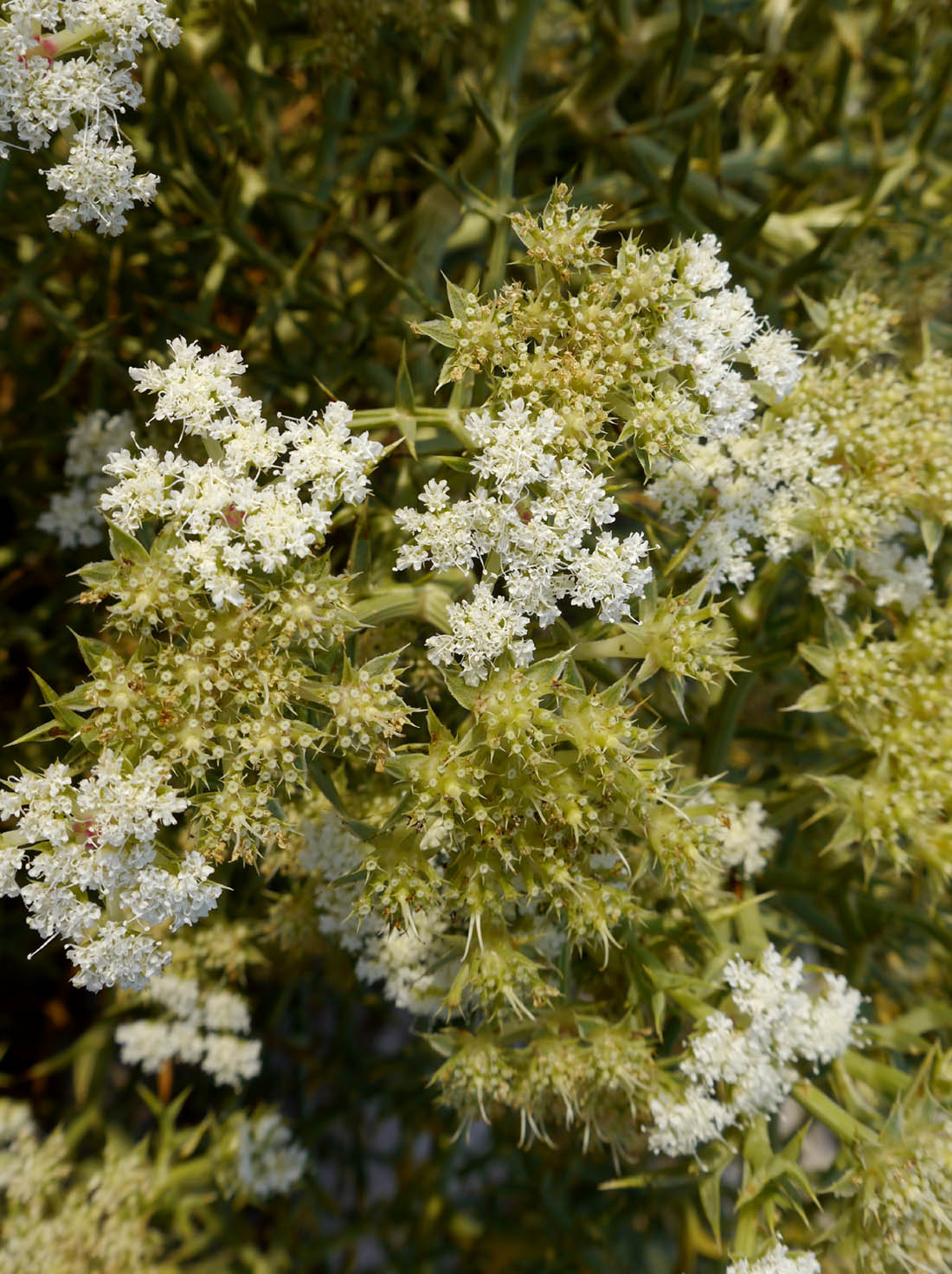
- Echinophora spinosa

Scientific classification
- Kingdom: Plantae
- Clade: Tracheophytes
- Clade: Angiosperms
- Clade: Eudicots
- Clade: Asterids
- Order: Apiales
- Family: Apiaceae
- Subfamily: Apioideae
- Tribe: Echinophoreae
- Genus: Echinophora; L.

Species
- See text

= Echinophora =

Genus of flowering plants

Echinophora is a genus of plants belonging to the parsley family, Apiaceae. The thistle-like spininess of the plants is reflected in the genus name, composed of the Greek prefix echino- meaning "spiny" (from ἐχῖνος echīnos "hedgehog") and the suffix -phora meaning "carrier", giving the meaning "spine-bearer".

== Species ==
The genus comprises 11 accepted species

Name
Echinophora chrysantha Freyn & Sint.
Echinophora cinerea (Boiss.) Hedge & Lamond
Echinophora lamondiana Yildiz & Z.Bahcecioglu
Echinophora orientalis Hedge & Lamond
Echinophora platyloba DC.
Echinophora scabra Gilli
Echinophora sibthorpiana Guss.
Echinophora spinosa L.
Echinophora tenuifolia L.
Echinophora tournefortii Jaub. & Spach
Echinophora trichophylla Sm.
