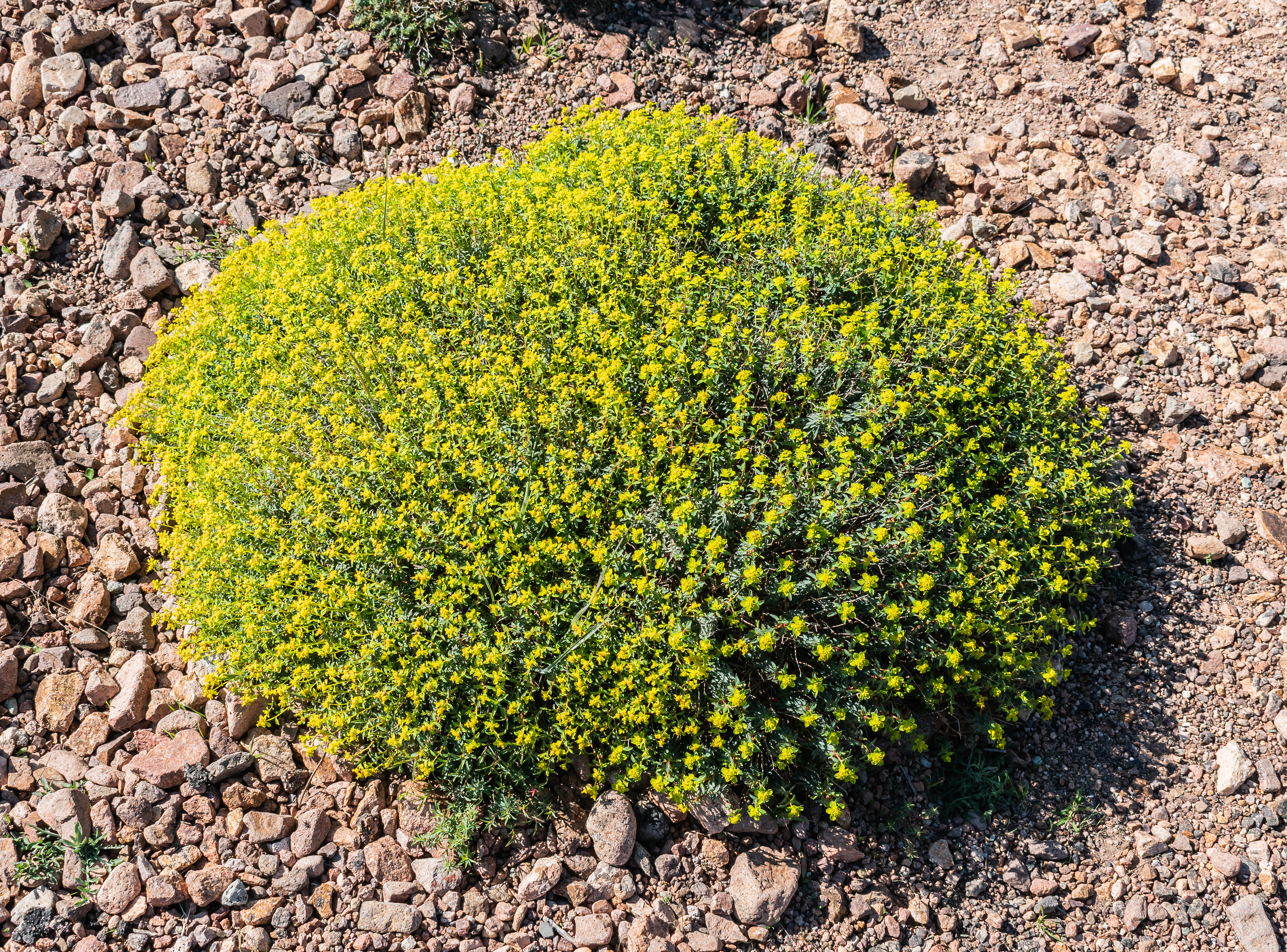
- In commune of Saint-Raphaël, Var, France

Scientific classification
- Kingdom: Plantae
- Clade: Embryophytes
- Clade: Tracheophytes
- Clade: Angiosperms
- Clade: Eudicots
- Clade: Rosids
- Order: Malpighiales
- Family: Euphorbiaceae
- Genus: Euphorbia
- Species: E. spinosa

Binomial name
- Euphorbia spinosa L.

Subspecies
- E. s. subsp. glabriflora; E. s. subsp. ligustica; E. s. subsp. spinosa

Synonyms
- Galarhoeus spinosus; Tithymalus spinosus

= Euphorbia spinosa =

Plant species in the spurge family

Euphorbia spinosa, the spiny spurge, is a species of spurge that grows in habitats around the Mediterranean Sea, mainly in Europe.

== Description ==
Spiny spurge is a small spiny shrub growing 10 to 20 centimeters (4–8 in) tall. Its stems are thin and branch freely to form a rounded and spiny mound. It is similar to Greek spiny spurge (Euphorbia acanthothamnos), but with stems that are not as stiff and weakly spiny tips that are not sharp. The plants are hairless and have few leaves. What leaves they have are bluish-green, narrowly lanceolate, and about 1 cm long.

== Taxonomy ==
Euphorbia spinosa was given its scientific name by Carl Linnaeus in 1753. It is classified as part of the Euphorbia genus within the Euphorbiaceae family and has three accepted subspecies.

- Euphorbia spinosa subsp. glabriflora – Native to the western Balkan Peninsula
- Euphorbia spinosa subsp. ligustica – Native to the Italian peninsula
- Euphorbia spinosa subsp. spinosa – Widespread southern Europe and Libya

Euphorbia spinosa has 20 synonyms of the species or one of its three subspecies.

Table of Synonyms
| Name | Year | Rank | Synonym of: | Notes |
|---|---|---|---|---|
| Euphorbia fragifera var. inermis Nyman | 1881 | variety | subsp. glabriflora | = het. |
| Euphorbia glabriflora Vis. | 1865 | species | subsp. glabriflora | ≡ hom. |
| Euphorbia haworthii Sweet | 1826 | species | subsp. spinosa | = het., nom. illeg. homonym. post. |
| Euphorbia inermis Pančić ex Boiss. | 1866 | species | subsp. glabriflora | = het., nom. illeg. homonym. post. |
| Euphorbia linariifolia Willd. | 1799 | species | subsp. spinosa | = het., nom. illeg. homonym. post. |
| Euphorbia linarioides Poir. | 1812 | species | subsp. spinosa | = het. |
| Euphorbia petaloides G.Don | 1830 | species | subsp. spinosa | = het. |
| Euphorbia pindicola Hausskn. | 1897 | species | subsp. glabriflora | = het. |
| Euphorbia pubescens var. glabriflora (Vis.) Nyman | 1881 | variety | subsp. glabriflora | ≡ hom. |
| Euphorbia pungens Lam. | 1788 | species | subsp. spinosa | = het. |
| Euphorbia rigens Sweet | 1830 | species | subsp. spinosa | = het. |
| Euphorbia rigidula Steud. | 1840 | species | subsp. spinosa | = het. |
| Euphorbia spinosa var. brachyadenia Boiss. | 1862 | variety | subsp. spinosa | = het. |
| Euphorbia spinosa var. inermis Boiss. | 1862 | variety | subsp. spinosa | = het. |
| Euphorbia spinosa f. ligustica Fiori | 1901 | form | subsp. ligustica | ≡ hom. |
| Galarhoeus spinosus (L.) Haw. | 1812 | species | E. spinosa | ≡ hom. |
| Keraselma pungens (Lam.) Raf. | 1840 | species | subsp. spinosa | = het. |
| Tithymalus diffusus Lam. | 1779 | species | subsp. spinosa | = het. |
| Tithymalus glabriflorus (Vis.) Soják | 1972 | species | subsp. glabriflora | ≡ hom. |
| Tithymalus spinosus (L.) Raf. | 1838 | species | E. spinosa | ≡ hom. |
Notes: ≡ homotypic synonym; = heterotypic synonym

=== Names ===
Euphorbia spinosa is known by the common names spiny spurge or thorny spurge. However, the central and southern European species Euphorbia verrucosa is also called spiny spurge at times.

== Range and habitat ==
It is native to the Mediterranean basin mostly in Europe, but also to Libya in North Africa. In southwestern Europe it grows in Spain, France, Corsica, and Sardinia. While in southeastern Europe it is found in Sicily, Italy, Croatia, Bosnia & Hercegovina, Montenegro, Serbia, Kosovo, North Macedonia, Albania and Greece. In Turkey its range crosses over to southwestern Anatolia, in Asia. It grows in dry, rocky areas.
