= List of Turkish women writers =

This is a list of Turkish women writers who are Ottoman or Turkish nationals and who write in Turkish language.

== A ==
- Halide Edib Adıvar (1884–1964), novelist, nationalist, feminist
- Adalet Ağaoğlu (1929–2020), prominent novelist, playwright, essayist, memoirist, short story writer
- Süreyya Ağaoğlu (1903–1989), lawyer, non-fiction writer
- Zeynep Ahunbay (born 1946), educator, works on preservation of cultural heritage
- Gülten Akın (1933–2015), influential poet, playwright, works widely translated
- Seza Kutlar Aksoy (born 1945), children's writer
- Alev Alatlı (1944–2024), best selling novelist, economist, columnist, playwright, translator
- Süreyya Aylin Antmen (born 1981), poet, essayist
- Nezihe Araz (1920–2009), religious writer, journalist
- Meltem Arıkan (born 1968), novelist, playwright, columnist
- Ayşe Arman (born 1969), journalist, columnist
- Duygu Asena (1946–2006), journalist, best selling non-fiction author on women's rights
- Aydilge, full name Aydilge Sarp (born 1979), poet, songwriter, short story writer
- Samiha Ayverdi (1905–1993), novelist, mystic

== B ==
- Oya Baydar (born 1940), sociologist, novelist
- Nazan Bekiroğlu (born 1957), novelist, essayist
- Seyla Benhabib (born 1950), Turkish-American philosopher, non-fiction writer, biographer
- Üstün Bilgen-Reinart (born 1947), Turkish-born Canadian journalist, non-fiction writer
- Sevim Burak (1931–1983), novelist, playwright, letter writer

== C ==
- Peride Celal (1916–2013), novelist, short story writer
- Hasibe Çerko (born 1971), storyteller, philosopher
- Fethiye Çetin (born 1950), lawyer, human rights activist, novelist
- Muazzez İlmiye Çığ (1914–2024), archaeologist, works on Sumerian and Middle-Eastern civilization
- Zehra Çırak (born 1960), Turkish-born German poet, short story writer
- Nuriye Ulviye Mevlan Civelek (1893–1964) journalist and magazine owner
- Alev Croutier (born c. 1945), Turkish-born American novelist, non-fiction writer, screenwriter

== D ==
- Suat Derviş (1904 oder 1905–1972), Turkish female novelist, journalist, and political activist
- Güzin Dino (1910–2013), non-fiction writer, translator of Turkish works into French
- Nurduran Duman (born 1974), poet, essayist, translator

== E ==
- Aslı Erdoğan (born 1967), novelist, human rights activist, columnist, some works translated into English

== F ==
- Fitnat Hanım (18th century), early poet
- Füruzan (1932–2024), pen name of Füruzan Yerdelen (1932–2024), short story writer, novelist, screenwriter

== G ==
- Nilüfer Göle (born 1953), sociologist, non-fiction writer
- Aysel Gürel (1929–2008), lyricist, actress, author of many Turkish popular songs
- Azmiye Hami Güven (1904–1954), novelist

== K ==
- Yadé Kara (born 1965), Turkish-born German-language novelist
- Suzan Emine Kaube (born 1942), Turkish-born German-language novelist, poet
- Rabia Kazan (born 1976), journalist, feminist, television host
- Birhan Keskin (born 1963), poet
- Ayşe Kulin (born 1941), popular novelist, short story writer, columnist; several works translated into English
- İsmet Kür (1916–2013), educator, journalist, columnist and writer of mainly children's literature
- Pınar Kür (1943–2025), novelist, dramatist, and translator; daughter of İsmet

== L ==
- Nuray Lale (born 1962), novelist, translator

== M ==
- Perihan Mağden (born 1960), novelist, journalist, columnist, several works translated into English
- Nilgün Marmara (1958–1987), poet, some poems translated into English
- Nuray Mert (born 1960), journalist, educator, television presenter
- Nezihe Muhiddin (1889–1958), journalist, novelist, politician, feminist
- Lale Müldür (born 1956), influential poet, novelist, columnist

== N ==
- Nigâr Hanım (1856–1918), major poet, playwright, memoirist

== O ==
- Birgül Oğuz (born 1981), novelist
- Meral Okay (1959–2012), actress, screenwriter
- Sevin Okyay (born 1942), journalist, critic, novelist, translator
- Emine Semiye Önasya (1864–1944), educator, textbook writer, novelist
- Aysel Özakın (born 1942), novelist, short story writer, children's writer, writing in Turkish, German and English
- Emine Sevgi Özdamar (born 1949), German-language playwright, short story writer, novelist
- Tezer Özlü (1943–1986), novelist

== P ==
- Zeynep Sevde Paksu (born 1983), children's writer, publisher

== S ==
- Güzide Sabri Aygün (1886–1946), romance novelist
- Elif Şafak (born 1971), acclaimed novelist, columnist, feminist
- Pınar Selek (born 1971), sociologist, feminist, journalist, editor
- Neslihan Şenocak (born c.1976), historian, writer, professor
- Sabiha Sertel (1895–1968), early feminist journalist, essayist
- Sevgi Soysal (1936–1976), novelist, short story writer, memoirist
- Edibe Sözen (born 1961), sociologist, politician, writings on sociology

== T ==
- Suna Tanaltay (1933–2021), poet, writer, psychologist
- Sevim Tekeli (1924–2019), educator, works on astronomy, cartography
- Latife Tekin (born 1957), influential feminist, novelist, playwright, memoirist
- Ece Temelkuran (born 1973), journalist, columnist, novelist, television presenter
- Arzu Toker (born 1952), journalist, anti-Islam activist, lives in the Netherlands
- Fatma Aliye Topuz (1862–1936), columnist, essayist, novelist, feminist
- Ayfer Tunç (born 1964), novelist, short story writer, essayist

== U ==
- Bahriye Üçok (1919–1990), theologian, columnist, feminist
- Buket Uzuner (born 1955), widely translated novelist, short story writer, travel writer

== Z ==
- Zafer Hanım (19th century), first Turkish novelist
- Ayşe Nur Zarakolu (1946–2002), publisher, human rights advocate
- Halide Nusret Zorlutuna (1901–1984), poet, novelist, short story writer, autobiographer

== See also ==
- List of women writers
- Turkish women writers
