= Turkish women writers =

Women contributors to Turkish literature

Turkish women writers refers to Turkish women contributors to Turkish literature. The area is parallel to women's writing in English.

== Pioneers ==
During the Ottoman era, there were only a few woman poets and novelists. Professor Nazan Bekiroğlu gives the priority to two woman poets; Zeynep Hatun and Mihri Hatun who lived in the 15th century. But probably the best known woman poet was Fitnat Hanım of the 18th century. The first Ottoman novelists were Zafer Hanım who was the first author of a novel published in 1877 and Fatma Aliye who is considered by many as the first Turkish female novelist. (Hatun and Hanım are titles equivalent to "lady"). Fatma Aliye's sister Emine Semiye Önasya was also a novelist and textbook author.

== Early Republican era ==
The number of women poets and novelists increased sharply during the Turkish Republic (after 1923). The first novelists during the Republican era were Azmiye Hami Güven, author of a novel, Hemșire Nimet (Nimet, the Nurse), and several published stories, and Halide Edib Adıvar.

== Anthologies in English ==
The Oxford Guide to Literature in English Translation (2001) notes a boom in women's writing in Turkey, but notes that these writers have failed to attract attention outside Turkey. One of the first major anthologies of Turkish women authors was a collection translated by Nilüfer Mizanoğlu Reddy (1988).

== Notable writers and poets ==
- Adalet Ağaoğlu
- Afet İnan
- Alev Alatlı
- Aslı Erdoğan
- Ayşe Arman
- Ayşe Kulin
- Bahriye Üçok
- Birgül Ayman Güler
- Birgül Oğuz
- Buket Uzuner
- Duygu Asena
- Elif Şafak
- Emine Semiye Önasya
- Fatma Aliye Topuz
- Gülriz Sururi
- Gülten Akın
- Güzin Dino
- Halide Edib Adıvar
- Halide Nusret Zorlutuna
- İnci Asena
- İpek Ongun
- Kerime Nadir
- Lale Müldür
- Latife Tekin
- Leyla Neyzi
- Meltem Arıkan
- Mîna Urgan
- Muazzez İlmiye Çığ
- Muazzez Tahsin Berkand
- Mükerrem Kamil Su
- Nermin Abadan Unat
- Nezihe Muhiddin
- Nurduran Duman
- Peride Celal
- Perihan Mağden
- Sabiha Sertel
- Sema Kaygusuz
- Sevgi Soysal
- Sevim Burak
- Sevin Okyay
- Sevtap Baycılı
- Suat Derviş
- Suna Tanaltay
- Süreyya Ağaoğlu
- Tomris Uyar
- Üstün Bilgen-Reinart
- Zeynep Ahunbay

== See also ==
- List of Turkish women writers

== Gallery ==
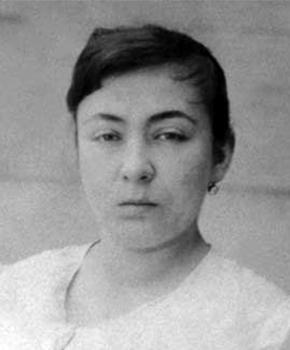
Fatma Aliye

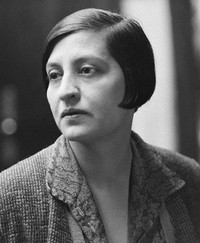
Halide Edib Adıvar

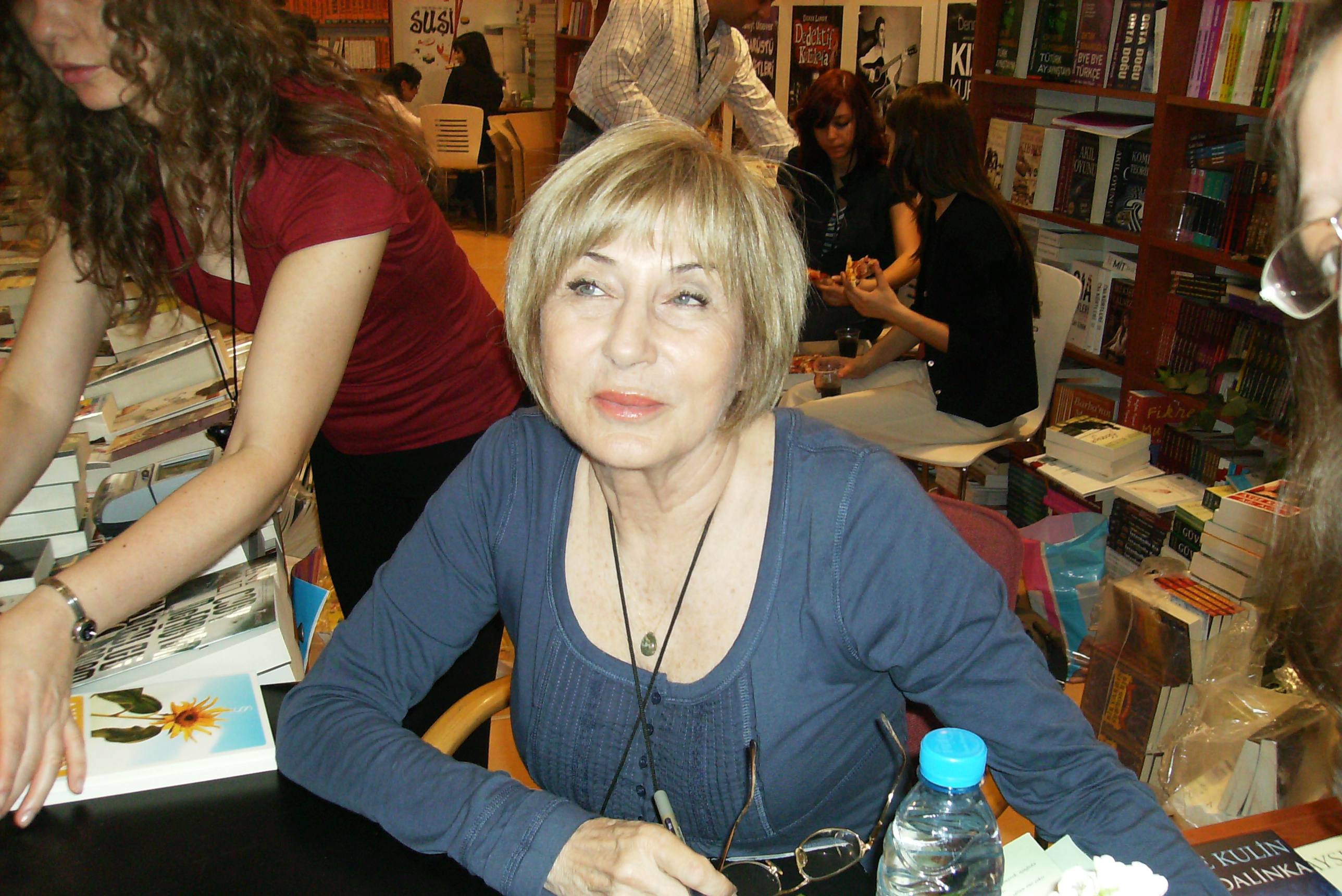
Ayşe Kulin

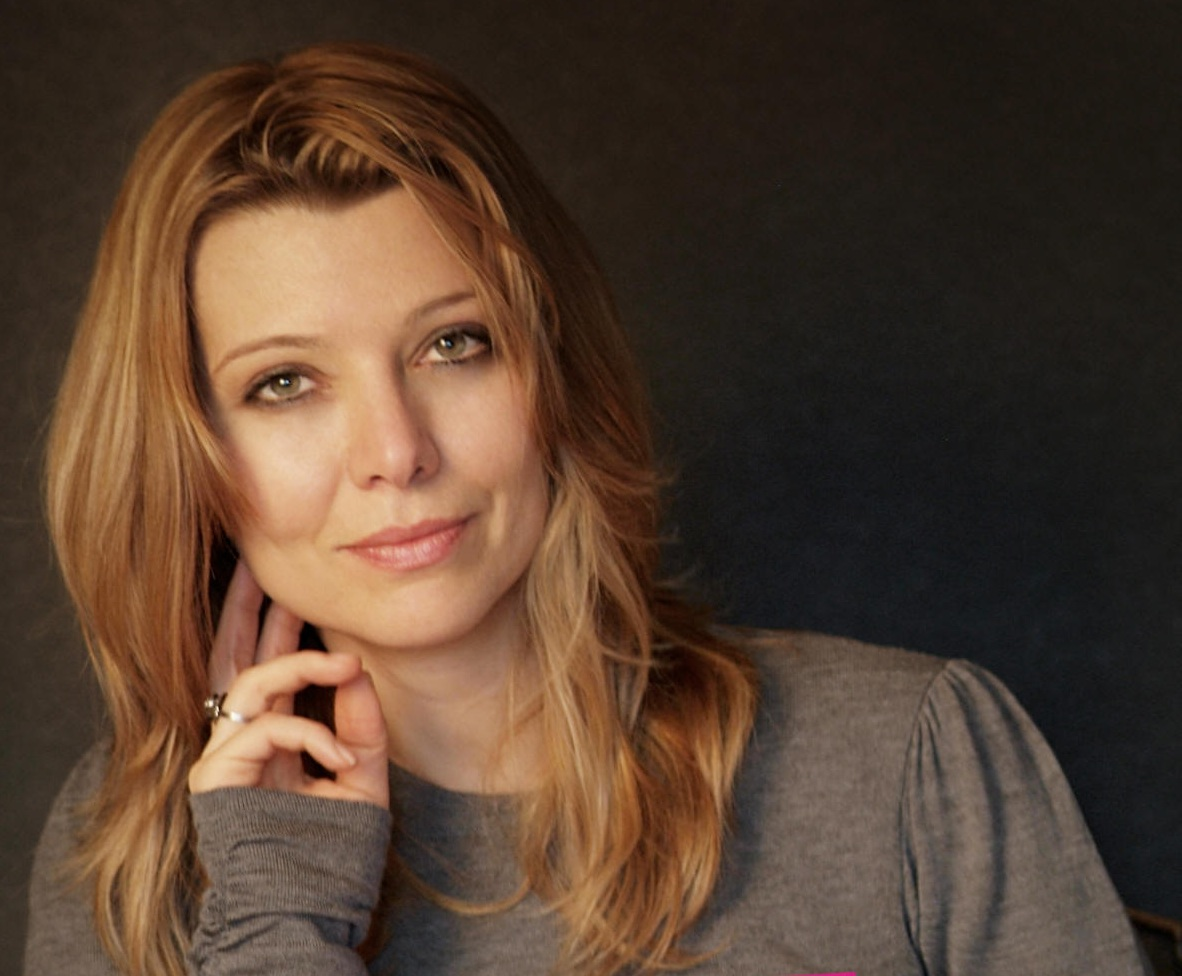
Elif Şafak
