= Aykaç =

Aykaç is a Turkish surname. Notable people with the surname include:

- Ayça Aykaç (born 1996), Turkish volleyball player
- Eşfak Aykaç (1918–2004), Turkish former football player and coach
- Fazıl Ahmet Aykaç (1884–1967), Turkish poet, educator, and politician
- Turgut Aykaç (born 1958), Turkish boxer
