= Hasibe =

Hasibe is a Turkish female given name. Notable people with the name include:

- Hasibe Çerko (born 1971), Turkish author
- Hasibe Eren (born 1975), Turkish actress
- Hasibe Erkoç (living), Turkish boxer
