= Vahdet Erdoğan =

Turkish Producer

Vahdet Erdoğan is a Turkish producer and entrepreneur.

== Biography ==
Vahdet Erdoğan graduated from the Public Relations department of Anadolu University. After completing his university education, he engaged in corporate and strategic management, social responsibility projects, advertising, organization, and political communication. After working in advertising, design, and organization fields, he founded Greenart Group.

He served as the chairman of the board of Greenart Group. He is the vice president and central delegate of the Turkish Red Crescent, a board member of the Istanbul Newspaper and Media Reporters Association, and the president of Boyabat 1868 Sports Club. At Greenart Group, he oversees Greenart Agency, Greenart Organization, Greenart Outdoor, Greenart Production, Argetus Research Company, Bizim Bölge Newspaper, Hayat Çekmeköy Magazine, and two regional newspapers. Venturing into the film industry with Greenart Production, he took on the production of the film Nasipse Olur and subsequently released the film Silbaştan Kaynanam and C Takımı.
