= Zeynep Hatun =

- Zeynünnisa
- Born: 1420? Amasya or Kastamonu
- Died: 1474 (aged 53–54); Amasya
- Resting place: Salamah Khatun
- Citizenship: Ottoman Empire
- Known for: Pioneering Divan Poetry in the Ottoman Empire
Zeynep Hatun
- Writing career
- Language: Arabic, Persian
- Genre: Divan

Zeynep Hatun (? - 1563) was the first known female Divan poet of the Ottoman Empire.

Raised in or near Amasya, Hatun received a good education, learning Arabic and Persian. Her father was a person of privilege, working as a judge. She would later move to Istanbul.

She wrote divans in service of Sultan Bayazid II and Prince Şehzade Ahmed.

Hatun wrote one divan in ode to and named after Fatih Sultan Mehmed, the father of Bayazid II, in Arabic and Persian. The divan was once in the Hagia Sophia Library under Abdul Hamid II, but it has since been lost.

Much of her poetry no longer exists. However, contemporary accounts record that her poetry often discussed wanting to be wiser or more intelligent. Her poetry also focused on gender norms (masculinity, femininity).

One of her surviving works is a gazel, which was republished in 1917.

Gazel

Keşfet nikabını yeri göğü münevver et
Bu âlem anasırı firdevs-i enver et.
Depret lebini cüşe getir hacz-i kevseri
Amber saçını çöz bu cinanı muattar et.
Hattın berat verdi saba yeline dedi
Tez er hatay'a çin'i tamam et müseehhar et.
Yâra yolunda âşk ile derdinden ölenin
Kim der sana ki hecr ile cânın mükedder et.
Zeynep çü dost zülfü gibi tarümarsın
Divane olma şiirini divan ü defter et.
Zeyneb ko meyli zinet-i dunyaya zen gibi
Merdane var sade-dil ol terk-i ziver it.

— Zeynep Hatun
Translation:
Gazel (1917 Translation)

Cast off thy veil, and heaven and earth in dazzling light array!
As radiant Paradise, this poor demented world display!
Move thou thy lips, make play the ripples light of Kevser's pool!
Let loose thy scented locks, and odors sweet through earth convey!
A musky warrant by thy down was traced, and zephyr charged:
"Speed, with this scent subdue the realms of China and Cathay!"
O heart! should not thy portion be the Water bright of Life,
A thousand times mayst thou pursue Iskender's darksome way.
O Zeyneb, woman's love of earthly show leave thou behind;
Go manly forth, with single heart, forsake adornment gay!

— Translated by Charles F. Horne (1917), Republished by istanbul Kadın Müzesi (2012)

Hatun would marry judge Qadi Ishaq Fahmi Chalabi. After marriage, Hatun withdrew from public life and the poetry community.

Hatun's divans were praised during and after her lifetime. Kınalı-zade claimed that “She has poems as perfect as men, her only shame is that she is a woman.” Writer Bursalı Mehmet Tahir Bey said she was equal to Fitnat Hanım. According to Ahmet Yassawi University and the Ministry of Culture and Tourism's the Türk Edebiyatı İsimler Sözlüğü Projesi, Hatun "was one of the important poets of her time."

== Conflicting Information ==
Most of the information known about Hatun today comes from writings by two poets Latifî (1491–1582) and Aşık Çelebi (1520–1572). Writing after her death, Latifî claimed that Hatun never married while Çelebi stated that she married Chalabi. Latifî believed Hatun was born in Amasya whereas Çelebi believed she was born in Kastamonu. Some sources also conflate Hatun with her contemporary female poet peer Mihri Hatun.

Some reports say that Hatun knew Mihri Hatun and interacted in their poetry.
