= Mehâsin =

Women's magazine in Ottoman Empire (1908–1909)

- Categories: Women's magazine
- Frequency: Monthly
- Founded: 1908
- First issue: 14 September 1908
- Final issue Number: 25 November 1909; 12
- Country: Ottoman Empire
- Based in: Istanbul
- Language: Ottoman Turkish

Mehâsin (Ottoman Turkish: Virtues) was a monthly women's magazine which was published in the Ottoman Empire between 1908 and 1909. It was one of the publications started in the aftermath of the Young Turk Revolution and was subtitled as Hanımlara Mahsus (Ottoman Turkish: For Women). It is known for being the first color women's magazine in the Empire.

== History and profile ==
The first issue of Mehâsin appeared on 14 September 1908. Its founders and directors were Asaf Muammer and Mehmed Rauf. The magazine came out monthly and was headquartered in Istanbul. In the inner cover Abdülhak Hamid's statement about women was published in each issue: "Bir milletin nisvanı derece-i terakkisinin mizanıdır.” (Ottoman Turkish: A nation's women are the measure of its modernity.).

Following its seventh issue Mehâsin temporarily ceased publication for three months due to low sales. The magazine folded on 25 November 1909 and produced twelve issues during its lifetime.

== Contributors ==
Both women and men published articles in Mehâsin. Its female contributors included Emine Semiyye, Münevver Asım, Fatma Sabiha, Fatma Aliye, Fatma Münire, Şukufe Nihal, Halide Salih, Mediha Hesna, Münire Hanım, Muhsine Hanım, Zühre Hanım and Hayriye Melek Hurç. Tevfik Fikret, Faik Ali Ozansoy, Hüseyin Suat Yalçın, Süleyman Nazif, Fazıl Ahmet Aykaç, Halid Ziya Uşaklıgil, Hüseyin Cahit Yalçın, Cenap Şahabettin and Celal Sahir also published articles in the magazine.

== Target audience and content ==
Mehâsin addressed not all Ottoman women, but only upper class educated women. It covered articles on fashion in Europe, arts, and music in addition to women's issues. In contrast to other women's periodicals such as Demet Mehâsin featured more articles on women, social and political issues. Some of the Mehâsin contributors even suggested that women could obtain their rights only by fighting. Therefore, it disseminated feminist views.

Halit Ziya's novel Ferdi ve Şürekası (Ottoman Turkish: Ferdi and His associates) was serialized in the magazine. It employed photographs produced by Western periodicals.
