= Suna Tanaltay =

Turkish writer (1933–2021)

- Born: Suna Merze; 22 April 1933; Mersin, Turkey
- Died: 5 March 2021 (aged 87)
- Education: Tevfik Sırrı Gür High School; Istanbul University
- Occupations: Writer, poet, psychologist
- Spouse: Dr. Erdoğan Tanaltay

Suna Tanaltay (22 April 1933 – 5 March 2021) was a Turkish writer, teacher, poet and psychologist.

== Life ==
Suna Merze was born to Sami and Macide in Mersin, Turkey, on 22 April 1933. Her mother, Macide, was also a wet nurse to Nevit Kodallı, the famous Turkish composer. She finished the Tevfik Sırrı Gür High School in Mersin and then graduated from the School of Psychology of Istanbul University. She also obtained certificates in History of Philosophy, Old and New Turkish literature. She served as a teacher in the Kandilli Girls' High School and the Kabataş High School both in Istanbul. Between 1958 and 1979, she served as a psychologist in the School of Medicine of Istanbul University. She was married to Dr. Erdoğan Tanaltay. The couple toured throughout Turkey to give lectures. She lived in Mersin. She was a member of the Turkish Writers' Union, Turkish Litterateurs Association, Turkish Neuropsychology Association and Mersin Poets' Association.

== Writing career ==
She began her career in literature when she was only fifteen. Her first short story İncir Ağacı ("Fig Tree") appeared in Akşam newspaper. Later, her essays and poems were published in various periodicals and newspapers. For 26 years, she made weekly radio programs. She also appeared in television channels such as Turkish Radio and Television Corporation (TRT), Star TV, Kanal 6, Kanal 9 and HBB.

== Legacy ==
Suna Tanaltay and her husband received a Certificate of Merit from the commander of the 23rd Division of the Turkish army stationed in Şırnak, southeastern Turkey. In Dikili ilçe (district) of İzmir Province and in Akçakoca ilçe of Düzce Province, the couple received the "Honorary citizen" title. In Dikili and in Balıkesir, a street is named after them.

== Books ==
Books written by Tanaltay are the following:

- Çocukluğumdan Bana Kalan ("What Remains to me from My Childhood")
- Çocuklar Ağlamasın ("Don't Let the Children Cry")
- İskambil Evler ("Houses Made of Playing Cards")
- Sevdalar Çocuk Kalır ("Love Stays Like a Child")
- Sonsuz Paylaşanlar ("Infinite Sharers")
- Yaşam Nehri ("The River of Life")
- Gençlik Sevgidir ("The Youth is Love")
- Ben Sevgiyim ("I am The Love")
- Şakayık Sokak ("Peony Street")
- Düş Sevginin Peşine ("Follow the Love")
- Gül Kokusu ("Smell of Rose")
- Sevdikçe ("As I love")
- Önce Sevgi Vardı ("In the Beginning, There Was Love")
- Kapıda Bir Gül Açtı ("A Rose Blossomed at the Door")
- Seviyorum Öylese Varım ("I Love so I Exist")
