= Birgül Ayman Güler =

Turkish academic and politician

Prof. Dr. Birgül Ayman Güler
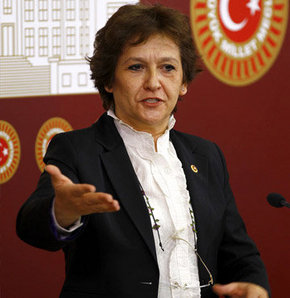
- Birgül Ayman Güler in the Parliament

Member of the Grand National Assembly
- In office 12 June 2011 – 7 June 2015
- Constituency: İzmir (II) (2011)

Personal details
- Born: 1 June 1961 (age 65) Bergama, Turkey
- Party: Independent Republican Party; Republican People's Party (CHP)
- Education: Marmara University; Faculty of Political Science, Ankara University
- Occupation: Politician, academic, civil servant, writer
- Religion: Islam

Birgül Ayman Güler (born 1 June 1961) is a Turkish academic and politician.

== Life ==
Birgül Ayman was born to İlyas and Zehra in Bergama ilçe (district) of İzmir Province, Turkey on 1 June 1961.

After obtaining her bachelor's degree in the School of Administration and Economy at Marmara University in Istanbul in 1983, she entered the Faculty of Political Sciences of Ankara University. She received both Master's and PhD degrees in Ankara University. While still in the university, she was appointed vice expert of Research and Planning Department of the Ministry of Interior in 1985. Then, she began serving in the Public Administration Institute of Turkey and Middle East (TODAİE) as an academic. In 1996, she became an associate professor, and in 2002, full professor. The same year, she transferred to Ankara University as a faculty member.

== Politics ==
According to an interview in Hürriyet newspaper, she was interested in politics while she was only 14. In 2002, she became the charter member of the Independent Republican Party (BCP). But, she later joined the Republican People's Party (CHP), and she was elected deputy from İzmir Province on 12 June 2011 for the 24th Parliament of Turkey. Although she was elected as the vice president of the party responsible in women's affairs, she later was criticized as being nationalist, and was referred to disciplinary committee of the party, upon which she resigned from the party saying "The structure I find myself in today is not the CHP I supported ideologically when I was elected Member of Parliament". She continued as an independent deputy up to the end of the 24th parliament term.

== Books ==
The books of Birgül Ayman Güler are the following:

- Ulusalcılık ve Karşıtları ("Neo-Nationalism and Its Opponents")
- Akıl Tutulması ("Eclipse of Reason")
- Yeni Sağ ve Devletin Değişimi ("New Right and the Transformation of the State")
- Yerel Yönetimler ("Local Government")
- Kamu Personeli ("Civil Servants")
- Devlette Reform Yazıları ("Essays About the Reform in the State")
- Türkiye'nin Yönetimi ("The Administration of Turkey")
- Belediyeler için Elkitabı: Personel ("Municipality Handbook: Personnel")
- Belediyeler için Elkitabı: İmar ("Municipality Handbook: Construction")
- Yerel Yönetim Sempozyum Bildirileri ("The Symposium Papers About the Local Government")
- Yerel Seçimler Panoroması 1963–1999 ("The Panorama of the Local Elections 1963–1999")
- Yerel Maliye Sistemi ("Local Government Finance System")
- Kamu Yönetimi Ülke İncelemeleri ("Local Government Research in Other Countries")
- Çöp Hizmetleri Yönetimi ("Garbage Management")
- Su Hizmetleri Yönetimi: Genel ("Water Management: In General")
- Su Hizmetleri Yönetimi: Antalya Örneği ("Water Management: Antalya Example")
