= Demet (magazine) =

Ottoman women's magazine (1908)

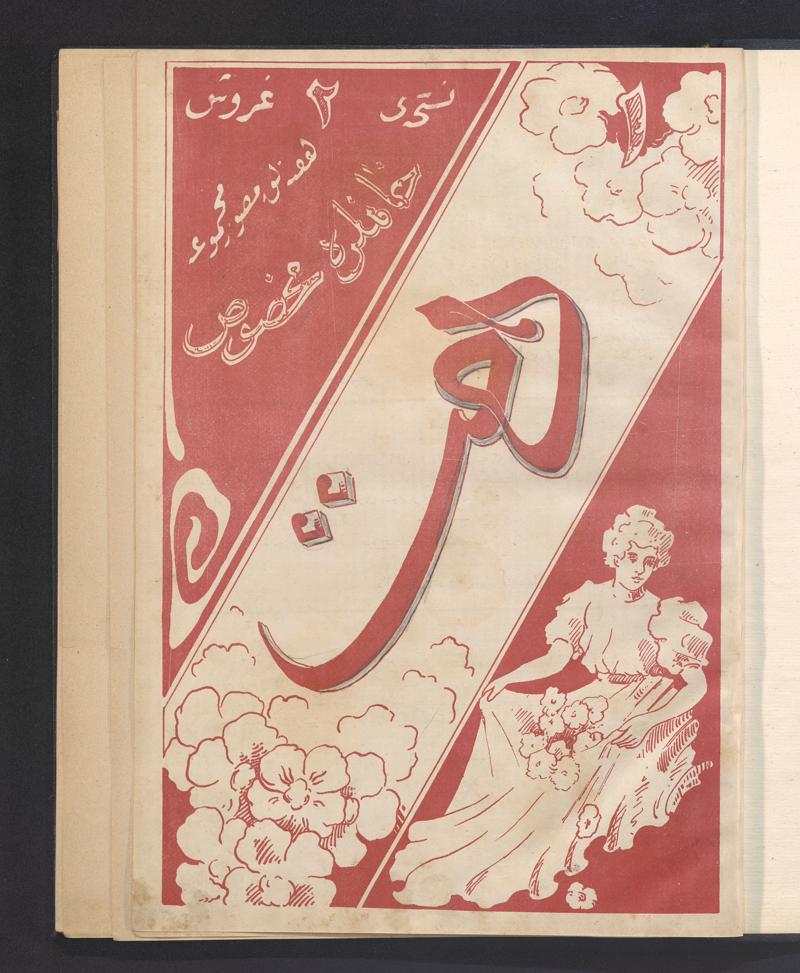
- Editor: Celāl Sāhir
- Categories: Culture · women's magazine
- Frequency: Weekly
- Founded: 1908
- Final issue: 1908
- Country: Ottoman Empire
- Based in: Istanbul
- Language: Ottoman Turkish
- Website: Demet

Demet, (Ottoman Turkish: "floral bouquet") was a short-lived but significant Ottoman women's magazine, founded in 1908 in Istanbul, two weeks after the proclamation of the Second Constitutional Era. Altogether, only seven issues exist, they were published once a week. The Editor-in-chief and publisher was Celāl Sāhir (1883–1935). Even though the magazine was aimed at women, the editorial team of the first two issues was made up exclusively of men, such as Mehmet Akif Ersoy (1873–1936), Selim Sırrı Tarcan (1874–1957), and Enis Avni (1886-1958). Among the female writers were later Halide Edib Adıvar (1884–1964), Nigar Bint-i Osman (1862–1918), and İsmet Hakkı Hanım. In addition to literary and scientific articles, what interested the female readers most were political publications. Besides Kadınlar Dünyası (1913–1921), Mehâsin (1908–1909), and Kadın (1908–1910), Demet is considered one of the first and most important women's magazines in the Second Constitutional Era.
