= Kadın Gazetesi =

Turkish weekly women's newspaper and magazine (1947–1979)

- Categories: Women's magazine
- Frequency: Weekly
- First issue: 1 March 1947
- Final issue: 1979
- Country: Turkey
- Based in: Istanbul
- Language: Turkish

Kadın Gazetesi (Turkish: Woman's Newspaper) was a weekly publication targeting women based in Istanbul, Turkey, operating from 1947 to 1979. It began as a weekly newspaper, before transitioning into a weekly magazine in 1962. It adopted a Kemalist and feminist political stance. It is one of the earliest women's publications with a clear ideology in Turkey.

== History and profile ==
Kadın Gazetesi was established in 1947 as a weekly newspaper. Its first issue appeared on 1 March that year. The founders included İffet Halim Oruz, Emel Gürler, Münevver Ayaşlı, Fürüzan Eksat, Nimet Selen and F. Elbi. İffet Halim Oruz also edited the paper which came out on Saturdays until 18 August 1947 when it began to appear on Mondays. From 13 May 1952 it was published on Thursdays. The paper was headquartered in Istanbul. Kadın Gazetesi was reformatted as a weekly magazine, and its first issue with this format appeared on 10 March 1962.

Kadın Gazetesi stated its goal in the first issue as follows: "We publish in order to serve our women’s thoughts, views, opinions, feelings, and wishes." It aimed at informing women about various topics such as politics, economy and social issues. It supported the ideology of Mustafa Kemal Atatürk. The weekly advocated the view that empowering women is equal to the development of the country. In line with this view, it featured articles in 1949 on the women's role in the Indian and Pakistani freedom movements.

Its contributors were educated and urban middle-class women, and the paper addressed women from the same social class. Major contributors of Kadın Gazetesi included Halide Nusret Zorlutuna, Hasene Ilgaz, Perihan Çambel, Cahide Üçok, Süreyya Ağaoğlu, Makbule Diblan, Lamia Onat, Kazım Nami Duru, Pakize İzzet Tarzi, Melahat Özgü, and Mualla Anıl.

The magazine folded in 1979 after publishing a total of 1125 issues.

Full issues of Kadın Gazetesi are archived in Kadın Eserleri Kütüphanesi (Turkish: Library of Women's Works) and Atatürk Kitaplığı (Turkish: Atatürk Library) in Istanbul.
