= İpek Ongun =

Turkish novelist (born 1942)

Sevim İpek Ongun
- Born: 7 January 1942 (age 84); Ankara, Turkey
- Education: Arnavutköy American High School for Girls
- Occupation: Novelist
- Spouse: Alparslan Ongun
- Children: 2
- Writing career
- Notable awards: 1991, "Golden Book" by TÜYAP 1998, "Most Successful Author

Sevim İpek Ongun (née Erden; born 7 January 1942 in Ankara) is a Turkish novelist.

She was born to Nusret Erden, an officer in Turkish Army and Fatma Aliye Erden, a literature teacher. After graduating from Arnavutköy American High School for Girls in 1961, she took courses on literary criticism in New York, United States. She began her literary career by writing for Doğan Kardeş, a children's periodical in Istanbul. She also served for Time magazine and Life magazine. As a novelist, she wrote mainly for the juveniles. In 1991, she was awarded a "Golden Book" by the Turkish trade fair organizer TÜYAP. In 1998, she was named as the "Most Successful Author". She is married and a mother of two. Currently she is living in Mersin, her husband's home city.

== Novels ==
Her novels are the following:

- Bir Genç Kızın Gizli Defteri – 1 ("Secret Diary of a Young Girl")
- Bir Genç Kızın Gizli Defteri – 2 - Arkadaşlar Arasında ("Among Friends")
- Bir Genç Kızın Gizli Defteri – 3 - Kendi Ayakları Üstünde ("Standing On Her Own Feet")
- Bir Genç Kızın Gizli Defteri – 4 - Adım Adım Hayata ("Step by Step to Life" )
- Bir Genç Kızın Gizli Defteri – 5 – İste Hayat ("That's Life")
- Bir Genç Kızın Gizli Defteri – 6 – Şimdi Düğün Zamanı ("Time for a Wedding")
- Bir Genç Kızın Gizli Defteri – 7 – Hayat Devam Ediyor ("Life Goes On")
- Bir Genç Kızın Gizli Defteri – 8 – Günler Akıp Giderken ("As the Days Pass")
- Bir Genç Kızın Gizli Defteri – 9 – Ya Sen Olmasaydın ("What If You Didn't Exist")
- Bir Genç Kızın Gizli Defteri – 10 – Taşlar Yerine Otururken ("As It All Falls into Place")
- Bir Genç Kızın Gizli Defteri – 11 – Yıllar Sonra ("After Years")
- Yaş On Yedi ("Age Seventeen")
- Kamp Arkadaşları ("Camp Friends")
- Mektup Arkadaşları ("Pen Pals")
- Afacanlar Çetesi ("The Gang of the Little Monsters")
- Mayanın Günlüğü – Güzel Bir Gün ("A Fine Day")
- Mayanın Günlüğü – İşte Benim Ailem ("That's My Family")
- Mayanın Günlüğü – Haydi Tanışalım ("Let's Meet")
- Mayanın Günlüğü – Haydi Oyuna ("Let's Play")
- Bir Pırıltıdır Yaşamak ("Life is a Glister")
- Yarım Elma Gönül Alma ("Half an Apple, Conciliation")
- Sabah Pırıltıları ("Morning Glister")
- Bu Hayat Sizin ("Life is Yours")
- Lütfen Beni Anla ("Please Understand Me")
- Duyarlı Davranışlar Yaşama Kültürü Üzerine ("On the Living Culture of Sensitive Behavior")
- Yoksa Hayat Gençken Daha mı Zor ("Is the Life More Difficult While Young")
