= Mümtaz Soysal =

Turkish politician (1929–2019)

Prof. Dr. Mümtaz Soysal MP

Minister of Foreign Affairs
- In office 27 July 1994 – 28 November 1994
- Prime Minister: Tansu Çiller
- Preceded by: Hikmet Çetin
- Succeeded by: Murat Karayalçın

Member of the Constituent Assembly as a representative of the CHP
- In office 6 January 1961 – 25 October 1961

Member of the Grand National Assembly
- In office 20 October 1991 – 22 March 1999 (resign)
- Constituency: Ankara from SHP (1991), Zonguldak from DSP (1995)

1st Chairman of the Independent Republican Party
- In office 24 July 2002 – April 2014
- Preceded by: Inaugural holder
- Succeeded by: Mühibe Müge Gülses

Personal details
- Born: Osman Mümtaz Soysal; 15 September 1929 Zonguldak, Turkey
- Died: 11 November 2019 (aged 90) Istanbul, Turkey
- Resting place: Zincirlikuyu Cemetery
- Party: Republican People's Party (CHP); Social Democratic Populist Party (SHP); Democratic Left Party (DSP); Independent Republican Party (BCP)
- Other political affiliations: Yön movement Socialist Cultural Association; Amnesty International
- Spouse(s): Sevgi Soysal (m. 1971; died 1976) Sevinç Karasapan Soysal
- Children: 2
- Education: Galatasaray High School
- Alma mater: Mekteb-i Mülkiye; Ankara University, Law School
- Occupation: Constitution writing, conflict resolution, foreign policy, human rights, statism, anti-privatisation
- Profession: Academic, jurist, politician, author
- Awards: UNESCO Prize for Human Rights Education (1978)

Osman Mümtaz Soysal (15 September 1929 – 11 November 2019) was a Turkish professor of constitutional law, political scientist, politician, human rights activist, ex-prisoner of conscience, senior advisor, columnist, and author.

Soysal served as the 30th Minister of Foreign Affairs in 1994. He was a Member of Parliament at Constituent Assembly in 1961 and Grand National Assembly from 1991 to 1999.

He actively contributed to the constitutions of Turkey (1961) and the DR Congo (2006). He was constitutional advisor of the President of Northern Cyprus Rauf Denktaş.

He was elected to Amnesty International International Executive Committee in September 1974 as the first Turkish and the first ex-prisoner of conscience member ever. He served as the vice-chairman of Amnesty International from 1976 to 1978. He became the first winner of the UNESCO Prize for Human Rights Education in 1978.

As a hard-line Kemalist statist, Mümtaz Soysal persistently worked against privatisation policies and initiatives of Turkish governments, especially in the 1990s. He founded Center for Development of Public Enterprise in April 1994, and the organisation was converted to a foundation in 1996.

Mümtaz Soysal was member of the Republican People's Party, the Social Democratic Populist Party and the Democratic Left Party. In 2002, he founded the Independent Republican Party with many academics and served as the first chairman of the party from 2002 to 2014.

== Early life and career ==
He was born on 15 September 1929 in Zonguldak, Turkey to Osman Muhtar, a naval kol aghassi and his wife Samiye. He graduated from Galatasaray High School and went in to the Ankara University where he earned degrees from the Faculty of Political Science, also known as SBF, and the law faculty.

Soysal became a professor of constitutional law at Ankara University. He then entered the Constituent Assembly of Turkey after the 1960 military coup and helped write the Turkish Constitution of 1961.

Soysal became involved in left-wing politics as one of the founders of Yön, a left-wing political magazine founded in 1961. He also became the dean of SBF, which was known at the time for its leftist politics.

== Arrest ==
The 1971 military coup ended his tenure as dean and later led to his detention. He was also the editor-in-chief of a newly founded weekly political magazine, Ortam, when he was arrested. He was arrested and charged with making communist propaganda. For this, he was sentenced to six years and eight months in prison and a lifetime ban from public office. He served just over 14 months of the sentence and later received a pardon. For his detention, he was listed as an Amnesty International prisoner of conscience. In 1974, he became the first former prisoner of conscience to serve on the International Executive Committee of Amnesty International. He served on the organization’s board until 1976, becoming its vice chairman.

== Later career ==
In 1991, as a member of the Social Democratic Populist Party he won election to the Grand National Assembly in coalition with Prime Minister Süleyman Demirel’s True Path Party. He was a critic of government policies as a member of the assembly. He was appointed Minister of Foreign Affairs by Prime minister Tansu Çiller but resigned only four months later.

Soysal wrote columns for the daily Milliyet between 1974 and 1991, for Hürriyet between 1991 and 2001, and for Cumhuriyet after 2001.

== Personal life ==
He was married to Sevgi Soysal (until her death in 1976). Later he married Sevinç Karasapan Soysal who was the daughter of Celal Tevfik Karasapan. He had two daughters, Defne (1973) and Funda (1975) and two step-sons.

Mümtaz Soysal died at the age of 90 on 11 November 2019 at his home in Beşiktaş, Istanbul, Turkey. He was interred at Zincirlikuyu Cemetery following the religious funeral service at Zincirlikuyu Mosque.

Political offices
Preceded by Hikmet Çetin	Minister of Foreign Affairs of Turkey; 27 July 1994–28 November 1994	Succeeded by Murat Karayalçın
Party political offices
Preceded by Inaugural holder	Leader of the Independent Republican Party (BCP); 24 July 2002–16 May 2014	Succeeded by Mühibe Müge Gülses
