= İsmet Kür =

Turkish educator, journalist, columnist and writer (1916-2013)

- Born: İsmet Zorluhankızı; 29 September 1916; Göztepe, Kadıköy, Istanbul, Ottoman Empire
- Died: 21 January 2013 (aged 96); Istanbul, Turkey
- Resting place: Ayazağa Cemetery, Istanbul
- Education: Gazi Institute for Education; New York University
- Occupations: Educator, journalist, writer
- Children: Pınar Kür, Işılar Kür
- Relatives: Halide Nusret Zorlutuna (sister)
- Writing career
- Language: Turkish
- Genre: Children's literature

İsmet Kür (born Zorluhankızı, 29 September 1916 – 21 January 2013) was a Turkish educator, journalist, columnist and writer of mainly children's literature. Her writings included children's stories, novels, memoirs, short story, poems, and non-fiction. As a journalist, she worked at the BBC World Service, Cumhuriyet, Barış, and Yeni İstanbul. She also provided programming at Ankara Radio, TRT, and Bayrak.

== Personal life ==
İsmet Kür was born on 29 September 1916 in Göztepe, Kadıköy, in Constantinople, Ottoman Empire (now Istanbul, Turkey), in a mansion frequented by writers and poets. Her father Avnullah Kazim was a journalist, writer and politician, and her mother Ayşe Nazlı was an intellectual. Her sister Halide Nusret Zorlutuna (1901–1984) was a poet and writer. After the Surname Law went into effect in 1934, she took the family name "Zorluhankızı", meaning the "daughter of Zorluhan" because her name "İsmet" is mainly used for males, and caused confusion. Her father's ancestry of 6th to 7th generations was a Bey, a chieftain of Zorluhan in Erzurum Province, eastern Turkey.

After graduation from the Girls' Teacher School in Edirne, she studied in the Literature Department of Gazi Institute for Education (Turkish: Gazi Eğitim Enstitüsü) in Ankara, obtaining a teacher's degree in 1938.

She was married to a mathematician, who admired classical music and painting. By this marriage, she took the surname "Kür". She gave birth to two daughters, journalist and writer Pınar Kür (born 1943) and sculptor Işılar Kür. She has a grandson Emrah Kolukısa (born 1972), who is a program producer at the NTV television channel, the son of Pınar Kür and the father of her great-grandson Cem.

Kür went with her two young daughters to London to learn the English language on a scholarship. In 1953, she attended the Kent School of Drama. She also lived in New York City with her children from 1956 to 1960 . There, she attended in 1960 courses at New York University on children's and youth psychology, adult education, human relations, history of education and 19th-century Russian literature.

During her time in the U.S., she founded the "Women's Association" with the spouse of the Turkish Ambassador.

She said in an interview that she owed her very old age to her practicing tennis, volleyball, skiing, and gymnastics, and exercising every morning. In September 2012, she contracted cerebral infarction, and became bedridden. She died at home on 21 January 2013 at the age of 96. She was interred at Ayazağa Cemetery following a religious funeral service held at Teşvikiye Mosque on 23 January.

== Professional career ==
Educator and diplomat

Kür served as a school teacher of Turkish language and Literature for 21 years. In the 1950s, she worked at the BBC World Service in London. In 1956, she was appointed Deputy Student inspector for the United States territory, and was subsequently promoted to the post of Student Inspector in New York City. She also served as the Turkish Attaché of Culture there until 1960.

Journalist

She was a long-time journalist at Cumhuriyet. She worked as a columnist at the newspapers Barış and Yeni İstanbul.

Writer

Kür was a friend of many authors, particularly Kemal Tahir (1910–1973). She was the author of 27 books in the genres of research, essay, short story, poem, novel. and memoir. She also wrote sketches for radio and plays. She published her first poem in the periodical Çocuk Dünyası ("Child's World") in 1927, and her first short story Mutlu Tahayüller in the periodical Muhit in August 1931.

She wrote more than 100 sketches for the "Çocuk Saati" ( "Children's Hour") program at Ankara Radio. She also did children's programs for the radio stations TRT in Turkey and Bayrak in the Turkish Republic of Northern Cyprus.

She published her memoirs in Yarısı Roman (1995) and Yıllara mı Çarptı Hızımız (2008). Osmanlıca Çocuk Dergileri is a research work of hers on the children's magazines in Ottoman Turkish language, which made her well-known. She continued writing until her death.

Kür was a member of the "People of the Letters Association" and the "Turkish Union of Writers".

== Works ==
Children's

- Mutlu ve Zorlu Yıllar - Coşkun'un Serüvenleri (in Turkish). Can Yayınları. 2017. p. 144. ISBN 978-975-071-202-9.
- Bilinmeyene Yolculuk / Coşkun'un Serüvenleri -2 (in Turkish). Can Yayınları. 2013. p. 168. ISBN 978-975-071-597-6.
- Kardan Çocuk ve Küçük Kara Köpek (in Turkish). Bu Yayınevi. 2011. p. 72. ISBN 978-605-356-007-4.
- Mavi'nin Serüvenleri 3/ Sokak Köpeği (in Turkish). Bu Yayınevi. 9 June 2000. p. 160. ISBN 978-605-549-632-6.
- Mavi'nin Serüvenleri 2 / Yeni Dostlar Arasında (in Turkish). Bu Yayınevi. 2011. p. 160. ISBN 978-605-549-631-9.
- Mavi'nin Serüvenleri 1/ Eski Ev (in Turkish). Bu Yayınevi. 9 June 2000. p. 160. ISBN 978-605-549-630-2.
- Ne Güzel Şey (in Turkish). Bu Yayınevi. 2006. p. 65. ISBN 978-994-437-643-3.

Novels

- Onuncu Sigara (in Turkish). Everest Yayınları. 2007. p. 203. ISBN 978-975-289-418-1.
- Karvera Nereye (in Turkish). Bu Yayınları. 2001. p. 304. ISBN 978-975-602-264-1.
- Karvera (in Turkish). Bu Yayınları. 1999. p. 248. ISBN 978-975-565-245-0.

Memoirs

- Yarısı Roman (in Turkish). Everest Yayınları. 2011. p. 433. ISBN 978-975-289-320-7.
- Anılarla Mustafa Kemal Atatürk (in Turkish). Alfa Yayınları. 2010. p. 136. ISBN 978-975-297-924-6.
- Yıllara mı Çarptı Hızımız (in Turkish). Everest Yayınları. 2008. p. 305. ISBN 978-975-289-558-4.

Short story

- Kocaman Bir Örümcektir Zaman (in Turkish). Gerçek Sanat Yayınları. 2001. p. 94. ISBN 978-975-360-174-0.

Non-fiction

- Almanya'daki Çocuklarımızın Başarısızlık Nedenleri
- Türkiye'de Süreli Çocuk Yayınları (in Turkish). Atatürk Kültür Merkezi Yayınları. 1991. p. 601. ISBN 978-975-160-346-3.
- Çiçekler Sevgiyle Bütür (in Turkish). Akbank Yayınları. 1989.
- Anneler Sizin İçin (1964)

Poems

- 99. Kat Şiirleri (in Turkish). Everest Yayınları. 2005. p. 80. ISBN 978-975-289-266-8.
- Yaşamak (1945)
