= Azmiye Hami Güven =

Turkish novelist

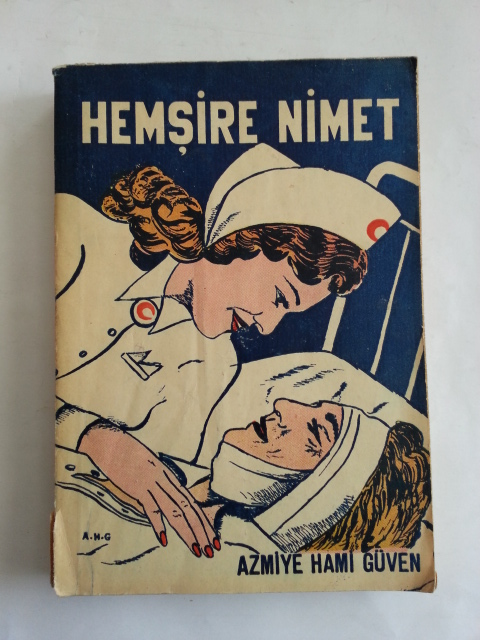
Hemsire Nimet (1951)

Azmiye Hami Güven (1904, Konya - 1954, Ankara) was a Turkish novelist. A graduate of the Kandilli Kız Lisesi, she was one of the first Turkish woman writers of the Republican period. She is best known for Hemșire Nimet (Nimet, the Nurse) 1951.
