= Emine Semiye Önasya =

Turkish writer, activist and feminist (1864–1944)

- Born: 28 March 1864; Istanbul, Ottoman Empire
- Died: 1944 (aged 79–80); Istanbul, Turkey
- Occupations: Novelist, columnist, essayist
- Relatives: Ahmed Cevdet Pasha (father); Fatma Aliye (sister)
- Writing career
- Pen name: Emine Vahide
- Subject: Women's rights
- Literary movement: Feminism

Emine Semiye Önasya (28 March 1864 – 1944), mostly known as Emine Semiye and Emine Vahide, was a Turkish writer, teacher, activist, and early feminist. She thought that education plays an important role in the emancipation of women.

Like her sister, Fatma Aliye, she was a pioneer female novelist of not only the Ottoman but the Islamic world. Her last novel, Gayya Kuyusu, or Pit of Hell, is a savage indictment of Turkish society. It is available in an English translation by WD Halsey.

== Early life and education ==
Emine Semiye was born in Istanbul on 28 March 1864. She was the second daughter of Ahmed Cevdet Pasha and sister of Fatma Aliye. Her mother was Adviye Rabia Hanım. Emine Semiye studied psychology and sociology in France and Switzerland for seven years. She was one of the first Ottoman Muslim women educated in Europe.

== Career and activities ==
From 1882 Emine Semiye worked as a Turkish and literature teacher in Istanbul and in other provinces. She served as an inspector at girls’ schools and an assistant nurse at Şişli Etfal Hospital. Her writings on politics and education were published in various publications, including Mütalaa (in Thessalonica), Mehâsin (Ottoman Turkish: Virtues) and Hanımlara Mahsus Gazete (Ottoman Turkish: Newspaper for Women) after the declaration of the constitutional monarchy in 1908. She also wrote a math textbook entitled Hulasa-i Ilm-i Hesap in 1893. In Hanımlara Mahsus Gazete she used first several pseudonyms, but later used her name and published various stories and travel writings. Her most-known novels are Sefalet (1908) (Ottoman Turkish: Poverty) and Gayya Kuyusu (Ottoman Turkish: The Pit of Hell).

Emine Semiye established several charity organizations to help women. One of them was Şefkât-i Nisvân (Ottoman Turkish: Women’s Compassion) which was established in Thessalonica in 1898. Another charity founded by her was Hizmet-i Nisvân Cemiyeti (Ottoman Turkish: Service of Women Association).

In late 1890s Emine Semiye was the head of the Union and Progress Women’s Revolution Committee in Thessalonica. She became a member of the progressive Committee of Union and Progress (CUP) and later, of the Ottoman Democratic Party. At the beginning of the revolution of 1908 she initiated a demonstration in Freedom Square in Thessalonica holding a flag. Soon after many people both men and women joined her. In 1920, she was named a member of the governing board of the Turkish Journalists' Association which had been called the Ottoman Press Association until that year. She went into exile in Paris to avoid arrest by the Ottoman authorities due to her CUP membership. Later she returned to Turkey and worked as a teacher.

=== Views ===
Emine Semiye, together with her older sister Fatma Aliye, was a significant figure for the Ottoman women movement. Emine Semiye was much more progressive and less orthodox than her sister. She supported an image of women, educated mothers and wives, imposed by the official discourse during the rule of Sultan Abdul Hamid II. During the same period she argued in an article published in Hanımlara Mahsus Gazete that the reason for her writing career was to contribute to social development, not for women's development.

Although Emine Semiye actively involved in the activities of the CUP, her affiliation with the group weakened when she realized that the CUP was not very enthusiastic in improving women's rights.

== Personal life and death ==
Emine Semiye married twice. Her first husband was Mustafa Bey who was a military judge. The second was Reşid Pasha. They divorced later. She had two sons; one from each husband. Their names were Hasan Riza, son of Mustafa Bey and Cevdet Lagaş, son to Reşid Pasha. She died in Istanbul in 1944.
