= Fatma Aliye Topuz =

Turkish writer and activist (1862–1936)

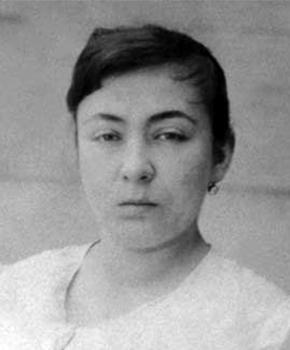
- Born: 9 October 1862; Istanbul, Ottoman Empire
- Died: 13 July 1936 (aged 73); Istanbul, Turkey
- Occupations: Novelist, columnist, essayist
- Relatives: Ahmet Cevdet Pasha (father); Emine Semiye (sister)
- Writing career
- Pen name: Bir Hanım (A Lady), Mütercime-i Meram (Translator of Meram)
- Period: 1889–1915
- Subject: Women's rights
- Notable works: Muhadarat (1892), Udi (1899)

Fatma Aliye Topuz (9 October 1862 – 13 July 1936), often known simply as Fatma Aliye or Fatma Aliye Hanım, was a Turkish novelist, columnist, essayist, women's rights activist and humanitarian. Although there was an earlier published novel by the Turkish female author Zafer Hanım in 1877, since that one remained her only novel, Fatma Aliye Hanım with her five novels is credited by literary circles as the first female novelist in Turkish literature and the Islamic world.

== Early life ==
Fatma Aliye was born in Istanbul on 9 October 1862. She was the second child of the leading Ottoman civil servant, renowned historian and bureaucrat Ahmed Cevdet Pasha (1822–1895) and his wife Adviye Rabia Hanım. She had two siblings: a brother Ali Sedat and a sister Emine Semiye.

Due to her father's position as wali (English: province governor) to Egypt and later to Greece, she spent three years from 1866 to 1868 in Aleppo and six months in 1875 in Janina. In 1878, she stayed together with her family for nine months in Damascus, where her father was posted.

Fatma Aliye was educated informally at home, since, at that time, it was not common for girls to enroll in formal classes even though there was no legal restriction on female education. Through her intellectual curiosity she acquired a high level of proficiency in Arabic and French.

In 1879, when she was seventeen years old, her father arranged her marriage to captain-major (Ottoman Turkish: Kolağası) Mehmet Faik Bey, an aide-de-camp of Sultan Abdul Hamid II and a nephew of Gazi Osman Pasha, the hero of the Siege of Plevna (1877). She gave birth to four daughters: Hatice (born 1880), Ayşe (born 1884), Nimet (born 1900) and Zübeyde İsmet (born 1901).

Her husband was a person intellectually less endowed than her, and during the first years of their marriage, did not allow her to read novels in foreign languages.

== Writing career ==
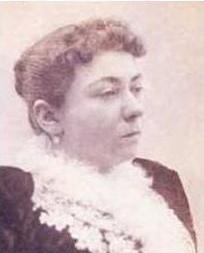
Fatma Aliye Topuz was one of the first women's rights activists, appearing in Western clothing throughout her public life

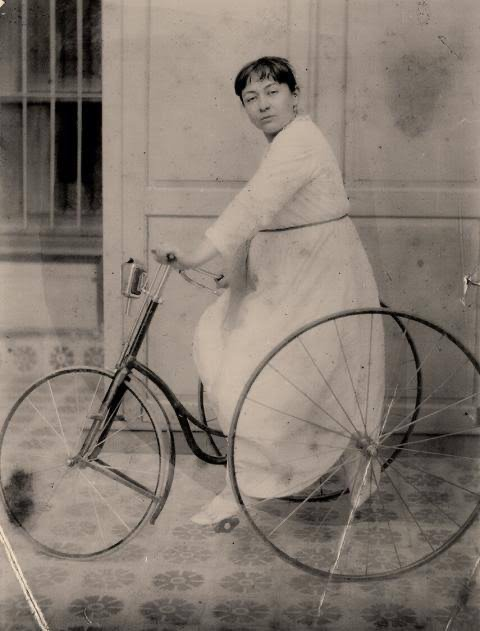
Fatma Aliye Topuz riding a tricycle, apparently while pregnant, circa 1900

She debuted in literature in 1889 with the translation of Georges Ohnet's novel Volonté from French into Turkish under the title Meram with her husband's permission, ten years after her marriage. The book was published under her pen name "Bir Hanım" ("A Lady"). Renowned writer Ahmet Mithat was so impressed by her writing that he declared her as his honorary daughter in the newspaper Tercüman-ı Hakikat ("The Interpreter of Truth"). Fatma Aliye attracted also her father's attention so that he lectured her and exchanged ideas with her. After her first translation, she used the pen name "Mütercime-i Meram" (literally: "The female translator of Volonté) in her consecutive translations.

In 1894, she co-authored the novel Hayal ve Hakikat ("Dream and Truth") together with Ahmet Mithat Efendi. She wrote the passages for the heroine while the passages for the male character was penned by Ahmet Mithat. The work was signed with "Bir Kadın ve Ahmet Mithat" ("A Woman and Ahmet Mithat"). Following this novel, the two authors exchanged a long time letters with each other, which were published later in the newspaper Tercüman-ı Hakikat.

Fatma Aliye published her first novel Muhazarat ("Useful Information") in 1892 under her real name, in which she tried to disprove the belief that a woman can not forget her first love. It was the first novel in the entire Ottoman Empire written by a woman. The book was reprinted in 1908.

Her third novel Udi ("The Lute Player"), published in 1899, depicts a female oud player, whom Fatma Aliye met in Aleppo. In this novel, she tells, in a plain language, the life story of Bedia, who made an unhappy marriage. The renowned novelist Reşat Nuri Güntekin refers to Udi as one of the most important works which attracted his interest in literature. It is available in an English translation by WD Halsey.

Her other novels are Raf'et (1898), Enin (1910) ("Groaning") and Levaih-i Hayat ("Scenes from Life"). She thematized in her works marriage, harmony between the spouses, love and affection, and the importance of curtailing contrary to arranged marriage. Further, she picked individualism out as a central theme by creating independent and self-reliant heroines, who work and earn own money without the need of a man.

In 1893, her prominence grew up after the publication of Ahmet Mithat's book Bir Muharrire-i Osmaniye'nin Neşeti ("Birth of An Ottoman Female Writer") composed of Fatma Aliye's letters. In these letters, she expresses her never ending enthusiasm to learn.

Her essay Nisvan-ı İslâm was translated into French under the title Les femmes muselmannes by Olga Lebedeva and also into Arabic language, and her novel Udi into French. A criticism of her, published in a French newspaper, about a book titled "Women of East and West" by Frenchman Émile Julliard attracted much attention in Paris. Also internationally acknowledged, her work was exhibited at the library of the 1893 World's Columbian Exposition in Chicago, United States and was listed in the catalogue of the Women's Library at the fair. Despite her prominence until the Second Constitutional Era, she fell into oblivion with the time.

In 1914, she published her book Ahmed Cevdet Paşa ve Zamanı ("Ahmet Cevdet Pasha and His Time") in order to defend her father against political attacks. In this work, she intended to present the political scene after the Second Constitutional Era. However, its controversy to the official historical thesis led to the book's exclusion from the literature.

== Women's rights activist ==
Beside her literary works, she wrote for thirteen years between 1895 and 1908 columns in the magazine Hanımlara Mahsus Gazete ("Ladies' Own Gazette") about women's rights without giving up her conservative views. Her sister Emine Semiye Önasya (1864–1944), one of the first Turkish feminists, was also among the intellectual women as editorial staff of the twice a week issued magazine. They also contributed to Mehâsin which was started after the Young Turk Revolution in 1908.

In her 1896 published book Nisvan-i Islam ("Women of Islam"), Fatma Aliye explained the situation of Muslim women to the western world. As written in her magazine columns, she defended in this book the conservative traditions contrary to the modern characters she created in her novels.

== Humanitarian ==
Fatma Aliye was also engaged in charity. After the Greco-Turkish War, she founded in 1897 a charitable organization "Nisvan-ı Osmaniye İmdat Cemiyeti" (Ottoman Women's Association for Aid) to support families of soldiers. It was one of the first women's organizations in the country. For her humanitarian efforts, she was awarded the Order of Charity (Şefkat Nişanı) by Sultan Abdul Hamid II in 1899.

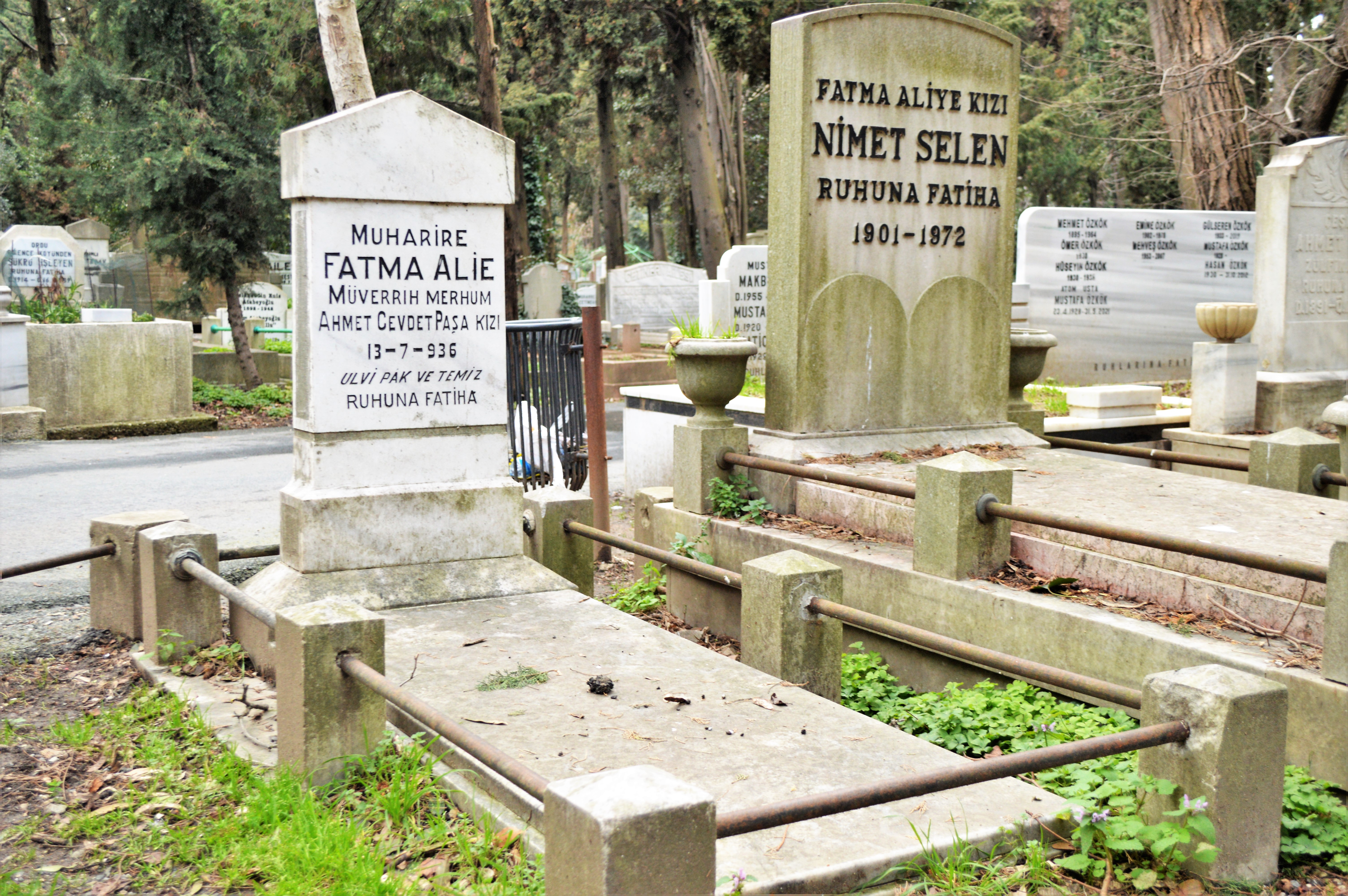
Grave of Fatma Aliye Topuz in Feriköy Cemetery, Istanbul

Fatma Aliye became also the first female member of the "Osmanlı Hilal-i Ahmer Cemiyeti" (Ottoman Red Crescent). Furthermore, she worked for the "Müdafaa-i Milliye Osmanlı Kadınlar Heyeti" (Ottoman Women's Committee for National Defence), founded after the Italo-Turkish War and Balkan Wars in the 1910s.

== Last years ==
Her youngest daughter Zübeyde İsmet converted to Christianity in 1926 and left Turkey to become a Roman Catholic nun. Fatma Aliye travelled in the 1920s several times to France in search of her daughter and also for her own health reasons. In 1928, she lost her husband. Fatma Aliye adopted the family name "Topuz" after the introduction of the Surname Law in Turkey, which was enacted on 21 June 1934. Having lived her last years in poor health and financial distress, she died on 13 July 1936 in Istanbul. She was laid to rest at the Feriköy Cemetery.

== Recognition and controversy ==
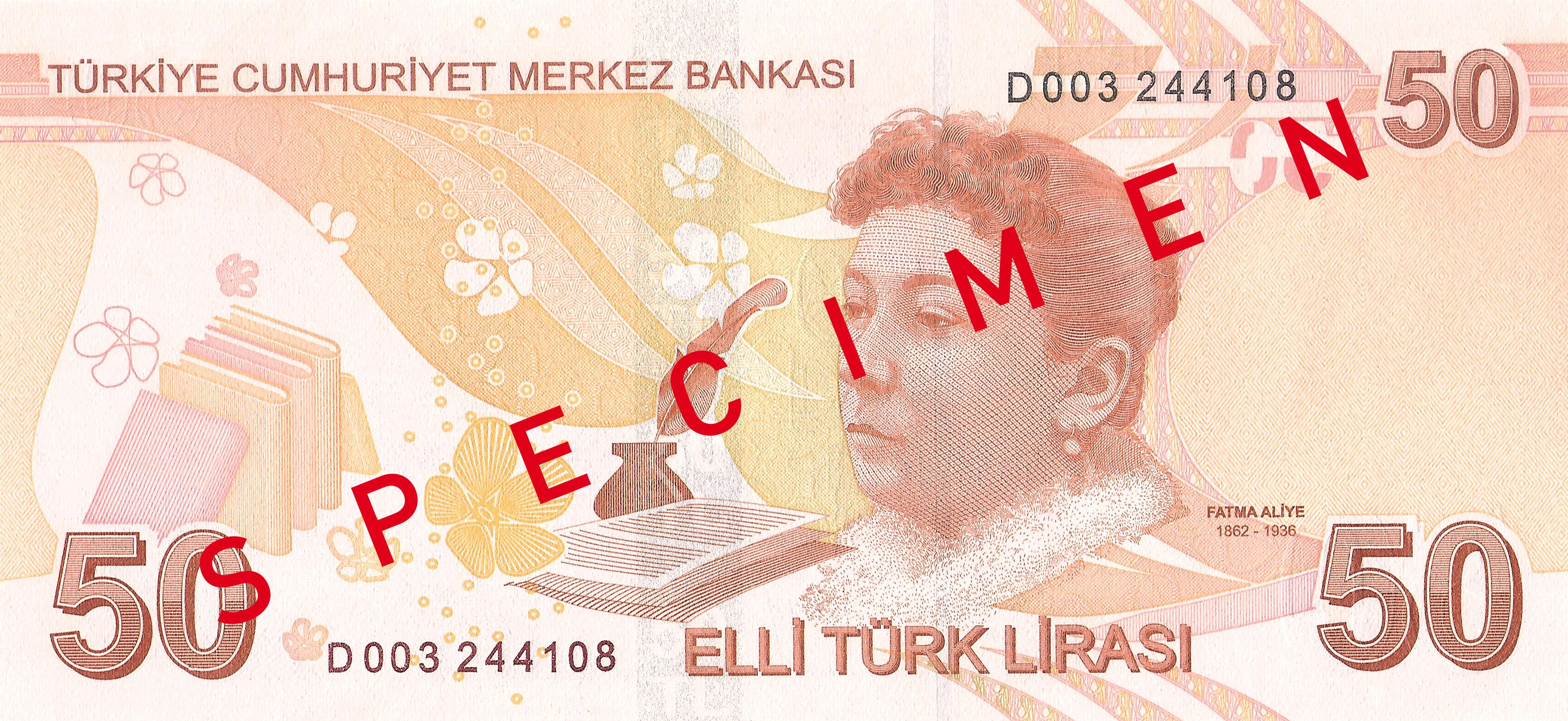
Reverse of the 50 lira banknote (2009)

Although Zafer Hanım wrote her novel Aşk-ı Vatan ("Motherland Love") in 1877, years before Fatma Aliye Hanım, she is not credited as the first Turkish female writer due to her only one work published.

Fatma Aliye's portrait is depicted on the reverse of the 50 Turkish lira banknote issued in 2009. However, the Turkish Central Bank's decision to choose her to appear as the first woman ever so honored and as the first female Turkish writer created controversy among Turkish people of letters and historians. The critics argued that female writers like Halide Edib Adıvar or Afet İnan of the Republican Era are more appropriate to adorn a banknote with Atatürk's portrait on the obverse than is Fatma Aliye, who developed her ideas of women's rights in the context of sharia (Islamic law) and who opposed Atatürk's reforms.

== Selected works ==
=== Novels ===
- Muhazarat (1892) ("Useful Information")
- Hayal ve Hakikat (1894) ("Dream And Truth")
- Raf'et (1898)
- Udi (1899) ("The Lute Player")
- Enin (1910) ("Groaning")
- Levaih-i Hayat ("Scenes from Life")

=== Translation ===
- Meram (1890) from French, Georges Ohnet's novel Volonté (1888)

=== Essays ===
- Namdaran-ı Zenan-ı İslamıyan (1895) ("Famous Muslim Women")
- Osmanlıda Kadın: "Cariyelik, Çokeşlilik, Moda" (1895) ("Women in the Ottoman Empire: 'Odalisque, Polygamy, Fashion'")
- With Mahmud Esad, Taaddüd-i Zevcat ("Polygamy")
- Nisvan-ı İslam (1896) ("Women of Islam") French translation Les femmes muselmannes
- Teracim-i Ahval-ı Felasife (1900) ("Biographies of Philosophers") (2006) Çizgi Kitabevi, Konya. Reprint. 153 pages ISBN 975-8867-84-9
- Tedkik-i Ecsam (1901) ("Research on Objects")
- Ahmed Cevdet Paşa ve Zamanı (1914) ("Ahmet Cevdet Pasha And His Time")
- Kosova Zaferi / Ankara Hezimeti: Tarih-i Osmaninin Bir Devre-i Mühimmesi (1915) ("Victory in Kosovo / Defeat in Ankara: An Important Era of the Ottoman History")

== Bibliography ==
- Ahmed Midhat. Fatma Aliye Hanım yahud Bir Muharrire-i Osmaniye'nin Neşeti (1893) (Lady Fatma Aliye or the Birth of An Ottoman Writer) Translated from Ottoman Turkish by Bedia Ermat. Reprint (1994) Sel Yayıncılık, Istanbul. 96p. ISBN 975-570-009-9
- Barbarosoğlu, Fatma Karabıyık. Fatma Aliye: Far Country - First Female Writer of the Muslim World Timas Publishing. A novel based upon her life story.
- Çakır, Serpil, A Biographical Dictionary of Women's Movements and Feminisms - Central, Eastern and South Eastern Europe, 19th and 20th Centuries - Aliye, Fatma (1862–1936). pp. 21–24. (2006) Central European University Press, edited by Francisca de Haan, Krassimira Daskolova and Anna Loutfi. 678 p. ISBN 963-7326-39-1 ISBN 9789637326394
- Frierson, Elizabeth B., Late Ottoman society - The Intellectual Legacy - Women in Late Ottoman intellectual history. pp. 135–161 (2005) Routledge, edited by Elisabeth Özdalga. 348 p. ISBN 0-415-34164-7 ISBN 9780415341646
- Mende-Altayli, Rana von (2010) ed.: Fatima Aliyye / Mahmud Esad: Ta'addüd-i Zevcat Zeyl – Continuation of the Debate on Polygamy. A Modern Turkish Version, Transcription and Facsimile. With an introduction by Rana v. Mende-Altayli. 177 p. Berlin: Klaus Schwarz, ISBN 978-3-87997-376-7
