= Güzide Sabri Aygün =

Turkish writer

Güzide Sabri Aygün (1886–1946) was a Turkish writer known for her romance novels, which were published in multiple editions and several languages.

== Private life ==
Güzife Sabri was born to Salih reşat, a civil servant at the Ottoman Justice Ministry, and his spouse Nigar in Fındıklı quarter of Istanbul, then Ottoman Empire in 1886. She had two sisters, Fatma Aliye and Emine Semiye. She grew up in Çamlica neighborhood of Istanbul. In later years, she had to leave Istanbul and move to Anatolia with her family as her father was exiled, resulted from his opposition to the despotism of Ottoman Sultan Abdul Hamid II (reigned 1876–1909).

At a young age, she was married to Ahmet Sabri Aygün, the first notary of Beyoğlu.

== Education and writing career ==
She was educated at home by special tutors. She was interested in literature, inspired by her teacher Hodja Tahir Effendi, a dictionary writer. She started to write in her very young age. However, her teachers proposed her to better deal with the religious matters instead of poetry. Contrary to the pressures of her literature teacher, she wrote her first novel Münevver in her youth years in 1899. She wrote the novel in remembrance of her friend, who died from tuberculosis. It was serialized in the newspaper Hanımlara Mahsus ("For Ladies"), and won well recognition. In 1901, two years later, the novel was published as book, and was also translated into Serbian language.

Her husband felt discomfort by his wife's prominence. As her teachers' reaction was not enough, her husband also objected to her writing. However, her enthusiasm could not deter her from writing. It is understood that her husband tried to prevent her writing as he did not allow her to write already at the wedding. She was forced to continue writing at night or secretly. After a short time, her husband died. The unexpected death of her husband left deep traces in her. Güzide Sabri became a female writer, who remained lifelong unhappy having a sad life in the literature history.

During this time, the Servet-i Fünun ("Wealth of Knowledge") movement, formed by Recaizade Mahmud Ekrem (1847–1914) and his students, left its mark on the literature. Güzide Sabri was one of the authors, who did not join the movement, and remained on their own line. She is considered as one of the first female novelist among the Turkish writers with widespread fame, even though she was not involved in the new literary movement. She published her works in the Servet-i Fünun and other journals of the "National Literature" without being a member of any literary community.

Her novels, which were written in the early years of the Second Constitutional Era (1908–1918) and the Republican era (from 1922), and were subject of feeling, dream, blind love and broken hearts, were very popular, and had multiple editions and were repeatedly filmed. Her second novel Ölmüş Bir Kadının Evrak-ı Metrûkesi ("Derelict Documents of a Dead Woman") was a bestseller. It was first published in 1901, reprinted several times and was filmed twice, in 1956 and then in 1969. The novel was translated into Armenian language. She authored romance novels for simple readers. She is considered as the author writing the first examples of the so-called mass-market romance novels, and pioneer of the broken-hearts novels in her country. Her 1930-novel Hicran Gecesi ("Night of Sorrow") is about the forbidden love of a bad woman. This book takes the romance novel one step forward in forbidden, impossible love story. Her novels, which take place in Istanbul, attracted interest of readers outside of big cities like Istanbul and İzmir as well.

== Works ==
- Münevver (1901) 14 editions(1903–1942) in 5 languages
- Ölmüş Bir Kadının Evrak-ı Metrûkesi (1905) 13 editions (1921–2010) in 4 languages
- Nedret (1922) 11 editions (1923–1941) in 4 languages
- Yaban Gülü (1926) 12 editions (1921–1945) in 4 languages
- Hüsran (1928) 9 editions (1928–938) in 3 languages
- Hicran Gecesi (1930)
- Gecenin Esrarı (1934)
- Necla (1941) 3 editions (938–1945)
- Mazinin Sesi (1944)
