= Independent Republican Party (Turkey) =

Independent Republican Party Bağımsız Cumhuriyet Partisi
- Abbreviation: BCP
- President: Hakkı Karğın
- Secretary-General: Ateş Çehreli
- Founder: Mümtaz Soysal
- Founded: 24 July 2002
- Dissolved: 21 February 2026
- Headquarters: Bayındır 1. Sokak 15/13 06450 Kızılay, Çankaya, Ankara
- Newspaper: Pusula
- Membership (2024): ▼11
- Ideology: Kemalism; Republicanism; Full independence
- Slogan: for managing Turkey from Turkey

Website
- https://bcp.org.tr/

The Independent Republican Party (Turkish: Bağımsız Cumhuriyet Partisi, BCP) was a Kemalist political party defends republicanism and full independence in Turkey. It was founded by constitutional law professor Mümtaz Soysal and many academics on 24 July 2002.

Party joined the Turkey Alliance in 2023 and supported Ahmet Özal in the 2023 Turkish presidential election.
