= Zeynep Sevde Paksu =

Turkish writer and publisher (born 1983)

Zeynep Sevde (born 20 August 1983) is a Turkish writer and publisher.

== Biography ==
Zeynep Sevde studied physics in Yıldız Technical University and sociology in Boğaziçi University and Istanbul Bilgi University. Since 2001 she is working in the publishing sector as an editor, writer and translator. She is famous for her picturebooks and non-fiction books for children. Her books have been also published in Arabic, Macedonian, English, Chinese and Korean. She owns a publishing house called Taze Kitap that publishes children books.

== Books ==
- Kaplumbağa Battuta Günlükleri-İstanbul'da Bir Gün (Turtle Battuta Diaries), Profil Çocuk Yayınları (2015)
- Uyuyamayan Koala (Sleepless Koala), Taze Kitap (2015)
- Bay Ka Buk ve Ejder (Mr Eggsh Ell and the Dragon), Taze Kitap (2016)
- Yeşil Günlük (Green Diary), Taze Kitap (2016)
- Hayvan Atlası (Animal Atlas), Taze Kitap (2016)
- Kafası Değişikler Atlası (Atlas of Different Minds), Taze Kitap (2017)
- Dünyanın Öbür Ucunda Ne Var (What is There on the Other Side of the World), Taze Kitap (2018)
- Dünyanın Öbür Ucunda Kim Var (Who is There on the Other Side of the World), Taze Kitap (2022)
