= Tevfik Sırrı Gür High School =

Coordinates: 36.7970°N 34.6257°E

Tevfik Sırrı Gür Anatolian High School
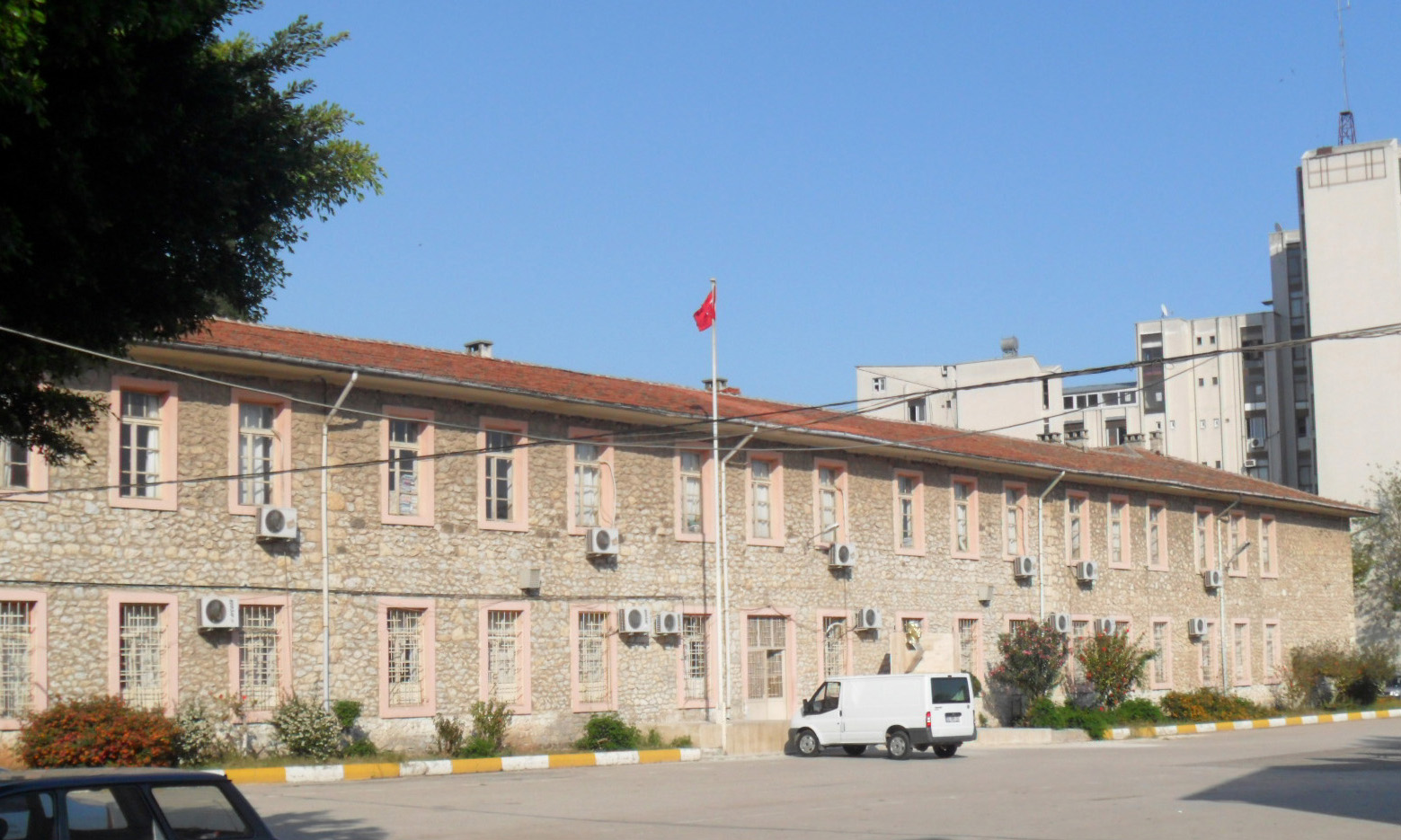

Location
- Tevfik Sırrı Gür Anadolu Lisesi; Mersin; Turkey

Information
- Type: Public, Anatolian High School
- Established: 1909 (building 1946)
- Grades: 5–12

Tevfik Sırrı Gür High School (or more formally "Tevfik Sırrı Gür Anatolian High School") is the oldest high school in Mersin, Turkey

== History ==
The high school was established in 1909 by the Ottoman Empire Ministry of Education. However when Mersin was occupied by the French army in 1918, the commander of the occupying forces closed the school. After the Turkish War of Independence, the school was reopened. Beginning by 1926, its curriculum was revised and it continued as a junior high school. In 1946, a new building was constructed thanks to the efforts of the governor Tevfik Sırrı Gür. From then on, it became a high school (Turkish: lise), keeping the junior section. In 2005, its curriculum was changed again and it became an Anatolian High School.

== Statistics ==
As of 2014, there are 56 teachers and 875 students in the school. There are 32 classrooms, 2 laboratories, a computer room, a conference hall, and a library.
