= Pınar Kür =

Turkish novelist, dramatist, and translator (1942–2025)

- Born: Havva Pınar Kür; 15 April 1943; Bursa, Turkey
- Died: 15 July 2025 (aged 82); Istanbul, Turkey
- Education: Queens College; Boğaziçi University; Sorbonne University (PhD)
- Occupations: Novelist; translator; academician
- Spouse: Can Kolukısa (m. 1964; div. 1969)
- Children: Emrah Kolukısa
- Parent(s): İsmet Kür; Behram Kür

Havva Pınar Kür (15 April 1943 – 15 July 2025) was a Turkish novelist, dramatist, and translator. She worked as an academician in the media and communication systems department at Istanbul Bilgi University. Pınar Kür was the daughter of İsmet Kür (1916–2013), who was an educator, journalist, columnist and writer of mainly children's literature. Her maternal aunt Halide Nusret Zorlutuna (1901–1984) was a poet. Kür was considered a leading Turkish novelist.

== Life and career ==
Pınar Kür was born in Bursa on 15 April 1943. Kür was the daughter of İsmet Kür (1916–2013), who was an educator, journalist, columnist and writer of mainly children's literature, and Azerbaijani Behram Kür, a French and mathematics teacher. Her maternal aunt Halide Nusret Zorlutuna (1901–1984) was a poet. She grew up in Bilecik and Zonguldak, and had her primary education in Zonguldak. Kür was also educated in New York, and then did her undergraduate studies at the Department of Advanced Languages at Robert College. In 1969 Kür earned a doctorate at the Sorbonne University in Paris, with a thesis on “Reality and Illusion in Twentieth Century Theatre”. Kür worked as a dramaturge at the State Theatre in Ankara in the early 1970s, and then moved to Istanbul. She lectured at the Istanbul University School of Foreign Languages until 1985. She worked as a lecturer at Istanbul Bilgi University. Kür was considered a leading Turkish novelist.

Kür published her first stories in the magazine Dost in 1971, and then published stories widely in newspapers and magazines such as Cumhuriyet, Yazko-Edebiyat, Hürriyet Gösteri, and Milliyet Sanat Magazine. She also published several novels. Her 1979 novel "Yarın Yarın" ("Tomorrow, Tomorrow") covers the events of the March 12 period, and prompted the collection and destruction of Kür's first four novels. She was charged with obscenity, but a two-year court case acquitted Kür of any wrongdoing.

Kür was awarded the 1984 Sait Faik Story Award, and in 2013 an honorary award from Ankara Story Festival. She died on 15 July 2025, at the age of 82. She had been ailing for some time and had been receiving hospital treatment in Istanbul. On 17 July 2025, after the funeral ceremony at the Teşvikiye Mosque, she was interred at the Ayazağa Cemetery in Istanbul.

== Works ==
- Yarın Yarın (1976)
- Küçük Oyuncu (1977)
- Asılacak Kadın (1979)
- Akışı Olmayan Sular (1983)
- Bitmeyen Aşk (1986)
- Bir Cinayet Romanı (1989)
- Sonuncu Sonbahar (1992)
- Bir Deli Ağaç (1992)
- Hayalet Hikâyeleri (2004)

== Translations ==
- Theo'ya Mektuplar / Vincent van Gogh (Yapı Kredi Yayınları, 1996) ISBN 978-975-363-551-6
- Vişnenin Cinsiyeti - Jeanette Wİnterson - (Sexing the Cherry)
- Bağla Şu İşi
- Aç Sınıfın Laneti
- Ademden Önce - Jack London
- Tutku - Jeanette Winterson ( The Passion)
- Yabancı Kucak - Ian McEwan (The Comfort of Strangers)
- Geniş Geniş Bir Deniz - Jean Rhys - (Wide Sargasso Sea)
- Dalda Duran Kuşlar - Jean Rhys - (Öykülerinden seçmeler)
- Günaydın Geceyarısı - Jean Rhys - Goodmorning Midnight
- Karanlıkta Yolculuk - Jean Rhys - (Voyage in the Dark)
- Dörtlü - Jean Rhys - (Quartet)
- Karamlıkta Kahkaha - Vladimir Nabokov - (Laughter in the Dark)
- Şaklaban - Morris West
- Ailenin Laneti - Dashiel Hammet
- Yunus İnsanlar - Tırsten Krol
- Doğmamış Çocuğa Mektup
- Durulmayan Bir Kafa - Kay Redfield Jamison
