= Latife Tekin =

Influential Turkish female authors (born 1957)

- Born: 1957 (age 68–69); Kayseri, Turkey
- Occupation: Novelist
- Writing career
- Period: 1983-present
- Genre: Novel
- Literary movement: Magic realism

Latife Tekin (born 1957) is one of the most influential Turkish female authors.

== Biography ==
She was born in 1957 in the village of Karacahevenk, in the Bünyan district of Kayseri. She came to Istanbul with her family in 1966, when she was nine years old. She completed her secondary education at Beşiktaş Girls' High School. She worked for a short time in Istanbul Telephone General Directorate. Her first book "Sevgili Arsız Ölüm" was published in 1983. She gained great fame with her first novel, which tells about village life and people in Anatolia in a fairy-tale atmosphere and with the taste of "One Hundred Years of Solitude" (Gabriel Garcia Marquez). After this novel, which was also attributed to the magical realism movement, other novels followed one after another. Her works have been translated into English, German, French, Italian, Persian and Dutch.

She became one of the leading names of the writers of her generation with her different style and approach. Latife Tekin started a "Literary House" project in Bodrum Gumusluk. The project, supported by Garanti Bank, started construction with the architectural project prepared by architect Hüsmen Ersöz in 1998 (1999). With the support of painter Hale Arpacıoğlu from Koç Group companies, the construction of the Art House was started as a part of the same architectural project.

Latife Tekin is working on the completion of a space in Bodrum Gümüşlük, where everyone can write and discuss, and where artists can produce works away from the hustle and bustle of the big city.

She was awarded the Erdal Öz Literature Award in September 2019. It was the subject of the May–June 2020 issue of the KE magazine published by Kartal Municipality.

== Works ==
=== Novels ===
- Sevgili Arsız Ölüm (Dear Shameless Death) (1983)
- Berci Kristin Çöp Masalları (1984)
- Gece Dersleri (1986)
- Buzdan Kılıçlar (1989)
- Aşk İşaretleri (1995)
- Ormanda Ölüm Yokmuş (2001)
- Unutma Bahçesi (2004)
- Muinar (2006)
- Rüyalar ve Uyanışlar Defteri (2009)
- Manves City (2018)
- Sürüklenme (2018)
- Zamansız (2022)

=== Plays/scripts ===
- Bir Yudum Sevgi (1984)

=== Memoirs ===
- Gümüşlük Akademisi (1997)

== See also ==
- Turkish literature
- List of postmodern authors
