= Halide Nusret Zorlutuna =

Turkish writer

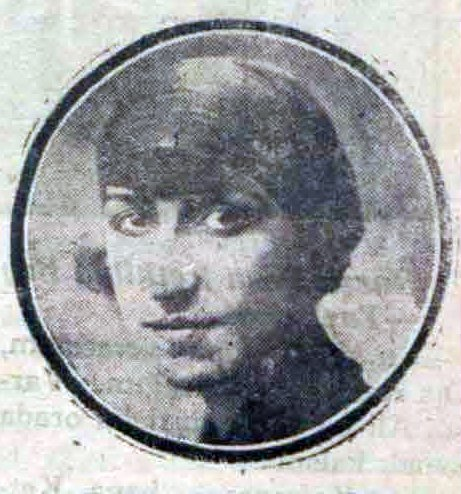
Image of Halide Nusret

Halide Nusret Zorlutuna (1901 – 10 June 1984) was a Turkish poet and novelist.

== Biography ==
Zorlutuna was born in Istanbul, Ottoman Empire as the daughter of Mehmet Selim Bey, a journalist and political prisoner. Brought up in exile with her father, she later married and travelled with an army officer. A teacher of Turkish literature in schools, she took part in movements for the rights of women and children.

Her sister İsmet Kür (1916–2013) was an educator, journalist, columnist and writer of mainly children's literature. Her niece, Pınar Kür (1943-2025), was a journalist.

== Teaching life ==
Halide Hanım continued her teaching career, which she started in Edirne Teachers' School in 1924, in high schools in various parts of the country such as Kırklareli, Kars, Ardahan, Urfa, Karaman, Istanbul and Ankara. While she was teaching in Edirne, she married the Fourth Cavalry Regiment major Aziz Vecihi Zorlutuna in 1926.

Married life lasted until the death of his wife 45 years later, their son Ergün was born in 1930 and their daughter Emine was born in 1938. After three years of teaching in Edirne, she was appointed to Istanbul Girls' High School and moved to Istanbul with her husband. The foundations of his friendship with Şükûfe Nihal were laid at this time. After teaching in Istanbul for seven years, he was appointed to Kars, requesting oriental service.

After his civil service in Kars, he went to Karaman, Urfa, following his wife, and worked as a teacher in Urfa for four years. He taught in Ankara since 1948. Halide retired voluntarily in 1957 while she was working at the Ankara Technical Teachers' School for Girls. He collected his memories of teaching in his book My Little Friends.

== Literary life and activity ==
Halide Nusret wrote her first novel, Küller (Turkish: Ashes), when she was 19 years old. She published articles in various journals, including Kadın Gazetesi, Milli Mecmua, Türk Kadını, Kadın Dünyası, Aydabir, Salon Mecmuası, Çınaraltı, Çağrı, Hilal, Defne, Hisar, Ayşe, Töre, Süs and Türk Edebiyatı, and in the newspapers Vakit, Zafer, Kudret, Haber, Yeni İstanbul, Sabah, and Hürriyet. She aroused interest in the literary world with her work named Hanım Letters published in 1923. She started writing poetry during the armistice years. She joined the national literature movement with the effect and excitement of the Turkish War of Independence. Her poem "Git Bahar", which she wrote with national feelings, made her known. She adhered to the syllabic understanding in her poems evaluated in the national literature movement. She is known as one of the rare poets whose poems the famous poet Yahya Kemal memorized. There are also unstaged but published plays of Halide Nusret. The names of some of them are: Unremembering Governor, Veil and Cage, Leaf in the Wind, Who's Guilty?, True Love, Ali Usta's Grandchildren, Slum Roses.

== Publications ==
- Poetry
  - Geceden Taşan Dertler (Sorrow Flooding Off Night, 1930)
  - Yayla Türküsü (Song of the Plateau, 1943)
  - Yurdumun Dört Bucağı (Every Place of My Country, 1950)
  - Ellerim Bomboş (My Hands Are Empty, 1967).
- Novels
  - Küller (Ashes, 1921)
  - Sisli Geceler (Misty Nights, 1922)
  - Gülün Babası Kim (Who is the Father of Rose, 1933)
  - Büyükanne (Grandmother, 1971)
  - Aydınlık Kapı (The Bright Gate, 1974)
  - Aşk ve Zafer (The Love and the Victory, 1978)
  - Bir Devrin Romanı (Novel of an Age, 2004).
- Short stories
  - Beyaz Selvi (The White Cypress, 1945).
- Letters
  - Hanım Mektupları (Lady Letters, 1923).
- Autobiography
  - Benim Küçük Dostlarım (My Little Friends, 1977).
