= Adalet Ağaoğlu =

Turkish novelist (1929–2020)

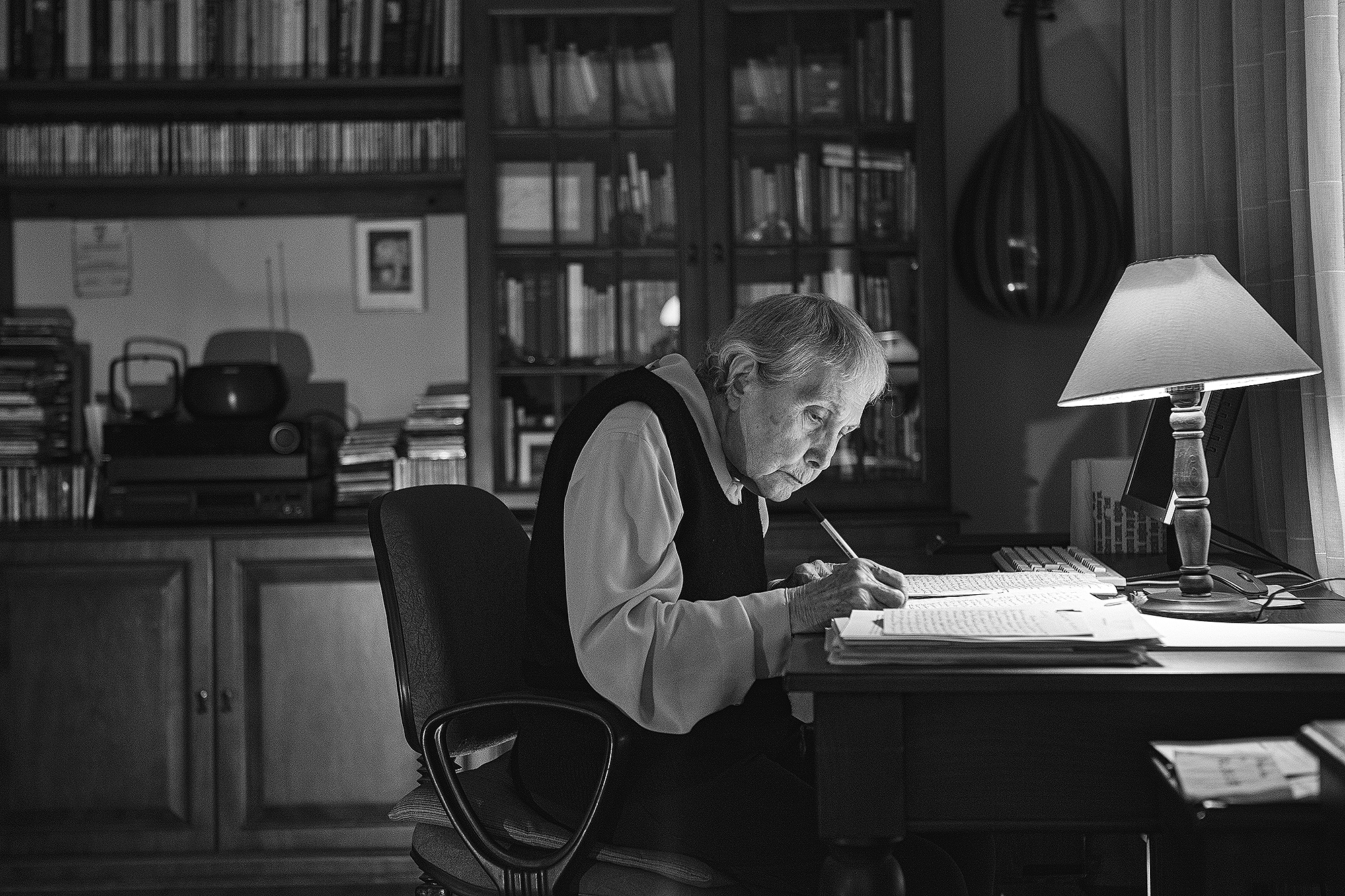
- Born: Adalet Sümer; 23 October 1929; Nallıhan, Ankara, Turkey
- Died: 14 July 2020 (aged 90); Istanbul, Turkey
- Education: Ankara University
- Occupations: Novelist, playwright
- Spouse: Halim Ağaoğlu (m. 1954; died 2018)
- Awards: Turkish Presidency Merit Award; 1995

Adalet Ağaoğlu (née Sümer; 23 October 1929 – 14 July 2020) was a Turkish novelist and playwright, considered one of the foremost novelists of 20th-century Turkish literature. She also wrote essays, memoirs, and short stories.

== Life ==
She was born on 23 October 1929 in Nallıhan. Her father is Hafız Mustafa Sümer, a fabric merchant. Her mother is Emine Hanim and hails from Sarajevo. She is the second child and only daughter of a family of four children. Her siblings are Cazip Sümer (1925–1975), playwright, actor Güner Sümer (1936–1977) and businessman Ayhan Sümer (1930–2020). After completing her primary education in Nallıhan, she moved to Ankara with her family in 1938.

After completing her secondary education at Ankara Girls' High School, she graduated from the French Language and Literature Department of the Faculty of Language, History and Geography of Ankara University in 1950.

Her interest in literature started with poems in her high school life, and she soon turned to playwriting. She started writing for the first time in 1946 by publishing theater reviews in Ulus newspaper. Her poems were published in Kaynak Magazine between 1948 and 1950.

Between 1951 and 1970 she held various positions in TRT. She wrote her first radio play, "Aşk Şarkısı", the year she started working at Ankara Radio. While working at the radio, she founded the first private theater of Ankara, "Meydan Sahnesi", with her four friends (Kartal Tibet, Üner İlsever, Çetin Köroğlu, Nur Sabuncu). She published Meydan Sahne Magazine. In 1953, she went to Paris to increase her manners and knowledge about theatre. The theatre play "Let's Write a Play", which she wrote with Sevim Uzungören in 1953, was staged in Ankara in the same year. The artist, who married engineer Halim Ağaoğlu in 1954, continued as a playwright until she wrote her first novel. She became one of the leading playwrights of the sixties and seventies with the plays she wrote one after the other. The play Crack on the Roof was banned while it was being staged at the Ankara State Theater in 1965; this event prompted her to write a novel. The artist, who resigned from the TRT Radio Department in 1970 on the grounds of confiscating TRT's autonomy, did not engage in any other job other than writing after that date. She used pseudonyms such as "Remus Tealada" and "Parker Quinck" in some periods of her literary life.

Her first novel, Ölmeye Yatmak (Lying to Die), was published in 1973. All her works have been the subject of intense debate since her first novel, which examines the turmoil and changes in the recent history of Turkish society. Ölmeye Yatmak created a trilogy with the novels Bir Düğün Gecesi (A Wedding Night) (1979) and No (1989) that she wrote later and won many awards (This trilogy is presented with the title Dar Zamanlar (Narrow Times) in line with the author's request in new editions by Yapı Kredi. ). As soon as Bir Düğün Gecesi (A Wedding Night) (1979) and No (1989) were published, her second novel, Fikrimin İnce Gülü, was confiscated in its fourth edition. Ağaoğlu, who was prosecuted in 1981 on the charge of "insulting and defaming the military forces" about the novel Fikrimin İnce Gülü, was acquitted after two years of trial. Bir Düğün Gecesi (A Wedding Night), on the other hand, remained at the investigation stage. The accusation of plagiarism from Aldous Huxley was also brought forward for the novel Bir Düğün Gecesi (A Wedding Night), which was deemed worthy of three important novel awards of the period, and caused long discussions.

After 1983, she started to live in Istanbul. In 1985, she published Migration Cleanup, which is a memoir-novel. She returned to playwriting in 1991 with Çok Uzak Fazla Yakın (Too Far Too Close). This work was deemed worthy of the Türkiye İş Bankası Grand Prize in literature the following year. Can Yücel's phrase "You are the most beautiful accident in Turkey" for Adalet Ağaoğlu, who had a serious traffic accident in 1996 and was hospitalized for two years, became the title of a river conversation book by Feridun Andaç with Adalet Ağaoğlu. The book was published in 2006. The archive, which brought together the articles about Adalet Ağaoğlu, was prepared by her husband, Halim Ağaoğlu, and was published in 2003 under the title Herkes Kendi Kitabının İçini Tanır (Everyone Knows the Inside of His Own Book), in commemoration of the 55th anniversary of Adalet Ağaoğlu's authorship.

Ağaoğlu was among the founders of the Human Rights Association, which was founded in 1986, but resigned in July 2005, stating that the HRA had a one-sided racist-nationalist stance and saying, "They are following a pro-PKK policy." She supported the "I Apologize campaign" in 2008, calling for a collective apology for the Armenian genocide.

During a panel held with various participants during the 2010 Constitutional Referendum, she was exposed to an egg attack by a group called Student Collectives.

She announced that she stopped writing after the death of her husband Halim Ağaoğlu in 2018.[6] She was awarded an honorary doctorate by Boğaziçi University in 2018 for her contributions to the cultural and intellectual world of our country with her original and pioneering works in the field of Turkish novels.

== Death ==
Ağaoğlu, who received intensive care treatment, died on 14 July 2020 due to multiple organ failure. Her body was buried in Cebeci Asri Cemetery on 15 July.

== Awards ==
Ağaoğlu received numerous honors besides literary awards for her writing. For her perception of subtle and overt changes in modern Turkish society and her writing entitled "Modernism and Social Change", Ağaoğlu received the "Turkish Presidency Merit Award" in 1995. In 1998, Ağaoğlu received an "Honorary Ph.D." from Anadolu University and a "Ph.D. of Humane Letters" from the Ohio State University.

== Works ==
=== Theatre and radio drama ===
- Yaşamak – 1955
- Evcilik Oyunu – 1964
- Sınırlarda Aşk – 1965
- Çatıdaki Çatlak – 1965
- Tombala – 1967
- Çatıdaki Çatlak 1967
- Sınırlarda Aşk-Kış-Barış 1970
- Üç Oyun: Bir Kahramanın Ölümü, Çıkış, Kozalar 1973
- Kendini Yazan Şarkı 1976
- Duvar Öyküsü 1992
- Çok Uzak-Fazla Yakın 1991

=== Novels ===
- Ölmeye Yatmak – 1973
- Fikrimin İnce Gülü – 1976
- Bir Düğün Gecesi – 1979
- Yazsonu – 1980
- Üç Beş Kişi – 1984 translated by John Goulden "Curfew: A Novel" (University of Texas Press, 1997) ISBN 0292704798
- Hayır... – 1987
- Ruh Üşümesi – 1991
- Romantik Bir Viyana Yazı – 1993
