= Fazıl Ahmet Aykaç =

Turkish politician (1884–1967)

F. Ahmet Aykaç
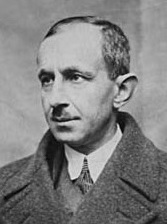

Member of the Grand National Assembly

Personal details
- Born: 24 July 1884 Constantinople, Ottoman Empire
- Died: 5 December 1967 (aged 83)

Fazıl Ahmet Aykaç (24 July 1884, in Constantinople – 5 December 1967) was a Turkish poet, educator, civil servant, government minister and politician.

== Biography ==
Fazıl Ahmet's civil service life starts just before the Second Constitutional Era. He worked in the Nazaread Mekâtib-i Ecnebiyye (Ministry of Education). After the Second Constitutional Era, he started to teach in the Dâr'ül-Muallimîn-i Âliye with the proposal of the Ministry of Education. He followed this up with teaching at various local and foreign schools in Constantinople. In the same period he was among the contributors of Mehâsin, a monthly women's magazine.

In 1918, after a short time working in the Düyûn-ı Umumiye (Ottoman Public Debt Administration), he returned to work as an educator. Fazıl Ahmet has taught various courses such as Turkish literature, ethics, philosophy, pedagogy, psychology, French and translation. He died in 1967.
