= İstanbul (newspaper) =

NEWSPAPER IN ISTANBUL

- Type: Daily
- Owner: Yeni İstanbul Gazetecilik co.
- Founder: Habip Edip Törehan
- Editor-in-chief: Baturhan Koçak
- Founded: 1949; 77 years ago
- Language: Turkish
- Headquarters: Fatih, Istanbul, Turkey
- Website: www.istanbulgazetesi.com.tr

İstanbul is a Turkish-language newspaper published in Istanbul, Turkey.

The newspaper was launched by Habib Edip Törehan in Istanbul, Turkey in 1949. Its original name was Yeni İstanbul ("New Istanbul"). With a newspaper heading in blue, it drew attention among other dailies having traditional red-colored heading. In 1964, it was bought by businessman Kemal Uzan. In 1973, it was renamed to İstanbul. Although it was closed in 1981, the newspaper resumed publication in 1986.
