= Fitnat Hanım =

Zübeyde
- Born: Istanbul, Turkey
- Died: 1780; İstanbul
- Occupation: Poet
- Writing career
- Pen name: Fitnat

Fitnat Hanım (also known as Zubeyda or Zübeyde Fitnat-Khanim, died 1780) was the pen name of the Ottoman Turkish woman poet Zübeyde, a lyric poet "considered the most important woman poet of the Ottoman school".

== Biography ==
Her birth date is not known, but she was probably younger than her brother, who was born in 1723/4. Other scholars have claimed she was born in 1717.

Fitnat is known by her pseudonym, Fitnat, where "Hanım" is the Turkish word "lady". Fitnat came from a family of religious scholars. Her father was Ebu İshakzade Mehmet Esad Efendi (died 1752), a Sheik ul-Islam, the highest religious authority, under Mahmud I. Her grandfather, Ebuishakzade İshak Efendi (1679-1734), and her brother Mehmed Şerif Efendi were also scholar poets. Her husband was Derviş Mehmet Efendi, a kazasker (judge) of Rumeli (the European portion of the Empire). He was a grandson of Feyzullah Efendi, Sheik ul-Islam under Mustafa II. However, Fitnat was a more accomplished scholar than her husband, and the marriage was not a success.

Fitnat is "considered the most important woman poet of the Ottoman school", writing lyric poems. Fitnat was able to be admitted to the literary circles of the era, and she was known to read poems to Koca Ragıp Pasha, the grand vizier. However, little is known about her later years. Kate Fleet writes "Her story is in many respects one of stifled promise, with the nurturing latitude of the parental home reined in by the strictures of marriage and an unsympathetic mate."

Some of her poems were translated into Western languages in the 19th century. Muallim Naci, a well known poet of the 19th century calls her "queen of the poets".
