= Sevgi Soysal =

Turkish writer (1936–1976)

- Born: Sevgi Yenen; September 30, 1936; Istanbul, Turkey
- Died: November 22, 1976 (aged 40); Istanbul, Turkey
- Education: Ankara University; University of Göttingen
- Occupation: Novelist
- Spouse(s): Özdemir Nutku (m. 1956; div. 1965) Başar Sabuncu (m. 1965; div. 1971) Mümtaz Soysal (m. 1971)
- Children: 3
- Writing career
- Pen name: Sevgi Nutku, Sevgi Sabuncu, Sevgi Soysal
- Language: Turkish, German
- Genres: Novel, short story
- Notable works: Tante Rosa; Yenişehir'de Bir Öğle Vakti; Yürüme

Sevgi Soysal (born Sevgi Yenen; September 30, 1936 – November 22, 1976) was a Turkish writer.

== Personal life ==
She was born in Istanbul on September 30, 1936, as the third child of six to Mithat Yenen, an architect-civil servant, and his German wife Anneliese Rupp, who took later the Turkish name Aliye. After completing high school in Ankara, Soysal studied archaeology at Ankara University, but left without graduating. She obtained her degree in the late 1960s.

In 1956, she married poet and translator Özdemir Nutku. She followed her husband to Germany, where she attended lectures on archaeology and theatre at the University of Göttingen. She then returned home. In 1958, she gave birth to a son named Korkut.

Between 1960 and 1961 she worked at the Cultural Center of the German Embassy and Ankara Radio. She acted in a solo role in the theatre play Zafer Madalyası (Turkish version of Bad Day at Black Rock) staged at Ankara Meydan Theatre and directed by Haldun Dormen. In 1965, she married Başar Sabuncu, whom she met during her acting career.

After the military coup on March 12, 1971, she was accused of belonging to a left-wing organization and put in prison. During her detention in Ankara's Mamak Prison, she met Mümtaz Soysal, a professor of Constitutional law who was also detained for making communist propaganda. They married in the prison. She gave birth to daughter Defna in December 1973 and to daughter Funda in March 1975. Sevgi Soysal was arrested again for political reasons. She spent eight months in prison, and two and half months in exile in Adana.

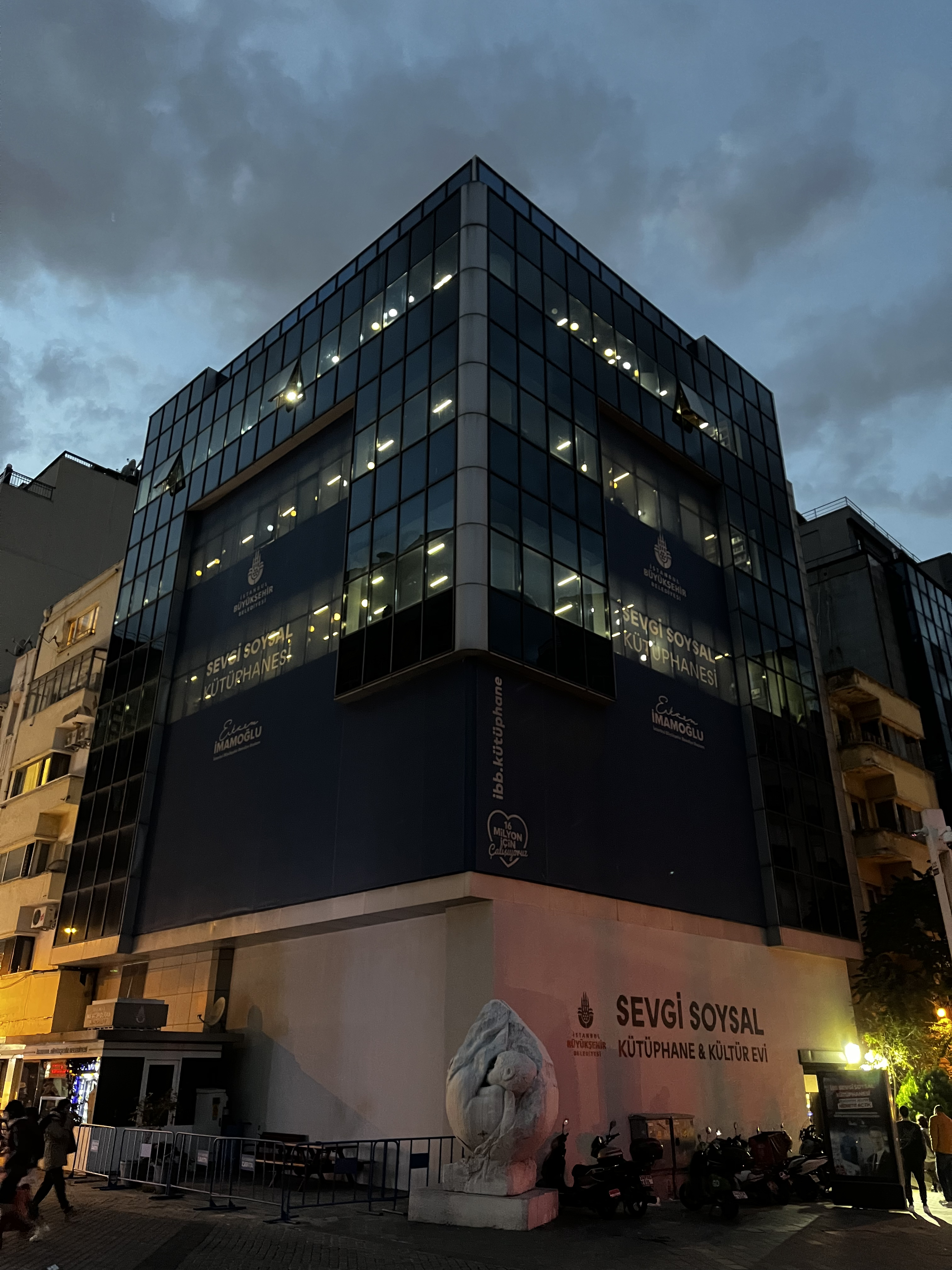
Sevgi Soysal Library in Taksim Square, Istanbul

Sevgi Soysal was diagnosed with breast cancer, and lost one of her breasts in late 1975. She underwent another breast cancer surgery in September 1976, and went with her husband to London for medical treatment. Returning home, she died in Istanbul on November 22, 1976, at age forty. She was laid to rest in the Zincirlikuyu Cemetery in Istanbul.

== Writing career ==
In 1962, she published a collection of short stories, Tutkulu Perçem ("Passionate Bangs"). In the same year, she began to work with the Turkish Radio and Television Corporation (TRT). Her 1970 novel Yürümek ("Walking") received the Turkish Radio and Television Corporation Achievement Award but was banned for obscenity.

She wrote under the pen names:

- Sevgi Nutku while she was married to Özdemir Nutku
- Sevgi Sabuncu while she was married to Başar Sabuncu
- Sevgi Soysal while she was married to Mümtaz Soysal

== Selected works ==
Her notable works are:

- Tante Rosa, novel (1968)
- Yürümek, novel (1970)
- Yenişehir'de Bir Öğle Vakti (Noontime in Yenişehir), novel (1973), received the Orhan Kemal Award in 1974
- Şafak (Dawn), novel (1975)
- Yıldırım Bölge Kadınlar Koğuşu (Yıldırım Area Women's Ward), memoir (1976)
- Barış Adlı Çocuk (A Child Named Peace), short stories (1976)
- Hoşgeldin Ölüm (Welcome, Death!), unfinished novel
