= Zeynep Ahunbay =

Leading Turkish scholar of antiquities (born 1946)

- Born: 1946 (age 79–80); Ünye, Ordu Province
- Education: Istanbul Technical University
- Occupation: scholar of antiquities
- Notable work: The restoration of the Zeyrek Mosque (Monastery of the Pantocrator)

Zeynep Ahunbay (born 1946 in Ünye, Ordu Province) is a leading Turkish scholar of antiquities.

== Biography ==
Dr. Ahunbay was born in Ünye, Ordu Province, a small town in the Black Sea region of Turkey.

She received her PhD in architectural history in 1976 from Istanbul Technical University, where in 1988 she became a professor of Architectural History and Preservation.

She has published numerous books on restoration and conservation of cultural heritage. Dr. Ahunbay's best-known works are the restoration of the Zeyrek Mosque (Monastery of the Pantocrator) with the art historians and professors Metin Ahunbay and Robert Ousterhout, as well as the restoration of Istanbul's city walls.

She was also member of the Commission to preserve national monuments of Bosnia and Herzegovina, from December 2001 to February 2016, when new board was elected for period since 2016.

At the present, she is working on a conservation project for the Haghia Sophia museum in Istanbul and rescue work for the ancient city of Hasankeyf.

== See also ==
- Zeyrek Mosque

== Sources ==
- Institut Européen des Itinéraires Culturels - Biography of Zeynep Ahunbay
- ArchNet.org - Zeyrek Church Mosque
