= Sevim Burak =

Turkish writer

- Born: Zeliha Sevim Burak; 29 June 1931; Istanbul, Turkey
- Died: 31 December 1983 (aged 52); Istanbul, Turkey
- Education: Deutsche Schule Istanbul
- Occupation: Author

Zeliha Sevim Burak (29 June 1931 – 31 December 1983) was a Turkish author and playwright.

Her mother was a Jewish migrant from Bulgaria, and her father was a Turkish sea captain. She was born in Ortaköy and grew up in the Istanbul neighbourhood of Kuzguncuk. She completed middle school in the German high school in Istanbul.

She worked in a range of professions from bookshop assistant to seamstress and model, but her main work was writing. Her avant-garde and post-structuralist novels, short stories and plays continue to be celebrated in exhibitions such as "One Master, One World: Sevim Burak" at the Yapı Kredi Cultural Centre 28 May-27 June 2004 and special journal issues such as Kitap-lik issue 155 which celebrates the 80th birthday of the author.

== Works ==
Sevim Burak published three books in her lifetime: her first collection of short stories Yanık Saraylar (Burnt Palaces) in 1965, her play Sahibinin Sesi (His Master's Voice) and her second collection of short stories, titled with reference to the year and a half she lived in Nigeria, Afrika Dansı (African Dance) in 1982. Other works, including the play İşte Baş, İşte Gövde, İşte Kanatlar (Here the Head, Here the Body, Here the Wings), the novel Ford Mach I, the collection of short stories Palyaço Ruşen, and a collection of letters written to her son (Mach I’den Mektuplar) were published posthumously.

Sevim Burak's work can be divided into three categories: key short stories from Yanık Saraylar (Burnt Palaces) such as “Oh God Jehovah”, “The House Inlaid with Mother of Pearl”, and the eponymous “Burnt Palaces”, and their dramatised versions the playtexts Sahibinin Sesi (His Master's Voice) and İşte Baş, İşte Gövde, İşte Kanatlar (Here the Head, Here the Body, Here the Wings” and finally, short lyrical stories that share the same universe with these works and appear in Afrika Dansı (African Dance).

== Selected publications ==
- Yanık Saraylar (Burnt Palaces) - 1965
- Sahibinin Sesi (His Master's Voice) - 1982
- Afrika Dansı (African Dance) - 1982
- Everest my lord - 1984
- Ford Mach I - 2003
- Mach 1'dan mektuplar (Letters from Mach 1)- 2004
- Beni Deliler Anlar - 2009
