= Sevin Okyay =

Turkish critic, writer and translator (born 1942)

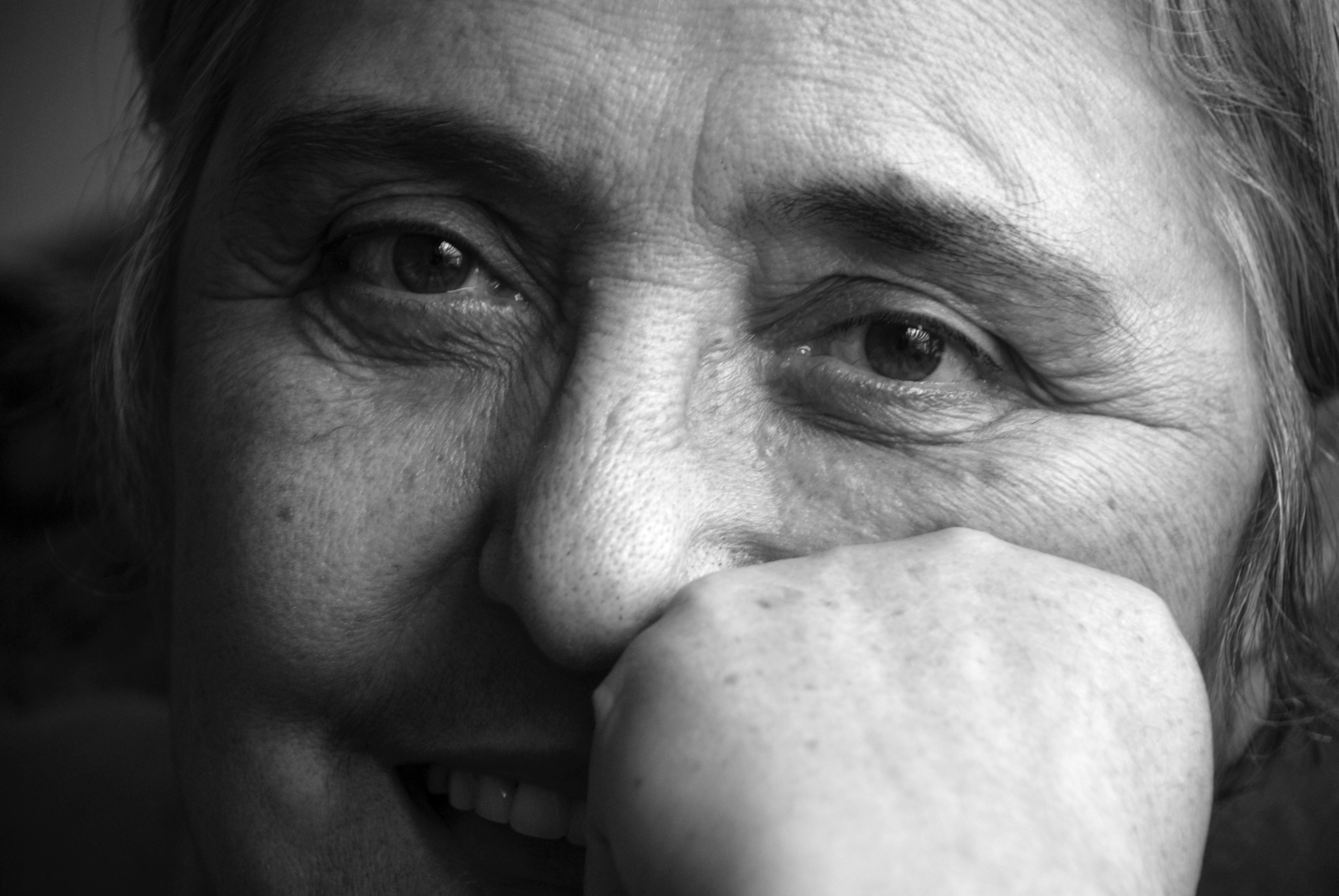
- Sevin Okyay (2008)
- Born: 25 November 1942 (age 83); Istanbul, Turkey
- Occupations: Literary critic, journalist, writer, translator
- Notable work: Harry Potter translations
- Children: 2

Sevin Okyay (born 11 November 1942, Istanbul) is a Turkish critic, journalist, author, columnist, radio host and translator. Best known for her translations of the Harry Potter books, Okyay is Turkey's first female film critic. She writes about cinema, sports, literature and jazz and hosts two radio shows: Caz ve Ötesi (Jazz and Beyond) and Cinayet Masası (Murder Desk).

== Early life and career ==
Okyay and her younger brother Sinan were born to an architect-engineer father and a housemaker mother. Their father was Albanian and their mother was Circassian. They spent their childhood winters in Beşiktaş and the summers in Maltepe. They lived with their mother following their parents' divorce when Okyay was 10 or 12. She credits her mother with starting her love of the arts through taking her and her brother to plays and concerts, and reading to them.

While attending Arnavutköy American High School for Girls, Okyay played basketball and volleyball. Tansu Çiller was a classmate and volleyball teammate. Okyay briefly attended university before being expelled for absenteeism.

Okyay has been a translator since 1963. Her first translation was a 333-page detective novel by Georgette Heyer about a 19th-century thief in London, which she found challenging due to the slang. She became a political correspondent for Politika in 1975 to financially supplement her translation work. While at Politika, she was given an assignment to speak to members of the Revolutionary Youth Federation of Turkey. The team was leaving as she arrived and they advised her to wait for them to return. They did not. She was later arrested by police for loitering and spent four days in jail. She started at Milliyet Ekler in 1983 and worked closely with Enis Batur. Batur sent her to see Federico Fellini's And the Ship Sails On in 1984; while the job was ostensibly meant for her colleague Ömer Madra, he refused to write the column and encouraged her to do so instead. This made her Turkey's first female film critic. Over the course of her career, Okyay has worked for Radikal, Dunya, Ayrıntılı Haber, Hürriyet, Gergedan, Şehir, Kapris, Star, Gösteri, Elele and Kadın. She also translated for UNICEF's magazine. She began writing about sports while working for Nokta.

Okyay presented Ve Sinema on TRT for five and a half years. Though she has a been involved in radio programming since 1995, with her detective program Cinayet Masası (Murder Desk) on air for 26 years as of 2024, it wasn't until the COVID-19 pandemic that she joined Açık Radyo and later NTV Radio to broadcast her music show Caz ve Ötesi (Jazz and Beyond). Earlier in her career, she appeared in the 1999 film Run for Money and translated plays including The House of Bernarda Alba, Hamlet 2001 and Othello.

She continues to write about cinema, literature, jazz and sports for Milliyet, 221B and BirGün, among other publications. She also sits on juries for multiple associations, including the award committees for the International Crime and Punishment Film Festival, the Istanbul Foundation for Culture and Arts' Talât Sait Halman Translation Award, Antalya Golden Orange Film Festival and the Turkish Film Critics Association. In 2017, journalist Pınar İlkiz wrote a book about Okyay's life called Hakikaten-Sevin Okyay Anlatıyor.

== Personal life ==
Okyay married at 21 and had two children, son Kutlukhan Kutlu and daughter Elif Kutlu. She and her spouse later divorced. Kutlukhan is also a translator and worked with his mother on the Harry Potter books, while Elif directs broadcasts for NTV. Okyay has lived in Kadıköy for more than 25 years.

== Awards ==
- 2010: Made an honorary member of SİYAD
- 2012: Cinema Honor Award at the International Istanbul Film Festival
- 2013: Cinema Labor Award, SİYAD
- 2013: Cinema Honor Award, İKSV
- 2014: Honorary award for contributions to translation, Çeviri Derneği
- 2016: Mavi Anka Award, Fantasy and Science Fiction Arts Association
- 2019: Bilge Olgaç Achievement Award, Flying Broom International Women's Film Festival
- 2021: Orhan Kemal Labor Award at the Adana Golden Boll Film Festival
- 2022: Contribution to Cinema Award at the International Crime and Punishment Film Festival
- 2021: Labor Award, Cinema Writing at the International Women Directors Festival
- 2022: Mass Communication Award at the Ankara Film Festival
- 2023: Labor Award at the İzmir International Film and Music Festival

== Bibliography ==
- 1996: Ilk Romanim (My First Novel) – children's book
- 1996: 120 Filmde Seyriâlem (A Cinema Tour in 120 Films) – selected movie critiques
- 1998: Çiçek Dürbünü (Kaleidoscope) – collected essays
- 2002: Gol Atan Kaleye (Goal to the Goalkeeper) – essay
- 2010: Masal Pınarı (Fairytale Spring) – play; staged by Pınar Selek
- 2018: Ara Sıra Ve Daima (Sometimes and Always) – "portrait articles" about people who changed her life; originally published in Radikal

=== Selected translations ===
During the COVID-19 pandemic, Okyay translated Othello and Fırtına. She has also translated the plays Seeking for Helen and Benim Cyrenos and the lyrics for Nuri Pakdil's play Horror.

Original title	Author	Translation	Publication year	Publisher	ISBN	Notes
Tales of the Early World	Ted Hughes	Ilk Dünya Hikayeleri	1999	Yapı Kredi Yayınları	ISBN 975-363-784-5	
Delights of Turkey	Edouard Roditi	Türkiye Tatlari	1999	Yapı Kredi Yayınları	ISBN 975-363-909-0	
Raise High the Roof Beam, Carpenters and Seymour: An Introduction	J.D. Salinger	Yükseltin Tavan Kirisini, Ustalar ve Seymour – bir Giris	1999	Yapı Kredi Yayınları	ISBN 975-363-318-1	With Coskun Yerli
Animal Farm	George Orwell	Hayvanlar Çiftliği	2000	Yapı Kredi Yayınları	ISBN 9789757736776	
Harry Potter and the Chamber of Secrets	J.K. Rowling	Harry Potter ve Sirlar Odasi	2001	Yapı Kredi Yayınları	ISBN 975-08-0295-0	
Harry Potter and the Prisoner of Azkaban	J.K. Rowling	Harry Potter ve Azkaban Tutsagi	2001	Yapı Kredi Yayınları	ISBN 975-08-0311-6	With Kutlukhan Kutlu
Harry Potter and the Goblet of Fire	J.K. Rowling	Harry Potter ve Ates Kadehi	2001	Yapı Kredi Yayınları	ISBN 975-08-0331-0	With Kutlukhan Kutlu
Fantastic Beasts and Where to Find Them	J.K. Rowling	Fantastik Canavlar Nelerdir, Nerelerde Bulunurlar?	2002	Yapı Kredi Yayınları	ISBN 975-08-0413-9	With Gül Sarioglu
Harry Potter and the Order of the Phoenix	J.K. Rowling	Harry Potter ve Zümrüdüanka Yoldasligi	2003	Yapı Kredi Yayınları	ISBN 975-08-0645-X	With Kutlukhan Kutlu
Harry Potter and the Half-Blood Prince	J.K. Rowling	Harry Potter ve Melez Prens	2005	Yapı Kredi Yayınları	ISBN 975-08-0995-5	With Kutlukhan Kutlu
Harry Potter and the Deathly Hallows	J.K. Rowling	Harry Potter ve Ölüm Yadigarları	2007	Yapı Kredi Yayınları	ISBN 9789750812989	With Kutlukhan Kutlu
Death on the Nile	Agatha Christie	Nil'de Ölüm – Malikanedeki Esrar	2010	NTV Yayınları	ISBN 9786055813673	
The Secret of Chimneys	Agatha Christie	Nil'de Ölüm – Malikanedeki Esrar	2010	NTV Yayınları	ISBN 9786055813673	
The Pony Mad Princess – a Surprise for Princess Ellie	Diana Kimpton	Midilli Tutkunu Prenses – Prenses Ellie'ye Sürpriz	2011	Türkiye İş Bankası Kültür Yayınları	ISBN 9786053603627	
The Call of Cthulhu	H. P. Lovecraft	Cthulhu’nun Çağrısı ve Diğer Tuhaf Öyküler	2019	DEX	ISBN 9786050959512	
The Colour Out of Space	H. P. Lovecraft	Cthulhu’nun Çağrısı ve Diğer Tuhaf Öyküler	2019	DEX	ISBN 9786050959512	
The Whisperer in Darkness	H. P. Lovecraft	Cthulhu’nun Çağrısı ve Diğer Tuhaf Öyküler	2019	DEX	ISBN 9786050959512	
The Case of Charles Dexter Ward	H. P. Lovecraft	Cthulhu’nun Çağrısı ve Diğer Tuhaf Öyküler	2019	DEX	ISBN 9786050959512	
At the Mountains of Madness	H. P. Lovecraft	Cthulhu’nun Çağrısı ve Diğer Tuhaf Öyküler	2019	DEX	ISBN 9786050959512	
Remember This House	James Baldwin	Ben Senin Zencin Değilim’i	2020	Kırmızı Kedi Yayinevi	ISBN 9786052986516	
