= Hasibe Çerko =

Turkish author

Hasibe Çerko (Niğde, November 16, 1971– ) is a Turkish author. She has gained relative interest in her writing for incorporating philosophical notions and questions in her stories. She graduated from Istanbul University, Faculty of Letters, Department of Sociology and her first story, Bir Sokrates Oyunu, was published in 2007. She then penned Us Lekesi (2010), Diana'nın Kanlı Kavakları (2013), Leyla (2015), Kristal Kentler (2020), and Günbatımına Övgüler (2022). She worked as a philosophy teacher in Kabataş Erkek Lisesi from 2016 to 2022.
