= Birgül Oğuz =

Turkish writer

Birgül Oğuz (born 1981, Istanbul) is a Turkish writer. She was born in İstanbul and studied Comparative Literature and Cultural Studies at Istanbul Bilgi University. She also attended the University of Edinburgh in 2006.

She has published two works of fiction: Fasulyenin Bildiği (2007) and Hah (2012). The latter won the 2014 European Union Prize for Literature.
