= Mihri Hatun =

- Born: 1456/1461; Amasya, Ottoman Empire
- Died: After 1512; Amasya, Ottoman Empire
- Burial place: Pîr İlyas tekkesi
- Occupation: Poet
- Father: Kadı Hasan Amasyevî

Mihri Hatun (also known as Lady Mihri and Mihri Khatun, Ottoman Turkish: مهری خاتون; "sun/light"; 1456/1461- after 1512), was an Ottoman poet. She was the daughter of a kadi (an Ottoman judge) and was born in Amasya. According to sources, she spent most of her life in or near Amasya, in Anatolia. Documentation places her as a member of the literary circle of Şehzade Ahmed, the son of Sultan Bayezid II. She is referred to as the "Sappho of the Ottomans".

== Poetry ==
Mihrî Hatun first gained attention with her poetry, attracting the notice and favor of Şehzade Bayezid II, and became part of the circle of poets around him. She achieved her main fame within the literary environment of Bayezid II. Lady Mihri's poems reveal an artist grounded in both Turkish and Persian literature, writing in such forms as the Gazel, as well as the recipient of a deep literary education. Modern critics, such as Bernard Lewis, describe her style as “retaining remarkable freshness and simplicity.”

One of her more popular lines goes as follows:

“At one glance

I love you

With a thousand hearts

Let the zealots think

Loving is sinful

Never mind

Let me burn in the hellfire

Of that sin.”

Another is:

“My heart burns in flames of sorrow

Sparks and smoke rise turning to the sky

Within me the heart has taken fire like a candle

My body, whirling, is a lantern illuminated by your image.”

== Sources ==
- Damrosch and April Alliston. The Longman Anthology of World Literature: The 17th and 18th Centuries, the 19th Century, and the 20th Century: V. II (D, E, F) Longman, Inc. ISBN 0-321-20237-6
- Halman, Talât Sait and Jayne L. Warner. Nightingales & pleasure gardens: Turkish love poems. Syracuse University Press (2005) ISBN 0-8156-0835-7.
- Havlioğlu, Didem. “On the Margins and between the Lines: Ottoman Women Poets from the Fifteenth to the Twentieth Centuries.” Turkish Historical Review 1, no. 1 (n.d.): 25–54. https://www.academia.edu/806853/On_the_margins_and_between_the_lines_Ottoman_women_poets_from_the_fifteenth_to_the_twentieth_centuries
- Havlioglu, Didem. Poetic Voice En/Gendered: Mihri Hatun’s Resistance to ‘Femininity'. The Center for Middle Eastern Studies: Sohbet-i Osmani Series (2010).
- Lewis, Bernard. Music of a Distant Drum: Classical Arabic, Persian, Turkish, and Hebrew Poems. Princeton University Press; Ltr ptg edition. (2001). ISBN 0-691-08928-0
