= Zafer Hanım =

Turkish novelist

Zafer Hanım was the first Turkish novelist, writing one novel. Her birth and death dates are unknown. According to contemporaneous writer Mehmet Zihni, she was a member of Fuat Pasha's family. Her husband was Kabuli Pasha, who died before Zafer Hanım wrote her novel.

Zafer Hanım published her novel, named Aşk-ı Vatan (Love of Motherland), in 1877. It is about two slave girls (Turkish: cariye) named Gülbeyaz and Refia, who were Spaniards. According to Mehmet Zihni, the literary form of the novel was narration rather than fiction. Probably it was a narration of the true life story of two girls living in Laz Ahmet Pasha's house.

Zafer Hanım's long forgotten novel was unearthed by Zehra Toska of Boğaziçi University, who published the novel in 1994 (Oğlak Yayınları Publishing Co.).

Until recently Fatma Aliye, who wrote her first novel 14 years later than Zafer Hanım, was considered to be the first Turkish woman novelist. Now the critics disagree on who should be considered the first woman novelist. Since Zafer Hanım wrote only one novel, some critics still give priority to Fatma Aliye.
