= Üstün Bilgen-Reinart =

Turkish-Canadian writer, broadcaster and journalist (born 1947)

Night Spirits: The Story of the Relocation of the Sayisi Dene

Üstün Bilgen-Reinart (born 1947 in Ankara, Turkey) is a Turkish-Canadian writer, journalist and broadcaster, author of three notable books, the first two on the social and environmental dislocations associated with development in Canada and western Turkey, respectively on the ordeals experienced by the relocated Aboriginal peoples of Canada, the Sayisi Dene First Nation in Tadoule Lake, Manitoba, and then by Bergama villagers of Turkey's Aegean Region campaigning against gold mining in their land. Her latest book, the autobiographical "Porcelain Moon and Pomegranates: A Woman's Trek through Turkey" was published 2008.

== Biography ==
Bilgen-Reinart was born in Ankara. After her graduation from TED Ankara College, she went to Canada and pursued her studies and professional life there. She studied Literature and Sociology at the University of Winnipeg. She started working in the Canadian Broadcasting Corporation as a researcher, and then as broadcaster and producer.

In 1995, with a scholarship granted by the Canada Council for the Arts, she co-authored with Ila Bussidor, a Sayisi Dene, the story of the Sayisi Dene First Nation, an aboriginal community of Canada who were forcibly moved from their ancestral lands in 1956, and deported to and relocated in an urban environment. The book, which tells the story from the natives' own viewpoint, is titled Night Spirits: The Story of the Relocation of the Sayisi Dene. The relocation destroyed the independence of Sayisi Dene, ruined their way of life, and one-third of their population perished because of the unplanned, misdirected government action.

In 2003, Bilgen's second book was published, Biz Toprağı Bilirik! (Turkish: We Know the Land!), on the decade-long resistance of the population of 17 villages around Bergama in Turkey, close to Allianoi, against the gold mining activities of the company Eurogold in their land and to the nefarious consequences on the environment and on the villagers' traditional lifestyle, particularly due to the use of cyanide in the mining pit, now managed by Koza.

Currently, she teaches English at Middle East Technical University (METU), Ankara, and is also a free-lance writer for various portals such as openDemocracy.

In her new memoir, Porcelain Moon and Pomegranates, published in January 2007, Bilgen-Reinart describes a woman's trek through Turkey.

== Books ==
- Ila Bussidor - Üstün Bilgen-Reinart (1997). Night Spirits. Manitoba: University of Manitoba Press. ISBN 978-0-88755-643-2.
- Üstün Bilgen-Reinart (2003). Biz Toprağı Bilirik (We Know the Land) (in Turkish). Istanbul: Metis Publications. ISBN 975-342-425-6.
- Üstün Bilgen-Reinart (2007). Porcelain Moon and Pomegranates: A Woman's Trek Through Turkey. Dundurn Press. ISBN 978-1-55002-658-0. Canadian Bookshelf link
