= Lale Müldür =

Turkish poet and writer (b. 1956)

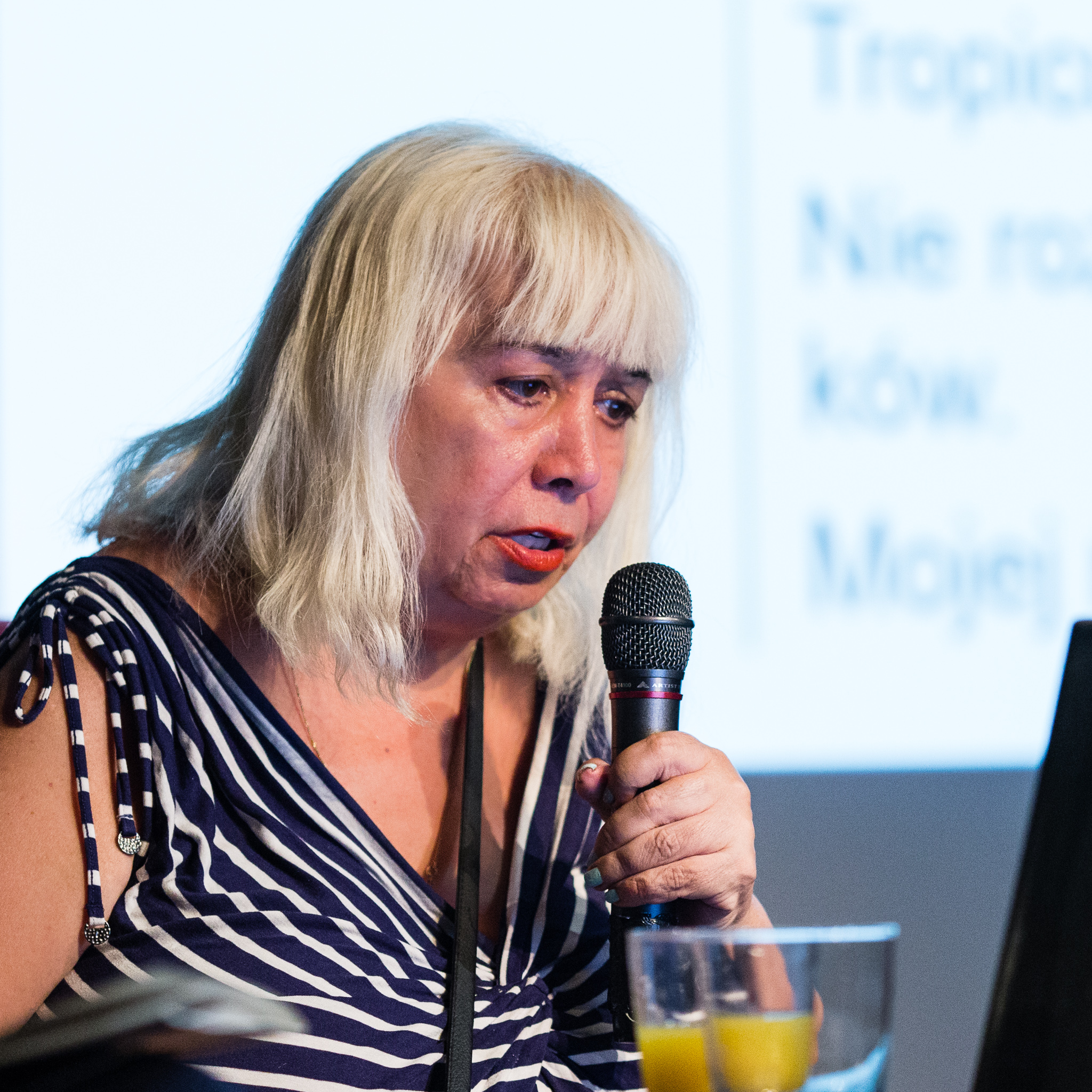
Lale Müldür, 2018

Lale Müldür (b. 1956, Aydın) is a Turkish poet and writer.

She finished high school at Robert College. She went to Florence, Italy, on a poetry scholarship. On her return to Turkey, she attended the Middle East Technical University Electronics and Economics departments for one year. She went to the UK in 1977 and received her BA from the Department of Economics at the University of Manchester and her master's degree from the Sociology of Literature at Essex University. She went to Brussels in 1983, marrying Belgian painter Patrick Jacquart. She lived here between 1983-1986. She returned home in 1986.

Her first poems were published in the magazines Yazı and Yeni Insan in 1980. Many of her poems and articles were published in the journals of Gösteri, Defter, Şiir Atı, Oluşum, Mor Köpük, Yönelişler, Sombahar . Some of her poems were composed and used in films.

A selection of her poems was published in Dublin under the name "Water Music" (Poetry Ireland, 1998). The poems she wrote on the paintings of the French painter Colette Deblé were published in French by the French Institute under the name "Yağmur Kızı Böyle Diyor" (Rain Girl Says So). She wrote in Radikal newspaper for a while. She represented Turkey in many meetings abroad. There is a poem that is considered one of the cornerstones of Turkish poetry, which is based on the concepts and resources of different cultures, which are unrelated to the lyricism of Turkish poetry and are fed more than the level of image or image. Her book Divanü lügat-it-Türk, which she wrote in 1998, was translated into French by a French Turkologist. It still receives offers from many foreign publishers. The translation of the poet's poetry book to be published in New York is in progress, and some of her poems are being translated into Hebrew in Israel. The title of the 13th Istanbul Biennial is the poet's "Mother, am I a barbarian?" Taken from the test book.

== Bibliography ==
=== Poetry ===
- Uzak Fırtına (1988)
- Voyıcır 2 (1990, written with Ahmet Güntan)
- Seriler Kitabı (1991)
- Kuzey Defterleri (1992)
- Buhurumeryem (1993)
- Divanü Lûgat-it-Türk (1998)
- Saatler / Geyikler (2001)
- Ultra-zone'da Ultrason (2006; Altın Portakal (Golden Orange) Poetry Award, 2007)
- Güneş Tutulması 1999 (2008)
- Medine ve Kavun Likörü (2009, written with Seyhan Özdamar)
- Siyah Sistanbul (2011)
- Anne'ye Ayetler ve O'nun Postmortem Alâmetleri (2012)
- Yağmur Kızı Böyle Diyor (2012)
- Anmenon-Toplu şiirler I (YKY)
- Apokalips/Amonyak-Toplu şiirler II (YKY)
- Leonardo (Karakarga Yay.)
- Tehlikeliydi Biliyorum (YKY)
- Milat (2020)

=== Fiction ===
- Bizansiyya, Yapı Kredi Publishing, 2007. ISBN 978-975-08-1188-3

=== Collected newspaper columns ===
- Anne Ben Barbar Mıyım? (1998)
- Haller Leyla (2006)
