= Treaty of Constantinople (1454) =

1454 treaty between the Ottoman Empire and the Republic of Venice

The Treaty of Constantinople was signed on April 18, 1454, between the Ottoman Empire and the Republic of Venice. It was the first treaty signed by Mehmed the Conqueror following the capture of Constantinople in 1453. It effectively ended Venetian aspirations to eliminate the Ottoman Empire or to conquer Constantinople on behalf of Christendom. The treaty gave the Republic of Venice freedom to trade in the Eastern Mediterranean.

== Aftermath ==
The Constantinople treaty of 1454 weakened considerably any prospects for an alliance of Italian princes against the Ottoman Empire - a cause espoused by Pope Nicholas V. It also aggravated relations between the Republic of Venice and the papacy.

== See also ==
- List of treaties
- Ottoman–Venetian wars

== For further reading ==
- Maria Pia Pedani, "Venetian Consuls in Egypt and Syria in the Ottoman Age"
