= The Sound of Fishsteps =

1993 novel by Buket Uzuner

- Paperback cover
- Author: Buket Uzuner
- Original title: Balık İzlerinin Sesi
- Translator: Pelin Arıner
- Language: Turkish
- Publisher: Remzi Kitabevi
- Publication place: Turkey
- English publication date: 2002
- Media type: Print (Paperback)
- Pages: 232 pp
- ISBN: 978-975-14-0843-3
- OCLC: 50318943
- LC Class: PL248.U984 B3513 2002

The Sound of Fishsteps (Balık İzlerinin Sesi in Turkish) is a prize-winning novel by Turkish writer Buket Uzuner originally published in Turkish by Remzi Kitabevi in 1993 and in English translation in 2002.

== Plot summary ==
Turkish prodigy Afife Piri, a descendant of Ottoman-Turkish cartographer Piri Reis, is invited, along with 87 other international selects, to take part in a UN sponsored retreat in an unnamed Scandinavian city. At the retreat she encounters a man claiming to be the French novelist Romain Gary, with whom she falls in love, and the descendants of other iconoclastic geniuses including Joan of Arc, Anaïs Nin, Jawaharlal Nehru and Edvard Grieg. The mysterious director of the retreat, Dr. Gunnar, however, has a secret agenda that is slowly revealed.

== Awards ==
- Awarded the 1993 Yunus Nadi Novel Prize.
