= Habesh Eyalet =

Administrative division of the Ottoman Empire from 1554 to 1872

Habesh Eyalet Arabic: إيالة الحبشة Ottoman Turkish: ایالت حبش Eyālet-i Ḥabeş
- Eyalet of the Ottoman Empire
- 1557–1802; 1813–1872
- Flag

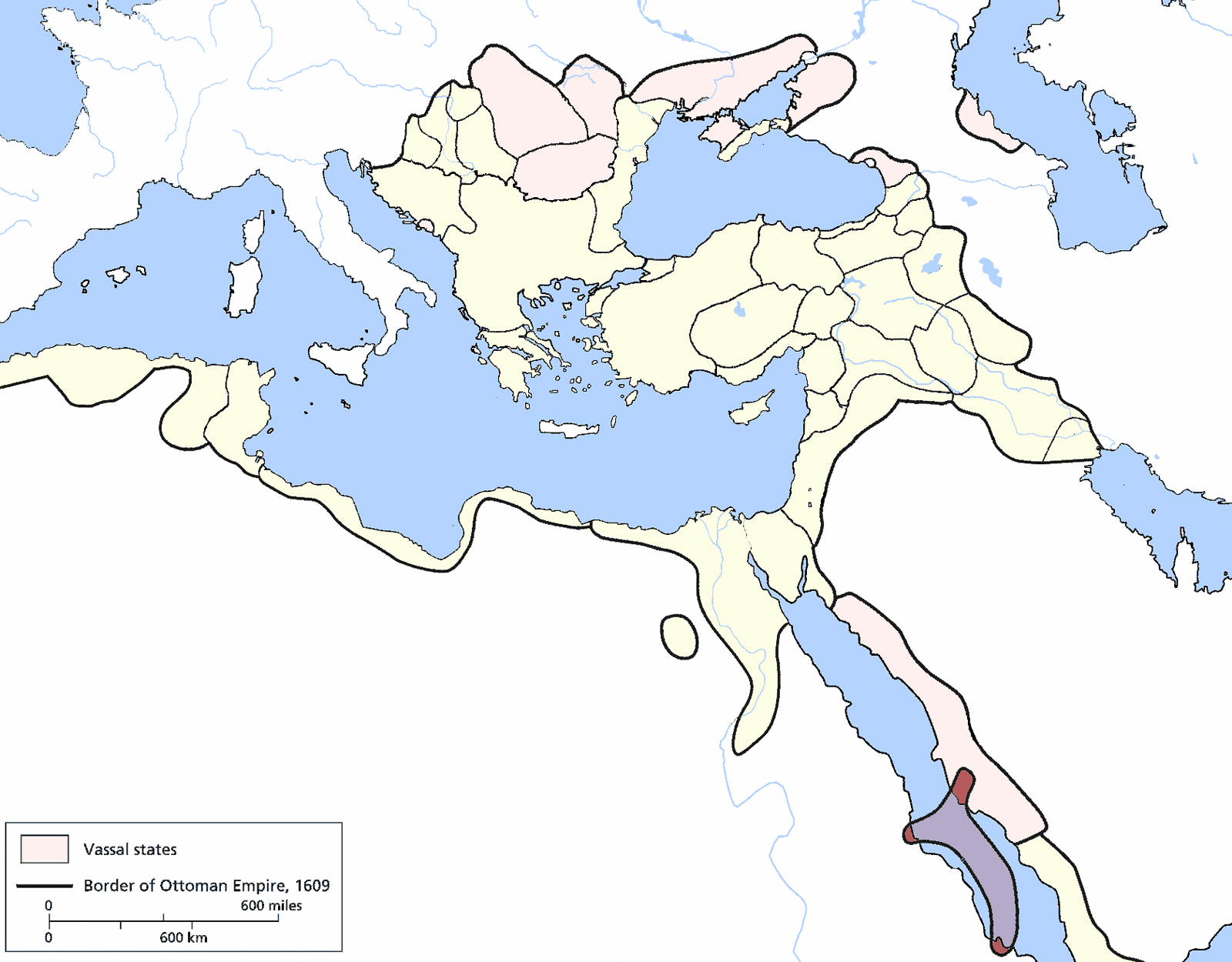
- The Eyalet of Jeddah-Habesh in 1609
- Capital: Sawakin, Jeddah
- Area
  - 1856: 503,000 km^{2} (194,000 sq mi)
- Population
  - 1866: 18,000
- History
  - Established: 1557
  - Disestablished: 1872
Preceded by
| Mamluk Sultanate |
| Ethiopian Empire |
| Adal Sultanate |
| Sultanate of Dahlak |
Succeeded by
| Khedivate of Egypt |
| Egypt Eyalet |
| Hejaz Vilayet |
| Emirate of Diriyah |
| Khedivate's Somali Coast |
- Today part of: Saudi Arabia; Sudan; Eritrea; Djibouti; Somalia

Habesh Eyalet (Arabic: إيالة الحبشة; Ottoman Turkish: ایالت حبش, romanized: Eyālet-i Ḥabeş) was an Ottoman eyalet. It was also known as the Eyalet of Jeddah and Habesh, as Jeddah was its chief town, and Habesh and Hejaz. It extended on the areas of coastal Hejaz and Northeast Africa of Eritrea that border the Red Sea basin. On the Northeast Africa littoral, the eyalet extended from Suakin and their hinterlands to Zeila.

Like Ottoman control in North Africa, Yemen, Bahrain, and Lahsa, the Ottomans had no "effective, long term control" outside of the ports where there was a direct Ottoman presence.

== History ==
=== Establishment ===
In 1517, the Ottoman Turks conquered the Mamluk Sultanate in Egypt and Syria, during the reign of Selim I. As such, territories of the Sultanate including Jeddah and Mecca were controlled by the Ottomans. Jeddah was then expanded for the purpose of protecting the borders of the Ottoman Empire from Portuguese invasions.

The Ottoman Empire then began extending its borders throughout the rest of the Red Sea coast. Muslim rulers from Sudan and the Arabian Peninsula were dominant in the African Red Sea coast until the Ottoman Turks arrived in the 16th century. The Adalites also lobbied for the Ottomans to expand in the region following their defeat by Abyssinia. The ports of Suakin and Massawa were occupied by Özdemir Pasha, who had been appointed beylerbey in 1555, and the province of Habesh was formed in 1557. Massawa being of secondary economical importance, the administrative capital was soon moved across the Red Sea to Jeddah (from the end of the 16th century until the early 19th century; Medina temporarily served as the capital in the 18th century).

The Ottoman Turks made multiple advances further inland conquering Eritrea. A sanjak of Ibrim was established in the 1560s. In 1571, the governor of Habesh moved to break a siege of Suakin by forces of the Funj Sultanate. The expansion was halted in 1578, and the Ottomans retired from most of the highlands. During the following centuries, the Ottoman administration largely refrained from further interventions, relying on a system of indirect rule. Only on the island of Massawa itself was there an Ottoman governor, who controlled trade and taxes; in Sawakin the Ottoman authorities appointed a customs officer.

There is very little in the way of source material for Ottoman rule in the eyalet of Habesh after the 16th century. Most of Cengiz Orhonlu's Ottoman sources on Habesh come from the late 16th century, with some from the 17th century. Despite the seminal nature of his Habesh Eyaleti, he could not "find precise data regarding the administrative and financial structure of the province" or information on any agricultural taxation.

=== Move of the seat to Jeddah ===
When the Ottomans became dominant in the Hejaz in 1517, Jeddah had been established as a sanjak under the authority of Beylerbeylik of Egypt. As Jeddah developed into an important centre of trade, the Ottomans turned Jeddah into a beylerbeylik itself. In the 18th century, it was attached to the eyalet of Habeş, and governors of the rank of vizier started to be appointed here.

In 1701, Suakin and the other Ottoman possessions on the African coast were put under the authority of the governor in Jeddah. After its combination with Jeddah, the eyalet gained importance. Owing to the great distance from the capital, the Ottomans had little control over the Pasha of Jeddah, and their authority over the region was mostly nominal.

In 1829, John Lewis Burckhardt described the pashalik of Jeddah as having been "reduced to perfect insignificance" by the power of the Sharif of Mecca, and the title was bestowed upon individuals who had never attempted to take possession of their governorship.

Even before the takeover by Wahhabi rebels of most of Hejaz in 1803, the appointment to the governorship of Jeddah was said to be little esteemed, and considered tantamount to exile. Burckhardt also noted that the Pasha styled himself wali (or governor) of not only Jeddah, but also Sawakin and Habesh, and he kept custom-house officers at Sawakin and Massawa.

When Muhammad Ali successfully fought the Ottoman–Saudi War, he received the administration of Habesh in 1813. His son Ahmad Tushun Pasha was appointed wali by a firman, thus also gaining control over the ports of Sawakin and Massawa. Muhammad Ali's control of Habesh was only temporary; after the Wahhabi emergence came to an end, it reverted to Ottoman rule in 1827. Massawa and Sawakin were given to him again in 1846, until his death in 1849.

In 1866, however, Habesh was taken away from Jeddah and formally incorporated into the Egyptian vice-kingdom as a separate entity. Thus Habesh ceased to exist in its traditional form and starting from 1869 was replaced by a series of subsequent Egyptian governorates. In 1871, after the removal from office of wali Hurşid Pasha, the position of the Jeddah wali was briefly abolished and the mutasarrıflık of Jeddah was installed in its place. This reorganization lasted only one year, and the walilik was brought back the following year. The Eyalet of Jeddah was then transformed into the Hejaz Vilayet, with a governor in Mecca.

== Administrative divisions ==
Sanjaks of the Eyalet:
1. Sanjak of Ibrim
2. Sanjak of Sawakin
3. Sanjak of Hargigo
4. Sanjak of Massawa
5. Sanjak of Zayla
6. Sanjak of Jeddah
Sanjaks in the 1860s:
1. Sanjak of Yemen (until c. 1849, then became the Eyalet of Yemen)
2. Sanjak of Najd
3. Sanjak of Mecca
4. Sanjak of Jeddah
5. Sanjak of Medina

== Importance ==
Specific Ottoman interest in Habeshistan arose from its pivotal geographic position in the region: it had ports and coastline on both the Red Sea (and near the Bab-el-Mandeb, where Ottoman blockades could be performed if necessary) and on the Indian Ocean (specifically Zeila and the Somali coast). The Ottoman navy was still relatively weak and in its infancy, so Ottoman land forces would have to capture key areas to ensure that the weak navy

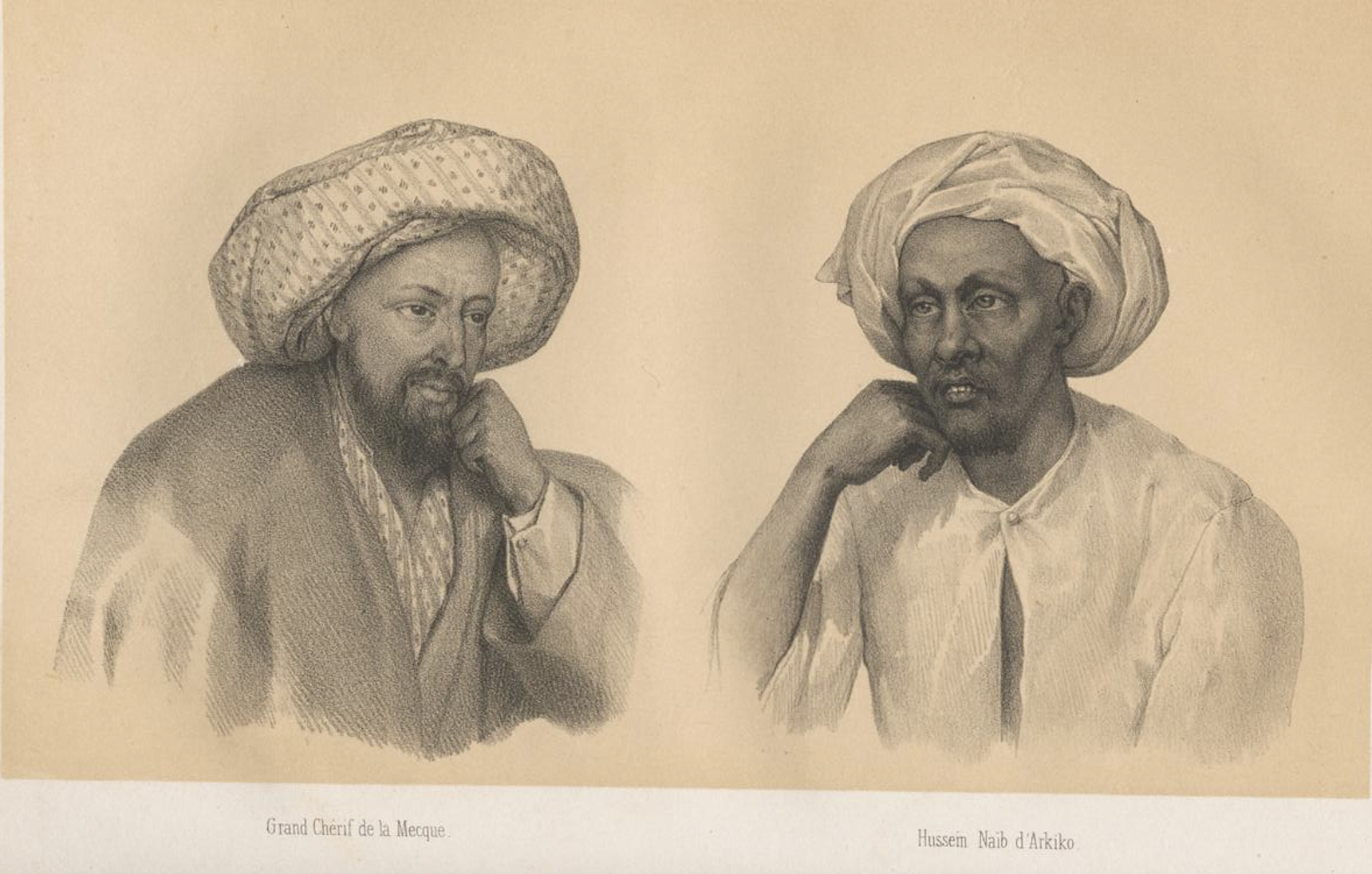
An illustration depicting the Sharif of Mecca (left) and the Naib of Arkiko (right) by Théophile Lefebvre.

would have some influence and strengthen. Selman also recognized a religious duty to conquer Habesh.

After the 1517 conquests, the Ottomans also were interested in the region because of the hajj. Having conquered the former Muslim defenders of the hajj, the Ottomans, being the successor of those states, was charged with protecting and providing safe passage to all undertaking the hajj. Portuguese hegemony in the Red Sea and Indian Ocean, however, gave them some control over hajjis. In the same vein, other Muslim states in the region saw the Ottomans as their defenders as Muslim brothers:

The Shah of Hormuz, Sharafaldin, wrote a letter to Sultan Süleyman to provide him with military help in order to expel the Portuguese from Hormuz. The ruler of Gujerat [Gujarat] also sought Ottoman military help.

Finally, there was a pre-emptive element to the Ottoman invasion of Ethiopia. If the Portuguese had built fortresses and taken control of the Red Sea ports first (especially Dahlak), they would have controlled the whole region, both directly and through their allies. Despite the possible economic gain from taxing Habesh proper, the Ottomans were more concerned with overcoming and outmaneuvering the Portuguese in the Red Sea and Indian Ocean.

=== Resources ===
Part of the reasoning behind Ottoman expansion was to aid fellow Muslim states in the new role it had taken on, but economic issues were pertinent as well. Though weapons were usually given unilaterally, the Muslim states could provide another source of revenue through the selling of firearms, as those were greatly in demand there. More important, however, was the Red Sea trade, despite its relatively small revenue. The Ottomans even constructed a canal some time after 1532 between the Nile and the Red Sea so that spices could go directly to Constantinople.

According to Dom Andre de Oviedo, the Ottomans were interested in the area because of the prospect of capturing slaves from other African regions via the ports. Then to use that for galleys, provisions, iron, and other goods. According to Selman Reis, an ambitious Ottoman Red Sea admiral, the coast (specifically the Dahlak Archipelago) was also rich with pearls, and the amount of merchandise and trade consisting of "gold, musk, and ivory" present at Berbera, on the Somali coast, was described by Selman as "limitless".

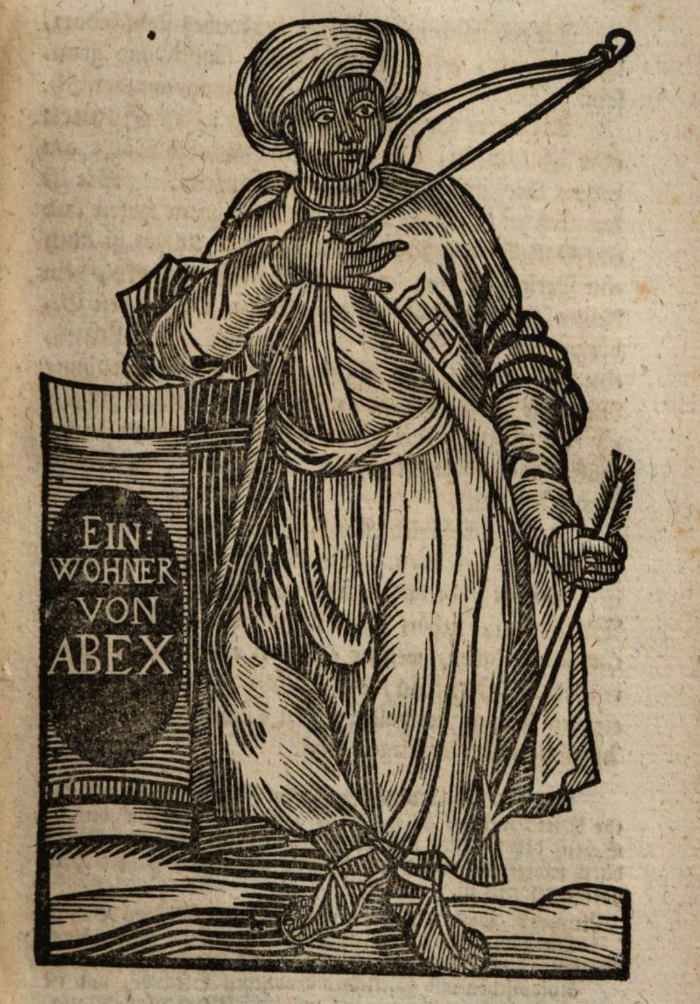
An inhabitant of the Habesh Eyalet by Georg Adam Dillinger (1773).

Despite the promises of Selman Reis, Habesh did not provide much revenue for the Ottomans, partly because the spice trade was not very profitable, but more importantly because the rich hinterlands were unconquered, with the Ottomans holding only the dry and hot coasts. Given that Yemen often cost more in upkeep than it sent to Constantinople as taxes, and that Habesh had much less in the way of agricultural taxes (but just as high a salary for the beylerbeyi), the province was probably very unprofitable.

Habesh, along with other 16th century conquests, was not under the timar system as were lands conquered in Europe and Anatolia. Rather, it was a salyaneli province, in which taxes "were collected directly for the centre and were transferred to the central treasury after the local expenses were deducted". Due to the aridity of the province, little in the way of taxes on agriculture were collected; the most important source of revenue was the customs duty collected through iltizam (tax farming) on goods flowing through Massawa, Beylul, and Suakin in Sudan. Individuals would be allowed to collect duties, but in return would have to send a specified amount to the Sultan every year.

Although Ottoman interest in Habesh had dwindled by the end of the 16th century, it was still strategically located and therefore still guarded by Ottoman galleys until the 17th century.
