= Milet Books =

UK publisher

Milet Publishing
- Country of origin: United Kingdom
- Headquarters location: Rudgwick
- Distribution: Roy Yates Books (UK); Independent Publishers Group (USA); Global Language Books (Australia); Sula Book Distributors (South Africa)
- Publication types: Books
- Official website: www.milet.com

Milet Publishing is a London publishing company that specialises in dictionaries and dual-language children’s literature.

== Bibliography ==
=== World Literature ===
A collection of English language translations of foreign language works.

- Atasü, Erendiz (2000). The Other Side of the Mountain. trans. Elizabeth Maslen with the author. ISBN 978-1-84059-113-2.
- Mağden, Perihan (2003). The Messenger Boy Murders. trans. Richard Hamer. ISBN 978-1-84059-364-8.
- Brocvelle, Vincent; Herve Tullet; Sarah Adams (2007). Hubbub. ISBN 978-1-84059-364-8.

==== Turkish-English Short Story Collections ====
A series of five dual language (Turkish-English) short story collections by prominent Turkish short story writers was published in 2001 by Milet Publishers in co-operation with Haringey, Hackney and Islington Libraries' Turkish Community Readers Development Project (funded by DCMS/Wolfson Public Libraries Challenge Fund).

The publisher describes the volumes as, “a series of unique and wonderful dual language books and audio cassettes for teenagers and adults that look at Turkish life from key angles – the familial, the social, the political.”

Marion James, writing in Sunday's Zaman, commends the format of “English on one side of the page and Turkish on the other,” for “making them ideal for the upper-intermediate or advanced student of either language to improve their comprehension skills and vocabulary.”

The series consists of the volumes;

- Füruzan (2001). A Summer Full of Love. trans. Damian Croft. ISBN 978-1-84059-301-3.
- Uzuner, Buket (2001). A Cup of Turkish Coffee. trans. Pelin Ariner. ISBN 978-1-84059-300-6.
- Izgü, Muzaffer (2001). Radical Niyazi Bey. trans. Damian Croft. ISBN 978-1-84059-299-3.
- Ilgaz, Rifat (2001). Fourth Company. trans. Damian Croft. ISBN 978-1-84059-298-6.
- Nesin, Aziz (2001). Out of the Way! Socialism's Coming. trans. Damian Croft. ISBN 978-1-84059-297-9.
