= Füruzan =

Turkish writer (1932–2024)

Füruzan Selçuk
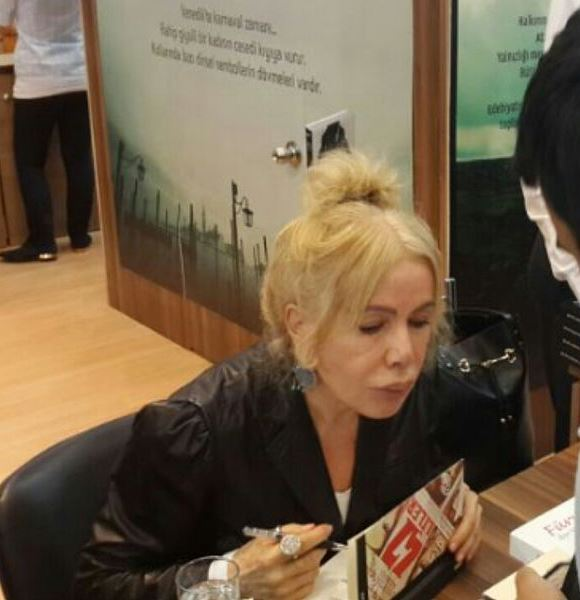
- Fürüzan in 2013
- Born: Feruze Çerçi; 29 October 1932; Istanbul, Turkey
- Died: 11 February 2024 (aged 91); Istanbul, Turkey
- Occupation: Writer
- Spouse: Turhan Selçuk (m. 1958)
- Children: 1
- Writing career
- Pen name: Füruzan
- Notable work: A Summer Full of Love

Füruzan (born Feruze Çerçi, 29 October 1932 – 11 February 2024) was a Turkish self-taught writer, who was highly regarded for her sensitive characterisations of the poor and her depictions of Turkish immigrants abroad.

== Biography ==
Born in Istanbul, Turkey as Feruze Çerçi, she enjoyed reading as a child but left school in the eighth grade following the death of her father. She worked as an actress with the Little Theater acting company and began writing poems and short stories. She married cartoonist Turhan Selçuk in 1958 and the couple had a daughter before they divorced. She became a full-time writer following her divorce in 1968.

She published her first collection of short stories Parasiz Yatili (Free Boarding School) in 1971 and was awarded the Sait Faik Short Story Award. She published her first novel 47’liler (Those Born in ’47) in 1975 won and was awarded the Turkish Language Association Novel Award. Füruzan died in her birthplace, Istanbul, on 11 February 2024, at the age of 91. Her funeral was organised at Zincirlikuyu Mosque on February 16, 2024 and she was buried in Zincirlikuyu Cemetery.

== English language bibliography ==
One collection of Füruzan's short stories has been published in English translation.

=== A Summer Full of Love ===
A 2001 short story collection by Turkish writer Füruzan published by Milet Books, in dual Turkish and English translation by Damian Croft, as part of its series of Turkish-English Short Story Collections.

A review in Write Away states that the style of the work, "is an excellent introduction to the techniques of short story writing, and encourages a realization of the different parameters that this genre requires", before concluding that this is, [a] challenging and immensely rewarding read..."

==== Editions ====
- A Summer Full of Love. trans. Damian Croft. London: Milet Books. 2001. ISBN 978-1-84059-301-3.

=== On-line translations ===
- The River at Boğaziçi University.
- In the Park by the Pier at Boğaziçi University.

== Bibliography ==
=== Short story collections ===
- Parasiz Yatili (Free Boarding School) (1971)
- Kusatma (The Siege) (1972),
- Benim Sinemalarim (My Cinemas) (1973),
- Gecenin Oteki Yuzu (The Other Face of the Night) (1982),
- Gul Mevsimidir (It’s the Season for Roses) (1985).
- "Su Ustası Miraç"

=== Novels ===
- 47’liler (Those Born in ’47) (1975),
- Berlin’in Nar Cicegi (The Pomegranate Blossom of Berlin) (1988).

== Filmography ==
- Sira sende fistik (1971, as actress)
- Ah güzel Istanbul (1981, as writer)
- Benim sinemalarim (My Cinemas) (1990, as writer & director)

== Awards ==
- Awarded the 1971 Sait Faik Short Story Award for Parasiz Yatili (Free Boarding School)
- Awarded the 1975 Turkish Language Association Novel Award for 47’liler (Those Born in ’47 )
