= Reis (military rank) =

Ottoman Turkish title and naval rank

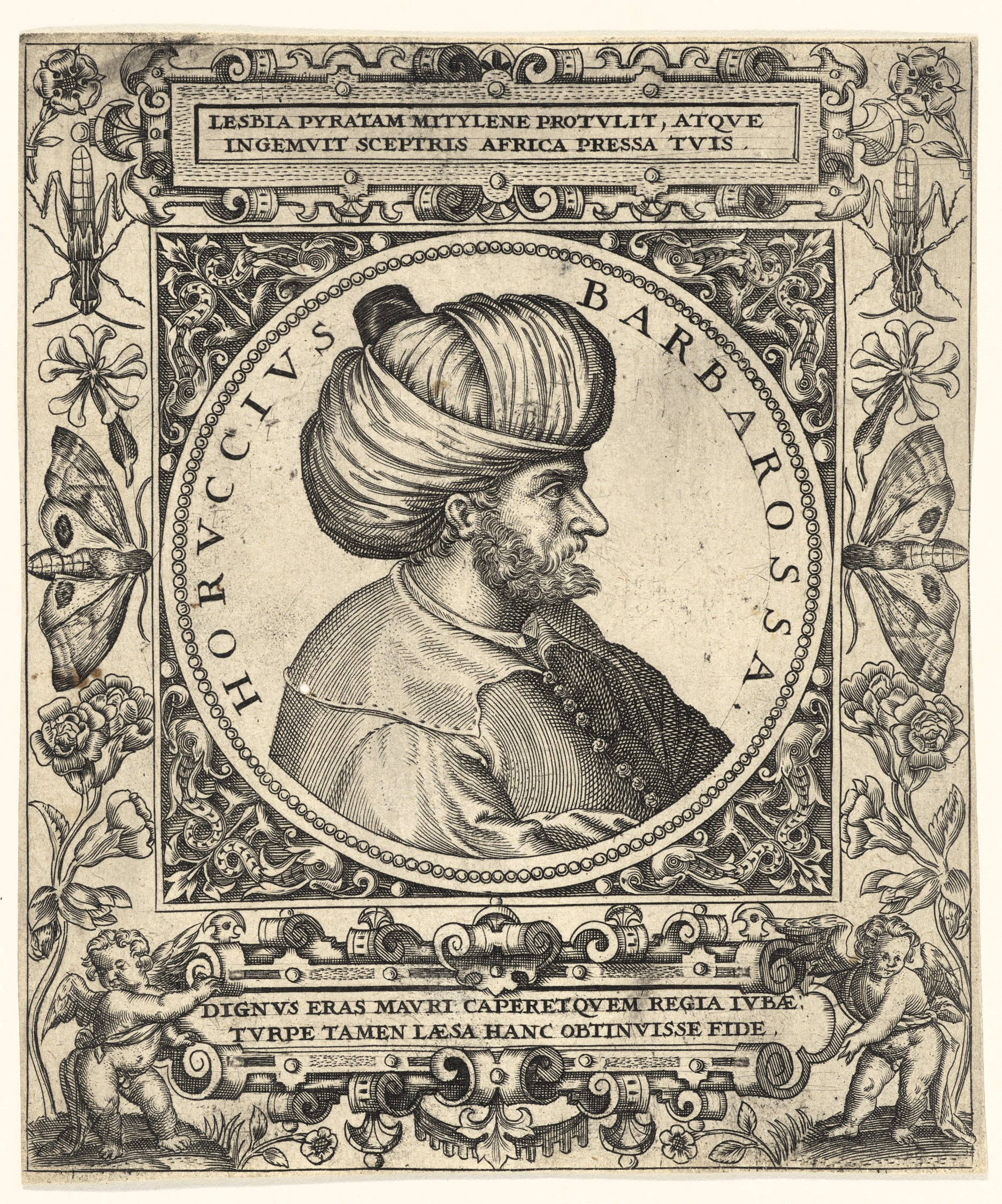
Oruç Reis

Reis (Ottoman Turkish: رئيس raʾīs; sometimes spelled rais) was a military rank in the Ottoman Empire, akin to that of a naval captain or (in the Levant) a commodore, which was commonly added to the officer's name as an epithet during the Ottoman Empire. Examples include:

- Piri "Reis"
- Turgut "Reis"
- Uluç Ali "Reis"
- Hizir "Reis"
- Seydi Ali "Reis"
- Oruç "Reis"

The rank Reis Pasha referred to an Admiral, while the Kapudan Pasha (akin to Grand Admiral; literally "Captain Pasha") title referred to the commander-in-chief of the Ottoman Navy fleet.

The title is also a low ranking aristocratic title in Lebanon and Syria's coastlines denoting a landed or formerly landed family that swore fealty to Fakhr al-Din II during their alliance with the Medici in the 17th century. It is roughly equivalent to a Baron, however titles of the Ottoman and subordinate nobility rarely translate to Western peerages. The only extant "Ru'assa" in Lebanon are the "House of El Azzi" in Tabarja who escaped persecution in the 19th century and abandoned their ancestral homes in the Chouf.

== See also ==
- Reis ül-Küttab – Senior administrative post in the Ottoman government
- Reis-ul-ulema – Head of a riyasat, an executive body of Balkan Muslim communities
- Imperial, royal and noble ranks
