= Buket Uzuner =

Turkish writer

Buket Uzuner (born 3 October 1955, in Ankara, Turkey) is a Turkish writer, author of novels, short stories, and travelogues. She studied biology and environmental science and has conducted research and presented lectures at universities in Turkey, Norway, the United States, and Finland. Her works have been translated into eight languages: Spanish, English, Italian, Greek, Romanian, Hebrew, Korean, and Bulgarian.

== Biography ==
Since the 1980s, Buket Uzuner has travelled as a "solo woman backpacker" including "inter-rail" tours in Europe and three other continents where she keeps writing her travel memoirs. Her first travelogue, The Travel Notes of A Brunette, (1988) sold more than 300,000 copies. Uzuner then wrote two more travel books: Travel Notes of An Urban Romantic, which questions the meaning of exoticism, and New York Logbook, which are all collected lately in the Travel Library of Buket Uzuner.

Her first novel, "İki Yeşil Susamuru, Anneleri, Babaları, Sevgilileri ve Diğerleri" (Two Green Otters, Mothers, Fathers, Lovers and All the Others; 1991) reached its 50th edition in 2013 and has sold over one million copies.

Uzuner's books have been on the Turkish best-seller lists since 1992. They are taught in several Turkish Universities and High Schools.

Her novel “The Sound of Fishsteps” (1993), was awarded Turkey's Yunus Nadi Prize, while her novel ”Mediterranean Waltz” (1998) was named novel of the year by the University of Istanbul. She was made an honorary member of the International Writing Program of the University of Iowa in 1996. She was also honoured with a certificate of appreciation from the Senate of Middle East Technical University in 2004.

She has referred to Turkish Writers Attilâ İlhan and Sevgi Soysal, as well as Miguel de Cervantes, Fyodor Dostoevsky, and Doris Lessing, as major influences on her work.

In September 2020, Uzuner sued the producer of Netflix TV Series Atiye (The Gift) claiming that the characters were copied from her novel Toprak in the Adventures of Defne Kaman series without her permission. She requested an injunction as well as a total of $6,600 compensation from the producer's company and Netflix.

== English language bibliography ==
Five of Uzuner's novels and one short story collection have been published in English language translation.

=== Mediterranean Waltz ===
Mediterranean Waltz (Turkish title: "Kumral Ada – Mavı Tuna") is a 1997 novel by Buket Uzuner, which was awarded the 1998 Novel Prize of Istanbul University and was republished in 2000 by Remzi Kitabevi in English language translation by Pelin Ariner.

- Editions: Mediterranean Waltz. Translated by Pelin Ariner. Istanbul: Remzi Kitabevi. 2000. ISBN 975-289-073-3.

=== A Cup of Turkish Coffee ===
A 2001 short story collection by Buket Uzuner published by Milet Books, in dual Turkish and English language translation by Pelin Ariner, as part of its series of Turkish-English Short Story Collections. The publisher states that the author:

"takes us into the memories and dreams of children and adults, and explores shared history, love and attachments – to family, lovers and places." Whilst a review in Writing in Education concludes that the author, "in The Other Twin notably, is subtle, penetrating about human nature, and well able to project a powerful maxim or a sarcastic image."

- Editions: A Cup of Turkish Coffee. Translated by Pelin Ariner. London: Milet Books. 2001. ISBN 978-1-84059-300-6.

=== The Sound of Fishsteps ===
The Sound of Fishsteps (Turkish: Balık İzlerinin Sesi) is a 1993 novel by Buket Uzuner, which was awarded the 1993 Yunus Nadi Novel Prize and was republished in 2002 by Remzi Kitabevi in English language translation by Pelin Ariner.

- Editions: The Sound of Fishsteps. Translated by Pelin Ariner. Istanbul: Remzi Kitabevi. 2002. ISBN 975-14-0843-1.

=== The Long White Cloud – Galipoli ===
The Long White Cloud – Galipoli (Turkish: Uzun Beyaz Bulut – Gelibolu) is a 2001 novel by Buket Uzuner, which was a National Bestseller and was republished in 2002 by Remzi Kitabevi in English language translation by Pelin Ariner.

- Editions: The Long White Cloud – Galipoli. Translated by Pelin Ariner. Istanbul: Remzi Kitabevi. 2002. ISBN 975-289-173-X.

=== Istanbullu ===
Istanbullu is a 2007 novel by Buket Uzuner, which was republished in 2008 by Everest Yayınlari in English language translation by Kenneth Dakan.

- Editions: Istanbullu. Translated by Kenneth Dakan. Istanbul: Everest Yayinlari. 2008. ISBN 978-9752895331.

=== Online translations ===
- An Unbearable Passion of a Young Man at buketuzuner.com.
- The Sun Eating Gypsy at buketuzuner.com.
- The Hall at buketuzuner.com.
- The Mysterious Passenger at the Spanish Border at buketuzuner.com.
- My Soul-mate Istanbul, Ex-Husband Paris and Lover New York (Extract from New York Log Book) at buketuzuner.com.
- The Princess with a Gypsy Heart (Extract from New York Log Book) at buketuzuner.com.

== Bibliography ==
=== Novels ===
- Two Green Otters, Their Mothers, Their Fathers, Their Lovers, and the Others – 1991
- The Sound of Fishsteps – 1993
- Mediterranean Waltz – 1997
- Long White Cloud-Gallipoli – 2001
- Istanbullites – 2007
- WATER: The Adventures of Misfit Daphne Shaman – 1st Book (2012)
- EARTH: The Adventures of Misfit Daphne Shaman – 2nd book (2015)

=== Short story collections ===
- My name is May – 1986
- The Most Naked Day of the Month – 1988
- The Sun Eating Gypsy – 1989
- The Sorrow of the Northwest Wind – 1993
- The City of Poets – 1994
- Tale, The Sister of Verse – 2003
- Istanbul Blues – 2004
- Yolda on the road – 2009

=== Travel writing ===
- The Travel Notes of a Brunette – 1989
- The Diary of an Urban Romantic – 1998
- New York Logbook – 2000

=== Biography ===
- Silver Summer, Silver Girl – 2000

=== Essay ===
- Travels with Selin and Cem – 2003

=== Interviews ===
- Turkey and the Iraqi war, an interview with Pia Ingström, 5 May 2003
