= RV K. Piri Reis =

Turkish multi-purpose research vessel

History

Turkey
- Name: K. Piri Reis
- Namesake: Piri Reis
- Owner: Dokuz Eylül University
- Operator: Institute of Marine Sciences and Technology
- Builder: Schiffswerft Diedrich, West Germany
- Launched: June 1978
- Home port: Urla, İzmir
- Identification: IMO number: 7614783; MMSI Number 271015037; Callsign TC3163
- Status: In active service

General characteristics
- Type: Oceanographic research ship
- Tonnage: 289 GT; 87 NT
- Length: 36 m (118 ft 1 in)
- Beam: 8.05 m (26 ft 5 in)
- Height: 3.8 m (12 ft 6 in)
- Draft: 2.8 m (9 ft 2 in) (max.)
- Installed power: 610 hp (450 kW)
- Propulsion: Diesel engine
- Speed: 9 knots (17 km/h) (service)
- Endurance: 20 days autonomous
- Complement: 11 scientists
- Crew: 10
- Armament: None

RV K. Piri Reis (full name Koca Piri Reis) is a Turkish multi-purpose research vessel owned by Dokuz Eylül University in İzmir and operated by its Institute of Marine Sciences and Technology. Built in West Germany and launched in 1978, she was named in honor of Piri Reis, the Ottoman naval captain and renowned cartographer.

== Characteristics ==
K. Piri Reis was built in June 1978 at the Schiffswerft Diedrich Oldersum in West Germany. She is 36 m (118 ft 1 in) long, with a beam of 8.05 m (26 ft 5 in) and a draught of 3.4 m (11 ft 2 in). Assessed at 289 GT and 87 NT, the ship is propelled by a 610 hp (450 kW) MWM Suddeutsche Brimsen AG MWM TD 602 V12 diesel engine. She has a speed of 9 knots (17 km/h) in service.

The ship's crew consists of 10 seamen, and she carries 11 scientists aboard. K. Piri Reis has an autonomous endurance of 20 days.

== Scientific work ==
The ship is equipped with modern instruments and a laboratory to carry out research work in various fields like oceanography, marine biology, undersea geology, geophysics for oil and gas exploration and earthquake engineering.

== Political dimension of her activity ==
The research activities performed by the vessel have sometimes beside its scientific and economic dimensions also political extent with diplomatic or military tone.

She was sent in 1987 to Aegean Sea after Greece announced that it will start oil and gas exploration in the region. As Greece declared to intervene, Turkey responded that this would be cause of war. The tension calmed down later with mediation efforts of NATO and the United States.

== 2011 Eastern Mediterranean mission ==
Following the decision of the Cyprus government to start an initiative for oil and gas exploration in the Mediterranean Sea, Turkey signed an agreement with Northern Cyprus to do the same within Northern Cyprus' territorial waters. For this purpose, K. Piri Reis, which was commissioned by the Turkish government to conduct research work, departed on September 23, 2011 from its homeport in Urla, İzmir Province and headed for Eastern Mediterranean.

== See also ==
- List of research vessels of Turkey
