= Muzaffer İzgü =

Turkish writer and teacher

- Born: 29 October 1933; Adana, Turkey
- Died: 26 August 2017 (aged 83); İzmir, Turkey
- Occupation: Writer
- Writing career
- Notable work: Radical Niyazi Bey

Muzaffer İzgü ([muˈzaffeɾ izˈɟy]; 29 October 1933 – 26 August 2017) was a Turkish writer and teacher. He was known for his children's books and works of humour, and had authored 154 books, 98 of which were for children.

== Life ==
İzgü was born in Adana on 29 October 1933 to a poor family, and as a child he had to work as a waiter, dishwasher, and beverage vendor at the cinemas while furthering his education. His father, Ahmet İzgü, was born in Damascus and had come to Adana from Elazığ to find employment. He worked at the Adana Girls' High School as a steward, and Muzaffer İzgü has claimed that his father was the builder of the first gecekondu in Adana. His mother, Havva, was from Antakya. He completed his primary education in Adana: the first three years at the İnönü Primary School, the fourth year at the Gazipaşa Primary School, and after the destruction of the school in an earthquake, the fifth and final year in the İstiklal Primary School. He then completed the Tepebağ Middle School.

He was graduated from Diyarbakır School for Primary School Teachers, a boarding school, and started working as a primary school teacher. He served at various locations in Turkey: in Silvan, in the Akçakoca and Cincin villages of Aydın, at an orphans' asylum in the city of Aydın, and at the primary school of Güzelhisar. He then studied at the Institute of Education and went on to teach Turkish at middle school level.

He retired in 1978 and moved to the Bozkaya neighbourhood of İzmir.

He was diagnosed with cancer in İzmir in July 2016, and died of the disease on 26 August 2017.

== Works ==
İzgü started writing when he worked as a teacher in Aydın; his first works were published in the local newspaper, Hüraydın, in 1959. These works consisted of short stories and interviews. In 1964, he started writing at the newspaper, Demokrat İzmir, writing weekly short stories. Around this time, his works started appearing in the humour periodical, Akbaba. He then had his interviews published at the national newspapers, Milliyet and Cumhuriyet. His works appeared at the humour sections of these newspapers, as well as the İzmir newspaper, Yeni Asır, and the journals Çivi, Dönemeç, Milliyet Sanat, and Yansıma.

His first book, Gecekondu, was published in 1970 by Remzi Kitabevi. This was followed by İlyas Efendi (1971) and Halo Dayı (1972). After meeting with Atilla İlhan, he published all his works at Bilgi Kitabevi, with his first work at this publishing house being Donumdaki Para in 1977. He wrote two autobiographic works, Zıkkımın Kökü ("The Root of the Poison") and Ekmek Parası ("Breadwinning"). He has also authored plays.

His works draw attention to social problems and criticise widespread value judgements. A number of his works have been listed as recommended books by the Turkish Ministry of National Education. His works have also garnered a number of prizes:

- 1977 – Nasreddin Hoca National Humorous Short Story Contest, third place with Hıdır Baba
- 1977 – Milliyet Sanat Humorous Short Story Contest, second place with Anayasa, Hangi Anayasa ("Constitution? Which Constitution?")
- 1978 – Turkish Language Association Story Award with Donumdaki Para
- 1980 – Bulgarian Golden Hedgehod Award with Dayak Birincisi
- 1980 – Istanbul International Children's Books Fair Award, first place with Uçtu Uçtu Ali Uçtu
- 1997 – TÖMER Most Successful Children's Books Contest, second place

=== Works translated to English ===
Radical Niyazi Bey is a 2001 collection of his stories by Milet Books, in dual Turkish and English language translation by Damian Croft, as part of its series of Turkish-English Short Story Collections. The publisher commends the author's, "deft and perceptive comic touch", as, "he even gives a lesson on how to cross the road in Turkey without getting run over!" During which, according to Marion James, writing in Sunday's Zaman, "Six pages of wit, sharp insight into cultural differences and dialog that makes the reader laugh out loud follow until our hero finally learns the trick."

Marion James goes on to state, "İzgü presents the normal everyday of Turkish culture with a comic touch. His perception is amazing, and in the first of five stories collected here, Letter from an Englishman, he manages the rare skill of stepping out of his shoes and viewing himself as others see him." A review in Writing in Education states that the author, “produces incredibly funny social commentary.”

Devoted Moslem Ismail Effendi is also available as an online translation.

== Personal life ==
İzgü was married to Günsel İzgü, whom he met when he studied in Diyarbakır. Their first child, Bülent, was born in Silvan. They then had twin daughters, Nevin and Sevin, during the time when they served in Aydın.
