= Piri Reis =

Ottoman admiral and cartographer

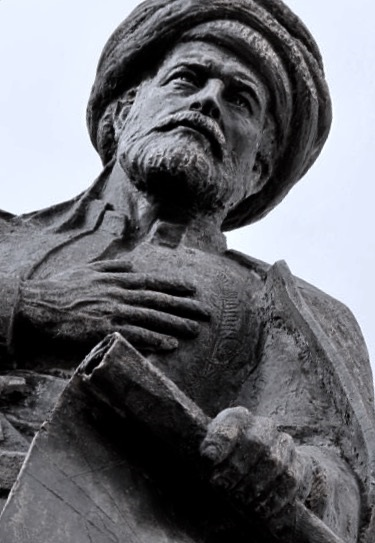
- Statue of Piri Reis in Karaman, Turkey
- Born: Muhiddin Piri c. 1465–1470; Ottoman Empire
- Died: 1553; Cairo, Egypt Eyalet, Ottoman Empire
- Cause of death: Execution by beheading
- Notable work: 1513 world map; Kitab-ı Bahriye
- Relatives: Kemal Reis (uncle)

Piri Reis (Turkish: Pîrî Reis; born Muhiddin Piri c. 1465–1470; died 1553) was an Ottoman Turkish cartographer, admiral, and corsair. He is best known for his 1513 world map and his nautical atlas, the Kitab-ı Bahriye (Book of the Sea). His cartography engaged more directly with the Age of Discovery than other Ottoman works from the period. His maps provide a glimpse into the world during a time of major geopolitical change, when the Americas were explored and the Ottoman Empire came to dominate the Eastern Mediterranean.

Piri Reis began his maritime career sailing with his uncle, the corsair Kemal Reis, with whom he entered Ottoman naval service. He later commanded his own ship in the Ottoman–Venetian wars and, after his uncle's death, began the cartographic work. After blockading the port of Alexandria during the 1517 conquest of Egypt, Piri Reis presented his world map as a gift to Selim I, and he dedicated his atlases to Selim's successor, Suleiman the Magnificent. Decades later, as grand admiral of the Ottoman fleet in the Indian Ocean, Piri Reis led successful campaigns in the Red Sea, but was beheaded following his retreat from the siege of Hormuz.

During his lifetime, Piri Reis's cartography received little appreciation, but many copies of the Kitab-ı Bahriye were produced after his death. The 1929 rediscovery of his first world map, during renovations to the Topkapı Palace in Istanbul, sparked interest in his work largely because it cites a now-lost map by Christopher Columbus. While the rediscovery made his achievements a point of national pride for Turkey, the map became the subject of fringe theories based on the disproven hypothesis that it depicted an ice-free Antarctica. Studies have shown no significant similarities between the map's southern coastline and Antarctica's coast beneath the ice. Nevertheless, this speculation has broadened popular interest in his work.

== Early life and piracy ==
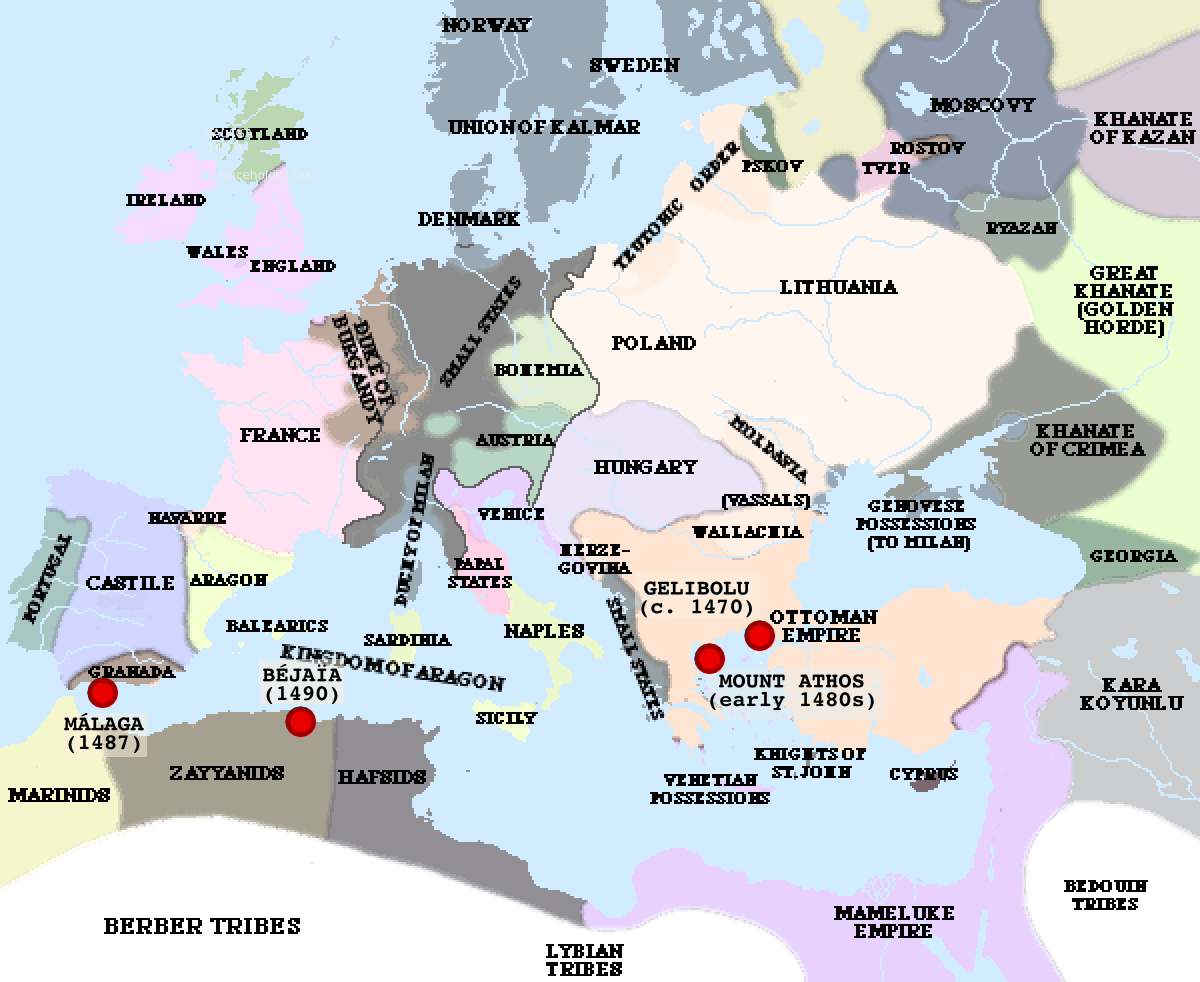
The Mediterranean in 1470, showing locations from Piri Reis's early life

The only surviving primary sources covering Piri Reis's early life are his own cartographic works, in which he identifies himself as Muhiddin Piri, son of Hacı Mehmed. Piri Reis was likely born between 1465 and 1470 in Gelibolu (Gallipoli), in present-day Turkey. This was a major naval base for the Ottoman Empire, a Muslim power in the Mediterranean spanning from Anatolia in Asia into Eastern Europe. The 16th-century Ottoman historian Ibn Kemal wrote that Gelibolu had a strong maritime tradition where the town's children were "rocked to sleep with the lullaby of the sea and of the ships day and night"—a culture that, according to Turkish historian Afet İnan, shaped his upbringing.

His uncle Kemal Reis was a notable corsair, a type of state-sanctioned pirate, often operating along religious lines in the Mediterranean. Serving under Kemal, he earned the rank of reis himself, equivalent to a captain.

Cartography scholar Ibrahim Yilmaz suggests Piri Reis's parents likely died around 1481, after which he began working aboard his uncle's ship. (Note: It is unclear from historical records how Muhiddin Piri was related to Kemal Reis, whether he was Kemal Reis's paternal or maternal nephew. In his 1513 world map, Muhiddin Piri described himself as Kemal Reis's biraderzade, or brother's son. In his 1528 world map, he wrote in the colophon, "Harrerehu hüvelehu hakir piri reis bin el haci Mehmet el mütehir birader zade-i merhum reis gazi Kemal an ehri Gelibolu, sene hamse selâsin ve tisa mia" as McIntosh transcribes it. Historian Svat Soucek translates this colophon as, "Drawn by the lowly Piri Reis, son of el-Haci Mehmed, known as the paternal nephew of the late Reis Gazi Kemal, from the city of Gallipoli, in the year of 935" However, Pedani notes that 17th-century Turkish scholar Kâtip Çelebi wrote, "Piri reis Kemal reis'in hemşirezadesidir", which she translates as "Piri Reis the son of Kemal Reis's sister". The number and gender of Kemal Reis's siblings are unknown. The only family member mentioned in Venetian documents is a cognato, or brother-in-law, named Eustachio Sparcina, who was arrested for spying, tortured, and released.) Years later, Piri Reis described how, shortly after he began sailing with his uncle, a storm nearly destroyed Kemal Reis's galley in a small stony harbor near Mount Athos in present-day Greece. While they were sheltering from rough seas, Eastern Orthodox monks came to the water with ropes and tied the galley down until the storm passed.

Under Sultan Bayezid II's approval, Piri Reis sailed west with Kemal Reis and other Ottoman corsairs to fight the Iberian Catholic Monarchs and aid the Emirate of Granada, the last Muslim-ruled territory in Iberia. As a young man, he helped his uncle bombard the forces besieging Málaga in 1487.

By the end of 1487, Málaga fell to the combined Catholic armies. Barbary corsairs based in northern Africa and led by Kemal Reis continued to threaten European maritime traffic. Corsairs differed from typical privateers because they operated outside a defined time of war. The perpetual Holy War in the Mediterranean gave them an indefinite license. Piri Reis described himself and his uncle as "sea gazis". He wrote: "We sailed on the Mediterranean and fought the enemies of our religion mercilessly." During the winters, they took shelter in harbors along the Barbary Coast of North Africa, including Béjaïa and Annaba in present-day Algeria. For six years, they sailed north to raid the coasts of Spain and France, as well as the islands lying between Europe and Africa: Corsica, Sardinia, Sicily, and the Balearics.

Drawing from firsthand experiences, Piri Reis recorded life on the Balearic Islands during the final years of Muslim rule in Iberia. Near the piers of Ibiza, he observed ships loading salt and noted that there were more "Turkish and Arab captives in this salt mine" than anywhere else in the islands. He wrote that in the Gulf of Mahón on Menorca, a fig tree marked a natural spring where there was "never any lack of Arab or Turkish" ships, as a large mountain obscured this spring from the nearby castle. He described the rivers of Mallorca and praised its olive oil. Invasive rabbits overran the tiny islet of Cabrera off Mallorca's coast, and the galley's crew "caught three hundred seventy or so" on a hunting trip. While sheltering in a cove on Mallorca, the Turks were caught unaware by Christian corsairs. A young Muhiddin Piri watched "eleven of [his] comrades" die in the fight.

Granada fell in 1492. Many Muslims fled Iberia rather than remain as Mudéjars, permitted to practice their religion but denied full participation in Catholic Spanish society. When Spain expelled its Jewish population outright in 1492, Sultan Bayezid II instructed Kemal Reis to aid religious refugees. In response, Piri Reis ferried Muslims and Jews from Spain to North Africa.

== Naval career and cartography ==
Locations from Piri Reis's life on the coasts of present-day Greece and Turkey

Like many Ottoman corsairs of the period, Piri Reis and his uncle were recruited into the Ottoman Navy by Bayezid II. (Note: Kemal Reis did serve in some official status in Ottoman naval forces before fighting as a corsair with Piri Reis. The 1475 Gallipoli Tahrir Register lists Kemal Reis as a galley captain, and he is recorded taking part in the campaign to take Euboea. They participated in the 1487 naval mission to assist Granada with Bayezid II's approval, though whether Kemal Reis led the expedition or was only one of the many corsairs is unclear. Piri Reis wrote that 1495 marked the beginning of his and Kemal Reis's formal service to the Ottoman sultan.) For Kemal Reis and his contemporaries, the boundaries between outright piracy, state-sponsored corsairing, and formal naval service were fluid.

After Kemal Reis was imprisoned for piracy in 1495, the sultan granted him an official position in the navy instead of further punishment. As recorded in the Kitab-ı Bahriye, Kemal Reis and Piri Reis advised the sultan to take the strategically valuable island of Rhodes. Just 20 km (12 mi) off the coast of Anatolia, Rhodes was close enough to threaten the sea lanes between the empire's European capital and its Mediterranean ports. They also advocated seizing the Venetian coastal fortresses on the Peloponnese.

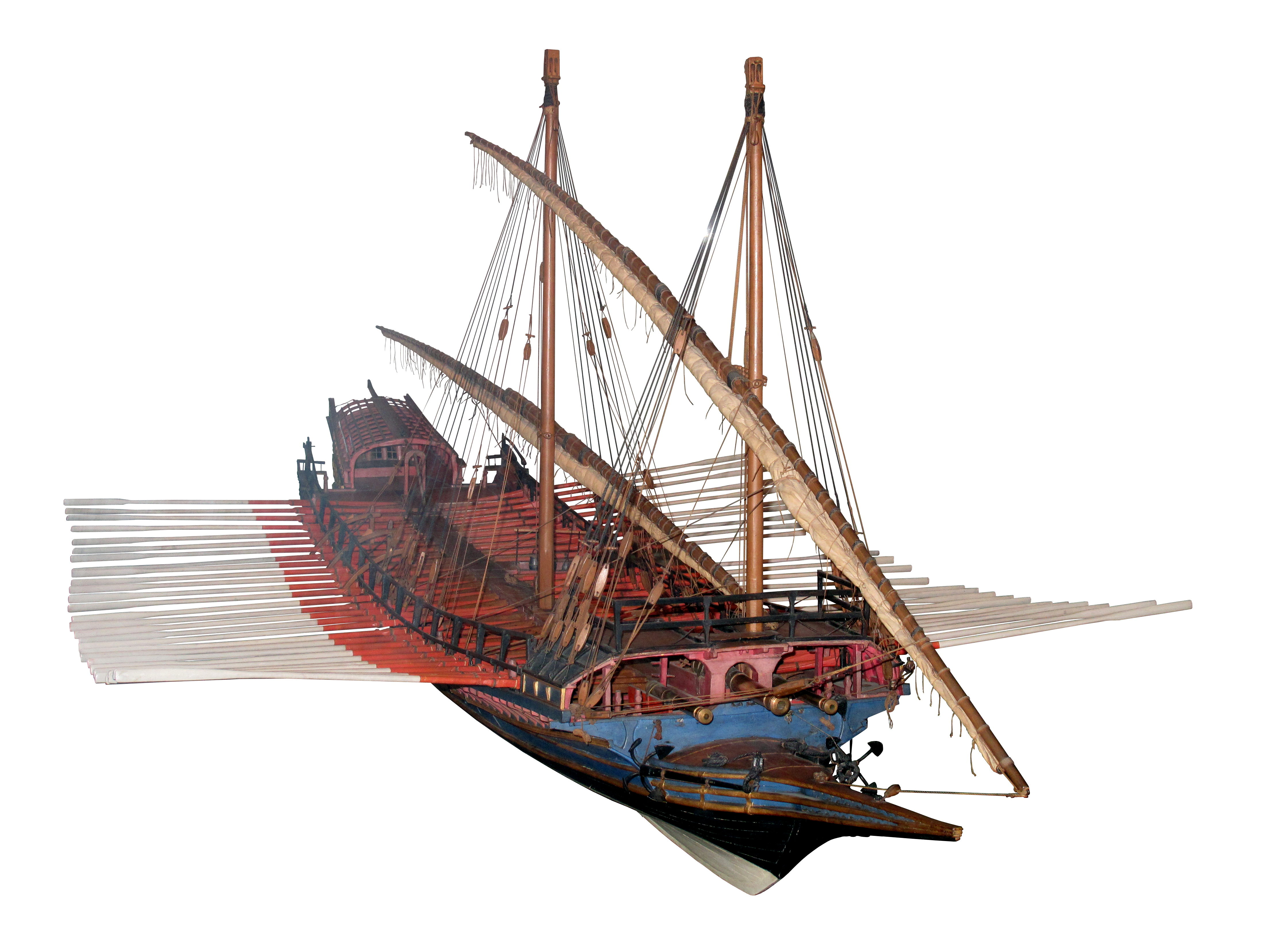
Model of a galley from the early modern period

Around the turn of the century, Piri Reis fought in the Ottoman–Venetian wars as a captain under his uncle's command. Like other Ottoman captains, he operated a galley, a shallow oar-driven warship well suited to the Mediterranean coasts.

During the 1499 Battle of Zonchio, Piri Reis piloted one of the 270 Ottoman ships that broke through the 150-ship Venetian fleet to enter the Gulf of Corinth, forcing the Venetian governor to surrender. After further victories under Kemal Reis at Modon and Navarino, the Ottoman Navy began to consolidate control over the Eastern Mediterranean. Piri Reis returned to the Western Mediterranean, raiding the coasts of Spain and nearby islands in 1501 alongside his uncle.

In a naval battle near Valencia, they captured a Spaniard who said he had sailed with Columbus and likely possessed one of the explorer's charts of the Americas. They also seized exotic New World materials, including parrot feathers and unusual black stones, possibly obsidian, that could cut metal. In 1502, Piri Reis and his uncle returned to Constantinople and resumed hostilities with Venice.

Piri Reis last saw his uncle in 1510. He was the captain of his own ship, but Kemal Reis remained his mentor, commanding officer, and patron. They returned from Tripoli in North Africa, where the locals had asked Kemal Reis to become their governor and protect them from Spain. On 25 July 1510, Spain seized Tripoli while the Ottomans were still traveling to Constantinople. In the capital, Sultan Bayezid II tasked Kemal Reis with delivering aid to Egypt against Portuguese incursions, though Piri Reis remained in Europe. Kemal Reis drowned at sea; his ship sank in a storm near the island of Samos. News of his death reached Cairo in February 1511, and a Venetian report claimed that Kemal Reis had been sabotaged when İskender Ağa—a rival who became admiral of the Ottoman Navy in 1511—sent Kemal to sea in "an unsound ship". The Kitab-ı Bahriye contains a eulogy for Kemal Reis:

Many men go off thinking they will return: those who do not are those who knew little about where they were going. Behold Kemal Reis: he left intending to return but failed and sank at sea. Though his fame was once spoken of by all, now even his name is lost and gone. This world is vanity; it is every man's lot to live and die. While in the service of Sultan Bayezid, the angel of death caught him upon the sea.

— Piri Reis, Kitab-ı Bahriye

After his uncle died, Piri Reis returned to Gelibolu to focus on his cartographic work. (Note: Many sources date Kemal Reis's death to 1510. Others give 1511 as the year he died. Piri Reis wrote: "He had served the sultan fully seventeen years and died in 917 [1511].") There, he completed the world map for which he is best known today. Dated to Muharram 919 AH in the Islamic calendar (March 1513 AD), the manuscript depicts the recently explored shores of the Americas and Africa. When Piri Reis resumed sailing along the North African coast, he did so under the corsair Hayreddin Barbarossa. Around 1515, to establish ties with the new sultan, Selim I, Hayreddin sent a captured ship laden with wood to Constantinople under Piri Reis's command—a delivery the sultan rewarded with two galleys and a robe of honor.

During the 1516–1517 Ottoman conquest of Egypt, Piri Reis commanded the ships blockading Alexandria, and after the empire's victory, he presented his 1513 world map to Sultan Selim I. How Selim used the map is unknown, as it vanished from history until its rediscovery centuries later.

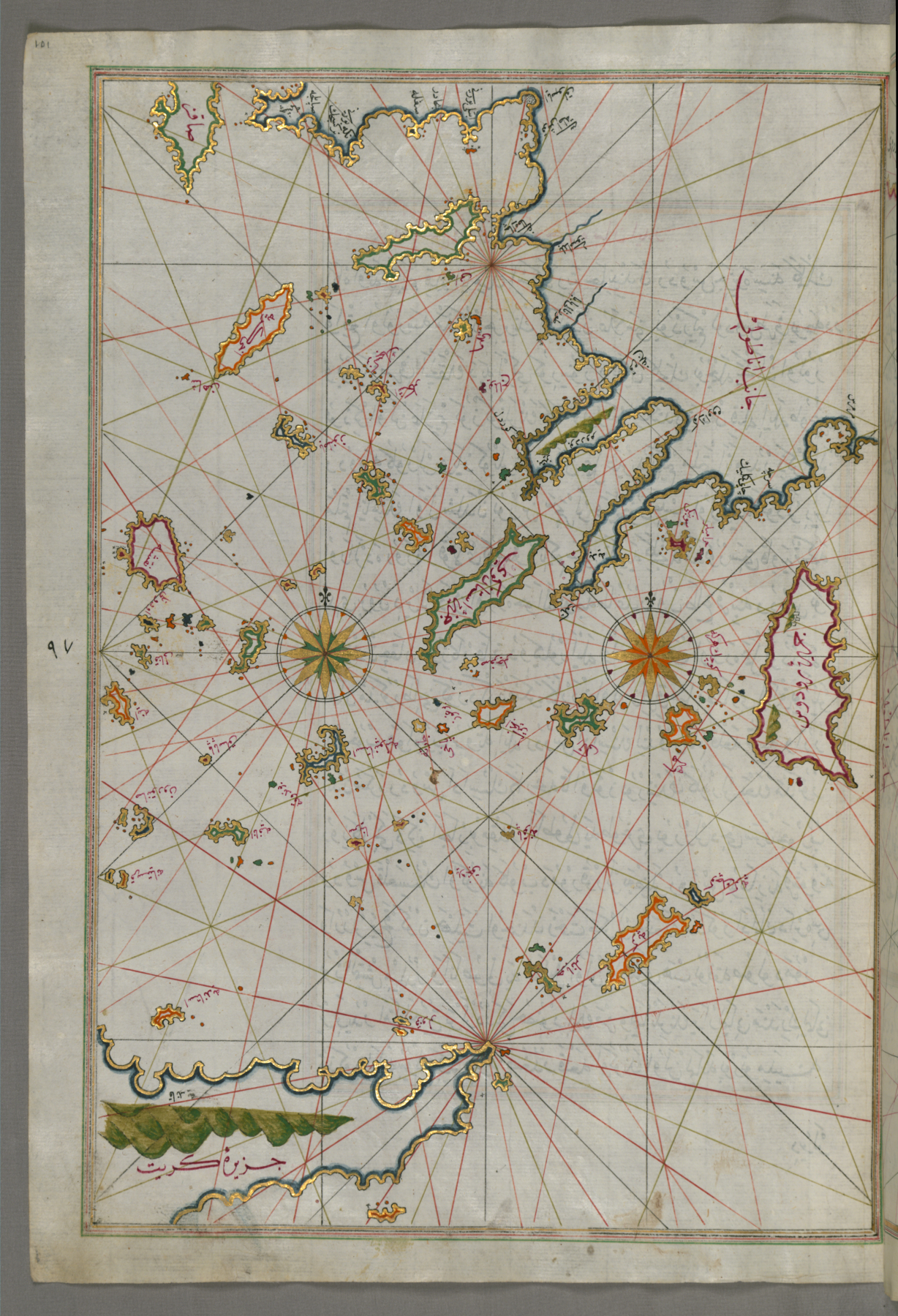
Rhodes (largest island outlined in red) south of Anatolia (outlined in dark blue)

His relationship with the Ottoman state frayed after the conquest of Egypt, when he was among several captains who left the Ottoman Navy. Contemporary historian Marino Sanuto the Younger wrote that they "rebelled against the sultan" and "were able to land 800 men"—including relatives of Kurtoğlu Muslihiddin Reis—on the island of Chios, where they captured a castle and "400 of the sultan's subjects" in February 1518. When Venetian ambassador Alvise Mocenigo returned from Constantinople, his ship's captain steered into a storm rather than risk capture by Piri Reis. The rebellion continued into May, when he was recorded raiding the island of Euboea and the coast near Athens. It was short-lived: Kurtoğlu was given command of an Ottoman fleet in 1518, and Piri Reis was back in Ottoman service before the conquest of Rhodes.

The reasons for his brief defection remain unknown. By 1522, Piri Reis rejoined the Ottoman Navy and took part in Sultan Suleiman the Magnificent's Siege of Rhodes, for which he had advocated. Controlled by the Knights of St. John, the island provided shelter to Christian pirates.

Suleiman became sultan in 1520, and craftsmen across the empire presented exemplars of their work in hopes of winning favor. By 1521, Piri Reis had offered the first version of the Kitab-ı Bahriye, a nautical atlas that included advice on conquering Rhodes. There is no evidence the gift received any response. A second version, completed after the conquest, only discussed the siege of Rhodes in terms of acquiring drinking water.

When putting down Hain Ahmed Pasha's 1524 rebellion in Egypt, the Ottoman grand vizier and sultan's childhood friend Pargalı Ibrahim Pasha rode aboard the navy's flagship, commanded by Piri Reis. The two pashas were unrelated; the title was the highest the sultan bestowed on Ottoman officials. The longer second version of the Kitab-ı Bahriye resulted from a conversation with the grand vizier, who asked about the maps and charts used aboard the ship. Ibrahim commissioned the expanded atlas, which Piri Reis presented to the sultan by 1526. Ibrahim Pasha was executed in 1536, and no surviving works of Piri Reis's cartography date past this point.

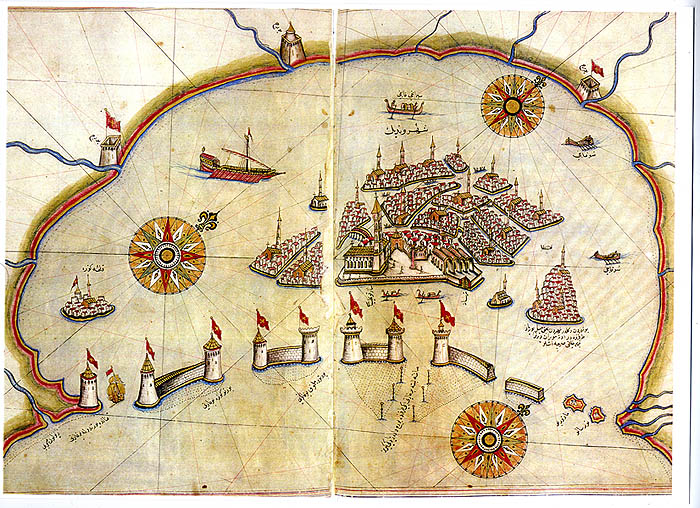
Venice as depicted in the Kitab-ı Bahriye

While Piri Reis disappeared from Ottoman records between his 1528 map and his 1547 appointment in Egypt, Venetian sources tracked his actions as a recurring threat to the Republic, which still held the islands of Cyprus and Crete. In 1532, he led an eight-vessel squadron against pirates in the Adriatic, the arm of the Mediterranean leading into the Gulf of Venice. After Charles V's admiral Andrea Doria conquered Ottoman-held Coron in the Peloponnese that same year, Piri Reis besieged its Spanish garrison with a larger squadron of ten galleys and five fustas (lighter, more maneuverable raiding vessels). As his squadron closed in to bombard the fortress, his own galley was struck by return fire before withdrawing. In 1536, before the outbreak of open war, Piri Reis seized the galley Contarina near Venetian Cyprus, and refused to return its cargo of precious stones on the grounds that the ship had been carrying Muslim prisoners.

When the Third Ottoman–Venetian War broke out in 1537, he pursued Venetian ships across the Eastern Mediterranean and served under Hayreddin at the siege of Corfu. In late 1546, six years after peace was restored between the empire and Venice, Piri Reis attacked the Venetian ship Liona, killing twelve sailors, wounding twelve more, and taking others captive. Venice's diplomat in Constantinople obtained an imperial order for their release, but Grand Vizier Rüstem Pasha sided with Piri Reis's counter-claim that the Venetians had been the aggressors.

After the death of Yahudi Sinan, who was organizing a raid against the Portuguese, Piri Reis was promoted to Hind Kapudan-ı Derya or grand admiral of the Ottoman fleet in the Indian Ocean. Some sources characterize this as a dual appointment that also made him admiral of the fleet in Egypt (Mısır Kapudan-ı Derya). Before departing, Piri Reis sold off his properties in Constantinople: his home, garden, and vineyard. He left with his family and all of his money, suggesting he did not plan to return. Piri Reis then took command of the empire's Indian Ocean fleet, based out of Suez, Egypt, a significant port in the Gulf of Suez at the northern tip of the Red Sea.

== Grand admiral of the Indian Ocean fleet ==
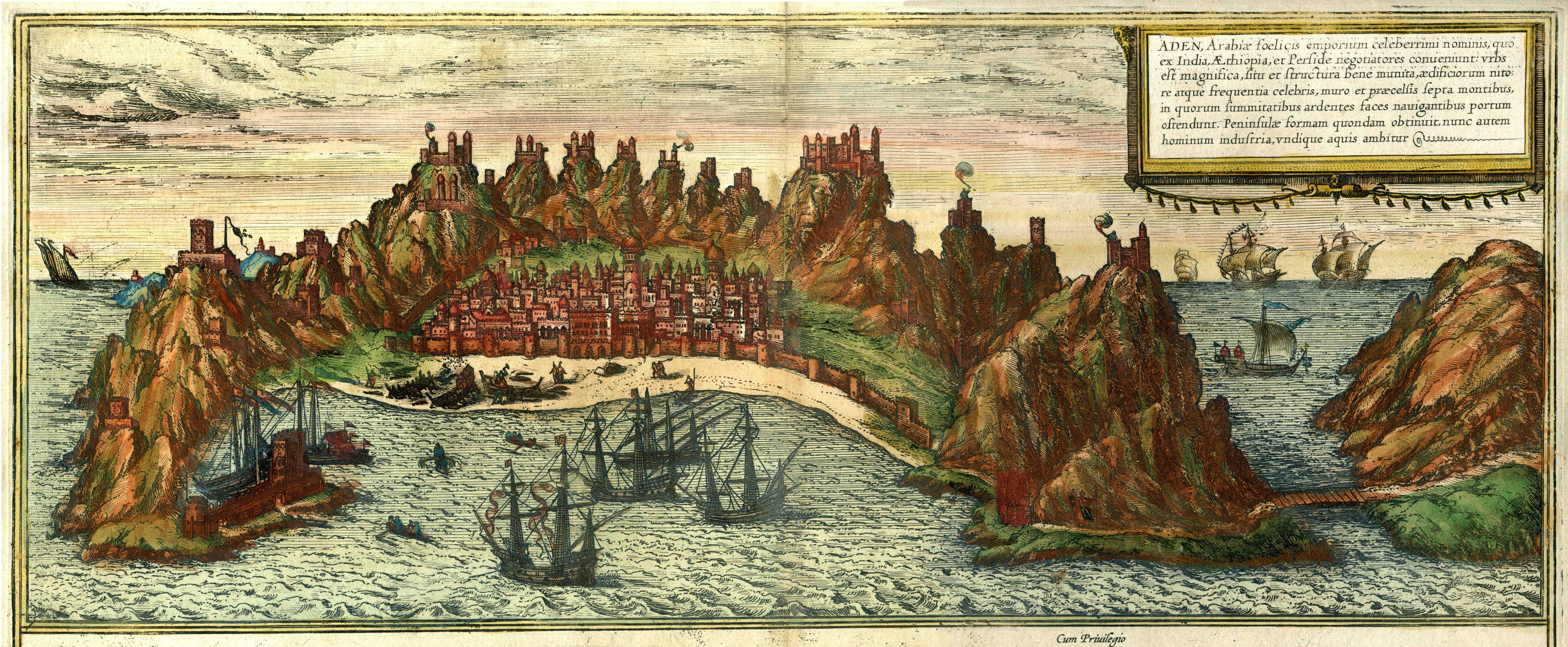
Aden as illustrated in the 16th-century Civitates Orbis Terrarum

When Piri Reis arrived in the Red Sea, the Portuguese Navy employed sailing ships capable of navigating the open ocean, while the Ottoman Navy relied mainly on galleys, which were more effective along coasts. This limited Ottoman naval warfare to the Red Sea, the Persian Gulf, and the narrow straits around Arabia. Cut off from the Mediterranean by the Isthmus of Suez, the Red Sea required a separate fleet and supply chain.

Shortly before Piri Reis's promotion to admiral in Egypt, the empire lost Aden, a port straddling the Red Sea and Indian Ocean. A disastrous Ottoman campaign to expand territory inland had caused a rebellion, and Aden's urban leaders had ceded their city to a local Arab chief who sought Portuguese protection. The most senior remaining Ottoman leader in Yemen, Özdemir Pasha, wrote to the governor of Egypt to seek his assistance. At that time, Piri Reis was leading a galley squadron from Alexandria and was the highest-ranking naval officer in the region.

On 29 October 1547, Piri Reis left Suez with a fleet of sixty ships. He landed reinforcements beyond the range of Aden's cannons, hauled artillery into the hills overlooking the city, and brought the fleet into Aden's crescent-shaped bay. The two Portuguese ships that arrived were not enough to stop the fleet or the land army that quickly overran the city. The citadel of Aden fell to Piri Reis on 26 February 1548. Reinforcements arrived too late. In January 1549, Portuguese ships found the Ottoman Navy already in the bay and attempted to flee, but Piri Reis's fleet pursued them, captured the sailors, and burned their ships.

Piri Reis's expedition against Hormuz (1552)

Following his success at Aden, Piri Reis was rewarded with a timar—a type of Ottoman land grant that came with annual tax revenue—worth 100,000 silver coins, and he received the assignment that would lead to his death. Sultan Suleiman instructed him to take Hormuz Island, which Portugal had controlled since 1515. Located at the mouth of the Persian Gulf, the island could control sea traffic. Taking Bahrain Island was a secondary objective. In April 1552, Piri Reis left Suez with twenty-five galleys, five sailing ships, and 850 soldiers. Well after the fleet had left Suez, Rüstem Pasha, who had previously offered Piri Reis protection during his dispute with Venice, was dismissed from his position as Grand Vizier. Historian Maria Pedani has suggested that losing this court ally may have weakened Piri Reis's political position as the Hormuz expedition faltered.

The Sultan's official plan had been for Piri Reis to slip past the Portuguese unnoticed and merge his Suez fleet with a recently formed Ottoman fleet in the Persian Gulf. However, a Portuguese galley captained by Simão da Costa spotted the five-galley advance squadron, led by Piri Reis's son Mehmed, and raced ahead to warn Hormuz. Piri Reis then decided to attack the Portuguese strongholds directly. In August, the Ottoman fleet took Muscat after a month-long siege. The Portuguese garrison was captured and forced to work the oars on galleys in the fleet.

The Ottomans pillaged the area, destroyed fortifications, and continued to Hormuz. The expedition cleared the Arabian Peninsula coast of Portuguese occupation, and Portuguese forces prepared for the coming attack on Hormuz by evacuating most of the island. Wealthy residents took refuge on the nearby island of Qeshm, and the Portuguese soldiers and the Hormuz royal family retreated to the fortress.

Piri Reis's forces entered the city of Hormuz in September 1552, but could not take the fortress. They besieged and bombarded it for several weeks. The Ottoman forces ran low on gunpowder during the siege and Piri Reis wrote to Basra for supplies, but the Ottoman governor there, Kubad Pasha, sent nothing. The 16th-century Portuguese historian Diogo do Couto wrote that Kubad Pasha was instructed to assemble a naval force large enough to deliver 15,000 men to Hormuz, but these reinforcements never arrived. Acting on the advice of the imprisoned Portuguese commander from Muscat, Piri Reis grew increasingly concerned about a possible Portuguese counterattack in October. On the ninth, he lifted the siege.

The Ottomans looted the city of Hormuz, plundered the nearby island of Qeshm, and retreated into the Gulf with over a million pieces of gold. A letter from the Portuguese governor inside the fortress, dated 31 October 1552, explained how close the siege had been: the walls were nearly collapsing when the Ottomans ran low on "munitions, gunpowder, and other war materials". The Portuguese governor of India, Afonso de Noronha, organized a fleet of forty ships led by his nephew that reached Hormuz a month after Piri Reis's departure.

The Ottoman fleet retreated into the Persian Gulf, bypassed its secondary target, Bahrain, and arrived at Basra by 1553. There, Kubad Pasha, who had failed to send supplies during the siege, refused to provide rowers for the galleys. Soucek suggested that hostility between the two men "may have been at the root" of Piri Reis's decision to return to Egypt quickly as well as the "accusatory report the pasha probably sent to Constantinople." (Note: Historians have offered various possible explanations for the animosity between Piri Reis and Kubad Pasha. Ertuğrul Önalp lists: Kubad Pasha's jealousy towards Piri Reis's growing influence, a misunderstanding on how difficult it would have been to take Hormuz from the Portuguese, Piri Reis looting from Muslims in Qeshm, Piri Reis not sailing directly to Basra, and Kubad Pasha expecting some amount of the looted gold.) Leaving most of the fleet behind, Piri Reis returned with only two ships in 1553.

Ottoman histories faulted him for plundering Qeshm, and the gold he brought back to Egypt played a role in his death sentence. Although allegations of outright bribery were unjustified, they may have been believed at the time of his execution. Contemporary Ottoman historian İbrahim Peçevi wrote that "although the bribe charge was implausible – the [sultan] deigned to believe it and issued an order of execution." Venetian diplomats in Constantinople sent a letter dated 15 November 1553 stating that Piri Reis had been "charged with having raised the siege of the fortress of Hormuz because of bribery" and replaced. The sultan had him beheaded in Cairo in late 1553. (Note: Older histories dated the execution to 1554, but İdris Bostan has identified the most likely date as 16 December 1553.) When a delegation from Hormuz traveled to Constantinople to demand compensation for the looted gold shortly after Piri Reis's death, they were dismissed for lack of proof. According to Soucek, this "suggests that no effort had been made to probe" the allegations against Piri Reis before his execution. Soon after the execution, Seydi Ali Reis attempted to bring Piri Reis's Basra fleet back to Suez, but the Portuguese intercepted them, and the ships were captured, destroyed, or lost at sea.

== Works ==
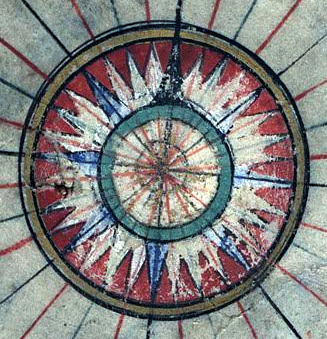
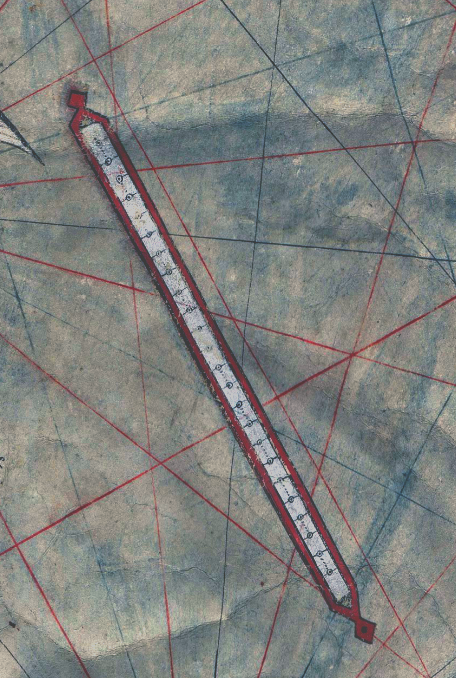
Portolan symbols on the 1513 map include: compass roses for direction (top), crosses for rocks and reefs (left), dots for shallows and sandbanks (center), and scale bars for distance (right).

All of Piri Reis's surviving maps are portolan charts, nautical maps designed for navigation by dead reckoning, a method by which a ship's location is estimated from its direction, speed, and elapsed time. They employ a windrose network—a web of lines radiating from compass roses along degrees of bearing—rather than a projected longitude and latitude grid. Piri Reis's maps employed standard portolan symbols to indicate hazards.

Piri Reis's works were unusual in 16th-century Turkish and broader Islamic cartography for their deep engagement with the European Age of Discovery. Three of his works have survived in some form: fragments of his 1513 and 1528 world maps, held in the Topkapı Palace Museum in Istanbul, along with copies of the Kitab-ı Bahriye in libraries and museums around the world, though his original manuscripts are lost. The second edition of the Kitab-ı Bahriye incorporated information from new Portuguese and Spanish voyages, including Vasco da Gama's discovery of a sea route to India, and the 1528 world map cited new Portuguese voyages to Labrador and Newfoundland.

According to historian Giancarlo Casale, the 1513 world map and especially the Kitab-ı Bahriye preface rhetorically undermine the significance of European discoveries by reframing them as the rediscovery of ancient knowledge. For instance, Piri Reis invokes Alexander the Great when explaining contemporary European discoveries. In the Quran, "Dhu al-Qarnayn"—identified with Alexander the Great in the Turkish literary tradition—traveled to every corner of the world, thereby defining its limits. Marginal inscriptions on the world map mention "charts drawn in the days of Alexander" and a book that "fell into the hands" of Columbus, describing lands "at the end of the Western Sea." In the 1526 version of the Kitab-ı Bahriye, Piri Reis explicitly attributes European discoveries to lost works created during Alexander's legendary voyages:

My friend, the Franks both read and write everything there is to know about the science of the sea. But do not suppose that they invented such knowledge on their own; and if you wish, I will explain why. During his time, the famous ruler Alexander traveled over all the seas, and whatever he saw and whatever he heard he had recorded, item by item, by a competent person.

— Piri Reis, Kitab-ı Bahriye (1526)

=== 1513 world map ===
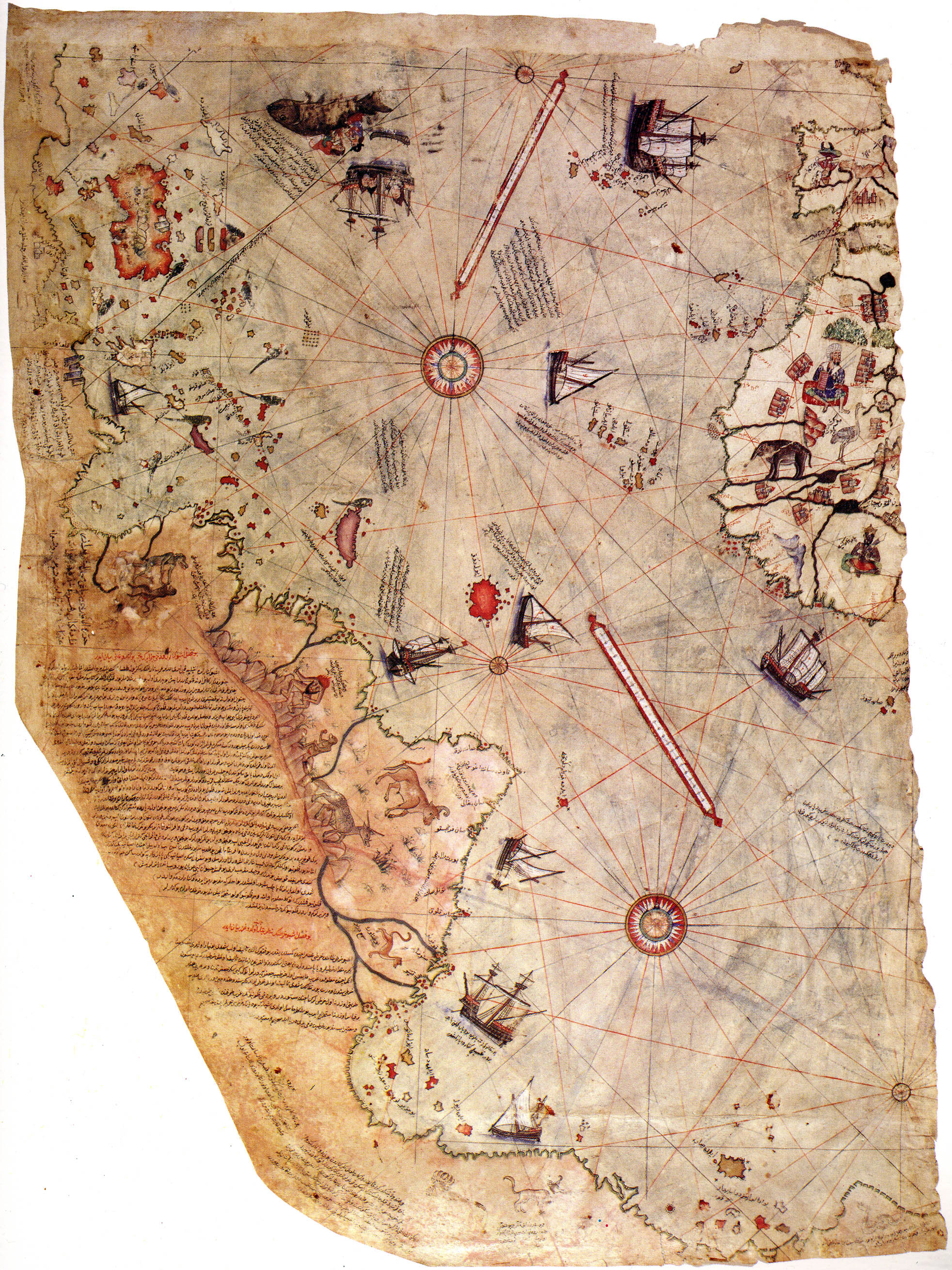
Surviving fragment of the first world map of Piri Reis (1513)

The 1513 Piri Reis map is a world map drawn on gazelle skin, shaped by the natural curve of the animal's shoulder. Roughly one-third of the map survives, housed in the Topkapı Palace in Istanbul. The map's coastlines are synthesized from a range of contemporary and classical sources.

When rediscovered in 1929, the map drew international attention for including a partial copy of a map by Christopher Columbus, one otherwise lost to history. (Note: There is disagreement on how much of the map draws from Columbus. Paul Kahle and most later scholars attributed everything north and west of the phantom island Antilia to this source. Soucek expressed doubts about Kahle's "supposed connection", and commented that "as for the 'map made by Columbus', Piri Reis' own map shows that he must also have used other sources depicting South America (specifically, the eastern bulge of the continent, thus Brazil), which Columbus could not have known" about when the map would have been produced. McIntosh found that Cuba, Central America, and Hispaniola could be clearly attributed to an early map from Columbus, but not necessarily the Lesser Antilles. McIntosh noted that the duplication of some features like the Virgin Islands indicated an attempt to join a second map in that area.) Though Columbus created at least eight known charts of his discoveries, no originals survive. Piri Reis's 1513 map contains extensive notes in Ottoman Turkish, the longest of which credits part of the Americas to one of these now-lost maps, which the inscription cites to the Spaniard captured near Valencia in 1501.

The unusual placenames and cartographic misconceptions suggest that Piri Reis drew from a map made on one of Columbus's early voyages to the Americas. For example, on the mainland in the northwest, a stretch of coast is labeled Ornofay, a term recorded by Columbus but not found on other maps. (Note: Akçura transliterates the name as Kawpunta Arofi, and McIntosh as Kaw Punta Orofay, with two plausible translations: "Cape Point Ornofay" or "Cuba, Point Ornofay".) The northwestern coastline combines features of Central America and Cuba into a single body of land. South of Ornofay, Puerto Grande (the name Columbus assigned to Guantanamo Bay, Cuba, on his second voyage) is found on no other surviving maps. Further south is Veragua, an early name for Panama.

Comparison of Piri Reis's Caribbean (left) to Martin Behaim's Asia (right)

Scholars attribute this peculiar arrangement of the Caribbean to Columbus's erroneous claim that he had found a new route to Asia. During the 1494 expedition, he was so adamant about this that he had his men sign formal documents declaring Cuba to be an Asian peninsula, under penalty of cutting out their tongues. (Note: Cathay was a historical name for China, and Marco Polo described Mangi as directly south of Cathay. Columbus identified the native placename, Mago, for a region on the southern side of Cuba as Marco Polo's Mangi. He wrote of Cuba, "I thought it must be the mainland, the province of Cathay... At length, after the proceeding of many leagues, and finding that nothing new presented itself, and that the coast was leading me northwards".) As an example of this, the caption near islands at the north edge of the map states, "It is in Asia." However, the largest island, oriented vertically, is labeled "The Island of Hispaniola" and merges early knowledge of Hispaniola with Marco Polo's description of Japan. Historian Joaquim Gaspar has suggested that Columbus's creation of a map with Hispaniola rotated to match Japan was an attempt to motivate his own men with the unattainable promise of wealth upon reaching India, noting the difficulty in navigating by compass from a map with contradictory norths. Alternatively, McIntosh suggests that Columbus composed two maps: an unofficial map for navigation and an official map presented as evidence of his continued claims of having reached the Far East. The map's depiction of the Caribbean is primitive, even compared to the Juan de la Cosa map, produced around 1500. It preserves potentially the earliest surviving cartographic record of the New World discoveries.

By contrast, the depiction of South America, cited to recent Portuguese voyages, is detailed and accurate for its time. The southernmost conclusively identified feature on the map is a stretch of recently explored Brazilian coastline, which includes Cabo Frio (Kav Friyo on the map), possibly the earliest depiction of Rio de Janeiro, and what is likely the area around Cananéia, labeled Katino on the map. Beyond this point, the coast curves sharply east. There are two competing and overlapping explanations for the map's southern coast. Most scholars interpret this southern coast as a version of Terra Australis, a southern landmass once hypothesized to balance the known land in the Northern Hemisphere. It may also depict the coast of South America bent to fit the natural curve of the skin the map was drawn on. However, there is no textual evidence that the map represents land south of present-day Cananéia.

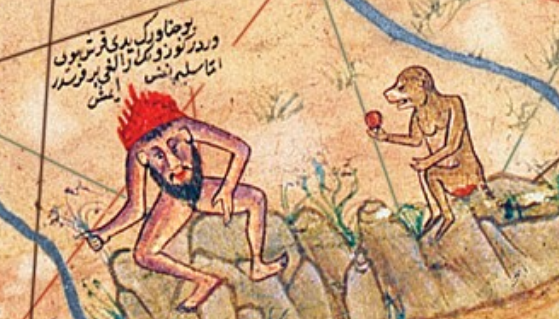
A headless Blemmye and a monkey on the western edge of the map

The map is visually distinct from European portolan charts and shows influences from the tradition of Islamic miniature painting. Piri Reis adapted Classical and Islamic iconography to the portolan charting of newly discovered coasts. Historian Karen Pinto argues that the legendary creatures on the map signal a new conception of the Atlantic as another navigable sea. In medieval Islamic cartography, an impassable "Encircling Ocean" surrounded the Old World, its edges populated by terrifying monsters from Classical antiquity. Piri Reis transposes these creatures across the Atlantic and characterizes them as friendly. The Blemmyes, headless cannibals typically drawn menacing the fringes of medieval mappa mundi, appear as "harmless souls" atop the mountains in South America. Because it synthesizes diverse and contradictory sources, the map remains a valuable but enigmatic record of lost primary data. In contrast, his later Kitab-ı Bahriye was characterized by Piri Reis's firsthand experience sailing the Mediterranean as a corsair and naval captain.

=== Kitab-ı Bahriye ===
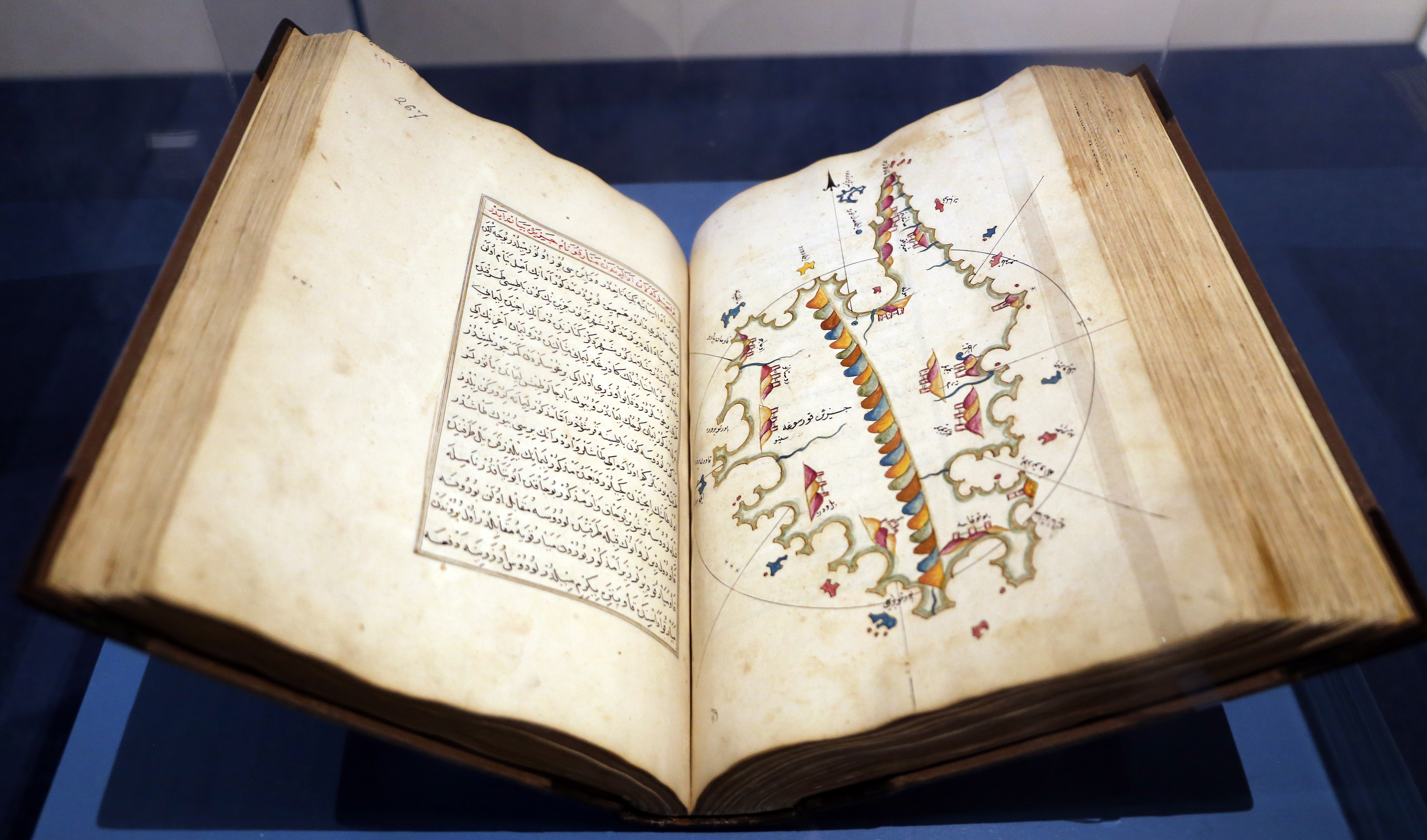
A copy of the Kitab-ı Bahriye open to the page on Corsica

The Kitab-ı Bahriye (Ottoman Turkish: كتاب بحرية), or Book of the Sea, is the most detailed portolan atlas of the Mediterranean. It combines information from a range of sources, including Piri Reis's own experiences. Along the coast of North Africa, the section on Tunisia draws heavily on his personal observations. For example, the description of the Galite Islands just off the Tunisian coast notes the dangers posed by southern winds; the availability of wild goats; and the quality of the fresh water, which Piri Reis compares in flavor to rose water. In the preface and epilogue, Piri Reis stated two goals: to create a practical manual for other sailors and to earn recognition for himself. The epilogue admits the book is not free from errors and encourages readers to correct them.

The main part of both versions is a guide to the Mediterranean Sea. Separate chapters cover specific locations with corresponding charts. Piri Reis said that he composed an atlas because any single map would have had limited space for written details, whereas some "knowledge cannot be known from maps; it must be explained." There are 130 chapters in the first version and 210 in the second. The chapters start at the Dardanelles, the narrow strait separating Asia from Europe near Gelibolu, where his cartographic work began; they progress counterclockwise around the Mediterranean. Each map has a compass rose indicating North for that page. Scale is indicated only in the textual descriptions, not with scale bars. Written when Ottoman sailors relied on oar-driven galleys, the Kitab-ı Bahriye reflects their needs and capabilities, providing information on coastal waters, safe harbors, hazards, and fresh water.

There are two versions of the book, both dedicated to Sultan Suleiman the Magnificent. The first version was composed between 1511 and 1521. (Note: Soucek (1992) notes that work on the book began in 1511 around the same time as work on his 1513 world map. Soucek (2013) gives 1520 as the completion date, while Soucek (1992) gives 927 AH (1521). Hepworth (2005) says the book was "presented" in 1521. Lepore, Piccardi, and Rombai (2013) say the book "appeared" in 1521.) The second, expanded version was commissioned by the grand vizier and presented to the sultan in 1526. It begins with a longer introduction written in verse, offering information on storms, winds, navigation with a compass and by the stars, reading nautical charts, and the oceans. It provides the first detailed Ottoman description of the Indian Ocean, and gives special attention to Hormuz Island at the strait leading into the Persian Gulf, where Piri Reis's naval career ended.

The book achieved fame only after his death. All known surviving manuscripts were copied no earlier than the latter half of the 16th century. The total number of copies produced may have reached into the hundreds, with more than 40 surviving examples containing over 5,700 maps among them. More hand-drawn manuscript maps survive of Piri Reis's work than of any other cartographer. At least some portion of the book has been translated into English, modern Turkish, Greek, French, German, and Italian.

=== 1528 world map ===
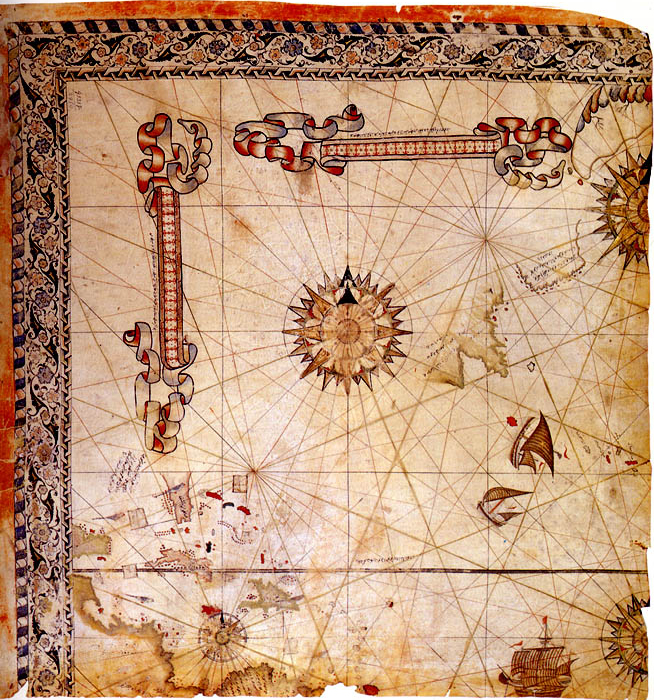
Surviving fragment of the second world map of Piri Reis (1528)

Piri Reis compiled a more accurate second world map in 1528, of which only the northwestern corner survives. (Note: The map gives its own date as the year 935 AH, spanning 1528–1529 AD. McIntosh suggests it may have been completed in 1529, though it is commonly called the map of 1528.) As with his 1513 map, it has calligraphic inscriptions in Ottoman Turkish. Both maps have a single inscription in Arabic: a colophon recording details of the manuscripts' production, likely handwritten by Piri Reis himself. The colophon records that the second map was also compiled in Gelibolu. Producing the map was a collaborative effort, involving parchment preparation, ink mixing, calligraphy, and illumination alongside the cartography itself. A comparable map could take up to ten months to complete.

Like his earlier work, the 1528 map is a portolan chart. Although such charts were typically made for use aboard ships, the map's elaborate details indicate that it was created for a wealthy patron. It has a single line of latitude, the Tropic of Cancer, drawn as a thick band slightly south of its true position, running behind Cuba, south of the Yucatán Peninsula, and into the map's ornate border.

The 1528 map is more accurate than Piri Reis's earlier world map and reflects new discoveries in the Americas. Its depiction of the newly explored regions of Greenland, Newfoundland, and Florida suggests that the cartography relied on Spanish maps from the 1520s, possibly through Italian copies. Hispaniola is correctly oriented relative to Cuba, while Cuba, labeled "Izle di Vana", is accurately depicted as an island in the Caribbean. An inscription notes that a traveler crossed Central America to reach the sea, likely an early cartographic reference to Vasco Núñez de Balboa, who traversed the Isthmus of Panama in 1513.

Unlike on the 1513 map, unexplored regions are left blank, marking a clear shift away from speculative cartography. An inscription in the blank space behind the Atlantic coast of Newfoundland concludes with the explanation, "Only the places known are sketched." Likewise, only the explored southern coastline of Florida is shown, while the remainder is left ambiguous, potentially representing either an island or a peninsula. The Padrón Real, the Spanish Empire's master chart continuously updated with information from new voyages, included this same ambiguity until 1520, and it influenced Italian cartography. These changes demonstrate that Piri Reis was actively following European voyages of discovery.

== Legacy ==
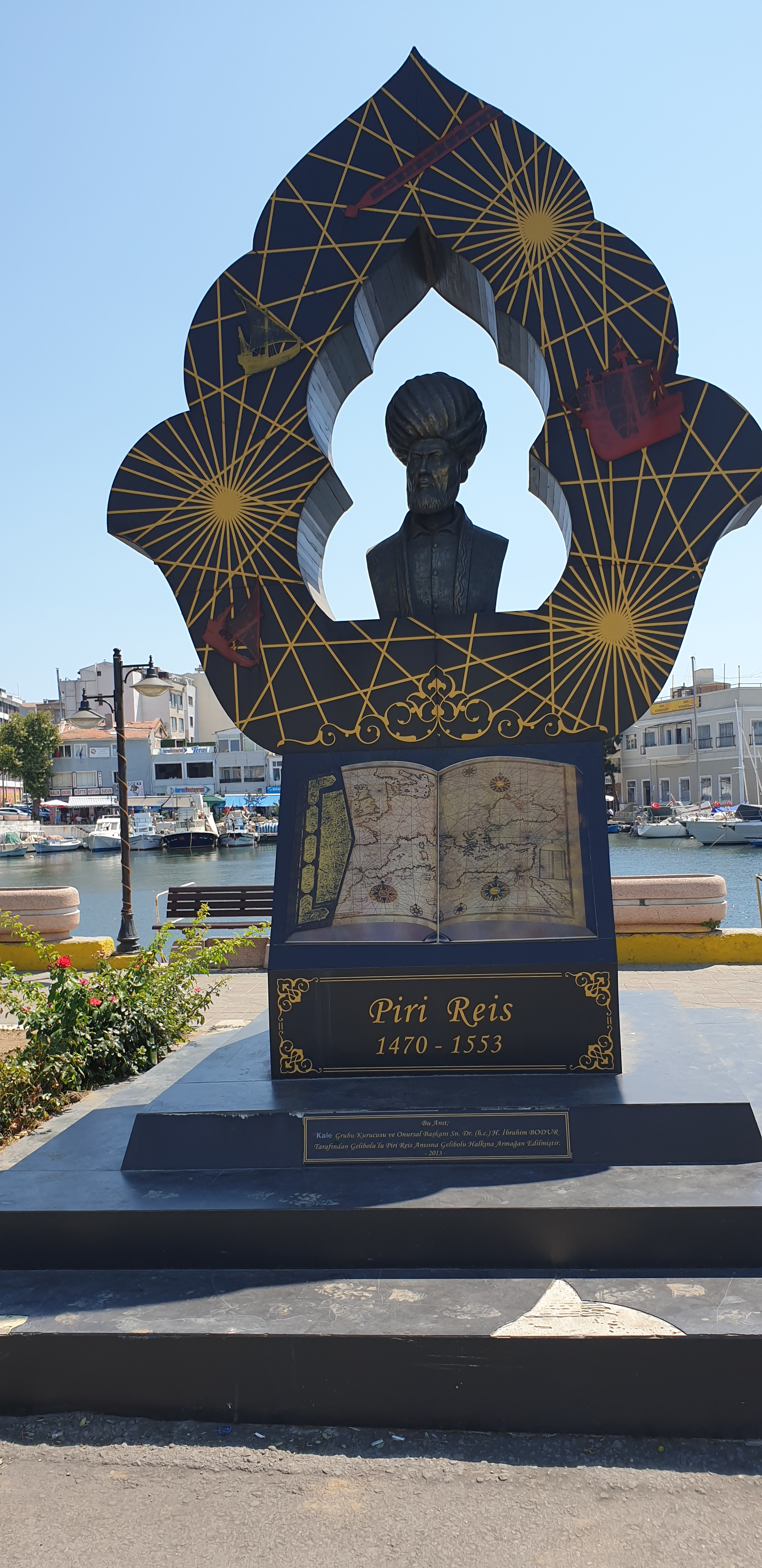
Bust of Piri Reis in Gelibolu

Piri Reis's cartography received limited appreciation during his lifetime. Soucek said that his works "show that although the Ottoman Empire had the potential to participate in the discoveries, its ruling elite spurned the attempt to blaze a trail in this direction." For example, Ottoman historian Cengiz Orhonlu, examining 16th-century Turkish authors who wrote about Piri Reis's execution, found that they criticized his performance during the Siege of Hormuz but did not discuss his maps or writing. Among his contemporaries, Piri Reis was not highly regarded as a seafarer: his reputation was overshadowed by his uncle's, and both were surpassed by later sailors such as the Barbarossa brothers, Hayreddin and Aruj.

There is no evidence that either version of his atlas circulated outside the royal palace prior to 1550. Copies produced after Piri Reis's death were often created for their aesthetic value rather than practical navigation. No Turkish school of cartography or navigation emerged to build on his work. Murat Reis the Elder's expedition to the Canary Islands and the 1586 Sack of Lanzarote were among the few times when Piri Reis's Atlantic cartography was likely used by the Ottoman Navy. The empire's navy—even during the Canary Islands expedition—remained largely composed of oar-driven galleys past the point when other naval powers were moving to sailing ships better suited to the open oceans. Ottoman scholar Kâtip Çelebi built on the Kitab-ı Bahriye in his 17th-century work, Müntehab-ı Bahriyye. Çelebi added new charts of his own, and he updated the atlas's maps and prose, drawing on Western sources. By the 18th century, major works of cartography from Western Europe were being translated into Turkish.

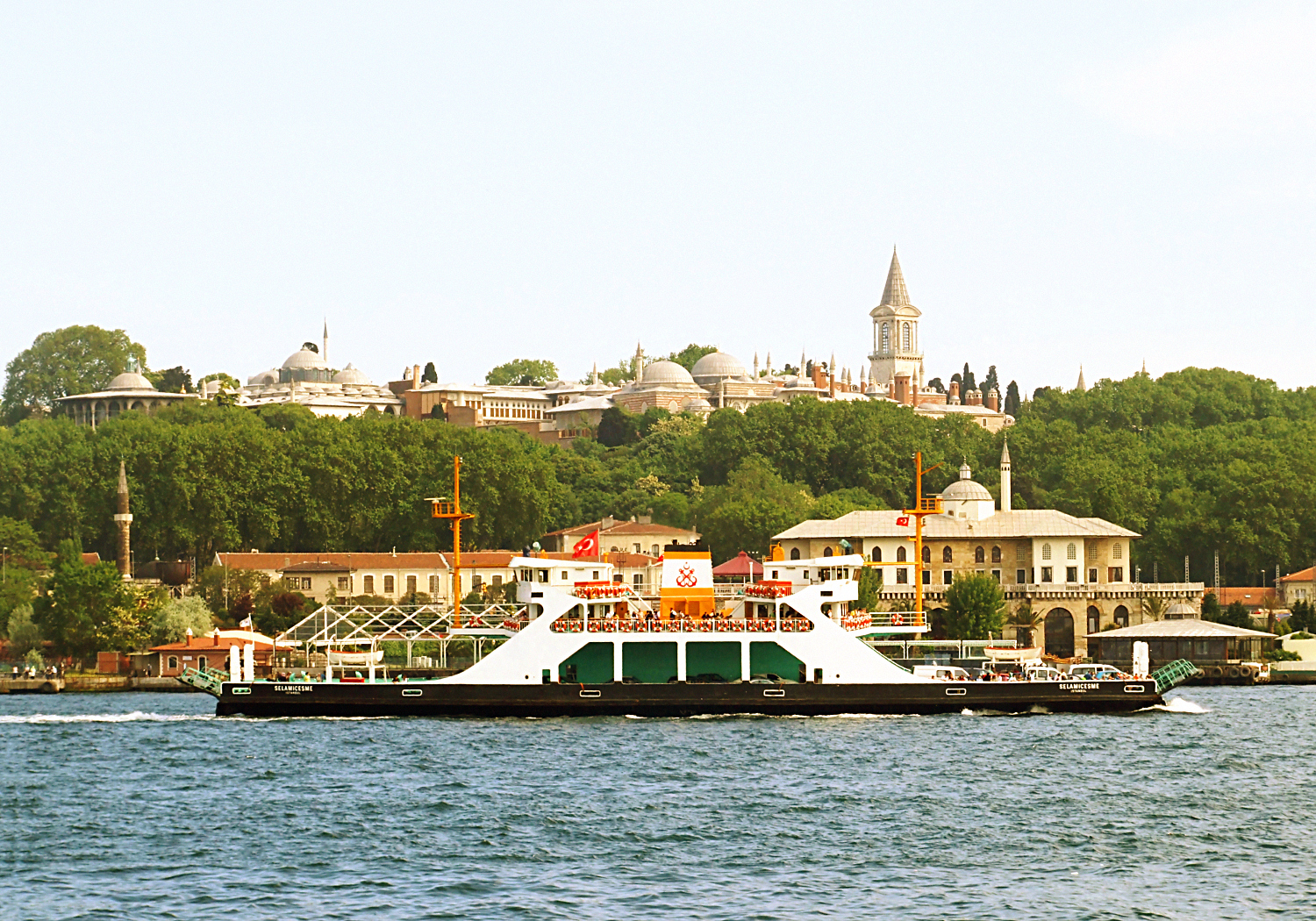
The Topkapı Palace where the 1513 world map was discovered

When Piri Reis's world map was unearthed in 1929, it received international media attention. After the Ottoman Empire was defeated in the First World War, the Republic of Turkey was founded within its diminished borders just six years before the discovery. Seeing the map as evidence of the Turkish people's potential to build a modern nation, the republic's first president Mustafa Kemal Atatürk took a personal interest in it and initiated projects to publish facsimiles and conduct further research. Discovered during Atatürk's reforms to modernize Turkey, it became a point of national pride, and its rediscovery sparked interest in the Kitab-ı Bahriye. A facsimile of the book's second version was published by the Turkish Historical Society in 1935, and a four-volume photographic facsimile followed in 1988.

In the 21st century, Piri Reis is remembered as a cartographer more than a corsair or an admiral. Christine Isom-Verhaaren argues that the Kitab-ı Bahriye offers, within its navigational details, a snapshot of the Mediterranean world at a point of major geopolitical transformations. Piri Reis recorded firsthand the fall of Muslim power in Iberia, the rise of Habsburg power in Europe, the discovery of the Americas, and the Ottoman conquest of the Eastern Mediterranean. His world maps show how close he came to drawing the Ottomans into the Age of Discovery by synthesizing Portuguese, Spanish, Arab, and Classical sources, though his cartographic ambitions were twice rejected by sultans who took the empire down a different path. Beyond scholarly recognition, ships and submarines have been named after him, including the RV K. Piri Reis and TCG Pirireis. His name was also given to the Piri Reis University for maritime studies, founded in 2008. Historian Karen Pinto has commented that popular interest in his cartography has contributed to Piri Reis becoming "more famous than the Sultan who" executed him.

== Popular fiction and speculation ==
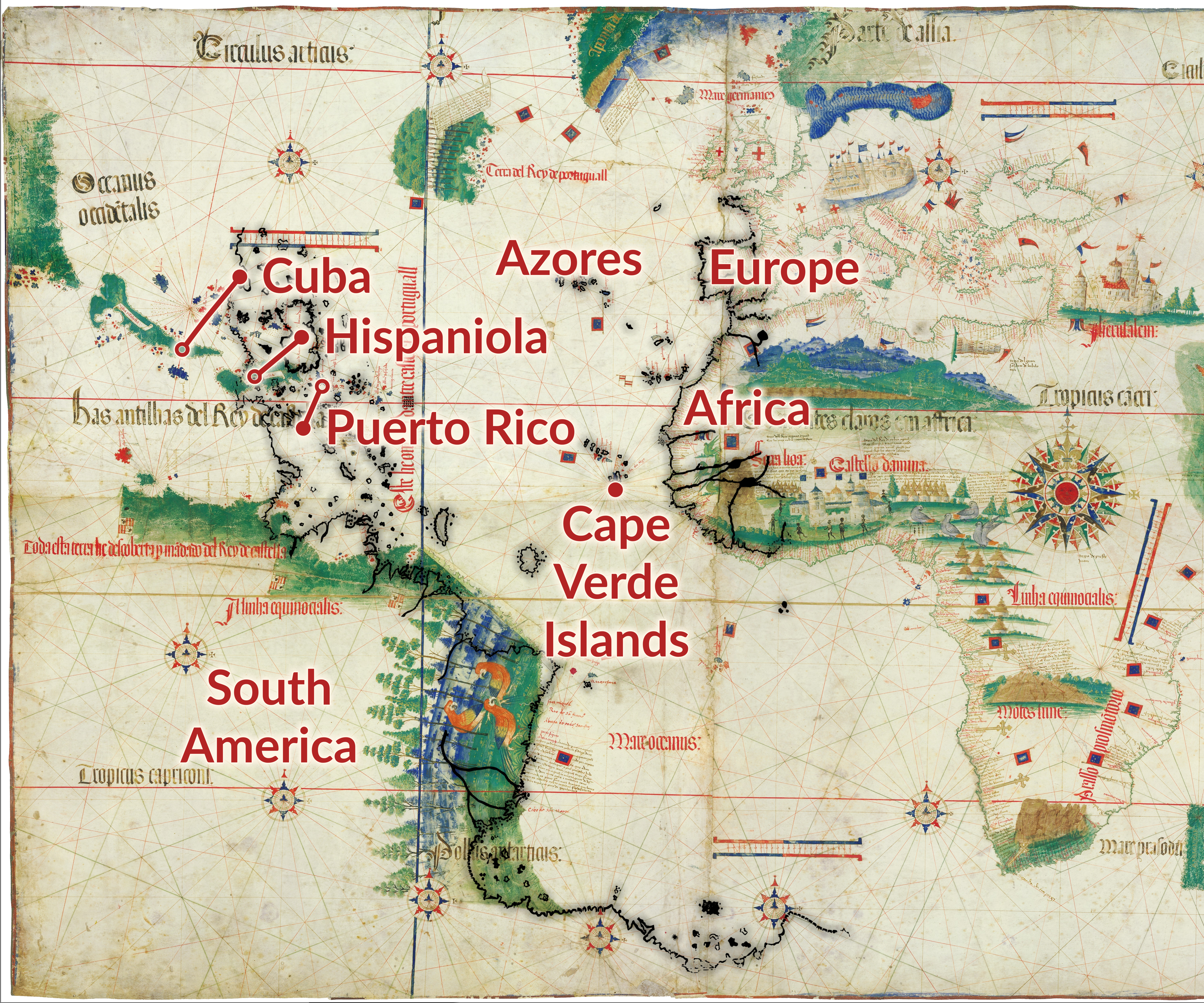
An outline of the 1513 map (black) laid over the 1502 Cantino planisphere shows the map's accuracy is comparable to other 16th-century cartography rather than anomalous.

Piri Reis's 1513 world map has inspired pseudoscientific claims and appeared in popular culture as an unsolved mystery. For example, civil engineer Arlington Mallery, history professor Charles Hapgood, and Hapgood's students developed the hypothesis that the 1513 world map exceeded 16th-century map-making abilities and contained a cartographic depiction of an ice-free Antarctic coast. In Hapgood's 1966 book Maps of the Ancient Sea Kings, he claims that islands along the map's southern Atlantic shore depict what are now ice-covered mountains in Antarctica's Queen Maud Land region.

Hapgood's book received skepticism for its lack of evidence and its reliance on cataclysmic pole shift, the disproven geological hypothesis that Earth's entire crust could slip around the planet. According to geologist Paul Heinrich, the book did not account for post-glacial rebound, the process by which land rises after glacial ice melts away. Heinrich further noted that the 1949 survey initially cited by Mallery could not measure even one percent of the area drawn in the Piri Reis map. Subsequent studies have shown no significant similarities between the map's southern coastline and Antarctica's subglacial coast. A 2024 study indicates that the Antarctic ice sheet began forming about 34 million years ago and covered the continent millions of years before the emergence of modern humans. Although the 1513 world map has been described by some authors as anomalous in its accuracy, it is no more precise than other 16th-century manuscript maps.

Hapgood's claims have nevertheless been uncritically repeated by Erich von Däniken in support of ancient astronauts and by Graham Hancock in support of an advanced lost civilization. The map and the pole shift hypothesis were key plot elements in Allan W. Eckert's science fiction novel The HAB Theory. Video game writer Corey May cites pseudohistory as an influence on his work for Ubisoft's Assassin's Creed series. He said that Immanuel Velikovsky's Worlds in Collision appealed to him for its "idea of unraveling historical mysteries" regardless of whether he believed it. Assassin's Creed: Project Legacy introduces the 1513 Piri Reis map as an artifact derived from a lost civilization, and Piri Reis himself appears as a character in Assassin's Creed Revelations. The franchise's conception of Piri Reis as recording information from a prehistoric map of the planet draws on Hancock and similar authors.

== Bibliography ==
- Adıvar, Abdülhak Adnan (1939). La Science Chez les Turcs Ottomans (in French). Paris: G.P. Maisonneuve et Larose. OCLC 11676376.
- Ágoston, Gábor; Masters, Bruce Alan, eds. (2009). Encyclopedia of the Ottoman Empire. New York: Infobase Publishing. ISBN 978-0-8160-6259-1.
- Ágoston, Gábor (2023). The Last Muslim Conquest: The Ottoman Empire and Its Wars in Europe. Princeton: Princeton University Press. ISBN 978-0-691-20539-7.
- Akçura, Yusuf (1935). "Piri Reis' Map". Piri Reis Haritasi (PDF). Istanbul: Türk Tarih Kurumu. OCLC 42754605.
- Anatolia News Agency (23 January 2013). "Topkapı Palace Museum Features Piri Reis Collection". Hürriyet Daily News. ISSN 1304-6640.
- Arslan, Nuşin (2016). Da und fort: die Zentralperspektive: türkische Malerei konnte Monarchien auslöschen - und türkische Malerinnen?: ein Schauspiel der Welt (in German). Berlin: Logos Verlag Berlin. ISBN 978-3-8325-4181-1.
- Ayyubi, N. Akmal (1989). "Contribution of Piri Reis to Cartography". Proceedings of the Indian History Congress. 50: 737–740. JSTOR 44146128.
- "Başbakan Gençlerden Beklentisini Açıkladı". Hürriyet Daily News (in Turkish). 2 October 2010. ISSN 1304-6640.
- Casale, Giancarlo (28 January 2010). The Ottoman Age of Exploration. Oxford: Oxford University Press. ISBN 978-0-19-537782-8.
- Casale, Giancarlo (2019). "Did Alexander the Great Discover America? Debating Space and Time in Renaissance Istanbul". Renaissance Quarterly. 72 (3): 863–909. doi:10.1017/rqx.2019.252.
- Davies, Gordon L. Herries (1985). "Reviewed Work(s): Maps of the Ancient Sea Kings. Evidence of Advanced Civilization in the Ice Age by Charles H. Hapgood". Imago Mundi. 37: 108–109. JSTOR 1150840.
- Dierksmeier, Laura; Cespa, Stefano (22 April 2022). "The Balearic Islands in 'Island Encyclopaedias', 700 BCE–1700 CE: An Historical and Archaeological Assessment of Island Knowledge Production with Suggestions for Future Research". Shima. 16 (1): 339–377. doi:10.21463/shima.149.
- Drewry, David J., ed. (1983). Antarctica: Glaciological and Geophysical Folio. Cambridge: Scott Polar Research Institute. ISBN 978-0-901021-04-5.
- Esposito, John L., ed. (2009). The Oxford Encyclopedia of the Islamic world. New York: Oxford University Press. ISBN 978-0-19-530513-5.
- Earle, Peter (1970). Corsairs of Malta and Barbary. London: Sidgwick and Jackson. ISBN 978-0-283-98093-0.
- "Experts Investigate Fish Deaths, Pollution Crisis in Izmir Bay". Türkiye Today. 31 August 2024. ISSN 1305-0400.
- Fagan, Garrett G. (2006). Archaeological Fantasies: How Pseudoarchaeology Misrepresents the Past and Misleads the Public. Abingdon: Routledge. ISBN 978-0-415-30592-1.
- Floor, Willem M. (2006). The Persian Gulf: A Political and Economic History of Five Port Cities, 1500-1730. Washington, DC: Mage Publishers. ISBN 978-1-933823-12-6.
- Gaspar, Joaquim Alves (2015). "The Representation of the West Indies in Early Iberian Cartography: A Cartometric Approach". Terrae Incognitae. 47 (1): 10–32. doi:10.1179/0082288415Z.00000000041. S2CID 128885931.
- Gerber, Albrecht (2010). Deissmann the Philologist. Berlin: De Gruyter. ISBN 978-3-11-022432-0.
- Gitman, Esther (20 May 2024). A Legacy of the Jews of Yugoslavia with a Focus on Sarajevo. Cambridge and New York: Cambridge Scholars Publishing. ISBN 978-1-0364-0500-7.
- Goodrich, Thomas D. (27–29 September 2004). "Oturum 6: Piri Reis'in Bahriye Adlı Kitabının Tartışılması Genel Değerlendirme ve Kapanış". Piri Reis'in Kitab-ı Bahriye İsimli Eserindeki 5658 Harita [The 5658 Maps of the Kitab-i Bahriye of Piri Reis]. Piri Reis Sempozyumu. Harbiye, Istanbul: Istanbul Military Museum. Archived from the original on 16 May 2015.
- Heinrich, Paul (2001). "Fingerprints of the Gods Re: Piri Reis Map". Hall of Maat. Self-published. Louisiana State University: Louisiana Geological Survey.
- Hepworth, Paul (2005). "Production and Date of the Walters' 'Kitab-i Bahriye'". The Journal of the Walters Art Museum. 63: 73–80. JSTOR 20650882.
- Hess, Andrew C. (1970). "The Evolution of the Ottoman Seaborne Empire in the Age of the Oceanic Discoveries, 1453-1525". The American Historical Review. 75 (7): 1892–1919. doi:10.2307/1848022.
- Hillgarth, Jocelyn N. (1978). The Spanish Kingdoms: 1250–1516. Volume II: 1410–1516, Castilian Hegemony. Oxford: Clarendon Press. ISBN 978-0-19-822531-7.
- İnan, Afet; Yolaç, Leman (1954). The Oldest Map of America, Drawn by Piri Reis. Ankara: Türk Tarih Kurumu Basimevi. OCLC 2435662.
- İnan, Afet (2020) [1974]. Piri Reis'in Hayatı ve Eserleri (in Turkish) (7th ed.). Ankara: Türk Tarih Kurumu Yayınları. ISBN 978-975-16-0443-9.
- Isom-Verhaaren, Christine (2022). The Sultan's Fleet: Seafarers of the Ottoman Empire. London, New York, Oxford, New Delhi and Sydney: I.B. Tauris. ISBN 978-0-7556-4173-4.
- Kahle, Paul E. (October 1933). "A Lost Map of Columbus". Geographical Review. 23 (4): 621–638. doi:10.2307/209247.
- Khair, Tabish, ed. (2006). "Piri Reis: The Voyages of a 'Corsair' (c. 1526)". Other Routes: 1500 Years of African and Asian Travel Writing. Oxford: Signal. ISBN 978-0-253-21821-6.
- King, Robert J. (2022). "The Depiction of the Ocean on the 1519 World Map of Lopo Homem". The Globe (92): 13–25. ISSN 0311-3930.
- Kunzelman, Cameron (11 November 2025). Everything Is Permitted: On Assassin's Creed. Minneapolis, MN: University of Minnesota Press. ISBN 978-1-4529-7364-7.
- Lepore, Fortunato; Piccardi, Marco; Rombai, Leonardo (2013). "Looking at the Kitab-i Bahriye of Piri Reis" (PDF). E-Perimetron. 8 (2): 85–94. ISSN 1790-3769.
- Liedl, Gottfried (2009). "Seefahrt im Islamischen Westen: Spätmittelalter und Frühe Neuzeit" (PDF). In Marboe, Alexander; Obenaus, Andreas (eds.). Seefahrt und Die Frühe Europäische Expansion (in German). Wien: Mandelbaum Verlag. ISBN 978-3-85476-299-7.
- Malekandathil, Pius (2010). Maritime India-Trade, Religion and Polity in the Indian Ocean. Delhi: Primus Books. ISBN 978-93-80607-01-6.
- Massetti, Marco; Veracini, Cecilia (2016). "The Zoomorphic Representations of the Pîrî Reis Map (1513)" (PDF). Anthropozoologica. 51 (1): 41–54. doi:10.5252/az2016n1a3.
- McIntosh, Gregory C. (2000a). The Piri Reis Map of 1513. Athens, Georgia: University of Georgia Press. ISBN 978-0-8203-4359-4.
- McIntosh, Gregory C. (2000b). "The Tale of Two Admirals: Columbus and the Piri Reis Map of 1513". Mercator's World. 5 (3): 18–23. ISSN 1086-6728.
- McIntosh, Gregory C. (2014). "The Piri Reis Map of 1513: Art and Literature in the Service of Science". Seapower, Technology, and Trade: Studies in Turkish Maritime History (Digital ed.). Istanbul: Piri Reis University. ISBN 978-9944-264-51-8.
- McIntosh, Gregory C. (August 2015). "The Piri Reis Map of 1528: A Comparative Study with Other Maps of the Time". Mediterranea. Ricerche Storiche (34): 303–318. ISSN 1828-230X.
- Mikaberidze, Alexander (2011). Conflict and Conquest in the Islamic World: A Historical Encyclopedia. Vol. 2. Santa Barbara, California: ABC-CLIO. ISBN 978-1-59884-336-1.
- Muhaj, Ardian (December 2014). Ottoman Corsairs in the Atlantic During the 16th Century: Murat Rais, the Albanian and the First Ottoman Expedition to the Canary Islands. International Symposium of Piri Reis and Turkish Maritime History. Ankara: Türk Tarịhi Kurumu. ISBN 978-975-16-2915-9.
- Nebenzahl, Kenneth (1990). Atlas of Columbus and the Great Discoveries. Chicago: Rand McNally. ISBN 978-0-528-83407-3.
- NHHC (21 April 2016). "Mapiro (SS-376)". Dictionary of American Naval Fighting Ships. Naval History and Heritage Command. OCLC 2794587.
- Ökte, Ertuğrul Zekâi, ed. (1988). Kitab-ı Bahriye. Ankara: Historical Research Foundation, İstanbul Research Center. ISBN 978-975-17-0280-7.
- Önalp, Ertuğrul (2010). "The Military Expedition of Piri Reis to Hormuz and the Considerations of Turkish and Portuguese Historians About his Execution". Ankara Üniversitesi Dil ve Tarih-Coğrafya Fakültesi Tarih Bölümü Tarih Araştırmaları Dergisi (in Turkish). 29 (47): 1–21. doi:10.1501/Tarar_0000000453.
- Orhonlu, Cengiz (20 April 1970). "Hint Kaptanlığı ve Piri Reis". Belleten (in Turkish). 34 (134): 235–254. doi:10.37879/ttkbelleten.1191525 (inactive 9 May 2026).
- Oxford Companion to Ships and the Sea. Oxford Reference Online (2nd ed.). Oxford: Oxford University Press. 2007. ISBN 978-0-19-172750-4.
- Özbaran, Salih (2009). Ottoman Expansion Toward the Indian Ocean in the 16th Century. Şişli, İstanbul: İstanbul Bilgi University Press. ISBN 978-605-399-062-8.
- Pedani, Maria Pia (August 2015). "Piri Reis in Venetian Documents". Mediterranea. Ricerche Storiche (34): 319–324. ISSN 1828-230X.
- Pinto, Karen (2012). "Searchin' His Eyes, Lookin' for Traces: Piri Reis' World Map of 1513 & Its Islamic Iconographic Connections (A Reading Through Bagdat 334 and Proust)". Journal of Ottoman Studies. 39 (1): 63–94. ISSN 2376-0702.
- Piri Reis (1988) [1526]. Kitab-ı Bahriye. Vol. 3. Ankara: Türk Tarih Kurumu. OCLC 24995082.
- Plackett, Benjamin (Spring 2026). "Pseudoscience on the Ice". Discover. ISSN 0274-7529.
- Pryor, John H. (1988). Geography, Technology, and War Studies in the Maritime History of the Mediterranean, 649–1571. Cambridge: Cambridge University Press. ISBN 978-0-521-34424-1.
- Robinson, Francis (1996). The Cambridge Illustrated History of the Islamic World. London: Cambridge University Press. ISBN 978-0-521-43510-9.
- Sanuto, Marino (1970). "MDXVIII". I Diarii de Marion Sanuto [The Diaries of Marino Sanudo] (in Italian). Vol. 25. Forni Editore. hdl:2027/wu.89097748107.
- Sanuto, Marino (1903). I Diarii de Marion Sanuto [The Diaries of Marino Sanudo] (in Italian). Vol. 58. Forni Editore. hdl:2027/wu.89097748578.
- Sarıcaoğlu, Fikret (2009). "Cartography". In Ágoston, Gábor; Masters, Bruce Alan (eds.). Encyclopedia of the Ottoman Empire. New York: Infobase Publishing. ISBN 978-0-8160-6259-1.
- Sebastian, Peter Mario Lucian (1988). Turkish Prosopography in the Diarii of Marino Sanuto: 1496-1517 / 902-923 (PhD thesis). Vol. 1. University of London. doi:10.25501/SOAS.00037717.
- Şengör, Ali Mehmet Celâl (2004). Piri Reis'in Haritası Nasıl Bulundu? [Who Discovered the 1513 Map of Piri Reis?]. Piri Reis Sempozyumu (in Turkish). Harbiye, Istanbul: Istanbul Military Museum. Oturum 1: Piri Reis'in Hayatının İncelenmesi. Archived from the original on 25 October 2007.
- Shaw, Stanford J. (1976). "The Apogee of Ottoman Power, 1451-156: The Eastern Seas". History of the Ottoman Empire and Modern Turkey. Vol. 1. Cambridge: Cambridge University Press. ISBN 978-0-521-29163-7.
- Soucek, Svat (1976). "Tunisia in the Kitab-i Bahriye of Piri Reis". Archivum Ottomanicum. 5: 129–296. ISSN 0378-2808.
- Soucek, Svat (1992). "Islamic Charting in the Mediterranean" (PDF). In Harley, J. B.; Woodward, D. (eds.). Cartography in the Traditional Islamic and South Asian Societies. Vol. 2. Chicago: University of Chicago Press. ISBN 978-0-226-31635-2.
- Soucek, Svat (1994). "Piri Reis and Ottoman Discovery of the Great Discoveries". Studia Islamica (79): 121–142. doi:10.2307/1595839.
- Soucek, Svat (1996) [1992]. Piri Reis and Turkish Mapmaking After Columbus: The Khalili Portolan Atlas. Studies in the Khalili Collection. Vol. 2 (2nd ed.). London: The Nour Foundation. ISBN 978-0-19-727501-6.
- Soucek, Svat (2004). "Naval Aspects of the Ottoman Conquests of Rhodes, Cyprus and Crete". Studia Islamica (98/99): 219–261. JSTOR 20059216.
- Soucek, Svat (2011). Studies in Ottoman Naval History and Maritime Geography. Piscataway, NJ: Gorgias Press. ISBN 978-1-61719-150-3.
- Soucek, Svat (2013). "His Uniqueness Among Cartographers and Hydrographers of the Renaissance" (PDF). Cartes & Géomatique (216): 135–144.
- Stanley, Bruce (2007). "Aden". In Dumper, Michael; Stanley, Bruce (eds.). Cities of the Middle East and North Africa: A Historical Encyclopedia. Santa Barbara, California: ABC-CLIO. ISBN 978-1-57607-919-5.
- Stunkel, Kenneth R. (1967). "Reviewed Work(s): Maps of the Ancient Sea Kings: Evidence of Advanced Civilization in the Ice Age by Charles Hapgood". Geographical Review. 57 (3): 440–442. doi:10.2307/212645.
- Tekeli, Sevim (1985). "The Map of America by Piri Reis". Erdem. 1 (3): 673–683. doi:10.32704/erdem.1985.3.673.
- "Turkey's First-Generation Submarine Piri Reis Hits the Seas". Hürriyet Daily News. 22 December 2019. ISSN 1304-6640.
- Viscusi, Peter L (1 September 2022). "Venetian Merchants Dominate Trade with the East". EBSCO. Salem Press. EBSCOhost 89454056.
- White, Joshua M. (2018). Piracy and Law in the Ottoman Mediterranean. Stanford: Stanford University Press. ISBN 978-1-5036-0252-6.
- Yilmaz, Ibrahim (August 2010). "The Kitab-ı Bahriye (Book of Navigation) of Piri Reis". The Cartographic Journal. 47 (3): 278–283. doi:10.1179/000870410X12708074472152.
