= Cengiz Orhonlu =

Turkish historian (1927–1976)

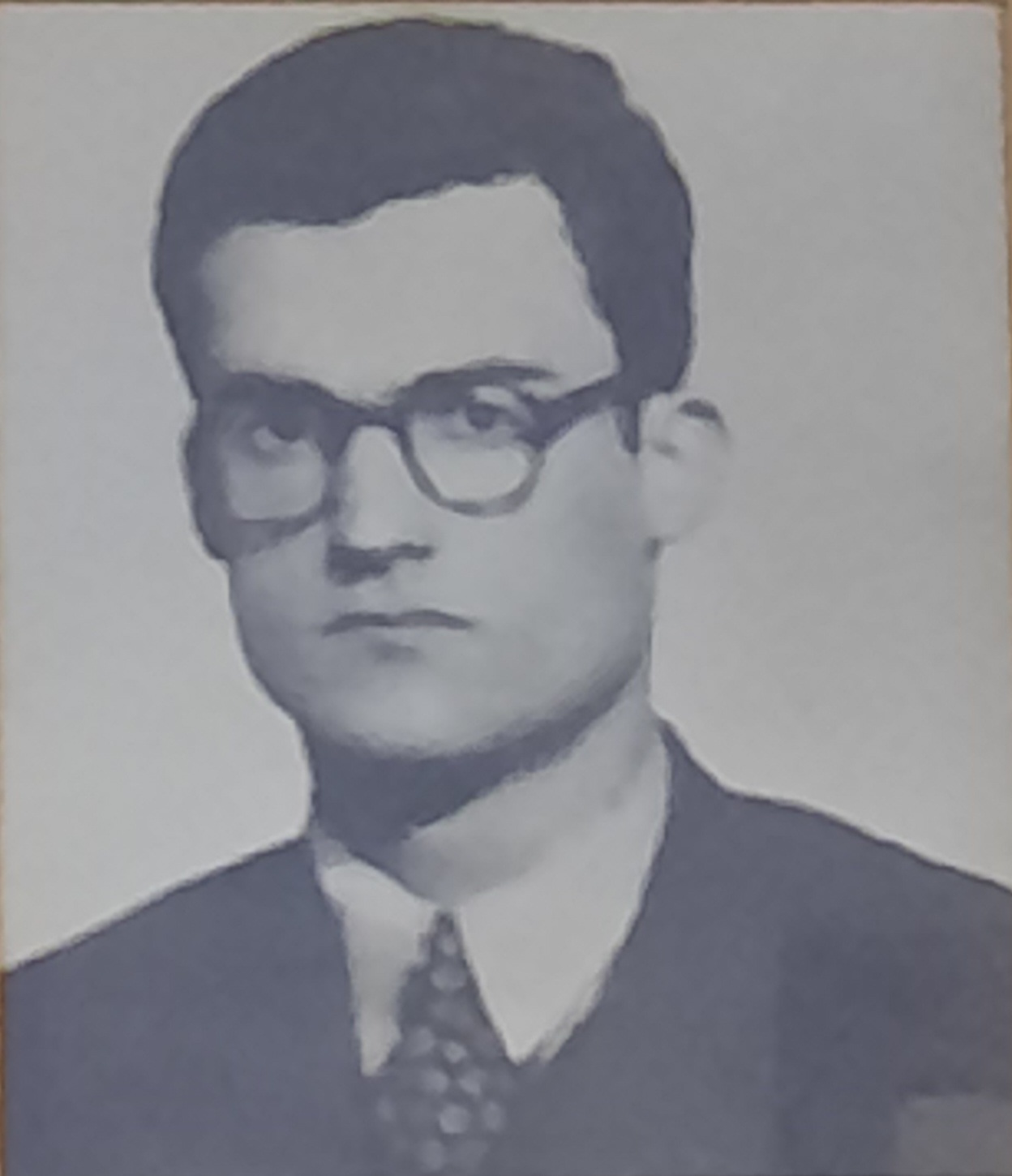
- Born: July 17, 1927 Niksar, Tokat
- Died: June 11, 1976 (aged 48) Istanbul
- Occupation: historian; academician; writer
- Education: Istanbul University
- Notable works: Osmanlı İmparatorluğunda Derbend Teşkilâtı

Cengiz Orhonlu (17 July 1927 – 11 June 1976) was a Turkish historian known particularly for his research on the Ottoman Empire's settlement policy and Ottoman–Ethiopian relations. He was born in Niksar, Tokat, in Turkey. His father, İsmail Seyfettin Bey, was a local elementary school teacher, and his mother was Melâhat Hanım. His family later relocated to Istanbul, where he attended the 61st Elementary School and Kumkapı Middle School, and graduated from Istanbul High School in 1945.

After graduating from the Department of History at Istanbul University's Faculty of Letters in 1951, Orhonlu fulfilled his military service. From 1952 to 1954, he worked with Ottoman archival documents at the Ottoman archives in Istanbul as a telhisçi (palaeographer). He earned his doctorate between 1955 and 1958, doing research on the Ottoman Empire's initiative to settle nomadic tribes (1691–1696), and he subsequently achieved the rank of associate professor with his thesis on the Derbend organization. He was among the first scholars to conduct research in the neglected field of Ottoman maritime history, including the empire's Red Sea coast, the 1559 Bahrain expedition, the boat trade in Istanbul, naval commander Seydi Ali Reis, and Indian Ocean admiral Piri Reis.

In 1959, Orhonlu received a scholarship from the Canadian government and spent a year at McGill University's Institute of Islamic Studies. In Montreal, he started research on Ottoman–Ethiopian relations that became a focus of his later scholarship. Orhonlu conducted research on the Ottoman Empire's southern policy. His research also covered the administrative organization and institutions of the Ottoman Empire, and he wrote on water supply systems, the Ottoman Turkish settlement of Cyprus, the divan as a settlement unit, the introduction of the Târîh-i Medînetü'l-hükemâ, a history of Athens, and bridge-building.

Promoted to the rank of professor in 1971 with his study on Ottoman–Ethiopian relations, later published as Osmanlı İmparatorluğu'nun Güney Siyaseti: Habeş Eyaleti (1974), Orhonlu focused on Ottoman international relations. Orhonlu was elected a corresponding member of the Turkish Historical Society in 1970 and a full member in 1973. He was also a member of the Institute for Research on Turkish Culture. Orhonlu also founded the journal Güney-Doğu Avrupa Araştırmaları Dergisi and took an active role in producing Istanbul University's Tarih Dergisi and Tarih Enstitüsü Dergisi. He edited the Türk Dünyası El Kitabı and was a frequent contributor to the journal Türk Kültürü, published by the Institute for Research on Turkish Culture.

Orhonlu was married to historian Gönül Orhonlu, to whom he dedicated the 1974 monograph. The couple had two children. On 11 June 1976, Orhonlu died of heart failure in Istanbul. He was buried in the family cemetery at Feriköy, Istanbul. After his death, a selection of his studies was collected and published as Osmanlı İmparatorluğunda Şehircilik ve Ulaşım Üzerine Araştırmalar, edited by Salih Özbaran.

== Selected works ==
- Osmanlıların Habeşistan Siyaseti, 1540–1560, TTK Bildiriler, VI [1967], pp. 413–423.
- Osmanlı İmparatorluğunda Derbend Teşkilâtı (İstanbul 1967).
- Osmanlı Tarihine Âid Belgeler: Telhîsler, 1597–1607, İstanbul 1970.
- Osmanlı İmparatorluğu'nun Güney Siyaseti: Habeş Eyaleti, İstanbul 1974.
- Turkish archival sources on Ethiopia (Roma 1974).
- Divan: A Historical Term in the Settlement Geography of Turkey, Disputationes ad Montium Vocabula III, (10. International Congress of Onomastic Sciences), Wien, 1969, pp. 89–93.
- Meslekî Bir Teşekkül Olarak Kaldırımcılık ve Osmanlı Şehir Yolları Hakkında Bazı Düşünceler (GDAAD 1 [1972], pp. 93–138).
- Fındıklı Semtinin Tarihi Hakkında Bir Araştırma (TD 10 [1954], pp. 61–78; 11-12 [1956], pp. 51–70).
- Hint Kaptanlığı ve Pîrî Reis (TTK Belleten, XXXIV/134 [1970], pp. 235–254).
- XVI. Asrın İlk Yarısında Kızıldeniz Sahillerinde Osmanlılar (TD, 16 [1962], pp. 1–24).
- 1559 Bahreyn Seferine Âid Bir Rapor (TD 22 [1968], pp. 1–16).
- Seydî Ali Reis (TED, 1 [1970], pp. 39–56).
- Osmanlı-Bornu Münâsebetine Âid Belgeler (TD 23 [1969], pp. 111–130).

== General references ==
- Şahin, İlhan. "Orhonlu, Cengiz". İslam Ansiklopedisi. Vol. 33. pp. 393–394.
- "In Memoriam: Professor Cengiz Orhonlu, I927–1976" (PDF). Int. J. Middle East Stud (8): 409–410. 1977.
- Şakiroğlu, Mahmut H. (20 October 1976). "Cengiz Orhonlu 1927 - 1976". Belleten (in Turkish). 40 (160): 669–686. IZLIK: JA48RB64ES.
