= Maria Pia Pedani =

Italian historian (died 2019)

Maria Pia Pedani (19 October 1952 - 1 March 2019) was an Italian historian and an honorary member of the Turkish Historical Society (Türk Tarih Kurumu).

She was a graduate of Ca’ Foscari University of Venice and the University of Trieste. She completed her doctorate in history at the University of Szeged. She worked in the Venetian Archive from 1979 to 1999, after which she earned the position of associate professor in the department of Asian and North African Studies. At this university, she taught courses on Ottoman and Middle Eastern history, focusing mainly on Ottoman-Venetian relations. She was known for her research studies dealing with Ottoman-Venetian relations through peace treaties, descriptions of frontiers, and diplomatic documents. In Turkish, she published such works as In the Name of the Ottoman Sultan: Ottomans Sent to Venice From the Conquest of Istanbul to the Cretan War [Osmanlı Padişahının Adına: İstanbul’un Fethinden Girit Savaşı’na Venedik’e Gönderilen Osmanlılar (Ankara: Türk Tarih Kurumu, 2011)]; Venice, the Port of the East [Doğu’nun Kapısı Venedik (İstanbul: Küre Yayınları, 2015) / original title: Venezia, Porta d’Oriente (Bologna: Il Mulino, 2010)]; and The Great Ottoman Kitchen [Osmanlı’nın Büyük Mutfağı (Ankara: Hece Yayınları, 2018) / original title La grande cucina ottomana (Bologna: Il Mulino, 2012]. Pedani published one article in the Türkiye Diyanet Foundation’s Encyclopedia of Islam (TDV İslâm Ansiklopedisi).

Following her death, she was commemorated on 13 October 2019, in a symposium organized by the History Program of Sabancı University and the Italian Language and Literature Department of the Faculty of Language, History, and Geography (DTCF) at Ankara University.

The Journal of Turkish Studies published a Festschrift on her work.
