= Contemporary Turkish literature =

The time that can be called contemporary in Turkish literature falls in the period between the middle of the 20th century and the first years of the new millennium. Throughout this period many changes in literary discourse have occurred. Together with the fall of the Ottoman Empire and foundation of the Turkish Republic brought a different way to Turkish literature together with the effect of Westernization on Turkish writers. The literature of the new republic emerged largely from the pre-independence National Literature movement, with its roots simultaneously in the Turkish folk tradition and in the Western notion of progress. One important change to Turkish literature was enacted in 1928, when Mustafa Kemal initiated the creation and dissemination of a modified version of the Latin alphabet to replace the Arabic-based Ottoman script. Over time, this change—together with changes in Turkey's system of education— would lead to more widespread literacy in the country. In 1950s, Turkish authors started to write in the tone of their western contemporaries bringing a new sense of literature to the country.

All of the salient aspects of Turkish life, politics and culture have found their direct or indirect expression in poetry, fiction, and drama, as well as in critical and scholarly writing. The themes and concerns have included nationalism, social justice, search for modernity. Westernization, revival of folk culture, economic and technological progress, human dignity, mysticism, pluralistic society, human rights and fundamental freedoms, democratic ideals, Atatürkism, Turanism, Marxist–Leninist ideology, revival of Islam, humanism in fact all aspect and components of contemporary culture found a voice in literature.

All stages of modern Turkish history (reforms under Atatürk, 1923–38; consolidation under Inonu, 1938–59; democracy under Menderes, 1950–60) have been marked by the thrust of literary modernization. Since the mid-nineteenth century, the most vital debate of Turkish literature has been between the proponents of art for art's sake and the advocates of commitment to realism and social causes. Mustafa Kemal in a conversation that took place in 1921, about two years before he proclaimed the Republic, exhorted the 19 years old Nazim Hikmet, already a famous poet, who would soon embrace the communist ideology and influence the course of modern Turkish literature, particularly poetry, more profoundly than anyone else. Since 1950, there has been a massive output, in all genres, depicting the plight of the lumpen proletariat. But surrealism, neosymbolism, theater of the absurd, stream of consciousness, hermeticism, black comedy and so on have also flourished.

== History ==
In 1923, when the Republic of Turkey was proclaimed, the influential social thinker Ziya Gökalp wrote: "We belong to Turkish nation, the Islamic community, and Western civilization... Our literature must go the people and, at the same time, towards the West."

Revolution, innovation, and Westernization have been driving forces of the Turkish nation in the twentieth century. The 19th century men of letters inherited the classical and the folk traditions but turned their attention to the literary tastes and movements of the West- particularly of France and England. The Ottoman state embarked upon process of transformation usually referred to as 'Westernization'.

== Major authors ==
Contemporary Turkish Literature consists of many prolific authors whose works both shaped and improved the overall picture of Turkish literature. Mehmet Akif Ersoy, a master of heroic diction, a major figure in early modern Turkish literature, devoted much of his verse to the dogma, and passion. His nationalism has a strong Islamic content, evident in the lyrics of the Turkish national anthem that he wrote. Yahya Kemal Beyatli was the much-acclaimed neoclassicist who produced, in the conventional forms and meters, meticulous lyrics of love, Ottoman grandeur, and Istanbul's natural attractions. Among the dedicated revolutionaries in 20th-century Turkish poetry Nazim Hikmet ranks the highest. He has been a modernizing force since the early 1920s, remaining significant in aesthetics and political terms. A communist, he spent many years in Turkish jails, fled to Soviet Union in 1951 and died in Moscow in 1963. Much of his works laments social injustice, complains of the oppression of the masses, and yearns for revolutionary change. In the mid-1950s a brave new genre emerged the 'Village novel' which reached its apogee with Yasar Kemal's Ince Memed (English title Memed, My Hawk; this novel has been translated into 25 languages). He was considered the most famous Turkish novelist not only in Turkey but also in the world press and literary circles. Satirical fiction is dominated by Aziz Nesin, Turkey's best satirist ever. He is one of the most important figures of Turkish literature. He is the author of more than 100 books including poetry and prose. In more than 60 works, Nesin has provided strong indictment of the oppression and brutalization of the common man. A thrust for modernization took place in the early 1940s when Orhan Veli Kanik, Oktay Rifat, and Melih Cevdet Anday launched their poetic realism. Their urge for upheaval was revolutionary. A new generation had initiated obscurantism, continuing from where Asaf Haler Celebi's surrealism had left off in the 1940s. Ilhan Berk perhaps Turkey's most daring and durable poetic innovator, who acted as spokesman for the group (often identified as the Second New) pontificated "Art is for innovation's sake." The forms and values of classical poetry, too, are kept alive by a group of highly accomplished formalists who are clustered mainly around the monthly Hisar which ceased publishing at the end of 1980 after 30 years. His works have been translated into over thirty languages. Enis Batur is another important writer/poet in contemporary Turkish literature. He writes both in Turkish and in English. Some of his works are translated into English by Turkish translators. Orhan Pamuk is probably the best-known Turkish writer around the world mostly because of the Nobel Prize he won in 2006. He is considered one of the most prominent novelists of Turkey.

== Bibliography ==
- Andrews, Walter. Intersections in Turkish literature : essays in honor of James Stewart-Robinson. Ann Arbor: University of Michigan Press, 2001.
- Cayir, Kenan. Islamic Literature in contemporary Turkey : from Epic to Novel. New York:Palgrave Macmillan, 2007.
- Celal, Metin. ed. Çağdaş Türk Edebiyatı Oyku Antolojisi. İstanbul : Bulut Yayın, 1998.
- Halman, Talat S. & Warner, Jayne L. A Brave New Quest: 100 Modern Turkish Poems (Modern Middle East Literature in Translation Series). Syracuse: Syracuse University Press, 2006.
- ---. Contemporary Turkish literature : Fiction and Poetry. Rutherford [N.J.] : Fairleigh Dickinson University Press, c1982.
- ---. The Turkish Muse : views & reviews, 1960s-1990s. Syracuse, N.Y. : Syracuse University Press; New York : Crescent Hill Publications, 2006.
- Kolcu, Ali Ihsan. Çağdaş Türk Dünyası Edebiyatı. Ankara : Salkımsöğüt, 2004.
- Kurdakul, Sukran. Çağdaş Türk Edebiyatı. İstanbul : Broy Yayınları, 1986.
- Mitler, Louis. Contemporary Turkish writers : a critical bio-bibliography of leading writers in the Turkish republican period up to 1980. Bloomington, Indiana : Indiana University, Research Institute for Inner Asian Studies, 1988.
- Moran, Berna. Türk Romanına Eleştirel Bir Bakış. Vol. 1. ISBN 975-470-054-0.
- Seyhan, Azade. Tales of Crossed Destinies: The Modern Turkish Novel in a Comparative Context (World Literatures Reimagined. Modern Language Associations of America, 2008.
- Teele, Roy.Literature East and West: Modern Turkish Literature.
- Çalışkan, Adem, “Ana Çizgileriyle Cumhuriyet Devri Türk Şiirine Teorik Bir Yaklaşım (1923-1960) (A Theorical Approach to the Turkish Poetry of the Republic Era with Its Guidelines (1923-1960))”, Uluslararası Sosyal Araştırmalar Dergisi / The Journal of International Social Research, Volume: 3, Issue: 10, Winter 2010, pp. 140–199.

== See also ==
- Azerbaijani literature
- Chagatai language
- List of Ottoman poets
