= List of Turkish short story writers =

This is a list of story writers in Turkish and short story writers from Turkey.

== K ==
- Fatih Kırtorun
- Hamed Zubair Koshay
- Yaşar Kemal

== N ==
- Aziz Nesin

== S ==
- Ömer Seyfettin

== T ==
- Hasan Ali Toptaş

== See also ==
- Turkish literature
