= Turkish literature =

Turkish literature (Turkish: Türk edebiyatı, Türk yazını) comprises oral compositions and written texts in the Turkish language. The Ottoman form of Turkish, which forms the basis of much of the written corpus, was highly influenced by Persian literature, and used the Ottoman Turkish alphabet.

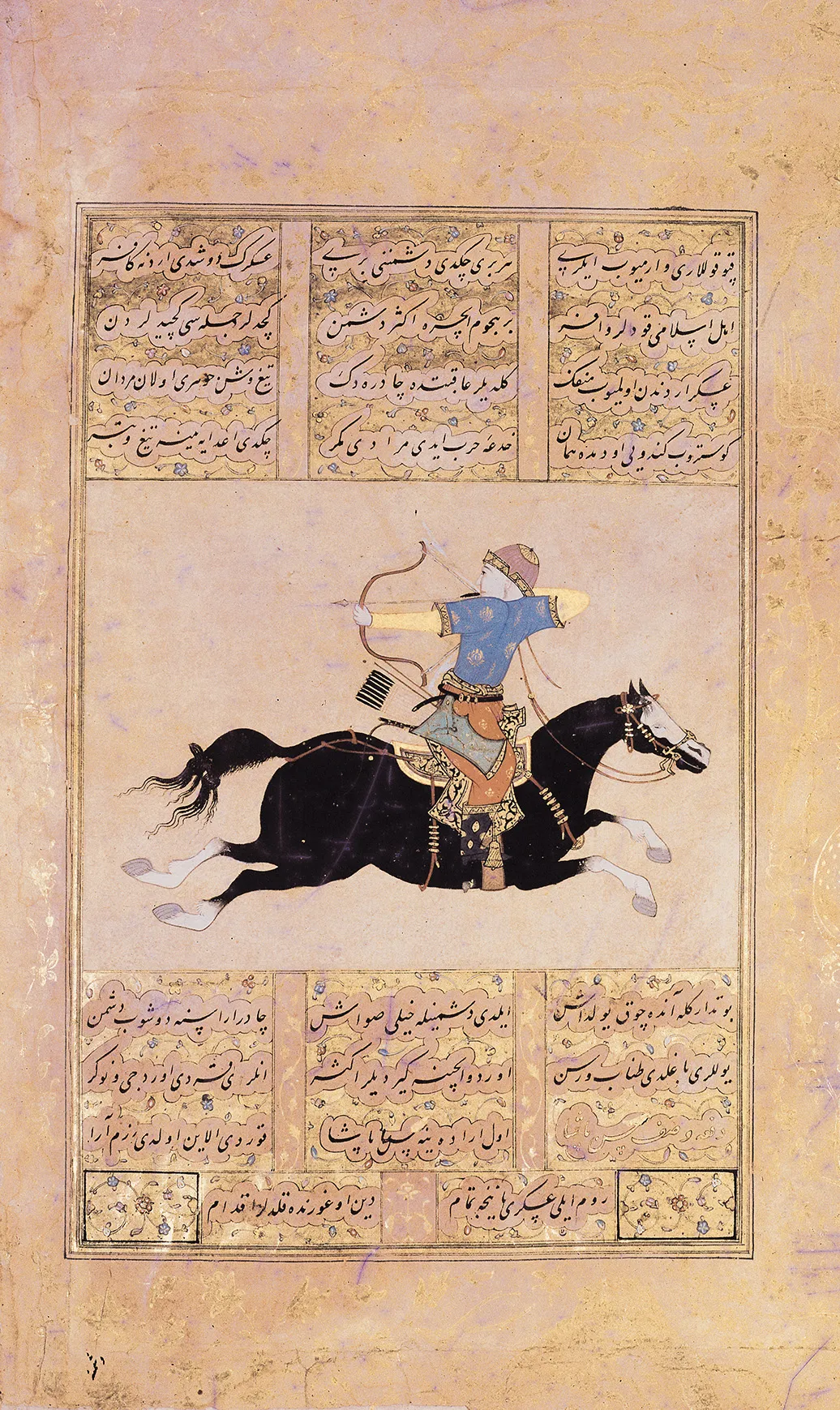
A page from a 15th-century manuscript containing an epic poem in Ottoman Turkish.

The history of the broader Turkic literature spans a period of nearly 1,300 years. The oldest extant records of written Turkic are the Orhon inscriptions, found in the Orhon River valley in central Mongolia and dating to the 7th century. Subsequent to this period, between the 9th and 11th centuries, there arose among the nomadic Turkic peoples of Central Asia a tradition of oral epics, such as the Book of Dede Korkut of the Oghuz Turks— ancestors of the modern Turkish people—and the Epic of Manas of the Kyrgyz people.

Beginning with the victory of the Seljuks at the Battle of Manzikert in the late 11th century, the Oghuz Turks began to settle in Anatolia, and in addition to the earlier oral traditions there arose a written literary tradition issuing largely—in terms of themes, genres, and styles—from Persian literature. For the next 900 years, until shortly before the fall of the Ottoman Empire in 1922, the oral and written traditions would remain largely separate from one another. With the founding of the Republic of Turkey in 1923, the two traditions came together for the first time.

== History ==
The earliest known examples of Turkic poetry date to sometime in the 6th century AD and were composed in the Uyghur language. Some of the earliest verses attributed to Uyghur Turkic writers are only available in Chinese language translations. During the era of oral poetry, the earliest Turkic verses were intended as songs and their recitation a part of the community's social life and entertainment. For example, in the shamanistic and animistic culture of the pre-Islamic Turkic peoples verses of poetry were performed at religious gatherings in ceremonies before a hunt (sığır), at communal feasts following a hunt (şölen). Poetry was also sung at solemn times and elegy called sagu were recited at yuğ funerals and other commemorations of the dead.

Of the long epics, only the Oğuzname has survived in its entirety. The Book of Dede Korkut may have had its origins in the poetry of the 10th century but remained an oral tradition until the 15th century. The earlier written works Kutadgu Bilig and Dīwān Lughāt al-Turk date to the second half of the 11th century and are the earliest known examples of Turkish literature with few exceptions.

One of the most important figures of early Turkish literature was the 13th century Sufi poet Yunus Emre. The golden age of Ottoman literature lasted from the 15th century until the 18th century and included mostly divan poetry but also some prose works, most notably the 10-volume Seyahatnâme (Book of Travels) written by Evliya Çelebi.

== Periodization ==
The periodization of Turkic literature is debated and scholars have floated different proposals to classify the stages of Turkic literary development. One proposal divides Turkic literature into early literature (8th to 19th c.) and modern (19th to 21st c.). Other systems of classification have divided the literature into three periods either pre-Islamic/Islamic/modern or pre-Ottoman/Ottoman/modern. Yet another more complex approach suggests a 5-stage division including both pre-Islamic (until the 11th century) and pre-Ottoman Islamic (between the 11th and 13th centuries). The 5-stage approach further divides modern literature into a transitional period from the 1850s to the 1920s and finally a modern period reaching into the present day.

== The two traditions of Turkish literature ==
Throughout most of its history, Turkish literature has been rather sharply divided into two different traditions, neither of which exercised much influence upon the other until the 19th century. The first of these two traditions is Turkish folk literature, and the second is Turkish written literature.

For most of the history of Turkish literature, the salient difference between the folk and the written traditions has been the variety of language employed. The folk tradition, by and large, was an oral tradition carried on by minstrels and remained free of the influence of Persian and Arabic literature, and consequently of those literatures' respective languages. In folk poetry—which is by far the tradition's dominant genre—this basic fact led to two major consequences in terms of poetic style:

- folk poetry made use of syllabic verse, as opposed to the qualitative verse employed in the written poetic tradition
- the basic structural unit of folk poetry became the quatrain (Turkish: dörtlük) rather than the couplets (Turkish: beyit) more commonly employed in written poetry

Furthermore, Turkish folk poetry has always had an intimate connection with song—most of the poetry was, in fact, expressly composed so as to be sung—and so became to a great extent inseparable from the tradition of Turkish folk music.

In contrast to the tradition of Turkish folk literature, Turkish written literature—prior to the founding of the Republic of Turkey in 1923—tended to embrace the influence of Persian and Arabic literature. To some extent, this can be seen as far back as the Seljuk period in the late 11th to early 14th centuries, where official business was conducted in the Persian language, rather than in Turkish, and where a court poet such as Dehhanî—who served under the 13th century sultan Ala ad-Din Kay Qubadh I—wrote in a language highly inflected with Persian.

When the Ottoman Empire arose early in the 14th century, in northwestern Anatolia, it continued this tradition. The standard poetic forms—for poetry was as much the dominant genre in the written tradition as in the folk tradition—were derived either directly from the Persian literary tradition (the gazel غزل; the mesnevî مثنوی), or indirectly through Persian from the Arabic (the kasîde قصيده). However, the decision to adopt these poetic forms wholesale led to two important further consequences:

- the poetic meters (Turkish: aruz) of Persian poetry were adopted;
- Persian- and Arabic-based words were brought into the Turkish language in great numbers, as Turkish words rarely worked well within the system of Persian poetic meter.

Out of this confluence of choices, the Ottoman Turkish language—which was always highly distinct from spoken Turkish—was effectively born. This style of writing under Persian and Arabic influence came to be known as "Divan literature" (Turkish: divan edebiyatı), dîvân (ديوان) being the Ottoman Turkish word referring to the collected works of a poet.

Just as Turkish folk poetry was intimately bound up with Turkish folk music, so did Ottoman Divan poetry develop a strong connection with Turkish classical music, with the poems of the Divan poets often being taken up to serve as song lyrics.

== Folk literature ==
Turkish folk literature is an oral tradition deeply rooted, in its form, in Central Asian nomadic traditions. However, in its themes, Turkish folk literature reflects the problems peculiar to a settled (or settling) people who have abandoned the nomadic lifestyle. One example of this is the series of folktales surrounding the figure of Keloğlan, a young boy beset with the difficulties of finding a wife, helping his mother to keep the family house intact, and dealing with the problems caused by his neighbors. Another example is the rather mysterious figure of Nasreddin, a trickster who often plays jokes, of a sort, on his neighbors.

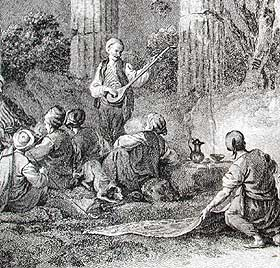
An aşık performing in Anatolia, from an 18th-century Western engraving

Nasreddin also reflects another significant change that had occurred between the days when the Turkish people were nomadic and the days when they had largely become settled in Anatolia; namely, Nasreddin is a Muslim Imam. The Turkic peoples had first become Islamized sometime around the 9th or 10th century, as is evidenced from the clear Islamic influence on the 11th century Karakhanid work the Kutadgu Bilig ("Wisdom of Royal Glory"), written by Yusuf Has Hajib. The religion henceforth came to exercise an enormous influence on Turkish society and literature, particularly the heavily mystically oriented Sufi and Shi'a varieties of Islam. The Sufi influence, for instance, can be seen clearly not only in the tales concerning Nasreddin but also in the works of Yunus Emre, a towering figure in Turkish literature and a poet who lived at the end of the 13th and beginning of the 14th century, probably in the Karamanid state in south-central Anatolia. The Shi'a influence, on the other hand, can be seen extensively in the tradition of the aşıks, or ozans, who are roughly akin to medieval European minstrels and who traditionally have had a strong connection with the Alevi faith, which can be seen as something of a homegrown Turkish variety of Shi'a Islam. It is, however, important to note that in Turkish culture, such a neat division into Sufi and Shi'a is scarcely possible: for instance, Yunus Emre is considered by some to have been an Alevi, while the entire Turkish aşık/ozan tradition is permeated with the thought of the Bektashi Sufi order, which is itself a blending of Shi'a and Sufi concepts. The word aşık (literally, "lover") is in fact the term used for first-level members of the Bektashi order.

Because the Turkish folk literature tradition extends in a more or less unbroken line from about the 10th or 11th century to today, it is perhaps best to consider the tradition from the perspective of genre. There are three basic genres in the tradition: epic; folk poetry; and folklore.

=== The epic tradition ===
The Turkish epic has its roots in the Central Asian epic tradition that gave rise to the Book of Dede Korkut; written in the Azerbaijani language – and recognizably similar to modern Istanbul Turkish – the form developed from the oral traditions of the Oghuz Turks (a branch of the Turkic peoples which migrated towards western Asia and eastern Europe through Transoxiana, beginning in the 9th century). The Book of Dede Korkut endured in the oral tradition of the Oghuz Turks after settling in Anatolia. Alpamysh is an earlier epic, still preserved in the literature of various Turkic peoples of Central Asia in addition to its important place in the Anatolian tradition.

The Book of Dede Korkut was the primary element of the Azerbaijani–Turkish epic tradition in the Caucasus and Anatolia for several centuries. Concurrent to the Book of Dede Korkut was the so-called Epic of Köroğlu, which concerns the adventures of Rüşen Ali ("Köroğlu", or "son of the blind man") as he exacted revenge for the blinding of his father. The origins of this epic are somewhat more mysterious than those of the Book of Dede Korkut: many believe it to have arisen in Anatolia sometime between the 15th and 17th centuries; more reliable testimony, though, seems to indicate that the story is nearly as old as that of the Book of Dede Korkut, dating from around the dawn of the 11th century. Complicating matters somewhat is the fact that Köroğlu is also the name of a poet of the aşık/ozan tradition.

The epic tradition in modern Turkish literature may be seen in the Epic of Shaykh Bedreddin (Şeyh Bedreddin Destanı), published in 1936 by the poet Nâzım Hikmet Ran (1901–1963). This long poem – which concerns an Anatolian shaykh's rebellion against the Ottoman Sultan Mehmed I — is a modern epic, yet draws upon the same independent-minded traditions of the Anatolian people as depicted in the Epic of Köroğlu. Many of the works of the 20th-century novelist Yaşar Kemal (1923–2015 ), such as the 1955 novel Memed, My Hawk (İnce Memed), can be considered modern prose epics continuing this long tradition.

=== Folk poetry ===
The folk poetry tradition in Turkish literature, as indicated above, was strongly influenced by the Islamic Sufi and Shi'a traditions. Furthermore, as partly evidenced by the prevalence of the still existent aşık/ozan tradition, the dominant element in Turkish folk poetry has always been song. The development of folk poetry in Turkish—which began to emerge in the 13th century with such important writers as Yunus Emre, Sultan Veled, and Şeyyâd Hamza—was given a great boost when, on 13 May 1277, Karamanoğlu Mehmet Bey declared Turkish the official state language of Anatolia's powerful Karamanid state; subsequently, many of the tradition's greatest poets would continue to emerge from this region.

There are, broadly speaking, two traditions (or schools) of Turkish folk poetry:

- the aşık/ozan tradition, which—although much influenced by religion, as mentioned above—was for the most part a secular tradition;
- the explicitly religious tradition, which emerged from the gathering places (tekkes) of the Sufi religious orders and Shi'a groups.

Much of the poetry and song of the aşık/ozan tradition, being almost exclusively oral until the 19th century, remains anonymous. There are, however, a few well-known aşıks from before that time whose names have survived together with their works: the aforementioned Köroğlu (16th century); Karacaoğlan (1606?–1689?), who may be the best-known of the pre-19th century aşıks; Dadaloğlu (1785?–1868?), who was one of the last of the great aşıks before the tradition began to dwindle somewhat in the late 19th century; and several others. The aşıks were essentially minstrels who travelled through Anatolia performing their songs on the bağlama, a mandolin-like instrument whose paired strings are considered to have a symbolic religious significance in Alevi/Bektashi culture. Despite the decline of the aşık/ozan tradition in the 19th century, it experienced a significant revival in the 20th century thanks to such outstanding figures as Aşık Veysel Şatıroğlu (1894–1973), Aşık Mahzuni Şerif (1938–2002), Neşet Ertaş (1938–2012), and many others.

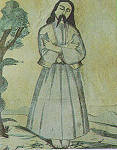
Kaygusuz Abdal

The explicitly religious folk tradition of tekke literature shared a similar basis with the aşık/ozan tradition in that the poems were generally intended to be sung, generally in religious gatherings, making them somewhat akin to Western hymns (Turkish ilahi). One major difference from the aşık/ozan tradition, however, is that—from the very beginning—the poems of the tekke tradition were written down. This was because they were produced by revered religious figures in the literate environment of the tekke, as opposed to the milieu of the aşık/ozan tradition, where the majority could not read or write. The major figures in the tradition of tekke literature are: Yunus Emre (1240?–1320?), who is one of the most important figures in all of Turkish literature; Süleyman Çelebi (?–1422), who wrote a highly popular long poem called Vesîletü'n-Necât (وسيلة النجاة "The Means of Salvation", but more commonly known as the Mevlid), concerning the birth of the Islamic prophet Muhammad; Kaygusuz Abdal (1397–?), who is widely considered the founder of Alevi/Bektashi literature; and Pir Sultan Abdal (?–1560), whom many consider to be the pinnacle of that literature.

== Ottoman literature ==
The two primary streams of Ottoman written literature are poetry and prose. Of the two, poetry—specifically, Divan poetry—was by far the dominant stream. Moreover, until the 19th century, Ottoman prose did not contain any examples of fiction; that is, there were no counterparts to, for instance, the European romance, short story, or novel (though analogous genres did, to some extent, exist in both the Turkish folk tradition and in Divan poetry).

=== Divan poetry ===
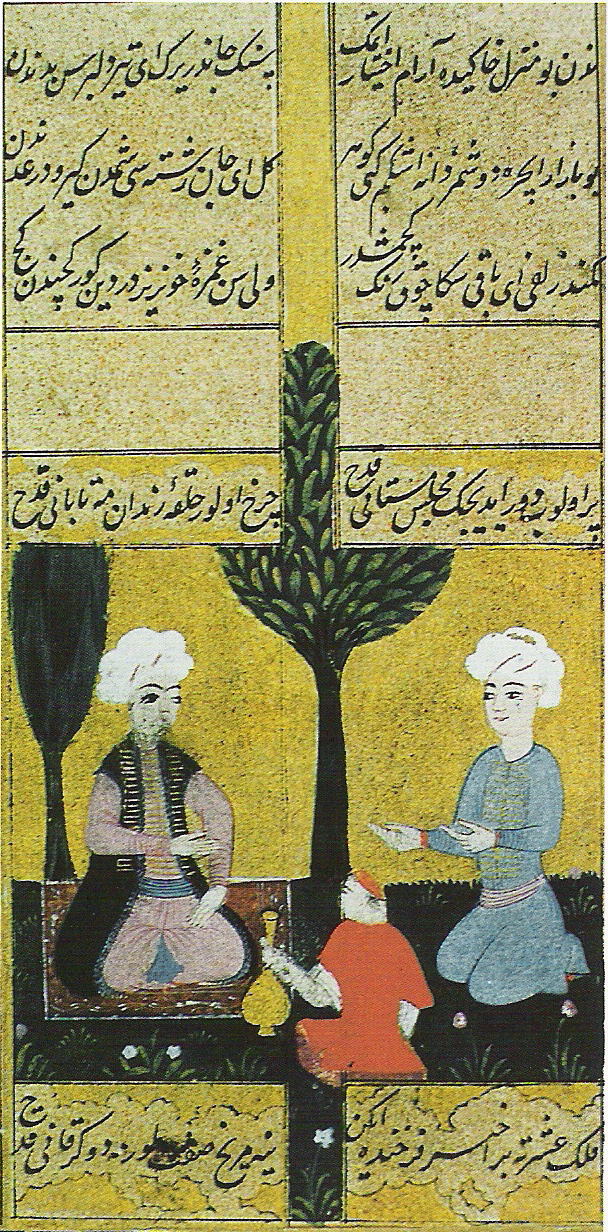
An Ottoman garden party, with poet, guest, and cup-bearer; from the 16th-century Dîvân-ı Bâkî

Ottoman Divan poetry was a highly ritualized and symbolic art form. From the Persian poetry that largely inspired it, it inherited a wealth of symbols whose meanings and interrelationships—both of similitude (مراعات نظير mura'ât-i nazîr / تناسب tenâsüb) and opposition (تضاد tezâd)—were more or less prescribed. Examples of prevalent symbols that, to some extent, oppose one another include, among others:

- the nightingale (بلبل bülbül)—the rose (ﮔل gül)
- the world (جهان cihan; عالم ‘âlem)—the rosegarden (ﮔﻠﺴﺘﺎن gülistan; ﮔﻠﺸﻦ gülşen)
- the ascetic (زاهد zâhid)—the dervish (درويش derviş)

As the opposition of "the ascetic" and "the dervish" suggests, Divan poetry—much like Turkish folk poetry—was heavily influenced by Sufi thought. One of the primary characteristics of Divan poetry, however—as of the Persian poetry before it—was its mingling of the mystical Sufi element with a profane and even erotic element. Thus, the pairing of "the nightingale" and "the rose" simultaneously suggests two different relationships:

- the relationship between the fervent lover ("the nightingale") and the inconstant beloved ("the rose")
- the relationship between the individual Sufi practitioner (who is often characterized in Sufism as a lover) and God (who is considered the ultimate source and object of love)

Similarly, "the world" refers simultaneously to the physical world and to this physical world considered as the abode of sorrow and impermanence, while "the rosegarden" refers simultaneously to a literal garden and to the garden of Paradise. "The nightingale", or suffering lover, is often seen as situated—both literally and figuratively—in "the world", while "the rose", or beloved, is seen as being in "the rosegarden".

Divan poetry was composed through the constant juxtaposition of many such images within a strict metrical framework, thus allowing numerous potential meanings to emerge. A brief example is the following line of verse, or mısra (مصراع), by the 18th-century judge and poet Hayatî Efendi:

بر گل مى وار بو گلشن ﻋالمدﻪ خارسز
Bir gül mü var bu gülşen-i ‘âlemde hârsız
("Does any rose, in this rosegarden world, lack thorns?")

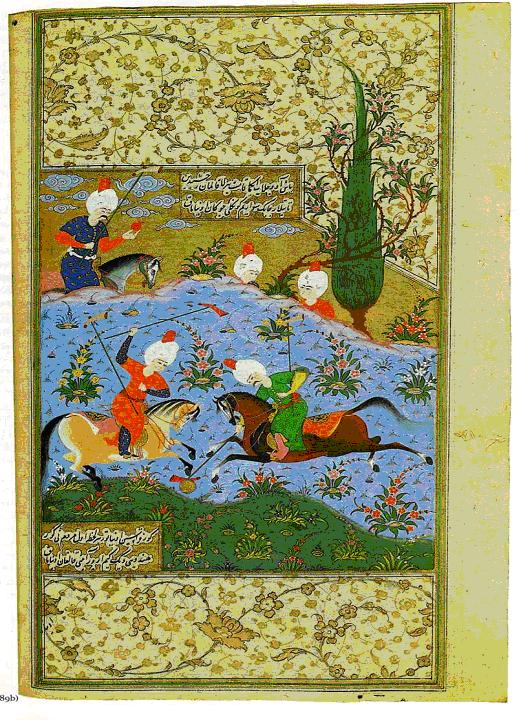
A page from Nava'i's diwan. From the library of Suleiman the Magnificent.

Here, the nightingale is only implied (as being the poet/lover), while the rose, or beloved, is shown to be capable of inflicting pain with its thorns (خار hâr). The world, as a result, is seen as having both positive aspects (it is a rosegarden, and thus analogous to the garden of Paradise) and negative aspects (it is a rosegarden full of thorns, and thus different from the garden of Paradise).

As for the development of Divan poetry over the more than 500 years of its existence, that is—as the Ottomanist Walter G. Andrews points out—a study still in its infancy; clearly defined movements and periods have not yet been decided upon. Early in the history of the tradition, the Persian influence was very strong, but this was mitigated somewhat through the influence of poets such as the Azerbaijani Nesîmî (?–1417?) and the Uzbek Ali Şîr Nevâî (1441–1501), both of whom offered strong arguments for the poetic status of the Turkic languages as against the much-venerated Persian. Partly as a result of such arguments, Divan poetry in its strongest period—from the 16th to the 18th centuries—came to display a unique balance of Persian and Turkish elements.

Although Turkish poets (Ottoman and Chagatay) had been inspired and influenced by classical Persian poetry, it would be a superficial judgment to consider the former as blind imitators of the latter, as is often done. A limited vocabulary and common technique, and the same world of imagery and subject matter based mainly on Islamic sources, were shared by all poets of Islamic literature.

Despite the lack of certainty regarding the stylistic movements and periods of Divan poetry, however, certain highly different styles are clear enough, and can perhaps be seen as exemplified by certain poets:

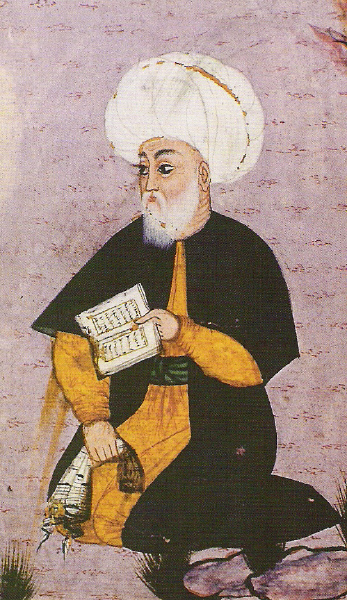
Fuzûlî (1483?–1556), a Divan poet of Azerbaijani origin

- Fuzûlî (1483?–1556); a unique poet who wrote with equal skill in Azerbaijani, Persian, and Arabic, and who came to be as influential in Persian as in Divan poetry
- Hayâlî (1500?–1557); a poet that lived in the Divan tradition
- Bâkî (1526–1600); a poet of great rhetorical power and linguistic subtlety whose skill in using the pre-established tropes of the Divan tradition is quite representative of the poetry in the time of Süleyman the Magnificent
- Nef‘î (1570?–1635); a poet considered the master of the kasîde (a kind of panegyric), as well as being known for his harshly satirical poems, which led to his execution
- Nâbî (1642–1712); a poet who wrote a number of socially oriented poems critical of the stagnation period of Ottoman history
- Nedîm (1681?–1730); a revolutionary poet of the Tulip Era of Ottoman history, who infused the rather élite and abstruse language of Divan poetry with numerous simpler, populist elements
- Şeyh Gâlib (1757–1799); a poet of the Mevlevî Sufi order whose work is considered the culmination of the highly complex so-called "Indian style" (سبك هندى sebk-i hindî)

The vast majority of Divan poetry was lyric in nature: either gazels (which make up the greatest part of the repertoire of the tradition), or kasîdes. There were, however, other common genres, most particularly the mesnevî, a kind of verse romance and thus a variety of narrative poetry; the two most notable examples of this form are the Leylî vü Mecnun (ليلى و مجنون) of Fuzûlî and the Hüsn ü Aşk (حسن و عشق; "Beauty and Love") of Şeyh Gâlib.

=== Early Ottoman prose ===
Until the 19th century, Ottoman prose never managed to develop to the extent that contemporary Divan poetry did. A large part of the reason for this was that much prose was expected to adhere to the rules of sec' (سجع, also transliterated as seci), or rhymed prose, a type of writing descended from the Arabic saj' and which prescribed that between each adjective and noun in a sentence, there must be a rhyme.

Nevertheless, there was a tradition of prose in the literature of the time. This tradition was exclusively nonfictional in nature—the fiction tradition was limited to narrative poetry. A number of such nonfictional prose genres developed:

- the târih (تاريخ), or history, a tradition in which there are many notable writers, including the 15th-century historian Aşıkpaşazâde and the 17th-century historians Kâtib Çelebi and Naîmâ
- the seyâhatnâme (سياحت نامه), or travelogue, of which the outstanding example is the 17th-century Seyahâtnâme of Evliya Çelebi
- the sefâretnâme (سفارت نامه), a related genre specific to the journeys and experiences of an Ottoman ambassador, and which is best exemplified by the 1718–1720 Paris Sefâretnâme of Yirmisekiz Mehmed Çelebi, ambassador to the court of Louis XV of France
- the siyâsetnâme (سياست نامه), a kind of political treatise describing the functionings of state and offering advice for rulers, an early Seljuk example of which is the 11th-century Siyāsatnāma, written in Persian by Nizam al-Mulk, vizier to the Seljuk rulers Alp Arslan and Malik Shah I
- the tezkîre (تذکره), a collection of short biographies of notable figures, some of the most notable of which were the 16th-century tezkiretü'ş-şuarâs (تذكرة الشعرا), or biographies of poets, by Latîfî and Aşık Çelebi
- the münşeât (منشآت), a collection of writings and letters similar to the Western tradition of belles-lettres
- the münâzara (مناظره), a collection of debates of either a religious or a philosophical nature

=== The 19th century and Western influence ===
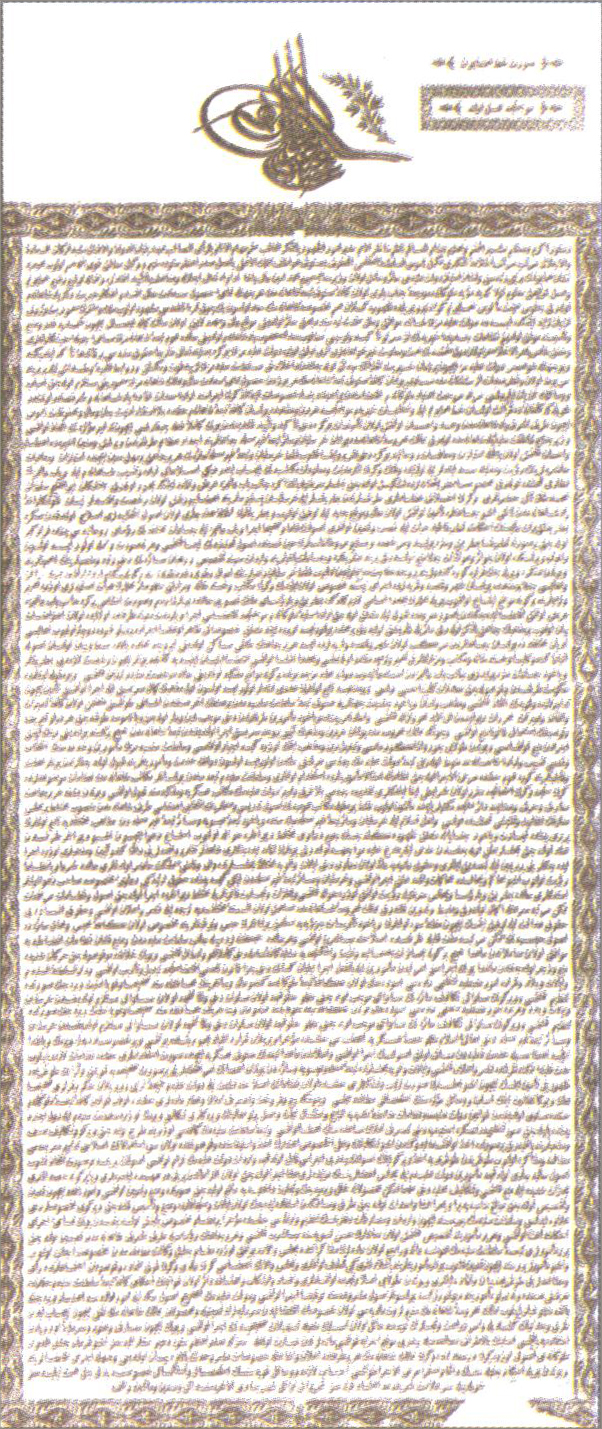
Edict of Gülhane was an 1839 proclamation by Ottoman sultan Abdülmecid I that launched the Tanzimât period of reforms and reorganization in the Ottoman Empire.

By the early 19th century, the Ottoman Empire had become moribund. Attempts to right this situation had begun during the reign of Sultan Selim III, from 1789 to 1807, but were continuously thwarted by the powerful Janissary corps. As a result, only after Sultan Mahmud II had abolished the Janissary corps in 1826 was the way paved for truly effective reforms (Ottoman Turkish: تنظيمات tanzîmât).

These reforms finally came to the empire during the Tanzimat period of 1839–1876, when much of the Ottoman system was reorganized along largely French lines. The Tanzimat reforms "were designed both to modernize the empire and to forestall foreign intervention".

Along with reforms to the Ottoman system, serious reforms were also undertaken in the literature, which had become nearly as moribund as the empire itself. Broadly, these literary reforms can be grouped into two areas:

- changes brought to the language of Ottoman written literature;
- the introduction into Ottoman literature of previously unknown genres.

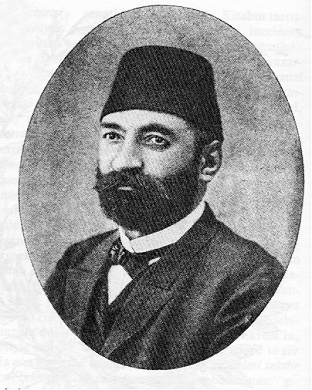
Muallim Naci (1850–1893)

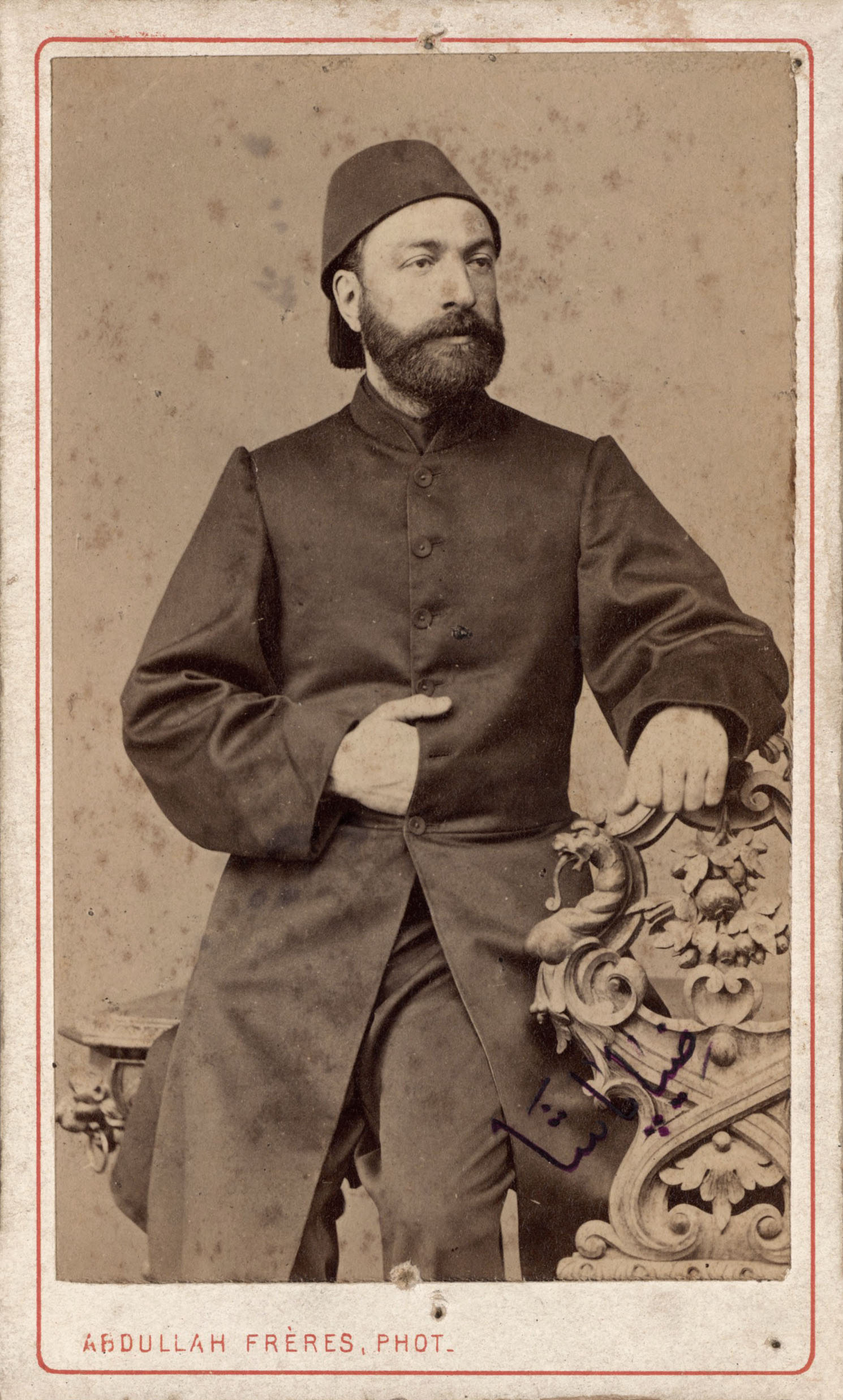
Ziya Pasha (1829–1880), Turkish poet and reformist

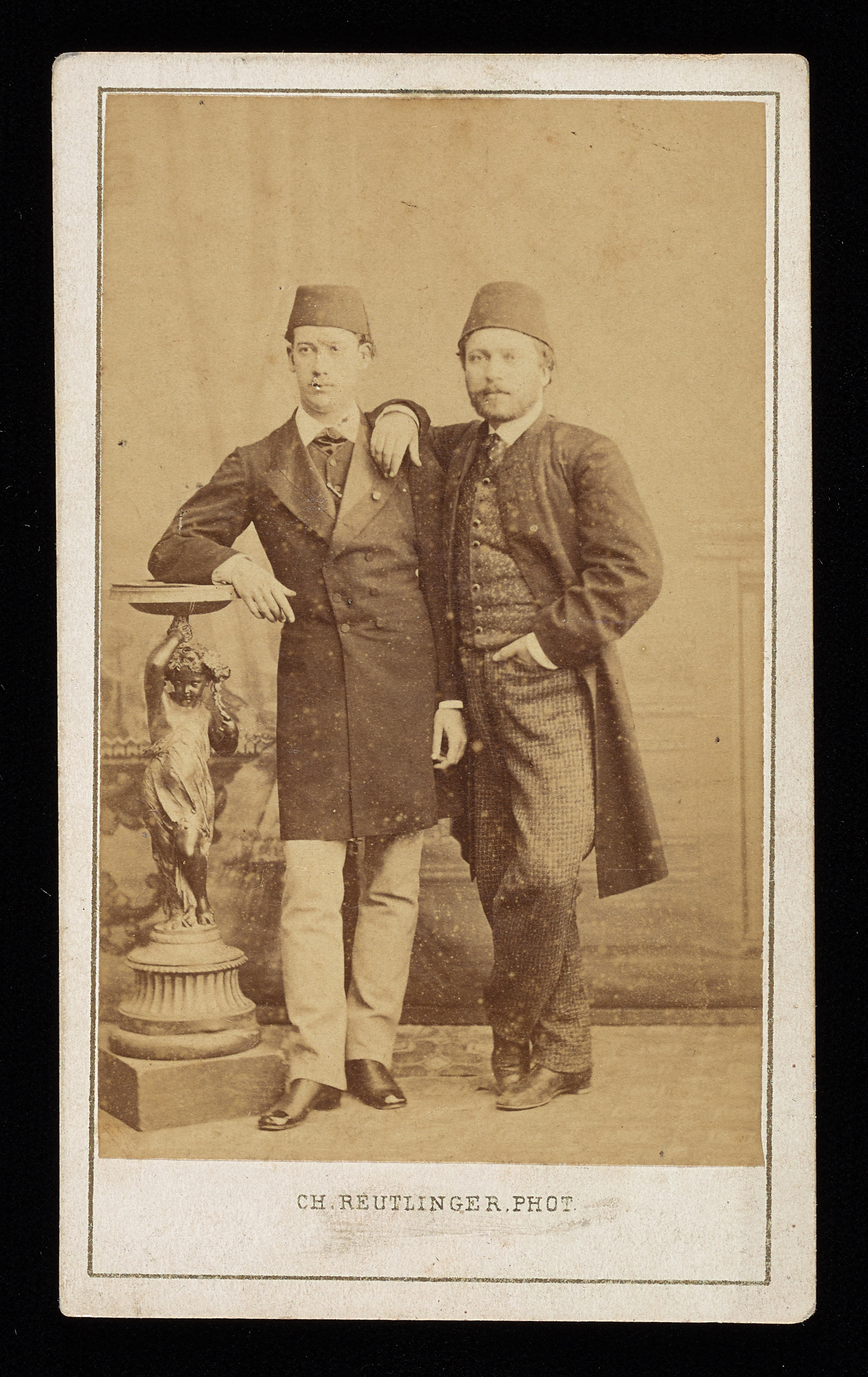
Namık Kemal (on the right) (1840–1888), Turkish writer, intellectual, reformer, journalist and political activist

The reforms to the literary language were undertaken because the Ottoman Turkish language was thought by the reformists to have effectively lost its way. It had become more divorced than ever from its original basis in Turkish, with writers using more and more words and even grammatical structures derived from Persian and Arabic, rather than Turkish. Meanwhile, however, the Turkish folk literature tradition of Anatolia, away from the capital Constantinople, came to be seen as an ideal. Accordingly, many of the reformists called for written literature to turn away from the Divan tradition and towards the folk tradition; this call for change can be seen, for example, in a famous statement by the poet and reformist Ziya Pasha (1829–1880):

Our language is not Ottoman; it is Turkish. What makes up our poetic canon is not gazels and kasîdes, but rather kayabaşıs, üçlemes, and çöğürs, which some of our poets dislike, thinking them crude. But just let those with the ability exert the effort on this road [of change], and what powerful personalities will soon be born!

At the same time as this call—which reveals something of a burgeoning national consciousness—was being made, new literary genres were being introduced into Ottoman literature, primarily the novel and the short story. This trend began in 1861, with the translation into Ottoman Turkish of François Fénelon's 1699 novel Les aventures de Télémaque, by Hüseyin Avni Pasha, to Sultan Abdülaziz. What is widely recognized as the first Turkish novel, Taaşuk-u Tal'at ve Fitnat (تعشق طلعت و فطنت; "Tal'at and Fitnat in Love") by Şemsettin Sami (also known as Sami Frashëri) (1850–1904), was published just ten years later, in 1872. However, there had actually been, according to Gonca Gökalp, five other earlier or contemporaneous works of fiction that were clearly distinct from earlier prose traditions in both Divan and folk literature, and that approximate novelistic form. Among these five works is the Muhayyelât of Ali Aziz Efendi, cited above. Another, 1851's Akabi Hikâyesi ("Akabi's Story"), written by the Armenian Vartan Pasha (Hovsep Vartanian) using the Armenian script and for an Armenian audience was, according to Andreas Tietze, "the first genuine modern novel written and published in Turkey". The introduction of such new genres into Turkish literature can be seen as part of a trend towards Westernization that continues to be felt in Turkey to this day.

Due to historically close ties with France—strengthened during the Crimean War of 1854–1856—it was French literature that came to constitute the major Western influence on Turkish literature throughout the latter half of the 19th century. As a result, many of the same movements prevalent in France during this period also had their equivalents in the Ottoman Empire: in the developing Ottoman prose tradition, for instance, the influence of Romanticism can be seen during the Tanzimat period, and that of the Realist and Naturalist movements in subsequent periods; in the poetic tradition, on the other hand, it was the influence of the Symbolist and Parnassian movements that became paramount.

Many of the writers in the Tanzimat period wrote in several different genres simultaneously: for instance, the poet Namık Kemal (1840–1888) also wrote the important 1876 novel İntibâh (انتباه; "Awakening"), while the journalist İbrahim Şinasi (1826–1871) is noted for writing, in 1860, the first modern Turkish play, the one-act comedy "Şair Evlenmesi" (شاعر اولنمسى; "The Poet's Marriage"). In a similar vein, the novelist Ahmed Midhat Efendi (1844–1912) wrote important novels in each of the major movements: Romanticism (حسن ملاح ياخود سر ايچيڭده اسرار Hasan Mellâh yâhud Sırr İçinde Esrâr, 1873; "Hasan the Sailor, or The Mystery Within the Mystery"), Realism (هﻨﻮز اون يدى يشکده Henüz On Yedi Yaşında, 1881; "Just Seventeen Years Old"), and Naturalism (مشاهدات Müşâhedât, 1891; "Observations"). This diversity was, in part, due to the Tanzimat writers' wish to disseminate as much of the new literature as possible, in the hopes that it would contribute to a revitalization of Ottoman social structure.

== Early 20th-century Turkish literature ==
Most of the roots of modern Turkish literature were formed between the years 1896—when the first collective literary movement arose—and 1923, when the Republic of Turkey was officially founded. Broadly, there were three primary literary movements during this period:

- the Edebiyyât-ı Cedîde (ادبيات جدیده; "New Literature") movement
- the Fecr-i Âtî (فجر آتى; "Dawn of the Future") movement
- the Millî Edebiyyât (ملى ادبيات; "National Literature") movement

=== The New Literature movement ===
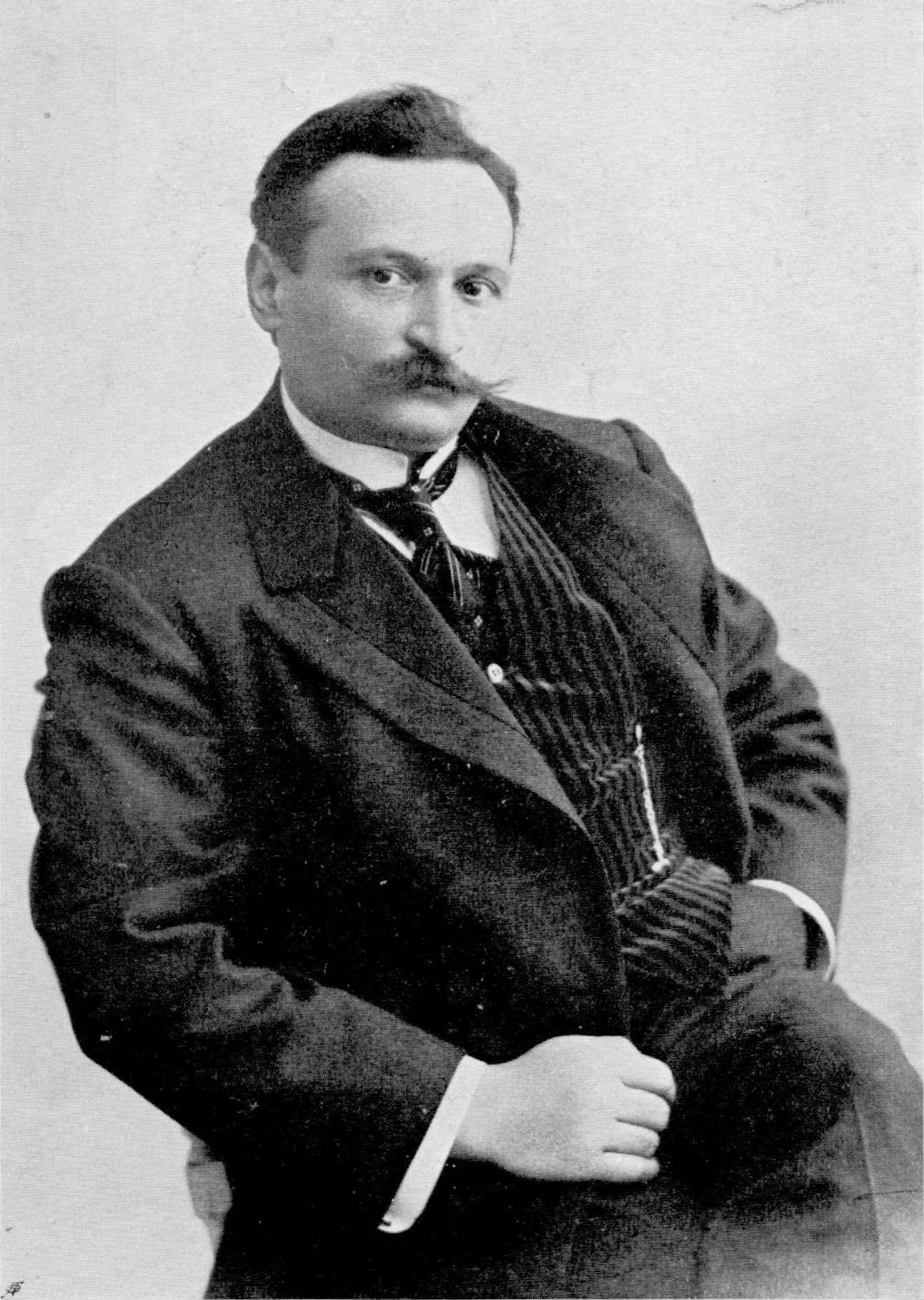
Tevfik Fikret (1867–1915), poet and editor of Servet-i Fünun

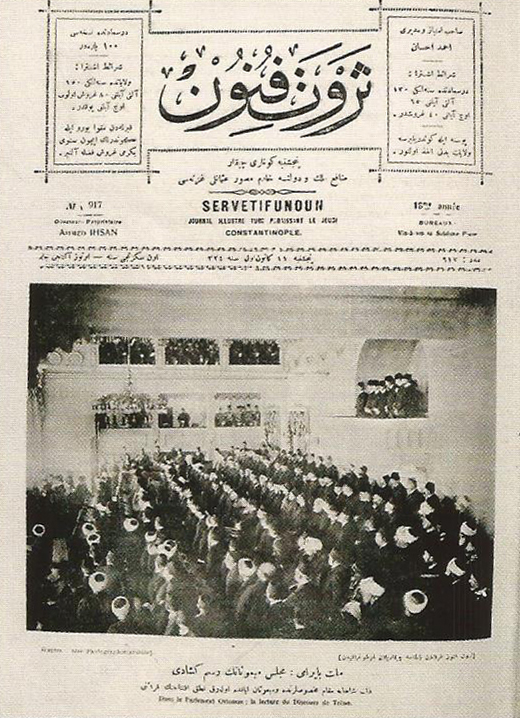
Journal of Servet-i Fünun, edition of 24 April 1908

The Edebiyyât-ı Cedîde, or "New Literature", movement began with the founding in 1891 of the magazine Servet-i Fünûn (ﺛﺮوت ﻓﻨﻮن; "Scientific Wealth"), which was largely devoted to progress—both intellectual and scientific—along the Western model. Accordingly, the magazine's literary ventures, under the direction of the poet Tevfik Fikret (1867–1915), were geared towards creating a Western-style "high art" in Turkey. The poetry of the group—of which Tevfik Fikret and Cenâb Şehâbeddîn (1870–1934) were the most influential proponents—was heavily influenced by the French Parnassian movement and the so-called "Decadent" poets. The group's prose writers, on the other hand—particularly Halit Ziya Uşaklıgil (1867–1945)—were primarily influenced by Realism, although the writer Mehmed Rauf (1875–1931) did write the first Turkish example of a psychological novel, 1901's Eylül (ايلول; "September"). The language of the Edebiyyât-ı Cedîde movement remained strongly influenced by Ottoman Turkish.

In 1901, as a result of the article "Edebiyyât ve Hukuk" (ادبيات و ﺣﻘﻮق; "Literature and Law"), translated from French and published in Servet-i Fünûn, the pressure of censorship was brought to bear and the magazine was closed down by the government of the Ottoman sultan Abdülhamid II. Though it was closed for only six months, the group's writers each went their own way in the meantime, and the Edebiyyât-ı Cedîde movement came to an end.

=== The Dawn of the Future movement ===
In the 24 February 1909 edition of the Servet-i Fünûn magazine, a gathering of young writers—soon to be known as the Fecr-i Âtî ("Dawn of the Future") group—released a manifesto in which they declared their opposition to the Edebiyyât-ı Cedîde movement and their adherence to the credo, "Sanat şahsî ve muhteremdir" (صنعت شخصى و محترمدر; "Art is personal and sacred"). Though this credo was little more than a variation of the French writer Théophile Gautier's doctrine of "l'art pour l'art", or "art for art's sake", the group was nonetheless opposed to the blanket importation of Western forms and styles, and essentially sought to create a recognizably Turkish literature. The Fecr-i Âtî group, however, never made a clear and unequivocal declaration of its goals and principles, and so lasted only a few years before its adherents each went their own individual way. The two outstanding figures to emerge from the movement were, in poetry, Ahmed Hâşim (1884–1933), and in prose, Yakup Kadri Karaosmanoğlu (1889–1974).

=== The National Literature movement ===
Cover page from an issue of Genç Kalemler

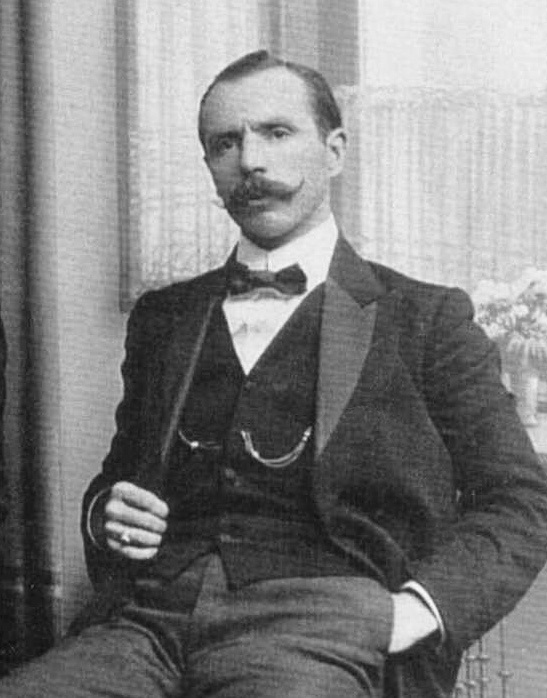
Ali Canip Yöntem, Turkish nationalist writer and politician, who was one of the most prolific poets of the millî edebiyyât

In 1908, Sultan Abdülhamid II had been forced to allow a re-established constitutional government, and the parliament subsequently elected was composed almost entirely of members of the Committee of Union and Progress (also known as the "Young Turks"). The Young Turks (ژون تورکلر Jön Türkler) had opposed themselves to the increasingly authoritarian Ottoman government, and soon came to identify themselves with a specifically Turkish national identity. Along with this notion developed the idea of a Turkish and even pan-Turkish nation (Turkish: millet), and so the literature of this period came to be known as "National Literature" (Turkish: millî edebiyyât). It was during this period that the Persian- and Arabic-inflected Ottoman Turkish language was definitively turned away from as a vehicle for written literature, and that literature began to assert itself as being specifically Turkish, rather than Ottoman.

At first, this movement crystallized around the magazine Genç Kalemler (کنج قلملر; "Young Pens"), which was begun in the city of Selânik in 1911 by the three writers who were most representative of the movement: Ziya Gökalp (1876–1924), a sociologist and thinker; Ömer Seyfettin (1884–1920), a short-story writer; and Ali Canip Yöntem (1887–1967), a poet. In Genç Kalemler's first issue, an article entitled "New Language" (Turkish: "Yeni Lisan") pointed out that Turkish literature had previously looked for inspiration either to the East as in the Ottoman Divan tradition, or to the West as in the Edebiyyât-ı Cedîde and Fecr-i Âtî movements, without ever turning to Turkey itself. This latter was the National Literature movement's primary aim.

The intrinsically nationalistic character of Genç Kalemler, however, quickly took a decidedly chauvinistic turn, and other writers—many of whom, like Yakup Kadri Karaosmanoğlu, had been a part of the Fecr-i Âtî movement—began to emerge from within the matrix of the National Literature movement to counter this trend. Some of the more influential writers to come out of this less far-rightist branch of the National Literature movement were the poet Mehmet Emin Yurdakul (1869–1944), the early feminist novelist Halide Edib Adıvar (1884–1964), and the short-story writer and novelist Reşat Nuri Güntekin (1889–1956).

== Republican literature ==
Following the Ottoman Empire's defeat in the First World War of 1914–1918, the victorious Entente Powers began the process of carving up the empire's lands and placing them under their own spheres of influence. In opposition to this process, the military leader Mustafa Kemal (1881–1938), in command of the growing Turkish National Movement whose roots lay partly in the Young Turks, organized the 1919–1923 Turkish War of Independence. This war ended with the official ending of the Ottoman Empire, the expulsion of the Entente Powers, and the founding of the Republic of Turkey.

The literature of the new republic emerged largely from the pre-independence National Literature movement, with its roots simultaneously in the Turkish folk tradition and in the Western notion of progress. One important change to Turkish literature was enacted in 1928, when Mustafa Kemal initiated the creation and dissemination of a modified version of the Latin alphabet to replace the Arabic-based Ottoman script. Over time, this change—together with changes in Turkey's system of education—would lead to more widespread literacy in the country.

=== Prose ===
Memed, My Hawk (1955), by Yaşar Kemal

Stylistically, the prose of the early years of the Republic of Turkey was essentially a continuation of the National Literature movement, with Realism and Naturalism predominating. This trend culminated in the 1932 novel Yaban ("The Wilds"), by Yakup Kadri Karaosmanoğlu. This novel can be seen as the precursor to two trends that would soon develop: social realism, and the "village novel" (köy romanı). Çalıkuşu ("The Wren") by Reşat Nuri Güntekin addresses a similar theme with the works of Karaosmanoğlu. Güntekin's narrative has a detailed and precise style, with a realistic tone.

The social realist movement is perhaps best represented by the short-story writer Sait Faik Abasıyanık (1906–1954), whose work sensitively and realistically treats the lives of cosmopolitan Istanbul's lower classes and ethnic minorities, subjects which led to some criticism in the contemporary nationalistic atmosphere. The tradition of the "village novel", on the other hand, arose somewhat later. As its name suggests, the "village novel" deals, in a generally realistic manner, with life in the villages and small towns of Turkey. The major writers in this tradition are Kemal Tahir (1910–1973), Orhan Kemal (1914–1970), and Yaşar Kemal (1923[?]–2015). Yaşar Kemal, in particular, has earned fame outside of Turkey not only for his novels—many of which, such as 1955's İnce Memed (Memed, My Hawk), elevate local tales to the level of epic—but also for his firmly leftist political stance. In a very different tradition, but evincing a similar strong political viewpoint, was the satirical short-story writer Aziz Nesin (1915–1995) and Rıfat Ilgaz (1911–1993).

Another novelist contemporary to, but outside of, the social realist and "village novel" traditions is Ahmet Hamdi Tanpınar (1901–1962). In addition to being an important essayist and poet, Tanpınar wrote a number of novels—such as Huzur ("A Mind at Peace", 1949) and Saatleri Ayarlama Enstitüsü ("The Time Regulation Institute", 1961)—which dramatize the clash between East and West in modern Turkish culture and society. Similar problems are explored by the novelist and short-story writer Oğuz Atay (1934–1977). Unlike Tanpınar, however, Atay—in such works as his long novel Tutunamayanlar ("The Good for Nothing", 1971–1972) and his short story "Beyaz Mantolu Adam" ("Man in a White Coat", 1975)—wrote in a more modernist and existentialist vein. On the other hand, Onat Kutlar's İshak ("Isaac", 1959), composed of nine short stories which are written mainly from a child's point of view and are often surrealistic and mystical, represent a very early example of magic realism.

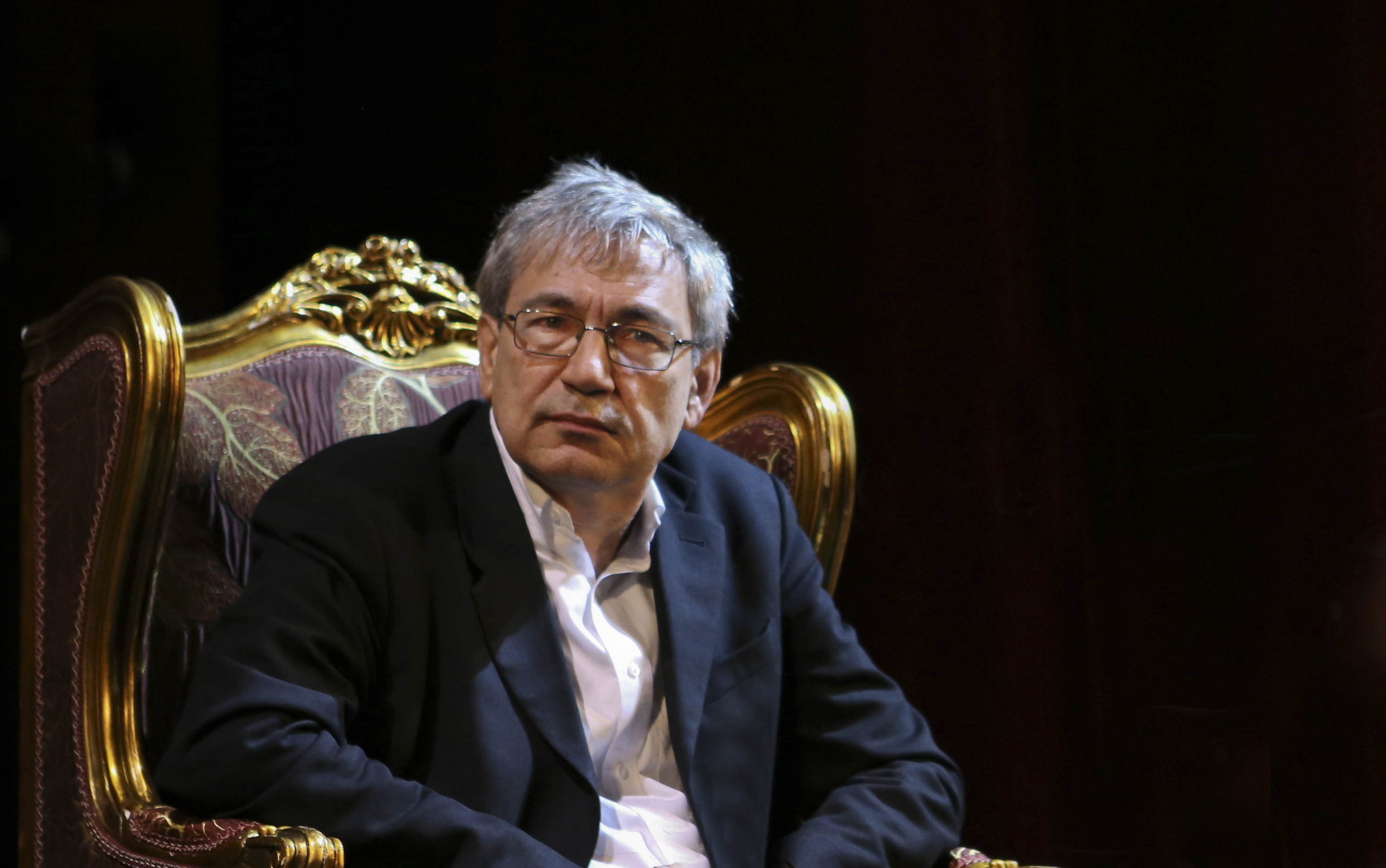
Orhan Pamuk, winner of the 2006 Nobel Prize in Literature

The tradition of literary modernism also informs the work of female novelist Adalet Ağaoğlu (1929– ). Her trilogy of novels collectively entitled Dar Zamanlar ("Tight Times", 1973–1987), for instance, examines the changes that occurred in Turkish society between the 1930s and the 1980s in a formally and technically innovative style. Orhan Pamuk (1952– ), winner of the 2006 Nobel Prize in Literature, is another such innovative novelist, though his works—such as 1990's Beyaz Kale ("The White Castle") and Kara Kitap ("The Black Book") and 1998's Benim Adım Kırmızı ("My Name is Red")—are influenced more by postmodernism than by modernism. This is true also of Latife Tekin (1957– ), whose first novel Sevgili Arsız Ölüm ("Dear Shameless Death", 1983) shows the influence not only of postmodernism, but also of magic realism. Elif Şafak has been one of the most outstanding authors of Turkish literature which has new tendencies in language and theme in 2000s. Şafak was distinguished first by her use of extensive vocabulary and then became one of the pioneers in Turkish literature in international scope as a bilingual author who writes both in Turkish and in English.

A recent study by Can and Patton provides a quantitative analysis of twentieth century Turkish literature using forty novels of forty authors ranging from Mehmet Rauf's (1875–1931) Eylül (1901) to Ahmet Altan's (1950–) Kılıç Yarası Gibi (1998). They show using statistical analysis that, as time passes, words, in terms of both tokens (in text) and types (in vocabulary), have become longer. They indicate that the increase in word lengths with time can be attributed to the government-initiated language reform of the 20th century. This reform aimed at replacing foreign words used in Turkish, especially Arabic- and Persian-based words (since they were in majority when the reform was initiated in the early 1930s), with newly coined pure Turkish neologisms created by adding suffixes to Turkish word stems. Can and Patton; based on their observations of the change of a specific word use (more specifically in newer works the preference of "ama" over "fakat", both borrowed from Arabic and meaning 'but', and their inverse usage correlation is statistically significant); also speculate that the word length increase can influence the common word choice preferences of authors.

=== Poetry ===
In the early years of the Republic of Turkey, there were a number of poetic trends. Authors such as Ahmed Hâşim and Yahyâ Kemâl Beyatlı (1884–1958) continued to write important formal verse whose language was, to a great extent, a continuation of the late Ottoman tradition. By far the majority of the poetry of the time, however, was in the tradition of the folk-inspired "syllabist" movement (Beş Hececiler), which had emerged from the National Literature movement and which tended to express patriotic themes couched in the syllabic meter associated with Turkish folk poetry.

The first radical step away from this trend was taken by Nâzım Hikmet Ran, who—during his time as a student in the Soviet Union from 1921 to 1924—was exposed to the modernist poetry of Vladimir Mayakovsky and others, which inspired him to start writing verse in a less formal style. At this time, he wrote the poem "Açların Gözbebekleri" ("Pupils of the Hungry"), which introduced free verse into the Turkish language for, essentially, the first time. Much of Nâzım Hikmet's poetry subsequent to this breakthrough would continue to be written in free verse, though his work exerted little influence for some time due largely to censorship of his work owing to his Communist political stance, which also led to his spending several years in prison. Over time, in such books as Simavne Kadısı Oğlu Şeyh Bedreddin Destanı ("The Epic of Shaykh Bedreddin, Son of Judge Simavne", 1936) and Memleketimden İnsan Manzaraları ("Human Landscapes from My Country", 1939), he developed a voice simultaneously proclamatory and subtle.

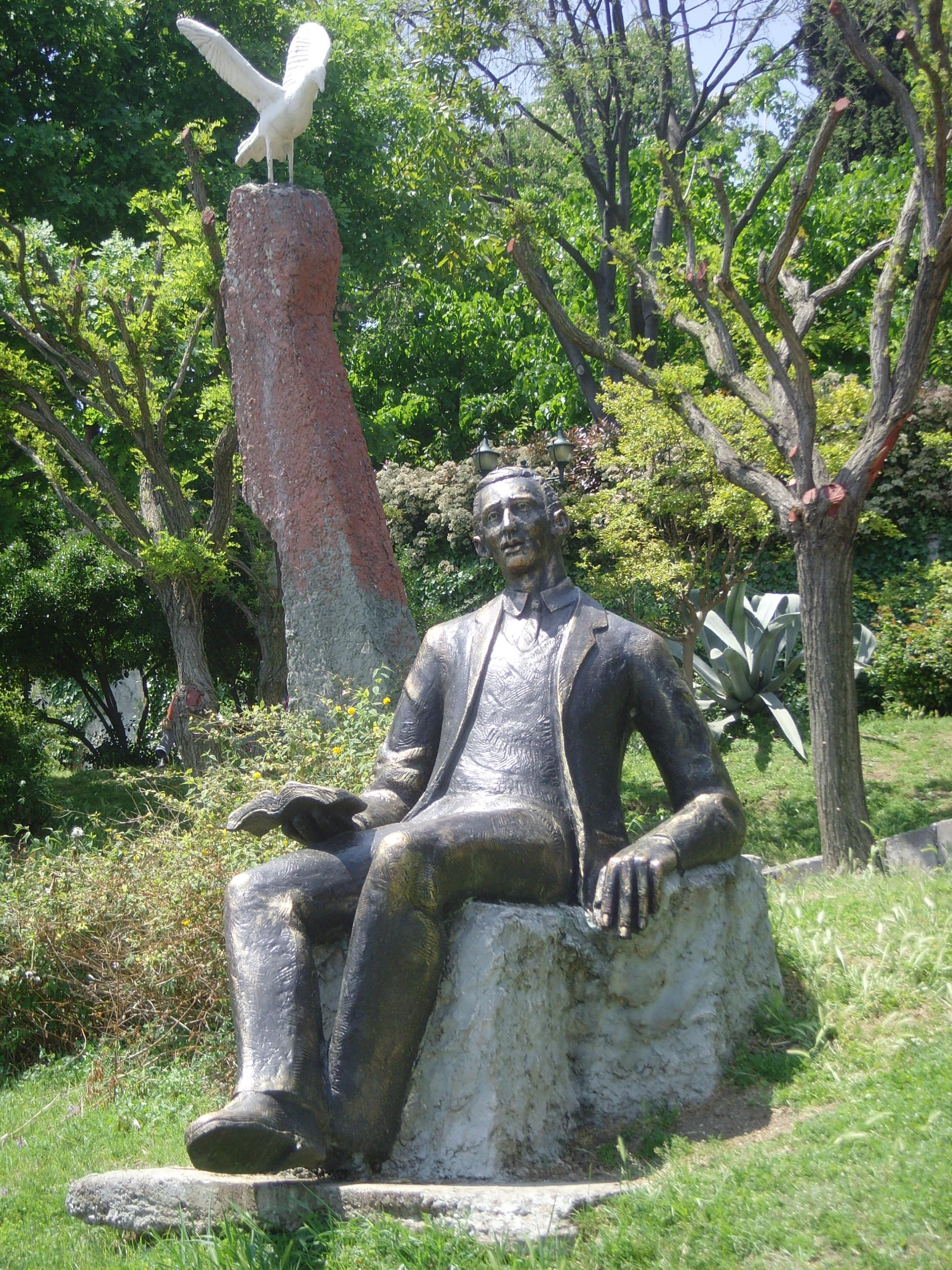
Orhan Veli Kanık (1914–1950) was the founder of the Garip Movement in Turkish poetry.

Another revolution in Turkish poetry came about in 1941 with the publication of a small volume of verse preceded by an essay and entitled Garip ("Strange"). The authors were Orhan Veli Kanık (1914–1950), Melih Cevdet Anday (1915–2002), and Oktay Rifat (1914–1988). Explicitly opposing themselves to everything that had gone in poetry before, they sought instead to create a popular art, "to explore the people's tastes, to determine them, and to make them reign supreme over art". To this end, and inspired in part by contemporary French poets like Jacques Prévert, they employed not only a variant of the free verse introduced by Nâzım Hikmet, but also highly colloquial language, and wrote primarily about mundane daily subjects and the ordinary man on the street. The reaction was immediate and polarized: most of the academic establishment and older poets vilified them, while much of the Turkish population embraced them wholeheartedly. Though the movement itself lasted only ten years—until Orhan Veli's death in 1950, after which Melih Cevdet Anday and Oktay Rifat moved on to other styles—its effect on Turkish poetry continues to be felt today.

Just as the Garip movement was a reaction against earlier poetry, so—in the 1950s and afterwards—was there a reaction against the Garip movement. The poets of this movement, soon known as İkinci Yeni ("Second New",) opposed themselves to the social aspects prevalent in the poetry of Nâzım Hikmet and the Garip poets, and instead—partly inspired by the disruption of language in such Western movements as Dada and Surrealism—sought to create a more abstract poetry through the use of jarring and unexpected language, complex images, and the association of ideas. To some extent, the movement can be seen as bearing some of the characteristics of postmodern literature. The most well-known poets writing in the "Second New" vein were Turgut Uyar (1927–1985), Edip Cansever (1928–1986), Cemal Süreya (1931–1990), Ece Ayhan (1931–2002), Sezai Karakoç (1933– ), İlhan Berk (1918–2008).

Outside of the Garip and "Second New" movements also, a number of significant poets have flourished, such as Fazıl Hüsnü Dağlarca (1914–2008), who wrote poems dealing with fundamental concepts like life, death, God, time, and the cosmos; Behçet Necatigil (1916–1979), whose somewhat allegorical poems explore the significance of middle-class daily life; Can Yücel (1926–1999), who—in addition to his own highly colloquial and varied poetry—was also a translator into Turkish of a variety of world literature; İsmet Özel (1944– ), whose early poetry was highly leftist but whose poetry since the 1970s has shown a strong mystical and even Islamist influence; and Hasan Hüseyin Korkmazgil (1927–1984) who wrote collectivist-realist poetry.

== Book trade ==
30,000 new titles appear yearly, often in small numbers. 9 verso 17 Euro (pro pocket book/hardcover) – at an average earning of less than 600 Euro monthly – are rather unattractive, where illegal copies at bazaars cost two-thirds less. "Official Certificates" for legally published books do not solve the problem, because controlling the illegal book trade remains difficult.

5,000 of 10,000 book shops in Turkey are in Istanbul, including the bookfair and growing licence trading. Turkey was a guest of honour at the Frankfurt Bookfair in 2008.

== Important works of fiction: 1860–present ==
İbrahim Şinasi	Halide Edib Adıvar
	|
Halit Ziya Uşaklıgil	Tarık Buğra
Füruzan	Halikarnas Balıkçısı

- 1860 Şair Evlenmesi İbrahim Şinasi
- 1873 Vatan Yahut Silistre Namık Kemal
- 1900 Aşk-ı Memnu Halit Ziya Uşaklıgil
- 1919 Memleket Hikayeleri Refik Halit Karay
- 1922 Çalıkuşu Reşat Nuri Güntekin
- 1930 Dokuzuncu Hariciye Koğuşu Peyami Safa
- 1932 Yaban Yakup Kadri Karaosmanoğlu
- 1936 Sinekli Bakkal Halide Edib Adıvar
- 1938 Üç İstanbul Mithat Cemal Kuntay
- 1941 Fahim Bey ve Biz Abdülhak Şinasi Hisar
- 1943 Kürk Mantolu Madonna Sabahattin Ali
- 1944 Aganta Burina Burinata Halikarnas Balıkçısı
- 1949 Huzur Ahmet Hamdi Tanpınar
- 1952 Dost Vüs'at O. Bener
- 1954 Alemdağda Var Bir Yılan Sait Faik Abasıyanık
- 1954 Bereketli Topraklar Üzerinde Orhan Kemal
- 1955 İnce Memet Yaşar Kemal
- 1956 Esir Şehrin İnsanları Kemal Tahir
- 1959 Yılanların Öcü Fakir Baykurt
- 1959 Aylak Adam Yusuf Atılgan
- 1960 Ortadirek Yaşar Kemal
- 1962 Saatleri Ayarlama Enstitüsü Ahmet Hamdi Tanpınar
- 1964 Küçük Ağa Tarık Buğra
- 1966 Memleketimden İnsan Manzaraları Nâzım Hikmet
- 1971 Tutunamayanlar Oğuz Atay
- 1973 Parasız Yatılı Füruzan
- 1973 Anayurt Oteli Yusuf Atılgan
- 1979 Bir Düğün Gecesi Adalet Ağaoğlu
- 1982 Cevdet Bey ve Oğulları Orhan Pamuk
- 1983 Sevgili Arsız Ölüm Latife Tekin
- 1990 Kara Kitap Orhan Pamuk
- 1995 Puslu Kıtalar Atlası İhsan Oktay Anar
- 1998 Benim Adım Kırmızı Orhan Pamuk

== See also ==
- Contemporary Turkish literature
- Crimean Tatar literature
- Azerbaijani literature
- Turkmen literature
- Balaibalan
- Chagatai language
- Codex Cumanicus
- List of Ottoman poets
- List of contemporary Turkish poets
- List of Turkish short story writers
- List of Turkish women writers
- List of Turkish writers
- Persian metres

== Notes ==
*Alpamysh, Hasan Bülent Paksoy

== Bibliography ==
- Andrews, Walter G. Ottoman Lyric Poetry: An Anthology. ISBN 0-292-70472-0.
- —. Poetry's Voice, Society's Song. ISBN 0-295-96153-8.
- Belge, Murat. Osmanlı'da Kurumlar ve Kültür. ISBN 975-8998-03-X.
- Bezirci, Asım; ed. Seçme Romanlar: Yazarları, Eserleri, Roman Özetleri, Eleştiriler, Kaynaklar. İstanbul: Evrensel Basım Yayın, 1997.
- Can, Fazlı; Patton, Jon M. "Change of word characteristics in 20th century Turkish literature: A statistical analysis". Journal of Quantitative Linguistics, Vol. 17, No. 3. (2010), pp. 167–190. http://www.tandfonline.com/doi/abs/10.1080/09296174.2010.485444
- Fuat, Mehmet; ed. (2002) "Nâzım Hikmet: Life Story". Tr. Nurgül Kıvılcım Yavuz. Retrieved 1 March 2006.
- Gökalp, G. Gonca. "Osmanlı Dönemi Türk Romanının Başlangıcında Beş Eser" in Hacettepe Üniversitesi Edebiyat Fakültesi Dergisi, pp. 185–202.
- Halman, Talât Sait; ed. tr. "Introduction". Just for the Hell of It: 111 Poems by Orhan Veli Kanık. Multilingual Yabancı Dil Yayınları, 1997.
- Hagen, Gottfried, Sira, Ottoman Turkish, in Muhammad in History, Thought, and Culture: An Encyclopedia of the Prophet of God (2 vols.), Edited by C. Fitzpatrick and A. Walker, Santa Barbara, ABC-CLIO, 2014, Vol. II, pp. 585–597. ISBN 1610691776
- Holbrook, Victoria. "Originality and Ottoman Poetics: In the Wilderness of the New". Journal of the American Oriental Society, Vol. 112, No. 3. (Jul.–Sep. 1992), pp. 440–454.
- Karaalioğlu, Seyit Kemal. Türk Edebiyatı Tarihi. İstanbul: İnkılâp ve Aka Basımevi, 1980.
- —; ed. Ziya Paşa: Hayatı ve Şiirleri. İstanbul: İnkılâp ve Aka Basımevi, 1984.
- Lester, Toby. (1997) "New-Alphabet Disease?". Retrieved 6 March 2006.
- Lewis, Geoffrey (1999). The Turkish Language Reform: A Catastrophic Success. Oxford : Oxford University Press.
- Mansel, Philip. Constantinople: City of the World's Desire, 1453–1924. ISBN 0-14-026246-6.
- Moran, Berna. Türk Romanına Eleştirel Bir Bakış. Vol. 1. ISBN 975-470-054-0.
- Muhtar, İbrahim et al. (2003) "Genç Kalemler". Retrieved 23 February 2006.
- Pala, İskender. Divân Şiiri Antolojisi: Dîvânü'd-Devâvîn. ISBN 975-338-081-X.
- Paskin, Sylvia. (2005) "The cloak of love". Retrieved 5 March 2006.
- Selçuk Üniversitesi Uzaktan Eğitim Programı (SUZEP). "Türk Yazı Dilinin Tarihî Gelişimi". Retrieved 29 May 2006.
- Şafak, Elif. (2005) "There Is No Clash of Civilizations". Retrieved 24 February 2006.
- Şentürk, Ahmet Atilla. Osmanlı Şiiri Antolojisi. ISBN 975-08-0163-6.
- Tanpınar, Ahmet Hamdi. 19'uncu Asır Türk Edebiyatı Tarihi. İstanbul: Çağlayan Kitabevi, 1988.
- Tietze, Andreas; ed. "Önsöz", Akabi Hikyayesi. pp. IX–XXI. İstanbul: Eren Yayıncılık ve Kitapçılık Ltd. Şti., 1991.
- Wolf-Gazo, Ernest. (1996) "John Dewey in Turkey: An Educational Mission". Retrieved 6 March 2006.
