= Katip Şadi =

Turkish kemençe player (1932–2020)

- Born: 24 August 1932; Derekuşçulu, Görele, Giresun Province, Turkey
- Origin: Görele, Turkey
- Died: 12 September 2020 (aged 88)
- Genres: Kemençe
- Occupation: Kemençe player
- Years active: 1942–2020

Katip Şadi (24 August 1932 – 12 September 2020) was a Turkish kemençe player from the Eastern Black Sea Region in Turkey. He was a "Görele-style" player and he was thought to be one of the best living kemençe players in the Black Sea Region.

Şadi was born in Derekuşçulu, Görele, Giresun Province, and began playing kemençe at the age of 10. His kemençe tutor was Kemal İpşir, and his first LP was released in 1962.

== See also ==
- Kemenche
- Picoğlu Osman
