= Turkism, Islamism and Modernism =

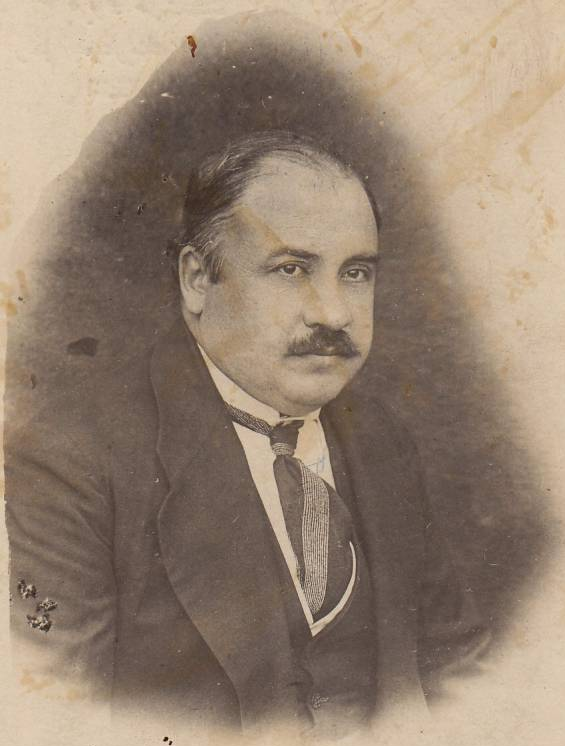
- the author, Ziya Gökalp
- Author: Ziya Gökalp
- Original title: Türkleşmek, İslamlaşmak, Muasırlaşmak
- Language: Turkish
- Genre: Essay
- Publisher: Evkaf-ı İslamiye Matbaası
- Publication date: 1918
- Publication place: Turkey (Ottoman Turkey)

Turkism, Islamism and Modernism (Turkish: Türkleşmek, İslamlaşmak, Muasırlaşmak) is a book written by Ziya Gökalp published in 1918 after the Balkan Wars. The book reflects his perspectives on various subjects and the political landscape of the Ottoman Empire during the writing process of the book, along with his personal political ideologies involving with the issues presented in the book.

The book is a compilation of various essays which were written under the title "Türkleşmek, İslâmlaşmak, Muâsırlaşmak" by Ziya Gökalp around 1913–1914, for literary magazines namely Türk Yurdu (Turkish Land) and İslam Mecmuası (Magazine of Islam), as a serialized work that had been released in different issues. Book is composed of eleven chapters and every chapter contains multiple essays which have episodes where the author expresses personal political views.

== History ==
The book has been first compiled and published in Evkaf-ı İslamiye Matbaası in 1918. Written in fairly plain Ottoman Turkish, the main point of the book was, just like other books of Ziya Gökalp, to inform the Turkish public as part of the National Literature movement. On 24 July 1923, Turkish nation has officially declared independence, in 1923 he was appointed as a "Maarif Vekâleti Telif ve Tercüme" (Ministry of Education Copyright and Translation) minister and consequently died on 25 October 1924 as he was suffering from a certain illness.

In 1930s, as Kemalism was getting popular, the book had a stagnating popularity as the proposal of Turkish–Islamic synthesis had no audience in the general population however book regained popularity in course of 1940s to 1970s. Book has been republished by Ministry of Culture in modern Turkish alphabet, transliterated from Ottoman Turkish alphabet by İbrahim Kutluk, in 1976. The Ötüken Neşriyat again republished the book in 2014 more faithful to the original Ottoman alphabet tone but again in modern Turkish alphabet, therefore retaining the publishing and popularity of the book.

== Chapters ==
1. Üç Cereyan (Three Movements)
2. Lisan (Language)
3. An'ane ve Kaid (Narratives and Belief)
4. Hars Zümresi, Medeniyet Zümresi (Party of Culture and Party of Civilisation)
5. Türklüğün Başına Gelenler (What Happened to Turkishness)
6. Terbiye (Discipline)
7. Mefkure (Ideal)
8. Türk Milleti ve Turan (Turkish Nation and Turan)
9. Millet ve Vatan (Nation and Land)
10. Milliyet Mefkuresi (Ideal of Nation)
11. Milliyet ve İslâmiye (Nationality and Islam)

== Ideological views ==
The book, as it reflects Ziya Gökalp's ideologies, both against Liberal individualism and Communism but supports the Solidarism as a solution for the Turkish nation. This proposal resembles Corporatism and it can be said that Romanticism and a desire to reconcile Islamism and Turkism has influenced the theme of book.

In chapter An'ane ve Kaid (Narratives and Belief) he openly criticizes both conservatives and radicals as in one party thinks the rules and beliefs are the ultimate truth while the latter is likened to "the English who are without rules" therefore suggesting a moderation between parties. In contrast in Türk Milleti ve Turan (Turkish people and Turan) he takes a more conservative stance, pointing out the "enemies of Turan" are Socialism, Defeatism and Schools and complains how "Germanisation, Francization and Russification" are dividing the Turkish nation, openly criticizing westernization and suggesting that "our land is neither Turkiye nor Turkistan, our land is eternal and bigger: Turan"

The book lays down the constitution of Gökalp's idea of Turkishness, which is the fact that he asserted that nation is a structure which is composed by belief and ideals, will be repeated in another work The Principles of Turkism hence he formed a unique idea of Turkism and Turkish nationalism. For the same reason, he is called "father of Turkish nationalism" by his followers.

== See also ==
- Nutuk
- Turkish–Islamic synthesis
- Nine Lights Doctrine
- Idealism (Turkey)
