= Aka Gündüz =

Turkish poet, composer and politician

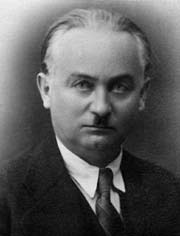

Background information
- Born: 1886; Selanik, Ottoman Empire
- Died: November 7, 1958 (aged 72)
- Genres: Ottoman classical music Turkish makam music
- Occupation: Composer

Aka Gündüz (1886 – 7 November 1958) was a Turkish poet, composer and politician. He is most notable for having composed the Ankara Marşı (Ankara March).

== Early life and education ==
Aka Gündüz was born as the son of the Major of the Ottoman Military Kadri Bey from Rize as Hüseyin Enis Avni, but during his life he was known with a variety of pen names such as Hüseyin Enis Avni, Ali Kemal, Enis Avni, Enis Saffet or Seniha Hikmet amongst others. Several years of his childhood he lived in the Balkans due to his fathers military duties. He attended primary school in Serres (in present day Greece) and Selanik (present day Thessaloniki). His education was directed at military career, therefore he studied at the Military junior high school of Selanik and after the Ottoman-Greek war of 1897, he moved to Istanbul and followed up on his studies at the Galatasaray high school, from where he also graduated. He got to know Ömer Seyfettin, (who would become one of the influential authors of Turkey), during classes at the special military school in Istanbul. He also attended the Ottoman Military academy but did not finish his studies there. He was only for a short time at the military, from which he was soon relieved from duties. He then tried to study law and fine arts in Paris, but also from those studies he wouldn't graduate and following he lived for some years in Selanik. He was exiled to his native Thessaloniki because of his involvement in political affairs during the reign of Abdul Hamid II.

== Professional career ==
He joined the revolutionary forces around the Army of Action during the counter-coup of 1909 and furtheron he established himself in Istanbul where he became an active writer for a variety of newspapers.

=== Political career ===
After the Occupation of Constantinople, Gündüz was briefly exiled to the island of Malta. With the establishment of the Turkish Republic, he embraced the Kemalist school of thought, and from 1932 to 1946 he was a Member of Parliament representing Ankara.

=== Literary career ===
In the 1900s, he began to write poems and later wrote for a variety of newspapers and magazines such as the Türk Yurdu, Sabah, Milliyet and Cumhuriyet amongst others. He was one of the contributors of the political magazine, İslam Mecmuası, from 1914 to 1918.
