= List of Turkish poets =

List of Turkish poets may refer to:

- List of Ottoman poets
- List of contemporary Turkish poets
