= Hürriyet (disambiguation) =

Hürriyet (Turkish for liberty) may refer to:

== People ==
- Hürriyet (name), list of people with the name

== Places ==
- Hürriyet, Fındıklı, district in Rize, Turkey
- Hürriyet Island, island located in Muğla Province, Turkey
- Hürriyet, Karacabey, village in the Karacabey district of Bursa Province

== Publications ==
- Hürriyet, Turkish newspaper founded in 1948
- Hürriyet Daily News, Turkish newspaper published in English language, founded in 1961

== Other uses ==
- Hürriyet ve İtilâf Fırkası, political party in the Ottoman Empire
- Vatan ve Hürriyet, secret revolutionary society opposed to Ottoman Sultan Abdul Hamid II
