= Harp Mecmuası =

Military journal in the Ottoman Empire (1915-1918)

- Categories: Military journal
- Frequency: Biweekly; Irregular
- Publisher: Ottoman Ministry of War
- Founded: 1915
- First issue: November 1915
- Final issue: June 1918
- Country: Ottoman Empire
- Based in: Istanbul
- Language: Ottoman Turkish

Harp Mecmuası (Ottoman Turkish: War Journal) was an Ottoman illustrated military journal published in Istanbul from 1915 to 1918. It was started during the Gallipoli campaign between the Ottoman army and the Allied coalition led by the United Kingdom. It was the most popular publication in the Ottoman Empire during World War I.

== History and profile ==
Harp Mecmuası was first published by the Ministry of War in Istanbul as a biweekly in November 1915. It was launched as a response to the British propaganda and contained frequent pro-German materials. The Ottoman army was fighting in Gallipoli when the journal was started. Given that all articles were written in Ottoman Turkish, its primary target was Turkish people living in the Empire. Its goal was to present military news to raise their awareness about the achievements of the Ottoman army and to make them having an understanding of why the Ottoman Empire participated in World War I.

Harp Mecmuası frequently published news from the fronts of World War I. It also provided detailed information on history, ethnography and geography of the various parts of the Empire, including Palestine, Jerusalem and the Suez Canal. The journal was assisted by the Intelligence Office under the General Staff in producing these articles which were mostly accompanied by drawings and photographs. One of these photographs was that of Seyit Ali Çabuk (known as Corporal Seyit) who was an Ottoman soldier, and it was published in the cover page of the second issue of the journal dated December 1915. In the photograph Corporal Seyit was shown carrying a 275 kg heavy shell to the gun. It made Corporal Seyit legend being the symbol of the victory of the Ottoman Navy at the Dardanelles on 18 March 1915. Other leading Ottoman military figures of the fight in Gallipoli were also covered in the articles, including Captain Mehmet Hilmi and Lieutenant Fahri from the Rumeli Mecidiye battery. The journal featured aerial photographs of the Suez Canal which were employed by the Ottoman fighter pilots in their attacks against the British Navy in the region.

The names of the editors were not given in the masthead of Harp Mecmuası. One of its major contributors was Ziya Gökalp. Over time the frequency of Harb Mecmuası became irregular, and it folded in June 1918 due to economical reasons after producing the issue numbered 27.
