= Turkic literature =

Turkic literature refers to the literature in any of the Turkic languages:

- Azerbaijani literature
- Bashkir literature
- Kazakh literature
- Kyrgyz literature
- Tatar literature
- Turkish literature
- Turkmen literature
- Uyghur literature
- Uzbek literature
