= İslam Mecmuası =

Political magazine in Ottoman Empire (1914–1918)

- Editor: Kazanlı Halim Sabit
- Categories: Political magazine
- Frequency: Biweekly
- Founded: 1914
- First issue: 12 February 1914
- Final issue: 30 October 1918
- Country: Ottoman Empire
- Based in: Constantinople
- Language: Ottoman Turkish

İslam Mecmuası (Turkish: Journal of Islam) was a biweekly political magazine which was published in Constantinople, Ottoman Empire, between 1914 and 1918. It is known as being one of the early publications which attempted to provide a synthesis of nationalism and Islamism, and its motto was dinli bir hayat, hayatlı bir din (Turkish: A life with religion, a religion with life). It was sponsored by the Committee of Union and Progress.

== History and profile ==
İslam Mecmuası was established in 1914 and financed by the Committee of Union and Progress. Its first issue was published on 12 February 1914. Kazanlı Halim Sabit served as its editor. The magazine came out biweekly and was headquartered in Constantinople. İslam Mecmuası had thirty-two pages in the beginning, but then was reduced to sixteen pages due to paper shortage during World War I. It was printed by different publishing houses throughout its existence.

The magazine aimed at producing a synthesis of nationalism and Islamism and at presenting a reformist and liberal version of Islam which would be much more compatible with modern lifestyles. Unlike other Islamist publications it focused on the social roles and functions of Islam. İslam Mecmuası published the announcement of jihad in November 1914. It ceased publication on 30 October 1918 after producing a total of sixty-three issues.

=== Contributors ===
Notable contributors of İslam Mecmuası included Ahmet Ağaoğlu, Besim Atalay, Aka Gündüz and Ömer Seyfettin. They were from three different groups: ulemas such as Shaykh al-Islām Musa Kazım Efendi, İzmirli İsmail Hakkı and Şerafeddin Yaltıkaya, Islamic reformers such as Şemsettin Günaltay and Halim Sabit, and pan-Turkists such as Ziya Gökalp and Mehmet Fuat Köprülü.

Contributors of İslam Mecmuası often confronted the conservative Islamists whose media outlet was Sebilürreşad journal. The debates were mostly about the reform in Islam and began just after the publication of Ziya Gökalp's article entitled Fıkıh ve İçtimaiyat (Ottoman Turkish: Fiqh and Sociology) in İslam Mecmuası. The tensions between the two camps increased in 1915 when İslam Mecmuası openly supported the restrictions on the authority of the Shaykh al-Islām.

İslam Mecmuası was the first publication in the Empire which introduced the views of Ibn Taymiyyah, a Salafi thinker, through the articles of Şerafeddin Yaltıkaya.
