= Görele =

- Municipality
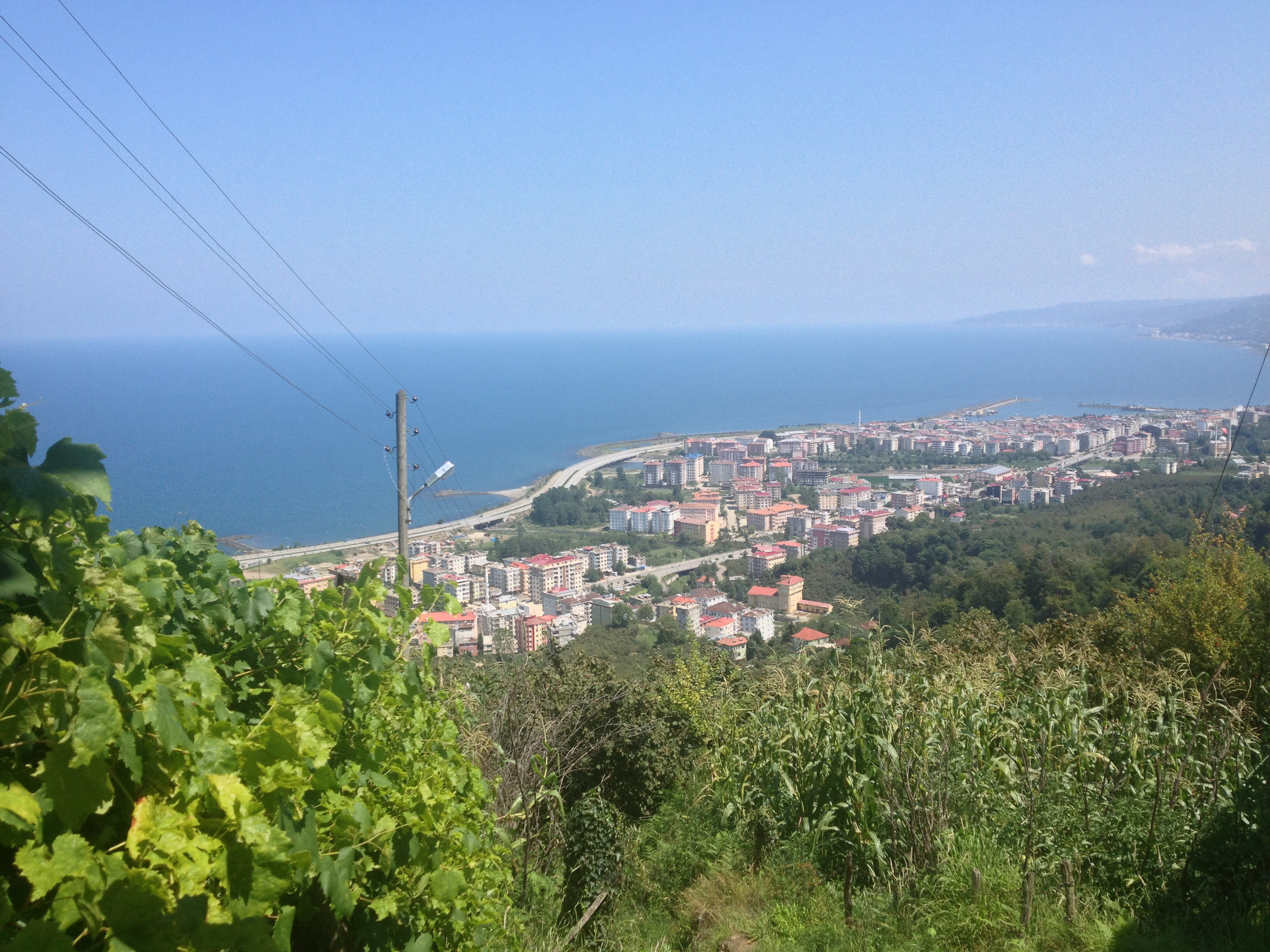

- Logo

- Location within Turkey
- Coordinates: 41°02′N 39°00′E
- Country: Turkey
- Province: Giresun
- District: Görele

Government
  - Mayor: Hasbi Dede (CHP)
- Elevation: 50 m (160 ft)
- Population (2022): 18,725
- Time zone: UTC+3 (TRT)
- Postal code: 28800
- Area code: 0454
- Climate: Cfa
- Website: www.gorele.bel.tr

Görele is a town in Giresun Province on the Black Sea coast of eastern Turkey. It is the seat of Görele District. Its population is 18,725 (2022).

== Geography ==
Görele is a large town on the Black Sea coast. The Black Sea coast highway from Giresun to Trabzon runs through here and Görele is about halfway between the two cities, 70 km from each. There is no real port at Görele so goods and people all come though this coast road, but there is a small fishing fleet. The main industry is hazelnut processing, and in August the whole area is busy with people harvesting hazelnuts and bringing them into town.

Görele has its own kemençe style and tradition. Famous Görelean kemençe players include Halil Ağa, Picoğlu Osman and Katip Şadi.

== History ==
The name is derived from the ancient city of Coralla, though that Pontic settlement was probably sited nearer to today's Eynesil.

Much later there was a Genoese trading post here and the ruins of their castle is 20 km east of the town of Görele today. Chepni Turks arrived in Görele from Khorasan in the early years of the 13/14th century.

As the castle of Kordyle, this was one of the last Christian outposts to fall to Sultan Mehmet II after he conquered the Empire of Trebizond in 1461. According to Pontic ballads, it was defended against the Sultan's soldiers by a peasant girl until she took her life by throwing herself from a window. According to William Miller, the window could still be seen up until the Crimean War.

From 1878 to 1922, it was a part of Ottoman Trebizond Vilayet. During the republican era, it became a part of newly founded Giresun province.

Görele, like the rest of this coast was occupied by Russian troops for two years during the First World War.

== Sport ==
The women's handball team Görele Bld. SK play in the Turkish Women's Handball Super League.

== Prominent natives/residents ==
- Katip Şadi, kemençe player
- Tuzcuoğlu Mehmet Ali, kemenche player
- Picoğlu Osman (1901–1946) famous kemençe player
- Hasan Ali Yücel poet and politician, former minister of education, and his son the poet Can Yücel
- Hamit Görele, artist and thinker
- Bedri Rahmi Eyüboğlu artist and poet
- Fatih Kırtorun, poet
- Salim PATAN, poet, writer and teacher
- Kemal Yayla, Police Commissioner
- Kemal Gürses, conductor and composer

== See also ==
- Mount Sis
- Picoğlu Osman
- Kemenche
- Katip Şadi
