= Ali Canip Yöntem =

Turkish writer (1887–1967)

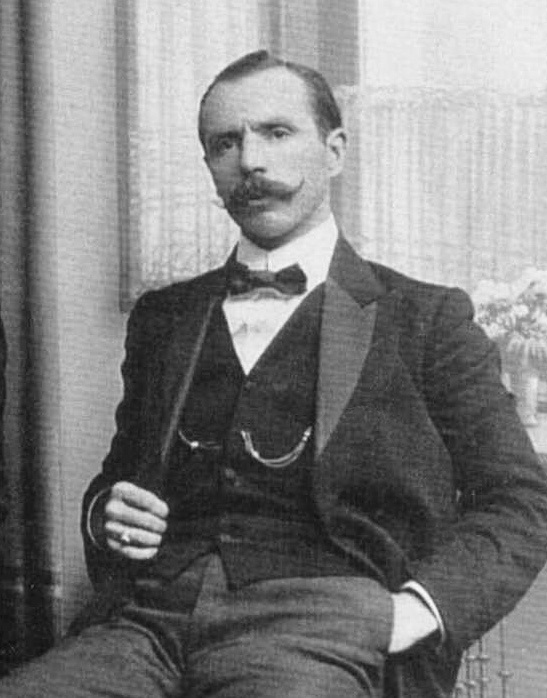
- Born: 1887; Istanbul, Ottoman Empire
- Died: October 26, 1967 (aged 80); Istanbul, Turkey
- Education: Istanbul University, Thessaloniki Law School
- Occupations: Teacher, writer, Deputy

Ali Canip Yöntem (born 1887 Istanbul – October 26, 1967, Istanbul), was a Turkish poet, writer, literary history researcher, and politician.

== Biography ==
He was born in 1887 in Istanbul. His father was Halil Saip, a member of the Ministry of Evkaf, and his mother was Hafize Nuriye, the daughter of Anapa mufti İslam. Most of his grandfathers were from Kanlıca and had worked in foundations.

He studied in Istanbul, first at Üsküdar Gülfem School, then at Toptaşı Military High School and two years at the French school in Selamsız. After his father was exiled to Thessaloniki, he continued his education at the Thessaloniki Mulkiye High School. The Turkish and literature lessons he took from Cudi Efendi at this school made him interested in literature. The poet he read most during high school was Muallim Naci. In 1906, when he was in the last year of his high school, he enrolled in Istanbul Law School with an examination, but later had his enrollment in Thessaloniki Law School. He was a graduate of Thessaloniki Law School.

== Professional career ==
"İttihat and Terakki" School and Agricultural Mekteb-i Âlisi Teaching, Çanakkale Sultanî Literature and Philosophy Teaching, İstanbul Gelenbevi Sultan's Teaching, Daru'l-Muallimîni High School Teacher, Trabzon Sultanî Directorate, Giresun Education Directorate, Education Inspectorate, Darûn Literature Branch Turkish literature History Teacher, Istanbul Male Teacher's School, Kabataş High School Teaching, Istanbul Libraries Classification Committee, Member of History Committee, Ministry of Education General Inspectorship, Member of Turkish Historical Society, Istanbul University Faculty of Letters, 17th century. TBMM IV. Term (by-election), V. and VI. Period Army, IX. He was a Bursa Deputy for the period.

== Bibliography ==
Ali Canip, who started his literary career with poetry, published his poems written in syllabic meter and in a plain language in Yeni Mecmua in 1917–1918. His only poetry book is called "The Way I Passed (Turkish: Geçtiğim Yol)" (1918).

He served National Literature with his theoretical and polemical articles in Genç Kalemler magazine as well as with his poems. In fact, Ali Canip was one of the founders of Genç Kalemler. Although he quit poetry after a while, he continued his theoretical writings until the end of his life. Bağçe, Kadın, Yeni Kalemler, Hayat Mecmuası, Yeni Mecmua, Turkiyat Institute Journal and Recent History Journal are among the publications where he published his works. He collected his articles in the book titled National Literature Issue and My Discussions with Cenap Bey (1918).

Ömer Seyfettin with Epope (1927, 1963); His Life and Works (1935) are his other two important books.
