= Picoğlu Osman =

Turkish musician (1901–1946)

- Picoğlu Osman

Background information
- Also known as: Piçoğlu Osman, Osman Bicioğlu, Bicoğlu, Piç Oğlu Osman
- Born: Osman Gökçe; 1901 (Note: It is not exactly known which day he was born. Also, some sources even claim that he was not born in 1901 but 1899. But it has never been proven. Ottoman sources claim he was born in the Rumi year of 1316); Daylı, Kaza of Görele, Sandjak of Trabzon, Trabzon Vilayet, Ottoman Empire (today; Görele, Giresun province, Turkey)
- Origin: Görele, Turkey
- Died: 31 May 1946 (aged 44) Black Sea Coast, Turkey
- Genres: Kemençe of the Black Sea
- Occupation: Kemençe player
- Years active: 1910–1946

Picoğlu Osman (Turkish: [piˈdʒoːɫu ˈosman], 1901 – 31 May 1946) was a Turkish kemençe player and composer from the Eastern Black Sea Region in Turkey.

== Early life ==
Osman was born in Görele, Northeastern Turkey. His father's name was İsmail and his mother's name was Esma. His mother died in 1905 and his father died in 1912. In 1910, at the age of 9, he began playing kemençe, taught by Kodalak Halil Agha. He attended traditional festivals and weddings and performed famous kemençe türküs.

== Osman as a virtuoso ==
Osman was thought to be a very talented player because of his style of play. He worked at TRT Radio in Ankara for four months. He recorded songs on 78 rpm vinyls. His records include:

- "Gireson Eşref bey şarkısı"
- "Trabzon Kahya Şarkısı"
- "Gireson karşılaması (Karşılama)"
- "Trabzon Şarkısı (Fadime)"
- "Geminin İçineyum"
- "Romiko" (Gireson Milli Şarkısı)
- "Tamzara Havası"
- "Trabzon Sıksara Horon Havası"
- "Giresun Üstünde Vapur Bağırıyor"
- "Anlamıyorsun Beni" or (TRT: "Anam vay olsun beni")

During Mustafa Kemal Atatürk's visit to Trabzon, Picoğlu played kemençe in front of the president.

He influenced a lot of kemençe players such as Mehmet Sırrı Öztürk.

== Death ==
He was on board of a ship which sailed to Istanbul when he died. His cause of death is not known, but it is thought to be tuberculosis or cirrhosis.

== Photos ==
Picoğlu Osman

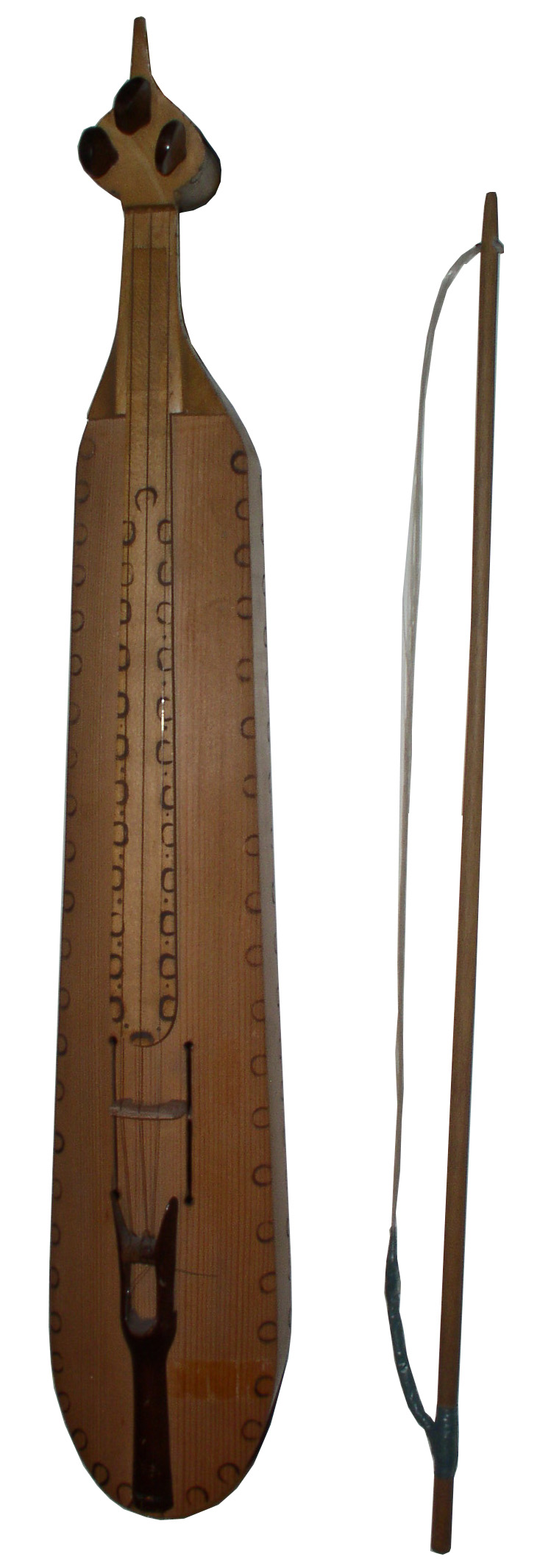
Turkish kemenche
