= Fatih Kırtorun =

Turkish poet and translator (born 1985)

- Born: 30 March 1985 Giresun, Turkey
- Occupation: Poet, translator

Fatih Kırtorun (born March 30, 1985) is a Turkish poet and translator.

== Personal life ==
Born in Görele, Giresun, Turkey, he moved to Istanbul where he attended primary and high school. He studied English language and literature.

== Poetry ==
He published his poem "Yitik Sayfalar Bilmecesi" (Lost Pages' Puzzle) in Varlık in 2006. He wrote a poem devoted to Bilge Karasu named "Öldürsen (G)e(ce)" (Night Tale) in Sözcükler. He took part in the Contemporary Turkish Language Magazine with his poem "Gölgesizlik". (Shadowless) He penned poems in Koridor Literary Magazine. He also publishes works in several literary magazines and reviews.

== Short stories ==
One of his early works a short story was translated into Greek at Democritus University of Thrace and also used as a text material in a dissertation at the same university.
