= List of Ottoman poets =

This is a list of poets who wrote under the auspices of the Ottoman Empire, or — more broadly — who wrote in the tradition of Ottoman Dîvân poetry.

== Male poets ==
- Abdullah Bosnevi (1584-1644)
- Bâkî (باقى) (1526–1600)
- Fuzûlî (فضولی) (c. 1483 – 1556)
- Hayâlî (خيالى) (c. 1500 – 1557)
- Nedîm (نديم) (c. 1681 – 1730)
- Nef'i (1572–1635)
- Nesîmî (نسيمى) (died c. 1417)
- Neşâtî (نشاطى) (died 1674)
- Rewani (1475-1524)
- Şeyyad Ḥamza (thirteenth-century)

== Female poets ==
- Adile Sultan (1826-1899)
- Fitnat Hanım (1725-1780)
- Mihri Hatun (مھری خاتون) (died 1506)
- Hubbi Hatun (حبی خاتون) (died 1590)
- Leyla Saz (1850-1936)
- Nigâr Hanım (1856-1918)
- Umihana Čuvidina (c.1794 - c.1870)

== See also ==
- List of contemporary Turkish poets
