= Ömer Seyfettin =

Turkish Writer of early 20th Century

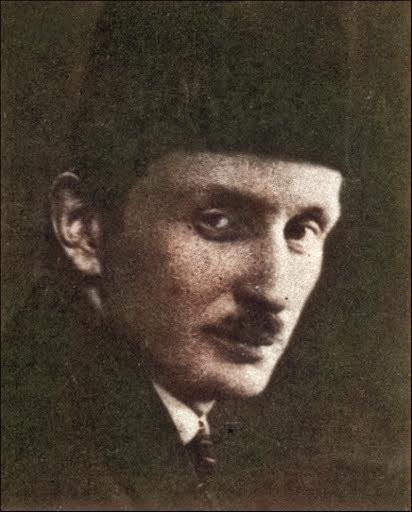
- Ömer Seyfettin
- Born: March 11, 1884; Gönen, Balıkesir Province, Ottoman Empire
- Died: March 6, 1920 (aged 35); Constantinople, Ottoman Empire
- Occupations: Author, teacher, military officer

Ömer Seyfettin (11 March 1884, Gönen – 6 March 1920, Istanbul), was a Turkish writer from the late 19th to early 20th century, considered to be one of the greatest modern Turkish authors. His work is much praised for simplifying the Turkish language from the Persian and Arabic words and phrases that were common at the time.

== Biography ==
Ömer Seyfettin was born in Gönen, a town in Balıkesir Province, in 1884. The son of a military official, he spent his early life travelling around the coast of Marmara Sea. He also began a military career and graduated from the Military Academy (Harp Okulu) in 1903. He was assigned as a Lieutenant and posted to the Western Border units of the Ottoman Empire Army, including Kuşadası. It was in İzmir where he became familiar with writing. In 1909, he served as an officer of the Hareket Ordusu (Action Army) which suppressed the Istanbul Irtica uprising, the religious groups opposing the newly formed constitutional monarchy in Istanbul. Promoted to First Lieutenant, Seyfettin was posted as an instructor in a military school in İzmir. This position was an opportunity for Seyfettin to improve his French and interact with like-minded writers.

In 1911, Ömer Seyfettin cofounded a literary and cultural magazine entitled Genç Kalemler (Young Pens) with Ziya Gokalp and Ali Canip in Salonica. He was also close friends with Baha Tevfik. Seyfettin began the early efforts in using colloquial Turkish in his literary output as opposed to Ottoman Turkish, as he outlined to Ali Canip in a letter. He was recalled to the army under mobilization orders at the beginning of the Balkan War and after his units were defeated in Yanina in January 1913, he spent approximately 12 months in Greece as a prisoner of war. After his release from captivity at the end of 1913, he returned to Constantinople, and was nominated the executive editor of the Türk Sözü, a publication which was associated with the ruling Committee for Union and Progress. In 1914, after leaving the army for the second time, Ömer Seyfettin became a literature teacher in an Istanbul high school. The same year, he also became the chief author (başyazar) of the magazine Türk Yurdu. Between the years 1914 and 1917 he mainly wrote turanist poems, which were published in outlets such as Tanin, Türk Yurdu or Halka Doğru. In 1917 he published most of his literary work, which included a wide array of short stories. From 1919 to 1920 he published articles in Büyük Mecmua, which was a supporter of the Turkish Independence War. He died of diabetes in 1920, at the age of 36.

== Novels ==
- Ashâb-ı Kehfimiz (1918)
- Efruz Bey (1919)
- Yalnız Efe (1919)
- Kaşağı (1919)
- Yarınki Turan Devleti

== Short story collections ==
- Toplu Hikayeleri, Cilt I & Cilt II (1902-1911)
- Harem (1918)
- Yüksek Ökçeler (1922)
- Gizli Mabed (1923)
- Beyaz Lale (1938)
- Asilzâdeler (1938)
- İlk Düşen Ak (1938)
- Mahçupluk İmtihanı (1938)
- Dalga (1943)
- Nokta (1956)
- Tarih Ezelî Bir Tekerrürdür (1958)

=== Poetry collections ===
- Ömer Seyfettin’in Şiirleri (Poems written by Ömer Seyfettin, 1972)

== See also ==
- Turkish literature
