= Rewani =

Rewani (c. 1475 – 1524), Ilyas Shudja Celebi, was an Ottoman poet. Born in Edirne the son of 'Abd Allah, he was employed by Bayezid II as administrator of the surre; money for the poor in the holy cities of Mecca and Medina. After being accused of embezzling, he was promptly dismissed. He found service with Prince Selim, Bayezid's son, in Trabzon Province. Yet again, he fell into disfavor through some indiscretion, but was forgiven by Prince Selim. Following Selim's overthrow of Bayezid II, Rewani became superintendent of the kitchen(matbakh emini) and later entrusted with the administration of the Hagia Sophia. Yet, during his lifetime, Rewani was accused of peculation and plagiarism.

Rewani built a mosque complex in the Kırk Çeşme quarter of Constantinople and was buried there in 1524. The mosque complex no longer exists.

Rewani suffered from an affliction to his eyes and in the words of a hostile contemporary poet, "a just punishment of God". Rewani's response was, "he who has honey licks his fingers".

== Work ==
Rewani dedicated his Diwan to Selim I. The strength of this Diwan originates in its ghazels, which sing in a gentle flowing manner of human and mystic love, most of which were later set to music.

Rewani's magnum opus is the Ishret-name, a masnavi consisting of 694 beyts, which was finished near the end of his life. The Ishret-name gives a history of viniculture and Rewani goes into great detail concerning wine-drinking including the etiquette and the meals served. As a precaution, he gives the story a mystical setting to avoid attacks from the devout. However, the story indicates the existence of such activities during his lifetime and his preference for such things and was praised for its wit, which was graceful and elegant. Rewani's Ishret-name was the first Ottoman Turkish poem with a bacchic theme, which inspired the saki-names genre that became popular a century later.
