= Genç Kalemler =

Ottoman literary and cultural magazine (1911–1912)

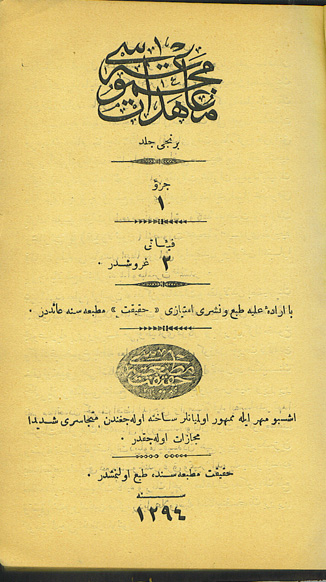
- Cover of Genç Kalemler
- Categories: Literary magazine; Cultural magazine; Political magazine
- Founder: Ziya Gökalp; Ömer Seyfettin; Ali Canip Yöntem
- Founded: 1911
- First issue: 11 April 1911
- Final issue: 1912
- Country: Ottoman Empire
- Based in: Thessaloniki
- Language: Ottoman Turkish

Genç Kalemler (Ottoman Turkish: Young Pens) was an Ottoman literary and cultural magazine which was one of the earliest nationalist publications in the Ottoman Empire. Murat Belge describes it as a pan-Turkist publication. It was published between April 1911 and October 1912 in Thessaloniki, Ottoman Empire, and was the first Ottoman publication which called for having a national language.

== History and profile ==
Genç Kalemler was first published on 11 April 1911 as a successor of Hüsn ve Şiir, a literary and sociology magazine which was published in Thessaloniki in 1910. Its editor-in-chief was Nesimi Sarım who was the secretary of the Central Council of the Committee of Union and Progress (CUP). The founders of Genç Kalemler were the members of a national literary movement: Ziya Gökalp, Ömer Seyfettin and Ali Canip Yöntem. The magazine was financially and politically backed by the CUP.

The major tenet of the magazine was to implement the language reform to simplify the Ottoman language to improve the literacy rates and to avoid the dissolution of the Ottoman Empire. It supported the use of pure Turkish and employed vernacular Turkish instead of the Ottoman Turkish. Another major view of the magazine contributors was that the Ottoman Turkish could not be a national language due to its artificial nature and that Istanbul Turkish should be adopted as the official language of the Empire. To this end the editors of Genç Kalemler reviewed the literary works written in Ottoman Turkish arguing that these works could not reflect the eminence of the Turkish nation.

Ziya Gökalp's poem entitled Turan was first published in the magazine. Gökalp's another significant contribution in the magazine was his article about the philosophical approach of Henri Bergson which was the first writing on Bergson in an Ottoman publication. Mehmet Ali Tevfik and Hakkı Süha published poems in the magazine developing analogies between the forces of Genghis and Attila and the Ottoman soldiers fighting against the Italian Empire in the Italo-Turkish War in Libya.

Genç Kalemler published a total of thirty-three issues before ceasing publication in October 1912.
