= Hürriyet (name) =

Hürriyet (Turkish: Liberty) is a unisex given name of Arabic origin used in Turkey among Turks and Kurds. It is also used as a surname. Notable people with the name include:

== Given name ==
- Hürriyet Gücer (born 1981), Turkish footballer
- Hürriyet Sırmaçek (1912–1983), Turkish engineer

== Surname ==
- Fatma Kaplan Hürriyet (born 1982), Turkish lawyer and politician

== See also ==
- Hürriyet (disambiguation)
