= Hayat (magazine) =

Discontinued literary magazine in Turkey

- Editor: Mehmet Emin, Nâfi Atuf and Fâruk Nâfiz
- Categories: Science, Philosophy and Arts
- Frequency: weekly
- Founded: 1926
- Final issue: 1929
- Based in: Ankara; Istanbul
- Language: Ottoman Turkish
- Website: Hayāt

Hayat (Ottoman Turkish: حيات, lit. 'Life') was an Ottoman Turkish language weekly magazine published in Ankara and Istanbul between 1926 and 1929 in a total of 146 issues. For the first 75 issues Mehmet Emin Erişirgil was the editor-in-chief, then Nâfî Atuf Kansu and Faruk Nafız Çamlıbel assumed the office. The magazine described itself as "literary opinion magazine".

The content of the magazine was particularly addressed to writers and philosophers and intended to encourage intellectuals to write innovatively. It also included a special edition for women.

In addition to numerous articles, poems, stories, essays, reviews and biographies, various visual materials, photographs and illustrations of political, intellectual and literary personalities, art works and public events were further edited. Well-known authors, like Köprülüzade Mehmet Fuat, Fazıl Ahmet, Sevket Rado, Mustafa Şekip Tunç, Mehmet İzzet, Ahmet Refik and Necmettin Sadık, publicized their articles.

The themes were varied and aimed at arousing the readers' interest in various ways, as the main article in the first issue emphasizes. The spectrum ranged from political topics such as nationalism, reformism, progress, modernization, nationalization and economic development to art and science. In general, the magazine supported the legitimacy of the new government. For example, an article of 1929 promoting Mustafa Kemal shows its connection to the ideology of the new Turkish Republic.

The adoption of the Latin alphabet instead of the Arabic alphabet began with the 90th issue in August 1928 and ended with the full use of Latin letters finally being introduced in the 95th issue in September 1928.

Subscriptions to the journal were available both inside and outside the country.
