= Ziya Gökalp =

Turkish writer and journalist (1876–1924)

Mehmet Ziya Gökalp
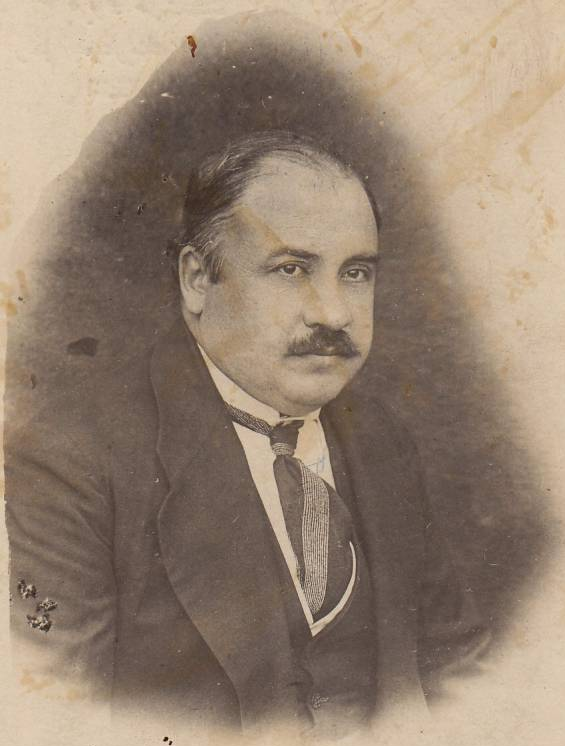
- Born: Mehmed Ziya; 23 March 1876; Diyarbakır, Ottoman Empire
- Died: 25 October 1924 (aged 48); Istanbul, Turkey
- Resting place: Çemberlitaş, Fatih, Istanbul
- Education: Veterinary school

Mehmet Ziya Gökalp (born Mehmed Ziya, 23 March 1876 – 25 October 1924) was a Turkish proto-fascist sociologist, writer, poet, and politician, considered the father of Turkish nationalism and the chief ideologist of Mustafa Kemal Atatürk. After the 1908 Young Turk Revolution that reinstated constitutionalism in the Ottoman Empire, he adopted the pen name Gökalp ("celestial hero"), which he retained for the rest of his life. As a sociologist, Ziya Gökalp was influential in the negation of Islamism, pan-Islamism, and Ottomanism as ideological, cultural, and sociological identifiers. In a 1936 publication, sociologist Niyazi Berkes described Gökalp as "the real founder of Turkish sociology, since he was not a mere translator or interpreter of foreign sociology".

Gökalp's work was Talaat Pasha's and the CUP's chief ideologist, being also particularly influential in shaping the reforms of Mustafa Kemal Atatürk; his influence figured prominently in the development of Kemalism, and its legacy in the modern Republic of Turkey. Influenced by contemporary European thought, particularly by the sociological view of Émile Durkheim, Gökalp rejected both the Ottomanism and Islamism in favor of Turkish nationalism. He advocated a Turkification of the Ottoman Empire, by promoting Turkish language and culture to all Ottoman citizenry. He considered Greeks, Armenians, Assyrians and Jews to be an undesirable foreign body in the national Turkish state. His thought, which popularized Pan-Turkism and Turanism, has been described as a "cult of nationalism and modernization". His nationalist ideals espoused a de-identification with Ottoman Turkey's nearby Arab neighbors, instead advocating for a supra-national Turkish (or pan-Turkic) identity with "a territorial Northeast-orientation [to] Turkic peoples".

== Early life ==
Mehmed Ziya was born in Diyarbakır of the Ottoman Empire on 23 March 1876 to Muhammad Tefvik Bey and Zeliha Hanım. He was the second son of the family. He, specifically his maternal family, was of Kurdish origin. Ziya described his paternal family as Syrian Turkmen, but Rohat Alakom identifies his father as belonging to the Kurds of Çermik instead. Either way, Ziya concealed traces of his Kurdish ancestry and never mentioned his mother's origins.

His father was an Ottoman bureaucrat and responsible for publishing the Salname of Diyarbakır. He had a close relationship with his uncle, who would have liked to have seen Ziya marry his daughter. His uncle was religious and opposed Ziya's interactions with Abdullah Cevdet, who was an atheist. Diyarbakır was a "cultural frontier", having been ruled by Arabs and Persians until the 16th century, and featuring "conflicting national traditions" among the local populations of Turks, Kurds, and Armenians. This cultural environment has often been suggested to have informed his sense of national identity; later in his life, when political detractors suggested that he was of Kurdish extraction, Gökalp responded that while he was certain of patrilineal Turkish racial heritage, this was insignificant: "I learned through my sociological studies that nationality is based solely on upbringing."

Gökalp attempted suicide in early 1895 after an existential crisis caused by his discovery of materialism. Cevdet, who was a doctor, rescued him, which he would lament later as Gökalp became a Turkist ideologue. After attending primary and secondary education in Diyarbakır, he settled in Istanbul, in 1895. There, he attended veterinary school and became involved in underground revolutionary nationalist politics for which he served ten months in prison. He developed relationships with many figures of the revolutionary underground in this period, abandoned his veterinary studies, and became a member of the underground revolutionary group, the Committee of Union and Progress (CUP).

== Career ==
The revolutionary currents of Constantinople at the time were extremely varied; the unpopularity of the Abdul Hamid II regime had by this time awakened diverse revolutionary sentiment in Constantinople. He inaugurated the first CUP office in Diyarbakır in July 1908. In September 1909 he moved to Selanik, where he became a member of the CUP Central Committee in 1910. There he cofounded a literary and cultural journal, Genç Kalemler. While residing in Salonika, Talaat Pasha was often a guest in his house, where they delved into political discussions. Historian Hans-Lukas Kieser describes Talaat and Gökalp as a political duumvirate, with Talaat as the CUP's executive leader and Gökalp as its chief ideologue. It was also during his stay in Selanik that he began using the penname Gökalp and his future role within the CUP was to be determined. In 1912, he moved back to Constantinople, as did the CUP. Gökalp was one of the regular contributors of the political magazine İslam Mecmuası from 1914 to 1918 and the military journal Harp Mecmuası between 1915 and 1918.

After World War I, he was arrested for his involvement in the Committee of Union and Progress and exiled to Malta for two years between 1919 and 1921.

While exiled on Malta, he continued to write and consolidate his ideas and drafted his Principles of Turkism, published in 1923. He returned to Turkey in the spring of 1921, but was not given back his chair at the University of Istanbul. He settled in his hometown of Diyarbakır where he taught sociology and psychology at a secondary school and teacher's seminary. He began publishing a small weekly newsletter, Küçük Mecmua, which slowly became influential and led to contributions in the major daily newspapers of Istanbul and Ankara. During the Lausanne Conference of 1922–1923, Gökalp lived and worked in Ankara as a supporter of Mustafa Kemal. At the end of 1922, Gökalp was invited to direct the department of publication and translation at the Ministry of Education. He was selected to serve as a member of the Grand National Assembly of Turkey until his death in 1924, and he served on the Committee for Education which reformed the school system, curriculum and textbooks according to his guidance. He emphasized that the education provided should include Turkism, Modernism and Islamism. Besides Turkish culture and language, he advocated for the inclusion of Persian and Arabic language, the Quran and mathematics, physics and some European languages in the curriculum.

Gökalp was the owner of land which included 5 villages in the northeast of Diyarbakır.

== Personal life and death ==
Ziya Gökalp was married, and his daughter was named Hürriyet as a reference to the revolution of the Committee of Union and Progress in 1908. He died on 25 October 1924 in Istanbul, where he went to rest after a short illness, aged 48.

== Ideology ==
Gökalp's work, in the context of the decline of the Ottoman Empire, was instrumental in the development of Turkish national identity, which he himself referred to even then as Turkishness. He believed that a nation must have a "shared consciousness" in order to survive, that "the individual becomes a genuine personality only as he becomes a genuine representative of his culture". He believed that a modern state must become homogeneous in terms of culture, religion, and national identity. This conception of national identity was augmented by his belief in the primacy of Turkishness, as a unifying virtue. In a 1911 article, he suggested that "Turks are the 'supermen' imagined by the German philosopher Nietzsche".

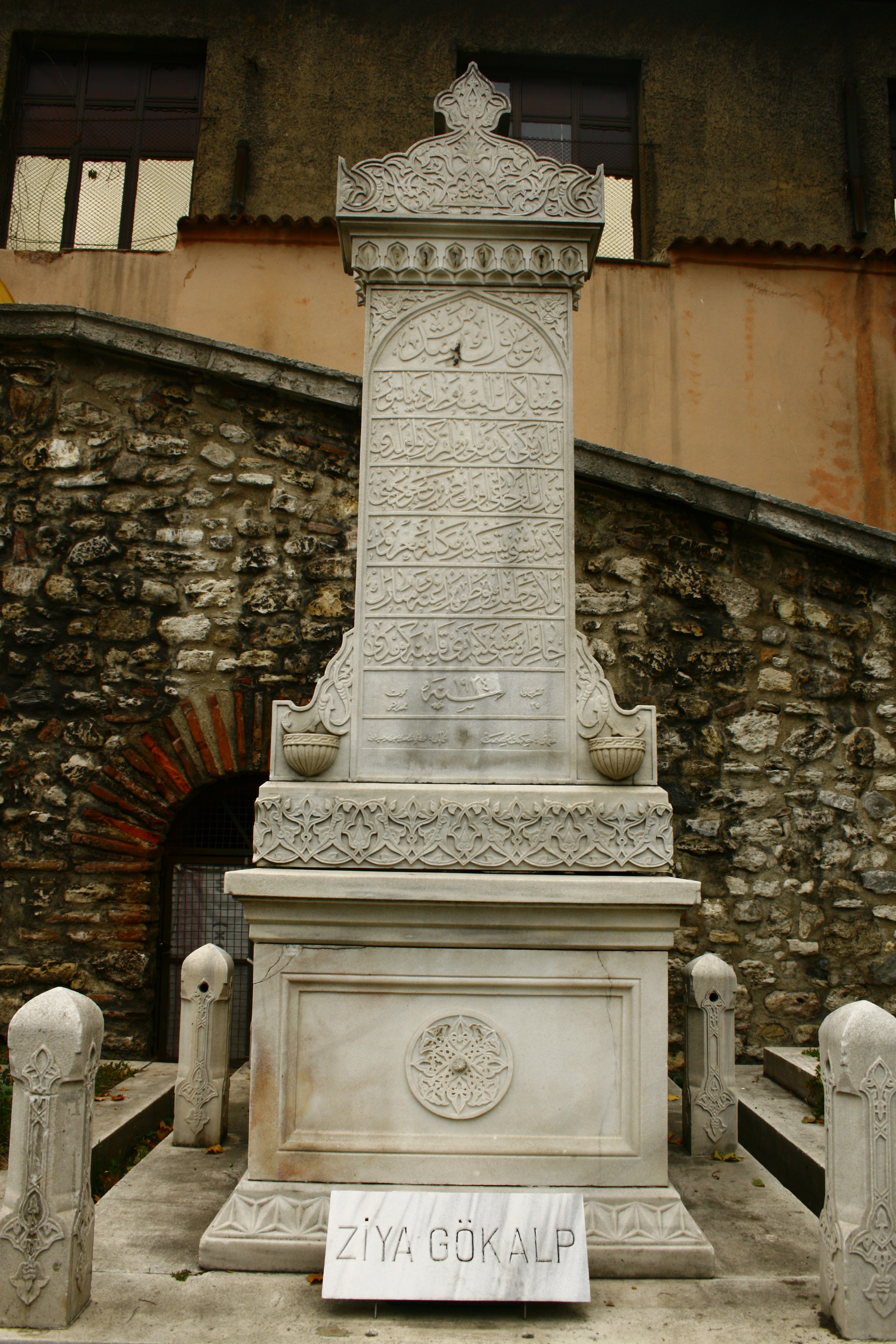
The grave of Gökalp in Istanbul

His major sociological work was interested in differentiating Avrupalılık ("Europeanism", the mimicking of Western societies) and Modernlik ("Modernity", taking initiative); he was interested in Japan as a model in this, for what he perceived to be its having modernized without abandoning its innate cultural identity. Gökalp suggested that to subordinate "culture" (non-utilitarianism, altruism, public-spiritedness) to "civilization" (utilitarianism, egoism, individualism) was to doom a state to decline: "civilization destroyed societal solidarity and morality".

Informed by his reading of Émile Durkheim, Gökalp concluded that Western liberalism, as a social system, was inferior to solidarism, because liberalism encouraged individualism, which in turn diminished the integrity of the state. Durkheim, whose work Gökalp himself translated into Turkish, perceived religion as a means of unifying a population socially, and even "religion as society's worship of itself". Durkheim's assertion that the life of the group was more important than the life of the individual, this was a concept readily adopted by Gökalp. A well-known newspaper columnist and political figure, Gökalp was a primary ideologue of the Committee of Union and Progress. His views of "nation", and the ways in which they have informed the development of the modern Turkish state, have made for a controversial legacy. Many historians and sociologists have suggested that his brand of nationalism contributed to the Armenian genocide. His conception of nation was of a "social solidarity" that necessitated "cultural unity". "Geographic nationalism", in which everyone living under one political system was a part of the nation, was unacceptable to Gökalp, who conceived of a nation as linguistically and culturally unified. Finally, merely to believe one was a part of a nation, this was not enough, either; one cannot choose to belong to the nation, in his view, as membership in the nation is involuntary. Kieser characterizes Gökalp's thought as a form of proto-fascism, citing his advocacy of a supreme leader, an army-like social hierarchy, and ethno-religious exclusion.

=== The Principles of Turkism ===
His 1923 The Principles of Turkism, published just a year prior to his death, outlines the expansive nationalist identity he had long popularized in his teachings and poetry. The nationalism he espouses entails "a nation [that] is not a racial or ethnic or geographic or political or volitional group but one composed of individuals who share a common language, religion, morality, and aesthetics, that is to say, who have received the same education".

He proceeds to lay out the three echelons of pan-Turkist identity that he envisions:

- the Turks in the Republic of Turkey, a nation according to cultural and other criteria;
- the Oghuz Turks, referring also to the Turkmens of Azerbaijan, Iran and Khwarizm who... essentially have one common culture which is the same as that of the Turks of Turkey—all these four forming Oghuzistan;
- more distant, Turkic-speaking peoples, such as the Yakuts, Kirghiz, Uzbeks, Kipchaks and Tatars, possessed of a traditional linguistic and ethnic unity, having affinity—but not identity—with the Turkish culture.

The second stage was "Oghuzism", and the final stage would be the "Turanism" that he and other nationalist poets had been promoting since before World War I. While this broad conception of "Turkishness", of pan-Turkism, often embraced what Gökalp perceived to be ethnic commonality, he did not disparage other races, as some of his pan-Turkist successors later did.

Stating that the Turkic peoples in old ages were both feminists and democrats, he said that the Pan-Turkism movement and feminism were born together. He based its origins by referring to Shamanism. He described his anti-war attitude on the grounds that the gods of Turkic mythology were also the gods of peace and tranquility.

=== Turkification, Islamization and Westernization ===
For Gökalp the end of the Ottoman Empire marked the end of Pan-Islamism for Turks, who then should concentrate on nationalism but without rejecting their Islamic heritage, which was an integral part of the Turkish identity, nor Western modernity, which he deemed necessary for Turks to compete with other major geopolitical powers, ultimately for Gökalp Turkification, Islamization and Westernization were all legitimate interconnected phenomena as "these three components of the Turkish nation were both complementary and distinct from each other", as Ahmet Seyhun writes before summarizing Gökalp's position: "By Turkifying their culture, the Turks would return to their ancestral ethnic norms. By Islamization, they declare their loyalty to their religion, Islam. Moreover, the author argues that their nationality and their religion would not prevent the Turks to be a part of the Western civilization."

=== Sufism ===
Alp Eren Topal, a scholar from Bilkent University, while trying to showcase the originality of Gökalp, and not as someone who only "repeated" European ideas, also talks of the much-neglected influence of Sufism on the thinker: being "a big influence throughout his education and growth", he lauded its "military" lexicon and came to admire the solidarity found in the Sufi orders, "particularly the Naqshbandiyya", which not only had spiritual influence, but also a role in the modernization of the Ottoman Empire, while he also appreciated the metaphysics of medieval Andalusian thinker Ibn 'Arabi, saying that his idealism, as system of thought, was superior to that of George Berkeley or Immanuel Kant – who, he says, recycled ideas already known to Ibn 'Arabi, but without taking them too far –, and, far from being "Gnosticism-mysticism or pantheism", his ideas were pretty contemporary, resonating with those of moderns like Alfred Fouillée, Jean-Marie Guyau, Nietzsche, and William James, concluding that "in all its progression idealist philosophy has not surpassed 'Arabî’s absolute and perfect idealism".

=== Poetic works ===
In addition to his sociological and political career, Gökalp was also a prolific poet. His poetic work served to complement and popularize his sociological and nationalist views. In style and content, it revived a sense of pre-Islamic Turkish identity. The protagonist in his Kızılelma, the "ideal woman", suggests: "The people is like a garden, / we are supposed to be its gardeners! / First the bad shoots are to be cut / and then the scion is to be grafted." She is the teacher at Yeni Hayat ("New Life"), where Eastern and Western ideals meet and form a "new Turkish World".

His poetry departs from his more serious sociological works, though it too harnesses nationalist sentiment: "Run, take the standard and let it be planted once again in Plevna / Night and day, let the waters of the Danube run red with blood...." Perhaps his most famous poem was his 1911 Turan, which was first published in Genç Kalemler and served to complement his Turanist intellectual output: "For the Turks, Fatherland means neither Turkey, nor Turkestan; Fatherland is a large and eternal country--Turan!" During the First World War, his Kızıl Destan ("Red Epic") called for destroying Russia in the interest of pan-Turkism.

== Legacy ==
Ziya Gökalp has been characterized as "the father of Turkish nationalism", and even "the Grand Master of Turkism". His thought figured prominently in the political landscape of the Republic of Turkey, which emerged from the ruins of the Ottoman Empire around the time of his death. Citing the memoirs of former Unionist Muhittin Birgen, Kieser notes that CUP members who had embraced Gökalp's ideas during the First World War later rallied around Mustafa Kemal. His influence resonated in diverse ways. For instance, his Principles of Turkism had contended that Ottoman classical music was Byzantine in origin; this led to the state briefly banning Ottoman classical music from the radio in the 1930s, because Turkish folk music alone "represented the genius of the nation".

For popularizing pan-Turkism and Turanism, Gökalp has been viewed alternately as being racist and expansionist, and anti-racist and anti-expansionist. These opposite readings of his legacy are not easily divisible into proponents and detractors, as nationalist elements in Turkey (such as the "Nationalist Movement Party") have appropriated his work to contend that he supported a physical realization of Turanism, rather than a mere ideological pan-Turkist kinship. Some readings of Gökalp contend, to the contrary, that his Turanism and pan-Turkism were linguistic and cultural models, ideals from which a post-Ottoman identity could be derived, rather than a militant call for the physical expansion of the Republic of Turkey.

Although he often held quite different ideas, Arab nationalist Sati al-Husri was profoundly influenced by Gökalp.

Mustafa Kemal Atatürk once said "Father of my meat and bones is Ali Riza Efendi and father of my thought is Ziya Gökalp". Kieser also traces Gökalp's influence in Atatürk's later pseudoscientific Turkish History Thesis, noting that it retained Gökalp's emphasis on Turkish national primacy while, in addition, incorporating racial anthropology that Gökalp himself had not employed.

Recep Tayyip Erdoğan was put in jail for having recited, in 1997, a 1960 poem by Cevat Örnek, "The divine army", that he incorrectly attributed to Gökalp; the poem was considered to be "Islamist" in nature and thus threatening the country's secularism.

Gökalp's opinion of the Armenian genocide was that "there was no Armenian massacre, there was a Turkish-Armenian arrangement. They stabbed us in the back, we stabbed them back". This view was widely held among the Young Turks.

The house where he was born has been converted into the Ziya Gökalp Museum in 1956.

== Works ==
- The Principles of Turkism.
- History of Turkish Civilization
- Kızılelma (poems)
- Turkism, Islamism and Modernism
- Sociological Investigations of Kurdish Tribes.
