= Zeynep =

- Gender: Feminine given name (common in Turkey), female given name
- Language: Turkish

Origin
- Origin: Arabic
- Meaning: Turkish for "precious rock, precious gem", Arabic for "a fragrant flower" and "Beauty of her father" (زينب)
- Region of origin: Middle East

Other names
- Alternative spelling: Zaynab, Zainab, Zaynab, Zayneb

Zeynep is the Turkish form of the Arabic female given name Zaynab. Zeynep means "precious rock, precious gem" and may refer to:

== People ==
- Zeynep Ahunbay (born 1946), Turkish scholar of antiquities
- Zeynep Akata, Turkish computer scientist
- Zeynep Sibel Algan (born 1955), Turkish diplomat
- Zeynep Çelik (judoka) (born 1996), Turkish para judoka
- Zeynep Çelik (scholar), Turkish architect and academic
- Zeynep Çelik-Butler, Turkish-American Professor of Electrical Engineering
- Zeynep Ergun (1953–2022), Turkish academic
- Zeynep Fadıllıoğlu (born 1955), Turkish architect
- Zeynep Karahan Uslu, Turkish politician and activist
- Zeynep Nur Kapaklıkaya (born 2000), Turkish handballer
- Zeynep Kınacı (1972–1996), Kurdish militant and first ever suicide bomber
- Zeynep Koçer (born 1998), Turkish footballer
- Zeynep Korkmaz (1921–2025), Turkish scholar
- Zeynep Kuray (born 1978), Turkish journalist
- Zeynep Mestan (born 2004), Turkish football amangerand former footballer
- Zeynep Oduncu (born 1987), Turkish journalist
- Zeynep Oral (born 1946), Turkish journalist
- Zeynep Sevde Paksu (born 1983), Turkish writer and publisher
- Zeynep Sönmez (born 2002), Turkish tennis player
- Zeynep Sultan (1714–1774), Ottoman princess
- Zeynep Tufekci, Turkish writer and academic
- Zeynep Karahan Uslu (born 1969), Turkish politician and public relations specialist

== Arts and entertainment ==
- Farah Zeynep Abdullah (born 1989), Iraqi-Turkish actress
- Zeynep Bastık (born 1993), Turkish singer
- Zeynep Çamcı (born 1986), Turkish actress and screenwriter
- Zeynep Değirmencioğlu (born 1954), Turkish actress
- Zeynep Dizdar (born 1976), Turkish singer
- Zeynep Eronat (born 1963), Turkish actress
- Zeynep Gedizlioğlu (born 1977), Turkish composer
- Zeynep Günay Tan (born 1975), Turkish director
- Zeynep Özder (born 1980), Turkish actress
- Zeynep Tedü (born 1943), Turkish actress
- Zeynep Tokuş (born 1977), Turkish actress and beauty pageant winner
- Zeynep Tuğçe Bayat (born 1990), Turkish actress
- Zeynep Üçbaşaran, Turkish pianist

== Sports ==
- Zeynep Acet (born 1995), Turkish Paralympian sprinter
- Zeynep Nur Agin (born 2007), Turkish karateka
- Zeynep Gamze Koçer (born 1998), Turkish footballer
- Zeynep Funda Teoman (born 1984), Turkish basketball referee
- Zeynep Kerimoğlu (born 2003), Turkish footballer
- Zeynep Murat (born 1983), Turkish Taekwondo practitioner
- Zeynep Oka (born 1966), Turkish sport shooter
- Zeynep Seda Uslu (born 1983), Turkish volleyball player
- Zeynep Sever (born 1989), Turkish-Belgian volleyball player
- Zeynep Sönmez (born 2002), Turkish tennis player
- Zeynep Sude Demirel (born 2000), Turkish volleyball player
- Zeynep Taşkın (born 2003), Turkish taekwondo athlete
- Zeynep Yetgil (born 2000), Turkish wrestler
- Elif Zeynep Celep (born 1994), Turkish gymnast
- Viktoriya Zeynep Güneş (born 1998), Ukrainian-Turkish swimmer

== See also ==
- MV Karadeniz Powership Zeynep Sultan, Liberia-flagged Turkish powership
- Zeynep's Eight Days, 2007 Turkish film
- Zeynep Sultan Mosque, 1769-built mosque in Istanbul, Turkey for Ahmed III's daughter Zeynep Asıme Sultan
- Zeynep (storm), a 2022 cyclone over northwestern Europe
