= Zaynab =

Arabic female given name

Zaynab (Arabic: زينب, [ˈzeːnæb, ˈziːnæb, ˈzajnab]), and variant spellings, is an Arabic female given name meaning 'a flower in the desert'.

Zainab bint Muhammad was a daughter of the Islamic prophet Muhammad, Zaynab bint Ali was a granddaughter, two of his wives were Zaynab bint Jahsh and Zaynab bint Khuzayma.

In 2021, the Chicago Tribune found that Zeinab was the most popular name for girls among names unusually frequent in Michigan, "17.2 times more common than nationwide."

Bosnian forms of the name are Zeineb, Zejneb and Zejneba. The Somali form of the name is Seynab, and the Turkish form is Zeynep.

Other variants are Zainab, Zaenab, Zayneb, Zeinab, Zenab, Zineb, Zinab, Zynab, Zaineb, Zeynab and Zeynep.

== People with the name ==
- Zainab Abbas (born 1988), Pakistani sports presenter
- Zaynab Abd al-Razzaq (born 1938), Moroccan lawyer and the first female judge in Morocco
- Zaynab al-Awadiya, medieval physician
- Zainab Ahmad (born 1980), American prosecutor
- Zainab Ahmed (born 1960), Nigerian politician
- Zeinab Badawi (born 1959), Sudanese-British television and radio journalist for the BBC
- Zaynab bint Al-Harith (died 629), Jewish woman who poisoned Muhammad
- Zaynab bint Ali (c. 626–682), daughter of Ali ibn Abi Talib, the sister of Husayn ibn Ali, and granddaughter of Muhammad
- Zaynab bint Jahsh (c. 590–641), a wife of Muhammad
- Zaynab bint Khuzayma (c. 596 – 625), a wife of Muhammad
- Zainab bint Muhammad (600–629), daughter of Khadijah bint Khuwaylid and Muhammad. Mother of Umamah wife of Ali Ibn Abi Talib.
- Zainab Biisheva (1908–1996), Bashkir poet and writer
- Zainab Chottani (born 1982), Pakistan-based fashion designer
- Zainab Cobbold (1876–1963), Lady Evelyn Cobbold, Anglo-Scot convert to Islam
- Zaynab Dosso (born 1999), Italian sprinter
- Zeinab Sade Elhawary, American politician and community organizer
- Zainab Fasiki (born 1994), Moroccan graphic artist, activist for women's rights and mechanical engineer
- Zeynab Jalalian (born 1982), Kurdish Iranian, often described as a political activist
- Zainab Johnson, American actress and comedian
- Zainab Khawla (born 1969), Syrian politician
- Zainab al-Khawaja (born 1983), Bahraini human rights activist
- Zainab Masood, character in the British TV soap opera EastEnders
- Zaynab an-Nafzawiyyah (died 1072), influential figure in the Almoravid movement
- Zeinab Soleimani (born 1991), manager of the Qasem Soleimani Foundation International, daughter of Qasem Soleimani
- Zainab Salbi (born 1969), American activist
- Zainab Tari, (a queen of Sindh)
- Raja Perempuan Zainab II, queen consort of Kelantan, Malaysia
