= Yeşim Büber =

Turkish actress (born 1977)

- Born: 10 August 1977 (age 48); Aydın, Turkey
- Occupation: Actress
- Years active: 1996–present
- Spouses: Kâmil Güler (div.); Mehmet Aksın (m. 2006)
- Children: 2

Yeşim Büber (born 10 August 1977) is a Turkish actress. She is best known for series Kaybolan Yıllar.

== Biography ==
Yeşim Büber was born in Aydın on 10 August 1977. Her mother was a dressmaker, and her father was a freelancer. After her primary schooling, her family moved to İzmir, where they stayed for a year and a half, after which they moved to Istanbul. She signed on with the Neşe Erberk agency and appeared in a number of commercials. She studied acting at Can Gürzap's acting school.

Büber played the title role in the series Zeynep (1998). Subsequent notable roles have included Aynalı Tahir (1998), Yer Altında Dünya Var (2001), Nasıl Evde Kaldım (2001), Çaylak (2003).

With Burak Hakkı, she starred in Kaybolan Yıllar and Kırık Ayna. She acted in the comedy film İnşaat (Under Construction) (2003), directed by Ömer Vargı, for which she won a Sadri Alışık award. She had guest role in hit series Bıçak Sırtı.

== Filmography ==
- Bu Sevda Bitmez (1996)
- Zeynep (1998)
- Aynalı Tahir (1998)
- Dedelerimi Evlendirirken (2000)
- Şöhret Tutkusu (2000)
- Şaşı Felek Çıkmazı (2000)
- Yeraltında Dünya Var (2001)
- Benim İçin Ağlama (2001)
- Nasıl Evde Kaldım (2001)
- Bulutbey (2002)
- Gelin (2003)
- Serseri Aşıklar (2003)
- İnşaat (2003)
- Çaylak (2003)
- Kırık Ayna (2003)
- Üç Kişilik Aşk (2004)
- Arapsaçı (2004)
- Dolunay (2005)
- Yolda / Rüzgar Geri Getirirse (2005)
- Barda (2006)
- İspinozlar (2006)
- Kaybolan Yıllar (2006)
- Bıçak Sırtı (2007)
- Aile Reisi (2009)
- Zehirli Sarmasik (2011)
- Acayip Hikayeler (2012)
- İnşaat 2 (2014)
- Siyah İnci (2017)
