= Peride Celal =

Turkish writer (1916-2013)

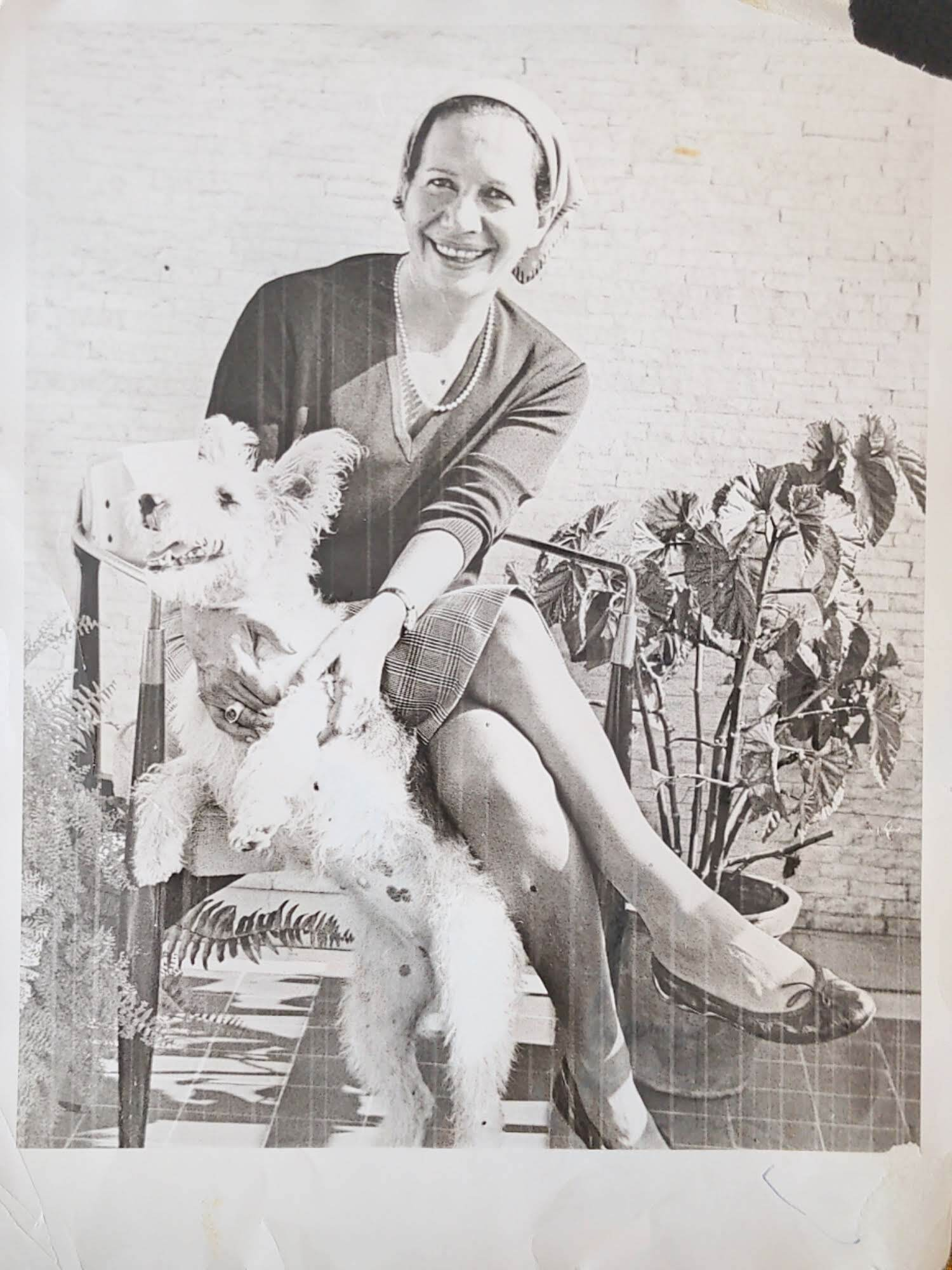
- Born: June 10, 1916; Istanbul, Ottoman Empire
- Died: June 15, 2013 (aged 97); Istanbul, Turkey
- Occupations: Novelist, story writer
- Spouse: Atıf Yönsel (1940s? – 1978)
- Children: Zeynep Ergun

Peride Celal Yönsel (June 10, 1916 – June 15, 2013), commonly known as Peride Celal or Peride Celâl, was a Turkish novelist and story writer. Her work has won major awards such as the Sedat Simavi Literature Award in 1977, and the Orhan Kemal Novel Prize in 1991.

== Early life ==
Born in Istanbul, she completed her high school education in Samsun and at the French curriculum Lycée Sainte-Pulchérie in Istanbul. She spent most of her childhood in Anatolia.

== Career ==
After returning to Istanbul, Celal worked at Elektrik Şirketi and Neşriyat Bürosu. In 1944, she went to Switzerland to work as an assistant at the Press Office of the Turkish Embassy in Bern. Upon her return to Turkey, she served at the governmental press and publishing agency (Turkish: Basın Yayın Kurumu) and the newspaper "Yeni İstanbul".

Celal acquired her love of literature from her cultured mother, and started writing at a young age. Her first story, Ak Kiz, was published in the weekly Yedigün in 1935, which was followed by her stories, reportages and novels in the newspapers Son Posta, Cumhuriyet, Tan and Milliyet. Her literary career can be divided into two parts: During the first half, she wrote mostly romantic novels. During the second half, she focused on the twisted and corrupt lives of the Turkish bourgeoisie.

== Death ==
Celal died on June 15, 2013, but it was announced two days later by her family. She was survived by her daughter Zeynep Ergun, who was the chair of the English Language and Literature Department at Istanbul University.

== Recognition ==
In 1977 Celal was honored for her novel Üç Yirmi Dört Saat with the Turkish Sedat Simavi Literature Award along with Fazıl Hüsnü Dağlarca. The 1991 Orhan Kemal Novel Prize was bestowed on Peride Celal for her novel Kurtlar.

In 1996, Selim İleri published a book titled Present to Peride Celal (Peride Celal’e Armağan) edited by 19 Turkish authors.

== Works ==
=== Novels ===
- Sönen Alev (1938)
- Yaz Yağmuru (1940)
- Ana Kız (1941)
- Kızıl Vazo (1941)
- Ben Vurmadım (1941)
- Atmaca (1944)
- Aşkın Doğuşu (1944)
- Kırkıncı Tepe (1945)
- Dar Yol (1949)
- Üç Kadının Romanı (1954)
- Kırkıncı Oda (1958)
- Gecenin Ucundaki Işık (1963)
- Güz Şarkısı (1966)
- Evli Bir Kadının Günlüğünden (1971)
- Üç Yirmidört Saat (1977)
- Kurtlar (1990)
- Deli Aşk (2002)

=== Stories ===
- Jaguar (1978)
- Bir Hanım Efendinin Ölümü (1981)
- Pay Kavgası (1985).

== Gallery ==
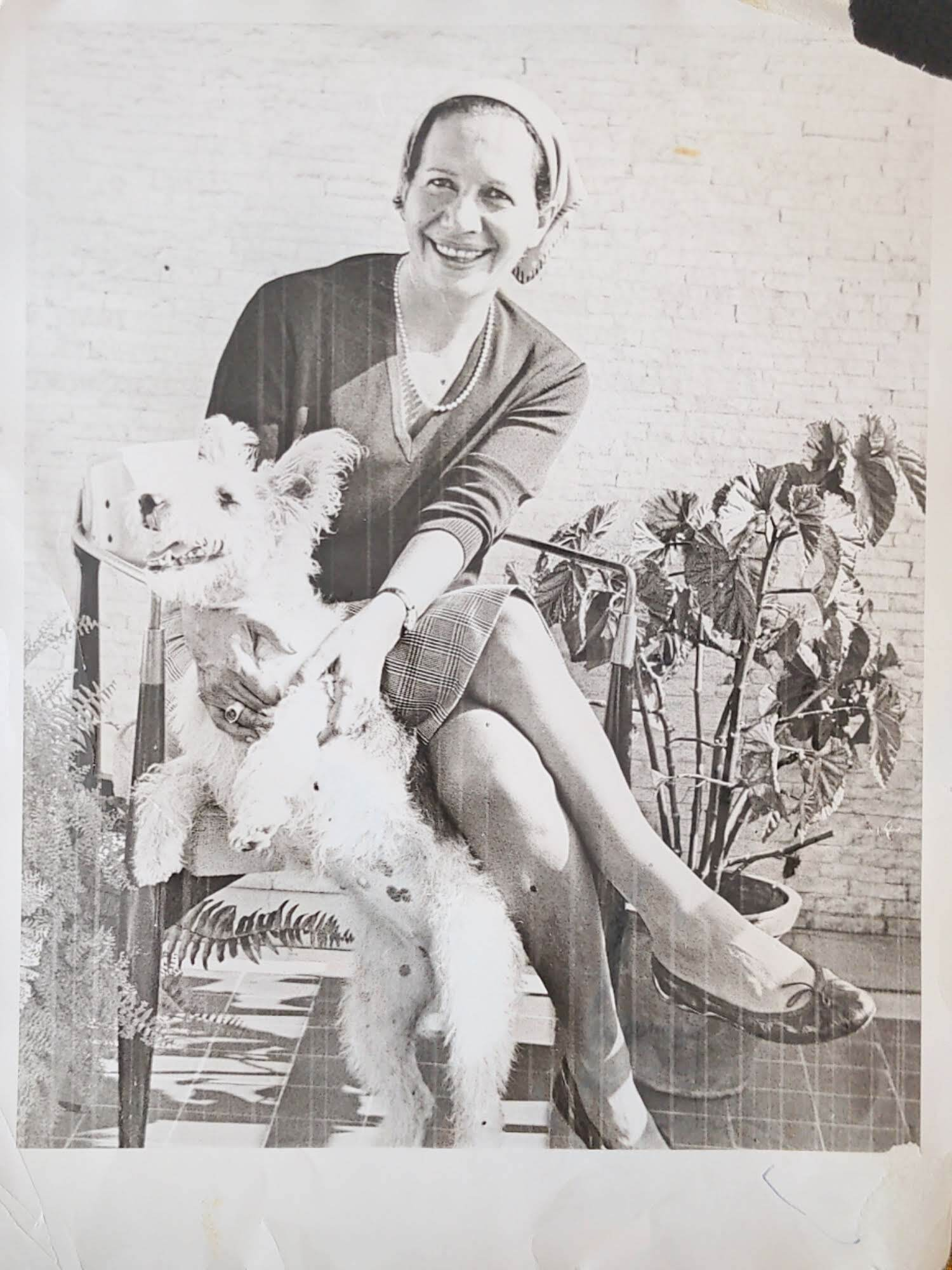

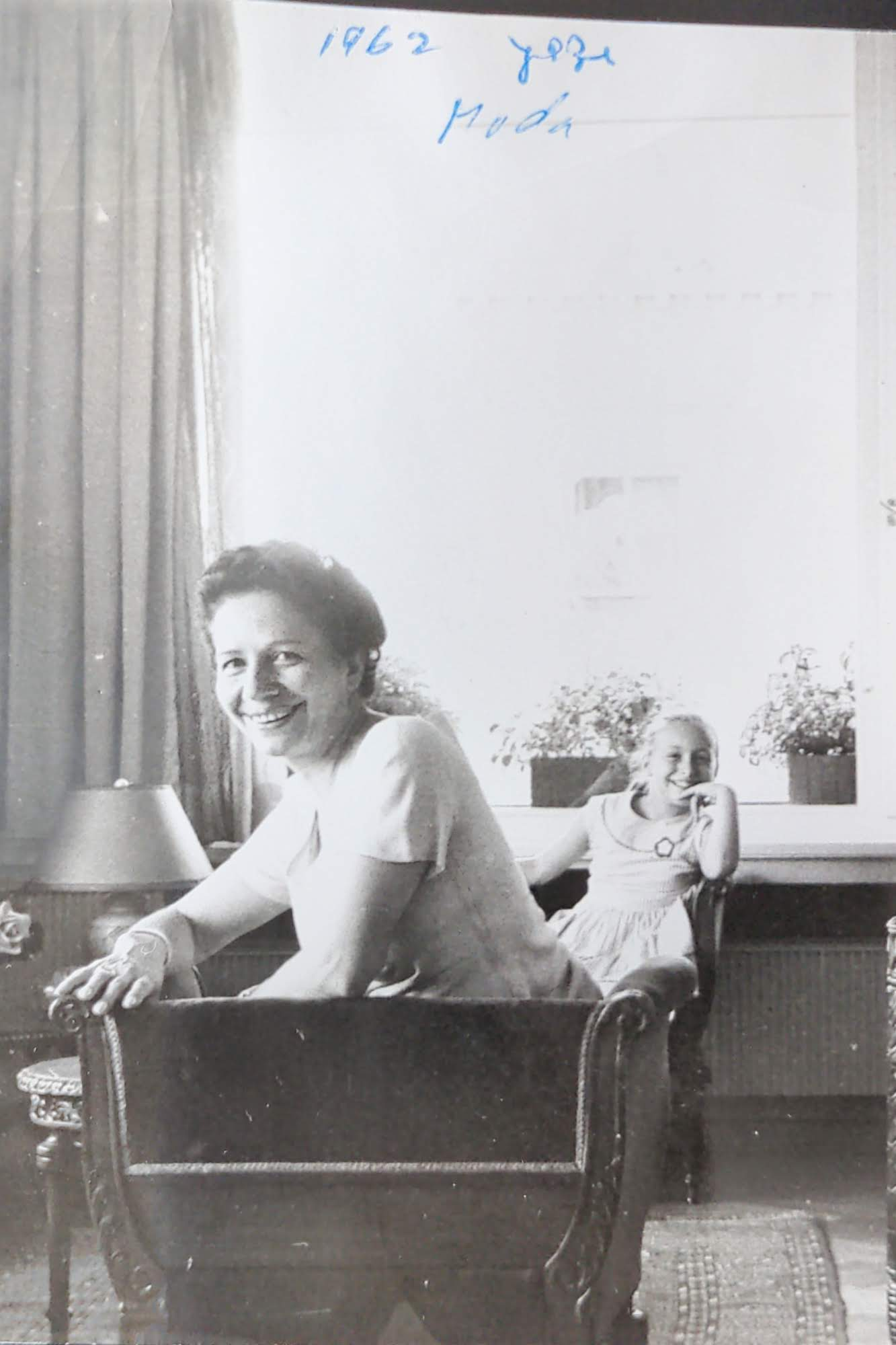

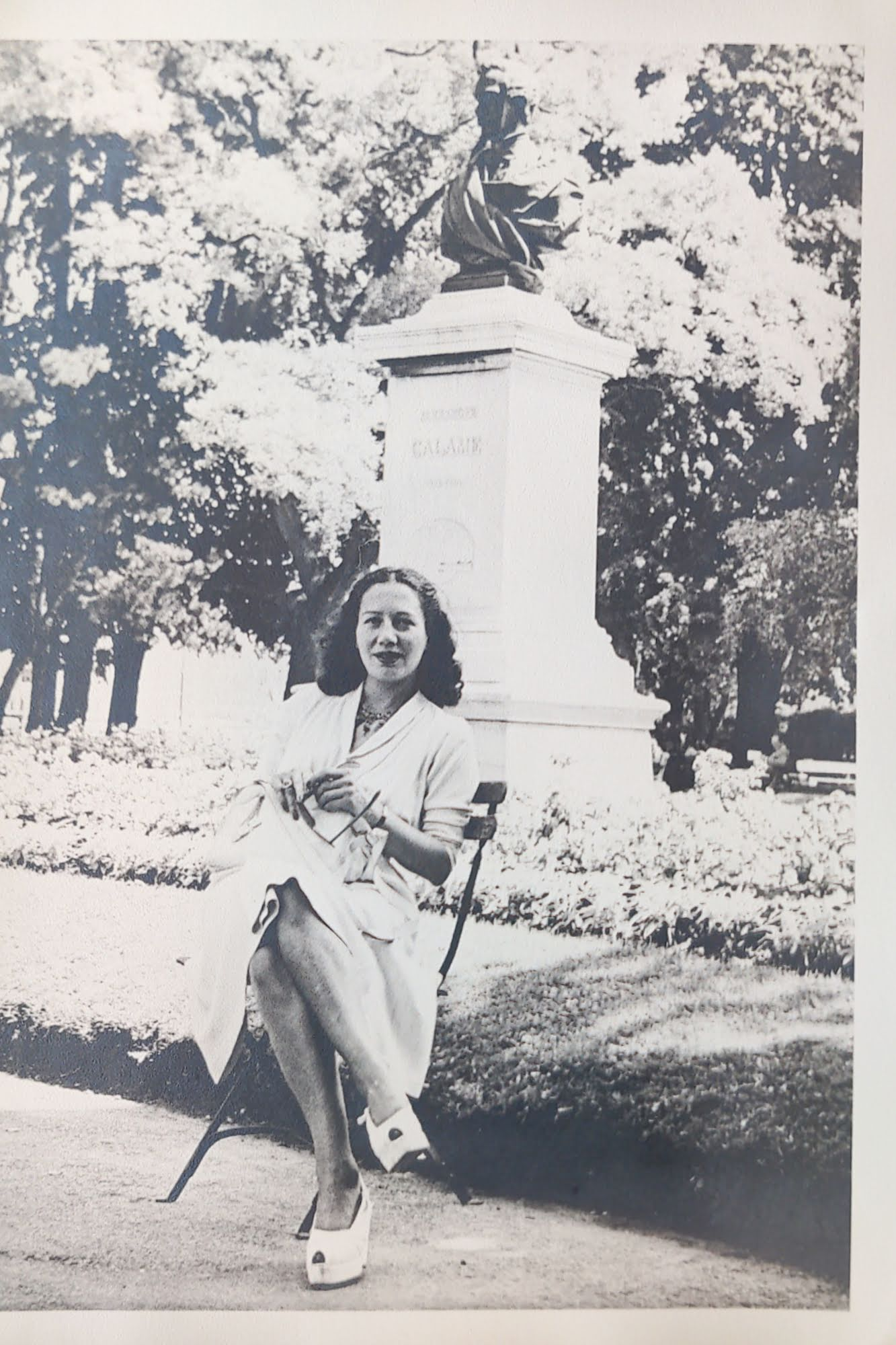

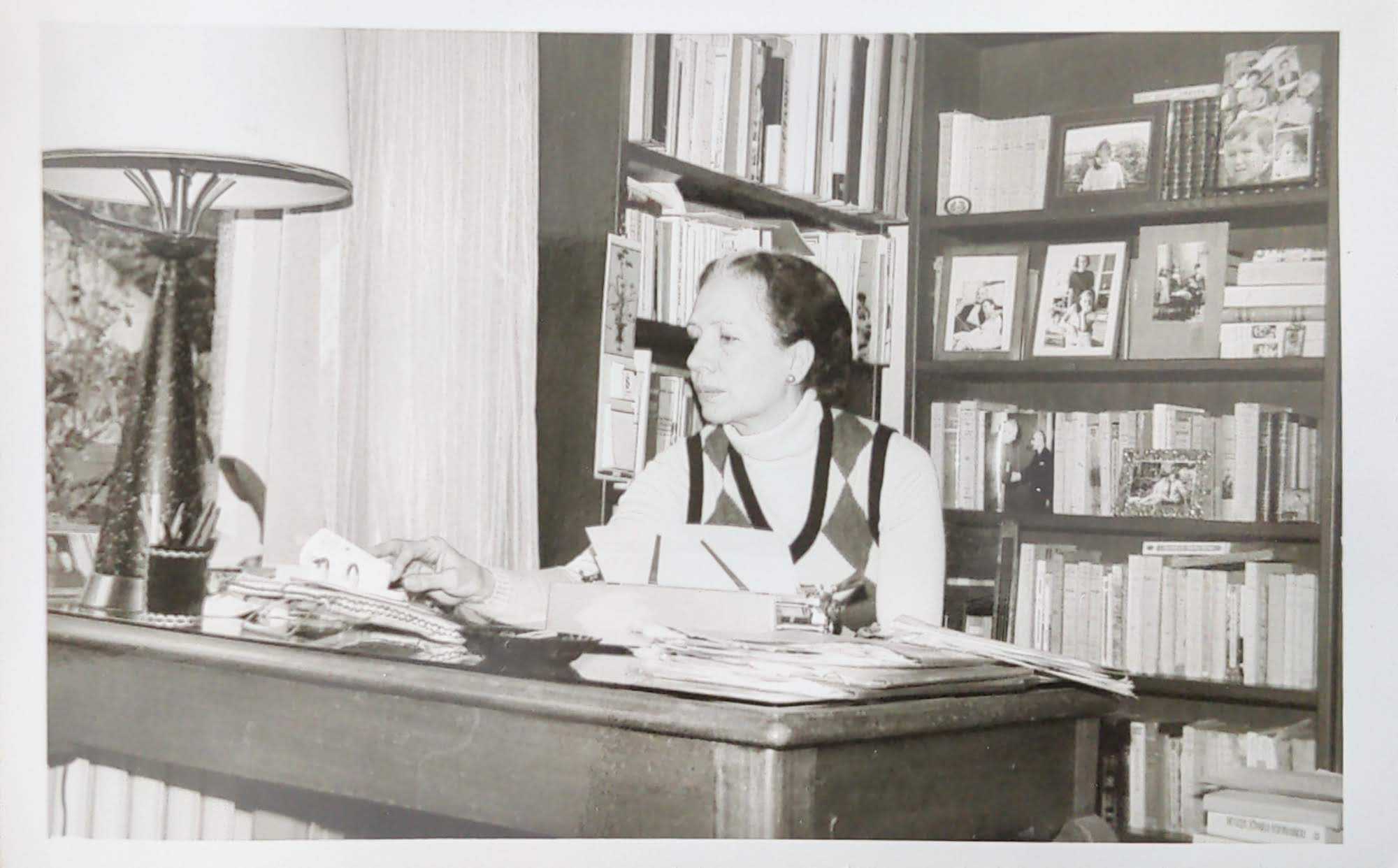

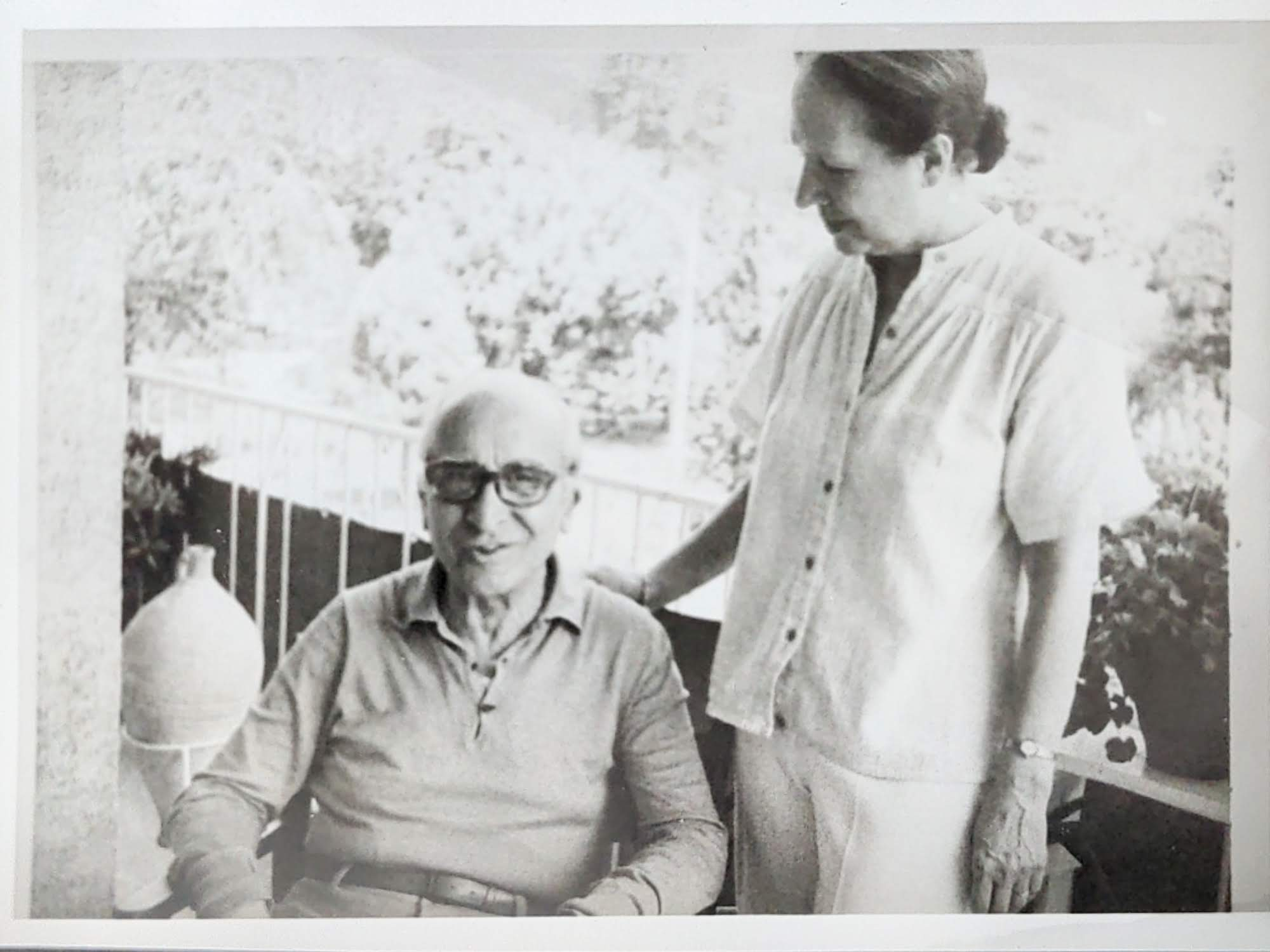

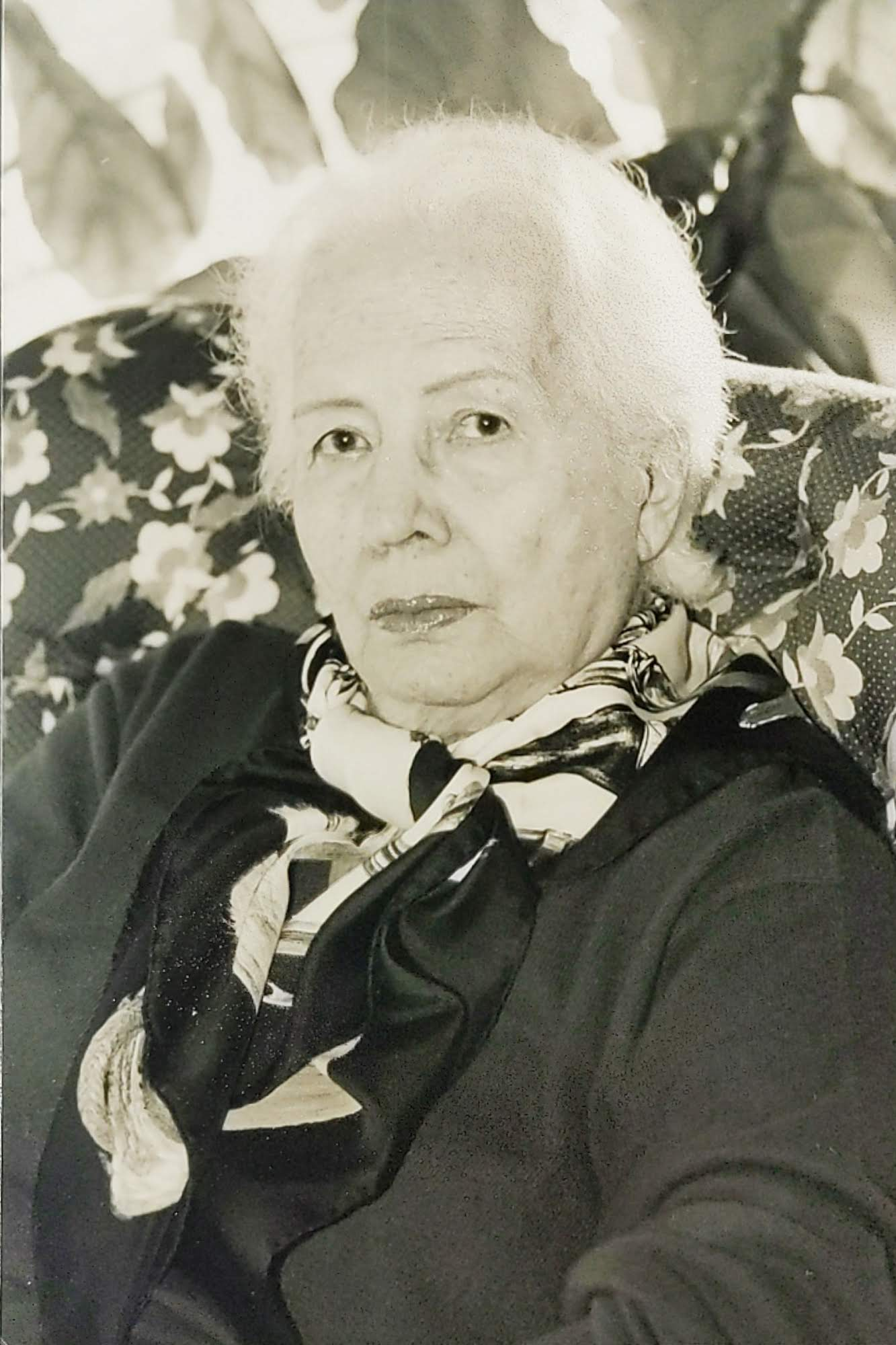

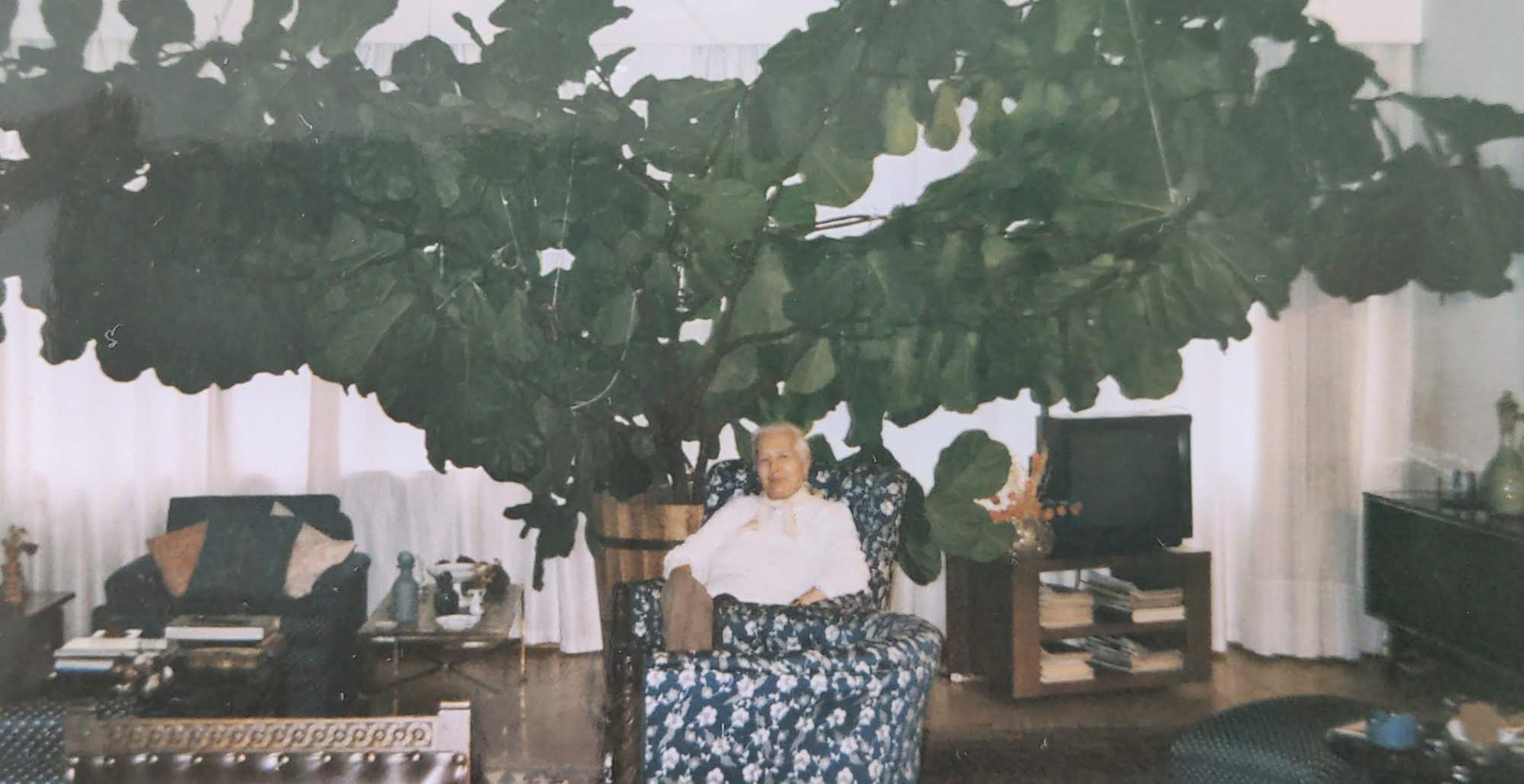
