= Zeineb =

Bosniak given name

Zeineb or Zejneb is a Bosnian female given name, transliterated from the Arabic name Zaynab, and may refer to:

- Zeineb Benzina, Tunisian archeologist
