= Banu Awd =

Banu Awd بنو أود
- Qahtanite Arabs
- Ethnicity: Arab
- Nisba: Al-Awadi
- Location: Yemen, Arabian Peninsula
- Descended from: Awd ibn Sa'd al-'Ashirah
- Parent tribe: Madhhij
- Religion: Paganism, later Islam

Banu Awd (Arabic: بنو أود) is a Qahtanite Arab tribe that historically inhabited Yemen in the south of the Arabian Peninsula.

== History and origins ==
The Banu Awd are descendants of Awd ibn Sa'd al-'Ashirah ibn Madh'hij. A Qahtanite tribe that mostly settled in Yemen in the pre-Islamic period. Awd is recorded to have two sons: Munabbah and Ka'b.

Although Arabic history books scarcely mention Banu Awd, they are recorded in most of the Arabic genealogist works. Banu Awd is recorded to have participated in the Battle of Siffin on the side of Ali's army. A man from Banu Awd named 'Amr ibn Aws was among the captives from the battle. They were delivered to Muawiya I to determine their fate. General Amr ibn al-'As suggested to the caliph to kill all them, the captive Amr ibn Aws interrupted and said to Muawiya: "You are my maternal uncle so do not kill me" The Banu Awd came from Kufa and Syria to ask the caliph to release their fellow tribesman. Muawiya then asserted that if the man was telling the truth and that he was indeed this man's uncle he would release him without the need for the tribe to intervene. Amr ibn Aws proceeded to explain to the caliph that he is the son of Umm Habibah Muawiya's sister and the wife of the Prophet (The wives of the prophet were given the honorific title Mother of the Believers) Muawiya, astonished at the man's words said: "Among these there is nobody who would have thought of it other than he! (meaning Amr ibn Aws)" And he set him free.

A notable member of Banu Awd known as Zaynab of Banu Awd was a prominent physician in pre-Islamic period.

== See also ==
- Tribes of Arabia
- Muhammad's wives
