= Zainab Fasiki =

Moroccan comics artist, mechanical engineer and activist for women's rights

Zainab Fasiki زينب فاسيكي
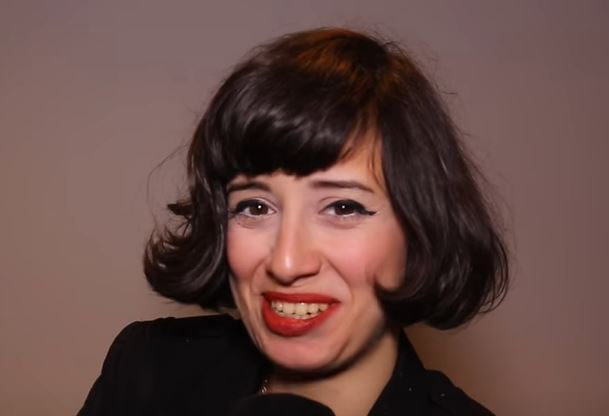
- Born: July 21, 1994 (age 31); Fez, Morocco
- Education: ENSEM
- Occupations: graphic artist, activist
- Years active: 2017–present
- Website: Zainab Fasiki on Facebook

Zainab Fasiki (Arabic: زينب فاسيكي; born July 21, 1994) is a Moroccan graphic artist, activist for women's rights and mechanical engineer by training. She became internationally known after 2019, following her graphic novel Hshouma, corps et sexualité au Maroc which was translated from French into Moroccan Arabic, Spanish, Galician and Italian.

== Life and career ==
Born and raised in the city of Fez, she started drawing when she was four years old. In 2014, she moved to Casablanca, where she has lived since. Fasiki joined the comic book collective Skefkef, and in 2017 published a first feminist comic strip, called Omor (Things), in which she explored the difficulties of a woman's life in Morocco. Through the characters of three young Moroccan women, she denounced the social inequalities between men and women.

Her work, which she publishes on social media and as graphic novels, criticizes censorship, taboos and notions of shame in Morocco. Apart from working freelance, she is also the founder of the collective group "Women Power" that sponsored twenty women to take part in workshops about women's rights.

Many of Fasiki's illustrations are self-portraits, often in the nude, inspired by women in the traditional Moroccan hammam or painted as comic characters like Wonder Woman. One of her well-known images is a nude, all green figure of herself keeping watch over Casablanca. Entitled The Protector of Casablanca, she sees this figure as an attempt to fight against daily harassment on the street. In her comics, the women sometimes do not have eyes, because she says that "I see women as statues in my society and I want them to be free human beings." One of her comics was based on personal experience of harassment on public transport and called "Buses are made to transport people, not to rape girls." She has also claimed that she has never felt free in Morocco or with her graphic art, where printers are reluctant to print her work. She prefers to portray women undressed, as strong and unafraid, and tries to portray women's bodies in art and media without taboo. As with her comics about sexual education that she published in Skefkef magazine, she wants to counter violence against women and the patriarchal views of women as sexual objects.

=== Hshouma and other graphic artworks ===
Fasiki became internationally known for her 2018 collection of drawings, called the Hshouma project, where she depicted comic-style images of nude women, calling out against double standards and sexual taboos. Hshouma ("shame" in Moroccan Arabic) was first exhibited in 2018 in an exhibition following a workshop at the arts centre Matadero in Madrid, Spain, and later published as a graphic novel in Moroccan Arabic, French, Spanish and other languages.

In October 2018, she partnered with the UN Refugee Agency in Morocco to animate a story of four refugees from sub-Saharan Africa, including a woman who had been subjected to female genital mutilation. In November 2018, her work was exhibited at Le Cube art gallery in Rabat, and in October 2019, she was named a TIME magazine "Next Generation Leader" for her comic book Hshouma. In 2020, she illustrated the French book L'amour fait loi about sexual discrimination, with texts by Moroccan and French writers such as Abdellah Taïa, Leïla Slimani and others.

Fasiki has named Egyptian feminist writer Nawal El Saadawi and French-Iranian graphic artist Marjane Satrapi as influences, and wants to counter Western narratives about women in the Middle East and North Africa as "either hypersexual or repressed".

== Printed works ==
- L'amour fait loi - Illustrations by Zainab Fasiki, Éditions Le Sélénite, 2020
- Hshouma: Corps et Sexualité au Maroc. Arabic and French editions, Massot Éditions, 2019
- Feyrouz versus the World (2018)
- Omor: Only between us (2017)
