= Zaynab al-Awadiya =

Zaynab al-Awadiya (Arabic: زينب الأوَدية, Zaynab al-Awadiyyah, sometimes spelled as al-Awadiyyah or al-Awdiyah) Also known as Zaynab of Banu Awd (Arabic: زينب طبيبة بني أود) was a 7th-century Arab physician and expert oculist. She was a member of the Arab tribe of Banu Awd. As a proficient medical practitioner, she was widely renowned among the Arabs due to her expertise in treating sore eyes and wounds. Zaynab has been mentioned in different medieval Arabic books, in particular the Kitab al-Aghani (The Book of Songs), a major work of the 10th-century historian Abu al-Faraj al-Isfahani, and later in the encyclopedic work of the 13th-century physician Ibn Abi Usaibia, known as Uyūn ul-Anbāʾ fī Ṭabaqāt al-Aṭibbā (Biographical Encyclopedia of Physicians).

== See also ==
- List of pre-modern Arab scientists and scholars
- Ophthalmology in the medieval Islamic world
