= Zeynep Ergun =

Zeynep Ergun (1953 – 2022) was a professor at Institute of Social Sciences English Language and Literature Department of Istanbul University.

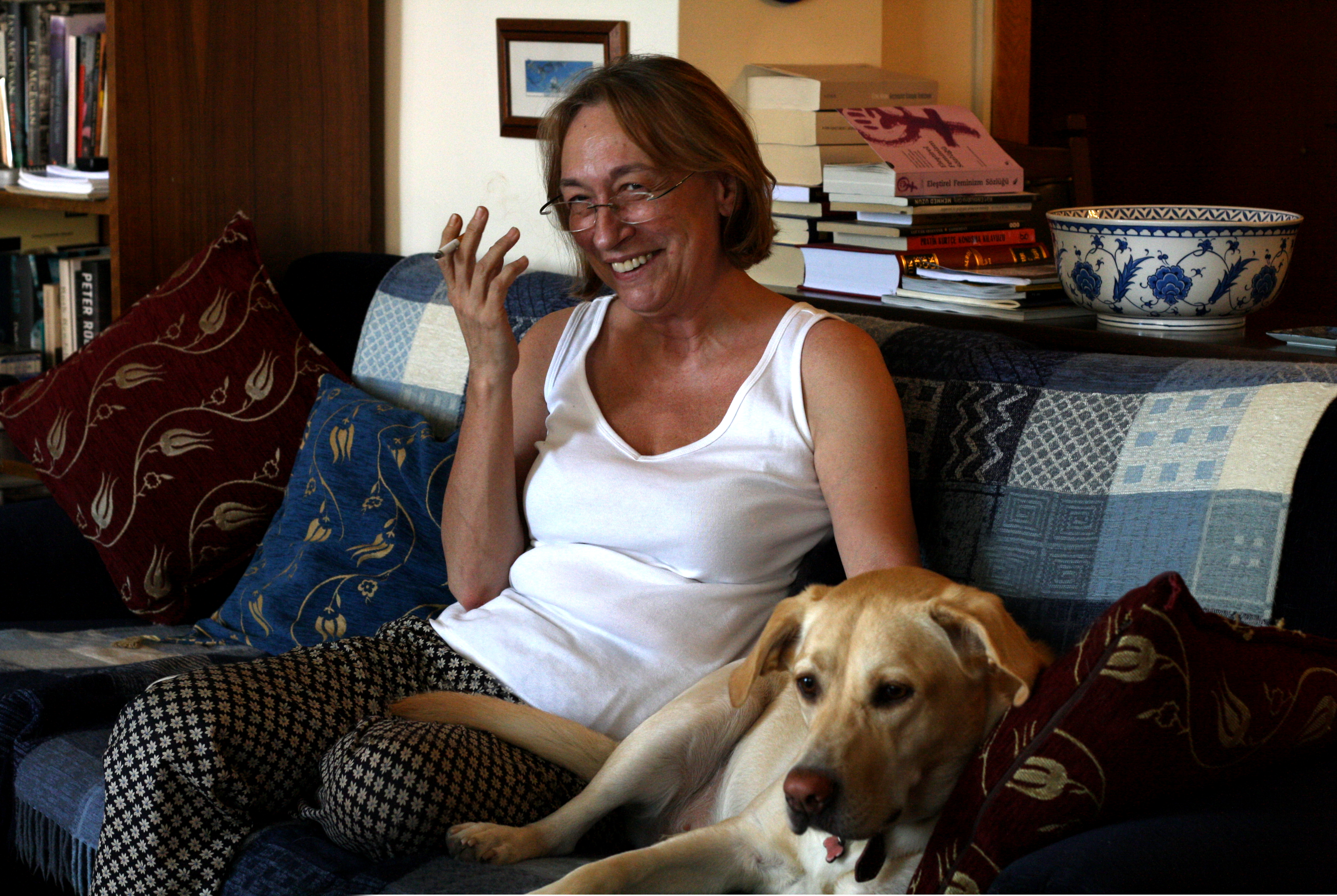
Zeynep Ergun, with her beloved companion Bacı, 2009

== Education and career ==
Ergun graduated from Robert College high school in 1972 and received her BA from Boğaziçi University English Language and Literature Department in 1978. She received her PhD in 1988 from Istanbul University Institute of Social Sciences English Language and Literature Department. Between 1988 and 1995, she worked at the same institution as an assistant associate professor. She became the chair of the department in 1997 and a full professor in 1999.

== Personal life ==
She was the only child of late writer Peride Celal (1916-2013).

== Publications ==
- Erkeğin Yittiği Yerde - Everest Yayınları 2009; Notos Yayınları, 2020.
- My Father’s House: The Function of Houses in the 18th Century English Novel. Montreux, London, Washington: Minerva Press, 1996.
- Kardeşimin Bekçisi: Başlangıcından II. Dünya Savaşı’na Kadar İngiliz Detektif Yazın, Everest Publications, İstanbul, 2003.
- Kadınlar Dile Düşünce, edited by Jale Parla ve Sibel Irzık, İletişim Publications, İstanbul 2004: “Yeni Yüzyılda Eski İngiliz Kadını”.
- Jane Eyre: Kadın, Öfke, Toplum ve Uzlaşma. Argos, Issue:18, pp. 73–79, İstanbul, 1990.
- Virginia Woolf: Yaşam ve Yazı. Argos, Issue:17, pp. 151–154. İstanbul, 1990.
- Mrs Dalloway: Ya da Başkaldırı: Argos, Issue:20, pp. 146–158, İstanbul, 1990.
- The Rainbow: Kadının Arayışı: Argos, Issue:22, pp. 64–77, İstanbul, 1990.
- Charlotte Brontë: Tutkulu Bir Kişilik: Argos, Issue:23, pp. 60–63, İstanbul, 1990.
- Victoria Döneminde Roman ve Okuru: Argos, Issue:25, pp. 57–60, İstanbul, 1990.
- Büyük Umutlar: Kurmacanın içindeki Kurmaca: Argos, Issue:26, pp. 50–60, İstanbul, 1990.
- Lack of Communication in Dickens’s Hard Times: Litera, Volume 10, pp. 19–46, Istanbul University Press, Istanbul, 1991.
- Mary Shelley ve Yaratma Uğraşının Tehlikeleri: Kuram, Volume 2, pp. 63–70, Kur Publications, İstanbul 1993.
- The Picture of Dorian Gray: The Genesis of a Painting: İstanbul Üniversitesi Edebiyat Fakültesi Publication, İstanbul 1995.
- Sanatı Yitirme Kaygısı: Yeni Hayat Üzerine Bir Deneme: Cumhuriyet, Kitap Eki, Issue 256, pp. 14–16, Yeni Gün Haber Ajansı Basım ve Yayıncılık A.Ş., İstanbul, 1995.
- ’Koşucu’: Etkinlik ve Edilgenlik Sorunları: Peride Celal’e Armağan, edited by Selim İleri, Oğlak Armağan Kitaplar, pp. 152–158, Oğlak Yayıncılık ve Reklamcılık Ltd. Şti., İstanbul 1996.
- Robinson Crusoe’da Ev Kavramı: Nar: Edebiyat Ürünleri Dergisi, Issue:12, pp. 66–78, Oğlak Yayıncılık ve Reklamcılık Ltd. Şti., İstanbul 1996.
- Order Restored: A Study of Wilkie Collins’s The Moonstone: Litera, Volume 12, pp. 99–135, Istanbul University Press, Istanbul, 1998.
- Sanatı Yitirme Kaygısı: Orhan Pamuk’u Anlamak, derleyen Engin Kılıç, İletişim Yayınları, İstanbul 1999, pp. 247–264
- The Misfits (book): Yayına hazır makale, Stand Magazine Ltd., Cambridge University Press, Shaftsbury Road, Cambridge

== Gallery ==
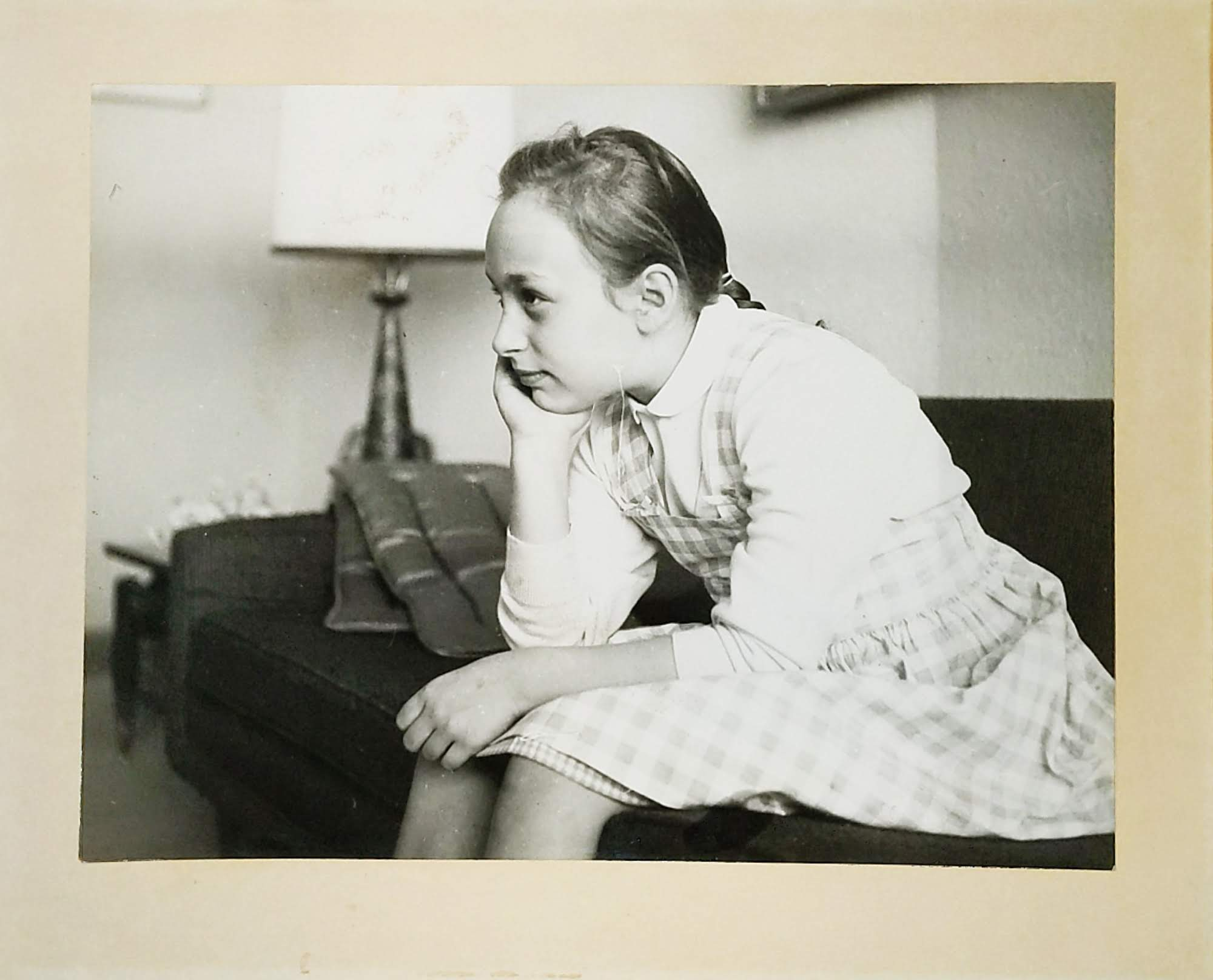

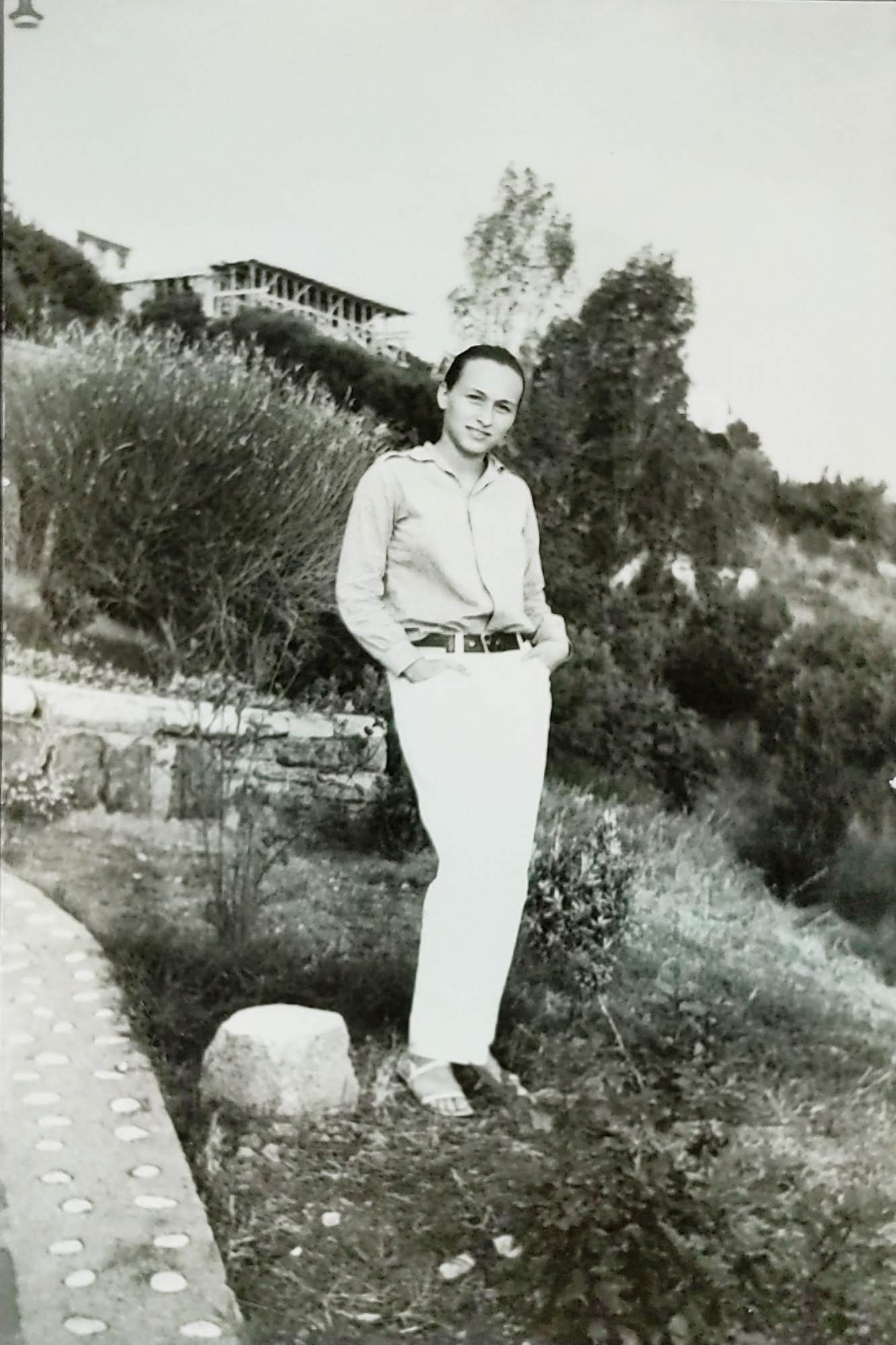

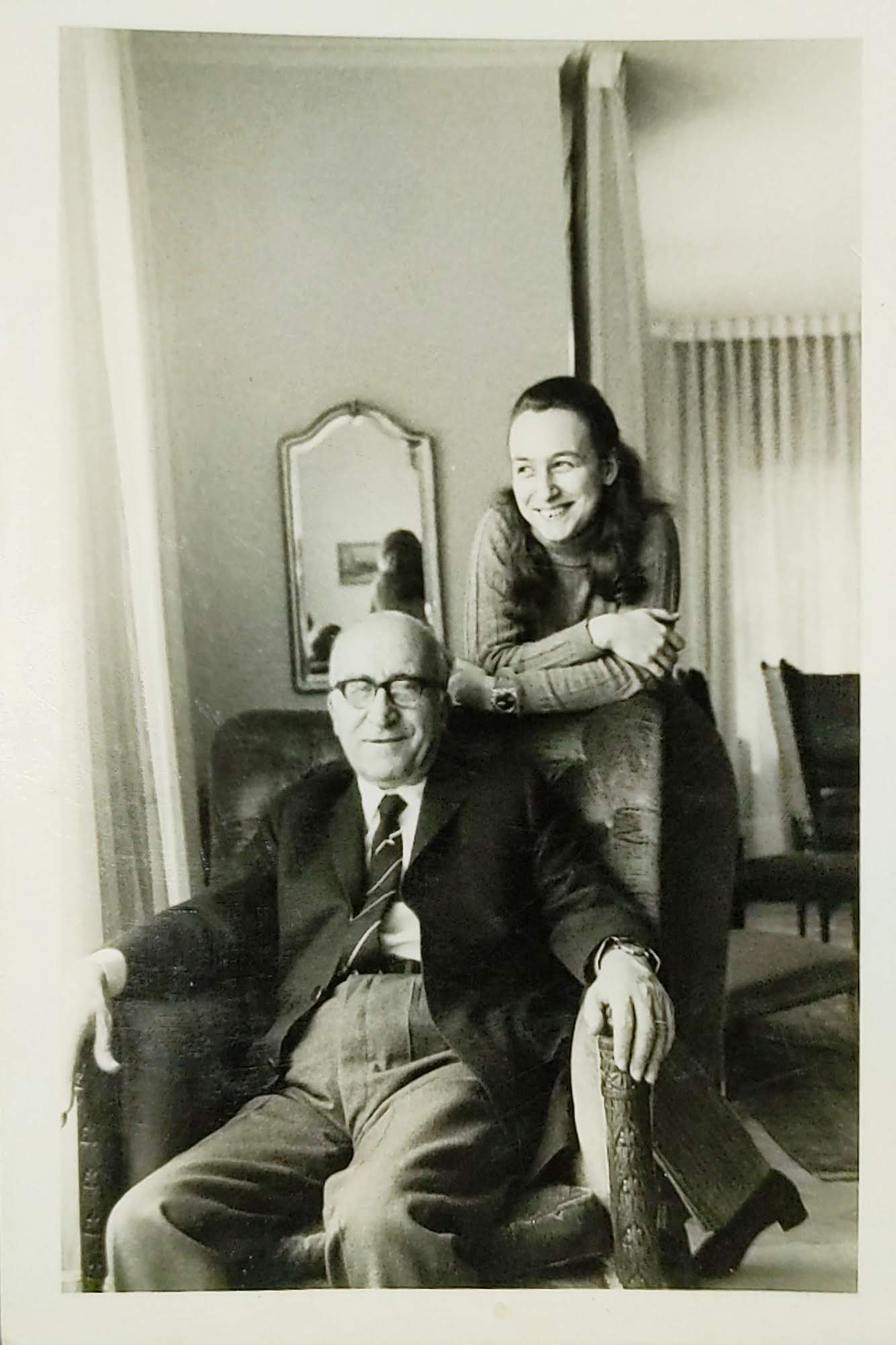

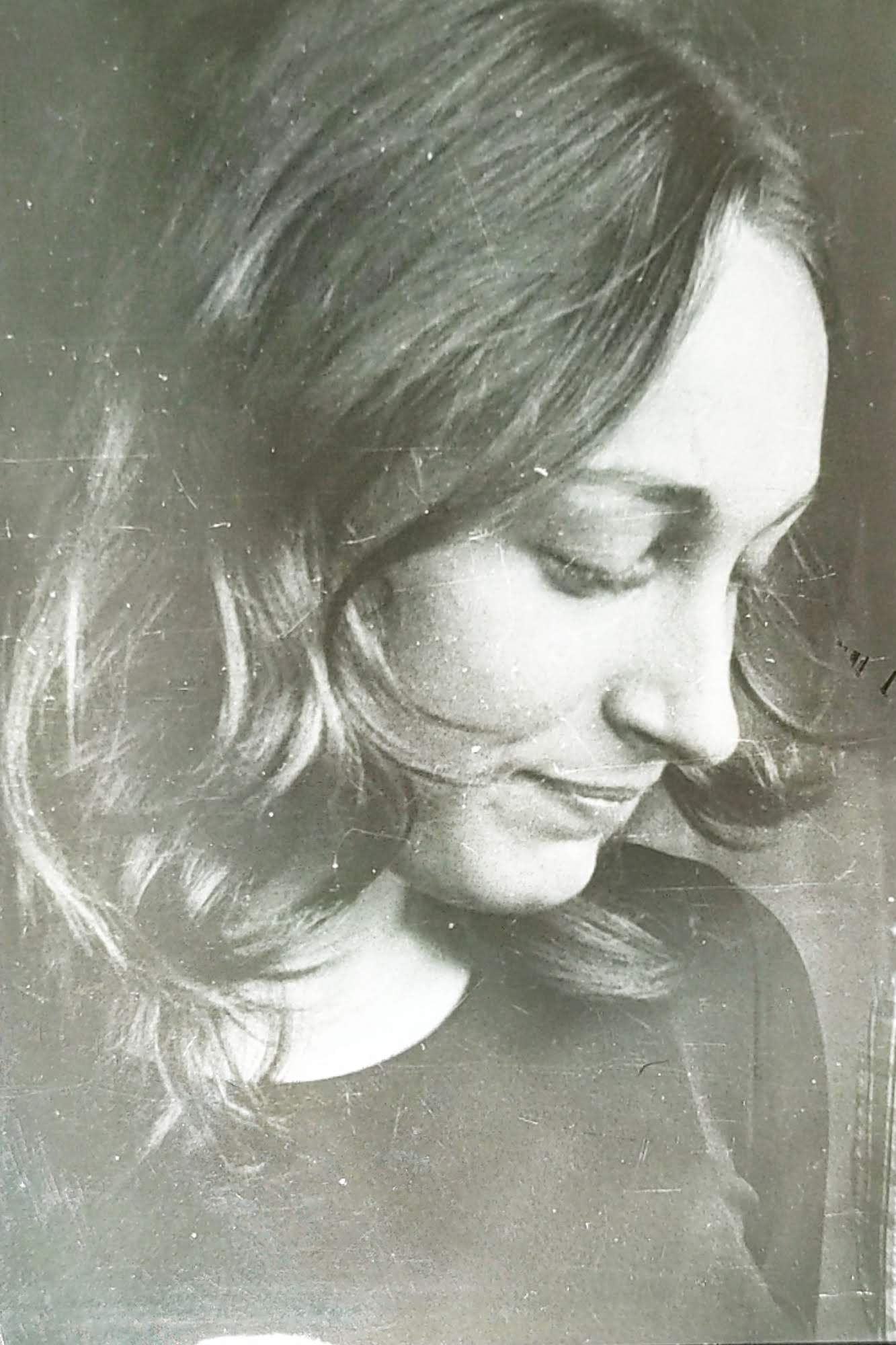

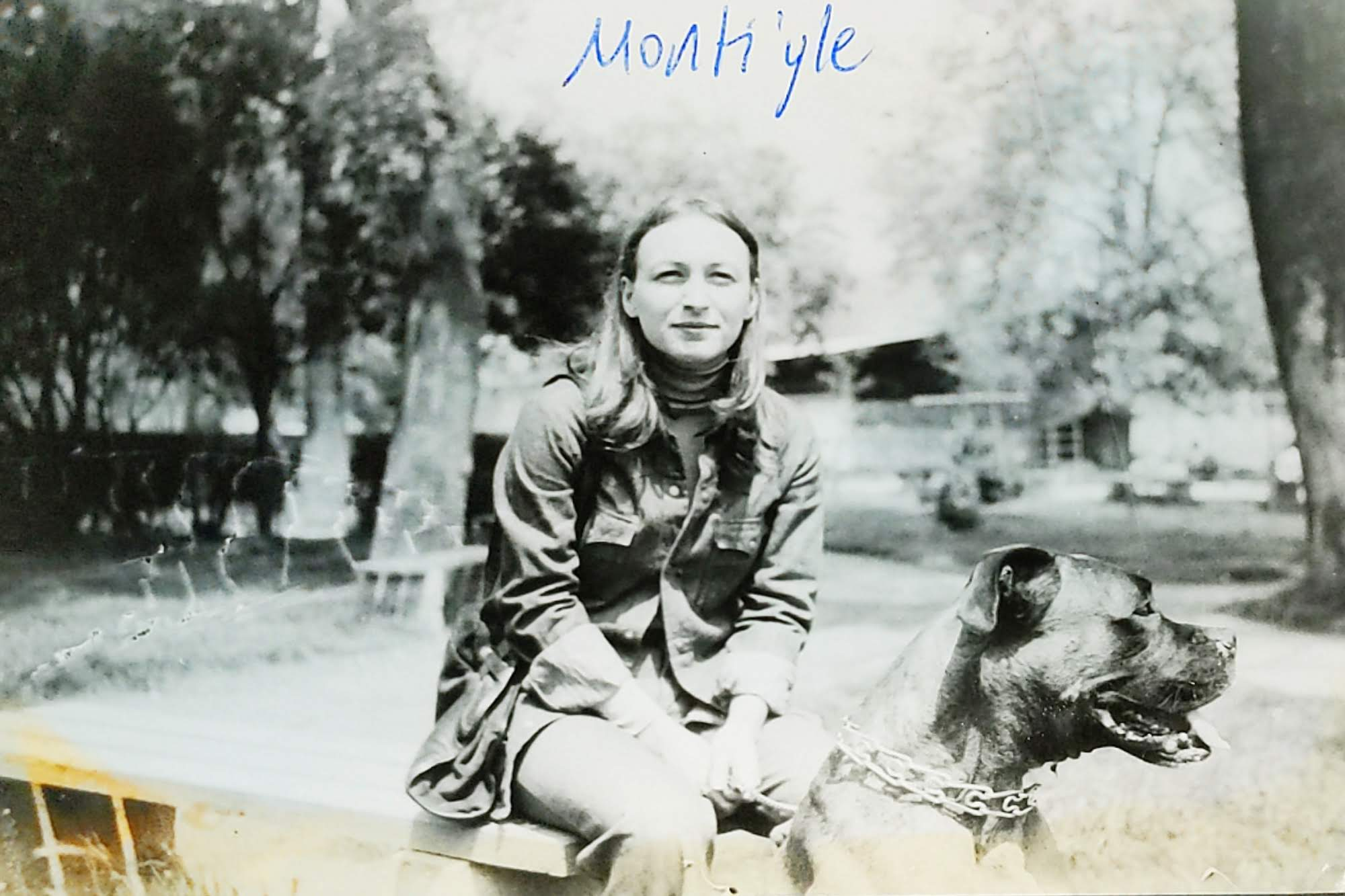

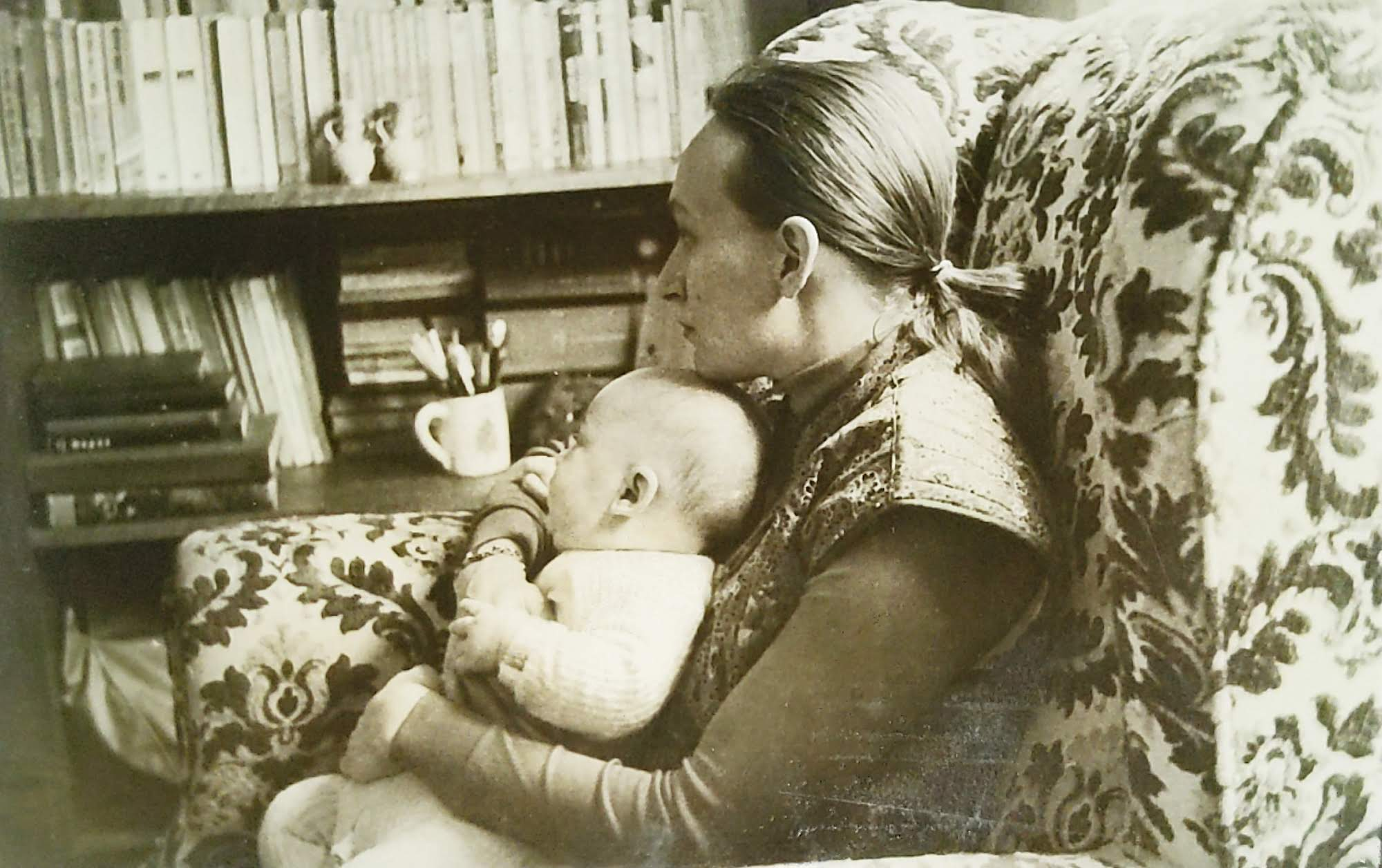

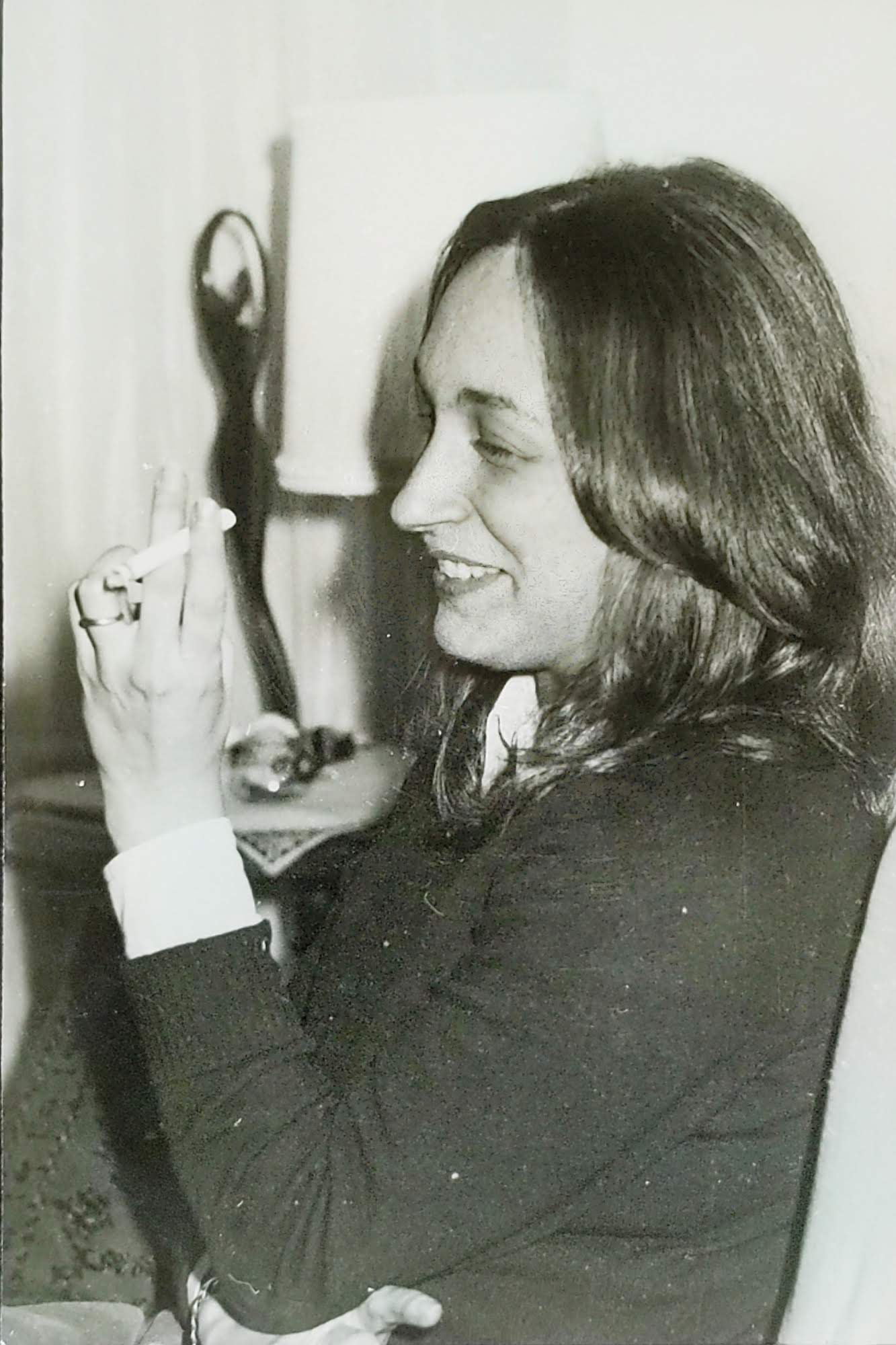

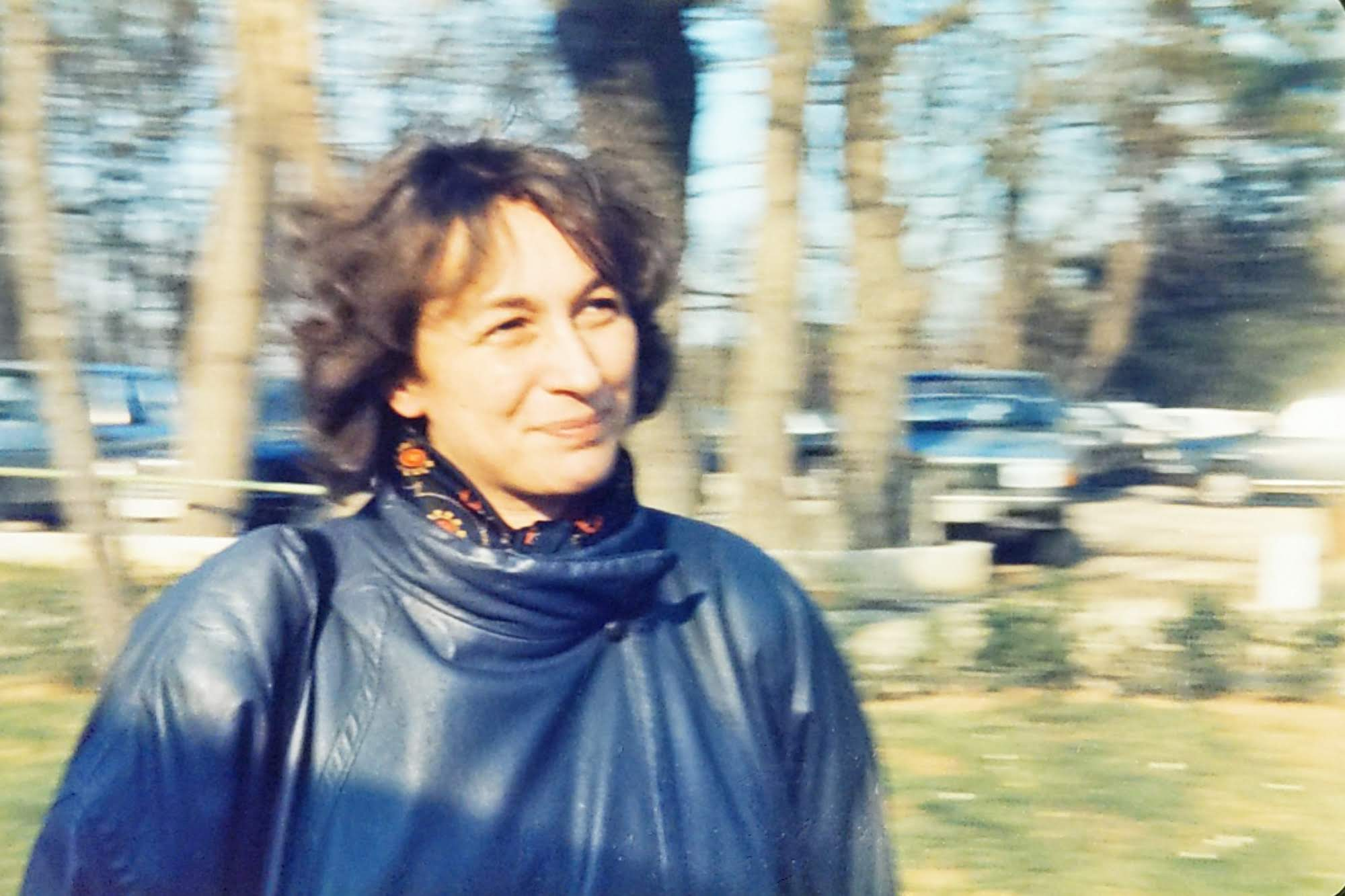

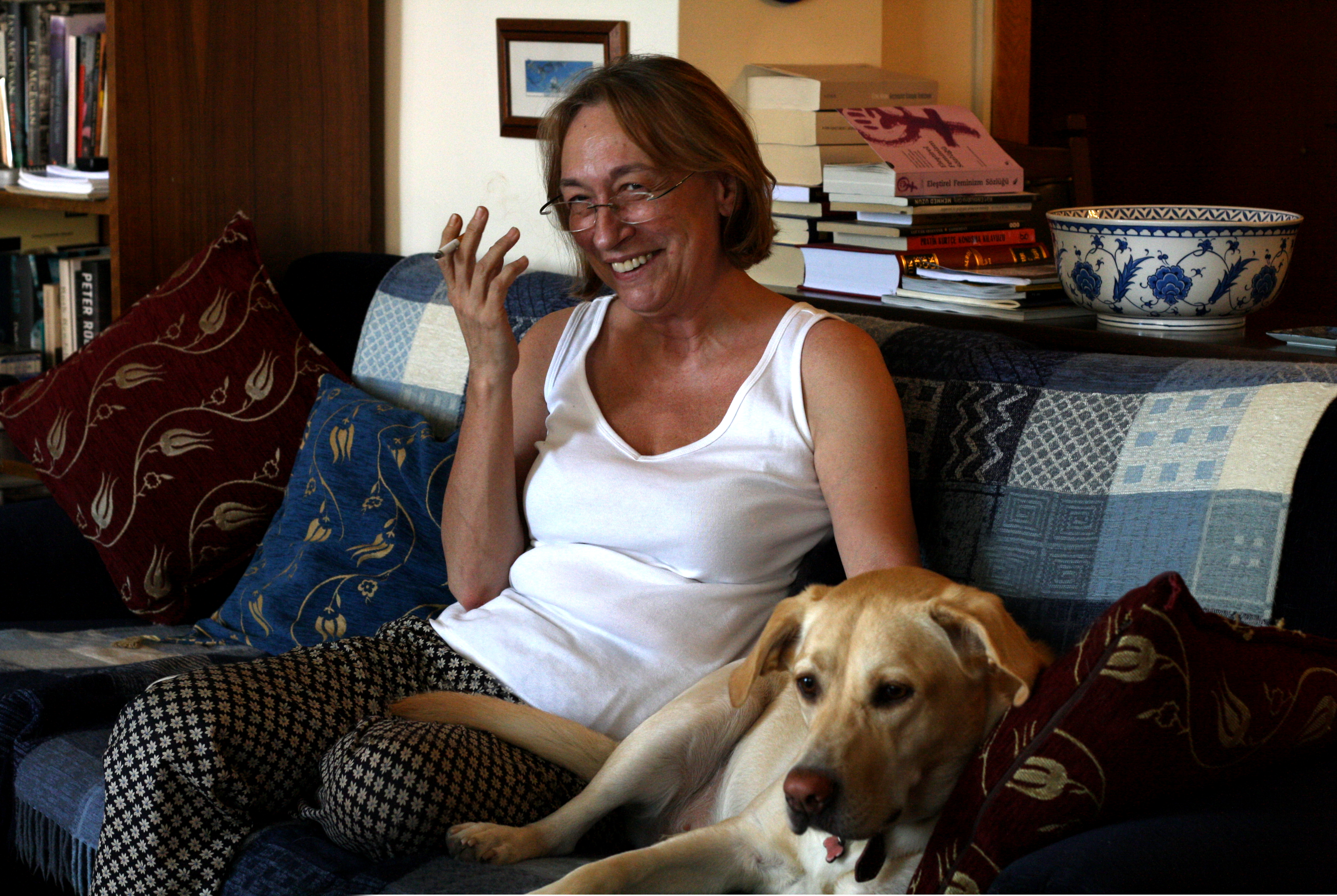

== See also ==
- Peride Celal
