= Zeynep Sultan =

Ottoman princess, Daughter of Ottoman Sultan Ahmed III

- Born: 8 April 1714; Topkapı Palace, Constantinople, Ottoman Empire
- Died: 25 March 1774 (aged 59); Constantinople, Ottoman Empire
- Burial: Zeynep Sultan Mosque, Eminönü, Istanbul
- Spouse: Sinek Mustafa Pasha (m. 1728; died 1764); Melek Mehmed Pasha (m. 1765)
- Issue: First marriage Sultanzade Yüsuf Bey
- Dynasty: Ottoman
- Father: Ahmed III
- Religion: Sunni Islam

Zeynep Asima Sultan (Ottoman Turkish: زینب سلطان; 8 April 1714 – 25 March 1774) was an Ottoman princess, the daughter of Sultan Ahmed III.

== Birth ==
Zeynep Sultan was born on 8 April 1714 at the Topkapı Palace. Her father was Sultan Ahmed III.

== First marriage ==
In 1728, Zeynep Sultan married Küçük Sinek Mustafa Pasha, the nephew of the grand vezir Nevşehirli Damat Ibrahim Pasha, and the second head of the royal stables at the time. The wedding ceremony took place at the Topkapı Palace. On 8 December Zeynep's trousseau was sent to her palace known as Kıbleli Palace and the next day the wedding procession followed. Together, they had a son.

== Second marriage ==
After the death of Mustafa Pasha in 1764, Zeynep Sultan in 1765 married Melek Mehmed Pasha, who had previously served as the grand admiral of the Ottoman fleet, during the reign of her half-brother Mustafa III. Melek Mehmed Pasha twice served as the Admiral of the Fleet and was made grand vizier in 1792.

== Issue ==
By her first marriage, Zeynep had a son:

- Sultanzade Yüsuf Bey (1732 - 1765)

== Charities ==
In 1769, Zeynep Sultan endowed a mosque at Eminönü known as "Ruh-i Sultaniye Mosque". A school and a fountain built near the mosque are also part of the foundation. Today it is called Zeynep Sultan Mosque.

== Death ==
Zeynep Sultan died on 25 March 1774 and was buried in her own mosque located at Eminönü.

== Sources ==
- Sakaoğlu, Necdet (2008). Bu mülkün kadın sultanları: Vâlide sultanlar, hâtunlar, hasekiler, kadınefendiler, sultanefendiler. Oğlak Yayıncılık. ISBN 978-9-753-29623-6.
- Uluçay, Mustafa Çağatay (2011). Padişahların kadınları ve kızları. Ankara: Ötüken. ISBN 978-9-754-37840-5.
