= Zeynep Karahan Uslu =

Turkish politician

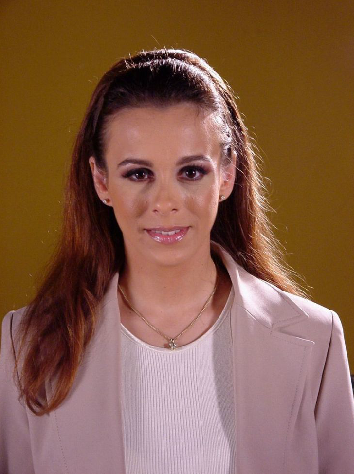
- Uslu in 2012

Personal details
- Born: Zeynep Karahan; July 11, 1969 (age 57) Istanbul, Turkey
- Party: Justice and Development Party
- Education: Istanbul University
- Profession: Academic, politician

Zeynep Karahan Uslu is a Turkish communications scientist, public relations specialist, activist, and politician.

== Academic career ==
After majoring in journalism and public relations, Uslu obtained a master's degree and PhD, in 1992 and 1998 respectively, from the Department of Public Relations and Publicity of the Institute of Social Sciences.

She worked as a faculty member at Istanbul University in the School of Communications (1991-1994) and the Sociology Department of the School of Letters (1994-2002). After serving as Deputy at the Turkish parliament during the 22nd legislative session, she became the founder and president of the Centre for Studies on Turkey (TAM) of Istanbul Aydın University and working as a faculty member of the School of Communications at the same university (2007-2009). In 2010, she was appointed as an associate professor of applied communications. Between 2009 and 2011, she was adviser to the chancellor of TOBB University of Economics and Technology and served as faculty member and chair of the Department of Visual Communication Design at the School of Fine Arts. After serving again as Deputy at the Turkish parliament during the 24th legislative session, she was the first Chair of Public Relations and Advertising at Çankaya University of Ankara, where she currently holds the positions of professor, head of department, and advisor to the chairman of the board of trustees.

Uslu has written, collaborated, and edited books on political communication, sociology of communication, public diplomacy, inter-ethnic communication, women's studies, and cultural heritage. She was a communications consultant for several political parties.

== Politics ==
In 2002, she was elected as Deputy of Istanbul, being the youngest female parliamentarian of the 22nd legislative session. In the same period, she was elected as the first chairperson of the Turkish Group at the Euro-Mediterranean Parliamentary Assembly (EMPA). She was also the spokesperson for the Environment Committee, the deputy chairperson of the Turkey-Pakistan Inter-Parliamentary Friendship Group, a member of the European Parliamentary Forum on Population and Development, and the co-chair of the Turkey-Italy Inter-Parliamentary Cooperation Protocol during the course of the 22nd legislative session of the Turkish parliament.

She was re-elected to parliament during the 24th legislative session as Deputy of Şanlıurfa, being the third female parliamentarian in the city’s history. She was elected as the head of the Turkish delegation to the Parliamentary Assembly of the Union for the Mediterranean(PAUfM). During the same period, she was a member of the Committee on Equal Opportunity for Women and Men of the Turkish parliament and chaired the Subcommittee on Gender Equality in the Media, while serving also as co-chair of Turkey-Italy Inter-Parliamentary Cooperation Protocol.

During her political career, she focused on human rights in the fields of women's issues, environmental policies, children's rights, and social inequalities, including supporting the activities of non-governmental organizations. She has prepared reports and legislative proposals on these issues at the Grand National Assembly of Turkey and contributed to the accession of Turkey to the European Union. After her term as a deputy, Uslu continued to work in non-governmental organizations in the same areas.

Between 2003-2012, she served as the deputy chairperson of public relations of the Justice and Development Party (AK Party) and led the establishment and development of AKİM (AK Party Communication Centre). AKİM was awarded the “Golden Compass” by TÜHİD (Public Relations Association of Turkey), and the AK Party became the first political party to receive an award in the field of communication.

Uslu was elected as a member of the Consultative Committee of the Foreign Relations Department of AK Party, as well as being elected as a member of the Central Decision and Executive Board (MKYK) during the 3rd and 4th General Congress of AK Party. Between 2012-2016, she served as the deputy chairperson of the R&D department and was nominated as the AK Party candidate for Deputy of Aydin during the parliamentary election of 7 June 2015. Between 2016 and 2017, she served as Advisor to the Chairperson of the AK Party. After 2017, she has concentrated on her academic works.

Roles within national and international bodies
• Chairperson of the Board of Trustees of the Yıldız Palace Foundation (2013 – )
• Chairperson of the Expert Committee on Gender Equality of the Turkish National Commission for UNESCO (2018 – )
• Board Member of the Turkish National Commission for UNESCO (2018 – )
• Member of the Consultative Board of the Kenan Yavuz Ethnography Museum (2020 – )
• Member of the Global Distance Education Dissemination and Alternative Education Research Association (2019 – )
• Deputy Chair of the Equal Opportunity Commission of the Standing Committee for the Euro Mediterranean Partnership of Local and Regional Authorities (COPPEM) (2009 – 2016)
• Member of the UniCredit International Advisory Board (2007 – 2009)
• Member of the Italian Academy of Cuisine (Accademia Italiana Della Cucina) (2005 – 2010)
• Member of the international network Parliamentarians for Global Action (PGA) (2011 – )
• Member of the High Consultative Commission of the Turkish Parliamentarian Union (TPB) (2011 – 2016)
• Founding Member of the Turkish Language and Literature Association (2008 – )
• Member of The Parliamentary Network on the World Bank & International Monetary Fund (2005 – 2007)
• Member of the Touring and Automobile Club of Turkey (2007 – )
• Founding Board Member of the Eurasia Sociologists’ Association (2007 – )
• Founding Board Member of the Alumni Association of the School of Communication of Istanbul University (2007 – )
• Member of the Nonviolent Radical Party (2005 – )
• Member of the Board of Trustees of Istanbul Aydın University (2003 – 2006)
• Member of the Anatolian Club (2002 – )
• Member of the International Communication Association (ICA) (2001 – )
• Member of the Sociological Association (2000 – )
• Founding Member of the Hazar Education, Culture and Solidarity Association (1993 – )
• Member of the Culture and Solidarity Association of Sanliurfa (1990 – )

== Personal life ==
Uslu is the daughter of Abdulkadir Karahan, who is known for his studies on Turkology and theology, and Süreyya Karahan, who was a mathematics teacher.

== Publications ==
• Göbeklitepe: History of Humankind Rewritten. Zeynep Karahan Uslu, Yıldız Sarayı, and Vakfı Yayınları, Istanbul, 2019. (Turkish-English, Italian-English)
• Broken grounds 2: Intercultural communication, multiculturalism. Zeynep Karahan Uslu, Can Bilgili, and Beta Yayınları, Istanbul, 2012. (English-Turkish)
• Bilinç Endüstrisinin İktidar ve Siyaset Pratikleri, Zeynep Karahan Uslu, Can Bilgili, and Beta Yayınları, Istanbul, 2009.
• Televizyon ve Kadın, Zeynep Karahan Uslu and Alfa Yayınları, Istanbul, 2000.

== Awards ==
• “Successful Women” Award, Federation of Public Employees Associations, 2015
• “Deputy of the Year” Award, Vision 2023 in Politics and Economy Magazine, 2013
• “Deputy of the Year” Award, Turkish Youth Council, 2013
• “Businesswoman Active in Civil Society, Business World, Politics” Award, ANGİAD (Young Entrepreneurs Association of Ankara), 2012
• Order of the Star of Italian Solidarity, 2007
• “Deputy of the Year” Award, Federation of Public Employees Associations, 2007
• “May 19th” Youth Award, Habitat and Local Agenda 21 Youth Association, 2004
• “Deputy of the Year” Award, Politics, Siyaset Magazine, 2004

== External linksOfficial website ==
- Official website (Archived)
