= Zeynep Sultan Mosque =

Mosque in Istanbul, Turkey

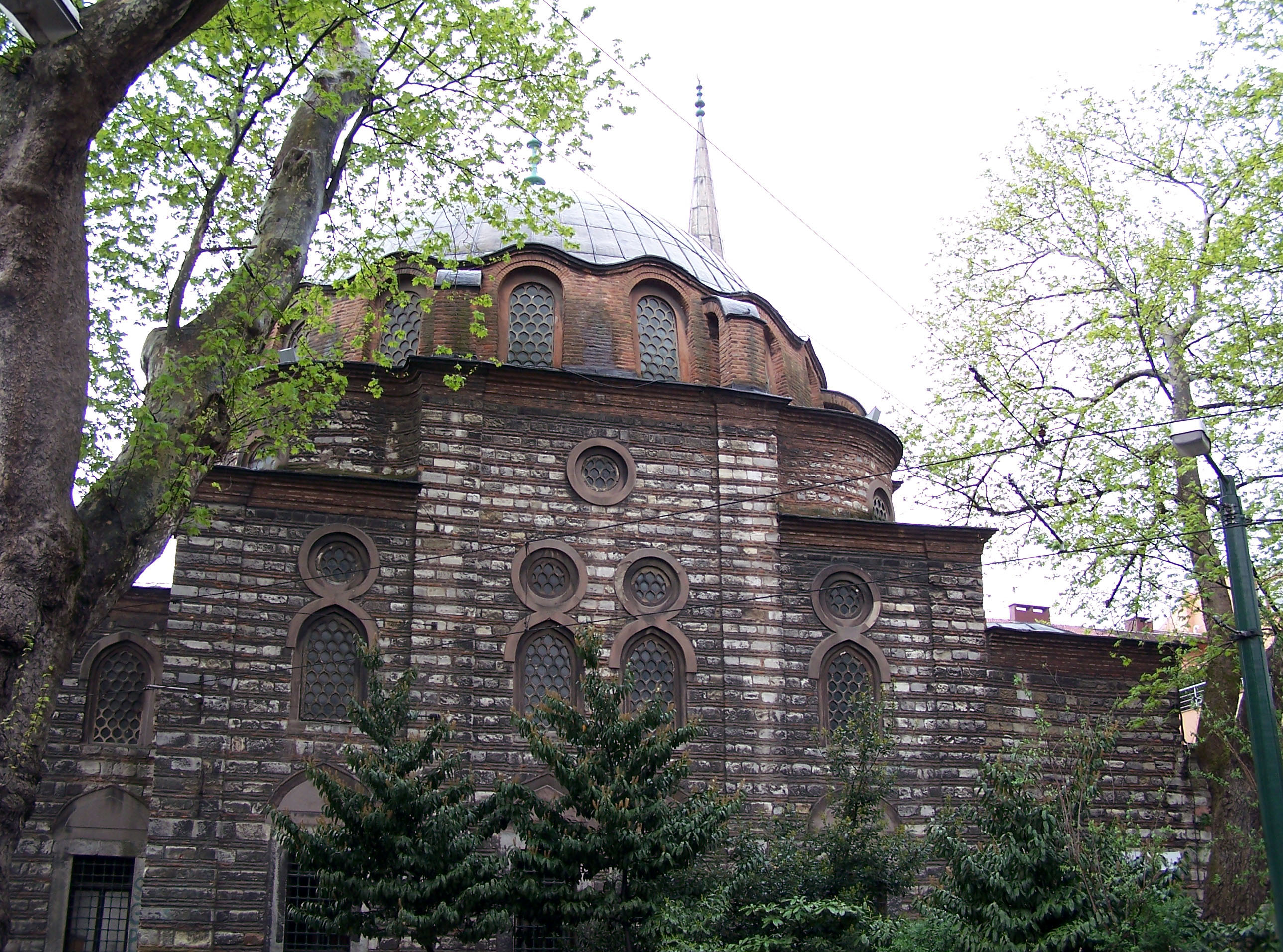

- Location in the Fatih district of Istanbul

Religion
- Affiliation: Sunni Islam

Location
- Location: Istanbul, Turkey
- Coordinates: 41°0′34.92″N 28°58′44.40″E

Architecture
- Architect: Mehmet Tahir Ağa
- Type: Mosque
- Style: Islamic, Ottoman architecture
- Completed: 1769
- Minaret: 1

The Zeynep Sultan Mosque (Turkish: Zeynep Sultan Camii) is a mosque in Istanbul, Turkey. It was built in 1769 by Ayazma Mosque's architect Mehmet Tahir Ağa for Ahmed III's daughter Zeynep Sultan. It evokes Byzantine churches because of its architectural style and materials that were used in its construction.

== History ==
The mosque is on Alemdar Caddesi (Street) in Istanbul, across the street from Gülhane Park, not far from the Hagia Sophia, and visible from the tram that circulates the city. In the back side of the mosque, there is a building, which was once used as mektep and now being used as primary school. The part once used as the sebil, also known as Hamidiye Fountain (Turkish: Hamidiye Çeşmesi) is now closed. In front of the mosque, there is a fountain, which was actually part of Abdul-Hamid I's külliye. The fountain was carried here in 1920s when 4. Vakıf Han's construction in Eminönü. The "Osmanlı Araştırmaları Vakfı" (English: Foundation for Research on the Ottoman Empire is above the mosque.

Ottoman military hero Alemdar Mustafa Pasha's grave is in hazîre of the mosque and due to road construction Zeynep Sultan's corpse in the cellar is waiting for the time of her new tomb's construction. The grave of Melek Mehmet Pasha (in office 1792-1794), who was Selim III's Grand Vizier and Zeynep Sultan's second husband, is also in the hazîre of the mosque. From her first Marriage she got the son Mahmud Dramali Pasha.

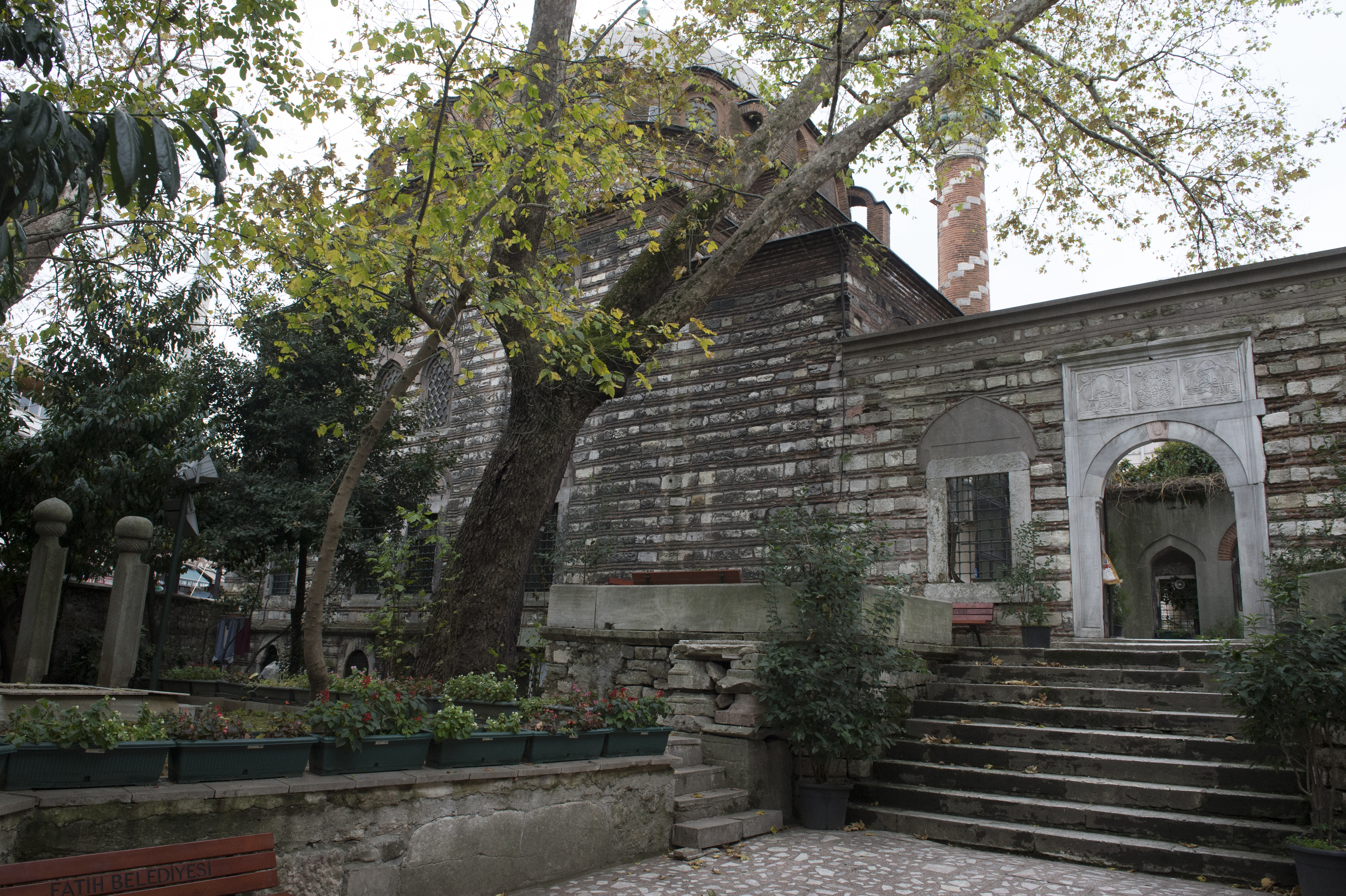
Zeynep Sultan Mosque entrance

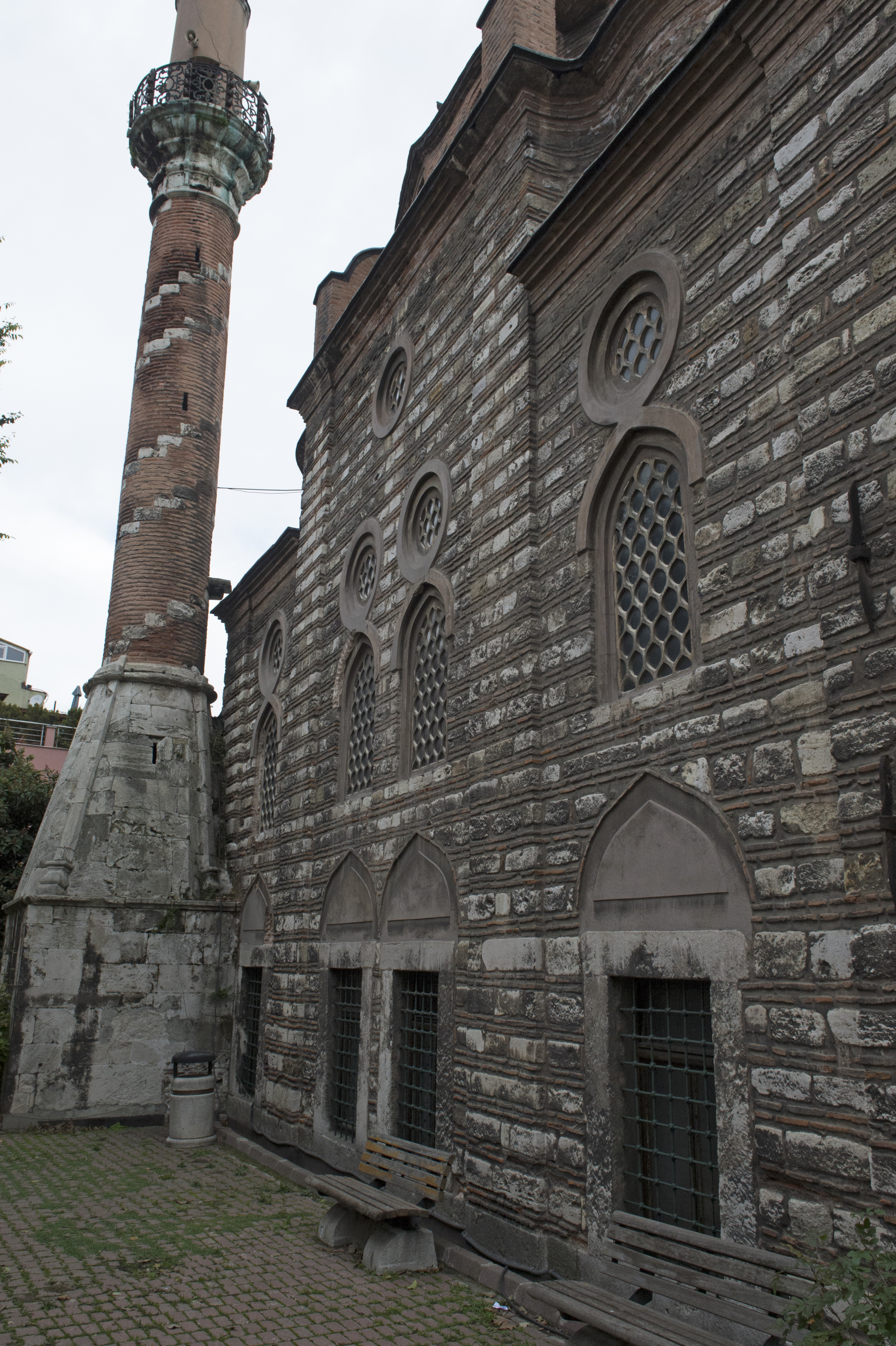
Zeynep Sultan Mosque side and minaret

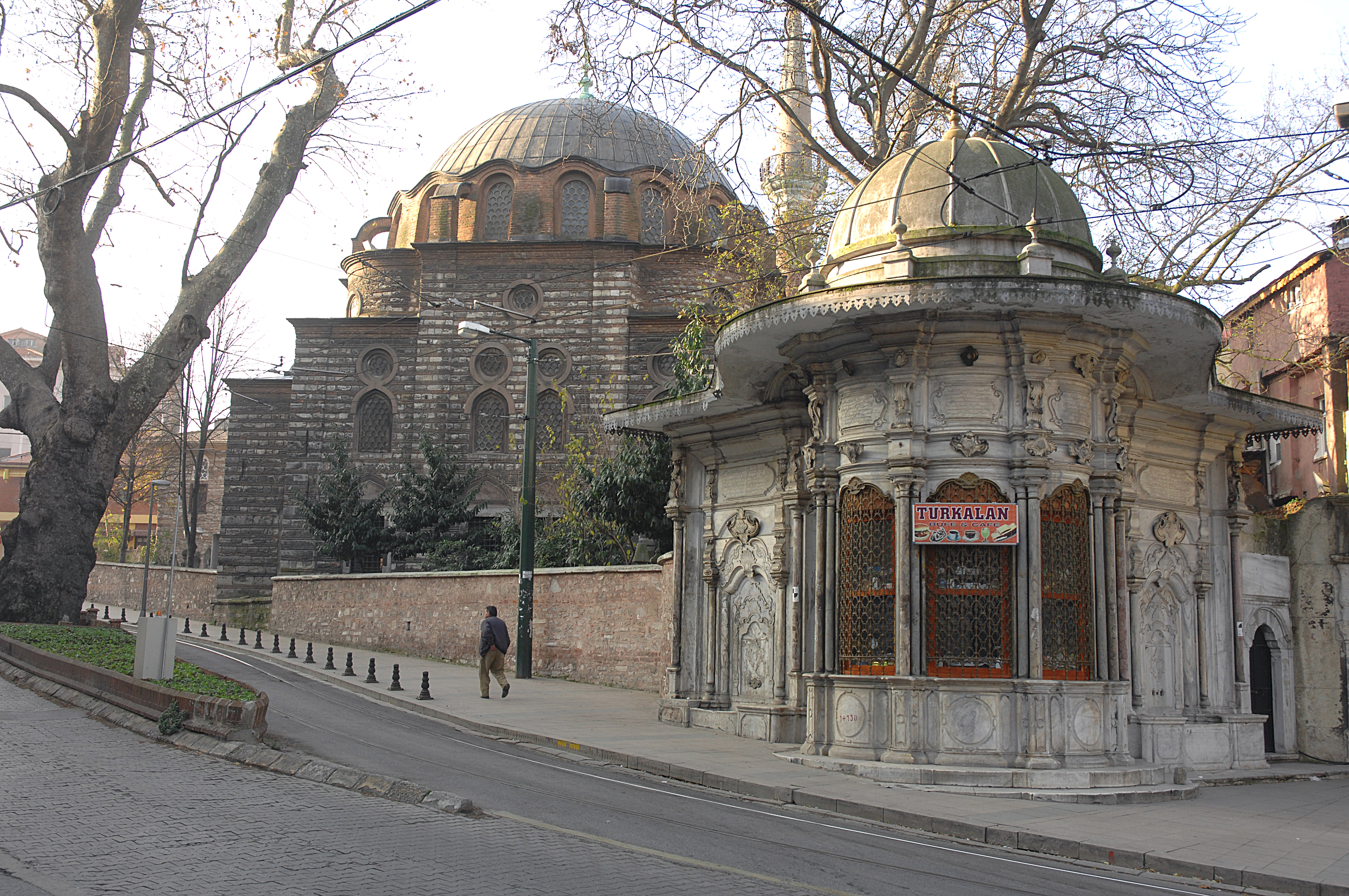
Zeynep Sultan mosque and sebil

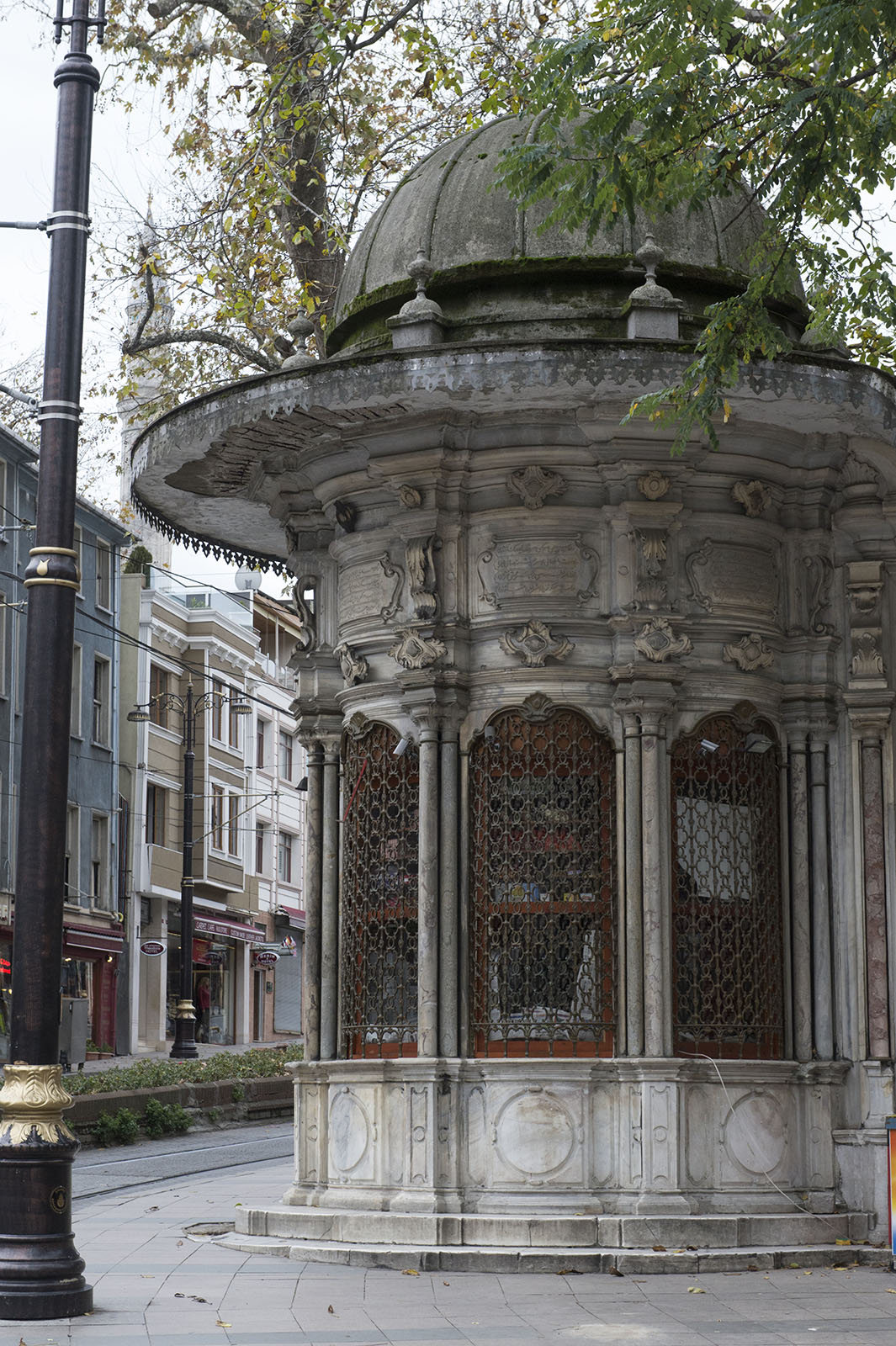
Zeynep Sultan Mosque sebil nearby

== See also ==
- Ottoman architecture
