= Avshalom Feinberg =

Jewish spy and martyr (1889–1917)

Dr. Avshalom Feinberg
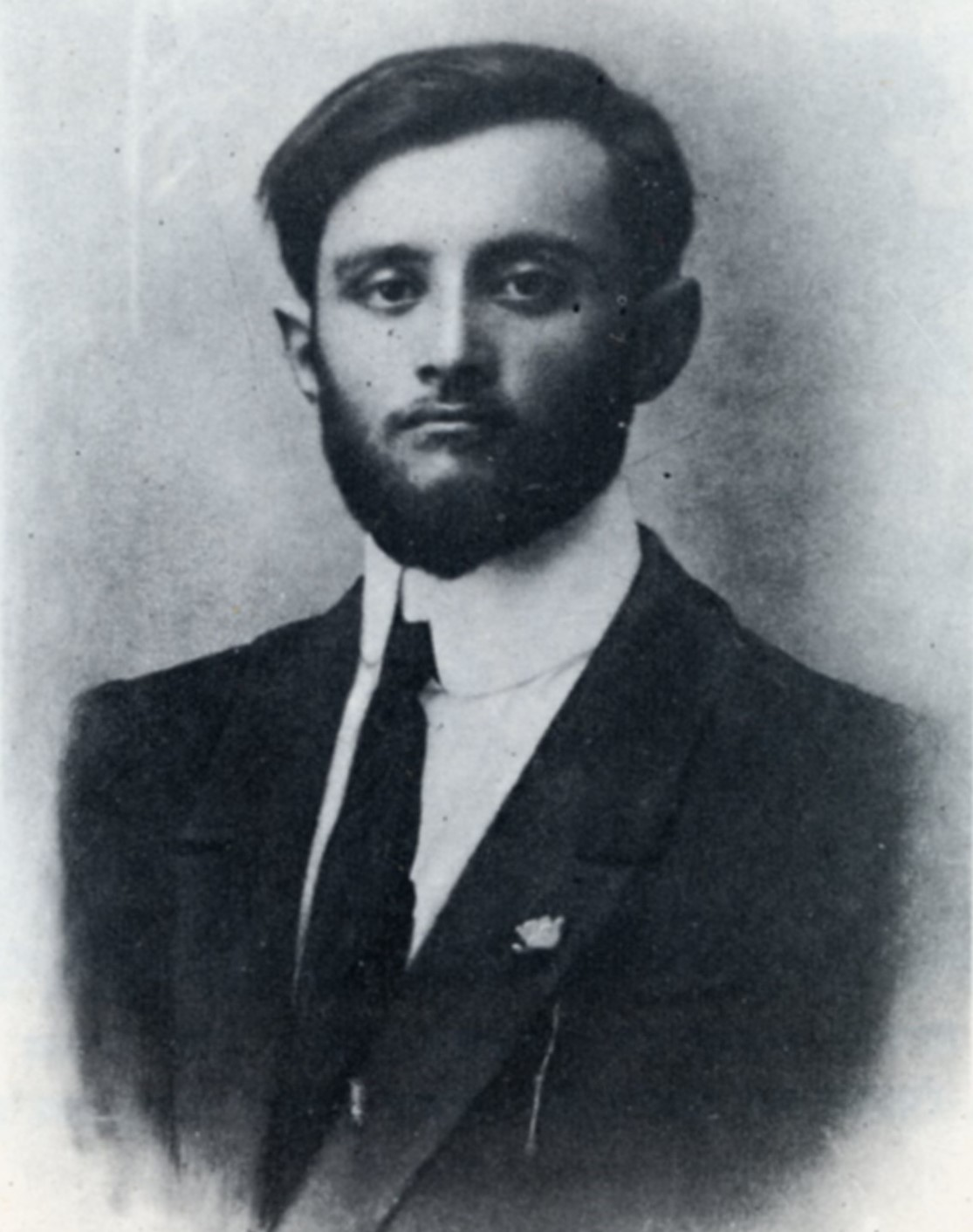
- Avshalom Feinberg in 1915
- Born: 23 October 1889; Gedera, Ottoman Empire, (now Israel)
- Died: 20 January 1917 (aged 27); Near Rafah, Ottoman Empire, (now Gaza Strip)
- Cause of death: Killed in action
- Resting place: Mount Herzl, Jerusalem, Israel; 31°46′27.3″N 35°10′47.4″E
- Citizenship: Ottoman Empire
- Education: Alliance Israélite Universelle, Paris
- Occupations: Spy, agriculturalist
- Organization: NILI
- Known for: Leading figure of the NILI spy network
- Partner: Sarah Aaronsohn
- Parent(s): Israel Feinberg (father), Fanny Belkind (mother)
- Relatives: Yehoshua Hankin (uncle)
- Awards: Commemorated at the Mount Herzl cemetery

Avshalom Feinberg (Hebrew: אבשלום פיינברג, 23 October 1889 – 20 January 1917) was one of the leaders of Nili, a Jewish spy network in Palestine that helped the British fight the Ottoman Empire during World War I. He was killed during a mission for the organization while attempting to cross the Ottoman-British front line with Yosef Lishansky, aiming to reconnect with British forces in the Sinai Peninsula for intelligence exchange between them and NILI.

== Early life ==
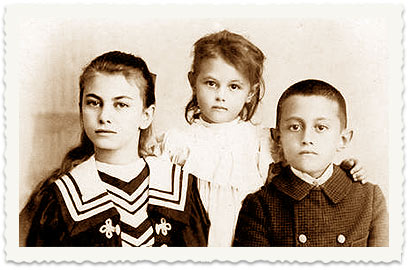
From left to right: Shoshana, Zilla and Avshalom Feinberg in 1898

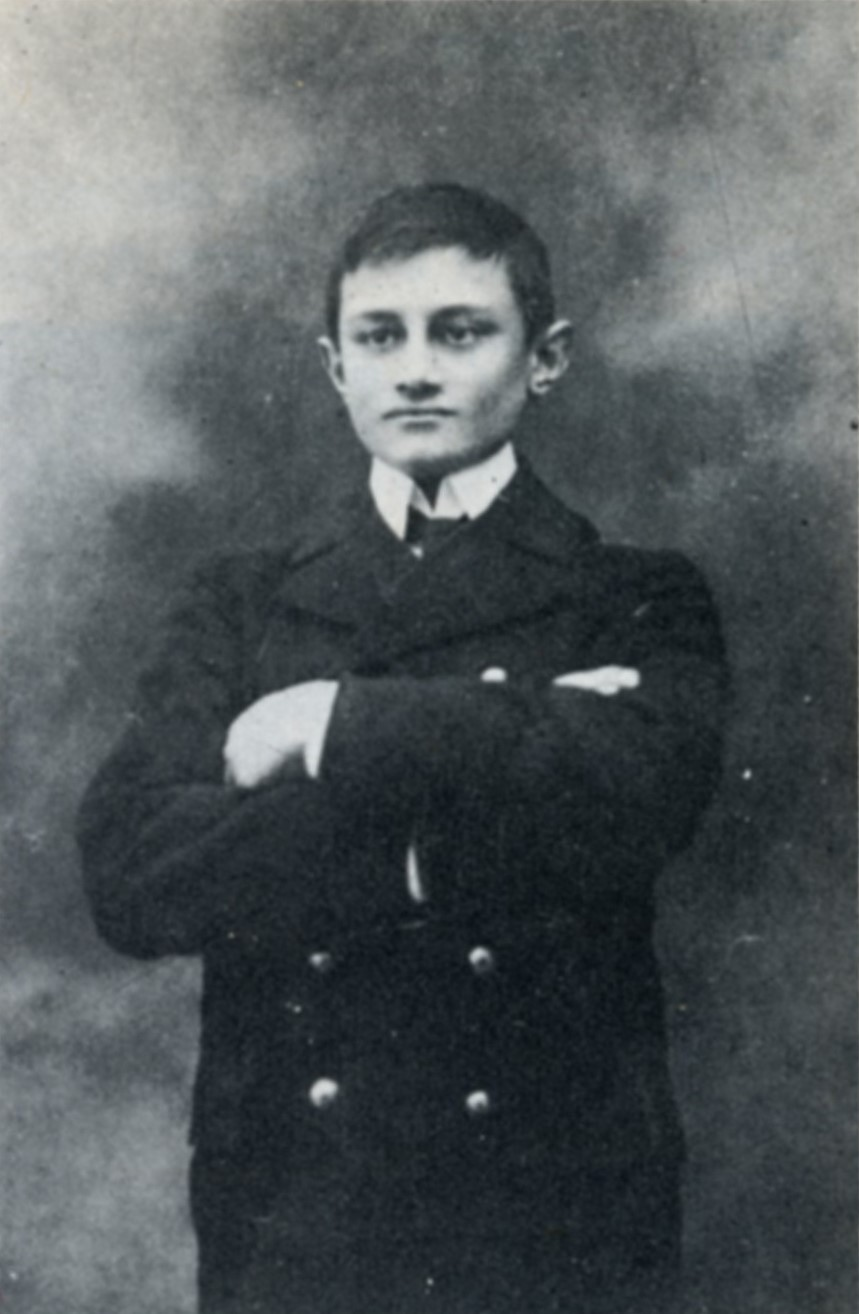
Avshalom Feinberg in 1906

Avshalom Feinberg was born in Gedera to Bilu pioneers Fanny (née Belkind) and Israel Feinberg. When he was around two years old, his family moved to Jaffa, following a conflict his father had with the Arab inhabitants of the village of Qatra, near Gedera. The young Avshalom was educated by his grandfather, Meir Belkind, a devout Torah scholar and enthusiast of the Bible. Later, his father sent him to a kuttab, where he studied Arabic and the Quran. After completing his studies there, Feinberg continued his education at the school run by the Alliance Israélite Universelle organization in Jaffa.

During that time, his father, Israel Feinberg, was involved in draining and cultivating the Hadera swamps, which were purchased by his uncle, Yehoshua Hankin. For several years, Israel lived alone in Hadera while his family resided in Jaffa. Eventually, in 1898, the entire family moved to the Feinberg House in Hadera, which Israel built. Two years later, the Feinberg family returned to Jaffa and then moved to Jerusalem.

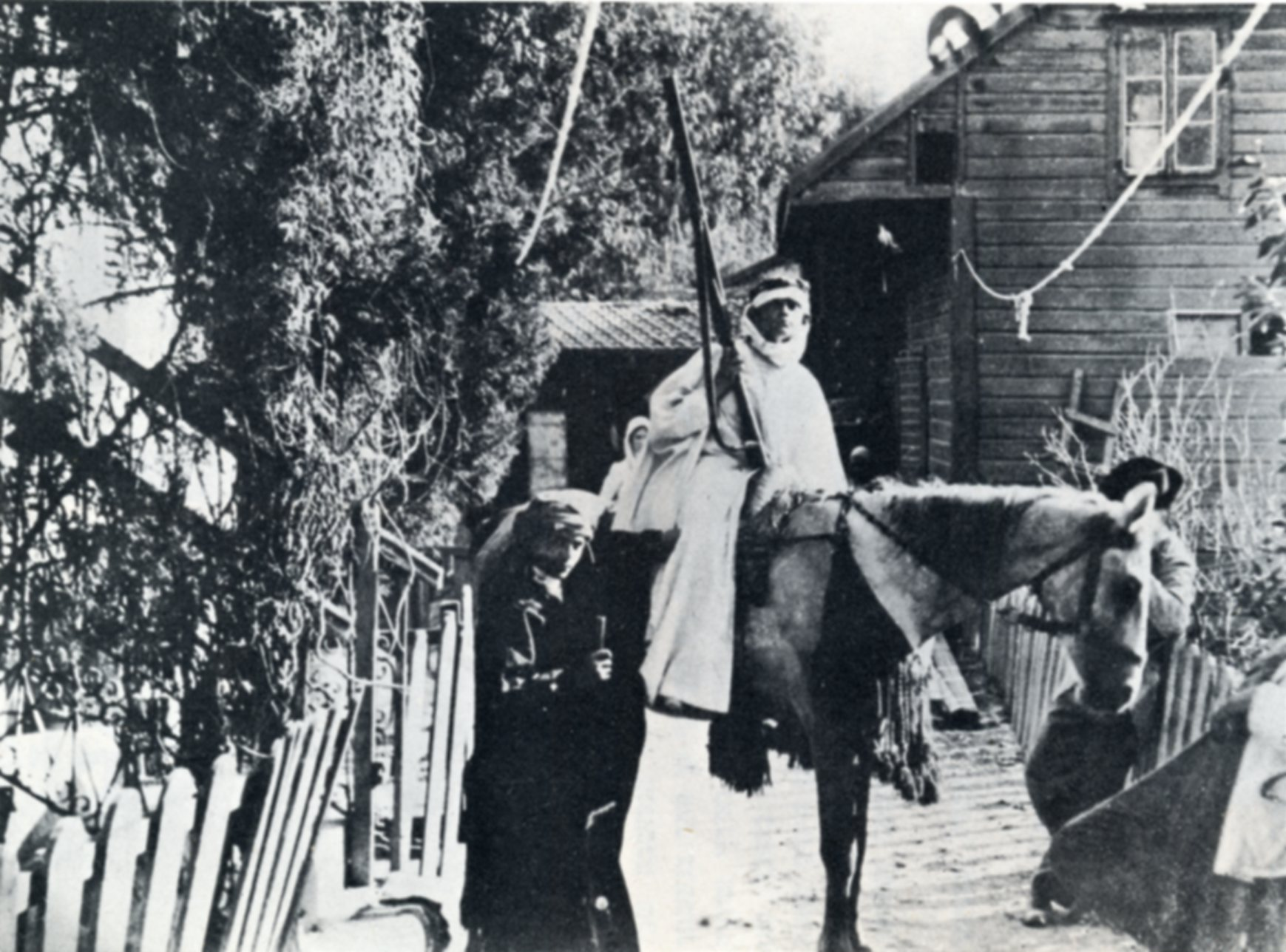
Avshalom (on the horse) with Eitan Belkind, Rishon LeZion, 1903 (Passover 5663).

At the age of twelve, Avshalom, along with other youths, founded a society called "Carriers of the Zion Flag," aiming to establish "a free Land of Israel". At fourteen and a half, it was decided to send Avshalom to Paris, as there was no proper high school in Ottoman Palestine at the time, and due to health issues. In the summer of 1904, he embarked on a tour of the settlements in Ottoman Palestine to mourn the death of Theodor Herzl. During the journey, Feinberg caught a cold, fell ill, and it was believed that a stay in Europe would help his health.

From 1904 to 1906, Feinberg studied in Paris, at the high school of the Alliance Israélite Universelle. In France, he absorbed its culture and befriended French intellectuals, especially the Catholic philosopher Jacques Maritain and the poet Charles Péguy, both of whom foresaw a promising future for him in French literature and poetry.

After returning to Ottoman Palestine, Feinberg went down to Egypt and worked there as a clerk. Boredom during his stay in Egypt and neuralgia (nerve inflammation) led him to travel to Switzerland, where he lived until 1909. He then returned to Paris, attempting to enroll at the National School of Agriculture but failed. He returned to Ottoman Palestine and, together with his parents, settled again in the Feinberg House in Hadera. In 1910, the Aaronsohn Agricultural Experiment Station was established in Atlit by Aaron Aaronsohn, and Feinberg began working there as his assistant. A close friendship developed between Aaronsohn and Feinberg, despite a thirteen-year age difference. Avshalom also formed close bonds with Aaronsohn's family, befriending Alexander Aaronsohn and Sarah Aaronsohn, and eventually becoming engaged, it seems, to Rebecca Aaronsohn. There were even rumors of a romance between him and Sarah Aaronsohn. In 1913, when the Gideonites society was founded by Alexander Aaronsohn, Feinberg was the only member who was not from Zikhron Ya'akov.

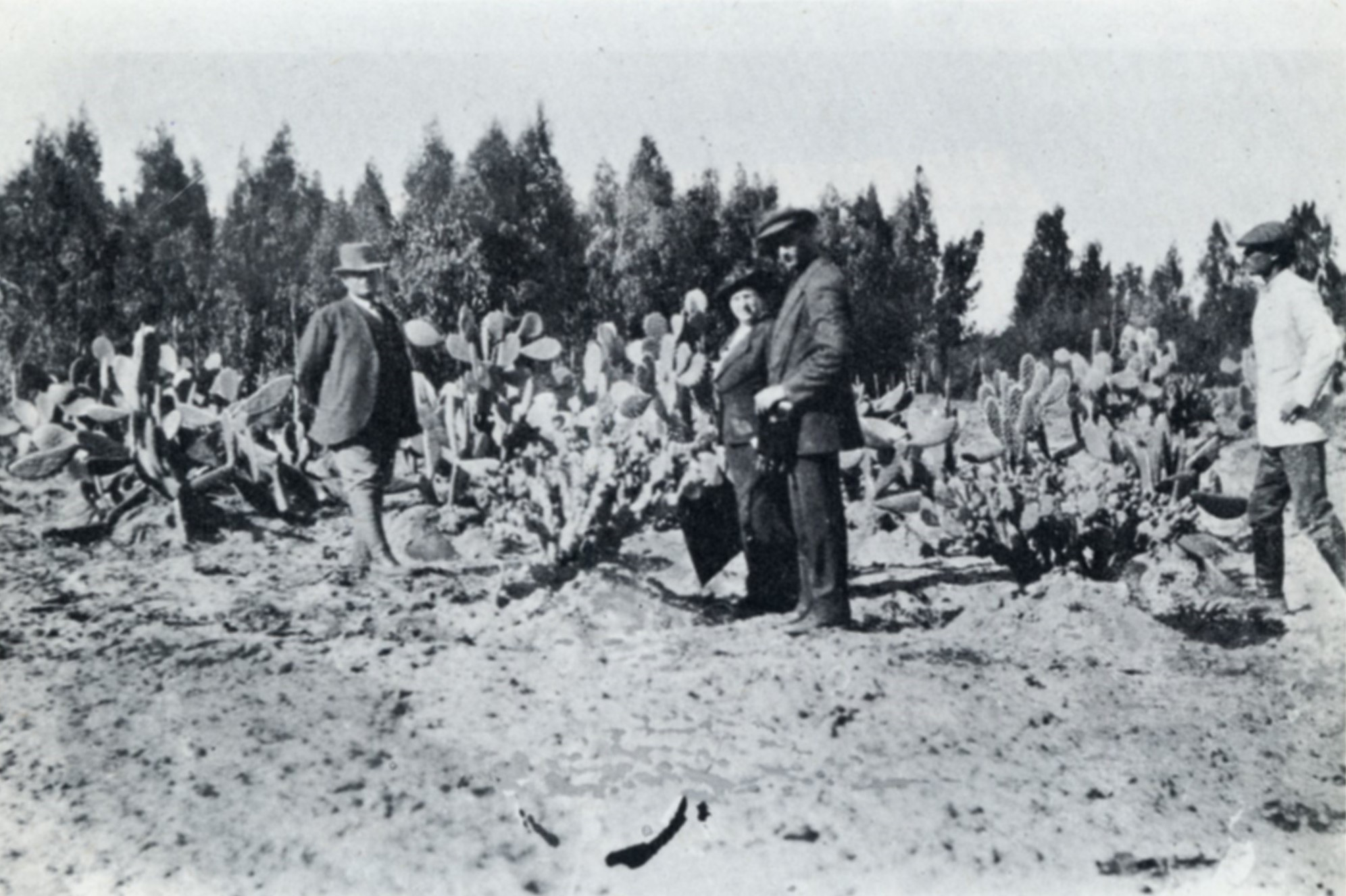
Avshalom Feinberg with Mrs. Rosewald from New York and Aaron Aaronsohn (wearing a hat) at the experiment station in Hadera (1913)

== NILI activities ==
=== Background ===
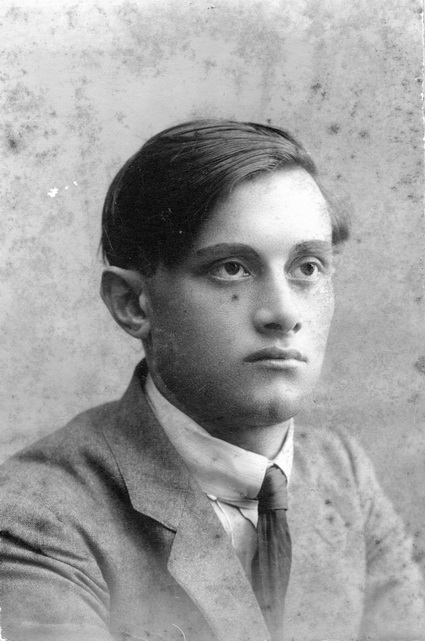
Avshalom Feinberg in 1913

Feinberg, a Jew with strong nationalist feelings, harbored a deep hatred for the Ottoman Empire, which he viewed as corrupt while ruling the Ottoman Palestine before World War I. As early as 1909, he wrote to his uncle, Mendel Hankin, about the Young Turks Revolution:

"...In Turkey, a revolution does not unfold that brings liberty and justice to the peoples. It is a revolution led by a ruling nation, the Turkish nation, which will crush other peoples. Surely you understand that the revolution does not appeal to me, that I find the Turks repulsive, and that this alone, the fact that Palestine is in their hands, seems a sufficient reason. I want a weak, insignificant, leprous Turkish nation as it has been until now... We Jews can only work against Turkey, with whatever means necessary. And all those who think that we can align with them and rise with them are only deceiving themselves... I am a zealot, and I am not ashamed of it. I declare this loudly. To achieve our goal, I would be willing, if it were in my power, to launch two or three wars against the Turks, as well as every plague and calamity, and set them aflame as one lights a candle."

His hatred for the Turks and his belief that the Jewish community in Ottoman Palestine should work to remove the Ottomans only grew over time, especially after the outbreak of World War I and the "Hadera affair", when, in October 1914, a group of young people from Hadera, including Feinberg, went on a night hike along the coast. Using flashlights to light their way, they were mistaken by some Bedouins as signaling to British ships. The Bedouins reported them to the Turks, and in January 1915, thirteen youths from Hadera were arrested on this charge. Feinberg was among the detainees. He was taken to Jerusalem for interrogation, suffering from malaria and murmuring to his friends about the help Jews could provide to the British. The detainees were eventually released, but Avshalom's spirit remained unsettled.

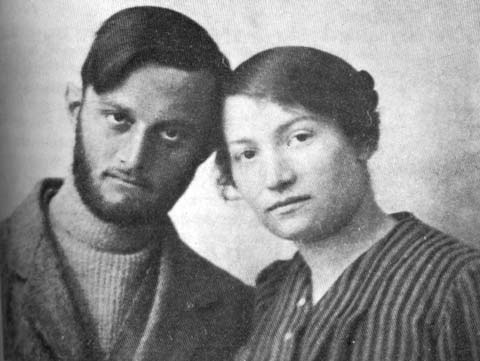
Avshalom Feinberg and Sarah Aaronsohn after his release from prison

The Ottoman persecution of the Jewish community further inflamed his spirit. In a report he sent in October of that year to Henrietta Szold, he wrote about the tyranny of Ottoman officers:

"The officer sent to the location believed, therefore, that his patriotic duty obliged him to suspect everyone, examine everything, enact laws, and behave like a real tyrant, enacting laws and prohibitions typical of Turkish foolishness... My God, when I think of how much we have been enraged, angered, and fumed because of these vile tyrants, who only recently received their officer ranks, I conclude that these petty matters depressed our spirits much more than the great dangers we face when your will drives you to stand in the breach...Due to these daily troubles, our lives became unbearable, hard to bear."

=== Attempts to reach the British ===
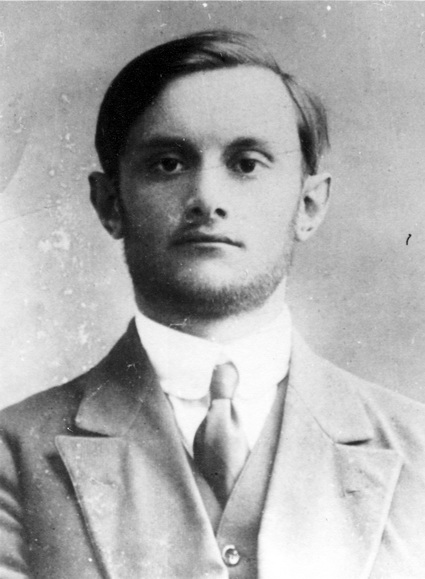
Avshalom in 1915

At the beginning of 1915, Avshalom Feinberg, Aaron and Alexander Aaronsohn decided that they had to take practical steps to end Ottoman rule in Ottoman Palestine by actively aiding the British. Initially, Feinberg proposed stirring a military revolt of the Jewish community with British support. This scenario was something Turkish military commanders greatly feared, as Ahmed Djemal Pasha wrote in his book:

"If the English and the French managed to gain support from the locals and landed two divisions at any point on the Syrian coast (Beirut or Haifa, for instance), we would be in a desperate situation."

This proposal was rejected by Aaron Aaronsohn out of fear of the severe consequences of its failure on the fate of the Yishuv. Instead, they decided to establish an organization that would provide the British with military intelligence. After Alexander Aaronsohn was sent to Egypt and expelled from there, it was decided to send Feinberg, in the hope that he would succeed in establishing contact with the British. On 30 August 1915, he departed aboard the refugee ship "De Moines," with hastily forged documents, and arrived in Egypt a few days later. He managed to establish contact with British intelligence officer Leonard Woolley, who agreed to the idea of forming a spy network. Feinberg was instructed in signaling and coding methods and was also asked to provide specific information about the Turkish army and two British pilots whose aircraft had crashed in the Negev. In October 1915, while in Alexandria, Feinberg wrote a long report to Henrietta Szold in New York, who was responsible for the experiment station in Atlit, detailing the station's activities and the condition of the Jews in the country. This report is likely the first written testimony from Ottoman Palestine about the Armenian genocide in 1915. Under the heading "Disturbing Facts and Rumors," he wrote:

"The Armenians are being murdered en masse... Their men in labor battalions are being shot en masse. They are starved and tortured."

Upon returning to Ottoman Palestine on 8 August, he began traveling around to gather information and compiled a report detailing the state of the Ottoman army in various parts of the country, the condition of the roads, and rumors he had heard. This report contained relatively accurate intelligence, which later turned out to be crucial for the British.

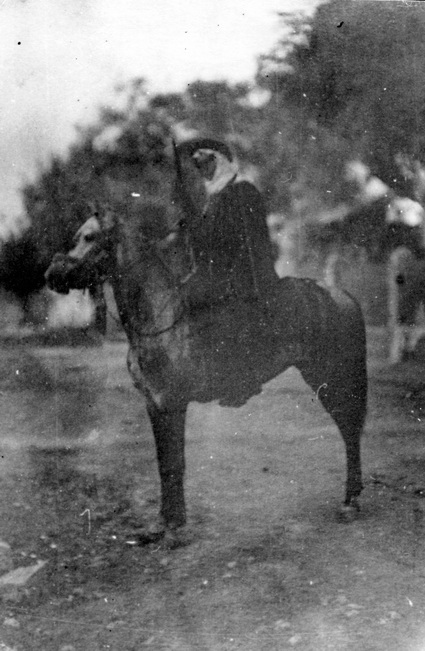
Avshalom Feinberg on a horse in Zikhron Yaakov

On 22 November 1915, Feinberg sent an intelligence report in French from Atlit to Leonard Woolley, the English officer in Cairo overseeing NILI's operations, including a section titled "For Armenia" (Pro Armenia). The report included details of the massacres of Armenians, descriptions of deportation caravans to forced labor camps, and accounts of the trade in young Armenian women:

"I have already ground my teeth to the point of exhaustion; who will be next? As I walked upon the sacred, holy land on the way up to Jerusalem, I asked myself if we are truly living in this time, in 1915—or in the days of Titus or Nebuchadnezzar II? ... I also asked myself if I am only permitted to weep 'for the shattered daughter of my people,' or if Jeremiah shed tears of blood for the Armenians as well?!"

Feinberg waited for a British ship that was supposed to arrive at the beginning of December. This ship did arrive, but signals to it failed for some reason. Avshalom decided, after a few days, to travel to Egypt overland. In his report to Woolley on 6 December 1915, he wrote:

"Mr. Lieutenant, I have decided. I am taking the desert route, to try to reach you despite everything. I do not know if I am allowed to do this or not. On the other hand, the issue of permission has never occupied me much. However, if we assume that the Syrians (the ship's crew) betrayed us—and that seems the most likely—then what might happen... You might think you made a mistake about me... I will not let people think that the first Hebrew youth from the Land of Israel who served you was a scoundrel and a traitor."

Feinberg headed south and was captured in the no-man's land between the Ottoman and British forces. Before being caught, he managed to destroy military documents he was carrying and tear off the Turkish officer insignia he was wearing illegally. He was arrested and imprisoned in Be'er Sheva. During interrogation, he claimed to be there to study the movement of locusts. He received backing from Aaron Aaronsohn, who was officially appointed by the authorities to combat locusts (though he had resigned earlier), and eventually, the investigation yielded nothing, and Feinberg was released. Later, Avshalom went north, attempting to cross the border legally to a neutral country and from there reach Egypt, but encountered difficulties and ultimately returned to the country.

=== His fall in the desert sands ===
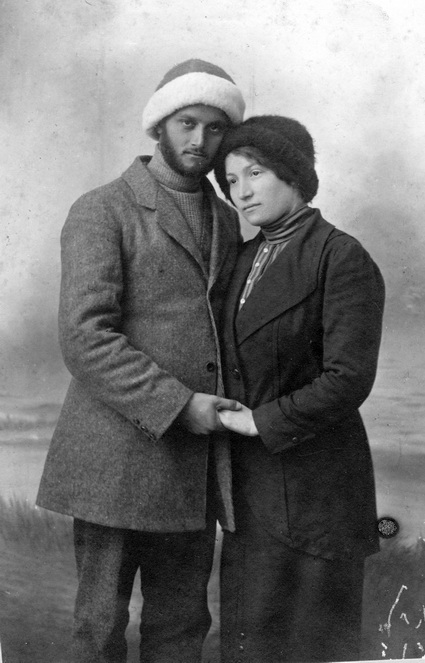
Avshalom with Sarah Aaronsohn, Damascus (1916)

The entire year of 1916 was spent attempting to establish stable contact with British forces in Egypt. Even at the beginning of January 1917, it seemed to Avshalom that there was no such connection. Aaron Aaronsohn, who had left for England earlier, had not been heard from (even though he had already reached Egypt in December 1916), and Feinberg, managing the experiment station in his absence, felt an urgent need to reach Egypt. He set out, en route to the Sinai Peninsula, together with Yosef Lishansky, disguised as Bedouins.

On the night between 19 and 20 January (the eve of Tevet 26, 5677), they lost their way and wandered in circles. It appears they encountered a Bedouin who demanded they accompany him to his tent (in fact, to surrender themselves to the Turks). Lishansky struck him and threatened him with a gun. The young Bedouin, Younes al-Bahbah, went to his tent and reported on Feinberg and Lishansky. Two Turkish gendarmerie officers and about thirty Bedouins set out to capture Feinberg and Lishansky. In the encounter, both Lishansky and Feinberg were injured. Lishansky escaped, but Feinberg, wounded in his thigh and unable to move, shot the Turkish gendarme in response to the demand to drop his weapon. As a result, he was shot in the head and killed, buried in a shallow sand dune, and forgotten.

In June 1967, forty years after Avshalom Feinberg's disappearance, Israeli forces advancing through the Sinai encountered a local Bedouin who claimed to have information of interest. He led them to a site marked by a single date palm, which he referred to as the kubr yehudi—“the Jew’s grave”. Upon digging beneath the tree, the soldiers uncovered Feinberg's remains, intertwined with the tree's roots. In Feinberg's pocket, the dates given to him by Sarah Aaronsohn to eat on his journey had sprouted.

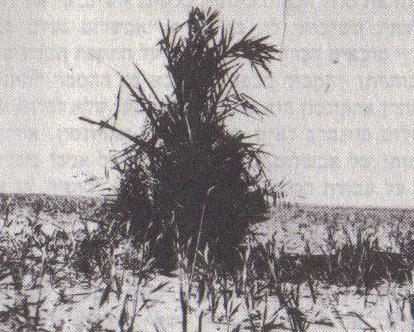
The palm tree that grew over his body, as photographed by Benjamin Ran in early 1931

== Personality ==
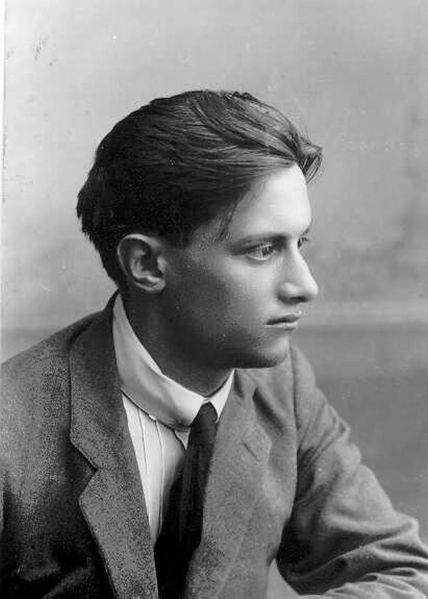
Avshalom as a young man

From his writings, Avshalom appears as a sensitive soul, with strong national and Zionist values. Avshalom spoke several languages (Hebrew, Arabic, French, Yiddish, and English), and he was especially influenced by French culture, in which he lived for several years. His adventurous nature was prominent, as noted by others ("A non-conformist, rebellious type, who does not accept authority and is willing to sacrifice both himself and everyone around him" wrote Mordechai Ben Hillel HaCohen regarding his espionage activities) and by his own admission:

"Know this, Rivka'le, that in two, three, ten years, I will also go to the cold, to the heat, to danger, to the unknown and adventure, and even if I love you then a thousandfold, do not try to stop me because I will push you as if rude, and pass by you. Remember this..."

His love for the land of Palestine and the people of Israel is evident from his writings, as is his tendency for pathos and romanticism:

"...And I know that being a son of a race destined also for fire and sword, it is fitting for me to be prepared every day "to witness the casting of fate." And nothing, ever, will be mine as inheritance, like the people. And since I have inherited a bundle of sorrows, perhaps one day I will pass it on, when it becomes slightly heavier. And I, the weak and the lost, have come this far to save another weak and lost like me, to weave an illusion of strength, like a redeemer and savior. How great, how great the distress!"

"...The past galloped over the mountain. It was like the dying echo of a distant thunder. Here the past comes to life in a hazy murmur and heart-trembling. The past is the most persuasive advocate, its plea draws out thick forests shrouded in mystery, and goatherds crowned with curls like demigods, and sunburnt maidens singing like murmuring springs, and warriors rushing like streams..."

"And when I descended to the plain, thousands of bells rang in my ears, echoing Brand's words to Ibsen... and their slogan is worthy: "A living people, though scattered and small, fortifies itself in its misfortune and rises through its pain; and its dimming gaze, like a fading eye, becomes the gaze of the soaring eagle, intoxicated by the blue, extending its wing mightily to rise against the burning sun, and in its revulsion towards the enemy and the oppressive dark, its weakness becomes strength, and its despair a source of hope; but a people who do not rise to the sublime in its suffering, and does not direct its heart towards a great and noble goal, will not merit salvation; it will die without hope for redemption." Indeed, brother Ibsen!"

== Discovery of his remains ==
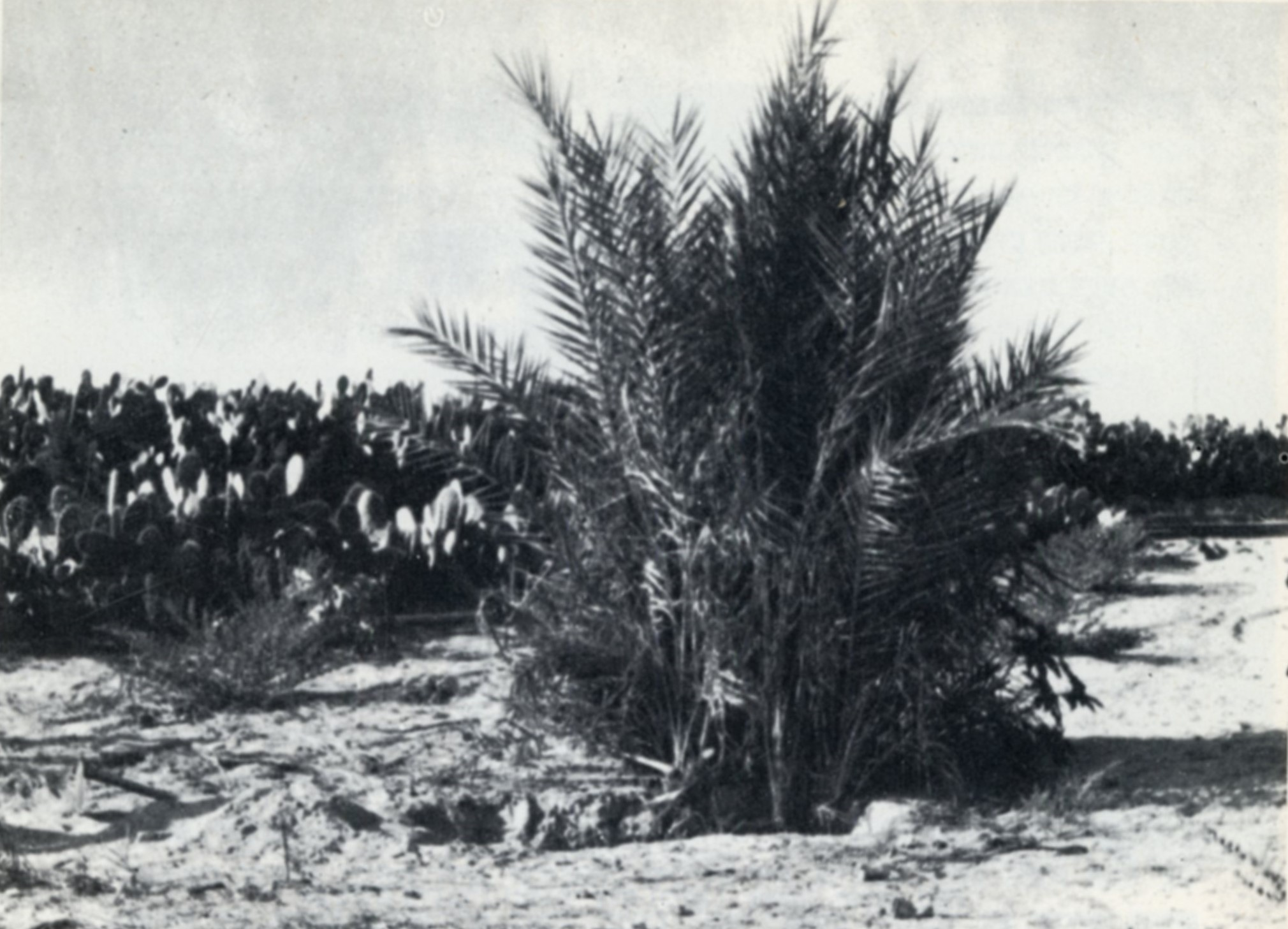
Avshalom's Palm in Rafah sands, photographed during the excavation, October 1967

"We won’t need to die… and when the day comes, the boys will turn into green crowned date palms and next to them their girls will petrify into statues of white marble…"

Feinberg in a letter to Rivka Aaronsohn

After Avshalom Feinberg disappeared in the desert sands near Rafah, numerous attempts were made to locate his body. The first efforts occurred shortly after Feinberg's murder, both by the British and NILI members. In the early 1930s, engineer Benjamin Ran discovered the burial site, but his (correct) identification was dismissed. Only after the Six-Day War, when the IDF captured the area where Feinberg was killed, was the mystery conclusively solved by Dr. Shlomo Ben-Elkana, and the skeleton he found was identified by pathologist Prof. Heinrich Kriplos as that of Avshalom Feinberg. The remains were buried in a military ceremony in the Olei HaGardom section on Mount Herzl. The discovery and transfer of his remains led to the exoneration of Yosef Lishansky from the allegations of murdering Avshalom. This sparked a public debate in Israel about the NILI spy network as a whole, ultimately leading to broader recognition for their actions. As a result, additional NILI members’ remains were eventually moved to Mount Herzl in state ceremonies, and NILI members received official recognition by the State of Israel.

Upon the discovery and relocation of his remains to Mount Herzl, a memorial was erected at the site by the military government, where a straight tree befitting Avshalom's character was planted. Each year, on 20 January, the day of his murder, a memorial service was held until the area was evacuated by the IDF.

== Legacy and commemoration ==
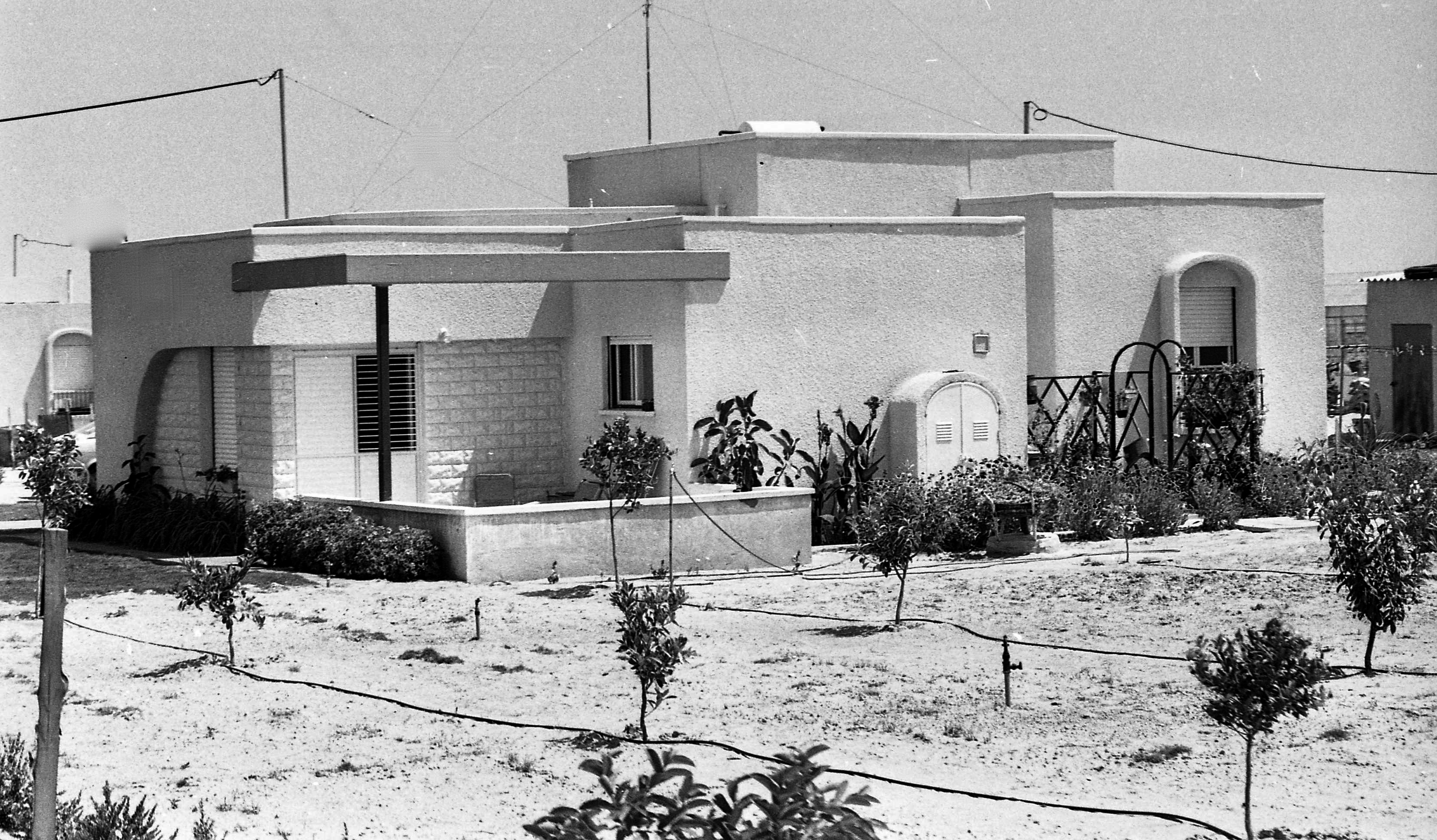
A house in Dekel (1983)

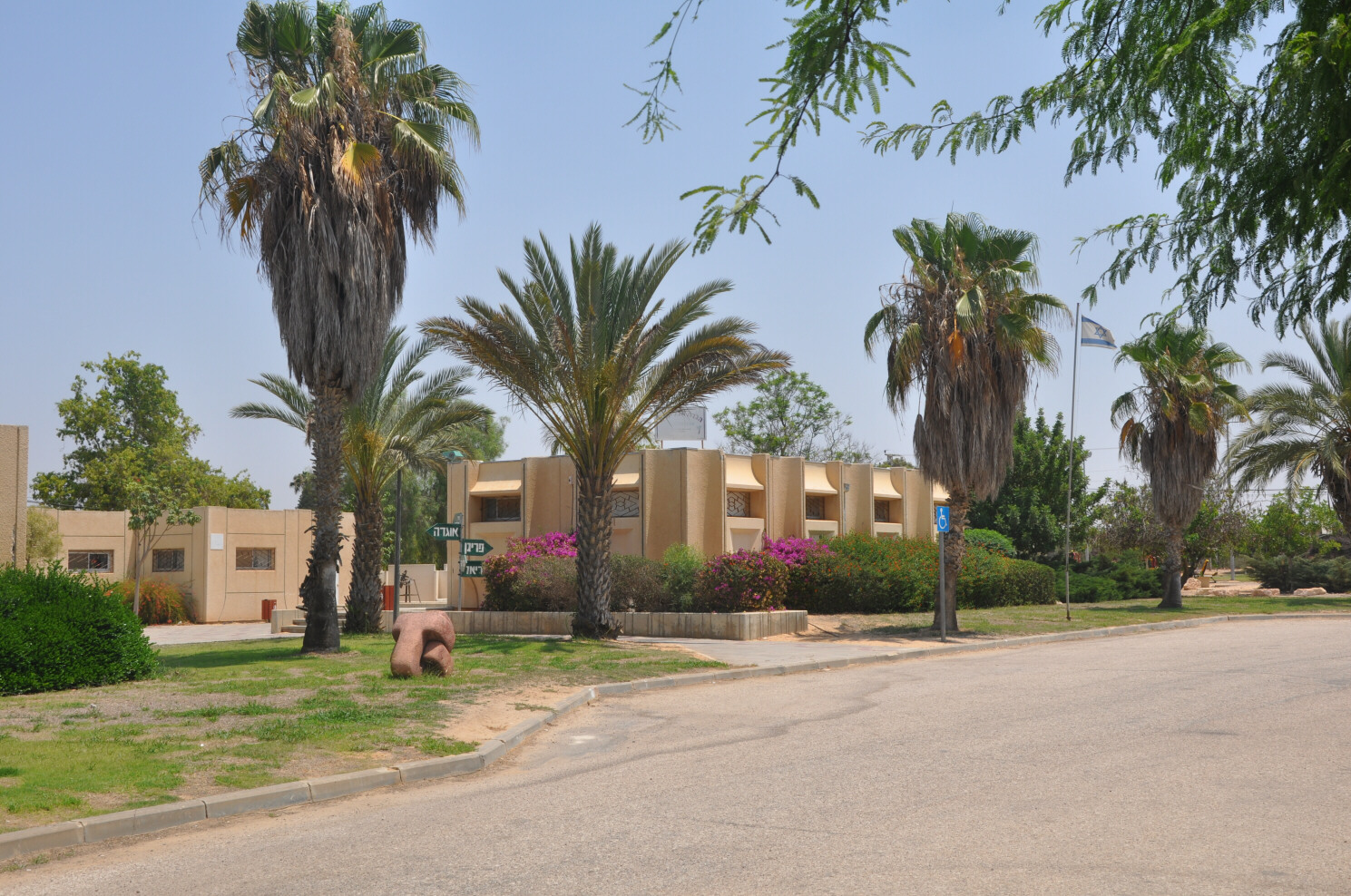
Moshav Dekel (2011)

In 5729 (1969), a Nahal outpost was established in the Yamit region named "Dekel" to commemorate the palm tree marking Avshalom's grave. After the IDF withdrawal from Sinai, the settlement was reestablished in the Peace District under the same name. In the summer of 5733 (1973), a regional center was built for the Rafiah Salient named "Avshalom Center" after Avshalom Feinberg. The name persists in the new settlement in the Peace District called Avshalom.

In 2009, Yedioth Books published "A Sign from Avshalom", a Hebrew novel by Nava Macmel-Atir based on the life story of Avshalom Feinberg. The book quickly became a best-seller, selling 20,000 copies within three months of its release. After six months, it was awarded the Platinum Book by the Book Publishers Association of Israel for reaching 40,000 copies sold. In June 2015, it received the "Diamond Book" award for surpassing 100,000 copies sold.

East of Highway 4, north of the Ra'an junction, a memorial site was established in memory of Avshalom. After the discovery of his remains, an inscription was added at the site describing the event. In 2010, due to the need for road expansion nearby, the site was moved entirely to the Hadera River Park.

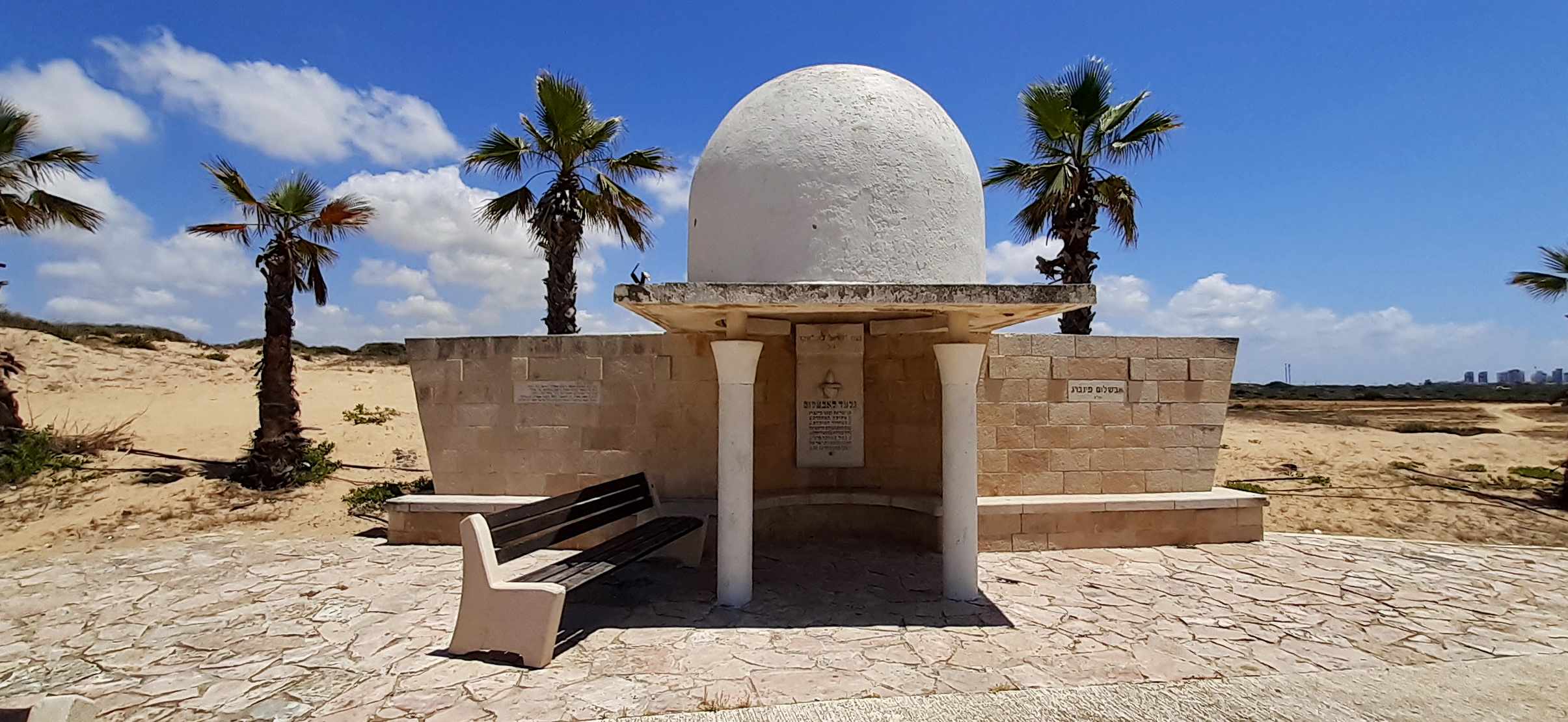
Monument to Avshalom Feinberg in Hadera

The renovated house of the Feinberg family in Hadera opened to the public in October 2008.

=== Annual memorial ===
In 2007, marking 90 years since Avshalom's fall, two students from the Ofra Girls School, Shir Ben Haim and Merav Edri, went to his grave and were surprised to find no one there. In subsequent years, the two began to lead the annual memorial for Avshalom. Since 2010, the "Im Tirtzu" movement has joined the initiative and has even taken on organizing the memorial for years. Among the speakers at the memorial are numerous public figures and members of the Feinberg family, including former MK Tamar Eshel, Feinberg's niece, Lehi fighter Ezra Yachin, and Eliad Bar-Shaul.

== Gallery ==
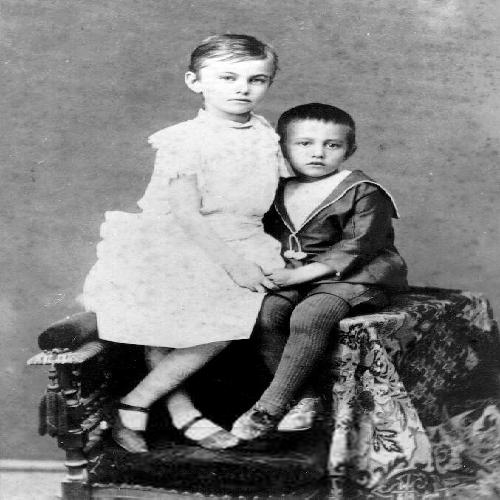
Shoshana and Avshalom Feinberg (circa 1895)

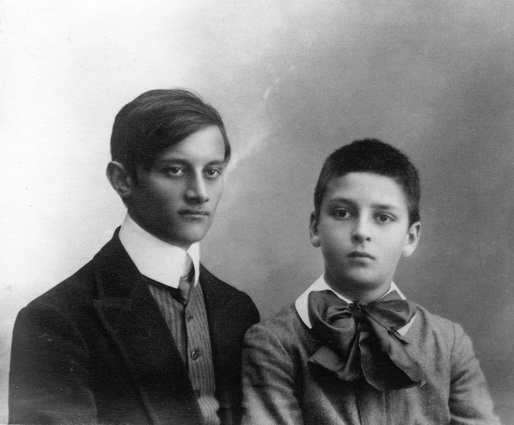
Avshalom Feinberg, aged 20, with Shaul (Pava), the 13-year-old son of Boris Feinberg in 1910.

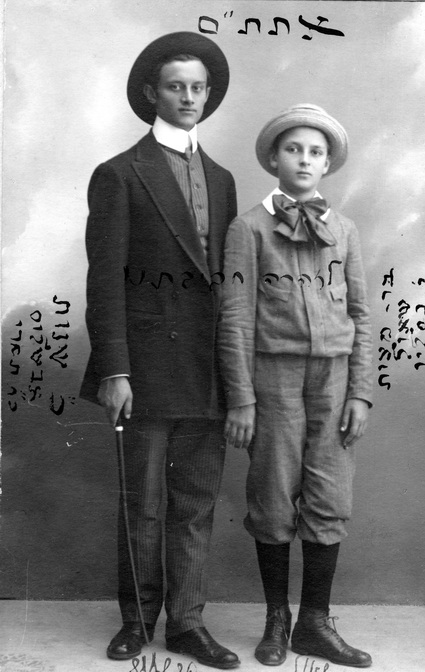
Feinberg, aged 20, with Shaul (Pava), the 13-year-old son of Boris Feinberg.

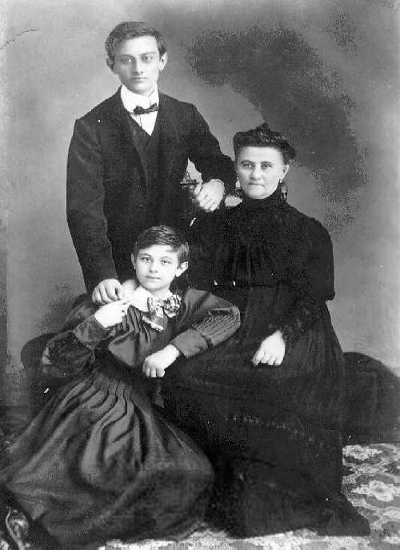
Fania (wife of Israel Feinberg), her son Avshalom, and her daughter Tsila Feinberg (circa 1908/9).

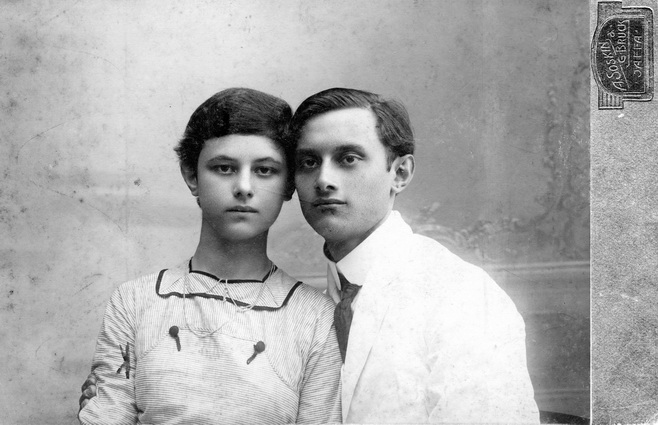
Avshalom and Tsila photographed in Jaffa, 1910. The photo was taken for their father, who was about to travel to Germany for medical treatment.

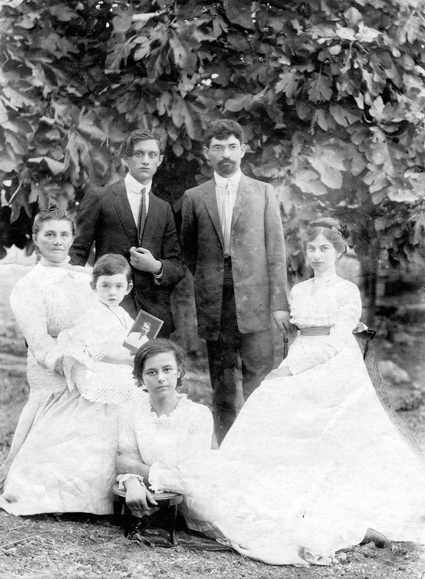
The Feinberg family in 1910

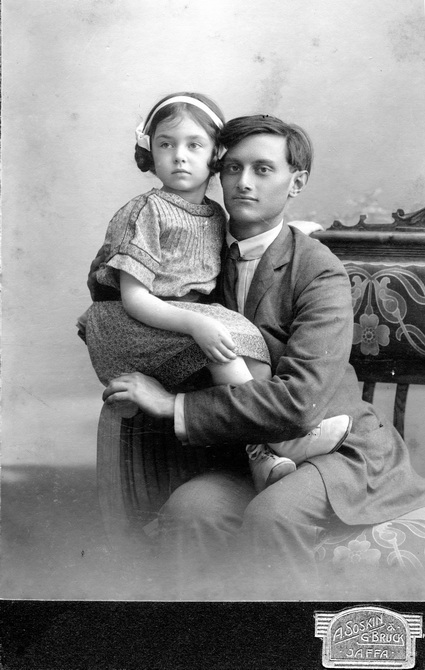
Avshalom with his niece, Zahara, in 1911.

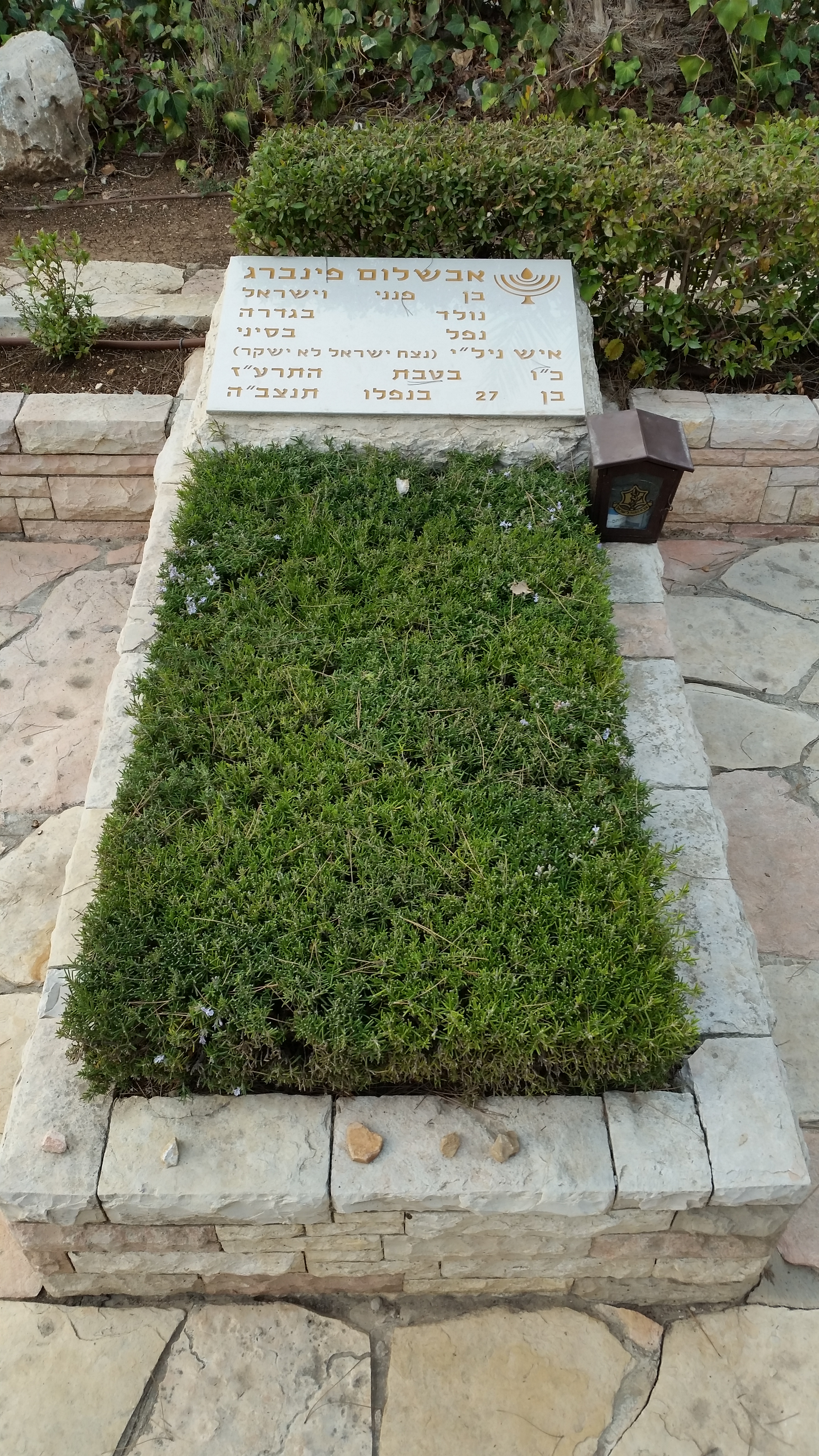
Avshalom Feinberg's grave in the Olei HaGardom section at the military cemetery on Mount Herzl. In May 2009, a shoot from the palm tree that grew from the date kernel in his pocket at the time of his murder was planted near the grave

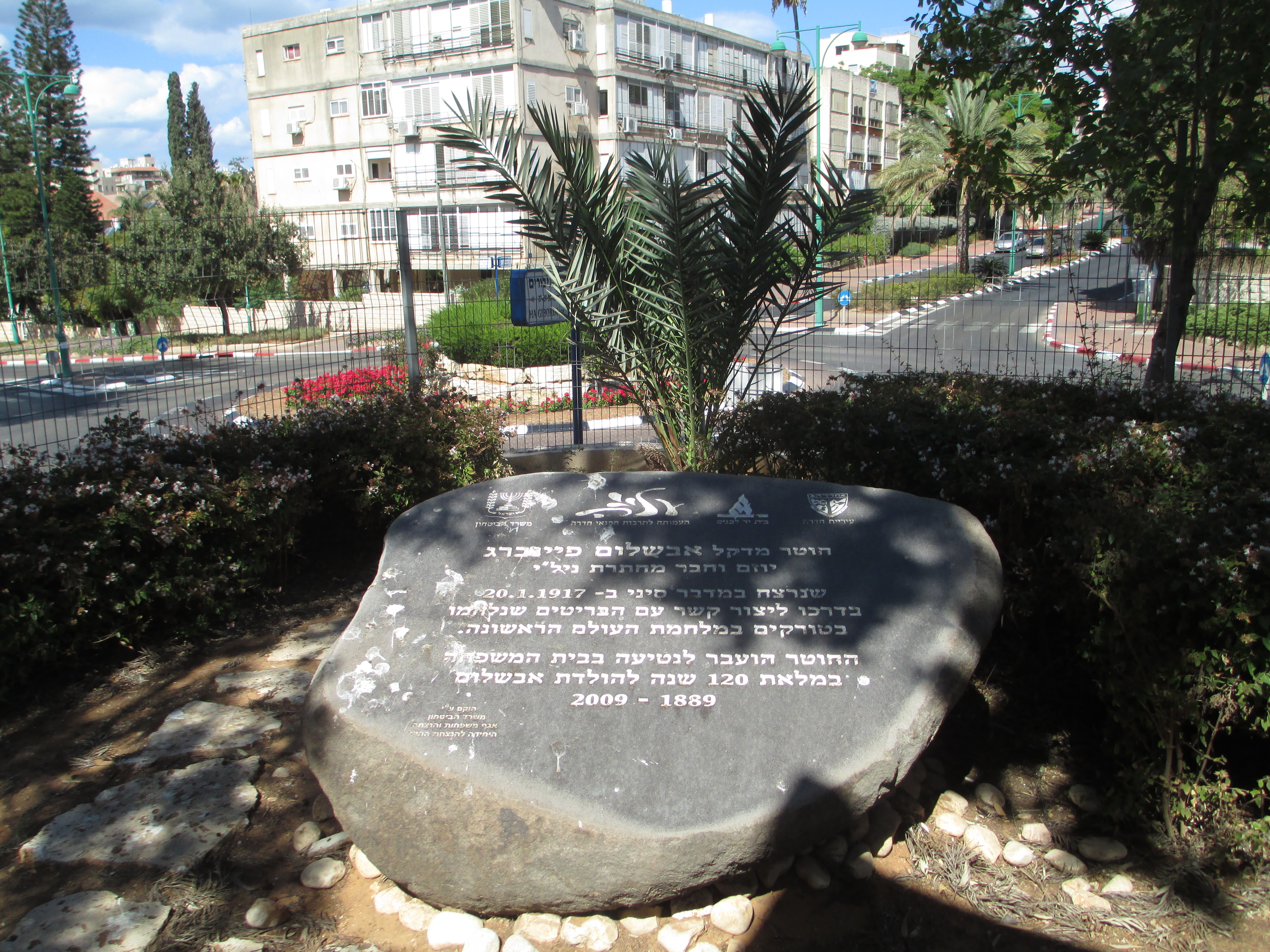
A shoot from Avshalom's palm tree in the yard of the Feinberg House in Hadera
