= Sarah Aaronsohn =

Jewish spy working for the British in World War I (1890–1917)

- שרה אהרנסון
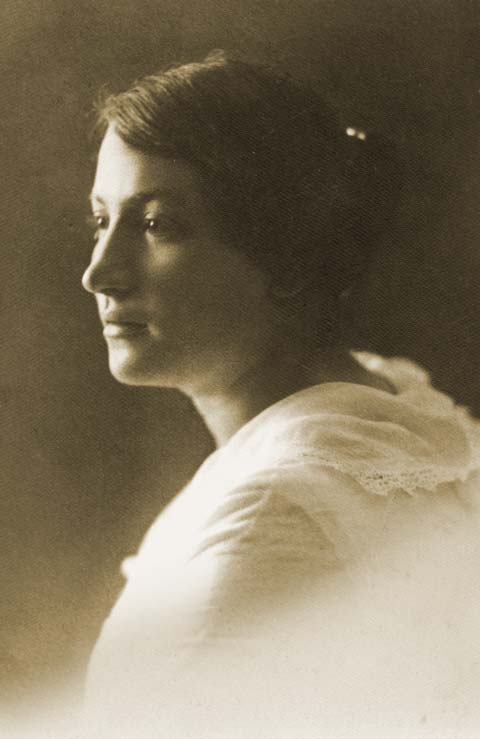
- Born: January 5, 1890; Zikhron Ya'akov, Haifa District, Ottoman Syria
- Died: October 9, 1917 (aged 27); Zikhron Ya'akov, Haifa District, Ottoman Syria
- Occupation: Spy
- Family: Aaron Aaronsohn (brother); Alexander Aaronsohn (brother); Avshalom Feinberg (brother in-law)

Sarah Aaronsohn (Hebrew: שרה אהרנסון, 5 January 1890 – 9 October 1917) was a member of Nili, a ring of Jewish spies working for the British in World War I, and a sister of agronomist Aaron Aaronsohn. She is often referred to as the "heroine of Nili".

== Biography ==
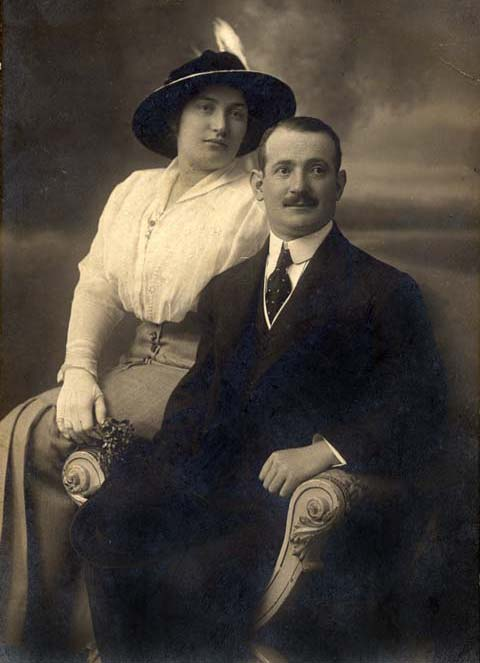
Aaronsohn with Abraham in 1914

Sarah Aaronsohn was born in Zichron Yaakov, which at the time was part of Ottoman Syria. Her parents were Zionists of Romanian-Jewish origins who had come to Ottoman Palestine as some of the first settlers of the First Aliyah and were founders of the moshava where Aaronsohn was born. Encouraged by her brother Aaron, she studied languages and was fluent in Hebrew, Yiddish, Turkish and French, had reasonable command of Arabic and taught herself English. On 31 March 1914, she was married in Atlit to Haim Abraham, an affluent merchant from Bulgaria, and Zionist activist and lived briefly with him in Istanbul; but the marriage was an unhappy one and she returned home to Zichron Yaakov in December 1915.

On her way from Istanbul to Haifa, Aaronsohn witnessed part of the Armenian genocide. She testified to seeing hundreds of bodies of Armenian men, women, children, and babies; sick Armenians being loaded onto trains; with the dead being tossed out and replaced by the living. After her trip to Haifa, any allusions to Armenians upset her greatly. According to Chaim Herzog, Aaronsohn decided to assist British forces as a result of what she had witnessed.

== Pro-British espionage ==
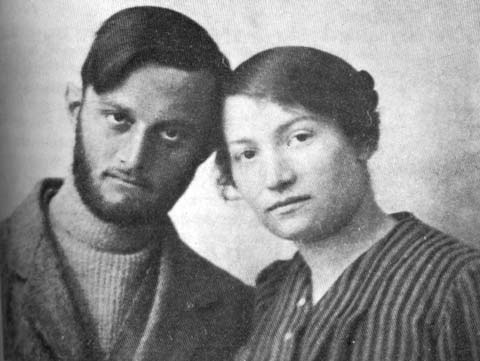
Feinberg and Aaronsohn in 1916

Aaronsohn, her sister Rivka Aaronsohn, and her brothers Aaron Aaronsohn and Alexander Aaronsohn, with their friend (and fiancé of Rivka) Avshalom Feinberg formed and led the Nili spy organization. Aaronsohn oversaw operations in Palestine of the spy ring and passed information to British agents offshore. Sometimes she travelled widely through Ottoman territory collecting information useful to the British, and brought it directly to them in Egypt. In 1917, her brother Alexander urged her to remain in British-controlled Egypt, expecting hostilities from Ottoman authorities; but Aaronsohn returned to Zichron Yaakov to continue Nili activities. Nili developed into the largest pro-British espionage network in the Middle East, with a network of about 40 spies.

== Torture and suicide ==
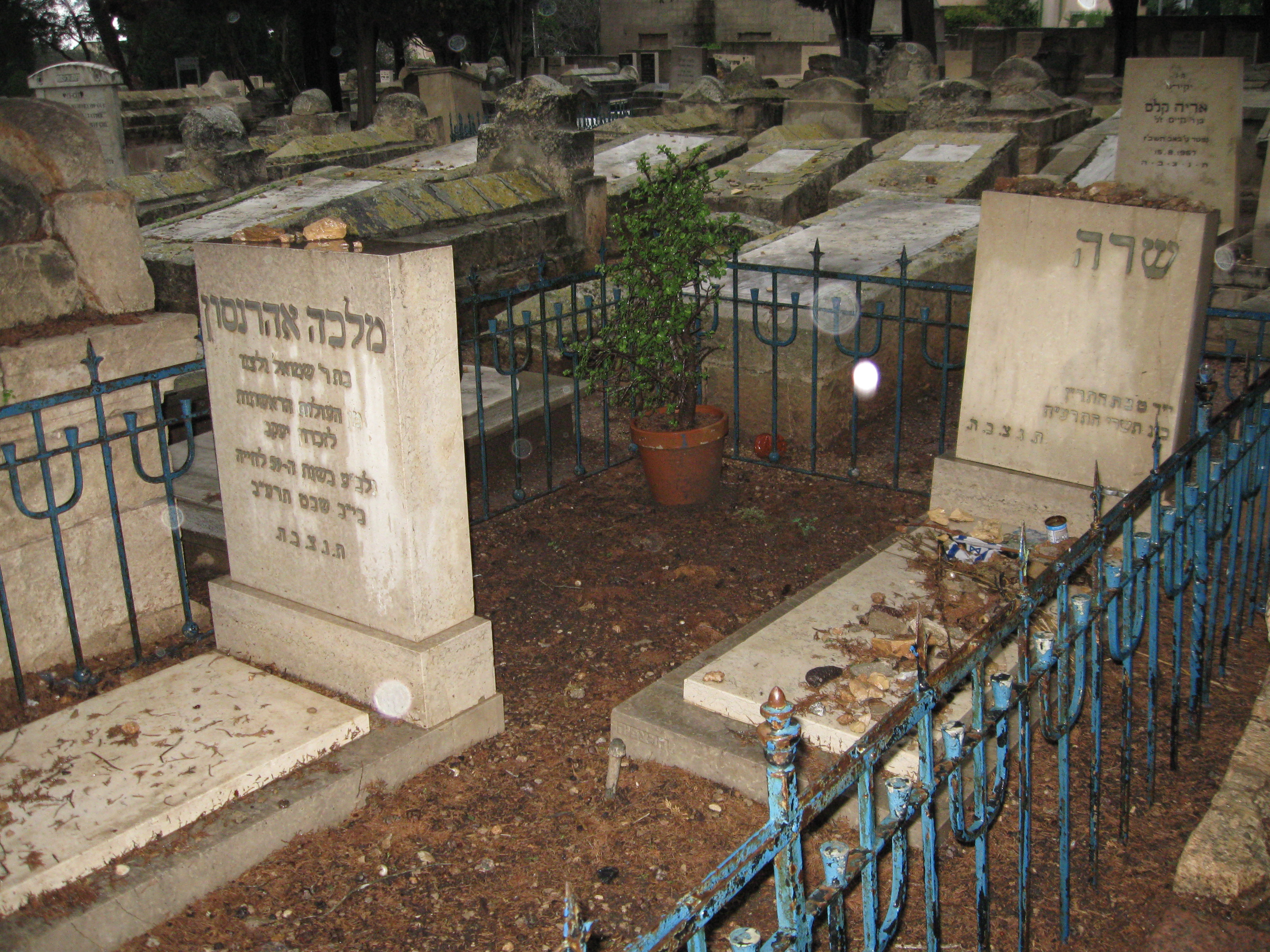
Sarah Aaronsohn's (right) and her mother's graves at the Zikhron cemetery in Israel

In September 1917, the Ottomans intercepted her carrier pigeon carrying a message to the British and decrypted the Nili code. In October, the Ottomans surrounded Zichron Yaakov and arrested numerous people, including Aaronsohn. Her captors tortured her father in front of her. She endured four days of torture herself, but she refused to give any information. Before she was to be transferred to Damascus for further torture, she asked permission to return to her home in Zichron Yaakov to change her blood-stained clothes. While there, she managed to shoot herself with a pistol concealed under a tile in the bathroom. According to Scott Anderson, in his book Lawrence in Arabia, Aaronsohn shot herself in the mouth on Friday 5 October 1917. "Even this did not end the torment of Sarah Aaronsohn. While the bullet destroyed her mouth and severed her spinal cord, it missed her brain. For four days she lingered in agony." In Spies in Palestine, James Srodes quotes the diary of Dr. Hillel Yaffe as saying that Sarah pleaded with him, "For heaven's sake, put an end to my life. I beg you, kill me…I can't suffer any longer…." Instead, Dr. Yaffee administered morphine. She died on 9 October 1917. In her last letter, she expressed her hope that her activities in Nili would bring nearer the realization of a national home for the Jews in Eretz Israel.

Because of the Jewish views on suicide, Aaronsohn was denied a traditional burial in a Jewish cemetery. However, refusing a Jewish burial for her was unpopular. As a compromise, a small fence was placed around her grave in the cemetery (symbolically removing her grave from the surrounding hallowed ground).

== Legacy ==
Aaronsohn was the first example of a "secular, active death of a Jewish-Zionist woman for the nation, unprecedented in both religious martyrdom and in the Zionist tradition established in Palestine". Annual pilgrimages to her tomb in Zikhron's cemetery started in 1935. After the Six-Day War of 1967, the memory of Aaronsohn and of Nili became a part of Israel's cult of heroism, officially recognized by the Labor Party and celebrated in children's literature.

== See also ==
- Balfour Declaration
- Zionism
- Ot me-Avshalom a Hebrew novel by Nava Macmel-Atir
