= Ot me-Avshalom =

2009 novel by Nava Macmel-Atir

- Book cover of 'Ot me-Avshalom'
- Author: Nava Macmel-Atir
- Original title: אות מאבשלום
- Language: Hebrew
- Subject: Avshalom Feinberg & The Nili spy ring
- Genre: Novel
- Set in: Modern day Israel & Late 19th century/Early 20th century Ottoman-ruled Palestine
- Publisher: Yediot Books
- Publication date: 2009
- Publication place: Israel
- Pages: 530
- Awards: Golden Book Commemoration; Platinum Book Commemoration; Diamond Book Commemoration
- ISBN: 978-965-482-889-5
- OCLC: 430497472
- Website: אות מאבשלום (Hebrew)

Ot me-Avshalom (Hebrew: אות מאבשלום Translation: A Letter from Avshalom or A Sign from Avshalom) is a novel by Israeli author Nava Macmel-Atir published by Yediot Books in 2009. The book quickly became a best-seller, and Macmel-Atir received the Golden Book award for selling 20,000 copies in just three months after its release. Half a year after its publication, Ot me-Avshalom received the Platinum Book award from the Book Publishers Association of Israel for selling 40,000 copies. In June 2015, it received the "Diamond Book" commemoration for selling 100,000 copies.

== Plot ==
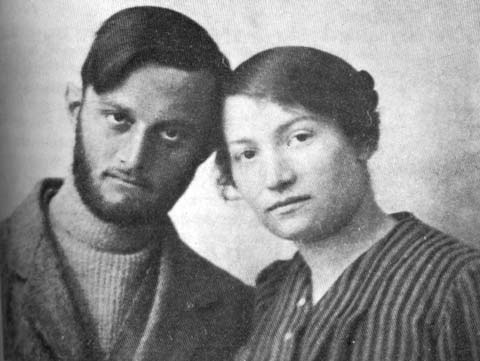
Avshalom Feinberg and Sara Aharonson of the Nili spy ring, 1916

A young graphologist, Alma Bach, embarks on the trail of a man whose handwriting was sent to her for analysis. She discovers characteristics such as sharp wit, high degree of general knowledge, and courage. She discovers a passionate man with a highly developed imagination, linguistic style, and the sensitivity of an artist, a man with a magnetic personality who draws people to him while at the same time secluding himself and keeping a secret, and who is capable of loving at great magnitudes and willing to sacrifice for his love, for his love of the land, for his love of a woman, and eventually to pay the ultimate price. Alma is determined to meet this man face-to-face.

The story moves back and forth between two time periods: modern-day Israel, where Alma undergoes her journey to discover the man, and a biographical depiction of Avshalom Feinberg, founder and leader of the Nili spy ring, which starts in late 19th-century Palestine and continues into the early 20th century.

== Awards ==
- Golden Book Commemoration – Book Publishers Association of Israel – September 2009
- Platinum Book Commemoration – Book Publishers Association of Israel – January 2010
- Diamond Book Commemoration – Book Publishers Association of Israel – June 2015
