= Eshel =

Eshel (Hebrew: אֵשֶׁל) may refer to:

== Organizations ==
- Eshel (organization), Orthodox LGBTQ support organization

== Places ==
Israel

- Eshel HaNasi, Israel
- Beit Eshel, Mandatory Palestine

United States

- Eshel, California

== People with the surname ==
- Hanan Eshel
- Tamar Eshel (1920–2022), Israeli diplomat and politician
