= Srodes =

Srodes is a surname. Notable people with the surname include:

- James Srodes (1940–2017), American journalist and author
