= Aaron Aaronsohn =

Jewish agronomist, botanist, and Zionist activist (1876–1919)

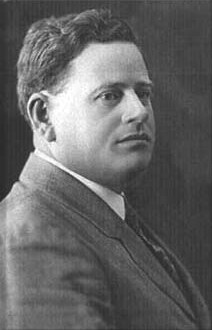
- Born: 21 May 1876; Bacău, Principality of Romania
- Died: 15 May 1919 (aged 42); English Channel
- Relatives: Sarah Aaronsohn (sister) Alexander Aaronsohn (brother)
- Scientific career
- Known for: Discoverer of emmer (Triticum dicoccoides)
- Fields: Agronomy, botany, political activism
- Author abbrev. (botany): Aarons.

Aaron Aaronsohn (Hebrew: אהרון אהרנסון) (21 May 1876 – 15 May 1919) was a Romanian-born Jewish agronomist, botanist, and political activist, who lived most of his life in Zikhron Ya'akov. Aaronsohn was the discoverer of wild emmer (Triticum dicoccoides), believed to be "the mother of wheat." He founded and was head of the NILI espionage network.

== Biography ==
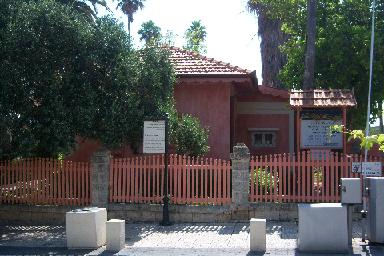
Aaronsohn memorial home at Zikhron Ya'akov

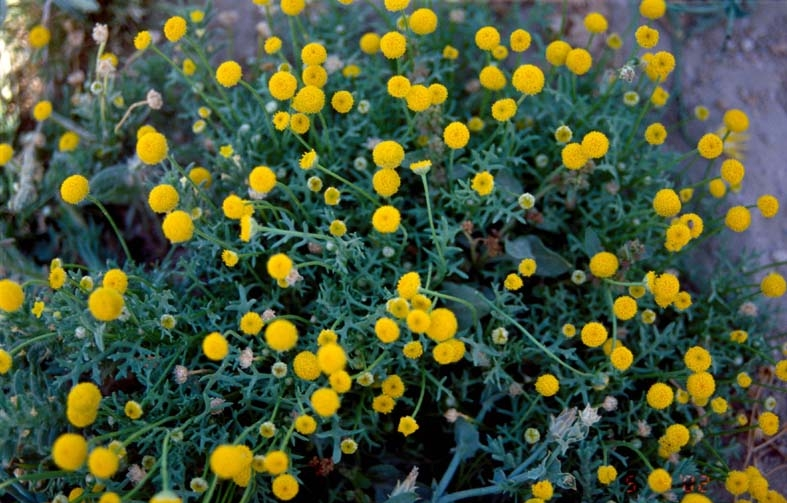
Aaronsohnia

Aaron Aaronsohn was born in Bacău, Romania, and brought to Palestine, then part of the Turkish Ottoman Empire, at the age of six. His parents were among the founders of Zikhron Ya'akov, one of the pioneer Jewish agricultural settlements of the First Aliyah. He had two sisters, Sarah and Rivka, and a brother, Alexander. Aaronsohn was the first car-owner in Palestine and one of the first to own a bicycle, which he brought back from France. The languages Aaronsohn spoke at home were Yiddish and Hebrew, but he also knew English, Arabic, Turkish, French, German, and some Italian.

== Agriculture and botany ==
After studying agriculture in France, sponsored by French Baron Edmond de Rothschild, Aaronsohn worked in Metulla, then a new colony in the north of the country. He left Metulla to establish an organization for agricultural technology. Together with a member of the German Templer community he launched a business for importing and selling agricultural machines such as reapers, harrows and combine harvesters using modern marketing methods. Another company he established sold gasoline-operated pumps, a centrifuge for separating cream and making butter, and fertilizers. He also imported different varieties of seeds and vines.

He botanically mapped Palestine and its surroundings and became a leading expert on the subject. On his 1906 field trip to Mount Hermon, while trekking around the Upper Galilee in the area of Rashaya in what is now Lebanon, he discovered Triticum dicoccoides, whom he considered to be the "mother of wheat", an important find for agronomists and historians of human civilization. Geneticists have proven that wild emmer is indeed an ancestor of most domesticated wheat strands cultivated on a large scale today with the exception of einkorn, a different ancient species, which is currently just a relict crop.

This discovery made Aaronsohn world-famous and, on a trip to the United States, he was able to secure financial backing for a research station established in Atlit in 1909. Aaronsohn built up a large collection of geological and botanical samples and established a library.

Aaronsohn served as a scientific consultant to Djemal Pasha during a crop-destroying desert locust invasion in 1915. In March–October of that year, the locusts stripped the country of almost all vegetation. Aaronsohn and the team fighting the locust invasion was given permission to move around the area known as Southern Syria (including modern day Israel) and made detailed maps of the areas they surveyed. Aaronsohn also collected strategic information about Ottoman camps and troop deployment.

In 1918, Aaronsohn was one of the experts consulted for the purpose of demarcating the northern boundary of Palestine, focusing on the need for irrigation water. He envisaged a boundary that would assure the inclusion of the sources of the Jordan, Litani and Yarmuk rivers. His approach became the official Zionist baseline presented to the Peace Conference in Paris in February 1919.

== Political activity and espionage ==
During World War I, the Ottomans had joined sides with the Germans, and Aaronsohn feared the Jews would suffer the same fate as the Armenians under the Turks. Together with his assistant Avshalom Feinberg, his sister Sarah Aaronsohn and a few others, Aaronsohn organized Nili, a ring of Jewish residents of Palestine who spied for Britain during World War I. He had access to detailed information about the Turks, because they has used him extensively across the region to combat enormous locust swarms. Aaronsohn recommended the plan of attack through Beersheba that General Edmund Allenby ultimately used to take Jerusalem in December 1917 as part of the Sinai and Palestine Campaign. Owing to information supplied by Nili to the British Army concerning the locations of oases in the desert, General Allenby was able to mount a surprise attack on Beersheba, bypassing strong Ottoman defenses in Gaza. As a result of Aaronsohn's efforts the British government looked favorably on the Zionist cause, a factor in the issuance of the Balfour declaration.

In 1917, Chaim Weizmann sent Aaronsohn on a political campaign to the United States. While there, Aaronsohn learned that the Ottoman authorities had intercepted a Nili carrier pigeon, which led to the arrest and torture of his sister Sarah and other members of the underground.

== Death and legacy ==
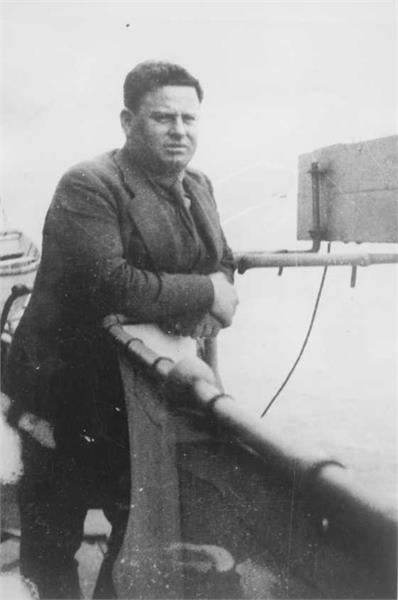
Final image of Aaronsohn

After the war, Weizmann called on Aaronsohn to work on the Versailles Peace Conference. On 15 May 1919, under unclear circumstances, Aaronsohn was killed in an airplane crash over the English Channel while on his way to France. Some blamed the British government.

Aaronsohn died a bachelor and had no children. His research on Palestine and Transjordan flora, as well as part of his exploration diaries, were published posthumously.

After Aaronsohn's death, the director of British Military Intelligence confirmed that Allenby's victory would not have been possible without the information supplied by the Aaronsohn group.

== Published works ==
- Agricultural and botanical explorations in Palestine, 1910
- "Shemot ha-tzemachim" ("Botanical names"), in: Hashelaḥ 26 (1912)
- Reliquiae Aaronsohnianae, 1940

The standard author abbreviation Aarons. is used to indicate this person as the author when citing a botanical name.

== See also ==
- Agricultural research in Israel
- Wildlife of Israel
