= Alexander Aaronsohn =

Jewish author and activist (1888-1948)

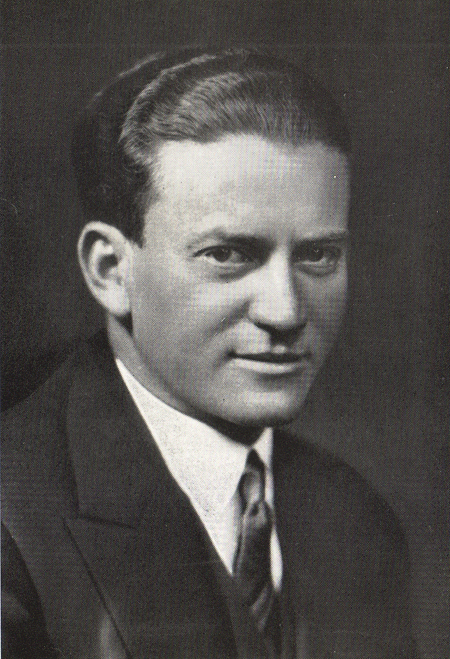
- Born: September 28, 1888; Zikhron Ya'akov, Ottoman Empire
- Died: 28 May 1948 (aged 59); Nice, France
- Occupations: Author, Zionist activist

Alexander Aaronsohn (Hebrew: אלכסנדר אהרנסון; September 28, 1888 – May 28, 1948) was an author and activist who wrote about the plight of people living in Palestine in his book, With the Turks in Palestine.

Aaronsohn was part of the influential Aaronsohn family who were major figures in the Zionist movement; his brother was Aaron Aaronsohn and his sister was Sarah Aaronsohn, the three of whom were founder members of the Jewish spy network NILI. Sarah Aaronsohn was caught by the Turks and brutally tortured for four days; she committed suicide during her captivity in 1917, aged 26.

== Early life ==
Aaronsohn's parents emigrated from Romania to Palestine with other Jewish families and founded the community of Zikhron Ya'akov in the fertile region south of Mount Carmel. Aaronsohn was born in this small village and grew up amongst a blossoming agricultural community.

In 1910 Aaronsohn left for America on the advice of his brother who headed the Jewish Experiment Station at Atlit. He received his naturalization papers a few days after arrival and obtained work with the Department of Agriculture.

Aaronsohn returned to Palestine with the goal of taking motion pictures and stereopticon views that he would use to spread knowledge about Jewish life in the Land of Israel. He then planned to share this media in the United States.

Two months after his return Aaronsohn learned of an attack on a well-respected Jewish doctor by four Arabs and the abduction of a sixteen-year-old girl. This event shocked Aaronsohn and he vowed to form a strong society that would protect the life and honor of villagers.

== Turkish Army ==
Despite Aaronsohn's ties to the United States, he was pushed into serving in the Turkish Army with the start of the First World War, as the Ottoman Empire controlled Palestine. Aaronsohn and twenty of his acquaintances presented themselves at the recruiting station in Acre. They were then marched off to Han and made to wait with hundreds of impoverished Arabs. Aaronsohn was subsequently ordered to travel to Safed, where his garrison was located.

Aaronsohn and his troupe's four-day march to Safed was an arduous journey in the heat of the September sun. They were required to obtain their own food, and the poor Arabs caused conflict by stealing from villages that they passed by. On arrival in Safed, they were informed that a dirty deserted mosque would serve as their barracks.

== Later life and death ==
Aaronsohn died of a heart attack in 1948 in Nice, France.
