= Nili =

Jewish underground movement in the Ottoman Mutasarrifate of Jerusalem

NILI
- ניל״י
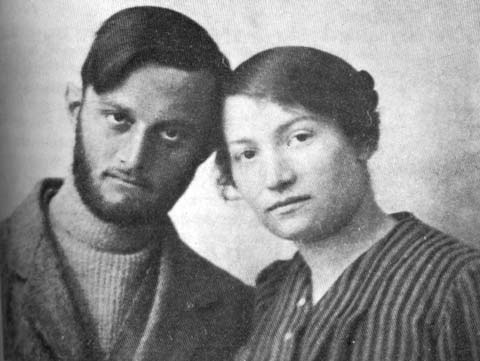
- Avshalom Feinberg and Sarah Aaronsohn of the Nili spy ring, 1916
- Active: 1915–1917
- Country: Ottoman Empire (operating within the Mutasarrifate of Jerusalem)
- Allegiance: United Kingdom
- Type: Espionage
- Role: Intelligence gathering
- Garrison/HQ: Zikhron Ya'akov
- Motto: Netzaḥ Yisrael Lo Yeshaker ("The Eternal One of Israel will not lie")

Commanders
- Notable commanders: Sarah Aaronsohn; Aaron Aaronsohn; Avshalom Feinberg; Yosef Lishansky

NILI (Hebrew: ניל״י) was a Jewish espionage network which assisted the United Kingdom in the fight against the Ottoman Empire between 1915 and 1917 during World War I in the Mutasarrifate of Jerusalem. NILI was based in Zikhron Ya'akov, with branches in Hadera and other Moshavot. Nili is an acronym which stands for the Hebrew phrase: "Netzah Yisrael Lo Yeshaker" (1 Samuel 15:29), which translates as "the Eternal One of Israel will not lie". The British government code-named NILI the "A Organization", according to a 1920 misfiled memorandum in the British National Archives, as described in the book Spies in Palestine by James Srodes.

In choosing to side with the British Empire, the members of Nili went against the majority view of their fellow Jews from the Yishuv. Thus, during the Armenian genocide, the group opposed the Yishuv leadership at the time, and tried to intervene on behalf of the Armenians.

== Establishment ==
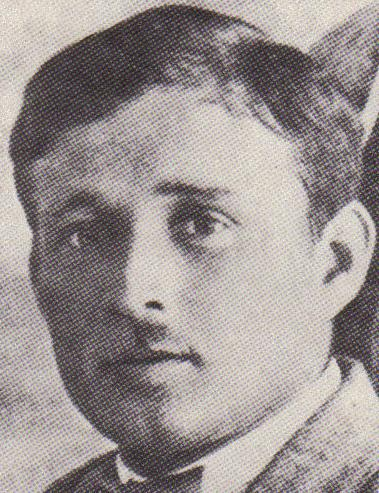
Yosef Lishansky of the Nili spy ring

Sarah Aaronsohn, her brothers Aaron and Alexander, and their sister Rivka, together with their friend (and Sarah's fiancé) Avshalom Feinberg formed and led Nili.

In 1915, before the group commenced operations, the Ottomans imprisoned Feinberg on suspicion of spying, which was not true at the time. When Feinberg was arrested for espionage and held in Beersheba, Yosef Lishansky joined Nili in December 1915. Because he was active in the south, he was recruited by Feinberg to pass information to and from Sarah Aaronsohn, who was operating from Atlit.

From March to October 1915, a plague of locusts stripped areas in and around Palestine of almost all vegetation. The Turkish authorities, worried about feeding their troops, turned to world-famous botanist and the region's leading agronomist, Aaron Aaronsohn, who requested the release of his friend and assistant, Avshalom Feinberg. The team fighting the locust invasion was given permission to move around the country, enabling them to collect strategic information about Ottoman camps and troop deployment.

For months, the group was not taken seriously by British intelligence, and attempts by Aaron Aaronsohn and Avshalom Feinberg to establish communication channels in Cairo and Port Said failed. Only after Aaronsohn arrived in London (by way of Berlin and Copenhagen) and owing to his reputation, was he able to obtain cooperation from the diplomat Sir Mark Sykes.

Sarah oversaw operations in Palestine from Zikhron Ya'akov.

== Demise ==
Attempting to reach Egypt on foot, Avshalom Feinberg was killed and Yosef Lishansky was wounded but managed to reach British lines.

From February to September 1917, the steam yacht Managem regularly sailed to the Palestinian coast near Atlit. Lishansky swam ashore to collect Nili information and to pass money sent by American Jews to the starving Yishuv. However, the presence of German submarines made the trips too risky and the group switched to homing pigeons.

In the fall of 1917, the Bosnian mudir of Qisarya, Ahmad Bek Kat-huda Ćehajić, exposed Nili when he intercepted one of its carrier pigeons. The Ottomans were able to decipher the Nili code (based on Hebrew, Aramaic, French, and English) within one week. As a result, the Ottomans were able to unravel the spy network, whereupon the leadership of the Yishuv and the Hashomer disassociated itself from Nili. One Nili member, Na'aman Belkind, was captured by the Ottomans and reportedly revealed information about the group.

In October 1917, the Ottomans surrounded Zikhron Ya'akov and arrested numerous people, including Sarah Aaronsohn, who committed suicide after four days of torture. Other prisoners were incarcerated in Damascus. Lishansky and Belkind were hanged.

== Controversies ==
Nili's "irresponsibility" for not coordinating their operations with the Zionist leadership, thereby endangering the Yishuv, was the cause of a longstanding controversy among the Jewish community of the British Mandate of Palestine and subsequently of the State of Israel. The issue was officially resolved in November 1967, when Feinberg's remains were reinterred on Mount Herzl with full military honors, with eulogies delivered by both Speaker of the Knesset and chief chaplain of the IDF.

== Remembrance ==
The Aaronsohn home in Zikhron Ya'akov, Beit Aaronsohn, has been preserved as a museum and memorial to Nili. West of Zikhron Ya'akov is a moshav called Givat Nili. The settlement Nili in the western Binyamin region is also named for Nili. Many streets throughout Israel bear the Nili name. In December 2015. the Israel Post marked the centenary of Nili with a special stamp issue. In 2023 name of this network was taken by unit Nili.

== Sources ==
- ——— (2012). Israel: A History. UPNE. ISBN 978-1-61168-353-0.
