= James Srodes =

American historian (born 1940)

- Born: March 12, 1940; New Castle, Pennsylvania, U.S.
- Died: September 27, 2017 (aged 77); Washington, D.C., U.S.
- Education: University of Florida (BA)
- Occupations: Journalist and Author
- Spouse: Cecile Srodes

James Srodes (March 12, 1940 – September 27, 2017) was an American journalist and author. In 2015 and 2016, the Virginia Press Association awarded Srodes its first prize for critical writing for his series of book reviews for The Washington Times.

== Career ==
James Srodes was born in New Castle, Pennsylvania, on March 12, 1940. After graduating from the University of Florida and attending Duke University School of Law, Srodes began his career as a political reporter for the Atlanta Journal. As a financial journalist, Srodes covered the White House and Washington economics beats for the bureaus of United Press International, Business Week, Forbes, and Financial World magazines. He served as bureau chief for Forbes and Financial World. From 1973 through 1996 he wrote a weekly column for the Sunday Telegraph of London and for newspapers and magazines in Europe, Asia, and Africa. Srodes writes regularly for magazines on politics and finance, and he has a weekly commentary program on the BBC Radio 4 World Service. He authored six books and wrote extensively on the global intelligence community.

== Spying on the CIA Director ==
Long before writing books on spies, Srodes spied on the top U.S. spy. This incident occurred when Srodes was a member of the Business Council press corps, a tightly knit group which regularly covered the semi-annual meeting of 200 chief executives of large corporations. From the 1960s to the 1980s, the Business Council met at the Homestead Hotel, now the Omni Homestead Resort, in Hot Springs, Virginia. When CIA Director Richard Helms addressed the Business Council in a locked-door dinner in the spring of 1969, he made it clear that his talk was off the record and no reporters would be briefed or included. Time magazine reported that the 29-year-old Srodes, then of U.P.I., figured out a way to eavesdrop. Srodes discovered an open microphone from the head table to the kitchen so that the staff would know when to clear tables and serve without disrupting the speaker. The CIA director reportedly described Ho Chi Minh as “an utterly cold-blooded individual, not at all a kindly uncle” and called the Kremlin leadership “morally bankrupt.” Srodes filed his story before Helms finished speaking. Writing about the incident in the January, 1970 issue of Dun’s Review, Gerald R. Rosen described Srodes as a “whip-smart 230-pound behemoth.”

== Books Written ==
His most recent biography is Spies in Palestine: Love, Betrayal and the Heroic Life of Sarah Aaronsohn published by Counterpoint Press in 2016. The book is the story of Sarah Aaronsohn and her prominent family, early settlers of Palestine who formed the Nili espionage network to spy for the Allies against the Ottoman Turkish Empire during World War One. The book is a story of lost opportunities. The Times of Israel quotes Srodes as saying, “There was a brief window at the turn of the 20th century where Jews and Arabs had a common alliance of sorts that could have been built on, because they had a common enemy in the Ottoman Turks. But the fact that it didn’t turn out that way is a real tragedy.” According to Booklist, “In this engaging story of the woman called the Flame of Israel, a woman greatly admired by the fabled Lawrence of Arabia, Srodes also details the lost opportunity for a peaceful alliance between the new Israel and the indigenous people of the region.”

Srodes' previous book is a multiple-biography titled On Dupont Circle: Franklin and Eleanor Roosevelt and the Progressives Who Shaped Our World that was published by Counterpoint Press in 2013. The book, which was a finalist for the Los Angeles Times history book award and also was nominated for a Pulitzer Prize, portrays a group of reform-minded strivers in Washington, D.C. between World War I and World War II. This group included Herbert Hoover, William Bullitt, Felix Frankfurter, Walter Lippmann, Sumner Welles, John Foster Dulles, Allen Dulles, Eleanor Lansing Dulles, Eleanor Roosevelt and Franklin Roosevelt. According to the Washington Independent Review of Books, “James Srodes deftly portrays their colorful stories. He also makes the bold argument that the 'set,' as he calls them, profoundly influenced U.S. policies for much of the 20th century.” According to a review in Publishers Weekly, “Srodes is refreshingly unafraid to question his subjects' motives.”

Srodes is also the author of Franklin: The Essential Founding Father. The biography of Benjamin Franklin was chosen by the City of Philadelphia in 2006 for its One Book-One Philadelphia community reading program in celebration of Franklin's 300th birthday. The city's Free Library system of 60 branch libraries circulated a special edition of the biography as part of the One Book program's literacy promotion efforts. As part of that effort, Srodes appeared at a series of book talks and seminars at local library branches, schools and area colleges during a four-month period. Franklin: The Essential Founding Father was also translated into simplified Chinese and published in China by Guang-dong People's Publishing House (GDPPH), a division of Beijing Shi Zu Niao Culture Communication Co.

Srodes also was the moderator of a symposium featuring five other Franklin historians at the Free Library that was broadcast on C-SPAN’s weekend book program to kick off the Franklin Tercentenary Commission three-year traveling history and memorabilia exhibit of Franklin's life and times. With Peter Earnest, executive director of the International Spy Museum in Washington, Srodes also appeared in a multi-city speaking tour tied to the Tercentenary showings on Ben Franklin-Super Spy. Srodes's 2000 biography of the CIA architect and longest serving director, Allen Dulles: Master of Spies, was named the best intelligence book of that year by the Association of Former Intelligence Officers. His first book was the 1982 international best-seller, Dream Maker: The Rise and Fall of John Z. DeLorean, about the controversial automobile developer. That book was optioned as a potential film written by James Toback. Following publication, the indicted carmaker's defense lawyers subpoenaed Srodes, because they wanted him to name the law enforcement agents with whom he talked about John DeLorean’s alleged trafficking in cocaine.

Other books co-authored by Srodes include Takeovers, 1986; and Campaign 1996: Who’s Who in the Race for the White House, 1996.

Srodes was a founder and past president of Washington Independent Writers, the area advocacy group for freelance journalists.

== Works Published ==
- Spies in Palestine: Love, Betrayal and the Heroic Life of Sarah Aaronsohn (2016, Counterpoint Press) (ISBN 978-1619026131)
- On Dupont Circle: Franklin and Eleanor Roosevelt and the Progressives Who Shaped Our World (2013, softcover 2013, Counterpoint Press) (ISBN 978-1582437163) and (ISBN 978-1619021655)
- Franklin, The Essential Founding Father (2002, softcover 2003, Regnery History) (ISBN 978-0895261632) and (ISBN 978-0895261045)
- Allen Dulles: Master of Spies (2000, 2001, Regnery Publishing) (ISBN 978-0895263148) and (ISBN 978-0895262233)
- Campaign 1996: Who’s Who in the Race for the White House (1996, HarperCollins) (ISBN 978-0061009938)
- Dream Maker: The Rise and Fall of John Z. DeLorean (1986, Putnam Publishing Group) (ISBN 978-0399128219)
- Takeovers (1986, H. Hamilton) (ISBN 978-0241120736)
