= Tamar Eshel =

Israeli politician (1920–2022)

- תמר אשל
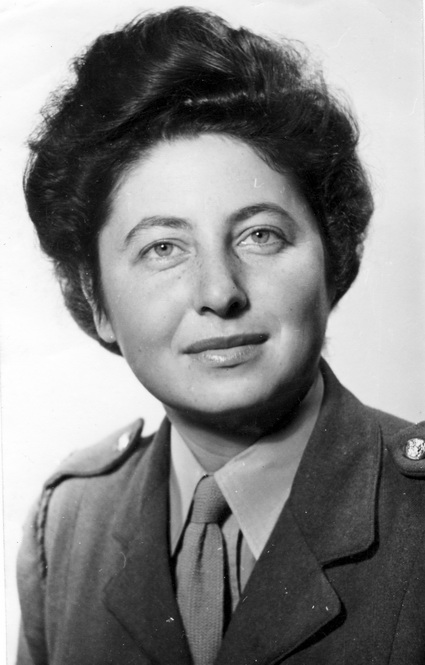

Faction represented in the Knesset
- 1977–1984: Alignment

Personal details
- Born: Tamar Finkelstein; 24 July 1920 London, England
- Died: 24 July 2022 (aged 102) Jerusalem

Tamar Eshel (Hebrew: תמר אשל; 24 July 1920 – 24 July 2022) was an Israeli diplomat and politician.

== Biography ==
She was born Tamar Finkelstein in London, while her parents were emissaries of the Jewish Agency in England. She returned with them to Mandatory Palestine in 1923. Her mother was a member of the well-known Feinberg and Belkind families, and a sister of Avshalom Feinberg. Her father was among the first attorneys in the territory. Upon their return to Palestine, they settled in Haifa, where Eshel graduated from the Hebrew Reali School. She went on to study oriental studies at the University of London.

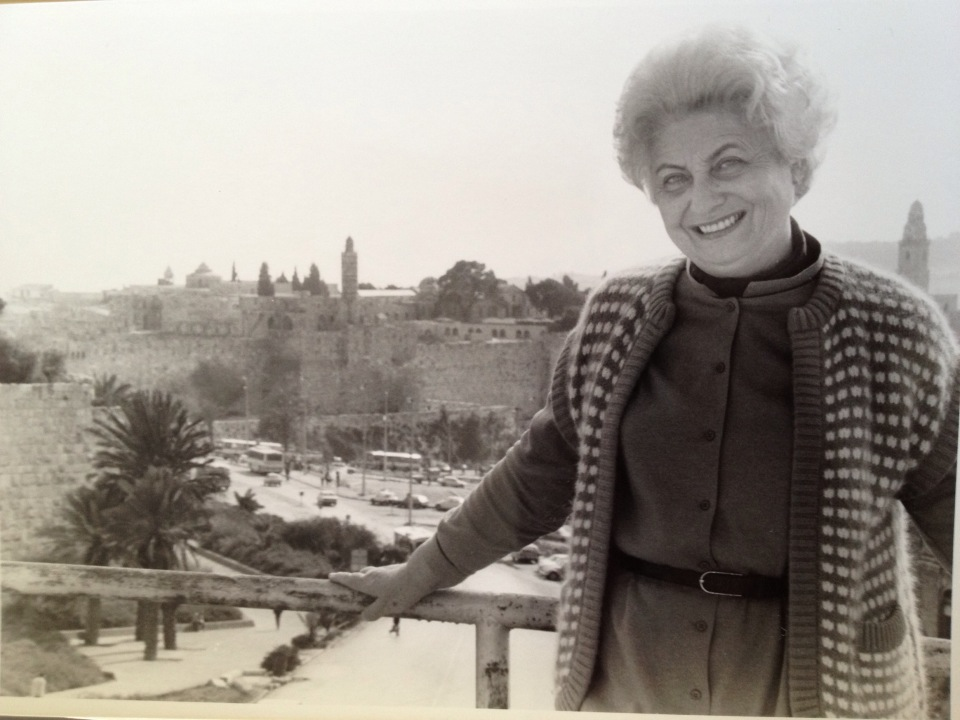
Tamar Eshel in Jerusalem, 1977

While in London, she was active with the Haganah, and in the 1940s, she headed its immigration office in France.

== Diplomatic and political career ==
Following the establishment of Israel in 1948, she began working in Jerusalem for the Ministry of Foreign Affairs. Eshel represented the ministry in its delegations to the United Nations, and held various positions on its behalf in the Prime Minister's Office. In 1968, towards her retirement from the ministry, she was given the title of Ambassador.

In the 1970s, Eshel served as a member of Jerusalem City Council, and as deputy mayor to Teddy Kollek. She was also head of the Na'amat women's organization, until her election to the Knesset on the Alignment list in 1977. She retained her seat in the 1981 elections, and remained in office until the 1984 elections.

== Personal life ==
Eshel died on 24 July 2022, her 102nd birthday.
