= Nava Macmel-Atir =

Israeli author, playwright and poet (born 1964)

- נאוה מקמל-עתיר
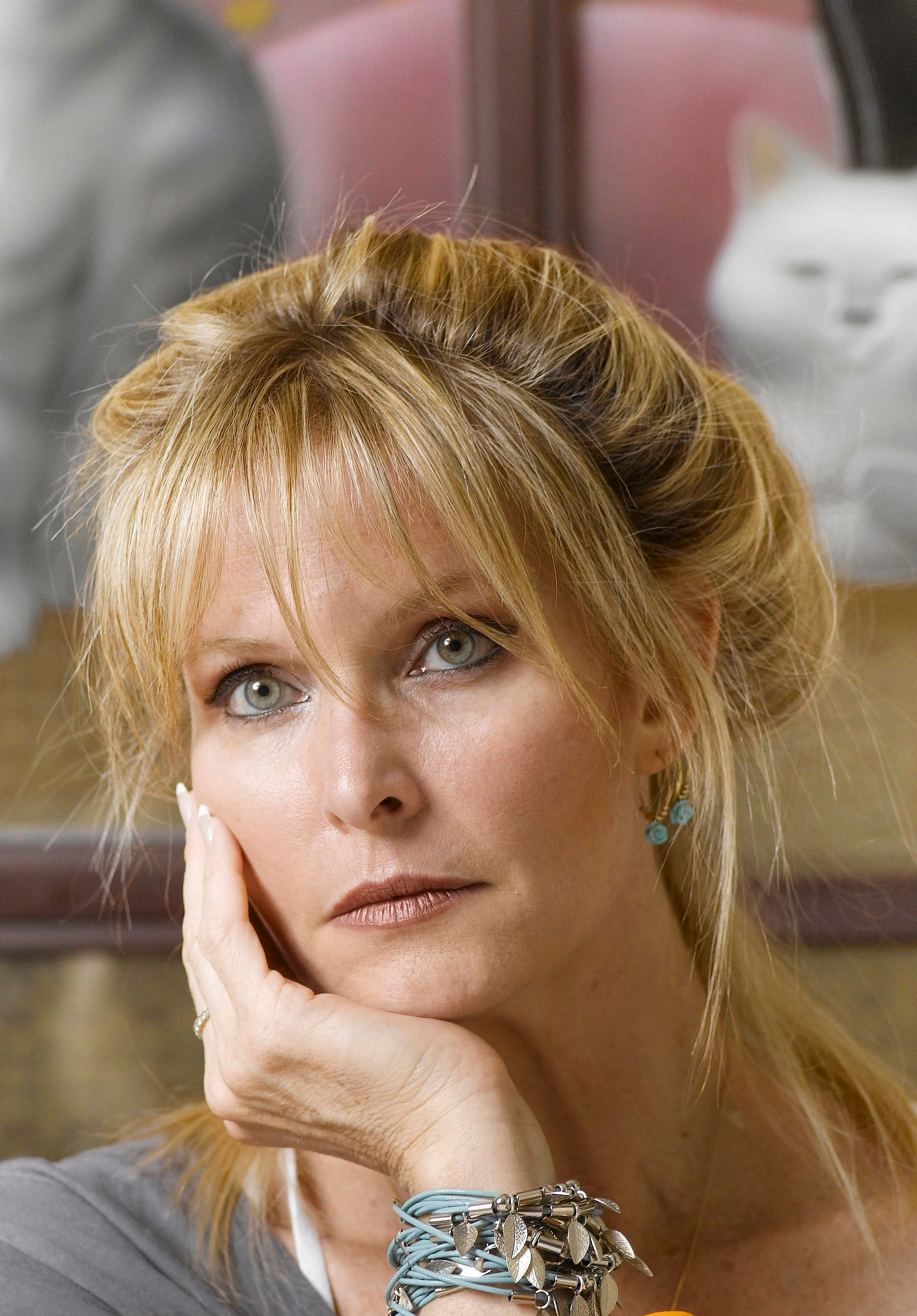
- Israeli author Nava Macmel-Atir, 2010
- Born: 27 August 1964 (age 61); Ramat Gan, Israel
- Citizenship: Israeli
- Occupation: Author
- Writing career
- Language: Hebrew
- Years active: 1990–present
- Genres: Children's literature Novels
- Notable works: Ot me-Avshalom; Adi's Jewel
- Notable awards: Golden, Platinum and Diamond book commemorations
- Website: www.navamacmelatir.co.il

Nava Macmel-Atir (Hebrew: נאוה מקמל-עתיר; born 27 August 1964) is an Israeli author, playwright and poet. She is best known for her books Adi's Jewel (Hebrew: העדי של עדי) and Ot me-Avshalom (Hebrew: אות מאבשלום).

== Biography ==
Nava Macmel-Atir was born in Ramat Gan, Israel.

== Literary career ==
In her twenties Macmel-Atir wrote poetry for a children's column in Yedioth Ahronoth newspaper. On Yom Hazikaron (Israel's National Memorial Day for the Fallen Soldiers of Israel and Victims of Terrorism) 1990, "7 Days" (Hebrew: שבעה ימים), the weekend supplement of the paper, published an interview with her about her poem "Micha Shuv" (Hebrew: מיכה שוב), which she wrote in memory of Micha Granit, who fell in the Yom Kippur War,

In 2000, Macmel-Atir published her first book, Ayelet Diving (Hebrew: איילת צוללת). One of her most highly acclaimed books was Adi's Jewel (Hebrew: העדי של עדי), based on the true story of a Holocaust survivor, which she later adapted into a play. The book was awarded a special commendation at the Ze'ev Prize awards and won third place on the Israeli Ministry of Education National Children's Books Chart and the Israeli Book Publishers Association.

Her book King of the Mountain (Hebrew: מלך ההר), published in 2004 in commemoration of the 100-year anniversary of the death of Theodor Herzl, is also based on a true story of Macmel-Atir's former classmate who died in a helicopter accident. It was also later made into a play.

In 2005, Macmel-Atir again received the Ze'ev Prize, for her book Right of Passage (Hebrew: מבחן קבלה). Adi's Jewel, The Final Delay (Hebrew: האיחור האחרון), King of the Mountain, and Right of Passage all achieved high rankings on the Israeli Ministry of Education national children's book chart and were adapted into theatre productions.

Until 2005, for more than a decade, Macmel-Atir taught literature at Ramat Gan's Blich High School. She now hosts youth writing workshops at Tel Aviv's Beit Ariela Library.

Her book The Girl From the Opposite Balcony (Hebrew: הנערה במרפסת ממול) was published in 2006 and adapted into a play in which Macmel-Atir played one of the parts.

Her second adult novel, Ot me-Avshalom (Hebrew: אות מאבשלום) was published in 2009 by Yediot Books and became a bestseller, for which Macmel-Atir received the Golden Book Prize for selling 20,000 copies in just three months after its release. Half a year after its publication, Ot me-Avshalom won the Platinum Book Prize from the Book Publishers Association of Israel for selling 40,000 copies. Macmel-Atir was voted one of the Top 50 Most Influential Women in 2010 by Lady Globes magazine. In June 2015, Ot me-Avshalom won the Diamond Book Prize for selling 100,000 copies.

== Published works ==
=== Adult ===
- Ot me-Avshalom (Hebrew: אות מאבשלום) – ISBN 978-965-482-889-5
- The Girl in the Opposite Balcony (Hebrew: הנערה במרפסת ממול) – ISBN 978-965-482-356-2

=== Children ===
- Surprises Knocking at the Door (Hebrew: הפתעות דופקות בדלת) – OCLC 457112669
- Chocolate Cubes (Hebrew: קוביות של שוקולד) – ISBN 978-965-545-628-8
- Transparent (Hebrew: שקופה) – ISBN 978-965-545-358-4
- Adi's Jewel (Hebrew: העדי של עדי) – ISBN 978-965-448-750-4
- King of the Mountain (Hebrew: מלך ההר) – ISBN 978-965-511-680-9
- The Final Delay (Hebrew: האיחור האחרון) – ISBN 978-965-511-169-9
- Caesar of the Neighbourhood (Hebrew: קיסר השכונה) – ISBN 978-965-545-785-8
- A Point for Thought (Hebrew: נקודה למחשבה) – ISBN 978-965-482-951-9
- Thousand Thousand Reader's Series (Hebrew: סדרת קוראים אלף אלף)
- The Life of a Pea (Hebrew: גילגולו של אפון) – OCLC 754763638
- Ayelet Diving (Hebrew: איילת צוללת) – OCLC 745221006
- The Friends from the Left Drawer (Hebrew: החברים מהמגרה השמאלית) – OCLC 233196101
- It All Started With a Button (Hebrew: הכל התחיל מכפתור) – ISBN 978-965-448-675-0
- The House on the Edge of Town (Hebrew: הבית שקצה העיר) – OCLC 152688801
- Creature in the Middle of the Night (Hebrew: יצור באמצע הלילה) – OCLC 745324144
- No Princes During the Feast (Hebrew: אין נסיכים בשעת הסעודה) – OCLC 61660678
- Brothers Not Allowed (Hebrew: אסור להביא אחים) – OCLC 233360672
- The Boy Who Stood at the Window (Hebrew: הילד שעמד בחלון) – OCLC 39680329
- Right of Passage (Hebrew: מבחן קבלה) – ISBN 978-965-511-684-7
