= Atlit (modern town) =

Atlit: עַתְלִית (Hebrew); عتليت (Arabic)

Hebrew transcription(s)
  - Unofficial: Atlith
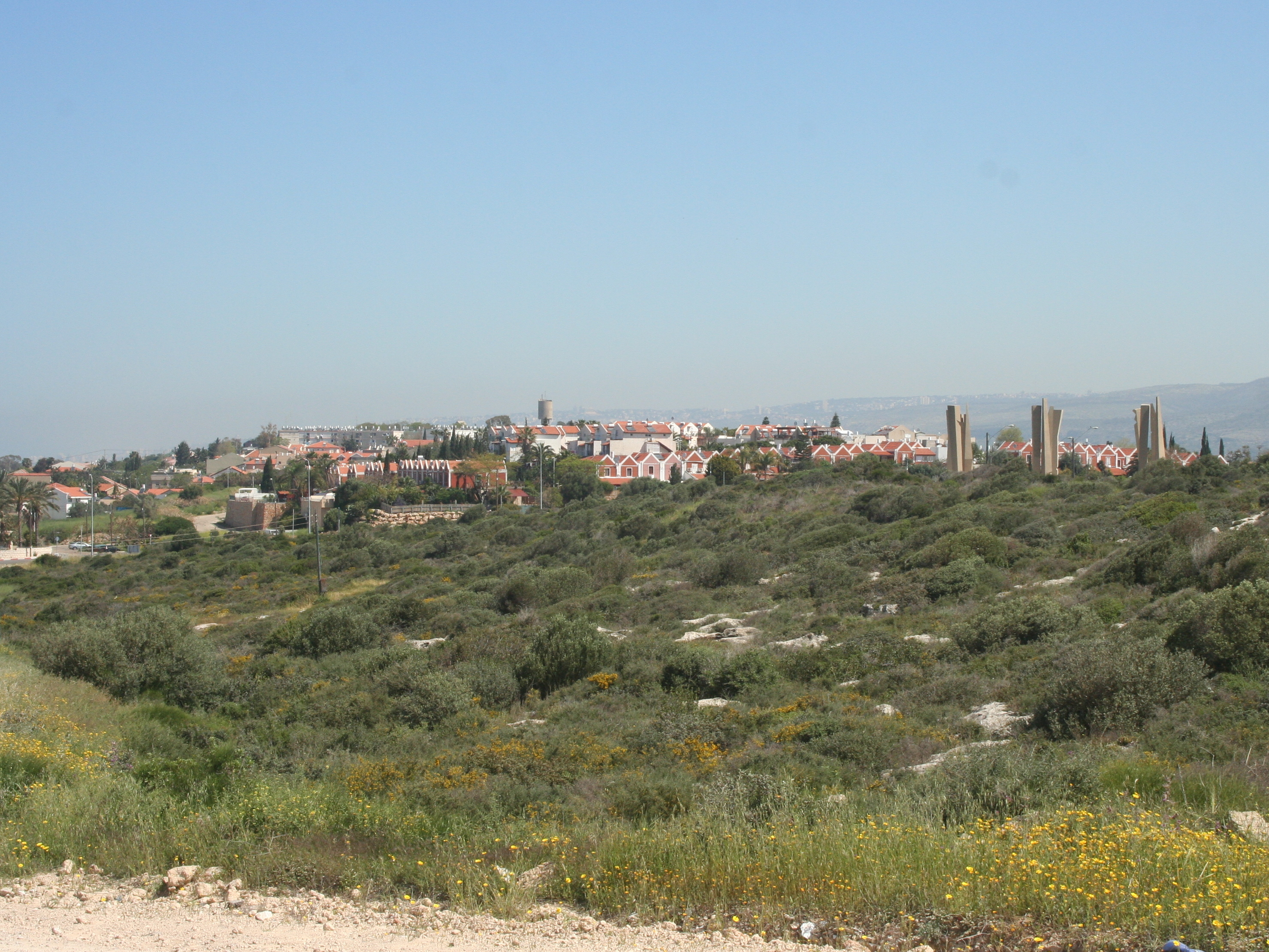
- Atlit

- Location within Haifa region of Israel Location within Israel
- Coordinates: 32°41′14″N 34°56′18″E
- Grid position: formerly 144/234, now 144/232 PAL
- Country: Israel
- District: Haifa
- Subdistrict: Hadera
- Council: Hof HaCarmel
- Founded: 6900 BCE (Atlit Yam); 13th century(Oirat village); 19th century(Arab village); 1903 (Jewish village settlement); 1948 (Israeli town)
- Population (2024): 11,611

Atlit (Hebrew: עַתְלִית, Arabic: عتليت) is a coastal town located south of Haifa, Israel. The community is in the Hof HaCarmel Regional Council in the Haifa District of Israel.

Off the coast of Atlit is a submerged Neolithic village. The town of Atlit is named after the nearby Crusader outpost and fortified town of Atlit, also known as Château Pèlerin, which although in ruins remained populated until 1948.

The town was established in 1903 under the auspices of Baron Edmond de Rothschild, approximately two kilometers south of the historical site which was then a small Palestinian village. The Atlit detainee camp is nearby, which was used by the British to intern Jewish refugees and is now a museum. From 1950 until the unification of the municipalities in 2003, Atlit was a local council whose jurisdiction was 14,000 dunams. In 2024 the population was 11,611.

== History ==
=== Neolithic ===
Atlit Yam is an ancient submerged Neolithic village off the coast of Atlit. Atlit-Yam provides the earliest known evidence for an agro-pastoral-marine subsistence system on the Levantine coast.

=== Bronze Age ===
Atlit shows evidence of human habitation since the early Bronze Age.

=== Crusader period ===
The Crusaders built the historical settlement of Atlit, also known as Château Pèlerin. It was one of the largest citadels in the Holy Land, and became the last remaining Crusader outpost (see also: Fall of Ruad), remaining in Crusader's hands until 1291.

The ruins of the citadel are still visible in modern times. Immediately to the north also lies a large medieval Christian cemetery hosting the graves of men, women and children who lived in the surrounding during the 13th century.

=== Foundation ===
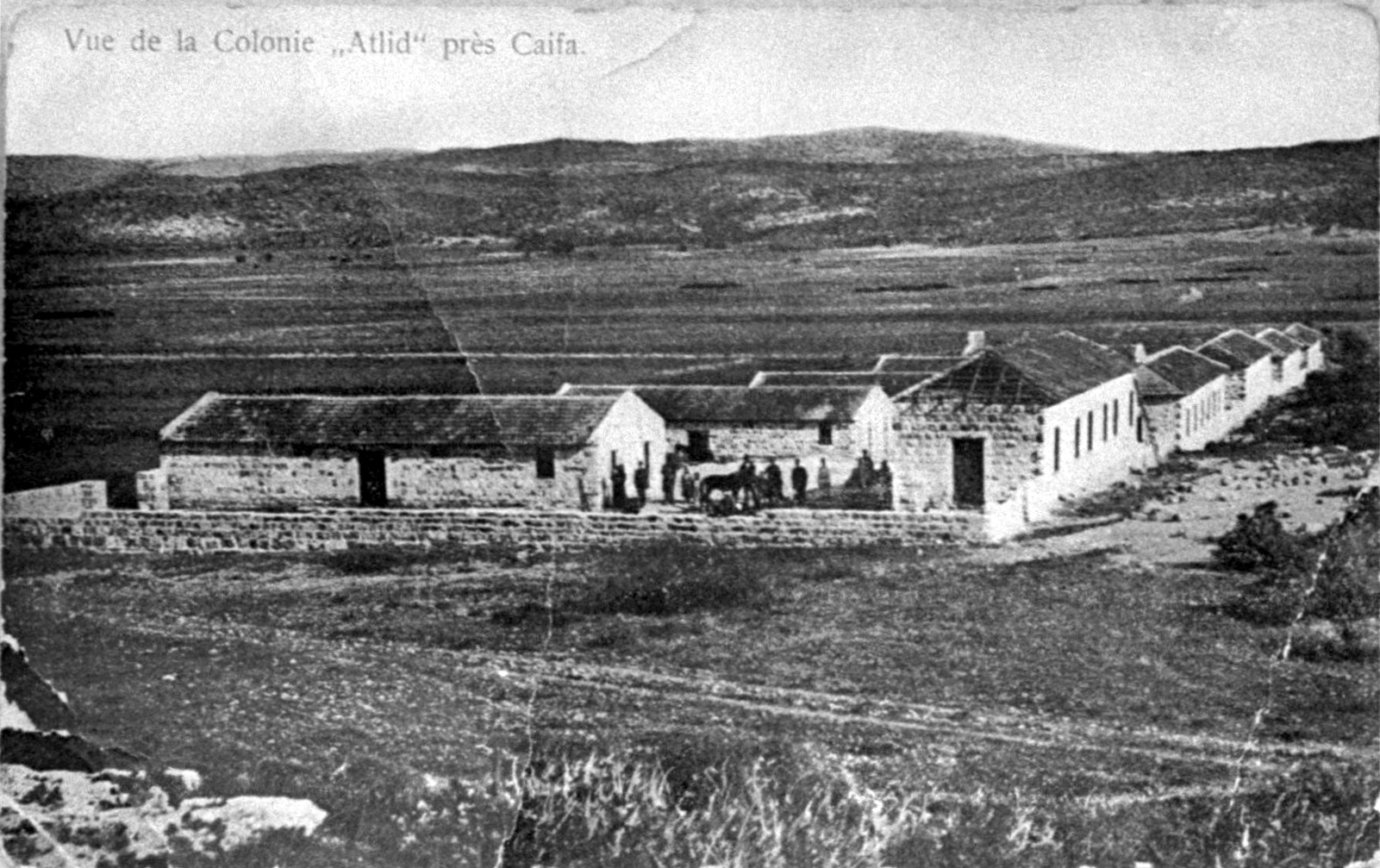
Atlit Jewish colony, 1903

In 1903, Jewish immigrants began to build a nearby village approximately 2 km south of the ancient site which they also called Atlit. The village was established by Edmond James de Rothschild, with most of the land bought from Arab fishermen. A hundred families settled there but much of it was swampland, and many residents succumbed to malaria. Aaron Aaronsohn established an agricultural station in Atlit in 1911, and during World War I the village was used as a base by the Nili organisation.

=== British Mandate period ===
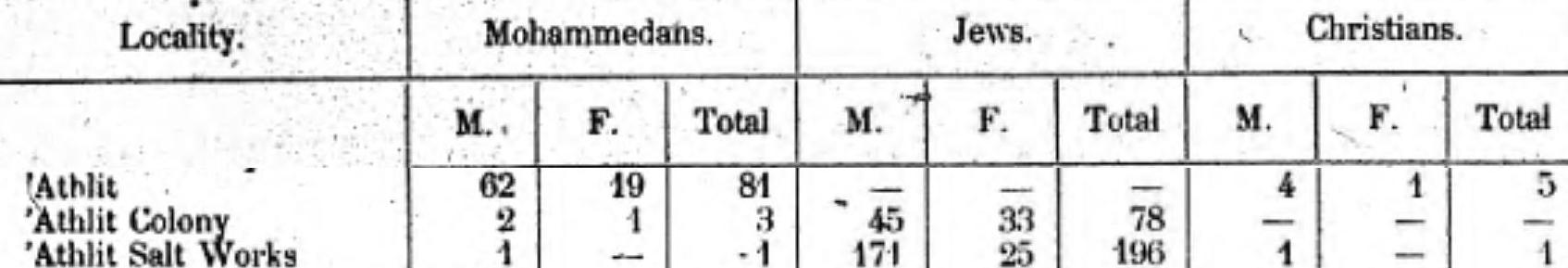
1922 census of Palestine: the first "Athlit" shown refers to the settlement at historical Atlit (Château Pèlerin).

In the 1922 census of Palestine, during the British Mandate of Palestine period Athlit Colony had a population of 78 Jews and 3 Muslims, while Athlit Salt works had a population of 196 Jews, 1 Muslim and 1 Christian.

The population of the wider had increased in the 1931 census to 413 Muslims, 496 Jews and 39 Christians; in a total of 193 houses; in addition to historical Atlit, this included Atlit Salt Co., Atlit Labour Group, Atlit Quarry, Aaronson Farm, Atlit Station and Atlit Police Post.

The Arab presence underwent a sharp decline in the 1940s due to land sales, so that by the 1945 statistics there were only 150 Arabs still living there (90 Muslims and 60 Christians) alongside 510 Jews.

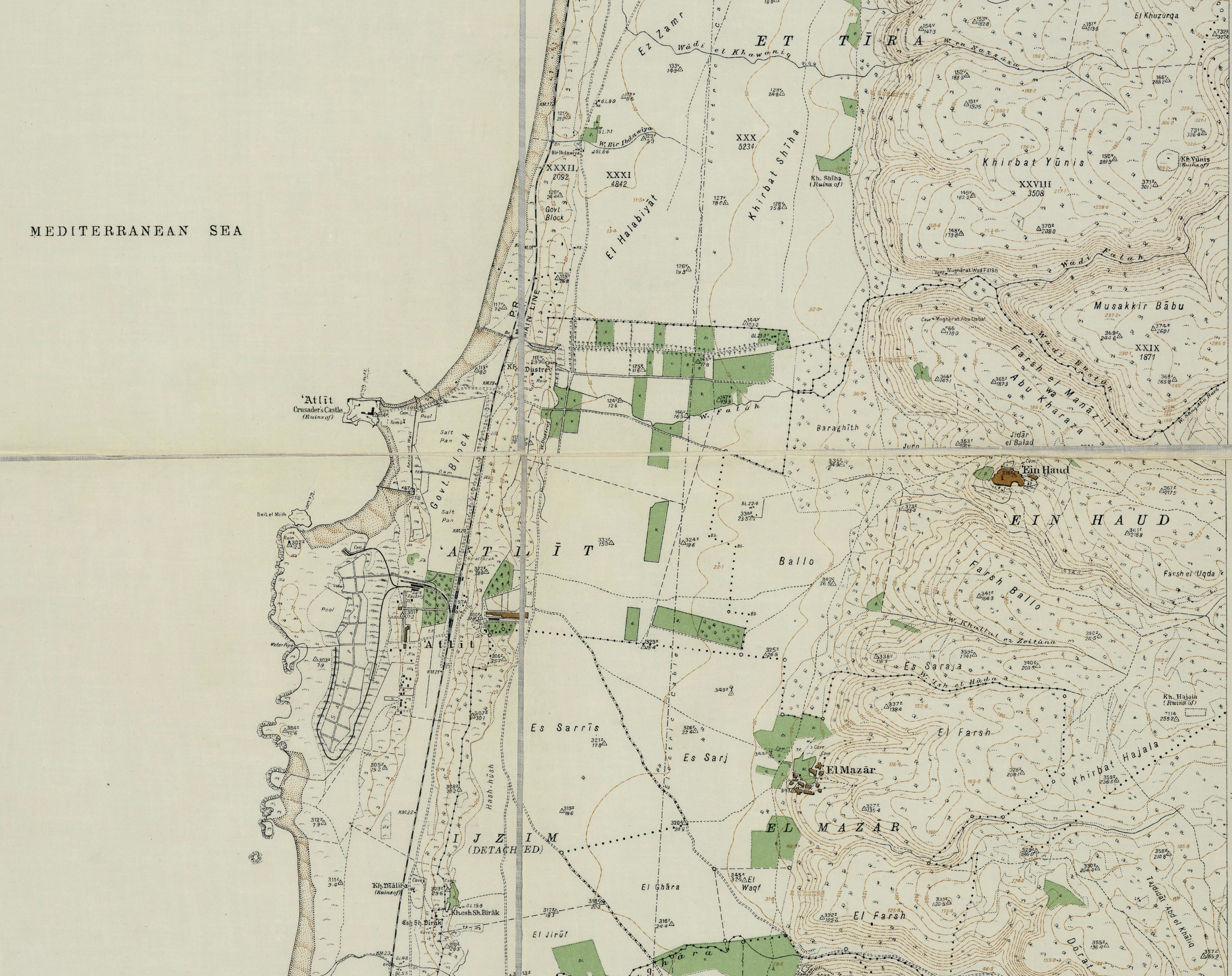
Atlit 1932 Survey of Palestine 1:20,000

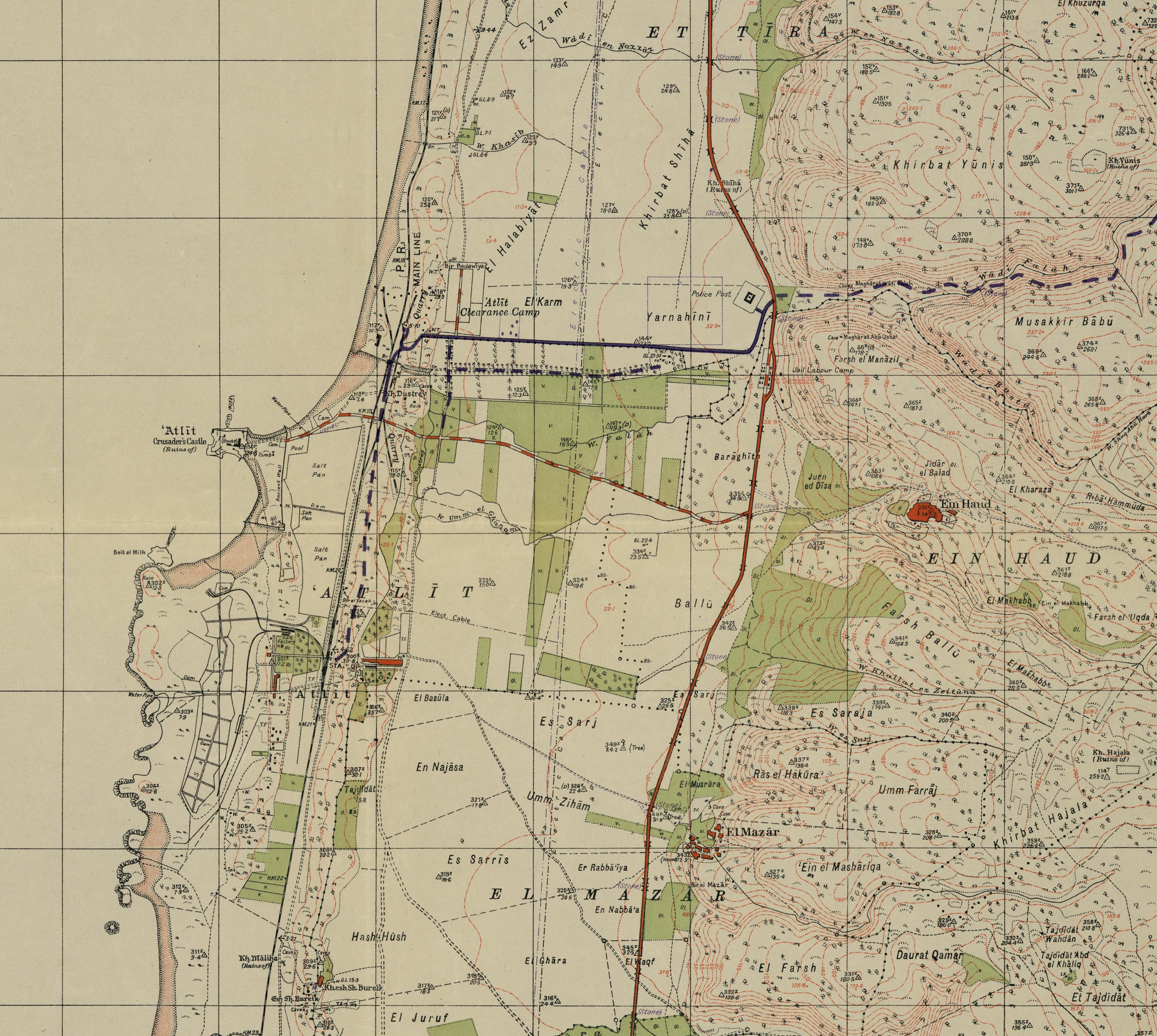
Atlit 1942 (including clearance camp) Survey of Palestine 1:20,000

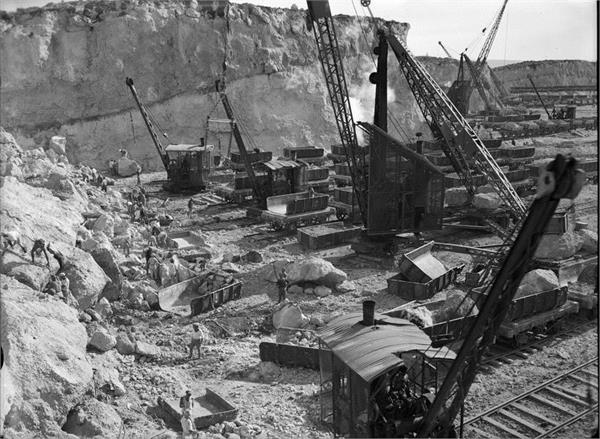
Atlit quarry 1934. Stone used in construction of Haifa harbour

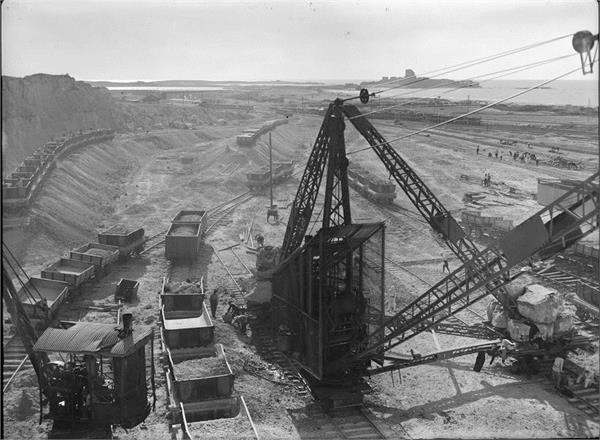
Atlit: Quarry with fortress in distance 1934

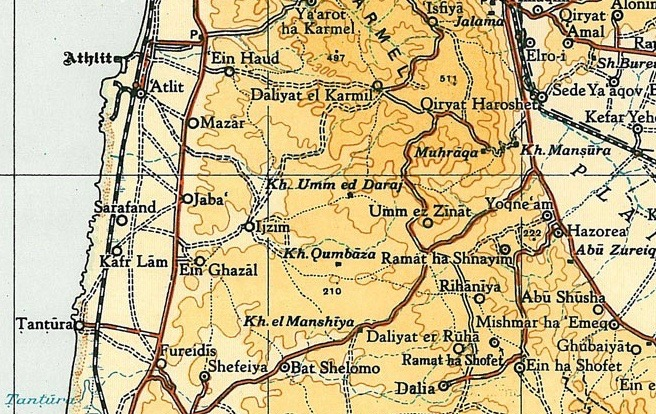
Atlit 1945 Survey of Palestine 1:250,000

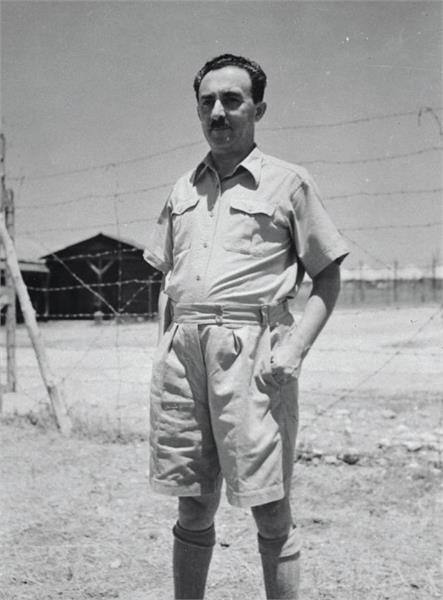
Atlit: Moshe Sharett interned in camp 1947

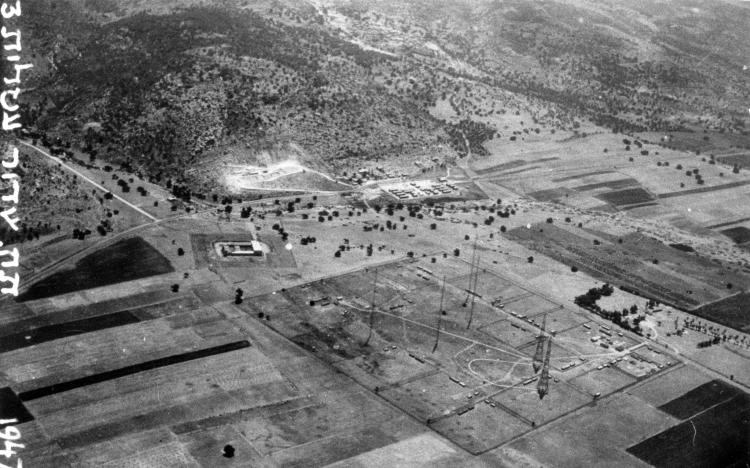
Atlit. Immigrant detention camp & quarry beyond broadcasting station

=== State of Israel ===
The circumstances under which the remaining Arabs left in 1948 are unknown. The Atlit detainee camp was used by the British authorities to detain Jewish migrants to Palestine.

It is now a museum of the Ha'apala (illegal Jewish immigration 1934–48). The headquarters of Shayetet 13 marine commandos is located at Atlit naval base on the Atlit promontory, placing the Crusader ruins there off-limits for regular visitors.

Atlit was declared a local council in 1950, but in 2004 was incorporated in the Hof HaCarmel Regional Council as one of a handful of Regional Councils. The late Knesset member Pesah Grupper lived in Atlit. He was head of its local council in the years 1959–1962 and 1969–1971.

=== Archaeology ===
In August 2021, marine archeologists headed by Yaakov Sharvit from Israel Antiquities Authority announced the discovery of 1,700-year-old coins weighing a total of 6 kg., dated back to the 4th century AD. According to Sharvit, coins demonstrated that they were assembled together and agglutinated because of oxidation of the metals.

== Wildlife ==
Flamingos heading to Africa for the winter make migration stops in Atlit.

== Neighborhoods ==
Neighborhoods in Atlit are Neve Moshe, Yamit, Giv'at HaPrahim, Giv'at HaBrekhot, Giv'at Sharon, Shoshanat HaYam, HaGoren, Yafe Nof, Argaman, Hofit, Savyonei Atlit and Allon. Atlit is in immediate vicinity of the villages Neve Yam and Ein Carmel.

== Demographics ==
Historical population
Year	Pop.	±%
1972	2,300	—
1983	2,400	+4.3%
1995	3,900	+62.5%
2008	5,000	+28.2%
2022	10,658	+113.2%
2024	11,611	+8.9%

== Voting Patterns ==
In the 2022 election, 54 percent of voters in Atlit voted for the parties of the center-left coalition led by Yair Lapid, while 43 percent voted for the parties of the right-wing coalition led by Benjamin Netanyahu and 0.7 percent voted for the Arab parties.

In the 2026 election, 55 percent of voters in Atlit voted for the parties of the center-left coalition led by Gadi Eisenkot, while 37 percent voted for the parties of the right-wing coalition led by Benjamin Netanyahu and 0.5 percent voted for the Arab parties. An additional 4.2 percent voted for the Reservists, and 2.5 percent voted for Amcha Yisrael. Voter turnout increased 24 percent from the 2022 election.

== Twin towns ==
- Nardò (Italy)

== See also ==
- Atlit naval base

== Bibliography ==
- Abu-Husayn, Abdul-Rahim (1985). Provincial Leaderships in Syria, 1575–1650. Beirut: American University of Beirut. ISBN 9780815660729. OCLC 242675094.
- Barron, J. B., ed. (1923). Palestine: Report and General Abstracts of the Census of 1922. Government of Palestine.
- Conder, C.R.; Kitchener, H.H. (1881). The Survey of Western Palestine: Memoirs of the Topography, Orography, Hydrography, and Archaeology. Vol. 1. London: Committee of the Palestine Exploration Fund. p. 281
- Department of Statistics (1945). Village Statistics, April, 1945. Government of Palestine.
- Hartmann, M. (1883). "Die Ortschaftenliste des Liwa Jerusalem in dem türkischen Staatskalender für Syrien auf das Jahr 1288 der Flucht (1871)". Zeitschrift des Deutschen Palästina-Vereins. 6: 102–149.
- Hadawi, S. (1970). Village Statistics of 1945: A Classification of Land and Area ownership in Palestine. Palestine Liberation Organization Research Center. Archived from the original on 2018-12-08.
- Irby, C.L.; Mangles, J. (1823). Travels in Egypt and Nubia, Syria, and Asia Minor; during the years 1817 & 1818. London: Printed for Private Distribution by T. White & Co. Irby and Mangles, 1823, p. 191
- Khalidi, W. (1992). All That Remains: The Palestinian Villages Occupied and Depopulated by Israel in 1948. Washington D.C.: Institute for Palestine Studies. ISBN 0-88728-224-5.
- Karmon, Y. (1960). "An Analysis of Jacotin's Map of Palestine" (PDF). Israel Exploration Journal. 10 (3, 4): 155–173, 244–253. Archived from the original (PDF) on 2019-12-22.
- Mills, E., ed. (1932). Census of Palestine 1931. Population of Villages, Towns and Administrative Areas. Jerusalem: Government of Palestine.
- Morris, B. (2004). The Birth of the Palestinian Refugee Problem Revisited. Cambridge University Press. ISBN 978-0-521-00967-6.
- Palmer, E. H. (1881). The Survey of Western Palestine: Arabic and English Name Lists Collected During the Survey by Lieutenants Conder and Kitchener, R. E. Transliterated and Explained by E.H. Palmer. Committee of the Palestine Exploration Fund.
- Robinson, David M. (2020). In the Shadow of the Mongol Empire Ming China and Eurasia. Cambridge: Cambridge University Press. ISBN 978-1-108-48244-8.
- Schumacher, G. (1888). "Population list of the Liwa of Akka". Quarterly Statement - Palestine Exploration Fund. 20: 169–191.
- Socin, A. (1879). "Alphabetisches Verzeichniss von Ortschaften des Paschalik Jerusalem". Zeitschrift des Deutschen Palästina-Vereins. 2: 135–163.
