= Antisemitism in Turkey =

Antisemitism in Turkey refers to historical and contemporary acts and sentiments of hostility, prejudice, or discrimination directed against Jews as individuals or as a community, based on their religion, ethnicity, culture, or perceived identity in Turkey.

== Demographics ==
Jews have lived in the territory comprising modern Turkey for over 2,400 years. Initially, the population consisted of Greek-speaking Romaniote Jews, but the Romaniotes gradually assimilated into the Sephardic Jewish community. The Sephardic community began migrating from the Iberian Peninsula to the Ottoman Empire's territory in the 15th century as a result of the persecution of Jews and Muslims by Manuel I of Portugal, the expulsion of Jews from Spain, the Spanish Inquisition, and the Portuguese Inquisition.

Although Jews constituted only approximately 0.03% of the Turkish population in 2009, the Republic of Türkiye nevertheless houses one of the largest Jewish diaspora communities in the Muslim world. The population of Turkish Jews was counted at 23,000 in 2009 and between 10,000 and 14,000 in 2022; the community is declining. The majority of Jews in Turkey reside in Istanbul. As of 2010, there were 23 active synagogues in Turkey, including 16 in Istanbul alone. Historically, the Jewish population of the Ottoman Empire reached its apex at the end of the 19th century, when Jews numbered around 500,000 individuals, of which approximately half lived in the territory of modern Turkey.

Although Jews form a very small portion of the Turkish population today, antisemitic sentiment is widespread among modern-day Turks. Public criticism of Israel in Turkey frequently turns into expressions of general antisemitic sentiment.

Since 2009, the Jewish population has declined. By September 2010, the population had dropped to about 17,000 people, mainly due to emigration to Israel precipitated by security concerns from increasing antisemitism sentiments following incidents such as the 2006 Lebanon War, the 2008–2009 Gaza War, and the May 2010 Gaza flotilla raid in which nine Turkish citizens were killed by Israeli Navy commandos boarding the flotilla ships to uphold the maritime blockade of the Gaza Strip.

== Historical status of Jews in Turkey ==
=== Jews and antisemitism in the Ottoman Empire ===
In accordance with Islamic law (Sharia), Jews in the Ottoman Empire were considered dhimmis, which subordinated them to Muslims. However, the status of dhimmi guaranteed Jews personal inviolability and freedom of religion. That said, dhimmitude did not prevent antisemitism in Ottoman Turkey.

The first Ottoman case of blood libel—that is, claims of Jews abducting and sacrificing non-Jews in sinister rituals—was reported during the reign of Sultan Mehmed II in the 15th century (according to other sources, at the beginning of the 16th century). Subsequently, and despite the mass migration of Jews from Spain in 1492, such blood libels occurred rarely and were usually condemned by Ottoman authorities. Some Jewish sources mention blood libel incidents during the reign of Sultan Murad IV. Sultan Mehmed II issued a firman (a royal decree) that was the first of its kind in the Ottoman Empire: He ordered that all cases related to the blood libel should be considered by the Divan, the highest council of the Empire.

In general, the Alhambra Decree and subsequent migration of Jews from Western Europe to the Ottoman Empire were welcomed by the authorities. In 1553, Sultan Suleiman the Magnificent, taking up the opinion of his personal physician and adviser, Moses Hamon, reconfirmed the orders of Mehmed II, which prohibited local courts from adjudicating the cases about alleged Jewish ritual murder. He also successfully counter-measured the intention of Pope Paul IV to place the Jews of Ancona into the hands of the Inquisition.

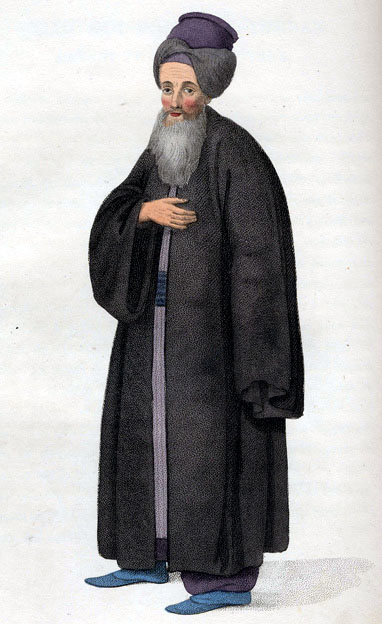
Painting of a Jewish man from the Ottoman Empire, 1779.

However, later, the attitude of the authorities towards the Jews deteriorated. In 1579, Sultan Murad III reportedly heard that Jewish women wore silk clothes decorated with gemstones and ordered the destruction of all Jews in the Empire. Even though the decree was lifted, thanks to Solomon Ashkenazi, the adviser to the grand vizier, special clothing was ordered for Jews to wear. In particular, women were forbidden to wear silk, and men were required to wear the so-called Jewish hat.

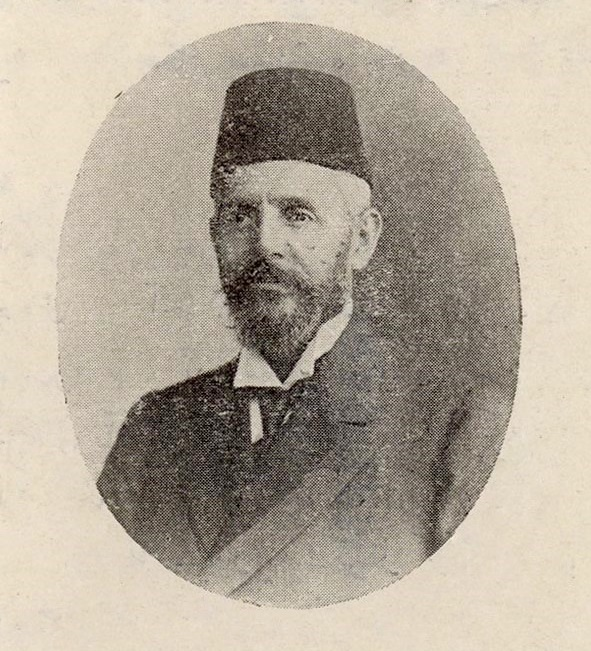
Emmanuel Carasso, lawyer and a member of the prominent Sephardic Jewish Carasso family of Ottoman Salonica (now Thessaloniki, Greece).

There were a number of known cases of blood libel in the 19th century on the territory of the Ottoman Empire: Aleppo (1810), Beirut (1824), Antioch (1826), Hama (1829), Tripoli (1834), Jerusalem (1838), Rhodes and Damascus (1840), Marmora (1843), Smyrna (1864). The most famous of them were the Rhodes blood libel and Damascus affair in 1840, both of which had major international repercussions.

A blood libel in Rhodes occurred in February 1840, when the Greek Orthodox Church, with the active participation of the consuls of several European states, accused the Jews of kidnapping and murdering a Christian boy for ritual purposes. The Ottoman governor of Rhodes supported the accusation. Several Jews were arrested, some of whom have made self-incriminating confessions under torture, and the entire Jewish quarter was blocked for twelve days. In July 1840, the Jewish community of Rhodes was formally acquitted of accusations.

In the same year, the Damascus affair took place, in which Jews were accused of the ritual murder of father Thomas, a Franciscan friar from the Island of Sardinia and his Greek servant, Ibrahim Amarah. Four members of the Jewish community died under torture, and the matter resulted in international outrage. British politician Sir Moses Montefiore intervened to clear the remaining imprisoned Jews and persuaded Sultan Abdülmecid I to issue a decree on 6 November 1840, declaring that blood libel accusations is a slander against Jews and to be prohibited throughout the Ottoman Empire. The decree read:

"We cannot permit the Jewish nation... to be vexed and tormented upon accusations, which have not the least foundation in truth..."

In 1866, with the resumption of cases of blood libel, the Sultan Abdulaziz issued a firman, according to which the Jews were declared to be under his protection. Orthodox clergy limited such accusations thereafter. Another known case of blood libel happened in 1875 in Aleppo, but the alleged victim of the murder—an Armenian boy—was soon found alive and well.

In the second half of the 19th century, the Ottoman Empire initiated the Tanzimat reforms aimed at aligning the rights among its subjects regardless of ethnic origin and religion. These transformations positively affected the Jews, who finally acquired equal rights. In the beginning of the 20th century, the Jewish population in the Empire had reached 400–500,000 people. In 1887, there were five Jewish members in the Ottoman Parliament. However, actual equality under the law was not achieved by Jews until much later.

With the appearance of Zionism in the late 19th century, the attitude of Ottoman authorities towards Jews began losing its traditional tolerance, thus marking the first signs of modern Turkish antisemitism. There were also conflicts with local Muslims, especially in the area of present-day Israel. Towards the end of the 19th century, the Arab population protested against the increasing Jewish presence in Palestine, resulting in a ban in 1892 on all land sales to foreigners. Jews were forbidden to settle in Palestine or live in Jerusalem, regardless of whether they were subjects of the Empire or foreigners. Hostility to Jews grew with the increase in numbers of Jews in the region, and there was a major pogrom in Jaffa in March 1908, in which the Arab population participated and resulted in 13 people being seriously injured, several of whom died later. The local government was sacked.

During World War I, Jews were persecuted by the Ottoman Empire, as the Ottomans accused Jews of being British and Russian spies, greatly affecting the Aliyah and Yishuv community. Subsequently, the Ottomans issued the 1917 Jaffa deportation, in which thousands of Jews were expelled or died.

During the Greco-Turkish War of 1919–1922, the Jewish communities in Western Anatolia and Eastern Thrace were persecuted by the Greeks, and a pogrom occurred in Çorlu.

=== In the Republic of Turkey ===
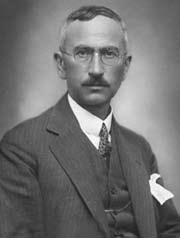
İbrahim Süreyya Yiğit, thinker and antisemitic writer, who wrote about the concept of the Varlık Vergisi law.

In 1923, when the creation of Turkish Republic was proclaimed, at that time there were 200,000 Jews living on its territory, including 100,000 in Istanbul alone. Jews were granted civil equality; however, the subsequent pogroms and persecution triggered a mass Jewish emigration, which reduced the Jewish community by 10 times.

In 1920, the opponents of the regime of Mustafa Kemal (Atatürk) launched an antisemitic campaign, claiming, besides classical antisemitic rhetoric, that the Jews supported Greek interests in the Turkish War of Independence and illegally appropriated abandoned property. The campaign did not find widespread support and ultimately ceased with the stabilization of Mustafa Kemal's regime. In the same period the government forced the Jewish community to abandon the cultural autonomy granted to ethnic minorities, thereby violating the treaty of Lausanne, although this was the general policy of Mustafa Kemal's regime, which also affected Armenians and Kurds, among others.

On 2 July 1934, a pro-Nazi group headed by Cevat Rıfat Atilhan organized pogroms against Jews in Thrace. Authorities decisively stopped the anti-Jewish riots, announced a state of emergency in Eastern Thrace, and brought looters to justice. At the same time, some sources mention there was a forcible eviction of Jews from Eastern Thrace, based on the Law on Resettlement "(№ 2510). Under this law, the Interior Minister had the right to relocate national minorities to other parts of the country depending on the level of their "adaptation to Turkish culture". In particular, the Jews were expelled by Turkish authorities of the city of Edirne. In 1935, the Turkish Army bought 40,000 copies of Attilhans' antisemitic book Suzy Liberman, Jewish Spy and distributed them amongst the officers.

In 1939–1942, Turkey again saw antisemitic propaganda spreading that had seen support from Nazi Germany, in which the Turkish government did not intervene. In July 1942, power in Turkey was seized by right-wing politicians. On 11 November 1942, a law on tax on property (Varlık Vergisi) was ratified by the Turkish Parliament. The tax rate for Jews and Christians was 5 times greater than for Muslims. As a result, about 1,500 Jews were sent to labor camps for non-payment of taxes. The Act was repealed on 15 March 1944. Despite this, Turkey received substantial numbers of Jewish refugees during the rise of fascism in Europe in the 1930s and the Second World War. There were cases of Turkish diplomats in Europe aiding Jews in escaping the Holocaust.

From 1948 to 1955, approximately 37,000 Turkish Jews emigrated to Israel. One stated reason for emigration was pressure from authorities to use Turkish language even at home.

In 1950, Atilhan and other right-wing Turkish politicians, to a great extent, spread antisemitic propaganda through the media, some of which, though, were confiscated by the authorities. Attacks on Jews and antisemitic incidents were recorded in 1955, 1964, and 1967. Authorities took steps to protect the Jewish population.

In the 1970s–1980s, antisemitic sentiments in Turkey increased. Anti-Jewish theses existed in the programs of certain political parties. In the wake of the Turkish government's condemnation of the 2008–2009 Israel–Gaza conflict which strained relations between the two countries, a 2009 report issued by the Israeli Foreign Ministry said that Erdoğan "indirectly incites and encourages" antisemitism.

== In modern Turkey ==
A reviewer of the left-liberal Turkish daily Radikal, Murat Arman, in 2005 wrote that the situation in Turkey reminds him of 1930 in Germany, where the media often discussed the dominance of Jews in the economy, the assumption about their clandestine activities directed against Germany, and a harmful effect on German society. He believes that this is an extremely dangerous trend and that such a massive agitation against non-Muslims in Turkey has not been recorded for many years.

Some experts believe that the growth of antisemitism in Turkey is not taking place, but most agree that a number of hazards exist, in particular, the emergence of antisemitic posters and attempts to conduct antisemitic propaganda in the Turkish schools.

Since the outbreak of the Gaza war, antisemitism in Turkey has increased exponentially.

=== Sources of antisemitism ===
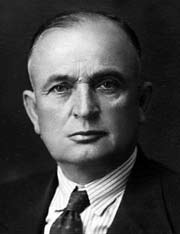
Mehmet Ali Okar, one of the early antisemitic thinkers.

Prominent antisemitic thinkers of the 1930s and 1940s included Burhan Belge, Cevat Rıfat Atilhan, Nihal Atsız, Sadri Ertem, and Muhittin Bergen.

The main ideological sources of antisemitism in Turkey are Islamism, left-wing anti-Zionism, and nationalist right-wing extremism. Turkish intellectuals have always been pro-Palestinian and anti-Israel in their stance, while the debate of the Middle East conflict among laymen in Turkey often turns antisemitic. Nefes argues that antisemitic currents are not mainstream in Turkish politics, while Turkish Jewry has been seen as outsiders in Turkish society. In other words, Turkish Jewry is not perceived as a local threat, but comes into consideration during relevant international conflicts as a suspicious non-native community.

In January 2010, Israeli newspaper Haaretz published a report prepared by the International Centre for Political Studies at the Ministry of Foreign Affairs of Israel, which argued that anti-Israeli statements by Turkish Prime Minister Recep Tayyip Erdoğan contributed to the growth of antisemitism in Turkish society.

==== Islamism ====
A Turkish specialist on inter-ethnic and inter-religious relations, Rıfat Bali and other sources state that Jews who converted to Islam are portrayed by Turkish Islamists as an alien group of questionable loyalty. Islamists, though, refer to groups such as liberals, secularists, and socialists as "Shabbethaians" when wishing to attribute to them disloyalty. For instance, the Great Eastern Islamic Raiders' Front (İslami Büyük Doğu Akıncıları Cephesi), a radical Islamist terrorist organization established in 1984, advocates the expulsion of any Jewish and Christian presence in Turkish political life.

According to researchers at Tel Aviv University, the Islamist Welfare Party was a major source of antisemitism in Turkey until 1997. According to the researchers, the leaders, including the former Prime Minister Necmettin Erbakan, have presented antisemitic claims in the critique of the state of Israel. In February 1997, an article in the party's newspaper filled with such rhetoric led to protests outside of the Turkish Embassy in Washington. The article stated:

"... a snake was created to express its poison, just as a Jew was created to make mischief."

In 1997, the secular parties came to power in Turkey, and the influence of the Welfare Party has since decreased significantly.

However, in 2003, when Recep Tayyip Erdoğan, a leader of the Islamist Justice and Development Party, became the Prime Minister of Turkey, it marked the beginning of an Islamisation of the Turkish society. Erdoğan was also to become known for harsh anti-Israeli rhetoric. After the Israeli operation Cast lead in the Gaza Strip and with the appointment of new Turkish Foreign Minister Ahmet Davutoğlu in 2009, anti-Israeli sentiments clearly became expressed in Turkish foreign policy.

Several sources claim that the conflict following the Gaza flotilla incident on 31 May 2010 was deliberately instigated by Turkish politicians in order to aggravate the relations with Israel for the sake of domestic and foreign policy gains.

Furthermore, according to news reports from December 2012, Turkey's National Intelligence Organization had started investigating individuals who may be dual citizens of Israel and Turkey in connection with the Mavi Marmara "Flotilla Incident" of 2010.

On 31 May 2015, a report from The Times of Israel revealed that almost 40% of the Turkish population views Israel as a threat, the highest percentage ever recorded, signalling the rampant rise of antisemitism in Turkey, a result of the widespread Turkish government's portrayal of Jewish people.

==== Anti-Israel and anti-Zionist sentiments on the left ====
Left-wing Turkish intellectuals tend to view Israel as an instrument of US imperialism in the Middle East. The Israeli-Palestinian conflict is thus interpreted as a conflict between a group of people which is being "oppressed by imperialism" and a proxy of the United States. This view has been espoused since the 1970s, when Turks who were members and supporters of the far-left joined the Palestine Liberation Organization and received military training from the said organization, and some of them participated in combat against Israeli forces.

The Turkish-Jewish scholar, Rıfat Bali, assessing the Turkish left-wing, says that for it, Zionism is an aggressive ideology that promotes antisemitism. In a special issue of the left-wing magazine Birikim which was published in 2004, it was asserted that antisemitism and Zionism are two sides of the same coin, "Jewish conscience was captured by Israel," and all efforts should be made for the destruction of Israel in its present form.

The head of the Jewish community in Turkey, Silvio Ovadia, said that "any anti-Israeli statements can easily turn into a condemnation of Jews in general. Whenever a war breaks out in the Middle East, the antisemitism grows throughout the world. He believes that many people are not able to distinguish between Israelis and Jews and transfer the criticism of Israeli policies onto the Turkish citizens of Jewish origin.

==== Nationalism and Nazi sympathy ====
At the end of March 2005, the attention of Western media was drawn towards Turkey to the fact that Adolf Hitler's Mein Kampf was running at 4th place on the Turkish best-seller lists for the first two months of 2005. Its low price ($4.50) made it affordable and drove high sales; from 50,000 to 100,000 copies of the book were sold. On that occasion, Turkish sociologist and political scientist Doğu Ergil stated that "Nazism, buried in Europe, is being resurrected in Turkey."

A columnist of the liberal-leaning national newspaper Hürriyet, Hadi Uluengin, wrote in February 2009 about a "new nationalist" antisemitism among secularists.

These groups fiercely criticized the government's plan to provide to an Israeli company a long-term lease of section of the Turkish land on the border with Syria in return for an expensive operation on de-mining of that section (which, after joining to the Mine Ban Treaty, Turkey was obliged to undertake until 2014). Opposition arguments on the inadmissibility of investment of the "Jewish finance" were commented by Prime Minister Erdoğan as "fascist" and as a "phobia towards minorities and foreigners."

In June 2010, during one of the anti-Israel demonstrations, protestors used Nazi symbols and slogans which glorified Adolf Hitler.

=== Antisemitic propaganda ===
==== Books, print media and theatre ====
Before the 2008–2009 Gaza War, most of the antisemitic manifestations in Turkey were in the print media and books. The researchers at Tel Aviv University noted that many young and educated Turks under the influence of this propaganda were forming a negative attitude towards Jews and Israel, although they had never come across them.

Some sources say that many antisemitic sentiments are being published in Islamist publications such as Vakit and Millî Gazete as well as in ultra Ortadoğu and Yeniçağ. For example, a famous Turkish writer Orhan Pamuk, who is prosecuted for public recognition of the Armenian genocide in Turkey, has been named by the newspaper Yeniçağ as "a lover of Jews", "the best friend of the Jews" and "servant of the Jews." Ortadoğu and Yeniçağ argued that well-known Kurdish leaders Mustafa Barzani and Jalal Talabani are Jews by birth and intend to create a "Greater Israel" under the guise of a Kurdish state. The magazine Vakit wrote that the Mossad and Israel are responsible for laying mines in southeastern Turkey, that is killing Turkish soldiers. Vakit and Millî Gazete published articles that praised Hitler and denied the Holocaust.

Vakit wrote that the Chief rabbi of Turkey must leave the country because he did not condemn the Israeli operation "Cast Lead". The publications in the media compared Israel to Nazi Germany, and the operation in Gaza to the Holocaust, the media puts an equal mark between the words "Jew" and "terrorist". Millî Gazete columnist expressed his desire never to see Jews on the streets of Turkish cities.

In Turkey, antisemitic books are published and freely distributed, such as The Protocols of the Elders of Zion, The International Jew by Henry Ford, and many others, including Turkish authors, who argue in their books that Jews and Israel want to seize power all over the world.

In 1974, as president of the Beyoğlu Youth Group of the Islamist MSP Party, Erdoğan wrote, directed, and played the lead role in a play titled "Mas-Kom-Ya" (Mason-Komünist-Yahudi [Mason-Communist-Jew]), which presented freemasonry, communism, and Judaism as evil.

==== Film and television ====
In 2006, the film Valley of the Wolves: Iraq was screened in Turkey. Many critics regarded it as anti-American and antisemitic. The latter charge is based on the fact that the film has a scene where a Jewish doctor, an employee in the U.S. Army, trades bodies of prisoners of the Abu Ghraib detention centre.

Footage from the Turkish TV show Ayrılık ("Farewell") tells a story of love with Operation Cast lead in the background. The footage prompted the Israeli Foreign Ministry in October 2009 to summon the chargé d'affaires of Turkey in Israel, D. Ozen to give explanations. Discontents were made as to the scene where the actors depicting Israeli soldiers shoot Palestinian "soldiers" and kill a Palestinian girl, as well as to a number of other scenes. The officials of the Israeli Foreign Ministry stated that "the scene does not have even a remote connection to… reality and depicts the Israeli army as the murderers of innocent children."

In January 2010, after the new TV series Valley of the Wolves: Ambush was aired in Turkey, the Turkish ambassador to Israel, Oğuz Çelikol, was summoned to the Israeli Foreign Ministry for explanations. The Israel dissatisfaction was a scene where the agents of the Mossad, as performed by the Turkish actors, kidnapped Turkish children and took the Turkish ambassador and his family as hostages. The Deputy Minister for Foreign Affairs of Israel, Danny Ayalon, in a conversation with the Turkish ambassador expressed his opinion that "the scene, similar to the one shown in the series, make life of Jews in Turkey unsafe." At that meeting, Ayalon defiantly violated several rules of diplomatic etiquette, which eventually led to a diplomatic scandal. Oğuz Çelikol himself condemned the resumption of the said Turkish TV show series.

Attacks on Jews are also heard on Turkish television. Representatives of the Jewish community in Turkey in early 2009 expressed concern about the antisemitic statements that were expressed in a number of television programs.

In July 2014, Imam Mehmet Sait Yaz gave a sermon in Diyarbakır which was broadcast by OdaTV and later translated by cited by MEMRI. During the sermon, Yaz stated that "You shall find the Jews to be the most hostile toward the believers. The most rabid and savage enemies of Islam on this Earth are the Jews. Who said this? Allah did" and that "These Jews spoil all the agreements on Earth and have murdered 17 of their own prophets … And I declare here: All Jews who have taken up arms to murder Muslims must be killed, and Israel must be wiped off the map! This will be done with the help of Allah. Have no fear. These are good tidings. This is gospel...The Muslims will attack Israel and the Jews. The Jews will run and hide. When the Jew hides behind [trees and] stones, the [trees and] stones will say: 'Oh servant of Allah, there is a Jew behind you. Come and get him." AKP lawmaker Cuma İçten, who subsequently posted Yaz's speech on his Facebook page, described Yaz's words as "magnificent."

In 2015, an Erdoğan-affiliated news channel broadcast a two-hour documentary titled "The Mastermind" (a term which Erdoğan himself had introduced to the public some months earlier), which forcefully suggested that it were "the mind of the Jews" that "rules the world, burns, destroys, starves, wages wars, organizes revolutions and coups, and establishes states within states."

==== Flyers, posters and vandalism ====
Anti-Jewish incidents after January 2009:

The banners at the press conference of the anti-Israeli Federation Association of Culture Osman Gazi in Eskisehir read: "Dogs allowed, for Jews and Armenians the entrance is closed". In Istanbul the leaflets were posted calling "not to buy at Jewish stores and not serve Jews."

Some billboards in Istanbul had the following text: "You can not be the son of Moses" and "Not in your book", with quotations from the Torah condemning the killing and with pictures of bloody children's footwear. In İzmir and Istanbul, some synagogues have been desecrated by insulting and threatening graffiti. The lists with names of famous Jewish physicians were distributed with the call to kill them in retaliation for an operation in Gaza. Lists were compiled and distributed with names of Jewish companies, both local and international, to boycott. In June 2010, several Turkish shops put signs reading "We do not accept dogs and Israelis".

== Violence against Jews ==
In the late 20th to early 21st centuries in Turkey, there were three anti-Jewish terrorist attacks. In all three cases, the militants attacked the main synagogue of Istanbul, Neve Shalom Synagogue.

On 6 September 1986, a terrorist from the Palestinian organization of Abu Nidal machine gunned visitors at Neve Shalom Synagogue during Sabbath prayers. 23 Jews were killed and 6 were injured.

On 15 November 2003, suicide bombers using cars exploded near two synagogues in Istanbul in which 25 people were killed and 300 were wounded. Islamists justified their actions by stating that there were "Israeli agents working" in the synagogues. Responsibility for the attacks were claimed by Al-Qaeda and a Turkish Islamist organization, the Great Eastern Islamic Raiders' Front. For these attacks, the Turkish courts convicted 48 people linked to Al-Qaeda.

On 21 August 2003, Joseph Yahya, a 35-year-old dentist from Istanbul, was found dead in his clinic. The murderer was arrested in March 2004 and admitted that he killed Yahya out of antisemitic motives.

On 6 January 2009 a basketball match at the European Cup between Israeli FC Bnei Hasharon and Turkish Türk Telecom was interrupted by Turkish fans. The fans chanted insulting slogans and tried to throw objects at hand at Israeli athletes. Police defended the Israelis from the attack.

Also in January 2009, an attack on a Jewish soldier in the Turkish army was reported. The assailant was immediately punished by the commander of the military base. In the same period a number of Jewish students suffered a verbal abuse and physical attacks.

In June 2010, Islamists threatened Turkish Jews with violence in connection with the Turkish-Israeli conflict over the "Freedom Flotilla".

== Opposition ==
Direct antisemitic actions in Turkey are prosecuted by the government. In 2009, a store owner, who posted on its door a banner reading "Entrance for Jews and Armenians Forbidden!" was sentenced to five months in prison. However, a report of the World Jewish Congress noted that during the operation in Gaza, the Turkish justice system did not pursue antisemitic actions of participants and did not interfere with antisemitic incitement.

In October 2004, the socialist Turkish magazine Birikim published a statement entitled "No tolerance for anti-Semitism!" It was signed by 113 well-known Turkish Muslim and non-Muslim intellectuals.

A particularly hostile attitude towards Israel and Jews was reported during Israeli military operation Cast Lead, the Turkish police had to take measures to protect Jewish institutions in Turkey. Many liberal journalists in the newspaper Hürriyet, Milliyet and Vatan published weighted statements, noting that criticism of Israeli policies should not go into hostility towards the Jews. Protection of Jewish institutions in Turkey was reinforced in June 2010 after the incident with the "Freedom Flotilla". Interior Minister Beşir Atalay said that the authorities will not allow that Turkish Jews suffer from anti-Israel speeches.

Addressing criticism of Israel in connection with the operation in Gaza, Prime Minister Erdoğan said at the same time that "anti-Semitism is a crime against humanity". On 27 January 2010 at the International Holocaust Remembrance Day, Turkish Foreign Ministry announced that Turkey would continue its policy aimed against antisemitism, racism, xenophobia and discrimination.

In May 2021, the Biden administration condemned as "antisemitic" and "reprehensible" comments made by President Erdoğan regarding the Jewish people. On 20 May 2021, the Jewish community in Turkey showed support to Turkish president Recep Tayyip Erdoğan and condemned the US calling Turkey an ''antisemitic country''.

== Public opinion ==
In a 2008 survey by the Pew Research Center, 76% of Turks had an unfavourable view of Jews and 7% had a positive view on Jews.

Turkish Jews are concerned about antisemitic sentiments in Turkey, for example, some private shops posted tablets with the inscription "Jews are not allowed". A similar concern is also raised by American Jewish organizations.

IDC Professor Barry Rubin believes that an open advocacy of antisemitism in Turkey "is far superior to anything that happens in Europe."

After the raid of Israel on "Freedom Flotilla" off the coast of Gaza, on 31 May 2010, which resulted in the death of 9 Turkish citizens, the Turkish Prime Minister Erdoğan said that "Israel must put an end to speculation on Semitism around the world", and Islamist demonstrators on the anti-Israeli rallies have used antisemitic slogans, including phrase "Death to the Jews".

Rıfat Bali, believes that any attempt to resist the growth of antisemitic sentiments would lead to the deterioration of the situation, Turkish Jews must either leave, or be prepared to live in a massive antisemitic environment.

== See also ==
- Antisemitism in Islam
- Conspiracy theories in Turkey
- Freedom of religion in Turkey
- History of the Jews in the Ottoman Empire
- History of the Jews in Turkey
- History of the Jews under Muslim rule
- Islamic–Jewish relations
- Islam in the Ottoman Empire
- Israel–Turkey relations
- Racism in Muslim communities
- Religion in Turkey
- Xenophobia and discrimination in Turkey
- Xenophobia and racism in the Middle East
