= Ali Jakupi =

Albanian Islamic Scholar

- Title: Efendi; Hoca; Imam

Personal life
- Born: 1913 Gjilan, Vilayet of Kosovo, Ottoman Empire
- Died: 1988 (aged 74–75) Istanbul, Turkey
- Home town: Gjilan
- Citizenship: Turkish
- Main interest(s): Shariah (Islamic law), Aqidah (Islamic Belief), Tafsir (Quran exegesis), Kalam (Islamic theology), Islamic education, Arabic literature, Ottoman literature
- Education: Al-Azhar University
- Occupation: Imam, Alim, professor, Author

Religious life
- Religion: Islam
- Denomination: Sunni
- Jurisprudence: Hanafi
- Creed: Maturidi

Muslim leader
- Influenced by: Mustafa Sabri Efendi al-Kawthari Hassan al-Banna Yozgatlı İhsan Efendi Ataullah Efendi Sejfedin Efendi Shakir Mesihović Hasan Faik Efendi Myderris Abdurrahman Efendi Molla Kadri Efendi Hafiz Hyseni Haxhi Jakupi
- Influenced: Diyanet imams

Ali efendi Jakupi (1913–1988) was an Albanian Islamic scholar, imam, alim, and professor. He was known for his role in the education of Diyanet imams during the 1970s and 1980s.

== Early life and education ==
Ali efendi Jakupi was born in the town of Gjilan, in the Vilayet of Kosovo. His father was Hafiz Hyseni and his mother was Hyrishah. His family lineage traced back to Omer Bej, an ancestor in the eighth generation who had emigrated from the village of Kolgec in Shkodër and settled in Desivojca, Gjilan. The family was locally known as Shkodraliu. His grandfather, Haxhi Jakupi, was educated at the medrese in Niš, while his father, Hafiz Hyseni, graduated from the Fatih Medrese in Istanbul.

He completed his primary education at the Serbian-language elementary school in Gjilan, while simultaneously receiving religious instruction from his father in Qur'an, Islamic sciences, and general subjects. Between 1924 and 1927, he studied at the Gjilan medrese, receiving additional instruction from Molla Kadri Efendi and Myderris Abdurrahman Efendi. He also studied privately with Hasan Faik Efendi, who taught him general Islamic subjects and the French language.

In 1927, Jakupi moved to Skopje and enrolled in the "Meddah" medrese, studying under the well-known teacher Ataullah Efendi. He also received instruction in rhetoric (balagha) and Ottoman Turkish literature from Sejfedin Efendi. He returned to Gjilan and, between 1928 and 1929, attended the local state secondary school.

In 1931, upon the recommendation of Shakir Mesihović, a member of the Sarajevo Ulema Meclisi (Council of Scholars), he was admitted to the "Mektebi Nuvvab" (Medrese of the Qadis) in Sarajevo, where he studied for three years. Following his father's death in 1932, he temporarily paused his studies. In 1936, he traveled to Egypt and enrolled in the Faculty of Usul al-Din at Al-Azhar University, where he completed his studies. During this period, he became acquainted with several prominent Ottoman-era scholars residing in Egypt, including Mustafa Sabri Efendi, Zahid al-Kawthari, and Yozgatlı İhsan Efendi.

== Career ==
Between 1946 and 1957, Ali efendi Jakupi worked as an employee at the central library of Cairo University. From July 1957 to November 1959, he was employed as a translator at the Egyptian embassy in Ankara. In 1960, benefiting from his diplomatic employment, he acquired Turkish citizenship and settled in Istanbul, where he later established a family.

Following his relocation, he worked as an economist in the private sector at a factory. Concurrently, he taught at several mosques in Istanbul, including Fatih Mosque, Mesih Pasha, and Emir Buhari mosques. His lessons included readings from classical Islamic texts such as Ihya Ulum al-Din, Adab al-Dunya wa al-Din, Madarik al-Tanzil, and Diwan al-Mutanabbi.

From 1976 to 1980, Jakupi taught exegesis (tafsir), theology (kalam), and rhetoric (balagha) at the Diyanet's "Haseki" educational center. He also held private study circles at his home, where he provided instruction to students from both secondary schools and higher education institutions.

== Works ==
In 1967, together with Osman Öztürk, Ali efendi Jakupi translated and published Jahiliyat al-Qarn al-Ishrin (The Ignorance of the Twentieth Century) by Muhammad Qutb.

During his time in Cairo, he translated into Arabic the first poem of Safahat titled Fatih Mosque, which was published in the literary journal Majallat al-Adab. He also translated into prose a poem describing the Battle of Çanakkale from the sixth chapter of Safahat, written by his compatriot Mehmet Akif Ersoy. His friend, the poet Savi Sha‘lan, later rendered this translation into verse under the title Qasidat al-Shuhada (Poem of the Martyrs).

== Death ==
In 1983, Ali efendi Jakupi suffered a stroke. He died on 22 May 1988 and was buried at Sakızağacı Cemetery in Edirnekapı, Istanbul.

== See also ==
- Al-Azhar University
- Mustafa Sabri
- al-Kawthari
- Islam in Albania
- Islam in Kosovo
- Albanian Sunni Muslims
- Diyanet
- Hanafi school
- Ottoman Empire
- Gjilan
