= Cevat Rıfat Atilhan =

Turkish officer and writer (1892–1967)

Mehmet Cevat Rıfat Atilhan
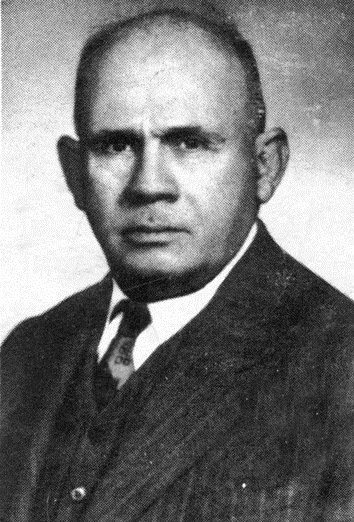

Personal details
- Born: 1892 Constantinople, Ottoman Empire
- Died: 4 February 1967 (aged 74/75) Istanbul, Turkey

Mehmet Cevat Rıfat Atilhan (1892 – 4 February 1967) was a Turkish career officer and antisemitic writer. Known as one of the most prominent Nazi sympathizers in Turkey, he was an initiator of the 1934 Thrace pogroms.

== Biography ==
He was born in 1892 in Vefa, Istanbul. His father Rifat Pasha was the Ottoman Governor of Damascus. His grandfather was Hurşit Paşa, who was a British-born Hungarian revolutionary that sought refuge in the Ottoman Empire either after 1831 or after the Hungarian Revolution of 1848, and served as an Ottoman official principally in Bosnia Vilayet. The first years of his childhood passed in Damascus. Then he came to Constantinople and went to Fatih İptidaisi (primary school). After graduating from primary school, he started to Kuleli Military High School, preferring to military service. In his first days in the lieutenant years he took part in the Albanian campaign. He was taken prisoner by the Bulgarians in the siege of Edirne. Bondage lasted two years.

At the beginning of World War I, he was ordered by Ahmed Cemal Pasha to be posted in the Middle Eastern front. He came forward with his heroism in the Sinai and Palestinian fronts.

Upon the conclusion of the First World War, Mehmed Cemal Pasha of Mersin came to Konya. The establishment of the National Front had great benefits. He met with Sultan Mehmed VI as the first national representative. When Sultan Mehmed VI left his post, Damat Ferid Pasha had Atilhan arrested because of a conspiracy. He was imprisoned in the Bekir Ağa Bölgesi.

During the Turkish War of Independence, he was appointed as the commander of the fronts of Zonguldak-Bartın and its vicinity by Mustafa Kemal Pasha. It prevented the spread of the French Army in this region. Upon the victory of the War of Independence, he left the army and went into writing.

After in the late 1920s, Atilhan started publishing antisemitic books. After publishing Suzy Liberman, Jewish Spy in 1935, the Turkish Army gave the order to buy 40,000 copies and distributed them amongst the officers. The book was banned on September 17, 1936.

In 1940, Atilhan was arrested on suspicion of preparing a pro-Nazi coup. He was incarcerated for 11 months before being released by the results of an investigation led by Fevzi Çakmak. During the 1948 Palestine war, Atilhan organized the Turkish Legion, a volunteer unit composed of 300 retired Turkish soldiers, to fight against Israel. According to Atilhan, the Turkish volunteers managed to capture a village and later joined the Jordanian Army.

During the one-party period of Turkey, Atilhan who was close to the ideas of Turkism, contributed writings to two of the most influential magazines of Islamist ideology in early Turkey: Sebilürreşad and Büyük Doğu. His writings and his political activities affected growing Islamist movements in Turkey. He was one of the founders of the National Development Party in 1945 and the Democratic Party of Islam in 1951. He was arrested in 1952 along with Necip Fazıl Kısakürek in Malatya as responsible for the assassination attempt of Ahmet Emin Yalman. He was detained for 11 months and 15 days.

He wrote 74 works and thousands of articles. He was influenced by antisemitic politicians like Şerif Yaçağaz and Ali Galip Yenen. Because of his antisemitic writings, he was described as the 'Hitler of Turkey'.

In August 1964 he was invited to the Congress of the Islamic States in Somalia. He was elected as the chairman of the executive committee of the Congress. This post was his last major mission.

He died of a heart attack in Istanbul on 4 February 1967.
