= Sebilürreşad =

Defunct Islamist magazine in Turkey (1908–1925)

Headline of the Sırât-ı Müstakîm

Sebîlürreşâd (Turkish: Straight Path) was a Turkish print magazine founded by Mehmet Akif Ersoy and Eşref Edip Fergan along with Ebül'ula Mardin as its lead writer in August 1908, to promote Islamism. It originally started under the name Sırat-ı Müstakim.

== History ==
The magazine was launched with the title Sırat-ı Müstakim in 1908. It was a weekly Islamic magazine edited by Mehmet Akif, in which the Islamic thought established itself and the theses of the Islamist movement. After the 183rd issue published in 1912, it was renamed as Sebîlürreşâd. Between 1908-1925, 641 issues were published. The magazine was the most important publication of the Islamist movement during the Second Constitution period (1908–1918). It published nearly all sections of Safahat written by Mehmet Akif. The magazine, which was closed in 1925 with the Takrir-i Sükûn (Law on the Maintenance Order in English), was restarted in May 1948 with the Turkish alphabet. It folded in 1966.

Ebül‘ulâ Mardin, its manager, left the magazine when he became a deputy and then a professor, and the technical load and responsibility of the journal remained entirely of Eşref Edip. Due to the misunderstanding of a section in Ispartalı Hakkı's article titled "Akif and Safahat" on 11 May 1911, it was decided to be closed indefinitely by the customary administration, but once the situation was understood, it continued its publication without delay.

The magazine, which initially remained neutral against political parties, changed this attitude after 1911. It was one of the publications which supported the Independence movement led by Mustafa Kemal. The magazine, which paid attention to maintain a publishing policy that is highly compatible with the state mechanism and not to be an element of sedition in the gentle environment of the war years, changed its attitude after the abolition of the caliphate, the closure of madrasas within the framework of the Tevhîd-i Tedrîsat Law, and the abolition of the Ministry of Foundations. Under normal conditions, the magazine, which was published once a week and sixteen pages per week, did not use image materials such as photographs and pictures, except six issues.

The magazine, published in Istanbul, was distributed to many regions of Anatolia. It was able to determine the agenda of Muslims in Russia, India and Middle East.

Among the authors of the weekly magazine were Abdülaziz Çaviş, Bereketzade İsmail Hakkı, Babanzade Ahmet Naim, Ferit Kam, Mehmet Fahrettin, İsmail Hakkı of İzmir, Tâhirü'l-Mevlevî, Aksekili Ahmet Hamdi, Mehmet Şemsettin Günaltay, İsmail Hakkı of Manastir, Mehmet Tahir of Bursa, Yusuf Akçura and Ahmet Ağaoğlu.

The general policy of the magazine was about Islamic unity, Islamic morality, return to the Qur'an and Sunnah, and the acquisition of only Europe's technology. In March 1951 leftist university students organized demonstrations protesting both Sebilürreşad and Büyük Doğu due to their religious approach and were arrested by the Turkish forces.

== Spin offs ==
After 50 years, Sebîlürreşad started publishing by Fatih Bayhan in Ankara again on 14 August 2016.

The magazine was published on the fourteenth day of each month until February 2017. As of March 2017, it started to appear on the 1st of each month and increased the number of pages to 56. In addition, six to eight articles in languages other than Turkish are included in each issue in the new period of Sebîlürreşad. In the January 2017 issue of Sebîlürreşad, the article of the 12th President, Recep Tayyip Erdoğan, appeared for the first time.
