= 1934 Thrace pogroms =

Pogroms against Jews in Turkey

- Location: Eastern Thrace, Turkey; including Tekirdağ, Edirne, Kırklareli, and Çanakkale
- Date: June–July 1934
- Target: Property of the Jewish population of the city
- Deaths: 1
- Perpetrator: Turkish mobs

The 1934 Thrace pogroms (Turkish: Trakya Olayları, "Thrace incidents" or "Thrace events", Ladino: Furtuna/La Furtuna, "Storm") were a series of violent attacks against Jewish citizens of Turkey in June and July 1934 in the Thrace region of Turkey. One of the main crucial factors behind the events was the Resettlement Law passed by the Turkish Assembly on 14 June 1934.

== Background ==
Some have argued that the acts were initiated by the articles written by Pan-Turkist ideologists like Cevat Rıfat Atilhan and Faik Kurdoğlu in Millî İnkılâp (National Revolution) magazine and Nihal Atsız in Orhun magazine. One researcher accepted Atilhan's role, but he argued that Atsız did not participate in such an act, because Orhun only contained two articles about Jews, and both of them were published after Atsız resettled in İstanbul. Then the Resettlement Law was meant to enable demographic engineering in favor of a potentially Turkish speaking majority and the campaign Citizens speak Turkish!, which meant to force the people to speak Turkish, was supported by the Turkish Halkevleri. On the 5 July after having become aware of the potential repercussions, the chairman of the Halkevleri in Izmir denied the campaign was directed at Jews and claimed it was only against foreign languages, including Greek, Spanish and Albanian.

== Pogrom ==
The incidents that preceded the pogrom started in Çanakkale in the second half of June 1934. The pogroms occurred in Tekirdağ, Edirne, Kırklareli, and Çanakkale, and they were motivated by antisemitism.

The government of Mustafa Kemal Atatürk acted strongly against rioters and officials who failed to prevent the pogrom. After the foreign press reported about the pogroms, Prime Minister İsmet İnönü acknowledged their existence, condemned them and blamed them on antisemitism.

In the context of the 1934 Turkish Resettlement Law, foreign diplomats who were then based in Turkey believed that the Turkish government implicitly supported the Thrace pogrom to facilitate the relocation of Turkey's Jewish population. Haaretz reports that according to the historian Corry Guttstadt, "the Turkish authorities had apparently opted for the strategy of putting the Jews under such pressure with boycott activities and anonymous threats 'from the population' that they would leave the area 'voluntarily.'"

However, others disagree. Although the Law on Settlement may well have actually provoked the outbreak of the incidents, the national authorities did not side with the attackers but immediately intervened in the incidents. After order was restored, the governors and mayors of the provinces involved were removed from office. Further, according to historian Rifat Bali, incitement of violence against Jews was then common in the press and contributed to the violence.

== Aftermath ==
The government of Mustafa Kemal Atatürk acted strongly against rioters and officials who failed to prevent the pogrom. After the foreign press reported about the pogroms, Prime Minister İsmet İnönü acknowledged their existence, condemned them and blamed them on antisemitism. Up to 15,000 Jewish citizens of Turkey fled from the region and settled in Istanbul.

== See also ==
- Razgrad Incident
- Antisemitism in Turkey
- Racism in Turkey
