= Büyük Doğu (magazine) =

Political magazine in Turkey (1945–1978)

- Categories: Political magazine
- Frequency: Weekly
- Founder: Necip Fazıl Kısakürek
- Founded: 1945
- First issue: 2 November 1945
- Final issue: 1978
- Country: Turkey
- Based in: Istanbul
- Language: Turkish

Büyük Doğu (Turkish: The Great East) was one of the early Islamist political publications in Turkey. It was started as a daily newspaper and later relaunched as a weekly magazine. Büyük Doğu was "one of two outlets of the Cold War Islamic thought in Turkey." The publication was a platform for its founder, Necip Fazıl Kısakürek, to disseminate his arguments and views. It was in circulation between 1943 and 1978 with some intervals and produced a total of 512 issues. Büyük Doğu was closed down by the authorities thirteen times during its thirty-five-year run.

== History and profile ==
=== Newspaper edition ===
Büyük Doğu was first published as a daily newspaper on 17 September 1943 with the aim of being a newspaper for Muslim Turkish people who were committed to God and a new worldview. Therefore, it aimed at teaching people about their faith.

Its founder was a significant right-wing and conservative figure, Necip Fazıl Kısakürek. The contributors of Büyük Doğu included many leading journalists and writers: Ziya Şakir, Mahmut Yesari, Reşat Ekrem Koçu, Nurullah Berk, Hilmi Ziya Ülken, Mehmet Faruk Gürtunca, Suphi Nuri İleri, Hüseyin Cahit Yalçın, Nizamettin Nazif, Nejat Muhsinoğlu, Peyami Safa, Şükrü Baban, Burhan Belge, Kazım Nami, Salih Zeki, Tevfik Fikret, Özdemir Asaf, İskender Fikret, Kenan Harun, Salah Birsel, Mehmet Turhan and Sait Faik. Islamist journalist Cevat Rıfat Atilhan also wrote for the magazine in addition to Sebilürreşad, another conservative magazine. Although such a wide variety of writers published articles in Büyük Doğu, most of the articles were written by Necip Fazıl Kısakürek who employed numerous pseudonyms.

The paper was one of the fierce critics of secularism in Turkey. On 2 November 1943 Büyük Doğu newspaper was banned due to the articles which were written by Necip Fazıl Kısakürek under different pseudonyms.

=== Magazine edition ===
In 1945 Büyük Doğu was restarted as a weekly magazine. It was very popular among the conservative readers. The magazine continued its opposition against the ruling party, Republican People's Party, and was critical of the employment of women. One year after its start Necip Fazıl published his commentary about The Protocols of the Elders of Zion which contained a clear anti-Semitic tone. A Turkish translation of The International Jew was published in Büyük Doğu in 1949. One of its contributors was Süleyman Yalçın, a conservative thinker and physician, who published articles in the magazine from 1956 to 1959 and in 1972.

When the Democrat Party won the elections and formed the government in 1950, the magazine did not support the party due to its moderate approach. However, Büyük Doğu became one of the pro-DP publications over time. In the 1950s the main target of Necip Fazıl's articles in Büyük Doğu was Ahmet Emin Yalman, a journalist. He accused Yalman of being a Dönmeh and traitor.

In March 1951 leftist university students organized demonstrations protesting both Büyük Doğu and Sebilürreşad due to their religious approach and were arrested by the Turkish forces. The criticisms of Büyük Doğu against reforms carried out by Mustafa Kemal Atatürk in March 1959 also led to violent protests by university professors, students and journalists.

In addition to political content Büyük Doğu featured several examples of the symbolist poems which were formalized in a former literary magazine Dergâh. Büyük Doğu was banned and ceased publication on 5 June 1978 after publishing 512 issues. During its lifetime it was shut down at least thirteen times.
