= Aliyah and Yishuv during World War I =

Prior to and during World War I, the area of Palestine was controlled by the Ottoman Empire. The Ottoman regime, since late 19th century, imposed many harsh demands on the Yishuv, and was ended in 1918 when Britain occupied the territory, followed by the establishment of the British Mandate in 1922.

== History ==
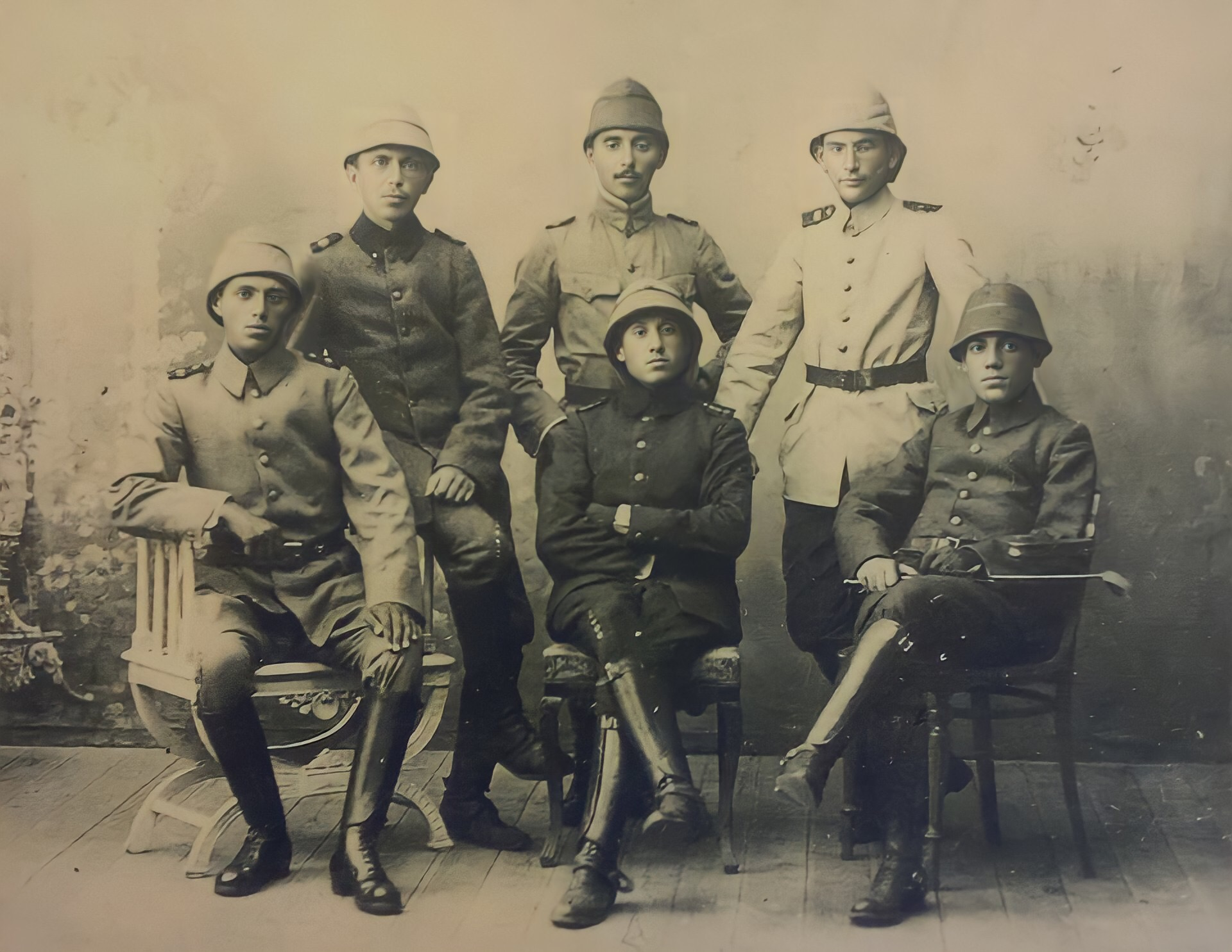
Jewish officers from Palestine serving in the Ottoman Army, pictured in Istanbul in 1916. Standing: Dov Hoz, Moshe Sharett, Shemuel Yeivin. Seated: David Beit Halachmi, Avshalom Gissin, and Moshe Gvirtzman

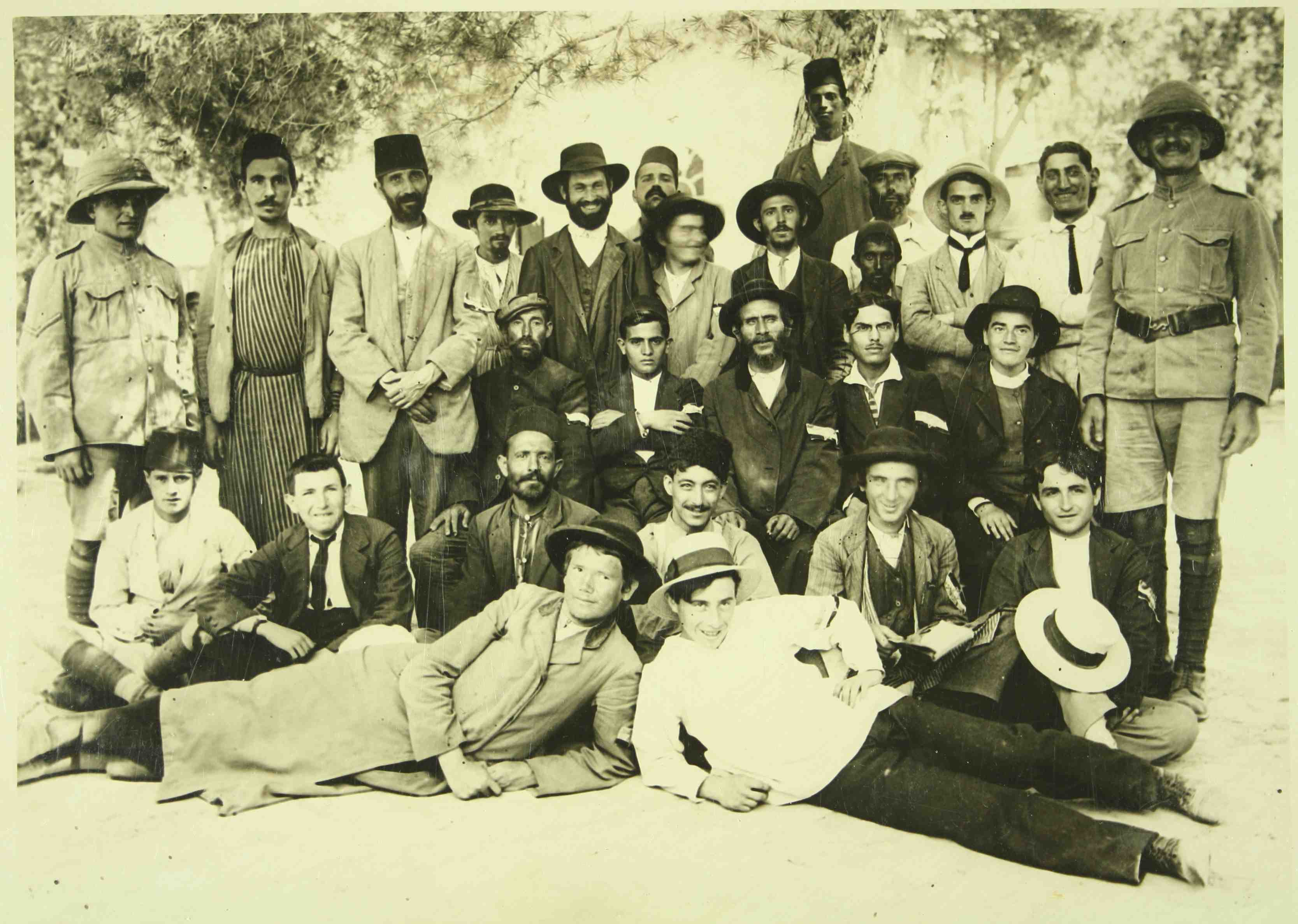
Jewish volunteers from Palestine enlisting in the British Army, 1918.

Upon the eruption of World War I, the regime severed supply lines to Palestine and caused a severe food shortage. This severing of supply lines also caused economic difficulty and prevented the arrival of donations. On top of these problems, the regime piled up additional difficulties such as war taxes and the confiscation of work animals, tools and food. Other difficulties (either unrelated or not in direct relation to the regime) arose in the form of a locust attack (which the settlers were not equipped to deal with), famine and poverty (the result of donations ceasing), epidemics such as typhus, bank closures and inflation.

The attitude of the Ottoman administration toward the Jews hardened as their situation in the war deteriorated and it made the functioning of the Yishuv much harder. This situation lasted almost four years. First the Ottoman authorities canceled the regime of capitulation (immunity to foreign citizens) and as a result those that arrived from Allied countries (including the majority of the immigrants who originated from Russia) were now considered enemies. There started a sort of a war between the Ottoman authorities and the Zionist movement in Palestine. The Ottoman authorities violated the freedom rights of the Jewish population. The Jewish population was not permitted to carry any weapons, to hold any stamps of the Jewish National Fund and to write letters in Yiddish or Hebrew. It became mandatory to learn Turkish in the schools of the Jewish population and the Zionist flag was banned. In 1915, the Ottomans demanded that non-citizens, including Jews, take Ottoman citizenship or leave the country. The peak of the friction was when the authorities demanded that some of the Jews elist in the Ottoman Army or leave the country.

The Ottoman authorities even made a number of deportations from the country. In 1917 the authorities deported the Jews of Tel Aviv and Jaffa by ship to Egypt as a result of the progress of the British front in the south of the country. (The Ottomans feared that the Jewish population in Tel Aviv would assist the British in taking control over the country.) The Ottoman authorities also deported the leaders of the Jewish population in the Land of Israel—David Ben-Gurion and Yitzhak Ben-Zvi were deported from the empire in spite of the Zionist leadership officially declaring their support to the Ottoman Empire.

The relation of the authorities evoke divisions of many opinions among Yishuv leadership. Ben-Gurion, leader of the labor party Poale Zion, said that enlistment into the Ottoman Army might lead to the sympathy from the Turks. Numerous Jews from Palestine served in the Ottoman Army during the war. While some served as officers, Jewish soldiers were largely sent to labor battalions that provided logistical support for the army, often working in difficult and degrading conditions. At the end of the war, the Yishuv was at its lowest ebb. Its number fell from 84,000 to 56,000 and it suffered considerable economic difficulties.

== Coping with the problems ==
Jewish Americans in the United States and even the American government began fundraising and accumulating food which they shipped by boat in order to help the Jewish population in the Land of Israel. They confronted two major problems. First, they needed an agreement from the president of the United States in sending the aid—this was the first time in which the American government operated a pro-Zionist policy. Second, they needed to receive agreement from the Ottomans that the food and the money would be passed on to the Jewish population. The Ottoman authority agreed to this eventually, in exchange for about 45% of the aid shipment.

The United States and Germany (which was a partner of Turkey during the war) pressured Turkey against the deportation of the Jewish population from the country.

Three possibilities came upon the Jewish settlers:

- Becoming a Turkish national with all the responsibilities that come with it (mainly enlistment to the army and paying the taxes).
- Collaboration with the British—officially (Jewish Legion) and underground (Nili).
- Fleeing—mainly to Egypt, which was the closest, in order to return easily after the crisis.

The position of the World Zionist Organization was divided. The majority of the Zionist leaders supported and identified with Germany—it would be able to release Russian Jews from the burden of the czar, and Turkey which was a partner of Germany during the war would hopefully change its mind about the Jewish population in Israel. In contrast with that, supporting the Allies of World War I might give a reason for the Ottomans to eliminate the Jewish settlement in the Land of Israel. Still, identification with Germany during the war might have endangered the millions of Jews in Russia and Poland, and as the Allies of World War I would not agree to the national demands of the Jews. Due to these considerations eventually it was decided on a more neutral policy. This position required the moving of the central offices of the World Zionist Organization out of Berlin, but because this might have been seen by Germany as a betrayal, the offices remained in Berlin, though new offices were built in Denmark, which was a neutral country during the war.

Chaim Weizmann and Ze'ev Jabotinsky supported political activism rather than neutralism. They believed that the Ottoman Empire was weakening and Britain would occupy the Land of Israel and therefore they invested their efforts in finding ways of collaboration with Britain. France, unlike Britain, supported the Christians of Lebanon and not the Jews. Ze'ev Jabotinsky offered to establish Jewish fighting units that would be a part of the British Army. In return they recognized the moral right of the Jews to live in Israel. In contrast to Jabotinsky, Weizmann requested a political declaration on the rights of the Jewish population in Israel, in the assertion that British have a strategic interest to help to Jewish population, in order to have a hold of that area. He tried to arouse a humane emotion among the British to the suffering Jews. Weitzman tried to convince that it was in the good of Britain to help the Jews, in contrast with Jabotinsky who tried to use cold facts to convince the British. Eventually Weitzman's method worked with the Balfour Declaration, whereas the method of Jabotinsky only worked partially. with the establishment of the Zion Mule Corps and subsequently the Jewish Legion. The British Army formed the Zion Mule Corps in 1915 from Jews who had been exiled from Palestine to Egypt by the Ottomans, and was responsible for transporting supplies to the front line during the Gallipoli campaign. It was subsequently disbanded and the Jewish Legion was then formed. Most of the Jewish Legion's members were Jews from the United States, United Kingdom, and Canada. Some members of the former Zion Mule Corps also joined it. The Legion participated in the Sinai and Palestine campaign. After British forces entered Palestine, a battalion for Yishuv Jews was formed. It did not participate in combat but instead carried out support roles and guarded prisoners.

A coalition of dozens of activists inside of the land of Israel decided to go against the decision of the World Zionist Organization on being neutral and they established the underground Nili espionage network to spy for the British against the Ottomans. The leaders of Nili were Aaron and Sarah Aaronsohn, Avshalom Feinberg and Yosef Lishansky. The underground acted within the land of Israel and in Syria between 1915 and 1917. The interconnection between the Nili and the British intelligence took place during visits British ships in Atlit, through messengers in Egypt, and pigeon post (when they needed to send announcements fast). Nili was exposed in 1917, and the Turkish authorities started a retaliation against the underground network and against the whole Yishuv.

== See also ==
- Antisemitism in Turkey
- Tel Aviv and Jaffa deportation
