= 1917 Jaffa deportation =

Expulsion of 10,000 Jewish and Arab residents from Jaffa and Tel Aviv in 1917

Tel Aviv and Jaffa deportation
- Date: April 6, 1917; 109 years ago
- Location: Jaffa, Tel Aviv, Ottoman Palestine
- Type: Deportation
- Cause: Ottoman suspicion of Jewish collaboration with the British
- Perpetrator: Ottoman Empire
- Deaths: 1,500
- Displaced: 10,000 (including 8,000 Jews)

Tel Aviv and Jaffa deportation was the expulsion on April 6, 1917, of 10,000 people (mostly Jewish) from Jaffa and Tel Aviv by the authorities of the Ottoman Empire in Palestine. The evicted civilians were not allowed to carry off their belongings, and the deportation was accompanied by severe violence, starvation, theft, persecution and abuse. It is thought that about 1,500 of the evicted people died as a result of the deportation. Shortly after the deportation, the Muslims affected were able to return to their homes, but the Jewish population was not able to return until the summer of 1918.

== Prior events ==
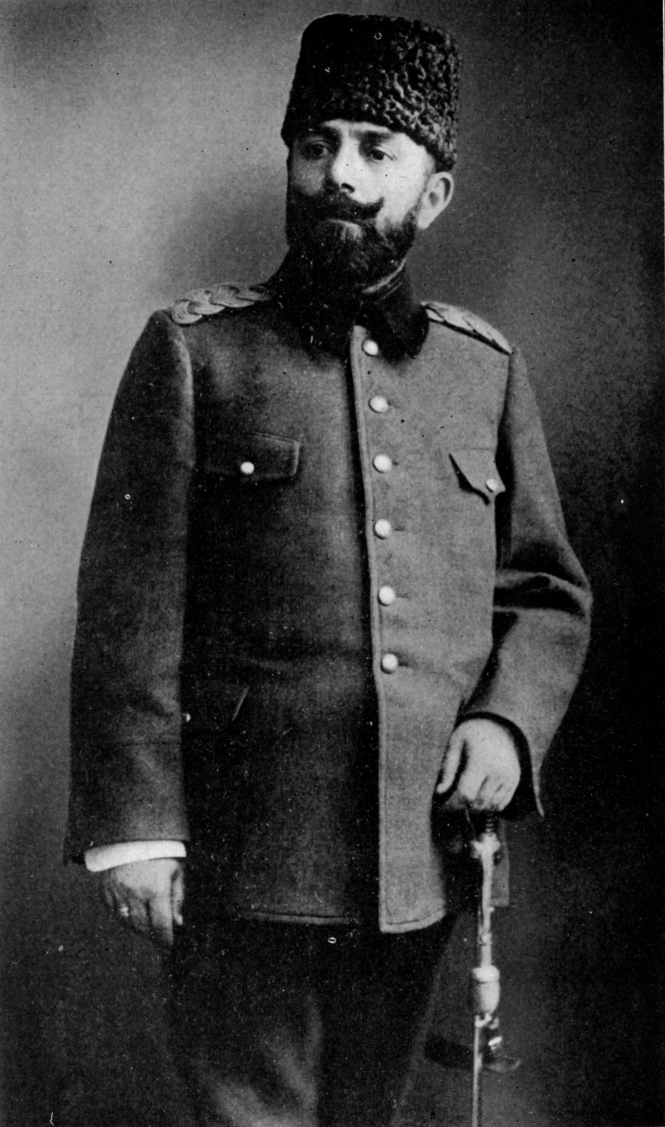
Djemal Pasha ordered the expulsion

In November 1914, the Ottoman Empire entered World War I on the side of the Central Powers. Many people who were citizens of opposing Allied countries lived in Palestine, and its Turkish officials considered them a threat to military security.

Shortly after entering the war, the Ottomans abolished the Capitulations which allowed foreigners to live within the empire without taking citizenship. The Ottoman governor made public statements against various foreign citizens throughout the empire considered to be potential spies. In December they expelled up to 6,000 Russian citizens who resided in Jaffa (all were Jewish). They were resettled in Alexandria, Egypt. The Ottoman Empire issued forcible draft of its population into the army, demanding non-citizens (including Jews) to either take Ottoman citizenship before 15 May 1915 or be expelled from the region. Following the devastating effect of the Lebanese famine, the situation worsened.

Aaron Aaronsohn described the situation,

"Meanwhile, people are literally starving. Horrified sights have seen our eyes: old women and children wandering, hunger and nightmare-madness in their dying eyes, no food falling under them and dying."

An unnamed eyewitness stated,

"Even wealthy people in Jerusalem are becoming recipients (of alms) and even courting the remaining."

== The evacuations ==
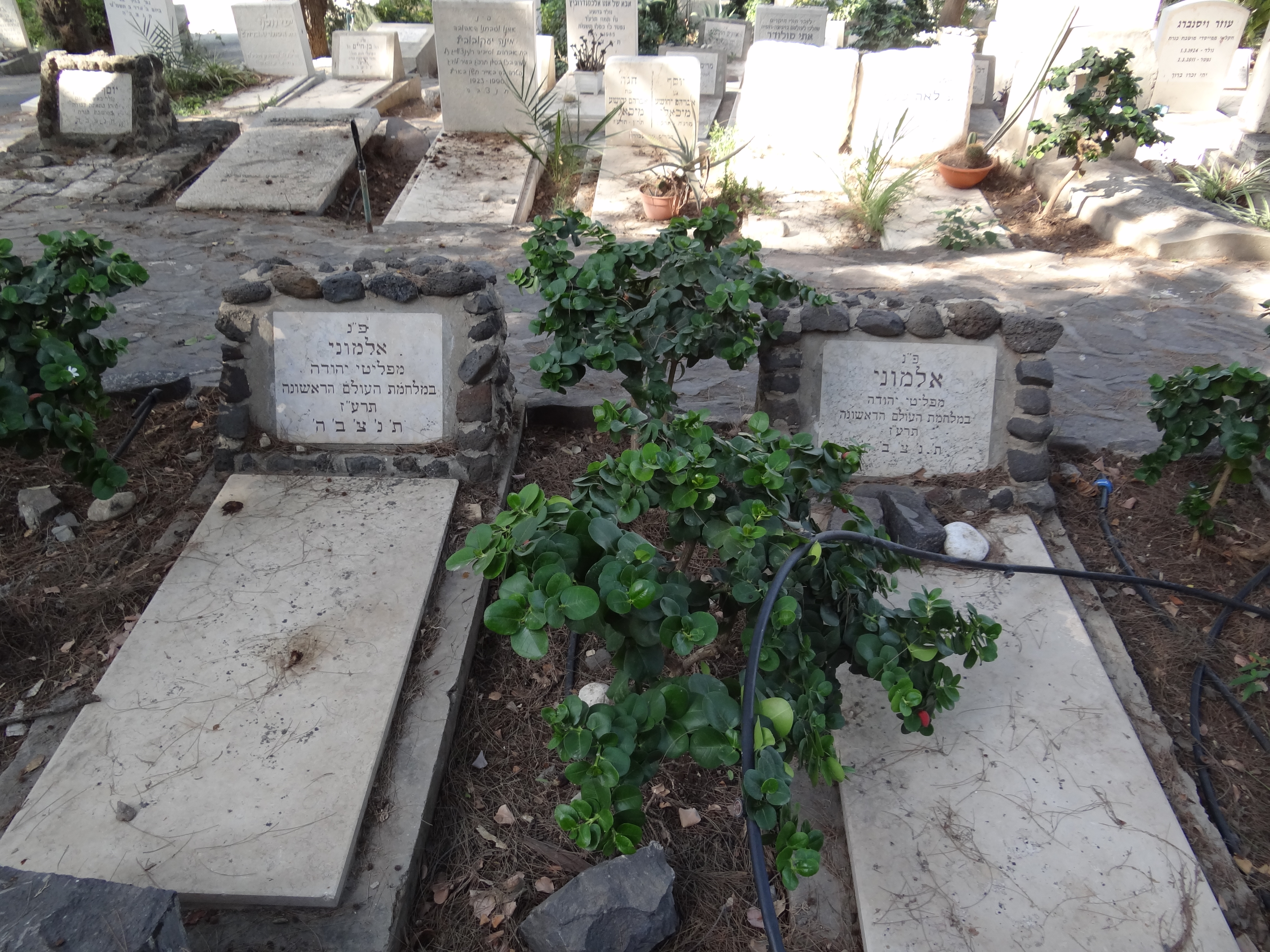
Graves of unknown victims of the Tel Aviv and Jaffa deportation

By January 1917, British forces had crossed the Sinai Desert and were about to invade Palestine, which alarmed the Turkish authorities. The Ottoman Empire began to become skeptical of the residents in the region, mostly Jews, as the Ottomans disdained them for alleged collaboration with the British following the discovery of the Nili spy ring.

At the start of March, all the inhabitants of Gaza were expelled, a town of 35,000–40,000 people, mostly Arabs. They had 48 hours to leave "even if crawling on their knees". Many of the men were conscripted and the rest scattered around Palestine and Syria, first to nearby villages and then further afield as those villages were also evacuated. Death from exposure or starvation was widespread. Gaza did not recover its pre-war population until the 1940s.

On 28 March 1917, Djemal Pasha ordered the evacuation of the inhabitants of Jaffa. They could go wherever they liked except Jerusalem or Haifa. Farmers with crops in their fields, the workers of the winery in Rishon LeZion, and the teachers and students of the Mikveh Israel school and the Latrun estate were excluded. Djemal Pasha, who was in charge of the Greater Syrian Theatre of the war, was forced to provide explanations.

Isaiah Friedman holds that the treatment of Jews was worse than for non-Jews, because Djemal Pasha was against the Zionist project in Palestine. Sheffy regards that it is more reflective of cultural and behavioral differences: the Arabs had no central organization, and with their experience of how government decrees were enforced, just remained nearby until the storm had passed, whereas the Jews obeyed the evacuation decree as a group. In any case, when New Zealand troops entered Jaffa in November 1917, only an estimated 8,000 of the previous population of 40,000 was present.

== Jewish population ==
=== Response ===
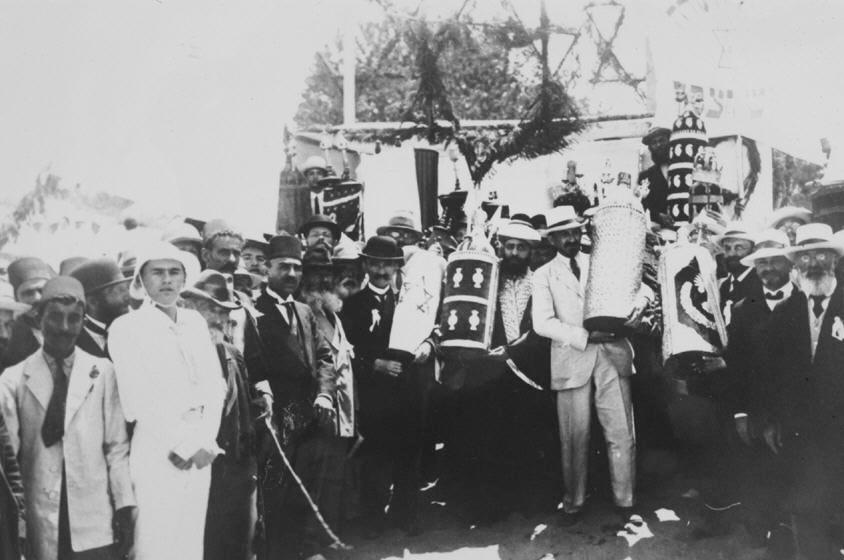
The procession to return the exiled Torah scrolls back to Tel Aviv and Jaffa in 1918.

The Jews of Jaffa and Tel Aviv organized a migration committee, headed by Meir Dizengoff and Rabbi Menachem Itzhak Kelioner. The committee arranged the transportation of the Jewish deportees to safety, with the assistance of Jews from the Galilee, who arrived in Tel Aviv with carts. The exiles were driven to Jerusalem, to cities in central Palestine (such as Petah Tikva and Kfar Saba) and to the north of Palestine, where they were scattered among the different Jewish settlements in the Lower Galilee, in Zichron Yaacov, Tiberias, and Safed. Up to 16,000 deportees were evacuated from Tel Aviv, which was left with almost no residents.

The homes and property of the Jews of Jaffa and Tel Aviv were kept in the possession of the Ottoman authorities, and they were guarded by a handful of Jewish guards. Djemal Pasha also released two Jewish doctors to join the deportees. Nonetheless, many deportees had perished during the harsh winter of 1917–1918 from hunger and contagious diseases due to negligence by the Ottoman authorities: 224 deportees are buried in Kfar Saba, 15 in Haifa, 321 in Tiberias, 104 in Safed, and 75 in Damascus.

=== Destination ===
Many Jewish deportees ended up in Zichron Yaacov, Hadera, Petah Tikva and Kfar Saba, with few choosing to go to Jerusalem despite being forbidden by the Ottoman authorities. Sympathizing with the situation, some members of the population decided to provide needed medical and financial support. But when winter 1917–1918 arrived, the situation worsened for many deportees and many died by hunger, famine, starvation and maltreatment, as several Yishuvs didn't receive them and thought they could be Ottoman spies. Deterioration of condition had prompted many Jews to flee and several of them had migrated to Egypt, or Europe and the United States.

=== Aftermath and memorials ===
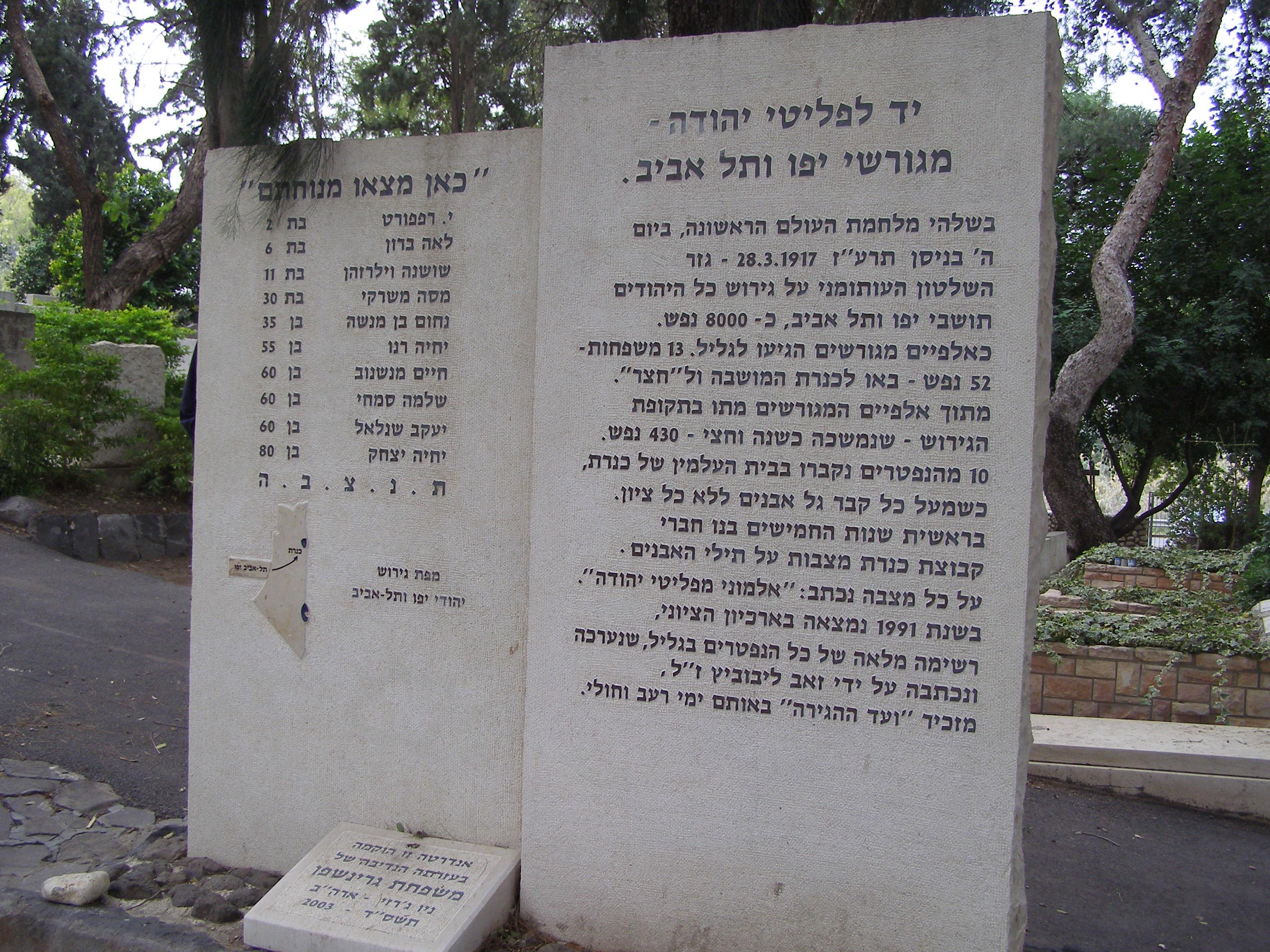
Gravestones of the deportees in Kinneret cemetery.

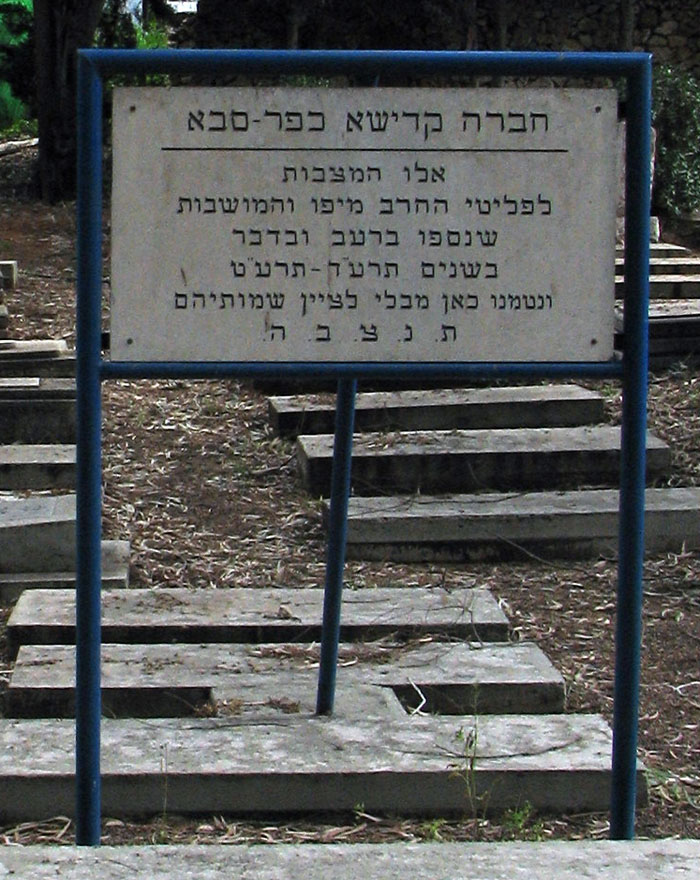
The sign placed in the victims' compound of the Tel Aviv deportation in Kfar Saba.

The deportation and subsequent deaths of so many Jewish deportees were not properly documented.

After Shragai's address, the Kfar Saba City Council voted to change the name "Pilots Street" in the city to "Tel Aviv-Jaffa" Street in October 2009 to commemorate the victims of the deportation. The Tel Aviv Founders' Families Association has been working for years with a burial society to establish a gilad in the Trumpeldor Cemetery in Tel Aviv in memory of those who perished among the deportees from Tel Aviv.

=== In literature ===
Deborah Barun's book, "The Exiles", published in 1970 after her death, centered around the deportation.

Two of Nahum Guttman's books mentioned the deportation, both when it began and after the deportation.

Israeli writer Yosef Chaim Brenner, who was deported and survived, wrote "The Origin" about the deportation which he experienced.

== See also ==
- Nili
- Deportations of Kurds (1916–1934)
- Aliyah and Yishuv during World War I
