= Faik Kurdoğlu =

Turkish politician

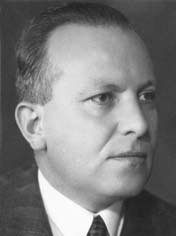

Member of the Grand National Assembly

Personal details
- Born: 1892 Kayseri, Ottoman Empire
- Died: 14 April 1981 (aged 88–89)
- Education: Mekteb-i Mülkiye; Free University of Brussels

Faik Kurdoğlu (1892 – 14 April 1981) was a Turkish writer, politician, and ideologue of Pan-Turkism.
