= Ali Galip Yenen =

Turkish politician

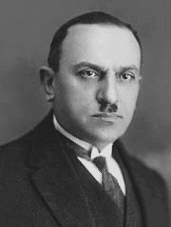

Member of the Grand National Assembly

Personal details
- Born: 1877 istanbul, Ottoman Empire
- Died: 7 May 1948 (aged 70–71) istanbul, Turkey

Ali Galip Yenen (1877 – 7 May 1948) was a Turkish career officer, government minister and antisemitic politician.

== Biography ==
Ali Galip Yenen was one of the leading commanders during the Turkish War of Independence. After graduating from the Military Academy in 1897, he served in various units. On 9 July 1921, during the War of Independence, he was appointed as the Deputy Commander of the Gendarmerie and then to the General Command of the Gendarmerie. While in this post, he was elected to the Grand National Assembly from Niğde (1923) and served in the parliament until the end of the fourth period (1935). He retired from political life on 18 July 1937 at his own request.
