= Sadri Ertem =

Turkish politician

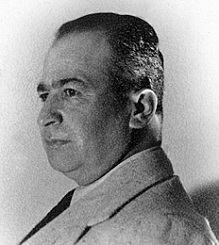

Member of the Grand National Assembly

Personal details
- Born: 1898 Constantinople, Ottoman Empire
- Died: 12 November 1943 (aged 44–45) Ankara, Turkey

Sadri Ertem (1898 – 12 November 1943) was a Turkish writer and Kemalist politician, who was one of the early key members of the CHP.
