= Desivojca =

Desivojcë Desivojca
- Village
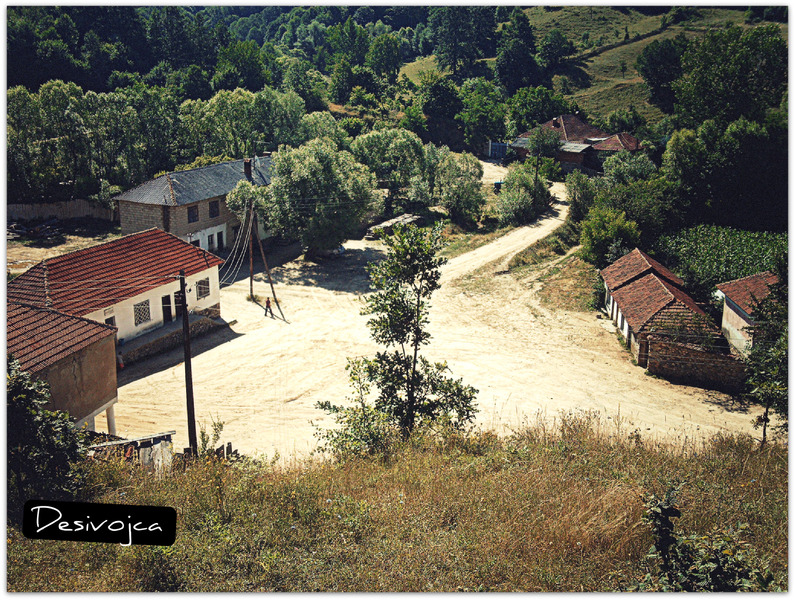
- View of Desivojca

- Location in Kosovo
- Location: Kosovo
- District: Gjilan
- Municipality: Kamenica

Area
  - Total: 16.42 km^{2} (6.34 sq mi)

Population (2024)
  - Total: 8
- Time zone: UTC+1 (CET)
  - Summer (DST): UTC+2 (CEST)

Desivojca is a village in the municipality of Kamenica, in the east of Kosovo. It has 16.41 km^{2} (6.34 sq mi) of land, 89 houses with 755 inhabitants (sources from 1995). It is about 50 km (31 mi) from Gjilan. The village has a primary school called "Kadri Zeka" and a mosque built in 1816. It is a center for surrounding villages.

== Geography ==
In the north it borders with the village of Huruglica, in north-east it borders with the village of Terstena, in the east is situated the village of Zarbinca and Pribovc, from south-east, south and west it is enclosed with the Laqiq village and in north-west is situated the village of Veleglava. Desivojca is a hilly mountainous area, with beautiful landscapes and developed vegetation. A river called Desivojca flows amidst dividing the village in two parts.

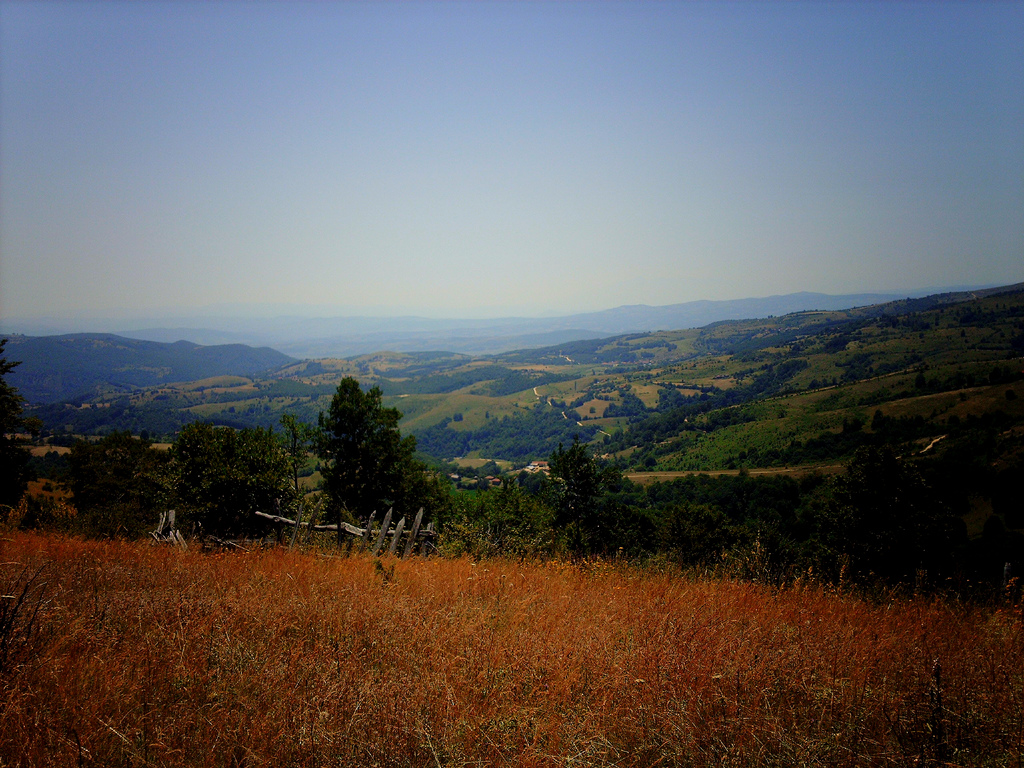
a view from Cipel 1037 m

The highest peaks in this village are:

- Drumi i Xheles (1,228 m or 4,029 ft),
- Rrafshi (1,157 m or 3,796 ft),
- Strajdeja (1,138 m or 3,734 ft),
- Maja e Zezë (1,094 m or 3,589 ft),
- Maja e Sreshnjes 1070m,
- Cipeli 1037m,
- and the lowest attitude in Desivojca is Mulliri i Robajve 660m.

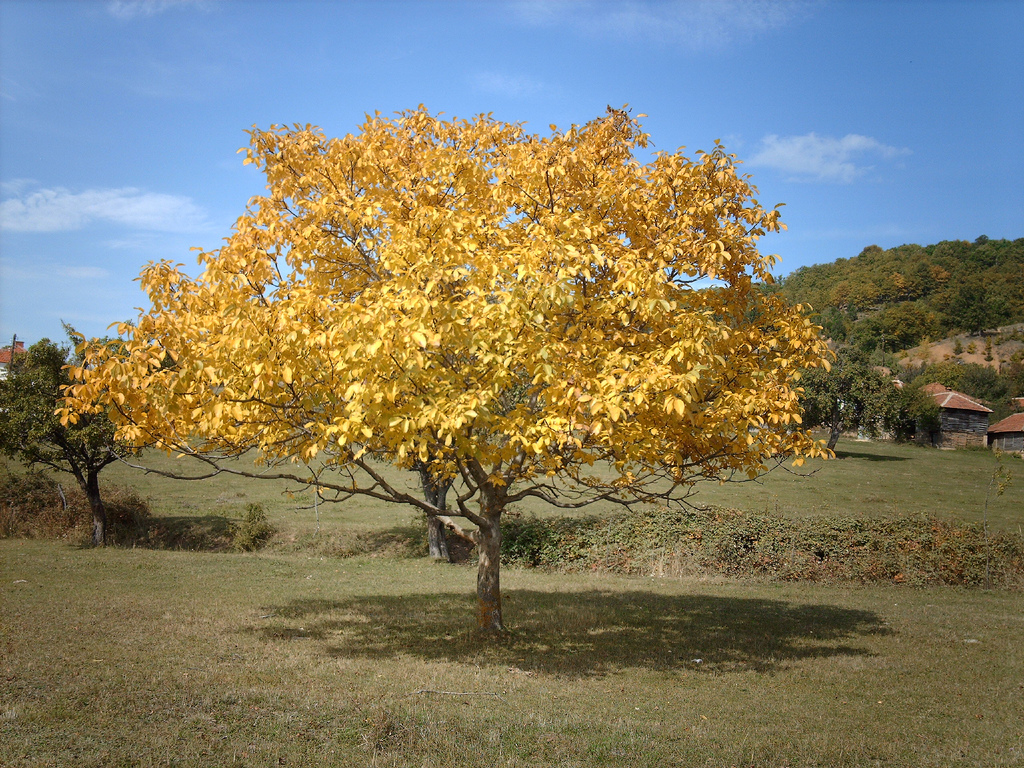
Beautiful autumn view in the Komani neighborhood

== Demographics ==
Desivojca has four main neighborhoods: Bunjaku, Padina, Komani and Zhigolli.

There are 12 main groups of families that live in Desivojca:

- Bunjaku (origin of Albania)
- Shkodra family, (migrated into the village from Shkodër)
- Dragobuzhda,
- Mellova,
- Beshtica,
- Gurguroci,
- Gagica,
- Surdulli,
- Klaiqi
- Rukoci
- Bajraliu
- Robelli

Many inhabitants from this village now live in urban centers like Gjilan, Kamenica, Pristina, and Ferizaj.

== Gallery ==
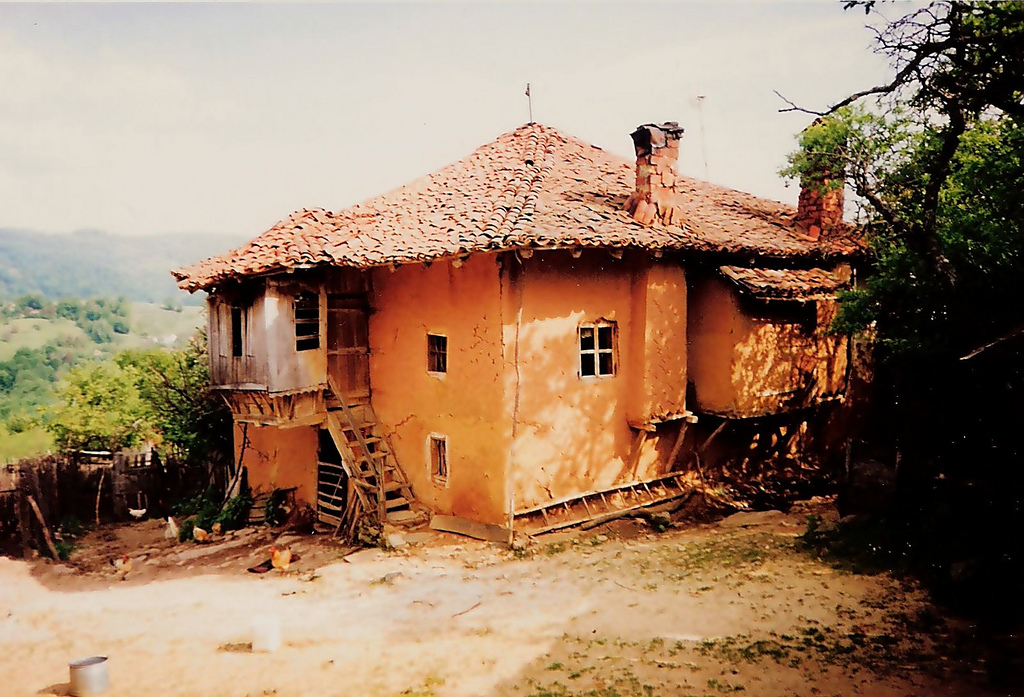

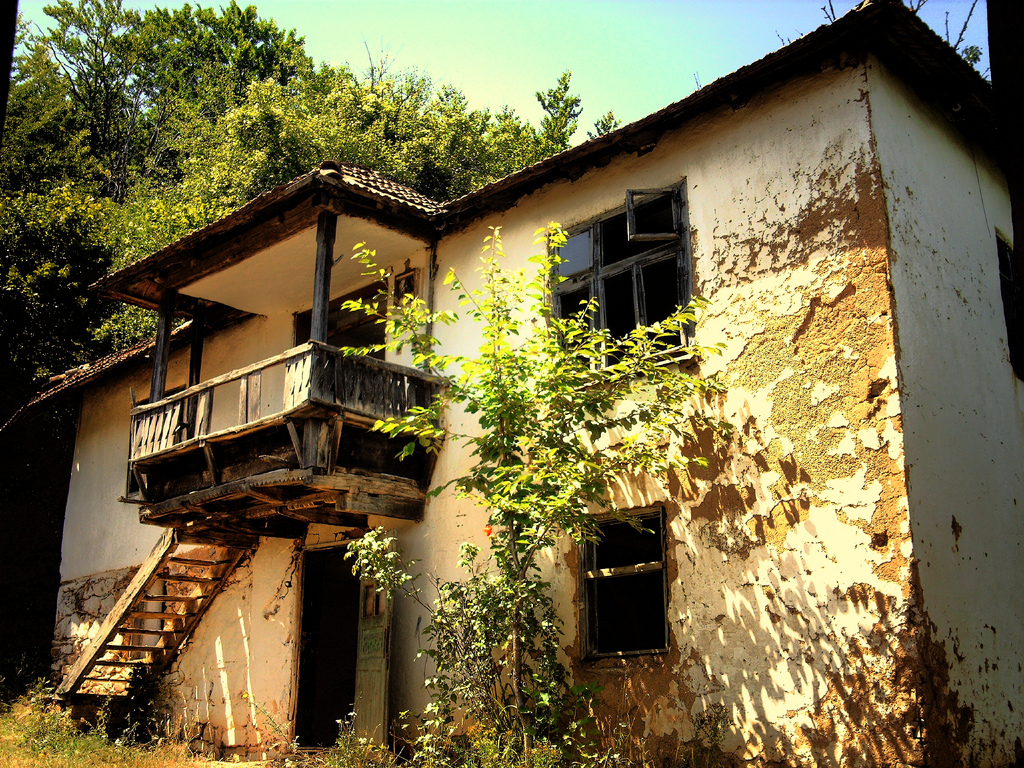

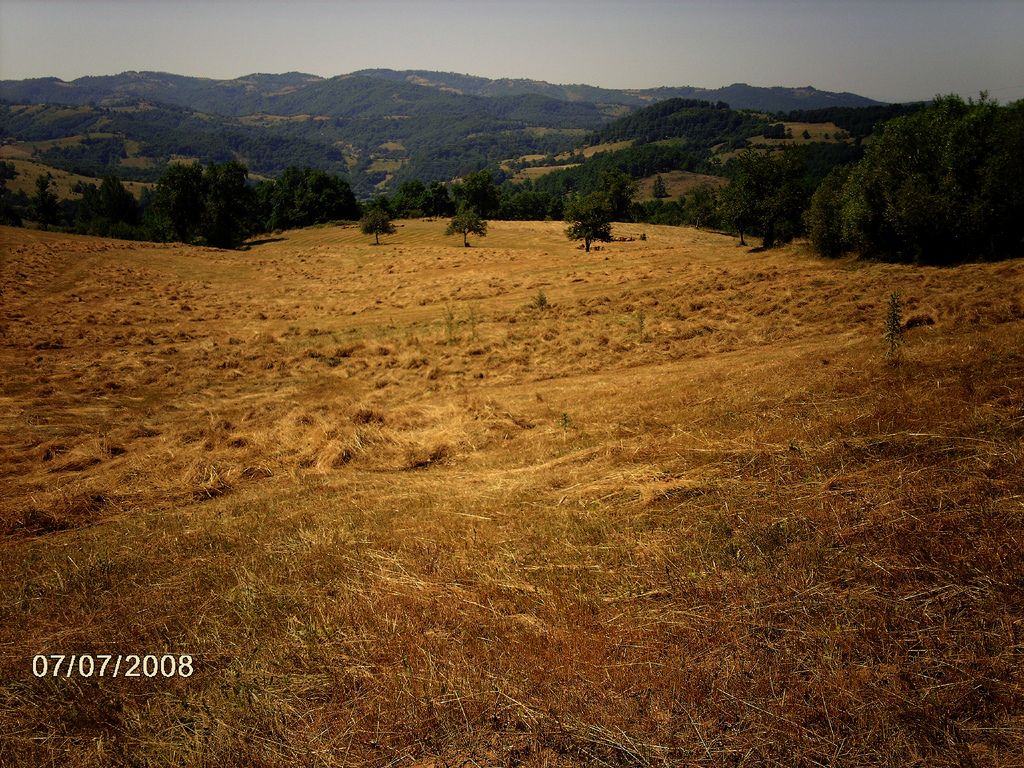

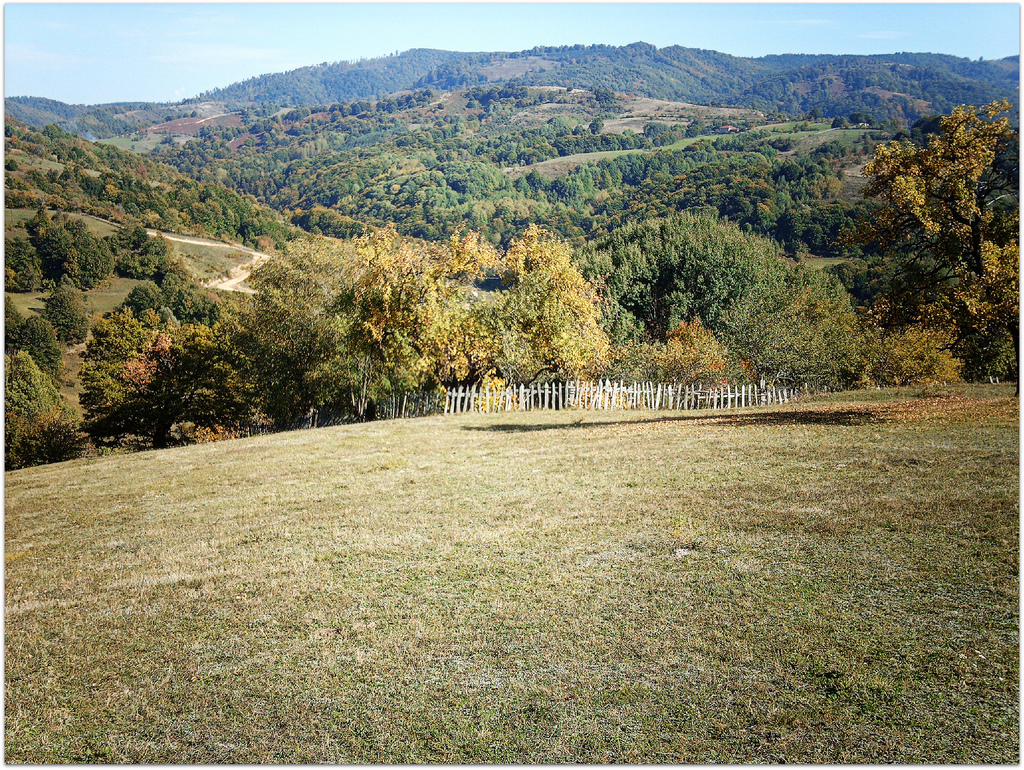

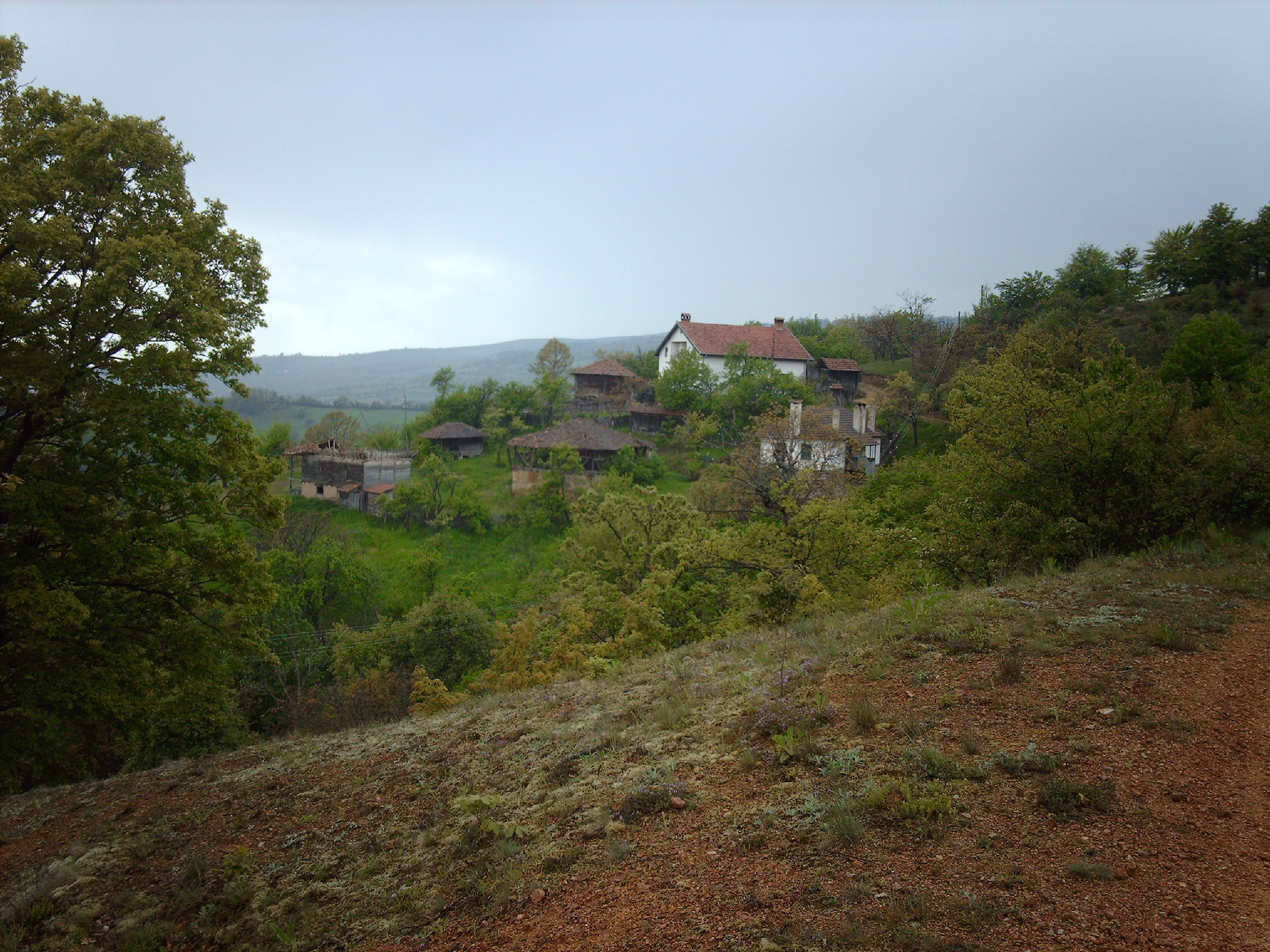

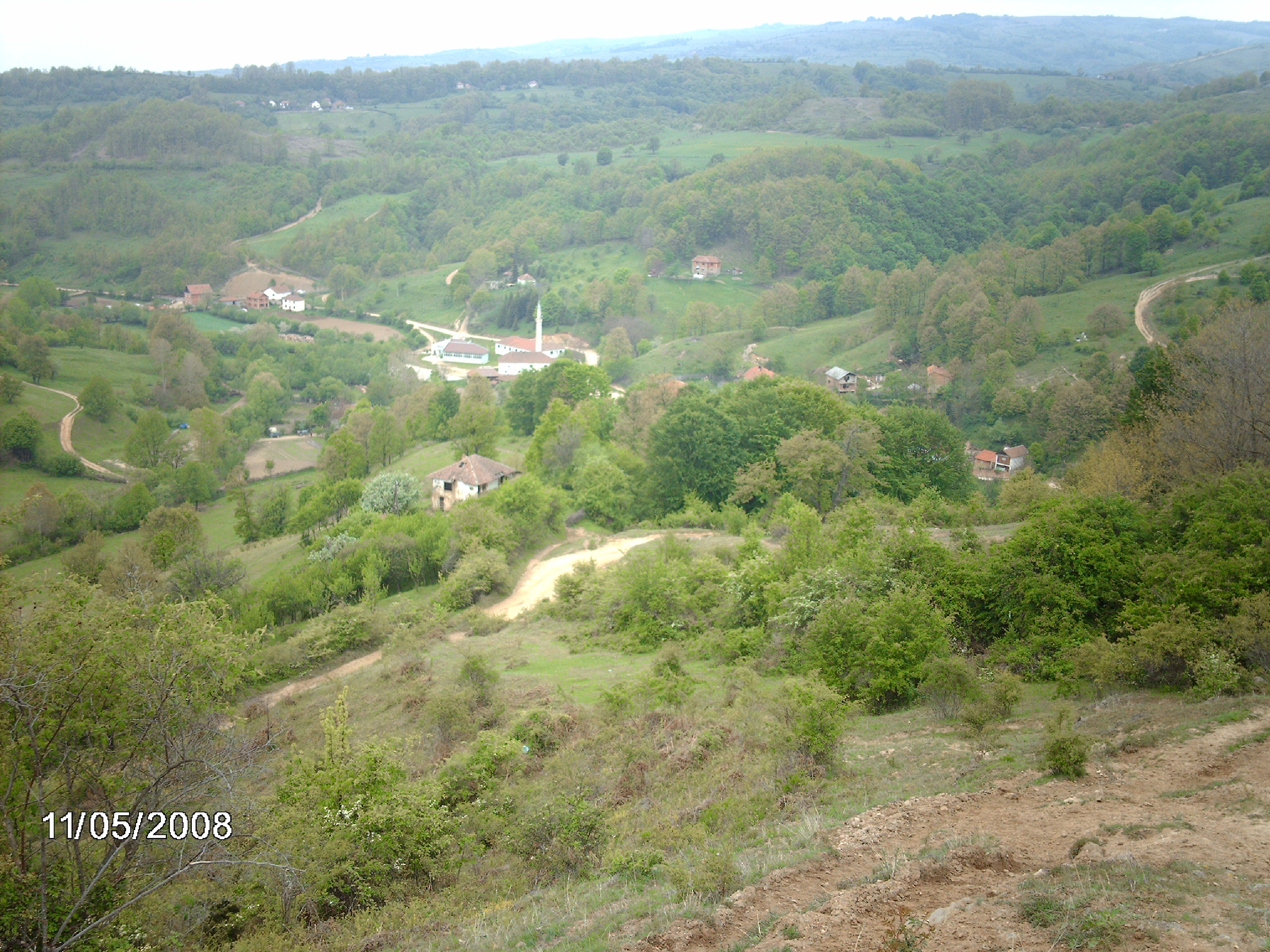

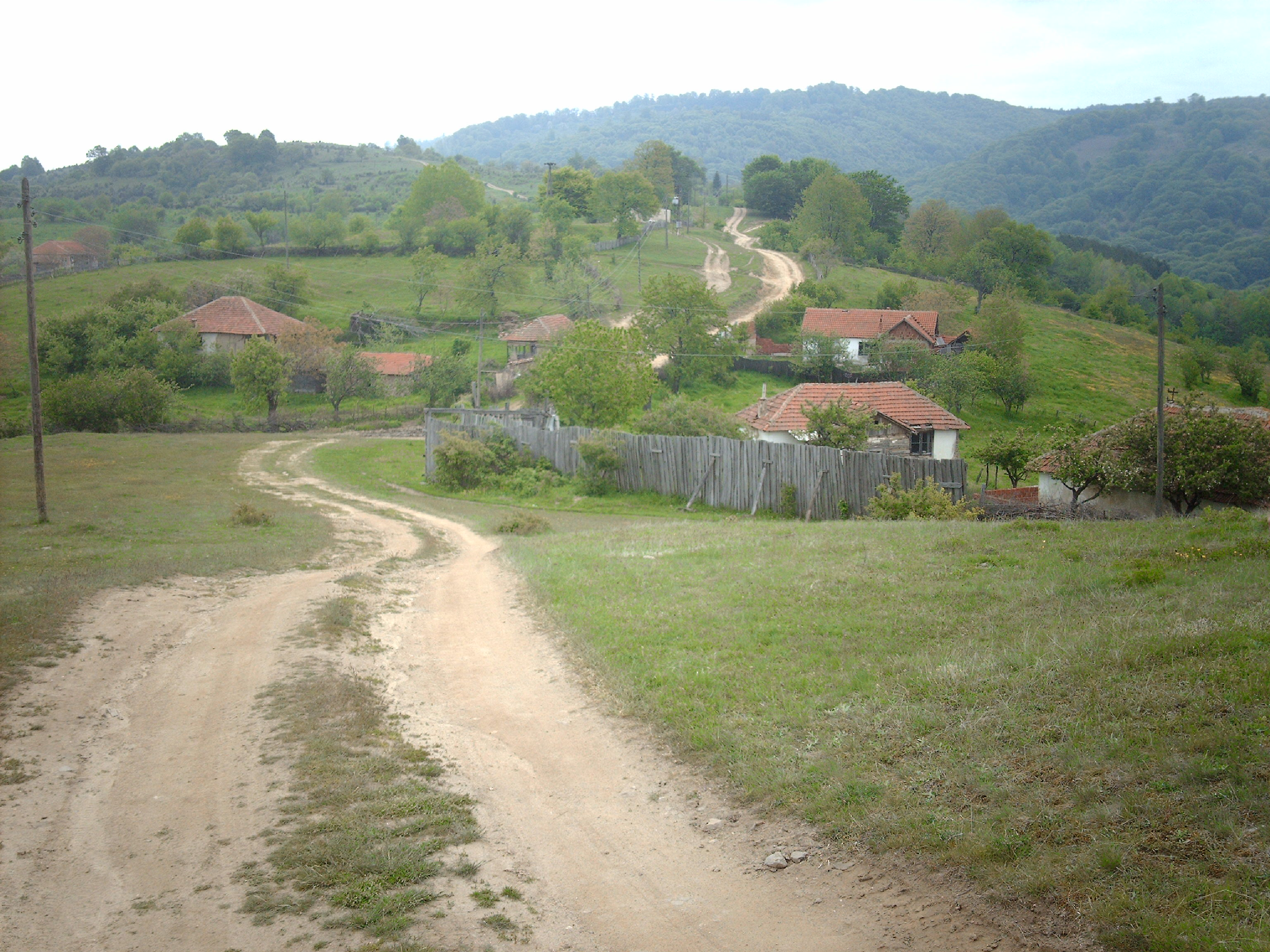

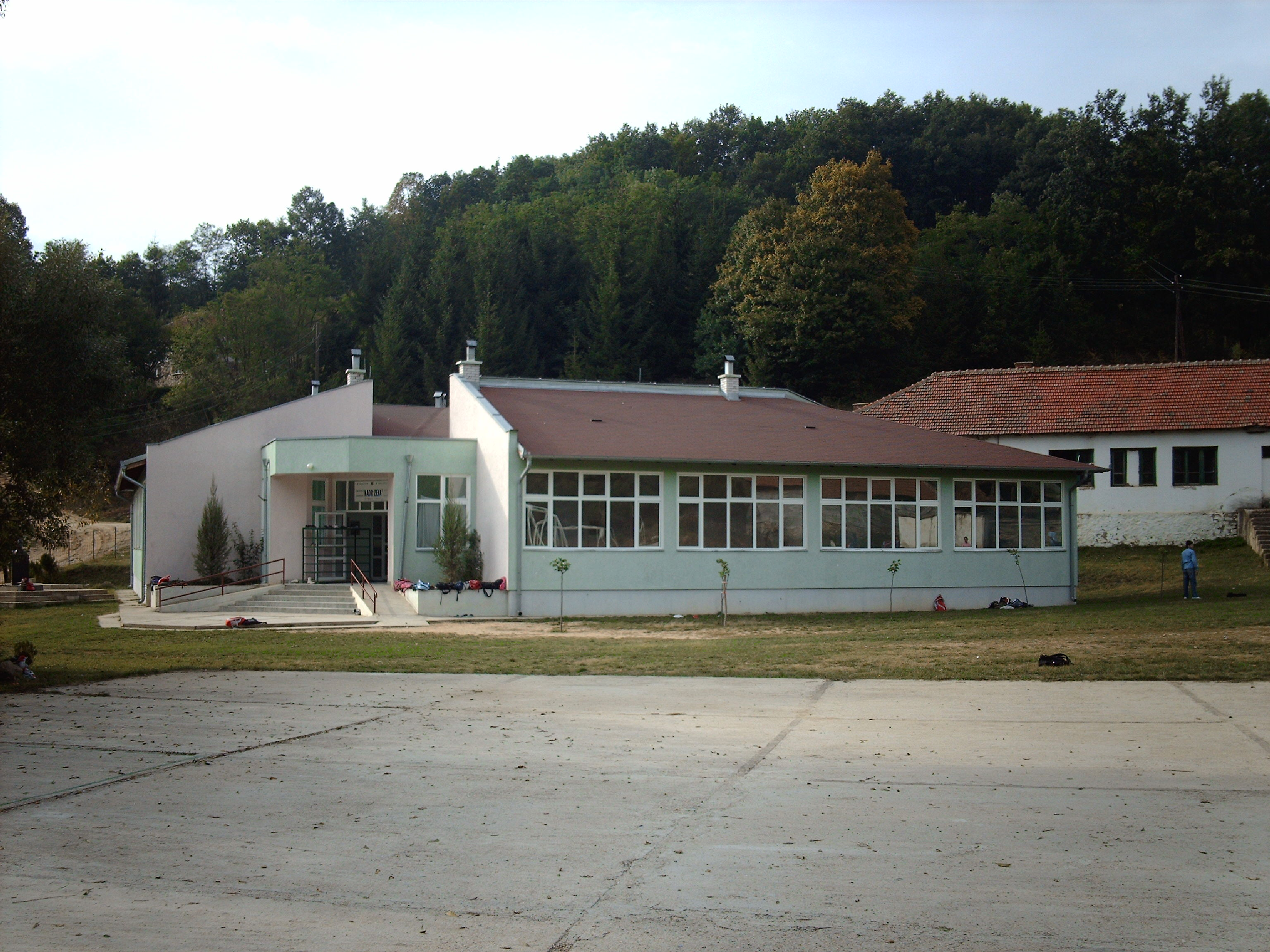

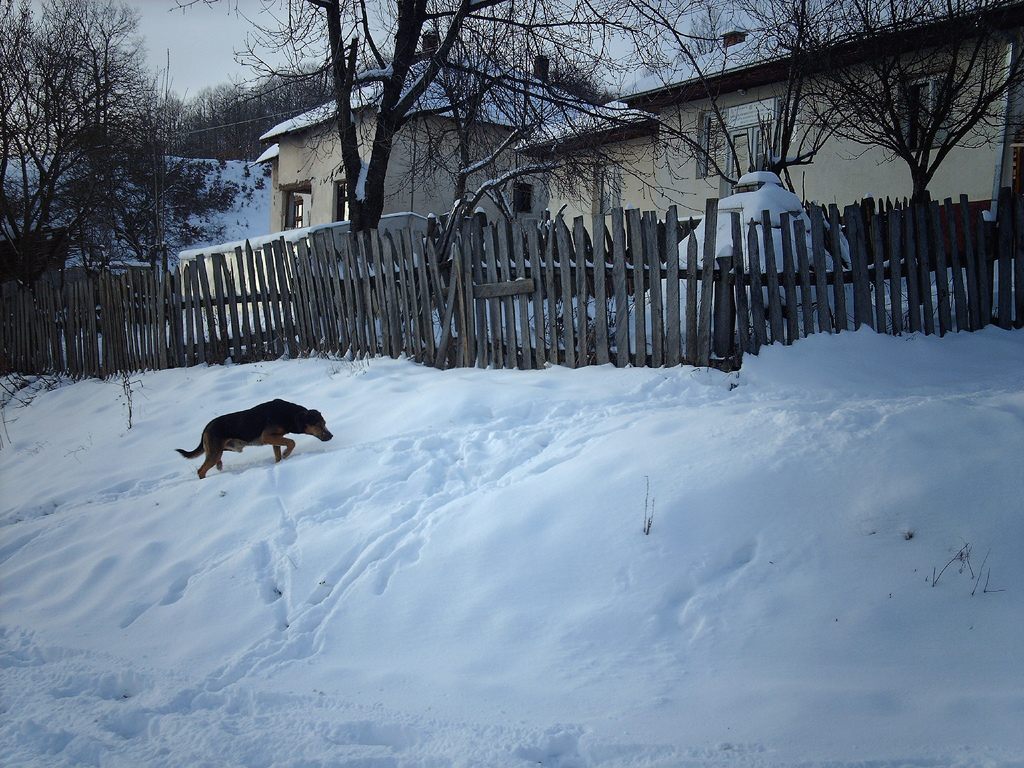

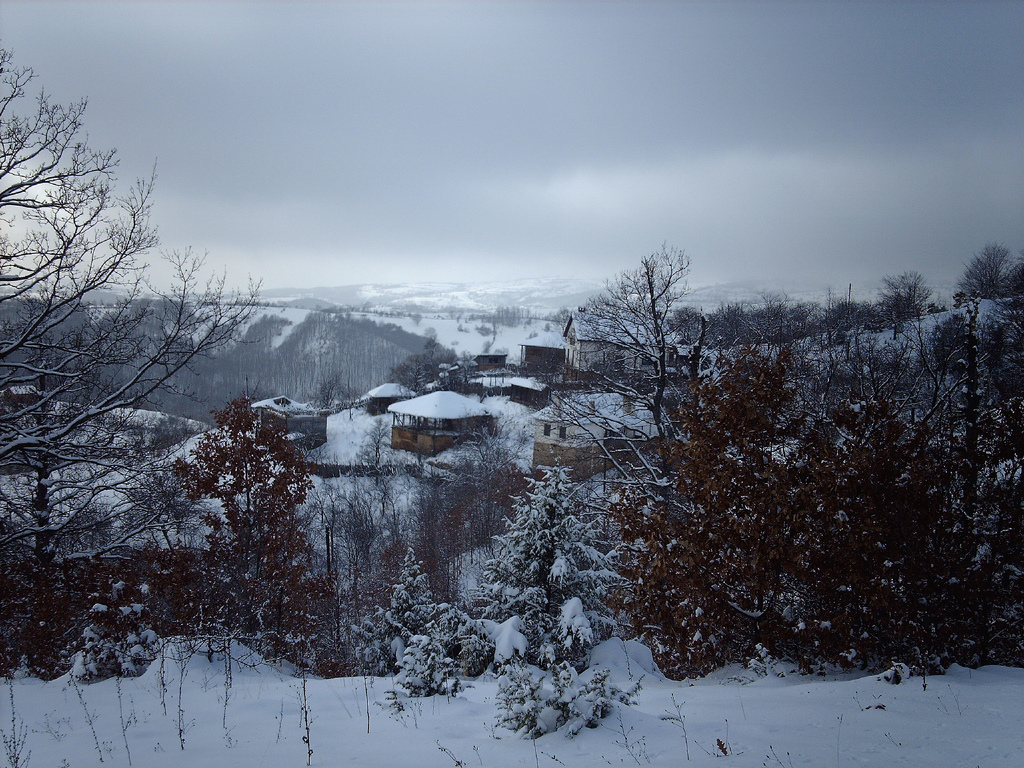

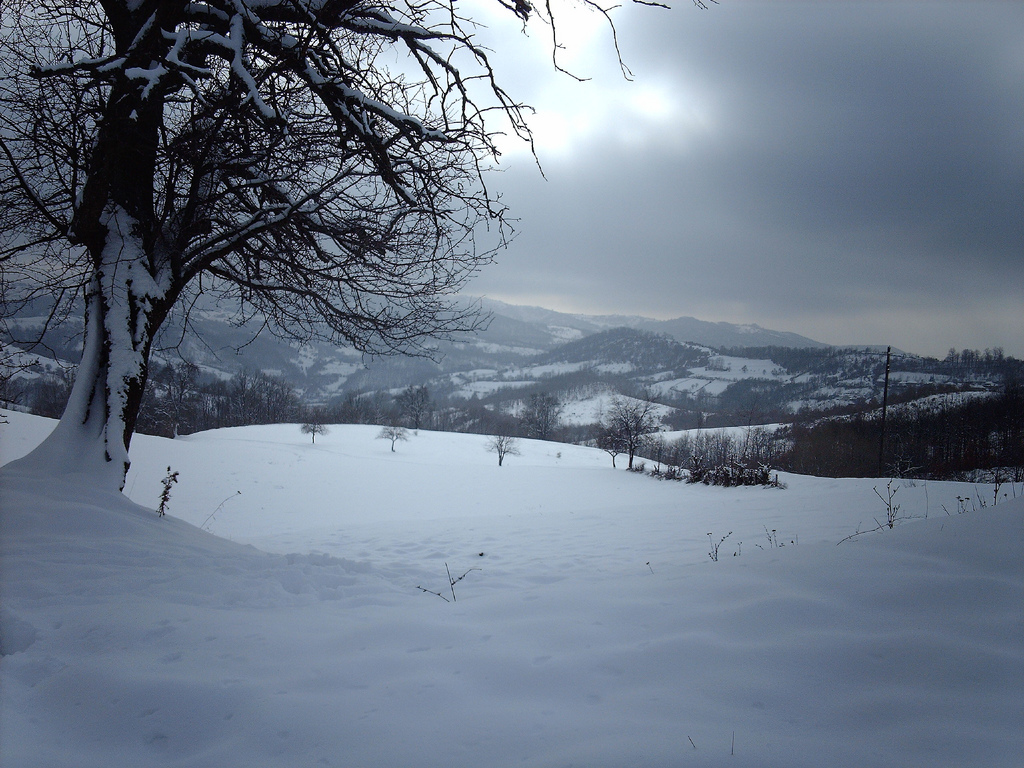

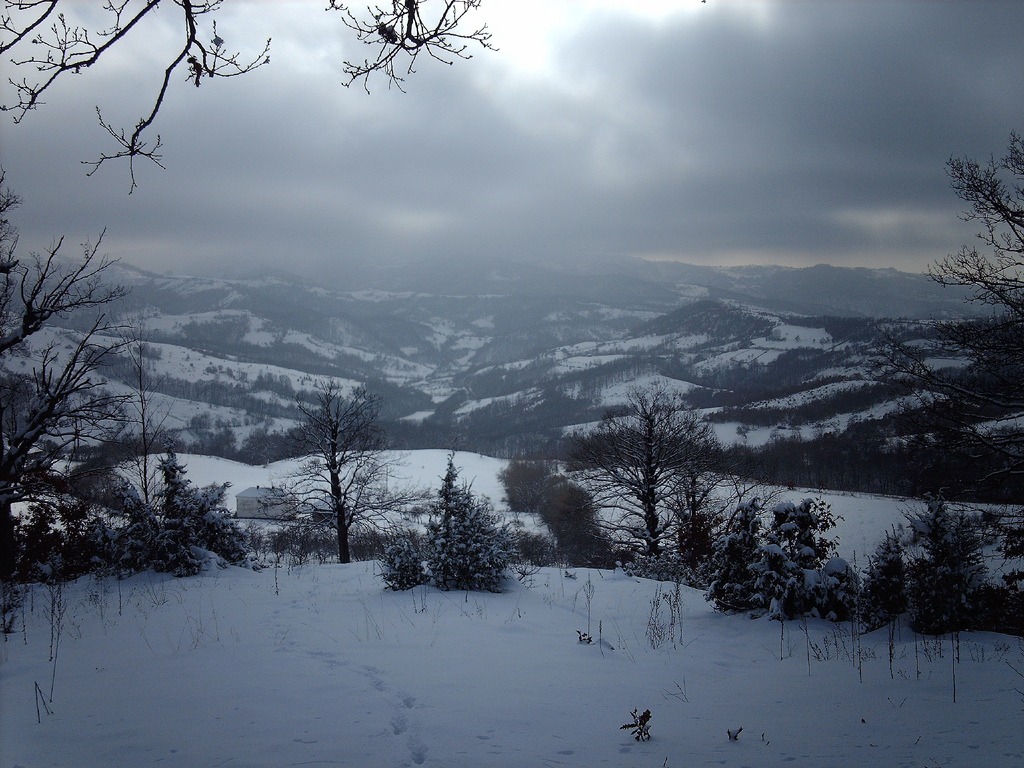
