= Mehmet Akif Ersoy =

Turkish poet, writer, academic, politician (1873–1936)

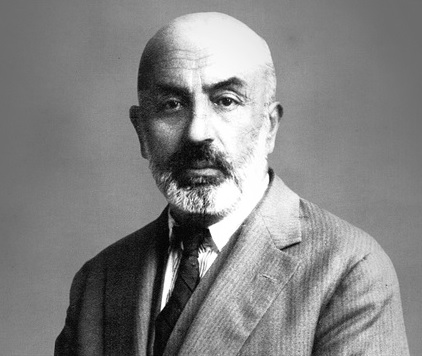
- Ersoy in the 1930s
- Born: Mehmed Ragîf; 20 December 1873; Istanbul, Ottoman Empire
- Died: 27 December 1936 (aged 63); Istanbul, Turkey
- Occupations: Poet, author and politician
- Spouse: İsmet Hanım (m. 1898)
- Children: 5
- Writing career
- Notable works: Safahat, İstiklâl Marşı
- Literary movement: The republican era

Signature
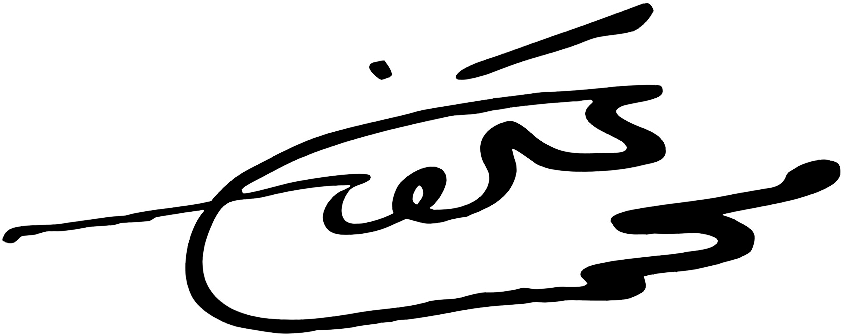

Mehmet Akif Ersoy (20 December 1873 – 27 December 1936) was a Turkish poet, writer, academic, politician, and the author of the Turkish National Anthem. Widely regarded as one of the premiere literary minds of his time, Ersoy is noted for his command of the Turkish language, as well as his patriotism and role in the Turkish War of Independence.

A framed version of the national anthem by Ersoy typically occupies the wall above the blackboard in the classrooms of every public as well as most private schools around Turkey, along with a Turkish flag, a photograph of the country's founding father Atatürk, and a copy of Atatürk's speech to the nation's youth.

== Biography ==
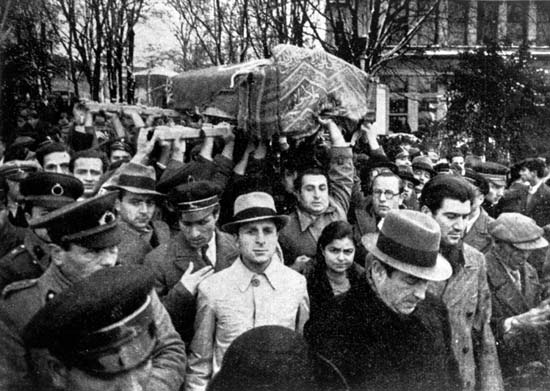
Funeral of Mehmet Akif Ersoy, 28 December 1936

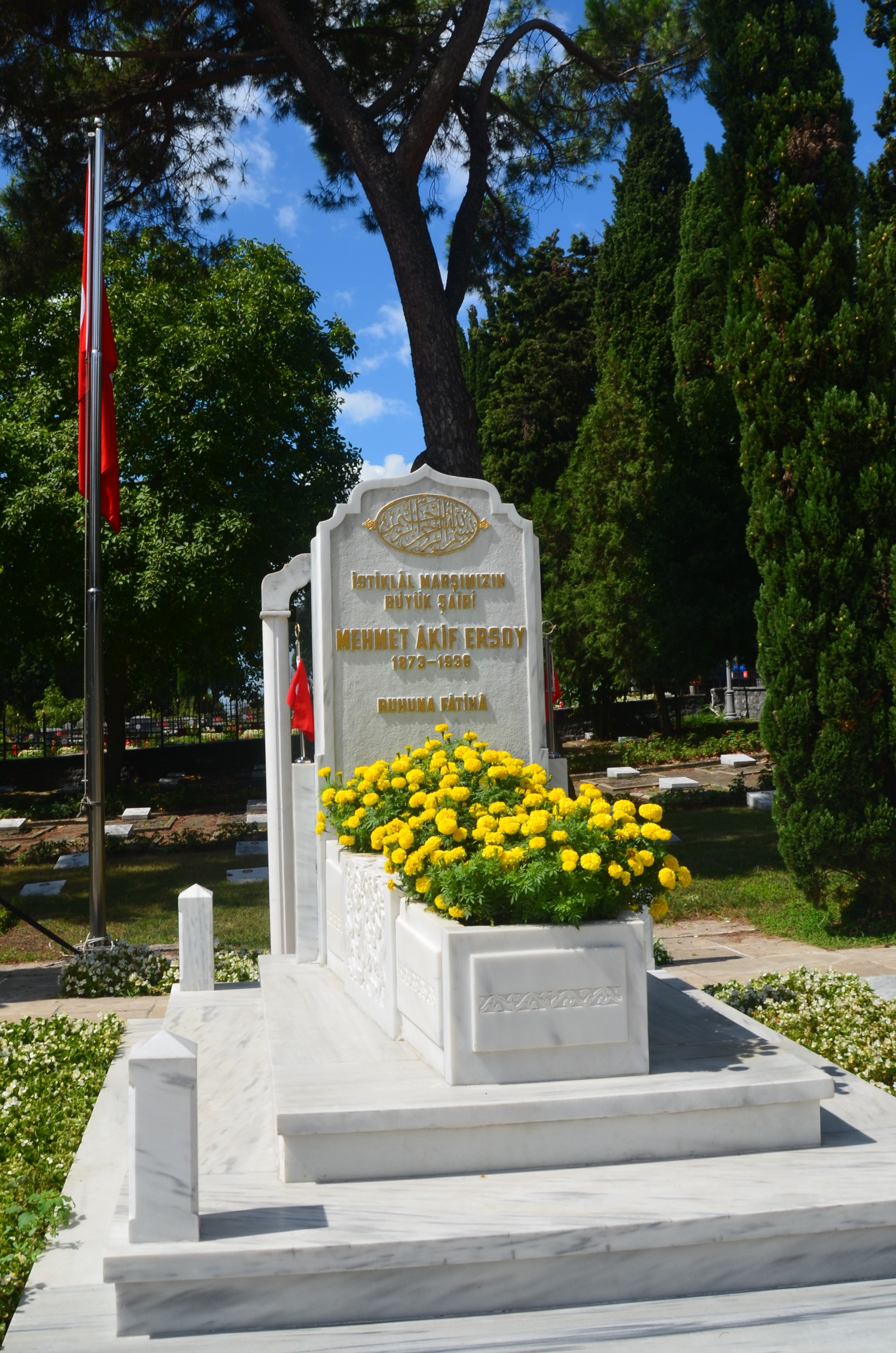
Grave of Mehmet Akif Ersoy at Edirnekapı Cemetery, Istanbul.

Mehmet Akif Ersoy was born Mehmed Ragîf in Istanbul, Ottoman Empire in 1873 to İpekli Tahir Efendi (1826–1888), an Albanian from the village Shushica near Istog, nahiyah of Ipek and Emine Şerife Hanım with Turkish and Uzbek origins from Bukhara (modern-day Uzbekistan). His father was a tutor at the Fatih Madrasah, at a time when all institutions of the state were in terminal decline, and major crises and regime changes were underway. He grew up in the Fatih district of Constantinople and learned Arabic and memorized the Quran under the mentorship of his father. As he was about to complete his education at the Fatih Merkez Rüştiyesi, his father's death and a fire that destroyed his home forced Ersoy to discontinue his education and to start working to support his family. He wanted to start a professional career as soon as possible, and he entered the Mülkiye Baytar Mektebi (Veterinary School), and graduated in 1893.

In the same year, Mehmet Akif Ersoy joined the civil service and conducted research on contagious diseases in various locations in Anatolia. During these assignments, in line with his religious inclination, he gave sermons in mosques, and tried to educate the people and to raise their awareness. Following its success in the Young Turk revolution, he joined the Committee for Union and Progress in 1908. Along with fellow men-of-letters Recaizade Mahmud Ekrem, Abdülhak Hâmid Tarhan and Cenap Şahabettin, which he had met in 1913, he worked for the publication branch of the Müdafaa-i Milliye Heyeti. In his sermons in the mosque, he urged for the union of the different ethnicities in the Ottoman Empire. He was dismissed from his post at the Darülfünün in Constantinople in late 1913 due to his criticism on how the Ottoman Government acted during the Balkan wars. He soon resigned from his government position and other occupations, and wrote poems and articles for the publication Sırat-ı Müstakim.

During the collapse of the Ottoman Empire, Mehmet Akif Ersoy was a fervent patriot. He made important contributions to the struggle for the declaration of the Turkish Republic, and advocated patriotism through speeches that he delivered in many mosques in Anatolia. On 19 November 1920, during a famous speech he gave in Kastamonu's Nasrullah Mosque, he condemned the Treaty of Sèvres, and invited the people to use their faith and guns to fight and wage jihad (holy war) against the Western colonialists. When the publication Sebilürreşat, which was then operating out of Ankara, published this speech, it spread all over the country and was even made into a pamphlet distributed to Turkish soldiers.

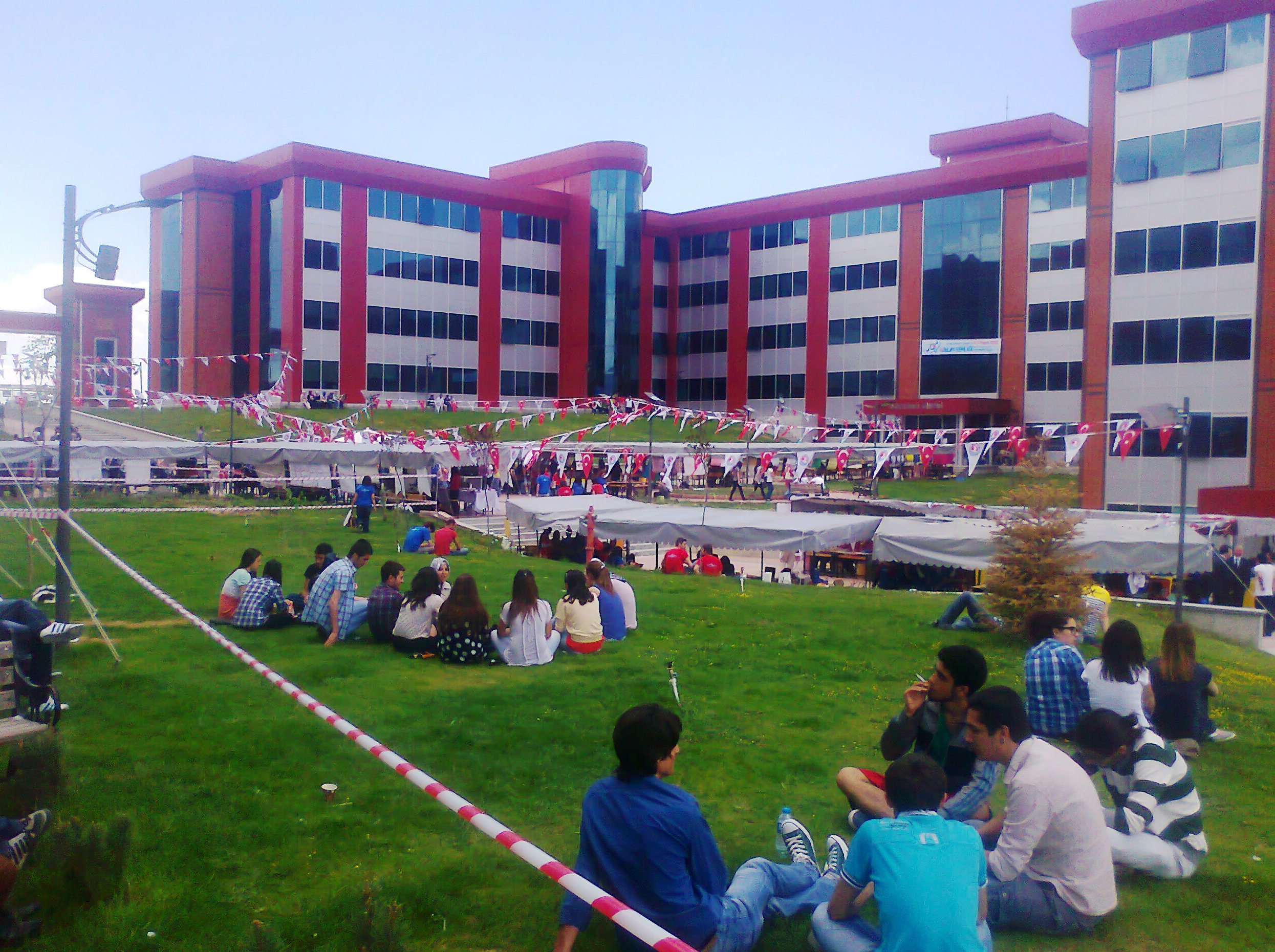
Mehmet Akif Ersoy University

However, Mehmet Akif Ersoy earned himself his significant place in the history of the Republic of Turkey as the composer of the lyrics of the Turkish National Anthem. During the session of 12 March 1921, the Turkish Grand National Assembly officially designated his ten-quatrain poem as the lyrics of the national anthem.

Ersoy moved to Cairo in 1925 and taught the Turkish language at a university there during his 11-year stay. He caught malaria during a visit to Lebanon and returned to Turkey shortly before his death in Istanbul in 1936.

Ersoy was an Islamist and an opponent of Kemalism. Despite being the poet of the national anthem, when he died, no official funeral ceremony was held by the government. His coffin was met by Istanbul University students in Beyazıt Square and carried to the Beyazıt Mosque by the students. During the funeral ceremony, students chanted slogans against the government. He was interred in the Edirnekapı Martyr's Cemetery in Istanbul and was the first person in the history of the Republic of Turkey to have the national anthem performed at his funeral ceremony.

== Legacy ==
Mehmet Akif Ersoy is an important national figure in the history of modern Turkey and has left an immortal trace in its history. During the republican period, Mehmet Akif Ersoy taught history and literature at various universities. Ersoy agreed to translate the Quran into the Turkish language for the Directorate of Religious Affairs, but eventually didn't deliver his version. He was worried the Kemalists would further separate Islam from the Arabic language, after they had imposed a Turkish call to prayer instead of the one in Arabic. A university in Burdur was named after him. Ersoy's portrait was depicted on the reverse of the Turkish 100 lira banknotes of 1983–1989.

== Works ==
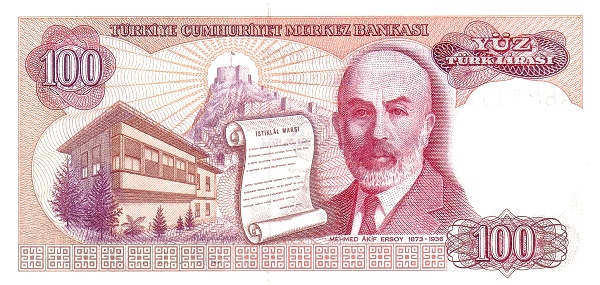
Reverse of the 100 lira banknote (1983–1989)

Mehmet Akif Ersoy had abundant knowledge concerning traditional eastern literature. In addition, he also studied the works of authors such as Victor Hugo, Alphonse de Lamartine, Émile Zola, and Alphonse Daudet.

He is best known for his 1911 work entitled Safahat. This volume is a collection of 44 poems of various lengths by Mehmet Akif Ersoy. The earliest work that appears in this book is dated 1904, but this is unattested, and it is highly likely that the poet, who was 32 on that particular date, composed poems prior to that date.

He is further noted for writing the lyrics of Turkish National Anthem, İstiklâl Marşı (The March of Independence in English) – which was adopted in 1921, and is accepted by many Turks as their "National Poet". The lyrics were originally written as a poem in a collection of his writings. Paradoxically, one of his most famous works, a book called Safahat, was not widely read or published until recently. He studied veterinary science at the university.

== See also ==
- Mehmet Akif Literature Museum Library, Ankara
