= Safahat =

Safahat is a collection of poems of the Turkish poet, Mehmet Akif Ersoy, considered one of the last classic poets of Turkish literature.

The collection has been compiled from seven poetry books published between 1911 and 1933. It includes 11,240 verses and 108 different poems. The seven books are; Safahat (Articles, 1911), Süleymaniye Kürsüsünde (1912), Hakkın Sesleri (1913), Fatih Kürsüsünde (1914), Hatıralar (1917), Asım (1924), and Gölgeler (1933).
