= Belkind =

Belkind is an Ashkenazi Jewish surname. Notable people with the surname include:

- Israel Belkind, Jewish educator, author, writer, historian and founder of the Bilu movement
- Lev Belkind, Soviet scientist, engineer and historian; author of numerous publications on the history of science and technology
- Na'aman Belkind, member of Nili, a ring of Jewish spies working for the British in World War
- Olga Hankin née Belkind, feminist, professional midwife and Zionist activist
- Osnat Belkind Scheps (born 1961), Israeli artist
- Sonia Belkind, the first gynecologist in Ottoman Palestine

== See also ==
- Belkin (surname)
