= Na'aman Belkind =

Jewish spy (1888–1917)

- נעמן בלקינד
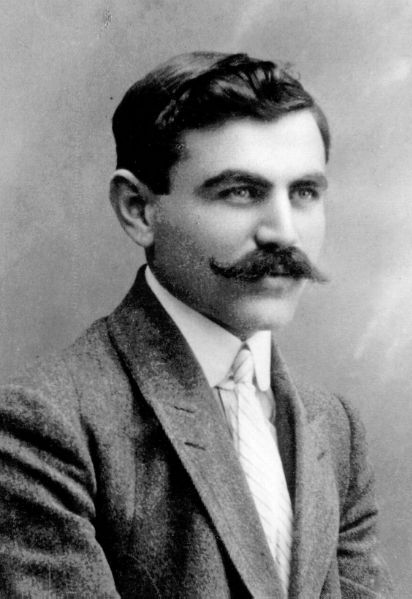
- Born: 16 December 1888; Gedera, Ottoman Empire
- Died: 16 December 1917 (aged 29); Damascus, Ottoman Syria, Ottoman Empire
- Cause of death: Execution by hanging
- Resting place: Rishon LeZion
- Occupation: Spy
- Parents: Shimshon Belkind (father); Penina Belkind (mother)

Na'aman Belkind (Hebrew: נעמן בלקינד; 16 December 1888 - 16 December 1917) was a member of Nili, a ring of Jewish spies working for the British in World War I. Belkind was caught by the Ottmans in September 1917 and was sentenced to death. He was hanged in Damascus with Yosef Lishansky. Their execution marked the fall of the Nili movement.

== Early life ==
Belkind was born in Gedera, then in Ottoman Palestine, to Penina and Shimshon Belkind who were part of the Bilu movement and among the founders of Rishon LeZion. His father, Shimshon Belkind was a Bilu pioneer. He was also the nephew of Bilu founder Israel Belkind, and of Sonia Belkind, the first female gynecologist in the land of Israel. Belkind studied at the first Hebrew school of Gedera, and later attended the Alliance Israélite Universelle school in Jerusalem and Egypt.

== Nili activities and death ==
Belkind was among the first Jews to enlist in the Ottoman army. However, upon the Ottoman alliance with the Germans during World War I, he recognized that the empire was likely to face defeat. Subsequently, he joined his cousin Avshalom Feinberg, and was one of the first Nili members.

In January 1917, Avshalom Feinberg and Yosef Lishansky went to a mission to meet with the British in Egypt, In the mission they were attacked by two Ottoman soldiers and a gang of Bedouin. Lishansky survived the attack and managed to reach a British patrol while Feinberg was killed.

In September 1917, Following the attack, Belkind doubted the reports about Feinberg's death and went to Egypt to investigate himself. Caught by Beduin in the Sinai, he was handed over to the Ottomans and brought to Damascus. He was charged with spying and tortured in jail.

While Belkind was in jail, the Ottomans found out about a cell in Zikhron Yaakov and caught most of Nili activists.

In October 1917, He was hanged in Damascus with Yosef Lishansky who was caught in Zikhron Yaakov.

On 24 October 1919, the body of Belknd was brought to Palestine and buried in Rishon LeZion. Belkind had a wife and a one year old baby at the time of his death. 60 years after his death the Nili Ribbon was given to his family.

== Legacy ==
In 1982 he was featured in the stamp set "Martyrs of the Struggle for Israel's Independence".
