= Belkin (surname) =

Belkin (Russian: Белкин), or Belkina (feminine; Белкина), Hebrew: בלקין is a surname of Russian or Jewish origin. The Russian surname is derived either from the Russian word belka, meaning squirrel and is associated with the old Russian noble Belkin family. The Jewish one is a matronymic surname derived from the Jewish given name Beylke, a diminutive from Beyle. Notable people with the surname include:

- Arnold Belkin (1930–1992), Mexican painter
- Beatrice Belkin (1902–1998), American soprano singer
- Boris Belkin (born 1948), Russian-born violin virtuoso
- Katerina Belkina (born 1974), Russian photographer and painter
- Lena Belkina (born 1987), Ukrainian opera singer
- Mike Belkin (born 1945), Canadian tennis player
- John N. Belkin, Professor of Entomology UCLA
- Nicholas J. Belkin, professor at School of Communication at Rutgers University
- Olga Belkina (born 1990), Russian sprinter
- Samuel Belkin (1911–1976), president of the Yeshiva University
- Steve Belkin, businessman and owner of Atlanta Thrashers and Atlanta Hawks
- Valeria Belkina (born 1999), Russian female acrobatic gymnast

== Fictional characters ==
- Ivan Petrovich Belkin, the namesake of The Belkin Tales by Russian poet and writer Alexander Pushkin

== See also ==
- Belkind
