= History of the Jews in Ústí nad Labem =

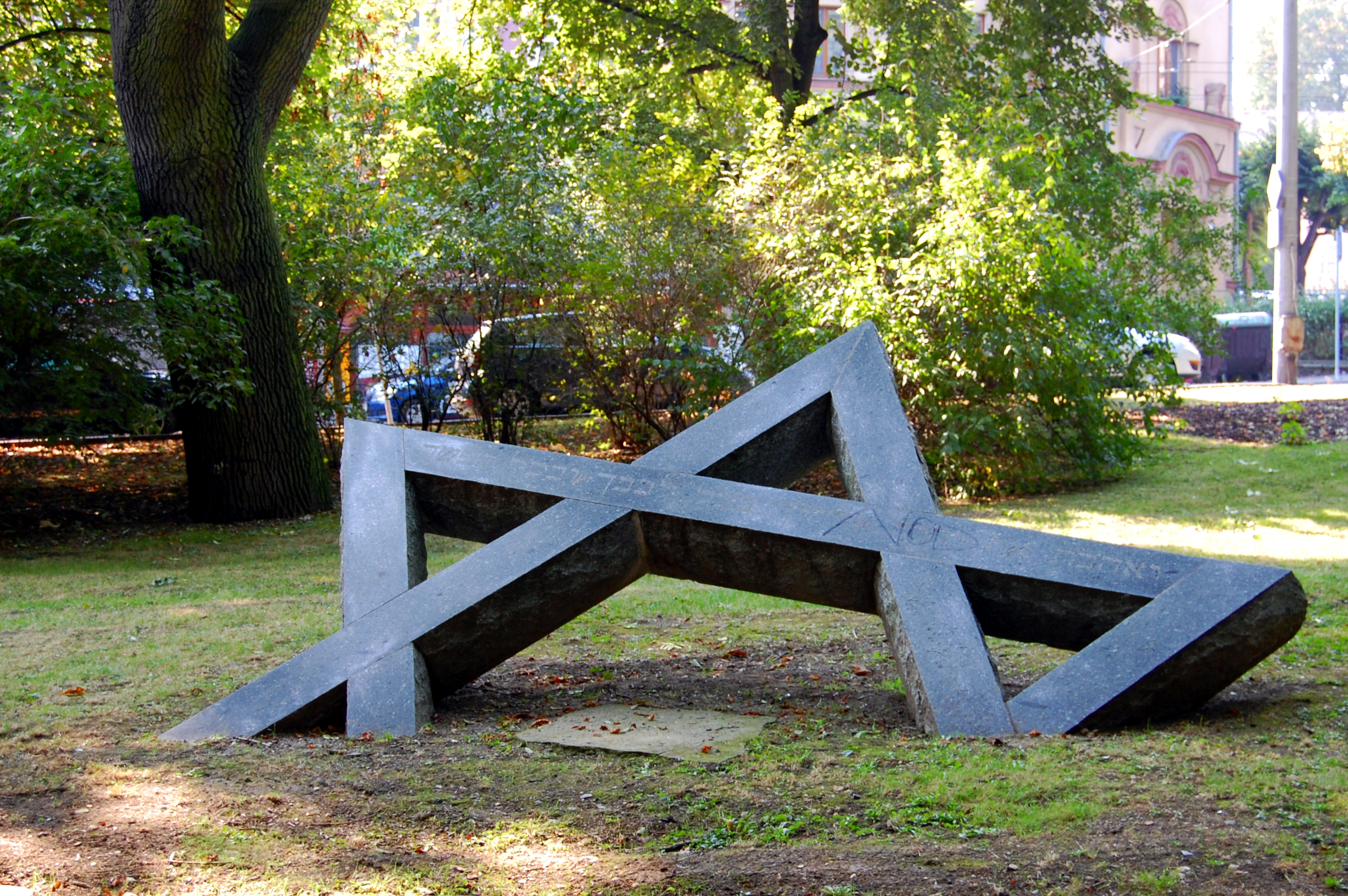
Holocaust memorial built in 2005.

The history of the Jews in Ústí nad Labem in the Czech Republic dates back to 1848, following the emancipation of Austrian Jews. The greatest expansion achieved was owing to the presence of two significant families (Weinman and Petschek), who contributed to city development, at the end of the 19th and at the beginning of the 20th century. Two following dictatorships had devastating effect on the community. Most Jews fled prior to or during World War II. In November 1938, after the Munich Agreement, the few Jews that remained in Ústí were sent to extermination camps.

== 19th century and pre-war history ==
After Austrian emancipation, Jews were free to live in Ústí without facing residence restrictions. Four families from nearby Teplice were the first Jews to settle in the city, and a prayer house was opened not long after.

The community did not become officially organized until 1863, and it was recognized by the authorities in 1869. The Jewish cemetery was consecrated in 1866, and then closed in 1893 when the Jewish community was given a section in the general cemetery. In 1880, thirty Jewish families came together to found a synagogue, and its opening ceremony was attended by other nearby Jewish communities and local non-Jewish officials.

In 1910, the Jewish community numbered 2,000. World War I brought more Jews to Ústí, mainly refugees from Galicia. The local Jewish community did not welcome them with open arms or want them to stay, and instead gave them money to move somewhere else. After the war, the newly established Republic of Czechoslovakia acknowledged Jews as a national minority, with the rights that go along with it. Jews in Ústí mostly spoke German prior to the rise of Czech nationalism and culture. In 1921, the Jewish population was 976.

Zionism also took root in the Ústí Jewish community after Czech independence. The Zionist student organization founded by Theodor Herzl opened a branch in the city in 1911. In 1919, a plethora of other Zionist organizations set up in the city, including a Maccabi sports club, Blau Weiss hiking society, and the Women's International Zionist Organization (WIZO). That year, at the first Zionist conference in Prague, a doctor from Ústí was elected to the central committee of Zionist organizations. In 1926, a number of Ústí Jews purchased membership and voting rights prior to the 15th Zionist Congress, and in 1937, 134 members of the Ústí community voted in the 20th Zionist Congress. During the 1930s, a training center for youth preparing to move to Mandatory Palestine was established, and about 20 youth from Ústí made aliyah and became pioneers. Also in this time, an increasing amount of the community declared their nationality as Jewish. A notable Jewish figure in the city was Viktor Ullmann, who was the opera conductor.

In 1930, the Jewish population of the city was 985, and after the rise of the Nazi Party in Germany, many Jews in the community began to emigrate.

== World War II and the Holocaust ==
In September 1938, the Munich Agreement dissolved the Republic of Czechoslovakia and annexed Ústí and the Sudeten Region into Nazi Germany. Much of the Jewish community fled to Latvia, Slovakia, other parts of Europe, or to North America. Some Ústí Jews fought with the Czech Army. In 1939, the synagogue was burnt down. After, the remaining Jews in the city were sent to a deserted palace in the mountain town of Schoenwald-Krasny. A printer with the last name Levi was chosen as the community's leader. They then began forced labor, and after a period of six weeks, the women were sent back to Ústí while the men were sent to Oranienburg. Ultimately, they were all sent to the Theresienstadt ghetto and then concentration or death camps, where most were killed in the Holocaust.

== Post-war ==
Religious intolerance continued even after the war and that is other reason why many of the members of this community emigrated afterwards. Still, after the Soviet annexation of Carpatho-Rus, many Jews chose to move here. This population established a new Ústí synagogue in 1948 with 800 members. As of the early 21st century, the congregation continued to exist.

There were changes in religious freedoms after 1989. Members of the community meet regularly during worships, especially during Jewish festivals. Still, life in the community is declining, particularly because of absence of young generation. There were 50 members of the community in 2000, of which 17 lived in Ústí nad Labem. There were 38 recorded members of the community in half of 2005. The contemporary chairman is Bedřich Heller.

== Bibliography ==
- Fedorovič, T., Kaiser, V. History of Jewish community in Ústí nad Labem. 2005, 123 p. English translation: Jaroslav Izavčuk. ISBN 80-86646-12-2
- Spector, Shmuel; Wigoder, Geoffrey (2001). The Encyclopedia of Jewish Life Before and During the Holocaust: Seredina-Buda-Z. New York: NYU Press. ISBN 978-0-8147-9356-5.
