= Sonia Belkind =

First female gynecologist in Ottoman Palestine

Sonia (Alexandra) Belkind
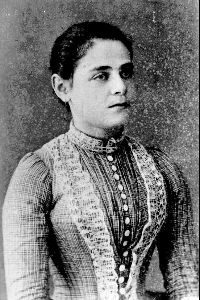
- Sonia Belkind, 1895
- Born: 1870; Lahoysk, Minsk Governorate, Russian Empire (now Belarus)
- Died: 20 September 1943 (aged 72–73); Tel Aviv, Mandatory Palestine
- Occupations: Gynecologist; Physician; Educator
- Known for: First gynecologist in Ottoman Palestine (Land of Israel)
- Spouse: Israel Feinberg
- Family: Israel Belkind (brother); Olga Hankin (sister); Shimshon Belkind (brother); Fania Belkind (sister); Mendel Hankin (partner)

Sonia (Alexandra) Belkind (1870, Lahoysk, Minsk Governorate, Russian Empire (Belarus) – September 20, 1943, Tel Aviv) was the first gynecologist in Ottoman Palestine. She was the younger sister of Israel Belkind, Olga Hankin, Shimshon Belkind, and Fania Belkind, members of the Bilu movement (and wife of Israel Feinberg).

== Biography ==
Belkind immigrated to Ottoman Palestine in 1888 with her parents, Shifra and Meir Belkind, to Rishon LeZion, from which they were expelled to Gedera due to the family's rebellion against the officials of Baron Rothschild. She was a French teacher at the first Hebrew school in Jaffa, established by her brother Israel and her father Meir in 1889.

In 1898, she traveled to Geneva to study medicine, a rare step for a Jewish woman at that time. Upon completing her studies, she returned to Ottoman Palestine as a physician and worked at the Sha'ar Zion Hospital in Jaffa. In 1905, she traveled to Paris to specialize in gynecology, becoming the first gynecologist in Ottoman Palestine (Land of Israel).

A 2025 historical study by Shvarts described Belkind as a "pathmaker" in women's healthcare in the Land of Israel between the years of 1905 and 1912. Shvarts's study highlighted Belkind's contributions as one of the early female physicians that was practicing within the region during the late Ottoman period.

Upon her return to Ottoman Palestine in 1907, she served as the physician for the Herzliya Hebrew Gymnasium while continuing her work at the hospital. She was also one of the founders of the Israel Medical Association. On January 11, 1912, she participated in the founding meeting held at the Herzliya Gymnasium to elect the first committee of the Medical Association and was elected as a member of the first committee. The chairman was Dr. Yehuda Leib Pochovsky.

During World War I, she treated the deported residents of Tel Aviv in their various places of exile, as most doctors were deported or drafted. In 1917, she was arrested and sent to trial in Damascus for her involvement in the Nili underground (her nephew Naaman Belkind was among its activists). She was acquitted of the charges and returned to Tel Aviv. Sonia Belkind was also among the women physicians and nurses who worked to maintain health services for the Yishuv once most of the male doctors were drafted. They worked to maintain and develop healthcare services during the times of physician shortages and during times of wartime.

Belkind was the partner of Mendel Hankin, the brother of Yehoshua Hankin (the partner of Olga, Sonia's sister). The Hankin brothers and their families lived together in a house at 105 Allenby Street, Tel Aviv, built by Sonia. She lived on the upper floor, while Yehoshua and Olga lived on the first floor, and nearby in a smaller apartment lived Dova and her daughter Akhsa Belkind. The house had a large yard with a garden where the first lawn in the Ottoman Palestine was grown.

Belkind was active in public and preventive medicine, promoting women's healthcare. She was a member of the management at the "Shalva" convalescent home founded by her sister Olga Hankin in 1938 for patients with limited means. She opened a private clinic in Tel Aviv, where she treated Jews and Arabs, Christians, and Muslims, and was elected an honorary member of the Israel Medical Association.

Before her death, she bequeathed a sum of money for two purposes: establishing a rest home for elderly doctors in Rishon LeZion and completing the construction of the "Physicians' House" in Tel Aviv.

After her death, she was buried in the Old Cemetery in Rishon LeZion.

The "Physicians' House in Memory of Dr. Alexandra Belkind" in Rishon LeZion was inaugurated twenty years after her death, in 1963.

== See also ==
- Bat Sheva Yonis-Guttman
