= Felkin =

Felkin is a surname. Notable people with the surname include:

- Hugh Felkin (1922–2001), research chemist
- Robert William Felkin (1853–1926), medical missionary and explorer
- Mrs. Felkin, pen name of Ellen Thorneycroft Fowler (1860–1929), English author

== See also ==
- Belkin (surname)
