= Yosef Lishansky =

Israeli spy and martyr (1890–1917)

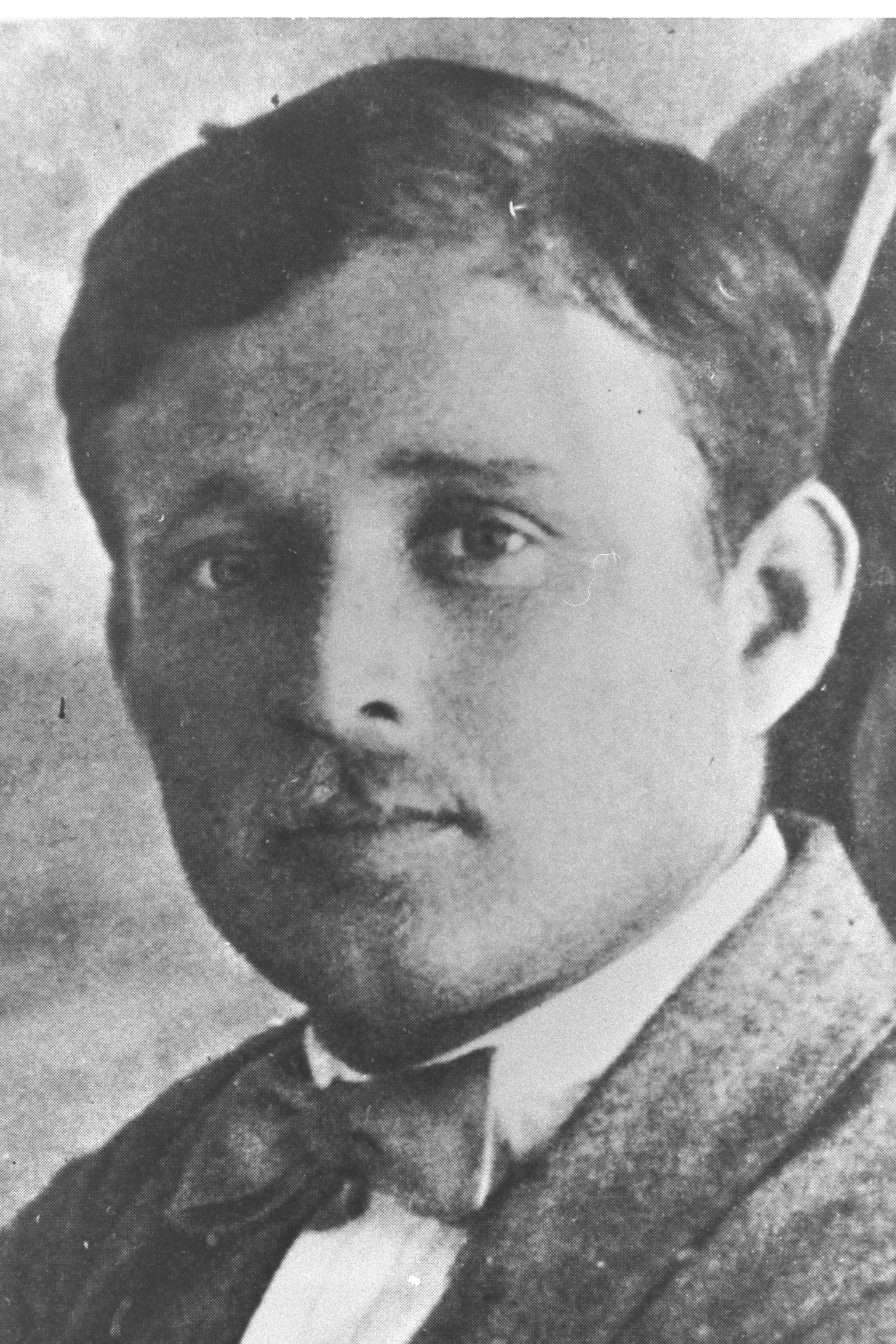
- Yosef Lishansky in the 1910s
- Born: 1890; Kiev Governorate, Russian Empire
- Died: 16 December 1917 (aged 26–27); Damascus, Ottoman Syria, Ottoman Empire
- Cause of death: Execution by hanging
- Resting place: Mount Herzl
- Education: Incomplete seminar studies
- Occupation: Farm manager
- Known for: • Founder of the Jewish Magen defense organization • Executed for Nili group espionage during World War I
- Spouse: Rivka Broshkovsky
- Children: Ivriya (daughter) and Toviah (son)
- Parent(s): Eidel and Ya'akov Toviah

Yosef Lishansky (Hebrew: יוסף לישנסקי; 1890 – 16 December 1917) was a Jewish spy for the British in Ottoman Palestine. Upon making Aliyah, Lishansky sought to join HaShomer but, denied membership, he founded a rival organization, HaMagen. Several years later, he joined the Jewish espionage organization, Nili.

Lishansky was wanted by the Ottomans for his activities and was betrayed by HaShomer when he sought refuge with them. He escaped capture several times, but was eventually caught and sentenced to death in Damascus.

== Life ==
=== Early life ===
Yosef Lishansky was born to Edel (Adina) and Yaakov Tuvia in a town in the Kyiv Governorate in the southwest of the Russian Empire (Ukraine). When he was still young, his mother and almost all his siblings perished in a fire. Yosef immigrated with his father to Land of Israel, probably in 1896.

In Israel, they lived at the home of Israel Lishansky, Yaakov's brother, in Metula. One day, Yosef's father traveled to Jerusalem and never returned, and his fate remains unknown. Yosef continued to live with his uncle's family.

Lishansky excelled in studies and was sent to study at a seminary in Jerusalem, but his studies were interrupted after about two years due to lack of funding. He traveled to Egypt, where he managed a farm. After two years, he returned to Israel. In 1910 he married Rivka Broshkovsky, the daughter of farmers from the moshava Beit Gan. The couple had a daughter and a son.

=== HaShomer ===
Lishansky engaged in private security work, and in 1912 he tried to join the HaShomer organization. The organization required candidates to go through a probationary period before deciding whether to accept or reject them. He was assigned to guard in Rishon LeZion, then in Ben Shemen, and finally in Menachamiya.

When Arabs attacked Menachamiya in February 1915, the guards shot and killed the leader of the rioters. The policy of HaShomer was to avoid killing Arabs as much as possible to prevent getting entangled in a blood feud, and Lishansky was accused of killing the rioter without sufficient justification (as far as can be determined, it was an unjust accusation; eyewitnesses said the shooter was another guard). He was hidden in a safe place for a short time, fearing blood revenge. Following the incident, his acceptance into HaShomer was denied, even though he excelled in guarding and was known as an excellent horseman.

This story was only the pretext for his rejection; in reality, the rejection stemmed from significant differences in views between him and the members and leaders of HaShomer, who were part of the Second Aliyah and influenced by socialist ideals, feeling they represented the working class in Russia. Lishansky did not hold such ideologies. Additionally, he disagreed with HaShomer's policy of only targeting the actual Arab rioters and not the villagers.

Personal issues also worked against him. Israel Shochat, a founder of HaShomer, later wrote:

"For a very long period, Yosef Lishansky was a candidate for membership in HaShomer. He was a good guard, knew how to use weapons; he was familiar with the customs of the area and Arabic – yet he was not accepted as a member of HaShomer and was even removed from guarding duties because he displayed weakness of character, a tendency for adventurism, and arrogance."

=== HaMagen ===
After leaving HaShomer, Lishansky met with a group of guards, some rejected by HaShomer, in the moshava Kinneret, and it was decided to establish a competing guard organization called HaMagen. Since they did not want to compete with HaShomer, which was mainly operating in the Galilee at that time, they decided to turn to the southern settlements and take over the guarding from the Arabs who were guarding them. Lishansky, chosen as the leader of the organization, was sent to negotiate with the southern settlements to gain guarding contracts. HaMagen was entrusted with guarding in several places, including Ruhama, Be'er Tuvia, and Ekron. After a few months, they also secured guarding in Gedera. Despite a specific clause in HaMagen's regulations that it would not provide guarding where HaShomer had previously operated (even if HaShomer had left the area long ago), HaShomer exerted pressure to disband HaMagen. HaShomer failed in its efforts, and HaMagen continued to exist. Lishansky was busy organizing guarding and its operations until he left for Egypt on behalf of Nili in January 1917. When he left, he did not inform the members of HaMagen about his affiliation with Nili, and his disappearance aroused suspicion and complaints against him. After returning to the country in February, he redirected his efforts to Nili's espionage activities (see below) and even recruited members of HaMagen to Nili. His involvement in HaMagen almost ceased, leading to the disbandment of HaMagen, and its members went their separate ways. At its peak, it had about twenty guards, some permanent and others substitutes.

=== Nili ===
Lishansky joined Nili at its early stages when the espionage organization needed an operative in the Negev. This was when Avshalom Feinberg was arrested on suspicion of espionage in December 1915. Feinberg was held in prison in Beersheba, and to maintain contact with him, Nili members used Lishansky, among others, to pass notes smuggled out of the prison to the Aharonson Family in Atlit.

In 1916 there was almost no activity in Nili, except for attempts by its founders to establish contact with the British, so Lishansky continued to invest his main efforts in HaMagen's activities and did not carry out tasks for Nili.

In early 1917 Avshalom Feinberg decided to travel to Egypt to renew contact with the British, which had been cut off. He set out with Lishansky, who lived in the south and was familiar with the Negev and the desert. During their journey on 20 January, they were attacked by Bedouins. Feinberg was killed, and Lishansky was wounded and later picked up by an Australian patrol of the British army. He was transferred to a hotel in Port Said and later taken to a hospital in Cairo. Five days after the encounter, Aharon Aharonson, who was in Egypt, learned that Lishansky was wounded in Port Said. He met and spoke with him, learning of Feinberg's death. This was the only testimony about what happened in the desert, which later raised suspicion that Lishansky himself killed Feinberg and fabricated the Bedouin attack story. At the beginning of their acquaintance, there was hesitation from Aharon Aharonson towards Lishansky. The two had different personalities due to different social backgrounds: Aharon was the son of farmers, while Yosef was from the labor camp, and although he was not accepted into HaShomer, he absorbed much from the association's atmosphere. These differences created clashes and sometimes quarrels between them. There were even rumors that Lishansky murdered Feinberg over a rivalry for the affection of Sarah Aharonson. After the Six-Day War, Shlomo Ben Elkana discovered the location of Feinberg's grave and investigated the elderly Bedouins in the area. They testified that he was murdered, completely disproving the suspicion against Lishansky. Thorough research indicates that Lishansky likely met Sarah Aharonson only once, briefly, before the journey to Egypt, ruling out any romantic connection between them.

In February, after fully recovering from his wounds, Lishansky returned to Atlit aboard the British ship "Mengan".

From that time he became the coordinator of Nili's activities in the country, alongside Sarah Aharonson. His experience managing HaMagen and his deep familiarity with the country helped him maintain continuous contact with the operatives. Sometimes he stayed in Atlit, Nili's "base," and at other times, he traveled around the country between the various agents, collecting reports. He copied the reports received from the agents in his handwriting and sent them to Egypt using the British connection ship. He also managed and supervised the transfer of funds from Egypt.

In April 1917 he traveled to Egypt on his own initiative aboard the British connection ship. This caused friction with Aharon Aharonson, the leader of Nili, who commanded it from Egypt. Among other things, Lishansky was sent to find the remains of Avshalom Feinberg, and he returned, saying he found the location, but one of the armies built fortifications and railway tracks there, making it impossible to retrieve the remains. In Egypt, Lishansky was also trained in sabotage, with the goal of blowing up bridges in the country. The idea was eventually shelved to avoid endangering the espionage work. In June, after hesitation, he returned to the country and continued coordinating Nili's activities.

In early September 1917 the Ottomans intercepted a carrier pigeon carrying an encrypted message, confirming their suspicion that spies were among the Jews of the country. Nili debated whether to continue the espionage work or wait until the danger passed. Lishansky, along with Sarah Aharonson, supported continuing the work, and the decision was made accordingly.

Another suspicion arose when British sterling coins were found in the Ramla market. These coins were part of the financial support sent to Lishansky's family, and their housemaid used them as payment in the market without the family's knowledge. Because the Ottomans were at war with Britain, using its currency was forbidden. The discovery of the coins by the police, although they did not know who used them, strengthened the suspicion of espionage in favor of Britain.

In October, when the Turks uncovered the network, Zikhron Yaakov was surrounded. Nili members learned of the Turks' arrival beforehand, and Lishansky managed to escape, carrying a pistol, some money, a loaf of bread, and a little water. For twenty days, he wandered through the land, reaching as far north as Metula and as far south as Rishon LeZion before being captured. During the chase, Lishansky fell into the hands of HaShomer members, who were his former colleagues and rivals. After hesitation, the HaShomer committee decided to execute him and hand his body over to the Turks. They shot him, but he escaped wounded. He was captured again by Arabs from whom he tried to steal a camel and was handed over to the Turks.

== Captivity and execution ==
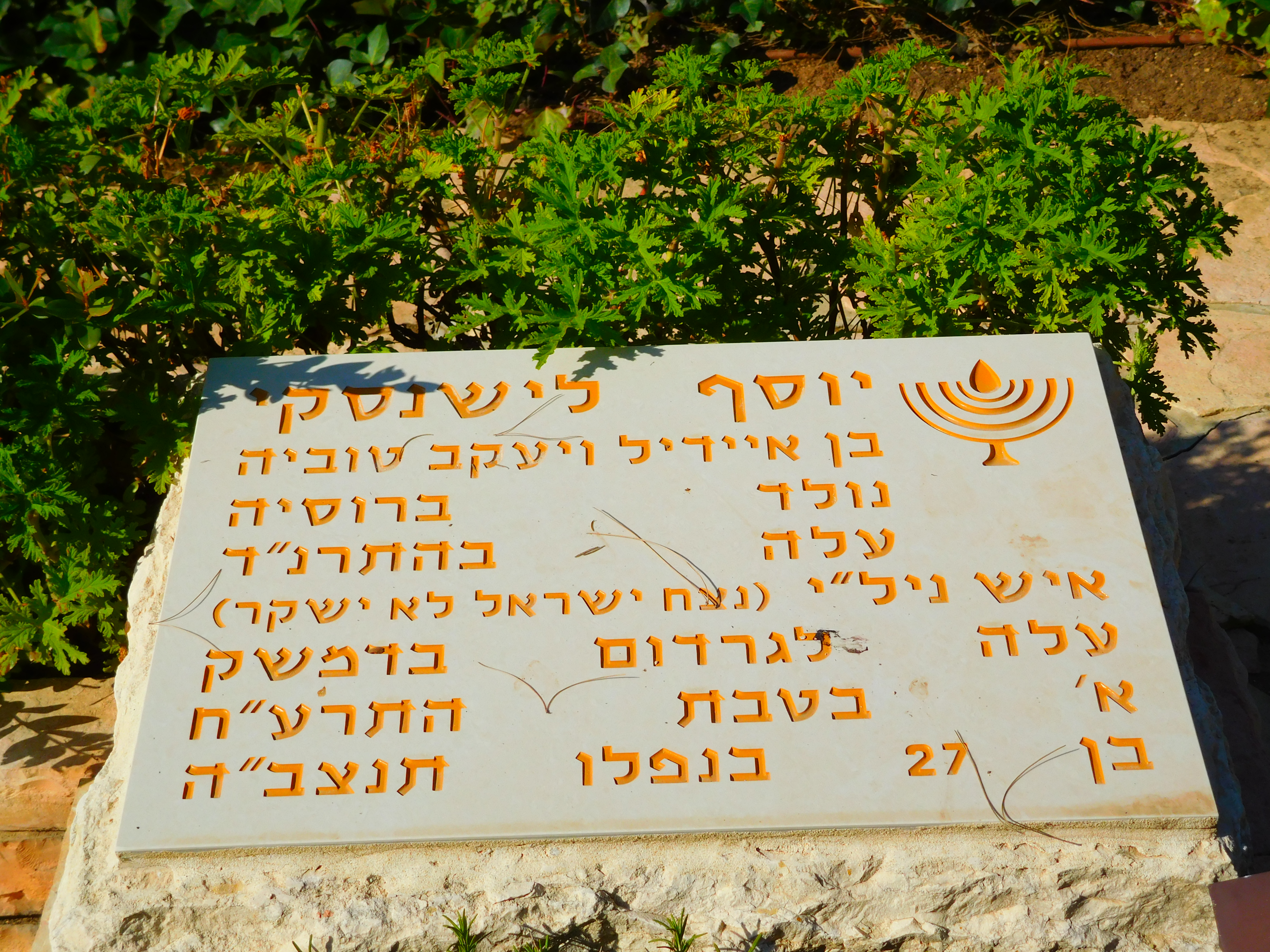
Yosef Lishansky's grave on Mount Herzl

After being captured, Lishansky was transferred to Jerusalem and then taken to a prison in Damascus. It is unclear whether, during his interrogation, he disclosed much information, remained silent, or opened up. There are conflicting testimonies. According to Dr. Moshe Naiman, who was with Lishansky in prison and spoke with him,

"…about the organization (HaShomer), he said it was a secret society dangerous to the homeland. Every member has a specific role, and no one knows about another’s role. They are preparing for a rebellion and have much weaponry and explosives for this purpose."

Another testimony was given by Eitan Belkind, who heard from Lishansky that

"…he did not inform on anyone during the interrogations... not even on HaShomer members. Out of a desire to take revenge on them, he only said that he himself was a member of HaShomer."

It is difficult to determine whether Lishansky indeed informed on HaShomer members or not. Regarding the issue of smuggling funds to the Land of Israel during the war famine, Lishansky refused to testify, thereby saving several Hebrew activists involved in it. Nevertheless, when the Jewish community leaders tried to assist the prisoners – many of whom had no connection to espionage – they refrained from aiding Lishansky out of a sense of vengeance and hatred.

In the trial held for him in the prison Lishansky was sentenced to death by hanging. He sought to escape from his cell through bribery, but Meir Dizengoff refused to transfer the necessary money, despite having received large sums from Nili and despite Lishansky's refusal to testify saving him from punishment.

Lishansky and Naaman Belkind spent their final days in depression. On one occasion, Lishansky asked Dr. Moshe Naiman, a fellow Nili member imprisoned with him, for poison to take his own life. But Naiman did not fulfill his request.

At three in the morning on 16 December 1917, Yosef Lishansky and Naaman Belkind were taken from their cells to the central square in Damascus, to the gallows. Eitan Belkind recounted:

"Even though the cells were locked and the prisoners were confined, there was much excitement in the khan. Suddenly Yosef’s cry rang out: 'Farewell, Jews! I am going to die!' The Turkish officer accompanying Lishansky calmed him, saying he was being taken to Aleppo. Lishansky scolded him: 'Are you still mocking me! Do you take me for a woman?' Naaman staggered in his walk ... As they parted, they turned to me, and together they cried: 'Nili!', I responded to them: 'The eternity of Israel will not forget you.' Only then did I break into tears."

At the central square, Lishansky delivered an anti-Ottoman speech in Arabic to the Arab audience. Dibsheh Erlich, an eyewitness, reported his words:

"We are not traitors; we did not betray our homeland, for betrayal must be preceded by love. We have never loved the homeland of the 'falaka' (torture) and the 'baksheesh' (bribes) ... We hated it with absolute hatred... We, the members of Nili, led by the great Jew [referring to Aaron Aharonson], dug a large grave for you, despicable Ottoman Empire!.. While you are busy hanging us, the British army is entering our holy city, Jerusalem, and your armies are fleeing the city without a fight [the British captured Jerusalem a few days earlier, on December 9]."

When his speech was translated into Turkish, the executioner understood its tone and ordered the translation to cease. Belkind and Lishansky spoke and recited the Viddui (confession) before their death with the envoy of the Hakham Bashi of Damascus, Hakham Nataniel HaCohen Trab Masalton, who was a Hebrew teacher at the city’s "Alliance" school.

Afterward, Lishansky and Belkind were hanged. Their bodies were taken down at nine in the morning and transferred to their graves.

In 1919 Shimshon Belkind and Eitan Belkind, Naaman's father and brother, came to Damascus and transferred their remains to the cemetery in Rishon LeZion. Less than twenty people attended the funeral, held on Tishrei 30, 5680; it was less than two years after Nili's capture, and the Yishuv in the country boycotted its members. The anger against him even led to his grave in Rishon LeZion being desecrated several times.

Lishansky left behind two children: Tuvia and Avriya.

In August 1979, as part of the public struggle to rehabilitate his name, his remains were transferred in a state military ceremony to the Plot of the Ascenders of the Gallows on Mount Herzl near the grave of Avshalom Feinberg.

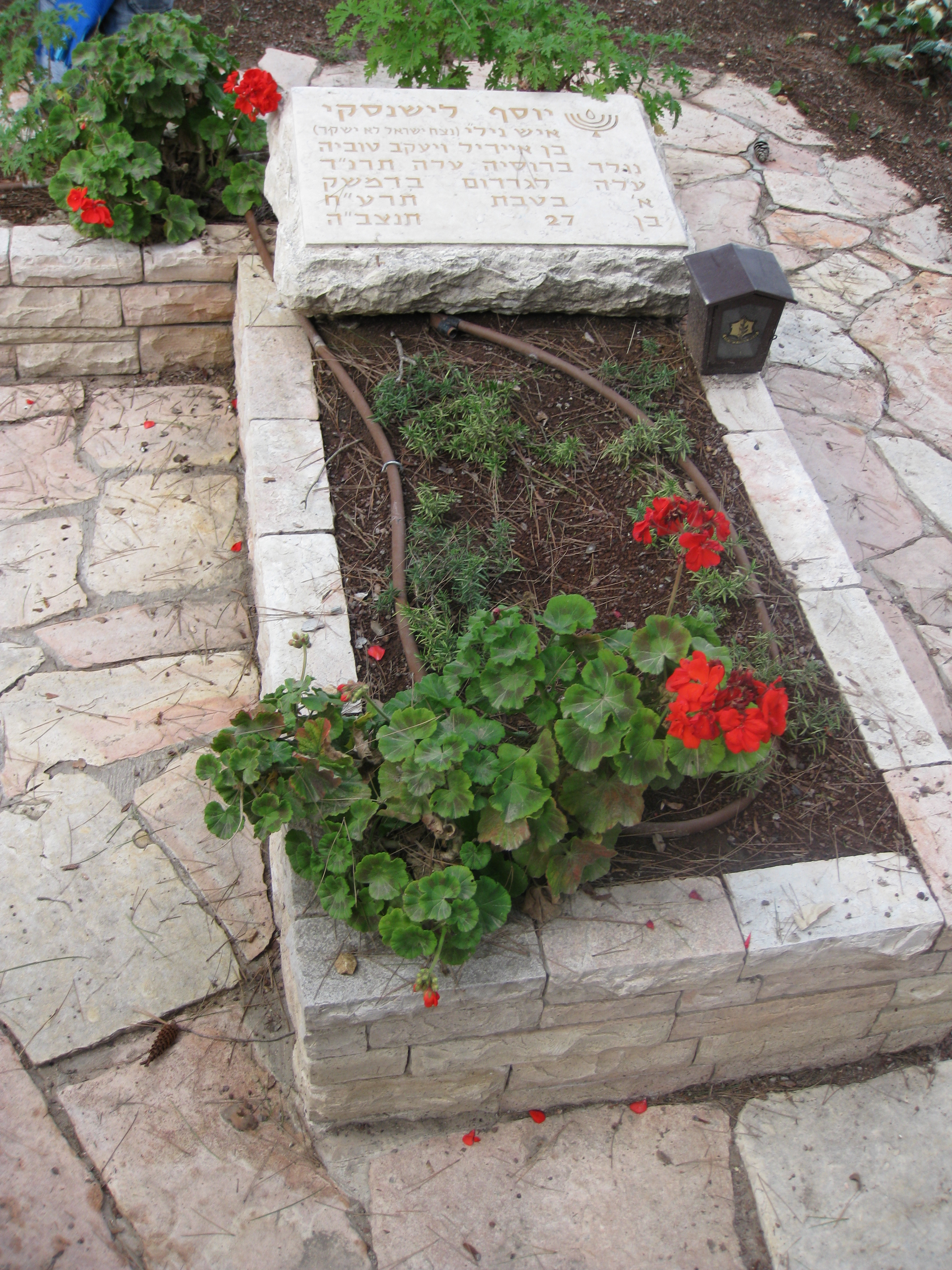
Tomb of Yosef Lishansky

== His character ==
During his life and in the period immediately following his death, Lishansky's character was highly controversial. There are conflicting testimonies from that time about his personality: some present him in a negative light, while others depict him positively. He was described as an adventurer and an exceptional rider, and it was said that the Arabs he interacted with respected and feared him. The controversy over his character was closely linked to the divisions within the Jewish Yishuv in the Land of Israel at that time and the disputes between the "HaShomer" and "HaMagen" guard organizations.

Moshe Setoy, a member of HaMagen, said:

"Yosef Lishansky was loved and admired by all of us... He had a poetic soul; he wrote Hebrew poems, and even if they were immature poems, they showed his inclination toward poetry. He made a great impression on us... There was something adventurous about Yosef (...) he had a turbulent character, but he possessed many virtues, was familiar with the environment and the Arabs, rode well, and was courageous."

On the other hand he was accused of arrogance and unnecessary adventurism.

The hatred towards him at that time was so intense that Jeremiah Yafeh, the son of Hillel Yaffe, recounted:

"On that bitter day when Zikhron was surrounded... I was in the synagogue when all the Torah scrolls were taken out of the ark, black-wrapped candles were lit in the middle of the day, the shofar was blown, and a curse was pronounced against Yosef Lishansky... and these were not just words said to placate the Turks. Most of the congregation accepted them as said, for one does not blow shofars and swear falsely before Torah scrolls." (From Haaretz, June 8, 1944)

Over the years, Yosef Lishansky's public image underwent a fundamental change. Initially, he was considered a negative figure by the general public. In the play "Guardians" by Ever Hadani, performed by Habima Theatre in 1937, facts were distorted to present Lishansky negatively. The play was canceled after his widow Rivka protested. About the play, his daughter Avriya wrote:

"...[Did the members of HaShomer] have a hidden intent to distort the truth to cover up the burden of conscience weighing upon them for falsely accusing a man for whom no one has yet appeared to defend?"

Even many years later Lishansky's story and the attempt by HaShomer to execute him remained sensitive issues. In 1962, Kol Yisrael prepared a radio drama called "Chase," but it was banned from broadcasting by the Prime Minister's Office, likely due to concerns about reviving a painful issue involving people close to the government (including Rachel Yanait Ben-Zvi, wife of Yitzhak Ben-Zvi, the president). Only three years later, in November 1965, was it allowed to be broadcast following public pressure.

After the Six-Day War, when Avshalom Feinberg's death site was discovered, Lishansky's name was fully cleared of the murder accusations. His widow and children approached Prime Minister of Israel, Levi Eshkol, requesting that their father's remains be transferred to Mount Herzl. Eshkol replied that he did not consider it a matter for the Israeli government. Later, the "Public Committee for the Rehabilitation of Yosef Lishansky" was established, led by Yosef Nedava, with members including Uri Zvi Greenberg, Rehavam Ze'evi, and Shlomo Ben Elkanah. Months after the political upheaval in Israel and as a result of it, the committee began a public campaign, which eventually led to Lishansky's remains being transferred to Mount Herzl in a state military ceremony with official representatives of the State of Israel.

In 1997 the book "Chase" by Ephraim Rahman was published, describing Lishansky's twenty-day escape from the Turks and his execution. The book aims to portray Lishansky's character objectively. It appears that the debate over his character, like the debate over the entire Nili network, has been resolved, and today he is no longer viewed as a negative figure but as someone who tried to do good to the best of his understanding.

== Commemoration ==
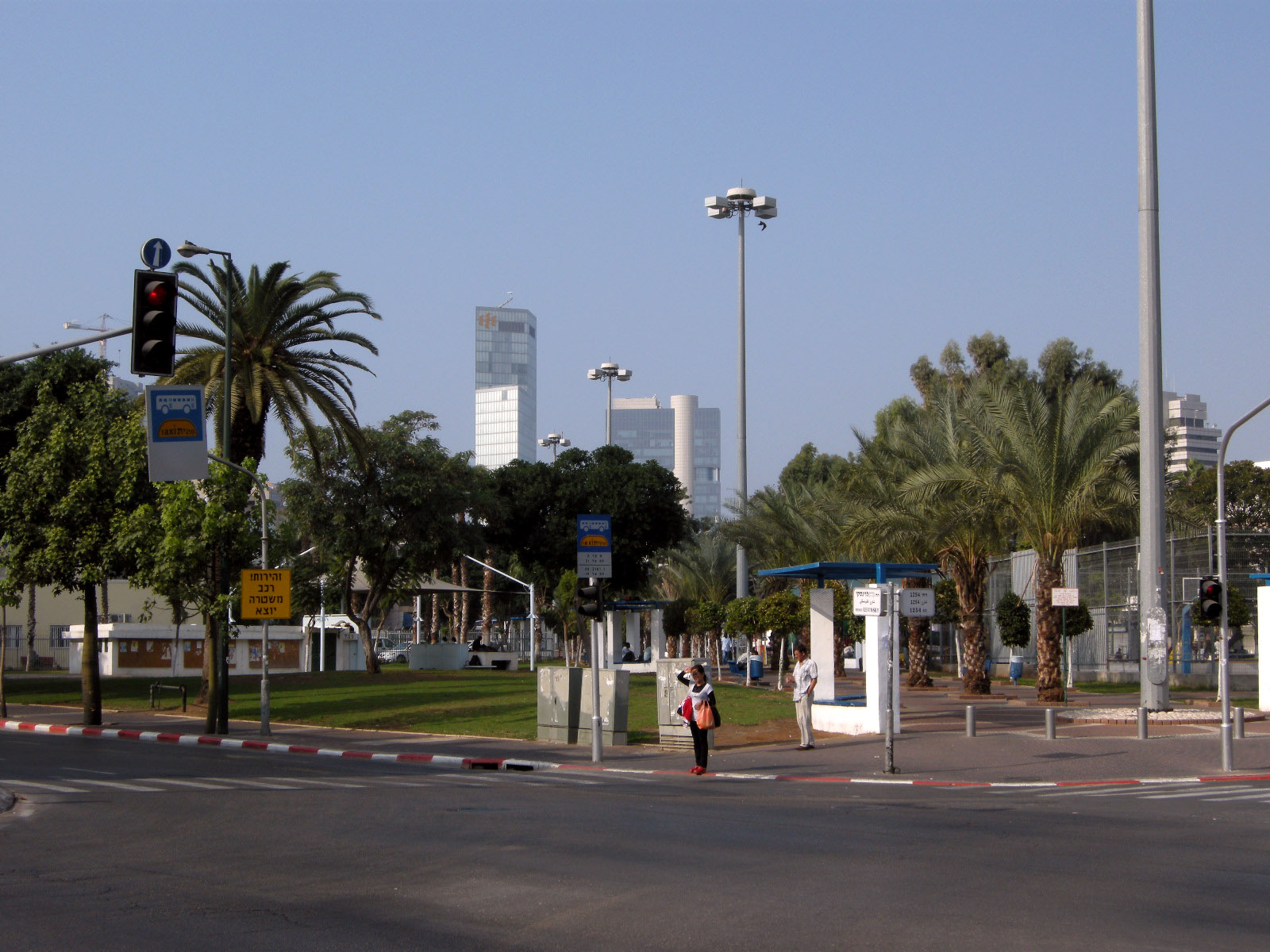
Park near Central Bus Station in Tel Aviv. The street sign points to Yosef Lishansky Street

On 22 December 1982 Israel Post issued a commemorative sheet of 20 stamps titled "Gallows Martyrs of the Rebirth Generation." One of these stamps was dedicated to commemorating Lishansky, with his portrait depicted on it. The artist Ruth Beckmann Malka designed the portrait, and the artist Aryeh Glazer designed the sheet.
