= Bat Sheva Yonis-Guttman =

Israeli physician

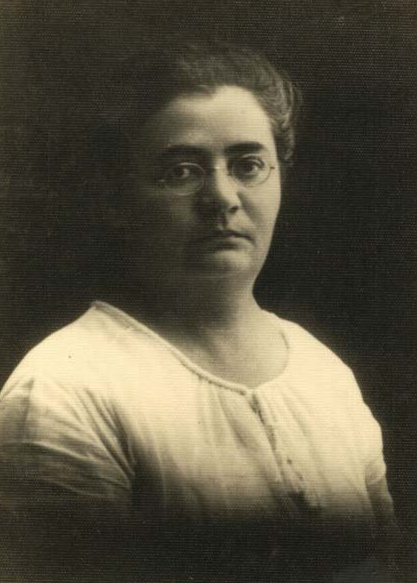
- Yonis-Guttman in 1913
- Born: January 1, 1880; Romania
- Died: July 9, 1947 (aged 67); Tel Aviv, Mandatory Palestine
- Burial place: Trumpeldor Cemetery
- Medical career
- Field: Gynecology

Bat Sheva Yonis-Guttman (January 1, 1880 – July 9, 1947) was a physician in Mandatory Palestine in what is now Israel. She was one of the first doctors, and the first female doctor in what is now Israel, and the first doctor in Gedera and Tel Aviv.

Bat Sheva Yonis-Guttman was a pioneer in the field of infant care and medicine in the Land of Israel. She was one of the founders of the Hebrew Medical Association, later the Israel Medical Association. She established the first milk drop station in Tel Aviv.

== See also ==
- Sonia Belkind
