= Bayle =

Bayle is a position in medieval Occitania and Spain similar to that of a bailiff. It can also refer to:

== Surname ==
- Antoine Laurent Bayle (1799–1858), a French physician
- François Bayle (born 1932), a French composer of acousmatic music
- George A. Bayle Jr., first to market peanut butter
- Jean-Michel Bayle (born 1969), a French motorcycle racer
- Pierre Bayle (1647–1706), a philosopher

== Place name ==
- Pic Bayle in the French Alps
- Bayle Mountain in New Hampshire, United States
- Bayle Museum in Bridlington, East Yorkshire

== See also ==
- Bale (disambiguation)
- Beyle (disambiguation)
