= Al-Jammama =

al-Jammama الجمامه al-Jamama
- Village
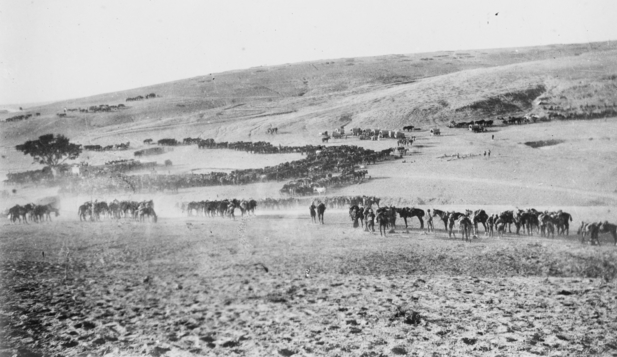
- Horses at Jemmameh during WWI
- Etymology: Kh. Jemmâmeh, "the ruin of abundance, or of reservoirs"
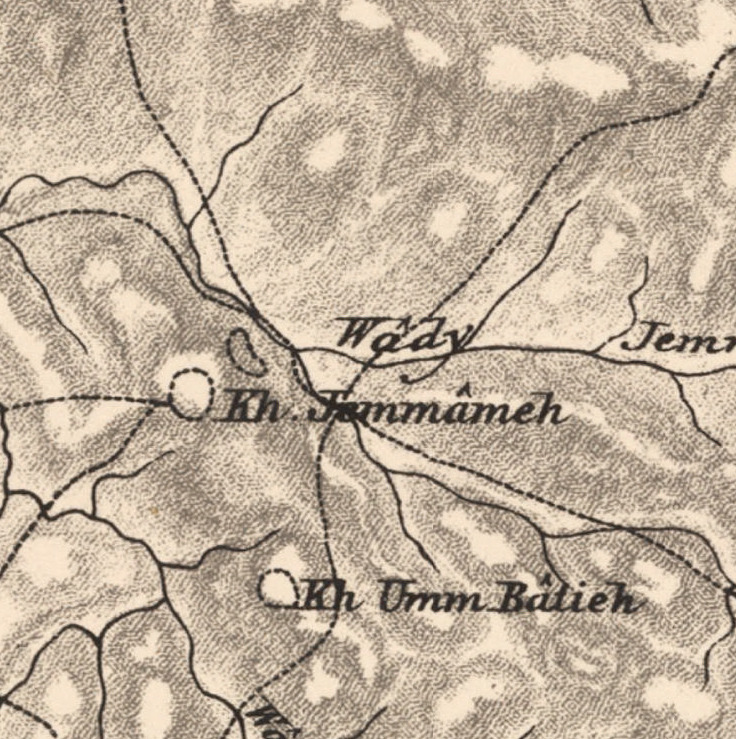
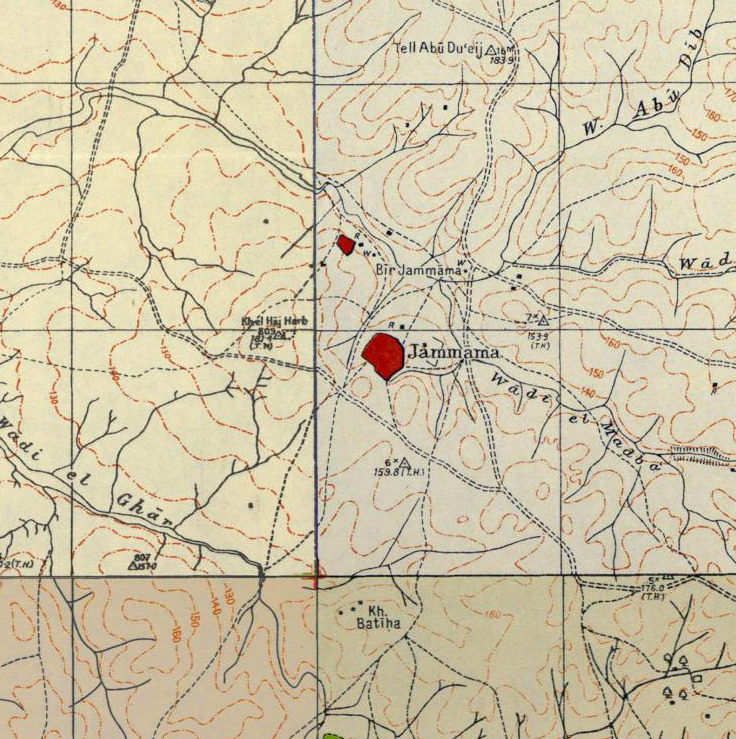
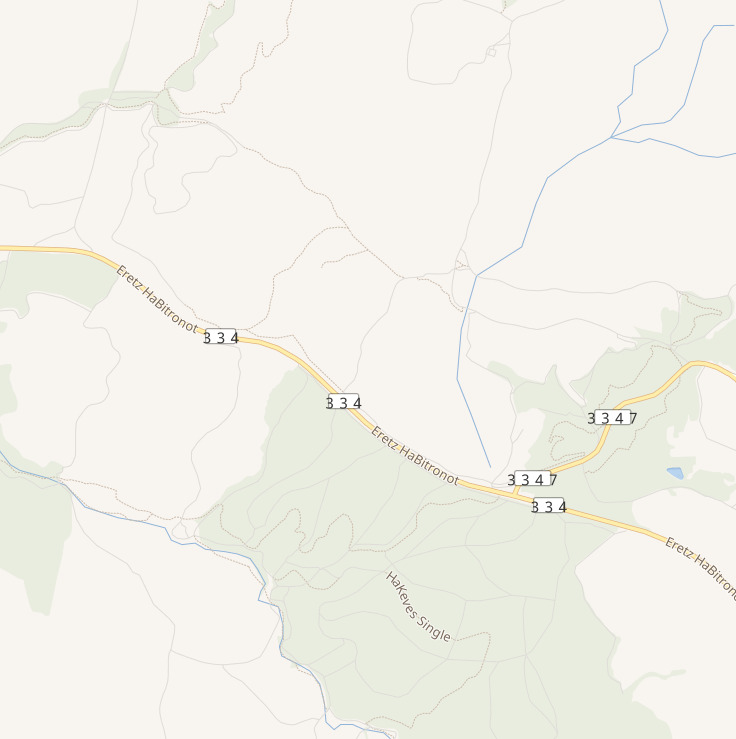
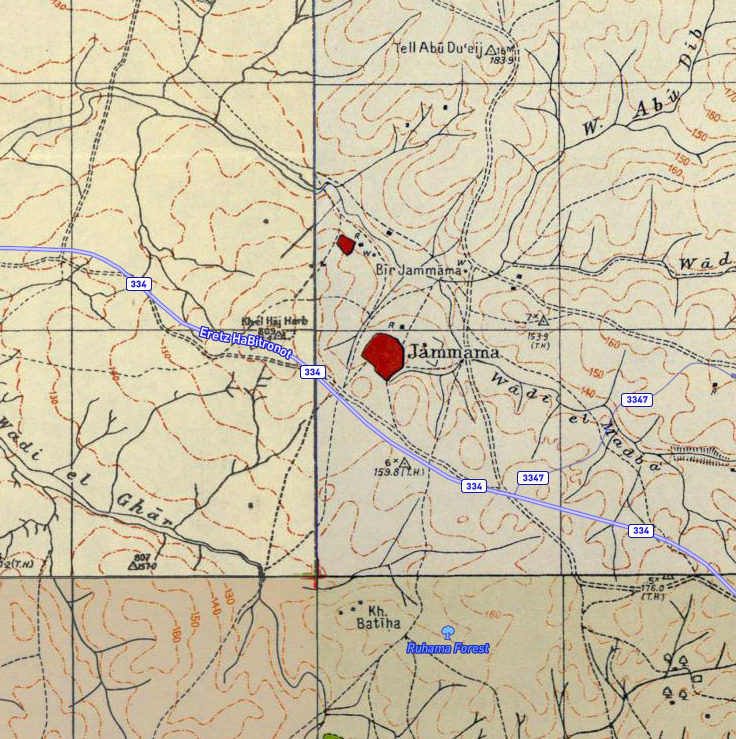
- 1870s map 1940s map modern map 1940s with modern overlay map A series of historical maps of the area around Al-Jammama (click the buttons)

- Location within Mandatory Palestine
- Coordinates: 31°29′55″N 34°41′10″E
- Palestine grid: 120/100
- Geopolitical entity: Mandatory Palestine
- Subdistrict: Beersheba
- Date of depopulation: May 22, 1948

Population (1931)
  - Total: 6 (not including Bedouin inhabitants)
- Cause(s) of depopulation: Military assault by Yishuv forces
- Current Localities: Ruhama

Al-Jammama (Arabic: الجمامه) was a Palestinian Arab village located in the Negev desert 30 km north west of the city of Beersheba. Its settled population was recorded as six in the 1931 census.

== History ==
The village was an archeological site, containing cisterns, an olive press, mosaic floors, tombs, the crown of a stone column, and stone tools from the Middle Paleolithic period have been found in the vicinity.

An invocation text, May Allah have mercy on you, Amr b. Sahl al Jahmi, dating from early 2nd century A.H./ 9th century C.E., was found by the remnants of an ancient bath in Al-Jammama. The inscription is presently in Kibbutz Ruhama.

A construction text, for the construction of a cistern or a well, dating to late 5th AH/11th century CE, has also been found at Al-Jammama.

=== Ottoman era ===
In 1863, Victor Guérin described it as an ’inconsiderable’ ruin.

In 1883, the PEF's Survey of Western Palestine (SWP) found at Khurbet Jemmameh: "Remains of a ruined village, about 20 houses. Rubble cisterns. A spring well, dry in summer. An olive press and a piece of tesselated pavement."

=== British Mandate era ===
At the end of World War I, on 8 November 1917, the British defeated the Ottoman force in Al-Jammama, which resulted in a British occupation of the village. In the 1931 census it had 6 inhabitants; all Muslim, in 1 house.

Al-Jammama had an elementary school, which was founded in 1944. The kibbutz of Ruhama was also established in 1944 on the village's land.

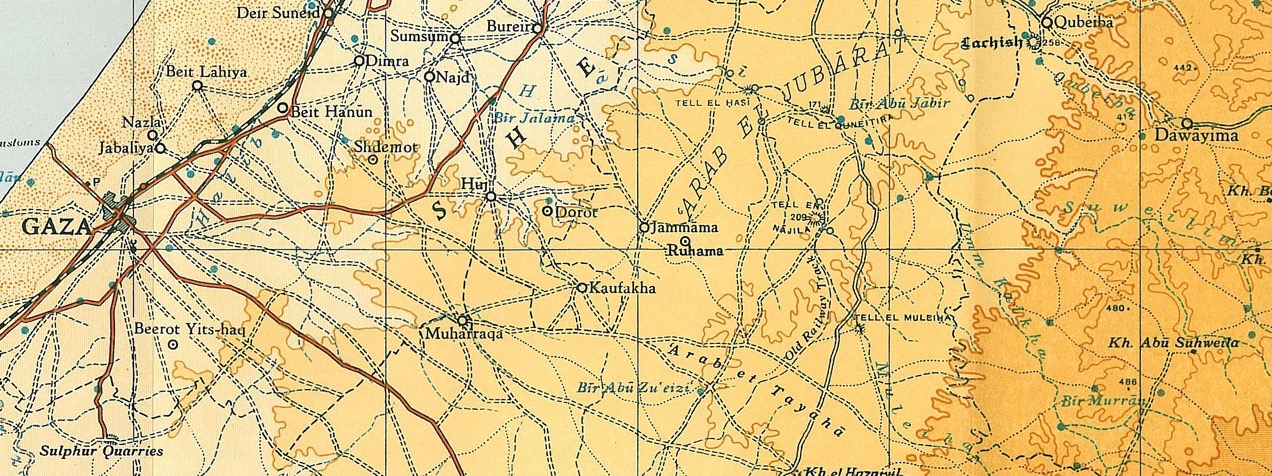
al Jammama 1945 1:250,000

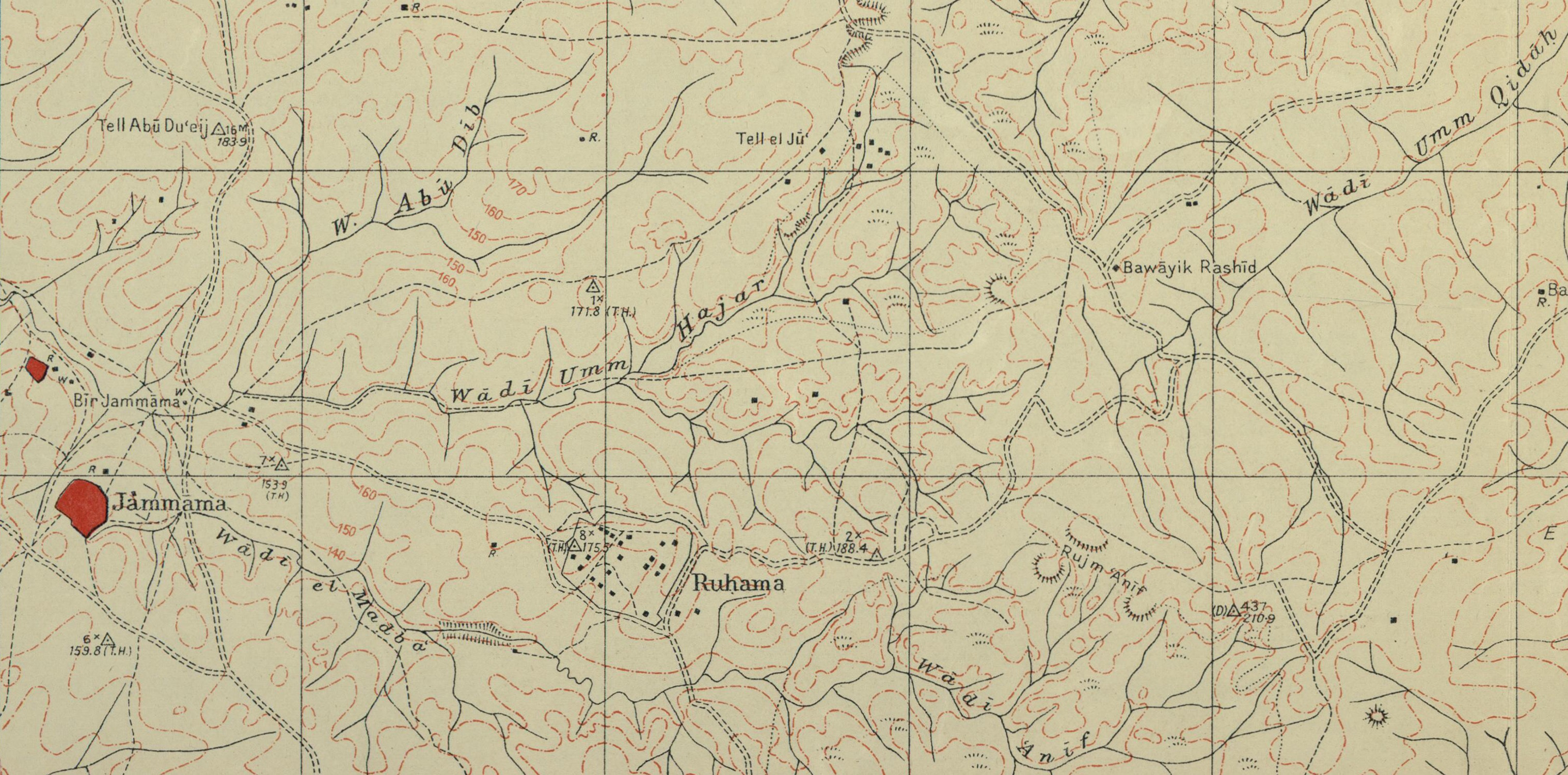
al Jammama 1947 1:20,000

=== Israel ===
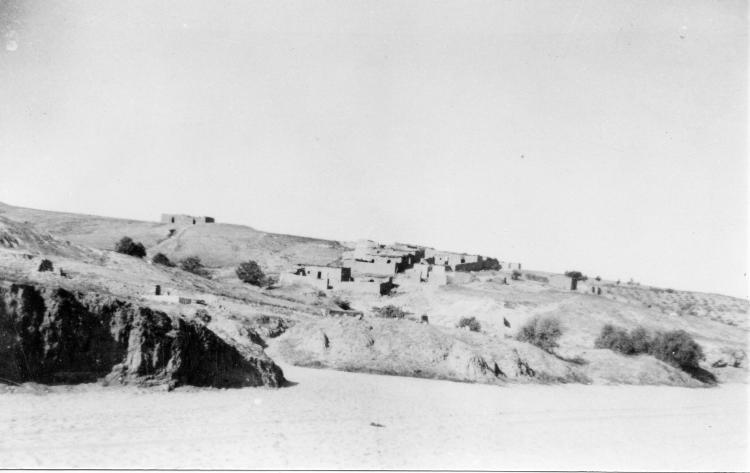
Jammama. 1948

During the 1948 Arab–Israeli War it was captured by Israel's Negev and Givati brigades on May 22, 1948, and its inhabitants were expelled. Following the war the area was incorporated into the State of Israel.

According to the Palestinian historian Walid Khalidi, the remaining structures on the village land were in 1992: "A few walls remain on the slopes of hills, surrounded by shrubs and thorns. Cactuses and gum trees grow on the site. The site is used for animal grazing; it also has a stable for horses. The surrounding lands are used for agriculture. Bedouin still camp near the site occasionally to take advantage of nearby pasture."

== Bibliography ==
- Conder, C.R.; Kitchener, H. H. (1883). The Survey of Western Palestine: Memoirs of the Topography, Orography, Hydrography, and Archaeology. Vol. 3. London: Committee of the Palestine Exploration Fund.
- Guérin, V. (1869). Description Géographique Historique et Archéologique de la Palestine (in French). Vol. 1: Judee, pt. 2. Paris: L'Imprimerie Nationale.
- Khalidi, W. (1992). All That Remains: The Palestinian Villages Occupied and Depopulated by Israel in 1948. Washington D.C.: Institute for Palestine Studies. ISBN 0-88728-224-5.
- Mills, E., ed. (1932). Census of Palestine 1931. Population of Villages, Towns and Administrative Areas. Jerusalem: Government of Palestine.
- Morris, B. (2004). The Birth of the Palestinian Refugee Problem Revisited. Cambridge University Press. ISBN 978-0-521-00967-6.
- Palmer, E. H. (1881). The Survey of Western Palestine: Arabic and English Name Lists Collected During the Survey by Lieutenants Conder and Kitchener, R. E. Transliterated and Explained by E.H. Palmer. Committee of the Palestine Exploration Fund.
- Sharon, M. (2016). Corpus Inscriptionum Arabicarum Palaestinae, J (I). Vol. 6. BRILL. ISBN 978-90-04-32479-4.
