= HaMagen (defense organization) =

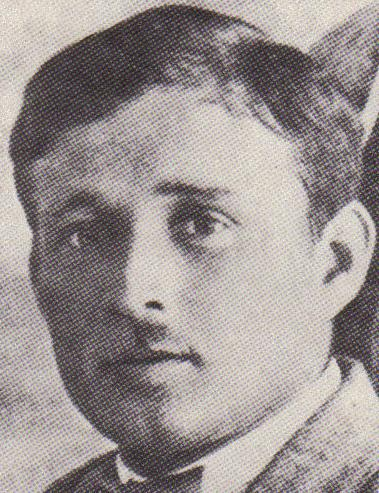
Yosef Lishansky

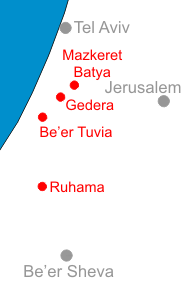
Villages guarded by HaMagen

HaMagen (Hebrew: המגן, lit. The Shield), was a Jewish defense organization in Ottoman Palestine, founded by Yosef Lishansky in summer 1915. It guarded villages in the northern Negev and disbanded in summer 1917, following Lishansky's departure to Nili.

== Background and founding ==
At the time of HaMagen's founding, HaShomer was the only all-Jewish defense organization in Ottoman Palestine. Due to the high price, the elitist and idealistic policies of HaShomer, most Jewish towns and villages were guarded by Arabs. An attempt was made in 1912 to create a rival organization, HaNoter, but it lasted only one year.

HaMagen was created in summer 1915, and Yosef Lishansky, who was rejected from HaShomer, became its leader. According to HaMagen's David Tsalevich, some of the organization's members were disgruntled HaShomer would-be inductees, who were not accepted despite extensive trial periods. Ben-Zion Mashevich and David Tsalevich were members of both HaShomer and HaMagen, but denied any connections with the latter.

The organization consisted of about 20 members, including men from Poale Zion. The Judea Workers' Union provided further manpower during the organization's early period.

== Activities ==
After negotiations, HaMagen was selected to guard four southern villages: Ruhama, Gedera, Be'er Tuvia, and Ekron (today Mazkeret Batya).

== Difficulties and decline ==
Although HaMagen was accused of benefitting from the gold transferred from the British to the Nili, the economic situation of most of the guardsmen (except in Ekron) was dire. They usually guarded barefoot and passed around a single pair of shoes when it was required. Food was provided by the local farmers, who took the Magen members in turn for a month each.

HaShomer, the well-established Jewish defense organization at the time, did not attempt to shut down HaMagen when it was founded, because they did not work in the same areas. However, tensions rose when HaShomer failed to take over the guarding of Gedera from HaMagen in 1916. As soon as HaShomer returned to operate in the southern town Rehovot, they officially asked the Judea Workers' Union to boycott HaMagen. The request was presided over by Levi Eshkol and Avraham Herzfeld, and denied on the grounds that HaMagen's own regulations forbade competition with HaShomer.

After Lishansky joined Nili, he was forced to neglect HaMagen, until finally rumors of his involvement in Nili caused the organization to disband. The Judea Workers' Union's later stance towards the organization contributed to its decline—the union did not boycott HaMagen, but discontinued supporting it with manpower, and following HaShomer's appeals, agreed not to help HaMagen acquire guarding positions in more villages.

== Bibliography ==
- Goldstein, Jacob (1998). From Fighters to Soldiers. Sussex Academic Press. ISBN 1-902210-01-8.
- Ben-Yehuda, Nachman (1993). Political Assassinations by Jews. SUNY Press. ISBN 0-7914-1165-6.
