= Olga Hankin =

Russian-Jewish activist and midwife (1852–1942)

- אוֹלְגָּה חַנְקִין
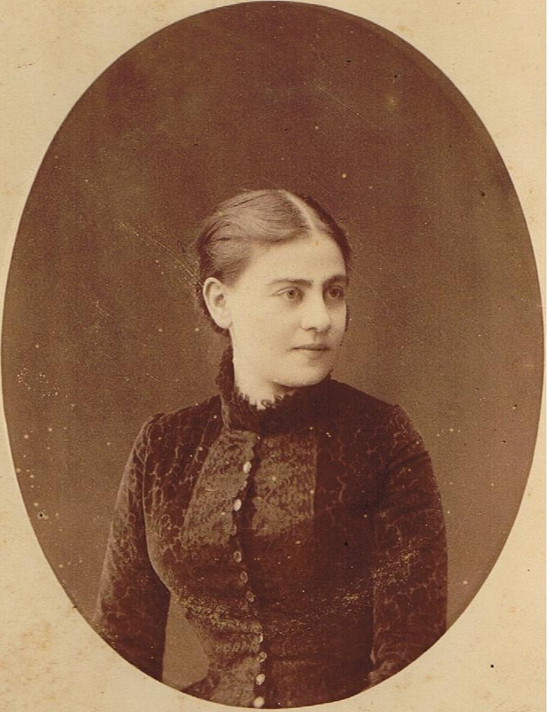
- Olga Hankin in her youth
- Born: Olga Belkind; January 9, 1852; Lahoysk, Minsk Governorate, Russian Empire
- Died: April 2, 1942 (aged 90); Jezreel Valley, Mandatory Palestine
- Occupations: Midwife, Zionist activist
- Known for: Major land purchases for the World Zionist Organization
- Spouse: Yehoshua Hankin

Olga Hankin (or Khankin; Hebrew: אוֹלְגָּה חַנְקִין; 9 January 1852 - 2 April 1942) was a feminist, professional midwife and Zionist activist who, together with her husband, Yehoshua Hankin, was responsible for most of the major land purchases of the Zionist Organization in Ottoman Palestine and Mandatory Palestine. While he became known as a prominent "redeemer of lands" (Hebrew) גואל האדמות she, too, was instrumental in this work.

== Biography ==
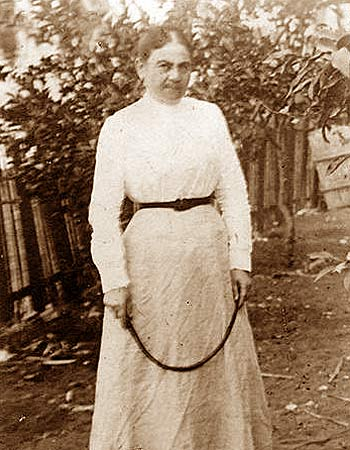
Olga Hankin holding whip with which she kept potential attackers at bay as she made her midwifery rounds

Olga Hankin (née Belkind) was born in the small town of Lahoysk, in Minsk Governorate of the Russian Empire (now Belarus). She was the oldest child of Meir and Shifra Belkind. She moved to St. Petersburg as a young woman and to the Land of Israel as part of the First Aliyah in 1886. Two years later she married Yehoshua Hankin (1864–1945) in the agricultural settlement of Gedera. They moved to Jaffa, where she became known for her midwifery skills, having studied the profession in St. Petersburg; "she was most likely the first professional midwife in the country". She was 13 years older than he and would become his partner in their endeavors. Ironically for a woman who brought many children into the world, her marriage with Yehoshua was childless.

Olga delivered babies. She became well-known among the Arabs of Jaffa—effendis, sheikhs and Bedouin tribal leaders who lived on the sandy stretches south of the city. At the end of the 1880s no one yet believed in Yehoshua’s skill as a real-estate agent, but they trusted Olga. Contemporary photographs show her holding a whip to protect herself while riding on a white donkey among the Bedouin tents and in the streets of Jaffa. On one occasion, while she was delivering the infant son of a wealthy Christian Arab of Jaffa who owned land south of the city, she learned of ten thousand dunams for sale in Wadi Deiran. She told Yehoshua about this, and in 1890 he completed his first land deal.

In the following years, because the Zionist organizations were reluctant to pay for land, the Hankin couple frequently purchased lands and then convinced the Jewish Agency or others to finance the "done deal." In this way the Hankin couple became responsible for most of the major land purchases of the Zionist Organization in Ottoman Palestine and Mandatory Palestine. "In 1890, Yehoshua worked to purchase 2,500 acres of the lands of Duran, where the city of Rehovot is now located. In total, more than 148,262 acres purchased by Yehoshua were used for the establishment of the Jewish settlement in the Land of Israel... Olga was the driving force behind Yehoshua in his dedication to the redemption of the land." What is more, she supported him by working as a midwife, since he never made any money in his real estate dealings.

Olga Hankin died at her house in Tel Aviv on April 2, 1942, and was buried in the Galilee in a tomb made of pinkish limestone that her husband had built for them near their other house at Ma'ayan Harod on Mount Gilboa in the Jezreel Valley. He died two years after her and was buried by her side.

== Feminism ==
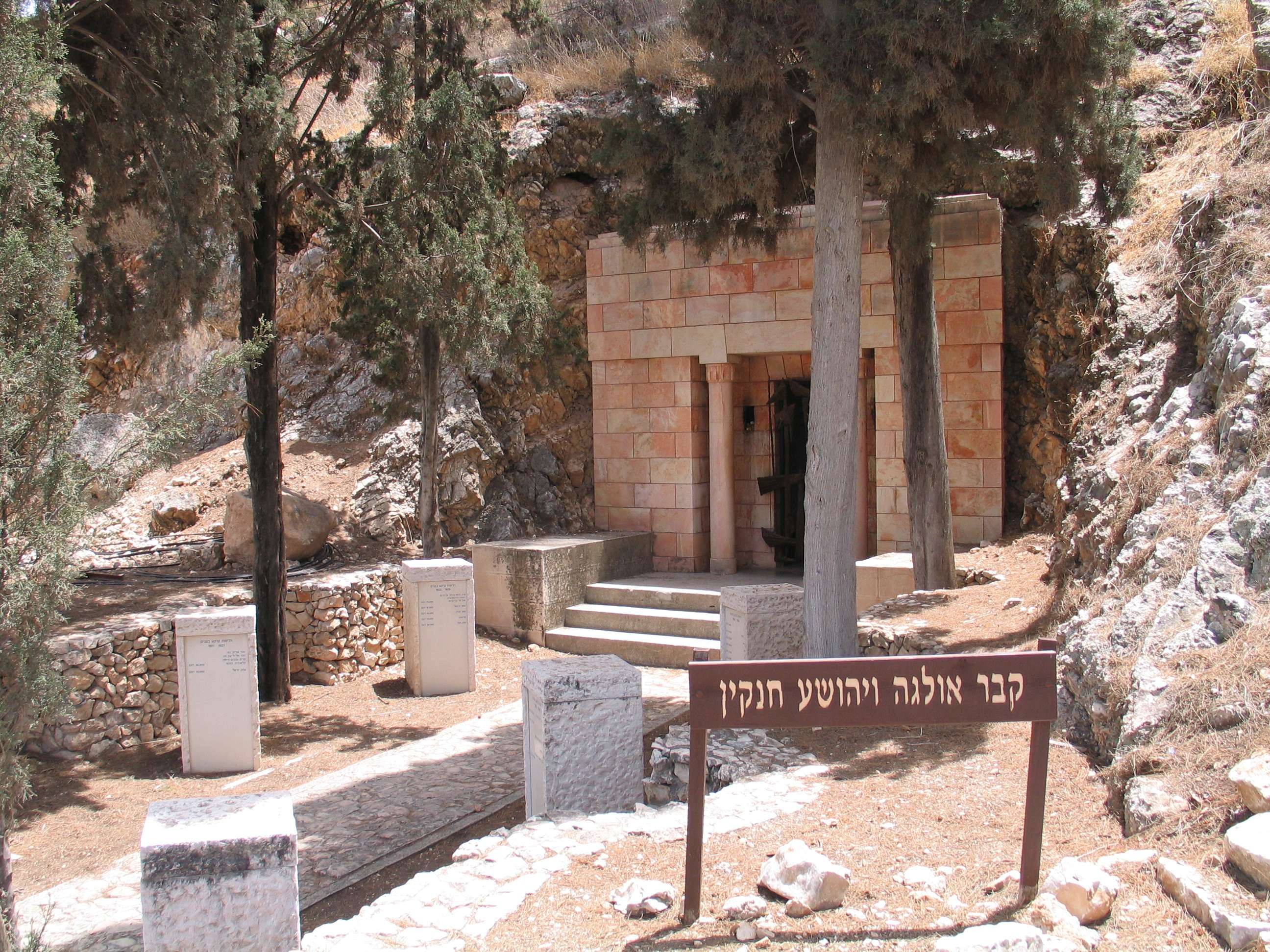
Tomb of Olga and Yehoshua Hankin at Ma'ayan Harod

Olga Hankin was reputed to be a brave woman, who would ride alone on horseback, even at night, to perform as a midwife for women, whether Jewish or Arab. She believed that women should have a profession; before immigrating to the Land of Israel she was a telegrapher on the Trans-Siberian Railway in order to save money for her tuition to study midwifery. She was also known to have encouraged the young people of her extended family to study, especially the young women.

In an undated letter to the Tel-Aviv municipality, Olga Hankin wrote to complain about the lack of women's names among the city's street names, indicating her gender outlook: "Why is there no mention [in street names] of women among the biblical names, heroes of the nation, such as Deborah and others?... I hope my words will find an echo in the hearts of the committee members and that they will correct the distortion and will also invite women to participate in the naming committee." Notably, as of 2022 there are five streets in Israel named after Yehoshua Hankin and 13 named after Hankin but not one named after Olga Hankin.

== Zionist activism ==
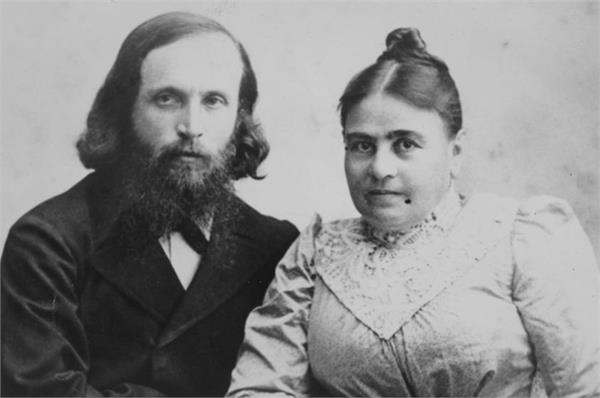
Yehoshua and Olga Hankin, 1910

In addition to her crucial work in redeeming lands for the Jewish people and the future Jewish state once she had immigrated to the Land of Israel, Olga Hankin was also active in Zionist organizations while still living in St. Petersburg. She resided there with two of her siblings, Shimshon (1865–1937) and Fania (Fanny Belkind Feinberg, 1860–1942); their home served as "a meeting place for revolutionary students, writers, and thinkers active in Hovevei Zion [Lovers of Zion], as well as a shelter for women who gave birth out of wedlock." Olga joined a group of young Jews influenced by the nationalist awakening in Europe, who despaired of universal and socialist ideals and believed they would never attain equal rights in Russia. They formed a Zionist movement which they named Bilu, whose primary goal was the agricultural settlement of the Land of Israel. Belkind family members, in particular Olga's brother Israel Belkind and sister Fania, were prominent among the founders. Olga attended Bilu meetings as well as those of the Maskilim and Hovevei Zion activists.

== Legacy ==
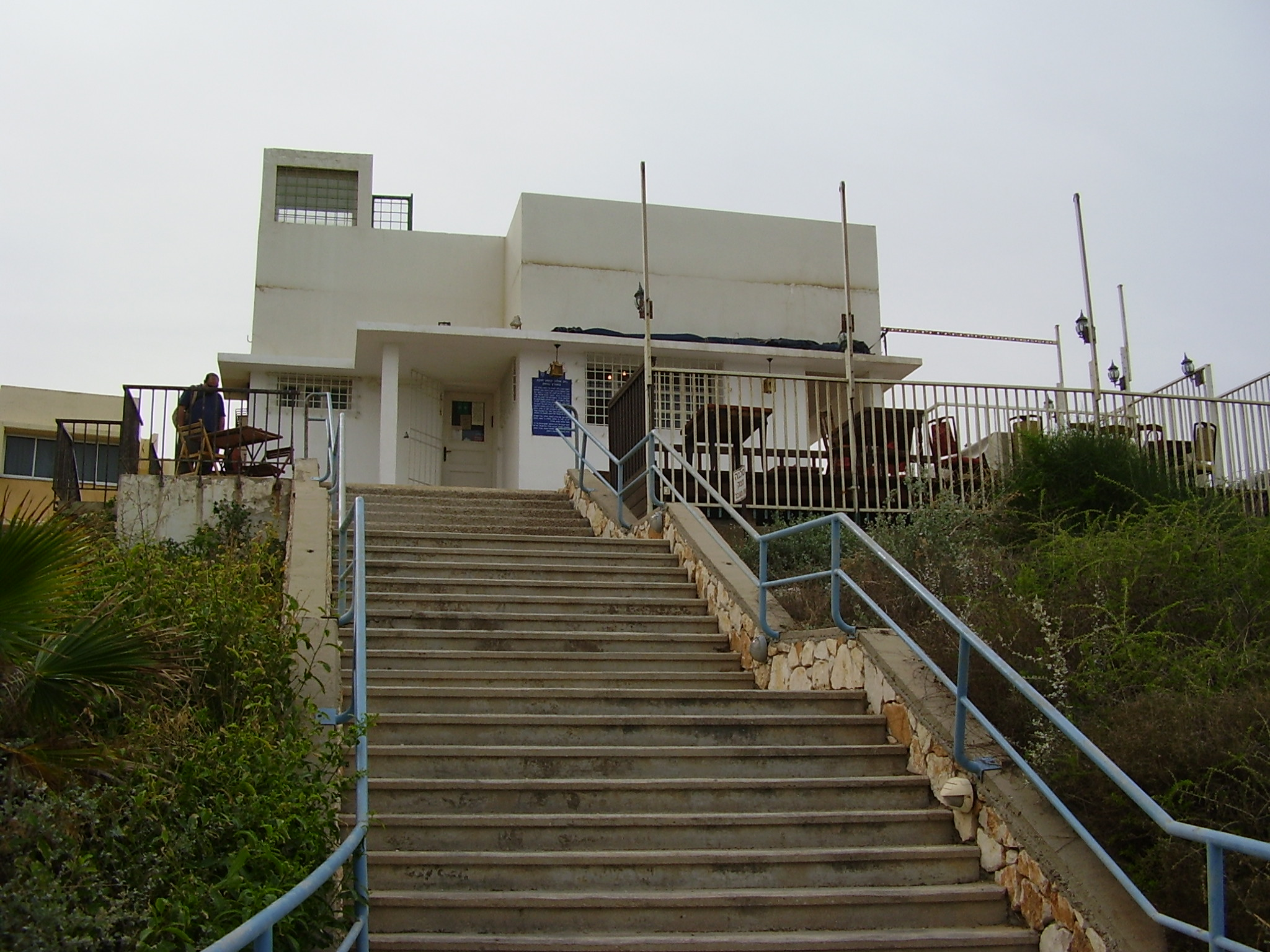
Olga and Yehoshua Hankin's clifftop home in Givat Olga

Givat Olga (Olga's Hill), a neighborhood of Hadera, is named after Olga Hankin. The neighborhood originally consisted of one house on the top of a cliff by the Binyamin Bay on the Mediterranean coast, built but never lived in by the Hankins. It was built, in Bauhaus style, as a security house following the Arab Revolt of 1936-1939 and overlooks the lands of the coastal plain purchased by the Hankins in the 1920s and 1930s. The neighborhood of Givat Olga was established in 1949 and as of 2020 houses over 15,000 residents. The historic house, known as Beit Olga Hankin (Olga Hankin's House) was a state of disrepair and neglect until 2004, when it was renovated. However the site was closed in 2021 because the coastal kurkar cliff upon which it stands is unstable.

== External links and references ==
- Amit, Irit, and R. Kark. Hankin: Two Loves. Tel Aviv: Milo, 1998.
- Bachi Kolodny, Ruth. If You Go Along with Me: The Story of Olga Hankin. Jerusalem: 1980
- Biography of Yehoshua Hankin Zionism and Israel Information Center
