= Beyle =

Beyle is a Yiddish name, and may refer to:

== Given name ==
- Beyle Schaechter-Gottesman (1920–2013), Yiddish poet and songwriter

== Surname ==
- Abdirahman Duale Beyle (b. 1955 or 1956), Somali economist and Foreign Minister of Somalia
- Marie-Henri Beyle (1783–1842), French writer, better known by his pen name Stendhal

== See also ==
- Bayle (disambiguation)
