= John N. Belkin =

American entomologist

- Born: 1913; Petrograd, Russian Empire
- Died: 1980 (aged 66–67); USA
- Education: Cornell University
- Scientific career
- Fields: Entomology
- Workplaces: University of California

John N. Belkin (1913–1980) was an American entomologist.

== Biography ==
Belkin was born in 1913 in Petrograd, Russian Empire, and became a citizen of the United States by 1938. The same year, he got a bachelor's degree at Cornell University.

Belkin continued to work at Cornell, at first as assistant entomologist for two years, and later as an entomology Instructor, a position which he kept till 1942. The same year, he got a job as junior entomologist for the Tennessee Valley Authority, but was drafted into the United States Army Sanitary Corps.

From 1943 to 1945, he was the commanding officer of the 420th Malaria Survey Detachment in the Solomon Islands, where he studied mosquito specimens that he would later use in his volume The Mosquitoes of the South Pacific. In 1945 he was reassigned to General Douglas MacArthur as a liaison officer with the Russian army.

When his army service finished in 1946, Belkin returned to Cornell, where he got his PhD in medical entomology. Then he worked at Rutgers University as an assistant specialist for a short period of time, from 1946 to 1949, and was an associate professor for the Associated Colleges of Upper New York. In 1949 he moved to California, where he took a position as assistant professor of entomology at the University of California in Los Angeles. In 1952 he became an associate professor, and a professor of entomology in 1958. Four years later, he became a professor of zoology at UCLA, a job that he kept until he died in 1980.

The mosquito genus Johnbelkinia was named in his memory.
