= Lev Belkind =

Soviet scientist, engineer and historian

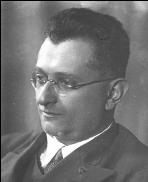
Lev Belkind

Lev Davidovich Belkind (Russian: Лев Давидович Белькинд; (27 August 1896, Myrhorod – November 16, 1969) was a Soviet scientist, engineer and historian; author of numerous publications on the history of science and technology.

His academic activity is associated with the Moscow Power Engineering Institute (Technical University) (Russian: Московский энергетический институт (технический университет)), where he has founded the department of Lighting Engineering (Russian: Кафедра Светотехники) in the Physics-Energy Faculty (Russian: Физико-энергетический факультет (ФИЗЭН)) in 1932. In 1937, he became the first dean of the faculty of Electro-Physics upon its formation (Russian: Электрофизический факультет (ЭлФИЗ)). Later he has headed the department of History of Engineering (Russian: Кафедра истории техники)

He was fluent in Russian, English, French and German, and knowledgeable in additional languages. Belkind was a researcher and collector of materials on the history of science and technology, both Russian and International. He was considered an authority in the field of scientific history, being an author of unique biographical research work of a number of influential figures in the Russian science.

In recognition of his scientific achievements and contribution he was awarded the "Honored Scientist and Technologist" title (Russian: Заслуженный деятель науки и техники). by the Soviet Academy of Sciences.

== Partial list of works and publications ==
=== Biographical Books ===
- "Aleksander Nikolayevich Ladygin", (Russian: Александр Николаевия Ладыгин, Очерк Жизни и Деятельности, Государственное Энергетическое Издательство, Москва, 1948)
- "Aleksander Ilyich Shpakovsky", (Russian: Александр Ильич Шпаковский, Государственное Энергетическое Издательство, Москва, 1949)
- "Pavel Nikolayevich Yablochkov", (Russian: Павел Николаевич Яблочков, Жизнь и Труды, Государственное Энергетическое Издательство, 1950), Second Edition: (Russian: Павел Николаевич Яблочков 1847-1894, Иэдательство Академии Наук СССР, Москва, 1962)
- "Karl Adolfovich Krug" (Russian: Карл Адольфович Круг, Москва-Ленинград, 1956)
- "Thomas Alva Edison", Short edition: (Russian: Томас Альва Эдисон, Краткая Брошюра-Лекция, Издательство "Знание", Москва, 1957), Full edition:(Russian: Томас Альва Эдисон 1847-1931, Издательство "Наука", Москва, 1964)
- "Charles Proteus Steinmetz", (Russian: Чарлз Протеус Штейнмец, Издательство "Наука", Москва, 1965)
- "André-Marie Ampère", (Russian: Андре-Мари Ампер, Издательство "Наука", Москва, 1968), Bulgarian translation: Bulgarian: Държавно Издательство "Техника", София, 1974

=== Technical Dictionaries ===
- English-Russian tank dictionary (Russian: Англо-русский танковый словарь, учебное пособие / Гл. ред. Л. Д. Белькинд; Ред.: Е. А. Чудаков, Д. С. Лотте., ГОСТехсиздат, 1943)
- English-Russian dictionary on caoutchouc and rubber, Yashunskaya F.I., Chief Editor: L.D. Belkind (Russian: Яшунская Ф.И. Англо-русский словарь по каучуку и резине. Главный редактор профессор Л.Д.Белькинд, М. Гостехиздат 1944г)
- English-Russian Polytechnical Dictionary (Russian: Белькинд Л.Д. Англо-Русский Политехнический Словарь, 1946)
- French-Russian Polytechnical Dictionary (Russian: Французско-русский политехнический словарь, Л.Д. Белькинд, Гостехиздат, 1948) (French: Dictionary polytechnique francais-russe)
- German-Russian Hydrotechnical Dictionary (Russian: Немецко-русский гидротехнический словарь. издание 1949г. - под. ред. проф. д-ра тех. наук Гришина М.М., гл.ред. проф. Белькинд Л.Д)
- International Electro-Technical Dictionary (Russian: Международный электротехнический словарь. Под ред. Л.Д. Белькинда. 350 терминов. М., Физматгиз, 1958., Международный электротехнический словарь. Ред. Л.Д. Белькинд и Г. А. Тягунов. Пер. А. С. Гасюка. 600 терминов. М., Физматгиз, 1959.)
- International dictionary of lighting engineering, Russian-English-French-German (Russian: Белькинд Л.Д. Международный светотехнический словарь. Русско-английский-французский-немецкий, 1963)
- German-Russian Chemico-Technological Dictionary (Russian: Немецко-Русский химико-технологический словарь)
- English-Russian Dictionary of Machine Elements (Russian: Англо-русский словарь по деталям машин, (с приложением алфавитного указателя русских терминов) / ред. : Л. Д. Белькинд. - М. : Физматлит, 1959)

=== Books on the History of Science and Technology ===
- "History of Engineering", L.D. Belkind, I.Ya. Konfederatov, Ya. A. Shneyberg (Russian: Белькинд Л. Д., Конфедератов И. Я., Шнейберг Я. А.), История техники, Москва-Ленинград, 1956)
- "History of Energy Engineering", L.D. Belkind, O.I. Veselovsky, I.Ya. Konfederatov & Ya.A. Schneiberg (Russian: Л.Д. Белькинд, О.И. Веселовский, И.Я Конфедератов и Я.А. Шнейберг. История энергетической техники, Издание второе, переработанное, Государственное энергетическое издательство, 1960)
- "50 years of Moscow Power Engineering Institute", (Russian: 50 лет Московского ордена Ленина энергетического института имени В.М. Молотова 1905-1955, Белькинд Л.Д., Елизаров П.П., Мешков В.В. и др., Москва, 1955)

=== Articles Published in Collections of Works by Different Authors ===
- Collection of works on the History of Technology, #3, 1953, Aleksandr Ilyich Shpakovski (Russian: Труды по Истории Техники, Выпуск III, Издательство Академии Наук СССР, Москва, 1953, А.И.Шпаковский (Из фонда портретов детелей науки и техники))
- Collection of works on the History of Technology, #6, 1953, (Russian: Труды по Истории Техники, Выпуск VI, Издательство Академии Наук СССР, Москва, 1953, Из истории открытия явления электрической дуги)
- "Figures in Russian Science" Articles about prominent figures in science (Russian: Люди русской науки: Очерки о выдающихся деятелях естествознания и техники, Издательство "Техника", Москва, 1965, "Владимир Николаевич Чиколев (1845-1898)", "Михаил Осипович Доливо-Добровольский (1862-1919) / Л. Д. Белькинд; О. Н. Веселовский. ", "Павел Николаевич Яблочков (1847-1894)","Шпаковский Александр Ильич (1823-1881)","Василий Владимирович Петров (1761—1834) С предисл. и вступ. статьей акад. С. И. Вавилова"")
- Co-editor and author of articles in the Technical Encyclopedia, published in 1927

=== Autobiography ===
- Belkind L. D., My Autobiography, 1946 (Russian: Белькинд Л. Д., Моя автобиография, 1946)
- Belkind L. D., My Autobiography (Publication of M. V. Kalashnikova), 100 years from the birth of historian of technology (Russian: Белькинд Л. Д., Моя автобиография (публикация М.В.Калашниковой), К 100-летию со дня рождения историка техники, Вопросы истории естествознания и техники, 1998, #3)
- Belkind L. D., Memories of my past. 1957-1969

=== Publications about Prof. Belkind by other authors ===
- In memory of Lev Davidovich Belkind, G. I. Ashkenazi, Svetotekhnika Journal №8, 1986 (Russian: * Памяти Льва Давидовича Белькинда, Г.И. Ашкенази, Светотехника, №8, 1986.)
- Historian of Technology L.D. Belkind and his written legacy, M. V. Kalashnikova, VIET Journal #3, 1998 (Russian: Историк техники Л.Д.Белькинд и его рукописное наследие, М.В.Калашникова, Вопросы истории естествознания и техники, 1998)
