= Ruhama =

Place in Israel

Ruhama: רֻוחָמָה (Hebrew); روحامة (Arabic)
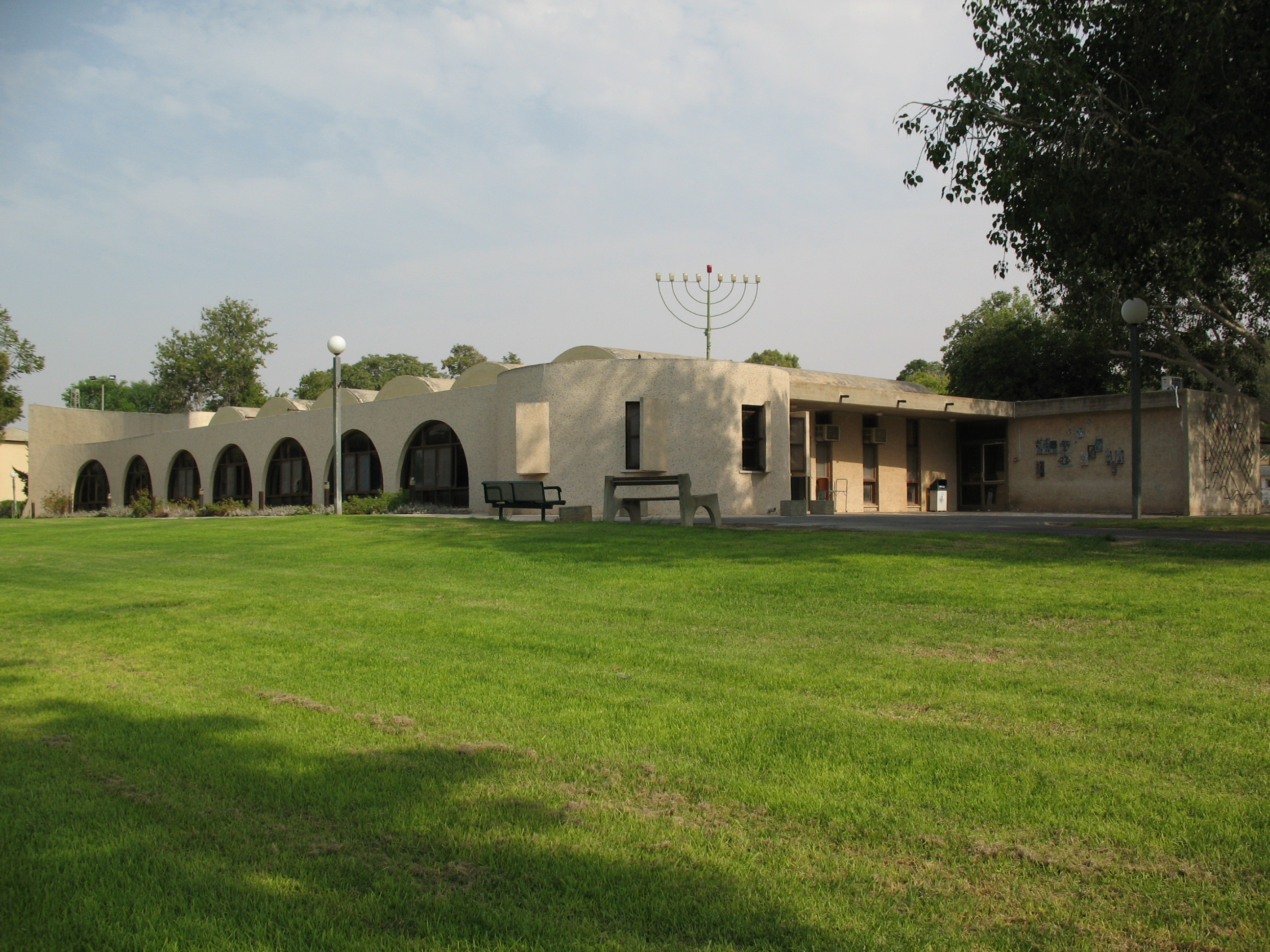

- Location within Ashkelon region of Israel Location within Israel
- Coordinates: 31°29′48″N 34°42′20″E
- Country: Israel
- District: Southern
- Subdistrict: Ashkelon
- Council: Sha'ar HaNegev
- Affiliation: Kibbutz Movement
- Founded: 1912 (original); 1944 (current)
- Founder: Russian Jews (original); Hashomer Hatzair members (current)
- Population (2024): 770

Ruhama (Hebrew: רֻחָמָה) is a kibbutz in the Negev desert in southern Israel. The original settlement, established in 1912, is considered the first modern Jewish settlement in the Negev. Located around ten kilometres east of Sderot and surrounded by a nature reserve, it falls under the jurisdiction of the Sha'ar HaNegev Regional Council. In 2024 it had a population of 770.

== History ==
Ruhama was, for many years, the southernmost settlement of Zionist immigrants to Palestine. Due to its remote location, the settlement faced significant economic challenges and was founded and abandoned three times before being permanently reestablished in 1944.

Ruhama was initially founded in 1912, following a land purchase in 1909 by the Moscow-based Sheerit Israel (Hebrew: שארית ישראל, “Remnant of Israel”) group. The 600 hectares of land, located east of Gaza, originally belonged to the Atawna Bedouin, who lived in the nearby village of al-Jammama and cultivated grain on the land. However, as they required funds for housing and storage facilities in the newly established Bedouin town of Beersheba, they were willing to sell portions of their land, despite Ottoman laws at the time prohibiting Zionist immigration and land purchases in Palestine. The sale was only able to proceed after pressure was applied to the Ottoman authorities in Constantinople and was facilitated through the mediation of the Jewish Colonization Association and a notable from Gaza. The settlement was named "Ruhama" (meaning "mercy") after the biblical verse Hosea 2:23: "And I will have mercy upon her that had not obtained mercy."

Since She’erit Israel never relocated to Palestine, Ruhama remained, for its first 30 years, little more than a small farm primarily worked by laborers from Poalei Zion and Hapoel Hatzair, who planted olive and almond trees and established the first pumping station of Palestine. The majority of the land, however, was leased back to its previous Bedouin owners as recently as November 1913. Due to this arrangement, the limited fruit yield caused by water scarcity, and a devastating locust plague in 1915, Ruhama’s initial settlement phase was financially unviable; by the end of 1917, despite substantial investments from Moscow, Ruhama had accumulated over 200,000 Francs in debt and was repossessed by the Anglo-Palestine Bank.

The active settlement phase had already ended shortly before: during World War I, Zionist guards from the organizations Hashomer and HaMagen were stationed in Ruhama. Since there were personal connections between HaMagen and the anti-Ottoman espionage network Nili, Nili also chose Ruhama as its main base in southern Israel. As a result, in 1917, the Ottomans deported all workers from Ruhama.

After the war, a small group of 13 workers undertook a new settlement attempt. Yet again, Ruhama proved unprofitable: only the cultivation of tobacco on 12 hectares yielded significant income; the nearly 100 hectares of almond trees produced little harvest, a mill proved uncompetitive, and 300 hectares of land were once more leased to Arabs. By 1925, most Jews were on the verge of leaving. In 1929, Ruhama was completely abandoned and possibly subsequently destroyed.

According to various sources and authors, a brief and final settlement attempt was made in 1933, but it was again destroyed as early as 1936 in the course of the Arab revolt of 1936-1939. However, this last settlement phase is not documented in all sources: a 1938 article suggests instead that Ruhama had already been voluntarily abandoned some years ago.

Ruhama was resettled one final time in 1944, this time by Romanian Jews. The neighboring village of al-Jammama also grew during the 1930s and 1940s, reaching 120 buildings, and in 1944, an elementary school was established there. During the 1948 Arab-Israeli War, however, al-Jammama was depopulated following a military assault on May 22, after which Ruhama began cultivating the land nearby. By 1949, Ruhama had a population of 275 and encompassed an area of 850 hectares.

The film Sweet Mud (2006) was filmed in Ruhama and Nir Eliyahu.

In 2006, a group of older ideologues blocked an attempt by the younger members of Ruhama to establish a synagogue. In 2012 a synagogue was established in memory of a boy killed in a missile attack near Gaza.

== Economy ==
The economy is based on four agricultural branches: field crops, irrigated cultivation, orchards and henhouses, but many of Ruhama's members work outside the kibbutz.

Like many kibbutzim, Ruhama went through a process of privatization in the late 1990s.

The kibbutz operated a factory which produced brushes, including toothbrushes, which was closed in July 2019.

In 1984, Ruhama established a PCB design company.

Ruhama has a full-care center for elderly patients with 25 beds. The center cares for patients suffering from Alzheimer's disease, Parkinson's disease, dementia, paralysis and stroke.

== Landmarks ==
Atar HaRishonim (אתר הראשונים,"Site of the Pioneers"), located just outside the perimeter fence of the kibbutz, marks the place where the early settlers built the first houses and dug a well. Also on show are farming tools used almost 100 years ago.

== Notable people ==
- Recha Freier, a deputy to Zionist leader Henrietta Szold moved to Ruhama in 1947
- Jonathan Roshfeld, MasterChef Israel
- Avi Toledano, Israeli singer

== Gallery ==
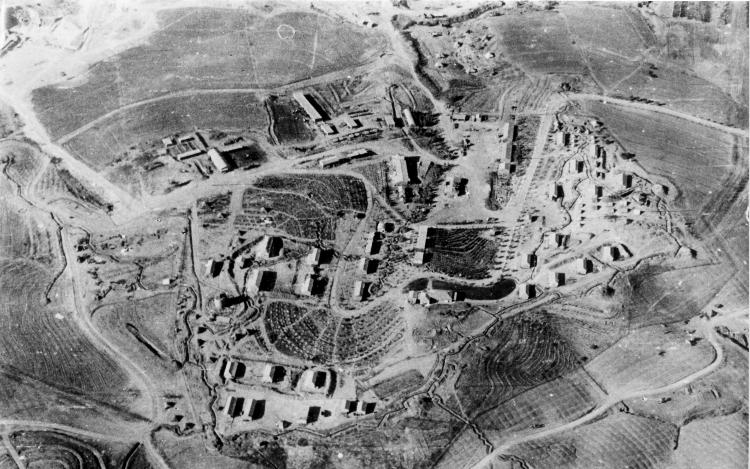
Kibbutz Ruhama 1948

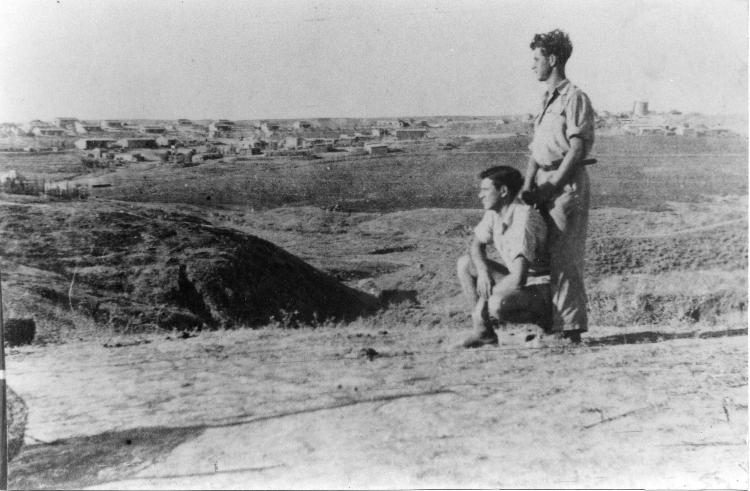
View of Ruhama from the airfield, August 1948

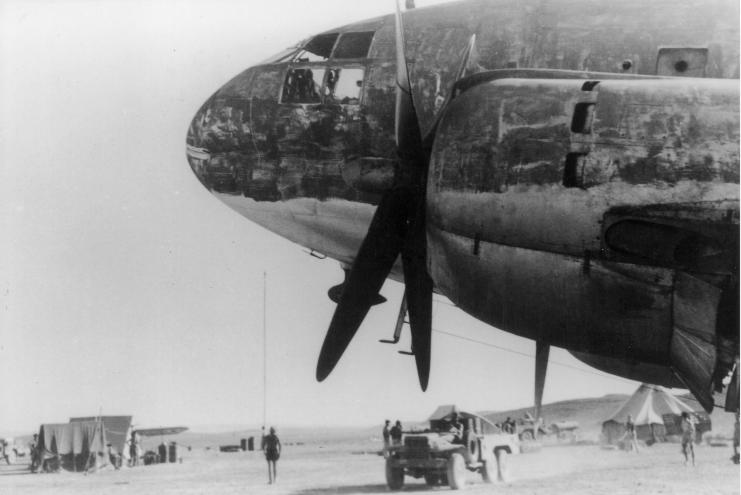
Ruhama airfield. August 1948. Operation Avak

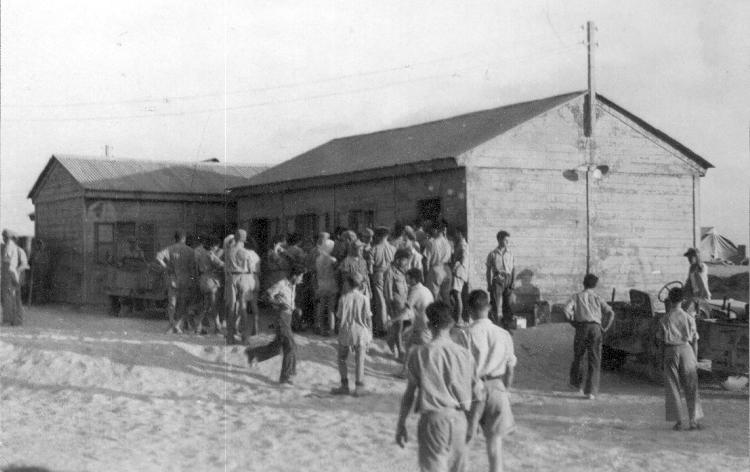
Yiftach Brigade Headquarters, Kibbutz Ruhama, 1948

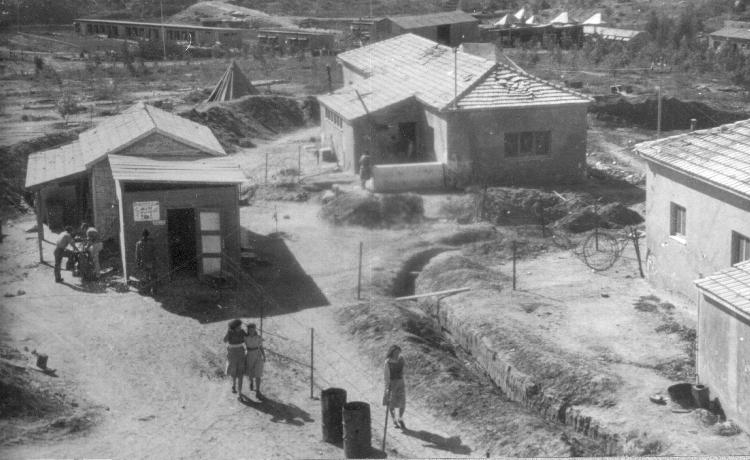
Kibbutz Ruhama, 1948

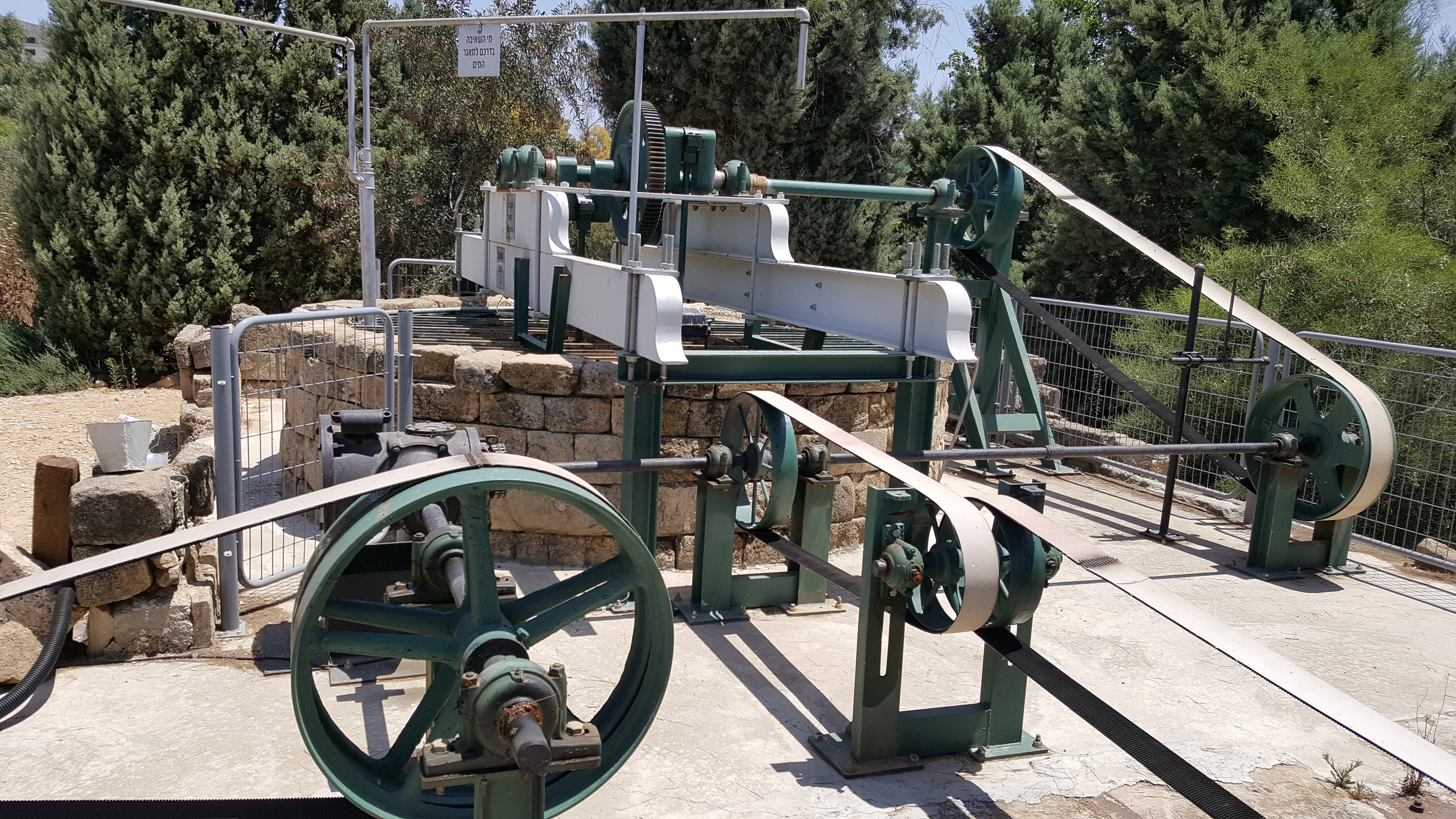
Ruhama's pumping station

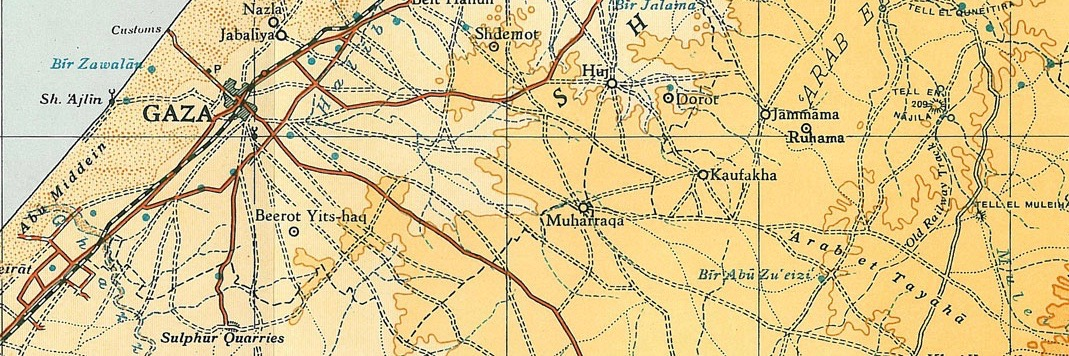
Ruhama 1945 1:250,000

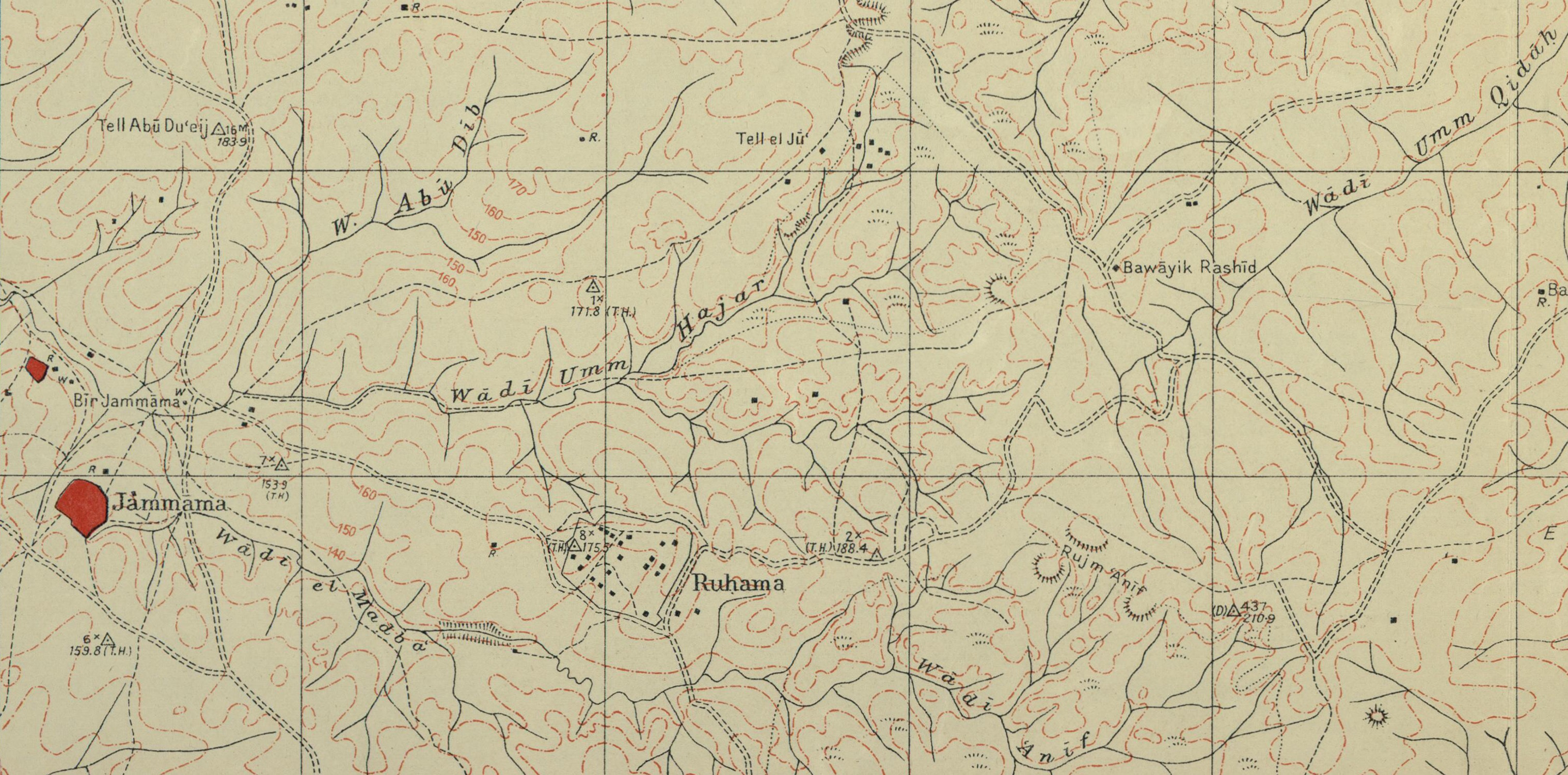
Ruhama 1947 1:20,000
