= Israel Belkind =

Russian-Jewish activist and author (1861–1929)

- ישראל בלקינד
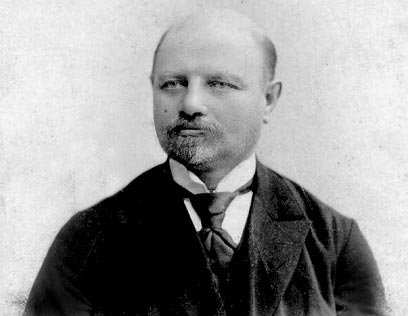
- Born: 1861; Logoisk, Minsk Governorate, Russian Empire
- Died: 1929 (aged 67–68); Berlin, Germany
- Burial place: Rishon LeZion, Israel
- Organization: Palestine Pioneers
- Known for: Designing the flag of Israel
- Relatives: Olga Hankin (sister)

Israel Belkind (Note: Russian: Исраэль Белкинд; Belarusian: Ізраэль Белкінд; Hebrew: ישראל בלקינד.) (1861–1929) was a Russian-Jewish activist, author, educator, and historian who founded the Palestine Pioneers during the First Aliyah. He became involved with the Zionist movement in the 1880s, when continuous Russian pogroms led him to assert that Jewish assimilation was not viable in any part of the world, and it was around this time that he created the design of the "Flag of Zion" that was officially adopted by the First Zionist Congress in 1897 and eventually by the State of Israel in 1948. As he sought to increase the growth and prosperity of the Jewish community in Ottoman Palestine, Belkind himself immigrated and, following an initial period in agriculture, began establishing or teaching at educational institutions at various locations, such as Tel Aviv, Rishon LeZion, Jerusalem, and Haifa. He published several works in which he expressed his desire to correct the "historical error" that was the alleged dispersion of the Jews after the destruction of the Second Temple. He also advanced the opinion that the Palestinian Arabs could be integrated with Zionism because they were fundamentally ethnic Jews who had been Arabized and converted to Christianity or Islam.

== Biography ==
Israel Belkind was born in 1861 in Logoisk, near Minsk, Russian Empire, to Meir and Shifra Belkind. His siblings were Shimon, Sonia and Olga Belkind Hankin, the last a feminist who was involved with redeeming land in Eretz Yisrael. He received a Hebrew education from his father, who was a leader in the movement which promoted Hebrew education in Russia. Belkind also attended a Russian gymnasium and initially intended to attend university. However, the wave of antisemitic attacks and pogroms against Jews in southern Russia on 1881 instead led him to become intensively involved in Zionist activities. In 1929, Belkind died in Berlin where he had gone to seek medical treatment. His body was brought back to Palestine for burial. He was interred in Rishon LeZion.

== Career ==
=== Zionist activism ===
Belkind organized the first organized group of Biluim on 21 January 1882, with the aim of promoting Jewish settlement in Ottoman Palestine. To this end, he invited a group of fourteen Jewish ex-university students from Kharkov to his home and together they formed the group which was originally called DAVIO, an acronym for the Hebrew words from Exodus, "Speak unto the children of Israel that they will go forward". Belkind later changed the name to BILU, an acronym for the words from Isaiah, "Beit Yaakov Lechu V'nelcha," "House of Jacob, come and we will go" (Isaiah 2:5). The group shunned diplomatic or political channels, with their sole goal being to settle in Palestine.

These first group of Bilu pioneers arrived at Palestine in July, 1882. He worked first in Mikveh Yisrael and Rishon LeZion, and then moved to Gedera, the first official Bilu community. Belkind, however, was unable to adjust to agricultural labor, and therefore, devoted himself to education.

Belkind was the key leader in the Yishuv's protest movement against representatives of Baron Rothschild.

Belkind proposed a name for the agricultural moshava of Rehovot based on the Book of Genesis: "And he called the name of it Rehoboth; and he said: 'For now the Lord hath made room for us, and we shall be fruitful in the land'." (Genesis 26:22).

=== Educational work ===
His first teaching post was at a private school in Jaffa, and he then moved to Jerusalem where he taught at the Alliance israélite universelle. In 1904, Israel Belkind established an educational institute in the village of Meir Shfeya, which took in orphans from the Kishinev pogrom. This made it the first youth village in the country. He called it Kiryat Sefer. However, after two years of dispute with the Edmond James de Rothschild's emissaries at the colony, Belkind was prompted to move the children to Ben Shemen.

=== Literary work ===
Belkind published several textbooks and wrote for contemporary journals. He was the editor of HaMeir, a monthly publication on settlement and the Yishuv. He published his memoirs, "The First Steps of the Jewish Settlement in Palestine" (1918) in the United States during World War I.

In 1928 he published a geographical work in Russian, The Land of Israel Today, as well as an anthropological work on the Palestinian Arabs in Hebrew, Arabs in Eretz Israel, a book in which he advances the ideas that the Arabs of Palestine are descended from the ancient Hebrews were eventually converted to Christianity and then Islam, and that the alleged dispersion of Jews after the destruction of the Temple by the Roman general Titus only concerned the upper layers of society whereas "workers of the land remained attached to their land". He therefore argued that Jewish settlers should embrance local Arabs as their own and proposed the opening of Hebrew schools for Muslim Arabs of Palestine to teach them Arabic, Hebrew and universal culture.

== See also ==
- Flag of Israel

== Sources ==
- Slutsky, Yehuda (2007). "Belkind". Encyclopaedia Judaica. Volume 3 (2nd ed.). Detroit: Macmillan Reference USA in association with the Keter Pub. House. p. 297. ISBN 978-0028659282.
