= Bilu (movement) =

Jewish movement

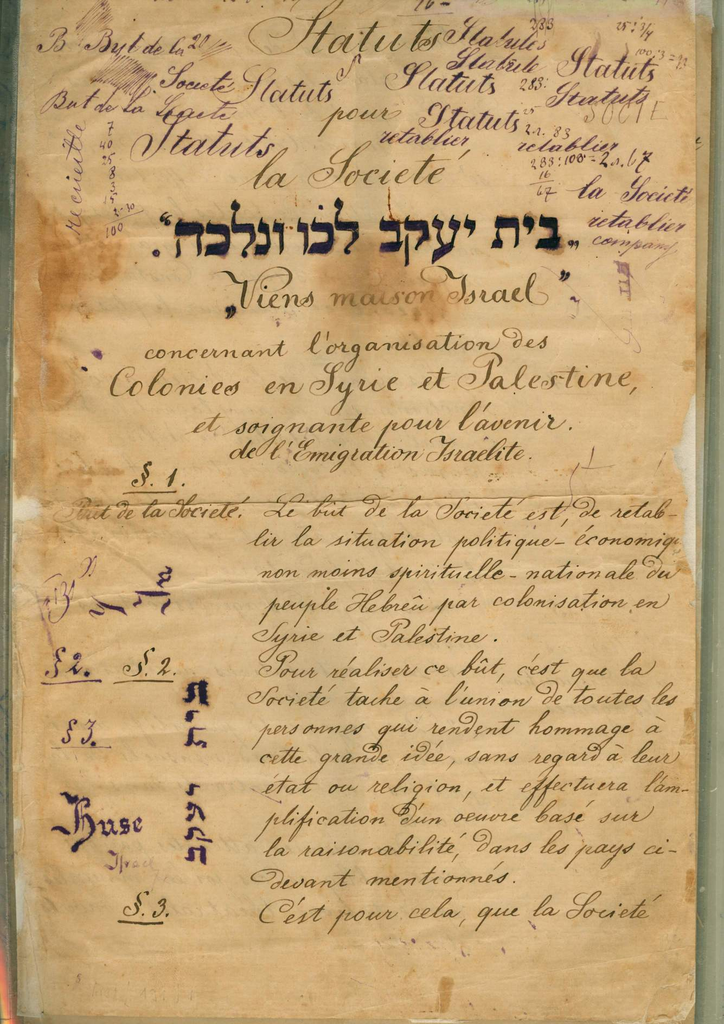
Bilu charter, 1882

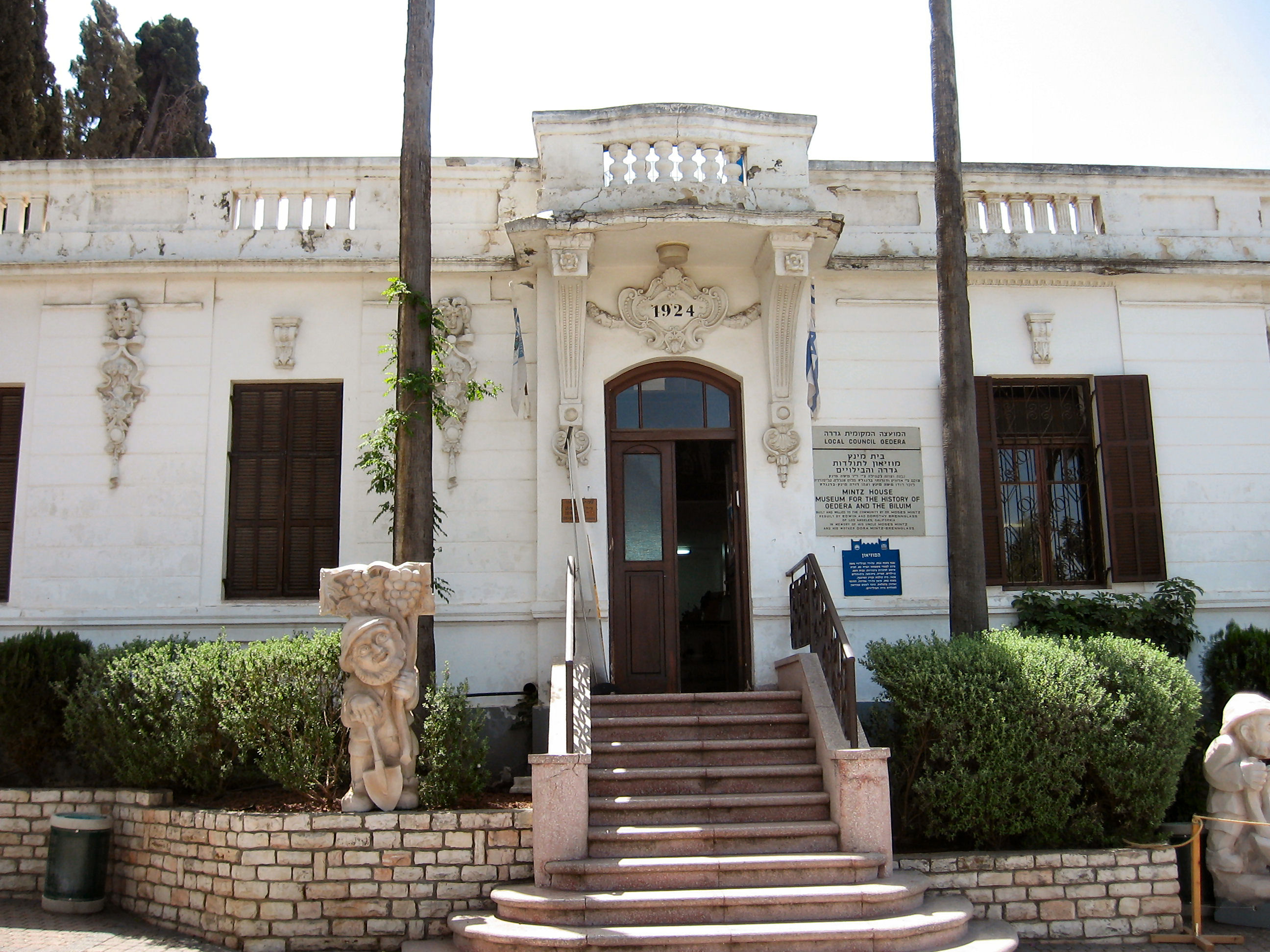
Bilu Museum in Gedera

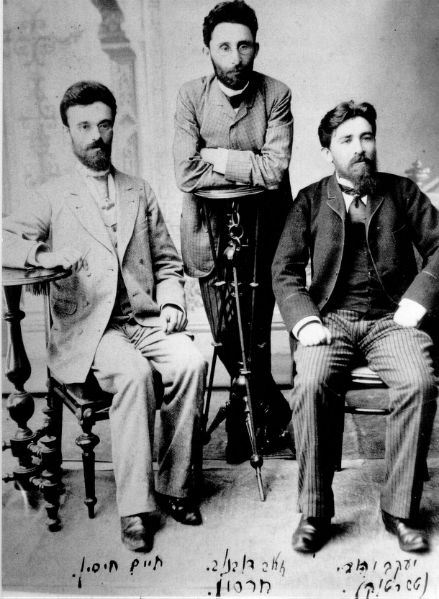
Bilu members Ze'ev Vladimir Dubnov, Ya'acov Shertok and Chaim Chissin in Russia in 1890

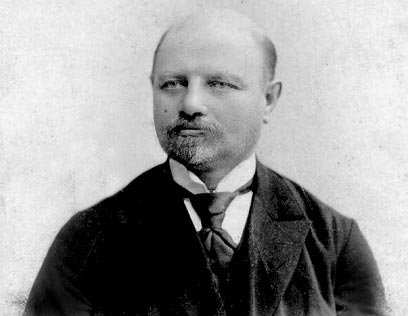
Israel Belkind (founder of movement).

Bilu (Hebrew: ביל״ו; also Palestine Pioneers) was a Jewish Zionist movement of the late 19th century, fueled predominantly by the immigration of Russian Jews, whose goal was the agricultural settlement of the Land of Israel. Its members were known as Bilu'im, and the movement sought to inspire Jews to migrate to Ottoman Palestine. The Bilu'im rejected Emancipation and assimilation as viable options for Jewish survival. The movement collapsed as a result of the challenging farming conditions in Palestine and a lack of funding to sustain the settlers.

== Etymology ==
Originally the movement was called Davio, an acronym of the Hebrew words from the Book of Exodus: "Speak unto the children of Israel that they will go forward." The movement's name was later changed by its founder, Israel Belkind, to "Bilu", which is an acronym based on a verse from the Book of Isaiah (2:5) "בית יעקב לכו ונלכה" Beit Ya'akov Lekhu Venelkha ("House of Jacob, let us go [up]").

== History ==
=== Formation ===
The wave of pogroms in 1881–1884, known as "Southern Storms", in conjunction with Tsar Alexander III of Russia's antisemitic May Laws of 1882 prompted mass emigration of Jews from the Russian Empire. The Jews in Russia had originally hoped to move out of the Pale of Settlement (the territory that they were confined to by the authorities), but their hopes were dashed by a proposition from the Russian government for the Jews to move out of Russia entirely. Thus many Jews left; many went to North America, and a smaller group went to Palestine.

On 6 July 1882, the first group of Bilu pioneers emigrated from Russia and arrived in Ottoman Palestine. The group consisted of fourteen university students from Kharkiv led by Israel Belkind, who was later a prominent writer and historian.

=== Initial challenges ===
The arrival of Bilu pioneers marked the beginning of the First Aliyah. They attempted to use farming societies as a way to relieve Jewish economical and social tensions from the Pale of Settlement. Jews were not farmers in the Pale of Settlement, so they saw the "return" to Palestine as a return to their historical practice of farming. As of 1882, there were 525 members in the Bilu movement, all of whom were controlled by the Kharkiv group or "The Central Bureau," controlled the affairs of all Bilu pioneers until all members were brought to Jaffa. The group aimed to set up a model settlement for all Jewry. The Kharkiv group attempted to buy enough land from Turkey so that the entirety of the membership might settle the prospective land, which would enable the Jews to own the land which they were hoping to farm. Responding to local pressures, the Ottoman authorities started restricting Jewish land purchase and immigration to the empire. Bilu pioneers sought approval from the Ottoman Empire to immigrate to Palestine on the grounds of seeking refuge from Russian oppression, but leadership in the Ottoman empire refused to take more refugees to avoid further political discourse. Most Bilu'im returned to Russia after receiving the news that they were not welcome in Palestine. However, fourteen members of the movement continued on to Palestine without the permission of the Ottoman Empire and arrived in July 1882. Some members of the Central Bureau went to Jaffa, but shortly after, arrival funds ran dry, and the group could not afford to send for the rest of the members waiting in Russia.

=== The situation in Palestine ===
Most of the Jewish population consisted of Sephardim. The Ashkenazi population was much smaller and much less well off. Some Jews took a short stay at the Jewish farming school in Mikveh Israel with the hopes of furthering their agricultural abilities; Jews were not farmers in Russia. However, this stay was cut short due to hostile encounters with Orthodox Old Yishuv with opposing world views. The continued hostility from the Orthodox Jewish population drove Russian immigrants out of Mikveh Israel. After leaving, the hopeful settlers joined Hovevei Zion ("Lovers of Zion"), unofficially led by Leon Pinsker. Members aided in establishing Rishon LeZion ("First to Zion"), which was an agricultural cooperative. However, Jewish aspiration for agricultural societies did not align with the skill sets many immigrants possessed, which caused them to reach out for help from Baron Edmond James de Rothschild and Baron Maurice de Hirsch. The settlers had previously refused help because the Barons wanted some control over how the colonies they would be funding would operate. After the Bilu'im admitted to needing help, Hirsch and Rothschild provided funding that led to the establishment of the local wine industry as a result of more successful agricultural work. In 1886, construction began on a winery in Rishon LeZion that became a successful wine-exporting enterprise.

In the winter of 1884, another group of Bilu pioneers founded Gedera. Gedera was established on a tract of land purchased from the Arab village of Qatra by Yehiel Michel Pines of the Hovevei Zion through the auspices of the French consul in Jaffa.

== Goals for the movement ==
The Bilu movement's ideology consisted of six articles:

1. The return of the people Israel to their historic land
2. The rejection of any discussion of national spiritual revival in favor of Jewish settlements in Palestine as the beginning of national rebirth
3. The dismissal of European Jewish emancipation and other progressive ideas as guarantees of Jewish survival
4. Bringing Jewish people to Palestine to form both physical colonies and spiritual centers
5. The recognition that territory is an essential part of Jewish national survival
6. The assertion of the society as pioneering and avant-garde

The movement was looking to educate Jewish youth based on the notion that the Jews would be outsiders in any land except for Palestine, where they should consider themselves native. Young people were the ideal audience because they were generally robust and likely capable of manual labor. The Bilu movement sought to spread the belief that even if Jewish people were to give up their Jewish identities to be accepted by their neighbors, they would never achieve true acceptance, and should therefore not relinquish their Jewish identities. One of the foundational beliefs of the Bilu movement was the belief that Jews should immigrate to Palestine. However, many Bilu'im were not financially prepared or emotionally equipped for emigration out of Europe. Leadership central to the movement, headquartered in Kharkiv (in modern day Ukraine), made it clear to many Bilu'im that the movement could not fund a mass emigration. Thus, should settlers struggle, they would have to turn to external sources for financial aid.

The Bilu'im was one of the few Zionist movements that focused on both personal and national revival. Scholar Baruch Kimmerling argues that the group was more religiously- than politically-motivated and that "the newcomers lacked a coherent ideological vision of the Jewish state and nation building." Yet "later Zionist historiography" claims the group retrospectively as progenitors of Jewish political society in Palestine. The movement sought to reinvigorate the Jew as a farmer in addition to its goal of ensuring Jewish survival through agricultural settlements.The movement was powered by a group ethos as opposed to the individual goals that motivated other pioneers to Ottoman Palestine.

=== Methods ===
The Bilu movement wanted young Jews to immigrate to Palestine to create farming communities. The Bilu idealists wished to create a new breed of Jewish farmer and reintroduced old colonist solutions to different established nations. The movement adopted almost the entire "maskilic" discourse, hoping for a cultural and spiritual renewal. Maskilim were people educated in Hebrew literature but from a more secular standpoint than the religious Hebrew teachings of the Talmud. These people were often a part of the Haskalah movement, also known as the Jewish Enlightenment. By engaging in maskilic discourse, the Bilu leaders appealed their ideals to more traditional and progressive thinkers alike. Some consider the Bilu movement as pioneers of Labor Zionism.

== Collapse of the movement ==
As time went on, the number of Bilu immigrants in Palestine began to decline. It was not easy to live as an agriculturalist in Palestine. Though agriculture was a part of the society, farming settlements tend to be beholden to a scope of natural weather disasters and do require some sort of financial backing to succeed. As a result of challenging farming season, a lack of financial means, and the variability of wine fit for sale, the Russian Bilu'im ceased to exist. Similarly among other sects of Bilu'im, such as the activists in Constantinople, fiscal stability proved to be a problem for advancing the movement, and many activists emigrated to Palestine. There, they worked in agriculture as best they could, but continued to struggle. Some emigrated to the United States, funded by the director of the Israeli Mikveh. The aforementioned Gederah became the primary Bilu settlement, and it is known as such today.

== See also ==
- Aliyah
- First Aliyah
- Gar'in
- Hechalutz
- Isaiah 2
- Yishuv
- Youth village
