= Bentwich =

Bentwich is a surname. Notable people with the surname include:

- Helen Bentwich (1892–1972), British philanthropist and politician
- Herbert Bentwich (1856–1932), British Zionist leader and lawyer
- Joseph Bentwich (1902–1982), Israeli educator
- Norman Bentwich (1883–1971), British barrister and legal academic
