= Hillel Yaffe Medical Center =

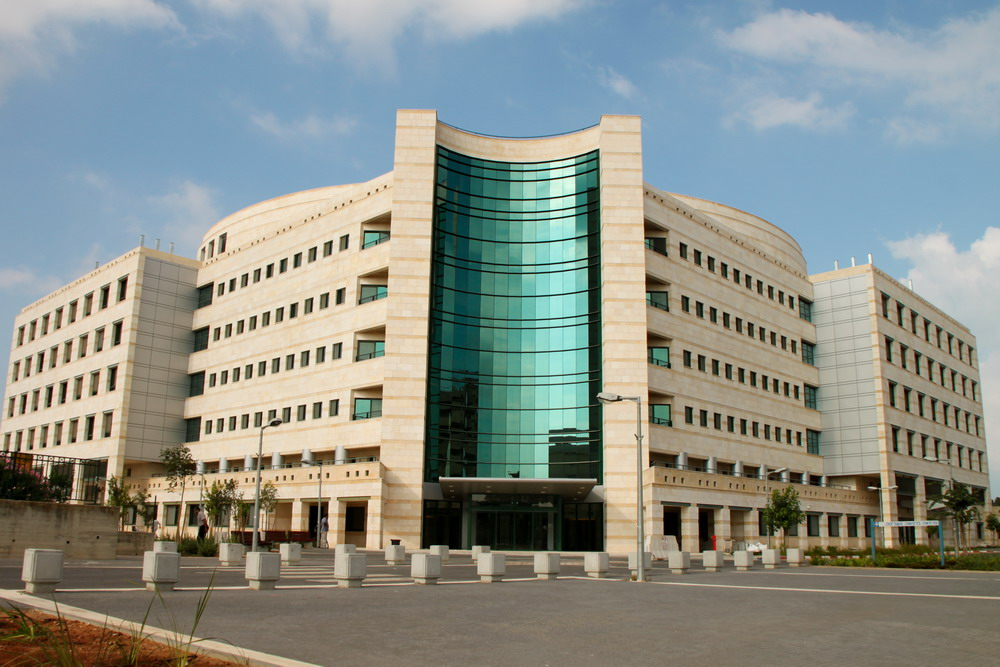
- Inpatient B building

Geography
- Location: Hadera, Israel
- Coordinates: 32°27′05″N 34°53′45″E

Organisation
- Type: District General

Services
- Beds: 601

History
- Opened: 1957

Links
- Website: hy.health.gov.il
- Lists: Hospitals in Israel

The Hillel Yaffe Medical Center (Hebrew: מרכז רפואי הלל יפה) is a major hospital on the western edge of Hadera, Israel. It serves a population of about 600,000 residents in an area ranging from Zikhron Ya'akov in the north to Netanya in the south, from the Mediterranean coast in the west to Umm el-Fahm and the Green Line in the east. The center is named after Hillel Yaffe, a pioneering Yishuv doctor who worked in nearby Jewish settlements during the First Aliyah in the early 20th century.

== History ==
- 1957 – The hospital was founded in a number of small wooden shacks that were erected on the sand dunes to the west of Hadera.
- 1967 – The academic school named after Pat Matthews was founded.
- 1970–1975 – The hospital was the national center for organ transplants, under the leadership of Dr. Erwin Ya'akov, the manager of the surgery division.
- 1980 – The modern building for patients was populated. It continues to serve the majority of units at the hospital.

== Buildings ==
The hospital complex includes the following buildings:

- The main building was designed by the architect Ilya Belzitzman and was dedicated in 1980.
- Laboratories and institutes building was designed by the architect Alex Shohet.
- Inpatient B building opened in 2010
- Birthing Center

== Diverse population and staff ==
A diverse group of doctors and nurses works at the Hillel Yaffe Medical Center: Arabs and Jews, natives and immigrants. The patients also reflect the diversity of the region's population: urban people alongside rural farmers, natives and immigrants, Jews and Arabs. The hospital thus serves as an example of peaceful coexistence between Arabs and Jews, and of absorbing immigrants from the Soviet Union, Ethiopia and other lands.

== Divisions and units ==
Urology; Orthopedics 1; Orthopedics 2; Endocrinology and diabetes; Ear, nose and throat; Day hospitalization; The unit for fertility and assisted reproductive technology; Anesthesia and operating rooms; General intensive care; Cardiac intensive care	General pediatrics; Neonatology; Plastic surgery; Surgery 1; Surgery 2; Pediatric surgery; Vascular surgery; Emergency department; Neurology	Gynecology and obstetrics; Ophthalmology; Internal medicine 1; Internal medicine 2; Internal medicine 3; Psychiatry; Cardiac catheterization; Rehabilitation

== Institutes ==
- Gastroenterology and hepatology
- Pediatric development and rehabilitation
- Nephrology and high blood pressure
- Radiology
- Cardiology
- Pathology
- Sexual health
- Hematology
- Dermatology
- Holistic (alternative) medicine
- Mental health
