= Shlomo Maital =

Canadian educator (born 1942)

- שלמה מי-טל
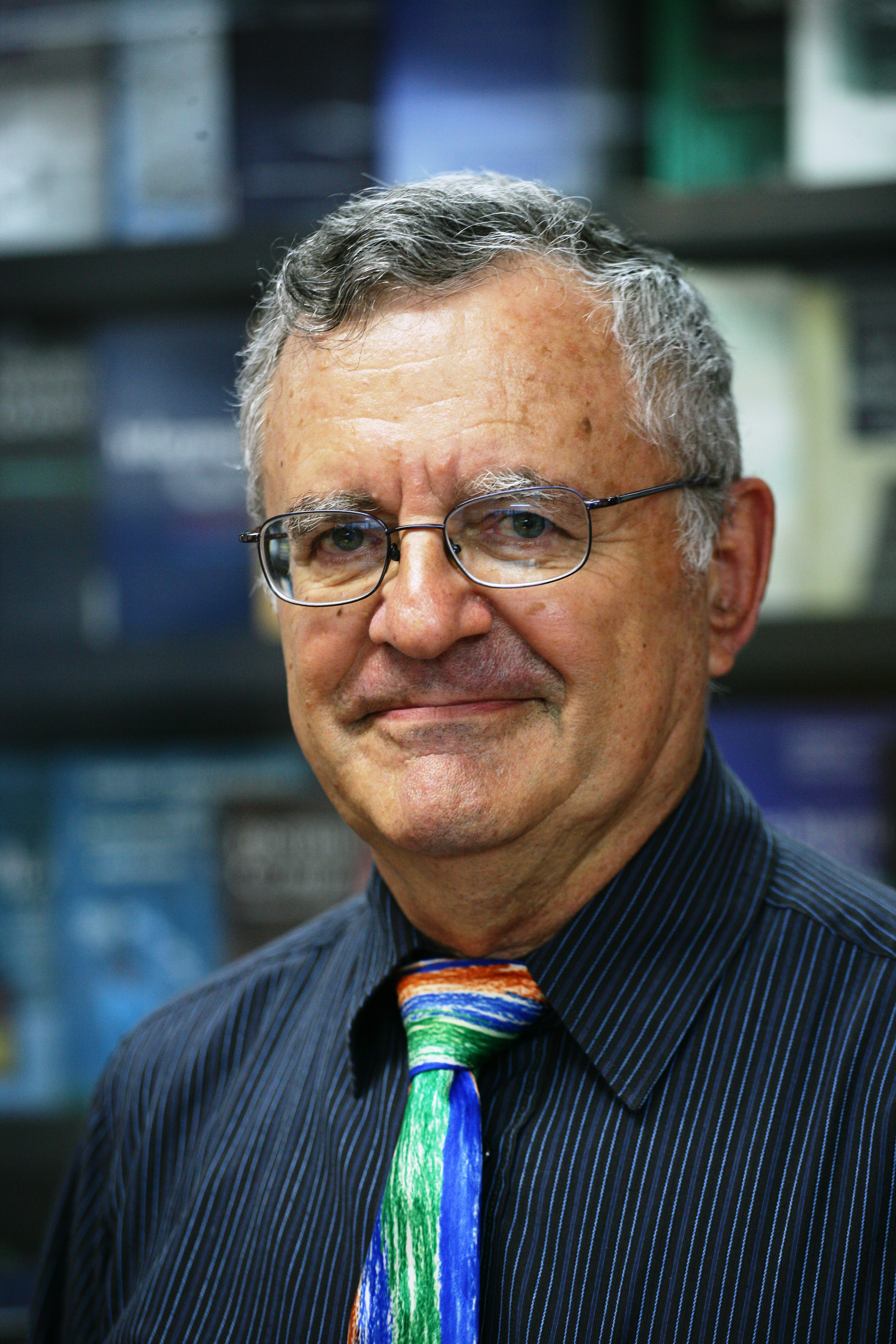
- Born: Canada
- Education: Queen’s University, Kingston, Ontario, University of Manchester, Princeton University
- Scientific career
- Fields: Behavioral Economics, Global Macroeconomics, Creativity and Entrepreneurship, Innovation

Shlomo Maital (Hebrew: שלמה מי-טל; born Richard Alan Malt on 10 November 1942) is a professor emeritus at Technion – Israel Institute of Technology and senior research fellow at the S. Neaman Institute for National Policy Research, Technion. From 1995 until 2003 he held the Sondheimer Chair in Economics in the Davidson Faculty of Industrial Engineering & Management at Technion.

His research work focuses on Behavioral Economics, Global Macroeconomics, Creativity and Entrepreneurship and Innovation.

== Early life and education ==
Maital was born in Milestone, Saskatchewan, Canada, where his father ran a General Store and his mother was a housekeeper. His family moved to Regina, Saskatchewan, in 1947, and he attended Davin School and Central Collegiate; he was valedictorian. He won a General Motors scholarship for study at Queen’s University, Kingston, Ontario, where he did B.A. (Hon.) and M.A. degrees in Economics in 1964. After winning a Commonwealth Scholarship, he studied for the M.Econ. degree at the University of Manchester, UK, and then did his Ph.D. in Economics at Princeton University, graduating in 1967. After marrying Sharone Levow, a student at Douglass College, together they emigrated to Israel in July 1967, where he was appointed Lecturer in Economics at Tel Aviv University.

== Academic career ==
Maital was Lecturer, Senior Lecturer and Associate Professor at Tel Aviv University from 1967 through 1979. In 1979, he became Associate Professor in the Davidson Faculty of Industrial Engineering & Management, Technion. In 1995 he was awarded the Sondheimer Chair in Economics; in 2003 he became Prof. emeritus (retired).

In 1998, he was appointed Academic Director of TIM-Technion Institute of Management, a position he held until 2009, when TIM was officially closed. From 1984 through 2003, for twenty years, Maital was a Visiting Professor in the Management of Technology and Sloan Fellows programs at MIT Sloan School of Management, during the summer months.

== Government appointments ==
During 1987-88, on leave from Technion, Maital served as Director of the National and Economic Planning Authority, Ministry of Economics and Planning of the Government of Israel.

== Research ==
Together with his wife Sharone, Maital began research in behavioral economics in the early ’70s. Their first published paper was “Time preference, delay of gratification and the intergenerational transmission of economic inequality” (1978). His book "Minds Markets & Money: Psychological Foundations of Economic Behavior" was published by Basic Books in 1982. It was followed by "Economic Games People Play" (Basic Books, 1985), co-authored by Sharone L. Maital.

He wrote and/or co-authored 15 books, edited and/or co-edited six more books and published some 80 articles in refereed journals.

== Professional experience ==
In the early 1980s, Maital, together with Ben Gilad, decided to launch SABE – Society for Advancement of Behavioral Economics – at the Allied Social Sciences Association meetings in New York City in December 1982. Maital is an Honorable Member of SABE.

Maital taught innovation and entrepreneurship for several decades in business schools all over the world, including those in Germany, France, U.S., South Africa, Singapore and China.

== Media ==
Maital has written a regular column in the English-language fortnightly magazine Jerusalem Report since 2008 – over 400 columns.

He writes regularly for the Hebrew-language business daily press (Globes, Calcalist, TheMarker).

== Selected publications ==
=== Books ===
- Cracking the Creativity Code: Zoom in/Zoom out For More Creativity, Fun and Success (co-authored by Arie Ruttenberg); also published in Mandarin as The Imagination Elevator (SAGE Publications, 2014).
- Executive Economics: Ten Essential Tools for Managers (Free Press, NY, 1994); translated into Russian, Italian, Portuguese, Spanish, Hebrew and Korean.

=== Articles ===
- A simulation study of tax evasion, Journal of Public Economics, 10, 1978 (with N. Friedland and A. Ruttenberg).
- What do economists know? An empirical study of experts' expectations, Econometrica, 2, 1981, 91-504 (with Bryan W. Brown).
- Empirical Estimates and Partitioning of X-Inefficiency: A Data Envelopment Approach. American Economic Association, Papers and Proceedings, May 1992 (with Harvey Leibenstein).
- Time preference, delay of gratification and the intergenerational transmission of economic inequality. In Orley Ashenfelter and Wallace Oates, editors, Essays in Labor Market Analysis, (Halsted Press/John Wiley & Sons, New York: 1978, 179-199) (with Sharone L. Maital).

== Personal life ==
Maital is married to Dr. Sharone Levow Maital, who served as a school psychologist in Israel for 40 years. They have four children and live in Zichron Yaakov.
