= Tabachnik =

Tabachnik or Tabachnyk (Cyrillic: Табачник) is a gender-neutral Slavic surname meaning either a smoker or tobacco merchant. It may refer to

- Anne Tabachnick (1927–1995), American painter
- Dmytro Tabachnyk (born 1963), former Ukrainian politician
- Eldred Tabachnik (born 1943), South African barrister
- Jan Tabachnyk (born 1945), Ukrainian composer, accordionist, politician and entrepreneur
- Josef Tabachnyk (born 1947), Ukrainian-born sculptor
- Michel Tabachnik (born 1942), Swiss musician
- Pablo Tabachnik (born 1977), Argentinian table tennis player

== See also ==
- Tabachnik Garden, Jerusalem, Israel
