= Hillel Yaffe =

Russian physician and Zionist leader

- הלל יפה
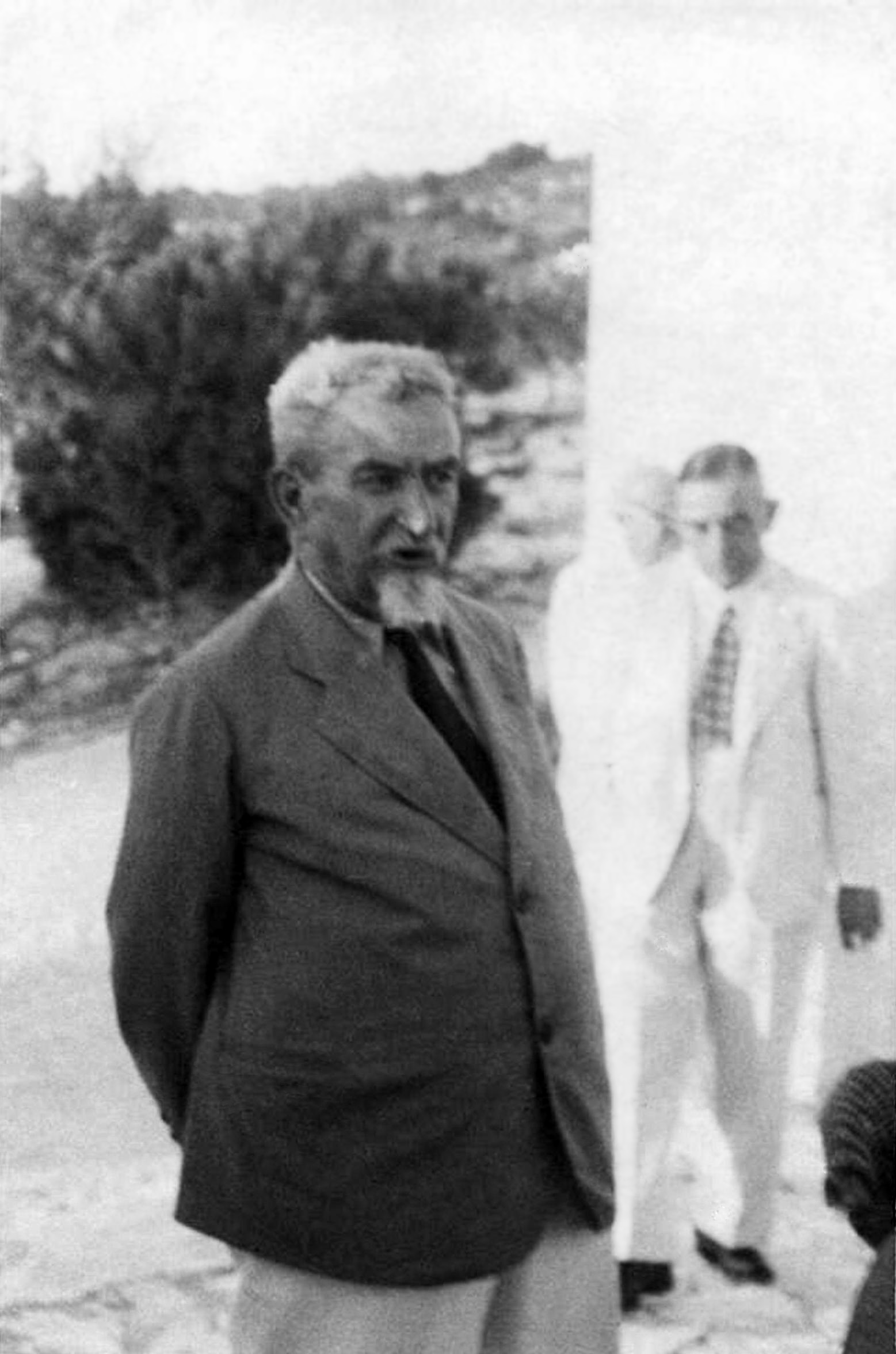
- Hillel Yaffe
- Born: 1864; Ukraine, Russian Empire
- Died: 1936 (aged 71–72); Haifa, Mandatory Palestine
- Occupations: Physician, Zionist leader
- Known for: Curing malaria, improving medical infrastructure in the Yishuv
- Spouse: Rivka Glickstein
- Children: Yirmeyahu, Sarah, Ya'akov
- Medical career
- Institutions: Hillel Yaffe Medical Center
- Notable works: Eradication of malaria in Palestine

Hillel Yaffe (Hebrew: הלל יפה; 1864–1936) was a Russian Jewish physician and Zionist leader who immigrated to the Land of Israel in the First Aliyah during the Ottoman Empire. In the early 20th century he was instrumental in curing malaria, which at that time was the main cause for death of Jews, and helped improve the medical infrastructure of the Yishuv during the same period. The Hillel Yaffe Medical Center in Hadera is named after him.

== Biography ==
Hillel Yaffe was born in 1864 in a small village in Ukraine called Capwelya. His father was a wealthy merchant who provided his son with a traditional Jewish education. When he grew up, Yaffe was sent to learn in a secondary school. These studies encouraged him to study medicine and brought him close to the Zionist movement. When he finished secondary school, he traveled to Geneva, where he studied medicine. Afterward he specialized in eye care in Paris. He began to publish laboratory work in his field of expertise, and his research was highly regarded in the scientific community. Yaffe's decision to specialize in medicine, particularly in eye care, derived from his dream to become a doctor in the Land of Israel. In 1891, he traveled to Turkey, the seat of the Ottoman Empire, where he received a license to practice medicine. From there, he sailed to Jaffa.

Yaffe married Rivka Glickstein in 1898. She was the sister of Esther Glickstein, who would later marry Haim Margaliot-Kalvarisky. Before they met, Rivka had studied with Yaffe's sister in France. The couple had three children: Yirmeyahu, Sarah and Ya'akov. Yirmeyahu served as a captain in the Jewish Brigade, and after World War I he earned a doctorate in chemistry. Sarah studied agriculture in England and married Joseph Bentwich, who earned the Israel Prize for education in 1962. Ya'akov, who learned medicine and specialized in tropical diseases, lived in Jerusalem as of 2007. His nephew, Yigael Gluckstein who wrote under the name Tony Cliff, was a Palestinian Jewish Trotskyist and the founder of the British Socialist Workers Party.

=== Medical career ===
After traveling around the country, Yaffe settled in Tiberias. He worked as a doctor there for two years (1891–1893) and then moved to Zikhron Ya'akov. He was noted especially for his dedicated work for the people of Hadera, who were suffering from malaria. He visited the moshava of Hadera at least twice a week and succeeded in healing some of the men, but the mortality rate remained high. Slowly it became apparent that a fundamental, broad program would be necessary to remove the scourge of malaria from the Jewish settlement, since individual treatment was insufficient. In 1895, two years after he became the doctor of Zikhron Ya'akov, Yaffe received a nomination to become the representative of Hovevei Zion in Israel.

=== Zionist leadership ===
Yaffe's decision to combine medicine with political activism derived from his realization that in order to fulfill his mission for the Jewish settlement in Israel, it was necessary to form new institutions. Yaffe understood that in order to succeed in eradicating malaria, he needed to combine practical treatment of patients with research, community activism, and politics. When Yaffe accepted this job, he moved to Jaffa, which was a central city, and managed to raise money to drain the infested swamp near Hadera. He traveled to Europe to raise money for various purposes such as saving the first Hebrew school, which was on the verge of financial collapse.

Yaffe became a noted authority on malaria, its prevention and its cure. He published many articles and even lectured in Paris in an international conference on malaria in 1900. He worked to improve public health and studied other illnesses which had spread throughout the region, with an emphasis on prevention and minimizing contagious spreading of diseases. In 1902, an epidemic of cholera spread through Israel. Yaffe was appointed by the Turkish government to combat the epidemic. He decided that people were forbidden to leave their communities, and that it was forbidden to enter or leave the house of a sick person, in order to stop the illness from spreading. The epidemic was stopped.

In 1903 Yaffe participated in a delegation of the Zionist movement to investigate the El-Arish region, a prospective location for a Jewish state suggested by Theodor Herzl at the Zionist Congress. In the same year, representatives of Zikhron Ya'akov gathered and established the General Union and Teachers' Union of the Yishuv. Yaffe stood as their head and worked to establish the resources of the communities so that they would not need to rely on external financial support. He also worked to convince the groups who worked in education to use the Hebrew language.

In 1905, Yaffe abandoned Hovevei Zion and began to work in the Jaffa hospital. During his work he became sick with pneumonia and traveled to Europe to heal. In 1907 he returned to Israel and began to run the hospital in Zikhron Ya'akov. Yaffe's extensive knowledge of the importance of public health and the practical realities of Israel led him to build a widespread system of prevention. He trained crews of medics who could help settlers, and these crews spread throughout the land and improved the level of prevention and treatment in the population.

In 1919, he moved from Zikhron Ya'akov to Haifa, where he worked as a doctor and published articles on medicine. His articles were published in newspapers outside the country, and he was invited to international medical conferences. Yaffe continued to work until his death in 1936. He was buried, according to his wishes, in Zikhron Ya'akov.

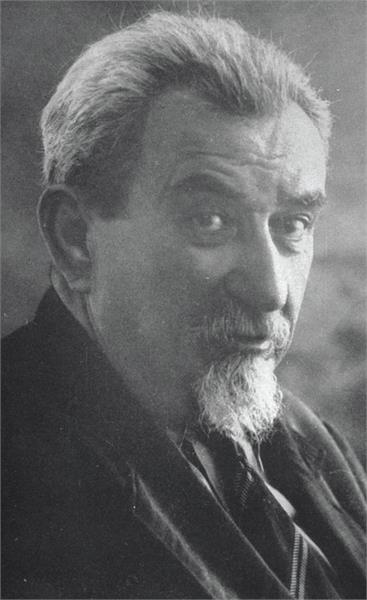
Hillel Yaffe 1931

== Involvement with NILI ==
Yaffe had minor but crucial involvement with NILI, the Jewish espionage network centered in Zichron Ya'akov which assisted the United Kingdom in its fight against the Ottoman Empire in Palestine between 1915 and 1917, during World War I. In Spies in Palestine, James Srodes quotes the diary of Yaffe as saying that Sarah Aaronsohn, after her botched suicide attempt, as she lay suffering & fearful that she would unintentionally reveal secrets to the Turks in her delirium (which she did not), pleaded with him, "For heaven's sake, put an end to my life. I beg you, kill me… I can't suffer any longer…" Instead, Yaffe administered a non-fatal dose of morphine, thus prolonging her life. She died several days later, on 9 October 1917.

== Fight against malaria ==
Yaffe's first efforts to eradicate malaria focused on drying the swamps. He used many methods, including wide use of eucalyptus trees, on the principle that the large tree would draw a lot of water from the ground. Also, manual efforts were undertaken to dry the swamps. The residents of Hadera and foreign workers from Africa (who arrived after Yaffe requested help from Baron Rothschild) began the physically demanding labor of drying the swamps using a wide network of canals, connecting the swamps to the Hadera Stream. Another approach taken by Yaffe was research. Yaffe left for Europe and learned novel theories about malaria. Among these studies was one that suggested that mosquitoes from the genus Anopheles, which were prevalent in swamps, were carriers of the disease. He began to plead with farmers to hang canopies around the beds, nets around the windows, and to clean every pool of standing water. Likewise, Yaffe convinced Baron Rothschild to send men to kill the mosquitoes. Afterward the incidence of malaria decreased, and efforts to dry the swamps continued with greater force. Forestation of large areas near Hadera with eucalyptus trees was part of Yaffe's effort to change the environment in order to respond comprehensively to the disease.

== See also ==
- Israel Jacob Kligler (1888-1944), headed the malaria eradication effort in Mandatory Palestine
- Gideon Mer (1894–1961), malariologist in Mandatory Palestine
- Healthcare in Israel
