= Chaim Dov Kantor =

Rabbi Chaim Dov Kantor (1865–1944) (Hebrew: הרב חיים דוב קנטור) was born in Pinsk to his father R. Shlomo, the town cantor. The family was descended from Rabbi Chaim of Volozhin. At the age of four his father died, and Kantor's mother traveled around with her four children until she settled in Jerusalem in 1871.

Chaim Dov studied at the Talmud Torah in the courtyard of the Hurva Synagogue in Jerusalem's Old City, and later at the renowned Etz Chaim Yeshiva. He married Esther Spektor (d. 1928 or 1931; a niece of Yitzchak Elchanan Spektor) and they were among the founders of the Shfeya settlement in 1887, adjacent to Zichron Yaakov, where he served as a rabbi. Following World War I Kantor became a leading figure in the Mizrachi Religious Zionist movement and was an active leader in Jewish life in Palestine. He was a shochet (ritual slaughterer) and mohel (circumciser). His main income was derived as the kosher supervisor of the Zichron Yaakov winery. At the end of his life he relocated to Jerusalem and is buried on the Mount of Olives.

Kantor appears as the character Reb Chaim Dov in Shmuel Yosef Agnon's fictionalized travelogue HaGalilah (in English as "To the Galilee"), published in his posthumous volume Pithei Devarim.

== Bibliography ==
- David Tidhar (ed.), Encyclopedia of the Founders and Builders of Israel (vol. 2, pp. 588–589).
