= Ari Shavit =

Israeli journalist

- ארי שביט
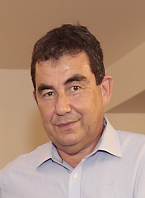
- Born: 26 November 1957 (age 68); Rehovot, Israel
- Education: Hebrew University of Jerusalem
- Occupations: Writer; journalist
- Known for: Columnist at Haaretz; Author of the award-winning 2013 book My Promised Land
- Relatives: Joseph Bentwich (grandfather); Herbert Bentwich (great-grandfather); Norman Bentwich (great-uncle); Helen Bentwich (great-aunt); Solomon Joseph Solomon (great-great-uncle)

Ari Shavit (Hebrew: ארי שביט; born 16 November 1957) is an Israeli reporter and writer. Shavit was a senior correspondent at the left-of-center Israeli newspaper Haaretz before he resigned when a pattern of sexual misconduct came to public attention. From 2019 to 2026, was a weekly columnist for Makor Rishon, an Israeli newspaper. Shavit was the chairman of the nonprofit Association for Civil Rights in Israel.

A self-described left-wing journalist and anti-occupation peacenik, Shavit is the author of the 2013 New York Times Best Seller My Promised Land: The Triumph and Tragedy of Israel.

== Biography ==
Shavit was born in Rehovot, Israel, and studied at the Hebrew University in Jerusalem. His father was a scientist and his mother was an artist. Some of his ancestors were early leading Zionists.

Shavit was drafted into the Israel Defense Forces in 1975. He volunteered as a paratrooper in the Paratroopers Brigade. He served as a squad leader and took part in various raids against armed Palestinian organizations and camps in Lebanon, including Operation Litani.

== Career ==
Known for his left-wing journalism, Shavit was a columnist for Haaretz from 1995. His work has also appeared in The New Yorker, The New York Times, and Politico.

Shavit described himself as an "antioccupation peacenik". He was particularly critical of right-wing Israeli politicians, such as Avigdor Lieberman, who he argued is only loyal to Russia and to Putin. Shavit was also critical of Miri Regev, describing her as 'anti-culture', and of Ayelet Shaked, describing her as 'anti-democracy'.

He has for many years been a critic of Benjamin Netanyahu. Although admitting that Netanyahu is highly intelligent, Shavit argued that Netanyahu "scorns [US] Democrat politicians and liberal intellectuals... as weaklings." Shavit also castigated Netanyahu for not being "a civil leader who truly cares for the welfare of his citizens. He [Netanyahu] is unconcerned by social justice."

In 2013, Shavit released My Promised Land: The Triumph and Tragedy of Israel. It was a New York Times Best Seller and received widespread acclaim. The New York Times listed My Promised Land in its "100 Notable Books of 2013", The Economist named it as one of the best books of 2013, it received the Gerrard and Ella Berman Memorial Award in History from the Jewish Book Council, and it won the Natan Book Award. In September 2014, Shavit traveled to Cleveland, Ohio to accept the Anisfield-Wolf Book Award in nonfiction for My Promised Land, and delivered a talk at the Cleveland City Club about the necessity of American leadership in the Middle East. The book received many positive reviews, as well as criticism from both the left, including from Norman Finkelstein, and from the right, including from Martin Kramer.

=== Resignation ===
In 2016, charges of sexual misconduct involving groping of women in the workplace surfaced, forcing Shavit to apologize and resign from his positions at Haaretz and Channel 10.

Shavit was temporarily suspended from the Haaretz newspaper after he was accused of sexual harassment by American-Jewish journalist Danielle Berrin ('Hollywood Jew'), who wrote a cover story on the subject in the Los Angeles Jewish Journal. Shavit, initially claimed the incident was merely flirting, saying "I apologize from the bottom of my heart for this misunderstanding. I did not mean to say anything unwelcome to Berrin". In response, Shelly Yachimovich wrote: "I don't know if Berrin accepted his apology, but I didn't... It's not like he accidentally stepped on somebody's toe." In response to the allegations, Shavit announced that he was taking time off from his journalism.

A member of the staff of the Jewish organization J Street then stepped forward to say that while she was arranging speaking engagements for Shavit he had caressed her hand and propositioned her with the suggestion that they go out for drinks. Shavit then resigned.

== Resumption of Activities ==
In spring 2021, Shavits' third book, The Third Home: From a People of Tribes to a People, was published by Yedioth Books. In the book, Shavit argues for the importance of the state-centered approach, associated with David Ben Gurion, and contends that Israeli society has fragmented into distinct "tribes", creating what he calls an Israeli "centrifuge" that is pulling society apart and weakening the state. Shavit proposes a framework for developing a new form of state-centered approach that, in his view, is suited to the values and needs of the 21st century.

== Bibliography ==
=== Books ===
- Shavit, Ari (2013). My promised land : the triumph and tragedy of Israel. Random House.

=== Essays and reporting ===
- Shavit, Ari (21 October 2013). "Lydda, 1948 : a city, a massacre, and the Middle East today". Dept. of History. The New Yorker. Vol. 89, no. 33. pp. 40–46.

=== Critical studies and reviews of Shavit's work ===
- Garner, Dwight (19 November 2013). "Son of Israel, Caught in the Middle". The New York Times. "In the end, he plaintively says: "I wonder how long we can maintain our miraculous survival story. One more generation? Two? Three? Eventually the hand holding the sword must loosen its grip. Eventually the sword itself will rust. No nation can face the world surrounding it for over a hundred years with a jutting spear.""
- Wieseltier, Leon (21 November 2013). "The State of Israel". The New York Times. "It is one of the achievements of Ari Shavit's important and powerful book to recover the feeling of Israel's facticity and to revel in it, to restore the grandeur of the simple fact in full view of the complicated facts."
- Fischer, Elli (January 2014). "Israel for Me, Not for Thee". Commentary. "Shavit and the secular, social-democratic Ashkenazic tribe that created the state in their image and dominated the first three decades of its existence must be allowed to lament the loss of their Israel.."
- Tim, Holmes (29 May 2014). "Ari Shavit's Resuscitation of Liberal Zionism is Doomed". New Left Project. Archived from the original on 23 December 2017. "...one of Shavit's principal tasks is to defend ethnic cleansing. So observes Israel-Palestine scholar and serial debunker of fraudulent history Norman Finkelstein in Old Wine, Broken Bottle: Ari Shavit's Promised Land, a slim volume that takes Shavit's book apart. Inevitably failing to stake out any serious ethical justification for the Palestinian Nakba [...], Shavit instead relies on rhetorical puffery, resurrecting some of the crudest tropes of colonial-era racism."
