= Herbert Bentwich =

British Zionist leader and lawyer

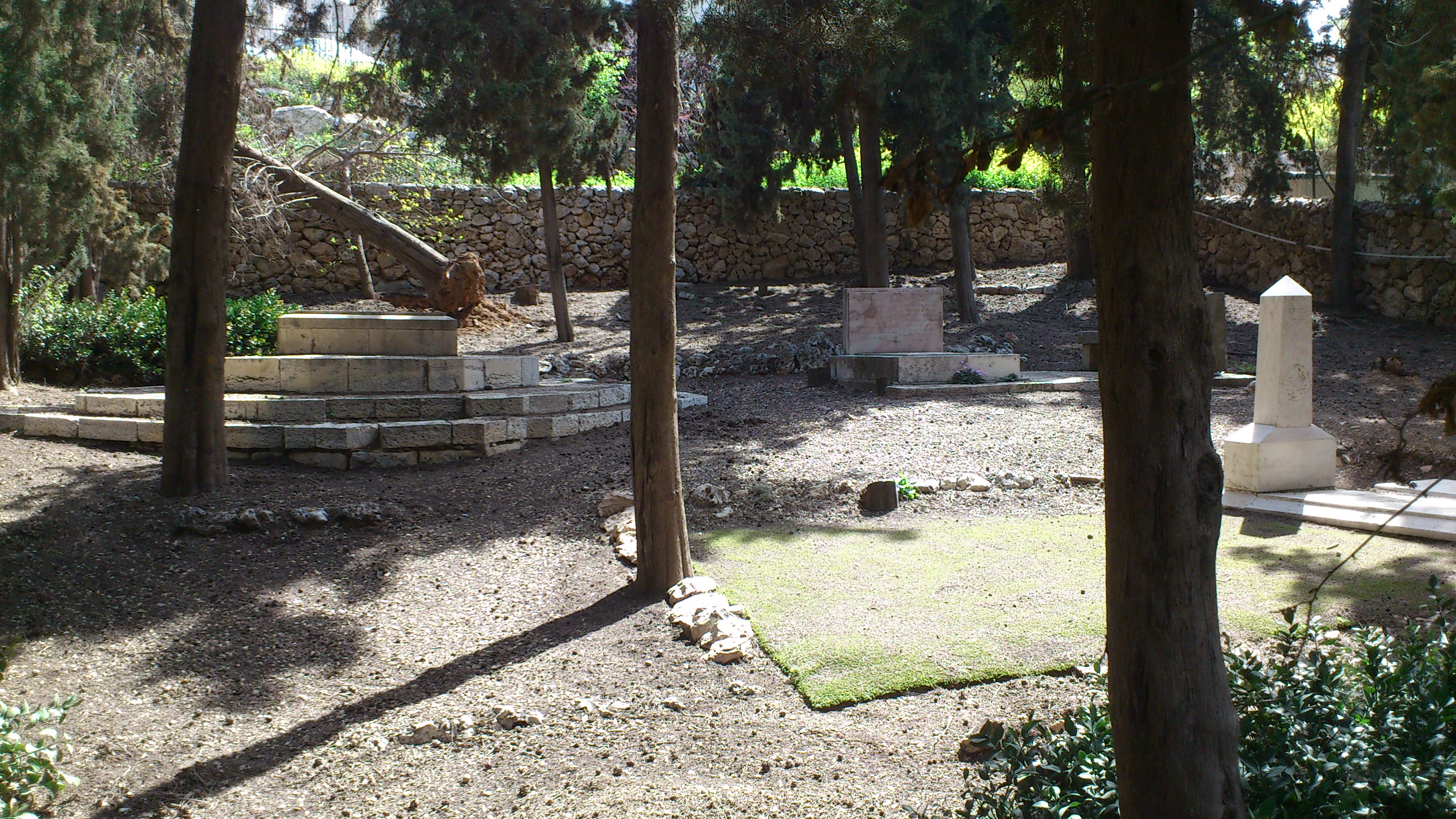
Bentwich Cemetery on Mount Scopus in Jerusalem

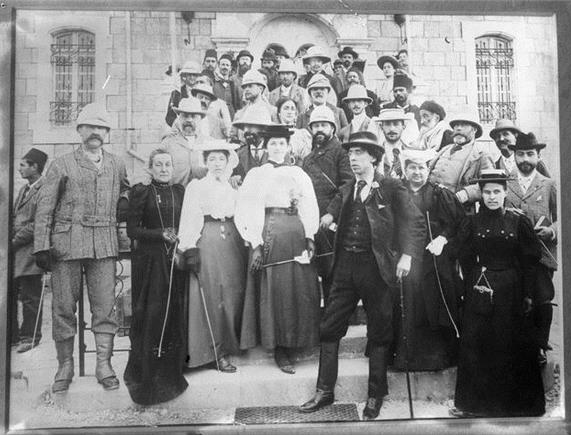
Party of English pilgrims organised by Herbert Bentwich

Herbert Bentwich (originally Bentwitch; 1856 in Whitechapel – 1932 in Jerusalem) was a British Zionist leader and lawyer.

He was an authority on copyright law, and owner/editor of the Law Journal for many years. He was a leading member of the English Hovevei Zion and one of the first followers of Theodor Herzl in England. In 1897 Bentwich led a group of 21, including the writer Israel Zangwill, on a tour of holy sites and new settlements in Palestine on behalf of the Maccabaeans, and in 1911 he acquired land for settlement at Gezer, near Ramleh, on behalf of the Maccabean Land Company. He later succeeded his brother-in-law Solomon J. Solomon as president of the Maccabaeans.

Bentwich was a founder of the British Zionist Federation in 1899 and for some time served as its vice-chairman. He was a legal adviser for the Jewish Colonial Trust. From 1916 to 1918 he served on the Zionist political advisory committee under Chaim Weizmann. Bentwich was a regular visitor to Palestine after 1921 and settled in Jerusalem in late 1929.

Susannah Bentwich had died in London in 1915, and Herbert died at his home in Rehavia on 25 June 1932. He was survived by ten of his eleven children, eight of whom eventually settled permanently in Palestine. His eldest son, Norman Bentwich, a leading barrister, also spent much of his professional life there, and another son, Joseph Bentwich, was awarded the Israel Prize for education in 1962; his daughter Thelma Yellin was a distinguished Israeli cellist (Hebrew article here). His great-grandson is Israeli journalist Ari Shavit.

== Bentwich Cemetery ==
Bentwich Cemetery is a small cemetery dedicated to Herbert Bentwich and his family and located beside the Jerusalem American Colony Cemetery in Tabachnik National Garden on Mount Scopus.
