= Tabachnik Garden =

- הגן הלאומי והאוניברסיטאי ע"ש טבצ'ניק (The Morris and Freda Tabachnik National and University Park)
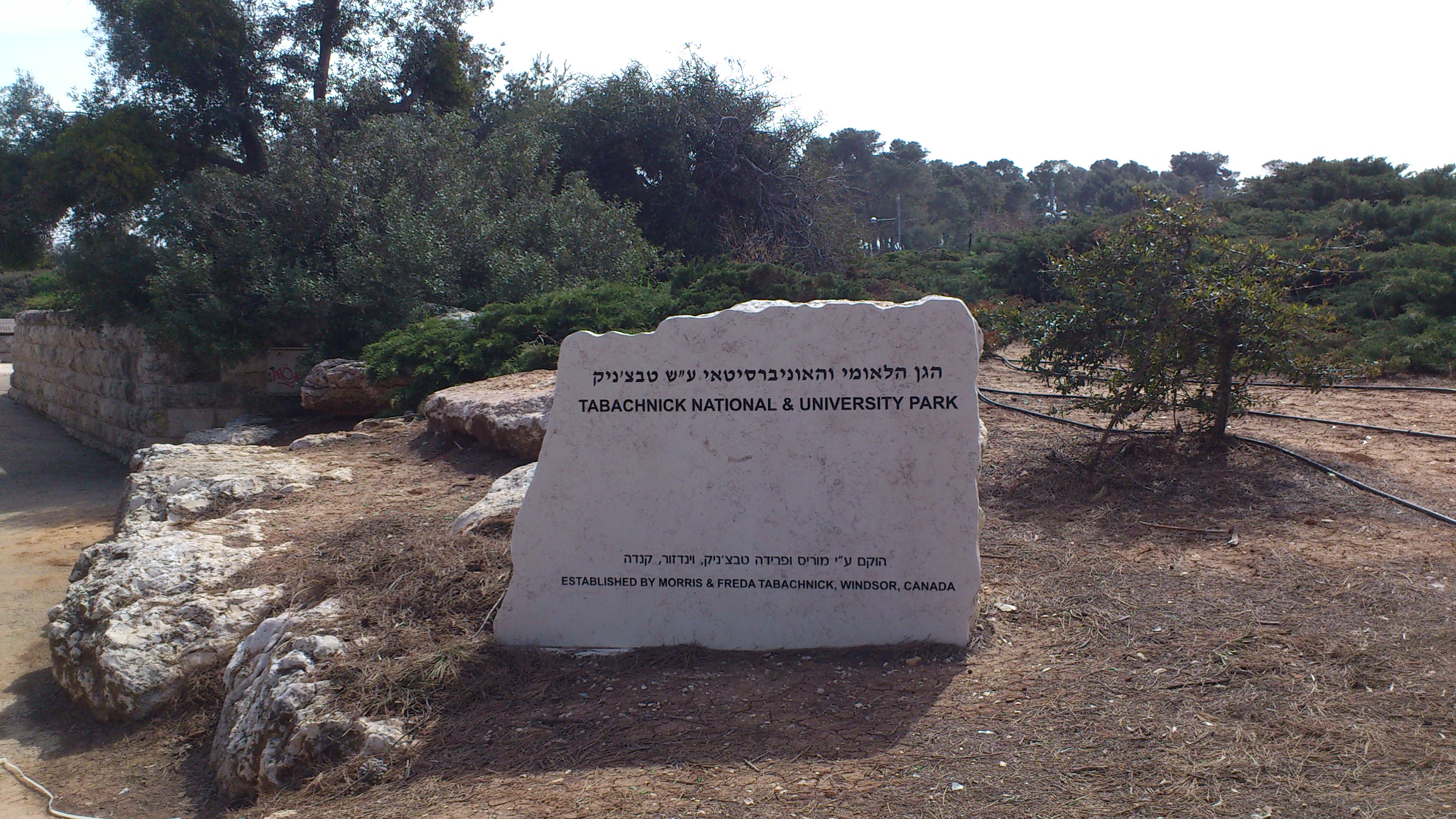

- Location within Israel
- 31°47′28.16″N 35°14′29.45″E
- Type: archaeological park
- Location: Jerusalem, Israel
- Region: Mount Scopus

Site notes
- Public access: yes

Tabachnik National Garden is a National Park located on the southern slope of Mount Scopus in Jerusalem, next to the Hebrew University. The garden preserves some Jewish burial caves from the Second Temple period and two small modern cemeteries, the American Colony Cemetery and the Bentwich Cemetery. Two lookouts are also located within the park, an eastward one facing the Dead Sea and the Judean Desert, and a westward one towards the Temple Mount.

== Jerusalem American Colony Cemetery on Mount Scopus ==
The main cemetery of the American Colony is located here. Another cemetery of the Colony is situated on Mount Zion.

== Bentwich Cemetery ==
A small cemetery beside the American Colony cemetery is dedicated to Herbert Bentwich and his family.

== Gallery ==
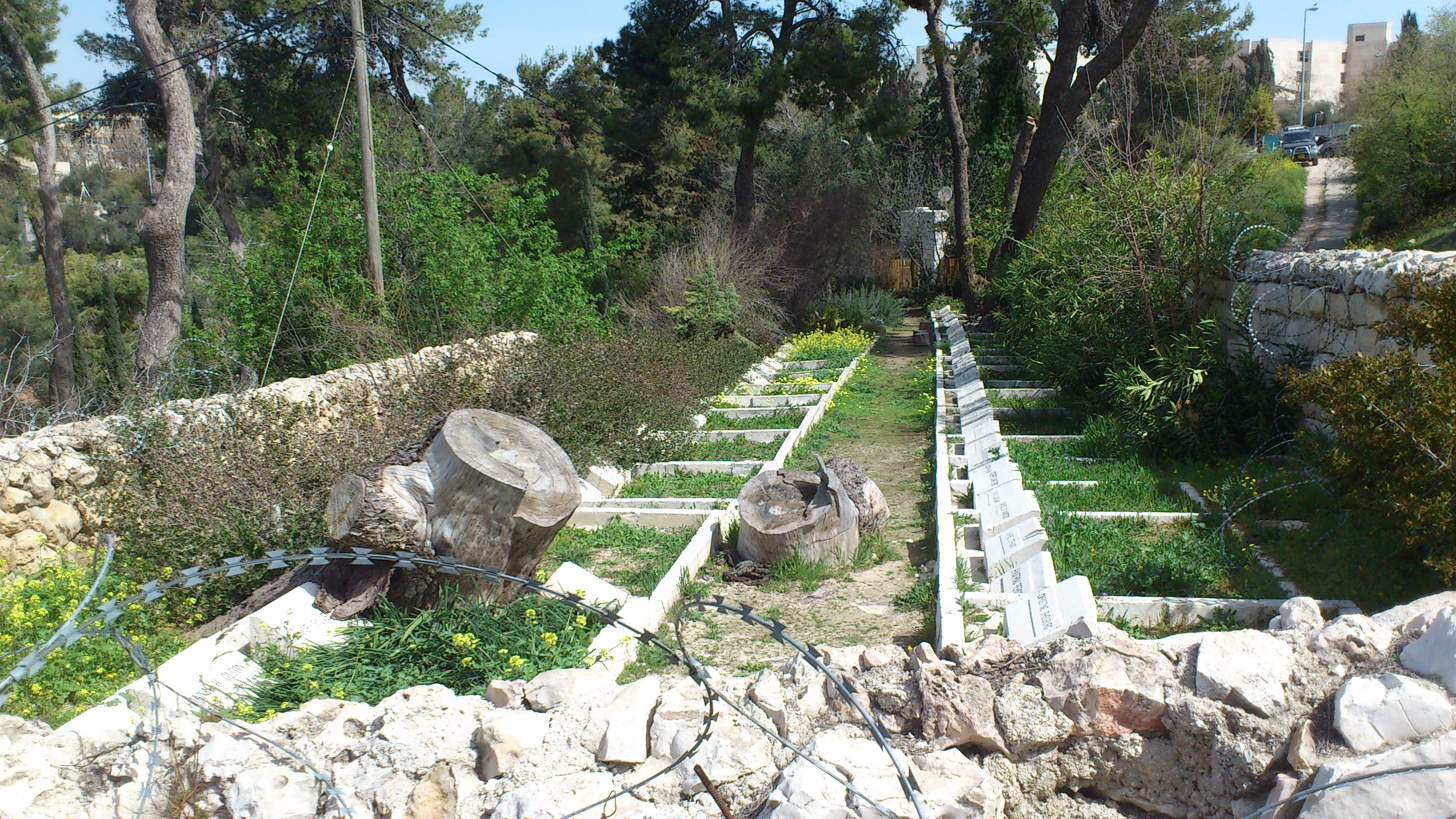
American Colony Cemetery on Mount Scopus

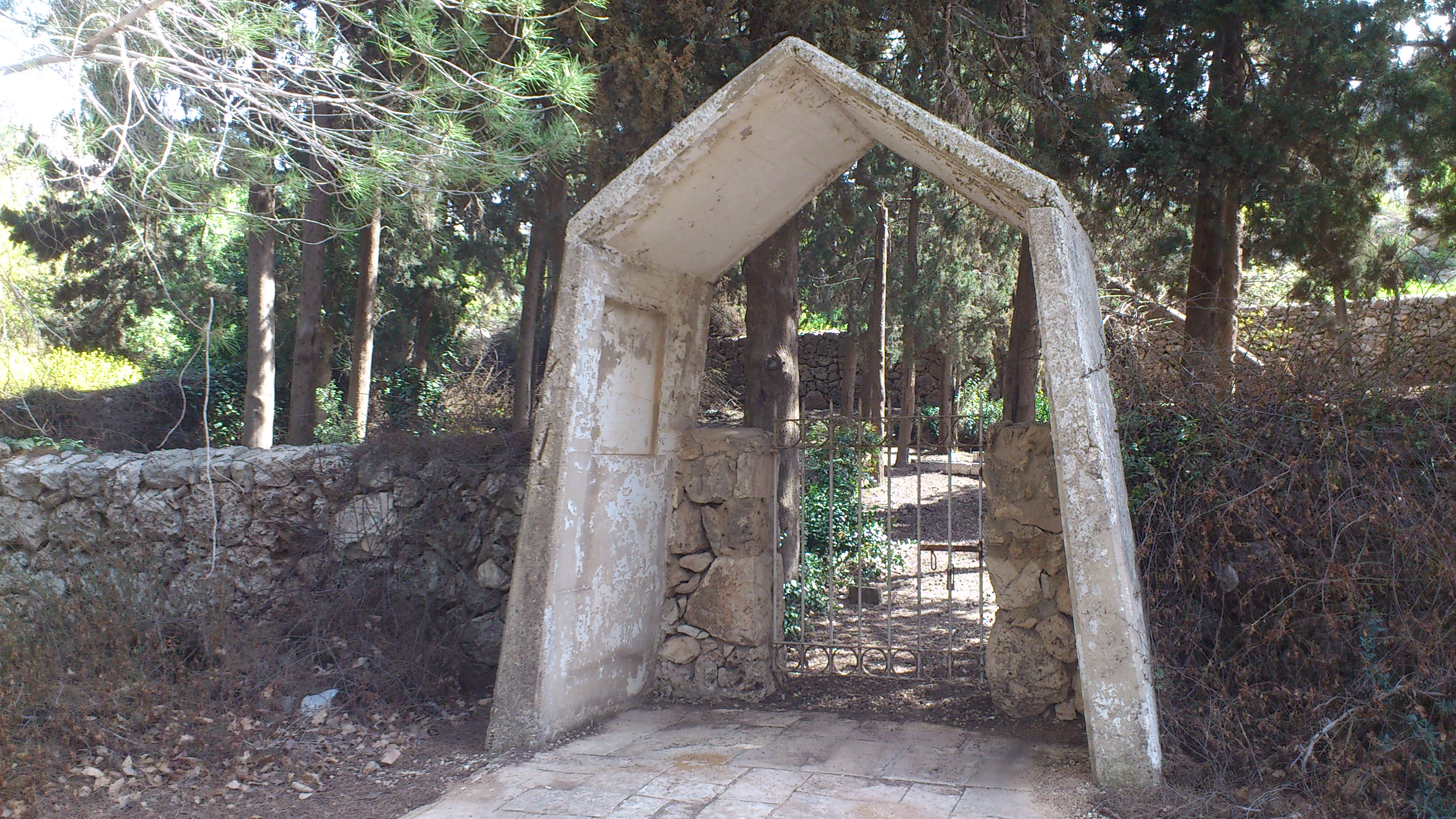
The entrance to the Bentwich Cemetery

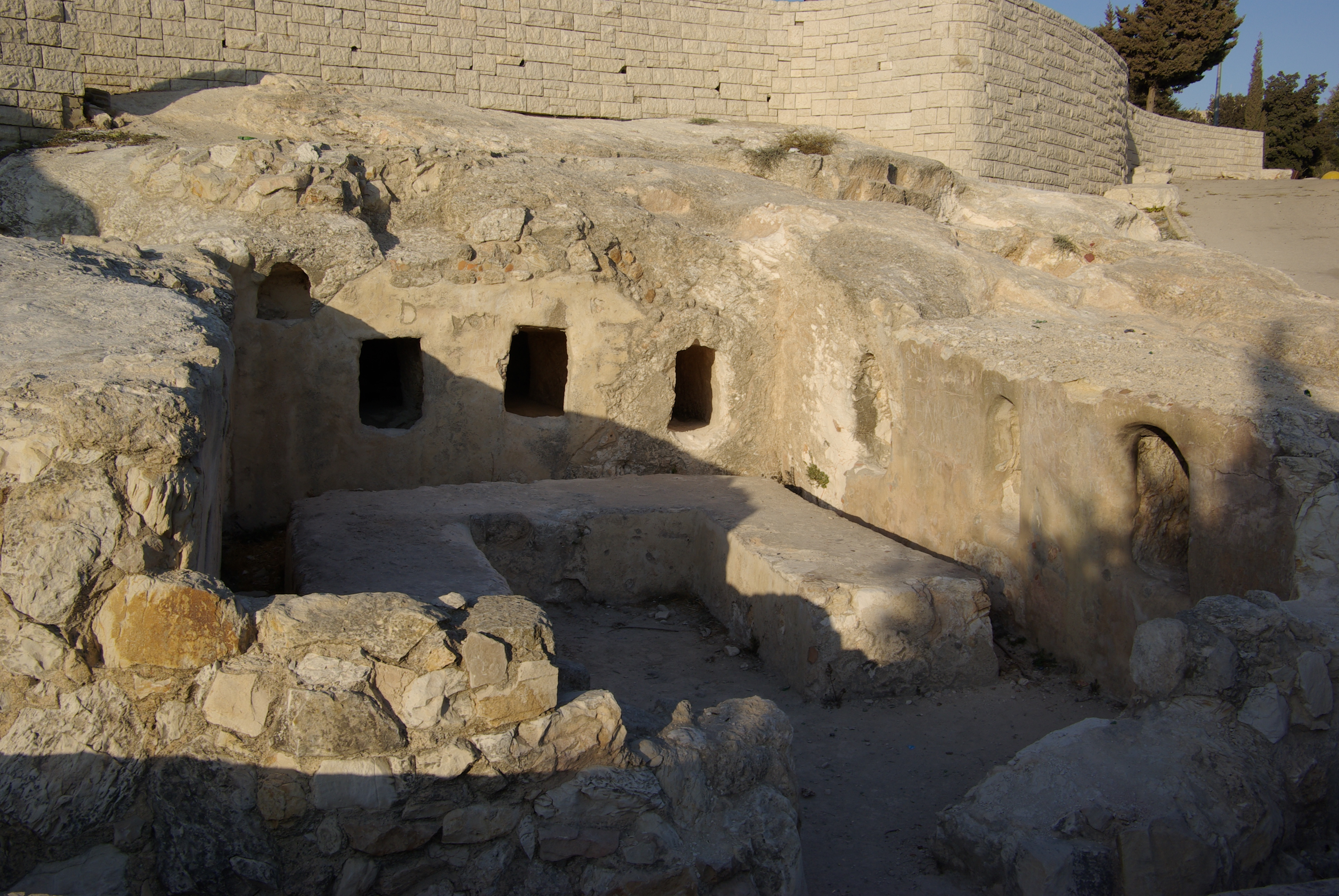
Jewish burial caves from the Second Temple period
