= The William Davidson Faculty of Industrial Engineering & Management =

Coordinates: 32°46′26.42″N 35°1′27.35″E

The Faculty of Data and Decision Sciences
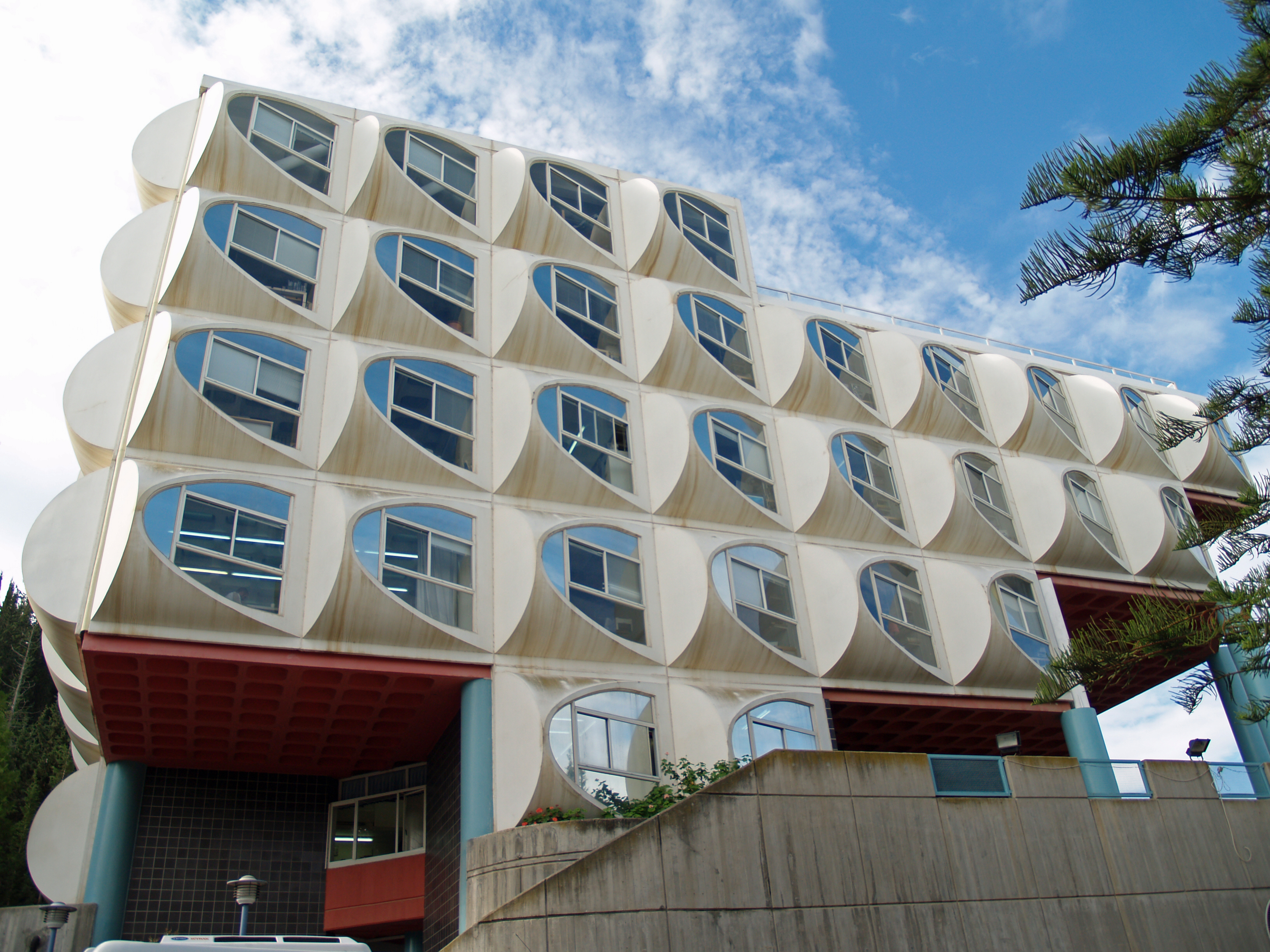
- The building housing the department on campus.
- Parent institution: Technion
- Established: 1958; 67 years ago
- Location: Haifa, Israel
- Website: dds.technion.ac.il

The Faculty of Data and Decision Sciences is an academic faculty of the Technion and the oldest such department in Israel. The department is currently headed by Prof. Rann Smorodinsky and is based in the Cooper and Bloomfield buildings at Technion City. The department employs 52 faculty members, who as of 2023 served a total of 500 graduate and 1000 undergraduate students.

== History ==
IE&M (Industrial Engineering & Management) was launched as a Technion academic department in 1958 and grew under the leadership of Professor Pinchas Naor, who served as founding dean. In the traditional disciplinary model, Industrial Engineering (IE) is separated from management programs taught in business schools. Naor's idea was to combine IE with management by creating a large, inherently multi-disciplinary unit covering a wide spectrum of activities, from applied engineering to mathematical modeling; from economics and behavioral sciences to operations research and statistics. He saw the potential for all these disciplines working in harmony to produce a highly skilled managerial elite for Israeli industry, as well as future researchers.

The faculty changed its name to "Faculty of Data and Decision Sciences" on January 1, 2023.

== Academics ==
=== Undergraduate degree programs ===
The faculty offers three programs of study toward the undergraduate degree.

==== Industrial engineering and management ====
Three main areas of study are offered from which each student chooses one:

- Manufacturing and Services Systems Engineering.
- Enterprise Information System Engineering. Emphasizes the aspect of information technology and its use in the varied areas of industrial engineering and management. This area of concentration trains students in the use of basic computer science tools (databases and algorithms, internet systems) and system analysis. Here too, special emphasis is put on advance subjects such as management of organizations – customer relations, electronic commerce and knowledge management.
- Economics. The planning, evaluation and marketing aspects of economics systems associated with the various areas in industrial engineering and management are explored.

==== Information systems engineering ====
Data science and engineering

=== Graduate programs ===
The Faculty of Data and Decision Sciences offers five research and two non-research graduate programs:

==== Information Management Engineering ====
The graduate program in Information Management Engineering, in designed to provide the knowledge needed by today's and tomorrow's professionals for understanding and developing intelligent and complex information systems with emphasis on the technological-engineering side. The program emphasizes research and focuses on development, implementation and evaluation of methodologies in the areas of systems and software engineering, system analysis, database, artificial intelligence, game theory, computer graphics and vision, communication and distributed systems. These research areas constitute the infrastructure for building the necessary technologies and tools for developing technologically innovation and fundamentally advanced information systems.

==== Economics and Finance ====
This program offers Master and Ph. D. degrees in Economics. It focuses on the quantitative/technological aspects of economics. The program enables the students to participate in elective courses in related areas within the faculty of Industrial Engineering and Management.

==== Operation research (OR) and System Analysis ====
This research area deals with building mathematical models of decision-making processes, development of mathematical techniques and algorithms for processing the models, and applications of the resulting techniques and algorithms in engineering, finance, management, medicine, service systems, and more.

==== Behavioral Science and Management ====
The purpose of this program is to give students advanced training in scientific theory, methodology and applications related to behavior of individuals at work, as well as social behavior in industrial systems and in formal organizations. The program deals with various aspects of integrating the human operator with engineering systems. This program has two basic options:

- Industrial Psychology (limited to students with a degree in psychology): Within this option there are two areas of specialization: Industrial and Organizational Psychology and Human-Factors Engineering. The program confers the degree os Master of Science in Behavioral and Management Sciences – Industrial Psychology.
- Labor Relations and Personnel Management: This option prepares students for both academic and practical work in function of managing human resources in an organization. The program confers the degree of Master of Science in Behavioral and Management Sciences – Industrial Relations and Manpower Administration.

==== Industrial Engineering (IE) ====
The graduate program in Industrial Engineering (IE) offers both M.Sc. and Ph. D. degrees. The program is designed to prepare both for academics and professional careers. IE covers a wide spectrum of areas and the program reflects this fact. These areas include supply chain management, project management, plant layout, operations management, material handling, and service engineering. To facilitate research in these areas, the program offers a broad theoretical background in problem-solving tools.

==== MBA ====
The Faculty of Data and Decision Sciences offers a Master of Business Administration (MBA) program.

==== ME ====
The Faculty of Data and Decision Sciences offers MASTER in Engineering (ME) in which students can specialize in various areas of study.
