= Joseph Bentwich =

British-Israeli educator (1902–1982)

- יוסף בנטוויץ
- Born: 3 February 1902; London, England
- Died: 1982 (aged 79 or 80); Israel
- Citizenship: Israeli, British
- Education: University of Cambridge; London University
- Occupation: Educator
- Spouse: Sarah Yaffe (m. 1924)
- Children: 4
- Relatives: Ari Shavit (grandson)
- Writing career
- Notable awards: Israel Prize (1962)

Joseph Bentwich (Hebrew: יוסף בנטוויץ; 3 February 1902 – 1982) was a British-Israeli educator.

== Biography ==
Bentwich was born in 1902 in London, United Kingdom. His father was Herbert Bentwich, a lawyer and a leading British Zionist and his mother was Suzannah Bentwich (née Solomon). From 1920 to 1923, Bentwich studied at the University of Cambridge and, from 1923 to 1924, at an educational institute of London University.

In 1924, he settled in Mandate Palestine. Until 1928, he taught at The Herzliya Hebrew Gymnasium, in Tel Aviv, and at Hebrew Reali School, in Haifa. Bentwich was then appointed an inspector of schools for the Mandate Government, and from 1943 to 1948 was an assistant director of the Department of Education.

In 1948, following the resignation of Arthur Biram, Bentwich was appointed as his replacement as principal of the Hebrew Reali School in Haifa, a position he held until 1955. 1955 to 1958, he was a lecturer in education at the Hebrew University of Jerusalem.

Bentwich was a leader of the Amanah (Covenant) group, established to study and promote new interpretations of Judaism.

== Awards ==
- In 1962, Bentwich was awarded the Israel Prize for education.

== Printed works ==
- Education in Israel, 1965
- Yalkut ha-Datot (Anthology of Religions), editor, 1964
- Yahadut, Mikra'ah (Judaism, a Reader), editor, 1967

He also published several textbook for teaching English and mathematics.

== Family ==
Bentwich had ten siblings, seven of whom eventually settled permanently in Israel. His eldest brother, Norman Bentwich, was a leading British lawyer, who also spent much of his professional life Mandate Palestine and Israel. Another sibling was Thelma Yellin, a renowned cellist and active pioneer of the musical life of Mandate Palestine.

In 1924, Bentwich married Sarah Yaffe (the daughter of Hillel Yaffe). They had four children; one of them is Professor Zvi Bentwich, virologist and a world-renowned expert in the treatment of AIDS; another is Rachel Shavit, whose son is the journalist Ari Shavit.

== See also ==
- List of Israel Prize recipients
