= Zikhron Ya'akov =

Town in Israel

Zikhron Ya'akov זכרון יעקב
- Local council

Hebrew transcription(s)
  - ISO 259: Zichron Yaˁaqob
  - Also spelled: Zichron Ya'aqov (official); Zichron Yaakov (unofficial)
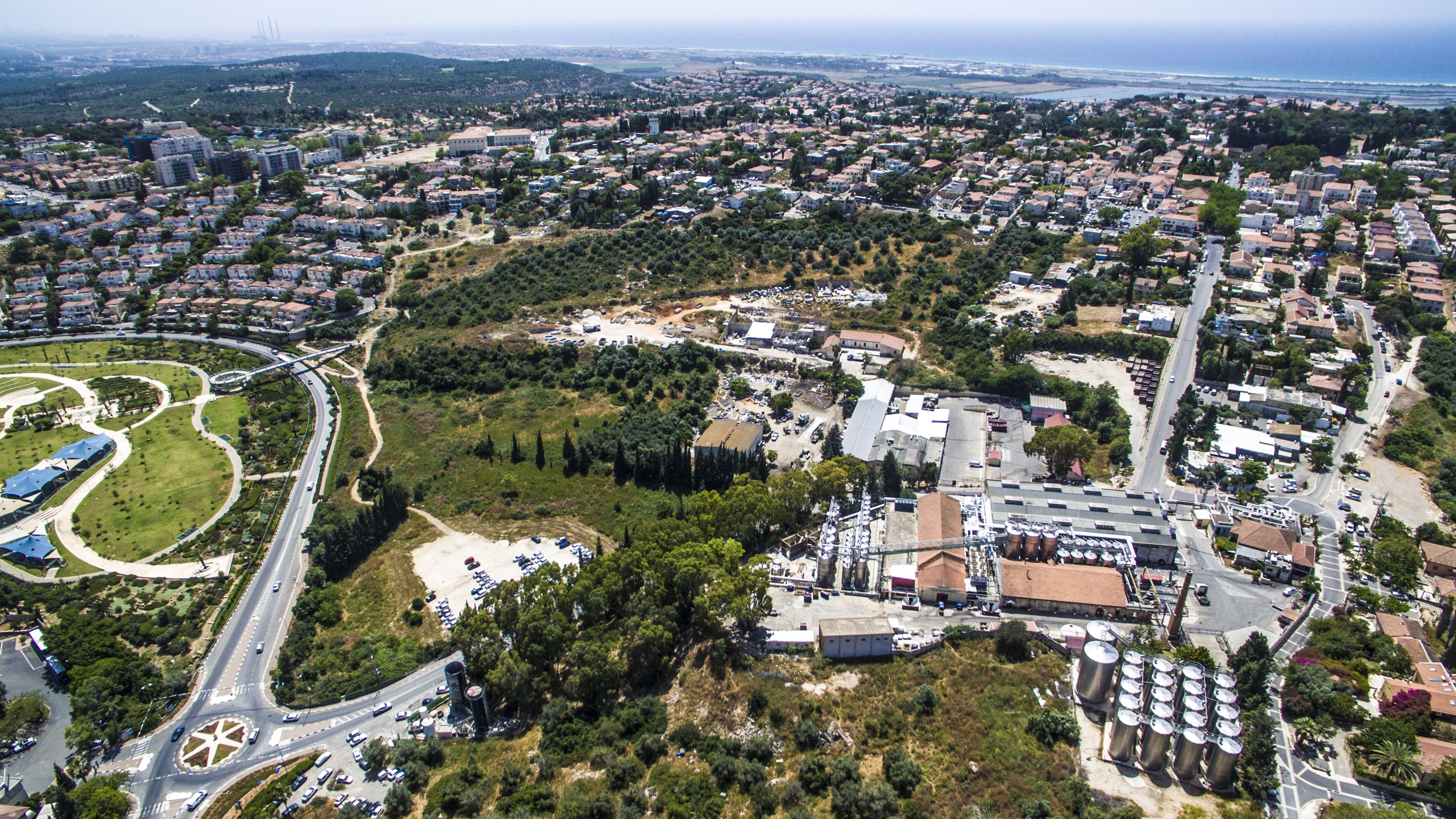
- View of Zikhron Ya'akov

- Coat of arms

- Location within Haifa region of Israel Location within Israel
- Coordinates: 32°34′15″N 34°57′06″E
- Country: Israel
- District: Haifa
- Subdistrict: Hadera
- Natural Region: Zikhron Ya'akov
- Founded: 1882; 144 years ago

Government
  - Head of Municipality: Eli Abutbul

Area
  - Total: 32.129 km^{2} (12.405 sq mi)

Population (2024)
  - Total: 24,201
  - Density: 753.24/km^{2} (1,950.9/sq mi)
- Name meaning: Jacob's Memorial
- Website: www.zy1882.co.il

Zikhron Ya'akov (Hebrew: זכרון יעקב, lit. 'Jacob's Memorial', Arabic: زخرون يعكوف) often shortened to just Zikhron, is a town in northern Israel, 35 kilometres (22 mi) south of the city of Haifa, and part of the Haifa District. It is located at the southern end of the Carmel mountain range overlooking the Mediterranean Sea, near the coastal highway (Highway 2).

It was one of the first Moshavot of Halutzim in the country, founded in 1882 by Jews from Romania, who in 1883 received support from Baron Edmond James de Rothschild and renamed their town in honor of his father, James Mayer de Rothschild ("James" being derived from the Hebrew name Ya'akov, Jacob). In 2024 it had a population of 24,201.

== History ==
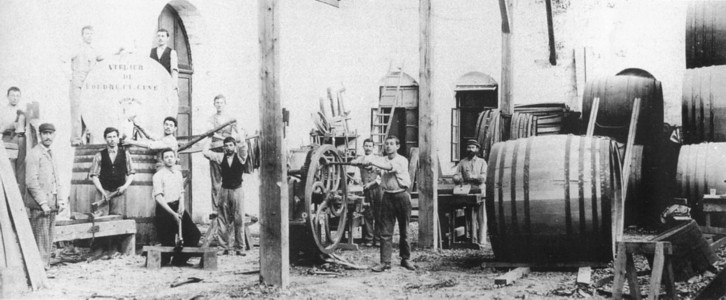
Building wine barrels, 1890s

Zikhron Ya'akov, Israel was founded in the Sanjak of Akka, Ottoman Vilayet of Damascus, in December 1882 when 100 Jewish pioneers from Romania, members of the Hibbat Zion movement, purchased two plots of land 5 km apart: 6,000 dunams in the Arab village of Zammarin (also pronounced Zummarin, Arabic: زمّارين) and 500 dunams in Tantura. The land was acquired for 46,000 francs from Frances Germain, a French citizen, of Levantine French origin who came from Aleppo Deeming the name of the place to derive from "Samaria", for a number of years the place was called Shomron in the Hebrew and Yiddish press. The families came from Moinești in Moldavia and Neamt County in Romania, and a central merit in organising the move belongs to Moses Gaster, scholar and early Zionist. The difficulty of working the rocky soil and an outbreak of malaria led many of the people to leave before the year was up.

In 1883, Baron Edmond James de Rothschild became the patron of the Moshava and drew up plans for its residential layout and agricultural economy. Zikhron was one of the first Jewish agricultural towns to come under the wing of the Baron (along with Rishon LeZion and Rosh Pinna), who renamed it in memory of his father, James (Ya'akov) Mayer de Rothschild.

To accomplish his first objective, Baron de Rothschild brought in planners who designed and allotted housing lots along the main road for the use of Moshava farmers. Each lot included a house facing the street, a long interior courtyard and a rear building for storing agricultural implements. The French-inspired architecture included tiled roofs and painted wooden windows. Each farmer was given a salary and placed under the direction of Elijah Shaid, the Baron's clerk. The Baron also commissioned the construction of the Ohel Ya'akov Synagogue, named after his father, to serve the town. Sparing no expense to build the edifice, the synagogue features a majestic ark made of white marble. The synagogue opened in 1886 and has conducted daily prayer services continuously to this day.

Following a number of economic failures, in 1885 Rothschild helped to establish the first winery in Israel, Carmel Winery, together with a bottling factory, in Zikhron Ya'akov. This was more successful economically although it was initially short-lived as in 1892 the grapevines succumbed to phylloxera, a type of parasite. After a brief set-back, American seedlings which were resistant to phylloxera were grown and the winery began to flourish. Today, the winery remains in action, as do the huge wine cellars that were carved into the mountain over a century ago.

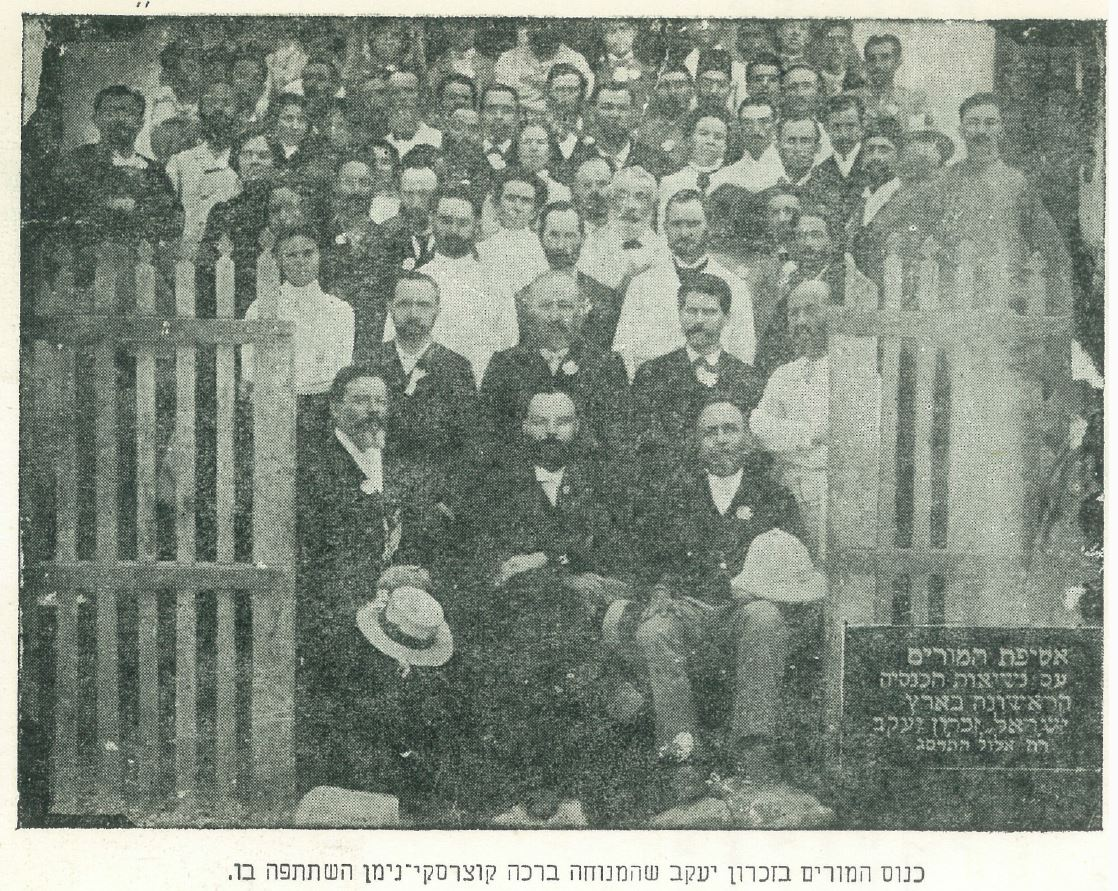
Teachers at the First Eretz Yisraeli Congress, 1903

In 1894, Jewish and Arab workers earned a wage of six piastres working in the plantations, but Jewish workers also received a supplement of four piastres from a charity fund. When Rothschild withdrew his financial support from plantations in Palestine in 1900, the subsidy was discontinued. Jewish workers were quickly replaced by Arab ones, used to being paid the lower wage.

In August 1903, the First Eretz Yisraeli Congress was assembled by Menachem Ussishkin in Zikhron Ya'akov. Complementing the World Zionist Congress, it was originally intended as an annual gathering of the leaders of the Yishuv; but it didn't get traction, so the First Congress was also the last one. The effort to coordinate the development of the Yishuv did however bear fruit in establishing the trade union of teachers, which joined Histadrut in 1950 and stays active to this day.

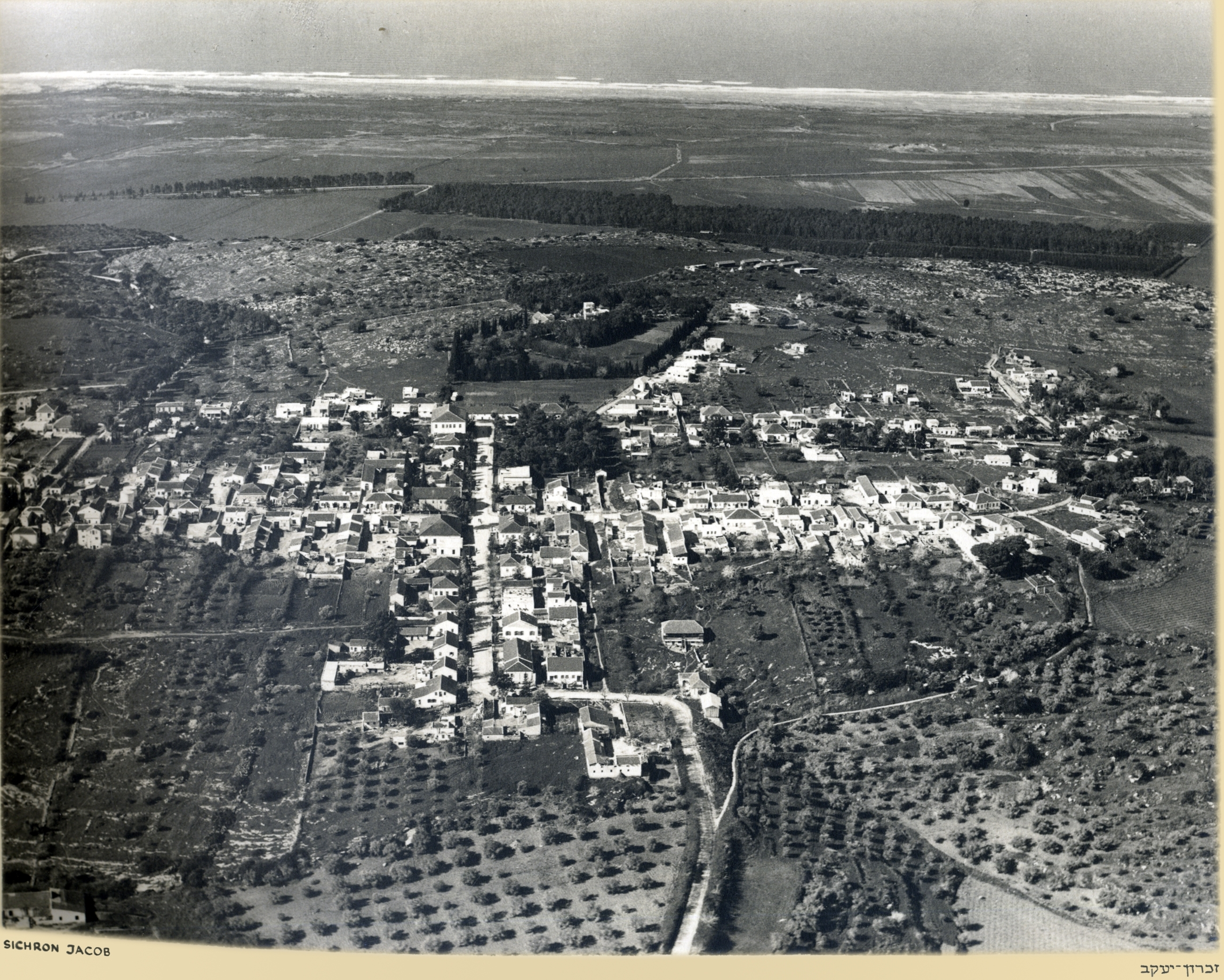
Zikhron Ya'akov in 1937

Between 1907 and 1919, Hillel Yaffe's hospital, the only Jewish hospital north of Jaffa, was located in Zichron Ya'akov; according to Hillel Yaffe's wishes, he was buried in Zikhron Ya'akov in 1936.

In 1910 David Ben-Gurion worked as a farm labourer in Zichron Ya'akov for several months. At that time he found several Arab families living in the yards of almost every farmer.

In 1927, the President of the Committee of Zichron Ya'akov was Mr. Leudermann.

In 1954, the remains of Baron Edmond de Rothschild were reinterred in Zikhron Ya'akov.

== Nili spy ring ==
Zikhron Ya'akov came to fame during World War I for the establishment of the Nili spy ring by Sarah Aaronsohn, together with her brothers, Aaron (a noted botanist) and Alex, and their friend Avshalom Feinberg.

The group volunteered to spy on Ottoman positions and report them to British agents offshore. In September 1917, the Ottomans caught one of Sarah's carrier pigeons and cracked the Nili code. In October, they surrounded Zikhron Ya'akov and arrested Sarah and several others. After four days of torture, they planned on transporting Sarah elsewhere, she requested to be taken home to change her clothes. Once home she shot herself with a pistol hidden in her bathroom and died after several days. Sarah shot herself in the throat, leaving her unable to speak, in order to avoid releasing classified information. Sarah is buried in the Zikhron Ya'akov cemetery. The Aaronsohn House–Nili Museum recreates the history of this period.

== Demographics ==
Historical population
Year	Pop.	±%
1972	4,300	—
1983	5,100	+18.6%
1995	9,500	+86.3%
2008	18,300	+92.6%
2022	23,513	+28.5%
2024	24,200	+2.9%

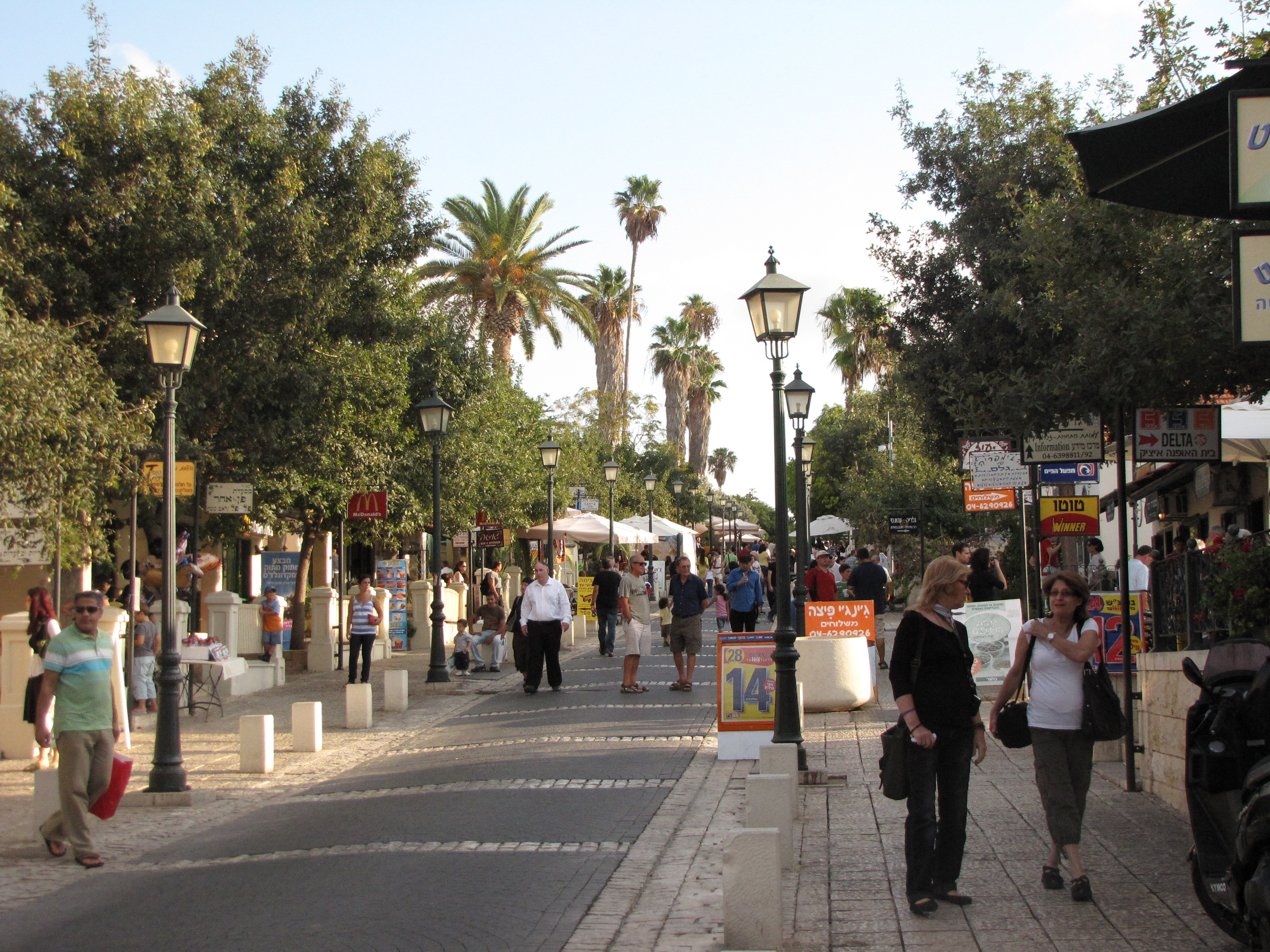
Street in Zikhron Ya'akov

In the 1922 census of Palestine conducted by the British Mandate authorities, Zikhron Ya'akov had a population of 1,302 inhabitants: 1,013 Jews, 7 Christians and 282 Muslims, where the Christians were 2 Orthodox, 3 Roman Catholics, 1 Anglican and 1 Protestant.

The population increased dramatically in the early 1950s, after the State of Israel was established. Between the 1960s and 1990s, the population remained constant with about 5,000 inhabitants. As of 2025, Zikhron Ya'akov had a population of 23,875. Many residents continue to engage in agriculture, although upscale private homes have been built by families attracted to the scenic landscape. Zikhron Ya'akov has a high number of English speaking residents, olim and others.

== Education and religious institutions ==
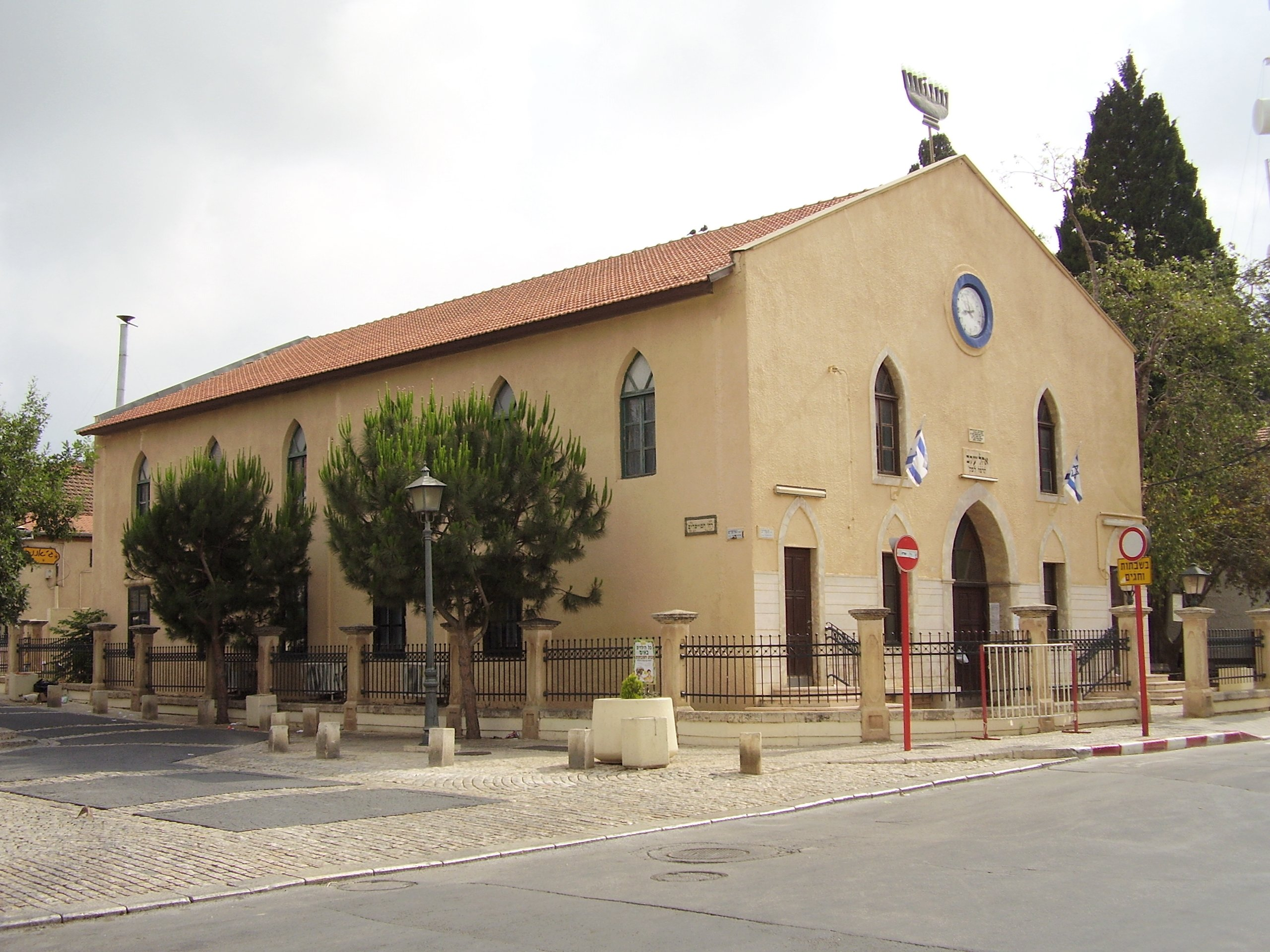
Ohel Ya'akov Synagogue

While the majority of citizens of the town would define themselves as secular, there is a sizable religious Jewish community in the town, including Haredi members of the Ohr Yaakov Yeshiva and members of a Chabad-Lubavitch community. In addition there are several religious zionist synagogues. It is unique in that there are Progressive/Reform and Conservative Jewish communities and synagogues in Zikhron Ya'akov. The former, "Kehillat Sulam Yaakov" (in Hebrew "Jacob's Ladder Community") is a synagogue that practices Progressive Judaism and is a part of the Israeli Movement for Progressive Judaism.

"VeAhavta" is a Conservative Jewish community and synagogue in Zikhron Ya'akov. It emphasizes an inclusive and egalitarian approach to Jewish practice, blending tradition with modern values. The community offers various religious and educational activities, including spiritual services, life-cycle events, and cultural programs.

"Kolot" is an Orthodox partnership minyan that meets regularly in Zikhron Ya'akov.

== Landmarks ==
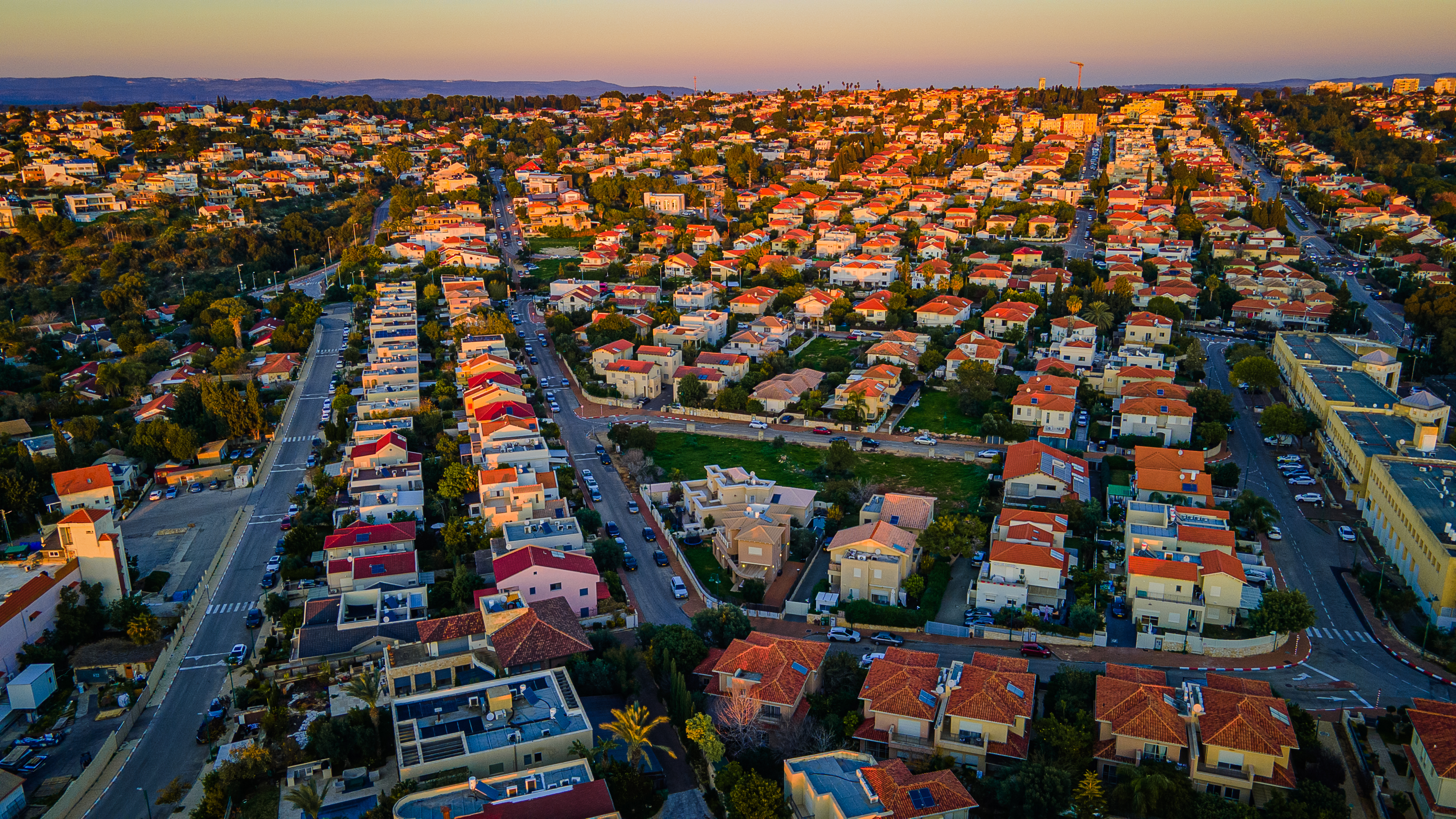
Neighborhood in Zikhron Ya'akov

The original Carmel-Mizrahi Winery continues to make wine in Zikhron Ya'akov. The town draws many tourists attracted to its picturesque setting and historic city center whose restored main street of landmark buildings, called Derekh HaYayin ("Path of the Wine"), houses coffeehouses and boutique shops selling locally made crafts, jewellery, and antiques, especially on the town's famous "Midrachov" (Rechov haMeyasdim — Founders Street). It was announced in early 2008 that a 150-acre (0.61 km^{2}) wine park would be created on the slope between Zikhron and neighboring town Binyamina.

== Transit ==
Zichron Yaakov was serviced by the Costal Railway until the late 1990s, at which point the Zikhron Ya'aqov railway station was closed.

The town is the terminus for several bus lines, including the Nateev Express Route 978 to Ramat Gan, Egged 90 to Pared Hanna-Karkur, Kavim Routes 84 to Hadera, 263 to Caesarea, 583 and 683 to Modiin Ilit, 701 to Binyamina, and 708 and 710 to Netanya.

== Voting Patterns ==
In the 2022 election, 62 percent of voters in Zikhron Ya'akov voted for the parties of the center-left coalition led by Yair Lapid, while 34 percent voted for the parties of the right-wing coalition led by Benjamin Netanyahu and 0.5 percent voted for the Arab parties.

In the 2026 election, 64 percent of voters in Zikhron Ya'akov voted for the parties of the center-left coalition led by Gadi Eisenkot, while 31 percent voted for the parties of the right-wing coalition led by Benjamin Netanyahu and 0.5 percent voted for the Arab parties. An additional 3.1 percent voted for the Reservists, and 1.8 percent voted for Amcha Yisrael. Voter turnout increased 18 percent from the 2022 election.

== Notable residents ==
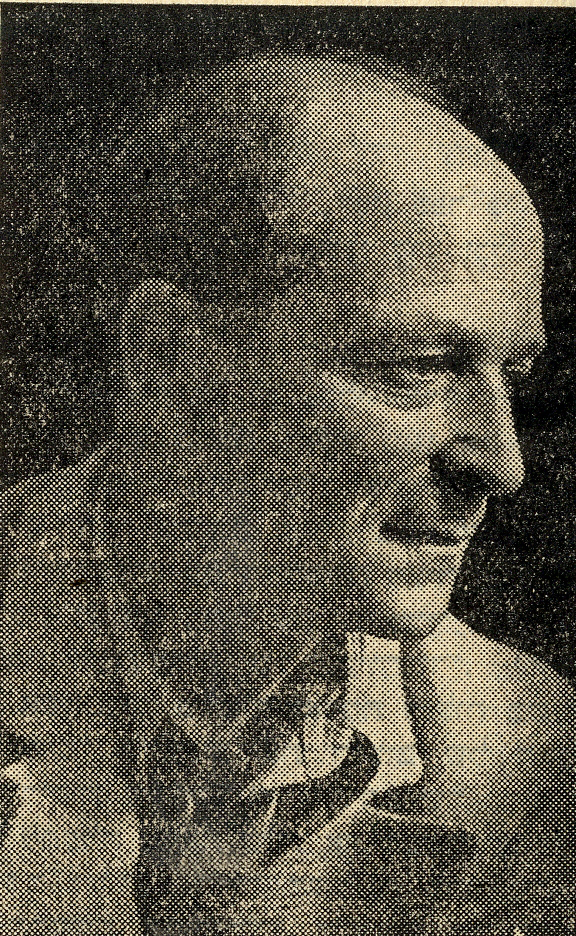
Joseph Zaritsky

- Aaron Aaronsohn (1876–1919), agronomist, botanist, and political activist
- Sarah Aaronsohn (1890–1917), member of Nili
- Aaron Ben-Ze'ev (born 1949), philosopher
- Rivka Carmi (born 1948), pediatrician, geneticist, and President of Ben-Gurion University of the Negev
- Tony Cliff (1917–2000), Trotskyist activist
- Reuven Gal (born 1942), social and clinical psychologist, social activist, and entrepreneur
- Moshe Ivgy (born 1953), actor and director
- Chaim Dov Kantor (1865–1944), rabbi
- Peretz Lavie (born 1949), expert on sleep disorders
- Motti Lerner (born 1949), playwright and screenwriter
- Shlomo Maital (born 1942), scientist
- Avi Mizrahi (born 1957), general
- Yair Naveh (born 1957), major general
- David Remez (1886–1951), politician, Minister of Transportation, and signatory of the Israeli declaration of independence
- Ran Sagiv (born 1997), Olympic triathlete
- Shachar Sagiv (born 1994), Olympic triathlete
- Shemi Sagiv (born 1959), Olympic marathoner
- Ofir Shaham (born 2004), Israeli team world champion rhythmic gymnast
- Dan Shilon (born 1940), television host, director, and producer
- Joseph Zaritsky (1891–1985), painter
- Hillel Halkin (born 1939), biographer, literary critic, and novelist

== Twin towns – sister cities ==
Zikhron Ya'akov is twinned with:

- Charenton-le-Pont, France
- South Palm Beach, United States

== See also ==
- Israeli wine

== Bibliography ==
- Barron, J. B., ed. (1923). Palestine: Report and General Abstracts of the Census of 1922. Government of Palestine.
