= Norman Bentwich =

British barrister and legal academic (1883–1971)

Norman Bentwich OBE MC
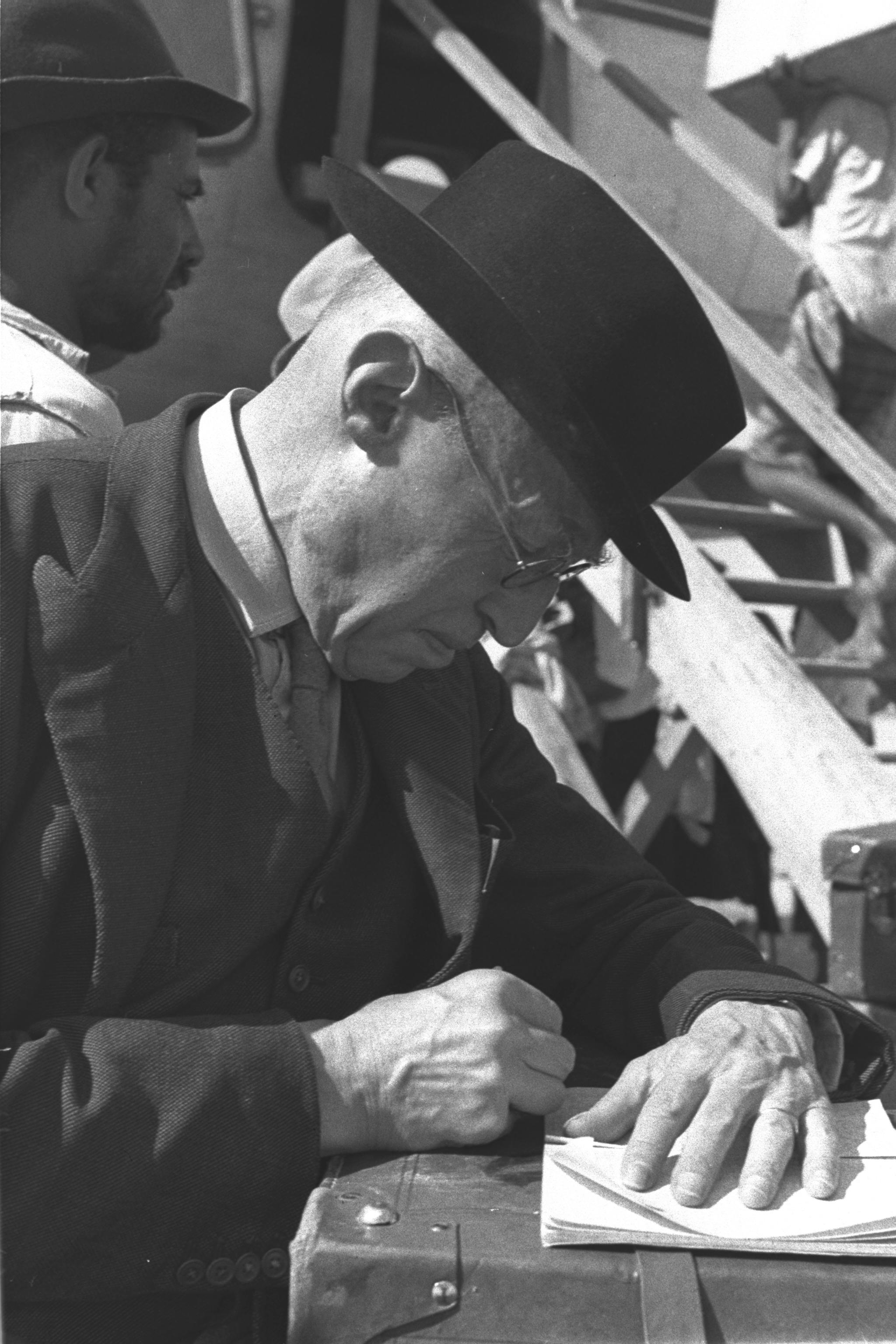
- Bentwich in 1950
- Born: Norman de Mattos Bentwich; 28 February 1883; Hampstead, London, England
- Died: 8 April 1971 (aged 88); Paddington, London, England
- Burial place: Mount Scopus, Jerusalem, Israel
- Education: St Paul's School; Trinity College, Cambridge
- Occupation: Barrister
- Known for: Attorney-general of Mandatory Palestine
- Spouse: Helen Franklin (m. 1915)
- Father: Herbert Bentwich
- Relatives: Joseph Bentwich (brother); Ari Shavit (great-nephew)

Norman de Mattos Bentwich (28 February 1883 – 8 April 1971) was a British barrister and legal academic. He was the British-appointed attorney-general of Mandatory Palestine and a lifelong Zionist.

== Biography ==
=== Early life ===
Norman Bentwich was the oldest son of British Zionist Herbert Bentwich. He attended St Paul's School in London and Trinity College, Cambridge, where he was said to be the "favourite pupil" of John Westlake.

Bentwich was a delegate at the annual Zionist Congresses from 1907 to 1912. He paid his first visit to Palestine in 1908.

He was commissioned in the Egyptian Camel Transport Corps on 1 January 1916. He was awarded the Military Cross and, in 1919, received the OBE.

=== Mandatory Palestine administration ===
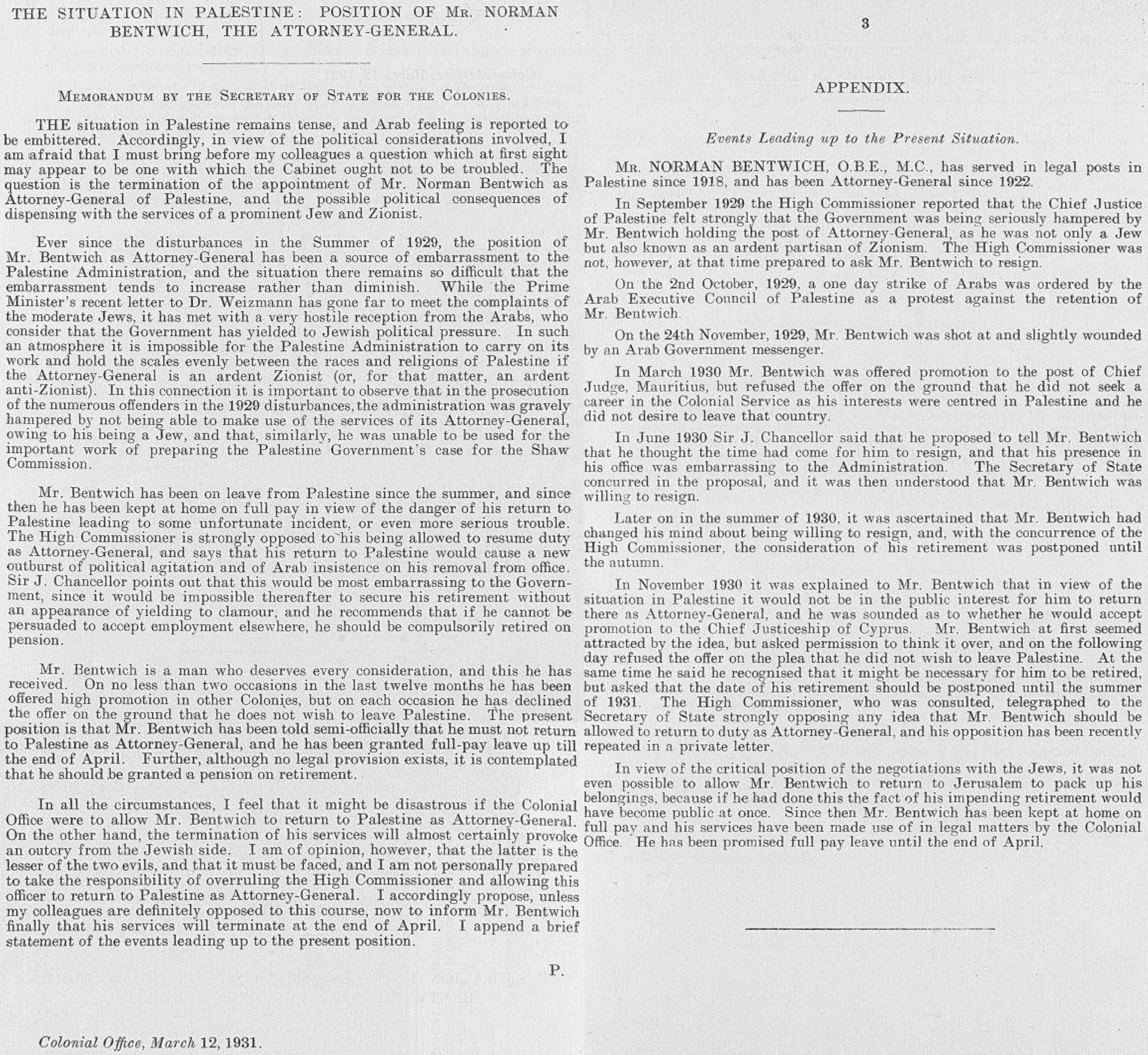
1931 Colonial Office memorandum regarding Norman Bentwich

During the British military administration of Palestine, Bentwich served as senior judicial officer, which continued in the civil administration after 1920 as legal secretary. The title was soon changed to attorney-general, a post he held until 1931.

Bentwich played a major role in the development of Palestinian law. According to Likhovski, he "concentrated his efforts on providing Palestine with a set of modern commercial laws that he believed would facilitate economic development and thus attract more Jewish immigration." Bentwich's Zionist leanings sparked the anger of Palestinians. Some British officials, including the Colonial Office and the Chief Justice of Palestine Michael McDonnell, saw him as a liability and pushed for his dismissal. In 1929 he was barred from representing the government at the Shaw Commission investigating the 1929 Palestine riots. In late 1930 he left England after failing to gain support for his continued role in Palestine. He was offered senior judicial positions in Mauritius and Cyprus, but turned them down. In August 1931 his appointment as attorney-general was terminated by the Under-Secretary of State for the Colonies, who cited "the peculiar racial and political conditions of Palestine, and the difficulties with which the Administration has in consequence to bear."

In November 1929, Bentwich was shot in the thigh by a 17-year-old Palestinian employee of the Palestine Police. His assailant was sentenced to 15 years' hard labour, despite Bentwich personally advocating for him.

=== Hebrew University ===
From 1932 to 1951 Bentwich served as the Chair of International Relations at the Hebrew University of Jerusalem. His first lecture, on "Jerusalem, City of Peace", was disrupted by Jewish students who considered him too conciliatory towards the Arabs. Several of the ringleaders, one of them Avraham Stern, were suspended. Bentwich was a disciple of Zionist thinker Ahad Ha'am, and wrote a book, Ahad Ha'am and His Philosophy, in 1927. He was one of the Jewish members of Palestine Administration who in 1929 joined Brit Shalom, a society founded to find rapprochement between Jews and Arabs in Palestine.

=== Later ===
He was later president of the Jewish Historical Society of England.

==== Kindertransport ====
In November 1938, the Government of the United Kingdom decided to let Jewish children under the age of 17 from Nazi countries enter the United Kingdom for a temporary stay. Various organisations started working together in the Refugee Children's Movement (RCM) to take care of these children. Bentwich took part and was sent to Holland to set up help for Jewish refugee children.

On 2 December, Dutch humanitarian Geertruida Wijsmuller-Meijer received a request to come to the newly established Dutch Children's Committee in Amsterdam. During this visit, she met Bentwich who asked her to travel to Vienna to meet a certain Dr. Eichner, which they believed was the name of the then largely unknown Adolf Eichmann. This man ran the Nazi agency for Jewish emigration. Wijsmuller left for Vienna the same day. She managed to get Eichmann to agree to letting the first group, containing 600 Viennese Jewish children, travel to Holland, on 10 December. The journeys through Holland were kept up on a weekly basis mostly through the ferry at Hook of Holland and some 10,000 Jewish children were saved in the Kindertransport until September 1939, when borders closed with the outbreak of the Second World War. The last 66 Jewish children came over from Amsterdam on 14 May 1940 through the port of IJmuiden, on the last ship the Nazis allowed out of Holland, the SS Bodegraven. (The Netherlands were invaded by the Nazis on 10 May 1940.)

In his book, Mandate Memories, Bentwich stated that "the Balfour Declaration was not an impetuous or sentimental act of the British government, as has been sometimes represented, or a calculated measure of political warfare. It was a deliberate decision of British policy and idealist politics, weighed and reweighed, and adopted only after full consultation with the United States and with other Allied Nations."

During the Second World War, Bentwich was commissioned into the Royal Air Force and on 24 February 1942 was promoted to flight lieutenant. On 16 December 1942, as Pilot Officer N. De M. Bentwich OBE MC (RAF/115215), he was cashiered by sentence of a General Court Martial, but this was not reported in the London Gazette until 23 February 1943. The unusual circumstances of this are explained in Bentwich’s book Wanderer in War, 1939-45 (1946). By misfortune, he had dropped an important secret document in the street, and his superiors decided to make an example of him as a warning to others. However, he was then able to join the Ministry of Information, working for Sir Wyndham Deedes, Regional Officer for Greater London. This work took him to the large East End bomb shelters, where steps were taken to transform them into community centres. He also travelled to Ethiopia, on a legal assignment for the Emperor.

Bentwich lived the last twenty years of his life in London, where his wife, Helen Bentwich, had a political career as a member of London County Council. Among his other roles, he served as president of the North Western Reform Synagogue in Alyth Gardens, Temple Fortune, from 1958 until his death.

== Academic and legal career ==
- Called to the bar (Lincoln's Inn), 1908
- Ministry of Justice, Cairo, 1912–1915
- Major, Camel Transport, 1916–1918
- Legal secretary to military administration, Palestine, 1918–22
- First attorney-general in mandatory government of Palestine, 1922–30
- Recalled to Colonial Office, 1930–31
- Professor of International Relations, Hebrew University of Jerusalem, 1932 and 1945–1951
- Director of League of Nations High Commission for Refugees from Germany, 1933–1935
- British Ministry of Information and Air Ministry, 1939–45
- Co-editor of the Jewish Review, 1910–1913 and 1932–1934
- Lecturer at Hague Academy of International Law, 1929, 1934 and 1955
- Vice-president, Jewish Committee for Relief Abroad
- Chairman, National Peace Council, 1944–1946
- Chairman, United Restitution Organization, 1948–1971
- Foreign Office Committee on Restitution in British Zone of Germany, 1951
- President, Jewish Historical Society, 1960–1962
- Chairman, Friends of Hebrew University
- President of North Western Reform Synagogue, Alyth Gardens, London 1958–71

== Published works ==
- Philo-Judaeus of Alexandria, Jewish Publication Society of America, Philadelphia, 1910.
- The Declaration of London, with an introduction and notes and appendices, E. Wilson, London, 1911.
- Students leading cases and statutes on international law, Sweet & Maxwell, London, 1913.
- Josephus, Jewish Publication Society of America, Philadelphia, 1914.
- Palestine of the Jews: past, present and future, London, 1919.
- Hellenism, The Jewish publication society of America, Philadelphia, 1919.
- Ahad Ha'am and his philosophy, Keren Hayesod (Palestine Foundation Fund) and the Keren Kayemeth Le-Israel, Jerusalem, 1927.
- The Mandates System, Longmans, London, 1930.
- England in Palestine, Kegan Paul, Trench, Trubner & Co. Ltd., London, 1932.
- A Wanderer in the Promised Land, The Soncino Press, 1932
- Palestine, Benn, London, 1934.
- Fulfilment in the Promised land, 1917–1937, Soncino Press, London, 1938.
- Solomon Schechter: A Biography, Jewish Publication Society of America, Philadelphia, 1938
- Wanderer Between Two Worlds – An Autobiography, Kegan Paul Trench Trubner, London, 1941.
- Judaea lives again, V. Gollancz, London, 1943.
- A Wanderer in War, V. Gollancz, London, 1946
- Israel, Ernest Bend, 1952.
- For Zion's Sake. A Biography of Judah L. Magnes. First Chancellor and First President of the Hebrew University of Jerusalem, Jewish Publication Society, 1954.
- Israel And Her Neighbours: A Short Historical Geography, Rider And Company, London, 1955.
- The Jews in our Times, Penguin Books, Harmondsworth, 1960.
- Israel Resurgent, Ernest Benn, London, 1960.
- My 77 years : an account of my life and times, 1883–1960, Jewish Publication Society of America, Philadelphia, 1961.
- Mandate Memories (with Helen Bentwich), The Hogarth Press, London, 1965.
- Israel : two fateful years, 1967–69, Elec, London, 1970.
- Jewish Youth Comes Home: The Story of the Youth Aliyah, 1933-1943, Hyperion Press, 1976.
